= List of National Women's Soccer League transactions 2023 =

List of women's soccer league transactions

The 2023 National Women's Soccer League (NWSL) off-season began on October 30, 2022, and the 2023 season competition calendar — which includes its preseason, regular season, and postseason — runs from January 4 to November 11, 2023. This list includes transactions featuring at least one club from the National Women's Soccer League that were completed during the 2023 off-season and competition calendar, and loans from the previous season due to expire during the same period.

== Transaction rules ==
The NWSL operates with caps on the number of players that a club can sign; a salary cap the club's total wage bill, extendible by allocation money; minimum and maximum individual player salary caps, which can be surpassed using allocation money; a club's total allocation money; the number of international players (defined as players not eligible to work in the United States without a visa) that a club can sign; and the number of players under the age of 18 that a club can sign.

The 2023 season marked the first time that players with at least six years' tenure in the NWSL and expiring contracts became free agents capable of negotiating contracts with any NWSL team. Following a labor dispute over whether 22 players with unexercised contract options counted as expired contracts in which an arbitrator ruled in favor of the NWSL Players Association, a total of 48 players were designated as the league's first free agents retroactive to August 26, 2023. All other players are subject to the NWSL's systems of distributing players' rights, which assigns the right for clubs to offer or hold a league-centralized standard player agreement (SPA) to a player. These systems include:

- Drafts, mechanisms in which player rights are distributed in a league-determined order, such as the annual NWSL Draft, expansion and dispersal drafts, and the Re-entry Wire for waived players
- Trades, in which teams exchange player contracts, players' rights, or non-player assets such as selection order in NWSL drafts, immunity from selection in expansion drafts, allocation money, and international roster spots allowing the signing of players not eligible to work in the United States through a green card or citizenship
- Discovery, in which a league-assigned order prioritizes teams' claims to the rights of players not already under contract with the NWSL, including players who registered for the NWSL Draft but were not selected, international players, and waived players who clear the Re-entry Wire
- Free agency, limited to out-of-contract players with a certain tenure of play in the NWSL
- Under-18 entry list, limited to players under the age of 18 with additional restrictions, such as minimum contract lengths and limitations on trades, transfers, and loans

Player rights limit only which club within the NWSL that can sign a player to a SPA. Clubs can possess and retain the right to sign a player who is not under contract with the team, and such players have no obligation to report to the team and are not prevented from signing contracts with other leagues. Clubs can also sign players on loan dependent on their league's regulations. SPAs can contain a no-trade clause, and can include either a unilateral or mutual contract option to extend its terms by an additional year.

Clubs can sign players to short-term Injury Replacement Player (IRP) contract should a rostered player be injured, Season-Ending Injury/Illness Replacement (SEI) contracts, short-term National Team Replacement Player (NTRP) contracts to replace rostered players called up to international duty during the season, and short-term Goalkeeper Replacement (GKR) contracts should a team become unable to field two goalkeepers during the season. Such contracts are not subject to league caps and roster freeze dates for the duration of the replaced player's absence, and NTRP contracts must be terminated within three days of the end of the associated international window. Players taking parental leave, using pregnancy benefits, or taking player-elected or mental health leave are also exempt from roster caps.

=== Transactions calendar ===
Transaction dates and deadlines
Date	Function
October 31, 2022	Trade window opens
November 11, 2022	Trade window closes
November 15, 2022	Terms of new contracts, list of waived players, and list of exercised contract options due
November 16, 2022	End-of-season Re-entry Wire opens
November 17, 2022	End-of-season Re-entry Wire closes
November 18, 2022	Trade window opens
December 22, 2022	Trade window closes, transaction moratorium begins
January 4, 2023	Transaction moratorium ends, trade window opens
January 4, 2023	Transaction moratorium ends, trade window opens
January 12, 2023	2023 NWSL Draft
February 3, 2023	Primary transfer window opens
January 23, 2023	Pre-season begins
March 20, 2023	Roster compliance deadline, 22–26-player final roster due
March 25, 2023	Regular season begins
April 27, 2023	Primary transfer window, trade window close
June 28, 2023	Secondary transfer window, trade window opens
July 25, 2023	Secondary transfer window, trade window close
July 25, 2023	Secondary transfer window, trade window close
September 19, 2023	Last day to waive players
September 20, 2023	Re-entry Wire opens
September 21, 2023	Re-entry Wire closes; deadline to exercise contract options on upcoming free agents
September 22, 2023	Roster freeze date; free agent negotiations begin
October 15, 2023	Regular season ends
November 11, 2023	NWSL Playoffs end

== Transactions ==
=== 2023 NWSL Draft ===
2023 NWSL Draft selections and contract signings (Note: The 2023 NWSL Draft was held on January 12, 2023, in Philadelphia, Pennsylvania. Draft picks are not automatically offered or signed to standard player agreements (SPA). Players who registered for an NWSL Draft but were not selected become eligible for discovery the day after the draft. If a team drafts a player and offers them a SPA that the player doesn't accept, the team retains the player's NWSL rights through the earliest date of either January 30, 2026, or the completed term, including option years, of the offer.)
R	P	Drafting team	Pos.	Nat.	Name	Previous team	Contract status	Signing date	Ref.
1	1	Angel City FC	FW	(United States) USA	Alyssa Thompson	Harvard-Westlake Wolverines	Signed to a three-year contract.	January 30, 2023	
1	2	Kansas City Current	FW	(United States) USA	Michelle Cooper	Duke Blue Devils	Signed to a three-year contract.	February 2, 2023	
1	3	Orlando Pride	DF	(United States) USA	Emily Madril	Florida State Seminoles	Signed by the NWSL through 2025 prior to being drafted. (Note: Emily Madril was eligible for the NWSL Draft but chose to become a professional player before draft registration. Since NWSL standard player agreements (SPA) are signed with the league instead of clubs as a single-entity organization, the league offered Madril a contract without assigning her player rights to an NWSL club, loaned her to BK Häcken, and registered her for distribution in the 2023 NWSL Draft. Orlando Pride selected her in the draft and accepted her league-signed contract.)	August 30, 2022	
1	4	NJ/NY Gotham FC	MF	(United States) USA	Jenna Nighswonger	Florida State Seminoles	Signed to a three-yeaer contract.	January 13, 2023	
1	5	Portland Thorns FC	DF	(Mexico) MEX	Reyna Reyes	Alabama Crimson Tide	Signed through 2024 with an option for 2025.	March 25, 2023	
1	6	North Carolina Courage	FW	(United States) USA	Olivia Wingate	Notre Dame Fighting Irish	Signed through 2025.	March 13, 2023	
1	7	Chicago Red Stars	FW	(United States) USA	Penelope Hocking	Penn State Nittany Lions	Signed to a three-year contract with an option for a fourth year.	March 20, 2023	
1	8	North Carolina Courage	MF	(Canada) CAN	Sydney Collins	California Golden Bears	Signed through 2025.	March 13, 2023	
1	9	North Carolina Courage	MF	(United States) USA	Clara Robbins	Florida State Seminoles	Signed through 2025.	March 13, 2023	
1	10	Kansas City Current	FW	(United States) USA	Alexa Spaanstra	Virginia Cavaliers	Signed to a two-year contract.	February 22, 2023	
1	11	North Carolina Courage	FW	(United States) USA	Haley Hopkins	Virginia Cavaliers	Signed through 2025.	March 13, 2023	
1	12	Portland Thorns FC	FW	(United States) USA	Izzy D'Aquila	Santa Clara Broncos	Signed through 2025 with an option for 2026.	March 15, 2023	
2	13	San Diego Wave FC	MF	(United States) USA	Sierra Enge	Stanford Cardinal	Signed to a one-year contract with a mutual option for an additional year.	March 6, 2023	
2	14	Chicago Red Stars	MF	(United States) USA	Grace Yochum	Oklahoma State Cowgirls	Declined to report to preseason training.	—	
2	15	Kansas City Current	DF	(United States) USA	Gabrielle Robinson	West Virginia Mountaineers	Signed to a one-year contract with a one-year option.	March 20, 2023	
2	16	Racing Louisville FC	FW	(United States) USA	Kayla Fischer	Ohio State Buckeyes	Signed to a two-year contract.	March 17, 2023	
2	17	Racing Louisville FC	DF	(United States) USA	Brianna Martinez	Notre Dame Fighting Irish	Not signed, rights waived.	—	
2	18	Kansas City Current	GK	(United States) USA	Jordan Silkowitz	Iowa State Cyclones	Signed to a two-year contract.	March 20, 2023	
2	19	OL Reign	DF	(United States) USA	Shae Holmes	Washington Huskies	Signed to a one-year contract with an option for an additional year.	March 25, 2023	
2	20	Houston Dash	MF	(United States) USA	Sophie Hirst	Harvard Crimson	Signed to a one-year contract with an option for an additional year.	March 25, 2023	
2	21	Orlando Pride	FW	(United States) USA	Messiah Bright	TCU Horned Frogs	Signed to a three-year contract.	March 1, 2023	
2	22	Houston Dash	DF	(United States) USA	Jyllissa Harris	South Carolina Gamecocks	Signed to a one-year contract with an option for an additional year.	March 25, 2023	
2	23	Chicago Red Stars	FW	(United States) USA	Ally Schlegel	Penn State Nittany Lions	Signed to a three-year contract with an option for a fourth year.	March 20, 2023	
2	24	Portland Thorns FC	FW	(United States) USA	Lauren DeBeau	Michigan State Spartans	Not signed, rights released.	—	
3	25	Orlando Pride	DF	(United States) USA	Tori Hansen	North Carolina Tar Heels	Signed to a one-year contract with an option for an additional year.	March 29, 2023	
3	26	Washington Spirit	FW	(England) ENG	Nicole Douglas	Arizona State Sun Devils	Signed to a two-year contract and rostered as a midfielder.	March 8, 2023	
3	27	Angel City FC	GK	(United States) USA	Angelina Anderson	California Golden Bears	Signed to a one-year contract.	January 26, 2023	
3	28	Washington Spirit	GK	(United States) USA	Lyza Bosselmann	Gonzaga Bulldogs	Signed to a two-year contract with an option for a third year.	March 8, 2023	
3	29	Racing Louisville FC	MF	(United States) USA	Jadyn Edwards	New Mexico Lobos	Not signed, rights waived.	—	
3	30	Washington Spirit	FW	(Panama) PAN	Riley Tanner	Alabama Crimson Tide	Signed to a two-year contract with an option for a third year and rostered as a midfielder.	March 8, 2023	
3	31	Racing Louisville FC	FW	(United States) USA	Riley Parker	Alabama Crimson Tide	Signed to a one-year contract with an option for an additional year.	February 1, 2023	
3	32	Portland Thorns FC	GK	(United States) USA	Lauren Kozal	Michigan State Spartans	Signed to a one-year contract with an option for an additional year.	March 15, 2023	
3	33	San Diego Wave FC	GK	(United States) USA	Lauren Brzykcy	UCLA Bruins	Signed to a two-year contract.	March 14, 2023	
3	34	Washington Spirit	FW	(United States) USA	Lena Silano	Long Beach State Beach	Signed to a two-year contract with an option for a third year.	March 8, 2023	
3	35	Kansas City Current	DF	(United States) USA	Mykiaa Minniss	Washington State Cougars	Not signed; rights waived.	—	
3	36	Houston Dash	DF	(United States) USA	Lindsi Jennings	LSU Tigers	Signed to a short-term Injury Replacement Player contract.	April 7, 2023	
4	37	Washington Spirit	FW	(United States) USA	Civana Kuhlmann	Colorado Buffaloes	Signed to a two-year contract with an option for a third year.	March 8, 2023	
4	38	Kansas City Current	DF	(United States) USA	Ella Shamburger	Vanderbilt Commodores	Opted to finish college. Signed a National Team Replacement contract on July 20, 2023, with Racing Louisville FC.	—	
4	39	Orlando Pride	MF	(United States) USA	Summer Yates	Washington Huskies	Signed to a two-year contract with an option for an additional year.	March 7, 2023	
4	40	Washington Spirit	DF	(United States) USA	Delaney Graham	Duke Blue Devils	Not signed; recovering from surgery.	—	
4	41	Orlando Pride	FW	(United States) USA	Kristen Scott	UCF Knights	Not signed. Signed a one-year contract with AS Saint-Étienne on July 21, 2023.	—	
4	42	Kansas City Current	MF	(United States) USA	Rylan Childers	Kansas Jayhawks	Signed to a one-year contract.	March 20, 2023	
4	43	Chicago Red Stars	MF	(United States) USA	Sophie Jones	Duke Blue Devils	Signed to a two-year contract.	March 20, 2023	
4	44	NJ/NY Gotham FC	MF	(United States) USA	Iliana Hocking	Arizona Wildcats	Not signed.	—	
4	45	San Diego Wave FC	MF	(United States) USA	Giovanna DeMarco	Wake Forest Demon Deacons	Signed to a one-year contract with an option for an additional year.	March 22, 2023	
4	46	OL Reign	MF	(United States) USA	Natalie Viggiano	Wisconsin Badgers	Signed to a short-term National Team Replacement Player contract.	June 26, 2023	
4	47	Kansas City Current	GK	(United States) USA	Ashley Orkus	Ole Miss Rebels	Not signed; rights waived.	—	
4	48	Houston Dash	DF	(United States) USA	Madelyn Desiano	UCLA Bruins	Signed to a one-year contract with an option for an additional year.	March 25, 2023	

=== Players and assets ===
As of July 9, 2023

2022–23 NWSL player and asset transactions
Date	T	Origin club	Pos.	Nat.	Player name or asset(s)	Destination club	End	Notes	Ref.
January 27, 2022	LOU	Portland Thorns FC	MF	(United States) USA	Lindsey Horan	(France) Olympique Lyon	2023	Loaned through June 30, 2023.	
August 30, 2022	CSI	—	DF	(United States) USA	Emily Madril	National Women's Soccer League	2025	Signed to a centralized contract with the league prior to her rights being assigned to a club in the 2023 NWSL Draft.	
August 30, 2022	LOU	National Women's Soccer League	DF	(United States) USA	Emily Madril	(Sweden) BK Häcken FF	2022	Loaned out for the duration of the 2022 Damallsvenskan.	
September 19, 2022	LOU	Angel City FC	DF	(Canada) CAN	Vanessa Gilles	(France) Olympique Lyon	2023	Loaned through June 2023 for the 2022–23 Division 1 Féminine season.	
September 27, 2022	LOU	Racing Louisville FC	GK	(United States) USA	Hillary Beall	(Australia) Western United FC	2023	Loaned through 2022–23 A-League Women season ending in April.	
September 30, 2022	CRE	Portland Thorns FC	DF	(United States) USA	Becky Sauerbrunn	—	2023	Free agent re-signed through 2023.	
October 14, 2022	CEX	NJ/NY Gotham FC	FW	(Japan) JPN	Kumi Yokoyama	—	2022	Contract expired.	
October 14, 2022	CEX	NJ/NY Gotham FC	FW	(United States) USA	Jenna Bike	—	2022	Contract expired.	
October 14, 2022	CEX	NJ/NY Gotham FC	MF	(Ghana) GHA	Jennifer Cudjoe	—	2022	Contract expired.	
October 14, 2022	COP	NJ/NY Gotham FC	FW	(United States) USA	Domi Richardson	—	2022	Contract option not exercised.	
October 14, 2022	RET	NJ/NY Gotham FC	MF	(United States) USA	Nicole Baxter	—	2022	Retired.	
October 16, 2022	LOU	Racing Louisville FC	GK	(United States) USA	Jordyn Bloomer	(Australia) Western Sydney Wanderers FC	2023	Loaned through 2022–23 A-League Women season ending in February.	
October 18, 2022	LOU	Racing Louisville FC	FW	(United States) USA	Jessica McDonald	(Australia) Western United FC	2023	Loaned through 2022–23 A-League Women season ending in February.	
October 20, 2022	CRE	Houston Dash	DF	(Canada) CAN	Allysha Chapman	—	2023	Free agent re-signed to a one-year contract with an option for an additional year.	
October 20, 2022	CRE	Houston Dash	MF	(Canada) CAN	Sophie Schmidt	—	2024	Free agent re-signed to a two-year contract with an option for an additional year.	
October 20, 2022	LOU	Racing Louisville FC	MF	(Australia) AUS	Alex Chidiac	(Australia) Melbourne City FC	2023	Loaned through 2022–23 A-League Women season ending in February.	
October 28, 2022	CRE	OL Reign	MF	(Canada) CAN	Quinn	—	2024	Re-signed to a two-year contract.	
October 31, 2022	LOU	Chicago Red Stars	FW	(Australia) AUS	Chelsie Dawber	(Australia) Adelaide United FC	2023	Loaned until May 4, 2023.	
October 31, 2022	LOU	Chicago Red Stars	FW	(United States) USA	Sarah Griffith	(Australia) Newcastle Jets FC	2023	Loaned until April 6, 2023.	
November 1, 2022	COP	Portland Thorns FC	FW	(Canada) CAN	Christine Sinclair	—	2023	Contract option exercised.	
November 7, 2022	LOU	Racing Louisville FC	FW	(United States) USA	Emina Ekic	(Australia) Melbourne City FC	2023	Loaned through 2022–23 A-League Women season ending in February.	
November 8, 2022	CRE	OL Reign	DF	(United States) USA	Sam Hiatt	—	2024	Re-signed to a two-year contract.	
November 8, 2022	CRE	Portland Thorns FC	MF	(Costa Rica) CRC	Raquel Rodríguez	—	2025	Re-signed through 2025.	
November 10, 2022	CXT	Portland Thorns FC	MF	(United States) USA	Sam Coffey	—	2025	Signed to a contract extension through 2025.	
November 11, 2022	CRE	Chicago Red Stars	FW	(Japan) JPN	Yūki Nagasato	—	2023	Re-signed to a one-year contract with an option for an additional year.	
November 15, 2022	CEX	Angel City FC	FW	(England) ENG	Miri Taylor	—	2022	Contract expired.	
November 15, 2022	CEX	Angel City FC	GK	(Germany) GER	Almuth Schult	—	2022	Contract expired.	
November 15, 2022	CEX	Angel City FC	MF	(Brazil) BRA	Stefany Ferrer Van Ginkel	—	2022	Contract expired.	
November 15, 2022	CEX	Angel City FC	MF	(United States) USA	Hope Breslin	—	2022	Contract expired.	
November 15, 2022	CEX	Angel City FC	MF	(United States) USA	Katie Cousins	—	2022	Contract expired.	
November 15, 2022	CEX	Houston Dash	GK	(United States) USA	Lindsey Harris	—	2022	Contract expired.	
November 15, 2022	CEX	Houston Dash	MF	(Jamaica) JAM	Tiernny Wiltshire	—	2022	Contract expired.	
November 15, 2022	CEX	Houston Dash	MF	(United States) USA	Brianna Visalli	—	2022	Contract expired.	
November 15, 2022	CEX	Houston Dash	MF	(United States) USA	Cali Farquharson	—	2022	Contract expired; free agent.	
November 15, 2022	CEX	OL Reign	FW	(United States) USA	Tobin Heath	—	2022	Contract expired; unrestricted free agent.	
November 15, 2022	CEX	Orlando Pride	MF	(United States) USA	Parker Roberts	—	2022	Contract expired.	
November 15, 2022	CEX	Racing Louisville FC	DF	(United States) USA	Nealy Martin	—	2022	Contract expired.	
November 15, 2022	CEX	San Diego Wave FC	DF	(United States) USA	Taylor Hansen	—	2022	Contract expired.	
November 15, 2022	CEX	San Diego Wave FC	FW	(United States) USA	Jackie Altschuld	—	2022	Contract expired.	
November 15, 2022	CEX	San Diego Wave FC	GK	(United States) USA	Melissa Lowder	—	2022	Contract expired.	
November 15, 2022	CEX	San Diego Wave FC	MF	(United States) USA	Sydney Pulver	—	2022	Contract expired.	
November 15, 2022	CEX	Washington Spirit	DF	(Mexico) MEX	Karina Rodríguez	—	2022	Contract expired.	
November 15, 2022	CEX	Washington Spirit	DF	(United States) USA	Averie Collins	—	2022	Contract expired.	
November 15, 2022	CEX	Washington Spirit	FW	(United States) USA	Audrey Harding	—	2022	Contract expired.	
November 15, 2022	CEX	Washington Spirit	GK	(Canada) CAN	Devon Kerr	—	2022	Contract expired.	
November 15, 2022	COP	Houston Dash	FW	(France) FRA	Valérie Gauvin	—	2022	Contract option declined.	
November 15, 2022	COP	Kansas City Current	DF	(United States) USA	Addisyn Merrick	—	2023	Contract option exercised.	
November 15, 2022	COP	Kansas City Current	DF	(United States) USA	Izzy Rodriguez	—	2023	Contract option exercised.	
November 15, 2022	COP	Kansas City Current	DF	(United States) USA	Jenna Winebrenner	—	2023	Contract option exercised.	
November 15, 2022	COP	North Carolina Courage	DF	(United States) USA	Jaelene Daniels	—	2023	Contract option declined; unrestricted free agent.	
November 15, 2022	COP	North Carolina Courage	DF	(United States) USA	Kaleigh Kurtz	—	2023	Contract option exercised.	
November 15, 2022	COP	North Carolina Courage	FW	(Mexico) MEX	Diana Ordóñez	—	2023	Contract option exercised.	
November 15, 2022	COP	North Carolina Courage	GK	(United States) USA	Marisa Bova	—	2023	Contract option exercised.	
November 15, 2022	COP	North Carolina Courage	MF	(Japan) JPN	Fuka Nagano	—	2023	Contract option exercised.	
November 15, 2022	COP	North Carolina Courage	MF	(United States) USA	Emily Gray	—	2023	Contract option exercised.	
November 15, 2022	COP	North Carolina Courage	MF	(United States) USA	Frankie Tagliaferri	—	2023	Contract option exercised.	
November 15, 2022	COP	North Carolina Courage	MF	(United States) USA	Tess Boade	—	2023	Contract option exercised.	
November 15, 2022	COP	OL Reign	GK	(United States) USA	Claudia Dickey	—	2023	Contract option exercised.	
November 15, 2022	COP	OL Reign	GK	(United States) USA	Laurel Ivory	—	2023	Contract option exercised.	
November 15, 2022	COP	OL Reign	MF	(United States) USA	Olivia Athens	—	2023	Contract option exercised.	
November 15, 2022	COP	OL Reign	MF	(United States) USA	Olivia Van der Jagt	—	2023	Contract option exercised.	
November 15, 2022	COP	Portland Thorns FC	DF	(United States) USA	Natalie Beckman	—	2023	Contract option exercised.	
November 15, 2022	COP	Portland Thorns FC	FW	(United States) USA	Marissa Everett	—	2022	Contract option declined.	
November 15, 2022	COP	Portland Thorns FC	MF	(United States) USA	Gabby Provenzano	—	2023	Contract option exercised.	
November 15, 2022	COP	Portland Thorns FC	MF	(United States) USA	Taylor Porter	—	2023	Contract option exercised.	
November 15, 2022	COP	Racing Louisville FC	DF	(England) ENG	Gemma Bonner	—	2022	Contract option mutually declined.	
November 15, 2022	COP	Racing Louisville FC	FW	(United States) USA	Emina Ekic	—	2023	Contract option exercised.	
November 15, 2022	COP	Racing Louisville FC	FW	(United States) USA	Parker Goins	—	2023	Contract option exercised.	
November 15, 2022	COP	Racing Louisville FC	GK	(United States) USA	Hillary Beall	—	2023	Contract option exercised.	
November 15, 2022	COP	Racing Louisville FC	GK	(United States) USA	Jordyn Bloomer	—	2023	Contract option exercised.	
November 15, 2022	COP	Racing Louisville FC	MF	(Australia) AUS	Alex Chidiac	—	2023	Contract option exercised.	
November 15, 2022	COP	Racing Louisville FC	MF	(United States) USA	Taylor Malham	—	2023	Contract option exercised.	
November 15, 2022	COP	San Diego Wave FC	DF	(United States) USA	Kayla Bruster	—	2022	Contract option declined.	
November 15, 2022	COP	San Diego Wave FC	FW	(Germany) GER	Marleen Schimmer	—	2022	Contract option declined.	
November 15, 2022	COP	Washington Spirit	DF	(United States) USA	Alia Martin	—	2022	Contract option declined.	
November 15, 2022	COP	Washington Spirit	DF	(United States) USA	Sam Staab	—	2023	Contract option exercised.	
November 15, 2022	COP	Washington Spirit	FW	(United States) USA	Maddie Elwell	—	2023	Contract option exercised.	
November 15, 2022	COP	Washington Spirit	FW	(United States) USA	Tara McKeown	—	2023	Contract option exercised.	
November 15, 2022	COP	Washington Spirit	MF	(United States) USA	Anna Heilferty	—	2023	Contract option exercised.	
November 15, 2022	COP	Washington Spirit	MF	(United States) USA	Bayley Feist	—	2023	Contract option exercised.	
November 15, 2022	COP	Washington Spirit	MF	(United States) USA	Dorian Bailey	—	2023	Contract option exercised.	
November 15, 2022	COP	Washington Spirit	MF	(United States) USA	Jordan Baggett	—	2023	Contract option exercised.	
November 15, 2022	COP	Washington Spirit	MF	(United States) USA	Taylor Aylmer	—	2022	Contract option declined.	
November 15, 2022	CRE	Chicago Red Stars	DF	(United States) USA	Arin Wright	—	2024	Re-signed to a two-year contract.	
November 15, 2022	CRE	Houston Dash	MF	(United States) USA	Elizabeth Eddy	—	2023	Free agent re-signed to a one-year contract.	
November 15, 2022	CRE	Kansas City Current	FW	(United States) USA	Cece Kizer	—	2024	Re-signed to a two-year contract.	
November 15, 2022	CXT	Portland Thorns FC	FW	(United States) USA	Morgan Weaver	—	2024	Signed to a contract extension through 2024 with an option for 2025.	
November 15, 2022	LOU	North Carolina Courage	MF	(United States) USA	Tess Boade	(Australia) Western Sydney Wanderers	2023	Loaned until February 2023.	
November 15, 2022	OPT	Houston Dash	GK	(United States) USA	Ella Dederick	—	2023	Contract option exercised.	
November 15, 2022	OPT	Houston Dash	MF	(United States) USA	Marisa Viggiano	—	2023	Contract option exercised.	
November 15, 2022	REL	North Carolina Courage	DF	(New Zealand) NZL	Katie Bowen	—	2022	Contract mutually terminated.	
November 15, 2022	REL	North Carolina Courage	FW	(United States) USA	Rylee Baisden	—	2022	Contract mutually terminated.	
November 15, 2022	RET	Angel City FC	GK	(United States) USA	Maia Pérez	—	2022	Retired.	
November 15, 2022	TFI	(Argentina) UAI Urquiza	FW	(Argentina) ARG	Paulina Gramaglia	Houston Dash	2023	Exercised purchase option from loan.	
November 15, 2022	TFO	Orlando Pride	DF	(United States) USA	Toni Pressley	(Iceland) Breiðablik	????	Contract expired, new contract offer declined. Exited on free transfer.	
November 15, 2022	WAI	Kansas City Current	FW	(United States) USA	Jaycie Johnson	—	2022	Waived.	
November 15, 2022	WAI	Kansas City Current	GK	(United States) USA	Sydney Schneider	—	2022	Waived.	
November 15, 2022	WAI	OL Reign	DF	(United States) USA	Sinclaire Miramontez	—	2022	Waived.	
November 15, 2022	WAI	OL Reign	FW	(United States) USA	Jodi Ulkekul	—	2022	Waived.	
November 15, 2022	WAI	Orlando Pride	MF	(United States) USA	Chelsee Washington	—	2022	Waived.	
November 16, 2022	COP	Chicago Red Stars	DF	(Canada) CAN	Bianca St-Georges	—	2023	Contract option exercised.	
November 16, 2022	COP	Chicago Red Stars	DF	(United States) USA	Kayla Sharples	—	2023	Contract option exercised.	
November 16, 2022	COP	Chicago Red Stars	DF	(United States) USA	Tatumn Milazzo	—	2023	Contract option exercised.	
November 16, 2022	COP	Chicago Red Stars	FW	(United States) USA	Ella Stevens	—	2023	Contract option exercised.	
November 16, 2022	COP	Chicago Red Stars	GK	(United States) USA	Emily Boyd	—	2023	Contract option exercised.	
November 16, 2022	RET	NJ/NY Gotham FC	GK	(United States) USA	Ashlyn Harris	—	2022	Retired; joined Gotham FC's front office.	
November 16, 2022	WAI	Chicago Red Stars	DF	(United States) USA	Mikenna McManus	—	2022	Waived.	
November 16, 2022	WAI	Chicago Red Stars	MF	(United States) USA	Channing Foster	—	2022	Waived.	
November 28, 2022	CRE	North Carolina Courage	DF	(United States) USA	Kaleigh Kurtz	—	2025	Re-signed through 2025 on a guaranteed contract.	
November 28, 2022	FAS	Portland Thorns FC	GK	(United States) USA	Abby Smith	NJ/NY Gotham FC	2025	Signed as an unrestricted free agent through 2025.	
November 28, 2022	RET	Portland Thorns FC	FW	(United States) USA	Marissa Everett	—	2022	Retired.	
November 29, 2022	RET	Kansas City Current	DF	(United States) USA	Taylor Leach	—	2022	Retired.	
November 30, 2022	CRE	Washington Spirit	MF	(Republic of Ireland) IRL	Marissa Sheva	—	2023	Re-signed to a one-year contract.	
December 1, 2022	CRE	OL Reign	MF	(United States) USA	Marley Canales	—	2023	Re-signed to a one-year contract.	
December 1, 2022	FAS	Kansas City Current	DF	(United States) USA	Kristen Edmonds	NJ/NY Gotham FC	2024	Signed as a free agent through 2024.	
December 2, 2022	FAS	Chicago Red Stars	FW	(United States) USA	Rachel Hill	San Diego Wave FC	2024	Free agent signed to a two-year contract.	
December 2, 2022	FAS	NJ/NY Gotham FC	DF	(Cameroon) CMR	Estelle Johnson	North Carolina Courage	2024	Free agent signed to a two-year guaranteed contract.	
December 4, 2022	CRE	Angel City FC	DF	(United States) USA	Jasmyne Spencer	—	2024	Re-signed to a two-year contract with a third-year option.	
December 5, 2022	FAS	Chicago Red Stars	MF	(United States) USA	Danielle Colaprico	San Diego Wave FC	2024	Free agent signed to a two-year contract.	
December 6, 2022	CRE	North Carolina Courage	MF	(United States) USA	Meredith Speck	—	2024	Free agent re-signed through 2024 on a guaranteed contract.	
December 7, 2022	CRE	Angel City FC	DF	(United States) USA	Megan Reid	—	2023	Re-signed to a one-year contract.	
December 7, 2022	FAS	Chicago Red Stars	MF	(United States) USA	Morgan Gautrat	Kansas City Current	2024	Free agent signed to a two-year contract.	
December 7, 2022	FAS	Chicago Red Stars	MF	(United States) USA	Vanessa DiBernardo	Kansas City Current	2024	Free agent signed to a two-year contract.	
December 7, 2022	RET	Chicago Red Stars	MF	(United States) USA	Sarah Woldmoe	—	2022	Retired.	
December 8, 2022	CRE	Houston Dash	FW	(Nigeria) NGR	Michelle Alozie	—	2024	Re-signed to a two-year contract.	
December 8, 2022	CRE	Washington Spirit	MF	(United States) USA	Tori Huster	—	2023	Re-signed to a one-year contract.	
December 8, 2022	WIR	Racing Louisville FC	DF	(United States) USA	Nealy Martin	NJ/NY Gotham FC	2023	Signed from the Re-entry Wire to a one-year contract with an option for an additional year.	
December 9, 2022	TFI	(Sweden) KIF Örebro DFF	DF	(Finland) FIN	Elli Pikkujämsä	Racing Louisville FC	2024	Free transfer signed to a two-year contract with a mutual option for an additional year.	
December 12, 2022	CRE	Washington Spirit	DF	(Canada) CAN	Gabrielle Carle	—	2024	Re-signed to a two-year contract with an option for a third year.	
December 13, 2022	CRE	Houston Dash	FW	(United States) USA	Natalie Jacobs	—	2024	Re-signed to a two-year contract.	
December 13, 2022	CRE	Washington Spirit	DF	(United States) USA	Camryn Biegalski	—	2023	Re-signed to a one-year contract.	
December 13, 2022	CSI	Chicago Red Stars	DF	(United States) USA	Tatumn Milazzo	—	2024	Signed new two-year contract with an option for an additional year.	
December 13, 2022	TFO	Chicago Red Stars	FW	(United States) USA	Sarah Luebbert	(Mexico) Club América	????	Transferred for an undisclosed fee.	
December 15, 2022	CXT	Angel City FC	DF	(United States) USA	Paige Nielsen	—	2024	Signed to a two-year contract extension.	
December 17, 2022	LRE	(Australia) Western Sydney Wanderers	MF	(United States) USA	Tess Boade	North Carolina Courage	2022	Returned from loan on December 17, 2022, due to injury.	
December 19, 2022	CRE	Houston Dash	DF	(United States) USA	Ally Prisock	—	2024	Re-signed to a two-year contract.	
December 19, 2022	CRE	Kansas City Current	DF	(United States) USA	Hailie Mace	—	2025	Re-signed to a three-year contract.	
December 19, 2022	FAS	Washington Spirit	DF	(United States) USA	Amber Brooks	—	2023	Free agent re-signed to a one-year contract.	
December 20, 2022	CRE	Kansas City Current	DF	(United States) USA	Kate Del Fava	—	2024	Re-signed to a two-year contract.	
December 22, 2022	DIS?	(Sweden) FC Rosengård	FW	(Sweden) SWE	Mimmi Larsson	Kansas City Current	2024	Signed to a two-year contract.	
December 22, 2022	FAS	Washington Spirit	GK	(United States) USA	Nicole Barnhart	—	2023	Free agent re-signed to a one-year contract.	
December 23, 2022	TFI	(Brazil) Palmeiras	MF	(Brazil) BRA	Ary Borges	Racing Louisville FC	2025	Signed to a three-year contract.	
December 23, 2022	WAI	Kansas City Current	MF	(United States) USA	Addie McCain	—	2022	Waived.	
January 3, 2023	CRE	North Carolina Courage	GK	(United States) USA	Casey Murphy	—	2025	Re-signed through 2025 on a guaranteed contract.	
January 5, 2023	CRE	Houston Dash	DF	(United States) USA	Annika Creel	—	2023	Re-signed to a one-year contract with a club option for an additional year.	
January 5, 2023	CRE	Kansas City Current	DF	(United States) USA	Alex Loera	—	2025	Re-signed to a three-year contract.	
January 5, 2023	CRE	North Carolina Courage	MF	(United States) USA	Brianna Pinto	—	2025	Re-signed through 2025 on a guaranteed contract.	
January 5, 2023	TRP	Portland Thorns FC	MF	(United States) USA	Yazmeen Ryan	Angel City FC	????	Component of a three-club trade.	
January 5, 2023	TRA	Angel City FC	Fifth-overall pick in the 2023 NWSL Draft.; Angel City's natural second-round pick in the 2024 NWSL Draft.; $200,000 in NWSL allocation money.			Portland Thorns FC	—	Component of a three-club trade.	
January 5, 2023	TRP	Angel City FC	MF	(United States) USA	Yazmeen Ryan	NJ/NY Gotham FC	????	Component of a three-club trade.	
January 5, 2023	TRA	Angel City FC	$250,000 in NWSL allocation money.			NJ/NY Gotham FC	—	Component of a three-club trade.	
January 5, 2023	TRA	NJ/NY Gotham FC	First-overall pick in the 2023 NWSL Draft.			Angel City FC	—	Component of a three-club trade.	
January 5, 2023	TRA	NJ/NY Gotham FC	$350,000 in NWSL allocation money.; Gotham FC's natural fourth-round pick in the 2024 NWSL Draft.			Orlando Pride	—	Traded.	
January 5, 2023	TRA	Orlando Pride	Second-overall pick in the 2023 NWSL Draft.			NJ/NY Gotham FC	—	Traded.	
January 6, 2023	CRE	OL Reign	MF	(United States) USA	Nikki Stanton	—	2023	Re-signed to a one-year contract.	
January 6, 2023	DIS?	—	GK	(Canada) CAN	Devon Kerr	Houston Dash	2023	Signed to a contract through the 2023 season.	
January 8, 2023	CEX	Chicago Red Stars	DF	(United States) USA	Zoe Morse	—	2022	Contract expired; new contract offer declined.	
January 9, 2023	CRE	Houston Dash	MF	(United States) USA	Emily Curran	—	2023	Re-signed to a one-year contract with an option for an additional year.	
January 9, 2023	FAS	North Carolina Courage	MF	(Brazil) BRA	Debinha	Kansas City Current	2024	Free agent signed to a two-year contract with an option for an additional year.	
January 9, 2023	WIR	Racing Louisville FC	MF	(United States) USA	Addie McCain	Chicago Red Stars	2024	Acquired from the Re-entry Wire and signed to a two-year contract with an option for a third year.	
January 10, 2023	CEX	Racing Louisville FC	MF	(United States) USA	Jaelin Howell	—	2025	Signed to a contract extension for a third year through 2025.	
January 10, 2023	CRE	OL Reign	DF	(United States) USA	Lauren Barnes	—	2024	Re-signed to a two-year contract.	
January 11, 2023	CRE	OL Reign	FW	(United States) USA	Megan Rapinoe	—	2023	Re-signed to a one-year contract.	
January 11, 2023	FAS	North Carolina Courage	MF	(Jamaica) JAM	Havana Solaun	Houston Dash	2024	Free agent signed to a two-year contract.	
January 11, 2023	TRP	Kansas City Current	FW	(United States) USA	Elyse Bennett	OL Reign	????	Traded.	
January 11, 2023	TRA	Kansas City Current	23rd-overall pick in the 2023 NWSL Draft.			OL Reign	—	Traded.	
January 11, 2023	TRA	OL Reign	$150,000 in NWSL allocation money.			Kansas City Current	—	Traded.	
January 11, 2023	WIR	Racing Louisville FC	FW	(United States) USA	Jenna Bike	Chicago Red Stars	2024	Acquired from the Re-entry Wire and signed to a two-year contract with an option for a third year.	
January 12, 2023	FAS	Orlando Pride	MF	(United States) USA	Meggie Dougherty Howard	San Diego Wave FC	2024	Free agent signed to a two-year contract.	
January 12, 2023	TRP	Kansas City Current	FW	(United States) USA	Lynn Williams	NJ/NY Gotham FC	2023	Traded.	
January 12, 2023	TRA	NJ/NY Gotham FC	Second-overall pick in the 2023 NWSL Draft.			Kansas City Current	—	Traded.	
January 12, 2023	TRP	NJ/NY Gotham FC	FW	(United States) USA	Paige Monaghan	Racing Louisville FC	????	Traded.	
January 12, 2023	TRA	NJ/NY Gotham FC	$150,000 in NWSL allocation money.; 2023 international roster spot.			Racing Louisville FC	—	Traded.	
January 12, 2023	TRA	Racing Louisville FC	Fourth-overall pick in the 2023 NWSL Draft.			NJ/NY Gotham FC	—	Traded.	
January 12, 2023	TRA	Washington Spirit	$75,000 in NWSL allocation money.			Orlando Pride	—	Traded.	
January 12, 2023	TRA	Orlando Pride	29th-overall pick in the 2023 NWSL Draft.; 34th-overall pick in the 2023 NWSL Draft.			Washington Spirit	—	Traded.	
January 12, 2023	TRA	Washington Spirit	29th-overall pick in the 2023 NWSL Draft.; $30,000 in NWSL allocation money.			Racing Louisville FC	—	Traded.	
January 12, 2023	TRA	Racing Louisville FC	28th-overall pick in the 2023 NWSL Draft.			Washington Spirit	—	Traded.	
January 12, 2023	TRA	NJ/NY Gotham FC	13th-overall pick in the 2023 NWSL Draft.			San Diego Wave FC	—	Traded.	
January 12, 2023	TRA	San Diego Wave FC	$100,000 in NWSL allocation money.			NJ/NY Gotham FC	—	Traded.	
January 12, 2023	TRA	OL Reign	23rd-overall pick in the 2023 NWSL Draft.; 2023 international roster spot.; OL Reign's natural third-round pick in the 2024 NWSL Draft.			Chicago Red Stars	—	Traded	
January 12, 2023	TRA	Chicago Red Stars	19th-overall pick in the 2023 NWSL Draft.			OL Reign	—	Traded	
January 12, 2023	TRP	North Carolina Courage	FW	(Mexico) MEX	Diana Ordóñez	Houston Dash	2023	Traded.	
January 12, 2023	TRA	North Carolina Courage	30th-overall pick in the 2023 NWSL Draft.			Houston Dash	—	Traded.	
January 12, 2023	TRA	Houston Dash	Eighth-overall pick in the 2023 NWSL Draft.; Houston Dash's natural first-round pick in the 2024 NWSL Draft.; 2023 international roster spot.; $100,000 in NWSL allocation money.			North Carolina Courage	—	Traded.	
January 12, 2023	TRP	Washington Spirit	DF	(United States) USA	Emily Sonnett	OL Reign	????	Traded.	
January 12, 2023	TRA	OL Reign	32nd-overall pick in the 2023 NWSL Draft.; OL Reign's natural first-round pick in the 2024 NWSL Draft.			Washington Spirit	—	Traded.	
January 12, 2023	TRA	Washington Spirit	32nd-overall pick in the 2023 NWSL Draft.; $30,000 in NWSL allocation money.			Houston Dash	—	Traded.	
January 12, 2023	TRA	Houston Dash	30th-overall pick in the 2023 NWSL Draft.			Washington Spirit	—	Traded.	
January 12, 2023	TRA	Houston Dash	32nd-overall pick in the 2023 NWSL Draft.			Portland Thorns FC	—	Traded.	
January 12, 2023	TRA	Portland Thorns FC	36th-overall pick in the 2023 NWSL Draft.; $20,000 in NWSL allocation money.			Houston Dash	—	Traded.	
January 12, 2023	TRA	Washington Spirit	$25,000 in NWSL allocation money.			Racing Louisville FC	—	Traded.	
January 12, 2023	TRA	Racing Louisville FC	40th-overall pick in the 2023 NWSL Draft.			Washington Spirit	—	Traded.	
January 12, 2023	TRA	Portland Thorns FC	48th-overall pick in the 2023 NWSL Draft.			Houston Dash	—	Traded.	
January 12, 2023	TRA	Houston Dash	$10,000 in NWSL allocation money.; Houston Dash's natural third-round pick in the 2024 NWSL Draft.			Portland Thorns FC	—	Traded.	
January 14, 2023	TFO	North Carolina Courage	MF	(Japan) JPN	Fuka Nagano	(England) Liverpool	????	Transfer terms not disclosed.	
January 16, 2023	CSI	Washington Spirit	DF	(United States) USA	Sam Staab	—	2025	Signed to a new three-year contract, replacing her previous contract.	
January 17, 2023	CSI	Washington Spirit	DF	(United States) USA	Anna Heilferty	—	2024	Signed to a new two-year contract with a team option for an additional year, replacing her previous contract.	
January 18, 2023	CSI	Washington Spirit	MF	(United States) USA	Jordan Baggett	—	2024	Signed to a new two-year contract, replacing her previous contract.	
January 18, 2023	RET	Orlando Pride	FW	(United States) USA	Darian Jenkins	—	2023	Retired.	
January 18, 2023	WAI	NJ/NY Gotham FC	FW	(United States) USA	Cameron Tucker	Houston Dash	2023	Claimed from the Re-entry Wire.	
January 19, 2023	CRE	North Carolina Courage	DF	(United States) USA	Ryan Williams	—	2025	Re-signed through 2025.	
January 19, 2023	CRE	Washington Spirit	DF	(United States) USA	Tara McKeown	—	2025	Re-signed to a three-year contract with an option for a fourth year.	
January 19, 2023	TFI	(Brazil) Corinthians	FW	(Brazil) BRA	Adriana	Orlando Pride	2025	Transferred for an undisclosed fee involving allocation money on a three-year contract.	
January 19, 2023	TRP	Angel City FC	FW	(United States) USA	Tyler Lussi	North Carolina Courage	????	Traded.	
January 19, 2023	TRP	North Carolina Courage	DF	(United States) USA	Merritt Mathias	Angel City FC	2023	Traded.	
January 20, 2023	CEX	Racing Louisville FC	GK	(United States) USA	Katie Lund	—	2025	Signed to a three-year contract extension.	
January 20, 2023	TFI	(Denmark) BK Häcken	FW	(Denmark) DEN	Mille Gejl	North Carolina Courage	2024	Signed to a two-year contract. Transfer terms, if any, were not disclosed.	
January 23, 2023	CRE	North Carolina Courage	FW	(United States) USA	Brittany Ratcliffe	—	2023	Free agent re-signed through 2023, with a mutual option to extend through 2024.	
January 23, 2023	TRP	Racing Louisville FC	DF	(United States) USA	Emily Fox	North Carolina Courage	????	Traded.	
January 23, 2023	TRP	Racing Louisville FC	DF	(New Zealand) NZL	Abby Erceg	North Carolina Courage	????	Traded.	
January 23, 2023	TRP	North Carolina Courage	DF	(United States) USA	Carson Pickett	Racing Louisville FC	????	Traded.	
January 24, 2023	CRE	Kansas City Current	MF	(Canada) CAN	Desiree Scott	—	2023	Free agent re-signed to a one-year contract.	
January 24, 2023	CRE	North Carolina Courage	GK	(United States) USA	Katelyn Rowland	—	2025	Free agent re-signed through 2025.	
January 24, 2023	REL	Orlando Pride	GK	(Canada) CAN	Erin McLeod	—	2023	Contract mutually terminated.	
January 24, 2023	REL	Orlando Pride	MF	(Iceland) ISL	Gunnhildur Jónsdóttir	—	2023	Contract mutually terminated.	
January 25, 2023	FAS	San Diego Wave FC	MF	(Mexico) MEX	Katie Johnson	Angel City FC	2024	Free agent signed to a two-year contract.	
January 25, 2023	FAS	Washington Spirit	DF	(United States) USA	Kelley O'Hara	NJ/NY Gotham FC	2024	Free agent signed through 2024.	
January 25, 2023	TFI	(Brazil) Palmeiras	MF	(Brazil) BRA	Julia Bianchi	Chicago Red Stars	2024	Signed to a two-year contract.	
January 25, 2023	TRP	Angel City FC	MF	(United States) USA	Cari Roccaro	Chicago Red Stars	????	Traded.	
January 25, 2023	TRA	Chicago Red Stars	$65,000 in NWSL allocation money.			Angel City FC	—	Traded.	
January 27, 2023	CRE	Portland Thorns FC	DF	(United States) USA	Meaghan Nally	—	2024	Re-signed through 2024 with an option for 2025.	
January 27, 2023	CRE	Portland Thorns FC	DF	(United States) USA	Tegan McGrady	—	2023	Re-signed through 2023 with an option for 2024.	
January 27, 2023	CRE	Portland Thorns FC	FW	(United States) USA	Hannah Betfort	—	2024	Re-signed through 2024 with an option for 2025.	
January 27, 2023	CRE	Portland Thorns FC	FW	(United States) USA	Michele Vasconcelos	—	2023	Free agent re-signed through 2023 with an option for 2024.	
January 27, 2023	CRE	Portland Thorns FC	GK	(United States) USA	Shelby Hogan	—	2025	Re-signed through 2025 with an option for 2026.	
January 29, 2023	TFI	(Denmark) FC Nordsjælland	GK	(United States) USA	Carly Nelson	Orlando Pride	2024	Free transfer signed to a two-year contract with an option for an additional year.	
January 30, 2023	CRE	Houston Dash	FW	(Cameroon) CMR	Michaela Abam	—	2023	Re-signed to a one-year contract.	
January 30, 2023	CRE	Houston Dash	MF	(United States) USA	Kelcie Hedge	—	2023	Re-signed to a one-year contract.	
January 30, 2023	CRE	Houston Dash	MF	(United States) USA	Makamae Gomera-Stevens	—	2023	Re-signed to a one-year contract.	
January 30, 2023	CSI	Kansas City Current	MF	(United States) USA	Sam Mewis	—	2023	Previous contract bought out; re-signed to a one-year contract.	
January 30, 2023	CSI	Washington Spirit	GK	(United States) USA	Aubrey Kingsbury	—	2025	Signed to a new three-year contract with an option for a fourth year.	
January 30, 2023	LOU	Angel City FC	DF	(Jamaica) JAM	Allyson Swaby	(France) Paris Saint-Germain	2023	Loaned through June 2023 for the 2022–23 Division 1 Féminine season.	
January 30, 2023	WIR	NJ/NY Gotham FC	FW	(United States) USA	Cameron Tucker	Houston Dash	????	Acquired off waivers via the Re-entry Wire.	
February 1, 2023	TRP	Orlando Pride	DF	(United States) USA	Courtney Petersen	Houston Dash	????	Traded.	
February 1, 2023	TRA	Orlando Pride	Orlando Pride's natural third-round pick in the 2024 NWSL Draft.			Houston Dash	—	Traded.	
February 1, 2023	TRA	Houston Dash	$65,000 in NWSL allocation money.; $25,000 in NWSL allocation money, pending conditions met.			Orlando Pride	—	Traded.	
February 2, 2023	LOU	Racing Louisville FC	FW	(United States) USA	Riley Parker	(Mexico) Tigres UANL	2023	Loaned through 2022–23 Liga MX Femenil Clausura in June 2023.	
February 2, 2023	TFI	(Mexico) Tigres UANL	FW	(Nigeria) NGR	Uchenna Kanu	Racing Louisville FC	2024	Transferred for a $150,000 fee paid with NWSL allocation money, with an additional $30,000 fee if Kanu scores 12 or more goals during the 2023 NWSL season. Signed to a two-year contract with an option for an additional year.	
February 2, 2023	WAI	NJ/NY Gotham FC	DF	(United States) USA	Kelly Ann Livingstone	—	2023	Waived.	
February 6, 2023	CEX	Racing Louisville FC	DF	(United States) USA	Paige Monaghan	—	2025	Signed to a three-year contract extension.	
February 7, 2023	TFI	(France) Olympique Lyon	MF	(France) FRA	Inès Jaurena	Washington Spirit	2023	Free transfer signed to a one-year contract.	
February 7, 2023	DIS?	(Germany) Bayern Munich	DF	(Sweden) SWE	Hanna Glas	Kansas City Current	2024	Signed to a two-year contract with a mutual option for an additional year.	
February 7, 2023	TFO	(Japan) Tokyo Verdy Beleza	MF	(Japan) JPN	Narumi Miura	North Carolina Courage	2024	Transferred for an undisclosed fee. Under contract through 2024.	
February 7, 2023	TRI	(Mexico) Monterrey	MF	(Venezuela) VEN	Bárbara Olivieri	Houston Dash	2023	Free transfer signed to a one-year contract with an option for an additional year.	
February 10, 2023	LOU	Houston Dash	FW	(Argentina) ARG	Paulina Gramaglia	(Brazil) Red Bull Bragantino	2023	Loaned out until December 31, 2023.	
February 17, 2023	CSI	Washington Spirit	DF	(United States) USA	Dorian Bailey	—	2025	Signed to a new three-year contract, replacing her existing contract expiring after the 2023 season.	
February 18, 2023	WAI	Racing Louisville FC	DF	(United States) USA	Taylor Malham	—	2023	Waived.	
February 19, 2023	WAI	Houston Dash	DF	(United States) USA	Julia Ashley	—	2023	Waived.	
February 23, 2023	TFI	(Brazil) Grêmio	MF	(Brazil) BRA	Luany	OL Reign	2025	Transferred for a $50,000 fee, which included NWSL allocation money, and signed to a three-year contract.	
March 2, 2023	CXT	Angel City FC	GK	(Bosnia and Herzegovina) BIH	DiDi Haračić	—	2024	Signed to a two-year contract extension with a third-year option.	
March 2, 2023	LOU	Chicago Red Stars	FW	(Australia) AUS	Chelsie Dawber	(Sweden) IFK Norrköping	2023	Loaned until the end of the 2023 Damallsvenskan in November.	
March 2, 2023	LRE	(Australia) Adelaide United FC	FW	(Australia) AUS	Chelsie Dawber	Chicago Red Stars	2023	Recalled early from loan.	
March 3, 2023	U18	(United States) AFC Ann Arbor	MF	(United States) USA	Chloe Ricketts	Washington Spirit	2025	Signed to a three-year contract as an under-18 player, with an option for a fourth year.	
March 13, 2023	CEX	Racing Louisville FC	DF	(United States) USA	Carson Pickett	—	2025	Signed to a three-year contract extension.	
March 15, 2023	RET	San Diego Wave FC	GK	(England) ENG	Carly Telford	—	2023	Retired.	
March 20, 2023	DIS	—	MF	(United States) USA	Taylor Malham	Chicago Red Stars	2023	Acquired via discovery after being waived by Racing Louisville FC and signed to a one-year contract.	
March 24, 2023	LOU	OL Reign	DF	(Mexico) MEX	Jimena López	(Iceland) Selfoss	2023	Loaned out through June 30, 2023.	
March 25, 2023	FAS	Racing Louisville FC	FW	(Jamaica) JAM	Cheyna Matthews	Chicago Red Stars	2023	Free agent signed to a one-year contract with an option for an additional year.	
March 25, 2023	IRP	—	FW	(United States) USA	Brenna Lovera	Chicago Red Stars	2023	Preseason trialist signed to a short-term Injury Replacement Player contract for Addie McCain.	
March 25, 2023	IRP	—	GK	(United States) USA	Mackenzie Wood	—	2023	Preseason trialist signed to a short-term Injury Replacement Player contract for Emily Boyd.	
March 25, 2023	PST	—	DF	(United States) USA	Sami Feller	Chicago Red Stars	2025	Preseason trialist signed to a three-year contract with an option for an additional year.	
March 25, 2023	PST	—	GK	(United States) USA	Savannah Madden	Houston Dash	2023	Preseason trialist signed to a one-year contract with an option for an additional year.	
March 28, 2023	IRP	—	DF	(United States) USA	Cheyenne Shorts	San Diego Wave FC	2023	Signed to a short-term Injury Replacement Player contract.	
March 29, 2023	LEX	(Australia) Newcastle Jets FC	FW	(United States) USA	Sarah Griffith	Chicago Red Stars	2023	Returned from loan.	
March 29, 2023	PST	—	DF	(United States) USA	Brianna Martinez	Orlando Pride	2023	Pre-season trialist signed to a one-year contract with an option for an additional year.	
March 29, 2023	TFI	(Mexico) Club América	FW	(Mexico) MEX	Scarlett Camberos	Angel City FC	2024	Transferred for an undisclosed fee and signed to a two-year contract.	
March 30, 2023	WAI	Houston Dash	FW	(Cameroon) CMR	Michaela Abam	—	2023	Waived.	
March 30, 2023	WAI	Houston Dash	MF	(United States) USA	Elizabeth Eddy	—	2023	Waived.	
April 3, 2023	DIS?	—	FW	(Canada) CAN	Amanda Allen	Orlando Pride	2025	Signed to a three-year contract.	
April 6, 2023	RET	Orlando Pride	FW	(United States) USA	Leah Pruitt	—	2023	Retired.	
April 7, 2023	CRE	Orlando Pride	MF	(Brazil) BRA	Thais Reiss	—	2023	Re-signed to a one-year contract with an option for an additional year.	
April 7, 2023	NTR	—	GK	(United States) USA	Meagan McClelland	Chicago Red Stars	2023	Signed to a short-term National Team Replacement Player contract for Alyssa Naeher.	
April 7, 2023	TRI	(France) Reims	GK	(Mexico) MEX	Emily Alvarado	Houston Dash	2023	Free transfer signed to a one-year contract with an option for an additional year.	
April 7, 2023	TRP	NJ/NY Gotham FC	MF	(Canada) CAN	Victoria Pickett	North Carolina Courage	????	Traded.	
April 7, 2023	TRA	North Carolina Courage	$200,000 in NWSL allocation money.			NJ/NY Gotham FC	—	Traded.	
April 13, 2023	LIN	(England) Manchester United	FW	(Canada) CAN	Adriana Leon	Portland Thorns FC	2023	Short-term loan through June 30, 2023.	
April 14, 2023	PST	—	DF	(United States) USA	Croix Soto	Kansas City Current	2024	Preseason trialist signed to a one-year contract.	
April 16, 2023	LIN	(Germany) VfL Wolfsburg	MF	(Germany) GER	Sandra Starke	Chicago Red Stars	2023	Loaned through June 30, 2023.	
April 17, 2023	FAS	—	MF	(United States) USA	Julie Ertz	Angel City FC	2023	Free agent signed to a one-year contract.	
April 18, 2023	IRP	—	FW	(United States) USA	Maliah Morris	Orlando Pride	2023	Signed to a short-term Injury Replacement Player contract.	
April 25, 2023	NTR	—	MF	(United States) USA	Maddie Pokorny	Racing Louisville FC	2023	Signed to a short-term National Team Replacement Player contract.	
April 25, 2023	TRP	Washington Spirit	MF	(United States) USA	Jordan Baggett	Racing Louisville FC	2024	Traded.	
April 25, 2023	TRA	Racing Louisville FC	Racing Louisville FC's second-round pick in the 2024 NWSL Draft.; Conditional third-round pick in the 2025 NWSL Draft, should Baggett make 10 appearances in 2023.			Washington Spirit	—	Traded.	
April 25, 2023	WAI	NJ/NY Gotham FC	GK	(United States) USA	Hensley Hancuff	—	2023	Waived.	
April 26, 2023	TFI	(England) London City Lionesses	GK	(United States) USA	Shae Yáñez	San Diego Wave FC	2024	Transferred for an undisclosed fee and signed to a two-year contract with an option for an additional year.	
May 20, 2023	LOU	Angel City FC	DF	(Canada) CAN	Vanessa Gilles	(France) Olympique Lyon	2024	Loan extended through June 2024 for the 2023–24 Division 1 Féminine season.	
June 1, 2023	TFI	(France) Olympique Lyon	MF	(France) FRA	Amandine Henry	Angel City FC	2025	Signed on a free transfer to a three-year contract with an option for a fourth year.	
June 2, 2023	CXT	OL Reign	FW	(United States) USA	Elyse Bennett	—	2024	Contract extended through 2024.	
June 10, 2023	WAI	Houston Dash	DF	(United States) USA	Annika Creel	—	2023	Waived.	
June 14, 2023	CEX	San Diego Wave FC	DF	(United States) USA	Naomi Girma	—	2026	Signed to a three-year contract with an option for an additional year, which the club exercised.	
June 16, 2023	REL	Houston Dash	MF	(United States) USA	Kelcie Hedge	—	2023	Contract terminated by mutual agreement.	
June 20, 2023	COP	Washington Spirit	FW	(United States) USA	Ashley Hatch	—	2024	Contract option for 2024 exercised.	
June 20, 2023	CSI	Washington Spirit	DF	(Canada) CAN	Gabrielle Carle	—	2025	Signed to a new three-year contract with an option for an additional year, modifying her existing contract signed in 2022.	
June 20, 2023	CSI	Washington Spirit	MF	(United States) USA	Andi Sullivan	—	2025	Signed to a new three-year contract with an option for an additional year, replacing her previous contract expiring in 2023.	
June 20, 2023	CXT	NJ/NY Gotham FC	FW	(United States) USA	Lynn Williams	—	2025	Contract extended through 2025.	
June 22, 2023	TFO	Portland Thorns FC	MF	(United States) USA	Lindsey Horan	(France) Olympique Lyon	2026	Transferred for a fee of €250,000 with a conditional €50,000 bonus and signed to a three-year contract through June 2026.	
June 25, 2023	IRP	—	MF	(United States) USA	Mana Shim	NJ/NY Gotham FC	2023	Signed to a short-term Injury Replacement Player contract. Previously retired from Houston Dash.	
June 26, 2023	NTR	—	DF	(United States) USA	Kelly Ann Livingstone	OL Reign	2023	Signed to a short-term National Team Replacement Player contract.	
June 26, 2023	NTR	—	FW	(United States) USA	Jadyn Edwards	OL Reign	2023	Signed to a short-term National Team Replacement Player contract.	
June 26, 2023	NTR	—	FW	(United States) USA	McKenzie Weinert	OL Reign	2023	Signed to a short-term National Team Replacement Player contract.	
June 26, 2023	NTR	—	MF	(United States) USA	Kelly Fitzgerald	OL Reign	2023	Signed to a short-term National Team Replacement Player contract.	
June 26, 2023	NTR	—	MF	(United States) USA	Natalie Viggiano	OL Reign	2023	Signed to a short-term National Team Replacement Player contract.	
June 27, 2023	NTR	—	DF	(United States) USA	Chai Cortez	San Diego Wave FC	2023	Signed to a short-term National Team Replacement Player contract.	
June 27, 2023	NTR	—	DF	(United States) USA	Nikia Smith	North Carolina Courage	2023	Signed to a short-term National Team Replacement Player contract.	
June 27, 2023	NTR	—	DF	(United States) USA	Sarah Clark	North Carolina Courage	2023	Signed to a short-term National Team Replacement Player contract.	
June 27, 2023	NTR	—	DF	(Guyana) GUY	Sydney Cummings	San Diego Wave FC	2023	Signed to a short-term National Team Replacement Player contract.	
June 27, 2023	NTR	—	FW	(United States) USA	Maliah Morris	Orlando Pride	2023	Signed to a short-term National Team Replacement Player contract.	
June 27, 2023	NTR	—	FW	(United States) USA	Shea Connors	San Diego Wave FC	2023	Signed to a short-term National Team Replacement Player contract.	
June 27, 2023	NTR	—	GK	(United States) USA	Hensley Hancuff	North Carolina Courage	2023	Signed to a short-term National Team Replacement Player contract.	
June 27, 2023	NTR	—	GK	(United States) USA	McKinley Crone	Orlando Pride	2023	Signed to a short-term National Team Replacement Player contract.	
June 28, 2023	NTR	—	DF	(United States) USA	Elizabeth Eddy	Angel City FC	2023	Signed to a short-term National Team Replacement Player contract.	
June 28, 2023	NTR	—	DF	(United States) USA	Jordan Thompson	Washington Spirit	2023	Signed to a short-term National Team Replacement Player contract.	
June 28, 2023	NTR	—	DF	(United States) USA	Kelsey Hill	Angel City FC	2023	Signed to a short-term National Team Replacement Player contract.	
June 28, 2023	NTR	—	FW	(Venezuela) VEN	Mariana Speckmaier	Washington Spirit	2023	Signed to a short-term National Team Replacement Player contract.	
June 28, 2023	REL	Chicago Red Stars	FW	(United States) USA	Brenna Lovera	—	2023	Released.	
June 28, 2023	TRI	(Italy) Roma	MF	(Brazil) BRA	Andressa	Houston Dash	2024	Free transfer signed through 2024 with an option for an additional year.	
June 29, 2023	CXT	Angel City FC	DF	(New Zealand) NZL	Ali Riley	—	2025	Signed to a contract extension through the 2025 season.	
June 29, 2023	NTR	Portland Thorns FC	DF	(United States) USA	Kayla Morrison	(Australia) Melbourne Victory FC	2023	Signed to a short-term National Team Replacement Player contract.	
June 30, 2023	TFI	(France) Paris FC	FW	(France) FRA	Ouleymata Sarr	Washington Spirit	2025	Free transfer signed to a three-year contract.	
June 30, 2023	LEX	Chicago Red Stars	MF	(Germany) GER	Sandra Starke	(Germany) VfL Wolfsburg	2023	Returned from loan.	
June 30, 2023	TFO	Orlando Pride	FW	(Malta) MLT	Haley Bugeja	(Italy) Inter Milan	????	Transferred for an undisclosed fee.	
July 3, 2023	CRE	OL Reign	DF	(Mexico) MEX	Jimena López	—	2024	Re-signed through the end of the 2024 season.	
July 3, 2023	LOU	OL Reign	DF	(Mexico) MEX	Jimena López	(Spain) Valencia	2024	Loaned out through June 30, 2024.	
July 3, 2023	TFI	(England) Arsenal	DF	(Brazil) BRA	Rafaelle Souza	Orlando Pride	2025	Free transfer signed to a three-year contract.	
July 3, 2023	TFI	(Norway) Vålerenga	DF	(Denmark) DEN	Stine Ballisager Pedersen	Kansas City Current	2024	Transferred for an undisclosed fee and signed through the 2024 season with an option for an additional year.	
July 5, 2023	TFI	(France) Paris FC	DF	(France) FRA	Annaïg Butel	Washington Spirit	2024	Free transfer signed to a two-year contract.	
July 6, 2023	NTR	—	MF	(United States) USA	Hope Breslin	Houston Dash	2023	Signed to a short-term National Team Replacement Player contract.	
July 6, 2023	NTR	(Colombia) Deportivo Cali	MF	(Colombia) COL	Isabel Dehakiz	Portland Thorns FC	2023	Signed to a short-term National Team Replacement Player contract.	
July 6, 2023	TFI	(Spain) Atlético Madrid	MF	(Spain) ESP	Maitane López	NJ/NY Gotham FC	2024	Free transfer signed to a two-year contract with an option for an additional year.	
July 6, 2023	TFI	(Mexico) Club León	FW	(Argentina) ARG	Mariana Larroquette	Orlando Pride	2025	Free transfer signed to a two-year contract, to join the squad after the 2023 FIFA Women's World Cup.	
July 7, 2023	NTR	—	GK	(United States) USA	Meagan McClelland	San Diego Wave FC	2023	Signed to a short-term National Team Replacement Player contract.	
July 9, 2023	REL	NJ/NY Gotham FC	MF	(Japan) JPN	Nahomi Kawasumi	—	2023	Contract mutually terminated.	
July 17, 2023	TFI	(Japan) Tokyo Verdy Beleza	MF	(Japan) JPN	Rikako Kobayashi	North Carolina Courage	2024	Free transfer signed to a two-year contract with an option for an additional year.	
July 20, 2023	NTR	—	DF	(United States) USA	Ella Shamburger	Racing Louisville FC	2023	Signed to a short-term National Team Replacement Player contract.	
July 20, 2023	NTR	(Finland) Åland United	MF	(United States) USA	Taylor Aylmer	Racing Louisville FC	2023	Signed to a short-term National Team Replacement Player contract.	
July 20, 2023	LIN	(Norway) SK Brann	FW	(United States) USA	Alyssa Walker	Portland Thorns FC	2023	Signed to a short-term loan with fee until September 1, 2023.	
July 20, 2023	GKR	(Portugal) S.F. Damaiense	GK	(United States) USA	Lindsey Harris	Portland Thorns FC	2023	Signed to a short-term Goalkeeper Replacement contract due to a knee injury to Lauren Kozal.	
July 21, 2023	CEX	—	DF	(United States) USA	Malia Berkely	North Carolina Courage	2026	Signed to a guaranteed three-year contract extension effective January 1, 2024.	
July 24, 2023	DIS	—	DF	(Brazil) BRA	Lauren	North Carolina Courage	—	Acquired negotiation rights via discovery.	
July 24, 2023	TRA	Kansas City Current	$100,000 in NWSL allocation money.; 2024 international roster spot.			North Carolina Courage	—	Traded.	
July 24, 2023	TRA	North Carolina Courage	Exclusive rights to negotiate with Lauren.			Kansas City Current	—	Traded.	
July 24, 2023	TFI	(Spain) Madrid CFF	DF	(Brazil) BRA	Lauren	Kansas City Current	2024	Free transfer signed to a contract through 2024 with an option for an additional year.	

Clubs without a flag are NWSL clubs.

Type column key

- CEX: Contract allowed to expire without re-signing, resulting in the player being either waived to the Re-entry Wire or for discovery, or released if eligible for free agency.
- COP: Contract option action.
- CRE: Contract re-signed for a player with an expiring contract.
- CSI: New contract signed, overriding an active contract (if any).
- CXT: Existing contract's terms extended.
- DIS: Rights acquired via discovery; not a transfer. NWSL player rights are limited by the discovery claim.
- FAS: Signed as a free agent; not a transfer or discovery claim, and rights are either not limited or limited only by the league's terms of free agency.
- GKR: Short-term Goalkeeper Replacement signing; does not count toward a club's roster or salary cap.
- IRP: Short-term Injury Replacement Player signing; does not count toward a club's roster or salary cap.
- LEX: Loan to another club expired.
- LIN: Loaned in from another club.
- LOU: Loaned out to another club.
- LRE: Recalled from a loan to another club.
- NTR: Short-term National Team Replacement Player signing; doesn't count toward a club's roster or salary cap.
- PST: Signed as a preseason trialist.
- REL: Player released, contract terminated, resulting in the player being either waived to the Re-entry Wire or for discovery, or released if eligible for free agency.
- RET: Player retired. The NWSL club might retain the player's rights within the league.
- TFI: Transferred in from another league or if unattached, subject to the NWSL's discovery process if the player has fewer than six years' playing tenure in the NWSL. Might involve a transfer fee paid by the club using NWSL allocation money.
- TFO: Transferred out to a club in another league. Might involve a transfer fee, which would be paid to the NWSL and distributed to the club as allocation money.
- TRA: Non-player assets, such as selection order in the NWSL Draft or other acquisition mechanisms, international roster spots, NWSL expansion draft immunity, and NWSL allocation money, traded to another NWSL team.
- TRP: Player or player's rights traded to another NWSL team.
- WAI: Player or player's rights waived. If the player is not a free agent, the contract and NWSL player rights are distributed via the league Re-entry Wire, then via discovery if not selected on the wire.
- WIR: Player whose rights were acquired via the Re-entry Wire.

== See also ==
- 2023 National Women's Soccer League season
- 2023 NWSL Draft
- List of foreign NWSL players
- List of most expensive women's association football transfers
