= 2023 Orlando Pride season =

Orlando Pride
2023 season
- Head coach: Seb Hines
- Stadium: Exploria Stadium; Orlando, Florida
- NWSL: 7th of 12
- Playoffs: Did not qualify
- Challenge Cup: Group stage (4th of 4)
- Top goalscorer: League: Messiah Bright (6); All: Messiah Bright (7)
- Highest home attendance: 8,504 (Oct 15 vs. Houston Dash, NWSL)
- Lowest home attendance: League: 3,730 (Aug 25 vs. San Diego Wave); All: 3,139 (Apr 19 vs. North Carolina Courage, Challenge Cup)
- Average home league attendance: 5,504
Home colors	Away colors
- All statistics correct as of October 15, 2023.

The 2023 Orlando Pride season was Orlando Pride's eighth season in the National Women's Soccer League, the top division of women's soccer in the United States.

== Notable events ==
On November 11, 2022, Seb Hines was confirmed as permanent head coach having acted as interim head coach from June 7, 2022, following the suspension of Amanda Cromwell. In the same announcement, it was stated Ian Fleming had been removed as general manager after 24 months in the role. Haley Carter was named as general manager and VP of soccer operations on January 30, 2023.

On February 28, 2023, having played the previous season wearing white shorts as part of the secondary kit, the club announced they were making the switch to black shorts to make players more comfortable when playing during their menstrual cycle. They became the first NWSL team to do this. Additionally, the names and numbers on the back of the jerseys were changed from silver to the more visible black.

== Roster ==
As of September 24, 2023.

No.	Nationality	Name	Position(s)	Date of birth (age)	Previous club	Notes
Goalkeepers
21	(England)	Anna Moorhouse	GK	March 30, 1995 (aged 27)	(France) Bordeaux	INT
31	(United States)	Carly Nelson	GK	February 11, 1998 (aged 25)	(Denmark) FC Nordsjælland	–
40	(United States)	McKinley Crone	GK	October 20, 1998 (aged 24)	(United States) Alabama Crimson Tide	–
Defenders
2	(United States)	Haley McCutcheon	DF	February 22, 1996 (aged 27)	(United States) Houston Dash	–
3	(United States)	Kylie Strom	DF	March 18, 1992 (aged 31)	(Spain) Atlético Madrid	–
4	(Brazil)	Rafaelle Souza	DF	June 18, 1991 (aged 31)	(England) Arsenal	INT
5	(United States)	Megan Montefusco	DF	September 3, 1992 (aged 30)	(United States) Houston Dash	–
6	(United States)	Emily Madril	DF	July 1, 1999 (aged 23)	(Sweden) BK Häcken	–
12	(United States)	Carrie Lawrence	DF	July 15, 1997 (aged 25)	(United States) UCF Knights	SEI
13	(Spain)	Celia	DF	June 20, 1995 (aged 27)	(United States) OL Reign	–
25	(United States)	Kerry Abello	DF	September 17, 1999 (aged 23)	(United States) Penn State Nittany Lions	–
26	(United States)	Caitlin Cosme	DF	January 19, 1999 (aged 24)	(United States) Duke Blue Devils	–
32	(United States)	Brianna Martinez	DF	April 22, 2000 (aged 22)	(United States) Notre Dame Fighting Irish	–
Midfielders
8	(United States)	Mikayla Cluff	MF	February 25, 1999 (aged 24)	(United States) BYU Cougars	–
14	(United States)	Viviana Villacorta	MF	February 2, 1999 (aged 24)	(United States) UCLA Bruins	SEI
15	(United States)	Erika Tymrak	MF	August 7, 1991 (aged 31)	(United States) Utah Royals	–
19	(Canada)	Jordyn Listro	MF	August 10, 1995 (aged 27)	(United States) North Carolina Courage	–
28	(United States)	Summer Yates	MF	June 17, 2000 (aged 22)	(United States) Washington Huskies	–
30	(Brazil)	Thais Reiss	MF	December 9, 1999 (aged 23)	(United States) North Florida Ospreys	INT
Forwards
7	(Argentina)	Mariana Larroquette	FW	October 24, 1992 (aged 30)	(Mexico) Club León	INT
9	(Brazil)	Adriana	FW	November 17, 1996 (aged 26)	(Brazil) Corinthians	INT
10	(Brazil)	Marta	FW	February 19, 1986 (aged 37)	(Sweden) FC Rosengård	–
11	(United States)	Ally Watt	FW	March 12, 1997 (aged 26)	(United States) OL Reign	–
20	(United States)	Julie Doyle	FW	August 30, 1998 (aged 24)	(United States) Santa Clara Broncos	–
23	(United States)	Messiah Bright	FW	January 12, 2000 (aged 23)	(United States) TCU Horned Frogs	–
29	(Canada)	Amanda Allen	FW	February 21, 2005 (aged 18)	(Canada) NDC Ontario	INT

== Staff ==
As of March 3, 2023.

Executive
Majority owner and chairman	(United States) Mark Wilf
Majority owner and vice-chair	(United States) Zygi Wilf
Majority owner and vice-chair	(United States) Leonard Wilf
President of business operations	(United States) Jarrod Dillon
General manager	(United States) Haley Carter
Coaching staff
Head coach	(England) Seb Hines
Assistant coach	(Jamaica) Giles Barnes
Assistant coach	(Sweden) Yolanda Thomas
Goalkeeper coach	(England) Paul Crichton
Director of medical & performance	(United States) Cory Price
Strength and conditioning coach	(United States) Christi Edson

== Match results ==
=== Friendlies ===
Five friendly matches were scheduled with all but one played behind closed doors.

February 18	Orlando Pride	2–0	Gotham FC	Bradenton, Florida
	Tymrak 3'; Doyle 41'	Report		Stadium: IMG Academy
Note: Closed-door scrimmage

February 23	Orlando Pride	2–0	Kansas City Current	Orlando, Florida
6:30 pm	Doyle 1'; Watt 63'	Report		Stadium: Exploria Stadium

February 28	UCF Knights	0–2	Orlando Pride	Orlando, Florida
		Report	Reiss 58'; Bugeja 83'	Stadium: UCF Soccer and Track Stadium
Note: Closed-door scrimmage

March 4	Florida State Seminoles	1–2	Orlando Pride	Tallahassee, Florida
	Goal	Report	Madril 22'; Adriana 45'	Stadium: Seminole Soccer Complex
Note: Closed-door scrimmage

March 17	Orlando Pride	3–2	Washington Spirit	Kissimmee, Florida
1:00 pm	Abello; Bright		Goal	Stadium: Osceola County Stadium
Note: Closed-door scrimmage

=== National Women's Soccer League ===
The NWSL regular season will be played on a balanced schedule i.e. each team will play every other team twice; once at home and once away. The top six teams will qualify for the playoffs with the top two receiving a first-round bye.

==== Results summary ====
Overall								Home						Away					
Pld	W	D	L	GF	GA	GD	Pts	W	D	L	GF	GA	GD	W	D	L	GF	GA	GD
22	10	1	11	27	28	−1	31	7	0	4	18	11	+7	3	1	7	9	17	−8

Last updated: October 15, 2023.
Source: NWSLsoccer.com

==== Results by round ====
Round	1	2	3	4	5	6	7	8	9	10	11	12	13	14	15	16	17	18	19	20	21	22
Stadium	A	H	H	A	A	H	A	H	A	A	H	A	H	A	H	H	H	A	H	A	A	H
Result	L	L	L	L	W	W	D	W	L	L	W	L	L	W	W	W	L	L	W	W	L	W
Position (Note: ORL's position at the end of the matchweek, not their match.)	12	12	12	12	12	10	10	8	9	9	8	9	10	9	8	7	7	9	7	7	7	7

Updated to match(es) played on October 15, 2023. Source: NWSLsoccer.com
A = Away; H = Home; W = Win; D = Draw; L = Loss

Results

March 26 1	Portland Thorns	4–0	Orlando Pride	Portland, Oregon
5:00 pm	Weaver 16'; Smith 22'; Sugita 49'; Vasconcelos 76'	Report	Cluff (yellow card) 10'; Doyle (yellow card) 70'; Cosme (yellow card) 72'	Stadium: Providence Park; Attendance: 15,204; Referee: Eric Tattersall

April 2 2	Orlando Pride	1–2	Angel City FC	Orlando, Florida
5:30 pm	Madril (yellow card) 37'; Bright 51'; Strom (yellow card) 55'; McCutcheon (yellow card) 87'	Report	Nielsen (yellow card) 19'; Emslie 39' (pen.); Hammond (yellow card) 48'; Johnson 90+10'	Stadium: Exploria Stadium; Attendance: 7,137; Referee: Danielle Chesky

April 15 3	Orlando Pride	0–2	Gotham FC	Orlando, Florida
7:00 pm		Report	Ryan (yellow card) 45+2'; Farrelly (yellow card) 83'; Purce 90+10' (pen.); Williams 90+17'	Stadium: Exploria Stadium; Attendance: 5,258; Referee: Elvis Osmanovic

April 23 4	Kansas City Current	2–0	Orlando Pride	Kansas City, Kansas
5:00 pm	Debinha 64'; Kizer 68'	Report	Watt (yellow card) 58'	Stadium: Children's Mercy Park; Attendance: 9,808; Referee: Karen Callado

April 29 5	San Diego Wave	1–3	Orlando Pride	San Diego, California
10:00 pm	Shaw 12'; Colaprico (yellow card) 52'	Report	Cluff 26'; Montefusco (yellow card) 27'; McCutcheon 42'; Adriana 69'	Stadium: Snapdragon Stadium; Attendance: 16,225; Referee: Brad Jensen

May 6 6	Orlando Pride	1–0	Racing Louisville	Orlando, Florida
7:00 pm	Bright 21'; Adriana (yellow card) 27'	Report	Howell (yellow card) 43'	Stadium: Exploria Stadium; Attendance: 5,106; Referee: Jeremy Scheer

May 14 7	Gotham FC	0–0	Orlando Pride	Harrison, New Jersey
5:30 pm	O'Hara (yellow card) 35'; Farrelly (yellow card) 66'; Zerboni (yellow card) 90'	Report		Stadium: Red Bull Arena; Attendance: 3,468; Referee: Anya Voigt

May 20 8	Orlando Pride	2–1	Washington Spirit	Orlando, Florida
7:00 pm	Marta 23' (pen.); Strom 77'; McCutcheon (yellow card) 90+5'	Report	Rodman (yellow card) 15'; Staab 28'; Sullivan (yellow card) 36'; McKeown (yellow card) 83'	Stadium: Exploria Stadium; Attendance: 4,290; Referee: Thomas Snyder

May 27 9	Chicago Red Stars	1–0	Orlando Pride	Bridgeview, Illinois
8:00 pm	Nagasato 22'	Report		Stadium: SeatGeek Stadium; Attendance: 5,646; Referee: Rebecca Pagan

June 3 10	Houston Dash	2–0	Orlando Pride	Houston, Texas
8:30 pm	Hirst 6'; Anderson (yellow card) 11'; Alozie 41'; Tucker (yellow card) 75'	Report	Madril (yellow card) 61'	Stadium: PNC Stadium; Attendance: 4,863; Referee: Adam Kilpatrick

June 11 11	Orlando Pride	3–1	Portland Thorns	Orlando, Florida
7:00 pm	Adriana 26', 47', (yellow card) 90+4'; Montefusco (yellow card) 64'; Bright 69'	Report	Hubly (yellow card) 8'; Smith 20'; Kuikka (yellow card) 25'	Stadium: Exploria Stadium; Attendance: 7,319; Referee: Danielle Chesky

June 17 12	North Carolina Courage	3–0	Orlando Pride	Cary, North Carolina
7:00 pm	Kerolin 32'; Speck 77'; McCutcheon 83' (o.g.)	Report	Doyle (yellow card) 33'	Stadium: WakeMed Soccer Park; Attendance: 4,014; Referee: Calin Radosav

June 24 13	Orlando Pride	1–2	Kansas City Current	Orlando, Florida
7:00 pm	McCutcheon (yellow card) 45+6'; Marta 58' (pen.); Bright (yellow card) 90+2'	Report	Debinha 29'; Kizer 45+1'; Gautrat (yellow card) 54'; Hamilton (yellow card) 56'; Del Fava (yellow card) 73'; Miller (yellow card) 87'; Cooper (yellow card) 89'	Stadium: Exploria Stadium; Attendance: 6,473; Referee: Eric Tattersall

July 1 14	Washington Spirit	0–3	Orlando Pride	Buzzard Point, Washington D.C.
7:00 pm	Hatch (yellow card) 76'	Report	Doyle 8', 16'; Abello (yellow card) 46'; McKeown 61' (o.g.); Montefusco (yellow card) 67'	Stadium: Audi Field; Attendance: 8,901; Referee: Anya Voigt
Note: Kickoff delayed by 1 hour 19 minutes due to inclement weather.

July 7 15	Orlando Pride	1–0	OL Reign	Orlando, Florida
7:00 pm	Bright 16'	Report	Stanton (yellow card) 69'; Bennett (yellow card) 76'	Stadium: Exploria Stadium; Attendance: 6,424; Referee: JC Griggs

August 20 16	Orlando Pride	5–0	Chicago Red Stars	Orlando, Florida
7:00 pm	Souza 15'; Bright 24', 49'; Larroquette 64'; Cluff 68'	Report	Hocking (yellow card) 25'	Stadium: Exploria Stadium; Attendance: 5,904; Referee: Anya Voigt

August 25 17	Orlando Pride	1–2	San Diego Wave	Orlando, Florida
7:00 pm	Adriana 44'; Bright (yellow card) 59'	Report	Dahlkemper 7'; Carusa 75'; Hill (yellow card) 81'	Stadium: Exploria Stadium; Attendance: 3,730; Referee: Matt Thompson

September 3 18	OL Reign	1–0	Orlando Pride	Seattle, Washington
6:00 pm	Huitema 49'	Report	Moorhouse (red card) 3'	Stadium: Lumen Field; Attendance: 10,106; Referee: Ricardo Fierro

September 17 19	Orlando Pride	2–1	North Carolina Courage	Orlando, Florida
7:00 pm	Watt 1'; Souza (yellow card) 16'; Adriana 32'	Report	Matsukubo 52'; Lussi (yellow card) 69'; Berkely (red card) 78'; Williams (yellow card) 88'	Stadium: Exploria Stadium; Attendance: 5,907; Referee: Danielle Chesky

October 2 20	Angel City FC	0–1	Orlando Pride	Los Angeles, California
10:00 pm		Report	Adriana 22'; Cluff (yellow card) 29'	Stadium: Banc of California Stadium; Attendance: 18,102; Referee: Brandon Stevis

October 6 21	Racing Louisville	3–2	Orlando Pride	Louisville, Kentucky
7:30 pm	Nadim 87' (pen.); Davis 70', (yellow card) 90+2'; Moorhouse 74' (o.g.); DeMelo (yellow card) 90+5'	Report	Marta 17' (pen.), (yellow card) 59'; Abello 21'; Strom (yellow card) 82'	Stadium: Lynn Family Stadium; Attendance: 6,455; Referee: Kevin Broadley

October 15 22	Orlando Pride	1–0	Houston Dash	Orlando, Florida
5:00 pm	Marta 87' (pen.); Watt (yellow card) 89'	Report	Puntigam (yellow card) 29'; Sánchez (yellow card) 81'	Stadium: Exploria Stadium; Attendance: 8,504; Referee: Natalie Simon

League standings

Pos	Team	Pld	W	D	L	GF	GA	GD	Pts	Qualification
1	San Diego Wave FC (S)	22	11	4	7	31	22	+9	37	NWSL Shield, Playoff semifinals, and CONCACAF W Champions Cup
2	Portland Thorns FC	22	10	5	7	42	32	+10	35	Playoff semifinals and W Champions Cup
3	North Carolina Courage	22	9	6	7	29	22	+7	33	Playoff quarterfinals
4	OL Reign	22	9	5	8	29	24	+5	32	Playoff quarterfinals
5	Angel City FC	22	8	7	7	31	30	+1	31	Playoff quarterfinals
6	NJ/NY Gotham FC (C)	22	8	7	7	25	24	+1	31	Playoff quarterfinals
7	Orlando Pride	22	10	1	11	27	28	−1	31	
8	Washington Spirit	22	7	9	6	26	29	−3	30	
9	Racing Louisville FC	22	6	9	7	25	24	+1	27	
10	Houston Dash	22	6	8	8	16	18	−2	26	
11	Kansas City Current	22	8	2	12	30	36	−6	26	
12	Chicago Red Stars	22	7	3	12	28	50	−22	24	

Source: NWSL
Rules for classification: Tiebreakers
(C) Champions and W Champions Cup; (S) NWSL Shield

=== NWSL Challenge Cup ===
Unlike previous seasons, the 2023 NWSL Challenge Cup schedule was spread across the season with the group stage played between April and August. There were three groups each containing four teams, with each team playing a six-game round robin home and away series. The top team from each group progressed to the semifinals along with the highest-ranked group runner-up. Orlando were once again paired in the East region with Washington Spirit, North Carolina Courage and NJ/NY Gotham FC.

April 19 Group stage	Orlando Pride	1–1	North Carolina Courage	Orlando, Florida
7:00 pm	Strom (yellow card) 19'; Cluff (yellow card) 42'; Watt 56'; Nelson (yellow card) 90+5'	Report	Speck (yellow card) 38'; O'Sullivan 90+9'	Stadium: Exploria Stadium; Attendance: 3,139; Referee: Gabriele Giusti

May 10 Group stage	Washington Spirit	4–2	Orlando Pride	Buzzard Point, Washington D.C.
7:30 pm	Silano 33'; Staab 37'; Sheva 42'; Hatch (yellow card) 81'; Jaurena (yellow card) 86'; Sanchez 90+4'	Report	Hansen 10'; Martinez (yellow card) 37'; Watt 49'	Stadium: Audi Field; Attendance: 4,991; Referee: Joshua Encarnacion

June 7 Group stage	Gotham FC	P–P	Orlando Pride	Harrison, New Jersey
7:30 pm				Stadium: Red Bull Arena
Note: Postponed due to air quality concerns as a result of 2023 Canadian wildfires.

June 28 Group stage	Orlando Pride	P–P	Gotham FC	Orlando, Florida
7:00 pm		Report		Stadium: Exploria Stadium
Note: Postponed to July 23 due to Gotham FC weather and travel delays.

July 23 Group stage	Orlando Pride	1–3	Gotham FC	Orlando, Florida
7:00 pm	Montefusco 9'; Martínez (yellow card) 45+2'; Listro (yellow card) 63'	Report	Nighswonger 35' (pen.); Zerboni 55'; Ryan 57'	Stadium: Exploria Stadium; Attendance: 4,051; Referee: Shawn Tehini
Note: Rescheduled from June 28

July 29 Group stage	North Carolina Courage	5–0	Orlando Pride	Cary, North Carolina
7:00 pm	Ratcliffe 17'; Berkely 38'; Tagliaferri 48'; Pinto (yellow card) 65'; Hopkins 78', 89'	Report	Yates (yellow card) 68'	Stadium: WakeMed Soccer Park; Attendance: 3,543; Referee: Greg Dopka

August 4 Group stage	Orlando Pride	0–1	Washington Spirit	Orlando, Florida
7:00 pm		Report	Huster (yellow card) 88'; Speckmaier 90+8'	Stadium: Exploria Stadium; Attendance: 3,661; Referee: Brad Jensen

August 9 Group stage	Gotham FC	1–1	Orlando Pride	Harrison, New Jersey
7:30 pm	Sheehan (yellow card) 53'; Shim (yellow card) 84', (goal) 90+1'	Report	Cluff (yellow card) 37'; Montefusco (yellow card) 45+3'; Bright 32'	Stadium: Red Bull Arena; Attendance: 2,038; Referee: Jeremy Scheer
Note: Rescheduled from June 7

Standings

Pos	Team	Pld	W	T	L	GF	GA	GD	Pts	Qualification	NC	NJY	WAS	ORL
1	North Carolina Courage	6	3	2	1	15	5	+10	11	Advance to knockout stage	—	1–1	6–0	0–0
2	NJ/NY Gotham FC	6	3	2	1	10	7	+3	11		2–0	—	1–0	1–1
3	Washington Spirit	6	3	0	3	10	13	−3	9		1–2	4–2	—	4–2
4	Orlando Pride	6	0	2	4	5	15	−10	2		1–1	1–3	0–1	—

Source: NWSL

== Squad statistics ==
=== Appearances ===
As of match played October 15, 2023

Starting appearances are listed first, followed by substitute appearances after the + symbol where applicable.

No.	Pos	Nat	Player	Total		NWSL		Challenge Cup	
No.	Pos	Nat	Player	Apps	Goals	Apps	Goals	Apps	Goals
Goalkeepers
21	GK	(England) ENG	Anna Moorhouse	23	0	19	0	4	0
31	GK	(United States) USA	Carly Nelson	4	0	2+1	0	1	0
40	GK	(United States) USA	McKinley Crone	0	0	0	0	0	0
Defenders
2	DF	(United States) USA	Haley McCutcheon	26	1	22	1	2+2	0
3	DF	(United States) USA	Kylie Strom	26	1	22	1	4	0
4	DF	(Brazil) BRA	Rafaelle Souza	7	1	7	1	0	0
5	DF	(United States) USA	Megan Montefusco	19	1	12+3	0	4	1
6	DF	(United States) USA	Emily Madril	27	0	22	0	5	0
12	DF	(United States) USA	Carrie Lawrence	0	0	0	0	0	0
13	DF	(Spain) ESP	Celia	10	0	1+7	0	2	0
25	DF	(United States) USA	Kerry Abello	25	1	14+6	1	4+1	0
26	DF	(United States) USA	Caitlin Cosme	6	0	4	0	2	0
32	DF	(United States) USA	Brianna Martinez	12	0	0+8	0	3+1	0
Midfielders
8	MF	(United States) USA	Mikayla Cluff	27	2	17+5	2	4+1	0
14	MF	(United States) USA	Viviana Villacorta	21	0	13+3	0	4+1	0
15	MF	(United States) USA	Erika Tymrak	19	0	10+3	0	4+2	0
19	MF	(Canada) CAN	Jordyn Listro	20	0	7+8	0	4+1	0
28	MF	(United States) USA	Summer Yates	16	0	0+10	0	2+4	0
30	MF	(Brazil) BRA	Thais Reiss	3	0	0	0	1+2	0
Forwards
7	FW	(Argentina) ARG	Mariana Larroquette	5	1	0+5	1	0	0
9	FW	(Brazil) BRA	Adriana	20	6	19	6	0+1	0
10	FW	(Brazil) BRA	Marta	18	4	17+1	4	0	0
11	FW	(United States) USA	Ally Watt	25	3	6+13	1	4+2	2
20	FW	(United States) USA	Julie Doyle	20	2	11+5	2	4	0
23	FW	(United States) USA	Messiah Bright	28	7	16+6	6	3+3	1
29	FW	(Canada) CAN	Amanda Allen	6	0	0+3	0	1+2	0
Players away from the club on loan:
22	DF	(United States) USA	Tori Hansen	2	1	0	0	2	1
24	GK	(United States) USA	Kaylie Collins	2	0	1	0	1	0
Players who appeared for the club but left during the season:
7	FW	(Malta) MLT	Haley Bugeja	2	0	0+1	0	1	0
36	FW	(United States) USA	Maliah Morris	3	0	0	0	0+3	0

=== Goalscorers ===
As of match played October 15, 2023

Rank	No.	Pos.	Name	NWSL	Cup	Total
1	23	FW	(United States) Messiah Bright	6	1	7
2	9	FW	(Brazil) Adriana	6	0	6
3	10	FW	(Brazil) Marta	4	0	4
4	11	FW	(United States) Ally Watt	1	2	3
5	8	MF	(United States) Mikayla Cluff	2	0	2
5	20	FW	(United States) Julie Doyle	2	0	2
7	2	DF	(United States) Haley McCutcheon	1	0	1
7	3	DF	(United States) Kylie Strom	1	0	1
7	4	DF	(Brazil) Rafaelle Souza	1	0	1
7	5	DF	(United States) Megan Montefusco	0	1	1
7	7	FW	(Argentina) Mariana Larroquette	1	0	1
7	22	DF	(United States) Tori Hansen	0	1	1
7	25	DF	(United States) Kerry Abello	1	0	1
Own goals				1	0	1
Total				27	5	32

=== Shutouts ===
As of match played October 15, 2023

Rank	No.	Pos.	Name	NWSL	Cup	Total
1	21	GK	(England) Anna Moorhouse	7	0	7
Total				7	0	7

=== Disciplinary record ===
As of match played October 15, 2023

No.	Pos.	Name	NWSL			Cup			Total		
No.	Pos.	Name	Yellow card	(yellow card) (yellow-red card)	Red card	Yellow card	(yellow card) (yellow-red card)	Red card	Yellow card	(yellow card) (yellow-red card)	Red card
2	DF	(United States) Haley McCutcheon	3	0	0	0	0	0	3	0	0
3	DF	(United States) Kylie Strom	2	0	0	1	0	0	3	0	0
4	DF	(Brazil) Rafaelle Souza	1	0	0	0	0	0	1	0	0
5	DF	(United States) Megan Montefusco	3	0	0	1	0	0	4	0	0
6	DF	(United States) Emily Madril	2	0	0	0	0	0	2	0	0
8	MF	(United States) Mikayla Cluff	2	0	0	2	0	0	4	0	0
9	FW	(Brazil) Adriana	2	0	0	0	0	0	2	0	0
10	FW	(Brazil) Marta	1	0	0	0	0	0	1	0	0
11	FW	(United States) Ally Watt	2	0	0	0	0	0	2	0	0
19	MF	(Canada) Jordyn Listro	0	0	0	1	0	0	1	0	0
20	FW	(United States) Julie Doyle	2	0	0	0	0	0	2	0	0
21	GK	(England) Anna Moorhouse	0	0	1	0	0	0	0	0	1
23	FW	(United States) Messiah Bright	2	0	0	0	0	0	2	0	0
25	DF	(United States) Kerry Abello	1	0	0	0	0	0	1	0	0
26	DF	(United States) Caitlin Cosme	1	0	0	0	0	0	1	0	0
28	MF	(United States) Summer Yates	0	0	0	1	0	0	1	0	0
31	GK	(United States) Carly Nelson	0	0	0	1	0	0	1	0	0
32	DF	(United States) Brianna Martinez	0	0	0	2	0	0	2	0	0
Total			24	0	1	9	0	0	33	0	1

== Transfers and loans ==
=== 2023 NWSL Draft ===
Draft picks are not automatically signed to the team roster. The 2023 college draft was held on January 12, 2023. Orlando made five selections.

Round	Pick	Player	Pos.	College	Status
1	3	(United States) Emily Madril	DF	Florida State University	Under contract (Note: Madril signed a centralized contract with the NWSL in August 2022 and was loaned to BK Häcken FF in order to make her playing rights available in the 2023 NWSL Draft.)
2	21	(United States) Messiah Bright	FW	Texas Christian University	Signed
3	25	(United States) Tori Hansen	DF	University of North Carolina	Signed
4	39	(United States) Summer Yates	MF	(Washington (state)) University of Washington	Signed
4	41	(United States) Kristen Scott	FW	University of Central Florida	Not signed

=== Transfers in ===
Date	Player	Pos.	Previous club	Fee/notes	Ref.
January 19, 2023	(Brazil) Adriana	FW	(Brazil) Corinthians	Undisclosed fee.	
January 29, 2023	(United States) Carly Nelson	GK	(Denmark) FC Nordsjælland	Free agent signing.	
March 29, 2023	(United States) Brianna Martinez	DF	(United States) Notre Dame Fighting Irish	Free agent signing.	
April 3, 2023	(Canada) Amanda Allen	FW	(Canada) NDC Ontario	Free agent signing.	
April 7, 2023	(Brazil) Thais Reiss	MF	(United States) Orlando Pride	Free agent signing.	
April 18, 2023	(United States) Maliah Morris	FW	(United States) Clemson Tigers	Short-term injury replacement contract.	
June 27, 2023	(United States) Maliah Morris	FW	(United States) Orlando Pride	National team replacement player contract.	
June 27, 2023	(United States) McKinley Crone	GK	(United States) Alabama Crimson Tide	National team replacement player contract.	
July 3, 2023	(Brazil) Rafaelle Souza	DF	(England) Arsenal	Free agent signing.	
July 7, 2023	(Argentina) Mariana Larroquette	FW	(Mexico) Club León		

=== Transfers out ===
Date	Player	Pos.	Destination club	Fee/notes	Ref.
October 18, 2022	(United States) Kelly Rowswell	GK	(Iceland) Valur	End of injury replacement contract	
November 15, 2022	(Brazil) Thais Reiss	MF	(United States) Orlando Pride	Out of contract	
November 15, 2022	(United States) Parker Roberts	MF		Out of contract	
November 15, 2022	(United States) Chelsee Washington	MF		Waived	
November 15, 2022	(United States) Toni Pressley	DF	(Iceland) Breiðablik	Out of contract	
January 12, 2023	(United States) Meggie Dougherty Howard	MF	(United States) San Diego Wave FC	Free agent	
January 18, 2023	(United States) Darian Jenkins	FW	Retired		
January 24, 2023	(Canada) Erin McLeod	GK	(Iceland) Stjarnan	Mutually terminated contract	
January 24, 2023	(Iceland) Gunnhildur Jónsdóttir	MF	(Iceland) Stjarnan	Mutually terminated contract	
February 1, 2023	(United States) Courtney Petersen	DF	(United States) Houston Dash	Rights traded with a natural third-round pick in the 2024 NWSL Draft in exchange for $65,000 in allocation money plus an additional $25,000, pending conditions met.	
April 6, 2023	(United States) Leah Pruitt	FW	Retired		
June 30, 2023	(Malta) Haley Bugeja	FW	(Italy) Inter Milan	Undisclosed fee.	
October 2, 2023	(United States) Maliah Morris	FW	(Australia) Western Sydney Wanderers	End of national team replacement contract.	

=== Loans out ===
Date	Player	Pos.	Loaned to	Notes	Ref.
September 12, 2023	(United States) Tori Hansen	DF	(Australia) Melbourne Victory	Until May 2024	
September 13, 2023	(United States) Kaylie Collins	GK	(Australia) Western Sydney Wanderers	Until May 2024	

=== Preseason trialists ===
Orlando Pride began preseason training on January 30, 2023. The squad included three non-roster invitees on trial with the team during preseason. Reiss returned to Orlando having played with the Pride during the previous season before her contract expired. Nicole Baxter was a free agent having been at NJ/NY Gotham FC since 2019. McKinley Crone was an undrafted rookie out of the University of Alabama. A further three trialists appeared during a preseason friendly against Kansas City Current on February 23: Jamaican international defender Konya Plummer returned having not played since her release by Orlando Pride in 2021, undrafted rookie Maliah Morris out of Clemson University, and Channing Foster who had been waived by Chicago Red Stars at the end of her rookie season in 2022. Rookie defender Brianna Martinez, who played five seasons at Notre Dame before being drafted by Racing Louisville FC in 2023, was also later added as a non-roster invitee during preseason. Kansas City Current draft pick Mykiaa Minniss also trained with the Pride during preseason.

2023 Orlando Pride trialists
Player	Position	Previous team
(Brazil) Thais Reiss	MF	(United States) Orlando Pride
(United States) McKinley Crone	GK	(United States) Alabama Crimson Tide
(United States) Nicole Baxter	MF	(United States) NJ/NY Gotham FC
(Jamaica) Konya Plummer	DF	(United States) Orlando Pride
(United States) Maliah Morris	FW	(United States) Clemson Tigers
(United States) Channing Foster	MF	(United States) Chicago Red Stars
(United States) Brianna Martinez	DF	(United States) Notre Dame Fighting Irish
(United States) Mykiaa Minniss	DF	(United States) Washington State Cougars

Signed to first team contract.
Signed to short-term injury replacement contract.
Signed to National Team Replacement contract.
