= Caitlin Cosme =

American soccer player

Personal information
- Full name: Caitlin Meghani Cosme
- Date of birth: January 19, 1999 (age 27)
- Place of birth: New Hyde Park, New York, United States
- Height: 5 ft 5 in (1.65 m)
- Position: Defender

Youth career
- Albertson Fury

College career
Years	Team	Apps	(Gls)
2017–2021	Duke Blue Devils	70	(10)

Senior career*
Years	Team	Apps	(Gls)
2018	Long Island Fury		
2021	Gotham FC Reserves		
2022–2023	Orlando Pride	4	(0)
2024	Stjarnan	11	(2)
2024–2026	FC Nantes	33	(2)
2026-	Crystal Palace	0	(0)

International career^{‡}
2013	United States U14		
2014	United States U15		
2025–	Puerto Rico	1	(0)
- * Club domestic league appearances and goals as of 15 September 2026 ‡ National team caps and goals as of May 29, 2025

Caitlin Meghani Cosme (born January 19, 1999) is a professional footballer who plays as a defender for Women's Super League club Crystal Palace. Born in the mainland United States, she plays for the Puerto Rico national team. Cosme played college soccer for the Duke Blue Devils, winning one ACC title, before being drafted 10th overall in the 2022 NWSL Draft by Orlando Pride.

== Early life ==
Born in New Hyde Park, New York, Cosme attended Herricks High School and helped lead the varsity soccer team to the quarterfinals in the state playoffs in her junior and senior years. She was named High School All-American as a senior and became the first defender to be awarded MVP for the East squad. She also played club soccer for ECNL team Albertson Fury. Cosme left high school as the No. 5 ranked defender in the 2017 recruiting class nationally and the No. 1 recruit from the state of New York.

== College career ==
Cosme played five seasons of college soccer for the Blue Devils at Duke University between 2017 and 2021 while majoring in psychology. As a freshman, Cosme was limited to one appearance totaling six minutes, making her debut against Miami Hurricanes on October 15, 2017. Duke won the ACC regular season title. After struggling with mononucleosis all of preseason, Cosme again saw limited playing time as a sophomore, playing four regular season games all as a substitute. Towards the end of the season however, she got an opportunity to play in the 2018 NCAA Tournament, starting all three games as Duke reached the round of 16.

In her junior year, Cosme played in all 20 games including 18 starts and scored her first goal for Duke in a 4–1 win over Syracuse Orange. Ahead of her senior campaign, Cosme was voted a team captain. She started all 21 games, scoring a career-high and team-leading six goals including a postseason game-winner in a 1–0 win over Ole Miss in the third round. Individually, Cosme was named first-team All-Atlantic Region by United Soccer Coaches in 2020. In 2021, Cosme opted to use the additional year of eligibility granted by the NCAA due to the COVID-19 pandemic. For the third consecutive season, she featured in every game, starting in all but one of her 21 appearances. She scored three goals including a postseason game-winner in a 1–0 win over Old Dominion in the first round, converting a free kick from outside the box with 16 seconds left.

While at college, Cosme spent the 2018 offseason playing in the Women's Premier Soccer League with Long Island Fury and joined the NJ/NY Gotham FC reserves for the 2021 WPSL season.

== Club career ==
On December 18, 2021, Cosme was selected in the first round (10th overall) of the 2022 NWSL Draft by Orlando Pride. Orlando had traded up during the draft to acquire the pick along with Leah Pruitt, Celia and a second-round pick in the 2023 NWSL Draft from OL Reign in exchange for Phoebe McClernon. On January 31, 2022, Cosme signed a two-year contract with Orlando. She sustained a knee injury in preseason and, despite returning to be named as a substitute six times across July and August, ended the season back on the injury report and did not make an appearance as a rookie. She made her debut on March 26, 2023, starting Orlando's 2023 season opener, a 4–0 defeat away to Portland Thorns FC. She was released upon the expiry of her contract at the end of the 2023 season having made six appearances in all competitions.

On April 4, 2024, Cosme signed a contract with Besta deild kvenna club Stjarnan.

In the summer of 2024, Cosme moved to French club FC Nantes ahead of the team's first season after gaining promotion to the Première Ligue. She spent two seasons with Nantes before departing in July 2026.

On September 15, 2026, it was announced that Cosme had signed for Women's Super League club Crystal Palace.

== International career ==
Cosme has previously been a member of the United States national team at under-14 and under-15 level. In February 2022, Cosme was named to the senior Puerto Rico national team during 2022 CONCACAF W Championship qualification but did not accept the call-up.

In May 2025, she received another call from Puerto Rico national team, making her debut on May 29 against Guatemala women's national football team.

== Personal life ==
Both of Cosme's parents were professional tennis players. Her father, John, played tennis at Hampton University and Brooklyn College before playing professionally from 1984 to 1986. Her mother, Hemel, played at UC Santa Barbara and then played professionally from 1988 to 1991. She has one sister, Taylor, who played tennis at Emory and Brown (2015–19).

She is of Puerto Rican and Indian descent.

In 2023, Cosme became a Global Ambassador for Grassroot Soccer, an adolescent health organization that leverages the power of soccer to equip young people with the life-saving information, services, and mentorship they need to live healthier lives.

== Career statistics ==
=== College summary ===
School	Season	Division	Apps	Goals
Duke Blue Devils	2017	Div. I	1	0
Duke Blue Devils	2018	Div. I	7	0
Duke Blue Devils	2019	Div. I	20	1
Duke Blue Devils	2020–21	Div. I	21	6
Duke Blue Devils	2021	Div. I	21	3
Career total			70	10

=== Club summary ===
As of August 9, 2023

Club	Season	League			Cup (Note: Includes the NWSL Challenge Cup)		Playoffs (Note: Includes NWSL Playoffs)		Total	
Club	Season	Division	Apps	Goals	Apps	Goals	Apps	Goals	Apps	Goals
Orlando Pride	2022	NWSL	0	0	0	0	—		0	0
Orlando Pride	2023	NWSL	4	0	2	0	—		6	0
Career total			4	0	2	0	0	0	6	0

== Honors ==
Duke Blue Devils

- Atlantic Coast Conference regular season: 2017
