= Thais Reiss =

Brazilian footballer (born 1999)

Personal information
- Full name: Thais Reiss de Araújo
- Date of birth: 9 December 1999 (age 26)
- Place of birth: Curitiba, Brazil
- Height: 5 ft 6 in (1.68 m)
- Positions: Forward; midfielder

Youth career
- Coritiba

College career
Years	Team	Apps	(Gls)
2017–2021	North Florida Ospreys	77	(42)

Senior career*
Years	Team	Apps	(Gls)
2022–2023	Orlando Pride	5	(0)
2024	Villarreal	3	(0)
2024–2026	Spokane Zephyr	5	(1)

International career^{‡}
2016	Brazil U17	1	(0)
2017–2018	Brazil U20	4	(0)
- * Club domestic league appearances and goals as of 18 May 2026 ‡ National team caps and goals as of 12 August 2018

Thais Reiss de Araújo (born 9 December 1999) is a Brazilian professional footballer who most recently played as a forward for USL Super League club Spokane Zephyr. She played college soccer for the North Florida Ospreys. She has been capped internationally for Brazil at youth level.

== Early life ==
Born in Curitiba, Brazil, Reiss attended Marista Santa Maria high school and captained the school's football team for four years. She played club football with Coritiba, winning five youth championships.

=== North Florida Ospreys ===
In 2017, Reiss emigrated to the United States to study for a degree in sport management at the University of North Florida. She played five seasons of college soccer for the North Florida Ospreys, scoring 42 goals and 18 assists in 77 career appearances. Reiss was named ASUN Conference Freshman of the Year in 2017, ASUN Player of the Year in 2020, and earned ASUN All-Conference first-team honours four times. At the time of her departure she ranked second all-time in school history and 10th in ASUN Conference history for goals.

== Club career ==
=== Orlando Pride ===
Having gone undrafted in the 2022 NWSL Draft, Reiss trialled with Orlando Pride for preseason ahead of the 2022 season. She continued to train with the team and eventually signed a contract for the remainder of the season on 11 June 2022. She made her professional debut the following day as an 82nd-minute substitute in a 1–0 defeat away at Chicago Red Stars in the first game under interim head coach Seb Hines. She was released upon the expiry of her contract in November 2022 having made five appearances for the club.

Having returned to Orlando as a trialist during preseason including scoring during a 2–0 friendly win over UCF Knights, Reiss re-signed with the club on a one-year contract on 7 April 2023. Her contract option was declined at the end of the 2023 season.

=== Villarreal ===
On 10 January 2024, Reiss signed a contract with Spanish Liga F club Villarreal.

=== Spokane Zephyr FC ===
On 18 June 2024, Reiss signed with Spokane Zephyr FC for the inaugural season of the USL Super League. Reiss suffered ACL and MCL tears during training in September 2024. On 16 May 2026, she scored her first goal for the club as the Zephyr won 4–0 against Brooklyn FC but missed the playoffs by one point on the final day of the season. The following week, the club folded after two seasons.

== International career ==
In 2016, Reiss was a member of the Brazil under-17 squad at the 2016 FIFA U-17 Women's World Cup, playing the full 90 minutes of a group stage win over Nigeria. In 2018, she was called up to the Brazil under-20 squad for the 2018 FIFA U-20 Women's World Cup and played in all three group games. Brazil failed to progress from the group stage in both tournaments.

== Career statistics ==
=== College ===
School	Season	Division	Apps	Goals
North Florida Ospreys	2017	Div. I	14	6
North Florida Ospreys	2018	Div. I	16	6
North Florida Ospreys	2019	Div. I	19	12
North Florida Ospreys	2020–21	Div. I	12	9
North Florida Ospreys	2021	Div. I	16	9
Career total			77	42

=== Club ===
As of 15 October 2023.

Club	Season	League			Cup		Playoffs		Total	
Club	Season	Division	Apps	Goals	Apps	Goals	Apps	Goals	Apps	Goals
Orlando Pride	2022	NWSL	5	0	0	0	—		5	0
Orlando Pride	2023	NWSL	0	0	3	0	—		3	0
Career total			5	0	3	0	0	0	8	0

== Honours ==
Individual

- ASUN Conference Freshman of the Year: 2017
- ASUN Conference Player of the Year: 2020
