= Haley Bugeja =

Maltese footballer (born 2004)

Personal information
- Date of birth: 5 May 2004 (age 22)
- Place of birth: Pietà, Malta
- Height: 1.75 m (5 ft 9 in)
- Position: Forward

Team information
- Current team: Inter Milan
- Number: 7

Youth career
- Mġarr United

Senior career*
Years	Team	Apps	(Gls)
2018–2020	Mġarr United	29	(52)
2020–2022	Sassuolo	30	(15)
2022–2023	Orlando Pride	4	(0)
2023–	Inter Milan	65	(13)

International career^{‡}
2019–2021	Malta U17	6	(0)
2020–	Malta	46	(24)
- * Club domestic league appearances and goals as of 16 May 2026 ‡ National team caps and goals as of 9 October 2026

Haley Bugeja (born 5 May 2004) is a Maltese professional footballer who plays as a forward for Italian club Inter Milan of Serie A and the Malta women's national team. She previously played for Sassuolo in Italy and Orlando Pride in the NWSL, and has been highlighted by FIFA and local media among Europe's top emerging talents.

== Early life ==
Bugeja was born in Pietà on 5 May 2004. She began playing football at around five years old and initially trained with boys due to the lack of girls’ teams at her age group. In a 2021 report by the national broadcaster, she said she supports Liverpool F.C. and cited Steven Gerrard and Fernando Torres among her early idols.

== Club career ==
=== Mġarr United ===
Bugeja made her senior club debut at the age of 14 for Maltese Women's League club Mġarr United during the 2018–19 season. She finished the season as the league's top scorer with 26 goals and was named the league's Player of the Year at the Malta FA awards. Bugeja retained her player of the year title the following season although, despite matching her 26-goal total from the previous season, she was beaten to the golden boot by Loza Abera of Birkirkara who scored 30. Mġarr United finished second to Birkirkara in the league both seasons.

=== Sassuolo ===
In July 2020, Bugeja signed a three-year deal with Italian Serie A club Sassuolo. She made her debut for the club on 5 September 2020, at the age of 16, in Sassuolo's 3–1 win against Napoli and scored twice on debut.

=== Orlando Pride ===
On 1 July 2022, it was announced Bugeja had signed for Orlando Pride of the National Women's Soccer League (NWSL) through the end of the 2023 season. After five appearances across all competitions, Orlando transferred her to Italian Serie A club Inter Milan on 3 July 2023 for an undisclosed fee; Inter announced the move on 10 July 2023.

=== Inter Milan ===
Bugeja signed through 30 June 2026 and featured regularly for Inter in 2023–24 and 2024–25; local coverage in July 2025 noted a renewed deal and her intent to “push on” after an encouraging season. She has also featured for Inter in UEFA competition in 2025–26.

== International career ==
Bugeja won her first senior cap for Malta as a 14-year-old in April 2019, starting a 2–0 friendly defeat by Romania in Bucharest. She scored her first goal in a 2–1 home friendly defeat by Turkey in January 2020. A first competitive goal arrived in March 2020, in a 2–1 home UEFA Women's Euro 2022 qualifying Group B win over Georgia. In November 2020 she scored a hat-trick in Malta's 4–0 win away to Georgia.

In 2025 Bugeja helped Malta clinch promotion to the Women's Nations League B, scoring her 24th senior international goal to seal victory over Cyprus; reports tallied her at 24 goals in 40 caps at that point.

== Career statistics ==
=== Club ===
As of 1 August 2025.

Club	Season	League			Cup (Note: Coppa Italia and NWSL Challenge Cup)		Playoffs		Other		Total	
Club	Season	Division	Apps	Goals	Apps	Goals	Apps	Goals	Apps	Goals	Apps	Goals
Mġarr United	2018–19	Maltese Women's League	19	26			—		—		19	26
Mġarr United	2019–20	Maltese Women's League	10	26			—		—		10	26
Mġarr United	Total		29	52	0	0	0	0	0	0	29	52
Sassuolo	2020–21	Serie A	18	12	2	0	—		—		20	12
Sassuolo	2021–22	Serie A	12	3	2	0	—		1 (Note: Supercoppa Italiana)	0	15	3
Sassuolo	Total		30	15	4	0	0	0	1	0	35	15
Orlando Pride	2022	NWSL	3	0	0	0	—		—		3	0
Orlando Pride	2023	NWSL	1	0	1	0	—		—		2	0
Orlando Pride	Total		4	0	1	0	0	0	1	0	5	0
Inter Milan	2023–24	Serie A	22	4	0	0	—		—		22	4
Career total			85	71	5	0	0	0	1	0	91	71

=== International ===
Statistics accurate as of match played 9 October 2026.

Year	Malta	
Year	Apps	Goals
2019	2	0
2020	7	6
2021	2	0
2022	4	1
2023	9	11
2024	9	2
2025	7	3
2026	6	1
Total	46	24

=== International goals ===
As of match played 9 October 2026. Malta score listed first, score column indicates score after each Bugeja goal.

No.	Date	Cap	Venue	Opponent	Score	Result	Competition
1	17 January 2020	4	Centenary Stadium, Ta' Qali, Malta	Turkey	1–1	1–2	Friendly
2	5 March 2020	5	Centenary Stadium, Ta' Qali, Malta	Georgia	2–0	2–1	UEFA Women's Euro 2022 qualifying
3	26 November 2020	8	Mikheil Meskhi Stadium, Tbilisi, Georgia	Georgia	1–0	4–0	UEFA Women's Euro 2022 qualifying
4	26 November 2020	8	Mikheil Meskhi Stadium, Tbilisi, Georgia	Georgia	2–0	4–0	UEFA Women's Euro 2022 qualifying
5	26 November 2020	8	Mikheil Meskhi Stadium, Tbilisi, Georgia	Georgia	3–0	4–0	UEFA Women's Euro 2022 qualifying
6	1 December 2020	9	Ramat Gan Stadium, Ramat Gan, Israel	Israel	2–0	2–0	UEFA Women's Euro 2022 qualifying
7	16 February 2022	12	Hibernians Stadium, Paola, Malta	Moldova	3–1	3–1	2022 Malta International Tournament
8	17 February 2023	16	Centenary Stadium, Ta' Qali, Malta	Luxembourg	1–1	2–1	Friendly
9	17 February 2023	16	Centenary Stadium, Ta' Qali, Malta	Luxembourg	2–1	2–1	Friendly
10	7 April 2023	18	Sportland Arena, Tallinn, Estonia	Estonia	1–0	2–1	Friendly
11	22 September 2023	19	Sloka Stadium, Jūrmala, Latvia	Latvia	1–0	1–0	2023–24 UEFA Women's Nations League C
12	26 September 2023	20	Centenary Stadium, Ta' Qali, Malta	Moldova	1–0	2–0	2023–24 UEFA Women's Nations League C
13	26 September 2023	20	Centenary Stadium, Ta' Qali, Malta	Moldova	2–0	2–0	2023–24 UEFA Women's Nations League C
14	27 October 2023	21	Centenary Stadium, Ta' Qali, Malta	Andorra	1–0	5–0	2023–24 UEFA Women's Nations League C
15	27 October 2023	21	Centenary Stadium, Ta' Qali, Malta	Andorra	3–0	5–0	2023–24 UEFA Women's Nations League C
16	31 October 2023	22	Estadi Nacional, Andorra la Vella, Andorra	Andorra	1–0	3–0	2023–24 UEFA Women's Nations League C
17	31 October 2023	22	Estadi Nacional, Andorra la Vella, Andorra	Andorra	2–0	3–0	2023–24 UEFA Women's Nations League C
18	31 October 2023	22	Estadi Nacional, Andorra la Vella, Andorra	Andorra	3–0	3–0	2023–24 UEFA Women's Nations League C
19	22 February 2024	25	Tony Bezzina Stadium, Paola, Malta	Belarus	2–0	2–0	Friendly
20	3 December 2024	33	Centenary Stadium, Ta' Qali, Malta	Hungary	1–1	1–1	Friendly
21	4 April 2025	36	Mikheil Meskhi Stadium, Tbilisi, Georgia	Georgia	2–0	3–2	2025 UEFA Women's Nations League C
22	8 April 2025	37	Centenary Stadium, Ta' Qali, Malta	Georgia	2–0	2–1	2025 UEFA Women's Nations League C
23	30 May 2025	38	National Stadium, Ta' Qali, Malta	Cyprus	1–0	1–0	2025 UEFA Women's Nations League C
24	9 October 2026	46	Centenary Stadium, Ta' Qali, Malta	Luxembourg	1–0	1–0	Friendly

== Honours ==
Individual

- Malta FA Women's League Player of the Year: 2018–19, 2019–20
- Maltese Women's League top goalscorer: 2018–19
- Goal NXGN – Best women's football youth talents (3rd): 2022
- Serie A Team of the Season (Under-23): 2025–26

== See also ==
- List of Malta women's international footballers
