= McKinley Crone =

American soccer player (born 1998)

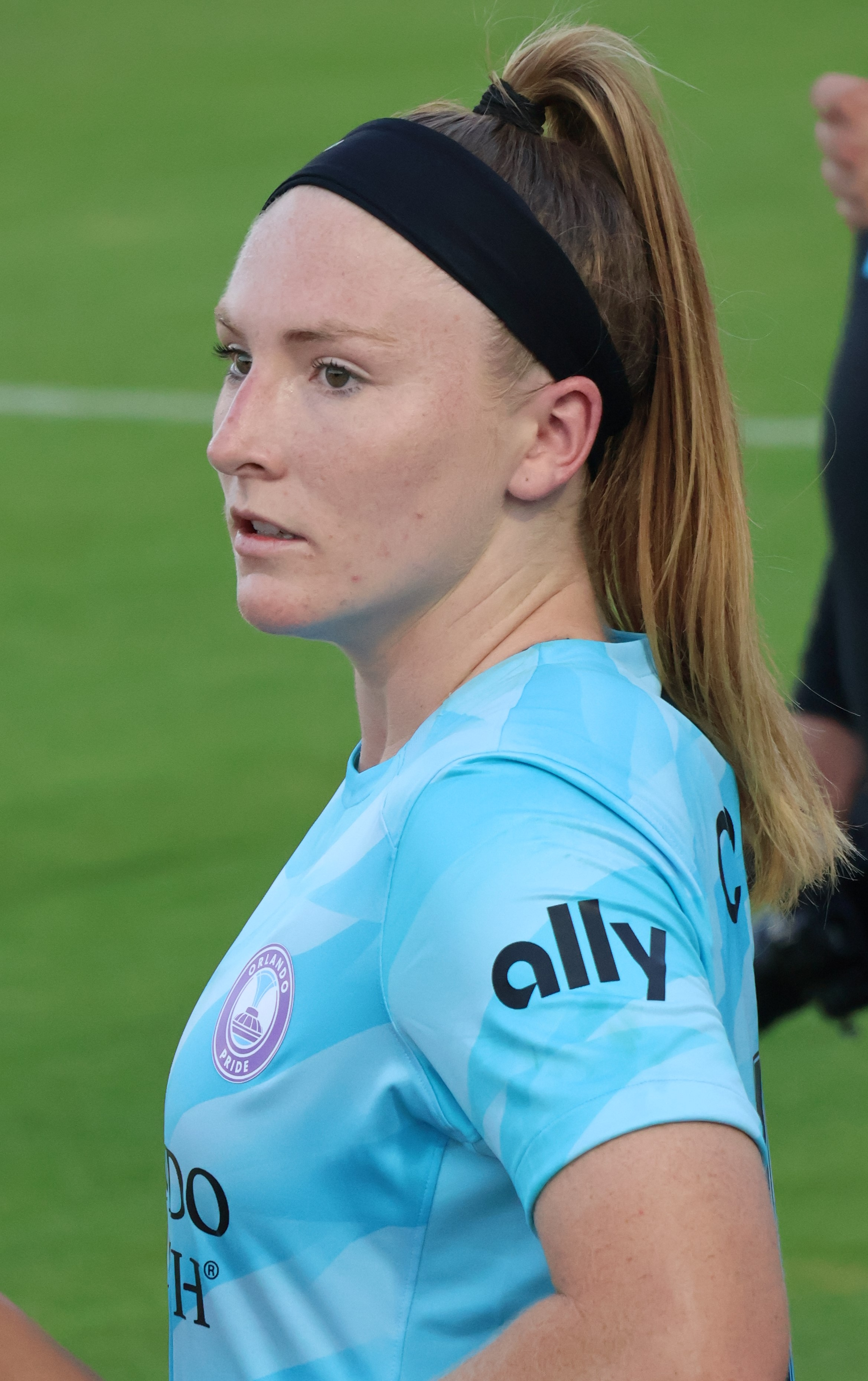
- Crone with the Orlando Pride in 2024

Personal information
- Full name: McKinley Allyn Crone
- Date of birth: October 20, 1998 (age 28)
- Place of birth: Maitland, Florida, United States
- Height: 5 ft 9 in (1.75 m)
- Position: Goalkeeper

Team information
- Current team: Orlando Pride
- Number: 40

College career
| Years | Team | Apps | (Gls) |
| 2017–2019 | Oklahoma Sooners | 41 | (0) |
| 2020–2022 | Alabama Crimson Tide | 66 | (0) |

Senior career*
| Years | Team | Apps | (Gls) |
| 2023– | Orlando Pride | 2 | (0) |
| 2026 | → Fort Lauderdale United (loan) | 4 | (0) |
- * Club domestic league appearances and goals as of February 22, 2026

McKinley Allyn Crone (born October 20, 1998) is an American professional soccer player who plays as a goalkeeper for the Orlando Pride of the National Women's Soccer League (NWSL). Born and raised in the Orlando area, she played college soccer for the Oklahoma Sooners and the Alabama Crimson Tide.

== Early life ==
Crone was born in the Orlando suburb of Maitland, Florida, to Mark and Lora Crone, and has a younger sister. She played multiple sports growing up before dedicating herself to soccer at age nine, though she also swam varsity in high school. She lettered in four years of soccer at Edgewater High School in Orlando, playing at forward as a freshman before staying in goal, and received all-metro honors three times. She played club soccer for Florida Kraze Krush.

== College career ==
Crone played two full seasons as the starting keeper for the Oklahoma Sooners. She piled up saves with 111 as a freshman in the 2017 season and 97 as a sophomore in 2018, though the team had losing records both years. She then suffered an injury and sought to play elsewhere, transferring to the Alabama Crimson Tide in 2020. In the 2021 season, she shut out Clemson in the first round of the NCAA championship, helping Alabama win its first ever match at the national tournament, and made a season-high seven saves in the loss to BYU in the next round.

In the 2022 regular season, Crone allowed only 11 goals in 19 games as Alabama went undefeated against Southeastern Conference (SEC) opponents and won the conference regular-season title for the first time in program history. They were beaten by South Carolina in the SEC tournament final but made it to the semifinals of the NCAA tournament for the first time, where Crone posted a season-high eight saves but allowed three, losing to eventual champions UCLA. She made 229 saves in three years at Alabama and tied the program record with 21 career clean sheets. She holds the all-time national record for career minutes played by a goalkeeper (9,519).

== Club career ==
Crone joined hometown club Orlando Pride as a non-roster trialist in the 2023 preseason. On September 13, she was signed to the roster for the rest of the season after having two spells on national team replacement contracts. She again trained with the Pride in the 2024 preseason, signing a one-year contract on March 11. On July 20, she made her professional debut with the start in a 1–1 draw against the North Carolina Courage in the NWSL x Liga MX Femenil Summer Cup, making five saves in regulation and stopping two penalties in the 5–4 shootout loss. On September 6, she signed a two-year extension to stay with the Pride through 2026.

On May 3, 2025, Crone made her NWSL regular-season debut in a 1–0 defeat to the Portland Thorns, replacing the injured Anna Moorhouse as a second-half substitute and not conceding in her 40 minutes in net.

On January 30, 2026, Crone joined Fort Lauderdale United on loan for the rest of the USL Super League season. She debuted for the club the following day, making several saves in a 3–1 loss to Lexington SC in the spring opener. She was recalled to her parent club on March 7, having made 4 appearances with 13 goals allowed.

== Career statistics ==
As of February 22, 2026

| Club | Season | League | | | Cup (Note: Includes NWSL Challenge Cup) | | Playoffs (Note: Includes NWSL playoffs) | | Other | | Total | |
| Club | Season | Division | Apps | Goals | Apps | Goals | Apps | Goals | Apps | Goals | Apps | Goals |
|---|---|---|---|---|---|---|---|---|---|---|---|---|
| Orlando Pride | 2023 | NWSL | 0 | 0 | 0 | 0 | — | | — | | 0 | 0 |
| Orlando Pride | 2024 | NWSL | 0 | 0 | — | | 0 | 0 | 1 (Note: Includes the 2024 NWSL x Liga MX Femenil Summer Cup) | 0 | 1 | 0 |
| Orlando Pride | 2025 | NWSL | 2 | 0 | 0 | 0 | — | | 1 | 0 | 3 | 0 |
| Fort Lauderdale United (loan) | 2026 | USLS | 4 | 0 | 0 | 0 | — | | — | | 4 | 0 |
| Career total | | | 5 | 0 | 0 | 0 | 0 | 0 | 2 | 0 | 8 | 0 |

== Honors and awards ==
Orlando Pride

- NWSL Shield: 2024
- NWSL Championship: 2024

Individual

- SEC all-tournament team: 2022
