= Carly Nelson =

American soccer player

Personal information
- Full name: Carly Marie Nelson
- Date of birth: February 11, 1998 (age 28)
- Place of birth: Lindon, Utah, U.S.
- Height: 5 ft 6 in (1.68 m)
- Position: Goalkeeper

Youth career
- Celtic Storm

College career
Years	Team	Apps	(Gls)
2016–2019	Utah Utes	63	(0)

Senior career*
Years	Team	Apps	(Gls)
2019	Utah Royals FC Reserves	1	(0)
2020	OL Reign	0	(0)
2021–2022	Kansas City Current	1	(0)
2021–2022	→ FC Nordsjælland (loan)	18	(0)
2022–2023	FC Nordsjælland	10	(0)
2023	Orlando Pride	3	(0)
2024	Utah Royals	1	(0)
- * Club domestic league appearances and goals as of March 7, 2025

Carly Marie Nelson (born February 11, 1998) is an American professional soccer player who most recently played as a goalkeeper for Utah Royals of the National Women's Soccer League (NWSL).

== Early life and college career ==
Born in Lindon, Utah, Nelson was a two-time First Team All-State goalkeeper as she helped Timpanogos High School reach the 4A state title game in three straight seasons. She was also named Team MVP twice. She played club soccer with Celtic Storm, winning the state title in five seasons

=== Utah Utes ===
Nelson played four seasons of college soccer at the University of Utah between 2016 and 2019 while studying for a bachelor's in positive psychology. As a freshman she made seven appearances, keeping three shutouts and conceding three goals. She made her first collegiate start in a 3–0 win over in-state rival Utah State on August 28, 2016. In 2018, she was twice named Pac-12 Conference goalkeeper of the week, led the conference in saves with 92 in total and ranked fourth in save percentage at 82.1%. In her final season, she made a career-high 105 saves, the most by a Ute in two decades and recorded Utah's longest shutout streak since the 2006 season after keeping four throughout September.

In summer of 2019, Nelson also played for Utah Royals FC's semi-professional reserve team in the Women's Premier Soccer League. She was rostered for nine games and made one appearance, 45 minutes in a 1–0 defeat to Utah Arrows.

== Club career ==
=== OL Reign ===
Nelson declared for the 2020 NWSL College Draft but was not selected. She was invited to preseason training camp with Utah Royals FC as a non-roster invitee but the league shut down two days in to camp due to the COVID-19 pandemic. In June 2020, Nelson signed a short-term contract with OL Reign, one of four non-roster invitees signed for the 2020 NWSL Challenge Cup, the NWSL's replacement competition for a return to play following the three-month stoppage. She was an unused substitute in all five games. She was also an unused substitute in two Fall Series games.

=== Kansas City Current ===
Nelson signed with the unbranded Kansas City NWSL expansion franchise on December 23, 2020. She made her senior club debut for the team on July 23, 2021, playing the full 90 minutes in a 0–0 draw with North Carolina Courage.

=== FC Nordsjælland ===
In August 2021, Nelson was loaned to Danish Kvindeliga club FC Nordsjælland. She made her debut for the club on September 25, in a 3–1 win against AGF. She made 18 league appearances, keeping seven shutouts and conceding 15 goals as Nordsjælland finished 4th. She also made three appearances in the Danish Women's Cup. In July 2022, she joined the club permanently.

=== Orlando Pride ===
On January 29, 2023, Nelson and Nordsjælland mutually agreed to terminate her contract so she could return to the United States, signing a two-year contract with Orlando Pride.

=== Utah Royals ===
On December 12, 2023, Orlando traded Nelson to hometown expansion franchise Utah Royals along with $65,000 in Allocation Money in exchange for an International Roster Spot for the 2024 season. Nelson started in the Royals' return game as a franchise, a defeat to the Chicago Red Stars on March 16, 2024. In May 2024, she took a mental health leave from soccer after not making any more appearances since the inaugural match. At the end of the season, Nelson was among the list of players not returning to Utah in 2025. It was later revealed that a large part of her exit was due to alleged abuse perpetrated by Royals coaches.

== Personal life ==
Nelson was raised in a Mormon community and speaks openly about her journey to freedom from the religion. She is openly gay and first came out at 13 to her best friend before being bullied at school as a result. With no support at home or school, Nelson felt isolated and attempted suicide. She is now an advocate for raising awareness to the struggles LGBTQ+ teens go through.

In January 2025, Nelson created a post on Instagram alleging "emotional and psychological abuse" at the hands of Utah Royals coaching staff. She claimed that a toxic environment was cultivated and that attempts to seek mental health support were met with retaliation and resistance by coaches. Nelson later took mental health leave and did not return to Utah after that season.

== Career statistics ==
=== College summary ===
Team	Season	Total		
Team	Season	Division	Apps	Goals
Utah Utes	2016	Div. I	7	0
Utah Utes	2017	Div. I	16	0
Utah Utes	2018	Div. I	19	0
Utah Utes	2019	Div. I	20	0
Total			63	0

=== Club summary ===
As of March 7, 2025

Club	Season	League			Cup (Note: Kvindepokalen and NWSL Challenge Cup)		Playoffs		Total	
Club	Season	Division	Apps	Goals	Apps	Goals	Apps	Goals	Apps	Goals
OL Reign	2020	NWSL	—		0	0	—		0	0
Kansas City Current	2021	NWSL	1	0	0	0	—		1	0
FC Nordsjælland (loan)	2021–22	Kvindeliga	18	0	3	0	—		21	0
FC Nordsjælland	2022–23	Kvindeliga	10	0	0	0	—		10	0
FC Nordsjælland	Total		28	0	3	0	0	0	31	0
Orlando Pride	2023	NWSL	3	0	1	0	—		4	0
Utah Royals	2024	NWSL	1	0	—		—		1	0
Career total			33	0	4	0	0	0	37	0
