= Maliah Morris =

American soccer player (born 2000)

Personal information
- Full name: Maliah Ashley Morris
- Date of birth: December 31, 2000 (age 25)
- Place of birth: Germantown, Maryland, U.S.
- Height: 5 ft 5 in (1.65 m)
- Position: Forward

Team information
- Current team: Racing Power
- Number: 2

Youth career
- Bethesda SC

College career
Years	Team	Apps	(Gls)
2019–2022	Clemson Tigers	68	(18)

Senior career*
Years	Team	Apps	(Gls)
2023	Orlando Pride	0	(0)
2023–2024	Western Sydney Wanderers	19	(1)
2024–	Racing Power	5	(0)
- * Club domestic league appearances and goals as of November 3, 2024

Maliah Ashley Morris (born December 31, 2000) is an American professional soccer player who plays as a forward for Portuguese Campeonato Nacional Feminino club Racing Power. Morris played college soccer for the Clemson Tigers. She is the sister of soccer player Makenna Morris.

== Early life ==
Morris was born in Germantown, Maryland. She started off playing soccer for Bethesda SC, where her mother was a coach. She eventually rose up the ranks at Bethesda and joined the club's ECNL squad in her later years. Morris attended St. John's College High School, where she helped the team to one WCAC championship and two DC State championships. In each of her years playing high school soccer, she was named the team's Offensive Player of the Year. She was also a two-time DC Gatorade Player of the Year.

== College career ==
Morris played five seasons for the Clemson Tigers. In her first year, she was named to the ACC All-Freshman Team. On August 25, 2019, she scored her first collegiate goal as Clemson recorded a 6–0 drubbing of Coastal Carolina. She was named Co-Offensive Player of the Week in September 2019. In March 2021, she was named the ACC Offensive Player of the Week after scoring twice and tallying an assist in a match against Georgia. One month later, Morris helped contribute to Clemson's Elite Eight run in the 2020 NCAA tournament. She scored a goal against Rutgers to kick off the Tigers' campaign before registering an assist in the following match versus UCLA. In her final season at Clemson, she was named to the All-ACC Third Team after scoring 3 goals and making 2 assists on the year. Morris finished her college career with 68 appearances and 18 goals under her belt.

== Club career ==
=== Orlando Pride ===
After departing from college, Morris registered her name for the 2023 NWSL Draft, but was ultimately not selected. Instead, she relocated to Florida and trained with the Orlando Pride as a non-roster invitee. On April 18, 2023, she signed her first professional contract with the Pride and joined the squad as an injury replacement player following Julie Doyle's placement on the 45-day injured list. Morris made her professional debut the very next day, coming on for Viviana Villacorta in Orlando's opening match of the 2023 NWSL Challenge Cup. She made two other Challenge Cup appearances before her short-term contract with the Pride expired.

=== Western Sydney Wanderers ===
On October 3, 2023, Morris signed with Australian club Western Sydney Wanderers. She debuted for the team in Western Sydney's season-opening rivalry defeat at the hands of Sydney FC. She scored her lone goal with the Wanderers on March 8, 2024, netting a stoppage-time goal that helped salvage a 1–1 draw with Canberra United. At the end of the 2023–24 season, Western Sydney announced Morris' departure from the club.

=== Racing Power ===
Morris signed with Portuguese club Racing Power FC on September 14, 2024.

== International career ==
Morris received her first call-up to the United States U18 squad in 2017. The following year, she was a member of the La Manga 12 Nations Tournament squad that traveled to Spain and played in 3 matches to start 2018.

== Personal life ==
Morris' sister, Makenna, plays soccer professionally for Racing Louisville FC. The siblings played together on Bethesda SC's ECNL squad and with the Clemson Tigers. Their mother is also a former player.

== Career statistics ==
=== Club ===
As of March 29, 2024

Appearances and goals by club, season and competition
Club	Season	League			Cup (Note: Includes the NWSL Challenge Cup)		Playoffs		Total	
Club	Season	Division	Apps	Goals	Apps	Goals	Apps	Goals	Apps	Goals
Orlando Pride	2023	NWSL	0	0	3	0	—		3	0
Western Sydney Wanderers	2023–24	A-League	19	1	—		—		19	1
Career total			19	1	3	0	0	0	22	1
