= Brianna Martinez =

American soccer player (born 2000)

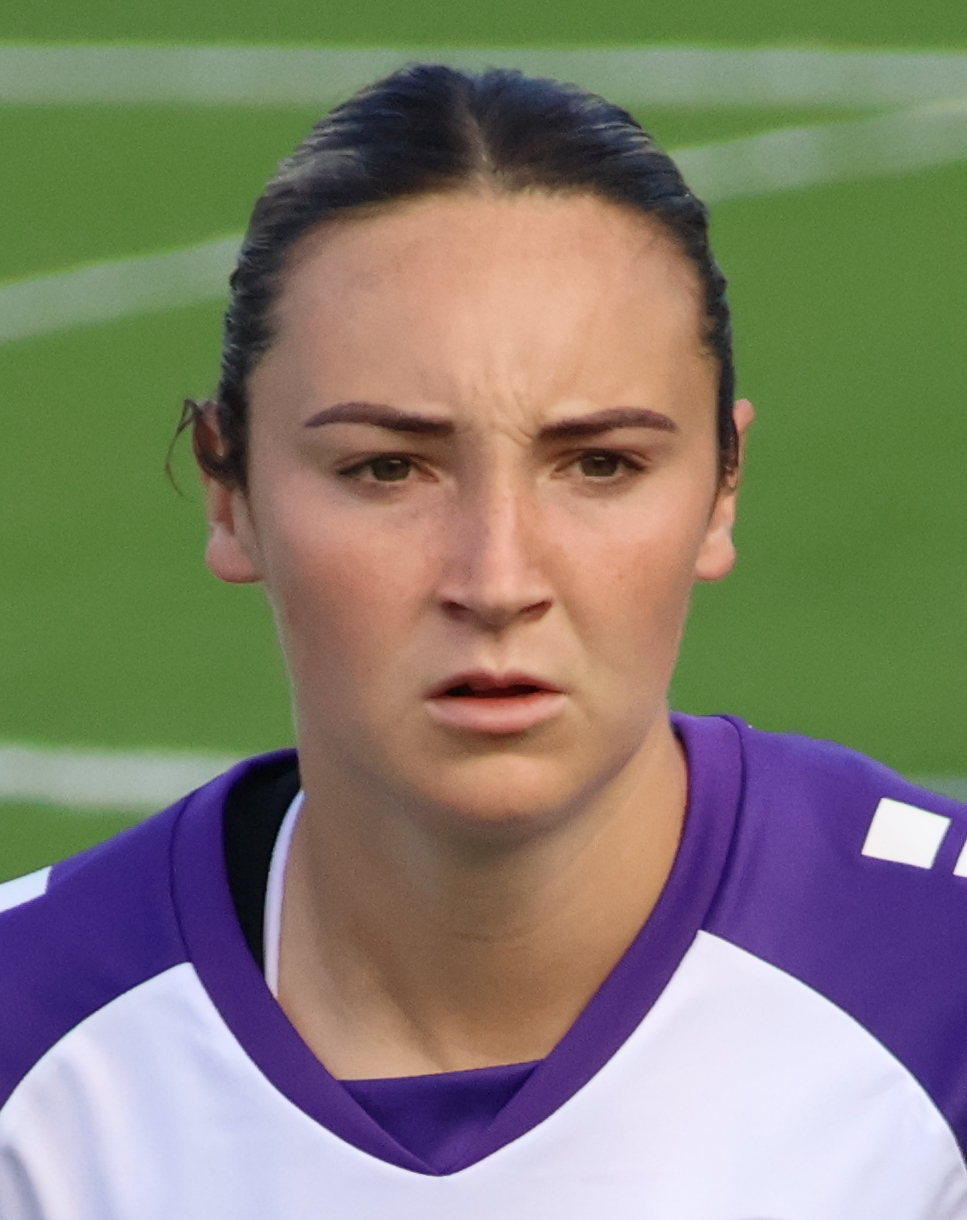
- Martinez with the Carolina Ascent in 2025

Personal information
- Full name: Brianna Cathleen Martinez
- Date of birth: April 22, 2000 (age 26)
- Place of birth: Albuquerque, New Mexico, United States
- Height: 5 ft 6 in (1.68 m)
- Position: Right back

Youth career
- New Mexico Rush

College career
| Years | Team | Apps | (Gls) |
| 2018–2022 | Notre Dame Fighting Irish | 91 | (2) |

Senior career*
| Years | Team | Apps | (Gls) |
| 2023–2025 | Orlando Pride | 22 | (0) |
| 2025 | → Carolina Ascent (loan) | 12 | (1) |
| 2026 | Carolina Ascent | 11 | (0) |
| Total | | 45 | (1) |

International career
| 2015–2016 | United States U-16 | | |
| 2017–2018 | United States U-18 | | |
| 2017 | United States U-19 | 2 | (0) |
| 2018–2020 | United States U-20 | 7 | (0) |
- * Club domestic league appearances and goals

Brianna Cathleen Martinez (born April 22, 2000) is an American former professional soccer player who played as a right back for the Orlando Pride of the National Women's Soccer League (NWSL) and Carolina Ascent FC of the USL Super League. She played college soccer for the Notre Dame Fighting Irish. She was drafted by Racing Louisville FC in the second round of the 2023 NWSL Draft, but instead signed with the Pride and won the NWSL Shield and NWSL Championship in her second season in 2024. She represented the United States at multiple youth international levels, winning the 2020 CONCACAF Women's U-20 Championship.

== Early life ==
Martinez was born in Albuquerque, New Mexico. She played club soccer for New Mexico Rush and was ranked as one of the top prospects of the class of 2019. She played four years of high school soccer at Volcano Vista High School.

== College career ==
Martinez was a five-year starter for the Notre Dame Fighting Irish, making 91 appearances from 2018 to 2022. She captained the team during her last two years and scored her only two college goals in her senior year in 2021. In 2022, she helped lead the Fighting Irish to the quarterfinals of the NCAA championship. She was placed in the final spot for postseason penalty shoot-outs in her last two seasons and converted kicks to defeat Purdue in the 2021 NCAA second round and Pittsburgh in the 2022 ACC first round.

== Club career ==
=== Orlando Pride ===
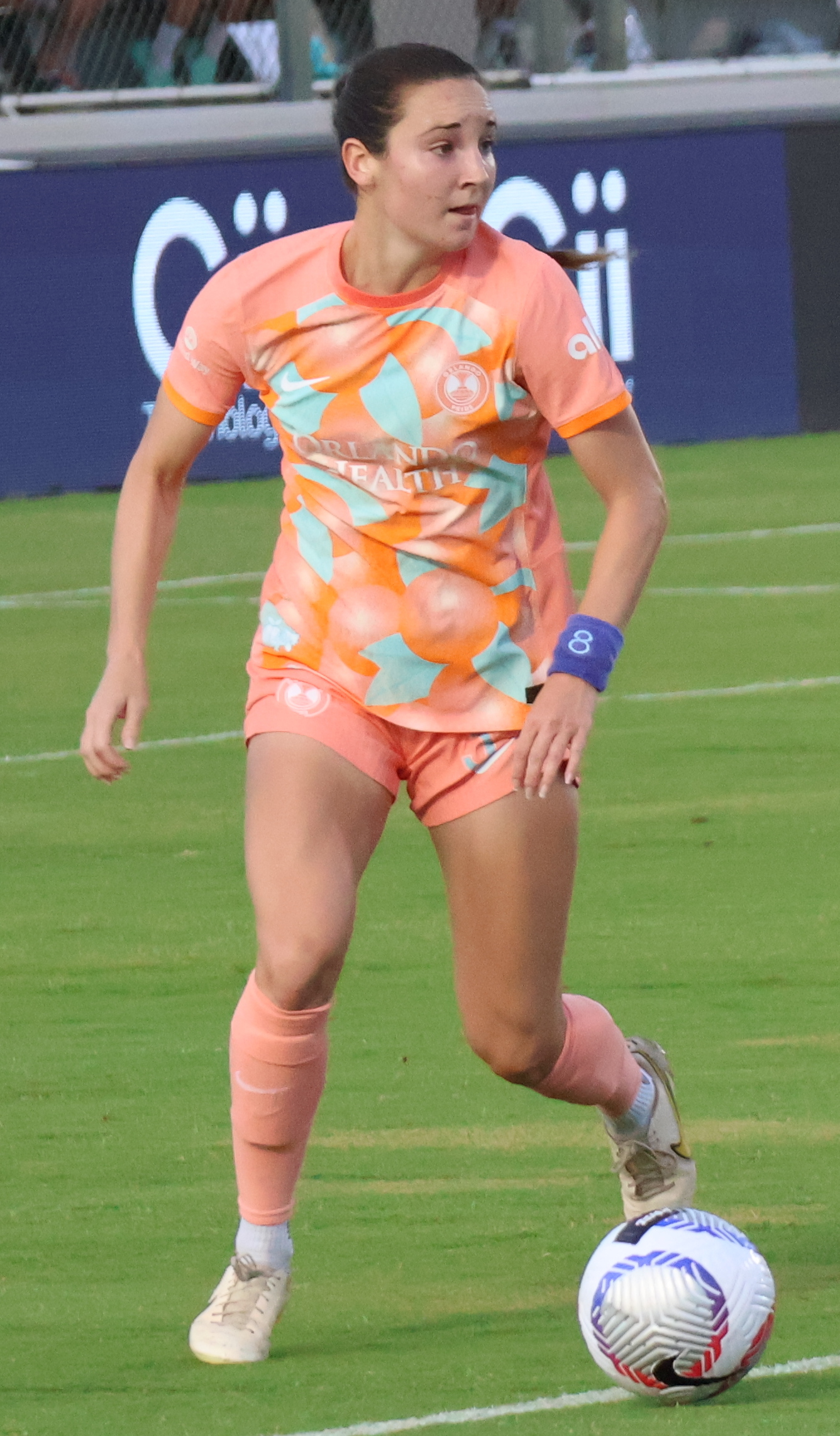
Martinez playing for the Orlando Pride in 2024

Martinez was drafted 17th overall by Racing Louisville FC in the 2023 NWSL Draft but did not sign with the club. She was invited to train with the Orlando Pride as a non-rostered player in the 2023 preseason and agreed to a one-year contract with the option for an additional year. She made her professional debut on April 23, coming on as an 84th-minute substitute for Haley McCutcheon in a 2–0 loss to the Kansas City Current. She made her first start on May 10, playing the full 4–2 loss to the Washington Spirit in the NWSL Challenge Cup. During her rookie season, she made eight regular-season appearances and played in four games (with three starts) in the Challenge Cup. After the season, the Pride exercised her player option.

Martinez made her first regular-season start on March 22, 2024, playing the full 1–1 draw at center back against Angel City FC. She became a regular starter at right back in the early part of the season, except when center back Rafaelle was healthy and pushed Emily Sams to Martinez's position. On June 25, her contract was extended to the end of 2025. On July 21, she suffered a non-contact injury to her left leg during a game against the North Carolina Courage in the NWSL x Liga MX Femenil Summer Cup. After the injury, she did not play for the remainder of the season but appeared on the bench for several games. Orlando was undefeated during her 13 regular-season games that season, including 8 starts. The Pride went on to win its first titles in club history, lifting both the NWSL Shield and NWSL Championship trophies.

=== Carolina Ascent ===
On July 2, 2025, it was announced that Martinez would join USL Super League club Carolina Ascent on loan for the rest of the year. She made her debut on August 30 and played the entire match in the Ascent's season-opening 2–2 draw with Fort Lauderdale United. On October 18, she scored her first professional goal in a 2–1 win over Brooklyn FC, the Ascent's first road win of the season. After her Orlando contract expired in December, the Ascent made the loan permanent. She finished the season with 23 appearances, including 16 starts, as Carolina placed third in the league. Her final appearance came in extra time of the league final as the Ascent lost 3–1 to Lexington SC. On June 2, 2026, she announced her retirement from professional soccer.

== International career ==
Martinez was called into training camps with the United States under-16 and under-17 national teams in 2015 and 2016 was recognized among the Best XI of an under-16 international friendly tournament. She played friendlies for the under-18 and under-19 teams in 2017. She stayed with the under-18s the following year before being called up to the under-20 team. While in college, she was selected to the roster for the 2020 CONCACAF Women's U-20 Championship, which the United States won. She was called up to play friendlies with the under-23 team against NWSL clubs in the 2022 preseason.

== Career statistics ==
| Club | Season | League | | | Playoffs | | Cup (Note: Includes NWSL Challenge Cup) | | Other | | Total | |
| Club | Season | Division | Apps | Goals | Apps | Goals | Apps | Goals | Apps | Goals | Apps | Goals |
|---|---|---|---|---|---|---|---|---|---|---|---|---|
| Orlando Pride | 2023 | NWSL | 8 | 0 | — | | 4 | 0 | — | | 12 | 0 |
| Orlando Pride | 2024 | NWSL | 13 | 0 | 0 | 0 | — | | 1 (Note: Includes the NWSL x Liga MX Femenil Summer Cup) | 0 | 14 | 0 |
| Orlando Pride | 2025 | NWSL | 1 | 0 | — | | 0 | 0 | — | | 0 | 0 |
| Carolina Ascent | 2025–26 | USLS | 23 | 1 | 1 | 0 | — | | — | | 24 | 1 |
| Career total | | | 45 | 1 | 1 | 0 | 4 | 0 | 1 | 0 | 51 | 1 |

== Honors ==
Orlando Pride

- NWSL Shield: 2024
- NWSL Championship: 2024
