= Channing Foster =

American soccer player (born 1998)

Personal information
- Full name: Channing Taylor Foster
- Date of birth: December 25, 1998 (age 27)
- Place of birth: Murray, Kentucky, U.S.
- Height: 5 ft 6 in (1.68 m)
- Positions: Midfielder; forward

College career
Years	Team	Apps	(Gls)
2017–2021	Ole Miss Rebels	100	(44)

Senior career*
Years	Team	Apps	(Gls)
2022	Chicago Red Stars	1	(0)
2023	SK Slavia Prague	1	(1)

International career
2019	United States U23		
- * Club domestic league appearances and goals

Channing Taylor Foster (born December 25, 1998) is an American former professional soccer player who played as a midfielder.

== Early life ==
Foster grew up in Murray, Kentucky and played for Graves County High School.

== College career ==
Foster played college soccer at Ole Miss from 2017 to 2021.

In 2017, she recorded hat-tricks against Northwestern State on August 20, and against Southern Miss on September 3. She was named to the All-SEC Second Team and SEC All-Freshman Team. She was again named Second Team All-SEC in 2018, and was named First Team All-SEC in 2019, 2020, and 2021.

Foster was named to the All-SEC teams in each of her five years of college soccer, becoming the first five-time honoree in league history.

Foster majored in Accountancy in college.

== Club career ==
Foster was drafted by the NWSL's Chicago Red Stars in the 2021 NWSL Draft.

In February 2022, she was announced on Chicago's preseason roster. She made her NWSL Challenge Cup debut during a March 20 match against Houston Dash, and made her NWSL regular season debut during a July 2 match against NJ/NY Gotham FC. Foster was waived by Chicago Red Stars in November 2022.

In February 2023, she was a preseason trialist with Orlando Pride.

Foster signed with SK Slavia Prague in March 2023. She scored a goal on her Slavia Prague league debut, in a 10–0 win against FC Baník Ostrava in March 2023.

== International career ==
Foster represented the United States under-23 team at the 2019 Thorns Spring Invitational.

== Personal life ==
In August 2021, Foster signed a name, image, and likeness deal with Walk-On's Sports Bistreaux.

Foster married Will Allen in December 2022.

== Career statistics ==
Appearances and goals by club, season and competition
Club	Season	League			Cup (Note: Includes the NWSL Challenge Cup and Czech Women's Cup)		Playoffs (Note: Includes NWSL Playoffs and Czech Women's First League Championship group)		Total	
Club	Season	Division	Apps	Goals	Apps	Goals	Apps	Goals	Apps	Goals
Chicago Red Stars	2022	NWSL	1	0	1	0	0	0	2	0
SK Slavia Prague	2022–23	First League	1	1	2	1	5	0	8	2
Career total			2	1	3	1	5	0	10	2
