= 2022 Orlando Pride season =

Orlando Pride
2022 season
- Head coach: Amanda Cromwell (suspended from June 7); Seb Hines (interim, from June 7)
- Stadium: Exploria Stadium; Orlando, Florida
- NWSL: 10th of 12
- Playoffs: Did not qualify
- Challenge Cup: 4th (East division)
- Top goalscorer: League: Meggie Dougherty Howard (3); All: Darian Jenkins and Gunnhildur Jónsdóttir (4)
- Highest home attendance: 7,573 (July 3 vs. Racing Louisville at Daytona International Speedway)
- Lowest home attendance: 3,015 (May 22 vs. Chicago Red Stars)
- Average home league attendance: 4,385
| Home colors | Away colors |

The 2022 Orlando Pride season was Orlando Pride's seventh season in the National Women's Soccer League, the top division of women's soccer in the United States.

== Notable events ==
Following the departure of interim head coach Becky Burleigh at the end of the previous season, Orlando announced the appointment of Amanda Cromwell as the team's permanent head coach on December 7, 2021. Four days earlier she had stood down as head coach of UCLA Bruins women's soccer after nine seasons in charge. Cromwell also had to divest her investment stake in 2022 expansion side Angel City FC in order to take the job. Sam Greene, Cromwell's assistant at UCLA, joined her to become first assistant coach while Cromwell's former international teammate Michelle Akers was hired as an assistant and player development coach. Seb Hines was retained from the previous coaching staff.

On December 13, 2021, the United States Soccer Federation announced the end of the allocation system ahead of the 2022 season. At the time Orlando had already traded away Ali Krieger and Ashlyn Harris, and had a deal made in principle to trade away Alex Morgan meaning Canadian goalkeeper Erin McLeod was the only federated player under contract with the Pride.

On December 16, 2021, with the addition of Angel City FC and San Diego Wave FC ahead of the 2022 NWSL season, the NWSL held the 2022 NWSL Expansion Draft. Angel City selected the playing rights of Claire Emslie off Orlando's unprotected list. Emslie had transferred out of the NWSL to English FA WSL team Everton in December 2020. San Diego did not select anyone from Orlando although the trade sending Alex Morgan to San Diego was officially announced immediately after the draft suggesting draft protection had already been agreed as part of the trade. The following day, Orlando traded Brittany Wilson and a third-round 2023 NWSL Draft pick to Angel City in exchange for a fourth-round 2023 NWSL Draft pick. General manager Ian Fleming's comments in the trade press release confirmed expansion draft protection for players currently on the Pride roster had been agreed as part of the deal.

On June 7, it was announced head coach Amanda Cromwell and assistant coach Sam Greene had been placed on administrative leave on the recommendation of the NWSL and NWSL Players Association joint investigation team following alleged "retaliation in violation of the NWSL Policy to Prevent and Eliminate Workplace Discrimination, Harassment, and Bullying." Seb Hines was promoted to interim head coach.

== Roster ==
As of September 8, 2022

| No. | Nationality | Name | Position(s) | Date of birth (age) | Previous club | Notes |
Goalkeepers
| 1 | (Canada) | Erin McLeod | GK | February 26, 1983 (aged 39) | (Sweden) Växjö DFF | – |
| 18 | (United States) | Kaylie Collins | GK | May 17, 1998 (aged 23) | (United States) USC Trojans | SUP |
| 21 | (England) | Anna Moorhouse | GK | March 30, 1995 (aged 26) | (France) Bordeaux | INT |
| 40 | (United States) | Kelly Rowswell | GK | January 28, 1998 (aged 24) | (France) Issy | GKR |
Defenders
| 2 | (United States) | Haley Hanson | DF | February 22, 1996 (aged 26) | (United States) Houston Dash | – |
| 3 | (United States) | Toni Pressley | DF | February 19, 1990 (aged 32) | (United States) Houston Dash | – |
| 5 | (United States) | Megan Montefusco | DF | September 3, 1992 (aged 29) | (United States) Houston Dash | – |
| 12 | (United States) | Carrie Lawrence | DF | July 15, 1997 (aged 24) | (United States) UCF Knights | SUP |
| 13 | (Spain) | Celia | DF | June 20, 1995 (aged 26) | (United States) OL Reign | – |
| 17 | (United States) | Courtney Petersen | DF | October 28, 1997 (aged 24) | (United States) Virginia Cavaliers | – |
| 23 | (United States) | Kylie Strom | DF | March 18, 1992 (aged 30) | (Spain) Atlético Madrid | – |
| 25 | (United States) | Kerry Abello | DF | September 17, 1999 (aged 22) | (United States) Penn State Nittany Lions | SUP |
| 26 | (United States) | Caitlin Cosme | DF | January 19, 1999 (aged 23) | (United States) Duke Blue Devils | – |
Midfielders
| 8 | (Iceland) | Gunnhildur Jónsdóttir | MF | September 28, 1988 (aged 33) | (United States) Kansas City NWSL | – |
| 14 | (United States) | Viviana Villacorta | MF | February 2, 1999 (aged 23) | (United States) UCLA Bruins | – |
| 15 | (United States) | Erika Tymrak | MF | August 7, 1991 (aged 30) | (United States) Utah Royals | – |
| 16 | (United States) | Mikayla Cluff | MF | February 25, 1999 (aged 23) | (United States) BYU Cougars | – |
| 22 | (United States) | Parker Roberts | MF | July 30, 1997 (aged 24) | (United States) Florida Gators | SUP |
| 27 | (United States) | Chelsee Washington | MF | November 17, 1997 (aged 24) | (United States) Bowling Green Falcons | – |
| 28 | (United States) | Meggie Dougherty Howard | MF | July 27, 1995 (aged 26) | (United States) Washington Spirit | – |
| 30 | (Brazil) | Thais Reiss | MF | December 9, 1999 (aged 22) | (United States) North Florida Ospreys | INT |
| 34 | (Canada) | Jordyn Listro | MF | August 10, 1995 (aged 26) | (United States) North Carolina Courage | |
Forwards
| 7 | (Malta) | Haley Bugeja | FW | May 5, 2004 (aged 17) | (Italy) Sassuolo | INT |
| 10 | (Brazil) | Marta | FW | February 19, 1986 (aged 36) | (Sweden) FC Rosengård | |
| 11 | (United States) | Darian Jenkins | FW | January 5, 1995 (aged 27) | (United States) Kansas City Current | – |
| 20 | (United States) | Julie Doyle | FW | August 30, 1998 (aged 23) | (United States) Santa Clara Broncos | – |
| 33 | (United States) | Ally Watt | FW | March 12, 1997 (aged 25) | (United States) OL Reign | – |
| 35 | (United States) | Leah Pruitt | FW | September 5, 1997 (aged 24) | (United States) OL Reign | – |

== Staff ==
As of August 15, 2022.

Executive
| Majority owner and chairman | (United States) Mark Wilf |
| Majority owner and vice-chair | (United States) Zygi Wilf |
| Majority owner and vice-chair | (United States) Leonard Wilf |
| President of business operations | (United States) Jarrod Dillon |
| General manager | (United States) Ian Fleming |
Coaching staff
| Interim head coach | (England) Seb Hines |
| Head coach | (United States) Amanda Cromwell (suspended) |
| Assistant coach | (United States) Sam Greene (suspended) |
| Coach | (United States) Michelle Akers |
| Goalkeeper coach | (Brazil) Aline Villares Reis |

== Match results ==
=== Friendlies ===
As per the league schedule, NWSL teams are permitted to begin a six-week preseason camp on February 1.

| February 18 | Orlando Pride | 1–1 | UCF Knights | Sanford, Florida |
| 2:30 pm | Leroux 25' (pen.) | | 59' | Stadium: Sylvan Lake Park |
Note: Closed-door scrimmage

| February 25 | South Florida Bulls | 0–4 | Orlando Pride | Tampa, Florida |
| 6:00 pm | | | Jenkins 3', 50'; Reiss 34'; Tymrak 60' | Stadium: Corbett Stadium |
Note: Closed-door scrimmage

| March 2 | Orlando Pride | 0–0 | Kansas City Current | Orlando, Florida |
| 7:00 pm | | Report | | Stadium: Exploria Stadium |

| March 5 | Orlando Pride | 0–2 | Florida State Seminoles | Sanford, Florida |
| 1:00 pm | | | 22'; 52' | Stadium: Sylvan Lake Park |
Note: Closed-door scrimmage

| March 12 | Orlando Pride | – | Flagler Saints | Sanford, Florida |
| | | | | Stadium: Sylvan Lake Park |
Note: Closed-door scrimmage. No scoreline announced.

=== National Women's Soccer League ===
For the third time in league history and the first time since 2014, the NWSL regular season will be played on a balanced schedule i.e. each team will play every other team twice; once at home and once away. The top six teams will qualify for the playoffs with the top two receiving a first-round bye.

==== Results summary ====
| Overall | | | | | | | | Home | | | | | | Away | | | | | |
| Pld | W | D | L | GF | GA | GD | Pts | W | D | L | GF | GA | GD | W | D | L | GF | GA | GD |
|---|---|---|---|---|---|---|---|---|---|---|---|---|---|---|---|---|---|---|---|
| 22 | 5 | 7 | 10 | 22 | 45 | −23 | 22 | 1 | 5 | 5 | 14 | 24 | −10 | 4 | 2 | 5 | 8 | 21 | −13 |

Last updated: October 1, 2022.
Source: NWSLsoccer.com

==== Results by round ====
| Round | 1 | 2 | 3 | 4 | 5 | 6 | 7 | 8 | 9 | 10 | 11 | 12 | 13 | 14 | 15 | 16 | 17 | 18 | 19 | 20 | 21 | 22 |
|---|---|---|---|---|---|---|---|---|---|---|---|---|---|---|---|---|---|---|---|---|---|---|
| Stadium | H | A | H | A | H | H | A | A | A | H | H | A | A | H | A | A | H | H | A | H | H | A |
| Result | L | W | D | W | L | D | L | L | L | D | W | D | D | D | W | W | L | L | L | L | D | L |
| Position (Note: ORL's position at the end of the matchweek, not their match.) | 11 | 8 | 5 | 2 | 5 | 6 | 9 | 11 | 11 | 11 | 9 | 8 | 8 | 8 | 8 | 8 | 8 | 9 | 9 | 9 | 9 | 10 |

Updated to match(es) played on October 1, 2022. Source: NWSLsoccer.com
A = Away; H = Home; W = Win; D = Draw; L = Loss

==== Results ====
| May 1 1 | Orlando Pride | 0–3 | Gotham FC | Orlando, Florida |
| 7:00 pm | Montefusco (yellow card) 53' | Report | Zerboni 29', (yellow card) 78'; Purce 30'; Mewis 41' | Stadium: Exploria Stadium; Attendance: 4,304; Referee: Natalie Simon |

| May 8 2 | Angel City FC | 0–1 | Orlando Pride | Los Angeles, California |
| 8:00 pm | Reid (yellow card) 25' | Report | Leroux 3', (yellow card) 68'; Montefusco (yellow card) 33'; Abello (yellow card) 89' | Stadium: Banc of California Stadium; Attendance: 17,510; Referee: Adorae Monroy |

| May 14 3 | Orlando Pride | 2–2 | Kansas City Current | Orlando, Florida |
| 6:30 pm | Pruitt (yellow card) 45+2'; Jónsdóttir 51'; Strom (yellow card) 56'; Cluff (yellow card) 74'; Pressley 90+6' (pen.) | Report | Loera (yellow card) 32'; Bennett 78'; Hamilton 90+1'; Scott (yellow card) 90+4'; Ball (yellow card) 90+7' | Stadium: Exploria Stadium; Attendance: 3,511; Referee: Alexandra Billeter |

| May 18 4 | North Carolina Courage | 1–2 | Orlando Pride | Cary, North Carolina |
| 7:00 pm | Pinto 86' | Report | Leroux 4'; Cluff 44'; Jenkins (yellow card) 73' | Stadium: Sahlen's Stadium; Attendance: 3,084; Referee: Mark Allatin |

| May 22 5 | Orlando Pride | 2–4 | Chicago Red Stars | Orlando, Florida |
| 7:00 pm | Turner (yellow card) 70', (goal) 83'; Listro (yellow card) 76'; Pruitt 87' | Report | Griffith 11'; St-Georges 54'; Pugh 64', 86'; Morse (yellow card) 84'; Milazzo (yellow card) 90'; Kowalski (yellow card) 90+3' | Stadium: Exploria Stadium; Attendance: 3,015; Referee: Danielle Chesky |

| May 27 6 | Orlando Pride | 2–2 | Washington Spirit | Orlando, Florida |
| 7:00 pm | Montefusco (yellow card) 77'; Cluff 90+5'; Jenkins 90+8' | Report | Rodman 19', (yellow card) 81'; Feist (yellow card) 22'; Sanchez (yellow card) 42'; Hatch 66', (yellow card) 75'; Brooks (yellow card) 90' | Stadium: Exploria Stadium; Attendance: 3,586; Referee: Matt Thompson |

| June 3 7 | Houston Dash | 5–0 | Orlando Pride | Houston, Texas |
| 8:30 pm | Prince 27', 39', 49'; Daly 32'; Campbell (yellow card) 63'; Alozie 87' | Report | | Stadium: PNC Stadium; Attendance: 6,073; Referee: Luis Guardia |

| June 12 8 | Chicago Red Stars | 1–0 | Orlando Pride | Bridgeview, Illinois |
| 6:00 pm | Pugh 10'; Nagasato (yellow card) 49'; Colaprico (yellow card) 62' | Report | Pressley (yellow card) 56' | Stadium: SeatGeek Stadium; Attendance: 3,881; Referee: Alyssa Nichols |

| June 19 9 | Portland Thorns | 6–0 | Orlando Pride | Portland, Oregon |
| 3:00 pm | Sugita 21'; Sauerbrunn 25'; Pogarch (yellow card) 32'; S. Smith 63', 86'; Kuikka 79'; Porter 90+1' | Report | Pressley (yellow card) 88'; Listro (yellow card) 90+2' | Stadium: Providence Park; Attendance: 16,185; Referee: Samantha Martinez |

| July 3 10 | Orlando Pride | 2–2 | Racing Louisville | Daytona Beach, Florida |
| 8:00 pm | Celia (yellow card) 45'; Dougherty Howard (yellow card) 47'; Montefusco (yellow card) 50'; Strom 59'; Jenkins 69'; Tymrak (yellow card) 77' | Report | Olofsson (yellow card) 16'; Ekic 34'; DeMelo 51'; Martin (yellow card) 61' | Stadium: Daytona International Speedway; Attendance: 7,573; Referee: Alexandra Billeter |
Note: Part of the inaugural Daytona Soccer Fest

| July 8 11 | Orlando Pride | 1–0 | Houston Dash | Orlando, Florida |
| 7:00 pm | Prisock 79' (o.g.); Washington (yellow card) 90+1' | Report | Viggiano (yellow card) 88' | Stadium: Exploria Stadium; Attendance: 3,520; Referee: Natalie Simon |

| July 17 12 | Washington Spirit | 0–0 | Orlando Pride | Buzzard Point, Washington D.C. |
| 5:00 pm | Aylmer (yellow card) 45+4' | Report | | Stadium: Audi Field; Attendance: 7,795; Referee: Alyssa Nichols |

| July 31 13 | Kansas City Current | 2–2 | Orlando Pride | Kansas City, Kansas |
| 7:00 pm | Bennett 57'; Mace (yellow card) 64'; Scott (yellow card) 68'; Kizer 82'; Pickett (yellow card) 83' | Report | Celia 25'; Dougherty Howard (yellow card) 38'; Listro (yellow card) 39'; Doyle 46'; Montefusco (yellow card) 66' | Stadium: Children's Mercy Park; Attendance: 7,192; Referee: Greg Dopka |

| August 7 14 | Orlando Pride | 2–2 | Angel City FC | Orlando, Florida |
| 7:00 pm | Pressley (yellow card) 57'; Tymrak (yellow card) 58'; Doyle 64'; Nielsen 90+1' (o.g.); Cluff (yellow card) 90+6' | Report | Riley 40'; Roccaro 72', (yellow card) 76' | Stadium: Exploria Stadium; Attendance: 4,904; Referee: Matt Thompson |

| August 13 15 | San Diego Wave | 0–1 | Orlando Pride | San Diego, California |
| 5:00 pm | Sheridan (red card) FT | Report | Dougherty Howard 23' (pen.); McLeod (yellow card) 90+2' | Stadium: Torero Stadium; Attendance: 4,418; Referee: Adorae Monroy |

| August 20 16 | Gotham FC | 1–2 | Orlando Pride | Chester, Pennsylvania |
| 7:00 pm | Dorsey (yellow card) 42'; Mewis 75' | Report | Listro (yellow card) 6'; Celia 49'; Watt 73' | Stadium: Subaru Park; Attendance: 4,107; Referee: Katja Koroleva |

| August 26 17 | Orlando Pride | 1–2 | OL Reign | Orlando, Florida |
| 7:00 pm | Dougherty Howard 37'; Strom (yellow card) 38'; Abello (yellow card) 65' | Report | Balcer 56'; Lavelle (yellow card) 64'; Rapinoe 90+2', (yellow card) 90+3' | Stadium: Exploria Stadium; Attendance: 4,588; Referee: Elvis Osmanovic |
Note: Kickoff delayed by 37 minutes due to inclement weather.

| September 9 18 | Orlando Pride | 0–2 | Portland Thorns | Orlando, Florida |
| 7:00 pm | Montefusco (yellow card) 22'; Reiss (yellow card) 72' | Report | Ryan 31', (yellow card) 34'; Kuikka (yellow card) 54'; Sugita 65'; Weaver (yellow card) 90'; Klingenberg (yellow card) 90+5' | Stadium: Exploria Stadium; Attendance: 3,515; Referee: Thomas Snyder |

| September 16 19 | Racing Louisville | 2–0 | Orlando Pride | Louisville, Kentucky |
| 7:30 pm | Nadim 10'; DeMelo 50'; Lund (yellow card) 82' | Report | | Stadium: Lynn Family Stadium; Attendance: 5,397; Referee: Anya Voigt |

| September 21 20 | Orlando Pride | 0–3 | North Carolina Courage | Orlando, Florida |
| 7:00 pm | | Report | Debinha 2', 53'; Boade 45+1'; Madsen (yellow card) 57' | Stadium: Exploria Stadium; Attendance: 3,258; Referee: Adorae Monroy |

| September 25 21 | Orlando Pride | 2–2 | San Diego Wave | Orlando, Florida |
| 7:00 pm | Dougherty Howard 33'; Jónsdóttir 68' | Report | Taylor (yellow card) 44'; Doniak 76'; Kornieck (yellow card) 77', (goal) 87' | Stadium: Exploria Stadium; Attendance: 6,466; Referee: Matt Thompson |

| October 1 22 | OL Reign | 3–0 | Orlando Pride | Seattle, Washington |
| 10:00 pm | Rapinoe 8'; Huitema 24'; Balcer 31', (yellow card) 47' | Report | Montefusco (yellow card) 29'; Hanson (yellow card) 56'; Petersen (yellow card) 69'; Dougherty Howard (yellow card) 90' | Stadium: Lumen Field; Attendance: 10,746; Referee: Ekaterina Koroleva |

League standings

| Pos | Team | Pld | W | D | L | GF | GA | GD | Pts | Qualification |
|---|---|---|---|---|---|---|---|---|---|---|
| 1 | OL Reign | 22 | 11 | 7 | 4 | 32 | 19 | +13 | 40 | NWSL Shield, Playoffs – semi-finals |
| 2 | Portland Thorns FC (C) | 22 | 10 | 9 | 3 | 49 | 24 | +25 | 39 | Playoffs – semi-finals |
| 3 | San Diego Wave FC | 22 | 10 | 6 | 6 | 32 | 21 | +11 | 36 | Playoffs – first round |
| 4 | Houston Dash | 22 | 10 | 6 | 6 | 35 | 27 | +8 | 36 | Playoffs – first round |
| 5 | Kansas City Current | 22 | 10 | 6 | 6 | 29 | 29 | 0 | 36 | Playoffs – first round |
| 6 | Chicago Red Stars | 22 | 9 | 6 | 7 | 34 | 28 | +6 | 33 | Playoffs – first round |
| 7 | North Carolina Courage | 22 | 9 | 5 | 8 | 46 | 33 | +13 | 32 | |
| 8 | Angel City FC | 22 | 8 | 5 | 9 | 23 | 27 | −4 | 29 | |
| 9 | Racing Louisville FC | 22 | 5 | 8 | 9 | 23 | 35 | −12 | 23 | |
| 10 | Orlando Pride | 22 | 5 | 7 | 10 | 22 | 45 | −23 | 22 | |
| 11 | Washington Spirit | 22 | 3 | 10 | 9 | 26 | 33 | −7 | 19 | |
| 12 | NJ/NY Gotham FC | 22 | 4 | 1 | 17 | 16 | 46 | −30 | 13 | |

Source: NWSL
Rules for classification: Tiebreakers
(C) Champions

=== NWSL Challenge Cup ===
The 2022 NWSL Challenge Cup took place between March 19 and May 7. With the format split into three groups of four teams, each team played a six-game round robin home and away series with the top team from each group progressing to the semifinals along with the highest-ranked group runner-up. Orlando were placed in the East region with Washington Spirit, North Carolina Courage and NJ/NY Gotham FC.

| March 19 Group stage | Orlando Pride | 0–0 | Washington Spirit | Orlando, Florida |
| 7:00 pm | Lawrence (yellow card) 31'; Marta (yellow card) 90'; Strom (yellow card) 90+6' | Report | Heilferty (yellow card) 73'; Biegalski (yellow card) 78'; Aylmer (yellow card) 90+2' | Stadium: Exploria Stadium; Attendance: 3,534; Referee: Laura Rodriguez |

| March 26 Group stage | North Carolina Courage | 1–0 | Orlando Pride | Cary, North Carolina |
| 7:00 pm | Smith (yellow card) 23'; Mathias 61' (pen.) | Report | Jónsdóttir (yellow card) 53'; Petersen (yellow card) 69' | Stadium: Sahlen's Stadium; Attendance: 3,328; Referee: Joshua Encarnacion |

| March 30 Group stage | Orlando Pride | 0–1 | Gotham FC | Orlando, Florida |
| 7:00 pm | Strom (yellow card) 4' | Report | Krieger (yellow card) 26'; Zerboni (yellow card) 53'; Purce 86' | Stadium: Exploria Stadium; Attendance: 3,351; Referee: Anya Voigt |

| April 3 Group stage | Washington Spirit | 4–1 | Orlando Pride | Buzzard Point, Washington D.C. |
| 4:00 pm | Sanchez 43'; Sullivan 45'; Hatch 49'; Rodman 87' | Report | James (yellow card) 27'; Jónsdóttir 54'; Turner (yellow card) 74' | Stadium: Audi Field; Attendance: 5,656; Referee: Sergii Demianchuk |

| April 16 Group stage | Orlando Pride | 2–4 | North Carolina Courage | Orlando, Florida |
| 7:00 pm | Jenkins 15', 56', (yellow card) 79'; Lawrence (yellow card) 73'; Montefusco (yellow card) 76' | Report | Montefusco 3' (o.g.); Daniels 6'; Smith 9'; Pinto (yellow card) 85'; Debinha 89' | Stadium: Exploria Stadium; Attendance: 3,601; Referee: Alyssa Nichols |

| April 23 Group stage | Gotham FC | 1–1 | Orlando Pride | Harrison, New Jersey |
| 7:00 pm | Mewis 45+1' (pen.); Zerboni (yellow card) 72' | Report | Jónsdóttir 10' | Stadium: Red Bull Arena; Attendance: 2,734; Referee: Jeremy Scheer |

Standings

| Pos | Team | Pld | W | T | L | GF | GA | GD | Pts | Qualification | NC | WAS | NJY | ORL |
|---|---|---|---|---|---|---|---|---|---|---|---|---|---|---|
| 1 | North Carolina Courage | 6 | 3 | 3 | 0 | 12 | 7 | +5 | 12 | Advance to knockout stage | — | 2–2 | 2–0 | 1–0 |
| 2 | Washington Spirit | 6 | 2 | 4 | 0 | 12 | 7 | +5 | 10 | Advance to knockout stage based on ranking | 2–2 | — | 1–1 | 4–1 |
| 3 | NJ/NY Gotham FC | 6 | 1 | 3 | 2 | 5 | 8 | −3 | 6 | | 1–1 | 1–3 | — | 1–1 |
| 4 | Orlando Pride | 6 | 0 | 2 | 4 | 4 | 11 | −7 | 2 | | 2–4 | 0–0 | 0–1 | — |

Source: NWSL
Rules for classification: 1) Total points; 2) Total goal differential; 3) Total number of goals scored; 4) Head-to-head points record; 5) Head-to-head goal differential; 6) Head-to-head number of goals scored; 7) Fewest disciplinary points; 8) Drawing of lots

== Squad statistics ==
=== Appearances ===
As of match played October 1, 2022

Starting appearances are listed first, followed by substitute appearances after the + symbol where applicable.

| No. | Pos | Nat | Player | Total | | NWSL | | Challenge Cup | |
| No. | Pos | Nat | Player | Apps | Goals | Apps | Goals | Apps | Goals |
Goalkeepers
| 1 | GK | (Canada) CAN | Erin McLeod | 22 | 0 | 20 | 0 | 2 | 0 |
| 18 | GK | (United States) USA | Kaylie Collins | 1 | 0 | 0 | 0 | 1 | 0 |
| 21 | GK | (England) ENG | Anna Moorhouse | 5 | 0 | 2 | 0 | 3 | 0 |
| 40 | GK | (United States) USA | Kelly Rowswell | 0 | 0 | 0 | 0 | 0 | 0 |
Defenders
| 2 | DF | (United States) USA | Haley Hanson | 6 | 0 | 4+2 | 0 | 0 | 0 |
| 3 | DF | (United States) USA | Toni Pressley | 22 | 1 | 16+1 | 1 | 4+1 | 0 |
| 5 | DF | (United States) USA | Megan Montefusco | 26 | 0 | 21 | 0 | 5 | 0 |
| 12 | DF | (United States) USA | Carrie Lawrence | 18 | 0 | 12+2 | 0 | 3+1 | 0 |
| 13 | DF | (Spain) ESP | Celia | 21 | 2 | 17+1 | 2 | 2+1 | 0 |
| 17 | DF | (United States) USA | Courtney Petersen | 25 | 0 | 9+10 | 0 | 6 | 0 |
| 23 | DF | (United States) USA | Kylie Strom | 22 | 1 | 14+3 | 1 | 2+3 | 0 |
| 25 | DF | (United States) USA | Kerry Abello | 24 | 0 | 12+9 | 0 | 1+2 | 0 |
| 26 | DF | (United States) USA | Caitlin Cosme | 0 | 0 | 0 | 0 | 0 | 0 |
Midfielders
| 8 | MF | (Iceland) ISL | Gunnhildur Jónsdóttir | 22 | 4 | 11+5 | 2 | 5+1 | 2 |
| 14 | MF | (United States) USA | Viviana Villacorta | 15 | 0 | 13+2 | 0 | 0 | 0 |
| 15 | MF | (United States) USA | Erika Tymrak | 20 | 0 | 10+5 | 0 | 3+2 | 0 |
| 16 | MF | (United States) USA | Mikayla Cluff | 24 | 2 | 8+10 | 2 | 5+1 | 0 |
| 22 | MF | (United States) USA | Parker Roberts | 4 | 0 | 0+1 | 0 | 1+2 | 0 |
| 27 | MF | (United States) USA | Chelsee Washington | 3 | 0 | 0+1 | 0 | 0+2 | 0 |
| 28 | MF | (United States) USA | Meggie Dougherty Howard | 20 | 3 | 13+2 | 3 | 4+1 | 0 |
| 30 | MF | (Brazil) BRA | Thais Reiss | 5 | 0 | 2+3 | 0 | 0 | 0 |
| 34 | MF | (Canada) CAN | Jordyn Listro | 19 | 0 | 13+6 | 0 | 0 | 0 |
Forwards
| 7 | FW | (Malta) MLT | Haley Bugeja | 3 | 0 | 0+3 | 0 | 0 | 0 |
| 10 | FW | (Brazil) BRA | Marta | 2 | 0 | 0 | 0 | 2 | 0 |
| 11 | FW | (United States) USA | Darian Jenkins | 23 | 4 | 14+3 | 2 | 5+1 | 2 |
| 20 | FW | (United States) USA | Julie Doyle | 17 | 2 | 9+6 | 2 | 0+2 | 0 |
| 33 | FW | (United States) USA | Ally Watt | 6 | 1 | 1+5 | 1 | 0 | 0 |
| 35 | FW | (United States) USA | Leah Pruitt | 16 | 1 | 9+4 | 1 | 2+1 | 0 |
Players who appeared for the club but left during the season:
| 2 | FW | (United States) USA | Sydney Leroux | 10 | 2 | 6+1 | 2 | 3 | 0 |
| 4 | DF | (England) ENG | Amy Turner | 5 | 1 | 0+1 | 1 | 3+1 | 0 |
| 6 | MF | (Wales) WAL | Angharad James | 11 | 0 | 3+3 | 0 | 4+1 | 0 |
| 19 | FW | (United States) USA | Abi Kim | 13 | 0 | 3+8 | 0 | 0+2 | 0 |

=== Goalscorers ===
As of match played October 1, 2022

| Rank | No. | Pos. | Name | NWSL | Cup | Total |
|---|---|---|---|---|---|---|
| 1 | 8 | MF | (Iceland) Gunnhildur Jónsdóttir | 2 | 2 | 4 |
| 1 | 11 | FW | (United States) Darian Jenkins | 2 | 2 | 4 |
| 3 | 28 | MF | (United States) Meggie Dougherty Howard | 3 | 0 | 3 |
| 4 | 2 | FW | (United States) Sydney Leroux | 2 | 0 | 2 |
| 4 | 13 | DF | (Spain) Celia | 2 | 0 | 2 |
| 4 | 16 | MF | (United States) Mikayla Cluff | 2 | 0 | 2 |
| 4 | 20 | FW | (United States) Julie Doyle | 2 | 0 | 2 |
| 8 | 3 | DF | (United States) Toni Pressley | 1 | 0 | 1 |
| 8 | 4 | DF | (England) Amy Turner | 1 | 0 | 1 |
| 8 | 23 | DF | (United States) Kylie Strom | 1 | 0 | 1 |
| 8 | 33 | FW | (United States) Ally Watt | 1 | 0 | 1 |
| 8 | 35 | FW | (United States) Leah Pruitt | 1 | 0 | 1 |
| Own goals | | | | 2 | 0 | 2 |
| Total | | | | 20 | 4 | 24 |

=== Shutouts ===
As of match played October 1, 2022

| Rank | No. | Pos. | Name | NWSL | Cup | Total |
|---|---|---|---|---|---|---|
| 1 | 1 | GK | (Canada) Erin McLeod | 4 | 1 | 5 |
| Total | | | | 4 | 1 | 5 |

=== Disciplinary record ===
As of match played October 1, 2022

| No. | Pos. | Name | NWSL | | | Cup | | | Total | | |
| No. | Pos. | Name | Yellow card | (yellow card) (yellow-red card) | Red card | Yellow card | (yellow card) (yellow-red card) | Red card | Yellow card | (yellow card) (yellow-red card) | Red card |
|---|---|---|---|---|---|---|---|---|---|---|---|
| 1 | GK | (Canada) Erin McLeod | 1 | 0 | 0 | 0 | 0 | 0 | 1 | 0 | 0 |
| 2 | FW | (United States) Sydney Leroux | 1 | 0 | 0 | 0 | 0 | 0 | 1 | 0 | 0 |
| 2 | DF | (United States) Haley Hanson | 1 | 0 | 0 | 0 | 0 | 0 | 1 | 0 | 0 |
| 3 | DF | (United States) Toni Pressley | 3 | 0 | 0 | 0 | 0 | 0 | 3 | 0 | 0 |
| 4 | DF | (England) Amy Turner | 1 | 0 | 0 | 1 | 0 | 0 | 2 | 0 | 0 |
| 5 | DF | (United States) Megan Montefusco | 7 | 0 | 0 | 1 | 0 | 0 | 8 | 0 | 0 |
| 6 | MF | (Wales) Angharad James | 0 | 0 | 0 | 1 | 0 | 0 | 1 | 0 | 0 |
| 8 | MF | (Iceland) Gunnhildur Jónsdóttir | 0 | 0 | 0 | 1 | 0 | 0 | 1 | 0 | 0 |
| 10 | FW | (Brazil) Marta | 0 | 0 | 0 | 1 | 0 | 0 | 1 | 0 | 0 |
| 11 | FW | (United States) Darian Jenkins | 1 | 0 | 0 | 1 | 0 | 0 | 2 | 0 | 0 |
| 12 | DF | (United States) Carrie Lawrence | 0 | 0 | 0 | 2 | 0 | 0 | 2 | 0 | 0 |
| 13 | DF | (Spain) Celia | 1 | 0 | 0 | 0 | 0 | 0 | 1 | 0 | 0 |
| 15 | MF | (United States) Erika Tymrak | 2 | 0 | 0 | 0 | 0 | 0 | 2 | 0 | 0 |
| 16 | MF | (United States) Mikayla Cluff | 2 | 0 | 0 | 0 | 0 | 0 | 2 | 0 | 0 |
| 17 | DF | (United States) Courtney Petersen | 1 | 0 | 0 | 1 | 0 | 0 | 2 | 0 | 0 |
| 23 | DF | (United States) Kylie Strom | 2 | 0 | 0 | 2 | 0 | 0 | 4 | 0 | 0 |
| 25 | DF | (United States) Kerry Abello | 2 | 0 | 0 | 0 | 0 | 0 | 2 | 0 | 0 |
| 27 | MF | (United States) Chelsee Washington | 1 | 0 | 0 | 0 | 0 | 0 | 1 | 0 | 0 |
| 28 | MF | (United States) Meggie Dougherty Howard | 3 | 0 | 0 | 0 | 0 | 0 | 3 | 0 | 0 |
| 30 | MF | (Brazil) Thais Reiss | 1 | 0 | 0 | 0 | 0 | 0 | 1 | 0 | 0 |
| 34 | MF | (Canada) Jordyn Listro | 4 | 0 | 0 | 0 | 0 | 0 | 4 | 0 | 0 |
| 35 | FW | (United States) Leah Pruitt | 1 | 0 | 0 | 0 | 0 | 0 | 1 | 0 | 0 |
| Total | | | 35 | 0 | 0 | 11 | 0 | 0 | 46 | 0 | 0 |

== Transfers and loans ==
=== 2022 NWSL Draft ===
Draft picks are not automatically signed to the team roster. The 2022 college draft was held on December 18, 2021. Orlando made four selections.

| Round | Pick | Player | Pos. | College | Status |
|---|---|---|---|---|---|
| 1 | 5 | (United States) Mia Fishel | FW | University of California, Los Angeles | Not signed |
| 1 | 10 | (United States) Caitlin Cosme | DF | (North Carolina) Duke University | Signed |
| 1 | 11 | (United States) Julie Doyle | FW | (California) Santa Clara University | Signed |
| 3 | 31 | (United States) Jada Talley | FW | University of Southern California | Not signed |

=== Transfers in ===
| Date | Player | Pos. | Previous club | Fee/notes | Ref. |
|---|---|---|---|---|---|
| December 16, 2021 | (Wales) Angharad James | MF | (United States) San Diego Wave | Acquired in a trade with $275,000 in allocation money and 2022 NWSL Expansion Draft protection in exchange for Alex Morgan. | |
| December 18, 2021 | (Spain) Celia | DF | (United States) OL Reign | Acquired in a trade with a first-round pick in the 2022 NWSL Draft and a second-round pick in the 2023 NWSL Draft in exchange for Phoebe McClernon. | |
| December 18, 2021 | (United States) Leah Pruitt | FW | (United States) OL Reign | Acquired in a trade with a first-round pick in the 2022 NWSL Draft and a second-round pick in the 2023 NWSL Draft in exchange for Phoebe McClernon. | |
| January 11, 2022 | (United States) Darian Jenkins | FW | (United States) Kansas City Current | Acquired in a trade in exchange for $75,000 in allocation money and Orlando's natural second-round pick in the 2023 NWSL Draft. | |
| January 26, 2022 | (United States) Mikayla Cluff | MF | (United States) BYU Cougars | Deferred 2021 NWSL Draft signee. | |
| January 28, 2022 | (United States) Megan Montefusco | DF | (United States) Houston Dash | Acquired in a trade with $30,000 in allocation money and OL Reign's natural third-round pick in the 2023 NWSL Draft in exchange for Marisa Viggiano. | |
| January 28, 2022 | (United States) Kerry Abello | DF | (United States) Penn State Nittany Lions | Deferred 2021 NWSL Draft signee. | |
| January 31, 2022 | (England) Anna Moorhouse | GK | (France) Bordeaux | Signed using allocation money. | |
| May 7, 2022 | (Canada) Jordyn Listro | MF | (United States) North Carolina Courage | Free agent signing. | |
| June 11, 2022 | (Brazil) Thais Reiss | MF | (United States) North Florida Ospreys | Free agent signing. | |
| July 1, 2022 | (Malta) Haley Bugeja | FW | (Italy) Sassuolo | | |
| August 15, 2022 | (United States) Ally Watt | FW | (United States) OL Reign | Acquired in a trade in exchange for $125,000 in allocation money. | |
| August 18, 2022 | (United States) Haley Hanson | DF | (United States) Houston Dash | Acquired in a trade in exchange for $75,000 in allocation money and a second-round pick in the 2023 NWSL Draft previously acquired from OL Reign. | |
| September 8, 2022 | (United States) Kelly Rowswell | GK | (France) Issy | Goalkeeper injury replacement signing. | |

=== Transfers out ===
| Date | Player | Pos. | Destination club | Fee/notes | Ref. |
|---|---|---|---|---|---|
| November 1, 2021 | (Canada) Ally Haran | DF | (Australia) Canberra United | Out of contract | |
| December 1, 2021 | (England) Jodie Taylor | FW | (United States) San Diego Wave | Traded in exchange for a second or third-round pick in the 2023 draft or allocation money, pending conditions met. | |
| December 6, 2021 | (United States) Ashlyn Harris | GK | (United States) Gotham FC | Traded in exchange for a first-round pick in the 2022 NWSL Draft, a third-round pick in the 2023 NWSL Draft and $50,000 in allocation money. | |
| December 6, 2021 | (United States) Ali Krieger | DF | (United States) Gotham FC | Traded in exchange for a first-round pick in the 2022 NWSL Draft, a third-round pick in the 2023 NWSL Draft and $50,000 in allocation money. | |
| December 7, 2021 | (Australia) Emily van Egmond | MF | (Australia) Newcastle Jets | Transfer | |
| December 8, 2021 | (Jamaica) Konya Plummer | DF | | Option declined | |
| December 8, 2021 | (United States) Crystal Thomas | FW | (Scotland) Hibernian | Out of contract | |
| December 16, 2021 | (United States) Alex Morgan | FW | (United States) San Diego Wave | Traded in exchange for Angharad James, $275,000 in allocation money and 2022 NWSL Expansion Draft protection. | |
| December 17, 2021 | (United States) Brittany Wilson | GK | (United States) Angel City | Traded with a third-round pick in the 2023 NWSL Draft in exchange for a fourth-round pick in the 2023 NWSL Draft and partial 2022 NWSL Expansion Draft protection. | |
| December 18, 2021 | (United States) Phoebe McClernon | DF | (United States) OL Reign | Traded in exchange for a first-round pick in the 2022 NWSL Draft, a second-round pick in the 2023 NWSL Draft, Celia and Leah Pruitt. | |
| January 18, 2022 | (United States) Taylor Kornieck | MF | (United States) San Diego Wave | Traded with the rights to Emily van Egmond in exchange for $125,000 in allocation money and San Diego's natural second-round pick in the 2024 NWSL Draft. | |
| January 27, 2022 | (New Zealand) Ali Riley | DF | (United States) Angel City | Traded in exchange for $15,000 in allocation money and Angel City's natural third-round pick in the 2023 NWSL Draft. | |
| January 27, 2022 | (England) Jade Moore | MF | (England) Manchester United | Out of contract | |
| January 28, 2022 | (United States) Marisa Viggiano | MF | (United States) Houston Dash | Traded in exchange for Megan Montefusco, $30,000 in allocation money and OL Reign's natural third-round pick in the 2023 NWSL Draft. | |
| June 17, 2022 | (England) Amy Turner | DF | (England) Tottenham Hotspur | Executed contract buyout. | |
| June 29, 2022 | (United States) Sydney Leroux | FW | (United States) Angel City | Traded in exchange for $75,000 in allocation money and Angel City's natural first-round pick in the 2024 NWSL Draft. | |
| July 28, 2022 | (Wales) Angharad James | MF | (England) Tottenham Hotspur | Mutually terminated contract. | |
| August 24, 2022 | (United States) Abi Kim | FW | (France) Bordeaux | Waived. | |

=== Loans out ===
| Date | Player | Pos. | Loaned to | Notes | Ref. |
|---|---|---|---|---|---|
| November 1, 2021 | (United States) Chelsee Washington | MF | (Australia) Canberra United | Until April 3, 2022 | |

=== Preseason trialists ===
Orlando Pride began preseason training on February 1, 2022. The squad included two non-roster invitees on trial with the team during preseason. Reiss was an undrafted out of the University of North Florida. Scarpa had spent the last season with KIF Örebro DFF in the Swedish Damallsvenskan. Ru Mucherera, who had signed in Finland with KuPS for the 2021 season, later joined Orlando in preseason having spent the first part on trial with San Diego Wave.

2022 Orlando Pride trialists
| Player | Position | Previous team |
|---|---|---|
| (Brazil) Thais Reiss | MF | (United States) North Florida Ospreys |
| (United States) Jessie Scarpa | FW | (Sweden) KIF Örebro DFF |
| (United States) Ru Mucherera | FW | (Finland) KuPS |

Signed to first team contract.
