= 2022 NWSL expansion draft =

Soccer draft

2022 NWSL Expansion Draft

General information
- Sport: Soccer
- Date: December 16, 2021
- Time: 7 p.m. EST
- Location: Los Angeles, California
- Network: CBS Sports
- Sponsored by: Ally

Overview
- 18 total selections in 1 rounds
- League: National Women's Soccer League
- Expansion teams: Angel City FC; San Diego Wave FC
- Expansion season: 2022

The 2022 NWSL Expansion Draft (formerly named the 2021 NWSL Expansion Draft) was an expansion draft held by the National Women's Soccer League (NWSL) on December 16, 2021, for two expansion teams, Angel City FC and San Diego Wave FC, to select players from existing teams in the league. Kansas City Current were exempt from the draft.

== Format ==
Each of the NWSL's current teams (with the exception of Kansas City Current, who were exempt from the draft) was allowed to protect nine players, including a maximum of one United States federation player. Angel City FC and San Diego Wave FC were allowed to select one player from each team, for a total of nine players each. Per result of a coin flip, Angel City FC picked first.

Each of the NWSL's existing teams could lose no more than one United States federation player and no more than one player from each position group in total. Angel City FC and San Diego Wave FC could select no more than one United States federation player in total.

== Draft results ==
- Blue highlights indicate United States federation players
- Italics indicate players who are not under contract but whose NWSL playing rights remain with the team

| Pick | Selecting team | Nat. | Player | Pos. | Previous team | Ref. |
|---|---|---|---|---|---|---|
| 1 | Angel City FC | (United States) | Dani Weatherholt | MF | OL Reign | |
| 2 | San Diego Wave FC | (United States) | Kristie Mewis | MF | Houston Dash | |
| 3 | Angel City FC | (Scotland) | Claire Emslie | FW | Orlando Pride | |
| 4 | San Diego Wave FC | (United States) | Kristen McNabb | DF | OL Reign | |
| 5 | Angel City FC | (United States) | Jasmyne Spencer | FW | Houston Dash | |
| 6 | San Diego Wave FC | PASS | | | | |
| 7 | Angel City FC | (United States) | Paige Nielsen | DF | Washington Spirit | |
| 8 | San Diego Wave FC | PASS | | | | |
| 9 | San Diego Wave FC | (United States) | Kaleigh Riehl | DF | Racing Louisville FC | |

== Protected lists by team ==
Besides Kansas City Current, who were already exempt from the draft per their expansion agreement with the league, the following teams traded for protection prior to December 10, 2021:

- On August 23, 2021, Racing Louisville FC traded for roster protection from Angel City FC.
- On December 1, Washington Spirit also traded for roster protection from San Diego Wave FC.
- On December 2, Chicago Red Stars traded for roster protection from both Angel City FC and San Diego Wave FC.
- On December 4, NJ/NY Gotham FC traded for roster protection also from San Diego Wave FC.
- On December 6, Washington Spirit traded for federation player protection while OL Reign also traded for a partial protection from Angel City FC.
- On December 8, NJ/NY Gotham FC and Portland Thorns FC both traded for roster protection from Angel City FC, while North Carolina Courage also traded for roster protection from both Angel City FC and San Diego Wave FC.

On December 10, 2021, the NWSL released the protected lists from teams participating in the draft.

- **Bold** indicates players selected in the Expansion Draft
- Blue highlights indicate United States federation players
- Italics indicate players who are not under contract but whose NWSL playing rights remain with the team

=== Houston Dash ===
| Protected | Unprotected |
|---|---|
| Jane Campbell | Michaela Abam |
| Rachel Daly | Michelle Alozie |
| Makamae Gomera-Stevens | Joelle Anderson |
| Shea Groom | Bridgette Andrzejewski |
| Haley Hanson | Allysha Chapman |
| Katie Naughton | Taylor Comeau |
| Nichelle Prince | Niki Cross |
| Maria Sanchez | Amanda Dennis |
| Gabby Seiler | Hannah Diaz |
| | Marissa Diggs |
| | Lindsey Harris |
| | Melissa Henderson |
| | Bianca Henninger |
| | Savannah Jordan |
| | Veronica Latsko |
| | **Kristie Mewis** |
| | Christine Nairn |
| | Emily Ogle |
| | Megan Oyster |
| | Ally Prisock |
| | Annika Schmidt |
| | Sophie Schmidt |
| | **Jasmyne Spencer** |
| | Bri Visalli |

=== OL Reign ===
| Protected | Unprotected |
|---|---|
| Bethany Balcer | Lauren Barnes |
| Alana Cook | Amber Brooks |
| Angelina | Mariah Bullock |
| Jess Fishlock | Steph Catley |
| Sofia Huerta | Stephanie Cox |
| Rose Lavelle | Kiersten Dallstream |
| Quinn | Ella Dederick |
| Phallon Tullis-Joyce | Madison Hammond |
| Ally Watt | Kelcie Hedge |
| | Sam Hiatt |
| | Celia |
| | Adrienne Jordan |
| | Tziarra King |
| | Alyssa Kleiner |
| | Jimena Lopez |
| | **Kristen McNabb** |
| | Sinclaire Miramontez |
| | Cosette Morché |
| | Theresa Nielsen |
| | Morgan Proffitt |
| | Leah Pruitt |
| | Megan Rapinoe |
| | Nikki Stanton |
| | Rumi Utsugi |
| | Abby Wambach |
| | **Dani Weatherholt** |
| | Lydia Williams |
| | Beverly Yanez |

=== Orlando Pride ===
| Protected | Unprotected |
|---|---|
| Mikayla Colohan | Kerry Abello |
| Taylor Kornieck | Kaylie Collins |
| Sydney Leroux | **Claire Emslie** |
| Phoebe McClernon | Joanna Fennema |
| Alex Morgan | Caitlin Farrell |
| Courtney Petersen | Meggie Dougherty Howard |
| Amy Turner | Gunnhildur Jónsdóttir |
| Marta | Abi Kim |
| Viviana Villacorta | Carrie Lawrence |
| | Camila |
| | Erin McLeod |
| | Jade Moore |
| | Toni Pressley |
| | Ali Riley |
| | Parker Roberts |
| | Kylie Strom |
| | Erika Tymrak |
| | Emily Van Egmond |
| | Marisa Viggiano |
| | Chelsee Washington |
| | Brittany Wilson |
| | Shelina Zadorsky |

=== Portland Thorns FC ===
| Protected | Unprotected |
|---|---|
| Bella Bixby | Amirah Ali |
| Crystal Dunn | Nadine Angerer |
| Lindsey Horan | Hannah Betfort |
| Natalia Kuikka | Celeste Boureille |
| Emily Menges | Sam Coffey |
| Olivia Moultrie | Marian Dougherty |
| Raquel Rodriguez | Britt Eckerstrom |
| Sophia Smith | Marissa Everett |
| Morgan Weaver | Shelby Hogan |
| | Kelli Hubly |
| | Meghan Klingenberg |
| | Andressinha |
| | Nikki Marshall |
| | Meg Morris |
| | Meaghan Nally |
| | Madison Pogarch |
| | Hayley Raso |
| | Kat Reynolds |
| | Yazmeen Ryan |
| | Angela Salem |
| | Becky Sauerbrunn |
| | Christine Sinclair |
| | Kat Tarr |
| | Rachel Van Hollebeke |
| | Christen Westphal |
| | Sandra Yu |

=== Racing Louisville FC ===
| Protected | Unprotected |
|---|---|
| Gemma Bonner | Julia Ashley |
| Kirsten Davis | Janine Beckie |
| Emina Ekic | Caitlin Foord |
| Emily Fox | Parker Goins |
| Cece Kizer | Tobin Heath |
| Katie Lund | Alanna Kennedy |
| Nadia Nadim | Nealy Martin |
| Freja Olofsson | Cheyna Matthews |
| Ebony Salmon | Savannah McCaskill |
| | Addisyn Merrick |
| | Lauren Milliet |
| | Yūki Nagasato |
| | Taylor Otto |
| | **Kaleigh Riehl** |
| | Erin Simon |
| | Emily Smith |

=== Washington Spirit ===
| Protected | Unprotected |
|---|---|
| Dorian Bailey | Taylor Aylmer |
| Aubrey Bledsoe | Camryn Biegalski |
| Bayley Feist | Averie Collins |
| Ashley Hatch | Jordan DiBiasi |
| Tara McKeown | Morgan Goff |
| Julia Roddar | Anna Heilferty |
| Trinity Rodman | Tori Huster |
| Ashley Sanchez | Devon Kerr |
| Sam Staab | Lori Lindsey |
| | Joanna Lohman |
| | **Paige Nielsen** |
| | Kelley O'Hara |
| | Karina Rodriguez |
| | Sydney Schneider |
| | Emily Sonnett |
| | Andi Sullivan |
| | Saori Takarada |
| | Kumi Yokoyama |

== See also ==
- List of NWSL drafts
- 2022 National Women's Soccer League season
- 2022 NWSL Draft
