= 2021 Orlando Pride season =

Orlando Pride
2021 season
- Head coach: Marc Skinner (until July 23); Carl Green (interim, July 23 – July 24); Becky Burleigh (interim, from July 25)
- Stadium: Exploria Stadium; Orlando, Florida
- NWSL: 8th of 10
- Playoffs: Did not qualify
- Challenge Cup: 3rd (East division)
- Top goalscorer: League: Sydney Leroux (8); All: Sydney Leroux (9)
- Highest home attendance: 5,755
- Lowest home attendance: 3,407
- Average home league attendance: 4,227
Home colors	Away colors

The 2021 Orlando Pride season was Orlando Pride's sixth season in the National Women's Soccer League, the top division of women's soccer in the United States.

== Notable events ==
On November 12, 2020, with the addition of Racing Louisville FC ahead of the 2021 NWSL season, the NWSL held the 2020 NWSL Expansion Draft. Alanna Kennedy, who had been with the Pride since 2017, was selected as were the NWSL rights to Caitlin Foord which Orlando had acquired from Portland Thorns FC as part of the trade for Emily Sonnett in January 2020 but she had elected to sign outside the NWSL with English FA WSL team Arsenal instead.

On January 12, Orlando announced Ian Fleming had joined from the Houston Dynamo and Dash group to become general manager of the Pride, filling the vacant role left by Erik Ustruck in January 2020.

On February 25, the NWSL announced the list of federated players for the upcoming season. It included four Pride players: US internationals Ashlyn Harris, Ali Krieger and Alex Morgan all retained their status while Canadian goalkeeper Erin McLeod was given federated status for the first time since 2015 meaning she would no longer require an international roster slot.

On April 5, U.S. Soccer and NWSL announced it would be trialing the new IFAB approved concussion substitutes rule allowing for two additional substitutions in each match to be used for players with suspected concussions. The new rule was implemented on top of the increase from three to five "normal" substitutes carried over from the 2020 season.

On April 21, Orlando Pride beat Washington Spirit 1–0 in the Challenge Cup, their first win since August 21, 2019, snapping a streak of 13 winless games in 609 days. The match also marked the first time Marta, Sydney Leroux and Alex Morgan all started a game for Orlando together since July 2018.

Four Orlando Pride players were selected to represent their nations at the delayed 2020 Tokyo Olympics in July: Marta, Erin McLeod, Alex Morgan and Ali Riley.

On July 21, the sale of Orlando City SC and related soccer assets including Orlando Pride by Flavio Augusto da Silva, who took over in 2013, was completed. Zygi, Leonard and Mark Wilf became the new majority owners with the DeVos family, led by Dan DeVos, entering as minority owners. The combined value of the deal was estimated at $400–450 million.

On July 23, Marc Skinner stepped down as head coach amid reports he had agreed terms with Manchester United. His assistant, Carl Green, took temporary control for the team's match against OL Reign the following day before also departing. Becky Burleigh, who had retired after 26 seasons as head coach of the Florida Gators in April, was appointed interim head coach for the remainder of the 2021 season on July 25.

On July 28, it was announced Alex Leitão, the chief executive officer of the Orlando City SC organization since 2015, was stepping down from his role.

On October 1, the NWSL announced all scheduled games would not take place that weekend following allegations of historic abuse and sexual coercion against former North Carolina Courage coach Paul Riley. Riley was the fourth head coach to be sacked having been accused of misconduct during the 2021 season after Farid Benstiti, Richie Burke and Christy Holly.

== Roster ==
As of October 7, 2021

No.	Nationality	Name	Position(s)	Date of birth (age)	Previous club	Notes
Goalkeepers
1	(Canada)	Erin McLeod	GK	February 26, 1983 (aged 38)	(Sweden) Växjö DFF	FED
18	(United States)	Kaylie Collins	GK	May 17, 1998 (aged 22)	(United States) USC Trojans	–
24	(United States)	Ashlyn Harris	GK	October 19, 1985 (aged 35)	(United States) Washington Spirit	FED
30	(United States)	Brittany Wilson	GK	September 22, 1997 (aged 23)	(United States) Denver Pioneers	SUP
Defenders
3	(United States)	Toni Pressley	DF	February 19, 1990 (aged 31)	(United States) Houston Dash	–
4	(England)	Amy Turner	DF	July 4, 1991 (aged 29)	(England) Manchester United	INT
7	(New Zealand)	Ali Riley	DF	October 30, 1987 (aged 33)	(Germany) Bayern Munich	–
11	(United States)	Ali Krieger	DF	July 28, 1984 (aged 36)	(United States) Washington Spirit	FED
12	(United States)	Carrie Lawrence	DF	July 15, 1997 (aged 23)	(United States) UCF Knights	SUP
17	(United States)	Courtney Petersen	DF	October 28, 1997 (aged 23)	(United States) Virginia Cavaliers	–
21	(United States)	Phoebe McClernon	DF	December 13, 1997 (aged 23)	(Sweden) Växjö DFF	–
23	(United States)	Kylie Strom	DF	March 18, 1992 (aged 29)	(Spain) Atlético Madrid	–
26	(Canada)	Ally Haran	DF	May 21, 1996 (aged 24)	(United States) Houston Dash	SUP
Midfielders
5	(Australia)	Emily van Egmond	MF	July 12, 1993 (aged 27)	(England) West Ham United	INT
6	(England)	Jade Moore	MF	October 22, 1990 (aged 30)	(England) Reading	INT
8	(Iceland)	Gunnhildur Jónsdóttir	MF	September 28, 1988 (aged 32)	(United States) Kansas City NWSL	–
14	(United States)	Marisa Viggiano	MF	February 5, 1997 (aged 24)	(United States) Northwestern Wildcats	–
15	(United States)	Erika Tymrak	MF	August 7, 1991 (aged 29)	(United States) Utah Royals	–
20	(United States)	Parker Roberts	MF	July 30, 1997 (aged 23)	(United States) Florida Gators	–
22	(United States)	Taylor Kornieck	MF	November 22, 1998 (aged 22)	(United States) Colorado Buffaloes	–
27	(United States)	Chelsee Washington	MF	November 17, 1997 (aged 23)	(United States) Bowling Green Falcons	SUP
28	(United States)	Meggie Dougherty Howard	MF	July 27, 1995 (aged 25)	(United States) Washington Spirit	–
32	(United States)	Viviana Villacorta	MF	February 2, 1999 (aged 22)	(United States) UCLA Bruins	
Forwards
2	(United States)	Sydney Leroux	FW	May 7, 1990 (aged 30)	(United States) FC Kansas City	–
9	(England)	Jodie Taylor	FW	May 17, 1986 (aged 34)	(France) Olympique Lyon	INT
10	(Brazil)	Marta	FW	February 19, 1986 (aged 35)	(Sweden) FC Rosengård	–
13	(United States)	Alex Morgan	FW	July 2, 1989 (aged 31)	(England) Tottenham Hotspur	FED
29	(United States)	Abi Kim	FW	July 19, 1998 (aged 22)	(Italy) Fiorentina	–
31	(United States)	Crystal Thomas	FW	January 18, 1994 (aged 27)	(United States) Washington Spirit	–

== Staff ==
As of July 28, 2021.

Executive
Majority owner and chairman	(United States) Mark Wilf
Majority owner and vice-chair	(United States) Zygi Wilf
Majority owner and vice-chair	(United States) Leonard Wilf
Executive vice president	(United States) Amanda Duffy
General manager	(United States) Ian Fleming
Coaching staff
Head coach	(United States) Becky Burleigh (interim)
Assistant coach	(England) Alan Kirkup (interim)
Coach	(England) Seb Hines
Goalkeeping coach	(England) Lloyd Yaxley

== Match results ==
=== Friendlies ===
As per the league schedule, NWSL teams were permitted to begin preseason activities on February 1, 2021. Orlando Pride scheduled five preseason friendlies.

March 3	Orlando Pride	0–1	Kansas City NWSL	Sanford, Florida
1:00 pm		Report	Strom-Okimoto 58'	Stadium: Sylvan Lake Park; Attendance: Behind-closed-doors

March 13	Florida State Seminoles	1–2	Orlando Pride	Tallahassee, Florida
2:00 pm	Nighswonger 86'	Report	Morgan 37'; Marta 40'	Stadium: Seminole Soccer Complex; Attendance: Behind-closed-doors

March 14	Orlando Pride	4–0	Flagler Saints	Sanford, Florida
12:00 pm	Kornieck 6'; Haran 16'; Washington 80', 83'	Report		Stadium: Sylvan Lake Park; Attendance: Behind-closed-doors

March 20	Washington Spirit	Canceled	Orlando Pride	West Palm Beach, Florida
Note: Canceled following positive COVID-19 test within Washington Spirit squad.

April 3	Orlando Pride	1–2	Florida State Seminoles	Sanford, Florida
1:00 pm	Kornieck 45'		3'; 77'	Stadium: Sylvan Lake Park; Attendance: Behind-closed-doors

=== National Women's Soccer League ===
The NWSL regular season will begin on May 15 and conclude on October 30. Six teams will qualify for the playoffs.

==== Results summary ====
Overall								Home						Away					
Pld	W	D	L	GF	GA	GD	Pts	W	D	L	GF	GA	GD	W	D	L	GF	GA	GD
24	7	7	10	27	32	−5	28	3	5	4	13	15	−2	4	2	6	14	17	−3

Last updated: October 29, 2021.
Source: NWSLsoccer.com

==== Results by round ====
Round	1	2	3	4	5	6	7	8	9	10	11	12	13	14	15	16	17	18	19	20	21	22	23	24
Stadium	H	A	H	H	A	H	A	A	H	H	A	H	A	A	H	A	A	H	H	A	H	A	A	H
Result	D	W	W	W	D	D	W	L	L	D	L	L	D	W	D	L	W	D	W	L	L	L	L	L
Position (Note: ORL's position at the end of the matchweek, not their match.)	4	2	1	1	1	1	1	1	2	2	5	7	7	4	4	6	4	4	4	5	8	8	8	8

Updated to match(es) played on October 29, 2021. Source: NWSLsoccer.com
A = Away; H = Home; W = Win; D = Draw; L = Loss

==== Results ====
May 16 1	Orlando Pride	1–1	Washington Spirit	Orlando, Florida
6:00 pm	Morgan 84'	Report	Hatch (yellow card) 74', (goal) 76'	Stadium: Exploria Stadium; Referee: Karen Callado

May 22 2	North Carolina Courage	1–2	Orlando Pride	Cary, North Carolina
7:00 pm	Hamilton (yellow card) 39'; McDonald 89'; Pickett (yellow card) 90+7'	Report	Leroux 36'; Morgan 79'; Viggiano (yellow card) 83'; Petersen (yellow card) 89'	Stadium: Sahlen's Stadium; Referee: Alexandra Billeter

May 26 3	Orlando Pride	2–1	Portland Thorns	Orlando, Florida
7:00 pm	Morgan 22'; Leroux 46'; Harris (yellow card) 90+7'	Report	Charley (yellow card) 38', (goal) 42'; Salem (yellow card) 45+3'	Stadium: Exploria Stadium; Referee: Laura Rodriguez

May 30 4	Orlando Pride	1–0	Kansas City NWSL	Orlando, Florida
6:00 pm	Morgan 16'; Jónsdóttir (yellow card) 37'	Report	McCain (yellow card) 37'; Weber (yellow card) 45'; Larroquette (yellow card) 62'	Stadium: Exploria Stadium; Referee: Alyssa Nichols
Note: Marta was originally credited with the goal. It was review by the NWSL and awarded to Alex Morgan on June 1.

June 6 5	Washington Spirit	1–1	Orlando Pride	Buzzard Point, Washington D.C.
2:00 pm	Hatch 64'; Heilferty (yellow card) 90+1'	Report	Petersen (yellow card) 39'; Morgan (yellow card) 45+1'; Kornieck 67'	Stadium: Audi Field; Referee: Adorae Monroy

June 20 6	Orlando Pride	1–1	Gotham FC	Orlando, Florida
6:00 pm	McClernon (yellow card) 26'; Petersen 90'	Report	Cudjoe (yellow card) 35'; Dydasco 45'	Stadium: Exploria Stadium; Referee: Alexandra Billeter

June 23 7	Kansas City NWSL	1–3	Orlando Pride	Kansas City, Kansas
2:00 pm	Larroquette 45+8'	Report	Tymrak (yellow card) 45+6'; Dougherty Howard (yellow card) 45+8'; Leroux 45+11', 49'; Marta 85'	Stadium: Field of Legends; Referee: Samantha Martinez

June 26 8	Houston Dash	2–1	Orlando Pride	Houston, Texas
8:30 pm	Sánchez 18'; Latsko 26'; Hanson (yellow card) 90+5'	Report	Jónsdóttir 49'; Dougherty Howard (yellow card) 56'; Marta (yellow card) 90'	Stadium: BBVA Stadium; Referee: Karen Callado

July 4 9	Orlando Pride	0–2	North Carolina Courage	Orlando, Florida
6:00 pm		Report	Debinha 3'; Pickett (yellow card) 29'; Solaun 66'; R. Williams (yellow card) 90+1'	Stadium: Exploria Stadium; Referee: Karen Abt

July 9 10	Orlando Pride	1–1	Racing Louisville	Orlando, Florida
7:00 pm	Jónsdóttir (yellow card) 33'; Leroux 90+4'	Report	Salmon 21'; McCaskill (yellow card) 36'; Ekic (yellow card) 73'; Matthews (yellow card) 82'	Stadium: Exploria Stadium; Referee: Natalie Simon

July 18 11	Portland Thorns	2–1	Orlando Pride	Portland, Oregon
10:30 pm	Smith 26'; Everett 58'; Ryan (yellow card) 80'; Pogarch (yellow card) 90+1'	Report	Dougherty Howard (yellow card) 60'; McClernon (yellow card) 82'; Viggiano 90+5'	Stadium: Providence Park; Referee: Laura Rodriguez

July 24 12	Orlando Pride	0–2	OL Reign	Orlando, Florida
7:00 pm	Turner (yellow card) 59'; Viggiano (yellow card) 68'; Leroux (yellow card) 88'	Report	Fishlock 10'; Hiatt (yellow card) 15'; Cook (yellow card) 35'; King 51'; McNabb (yellow card) 89'; Barnes (yellow card) 90+1'	Stadium: Exploria Stadium; Referee: John Matto

July 31 13	North Carolina Courage	1–1	Orlando Pride	Cary, North Carolina
7:00 pm	Roccaro (yellow card) 39'; Ratcliffe 52'	Report	Krieger (yellow card) 16'; Strom (yellow card) 45'; Leroux 50'	Stadium: Sahlen's Stadium; Referee: Karen Callado

August 8 14	Chicago Red Stars	0–2	Orlando Pride	Bridgeview, Illinois
6:00 pm		Report	Taylor 15', (yellow card) 43'; Turner (yellow card) 45+1'; Kornieck (yellow card) 69'; Leroux 89'	Stadium: SeatGeek Stadium; Referee: Luis Guardia

August 14 15	Orlando Pride	1–1	Portland Thorns	Orlando, Florida
7:00 pm	Taylor 13'; Riley (yellow card) 37'; Marta (yellow card) 56'; McClernon (yellow card) 67'; Jónsdóttir (yellow card) 89'; Krieger (yellow card) 90+3'	Report	Charley 78'; Everett (yellow card) 86'	Stadium: Exploria Stadium; Referee: Matt Franz

August 22 16	Washington Spirit	2–1	Orlando Pride	Buzzard Point, Washington D.C.
5:00 pm	Hatch 70'; Sanchez 89'	Report	Turner (yellow card) 45+1'; Marta 68'; Strom (yellow card) 76'	Stadium: Audi Field; Referee: Tori Penso

August 29 17	Gotham FC	0–1	Orlando Pride	Harrison, New Jersey
5:00 pm	Dydasco (yellow card) 54'; Johnson (yellow card) 83'	Report	Tymrak 49'; Viggiano (yellow card) 90+2'	Stadium: Red Bull Arena; Referee: Kevin Broadley

September 5 18	Orlando Pride	1–1	Houston Dash	Orlando, Florida
6:00 pm	Dougherty Howard (yellow card) 70'; Kornieck 79'	Report	Daly 10', (yellow card) 53'; Seiler (yellow card) 68'	Stadium: Exploria Stadium; Referee: Katja Koroleva

September 11 19	Orlando Pride	3–1	Racing Louisville	Orlando, Florida
7:00 pm	McClernon (yellow card) 14'; Leroux 30'; Marta 34'; Morgan 65'	Report	Kizer 51'	Stadium: Exploria Stadium; Referee: Elton Garcia

September 26 20	OL Reign	3–0	Orlando Pride	Tacoma, Washington
7:00 pm	Balcer 3'; Le Sommer 28', 32'	Report	Taylor (yellow card) 30'; Turner (yellow card) 62'; Riley (yellow card) 73'	Stadium: Cheney Stadium; Referee: Malik Badawi

October 2	Chicago Red Stars	P–P	Orlando Pride	Bridgeview, Illinois
8:00 pm				Stadium: SeatGeek Stadium
Note: All weekend games postponed following coaching abuse scandal

October 9 21	Orlando Pride	2–3	Gotham FC	Orlando, Florida
7:00 pm	Dougherty Howard (yellow card) 65'; Tymrak 84'; Marta 89' (pen.)	Report	Thiney 3', 47'; Purce 50'; Lee (yellow card) 81'	Stadium: Exploria Stadium; Referee: Brad Jensen
Note: Game paused in the 6th minute to protest coaching abuse scandal

October 13 22	Chicago Red Stars	1–0	Orlando Pride	Bridgeview, Illinois
8:00 pm	Watt 6', (yellow card) 43'; Boyd (yellow card) 45'; Pugh (yellow card) 90+1'	Report		Stadium: SeatGeek Stadium; Referee: Karen Abt
Note: Rescheduled from October 2

October 16 23	Racing Louisville	3–1	Orlando Pride	Butchertown, Kentucky
7:30 pm	Salmon 45+1'; McClure 52'; Nagasato 77'	Report	Taylor 3', (yellow card) 16'	Stadium: Lynn Family Stadium; Referee: Matt Franz

October 29 24	Orlando Pride	0–1	Chicago Red Stars	Orlando, Florida
7:00 pm	Strom (yellow card) 30'	Report	Watt (yellow card) 55', (goal) 65'	Stadium: Exploria Stadium; Referee: Elvis Osmanovic

League standings

Pos	Team	Pld	W	D	L	GF	GA	GD	Pts	Qualification
1	Portland Thorns FC	24	13	5	6	33	17	+16	44	NWSL Shield
2	OL Reign	24	13	3	8	37	24	+13	42	Playoffs – Semi-finals
3	Washington Spirit (C)	24	11	6	7	29	26	+3	39	Playoffs – First round
4	Chicago Red Stars	24	11	5	8	28	28	0	38	Playoffs – First round
5	NJ/NY Gotham FC	24	8	11	5	29	21	+8	35	Playoffs – First round
6	North Carolina Courage	24	9	6	9	28	23	+5	33	Playoffs – First round
7	Houston Dash	24	9	5	10	31	31	0	32	
8	Orlando Pride	24	7	7	10	27	32	−5	28	
9	Racing Louisville FC	24	5	7	12	21	40	−19	22	
10	Kansas City	24	3	7	14	15	36	−21	16	

Source: NWSL
Rules for classification: Tiebreakers
(C) Champions

=== NWSL Challenge Cup ===
Following the success of the 2020 NWSL Challenge Cup as a replacement tournament, the NWSL announced the return of the competition as part of the regular schedule in 2021. The competition is scheduled to begin on April 9, prior to the start of the NWSL regular season. With the league split regionally into two groups of five, teams were scheduled to play each divisional opponent once with the top team progressing to the final. Orlando Pride were placed in the East division with North Carolina Courage, NJ/NY Gotham FC, Washington Spirit, and new expansion franchise Racing Louisville.

Group stage

April 10 Group stage	Racing Louisville	2–2	Orlando Pride	Butchertown, Kentucky
7:00 pm	Kizer 12'; Fox (yellow card) 66'; Baucom (yellow card) 83'; Hendrix 90+3'	Report	Kornieck (yellow card) 35', (goal) 44'; Kim 88'	Stadium: Lynn Family Stadium; Attendance: 5,300; Referee: Katja Koroleva

April 14 Group stage	Orlando Pride	0–1	Gotham FC	Orlando, Florida
7:00 pm	Plummer (yellow card) 82'	Report	Skroski (yellow card) 24'; Dydasco (yellow card) 52'; Monaghan 79'	Stadium: Exploria Stadium; Referee: Natalie Simon

April 21 Group stage	Orlando Pride	1–0	Washington Spirit	Orlando, Florida
7:00 pm	Leroux 11'; Marta (yellow card) 13'; Riley (yellow card) 36'; Harris (yellow card) 80'	Report	Sonnett (yellow card) 6'; O'Hara (yellow card) 86' (yellow-red card) 90+2'	Stadium: Exploria Stadium; Referee: Alexandra Billeter

May 1 Group stage	North Carolina Courage	0–0	Orlando Pride	Cary, North Carolina
7:30 pm	DeBree (yellow card) 2'	Report		Stadium: Sahlen's Stadium; Attendance: 2,426; Referee: Katja Koroleva

Pos	Team	Pld	W	D	L	GF	GA	GD	Pts	Qualification
1	NJ/NY Gotham FC	4	2	2	0	5	3	+2	8	Qualification for the Championship
2	North Carolina Courage	4	2	1	1	9	8	+1	7	
3	Orlando Pride	4	1	2	1	3	3	0	5	
4	Washington Spirit	4	1	1	2	3	4	−1	4	
5	Racing Louisville FC	4	0	2	2	4	6	−2	2	

Source: NWSL
Rules for classification: Tiebreakers

== Squad statistics ==
=== Appearances ===
As of match played October 29, 2021

Starting appearances are listed first, followed by substitute appearances after the + symbol where applicable.

No.	Pos	Nat	Player	Total		NWSL		Challenge Cup	
No.	Pos	Nat	Player	Apps	Goals	Apps	Goals	Apps	Goals
Goalkeepers
1	GK	(Canada) CAN	Erin McLeod	6	0	5+1	0	0	0
18	GK	(United States) USA	Kaylie Collins	0	0	0	0	0	0
24	GK	(United States) USA	Ashlyn Harris	23	0	19	0	4	0
30	GK	(United States) USA	Brittany Wilson	0	0	0	0	0	0
Defenders
3	DF	(United States) USA	Toni Pressley	14	0	4+7	0	1+2	0
4	DF	(England) ENG	Amy Turner	14	0	12+2	0	0	0
7	DF	(New Zealand) NZL	Ali Riley	24	0	18+2	0	4	0
11	DF	(United States) USA	Ali Krieger	26	0	23	0	3	0
12	DF	(United States) USA	Carrie Lawrence	0	0	0	0	0	0
17	DF	(United States) USA	Courtney Petersen	25	1	21+1	1	1+2	0
21	DF	(United States) USA	Phoebe McClernon	25	0	15+6	0	4	0
23	DF	(United States) USA	Kylie Strom	9	0	4+5	0	0	0
26	DF	(Canada) CAN	Ally Haran	2	0	0+2	0	0	0
Midfielders
5	MF	(Australia) AUS	Emily van Egmond	2	0	0+2	0	0	0
6	MF	(England) ENG	Jade Moore	4	0	0	0	4	0
8	MF	(Iceland) ISL	Gunnhildur Jónsdóttir	26	1	24	1	2	0
14	MF	(United States) USA	Marisa Viggiano	25	1	14+7	1	4	0
15	MF	(United States) USA	Erika Tymrak	22	2	6+14	2	0+2	0
20	MF	(United States) USA	Parker Roberts	2	0	0+2	0	0	0
22	MF	(United States) USA	Taylor Kornieck	26	3	13+9	2	4	1
27	MF	(United States) USA	Chelsee Washington	11	0	2+8	0	0+1	0
28	MF	(United States) USA	Meggie Dougherty Howard	24	0	15+6	0	1+2	0
32	MF	(United States) USA	Viviana Villacorta	0	0	0	0	0	0
Forwards
2	FW	(United States) USA	Sydney Leroux	27	9	23	8	4	1
9	FW	(England) ENG	Jodie Taylor	13	3	13	3	0	0
10	FW	(Brazil) BRA	Marta	23	4	17+2	4	4	0
13	FW	(United States) USA	Alex Morgan	15	5	12+1	5	2	0
29	FW	(United States) USA	Abi Kim	8	1	1+5	0	0+2	1
31	FW	(United States) USA	Crystal Thomas	10	0	3+6	0	0+1	0
Players away from the club on loan:
25	DF	(Jamaica) JAM	Konya Plummer	5	0	0+3	0	2	0

=== Goalscorers ===
As of match played October 29, 2021

Rank	No.	Pos.	Name	NWSL	Cup	Total
1	2	FW	(United States) Sydney Leroux	8	1	9
2	13	FW	(United States) Alex Morgan	5	0	5
3	10	FW	(Brazil) Marta	4	0	4
4	9	FW	(England) Jodie Taylor	3	0	3
4	22	MF	(United States) Taylor Kornieck	2	1	3
6	15	MF	(United States) Erika Tymrak	2	0	2
7	8	MF	(Iceland) Gunnhildur Jónsdóttir	1	0	1
7	14	MF	(United States) Marisa Viggiano	1	0	1
7	17	DF	(United States) Courtney Petersen	1	0	1
7	29	FW	(United States) Abi Kim	0	1	1
Total				24	3	27

=== Shutouts ===
As of match played October 29, 2021

Rank	No.	Pos.	Name	NWSL	Cup	Total
1	24	GK	(United States) Ashlyn Harris	3	2	5
2	1	GK	(Canada) Erin McLeod	1	0	0
Total				4	2	6

=== Disciplinary record ===
As of match played October 29, 2021

No.	Pos.	Name	NWSL		Cup		Total	
No.	Pos.	Name	Booked	Sent off (straight red)	Booked	Sent off (straight red)	Booked	Sent off (straight red)
2	FW	(United States) Sydney Leroux	1	0	0	0	1	0
4	DF	(England) Amy Turner	4	0	0	0	4	0
7	DF	(New Zealand) Ali Riley	2	0	1	0	3	0
8	MF	(Iceland) Gunnhildur Jónsdóttir	3	0	0	0	3	0
9	FW	(England) Jodie Taylor	3	0	0	0	3	0
10	FW	(Brazil) Marta	2	0	1	0	3	0
11	DF	(United States) Ali Krieger	2	0	0	0	2	0
13	FW	(United States) Alex Morgan	1	0	0	0	1	0
14	MF	(United States) Marisa Viggiano	3	0	0	0	3	0
15	MF	(United States) Erika Tymrak	1	0	0	0	1	0
17	DF	(United States) Courtney Petersen	2	0	0	0	2	0
21	DF	(United States) Phoebe McClernon	3	0	0	0	3	0
22	MF	(United States) Taylor Kornieck	1	0	1	0	2	0
23	DF	(United States) Kylie Strom	3	0	0	0	3	0
24	GK	(United States) Ashlyn Harris	1	0	1	0	2	0
25	DF	(Jamaica) Konya Plummer	0	0	1	0	1	0
28	MF	(United States) Meggie Dougherty Howard	5	0	0	0	5	0
Total			36	0	5	0	41	0

== Transfers and loans ==
=== 2021 NWSL Draft ===
Draft picks are not automatically signed to the team roster. The 2021 college draft was held on January 13, 2021. Orlando had four selections. All four draftees elected to take up the NCAA waiver in light of the COVID-19 pandemic that meant they were able to remain in college to contest the rescheduled college spring season. The Pride retained the NWSL rights to all four. At the end of the college season, Kaylie Collins signed a National Team Replacement contract on June 4, and Viviana Villacorta was signed to a one-year plus option year contract and immediately placed on the season-ending disabled list on August 6. Mikayla Colohan and Kerry Abello both announced they would return to their respective colleges for the 2021 season and exhaust their final year of eligibility.

Round	Pick	Player	Pos.	College	Status
1	9	(United States) Viviana Villacorta	MF	University of California, Los Angeles	Signed
2	14	(United States) Mikayla Colohan	MF	(Utah) Brigham Young University	NCAA returnee
3	24	(United States) Kerry Abello	DF	Pennsylvania State University	NCAA returnee
4	34	(United States) Kaylie Collins	GK	University of Southern California	Signed (Note: Initially signed National Team Replacement contract, later signed through 2021 season)

=== Transfers in ===
Date	Player	Pos.	Previous club	Fee/notes	Ref.
December 21, 2020	(United States) Alex Morgan	FW	(England) Tottenham Hotspur	Federation player, returned to the league	
December 24, 2020	(United States) Meggie Dougherty Howard	MF	(United States) Washington Spirit	Acquired in a trade with a first-round pick in the 2021 NWSL Draft, a first-round pick in the 2022 or 2023 draft (tbd) and $140,000 in allocation money in exchange for Emily Sonnett.	
January 22, 2021	(United States) Phoebe McClernon	DF	(Sweden) Växjö DFF	Re-signed following short-term contract with Växjö	
January 30, 2021	(Iceland) Gunnhildur Jónsdóttir	MF	(United States) Kansas City NWSL	Acquired in exchange for Kristen Edmonds and the natural second-round pick in the 2022 NWSL Draft.	
January 30, 2021	(United States) Erika Tymrak	MF	(United States) Kansas City NWSL	Acquired in exchange for Kristen Edmonds and the natural second-round pick in the 2022 NWSL Draft.	
February 23, 2021	(United States) Crystal Thomas	FW	(United States) Washington Spirit	Free agent signing	
March 2, 2021	(United States) Abi Kim	FW	(Italy) Fiorentina		
April 5, 2021	(United States) Gabby English	GK	(Portugal) Boavista	National Team Replacement signing	
June 25, 2021	(England) Amy Turner	DF	(England) Manchester United	Signed using allocation money	
July 5, 2021	(United States) Kylie Strom	DF	(Spain) Atlético Madrid	Free agent signing	
July 8, 2021	(England) Jodie Taylor	FW	(France) Olympique Lyon	Free agent signing, acquired playing rights in exchange for Carson Pickett in February 2021	
August 26, 2021	(United States) Parker Roberts	MF	(United States) Florida Gators	Free agent signing, acquired discovery rights from Kansas City NWSL in exchange for the natural fourth-round pick in the 2022 NWSL Draft	
October 7, 2021	(Australia) Emily van Egmond	MF	(England) West Ham United	Free agent signing	

=== Transfers out ===
Date	Player	Pos.	Destination club	Fee/notes	Ref.
October 29, 2020	(United States) Julie King	DF		Waived	
October 29, 2020	(United States) Morgan Reid	DF		Waived	
October 29, 2020	(United States) Abby Elinsky	MF		Waived	
October 30, 2020	(Belgium) Zandy Soree	MF	(United States) Houston Dash	Short-term contract expired	
October 30, 2020	(Jamaica) Deneisha Blackwood	MF	(United States) Houston Dash	Short-term contract expired	
October 30, 2020	(United States) Savanah Uveges	MF	(Germany) MSV Duisburg	Short-term contract expired	
October 30, 2020	(United States) Kate Howarth	FW		Short-term contract expired	
November 12, 2020	(Australia) Alanna Kennedy	DF	(United States) Racing Louisville	Selected in the 2020 NWSL Expansion Draft.	
December 24, 2020	(United States) Emily Sonnett	DF	(United States) Washington Spirit	Traded in exchange for a first-round pick in the 2021 NWSL Draft, a first-round pick in the 2023 NWSL Draft, Meggie Dougherty Howard and $140,000 in allocation money.	
December 31, 2020	(Scotland) Claire Emslie	FW	(England) Everton	Permanent transfer	
December 31, 2020	(Brazil) Camila	MF	(Brazil) Palmeiras	Out of contract	
January 7, 2021	(Canada) Shelina Zadorsky	DF	(England) Tottenham Hotspur	Permanent transfer	
January 8, 2021	(Australia) Emily van Egmond	MF	(England) West Ham United	Permanent transfer	
January 30, 2021	(United States) Kristen Edmonds	MF	(United States) Kansas City NWSL	Traded with the natural second-round pick in the 2022 NWSL Draft in exchange for Gunnhildur Jónsdóttir and Erika Tymrak.	
February 4, 2021	(United States) Carson Pickett	DF	(United States) North Carolina Courage	Traded in exchange for the playing rights to Jodie Taylor.	
March 30, 2021	(Canada) Jordyn Listro	MF	(United States) Kansas City NWSL	Traded in exchange for a third-round pick in the 2022 NWSL Draft.	
April 14, 2021	(United States) Gabby English	GK	(Scotland) Hibernian	End of National Team Replacement contract	

=== Loans out ===
Date	Player	Pos.	Loaned to	Notes	Ref.
August 17, 2021	(Jamaica) Konya Plummer	DF	(Sweden) AIK	Until November 15, 2021	

=== Preseason trialists ===
Orlando Pride began preseason training on February 1, 2021. The squad included two non-roster invitees on trial with the team during preseason. Haran had been with Orlando during the 2020 Fall Series and made two appearances. Tymrak was not yet contracted and rostered having come out of retirement when Orlando acquired her playing rights in a trade in January. They were later joined by Gabby English who had most recently been in Portugal with Boavista and Jamaican international Lauren Silver who had spent the 2020 Fall Series signed to Houston Dash.

2021 Orlando Pride trialists
Player	Position	Previous team
(Canada) Ally Haran	DF	(United States) Orlando Pride
(United States) Erika Tymrak	MF	(United States) Utah Royals
(United States) Gabby English	GK	(Portugal) Boavista
(Jamaica) Lauren Silver	DF	(United States) Houston Dash

Signed to first team contract.
Signed as National Team Replacement player.
