= Darian Jenkins =

American soccer player (born 1995)

Personal information
- Full name: Darian Michelle Jenkins
- Date of birth: January 5, 1995 (age 31)
- Place of birth: Murray, Utah, U.S.
- Height: 5 ft 10 in (1.78 m)
- Position: Forward

Youth career
- 2007–2012: Sparta United

College career
| Years | Team | Apps | (Gls) |
| 2013–2016 | UCLA Bruins | 76 | (29) |

Senior career*
| Years | Team | Apps | (Gls) |
| 2015–2016 | SoCal FC | | |
| 2017–2018 | North Carolina Courage | 13 | (0) |
| 2019–2020 | OL Reign | 17 | (4) |
| 2019–2020 | → Melbourne Victory (loan) | 12 | (5) |
| 2020–2021 | → Bordeaux (loan) | 5 | (0) |
| 2021 | Kansas City Current | 22 | (3) |
| 2022 | Orlando Pride | 17 | (2) |
| Total | | 86 | (14) |

International career
| 2011–2012 | United States U17 | 5 | (2) |
| 2014 | United States U18 | | |
| 2013–2015 | United States U20 | | |
| 2017–2018 | United States U23 | 1 | (0) |
- * Club domestic league appearances and goals

Darian Michelle Jenkins (born January 5, 1995) is an American retired professional soccer player who played as a forward.

Having played college soccer for the UCLA Bruins, Jenkins won the 2013 National Championship and was selected seventh overall in the 2017 NWSL College Draft. She played professionally for North Carolina Courage, OL Reign and Kansas City Current in the NWSL as well as Melbourne Victory of the Australian W-League and French Division 1 Féminine team Bordeaux. Internationally she represented the United States at under-17, under-18, under-20 and under-23 level.

== Early life ==
Growing up in Riverton, Utah, Jenkins started playing in a rec league at the age of 10 before joining a competitive squad as an 11-year-old and immersed herself in training, first earning the attention of the U.S. Youth National Team through the I.D. camp program as a U14 in 2009. At Riverton High School, Jenkins was an All-Region and All-State honoree. She was also a high school track & field athlete, running sprints. Playing club soccer for Sparta United, she won the Utah State Cup in 2012.

=== College career ===
Jenkins played college soccer at the University of California, Los Angeles while majoring in American Literature & Culture. She was a four-year starter for the UCLA Bruins, scoring 29 goals and 12 assists in 76 appearances. As a freshman in 2013, Jenkins was one of two Bruin players to start all 26 games and led UCLA in scoring with 11 goals. Helping the Bruins go unbeaten in conference play to capture their first Pac-12 Championship since 2008, she was named Pac-12 Freshman of the Year and earned first-team All-Pac-12 honors before also helping the team capture the 2013 National Championship title. Ahead of her 2016 senior season, Jenkins was named as a co-captain. In the 2016 season opener, Jenkins scored a first half hat-trick against San Diego State Aztecs, the first Bruin to score a hat-trick since Sydney Leroux in 2011. Leading the Pac-12 with seven goals at the time, Jenkins suffered a broken fibula against Oregon Ducks on October 2, 2016, ending her collegiate career.

While at college, Jenkins also played in the Women's Premier Soccer League with SoCal FC in 2015 and 2016. In 2015, SoCal FC won the Pacific-South division and reached the championship final before losing to Chicago Red Stars Reserves 2–1.

== Club career ==
=== North Carolina Courage, 2017–2018 ===
On January 12, 2017, Jenkins was drafted in the first round (7th overall) of the 2017 NWSL College Draft by North Carolina Courage. She signed with the Courage on April 10 and was immediately placed on the 45-day disabled list while she continued to recover from the broken leg suffered in college. She was ultimately not added to the active roster during the 2017 season as she continued to rehab.

On March 24, 2018, Jenkins made her Courage debut as a 67th-minute substitute in the season opener against Portland Thorns. She made a total of 14 appearances for the Courage in 2018, all as a substitute, but did not score. She was a stoppage-time substitute in the 2018 NWSL Championship final as the Courage beat Portland Thorns 3–0.

=== OL Reign, 2019–2020 ===
On December 17, 2018, Jenkins was traded to Reign FC in exchange for the 9th overall pick in the 2019 NWSL College Draft. She made her debut for the club as a starter in the season opener on April 14, 2019, and scored her first senior professional goal in the game as Reign drew 1–1 with Houston Dash. She made a total of 18 appearances in 2019, finished third on the team in goals with four.

In the NWSL offseason, Jenkins joined Australian W-League team Melbourne Victory on loan for the 2019–20 W-League season. She started all 12 games and scored five goals as Melbourne Victory finished second in the regular season before losing to Sydney FC in the playoff semi-finals. She was named to the Team of the Season.

With the 2020 NWSL season disrupted by the COVID-19 pandemic, Jenkins made five appearances for the newly rebranded OL Reign during the 2020 NWSL Challenge Cup before missing the four-game friendly Fall Series to join French Division 1 Féminine side Bordeaux on loan until February 2021.

=== Kansas City Current, 2021 ===
On January 4, 2021, Jenkins was traded to the Kansas City NWSL team (later rebranded Kansas City Current) along with the rights to Meg Brandt and the 38th pick in the 2021 NWSL Draft in exchange for Tziarra King and a second-round pick in 2022 NWSL Draft. She made 23 appearances in all competitions and tied for the team-lead in goals with three as Kansas City finished bottom of the NWSL.

=== Orlando Pride, 2022 ===
On January 11, 2022, Jenkins was acquired by Orlando Pride in exchange for $75,000 in allocation money and Orlando's natural second-round pick in the 2023 NWSL Draft. The move reunited Jenkins with her UCLA head coach Amanda Cromwell who had been appointed Pride head coach the previous month. Jenkins announced her retirement from professional soccer on January 18, 2023.

== International ==
In May 2012, Jenkins represented the United States under-17 at the 2012 CONCACAF Women's U-17 Championship, making two appearances and scoring in the 7–0 semi-final win over Panama. The United States won the tournament and qualified for the 2012 FIFA U-17 Women's World Cup in Azerbaijan. Jenkins was again named to the squad and played the entirety of all three group games, scoring in a 1–1 draw with North Korea as the United States finished level on points with North Korea and France but was eliminated on goal difference tiebreaker. In 2014, Jenkins was a starter for the United States under-18 team at the 10 Nations Tournament. Jenkins was frequently called up to United States under-20 training camps and squads during the cycle for the 2014 FIFA U-20 Women's World Cup and was named to the final camp prior to the tournament but did not make the final roster. In August 2018, Jenkins appeared for the United States under-23 team at the Nordic Tournament.

== Career statistics ==
=== College ===
| School | Season | Division | Apps | Goals |
|---|---|---|---|---|
| UCLA Bruins | 2013 | Div. I | 26 | 11 |
| UCLA Bruins | 2014 | Div. I | 21 | 6 |
| UCLA Bruins | 2015 | Div. I | 18 | 5 |
| UCLA Bruins | 2016 | Div. I | 11 | 7 |
| Career total | | | 76 | 29 |

=== Club ===
As of October 1, 2022.

| Club | Season | League | | | Playoffs (Note: NWSL Playoffs and W-League Finals) | | Cup (Note: NWSL Challenge Cup) | | Total | |
| Club | Season | Division | Apps | Goals | Apps | Goals | Apps | Goals | Apps | Goals |
|---|---|---|---|---|---|---|---|---|---|---|
| North Carolina Courage | 2017 | NWSL | 0 | 0 | 0 | 0 | — | | 0 | 0 |
| North Carolina Courage | 2018 | NWSL | 13 | 0 | 1 | 0 | — | | 14 | 0 |
| North Carolina Courage | Total | | 13 | 0 | 1 | 0 | 0 | 0 | 14 | 0 |
| OL Reign | 2019 | NWSL | 17 | 4 | 1 | 0 | — | | 18 | 4 |
| OL Reign | 2020 | NWSL | — | | — | | 5 | 0 | 5 | 0 |
| OL Reign | Total | | 17 | 4 | 1 | 0 | 5 | 0 | 23 | 4 |
| Melbourne Victory (loan) | 2019–20 | W-League | 12 | 5 | 1 | 0 | — | | 13 | 5 |
| Bordeaux (loan) | 2020–21 | D1 Féminine | 5 | 0 | — | | 0 | 0 | 5 | 0 |
| Kansas City Current | 2021 | NWSL | 22 | 3 | — | | 1 | 0 | 23 | 3 |
| Orlando Pride | 2022 | NWSL | 17 | 2 | — | | 6 | 2 | 23 | 4 |
| Career total | | | 86 | 14 | 3 | 0 | 12 | 2 | 101 | 16 |

== Honors ==
UCLA Bruins

- Pac-12 Conference regular season: 2013, 2014
- NCAA Division I Women's Soccer Championship: 2013

North Carolina Courage

- NWSL Championship: 2018
- NWSL Shield: 2017, 2018

International

- CONCACAF Women's U-17 Championship: 2012

Individual

- Pac-12 Conference Freshman of the Year: 2013
- PFA W-League Team of the Season: 2019–20
