= Amber Marshall (soccer) =

American soccer player

Personal information
- Date of birth: January 24, 1999 (age 27)
- Place of birth: Utah, United States
- Height: 5 ft 7 in (1.70 m)
- Position: Midfielder

College career
Years	Team	Apps	(Gls)
2017–2020	Utah State Aggies	55	(2)

Senior career*
Years	Team	Apps	(Gls)
2019	Utah Royals FC Reserves		
2021	Houston Dash	0	(0)

Managerial career
- 2022: Utah State Aggies (assistant)
- 2023–: Pepperdine Waves (assistant)
- * Club domestic league appearances and goals as of April 10, 2021

Amber Marshall (born January 24, 1999) is an American former professional soccer player who is currently an assistant coach for the Pepperdine Waves. A midfielder in her playing career, she played college soccer for the Utah State Aggies before spending time professionally with the Utah Royals FC Reserves and the Houston Dash of the National Women's Soccer League (NWSL).

== Club career ==
In March 2021, Marshall signed a one-year contract with Houston Dash in the NWSL ahead of the 2021 NWSL Challenge Cup and 2021 season. She made her debut on April 9, 2021, during a 0–0 draw against the Chicago Red Stars in the Challenge Cup.

== Coaching career ==
Marshall returned to Utah State in 2021, serving as Director of Operations and Player Development for two seasons. In 2022, she shifted roles to one of the team's assistant coaches. In January 2023, Marshall joined the Pepperdine Waves as an assistant coach.
