= Kaylie Collins =

American soccer player (born 1998)

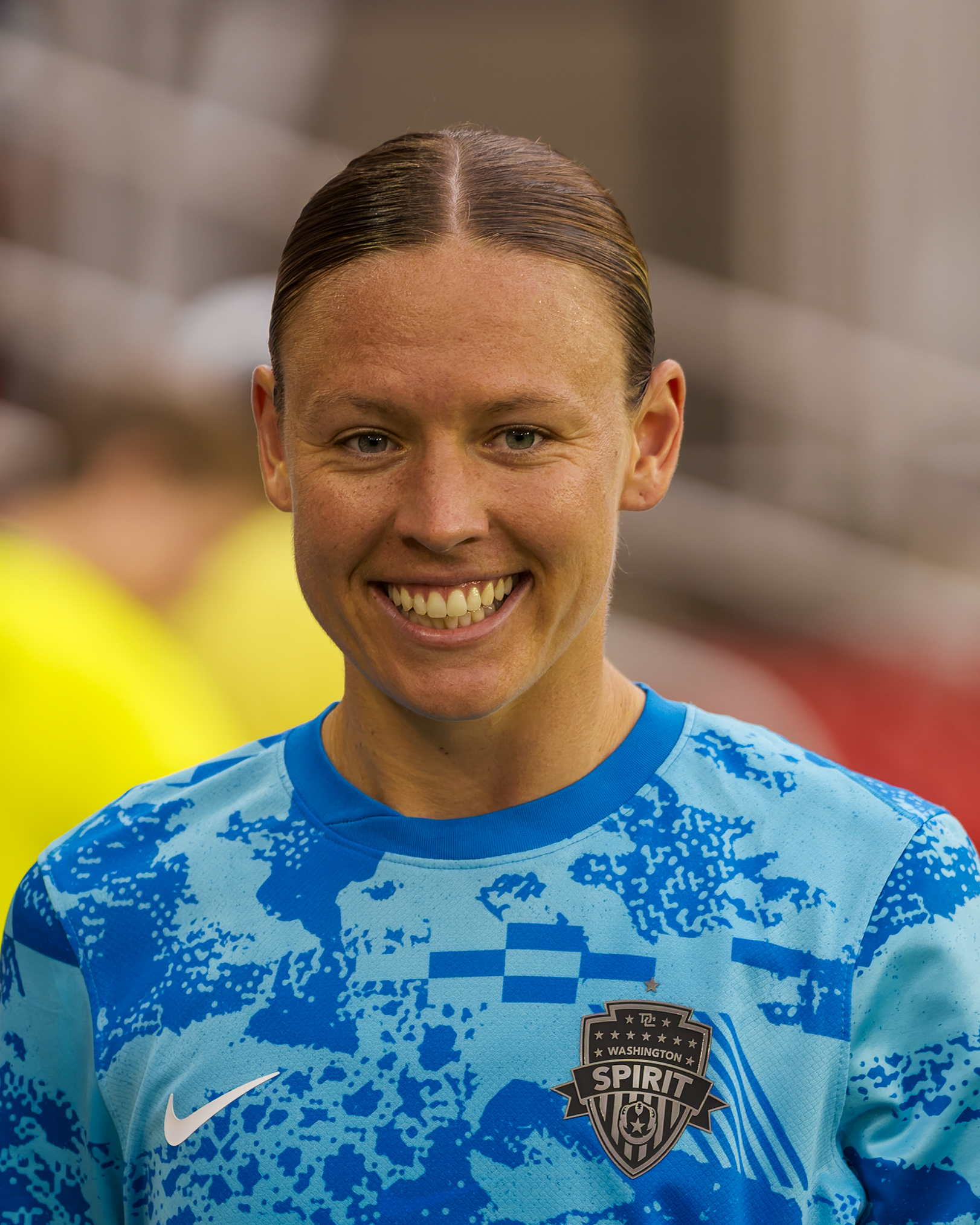
- Collins with the Washington Spirit in 2026

Personal information
- Full name: Kaylie Ann Collins
- Date of birth: May 17, 1998 (age 28)
- Place of birth: Clayton, California, United States
- Height: 5 ft 10 in (1.78 m)
- Position: Goalkeeper

Team information
- Current team: Washington Spirit
- Number: 31

Youth career
- 2008–2011: Diablo FC
- 2012–2016: Mustang SC

College career
Years	Team	Apps	(Gls)
2016–2021	USC Trojans	66	(0)

Senior career*
Years	Team	Apps	(Gls)
2018	SoCal FC		
2019	FC Golden State	1	(0)
2021–2024	Orlando Pride	1	(0)
2023–2024	→ Western Sydney Wanderers (loan)	11	(0)
2024	Seattle Reign FC	0	(0)
2024–	Washington Spirit	0	(0)

International career
2012	United States U14		
2013	United States U15		
- * Club domestic league appearances and goals as of July 18, 2024

Kaylie Ann Collins (born May 17, 1998) is an American professional soccer player who plays as a goalkeeper for the Washington Spirit of the National Women's Soccer League (NWSL). She played college soccer for the USC Trojans and was drafted by the Orlando Pride in the fourth round of the 2021 NWSL Draft.

== Early life ==
Born in Clayton, California, Collins was a four-year starting varsity goalkeeper and captain at Carondelet High School and was named to the TopDrawerSoccer.com high school All-American first team in 2016. She played club soccer with Diablo FC and Mustang SC, reaching the National Championship semifinals and Surf Cup final in 2014, and was a Region IV Olympic Development Program member.

=== USC Trojans ===
Collins played four seasons of college soccer at the University of Southern California between 2016 and 2021 while also studying as a communications major before completing a master's degree in applied psychology. After redshirting as a true freshman behind Sammy Jo Prudhomme in 2016, Collins made 19 appearances for the USC Trojans in her redshirt freshman year in 2017 and was named to the Pac-12 All-Freshman Team. Also in 2017, Collins was made the team's culture committee leader in charge of creating an enjoyable and welcoming team atmosphere. Head coach Keidane McAlpine singled out Collins for her energy and amiability. As a sophomore in 2018, Collins started all 22 of USC's games, conceding 11 goals and posting an 86.1% save rate to earn Pac-12 Goalkeeper of the Year, All-Pac-12 first team, All-Region first team, United Soccer Coaches All-America second team and TopDrawerSoccer.com Best XI second team honors. Her ten solo-shutouts tied her for the fourth best single-season total in program history. After missing 11 games early in the season with an injury, Collins made 11 appearances in 2019 as the Trojans reached the NCAA College Cup quarterfinals for only the third time. She elected to delay her pro career and return in 2021 to contest her senior season despite being drafted in January following the NCAA's offer of a waiver in light of the COVID-19 pandemic that meant draftees were able to remain in college to contest the rescheduled 2020 college spring season. Collins played in 13 of the 14 games in her final season at USC.

In the 2018 and 2019 offseasons, Collins joined WPSL sides SoCal FC and FC Golden State.

== Club career ==
=== Orlando Pride ===
On January 13, 2021, Collins was selected in the fourth round (34th overall) of the 2021 NWSL Draft by Orlando Pride, the second of two goalkeepers drafted in 2021 behind Sydney Schneider. After finishing out the delayed college spring season with USC, Collins signed a short-term national team replacement contract with Orlando on June 4 to cover for Erin McLeod who was on international duty for Canada but did not make an appearance as a rookie. Ahead of the 2022 season, Collins signed a two-year contract with the club. She made her professional debut on April 23, 2022. With McLeod injured, Collins sat behind offseason recruit Anna Moorhouse for three games before starting the final match of the 2022 NWSL Challenge Cup with Orlando already guaranteed to finish last in their group. She made four saves, only allowing one goal on a penalty kick as Orlando drew 1–1 with Gotham FC at Red Bull Arena. Following the conclusion of her loan spell with Western Sydney Wanderers in April 2024, Collins was waived by Orlando Pride.

==== Loan to Western Sydney Wanderers ====
In September 2023, Collins was loaned to Australian club Western Sydney Wanderers for the 2023–24 A-League Women season. In total she made 11 appearances, kept three shutouts, and conceded 17 goals as Western Sydney finished in 7th-place and missed out on the postseason on goal difference.

=== Seattle Reign ===
On April 20, 2024, Collins signed with Seattle Reign FC as a short-term replacement player following injury to Claudia Dickey. She was third choice behind Laurel Ivory and Maia Pérez, and was never named to a matchday squad.

=== Washington Spirit ===
On July 18, 2024, Collins was signed as a National Team Replacement player by Washington Spirit ahead of the 2024 NWSL x Liga MX Femenil Summer Cup.

== International career ==
Collins was selected for the United States at under-14 and under-15 levels.

== Career statistics ==
=== College summary ===
Team	Season	Total		
Team	Season	Division	Apps	Goals
USC Trojans	2016	Div. I	0	0
USC Trojans	2017	Div. I	19	0
USC Trojans	2018	Div. I	22	0
USC Trojans	2019	Div. I	12	0
USC Trojans	2020–21	Div. I	13	0
Total			66	0

=== Club summary ===
As of April 16, 2024

Club	Season	League			Cup		Playoffs		Total	
Club	Season	Division	Apps	Goals	Apps	Goals	Apps	Goals	Apps	Goals
Orlando Pride	2021	NWSL	0	0	0	0	—		0	0
Orlando Pride	2022	NWSL	0	0	1	0	—		1	0
Orlando Pride	2023	NWSL	1	0	1	0	—		2	0
Orlando Pride	Total		1	0	2	0	0	0	3	0
Western Sydney Wanderers (loan)	2023–24	A-League	11	0	—		—		11	0
Career total			12	0	2	0	0	0	14	0

== Honors ==
USC Trojans

- NCAA Division I Women's Soccer Championship: 2016

Washington Spirit

- NWSL Challenge Cup: 2025

Individual

- Pac-12 Conference Goalkeeper of the Year: 2018
