= Viviana Villacorta =

American soccer player (born 1999)

Personal information
- Full name: Viviana Venezia Villacorta
- Date of birth: February 2, 1999 (age 27)
- Place of birth: Torrance, California, United States
- Height: 5 ft 7 in (1.70 m)
- Position: Midfielder

College career
Years	Team	Apps	(Gls)
2017–2021	UCLA Bruins	72	(7)

Senior career*
Years	Team	Apps	(Gls)
2016–2019	Santa Clarita Blue Heat		
2021–2026	Orlando Pride	41	(0)

International career^{‡}
2016	United States U18		
2017	United States U19		
2017–2018	United States U20	17	(6)
- * Club domestic league appearances and goals as of 03:29, November 8, 2026 (UTC) ‡ National team caps and goals as of August 13, 2018

Viviana Venezia Villacorta (born February 2, 1999) is an American professional soccer player who plays as a midfielder. She played college soccer for the UCLA Bruins before being selected by the Orlando Pride in the first round of the 2021 NWSL Draft. She won the NWSL Shield and NWSL Championship with the Pride in 2024.

== Early life ==
Born in Torrance, California, Villacorta played four years of soccer at Mira Costa High School and earned Bay League first-team honors three times. She won the USYS National Championships in 2015 and 2016 with Cal South ODP teams. Villacorta played four years of club soccer with United Women's Soccer team Santa Clarita Blue Heat, winning the National Championship title in the inaugural 2016 season as well as back to back West conference titles.

== College career ==
Villacorta played four seasons of college soccer at University of California, Los Angeles between 2017 and 2021 while also earning a degree in sociology. As a freshman she played in all 25 games including 15 starts. The team finished second in the Pac-12 conference behind Stanford and qualified for the postseason, reaching the final of the 2017 College Cup before again losing out to their conference rivals. In 2018, Villacorta played in all 22 games, starting all but the season opener, and earned second-team All-Pac-12 honors. She scored four goals in total with her first collegiate career goal coming away at Stanford in a 3–2 defeat. UCLA again finished second in conference play and reached the quarterfinals of the NCAA Tournament before being eliminated by North Carolina in a penalty shootout.

In 2019, Villacorta was an ever-present factor, starting in all 24 games. She scored three goals as well as a career-high eight assists, earning second-team All-Pac-12 honors for a second consecutive season as UCLA again finished second behind Stanford and reached the semifinals of the postseason, losing 4–1 to Stanford. Villacorta elected to delay her pro career and return in 2021 to contest her senior season despite being drafted in January following the NCAA's offer of a waiver in light of the COVID-19 pandemic that meant draftees were able to remain in college to contest the rescheduled college spring season. Having never missed a game for UCLA since joining as a freshman in 2017, Villacorta suffered an ACL tear 18 minutes into the opening game against Pepperdine on February 7, ending her collegiate career prematurely.

== Club career ==
On January 13, 2021, Villacorta was selected in the first round (9th overall) of the 2021 NWSL Draft by Orlando Pride and had originally planned to join the team following the delayed college spring season. After suffering an ACL tear during a college game in February, Villacorta signed a one-year plus option year contract with Orlando on August 6, 2021, and immediately placed on the season-ending injury list.

Villacorta did not feature during the 2022 NWSL Challenge Cup, but was named as a substitute in a matchday squad for the first time in the final game on April 23, 2022. She made her professional debut in the next game, as a 72nd-minute substitute in the team's regular season opener, a 3–0 defeat to NJ/NY Gotham FC.

On July 16, 2024, while out with a season-ending injury, she renewed her contract through 2025 with an option for an additional season. She returned to play later that year and participated in 4 matches as Orlando won the NWSL Shield and NWSL Championship. In June 2025, she agreed with the Pride to exercise her contract option for 2026. She departed from the club at the end of 2026 after having made 41 appearances in the NWSL regular season.

== International career ==
As well as the United States, Villacorta is eligible to represent Peru and El Salvador internationally through her parents.

She has represented the United States at under-18, under-19 and under-20 level. In January 2018, Villacorta was named to the squad for the 2018 CONCACAF Women's U-20 Championship, making four appearances as the United States finished as runners-up to Mexico. In August she was part of the squad at the 2018 FIFA U-20 Women's World Cup held in France, starting all three group stage games as the team failed to progress after finishing third behind Spain and Japan. In 2019, Villacorta was selected to represent the United States at the 2019 Summer Universiade.

== Personal life ==
Villacorta's father, Julio, won a state championship with El Camino College's soccer team. She has two older sisters, Vanessa and Veronica, who both played college soccer at UC Merced. Her partner is former Orlando Pride teammate Anna Moorhouse. They have a dog called Betty.

== Career statistics ==
=== College summary ===
Team	Season	Pac-12 regular season			NCAA Tournament		Total	
Team	Season	Division	Apps	Goals	Apps	Goals	Apps	Goals
UCLA Bruins	2017	Div. I	19	0	6	0	25	0
UCLA Bruins	2018	Div. I	18	3	4	1	22	4
UCLA Bruins	2019	Div. I	19	2	5	1	24	3
UCLA Bruins	2020–21	Div. I	1	0	—		1	0
Total			57	5	15	2	72	7

=== Club summary ===
As of March 14, 2025

Club	Season	League			Cup (Note: Includes the NWSL Challenge Cup)		Playoffs (Note: Includes NWSL playoffs)		Total	
Club	Season	Division	Apps	Goals	Apps	Goals	Apps	Goals	Apps	Goals
Orlando Pride	2021	NWSL	0	0	0	0	—		0	0
Orlando Pride	2022	NWSL	15	0	0	0	—		15	0
Orlando Pride	2023	NWSL	16	0	5	0	—		21	0
Orlando Pride	2024	NWSL	3	0	—		1	0	4	0
Orlando Pride	2025	NWSL	1	0	0	0	—		1	0
Career total			35	0	5	0	1	0	41	0

== Honors ==
Santa Clarita Blue Heat

- UWS National Championship: 2016

UCLA Bruins

- NCAA College Cup runner-up: 2017

Orlando Pride

- NWSL Shield: 2024
- NWSL Championship: 2024
