= Phoebe McClernon =

American soccer player (born 1997)

- McClernon with the Seattle Reign in 2026

Personal information
- Full name: Phoebe Lynch McClernon
- Date of birth: December 13, 1997 (age 28)
- Place of birth: West Chester, Pennsylvania, United States
- Height: 5 ft 7 in (1.70 m)
- Position: Center back

Team information
- Current team: Seattle Reign
- Number: 21

Youth career
- Penn Fusion

College career
Years	Team	Apps	(Gls)
2016–2019	Virginia Cavaliers	88	(1)

Senior career*
Years	Team	Apps	(Gls)
2020	Orlando Pride	0	(0)
2020	Växjö	12	(0)
2021	Orlando Pride	21	(0)
2022–	Seattle Reign	100	(0)

International career
2017–2018	United States U23		
- * Club domestic league appearances and goals as of 16:35, November 8, 2026 (UTC)

McClernon with the Seattle Reign in 2026

Phoebe Lynch McClernon (born December 13, 1997) is an American professional soccer player who plays as a center back for Seattle Reign FC of the National Women's Soccer League (NWSL). She played college soccer for the Virginia Cavaliers and was drafted by the Orlando Pride in the second round of the 2020 NWSL College Draft.

== Early life ==
A native of West Chester, Pennsylvania, McClernon captained her high school team at Academy of Notre Dame de Namur, played club soccer for Penn Fusion Academy and was a member of the Region I Olympic Development Program.

=== Virginia Cavaliers ===
McClernon played college soccer at the University of Virginia. She played four seasons for the Virginia Cavaliers between 2016 and 2019, playing in all 22 games as a freshman but only starting four. She became a starter in her sophomore year and earned All-ACC honors in each of the following three seasons. In 2019, McClernon was part of a UVA backline that posted a stretch of seven consecutive shutouts in ACC play.

== Club career ==
=== Orlando Pride ===
McClernon was selected in the second round (14th overall) of the 2020 NWSL College Draft by Orlando Pride. With preseason and the ensuing NWSL schedule canceled due to the COVID-19 pandemic, McClernon was eventually signed to a short-term contract for the return to play 2020 NWSL Challenge Cup on June 21, 2020. However, the following day the team confirmed they would be withdrawing from the tournament following multiple positive COVID-19 tests among both players and staff.

=== Växjö ===
In August 2020, having been unable to play for Orlando, McClernon was released from her short-term contract in order to join Swedish Damallsvenskan club Växjö for the rest of the season. She made her debut on August 16, 2020, playing the first half of a 2–0 defeat to Vittsjö. In total McClernon made 12 league appearances as Växjö finished in sixth-place in 2020.

=== Return to Orlando Pride ===
On January 22, 2021, McClernon re-signed with Orlando Pride on a two-year contract ahead of the 2021 season. She made her NWSL debut for the club on April 10, 2021, starting in the team's Challenge Cup opener against Racing Louisville. McClernon's early regular season performances were recognized with NWSL Team of the Month honors for May 2021, having started in all four of Orlando Pride's games as the team went unbeaten and finished the month at the top of the table.

=== Seattle Reign ===
On December 18, 2021, McClernon was traded during the 2022 NWSL Draft to OL Reign in exchange for the 10th overall pick (used to selected Caitlin Cosme), Celia, Leah Pruitt, and a second-round pick in the 2023 NWSL Draft. Over the course of the 2022 National Women's Soccer League season, McClernon made 11 appearances for the club across the regular season and in the playoffs. She also played in two matches of the 2022 NWSL Challenge Cup.

McClernon missed the start of the 2023 National Women's Soccer League season due to a back injury, eventually playing her first game of the season on July 6 against Racing Louisville FC. Following her return, the defender started eight of the final nine fixtures of the regular season and found herself on the pitch for all four playoff games for a total of 974 minutes. She recorded her first assist in a Reign shirt on October 20, 2023, playing the ball to Veronica Latsko for the game winner in the 87th minute of the NWSL playoff quarterfinals against Angel City FC. McClernon featured in all 90 minutes of the Reign's 1-2 loss against NJ/NY Gotham FC in the NWSL Championship final.

As of the match on August 25, 2024 against North Carolina Courage, McClernon has started 15 of the 17 regular season games and provided a second assist as a Reign player, again to Veronica Latsko in a 3-2 defeat against Washington Spirit on May 24.

== International career ==
McClernon has been called up to multiple United States under-23 training camps. In March 2018, she appeared in all three games for the under-23 team that competed at the Portland Thorns Invitational.

== Career statistics ==
=== College ===
School	Season	Division	Apps	Goals
Virginia Cavaliers	2016	Div. I	22	0
Virginia Cavaliers	2017	Div. I	23	1
Virginia Cavaliers	2018	Div. I	22	0
Virginia Cavaliers	2019	Div. I	21	0
Career total			88	1

=== Club ===
As of match played November 2nd, 2024.

Club	Season	League			Cup (Note: Includes Svenska Cupen and NWSL Challenge Cup and NWSL x Liga MX Femenil Summer Cup)		Playoffs		Total	
Club	Season	Division	Apps	Goals	Apps	Goals	Apps	Goals	Apps	Goals
Växjö	2020	Damallsvenskan	12	0	1	0	—		13	0
Orlando Pride	2021	NWSL	21	0	4	0	—		25	0
Seattle Reign FC	2022	NWSL	10	0	2	0	1	0	13	0
Seattle Reign FC	2023	NWSL	9	0	4	0	3	0	16	0
Seattle Reign FC	2024	NWSL	26	0	2	0	—		28	0
Career total			69	0	13	0	4	0	95	0

== Honors ==
with OL Reign

- NWSL Shield: 2022
- The Women's Cup: 2022
