= 2021 NWSL Draft =

Soccer draft

General information
- Sport: Soccer
- Date: January 13, 2021
- Time: 7:00 PM ET
- Network: Twitch

Overview
- 40 total selections in 4 rounds
- League: National Women's Soccer League
- First selection: Emily Fox, Racing Louisville FC
- Most selections: Kansas City NWSL and Racing Louisville FC (6 picks)
- Fewest selections: OL Reign (1 pick)

The 2021 NWSL Draft was the ninth annual meeting of National Women's Soccer League (NWSL) franchises to select eligible college players. It was held on January 13, 2021. Due to the COVID-19 pandemic, it was the first NWSL Draft to be held virtually via videoconferencing and web streaming.

== Format ==
- All 10 teams of the National Women's Soccer League (NWSL) take turns making their selections over four rounds, with 10 picks per round. Draft order in each round was determined by the reverse order of standings after the preliminary stage of the 2020 NWSL Challenge Cup, with the exceptions being Racing Louisville FC taking the first selection as an expansion team and Orlando Pride slotting into the fourth spot as decided by the board of governors after the team was unable to participate in the Challenge Cup.
- The Kansas City expansion team took over all player-related assets (including draft picks) of defunct team Utah Royals FC.
- The draft was broadcast live via the NWSL's official Twitch channel.
- Final list of players who registered was released on January 12, 2021.

=== COVID-19 pandemic ===
Due to the COVID-19 pandemic, the NWSL made the following changes to the draft regulations that apply only to the 2021 NWSL Draft:

- Due to the disruption of college soccer and resulting NCAA D-I spring season in 2021, the NWSL applied for and received a waiver from the NCAA so that D-I players who are drafted could choose to report immediately for the 2021 NWSL season and forfeit their remaining collegiate eligibility, or remain with their collegiate teams until the conclusion of the NCAA D-I spring season in May 2021.
- The NWSL waived registration requirements so that all D-I players who had exhausted three years of collegiate soccer eligibility prior to the 2020–21 academic year were automatically eligible to be drafted.
- The NWSL playing rights of drafted players will be held until the start of the 2022 preseason rather than the end of the 2021 season as was the case previously.

== Results ==
=== Key ===
^{+}	Denotes player who has been selected as NWSL Most Valuable Player
^{*}	Denotes player who has been selected for an NWSL Best XI or NWSL Second XI team
^{^}	Denotes player who has been selected as NWSL Rookie of the Year
^{#}	Denotes player who has never appeared in a competitive NWSL game (regular season, playoff, or Challenge Cup)

=== Picks ===
Round	Pick	Nat.	Player	Pos.	NWSL team	Notes	College
Round 1	1	(United States)	Emily Fox ^{*}	D	Racing Louisville FC		North Carolina
Round 1	2	(United States)	Trinity Rodman ^{*^}	F	Washington Spirit	(Note: Portland Thorns FC → Sky Blue FC → Washington Spirit. Washington Spirit received a first-round pick in the 2021 NWSL Draft as well as the No. 4, No. 13 and No. 17 picks in the 2020 NWSL College Draft from Sky Blue FC in exchange for Mallory Pugh. Sky Blue FC had acquired Portland Thorns FC's natural first-round pick from in exchange for Raquel Rodríguez.)	Washington State
Round 1	3	(United States)	Brianna Pinto	M	Sky Blue FC		North Carolina
Round 1	4	(United States)	Kiki Pickett	D	Kansas City NWSL	(Note: Orlando Pride → Chicago Red Stars → Sky Blue FC → Kansas City NWSL. Kansas City NWSL acquired the No. 4 pick in the 2021 NWSL Draft from Sky Blue FC in exchange for $175,000 in allocation money. Sky Blue FC had acquired the No. 4 and No. 8 picks in the 2021 NWSL Draft, a conditional first round pick in the 2022 NWSL Draft, and an international slot for 2021 and 2022 from Chicago Red Stars in exchange for Mallory Pugh and Sarah Woldmoe. Chicago Red Stars had previously acquired the natural first-round pick in the 2021 NWSL Draft, the No. 19 pick in the 2020 NWSL College Draft, Rachel Hill and $50,000 of allocation money from Orlando Pride in exchange for the No. 3 and No. 26 picks in the 2020 NWSL College Draft.)	Stanford
Round 1	5	(Bosnia and Herzegovina)	Emina Ekic	M	Racing Louisville FC	(Note: Chicago Red Stars → Racing Louisville FC. Racing Louisville FC acquired the natural first-round pick in the 2021 NWSL Draft as well as forwards Yuki Nagasato and Savannah McCaskill, and an international roster spot for both the 2021 and 2022 seasons from Chicago Red Stars in exchange for full roster protection in the 2020 NWSL Expansion Draft.)	Louisville
Round 1	6	(United States)	Yazmeen Ryan *	M	Portland Thorns FC	(Note: Utah Royals FC → Chicago Red Stars → Portland Thorns FC. Portland Thorns FC acquired the No. 6 pick in the 2021 NWSL Draft from Chicago Red Stars in exchange for the No. 7 and No. 32 picks in the 2021 NWSL Draft and an international slot in 2021. Chicago Red Stars had acquired the natural first-round pick in the 2021 NWSL Draft as well as the No. 4 and No. 13 pick in the 2020 NWSL College Draft and two first-round picks (No. 1 and No. 7) in the 2019 NWSL College Draft from Utah Royals FC in exchange for the rights to Christen Press and Samantha Johnson.)	TCU
Round 1	7	(United States)	Madison Haley ^{#}	F	Chicago Red Stars	(Note: Houston Dash → Portland Thorns FC → Chicago Red Stars. Chicago Red Stars acquired the No. 7 and No. 32 picks in the 2021 NWSL Draft and an international slot in 2021 from Portland Thorns FC in exchange for the No. 6 pick in the 2021 NWSL Draft. Portland Thorns FC acquired the 7th and 37th picks in the 2021 NWSL Draft from Houston Dash in exchange for Emily Ogle and Gabby Seiler.)	Stanford
Round 1	8	(United States)	Tara McKeown *	F	Washington Spirit	(Note: OL Reign → Chicago Red Stars → Sky Blue FC → Washington Spirit. Washington Spirit acquired the No. 8 pick in the 2021 NWSL Draft from Sky Blue FC in exchange for $100,000 in allocation money and Washington's natural second-round pick in the 2022 NWSL Draft. Sky Blue FC had acquired the No. 4 and No. 8 picks in the 2021 NWSL Draft, a conditional first round pick in the 2022 NWSL Draft, and an international slot for 2021 and 2022 from Chicago Red Stars in exchange for Mallory Pugh and Sarah Woldmoe. Chicago Red Stars had previously acquired the natural first-round pick in the 2021 NWSL Draft and natural third-round pick (No. 24) in the 2020 NWSL College Draft from OL Reign in exchange for a first-round pick (No. 9) in the 2020 NWSL College Draft.)	USC
Round 1	9	(United States)	Viviana Villacorta	M	Orlando Pride	(Note: Washington Spirit → Orlando Pride. Orlando Pride acquired the 9th pick in the 2021 NWSL Draft, a first-round pick in either the 2022 or 2023 NWSL Draft (TBD), $140,000 in allocation money and Meggie Dougherty Howard from Washington Spirit in exchange for Emily Sonnett.)	UCLA
Round 1	10	(Canada)	Deanne Rose ^{#}	F	North Carolina Courage		Florida
Round 2	11	(United States)	Taylor Otto	M	Racing Louisville FC		North Carolina
Round 2	12	(United States)	Sam Coffey*	M	Portland Thorns FC		Penn State
Round 2	13	(United States)	Kirsten Davis	F	Racing Louisville FC	(Note: Sky Blue → Racing Louisville FC. Racing Louisville FC acquired the No. 13 pick in the 2021 NWSL Draft and $35,000 in allocation money from Sky Blue FC in exchange for Jennifer Cudjoe.)	Texas Tech
Round 2	14	(United States)	Mikayla Colohan	M	Orlando Pride		BYU
Round 2	15	(Canada)	Victoria Pickett	M	Kansas City NWSL	(Note: Chicago Red Stars → Utah Royals FC. Utah Royals FC acquired the natural second-round pick in the 2021 NWSL Draft from Chicago Red Stars in exchange for Makenzy Doniak.)	Wisconsin
Round 2	16	(England)	Lucy Parker ^{#}	D	Kansas City NWSL		UCLA
Round 2	17	(United States)	Addie McCain	M	Kansas City NWSL	(Note: Houston Dash → Utah Royals FC. Utah Royals FC acquired the natural second-round pick in the 2021 NWSL Draft and natural second-round pick in the 2020 NWSL College Draft from Houston Dash in exchange for Utah Royals FC's third-round pick in the 2020 NWSL College Draft and Katie Stengel.)	Texas A&M
Round 2	18	(United States)	Kelsey Turnbow	F	Chicago Red Stars	(Note: OL Reign → Orlando Pride → Chicago Red Stars. Chicago Red Stars acquired the lowest second-round pick in the 2021 NWSL Draft held by Orlando Pride under the terms of a June 21, 2020 trade. Orlando Pride had acquired the natural second-round pick in the 2021 NWSL Draft from OL Reign in exchange for Dani Weatherholt.)	Santa Clara
Round 2	19	(United States)	Anna Heilferty	F	Washington Spirit		Boston University
Round 2	20	(United States)	Alyssa Malonson	D	North Carolina Courage		Auburn
Round 3	21	(United States)	Parker Goins	F	Racing Louisville FC		Arkansas
Round 3	22	(United States)	Amirah Ali	F	Portland Thorns FC		Rutgers
Round 3	23	(United States)	Taryn Torres	M	Sky Blue FC		Virginia
Round 3	24	(United States)	Kerry Abello *	D	Orlando Pride		Penn State
Round 3	25	(United States)	Brianna Alger ^{#}	D	Chicago Red Stars		Washington State
Round 3	26	(United States)	Joelle Anderson	M	Houston Dash	(Note: Utah Royals FC → Houston Dash. Houston Dash acquired a third-round pick in the 2021 NWSL Draft from Utah Royals FC in exchange for the rights to Aminata Diallo.)	Pepperdine
Round 3	27	(United States)	Makamae Gomera-Stevens	F	Houston Dash		Washington State
Round 3	28	(Mexico)	Jimena López	D	OL Reign		Texas A&M
Round 3	29	(Jamaica)	Sydney Schneider ^{#}	G	Washington Spirit		UNC Wilmington
Round 3	30	(United States)	Myra Konte ^{#}	D	North Carolina Courage		Vanderbilt
Round 4	31	(United States)	Emily Smith ^{#}	D	Racing Louisville FC		California
Round 4	32	(United States)	Channing Foster	F	Chicago Red Stars	(Note: Portland Thorns FC → Chicago Red Stars. Chicago Red Stars acquired the No. 7 and No. 32 picks in the 2021 NWSL Draft and an international slot in 2021 from Portland Thorns FC in exchange for the No. 6 pick in the 2021 NWSL Draft.)	Ole Miss
Round 4	33	(United States)	Delanie Sheehan	D	Sky Blue FC		UCLA
Round 4	34	(United States)	Kaylie Collins	G	Orlando Pride		USC
Round 4	35	(United States)	Alissa Gorzak ^{#}	F	Chicago Red Stars		Virginia
Round 4	36	(United States)	Alex Loera	M	Kansas City NWSL		Santa Clara
Round 4	37	(United States)	Hannah Betfort	D	Portland Thorns FC	(Note: Houston Dash → Portland Thorns FC. Portland Thorns FC acquired the 7th and 37th picks in the 2021 NWSL Draft from Houston Dash in exchange for Emily Ogle and Gabby Seiler.)	Wake Forest
Round 4	38	(United States)	Brookelynn Entz ^{#}	M	Kansas City NWSL	(Note: OL Reign → Kansas City NWSL. Kansas City NWSL acquired the 38th pick in the 2021 NWSL Draft, Darian Jenkins, and the rights to Meg Brandt from OL Reign in exchange for Tziarra King and a second-round pick in the 2022 NWSL Draft.)	Kansas State
Round 4	39	(Venezuela)	Mariana Speckmaier	F	Washington Spirit		Clemson
Round 4	40	(United States)	Tess Boade	F	Sky Blue FC	(Note: North Carolina Courage → Sky Blue FC. Sky Blue FC acquired a conditional fourth-round pick in the 2021 NWSL Draft and McCall Zerboni from North Carolina Courage in exchange for the rights to Hailie Mace.)	Duke

=== Notable undrafted players ===
Below is a list of undrafted rookies who appeared in a competitive NWSL game in 2021.

Nat.	Player	Pos.	Original NWSL team	College	Notes
(United States)	Amber Marshall	M	Houston Dash	Utah State	
(United States)	Parker Roberts	M	Orlando Pride	Florida	
(Mexico)	Karina Rodríguez	D	Washington Spirit	UCLA	

== Trades ==
Round 1:

Round 2:

Round 3:

Round 4:

== Summary ==
In 2021, a total of 28 colleges had players selected. Of these, five had a player drafted to the NWSL for the first time: Boston University, Kansas State, Louisville, UNC Wilmington, and Vanderbilt.

=== Schools with multiple draft selections ===
Selections	Schools
3	North Carolina, UCLA, Washington State
2	Penn State, Santa Clara, Stanford, Texas A&M, USC, Virginia

=== Selections by college athletic conference ===
Conference	Round 1	Round 2	Round 3	Round 4	Total
ACC	3	1	1	4	9
Big Ten	0	2	2	0	4
Big 12	1	1	0	1	3
Colonial	0	0	1	0	1
Pac-12	5	1	2	3	11
Patriot League	0	1	0	0	1
SEC	1	2	3	1	7
West Coast	0	2	1	1	4

=== Selections by position ===
Position	Round 1	Round 2	Round 3	Round 4	Total
Goalkeeper	0	0	1	1	2
Defender	2	2	4	3	11
Midfielder	4	5	2	2	13
Forward	4	3	3	4	14

== See also ==
- List of drafts held by the NWSL
- List of National Women's Soccer League draftees by college team
- 2021 National Women's Soccer League season
