= Abi Kim =

Ghanaian footballer (born 1998)

Personal information
- Full name: Abigail Kofi Kim
- Date of birth: 19 July 1998 (age 28)
- Place of birth: Monrovia, Liberia
- Height: 1.73 m (5 ft 8 in)
- Position: Forward

Team information
- Current team: Neom
- Number: 19

Youth career
- Pacific Northwest SC

College career
Years	Team	Apps	(Gls)
2016–2019	California Golden Bears	80	(18)

Senior career*
Years	Team	Apps	(Gls)
2019	LA Galaxy OC	3	(0)
2020–2021	Fiorentina	6	(1)
2021–2022	Orlando Pride	17	(0)
2023–2024	Bordeaux	22	(3)
2024–2025	Ankara BB Fomget	22	(17)
2025–	Neom		

International career^{‡}
2015–2016	United States U18		
2017–2018	United States U20	24	(6)
2019	United States U23	2	(0)
2025–	Ghana	1	(0)
- * Club domestic league appearances and goals as of 4 May 2025 ‡ National team caps and goals as of 30 May 2025

Abigail Kofi Kim (born 19 July 1998) is a professional footballer who plays as a forward for Saudi Women's Premier League club NEOM. Born in Liberia, she has represented the United States internationally up to under-23 level and currently represents Ghana.

Having played college soccer for California Golden Bears, she has since appeared for LA Galaxy OC in United Women's Soccer, Orlando Pride of the National Women's Soccer League and in Italy for Serie A team Fiorentina.

== Early life ==
Born in Monrovia, Liberia, Kim grew up with an adopted family in Vashon, Washington. Kim attended Seattle Christian High School and helped lead the school's soccer team to the 1A state championship title in 2015, scoring 41 goals in 20 matches and was named MVP by the Washington State Soccer Coaches Association. She played club soccer for Pacific Northwest SC, winning the state championship in 2013 and 2014. Kim was also a track and field athlete for Seattle Christian, helping the team to three consecutive state titles.

=== California Golden Bears ===
Kim was recruited to play college soccer for California Golden Bears. She was a four-year starter between 2016 and 2019, notably earning Pac-12 All-Freshman Team honors in a 2016 season in which she saw action in all 21 of Cal's matches, leading all freshmen with 16 starts. In 2019, Kim was named captain of the team for her senior season. A legal studies major, Kim was also a Pac-12 All-Academic Honorable Mention in 2018.

In the 2019 offseason, Kim joined UWS club LA Galaxy OC, making three appearances as the team won the National Championship.

== Club career ==
=== Fiorentina ===
Kim was selected in the third round (26th overall) of the 2020 NWSL College Draft by Orlando Pride. Having joined up with the team for preseason, all NWSL activities were shut down just three days in to camp due to the developing coronavirus pandemic. With the ongoing disruption of the 2020 NWSL season and having rehabbed from a knee injury sustained while training over summer, Kim elected to sign in Italy with Serie A team Fiorentina in June. With issues surrounding travel and quarantines, Kim's signing wasn't officially completed until 17 October. She made her debut on November 1, starting in a 6–1 victory against second division ASD Riozzese in the 2020–21 Coppa Italia group stage. She scored her first goal for the club on 13 December in a 1–1 Serie A draw with Empoli. Three days later she made her UEFA Women's Champions League debut, starting in a Round of 32 second leg away at Slavia Prague. Fiorentina scored a stoppage time winner to progress 3–2 on aggregate.

=== Orlando Pride ===
After a spell in Italy, Kim returned to Orlando Pride for preseason ahead of the 2021 season and signed a two-year contract with an option for an additional year on 2 March 2021. She made her professional NWSL debut for the club on 10 April 2021, as a 78th-minute substitute in the team's Challenge Cup opener against Racing Louisville and scored to give Orlando the lead in the 88th minute. The game finished 2–2. On 24 August 2022, Kim was waived. In two seasons she made 21 appearances in all competitions, scoring one goal and two assists.

=== Bordeaux ===
In August 2023, Kim signed a two-year contract with French Division 1 Féminine club Bordeaux.

=== Ankara BB Fomget ===
In September 2024, she moved to Turkey, and signed a deal with Ankara BB Fomget to play in the Turkish Super League. She won the champions title in the 2024–25 Super League season.

== International career ==
Kim has represented the United States at the under-18 and under-20 and under-23 levels.

In January 2018, Kim was part of the under-20 team that finished as runners-up at the 2018 CONCACAF Women's U-20 Championship, losing the final to Mexico in a penalty shoot-out. In August 2018, Kim was also named to the 2018 FIFA U-20 Women's World Cup squad. The team failed to get out of the group behind Spain and Japan as Kim made three substitute appearances.

In April 2019, Kim was called up to the under-23 team to play at the La Manga U23 tournament, starting in two of the three games.

Kim was born in Liberia to a Ghanaian father and Liberian mother, which makes her eligible to represent Ghana. In April 2024, she was approached by Ghana women's national team head coach Nora Häuptle to talk about a possible call-up.

On 30 May 2025, she made her senior debut for Ghana as an 83th-minute substitution in a 3–3 away friendly draw against Ivory Coast.

On 30 October 2025, Kim's request to switch international allegiance to Ghana was approved by FIFA.

== International goals ==
No.	Date	Venue	Opponent	Score	Result	Competition
1.	8 October 2026	Côte d'Or National Sports Complex, Saint Pierre, Mauritius	Mauritius	1–0	3–0	2028 CAF Women's Olympic qualifying tournament

== Career statistics ==
=== College ===
School	Season	Division	Apps	Goals
California Golden Bears	2016	Div. I	21	3
California Golden Bears	2017	Div. I	20	7
California Golden Bears	2018	Div. I	18	6
California Golden Bears	2019	Div. I	21	2
Career total			80	18

=== Club ===
As of 24 August 2022.

Club	Season	League			National cup (Note: Includes Coppa Italia and NWSL Challenge Cup)		Continental		Other		Total	
Club	Season	Division	Apps	Goals	Apps	Goals	Apps	Goals	Apps	Goals	Apps	Goals
LA Galaxy OC	2019	USW	3	0	—		—		—		3	0
Fiorentina	2020–21	Serie A	6	1	2	0	1 (Note: Appearance in UEFA Women's Champions League)	0	2 (Note: Appearances in Supercoppa Italia)	1	11	2
Orlando Pride	2021	NWSL	6	0	2	1	—		—		8	1
Orlando Pride	2022	NWSL	11	0	2	0	—		—		13	0
Orlando Pride	Total		17	0	4	1	0	0	0	0	21	1
Ankara BB Fomget	2024–25	Turkish Super League	22	17							22	17
Career total			48	18	6	1	1	0	2	1	57	20

== Honors ==
LA Galaxy OC

- UWS National Championship: 2019

Fiorentina

- Supercoppa Italiana runner-up: 2020

Ankara BB Fomget

- Turkish Super League: 2024–25

United States U20

- CONCACAF Women's U-20 Championship runner-up: 2018
