= 2021 NWSL Challenge Cup =

Second edition of top women's soccer league cup in the United States

2021 National Women's Soccer League Challenge Cup presented by Secret Deodorant

Tournament details
- Country: United States
- Dates: April 9 – May 8
- Teams: 10

Final positions
- Champions: Portland Thorns FC (1st title)
- Runners-up: NJ/NY Gotham FC

Tournament statistics
- Matches played: 21
- Goals scored: 48 (2.29 per match)
- Top goal scorer(s): Debinha (3 goals)

Awards
- MVP: Debinha

The 2021 NWSL Challenge Cup was a league cup tournament that took place during the 2021 National Women's Soccer League season. It began on April 9 and ended May 8, one week before the start of the regular season. It was the second iteration of the NWSL Challenge Cup tournament, which had started in 2020 in response to the COVID-19 pandemic and was announced as a regular event later in 2020. Portland Thorns FC won the 2021 final over NJ/NY Gotham FC in a penalty shootout.

== Format ==
While the inaugural Challenge Cup took place entirely in a single "bubble" location during the COVID-19 pandemic, the 2021 Challenge Cup was played in home markets. The 10 NWSL teams were organized into two regional divisions of five teams each. Every team played four games within their division, with the two division winners competing in the final on May 8.

The full schedule was released on March 9, 2021, along with tournament rules and regulations.

=== Tiebreakers ===
The initial determining factor for a team's position in the standings was most points earned, with three points earned for a win, one point for a draw, and zero points for a loss. If two or more teams were equal on points after completion of the preliminary round, the following criteria were applied to determine team rankings:

1. Superior goal difference in all divisional matches.
2. Greatest number of goals scored in all divisional matches.
3. Lowest team conduct score relating to the number of yellow and red cards obtained, where only one of the below point totals shall be applied to a player in a single match:
  1. yellow card: 1 point;
  2. indirect red card (as a result of two yellow cards): 3 points;
  3. direct red card: 4 points;
  4. yellow card and direct red card: 5 points.
4. Drawing of lots by the NWSL.

=== Final ===
The final was hosted by the team with the best record across both divisions. The final was 90 minutes; in the event it was tied, teams would proceed directly to a penalty shootout with no overtime periods.

== East Division ==
=== Standings ===
Pos	Team	Pld	W	D	L	GF	GA	GD	Pts	Qualification
1	NJ/NY Gotham FC	4	2	2	0	5	3	+2	8	Qualification for the Championship
2	North Carolina Courage	4	2	1	1	9	8	+1	7	
3	Orlando Pride	4	1	2	1	3	3	0	5	
4	Washington Spirit	4	1	1	2	3	4	−1	4	
5	Racing Louisville FC	4	0	2	2	4	6	−2	2	

Source: NWSL
Rules for classification: Tiebreakers

=== Games ===
April 10, 2021
15:30 ET

North Carolina Courage	3–2	Washington Spirit
Hamilton 10'; McDonald 28'; Mathias 51' (yellow card) 90+7'	Report	Yokoyama 4'; Rodman 60'; Jacobs (yellow card) 63'

Sahlen's Stadium, Cary, North Carolina
Attendance: 2,300
Referee: Alyssa Nichols

April 10, 2021
19:00 ET

Racing Louisville FC	2–2	Orlando Pride
Kizer 12'; Fox (yellow card) 66'; Baucom (yellow card) 83'; Hendrix 90+3'	Report	Kornieck (yellow card) 35' (goal) 44'; Kim 88'

Lynn Family Stadium, Louisville, Kentucky
Attendance: 5,300
Referee: Katja Koroleva

April 14, 2021
19:00 ET

Orlando Pride	0–1	NJ/NY Gotham FC
Plummer (yellow card) 82'	Report	Skroski (yellow card) 24'; Dydasco (yellow card) 52'; Monaghan 79'

Exploria Stadium, Orlando, Florida
Referee: Natalie Simon

April 15, 2021
19:00 ET

Washington Spirit	1–0	Racing Louisville FC
Roddar (yellow card) 59'; Huster (yellow card) 79'; Sanchez 90+3'	Report	Olofsson (yellow card) 52'

Audi Field, Washington, D.C.
Referee: Danielle Chesky

April 20, 2021
18:00 ET

NJ/NY Gotham FC	4–3	North Carolina Courage
Purce 18', 26'; Lloyd 32'; Cudjoe (yellow card) 86'; Viens 90+2'	Report	Debinha 22', 24'; McDonald 50'

MSU Soccer Park, Montclair, New Jersey
Referee: Laura Rodriguez

April 21, 2021
19:00 ET

Orlando Pride	1–0	Washington Spirit
Leroux 11'; Marta (yellow card) 13'; Riley (yellow card) 36'; Harris (yellow card) 80'	Report	Sonnett (yellow card) 6'; O'Hara (yellow card) 86' (yellow-red card) 90+2'

Exploria Stadium, Orlando, Florida
Referee: Alexandra Billeter

April 26, 2021
18:00 ET

Racing Louisville FC	2–3	North Carolina Courage
Kizer 24'; Baucom 75'	Report	Pickett (yellow card) 12'; Hamilton 33'; Kurtz (yellow card) 49'; Debinha 57'; Ashley 84' (o.g.)

Lynn Family Stadium, Louisville, Kentucky
Attendance: 3,742
Referee: Tori Penso

April 27, 2021
19:00 ET

Washington Spirit	0–0	NJ/NY Gotham FC
Heilferty (yellow card) 88'	Report

Audi Field, Washington, D.C.
Attendance: 2,039
Referee: Karen Callado

May 1, 2021
16:30 ET

North Carolina Courage	0–0	Orlando Pride
DeBree (yellow card) 2'	Report

Sahlen's Stadium, Cary, North Carolina
Attendance: 2,426
Referee: Katja Koroleva

May 2, 2021
12:30 ET

NJ/NY Gotham FC	0–0	Racing Louisville FC
Cudjoe (yellow card) 28'	Report

MSU Soccer Park, Montclair, New Jersey
Referee: Karen Abt

== West Division ==
=== Standings ===
Pos	Team	Pld	W	D	L	GF	GA	GD	Pts	Qualification
1	Portland Thorns FC	4	3	1	0	6	2	+4	10	Qualification for the Championship
2	OL Reign	4	2	1	1	5	5	0	7	
3	Houston Dash	4	1	3	0	4	2	+2	6	
4	Chicago Red Stars	4	0	2	2	3	5	−2	2	
5	Kansas City	4	0	1	3	4	8	−4	1	

Source: NWSL
Rules for classification: Tiebreakers

=== Games ===
April 9, 2021
19:30 CT

Houston Dash	0–0	Chicago Red Stars
	Report	Wright (yellow card) 26'

BBVA Stadium, Houston, Texas
Attendance: 4,204
Referee: Tori Penso

April 9, 2021
19:30 PT

Portland Thorns FC	2–1	Kansas City
R. Rodríguez 8'; Charley (yellow card) 49' (yellow-red card) 89'; Lussi 58'; Parsons (red card) 90+1'; Weaver (red card) 90+3'	Report	Pickett (yellow card) 48'; A. Rodriguez 60' (yellow card) 70'; Del Fava (yellow card) 90+1'; Edmonds (red card) 90+4'

Providence Park, Portland, Oregon
Referee: Danielle Chesky

April 15, 2021
18:30 CT

Chicago Red Stars	0–1	Portland Thorns FC
Stevens (yellow card) 85'	Report	Westphal (yellow card) 45'; Weaver 66'

SeatGeek Stadium, Bridgeview, Illinois
Referee: Karen Callado

April 16, 2021
19:00 PT

OL Reign	0–0	Houston Dash
Weatherholt (yellow card) 23'	Report	Groom (yellow card) 25'

Cheney Stadium, Tacoma, Washington
Referee: Katja Koroleva

April 21, 2021
17:30 CT

Chicago Red Stars	1–1	Kansas City
Ertz (yellow card) 66'; Johnson 82'	Report	Rodriguez 80'; Vincent (yellow card) 85'

SeatGeek Stadium, Bridgeview, Illinois
Referee: Natalie Simon

April 21, 2021
19:00 PT

Portland Thorns FC	2–0	OL Reign
Horan 17' (yellow card) 72'; Charley 46'	Report	Brooks (yellow card) 65'

Providence Park, Portland, Oregon
Referee: Karen Abt

April 26, 2021
20:30 ET

Kansas City	1–3	Houston Dash
Miramontez (yellow card) 29'; Corsie (yellow card) 40'; Del Fava (yellow card) 54'; Vasconcelos 77'	Report	Mewis 25', 71'; Campbell (yellow card) 34'; Daly 45+1' (pen.); Visalli (yellow card) 58'

Children's Mercy Park, Kansas City, Kansas
Referee: Alyssa Nichols

April 27, 2021
19:00 PT

OL Reign	3–2	Chicago Red Stars
Huerta 41'; Pruitt 70'; King 87'	Report	Pugh 38'; Gautrat 90'

Cheney Stadium, Tacoma, Washington
Attendance: 1,105
Referee: Laura Rodriguez

May 2, 2021
18:30 CT

Houston Dash	1–1	Portland Thorns FC
Groom 45+2' (yellow card) 57'; Chapman (yellow card) 90+3'	Report	Sinclair 77'

BBVA Stadium, Houston, Texas
Attendance: 3,162
Referee: Elvis Osmanovic

May 3, 2021
19:00 CT

Kansas City	1–2	OL Reign
Weber 6'	Report	Fishlock 34' (pen.) (yellow card) 59'; King (yellow card) 35'; Pruitt (yellow card) 79'; Celia 84'

Field of Legends, Kansas City, Kansas
Referee: Karen Callado

== Championship ==
Portland Thorns FC won the right to host the final by finishing with the best record across both divisions. The game finished in a 1-1 draw after the regulation 90 minutes, so it proceeded to a penalty shootout. Each team missed one penalty kick during the first five rounds, both hitting a shot off the crossbar. In the seventh round, Gotham FC, shooting first, had a shot saved by Portland goalkeeper Adrianna Franch, and Morgan Weaver converted Portland's try to win the tournament.

May 8, 2021
10:00 PT

Portland Thorns FC	1–1	NJ/NY Gotham FC
Sinclair 8'; Charley (yellow card) 79'	Report	Lewandowski (yellow card) 38'; Lloyd 61'
Penalties
Sinclair (penalty scored); Klingenberg (penalty missed); Horan (penalty scored); Rodríguez (penalty scored); Dunn (penalty scored); Sauerbrunn (penalty scored); Weaver (penalty scored)	6–5	(penalty scored) Long; (penalty scored) Lloyd; (penalty missed) Cudjoe; (penalty scored) Freeman; (penalty scored) Onumonu; (penalty scored) Viens; (penalty missed) Kawasumi

Providence Park, Portland, Oregon
Attendance: 4,588
Referee: Natalie Simon

== Statistics ==
=== Goalscorers ===
Statistics do not include penalty-shootout goals.There were 48 goals scored in 21 matches, for an average of 2.29 goals per match.

3 goals

- (Brazil) Debinha, NC

2 goals

- (United States) Kristie Mewis, HOU
- (United States) Amy Rodriguez, KC
- (United States) Carli Lloyd, NJY
- (United States) Margaret Purce, NJY
- (United States) Kristen Hamilton, NC
- (United States) Jessica McDonald, NC
- (Canada) Christine Sinclair, POR
- (United States) Cece Kizer, LOU

1 goal

- (United States) Morgan Gautrat, CHI
- (Mexico) Katie Johnson, CHI
- (United States) Mallory Pugh, CHI
- (England) Rachel Daly, HOU
- (United States) Shea Groom, HOU
- (United States) Michele Vasconcelos, KC
- (United States) Mallory Weber, KC
- (United States) Paige Monaghan, NJY
- (Canada) Évelyne Viens, NJY
- (United States) Merritt Mathias, NC
- (Wales) Jess Fishlock, RGN
- (United States) Sofia Huerta, RGN
- (Spain) Celia, RGN
- (United States) Tziarra King, RGN
- (United States) Leah Pruitt, RGN
- (United States) Abi Kim, ORL
- (United States) Taylor Kornieck, ORL
- (United States) Sydney Leroux, ORL
- (United States) Simone Charley, POR
- (United States) Lindsey Horan, POR
- (United States) Tyler Lussi, POR
- (Costa Rica) Raquel Rodríguez, POR
- (United States) Morgan Weaver, POR
- (United States) Jorian Baucom, LOU
- (United States) Brooke Hendrix, LOU
- (United States) Trinity Rodman, WAS
- (United States) Ashley Sanchez, WAS
- (Japan) Kumi Yokoyama, WAS

1 own goal

- Julia Ashley, LOU (against NC)

Source: NWSL

=== Discipline ===
A player would be automatically suspended for the next match in the tournament for the following offenses:

- Receiving a red card (red card suspensions may be extended for serious offenses);
- Receiving two yellow cards in two matches, unless the second yellow card was accumulated in the final match of divisional play;
- Only direct red card suspensions would be carried over to the NWSL regular season.

The following suspensions were served during the tournament:

Player / Coach	Offense(s)	Suspension
(United States) Simone Charley, POR	(yellow card) (yellow-red card) vs. KC, April 9	vs. CHI, April 15
(England) Mark Parsons, POR	(red card) vs. KC, April 9	vs. CHI, April 15
(United States) Morgan Weaver, POR	(red card) vs. KC, April 9	Rescinded
(United States) Kristen Edmonds, KC	(red card) vs. POR, April 9	vs. CHI, April 21 vs. HOU, April 26
(United States) Jorian Baucom, LOU	Major game misconduct vs. ORL, April 10	vs. WAS, April 15
(United States) Kelley O'Hara, WAS	(yellow card) (yellow-red card) vs. ORL, April 21	vs. NJY, April 27
(United States) Kate Del Fava, KC	(yellow card) vs. POR, April 9 (yellow card) vs. HOU, April 26	vs. RGN, May 3
(Argentina) Mariana Larroquette, KC	Major game misconduct vs. HOU, April 26	vs. RGN, May 3

=== Awards ===
Debinha of the North Carolina Courage was voted the tournament's Most Valuable Player. DiDi Haracic (NJ/NY Gotham FC) and Christine Sinclair (Portland Thorns FC), whose teams faced off in the final, were the other two MVP finalists.

Adrianna Franch of the Portland Thorns was voted the MVP of the championship game. She was also named NWSL Player of the Week for her play in the championship game.

==== Weekly awards ====
Week	Player of the Week		Save of the Week		Ref.
Week	Player	Club	Player	Club	Ref.
1			(United States) Ashlyn Harris	Orlando Pride	
2	(United States) Ashlyn Harris	Orlando Pride	(United States) Ashlyn Harris (2)	Orlando Pride	
3	(United States) Kristie Mewis	Houston Dash	(United States) Michelle Betos	Racing Louisville FC	
4	(Spain) Celia	OL Reign	(United States) Carson Pickett	North Carolina Courage	
5	(United States) Adrianna Franch	Portland Thorns FC	(Bosnia and Herzegovina) DiDi Haracic	NJ/NY Gotham FC	

== Broadcasting ==
NWSL's broadcasting partnership with CBS Sports and Twitch continued. In the US, CBS Sports Network (CBSSN) aired the opener, a rematch of the 2020 NWSL Challenge Cup Championship between Houston Dash and Chicago Red Stars, on April 9, as well as three additional games; the final game on May 8 was available on CBS and Paramount+; and all other games were streamed exclusively on Paramount+. Every game was available on Twitch internationally, including in Canada when games were not on CBS Sports Network.

JP Dellacamera and Aly Wagner commentated on the opening game and the final, while Jenn Hildreth and Lori Lindsey provided commentary in three other games on CBSSN. Marisa Pilla returned to the coverage as sideline reporter. Commentators for Paramount+ and Twitch coverage included play-by-play announcers Mike Watts, Jordan Angeli, Josh Eastern, Joe Malfa and Josh Tolle, and match analyst Lori Lindsey, Jen Cooper, Kaylyn Kyle, Lisa Roman and Kacey White.
