= Freja Olofsson =

Swedish footballer (born 1998)

- Olofsson with Real Madrid in 2023

Personal information
- Full name: Freja Siri Margareta Olofsson
- Date of birth: 24 May 1998 (age 28)
- Place of birth: Örebro, Sweden
- Height: 5 ft 9 in (1.75 m)
- Position: Midfielder

Team information
- Current team: Como 1907
- Number: 8

Senior career*
Years	Team	Apps	(Gls)
2015–2018	KIF Örebro	69	(6)
2019	Arna-Bjørnar	7	(0)
2020	KIF Örebro	21	(2)
2021–2022	Racing Louisville	37	(0)
2022–2024	Real Madrid	29	(0)
2024–2026	Madrid CFF	16	(0)
2026–	Como 1907	0	(0)

International career^{‡}
2015	Sweden U17	3	(0)
- * Club domestic league appearances and goals as of 05:20, 31 August 2026 (UTC) ‡ National team caps and goals as of 21 May 2016

Freja Siri Margareta Olofsson (born 24 May 1998) is a Swedish professional footballer who plays as a midfielder for Serie A club Como 1907.

== Club career ==
Olofsson began her professional career with KIF Orebro, making 69 appearances for the Swedish club. After tearing her ACL after seven appearances with Arna-Bjørnar, Olofsson returned in 2020 with KIF and scored twice in 21 appearances.

She signed a one-year contract with National Women's Soccer League club Racing Louisville FC in 2021, starting 20 league matches in her first season. She signed a three-year contract with Racing Louisville in May 2022, but started only 9 league matches in her second season before being transferred under new manager Kim Björkegren.

On 7 September 2022, Racing announced the transfer of Olofsson to Real Madrid four months into her three-year contract with Racing, in exchange for an undisclosed transfer fee. She scored twice in 47 matches across all competitions before leaving Real Madrid after two years. 10 of her appearances came in the UEFA Women's Champions League.

In July 2024, Olofsson signed for Madrid CFF.

On 22 July 2026, Olofsson was announced at newly-promoted Italian club Como 1907.
