= List of Orlando Pride players =

This list comprises all players who have played for Orlando Pride which dates from their inaugural National Women's Soccer League season in 2016 to present.

A "†" denotes players who featured in a matchday squad with the team but never made an appearance.

Bolded players are currently under contract by Orlando Pride.

Stats include all competitive matches (NWSL regular season, playoffs, Challenge Cup and Summer Cup).

All stats accurate as of match played October 2, 2026.

== Players ==
=== Outfield players ===
| Name | D.O.B. | Position | Nationality | Years | Games | Goals | Debut | Ref |
|---|---|---|---|---|---|---|---|---|
| **Kerry Abello** | September 17, 1999 | DF | United States | 2022–present | 116 | 4 | April 3, 2022 | |
| Adriana | November 17, 1996 | FW | Brazil | 2023–2024 | 46 | 12 | March 26, 2023 | |
| Amanda Allen | February 21, 2005 | FW | Canada | 2023–2025 | 25 | 0 | May 6, 2023 | |
| Laura Alleway | November 28, 1989 | DF | Australia | 2016–2017 | 13 | 0 | April 17, 2016 | |
| **Hannah Anderson** | April 3, 2001 | DF | United States | 2026–present | 17 | 0 | March 15, 2026 | |
| **Angelina** | January 26, 2000 | MF | Brazil | 2024–present | 74 | 2 | March 16, 2024 | |
| **Barbra Banda** | March 20, 2000 | FW | Zambia | 2024–present | 65 | 42 | April 19, 2024 | |
| Josée Bélanger | May 14, 1986 | DF | Canada | 2016 | 14 | 0 | April 17, 2016 | |
| **Elyse Bennett** | December 27, 1999 | FW | United States | 2025–present | 3 | 0 | September 3, 2025 | |
| McKenzie Berryhill † | March 24, 1993 | DF | United States | 2016–2017 | 0 | 0 | N/A | |
| Deneisha Blackwood | March 7, 1997 | MF | Jamaica | 2020 | 4 | 0 | September 19, 2020 | |
| Jo Blankenship † | June 10, 1994 | MF | United States | 2017 | 0 | 0 | N/A | |
| Joanna Boyles | November 13, 1995 | MF | United States | 2019 | 19 | 1 | April 14, 2019 | |
| Messiah Bright | January 12, 2000 | FW | United States | 2023 | 28 | 7 | March 26, 2023 | |
| Haley Bugeja | May 5, 2004 | FW | Malta | 2022–2023 | 5 | 0 | September 21, 2022 | |
| Christina Burkenroad | July 12, 1993 | FW | Mexico | 2016–2017 | 8 | 0 | May 28, 2016 | |
| Bridget Callahan | April 16, 1996 | MF | United States | 2018–2019 | 9 | 0 | March 31, 2018 | |
| Camila | October 10, 1994 | MF | Brazil | 2017–2020 | 49 | 5 | May 7, 2017 | |
| **Seven Castain** | April 26, 2004 | FW | United States | 2026–present | 11 | 0 | March 15, 2026 | |
| Steph Catley | January 26, 1994 | DF | Australia | 2016–2017 | 35 | 1 | April 17, 2016 | |
| Celia | June 20, 1995 | DF | Spain | 2022–2024 | 38 | 3 | April 3, 2022 | |
| **Grace Chanda** | June 11, 1997 | MF | Zambia | 2025–present | 7 | 0 | April 19, 2025 | |
| **Simone Charley** | February 4, 1995 | FW | United States | 2025–present | 12 | 1 | March 16, 2024 | |
| **Zara Chavoshi** | December 6, 2002 | DF | Canada | 2025–present | 24 | 0 | March 23, 2025 | |
| Prisca Chilufya | June 8, 1999 | FW | Zambia | 2025 | 20 | 2 | March 8, 2025 | |
| Mikayla Cluff | February 25, 1999 | MF | United States | 2022–2023 | 50 | 4 | March 19, 2022 | |
| Caitlin Cosme | January 19, 1999 | DF | United States | 2022–2023 | 6 | 0 | March 26, 2023 | |
| Christine Creighton † | March 22, 1997 | FW | United States | 2018 | 0 | 0 | N/A | |
| Lisa De Vanna | November 14, 1984 | FW | Australia | 2016 | 3 | 0 | September 7, 2016 | |
| Meggie Dougherty Howard | July 27, 1995 | MF | United States | 2021–2022 | 44 | 3 | April 10, 2021 | |
| **Julie Doyle** | August 30, 1998 | FW | United States | 2022–present | 91 | 10 | April 16, 2022 | |
| Nickolette Driesse | November 8, 1994 | MF | Puerto Rico | 2017 | 4 | 0 | April 29, 2017 | |
| Evelina Duljan | October 20, 1998 | MF | Sweden | 2024 | 11 | 1 | July 20, 2024 | |
| **Cori Dyke** | September 20, 2000 | DF | United States | 2024–present | 78 | 2 | April 26, 2024 | |
| Kristen Edmonds | May 22, 1987 | MF | United States | 2016–2020 | 73 | 10 | April 17, 2016 | |
| Becky Edwards | May 22, 1988 | MF | United States | 2016 | 16 | 0 | April 17, 2016 | |
| Abby Elinsky | January 8, 1996 | MF | United States | 2018–2020 | 24 | 0 | April 15, 2018 | |
| Claire Emslie | March 8, 1994 | FW | Scotland | 2019–2020 | 11 | 0 | July 20, 2019 | |
| Danica Evans | June 2, 1995 | FW | United States | 2017–2019 | 26 | 2 | April 15, 2017 | |
| Maddy Evans | April 21, 1991 | MF | United States | 2016–2017 | 28 | 0 | April 17, 2016 | |
| Caitlin Farrell | September 29, 1997 | FW | United States | 2019 | 3 | 0 | May 25, 2019 | |
| Jamia Fields | September 24, 1993 | FW | United States | 2016–2017 | 28 | 0 | May 20, 2016 | |
| Leah Fortune | December 13, 1990 | MF | Brazil | 2016 | 3 | 0 | July 10, 2016 | |
| Morgan Gautrat | February 26, 1993 | MF | United States | 2024–2025 | 34 | 0 | March 16, 2024 | |
| Nádia Gomes † | November 9, 1996 | FW | Portugal | 2018 | 0 | 0 | N/A | |
| Erin Greening | June 20, 1997 | DF | United States | 2019 | 17 | 1 | April 14, 2019 | |
| Sarah Hagen | November 18, 1989 | FW | United States | 2016 | 17 | 2 | April 17, 2016 | |
| Tori Hansen | January 14, 2001 | DF | United States | 2023–2024 | 2 | 1 | April 19, 2023 | |
| Ally Haran | May 21, 1996 | DF | Canada | 2020–2021 | 4 | 1 | September 26, 2020 | |
| **Oihane Hernández** | May 4, 2000 | DF | Spain | 2025–present | 46 | 0 | March 8, 2025 | |
| Rachel Hill | April 17, 1995 | FW | United States | 2017–2019 | 60 | 11 | June 3, 2017 | |
| Kate Howarth | July 3, 1991 | FW | United States | 2020 | 2 | 0 | September 19, 2020 | |
| **Simone Jackson** | January 28, 2003 | FW | United States | 2025–present | 17 | 0 | June 21, 2025 | |
| Angharad James | June 1, 1994 | MF | Wales | 2022 | 11 | 0 | March 19, 2022 | |
| Darian Jenkins | January 5, 1995 | FW | United States | 2022 | 23 | 4 | March 19, 2022 | |
| Gunnhildur Jónsdóttir | September 28, 1988 | MF | Iceland | 2021–2022 | 48 | 5 | April 21, 2021 | |
| Alika Keene † | January 15, 1994 | DF | Jamaica | 2019 | 0 | 0 | N/A | |
| Alanna Kennedy | January 21, 1995 | DF | Australia | 2017–2020 | 60 | 8 | May 14, 2017 | |
| Hana Kerner † | March 17, 1997 | DF | United States | 2019 | 0 | 0 | N/A | |
| Alex Kerr | July 23, 2001 | FW | United States | 2024 | 4 | 1 | June 7, 2024 | |
| Abi Kim | July 19, 1998 | FW | Ghana | 2021–2022 | 21 | 1 | April 10, 2021 | |
| Julie King | October 21, 1989 | DF | United States | 2019–2020 | 2 | 0 | August 10, 2019 | |
| Taylor Kornieck | November 22, 1998 | MF | United States | 2020–2021 | 26 | 3 | April 10, 2021 | |
| Ali Krieger | July 28, 1984 | DF | United States | 2017–2021 | 86 | 0 | May 14, 2017 | |
| Kaylyn Kyle | October 6, 1988 | MF | Canada | 2016 | 18 | 0 | April 17, 2016 | |
| Mariana Larroquette (Note: Out on loan at Newell's Old Boys until July 1, 2025) | October 24, 1992 | FW | Argentina | 2023–2025 | 16 | 1 | August 20, 2023 | |
| **Sanne Lekven** | July 1, 2001 | FW | (Norway) NORWAY | 2026–present | 3 | 0 | September 6, 2026 | |
| **Ally Lemos** | March 4, 2004 | MF | United States | 2024–present | 62 | 2 | March 16, 2024 | |
| **Luana** | May 2, 1993 | MF | Brazil | 2024–present | 30 | 0 | March 16, 2024 | |
| Carrie Lawrence | July 15, 1997 | DF | United States | 2020–2024 | 33 | 0 | September 19, 2020 | |
| Sierra Lelii † | May 4, 1993 | FW | United States | 2016 | 0 | 0 | N/A | |
| Sydney Leroux | May 7, 1990 | FW | United States | 2018–2022 | 63 | 18 | March 24, 2018 | |
| Cami Levin | April 24, 1990 | FW | United States | 2016–2017 | 10 | 0 | May 8, 2016 | |
| Jordyn Listro | August 10, 1995 | MF | Canada | 2020–2021; 2022–2023 | 42 | 0 | September 19, 2020 | |
| **Hallie Mace** | March 24, 1997 | DF | United States | 2026–present | 25 | 0 | March 15, 2026 | |
| **Marta** | February 19, 1986 | FW | Brazil | 2017–present | 168 | 49 | May 14, 2017 | |
| Brianna Martinez | April 22, 2000 | DF | United States | 2023–2025 | 27 | 0 | April 23, 2023 | |
| **Zoe Matthews** | May 25, 2007 | MF | United States | 2026–present | 3 | 0 | August 1, 2026 | |
| Phoebe McClernon | December 13, 1997 | DF | United States | 2020–2021 | 25 | 0 | April 10, 2021 | |
| **Haley McCutcheon** | February 22, 1996 | DF | United States | 2022–present | 113 | 12 | August 20, 2022 | |
| Mônica | April 21, 1987 | DF | Brazil | 2016–2018 | 53 | 0 | April 17, 2016 | |
| Megan Montefusco | September 3, 1992 | DF | United States | 2022–2024 | 45 | 1 | March 19, 2022 | |
| Jade Moore | October 22, 1990 | MF | England | 2020–2021 | 4 | 0 | April 10, 2021 | |
| Alex Morgan | July 2, 1989 | FW | United States | 2016–2021 | 69 | 23 | April 17, 2016 | |
| Maliah Morris | December 31, 2000 | FW | United States | 2023 | 3 | 0 | April 19, 2023 | |
| **Kylie Nadaner** | March 18, 1992 | DF | United States | 2021–present | 107 | 2 | July 9, 2021 | |
| Christine Nairn | September 25, 1990 | MF | United States | 2018 | 20 | 1 | March 24, 2018 | |
| **Gabi Nunes** | March 10, 1997 | FW | Brazil | 2026–Present | 2 | 0 | August 16, 2026 | |
| Lotta Ökvist † | February 17, 1997 | DF | Sweden | 2018 | 0 | 0 | N/A | |
| **Jessica Ovalle** | October 19, 1999 | FW | Brazil | 2025–present | 31 | 4 | September 7, 2025 | |
| **Nicole Payne** | January 18, 2001 | DF | Nigeria | 2026–present | 11 | 1 | May 2, 2026 | |
| Courtney Petersen | October 28, 1997 | DF | United States | 2020–2022 | 54 | 1 | September 19, 2020 | |
| Carson Pickett | September 15, 1993 | DF | United States | 2018–2020; 2024–2025 | 74 | 5f | March 24, 2018 | |
| Konya Plummer | August 2, 1997 | DF | Jamaica | 2020–2021 | 7 | 0 | September 26, 2020 | |
| Poliana | February 6, 1991 | DF | Brazil | 2018 | 10 | 0 | March 24, 2018 | |
| Taylor Porter † | October 29, 1997 | MF | United States | 2019 | 0 | 0 | N/A | |
| Toni Pressley | February 19, 1990 | DF | United States | 2016–2022 | 94 | 4 | May 14, 2016 | |
| Leah Pruitt | September 5, 1997 | FW | United States | 2022–2023 | 16 | 1 | March 26, 2022 | |
| **Reagan Raabe** | September 27, 2001 | MF | United States | 2022–2023 | 1 | 0 | March 15, 2026 | |
| Morgan Reid | June 13, 1995 | DF | United States | 2019–2020 | 7 | 0 | May 11, 2019 | |
| Thais Reiss | December 9, 1999 | MF | Brazil | 2022–2023 | 8 | 0 | June 12, 2022 | |
| Kim Reynolds † | November 24, 1989 | DF | United States | 2016 | 0 | 0 | N/A | |
| Ali Riley | October 30, 1987 | DF | New Zealand | 2020–2021 | 24 | 0 | April 10, 2021 | |
| Parker Roberts | July 30, 1997 | MF | United States | 2021–2022 | 6 | 0 | September 11, 2021 | |
| Emily Sams | July 1, 1999 | DF | United States | 2023–2025 | 84 | 1 | March 26, 2023 | |
| Lianne Sanderson | February 3, 1988 | FW | England | 2016 | 8 | 2 | April 17, 2016 | |
| Zandy Soree † | August 1, 1998 | MF | Belgium | 2020 | 0 | 0 | N/A | |
| **Rafaelle Souza** | June 18, 1991 | DF | Brazil | 2023–present | 50 | 2 | August 20, 2023 | |
| Jasmyne Spencer | August 27, 1990 | FW | United States | 2016–2017 | 41 | 7 | April 17, 2016 | |
| Jodie Taylor | May 17, 1986 | FW | England | 2021 | 13 | 3 | July 24, 2021 | |
| Crystal Thomas | January 18, 1994 | FW | United States | 2021 | 10 | 0 | May 10, 2021 | |
| Amy Turner | July 4, 1991 | DF | England | 2021–2022 | 19 | 1 | July 4, 2021 | |
| Erika Tymrak | August 7, 1991 | MF | United States | 2021–2023 | 61 | 2 | April 10, 2021 | |
| Chioma Ubogagu | September 10, 1992 | FW | England | 2017–2019 | 58 | 12 | April 15, 2017 | |
| Savanah Uveges | June 9, 1996 | MF | United States | 2020 | 2 | 0 | September 26, 2020 | |
| Emily van Egmond | July 12, 1993 | MF | Australia | 2018–2021 | 27 | 0 | April 28, 2018 | |
| Marisa Viggiano | February 5, 1997 | MF | United States | 2019–2021 | 48 | 4 | April 27, 2019 | |
| **Viviana Villacorta** | February 2, 1999 | MF | United States | 2021–present | 50 | 0 | May 1, 2022 | |
| Chelsee Washington | November 17, 1997 | MF | United States | 2020–2022 | 18 | 0 | September 19, 2020 | |
| **Solai Washington** | October 1, 2005 | FW | Jamaica | 2026–present | 20 | 0 | March 15, 2026 | |
| Ally Watt | March 12, 1997 | FW | United States | 2022–2025 | 85 | 9 | August 20, 2022 | |
| Dani Weatherholt | March 17, 1994 | MF | United States | 2016–2019 | 74 | 3 | April 17, 2016 | |
| Claire Winter | March 21, 1995 | MF | United States | 2024 | 2 | 0 | July 20, 2024 | |
| Allie Wisner † | October 12, 1990 | FW | United States | 2016 | 0 | 0 | N/A | |
| Sam Witteman | February 26, 1994 | DF | United States | 2016 | 16 | 0 | May 1, 2016 | |
| **Summer Yates** | June 17, 2000 | MF | United States | 2023–present | 88 | 8 | March 26, 2023 | |
| Shelina Zadorsky | October 24, 1992 | DF | Canada | 2018–2020 | 39 | 1 | April 15, 2018 | |

=== Goalkeepers ===
| Name | D.O.B. | Position | Nationality | Years | Games | Conceded | Shutouts | Debut | Ref |
|---|---|---|---|---|---|---|---|---|---|
| **Kat Asman** | May 19, 2000 | GK | United States | 2025–present | 0 | 0 | 0 | N/A | |
| Aubrey Bledsoe | November 20, 1991 | GK | United States | 2016–2017 | 12 | 17 | 2 | May 28, 2016 | |
| Lainey Burdett | December 22, 1996 | GK | United States | 2019 | 1 | 3 | 0 | October 5, 2019 | |
| Kenna Caldwell † | August 29, 2000 | GK | United States | 2024 | 0 | 0 | 0 | N/A | |
| Kaylie Collins | May 17, 1998 | GK | United States | 2021–2024 | 3 | 7 | 0 | April 23, 2022 | |
| **McKinley Crone** | October 20, 1998 | GK | United States | 2023–present | 3 | 3 | 0 | July 20, 2024 | |
| Megan Dorsey † | January 16, 1992 | GK | United States | 2016 | 0 | 0 | 0 | N/A | |
| Gabby English † | November 21, 1996 | GK | United States | 2021 | 0 | 0 | 0 | N/A | |
| Ashlyn Harris | October 19, 1985 | GK | United States | 2016–2021 | 89 | 134 | 18 | April 17, 2016 | |
| Haley Kopmeyer | June 28, 1990 | GK | United States | 2018–2019 | 13 | 25 | 1 | June 3, 2018 | |
| Sofia Manner | September 11, 1997 | GK | Finland | 2024 | 1 | 2 | 0 | July 28, 2024 | |
| **Cara Martin** | February 11, 2004 | GK | United States | 2026–present | 0 | 0 | 0 | N/A | |
| Erin McLeod | February 26, 1983 | GK | Canada | 2020–2022 | 28 | 49 | 6 | May 22, 2021 | |
| **Anna Moorhouse** | March 30, 1995 | GK | England | 2022–present | 103 | 126 | 35 | March 30, 2022 | |
| **Cosette Morché** | June 9, 1997 | GK | United States | 2025–present | 9 | 13 | 2 | September 17, 2025 | |
| Carly Nelson | February 11, 1998 | GK | United States | 2023 | 4 | 5 | 0 | April 19, 2023 | |
| Kelly Rowswell † | January 28, 1998 | GK | United States | 2022 | 0 | 0 | 0 | N/A | |
| Kaitlyn Savage | October 27, 1990 | GK | United States | 2016 | 4 | 8 | 0 | July 10, 2016 | |
| Sarah Shimer † | December 11, 1995 | GK | United States | 2018 | 0 | 0 | 0 | N/A | |
| Caroline Stanley | March 16, 1993 | GK | United States | 2017 | 1 | 1 | 0 | May 21, 2017 | |
| Libby Stout † | June 16, 1990 | GK | United States | 2018 | 0 | 0 | 0 | N/A | |
| Brittany Wilson | September 22, 1997 | GK | United States | 2020–2021 | 1 | 2 | 0 | October 9, 2020 | |

== By nationality ==
In total, 126 players representing 18 different countries have played for Orlando Pride.

Note: Countries indicate national team as defined under FIFA eligibility rules. Players may hold more than one non-FIFA nationality.

| Country | Total players |
|---|---|
| Australia | 5 |
| Argentina | 1 |
| Brazil | 11 |
| Canada | 8 |
| England | 6 |
| Finland | 1 |
| Iceland | 1 |
| Jamaica | 3 |
| Malta | 1 |
| Mexico | 3 |
| New Zealand | 1 |
| Nigeria | 2 |
| Norway | 1 |
| Puerto Rico | 1 |
| Scotland | 1 |
| Spain | 2 |
| Sweden | 1 |
| United States | 82 |
| Wales | 1 |
| Zambia | 2 |

== Sources ==
- NWSL player list
