= 2020 Orlando Pride season =

Orlando Pride
2020 season
- CEO: Alex Leitão
- Head coach: Marc Skinner
- Stadium: Exploria Stadium; Orlando, Florida
- NWSL: Not contested
- Challenge Cup: Withdrew
- Top goalscorer: Marisa Viggiano (2)
Home colors	Away colors

The 2020 Orlando Pride season was Orlando Pride's fifth season in the National Women's Soccer League, the top division of women's soccer in the United States.

== Notable events ==
In October 2019, Alex Morgan announced she was pregnant and expecting to give birth in April 2020. Morgan had stated she aimed to return to playing in time for the Olympics with the United States in July 2020 but the games were eventually postponed by COVID-19. Morgan gave birth on May 7, 2020.

Five Pride players signed with Australian W-League teams to play with during the 2019–20 NWSL offseason: Emily van Egmond and Claire Emslie joined Melbourne City, Alanna Kennedy joined Sydney FC, Carson Pickett joined Brisbane Roar and Camila joined Canberra United. Van Egmond and Emslie won both the Premiership and Championship titles with Melbourne City as van Egmond also led the team in goals with six.

On November 5, 2019, Orlando used its top priority to acquire the NWSL rights to Australian midfielder Chloe Logarzo off the NWSL Re-Entry Wire. On November 13, the pick was voided after the league realized Logarzo should not have been made available for selection and allowed to go through the re-entry process. The Pride was not offered compensation. Logarzo subsequently signed in England with Bristol City.

In January 2020, the Pride announced that NWSL President Amanda Duffy was to step down in order to become the team's Executive Vice President. General Manager Erik Ustruck returned to Orlando City's front office staff after only a year in the role.

In March, the start of the season was delayed indefinitely due to the coronavirus pandemic. On May 8, the NWSL allowed voluntary individual workouts on outdoor fields for the first time since the suspension.

On May 27, 2020, the NWSL announced the 2020 NWSL Challenge Cup as a smaller format replacement to the league, a 25-game tournament hosted at Zions Bank Stadium in Herriman, Utah, beginning June 27, 71 days after the originally planned start date of the regular season. On June 22, the team withdrew from the tournament following positive COVID-19 tests among both players and staff.

Orlando ultimately played for the first time in 2020 on September 19 as part of the Fall Series friendlies, 343 days since the team's last match on October 12, 2019.

== Roster ==
As of September 19, 2020.

No.	Nationality	Name	Position(s)	Date of birth (age)	Previous club	Notes
Goalkeepers
24	(United States)	Ashlyn Harris	GK	October 19, 1985 (aged 34)	(United States) Washington Spirit	FED
30	(United States)	Brittany Wilson	GK	September 22, 1997 (aged 22)	(United States) Denver Pioneers	–
Defenders
3	(United States)	Toni Pressley	DF	February 19, 1990 (aged 30)	(United States) Houston Dash	–
11	(United States)	Ali Krieger	DF	July 28, 1984 (aged 36)	(United States) Washington Spirit	FED
17	(United States)	Carrie Lawrence	DF	July 15, 1997 (aged 23)	(United States) UCF Knights	Short-term
21	(United States)	Julie King	DF	October 21, 1989 (aged 30)	(United States) North Carolina Courage	SUP
25	(Jamaica)	Konya Plummer	DF	August 2, 1997 (aged 23)	(United States) UCF Knights	INT
27	(United States)	Morgan Reid	DF	June 13, 1995 (aged 25)	(United States) North Carolina Courage	D45
28	(United States)	Courtney Petersen	DF	October 28, 1997 (aged 22)	(United States) Virginia Cavaliers	–
32	(Canada)	Ally Haran	DF	May 21, 1996 (aged 24)	(United States) Houston Dash	Short-term
Midfielders
5	(United States)	Savanah Uveges	MF	June 9, 1996 (aged 24)	(United States) Nebraska Cornhuskers	Short-term
8	(Jamaica)	Deneisha Blackwood	MF	March 7, 1997 (aged 23)	(Czech Republic) Slavia Prague	INT, Short-term
12	(United States)	Kristen Edmonds	MF	May 22, 1987 (aged 33)	(United States) Western New York Flash	–
16	(Belgium)	Zandy Soree	MF	August 1, 1998 (aged 22)	(United States) UCF Knights	Short-term
19	(Canada)	Jordyn Listro	MF	August 10, 1995 (aged 25)	(Spain) UDG Tenerife	INT, Short-term
20	(United States)	Abby Elinsky	MF	January 8, 1996 (aged 24)	(France) ASPTT Albi	SUP
23	(United States)	Marisa Viggiano	MF	February 5, 1997 (aged 23)	(United States) Northwestern Wildcats	SUP
31	(United States)	Chelsee Washington	MF	November 17, 1997 (aged 22)	(United States) Bowling Green Falcons	–
Forwards
2	(United States)	Sydney Leroux	FW	May 7, 1990 (aged 30)	(United States) FC Kansas City	–
10	(Brazil)	Marta	FW	February 19, 1986 (aged 34)	(Sweden) FC Rosengård	INT
14	(United States)	Kate Howarth	FW	July 3, 1991 (aged 29)	(United States) New England Mutiny	Short-term

== Staff ==
As of February 14, 2020.

Executive
Majority owner and chairman	(Brazil) Flávio Augusto da Silva
Chief executive officer	(Brazil) Alex Leitão
Executive vice president	(United States) Amanda Duffy
Coaching staff
Head coach	(England) Marc Skinner
Assistant coach	(England) Carl Green
Goalkeeping coach	(England) Lloyd Yaxley

== Match results ==
=== Preseason ===
As per the league schedule, NWSL teams were permitted to begin preseason activities on March 9, 2020. Orlando Pride were due to play three friendlies in preseason, all against Florida college teams. However, on March 12 it was announced that the NWSL's preseason schedule had been canceled on the advice of public health authorities due to the coronavirus pandemic.

March 24	Florida State Seminoles	Canceled	Orlando Pride	Tallahassee, Florida
3:30pm				Stadium: Seminole Soccer Complex

April 4	UCF Knights	Canceled	Orlando Pride	Orlando, Florida
12:00pm				Stadium: UCF Soccer and Track Stadium

April 11	Orlando Pride	Canceled	South Florida Bulls	Sanford, Florida
				Stadium: Sylvan Lake Park; Attendance: Closed-door

=== National Women's Soccer League ===
Results

April 19 1	Orlando Pride	Canceled	Sky Blue FC	Orlando, Florida
5:00pm				Stadium: Exploria Stadium

April 24 2	Utah Royals	Canceled	Orlando Pride	Sandy, Utah
10:00pm				Stadium: Rio Tinto Stadium

May 2 3	Orlando Pride	Canceled	North Carolina Courage	Orlando, Florida
7:30pm				Stadium: Exploria Stadium

May 6 4	Portland Thorns	Canceled	Orlando Pride	Portland, Oregon
10:30pm				Stadium: Providence Park

May 17 5	Chicago Red Stars	Canceled	Orlando Pride	Bridgeview, Illinois
6:00pm				Stadium: SeatGeek Stadium

May 23 6	North Carolina Courage	Canceled	Orlando Pride	Cary, North Carolina
7:00pm				Stadium: WakeMed Soccer Park

May 27 7	Orlando Pride	Canceled	Houston Dash	Orlando, Florida
7:00pm				Stadium: Exploria Stadium

May 30 8	Washington Spirit	Canceled	Orlando Pride	Leesburg, Virginia
7:00pm				Stadium: Segra Field

June 13 9	Utah Royals	Canceled	Orlando Pride	Sandy, Utah
10:30pm				Stadium: Rio Tinto Stadium

June 19 10	OL Reign	Canceled	Orlando Pride	Tacoma, Washington
10:00pm				Stadium: Cheney Stadium

June 26 11	Orlando Pride	Canceled	Washington Spirit	Orlando, Florida
7:00pm				Stadium: Exploria Stadium

July 5 12	Orlando Pride	Canceled	Portland Thorns	Orlando, Florida
5:00pm				Stadium: Exploria Stadium

July 12 13	Orlando Pride	Canceled	OL Reign	Orlando, Florida
5:00pm				Stadium: Exploria Stadium

July 18 14	Chicago Red Stars	Canceled	Orlando Pride	Bridgeview, Illinois
8:00pm				Stadium: SeatGeek Stadium

August 2 15	Orlando Pride	Canceled	Utah Royals	Orlando, Florida
5:00pm				Stadium: Exploria Stadium

August 7 16	Orlando Pride	Canceled	Sky Blue FC	Orlando, Florida
7:00pm				Stadium: Exploria Stadium

August 15 17	Portland Thorns	Canceled	Orlando Pride	Portland, Oregon
10:30pm				Stadium: Providence Park

August 21 18	Orlando Pride	Canceled	OL Reign	Orlando, Florida
7:00pm				Stadium: Exploria Stadium

August 30 19	Orlando Pride	Canceled	Houston Dash	Orlando, Florida
5:00pm				Stadium: Exploria Stadium

September 9 20	Washington Spirit	Canceled	Orlando Pride	Germantown, Maryland
7:30pm				Stadium: Maryland SoccerPlex

September 12 21	Houston Dash	Canceled	Orlando Pride	Houston, Texas
7:00pm				Stadium: BBVA Stadium

September 25 22	Orlando Pride	Canceled	Chicago Red Stars	Orlando, Florida
7:00pm				Stadium: Exploria Stadium

October 3 23	Sky Blue FC	Canceled	Orlando Pride	Harrison, New Jersey
6:00pm				Stadium: Red Bull Arena

October 10 24	Orlando Pride	Canceled	North Carolina Courage	Orlando, Florida
7:30pm				Stadium: Exploria Stadium

=== 2020 NWSL Challenge Cup ===
The format of the tournament was supposed to feature all nine NWSL clubs each playing four games in the preliminary rounds to determine seeding. The top eight teams would advance to a knockout bracket. The draw for the preliminary round was held on June 1, randomly assigning teams to their opposition via seeding. Orlando were drawn against Chicago, Portland and North Carolina, the top three placed teams from the previous season as well as Sky Blue. However, on June 22, the team confirmed they would be withdrawing from the tournament following positive COVID-19 tests among both players and staff.

June 27 Preliminary round	Chicago Red Stars	Withdrew	Orlando Pride	Herriman, Utah
10:00pm				Stadium: Zions Bank Stadium

July 1 Preliminary round	Portland Thorns	Withdrew	Orlando Pride	Herriman, Utah
12:30pm				Stadium: Zions Bank Stadium

July 5 Preliminary round	North Carolina Courage	Withdrew	Orlando Pride	Herriman, Utah
10:00pm				Stadium: Zions Bank Stadium

July 9 Preliminary round	Orlando Pride	Withdrew	Sky Blue FC	Herriman, Utah
10:00pm				Stadium: Zions Bank Stadium

=== Fall Series ===
To compensate for the lack of competitive schedule and difficulty of travel, the NWSL grouped teams into regional pods to allow for a Fall Series in September and October. Orlando were grouped in the south region with reigning NWSL champions North Carolina and 2020 Challenge Cup winners Houston.

September 19	North Carolina Courage	0–0	Orlando Pride	Cary, North Carolina
1:00pm	Roccaro (yellow card) 10'	Report	Listro (yellow card) 35'	Stadium: WakeMed Soccer Park; Attendance: Behind-closed-doors; Referee: Kevin Broadley

September 26	Houston Dash	3–1	Orlando Pride	Houston, Texas
8:30pm	Prince 27'; Schmidt 55' (pen.); Groom 72'	Report	Viggiano 45+3', (yellow card) 54'; Blackwood (yellow card) 48'; Listro (yellow card) 68'	Stadium: BBVA Stadium; Referee: Alyssa Nichols

October 9	Orlando Pride	1–2	Houston Dash	Kissimmee, Florida
5:00pm	Washington (yellow card) 37'; Leroux 47', (yellow card) 54'	Report	Groom 13'; Latsko 29'; Hanson (yellow card) 45+1'	Stadium: Osceola County Stadium; Attendance: Behind-closed-doors; Referee: Alex Billeter

October 17	Orlando Pride	3–3	North Carolina Courage	Orlando, Florida
4:00pm	Krieger (yellow card) 15'; Viggiano 54'; Edmonds 71'; Listro (yellow card) 85'; Haran 90+2'	Report	Debinha 19', 45+6'; L. Williams 45+5'	Stadium: Exploria Stadium; Attendance: Behind-closed-doors; Referee: Natalie Simon

== Squad statistics ==
=== Appearances ===
As of matches played October 17, 2020

No.	Pos.	Name	Fall	
No.	Pos.	Name	Apps	Starts
2	FW	(United States) Sydney Leroux	3	3
3	DF	(United States) Toni Pressley	4	3
5	MF	(United States) Savanah Uveges	2	1
8	MF	(Jamaica) Deneisha Blackwood	4	2
10	FW	(Brazil) Marta	4	4
11	DF	(United States) Ali Krieger	4	4
12	MF	(United States) Kristen Edmonds	3	3
14	FW	(United States) Kate Howarth	2	0
16	MF	(Belgium) Zandy Soree	0	0
17	DF	(United States) Carrie Lawrence	4	3
19	MF	(Canada) Jordyn Listro	3	3
20	MF	(United States) Abby Elinsky	4	3
21	DF	(United States) Julie King	0	0
23	MF	(United States) Marisa Viggiano	4	4
24	GK	(United States) Ashlyn Harris	3	3
25	DF	(Jamaica) Konya Plummer	2	1
27	DF	(United States) Morgan Reid	0	0
28	DF	(United States) Courtney Petersen	4	4
30	GK	(United States) Brittany Wilson	1	1
31	MF	(United States) Chelsee Washington	4	2
32	DF	(Canada) Ally Haran	2	0

=== Goalscorers ===
As of matches played October 17, 2020

Rank	No.	Pos.	Name	Fall
1	23	MF	(United States) Marisa Viggiano	2
2	2	FW	(United States) Sydney Leroux	1
2	12	MF	(United States) Kristen Edmonds	1
2	32	DF	(Canada) Ally Haran	1
Total				5

=== Shutouts ===
As of matches played October 17, 2020

Rank	No.	Name	Fall
1	24	(United States) Ashlyn Harris	1
Total			1

=== Disciplinary record ===
As of matches played October 17, 2020

No.	Pos.	Name	Fall	
No.	Pos.	Name	Yellow card	Red card
2	FW	(United States) Sydney Leroux	1	0
8	MF	(Jamaica) Deneisha Blackwood	1	0
11	DF	(United States) Ali Krieger	1	0
19	MF	(Canada) Jordyn Listro	3	0
23	MF	(United States) Marisa Viggiano	1	0
31	MF	(United States) Chelsee Washington	1	0
Total			8	0

== Transfers and loans ==
=== 2020 NWSL College Draft ===
Draft picks are not automatically signed to the team roster. The 2020 college draft was held on January 16, 2020. Orlando had seven selections.

Round	Pick	Player	Pos.	College	Status
1	3	(United States) Taylor Kornieck	MF	University of Colorado	Signed
1	7	(United States) Courtney Petersen	DF	University of Virginia	Signed
2	10	(Jamaica) Konya Plummer	DF	University of Central Florida	Signed
2	14	(United States) Phoebe McClernon	DF	University of Virginia	Short-term (Note: Signed short-term contract for NWSL Challenge Cup)
3	21	(United States) Cheyenne Shorts	DF	(Colorado) University of Denver	Short-term
3	26	(United States) Abi Kim	FW	University of California, Berkeley	Not signed
4	30	(United States) Chelsee Washington	MF	(Ohio) Bowling Green State University	Signed

=== Transfers in ===
Date	Player	Pos.	Previous club	Fee/notes	Ref.
January 8, 2020	(United States) Emily Sonnett	DF	(United States) Portland Thorns FC	Acquired in trade with the No. 7 and No. 14 picks in the 2020 NWSL Draft in exchange for Orlando's No. 1 overall pick.	
January 8, 2020	(Australia) Caitlin Foord (NWSL rights only) (Note: Elected to sign outside NWSL with Arsenal)	FW	(United States) Portland Thorns FC	Acquired in trade with the No. 7 and No. 14 picks in the 2020 NWSL Draft in exchange for Orlando's No. 1 overall pick.	
January 10, 2020	(United States) Carrie Lawrence	DF	(United States) UCF Knights	Signed to supplemental roster	
February 10, 2020	(New Zealand) Ali Riley	DF	(Germany) Bayern Munich	Signed via transfer using Allocation Money	
February 14, 2020	(Canada) Erin McLeod	GK	(Sweden) Växjö DFF	Free agent signing	
April 1, 2020	(England) Jade Moore	MF	(England) Reading	Signed via transfer using Allocation Money	
June 21, 2020	(United States) Brittany Wilson	GK	(United States) Denver Pioneers	Free agent signing, initially short-term contract for NWSL Challenge Cup but re-signed through 2021 in September.	
September 8, 2020	(United States) Carrie Lawrence	DF	(United States) Orlando Pride	Free agent signing, short-term contract for Fall Series	
September 8, 2020	(Canada) Ally Haran	DF	(United States) Houston Dash	Free agent signing, short-term contract for Fall Series	
September 8, 2020	(Belgium) Zandy Soree	MF	(United States) UCF Knights	Free agent signing, short-term contract for Fall Series	
September 8, 2020	(Jamaica) Deneisha Blackwood	MF	(Czech Republic) Slavia Prague	Free agent signing, short-term contract for Fall Series	
September 8, 2020	(Canada) Jordyn Listro	MF	(Spain) UDG Tenerife	Free agent signing, short-term contract for Fall Series	
September 8, 2020	(United States) Savanah Uveges	MF	(United States) Nebraska Cornhuskers	Free agent signing, short-term contract for Fall Series	
September 8, 2020	(United States) Kate Howarth	FW	(United States) New England Mutiny	Free agent signing, short-term contract for Fall Series	

=== Transfers out ===
Date	Player	Pos.	Destination club	Fee/notes	Ref.
Unknown	(Jamaica) Alika Keene	DF	(Lithuania) Gintra Universitetas	2019 National Team Replacement contract expired	
Unknown	(United States) Hana Kerner	DF	(France) Stade de Reims	2019 National Team Replacement contract expired	
January 10, 2020	(United States) Danica Evans	FW	(Spain) Sporting de Huelva	Waived	
January 16, 2020	(United States) Rachel Hill	FW	(United States) Chicago Red Stars	Traded with a third-round (No. 19) pick in the 2020 NWSL Draft, Orlando's natural first-round selection in the 2021 NWSL Draft and $50,000 of allocation money in exchange for a first-round (No. 3) and third-round (No. 26) pick in the 2020 NWSL Draft.	
January 22, 2020	(United States) Dani Weatherholt	MF	(United States) Reign FC	Traded in exchange for a second-round pick in the 2021 NWSL Draft.	
February 4, 2020	(United States) Haley Kopmeyer	GK		Waived	
February 26, 2020	(United States) Joanna Boyles	MF	Retired	Retired	
June 21, 2020	(United States) Bridget Callahan	MF		Waived	
June 21, 2020	(United States) Carrie Lawrence	DF	(United States) Orlando Pride	Waived (re-signed on September 8 for Fall Series)	
June 21, 2020	(United States) Lainey Burdett	GK	(Finland) Åland United	Waived	
July 30, 2020	(United States) Cheyenne Shorts	DF	(Scotland) Celtic	End of short-term contract	
August 5, 2020	(United States) Erin Greening	DF	(Norway) Klepp IL	Waived	
August 13, 2020	(United States) Phoebe McClernon	DF	(Sweden) Växjö DFF	Released from short-term contract to sign abroad	
August 18, 2020	(United States) Emily Sonnett	DF	(Sweden) Kopparbergs/Göteborg FC	Federation player, opted to sign outside the league	
September 12, 2020	(United States) Caitlin Farrell	FW		Removed from roster, did not report	
September 12, 2020	(United States) Alex Morgan	FW	(England) Tottenham Hotspur	Federation player, opted to sign outside the league	

=== Loans out ===
Date	Player	Pos.	Loaned to	Notes	Ref.
July 13, 2020	(New Zealand) Ali Riley	DF	(Sweden) FC Rosengård	Until November 30, 2020, with right of recall	
August 12, 2020	(Brazil) Camila	MF	(Brazil) Palmeiras	Until December 22, 2020	
August 14, 2020	(Canada) Erin McLeod	GK	(Iceland) Stjarnan	Until October 20, 2020	
August 18, 2020	(England) Jade Moore	MF	(Spain) Atlético Madrid	Until February 15, 2021, with right of recall	
August 20, 2020	(Canada) Shelina Zadorsky	DF	(England) Tottenham Hotspur	Until December 31, 2020	
August 20, 2020	(Australia) Alanna Kennedy	DF	(England) Tottenham Hotspur	Until December 31, 2020	
August 20, 2020	(United States) Carson Pickett	DF	(Cyprus) Apollon Limassol	Until November 20, 2020	
August 22, 2020	(Scotland) Claire Emslie	FW	(England) Everton	Until December 31, 2020	
August 28, 2020	(Australia) Emily van Egmond	MF	(England) West Ham United	Until December 31, 2020	
August 31, 2020	(United States) Taylor Kornieck	MF	(Germany) MSV Duisburg	Until December 31, 2020	

=== Preseason trialists ===
Orlando Pride began preseason training on March 9, 2020. The squad included six non-roster invitees on trial with the team during preseason. In June, Brittany Wilson was signed to a short-term contract for the 2020 NWSL Challenge Cup before being signed through 2021 with an option for the 2022 season in September.

2020 Orlando Pride trialists
Player	Position	Previous team
(United States) Jaelyn Cunningham	GK	(United States) Illinois Fighting Illini
(United States) Brittany Wilson	GK	(United States) Denver Pioneers
(United States) Madison Duncan	DF	(Czech Republic) 1. FC Slovácko
(Canada) Jordyn Listro	MF	(Spain) UDG Tenerife
(United States) Savanah Uveges	MF	(United States) Nebraska Cornhuskers
(United States) Kate Howarth	FW	(United States) New England Mutiny

Signed to first team contract.
Signed to short-term contract for NWSL Challenge Cup.
Signed to short-term contract for Fall Series.
