= Zandy Soree =

US-born Belgian footballer

Personal information
- Full name: Alexandra Genevieve Soree
- Date of birth: 1 August 1998 (age 28)
- Place of birth: Weston, Florida, United States
- Height: 1.68 m (5 ft 6 in)
- Position: Midfielder

Team information
- Current team: Afturelding
- Number: 17

Youth career
- American Heritage HS

College career
Years	Team	Apps	(Gls)
2016–2019	UCF Knights	67	(14)

Senior career*
Years	Team	Apps	(Gls)
2020	Orlando Pride	0	(0)
2021	Houston Dash	0	(0)
2021–2022	Breiðablik	2	(0)
2022–	Afturelding	2	(0)

International career^{‡}
2014	Belgium U17	3	(3)
2017	Belgium U19	5	(0)
2017–	Belgium	4	(0)
- * Club domestic league appearances and goals as of 18 May 2022 ‡ National team caps and goals as of 10 March 2020

Alexandra Genevieve "Zandy" Soree (born 1 August 1998) is an American-born Belgian footballer who plays as a midfielder for Afturelding of the Icelandic Besta deild kvenna and the Belgium national team.

== Early life ==
Soree was raised in Weston, Florida and was a four-time state champion with American Heritage HS. In 2013 she attended the U.S. Youth Soccer Olympic Developmental Program.

=== UCF Knights ===
Soree played college soccer for the UCF Knights between 2016 and 2019. In her rookie year she was named to the AAC All-Rookie team and was a Second Team All-Conference selection as a senior in 2019.

== Club career ==
=== Orlando Pride ===
Soree declared for the 2020 NWSL College Draft but was not selected. On 8 September 2020, with the 2020 NWSL season dealing with significant disruption during the COVID-19 pandemic, Soree was one of seven players signed to a short-term contract with Orlando Pride in order to compete in the Fall Series following the team's decision to loan out 11 senior players to play regularly overseas. She was named as a substitute in one matchday squad but did not make an appearance for the team.

=== Houston Dash ===
Having spent preseason on trial with Houston Dash ahead of the 2021 season, Soree was signed to a National Team Replacement contract on 5 April 2021 but did not make an appearance for the team.

=== Breiðablik ===
In September 2021, Soree joined Breiðablik of the Icelandic Úrvalsdeild. Although the 2021 domestic season had already concluded, Soree was registered for the team's squad during the 2021–22 UEFA Women's Champions League group stage. Soree played in all six games against Paris Saint-Germain, Real Madrid and Zhytlobud-1 Kharkiv as Breiðablik finished bottom of the group.

== International career ==
=== Youth ===
Soree has dual citizenship of both the United States, her country of birth, and Belgium, her father's country of birth. She first represented Belgium in 2014 during 2015 UEFA Women's Under-17 Championship qualification, appearing in all three qualifying round group games and scoring three goals. In 2017, Soree stepped up to the under-19s, playing in double-header friendlies against Switzerland in April 207 before competing in the 2017 UEFA Women's Under-19 Championship qualification elite round. Belgium failed to qualify, finishing second in the group to eventual tournament winners Spain.

=== Senior ===
Soree made her senior debut on 19 January 2017 in a friendly against France. She didn't return to the squad until the 2019 Cyprus Women's Cup, making two appearances as Belgium finished third, beating Austria on penalties in the third-place playoff. In 2020, Soree was included in the 2020 Algarve Cup squad, making one appearance against Denmark.

== Career statistics ==
=== Club ===
As of 18 May 2022.

Club	Season	League			National Cup (Note: NWSL Challenge Cup)		League Cup (Note: Icelandic Women's Football League Cup)		Continental (Note: UEFA Women's Champions League)		Other		Total	
Club	Season	Division	Apps	Goals	Apps	Goals	Apps	Goals	Apps	Goals	Apps	Goals	Apps	Goals
Orlando Pride	2020	NWSL	0	0	0	0	—		—		—		0	0
Houston Dash	2021	NWSL	0	0	0	0	—		—		—		0	0
Breiðablik	2021	Besta deild kvenna	—		—		—		6	0	—		6	0
Breiðablik	2022	Besta deild kvenna	2	0	0	0	7	2	0	0	1 (Note: Icelandic Super Cup)	0	10	2
Breiðablik	Career total		2	0	0	0	7	2	6	0	1	0	16	2
Afturelding	2022	Besta deild kvenna	2	0	0	0	0	0	—		—		2	0
Career total			4	0	0	0	7	2	6	0	1	0	18	2
