= Uveges =

Uveges is a surname. Notable people with the surname include:

- Savanah Uveges (born 1996), American soccer coach
- Szabolcs Üveges (born 1991), Hungarian footballer
