= Courtney Petersen =

American soccer player (born 1997)

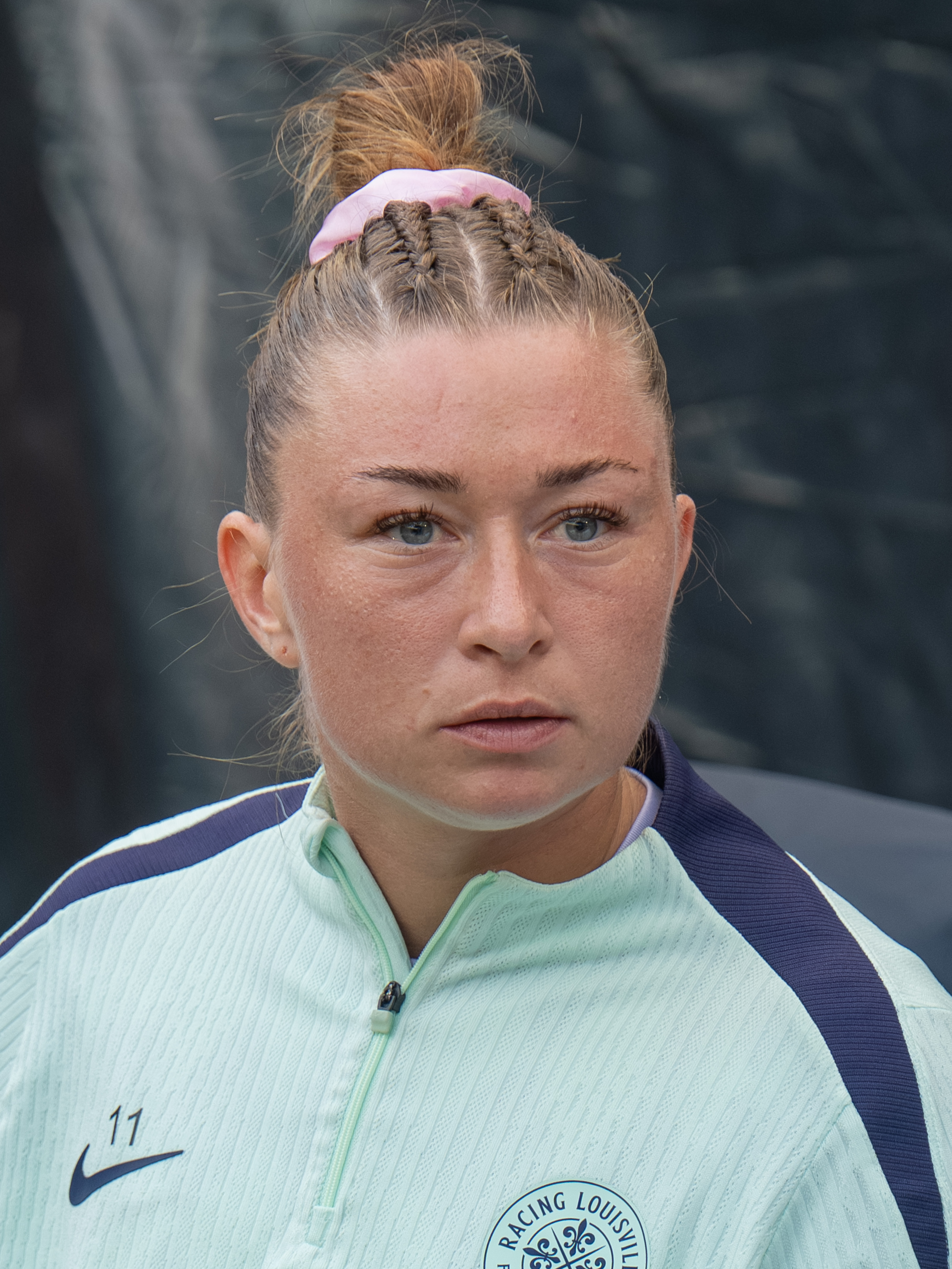
- Petersen with Racing Louisville in 2025

Personal information
- Full name: Courtney Lynn Petersen
- Date of birth: October 28, 1997 (age 29)
- Place of birth: Royal Oak, Michigan, United States
- Height: 5 ft 5 in (1.65 m)
- Positions: Left back; center back

Team information
- Current team: Racing Louisville
- Number: 8

Youth career
- Michigan Hawks ECNL

College career
Years	Team	Apps	(Gls)
2015–2019	Virginia Cavaliers	78	(5)

Senior career*
Years	Team	Apps	(Gls)
2018–2019	Motor City FC	15	(3)
2020–2022	Orlando Pride	41	(1)
2023–2024	Houston Dash	29	(0)
2024–	Racing Louisville	51	(0)

International career
- United States U14
- United States U15
- United States U17
2016	United States U20		
- * Club domestic league appearances and goals as of 05:57, November 2, 2026 (UTC)

Courtney Lynn Petersen (born October 28, 1997) is an American professional soccer player who plays as a left back or center back for Racing Louisville FC of the National Women's Soccer League (NWSL). She played college soccer for the Virginia Cavaliers. She was selected by the Orlando Pride in the first round of the 2020 NWSL draft.

== Early life ==
Growing up in Canton, Michigan, Petersen played youth soccer as a midfielder for Michigan Hawks ECNL and was voted to numerous ECNL Top-11 squads. In 2014 she was named as an NSCAA Youth All-American. Coming out of high school, Petersen ranked as the No. 23 recruit in the nation by TopDrawerSoccer.com.

=== Virginia Cavaliers ===
In October 2013, Petersen committed to playing college soccer at the University of Virginia. She played four seasons for the Virginia Cavaliers between 2015 and 2019, sitting out the 2016 season to focus fully on national team duty for the 2016 FIFA U-20 Women's World Cup. Predominantly a left-sided full-back, Petersen proved to be a versatile player during her collegiate career, also playing in midfield. As a freshman she scored a career-high three goals and added another three assists in 22 appearances, ending the year as an ACC All-Freshman team selection. In her senior year, Petersen was an All-Region First Team selection by United Soccer Coaches, a TopDrawerSoccer Best XI Second Team selection and an All-ACC Second Team selection.

In the 2018 and 2019 offseasons, Petersen played with hometown WPSL side Motor City FC.

== Professional career ==
=== Orlando Pride, 2020–2022 ===
Petersen was selected in the first round (7th overall) of the 2020 NWSL College Draft by Orlando Pride. She signed with the team in March but with the season disrupted by the COVID-19 pandemic, was unable to make her debut until September 19, 2020, in the first Fall Series match, starting in a 0–0 draw with North Carolina Courage. She appeared in all four Fall Series matches, playing the full 90 minutes in each.

=== Houston Dash, 2023–2024 ===
Petersen had a contract offer extended to her by Orlando at the end of the 2022 season but in February 2023, the club agreed to trade her rights to Houston Dash along with a natural third-round pick in the 2024 NWSL Draft in exchange for $65,000 in allocation money plus an additional $25,000, pending conditions met.

=== Racing Louisville, 2024– ===
On August 31, 2024, Petersen was traded from the Houston Dash to Racing Louisville FC in exchange for $45,000 in league allocation money.

== International career ==
Petersen has represented the United States at under-14, under-15, under-17 and under-20 levels, mainly playing as a midfielder. In 2016, Petersen competed at the 2016 FIFA U-20 Women's World Cup, playing two games as the team finished fourth.

== Career statistics ==
=== College ===
School	Season	Division	Apps	Goals
Virginia Cavaliers	2015	Div. I	22	3
Virginia Cavaliers	2016	Div. I	0	0
Virginia Cavaliers	2017	Div. I	22	1
Virginia Cavaliers	2018	Div. I	15	0
Virginia Cavaliers	2019	Div. I	19	1
Career total			78	5

=== Club ===
As of match played July 6, 2024.

Club	Season	League			Cup (Note: NWSL Challenge Cup)		Playoffs		Other		Total	
Club	Season	Division	Apps	Goals	Apps	Goals	Apps	Goals	Apps	Goals	Apps	Goals
Motor City FC	2018	WPSL	3	3	—		—		—		3	3
Motor City FC	2019	WPSL	12	0	—		—		—		12	0
Motor City FC	Total		15	3	0	0	0	0	0	0	15	3
Orlando Pride	2020	NWSL	—		—		—		4 (Note: Includes the NWSL Fall Series)	0	4	0
Orlando Pride	2021	NWSL	22	1	3	0	—		—		25	1
Orlando Pride	2022	NWSL	19	0	6	0	—		—		25	0
Orlando Pride	Total		41	1	9	0	0	0	4	0	54	1
Houston Dash	2023	NWSL	13	0	5	0	0	0	—		18	0
Houston Dash	2024	NWSL	12	0	—		0	0	—		12	0
Career total			81	4	14	0	0	0	4	0	99	4
