= Deneisha Blackwood =

Jamaican footballer (born 1997)

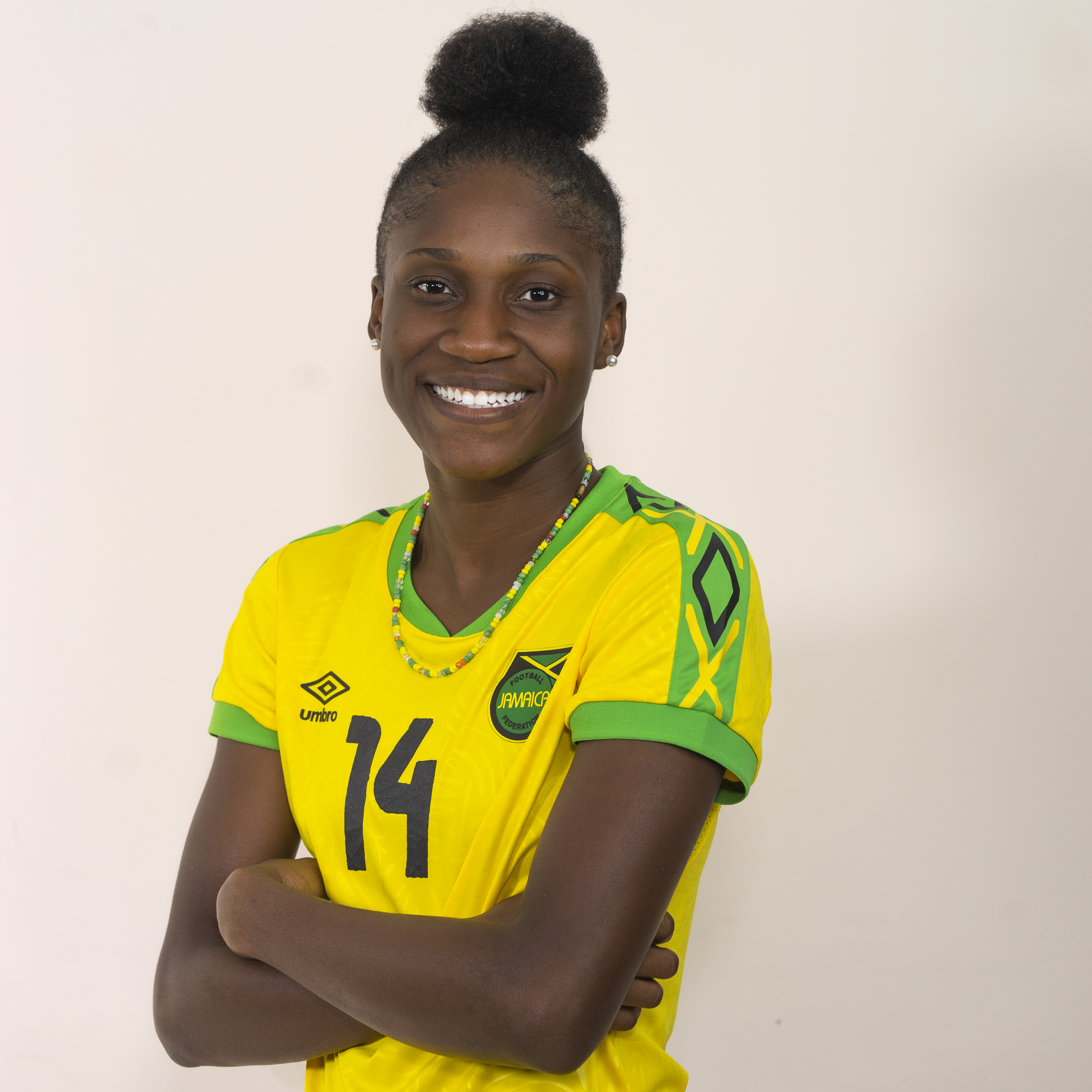

Personal information
- Full name: Deneisha Selena Blackwood
- Date of birth: 7 March 1997 (age 29)
- Place of birth: Kingston, Jamaica
- Height: 1.68 m (5 ft 6 in)
- Position: Left-back

Team information
- Current team: Toluca
- Number: 14

College career
| Years | Team | Apps | (Gls) |
| 2015–2016 | Navarro Bulldogs | 32 | (36) |
| 2017–2018 | West Florida Argonauts | 31 | (13) |

Senior career*
| Years | Team | Apps | (Gls) |
| 2018 | Florida Krush | 3 | (4) |
| 2019–2020 | Slavia Prague | 9 | (0) |
| 2020 | Orlando Pride | 0 | (0) |
| 2021 | Houston Dash | 1 | (0) |
| 2022–2023 | GPSO 92 Issy | | |
| 2023–2024 | UNAM | 37 | (11) |
| 2025 | Cruz Azul | 35 | (8) |
| 2026– | Toluca | 6 | (0) |

International career^{‡}
| 2011 | Jamaica U17 | 2 | (0) |
| 2018– | Jamaica | 48 | (11) |
Medal record
Representing Jamaica
CONCACAF W Championship
| Third place | 2018 United States |
| Third place | 2022 Mexico |
- * Club domestic league appearances and goals as of 31 January 2026 ‡ National team caps and goals as of 09:24, 19 April 2026 (UTC)

Deneisha Selena Blackwood (born 7 March 1997) is a Jamaican professional footballer who plays for Liga MX Femenil club Toluca and the Jamaica national team.

== College career ==
Predominantly a forward during her collegiate career, Blackwood played two years for NJCAA school Navarro College. She was a two-time All-American and ranked sixth in career goals with 36 at the time she left. In her sophomore season in 16, Blackwood scored 22 goals, the seventh-most in single season Navarro history. In 2017, Blackwood transferred to West Florida Argonauts and played a further two seasons. In 2017 she was named to the All-GSC second team.

== Club career ==
=== Florida Krush ===
In 2018, Blackwood played for WPSL team Florida Krush, scoring four goals in three appearances.

=== Slavia Prague ===
In 2019, Blackwood signed with Slavia Prague of the Czech First Division and was mostly played as a left back. She appeared in nine league games and a further four UEFA Champions League games as Slavia won the league title and reached the round of 16 before losing to Arsenal.

=== Orlando Pride ===
On 8 September 2020, with the 2020 NWSL season dealing with significant disruption during the COVID-19 pandemic, Blackwood was one of seven players signed to a short-term contract with Orlando Pride in order to compete in the Fall Series following the team's decision to loan out 11 senior players to play regularly overseas. She made her debut on 19 September 2020 in the first fall series match, entering as a 64th minute substitute in a 0–0 draw with North Carolina Courage. She appeared in all four Fall Series matches for a combined 196 minutes before being released at the end of her short-term contract.

=== Houston Dash ===
On 26 January 2021, Blackwood signed for Houston Dash on a one-year contract with the option of an additional year.

== International career ==
Blackwood represented Jamaica at the under-17 level in 2011.

She made her senior debut during the 2018 CONCACAF Women's Championship qualification. She was part of the Jamaica squad at the 2019 FIFA Women's World Cup in France. It was the first time a Caribbean nation had qualified for the women's tournament. She played every minute for Jamaica as the team was eliminated at the Group Stage after losing all three games against Brazil, Italy and Australia.

== Career statistics ==
=== Club ===
As of match played 17 November 2025.

Appearances and goals by club, season and competition
| Club | Season | League | | | Cup (Note: Includes the Pohár KFŽ and NWSL Challenge Cup) | | Continental (Note: Includes the UEFA Women's Champions League) | | Other | | Total | |
| Club | Season | Division | Apps | Goals | Apps | Goals | Apps | Goals | Apps | Goals | Apps | Goals |
|---|---|---|---|---|---|---|---|---|---|---|---|---|
| Florida Krush | 2018 | WPSL | 3 | 4 | — | | — | | — | | 3 | 4 |
| Slavia Prague | 2019–20 | 1. liga žen | 9 | 0 | 0 | 0 | 4 | 0 | — | | 13 | 0 |
| Orlando Pride | 2020 | NWSL | — | | — | | — | | 4 (Note: Includes the NWSL Fall Series) | 0 | 4 | 0 |
| Houston Dash | 2021 | NWSL | 1 | 0 | 0 | 0 | — | | — | | 1 | 0 |
| UNAM | 2023–24 | Liga MX Femenil | 24 | 7 | — | | — | | — | | 24 | 7 |
| UNAM | 2024–25 | Liga MX Femenil | 18 | 4 | — | | — | | — | | 18 | 4 |
| UNAM | Total | | 42 | 11 | 0 | 0 | 0 | 0 | 0 | 0 | 42 | 11 |
| Cruz Azul | 2024–25 | Liga MX Femenil | 15 | 5 | — | | — | | — | | 15 | 5 |
| Cruz Azul | 2025–26 | Liga MX Femenil | 20 | 3 | — | | — | | — | | 20 | 3 |
| Cruz Azul | Total | | 35 | 8 | 0 | 0 | 0 | 0 | 0 | 0 | 35 | 8 |
| Toluca | 2025–26 | Liga MX Femenil | 0 | 0 | — | | — | | — | | 0 | 0 |
| Career total | | | 90 | 23 | 0 | 0 | 4 | 0 | 4 | 0 | 98 | 23 |

=== International ===
As of match played 18 April 2026.

Appearances and goals by national team and year
| National team | Year | Apps | Goals |
|---|---|---|---|
| Jamaica | 2018 | 9 | 3 |
| Jamaica | 2019 | 10 | 4 |
| Jamaica | 2020 | 3 | 1 |
| Jamaica | 2021 | 2 | 0 |
| Jamaica | 2022 | 2 | 0 |
| Jamaica | 2023 | 11 | 0 |
| Jamaica | 2024 | 4 | 0 |
| Jamaica | 2025 | 4 | 2 |
| Jamaica | 2026 | 3 | 1 |
| Total | | 48 | 11 |

Scores and results list Jamaica's goal tally first, score column indicates score after each Blackwood goal.

List of international goals scored by Deneisha Blackwood
| No. | Date | Venue | Opponent | Score | Result | Competition |
|---|---|---|---|---|---|---|
| 1 | 9 May 2018 | Stade Sylvio Cator, Port-au-Prince, Haiti | Guadeloupe | 2–0 | 13–0 | 2018 CONCACAF Women's Championship qualification |
| 2 | 25 August 2018 | Independence Park, Kingston, Jamaica | Antigua and Barbuda | 4–0 | 9–0 | 2018 CONCACAF Women's Championship qualification |
| 3 | 11 October 2018 | H-E-B Park, Edinburg, United States | Cuba | 5–0 | 9–0 | 2018 CONCACAF Women's Championship |
| 4 | 30 September 2019 | Independence Park, Kingston, Jamaica | Cuba | 1–0 | 12–1 | 2020 CONCACAF Women's Olympic Qualifying Championship qualification |
| 5 | 6 October 2019 | Independence Park, Kingston, Jamaica | Saint Lucia | 4–0 | 11–0 | 2020 CONCACAF Women's Olympic Qualifying Championship qualification |
| 6 | 6 October 2019 | Independence Park, Kingston, Jamaica | Saint Lucia | 9–0 | 11–0 | 2020 CONCACAF Women's Olympic Qualifying Championship qualification |
| 7 | 6 October 2019 | Independence Park, Kingston, Jamaica | Saint Lucia | 10–0 | 11–0 | 2020 CONCACAF Women's Olympic Qualifying Championship qualification |
| 8 | 10 June 2020 | BBVA Stadium, Houston, United States | Nigeria | 1–0 | 1–0 | Friendly |
| 9 | 29 November 2025 | Daren Sammy Cricket Ground, Gros Islet, Saint Lucia | Dominica | 11–0 | 18–0 | 2026 CONCACAF W Championship qualification |
| 10 | 29 November 2025 | Daren Sammy Cricket Ground, Gros Islet, Saint Lucia | Dominica | 16–0 | 18–0 | 2026 CONCACAF W Championship qualification |
| 11 | 10 April 2026 | Independence Park, Kingston, Jamaica | Antigua and Barbuda | 4–0 | 4–0 | 2026 CONCACAF W Championship qualification |
| 12 | 9 October 2026 | Estadio Victoria, Aguascalientes, Mexico | Mexico | 3–1 | 4–3 | Friendly |

== Honours ==
=== Club ===
Slavia Prague

- Czech First Division: 2019–20
