= Ally Haran =

Canadian soccer player (born 1996)

Personal information
- Full name: Allyson Paige Haran
- Date of birth: May 21, 1996 (age 30)
- Place of birth: Stratford, Ontario, Canada
- Height: 5 ft 9 in (1.75 m)
- Position: Defender

College career
| Years | Team | Apps | (Gls) |
| 2014–2017 | Wake Forest Demon Deacons | 67 | (4) |

Senior career*
| Years | Team | Apps | (Gls) |
| 2018 | Selfoss | 17 | (2) |
| 2019 | North Carolina Courage | 0 | (0) |
| 2019 | Houston Dash | 0 | (0) |
| 2020–2021 | Orlando Pride | 2 | (0) |
| 2021–2022 | Canberra United | 14 | (0) |
- * Club domestic league appearances and goals as of January 25, 2024

Allyson Paige Haran (born May 21, 1996) is a professional soccer player who plays as a defender. Born in Canada, she has been called up to youth national team camps by both Canada and the United States.

== Early life ==
Haran was born in Stratford, Ontario, Canada. She moved to the United States at an early age and was a two-sport athlete in soccer and basketball at Powers Catholic High School in Flint, Michigan, earning first team All-Conference honors in 2011–12 and 2012–13 and an All-State honorable mention in 2012–13 for basketball. She received college scholarship offers in both sports.

=== Wake Forest Demon Deacons ===
Haran accepted a college soccer scholarship from Wake Forest University, where she played four seasons for the Demon Deacons. During her time at Wake Forest she made 66 starts in 67 appearances, captaining the team in the final two seasons and playing every game during that spell. Haran went on to become a four year letter winner.

== Club career ==
Haran was selected in the third round (25th overall) of the 2018 NWSL College Draft by Seattle Reign but was not signed by the team.

In April 2018, Haran signed a professional contract with Selfoss in the Icelandic top flight. She made 19 appearances in all competitions, scoring two goals, and was named to the 2018 Team of the Year.

In February 2019, Haran returned to the United States to sign with North Carolina Courage in the NWSL. She was waived by the Courage on July 18, 2019 having been named as an unused substitute four times.

Following her release by North Carolina, Haran was selected off waivers by Houston Dash on July 30, 2019 but did not make an appearance for the team during the 2019 season. She was named to Houston's 2020 preseason roster in March. However, preseason was canceled three days into camp amid the COVID-19 pandemic. Ahead of the eventual return to play at the 2020 NWSL Challenge Cup, Haran was waived on June 23 as part of the final roster cuts.

On September 8, 2020, with the NWSL season still dealing with significant disruption during the pandemic, Haran was one of seven players signed to a short-term contract with Orlando Pride in order to compete in the replacement Fall Series following the team's decision to loan out 11 senior players to play regularly overseas. She made her debut on September 26, 2020, as an 88th minute substitute in a 3–1 defeat to Houston Dash. She scored her first goal for the team on October 17, a 90+2 minute equalizer in a 3–3 draw with North Carolina Courage. After returning to the Pride for preseason camp, Haran signed a one-year contract with the club ahead of the 2021 season. She made two appearances during the 2021 season.

On November 1, 2021, Orlando Pride announced Haran had joined Australian A-League Women team Canberra United following the expiration of her contract. She made 14 appearances as the team finished 7th and was named both Player of the Year and Players' Player of the Year at the club's end of season awards.

== International career ==
Haran is a dual Canadian-American citizen and has previously been called up to youth national team camps by both Canada and the United States.

== Career statistics ==
=== Club ===
As of March 10, 2022.

| Club | Season | League | | | Cup (Note: Includes Icelandic Cup and NWSL Challenge Cup) | | Playoffs | | Other | | Total | |
| Club | Season | Division | Apps | Goals | Apps | Goals | Apps | Goals | Apps | Goals | Apps | Goals |
|---|---|---|---|---|---|---|---|---|---|---|---|---|
| Selfoss | 2018 | Úrvalsdeild | 17 | 2 | 2 | 0 | — | | — | | 19 | 2 |
| North Carolina Courage | 2019 | NWSL | 0 | 0 | — | | 0 | 0 | — | | 0 | 0 |
| Houston Dash | 2019 | NWSL | 0 | 0 | — | | — | | — | | 0 | 0 |
| Orlando Pride | 2020 | NWSL | — | | — | | — | | 2 (Note: Includes the NWSL Fall Series) | 1 | 2 | 1 |
| Orlando Pride | 2021 | NWSL | 2 | 0 | 0 | 0 | — | | — | | 2 | 0 |
| Orlando Pride | Total | | 2 | 0 | 0 | 0 | 0 | 0 | 2 | 1 | 4 | 1 |
| Canberra United | 2021–22 | A-League Women | 14 | 0 | — | | — | | — | | 14 | 0 |
| Career total | | | 33 | 2 | 2 | 0 | 0 | 0 | 2 | 1 | 37 | 3 |
