= Carrie Lawrence =

American soccer player (born 1997)

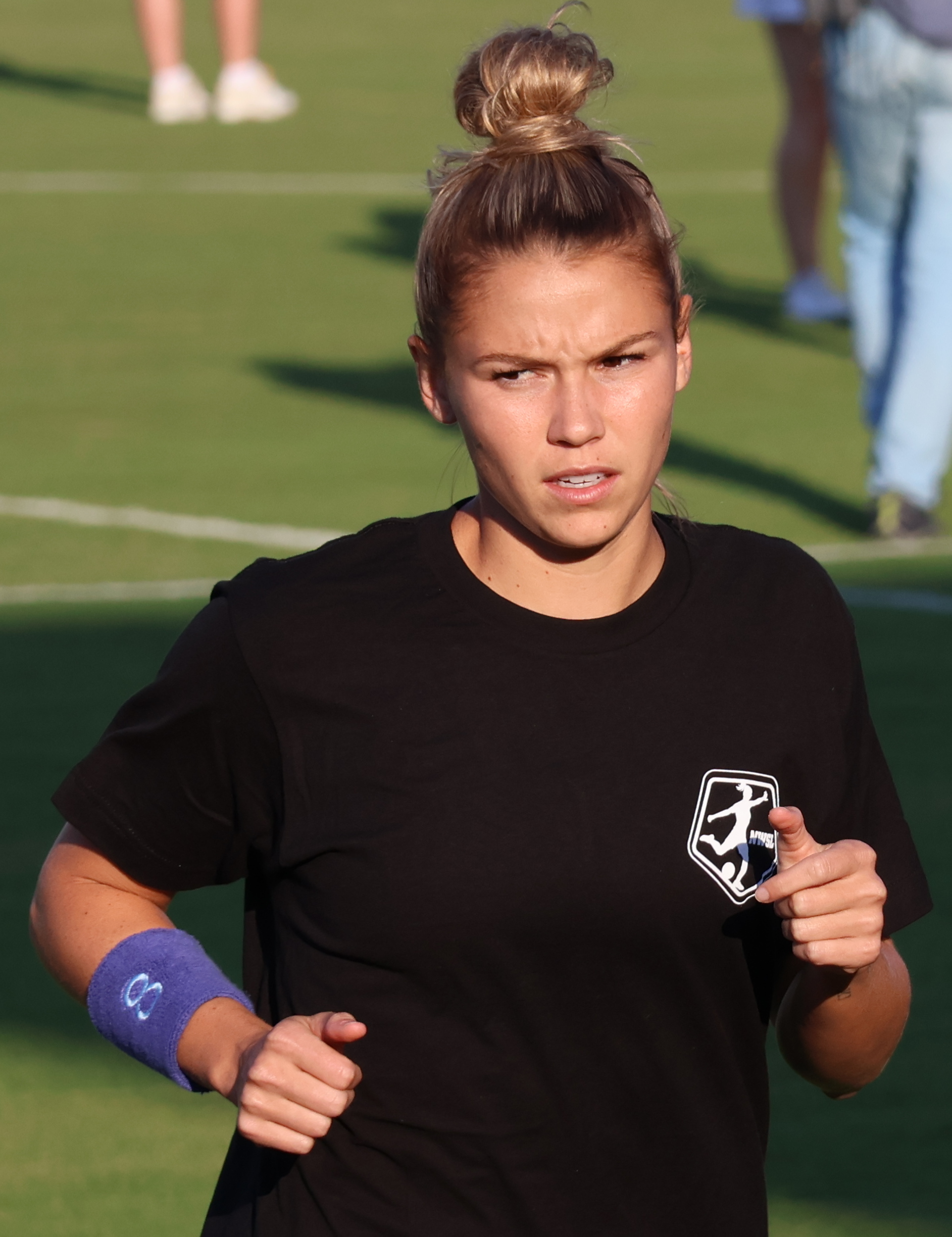
- Lawrence with the Orlando Pride in 2024

Personal information
- Full name: Carrie Elizabeth Lawrence
- Date of birth: July 15, 1997 (age 29)
- Place of birth: Orlando, Florida, United States
- Height: 5 ft 7 in (1.70 m)
- Position: Defender

Youth career
- Florida Kraze Krush

College career
Years	Team	Apps	(Gls)
2015	South Carolina Gamecocks	20	(1)
2016–2018	UCF Knights	49	(4)

Senior career*
Years	Team	Apps	(Gls)
2020–2024	Orlando Pride	20	(0)
- * Club domestic league appearances and goals as of July 6, 2024

Carrie Elizabeth Lawrence (born July 15, 1997) is an American former professional soccer defender. She spent the entirety of her professional career with the Orlando Pride of the National Women's Soccer League (NWSL), winning an NWSL Shield and NWSL Championship with the club in 2024. Lawrence previously played college soccer for the South Carolina Gamecocks and the UCF Knights.

== Early life ==
Growing up in Orlando, Florida, Lawrence was an All-Metro and All-State Player for Timber Creek High School and was named Offensive Player of the Year and Most Valuable Player while capturing Metro and District championships. She also lettered in flag football at school. Lawrence played club soccer for Florida Kraze Krush, winning state and regional championships, and was also a member of the Region III Olympic Development Program team.

=== College ===
Lawrence was recruited to play college soccer by the University of South Carolina. She spent one season with the South Carolina Gamecocks in 2015 and appeared in all 20 matches, being voted team Rookie of the Year by her teammates. Lawrence transferred to the University of Central Florida ahead of her sophomore year in 2016 and played the following three seasons with the UCF Knights. In 2018, Lawrence was a Second Team All-AAC selection and was named to the United Soccer Coaches Association All-Region Third Team.

== Professional career ==
=== Orlando Pride ===
On January 10, 2020, Lawrence was signed by Orlando Pride as a supplemental player having spent the 2019 season training full-time with the club. She was ineligible to sign in 2019 having not declared for the draft. She was waived as part of final roster ahead of the 2020 NWSL Challenge Cup.

With the 2020 NWSL season dealing with significant disruption during the COVID-19 pandemic, Lawrence rejoined the Pride, one of seven players signed to a short-term contract on September 8 in order to compete in the Fall Series following the team's decision to loan out 11 senior players to play regularly overseas. Lawrence made her NWSL debut on September 19, 2020, in the first fall series match, starting in a 0–0 draw with North Carolina Courage. She appeared in all four Fall Series matches for a combined 233 minutes. Ahead of the 2021 season, Lawrence re-signed with the club on a one-year deal with an option for an additional season.

On May 1, 2024, Lawrence assisted Barbra Banda's second goal in a 4–1 win against the North Carolina Courage. On July 6, she received two first-half yellow cards while knotted 1–1 against the Kansas City Current, which resulted in Orlando playing most of the away match with ten players. Despite that, the match ended as a 2–1 victory for Orlando on Marta's penalty. Lawrence finished the 2024 season with nine appearances (three starts) as the Pride claimed the NWSL Shield with the best record in the league. She was an unused substitute in the playoffs as the Pride completed the double with the NWSL Championship. On November 29, 2024, Lawrence announced her retirement from professional soccer.

== International career ==
In May 2015, Lawrence was called into the United States U19 training camp held at the U.S. Olympic Training Center in Chula Vista, California.

== Personal life ==
Since 2022, Lawrence has been in a relationship with her Orlando Pride teammate Marta. In August 2024, they announced their engagement. On January 2, 2026, they got married in Florida.

== Career statistics ==
=== College ===
School	Season	Division	Apps	Goals
South Carolina Gamecocks	2015	Div. I	20	1
UCF Knights	2016	Div. I	15	1
UCF Knights	2017	Div. I	16	2
UCF Knights	2018	Div. I	18	1
UCF Knights	Total		49	4
Career total			69	5

=== Club ===
As of match played October 15, 2023.

Club	Season	League			Cup (Note: NWSL Challenge Cup)		Playoffs		Other		Total	
Club	Season	Division	Apps	Goals	Apps	Goals	Apps	Goals	Apps	Goals	Apps	Goals
Orlando Pride	2020	NWSL	—		—		—		4 (Note: Includes the NWSL Fall Series)	0	4	0
Orlando Pride	2021	NWSL	0	0	0	0	—		—		0	0
Orlando Pride	2022	NWSL	14	0	4	0	—		—		18	0
Orlando Pride	2023	NWSL	0	0	0	0	—		—		0	0
Career total			14	0	4	0	0	0	4	0	22	0

== Honors ==
Orlando Pride

- NWSL Shield: 2024
- NWSL Championship: 2024
