= Konya Plummer =

Jamaican footballer (born 1997)

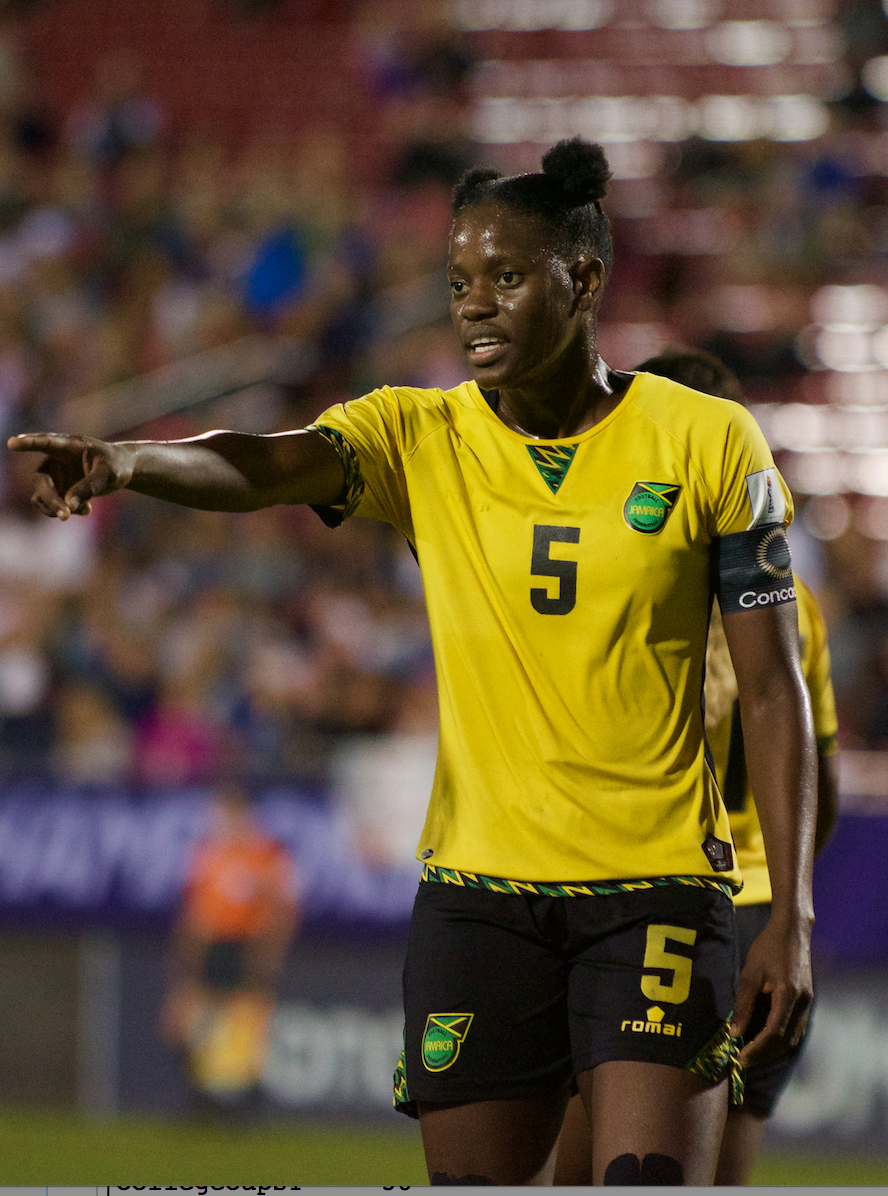

Personal information
- Full name: Konya Tajae Plummer
- Date of birth: 2 August 1997 (age 29)
- Place of birth: Epsom, Saint Mary, Jamaica
- Height: 1.76 m (5 ft 9 1/2 in)
- Position: Centre-back

Team information
- Current team: Fenerbahçe
- Number: 2

Youth career
- Rangers FC
- Titchfield High School

College career
Years	Team	Apps	(Gls)
2016–2017	Southeastern Fire	38	(19)
2018–2019	UCF Knights	26	(1)

Senior career*
Years	Team	Apps	(Gls)
2020–2021	Orlando Pride	3	(0)
2021	→ AIK (loan)	6	(0)
2023–2024	Tigres UANL	16	(2)
2024-	Fenerbahçe	38	(7)

International career^{‡}
- Jamaica U-15
- Jamaica U-17
- Jamaica U-20
2015–	Jamaica	41	(3)
Medal record
Representing Jamaica
CONCACAF W Championship
Third place	2018 United States
- * Club domestic league appearances and goals as of 8 November 2021 ‡ National team caps and goals as of 3 March 2026

Konya Tajae Plummer (born 2 August 1997) is a Jamaican professional footballer who plays as a centre-back for Turkish Women's Football Super League (KFSL) club Fenerbahçe and the Jamaica national team.

== Early life ==
Plummer's interest in football started while she was attending kindergarten, where she was exposed to the game by a relative who took her to the park in Annotto Bay to watch the sport. Plummer started playing for Rangers FC at age 11 with a boys' team in St Mary and two years later was captaining that team. Plummer then transferred to Titchfield High School in Portland with the help of vice-president of the Portland Football Association (PFA), Garfield Fuller, where she was able to participate in the Daryl Vaz-sponsored female football league. She represented the school for two years, winning the competition in both seasons. Based on her performance, she was recommended by the PFA to the national program. Plummer emigrated to the United States aged 16.

=== College ===
Plummer played four seasons of college soccer as a student athlete. Between 2016 and 2017, she played as a forward at Southeastern University where she scored 19 goals and made 16 assists in her 38 appearances for the team. As a freshman she led the team in assists with 10. On 7 October 2017, Plummer scored a career-high four goals in a match against Florida Memorial. Ahead of the 2018 season, Plummer transferred to UCF Knights, making the switch to defender in the process. In the 2019 season, Plummer was named AAC Defensive Player of the Year, having started 16 of 17 matches and only allowing seven goals, and was selected to the AAC First Team.

== Club career ==
On 16 January 2020, Plummer was selected by Orlando Pride in the second round (10th overall) of the 2020 NWSL College Draft. She became the first Jamaica-born player drafted in NWSL history. Plummer signed a two-year contract with the team on 3 March. Plummer made her professional debut on 11 October versus Houston Dash. She appeared in two Fall Series matches in total for a combined 70 minutes.

On 17 August 2021, Plummer was loaned to Swedish Damallsvenskan club AIK for the remainder of 2021 Damallsvenskan season. She made six appearances, all as a starter, helping keep three shutouts as AIK finished 10th.

On 8 December 2021, Plummer had her Orlando Pride contract option declined and was released to the waiver wire.

== International career ==
In 2018, Plummer competed in 2018 CONCACAF Women's Championship with Jamaica women's national team.

Plummer captained the Reggae Girlz at the 2019 FIFA Women's World Cup in France. It was the first time a Caribbean nation had qualified for the women's tournament. She played every minute for Jamaica as the team was eliminated at the Group Stage after losing all three games against Brazil, Italy and Australia.

== Personal life ==
Plummer has a son, born in July 2022.

== Career statistics ==
=== College ===
School	Season	Division	Apps	Goals
Southeastern Fire	2016	NAIA Div. II	17	7
Southeastern Fire	2017	NAIA Div. II	21	12
Southeastern Fire	Total		38	19
UCF Knights	2018	NCAA Div. I	10	1
UCF Knights	2019	NCAA Div. I	16	0
UCF Knights	Total		26	1
Career total			64	20

=== Club ===
As of match played 6 November 2021.

Club	Season	League			Cup		Playoffs		Other		Total	
Club	Season	Division	Apps	Goals	Apps	Goals	Apps	Goals	Apps	Goals	Apps	Goals
Orlando Pride	2020	NWSL	—		—		—		2 (Note: Includes the NWSL Fall Series)	0	2	0
Orlando Pride	2021	NWSL	3	0	2	0	—		—		5	0
Orlando Pride	Total		3	0	2	0	0	0	2	0	7	0
AIK (loan)	2021	Damallsvenskan	6	0	0	0	—		—		6	0
Career total			9	0	2	0	0	0	2	0	13	0

=== International goals ===
Scores and results list Jamaica's goal tally first

No.	Date	Venue	Opponent	Score	Result	Competition
1	9 May 2018	Stade Sylvio Cator, Port-au-Prince, Haiti	Guadeloupe (Note: CONCACAF member association that is not recognised by FIFA.)	3–0	13–0	2018 CONCACAF Women's Championship qualification
2	27 August 2018	National Stadium, Kingston, Jamaica	Bermuda	2–0	4–0	2018 CONCACAF Women's Championship qualification
3	29 November 2025	Daren Sammy Cricket Ground, Gros Islet, Saint Lucia	Dominica	1–0	18–0	2026 CONCACAF W Championship qualification

== Honours ==
Fenerbahçe

- Turkish Super League: 2025–26
