= Brittany Isenhour =

American professional soccer player

Personal information
- Full name: Brittany Isenhour
- Birth name: Brittany Wilson
- Date of birth: September 22, 1997 (age 29)
- Place of birth: Littleton, Colorado, U.S.
- Height: 5 ft 8 in (1.73 m)
- Position: Goalkeeper

Youth career
- 2012–2016: Real Colorado Foxes

College career
Years	Team	Apps	(Gls)
2016–2019	Denver Pioneers	80	(0)

Senior career*
Years	Team	Apps	(Gls)
2019	Colorado Rapids	8	(0)
2020–2021	Orlando Pride	1	(0)
2022–2023	Angel City	0	(0)

International career
2015	United States U19		
2015–2016	United States U20		
- * Club domestic league appearances and goals as of December 17, 2021

Brittany Isenhour (née Wilson; born September 22, 1997) is a retired American professional soccer player who played as a goalkeeper.

== Early life ==
Isenhour grew up in Littleton, Colorado and started playing club soccer at the age of 12 with Real Colorado Foxes ENCL, helping the club reach the National Final in 2013 and 2014. Isenhour also played three years in the Colorado Olympic Development Program. Her parents are divorced.

=== Denver Pioneers ===
Isenhour played college soccer at the University of Denver between 2016 and 2019. In total, Isenhour played 80 career matches for Denver Pioneers, posting 25 career shutouts, the fourth most in program history. Isenhour won two Summit League Tournament titles in 2017 and 2018 as well as being recognized individually as Summit League Goalkeeper of the Year as a freshman in 2016. She was named to the Summit League Second Team in the other three seasons.

== Club career ==
=== Colorado Rapids ===
In 2019, Isenhour made 8 appearances for Colorado Rapids in the WPSL.

=== Orlando Pride ===
Isenhour declared for the 2020 NWSL College Draft but was not selected. Originally trialing with Orlando Pride during preseason prior to the schedule disruption caused by the COVID-19 pandemic, she eventually signed a short-term contract with Orlando ahead of the 2020 NWSL Challenge Cup in July before the team was forced to withdraw. In September, Isenhour was signed through the 2021 season and made her debut on October 9 during the Fall Series, playing the full 90 minutes in a 2–1 defeat to Houston Dash. She made a total of five saves on her debut including one on Sophie Schmidt which was voted NWSL Save of the Week.

=== Angel City FC ===
On December 17, 2021, Isenhour was traded along with a third-round pick in the 2023 NWSL Draft to new expansion franchise Angel City FC in exchange for a fourth-round pick in the 2023 NWSL Draft and an agreement regarding partial 2022 NWSL Expansion Draft protection. The previous day, Angel City had left the Pride roster alone during the expansion draft, only claiming the playing rights of Claire Emslie from Orlando. On January 4, 2024, Angel City announced Isenhour would not return to the club for the 2024 season.

=== Retirement ===
Isenhour was a non-roster invitee to 2024 training camp for Kansas City Current. On January 31, 2024, Isenhour announced her retirement from professional soccer.

== International ==
Isenhour has previously been called up to the United States national team at under-19 and under-20 level.

== Personal life ==
She married Trystan Isenhour in December 2021.

== Career statistics ==
=== Club ===
As of January 5, 2024.

Club	Season	League			Playoffs		Cup .,		Other		Total	
Club	Season	Division	Apps	Goals	Apps	Goals	Apps	Goals	Apps	Goals	Apps	Goals
Colorado Rapids	2019	WPSL	8	0	—		—		—		8	0
Orlando Pride	2020	NWSL	—		—		—		1 (Note: Includes the NWSL Fall Series)	0	1	0
Orlando Pride	2021	NWSL	0	0	—		0	0	—		0	0
Orlando Pride	Total		0	0	0	0	0	0	1	0	1	0
Angel City FC	2022	NWSL	0	0	—		0	0	—		0	0
Angel City FC	2023	NWSL	0	0	—		4 (Note: NWSL Challenge Cup)	0	—		4	0
Career total			8	0	0	0	4	0	1	0	13	0

== Honors ==
College

- Summit League: 2017, 2018

Individual

- Summit League Goalkeeper of the Year: 2016
