= 2021 Houston Dash season =

Houston Dash
2021 season
- Head coach: James Clarkson
- Stadium: PNC Stadium (rebranded from BBVA Stadium in June)
- NWSL: 7th
- NWSL Playoffs: DNQ
- Challenge Cup: 3rd, West
- Copa Tejas Shield: 6th
- Top goalscorer: League: Rachel Daly (9); All: Rachel Daly (10)
- Highest home attendance: 4,792 vs. POR (17 October 2021)
- Lowest home attendance: 1,929 vs. POR (24 July 2021)
- Average home league attendance: 3,386
- Biggest win: 4-0 vs. LOU (26 September 2021)
- Biggest defeat: 5-1 vs. RGN (7 August 2021)
Home colors	Away colors

The 2021 Houston Dash season was the team's eighth season as an American professional women's soccer team in the National Women's Soccer League (NWSL).

The 2021 NWSL season returned as a full league season after COVID-19 caused the 2020 NWSL season to be limited to the 2020 NWSL Challenge Cup and Fall Series. The NWSL continued to showcase the Challenge Cup in 2021, prior to a full league season starting in late April.

== Background ==
The Dash retained their 2020 NWSL Challenge Cup-winning coach and general manager, James Clarkson, and much of their roster from the previous season.

In June 2021, real-estate developer Ted Segal reportedly paid $400 million to purchase majority ownership of the Houston Dynamo and Dash, and the leasing rights to BBVA Stadium, from Gabriel Brener, who retained a minority stake.

Six of the Dash's regular starters participated in the 2020 Tokyo Olympics, held in July and August. Three Canadian national team members of the Dash returned from the competition as gold medalists: Allysha Chapman, Nichelle Prince, and Sophie Schmidt.

During the 2021 season, current and former players across the league leveled numerous allegations of abuse and misconduct among several teams' coaches and managers. The resulting investigations led to several coaches and managers being fired or asked to resign. Along with other coaching turnover during the 2021 season, Clarkson was the only male coach who started the season to retain his job at the end of it, though he would be suspended at the start of the 2022 Houston Dash season pending an investigation into allegations of misconduct.

== Stadium ==
The Dash continued to play in BBVA Stadium in 2022. In June 2021, the stadium was rebranded as PNC Stadium following PNC Financial Services' acquisition of BBVA USA.

== Player and staff ==
=== Roster ===
As of November 5, 2021.

No.	Name	Nationality	Position(s)	Date of birth (age)	Signed in	Previous club	Apps	Goals
Goalkeepers
1	Jane Campbell	(United States)	GK	February 17, 1995 (age 31)	2017	(United States) Stanford Cardinals	18	0
20	Lindsey Harris	(United States)	GK	November 19, 1993 (age 32)	2020	(Norway) Klepp	5	0
33	Amanda Dennis	(United States)	GK	May 25, 1998 (age 28)	2020	(United States) Penn State Nittany Lions	1	0
Defenders
2	Allysha Chapman	(Canada)	DF	January 25, 1989 (age 37)	2018	(United States) North Carolina Courage	16	0
11	Megan Oyster	(United States)	DF	September 3, 1992 (age 33)	2020	(United States) Reign FC	21	0
21	Deneisha Blackwood	(Jamaica)	DF	March 7, 1997 (age 29)	2021	(United States) Orlando Pride	1	0
23	Abby Dahlkemper	(United States)	DF	May 4, 1993 (age 33)	2021	(United States) North Carolina Courage	8	0
25	Katie Naughton	(United States)	DF	February 15, 1994 (age 32)	2020	(Australia) Perth Glory	24	3
27	Annika Schmidt	(United States)	DF	May 4, 1993 (age 33)	2021	(Sweden) Kopparbergs/Göteborg FC	0	0
Midfielders
5	Gabby Seiler	(United States)	MF	September 14, 1994 (age 31)	2021	(United States) Portland Thorns FC	24	2
6	Shea Groom	(United States)	MF	May 4, 1993 (age 33)	2020	(United States) Reign FC	24	3
9	Haley Hanson	(United States)	MF	February 22, 1996 (age 30)	2018	(United States) Nebraska Cornhuskers	?	?
10	Christine Nairn	(United States)	MF	September 25, 1990 (age 35)	2019	(United States) Orlando Pride	5	0
13	Sophie Schmidt	(Canada)	MF	June 28, 1998 (age 27)	2019	(Germany) FFC Frankfurt	18	0
14	Brianna Visalli	(United States)	MF	April 17, 1995 (age 31)	2020	(England) Birmingham City	16	2
18	Emily Ogle	(United States)	MF	August 5, 1996 (age 29)	2021	(United States) Portland Thorns FC	8	0
19	Kristie Mewis	(United States)	MF	February 25, 1991 (age 35)	2017	(United States) Chicago Red Stars	16	3
29	Andrea Hauksdóttir	(Iceland)	MF	January 28, 1996 (age 30)	2021	(Iceland) Breiðablik	1	0
33	Makamae Gomera-Stevens	(United States)	MF	March 17, 1999 (age 27)	2021	(United States) Washington State Cougars	13	0
36	Amber Marshall	(United States)	MF	January 24, 1999 (age 27)	2021	(United States) Utah Royals FC Reserves	0	0
Forwards
3	Rachel Daly	(England)	FW	December 4, 1991 (age 34)	2016	(United States) SoCal FC	15	9
4	Maegan Rosa	(Canada)	FW	February 19, 1992 (age 34)	2020	(Italy) Florentina	4	0
8	Nichelle Prince	(Canada)	FW	February 15, 1995 (age 31)	2017	(United States) Ohio State Buckeyes	16	2
12	Veronica Latsko	(United States)	FW	December 12, 1995 (age 30)	2018	(United States) Virginia Cavaliers	22	3
16	Hannah Diaz	(United States)	FW	February 17, 1996 (age 30)	2021	(France) FC Fleury 91	2	0
22	Jasmyne Spencer	(United States)	FW	August 27, 1990 (age 35)	2021	(United States) OL Reign	18	1
24	Jamia Fields	(United States)	FW	September 24, 1993 (age 32)	2019	(Norway) Avaldsnes IL	8	0
34	Michaela Abam	(Cameroon)	FW	June 12, 1997 (age 28)	2021	(Spain) Real Betis	7	1
35	Michelle Alozie	(Nigeria)	FW	April 28, 1997 (age 29)	2021	(United States) Tennessee Lady Volunteers	4	0

=== Staff ===
As of June 22, 2021.

Executive
Majority owner	Ted Segal
Minority owners	Gabriel Brener; Oscar De La Hoya; Ben Guill; James Harden
President of business operations	John Walker
Coaching Staff
Head coach General manager	(England) James Clarkson
Assistant coach	(United States) Twila Kaufman
Goalkeeping coach	(United States) Brenton Saylor

== Competitions ==
=== NWSL Challenge Cup ===
The Dash returned to defend their title after winning the 2020 NWSL Challenge Cup. However, the Dash struggled to win matches and failed to advance from the group stage, claiming victory once and drawing three times to finish third behind OL Reign and eventual champions Portland Thorns FC in the West Division.

April 9, 2021	Houston Dash	0–0	Chicago Red Stars	Houston, TX
7:30 p.m. CDT		Report	Wright (yellow card) 26'	Stadium: PNC Stadium; Attendance: 4,204; Referee: Tori Penso

April 16, 2021	OL Reign	0–0	Houston Dash	Tacoma, WA
7:00 p.m. PDT	Groom (yellow card) 25'	Report	Weatherholt (yellow card) 23'	Stadium: Cheney Stadium; Attendance: 1,263; Referee: Katja Koroleva

April 26, 2021	Kansas City NWSL	1-3	Houston Dash	Kansas City, KS
7:30 p.m. CDT	Miramontez (yellow card) 29'; Corsie (yellow card) 40'; Del Fava (yellow card) 54'; Vasconcelos 78'	Report	Mewis 24', 71'; Campbell (yellow card) 34'; Daly 45+1'; Visalli (yellow card) 58'	Stadium: Children's Mercy Park; Attendance: 4,669; Referee: Alyssa Nichols

May 2, 2021	Houston Dash	1–1	Portland Thorns FC	Houston, TX
6:30 p.m. CDT	Groom 45+2' (yellow card) 57'; Chapman (yellow card) 90+3'	Report	Sinclair 77'	Stadium: PNC Stadium; Attendance: 3,162; Referee: Elvis Osmanovic

==== Divisional standings ====
Pos	Team	Pld	W	D	L	GF	GA	GD	Pts	Qualification
1	Portland Thorns FC	4	3	1	0	6	2	+4	10	Qualification for the Championship
2	OL Reign	4	2	1	1	5	5	0	7	
3	Houston Dash	4	1	3	0	4	2	+2	6	
4	Chicago Red Stars	4	0	2	2	3	5	−2	2	
5	Kansas City	4	0	1	3	4	8	−4	1	

Source: NWSL
Rules for classification: Tiebreakers

=== National Women's Soccer League season ===
The Dash rose as high as third in the NWSL table during the season, and with three matches remaining required only one point to clinch a first-ever league playoffs berth. However, the Dash lost all three matches, going scoreless in each, and missed the playoffs for the eighth consecutive season.

==== Results ====
May 15, 2021 1	NJ/NY Gotham FC	1–0	Houston Dash	Harrison, NJ
7:00 p.m. EDT	Cudjoe (yellow card) 8'; Purce 30'; Monaghan (yellow card) 73'	Report	Hanson (yellow card) 66'; Prince (yellow card) 68'; Daly (yellow card) 81'; Schmidt (yellow card) 90+1'	Stadium: Red Bull Arena; Attendance: 1,924

May 23, 2021 2	Houston Dash	2–2	Kansas City Current	Houston, TX
6:00 p.m. CDT	Schmidt (yellow card) 57'; Daly 60'; Groom 66'	Report	Rodriguez 13'; Ball (yellow card) 53' (yellow-red card) 69'; Listro (yellow card) 87'; Leach (yellow card) 61' (goal) 90+2'	Stadium: BBVA Stadium; Attendance: 3,034

May 26, 2021 3	Washington Spirit	2–1	Houston Dash	Houston, TX
8:30 p.m. EDT	Sanchez 21'; Sullivan (yellow card) 44' (yellow-red card) 50'; Hatch 70' (yellow card) 80'	Report	Daly 9'; Hanson (yellow card) 45'; Groom (yellow card) 75'; Prince (yellow card) 90+5'	Stadium: BBVA Stadium; Attendance: 2,241
Note: Match was relocated from Segra Field in Leesburg, VA, after NWSL officials deemed the stadium to be noncompliant with league requirements. For competition purposes, the Spirit were considered the home team for this match played in the Dash's home venue.

May 29, 2021 4	Houston Dash	2–1	Chicago Red Stars	Houston, TX
6:30 p.m. CDT	Prince 18' (yellow card) 69'; Mewis 83'	Report	Pugh 4'; Gautrat (yellow card) 59'	Stadium: BBVA Stadium; Attendance: 3,136

June 6, 2021 5	Kansas City NWSL	0–1	Houston Dash	Kansas City, KS
1:00 p.m. CDT	Smith (yellow card) 27'	Report	Prisock (yellow card) 18'; Groom (yellow card) 27'; Seiler (yellow card) 40'; Mewis (yellow card) 52'; Naughton 79'; Montefusco (yellow card) 89'	Stadium: Legends Field; Attendance: 4,265

June 20, 2021 6	Racing Louisville FC	1–0	Houston Dash	Louisville, KY
3:00 p.m. EDT	Bonner (yellow card) 10'; Salmon 72'	Report	Latsko (yellow card) 7'	Stadium: Lynn Family Stadium; Attendance: 5,971

June 26, 2021 7	Houston Dash	2–1	Orlando Pride	Houston, TX
7:00 p.m. CDT	Sanchez 18'; Latsko 26'; Hanson (yellow card) 90+5'	Report	Jónsdóttir 49'; Daugherty Howard (yellow card) 56'; Marta (yellow card) 90'	Stadium: PNC Stadium; Attendance: 4,693

July 2, 2021 8	Houston Dash	2–0	OL Reign	Houston, TX
7:30 p.m. CDT	Prisock (yellow card) 44'; Gomera-Stevens (yellow card) 45+2'; Spencer 50'; Naughton 57'; Alozie (yellow card) 90'	Report	Celia (yellow card) 17'	Stadium: PNC Stadium; Attendance: 4,337

July 11, 2021 9	Chicago Red Stars	2–1	Houston Dash	Bridgeview, IL
	Groom 73' (o.g.); Naughton 76' (o.g.)	Report	Latsko 62'; Hanson (yellow card) 88'	Stadium: SeatGeek Stadium; Attendance: 2,520

July 17, 2021 10	North Carolina Courage	1–2	Houston Dash	Cary, NC
7:00 p.m. EDT	Hamilton 16'; Mathias (yellow card) 57'; O'Sullivan (yellow card) 61'	Report	Groom 9' (yellow card) 29'; Seiler 62' (yellow card) 69'; Visalli (yellow card) 90+5'	Stadium: WakeMed Soccer Park; Attendance: 5,229

July 24, 2021 11	Houston Dash	0–1	Portland Thorns FC	Houston, TX
	Ogle (yellow card) 64'	Report	Smith 1'; Salem (yellow card) 54'; Hubly (yellow card) 62'	Stadium: PNC Stadium; Attendance: 1,929

August 1, 2021 12	Houston Dash	1–1	NJ/NY Gotham FC	Houston, TX
6:00 p.m. CDT	Seiler 51'; Groom (yellow card) 90+6'	Report	Onumonu (yellow card) 27' (goal) 89'	Stadium: PNC Stadium; Attendance: 3,517

August 7, 2021 13	OL Reign	5–1	Houston Dash	Tacoma, WA
7:00 p.m. PDT	Balcer 6', 45+1'; Huerta 19'; Le Sommer 35'; Fishlock 42'	Report	Cook 30' (o.g.); Fields (yellow card) 49'; Alozie 84'	Stadium: Cheney Stadium; Attendance: 2,922

August 13, 2021 14	Houston Dash	2–2	Washington Spirit	Houston, TX
8:30 p.m. EDT	Latsko 61' (yellow card) 90+4'; Fields (yellow card) 67'; Abam 83'	Report	Nielsen 8'; Huster (yellow card) 5' (goal) 53'	Stadium: PNC Stadium; Attendance: 3,167

August 29, 2021 15	Houston Dash	1–0	Racing Louisville FC	Houston, TX
	Daly 49'; Naughton (yellow card) 73'; Visalli (yellow card) 90+7'; Hanson (yellow card) 90+8'	Report	Baucom (yellow card) 68'; Simon (yellow card) 82'	Stadium: PNC Stadium; Attendance: 3,292

September 1, 2021 16	Houston Dash	0–1	OL Reign	Houston, TX
	Montefusco (yellow card) 46'; Spencer (yellow card) 54'; Daly (yellow card) 68'	Report	Balcer 7'; King (yellow card) 86'	Stadium: PNC Stadium; Attendance: 2,569

September 5, 2021 17	Orlando Pride	1–1	Houston Dash	Orlando, FL
	Howard (yellow card) 70'; Kornieck 79'	Report	Daly 10' (yellow card) 53'; Seiler (yellow card) 68'	Stadium: Exploria Stadium; Attendance: 4,451

September 10, 2021 18	Houston Dash	1–1	Chicago Red Stars	Houston, TX
7:30 p.m. CDT	Daly 22'; Chapman (yellow card) 76'	Report	Krueger (yellow card) 64' (goal) 77'	Stadium: PNC Stadium; Attendance: 3,155

September 26, 2021 19	Racing Louisville FC	0–4	Houston Dash	Louisville, KY
3:00 p.m. EDT	Matthews (yellow card) 16'	Report	Visalli 34'; Mewis 43'; Naughton 72'; Prince 83'	Stadium: Lynn Family Stadium; Attendance: 6,374

October 6, 2021 20	Portland Thorns FC	2–3	Houston Dash	Portland, OR
7:00 p.m. PDT	Sauerbrunn (yellow card) 17'; Sinclair 30'; Horan (yellow card) 56'; Smith 57'	Report	Daly 18', 79'; Mewis 23'	Stadium: Providence Park; Attendance: 11,139

October 10, 2021 21	Houston Dash	4–1	North Carolina Courage	Houston, TX
6:00 p.m. CDT	Visalli 6'; Montefusco (yellow card) 19'; Daly 24', 57'; Groom 26'	Report	McDonald 4'; Erceg (yellow card) 66'	Stadium: PNC Stadium; Attendance: 4,155

October 13, 2021 22	Kansas City NWSL	3–0	Houston Dash	Kansas City, KS
7:00 p.m. CDT	Jenkins 18'; Ball 36'; Pickett (yellow card) 87'; LaBonta 90+2'	Report	Spencer (yellow card) 90+4'	Stadium: Legends Field; Attendance: 3,449

October 17, 2021 23	Houston Dash	0–1	Portland Thorns FC	Houston, TX
6:00 p.m. CDT	Chapman (yellow card) 52'	Report	Horan 43'; Rodriguez (yellow card) 60'	Stadium: PNC Stadium; Attendance: 4,792

October 31, 2021 24	Washington Spirit	1–0	Houston Dash	Washington, D.C.
	Rodman 76'	Report	Naughton (yellow card) 63'; Groom (yellow card) 72'	Stadium: Audi Field; Attendance: 4,542

==== Standings ====
Pos	Team	Pld	W	D	L	GF	GA	GD	Pts	Qualification
1	Portland Thorns FC	24	13	5	6	33	17	+16	44	NWSL Shield
2	OL Reign	24	13	3	8	37	24	+13	42	Playoffs – Semi-finals
3	Washington Spirit (C)	24	11	6	7	29	26	+3	39	Playoffs – First round
4	Chicago Red Stars	24	11	5	8	28	28	0	38	Playoffs – First round
5	NJ/NY Gotham FC	24	8	11	5	29	21	+8	35	Playoffs – First round
6	North Carolina Courage	24	9	6	9	28	23	+5	33	Playoffs – First round
7	Houston Dash	24	9	5	10	31	31	0	32	
8	Orlando Pride	24	7	7	10	27	32	−5	28	
9	Racing Louisville FC	24	5	7	12	21	40	−19	22	
10	Kansas City	24	3	7	14	15	36	−21	16	

Source: NWSL
Rules for classification: Tiebreakers
(C) Champions

=== International Champions Cup ===
By virtue of being the 2020 NWSL Challenge Cup champions, the Women's International Champions Cup invited the Dash to the 2021 friendly exhibition tournament, staged on 18–21 August 2021 in Portland, Oregon. The Dash were joined by 2020 NWSL Fall Series winners Portland Thorns FC, 2019-20 UEFA Women's Champions League and 2019–20 Division 1 Féminine winners Olympique Lyon, and 2019–20 Primera División Femenina winners FC Barcelona Femení. The Dash drew against the Thorns in regulation of the semi-final match, but lost in a penalty shootout. The Dash also fell in the third-place match against FC Barcelona, despite rallying to a 2–1 lead in the second half.

==== Results ====
August 18, 2021 Semi-final	Portland Thorns FC (United States)	2–2 (3–1 p)	(United States) Houston Dash	Portland, OR
20:06 PDT	Kuikka 51'; Moultrie 58'	Report	Groom 17', 41'	Stadium: Providence Park; Referee: Adorae Monroy
	Penalties
	Klingenberg (penalty scored); Kuikka (penalty missed); Moultrie (penalty scored); Charley (penalty scored)		(penalty missed) Nairn; (penalty missed) Schmidt; (penalty scored) Daly; (penalty missed) Abam

August 21, 2021 Third place play-off	Barcelona (Spain)	3–2	(United States) Houston Dash	Portland, OR
16:36 PDT	Crnogorčević 34'; Putellas 72' (pen.), 78'	Report	Fernández 48' (o.g.); Groom 62'	Stadium: Providence Park; Referee: Samantha Martinez

==== Bracket ====
Semi-finals
August 18 – Portland
(France) Lyon	3
(Spain) Barcelona	2
August 18 – Portland
(United States) Portland Thorns FC (p)	2 (3)
(United States) Houston Dash	2 (1)

Final
August 21 – Portland
(France) Lyon	0
(United States) Portland Thorns FC	1
Third place play-off
August 21 – Portland
(Spain) Barcelona	3
(United States) Houston Dash	2

== See also ==
- 2021 National Women's Soccer League season
- 2021 in American soccer
