= Marisa DiGrande =

American soccer player (born 1997)

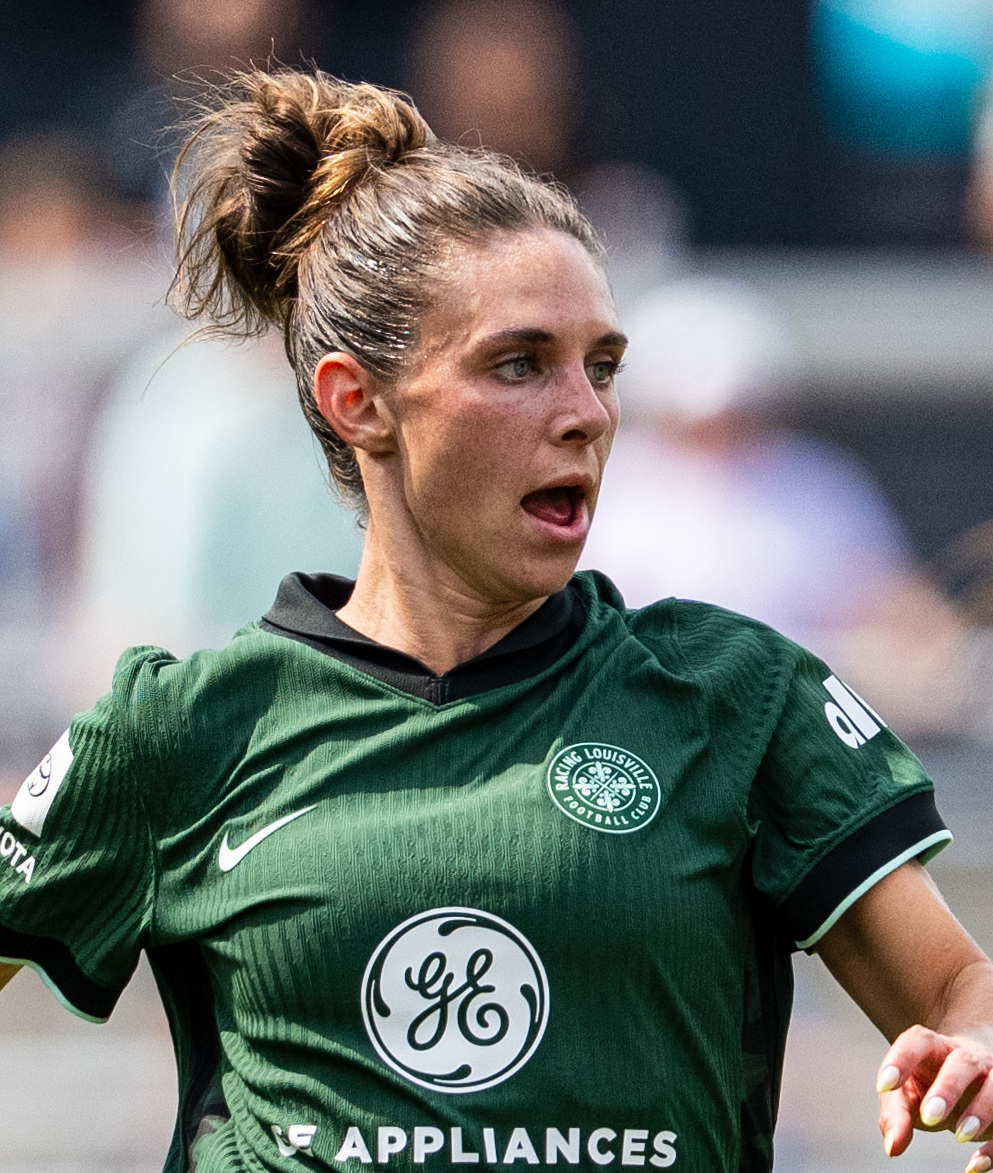
- DiGrande with Racing Louisville in 2025

Personal information
- Birth name: Marisa Marie Viggiano
- Date of birth: February 5, 1997 (age 29)
- Place of birth: Troy, Michigan, U.S.
- Height: 5 ft 4 in (1.63 m)
- Position: Midfielder

Team information
- Current team: Racing Louisville
- Number: 14

Youth career
- Michigan Hawks ECNL

College career
Years	Team	Apps	(Gls)
2015–2018	Northwestern Wildcats	85	(5)

Senior career*
Years	Team	Apps	(Gls)
2018	Motor City FC		
2019–2021	Orlando Pride	40	(2)
2022–2023	Houston Dash	40	(2)
2024–	Racing Louisville	46	(2)

International career^{‡}
2019	United States U23		
- * Club domestic league appearances and goals as of November 8, 2025 ‡ National team caps and goals as of August 21, 2019

Marisa Marie DiGrande (née Viggiano; born February 5, 1997) is an American professional soccer player who plays as a midfielder for Racing Louisville FC of the National Women's Soccer League (NWSL).

== Early life ==
Coming out of high school, DiGrande ranked as the No. 25 recruit in the nation and the No. 5 recruit in the Great Lakes Region by TopDrawerSoccer.com. She played three seasons of club soccer for Michigan Hawks ECNL.

=== Northwestern Wildcats ===
DiGrande attended Northwestern University from 2015 to 2018 where she got a degree in communication studies. She was named to the Big Ten All-Freshman Team after starting every game, a streak that continued through 83 games into her senior year, the third-longest streak in program history. She also ranks second all-time in program assists with 20.

In the off-seasons, DiGrande played with hometown Women's Premier Soccer League side Motor City FC.

== Club career ==
=== Orlando Pride ===
DiGrande was selected in the fourth round (30th overall) of the 2019 NWSL College Draft by Orlando Pride. Following preseason, she was officially signed to the team's senior roster on April 10. She made her professional debut on April 27, coming on as a substitute for Dani Weatherholt against Utah Royals FC. DiGrande scored her first professional goal on July 20, 2019, the game-winner in a 1–0 win over Sky Blue FC. It was nominated for Goal of the Week.

With the 2020 season disrupted by the COVID-19 pandemic, Orlando's scheduled was limited to four games in total as part of the Fall Series. DiGrande finished as the team's top scorer with two goals in four appearances. Ahead of the 2021 season she signed a new two-year contract with the option for an additional year.

=== Houston Dash ===
On January 28, 2022, Houston Dash acquired DiGrande in a trade with Orlando in exchange for Megan Oyster, $30,000 in allocation money and a third-round pick in the 2023 NWSL Draft.

=== Racing Louisville FC ===
DiGrande signed with Racing Louisville FC in December 2023.

== International career ==
DiGrande has previously been called into camp with the United States U16 and U20 youth national teams. In August 2019, DiGrande was selected as part of the U23 squad to contest the Nordic Tournament against Norway, England and Sweden.

== Personal life ==
DiGrande's younger sister, Natalie Viggiano, is also a soccer player currently at the OL Reign. Her father, Tom Viggiano, played and coached ice hockey at Kent State University and was inducted into the KSU Athletic Hall of Fame in 2013.

Formerly Marisa Viggiano, she married Danny DiGrande in January 2024.

== Career statistics ==
=== Club ===
As of match played October 15, 2023.

Club	Season	League			Cup (Note: NWSL Challenge Cup)		Playoffs		Other		Total	
Club	Season	Division	Apps	Goals	Apps	Goals	Apps	Goals	Apps	Goals	Apps	Goals
Orlando Pride	2019	NWSL	19	1	—		—		—		19	1
Orlando Pride	2020	NWSL	—		—		—		4 (Note: Includes the NWSL Fall Series)	2	4	2
Orlando Pride	2021	NWSL	21	1	4	0	—		—		25	1
Orlando Pride	Total		40	2	4	0	0	0	4	2	48	4
Houston Dash	2022	NWSL	20	2	6	1	1	0	—		27	3
Houston Dash	2023	NWSL	20	0	5	0	—		—		25	0
Career total			80	4	15	1	1	0	4	2	100	7
