= 2020 NWSL College Draft =

Soccer draft

General information
- Sport: Soccer
- Date: January 16, 2020
- Time: 11:00 AM ET
- Location: Baltimore Convention Center, Baltimore, Maryland

Overview
- 36 total selections in 4 rounds
- League: National Women's Soccer League
- First selection: Sophia Smith, Portland Thorns FC
- Most selections: Orlando Pride (7 picks)
- Fewest selections: Houston Dash (2 picks)

The 2020 NWSL College Draft was the eighth annual meeting of National Women's Soccer League (NWSL) franchises to select newly eligible college players for the 2020 NWSL season. It was held on January 16, 2020, in conjunction with the United Soccer Coaches Convention at the Baltimore Convention Center in Baltimore, Maryland.

== Format ==
- NWSL teams took turns making their selections over four rounds, with nine picks per round. Draft order was determined by the final 2019 regular season standings.
- The draft was broadcast live via the NWSL website, Facebook and YouTube.
- Final list of registered players was released on January 15, 2020.
- The 2020 draft was the first since the introduction of allocation money, and the league's first transactions exchanging allocation money involved picks in this draft.

== Results ==
As of November 20, 2025.

=== Key ===
| ^{+} | Denotes player who has been selected as NWSL Most Valuable Player |
| ^{*} | Denotes player who has been selected for an NWSL Best XI or NWSL Second XI team |
| ^{^} | Denotes player who has been selected as NWSL Rookie of the Year |
| ^{#} | Denotes player who has never appeared in a competitive NWSL game (regular season, playoff, Challenge Cup, or 2020 Fall Series) |

=== Picks ===
| Round | Pick | Nat. | Player | Pos. | NWSL team | Notes | College |
|---|---|---|---|---|---|---|---|
| Round 1 | 1 | (United States) | Sophia Smith ^{+*} | F | Portland Thorns FC | (Note: Orlando Pride → Portland Thorns FC. Portland Thorns FC received Orlando Pride's No. 1 overall pick in the 2020 NWSL College Draft in exchange for the No. 7 and No. 14 picks in the 2020 NWSL College Draft, Emily Sonnett and the rights to Caitlin Foord.) | Stanford |
| Round 1 | 2 | (United States) | Morgan Weaver | F | Portland Thorns FC | (Note: Sky Blue FC → Chicago Red Stars → Portland Thorns FC. Portland Thorns FC acquired the No. 2 pick in the 2020 NWSL College Draft from Chicago Red Stars in exchange for the No. 15 and No. 16 picks in the 2020 NWSL College Draft and $70,000 of allocation money. Chicago Red Stars acquired the No. 2 and No. 3 picks in the 2020 NWSL College Draft from Sky Blue FC in exchange for the No. 4 and No. 5 picks in the 2020 NWSL College Draft and $80,000 of allocation money.) | Washington State |
| Round 1 | 3 | (United States) | Taylor Kornieck * | M | Orlando Pride | (Note: Houston Dash → Chicago Red Stars → Sky Blue FC → Chicago Red Stars → Orlando Pride. Orlando Pride acquired the No. 3 and No. 26 picks in the 2020 NWSL College draft in exchange for the No. 19 pick in the 2020 NWSL College Draft, Orlando's natural first-round selection in the 2021 NWSL College Draft, Rachel Hill and $50,000 of allocation money. Chicago Red Stars acquired the No. 2 and No. 3 picks in the 2020 NWSL College Draft from Sky Blue FC in exchange for the No. 4 and No. 5 picks in the 2020 NWSL College Draft and $80,000 of allocation money. Sky Blue FC received Chicago Red Stars' highest first-round pick and a second-round pick in the 2020 NWSL College Draft in exchange for Savannah McCaskill. Chicago Red Stars' highest first-round pick was acquired from Houston Dash along with Christen Press in exchange for Sofia Huerta and Taylor Comeau.) | Colorado |
| Round 1 | 4 | (United States) | Ashley Sanchez | F | Washington Spirit | (Note: Utah Royals FC → Chicago Red Stars → Sky Blue FC → Washington Spirit. Washington Spirit acquired the No. 4, No. 13 and No. 17 picks in the 2020 NWSL College Draft and a first-round pick in the 2021 NWSL College Draft from Sky Blue FC in exchange for Mallory Pugh. Sky Blue FC acquired the No. 4 and No. 5 picks in the 2020 NWSL College Draft and $80,000 allocation money from Chicago Red Stars in exchange for the No. 2 and No. 3 picks in the 2020 NWSL College Draft. Chicago Red Stars acquired Utah Royals FC's first and second-round picks in the 2020 NWSL College Draft as well as the number one overall 2019 NWSL College Draft pick, another first-round draft pick in 2019 and Utah's natural first-round pick in 2021 in exchange for the rights to Christen Press and Samantha Johnson.) | UCLA |
| Round 1 | 5 | (Canada) | Evelyne Viens | F | Sky Blue FC | (Note: Washington Spirit → Chicago Red Stars → Sky Blue FC. Sky Blue FC acquired the No. 4 and No. 5 picks in the 2020 NWSL College Draft and $80,000 of allocation money from Chicago Red Stars in exchange for the No. 2 and No. 3 picks in the 2020 NWSL College Draft. Chicago Red Stars acquired Washington Spirit's natural first-round pick in the 2020 NWSL College Draft and a third-round pick (No. 20) in the 2019 NWSL College Draft in exchange for a first-round pick (No. 7) in the 2019 NWSL College Draft.) | South Florida |
| Round 1 | 6 | (United States) | Ally Watt | F | North Carolina Courage | (Note: Reign FC → Chicago Red Stars → North Carolina Courage. North Carolina Courage acquired the No. 6 pick from Chicago Red Stars in exchange for the No. 9 and No. 18 picks in the 2020 NWSL College Draft. Chicago Red Stars had acquired Reign FC's natural first-round pick in the 2020 NWSL College Draft in exchange for a 2019 international roster spot.) | Texas A&M |
| Round 1 | 7 | (United States) | Courtney Petersen | D | Orlando Pride | (Note: Portland Thorns FC → Orlando Pride. Orlando Pride received Portland Thorns FC's No. 7 pick in the 2020 NWSL College Draft as well as the No. 14 pick, Emily Sonnett and the rights to Caitlin Foord in exchange for the No. 1 overall pick in the 2020 NWSL College Draft.) | Virginia |
| Round 1 | 8 | (United States) | Tziarra King | F | Utah Royals FC | (Note: Chicago Red Stars → Utah Royals FC. Utah Royals FC acquired Chicago Red Stars' natural first-round pick in the 2020 NWSL College Draft in exchange for $60,000 of allocation money.) | NC State |
| Round 1 | 9 | (United States) | Kelcie Hedge | M | Reign FC | (Note: North Carolina Courage → Chicago Red Stars → Reign FC. Reign FC acquired the No. 9 pick in the 2020 NWSL College draft from Chicago Red Stars in exchange for Reign FC's natural third-round pick (No. 24) in the 2020 NWSL College Draft and natural first-round pick in the 2021 NWSL College Draft. Chicago Red Stars had received North Carolina Courage's No. 9 pick as well as the No. 18 pick in the 2020 NWSL College Draft in exchange for the No. 6 pick in the 2020 NWSL College Draft.) | Santa Clara |
| Round 2 | 10 | (Jamaica) | Konya Plummer | D | Orlando Pride | | UCF |
| Round 2 | 11 | (United States) | Kaleigh Riehl | D | Sky Blue FC | | Penn State |
| Round 2 | 12 | (United States) | Kate Del Fava | M | Utah Royals FC | (Note: Houston Dash → Utah Royals FC. Utah Royals FC received Houston Dash's natural second-round pick in the 2020 NWSL College Draft and natural second-round pick in the 2021 NWSL College Draft in exchange for Utah Royals FC's third-round pick in the 2020 NWSL College Draft and Katie Stengel.) | Illinois State |
| Round 2 | 13 | (United States) | Natalie Jacobs | M | Washington Spirit | (Note: Utah Royals FC → Chicago Red Stars → Sky Blue FC → Washington Spirit. Washington Spirit acquired the No. 4, No. 13 and No. 17 picks in the 2020 NWSL College Draft and a first-round pick in the 2021 NWSL College Draft from Sky Blue FC in exchange for Mallory Pugh. Sky Blue FC received Chicago Red Stars' highest first-round pick and a second-round pick in the 2020 NWSL College Draft in exchange for Savannah McCaskill. Chicago Red Stars had acquired the pick from Utah Royals FC along with a 2020 first-round pick, the number one overall 2019 NWSL College Draft pick, another first-round draft pick in 2019 and Utah's natural first-round pick in 2021 in exchange for the rights to Christen Press and Samantha Johnson.) | USC |
| Round 2 | 14 | (United States) | Phoebe McClernon | D | Orlando Pride | (Note: Washington Spirit → Portland Thorns FC → Orlando Pride. Orlando Pride received Portland Thorns FC's No. 14 pick in the 2020 NWSL College Draft as well as the No. 7 pick, Emily Sonnett and the rights to Caitlin Foord in exchange for the No. 1 overall pick in the 2020 NWSL College Draft. Portland Thorns FC acquired Washington Spirit's natural second-round pick in the 2020 NWSL College Draft and a fourth-round pick (No. 31) in the 2019 NWSL College Draft in exchange for a second-round pick (No. 17) in the 2019 NWSL College Draft.) | Virginia |
| Round 2 | 15 | (United States) | Julia Bingham | D | Chicago Red Stars | (Note: Reign FC → Portland Thorns FC → Chicago Red Stars. Chicago Red Stars acquired he No. 15 and No. 16 picks in the 2020 NWSL College Draft and $70,000 of allocation money from Portland Thorns FC in exchange the No. 2 pick in the 2020 NWSL College Draft. Portland Thorns FC received Reign FC's natural second-round pick in the 2020 NWSL College Draft and Caitlin Foord in exchange for Allie Long.) | USC |
| Round 2 | 16 | (United States) | Camryn Biegalski | D | Chicago Red Stars | (Note: Portland Thorns FC → Chicago Red Stars. Chicago Red Stars acquired he No. 15 and No. 16 picks in the 2020 NWSL College Draft and $70,000 of allocation money from Portland Thorns FC in exchange the No. 2 pick in the 2020 NWSL College Draft.) | Wisconsin |
| Round 2 | 17 | (United States) | Averie Collins | M | Washington Spirit | (Note: Chicago Red Stars → Sky Blue FC → Washington Spirit. Washington Spirit acquired the No. 4, No. 13 and No. 17 picks in the 2020 NWSL College Draft and a first-round pick in the 2021 NWSL College Draft from Sky Blue FC in exchange for Mallory Pugh. Sky Blue FC received Chicago Red Stars' highest second-round pick in the 2020 NWSL College Draft and a first-round pick (No. 6) in the 2019 NWSL College Draft in exchange for Katie Johnson.) | Washington State |
| Round 2 | 18 | (United States) | Bridgette Andrzejewski | F | Houston Dash | (Note: North Carolina Courage → Chicago Red Stars → Houston Dash. Houston Dash acquired the No. 18 pick and Katie Naughton from Chicago Red Stars in exchange for Kealia Ohai. Chicago Red Stars had received the No. 9 pick from North Carolina Courage along with the No. 18 pick in the 2020 NWSL College Draft in exchange for the No. 6 pick in the 2020 NWSL College Draft.) | North Carolina |
| Round 3 | 19 | (United States) | Zoe Morse | M | Chicago Red Stars | (Note: Orlando Pride → Chicago Red Stars. Chicago Red Stars acquired the No. 19 pick in the 2020 NWSL College Draft, Orlando's natural first-round selection in the 2021 NWSL College Draft, Rachel Hill and $50,000 of allocation money in exchange for the No. 3 and No. 26 picks in the 2020 NWSL College draft.) | Virginia |
| Round 3 | 20 | (United States) | Mandy McGlynn | G | Sky Blue FC | | Virginia Tech |
| Round 3 | 21 | (United States) | Cheyenne Shorts | D | Orlando Pride | (Note: Houston Dash → Orlando Pride. Orlando Pride received Houston Dash's natural third and fourth-round picks in the 2020 NWSL College Draft in exchange for Christine Nairn.) | Denver |
| Round 3 | 22 | (United States) | Chloe Castaneda^{#} | F | Houston Dash | (Note: Utah Royals FC → Houston Dash. Houston Dash received Utah Royals FC's natural third-round pick in the 2020 NWSL College Draft and Katie Stengel in exchange for Houston Dash's natural second-round picks in the 2020 and 2021 NWSL College Drafts.) | UCLA |
| Round 3 | 23 | (United States) | Katie McClure | F | Washington Spirit | | Kansas |
| Round 3 | 24 | (United States) | Ella Stevens | F | Chicago Red Stars | (Note: Reign FC → Chicago Red Stars. Chicago Red Stars acquired Reign FC's natural third-round pick (No. 24) in the 2020 NWSL College Draft and natural first-round pick in the 2021 NWSL College Draft in exchange for a first-round pick (No. 9) in the 2020 NWSL College Draft.) | Duke |
| Round 3 | 25 | (United States) | Meaghan Nally | D | Portland Thorns FC | | Georgetown |
| Round 3 | 26 | (Ghana) | Abi Kim | F | Orlando Pride | (Note: Chicago Red Stars → Orlando Pride. Orlando Pride acquired the No. 3 and No. 26 picks in the 2020 NWSL College draft in exchange for the No. 19 pick in the 2020 NWSL College Draft, Orlando's natural first-round selection in the 2021 NWSL College Draft, Rachel Hill and $50,000 of allocation money.) | California |
| Round 3 | 27 | (United States) | Sinclaire Miramontez | D | North Carolina Courage | | Nebraska |
| Round 4 | 28 | (United States) | Addisyn Merrick | D | North Carolina Courage | (Note: Orlando Pride → North Carolina Courage. North Carolina Courage received Orlando Pride's natural fourth-round pick in the 2020 NWSL College Draft in exchange for Morgan Reid.) | Kansas |
| Round 4 | 29 | (Jamaica) | Chantelle Swaby^{#} | M | Sky Blue FC | | Rutgers |
| Round 4 | 30 | (United States) | Chelsee Washington | M | Orlando Pride | (Note: Houston Dash → Orlando Pride. Orlando Pride received Houston Dash's natural third and fourth-round picks in the 2020 NWSL College Draft in exchange for Christine Nairn.) | Bowling Green |
| Round 4 | 31 | (United States) | Cyera Hintzen | F | Utah Royals FC | | Texas |
| Round 4 | 32 | (United States) | Kaiya McCullough^{#} | D | Washington Spirit | | UCLA |
| Round 4 | 33 | (United States) | Sam Hiatt | M | Reign FC | | Stanford |
| Round 4 | 34 | (United States) | Meg Brandt^{#} | M | Reign FC | (Note: Portland Thorns → Reign FC. Reign FC received Portland Thorns FC's natural fourth-round pick in the 2020 NWSL College Draft in exchange for Christen Westphal.) | Nebraska |
| Round 4 | 35 | (United States) | Aerial Chavarin | F | Chicago Red Stars | | Yale |
| Round 4 | 36 | (United States) | Bri Folds^{#} | M | North Carolina Courage | | Auburn |

=== Notable undrafted players ===
Below is a list of undrafted rookies who appeared in a competitive NWSL game in 2020.

| Nat. | Player | Pos. | Original NWSL team | College | Notes |
|---|---|---|---|---|---|
| (United States) | Machaela George | D | Reign FC | Santa Clara | |
| (United States) | Madison Hammond | D | Reign FC | Wake Forest | First Native American to play in the NWSL |
| (United States) | Kim Hazlett | D | Reign FC | Portland | |
| (United States) | Sarah Luebbert | F | Chicago Red Stars | Missouri | |
| (United States) | Meghan McCool | M | Washington Spirit | Virginia | |
| (United States) | Zoe Redei | F | Chicago Red Stars | North Carolina | |
| (United States) | Dani Rhodes | F | Chicago Red Stars | Wisconsin | |
| (United States) | Autumn Smithers | D | Portland Thorns FC | Notre Dame | |
| (United States) | Savanah Uveges | M | Orlando Pride | Nebraska | |
| (United States) | Brittany Wilson | G | Orlando Pride | Denver | |

== Trades ==
Round 1:

Round 2:

Round 3:

Round 4:

== Summary ==
In 2020, a total of 27 colleges had players selected. Of these, four had a player drafted to the NWSL for the first time: Auburn, Bowling Green, NC State and South Florida.

=== Schools with multiple draft selections ===
| Selections | Schools |
|---|---|
| 3 | UCLA, Virginia |
| 2 | Stanford, Kansas, Nebraska, USC, Washington State |

=== Selections by college athletic conference ===
| Conference | Round 1 | Round 2 | Round 3 | Round 4 | Total |
|---|---|---|---|---|---|
| ACC | 2 | 2 | 3 | 0 | 7 |
| Big East | 0 | 0 | 1 | 0 | 1 |
| Big Ten | 0 | 2 | 1 | 2 | 5 |
| Big 12 | 0 | 0 | 1 | 2 | 3 |
| Ivy League | 0 | 0 | 0 | 1 | 1 |
| Mid-American | 0 | 0 | 0 | 1 | 1 |
| Missouri Valley | 0 | 1 | 0 | 0 | 1 |
| Pac-12 | 4 | 3 | 2 | 2 | 11 |
| SEC | 1 | 0 | 0 | 1 | 2 |
| Summit | 0 | 0 | 1 | 0 | 1 |
| The American | 1 | 1 | 0 | 0 | 2 |
| West Coast | 1 | 0 | 0 | 0 | 1 |

=== Selections by position ===
| Position | Round 1 | Round 2 | Round 3 | Round 4 | Total |
|---|---|---|---|---|---|
| Goalkeeper | 0 | 0 | 1 | 0 | 1 |
| Defender | 1 | 5 | 3 | 2 | 11 |
| Midfielder | 2 | 3 | 1 | 5 | 11 |
| Forward | 6 | 1 | 4 | 2 | 13 |

== See also ==
- List of NWSL drafts
- List of National Women's Soccer League draftees by college team
- 2020 National Women's Soccer League season
