= Savanah Uveges =

American soccer player

Personal information
- Full name: Savanah Jayn Uveges
- Date of birth: June 9, 1996 (age 30)
- Place of birth: Bartlett, Illinois, United States
- Height: 5 ft 10 in (1.78 m)
- Position: Midfielder

College career
Years	Team	Apps	(Gls)
2014–2019	Nebraska Cornhuskers	44	(11)

Senior career*
Years	Team	Apps	(Gls)
2020	Orlando Pride	0	(0)
2021–2022	MSV Duisburg	18	(5)

Managerial career
- 2023–: Nebraska Cornhuskers (volunteer assistant)
- * Club domestic league appearances and goals

Savanah Jayn Uveges (born June 9, 1996) is an American soccer coach and former player who serves as a volunteer assistant coach for Nebraska Cornhuskers. She played as a midfielder for Orlando Pride in the National Women's Soccer League (NWSL) and for MSV Duisburg in the German 2. Bundesliga.

== Early life ==
Uveges grew up in Bartlett, Illinois and was a two-sport athlete in soccer and basketball at South Elgin High School. She set several school records including most goals in a season (23) and most goals in a game (5). She was an all-conference, all-area and all-sectional selection.

=== Nebraska Cornhuskers ===
Uveges played college soccer for the Nebraska Cornhuskers between 2014 and 2019. After suffering two ACL tears while in high school, Uveges suffered another two in college, keeping her sidelined and unable to make an appearance in her first three seasons with the team. As a junior Uveges made 17 appearances, scoring her first career goal on August 25, 2017, in a 3–0 win over South Dakota Coyotes. As a senior, Uveges started in all 21 games during the 2018 season and received third-team All-Big Ten honors. Injury sidelined Uveges for much of 2019, limiting her to six appearances.

== Professional career ==
=== Orlando Pride ===
Uveges declared for the 2020 NWSL College Draft but was not selected. In February 2020 she briefly spent some time on trial in Sweden with second-tier Elitettan team IFK Kalmar, playing in a preseason friendly against Lidköping FK.

Uveges returned to the United States in March 2020, joining NWSL team Orlando Pride as a preseason trialist. However, preseason was canceled three days into camp amid the COVID-19 pandemic. On 8 September 2020, with the 2020 NWSL season dealing with significant disruption during the pandemic, Uveges was one of seven players signed to a short-term contract with Orlando in order to compete in the Fall Series following the team's decision to loan out 11 senior players to play regularly overseas. Uveges made her debut on September 26, 2020, starting in a 3–1 defeat to Houston Dash. She appeared in two Fall Series matches for a combined 56 minutes.

=== MSV Duisburg ===
On July 24, 2021, Uveges signed for German 2. Bundesliga side MSV Duisburg.

== Coaching career ==
In February 2023, she retired from her playing career, and was named a volunteer assistant coach at Nebraska Cornhuskers.

== Personal life ==
She married her husband, Avery Anderson-Baer, in December 2021.

== Career statistics ==
Club	Season	League			National Cup (Note: DFB-Pokal)		Other		Total	
Club	Season	Division	Apps	Goals	Apps	Goals	Apps	Goals	Apps	Goals
Orlando Pride	2020	NWSL	—		—		2 (Note: Includes the NWSL Fall Series)	0	2	0
MSV Duisburg	2021–22	2. Bundesliga	18	5	2	3	—		20	8
Career total			18	5	2	3	2	0	22	8
