= Alika Keene =

Jamaican footballer (born 1994)

Personal information
- Full name: Alika Isis Keene
- Date of birth: 15 January 1994 (age 32)
- Place of birth: Mount Dora, Florida, U.S.
- Position: Defender

Youth career
- Eustis Panthers

College career
Years	Team	Apps	(Gls)
2012–2015	Harvard Crimson	65	(0)

Senior career*
Years	Team	Apps	(Gls)
2019	Orlando Pride	0	(0)
2020–2021	Gintra	36	(17)
2022	Győri ETO		
2022–2024	Slavia Prague		

International career
2010	Jamaica U17	3	(0)
2012	Jamaica U20	3	(0)
2022–	Jamaica	1	(1)
- * Club domestic league appearances and goals

Alika Isis Keene (born 15 January 1994) is a footballer who plays as a defender. Born in the United States, she represents Jamaica internationally.

== Career ==
Before the 2012 season, Keene joined the Harvard Crimson in the United States. Before the 2019 season, she signed for American top flight club Orlando Pride. Before the 2020 season, she signed for Gintra in Lithuania. In 2021, Keene participated in Lithuanian reality television show X Faktorius.
