= 2020 National Women's Soccer League season =

Eighth season of the National Women's Soccer League

National Women's Soccer League
- Season: 2020
- Champions: Canceled
- NWSL Shield: Canceled
- Challenge Cup: Houston Dash
- Community Shield: Portland Thorns FC

The 2020 National Women's Soccer League season was the eighth season of the National Women's Soccer League, the top division of women's soccer in the United States. Including the NWSL's two professional predecessors, Women's Professional Soccer (2009–2011) and the Women's United Soccer Association (2001–2003), it was the 14th overall season of FIFA and USSF-sanctioned top division women's soccer in the United States.

The league was operated by the United States Soccer Federation and received major financial backing from that body. Further financial backing was provided by the Canadian Soccer Association. Both national federations pay the league salaries of many of their respective national team members in an effort to nurture talent in those nations and lighten the financial burden of individual clubs.

The season was scheduled to start on April 18 and end on October 18. The top four teams were to advance to the NWSL Playoffs, with the two semifinal matches on November 8 and the 2020 NWSL Championship on November 14 at a predetermined venue.

On March 12, 2020, the preseason match schedule was cancelled due to the COVID-19 pandemic. As a result, the NWSL announced on March 20 that the regular season start would be delayed.

On May 27, 2020, the NWSL announced that the 2020 NWSL regular season and playoffs were canceled due to the pandemic, and that the 2020 Challenge Cup would mark the league's return to action. The 25-game tournament, held from June 27 to July 26, was hosted by the owner of Utah Royals FC, Dell Loy Hansen. On June 22, 2020, the NWSL announced the full rules and regulations for the 2020 Challenge Cup. The Houston Dash won the 2020 Challenge Cup.

On August 25, 2020, the NWSL announced a Fall Series, in which each NWSL team would play four games in September and October. To minimize travel and COVID-19 exposure, the nine teams were divided into three three-team regional pods. Portland Thorns FC won the Fall Series and associated Verizon Community Shield.

== Teams, stadiums, and personnel ==
=== Stadiums and locations ===
Team	Stadium	Capacity
Chicago Red Stars	SeatGeek Stadium	20,000
Houston Dash	BBVA Stadium	7,000 (22,039) (Note: The Dash do not make their stadium's entire capacity available for home games, instead restricting ticket sales at a lower level. The full capacity of this venue is included in parentheses and italics.)
North Carolina Courage	Sahlen's Stadium at WakeMed Soccer Park	10,000
OL Reign	Cheney Stadium	6,500
Orlando Pride	Exploria Stadium	25,500
Portland Thorns FC	Providence Park	25,218
Sky Blue FC	Red Bull Arena	25,000
Utah Royals FC	Rio Tinto Stadium	20,213
Washington Spirit (Note: In 2020, the Spirit were scheduled to play four games at each of the three stadiums.)	Audi Field	20,000
Washington Spirit	Segra Field	5,000
Washington Spirit	Maryland SoccerPlex	4,000

Locations of the National Women's Soccer League teams in 2020.

=== Personnel and sponsorship ===
Note: All teams use Nike as their kit manufacturer.

Team	Head coach	Captain	Shirt sponsor
Chicago Red Stars	(United States) Rory Dames	(United States) Julie Ertz	Meijer
Houston Dash	(England) James Clarkson	(United States) Jane Campbell (England) Rachel Daly	MD Anderson Cancer Center
North Carolina Courage	(England) Paul Riley	(New Zealand) Abby Erceg	Continental AG
OL Reign	(France) Farid Benstiti	(United States) Megan Rapinoe (United States) Lauren Barnes	Zulily
Orlando Pride	(England) Marc Skinner	(United States) Ashlyn Harris	Orlando Health
Portland Thorns FC	(England) Mark Parsons	(Canada) Christine Sinclair	Providence Health & Services
Sky Blue FC	(England) Freya Coombe	(United States) Sarah Woldmoe	Hackensack Meridian Health
Utah Royals FC	(United States) Amy LePeilbet (interim)	(United States) Amy Rodriguez	Soleil Energy
Washington Spirit	(England) Richie Burke	(United States) Tori Huster (United States) Andi Sullivan	CVS Health

=== Coaching changes ===
Team	Outgoing manager	Manner of departure	Date of vacancy	Incoming manager	Date of appointment	Ref.
OL Reign	(North Macedonia) Vlatko Andonovski	Resignation	October 28, 2019	(France) Farid Benstiti	January 17, 2020	
Sky Blue FC	(England) Freya Coombe	End of interim period	December 17, 2019	(England) Freya Coombe	December 17, 2019	
Utah Royals FC	(England) Laura Harvey	Mutual separation	January 6, 2020	(England) Scott Parkinson (interim)	January 6, 2020	
Utah Royals FC	(England) Scott Parkinson (interim)	End of interim period	February 7, 2020	(England) Craig Harrington	February 7, 2020	
Utah Royals FC	(England) Craig Harrington	Administrative leave of absence (Note: The Royals terminated Harrington's contract on November 9, 2020.)	September 20, 2020	(United States) Amy LePeilbet (interim)	September 20, 2020	

== Attendance ==
Due to the COVID-19 pandemic, games in both the Challenge Cup and Fall Series were played behind closed doors.

== Challenge Cup ==
Hosted by Dell Loy Hansen, owner of Utah Royals FC, the 2020 NWSL Challenge Cup featured a preliminary round and knockout rounds. In the preliminary round, all nine teams were to play four games each. The top eight teams based on results from the preliminary round were to advance to a single-elimination knockout bracket, with seeding based on position in the preliminary-round standings. Before the tournament began, the Orlando Pride dropped out because of positive COVID-19 tests, and only eight teams played. The preliminary round therefore did not eliminate any teams and was played only for seeding the knockout rounds.

=== Preliminary round ===
Pos	Team	Pld	W	D	L	GF	GA	GD	Pts
1	North Carolina Courage	4	4	0	0	7	1	+6	12
2	Washington Spirit	4	2	1	1	4	4	0	7
3	OL Reign	4	1	2	1	1	2	−1	5
4	Houston Dash	4	1	1	2	5	6	−1	4
5	Utah Royals FC (H)	4	1	1	2	4	5	−1	4
6	Chicago Red Stars	4	1	1	2	2	3	−1	4 (Note: Chicago Red Stars won the tiebreaker against Sky Blue FC on fewer yellow cards (1 to 4).)
7	Sky Blue FC	4	1	1	2	2	3	−1	4
8	Portland Thorns FC	4	0	3	1	2	3	−1	3

Source: NWSL
Rules for classification: Tiebreakers
(H) Host

=== Knockout round ===
Quarter-finals
July 17 – Zions Bank Stadium
Q1 North Carolina Courage	0
Q8 Portland Thorns FC	1
July 17 – Zions Bank Stadium
Q5 Utah Royals FC	0 (2)
Q4 Houston Dash (p)	0 (3)
July 18 – Zions Bank Stadium
Q3 OL Reign	0 (3)
Q6 Chicago Red Stars (p)	0 (4)
July 18 – Zions Bank Stadium
Q7 Sky Blue FC (p)	0 (4)
Q2 Washington Spirit	0 (3)

Semi-finals
July 22 – Rio Tinto Stadium
Portland Thorns FC	0
Houston Dash	1
July 22 – Rio Tinto Stadium
Chicago Red Stars	3
Sky Blue FC	2

Final
July 26 – Rio Tinto Stadium
Houston Dash	2
Chicago Red Stars	0

== Fall Series ==
The nine NWSL teams were divided into three regional "pods" of three teams each. Within each pod, the teams played a four-game, home-and-away schedule (i.e., two games against each of the two other teams) between September 5 and October 17.

Northeast	South	West
Chicago Red Stars; Sky Blue FC; Washington Spirit	Houston Dash; North Carolina Courage; Orlando Pride	OL Reign; Portland Thorns FC; Utah Royals FC

The NWSL announced the full schedule of the Fall Series on September 3, 2020. One day later, the NWSL announced that the winners of the Fall Series would receive the Community Shield trophy, named the Verizon Community Shield for sponsorship reasons, and a grant of $25,000 to present to their chosen community partner; $15,000 and $10,000 would be presented to community partners of the second- and third-place teams, respectively.

The Portland Thorns won the Fall Series and the 2020 Community Shield, and directed the accompanying $25,000 grant to Mimi's Fresh Tees, a Portland-area company specializing in social justice apparel. The Houston Dash were second and directed the corresponding $15,000 grant to the Houston branch of the civil rights organization NAACP. The Washington Spirit were third and directed the corresponding $10,000 grant to DC SCORES, which uses poetry and neighborhood soccer teams to help children in need.

=== Northeast Pod ===
Pos	Team	Pld	W	D	L	GF	GA	GD	Pts	WAS	SKY	CHI
1	Washington Spirit	4	2	1	1	5	4	+1	7	—	1–2	2–1
2	Sky Blue FC	4	2	0	2	6	7	−1	6	0–1	—	3–1
3	Chicago Red Stars	4	1	1	2	7	7	0	4	1–1	4–1	—

Source: NWSL

=== South Pod ===
Pos	Team	Pld	W	D	L	GF	GA	GD	Pts	HOU	NC	ORL
1	Houston Dash	4	3	0	1	12	7	+5	9	—	4–1	3–1
2	North Carolina Courage	4	1	2	1	8	10	−2	5	4–3	—	0–0
3	Orlando Pride	4	0	2	2	5	8	−3	2	1–2	3–3	—

Source: NWSL

=== West Pod ===
Pos	Team	Pld	W	D	L	GF	GA	GD	Pts	POR	OLR	UTA
1	Portland Thorns FC	4	3	1	0	10	3	+7	10	—	4–1	3–0
2	OL Reign	4	1	1	2	6	8	−2	4	1–2	—	2–0
3	Utah Royals FC	4	0	2	2	3	8	−5	2	1–1	2–2	—

Source: NWSL

=== Overall standings ===
Pos	Team	Pld	W	D	L	GF	GA	GD	Pts	Qualification
1	Portland Thorns FC (C)	4	3	1	0	10	3	+7	10	Community Shield
2	Houston Dash	4	3	0	1	12	7	+5	9	Runners-up
3	Washington Spirit	4	2	1	1	5	4	+1	7	Third place
4	Sky Blue FC	4	2	0	2	6	7	−1	6	
5	North Carolina Courage	4	1	2	1	8	10	−2	5	
6	Chicago Red Stars	4	1	1	2	7	7	0	4	
7	OL Reign	4	1	1	2	6	8	−2	4	
8	Orlando Pride	4	0	2	2	5	8	−3	2	
9	Utah Royals FC	4	0	2	2	3	8	−5	2	

Source: NWSL
Rules for classification: Tiebreakers
(C) Champions

== Individual awards ==
As the regular season and the playoffs were canceled due to the COVID-19 pandemic, regular awards (including season, team and player of the month, and weekly awards) were not awarded.
