= List of Orlando Pride records and statistics =

Orlando Pride is an American professional soccer team based in Orlando, Florida, that competes in the National Women's Soccer League (NWSL).

This is a list of franchise records which date from the team's inaugural NWSL season in 2016 to present.

All stats accurate as of match played October 2, 2026.

== Honors ==
NWSL Championship: 1

- Winners: 2024

NWSL Shield: 1

- Winners: 2024

== Player records ==
=== Appearances ===
- Youngest first-team player: Amanda Allen – **18 years, 74 days** (against Racing Louisville, May 6, 2023)
- Oldest first-team player (goalkeeper): Erin McLeod – **39 years, 217 days** (against OL Reign, October 1, 2022)
- Oldest first-team player (outfield): Marta – **40 years, 225 days** (against San Diego Wave FC, October 2, 2026)

Most appearances

#	Pos.	Name	Nationality	Years	NWSL	Cup	Playoffs	Other	Total
1	Forward	**Marta**	Brazil	2017–present	153	7	6	5	171
2	Defender	**Kerry Abello**	United States	2022–present	102	11	5	0	118
3	Defender	**Kylie Nadaner**	United States	2021–present	91	13	3	0	107
4	Goalkeeper	**Anna Moorhouse**	England	2022–present	91	8	5	1	105
5	Defender	Toni Pressley	United States	2016–2022	81	8	1	4	94
6	Forward	**Julie Doyle**	United States	2022–present	74	10	5	4	93
7	Goalkeeper	Ashlyn Harris	United States	2016–2021	81	4	1	3	89
8	Midfielder	**Summer Yates**	United States	2023–present	74	7	3	4	88
9	Defender	Ali Krieger	United States	2017–2021	78	3	1	4	86
10	Midfielder	Dani Weatherholt	United States	2016–2019	73	0	1	0	74

As of Matches played on October 2, 2026

Bolded players are currently on the Orlando Pride roster.

=== Goals ===
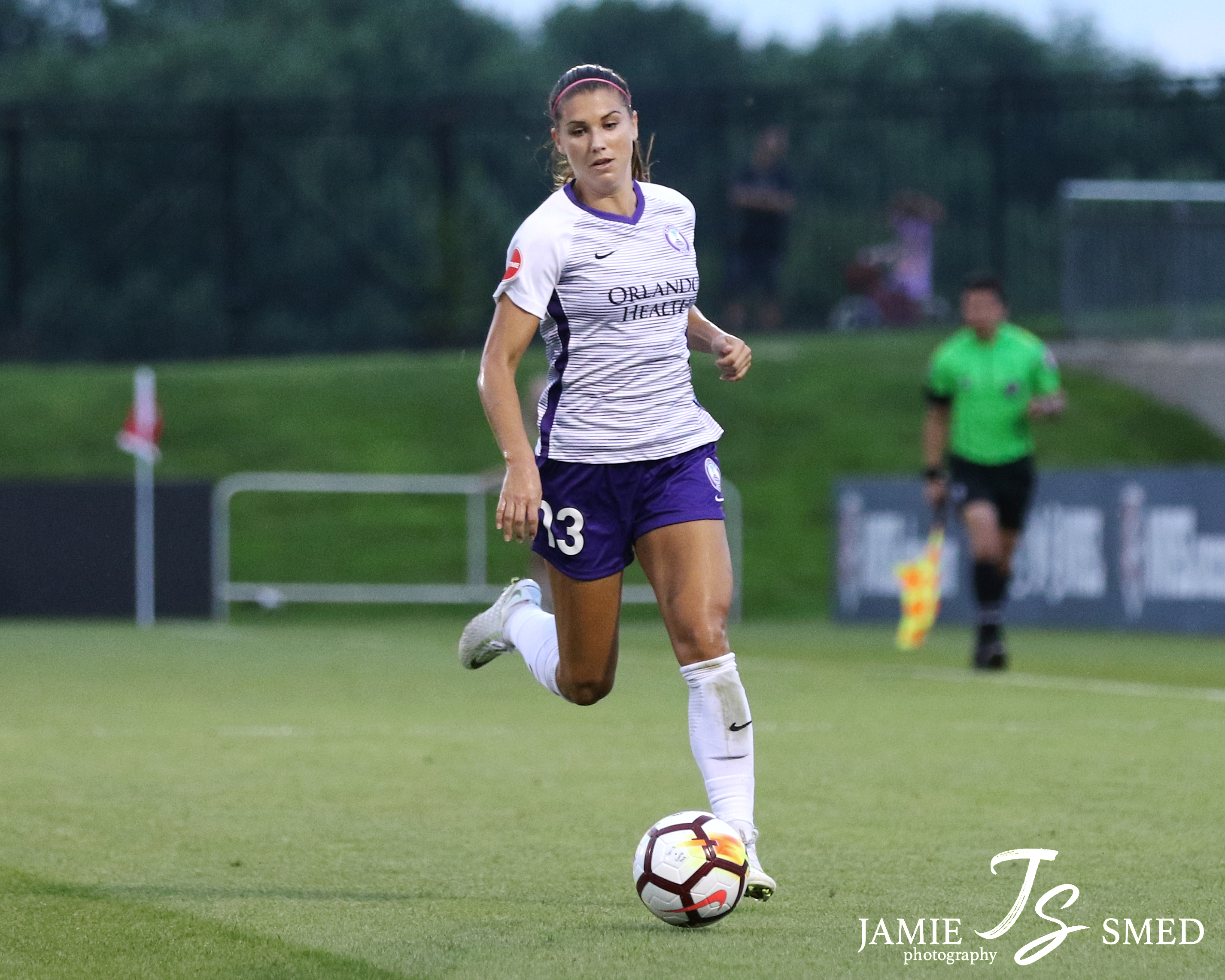
Alex Morgan is currently Orlando Pride's third highest all-time goalscorer.

- Youngest goalscorer: Danica Evans – **21 years, 324 days** (against Washington Spirit, April 22, 2017)
- Oldest goalscorer: Marta – **40 years, 141 days** (against Kansas City Current, July 10, 2026)
- Most goals in a season in all competitions: **17** – Barbra Banda, 2024
- Most League goals in a season: **16** – Barbra Banda, 2026
- Most goals scored in a match: **3** Barbra Banda v Utah Royals, May 23, 2025
- Goals in consecutive league matches: **5 consecutive matches** – Alex Morgan, August 5, 2017 to September 2, 2017
- Fastest goal: **0 minutes 39 seconds** – Ally Watt v North Carolina Courage, September 17, 2023
- Latest goal (not AET): **90+7 minutes 53 seconds** – Darian Jenkins v Washington Spirit, May 27, 2022
- Fastest hat-trick: **38 minutes** Barbra Banda v Utah Royals, May 23, 2025
- Most hat-tricks: **1** Barbra Banda v Utah Royals, May 23, 2025

Overall goals

Competitive, professional matches only, appearances including substitutes appear in brackets.

#	Pos.	Name	Nationality	Years	NWSL	Cup	Playoffs	Other	Total	Goals per game
1	Forward	**Marta**	Brazil	2017–present	46 (158)	0 (7)	2 (6)	1 (5)	**49** (165)	0.3
2	Forward	**Barbra Banda**	Zambia	2024–present	38 (62)	0 (1)	4 (3)	0 (0)	**42** (66)	0.64
3	Forward	Alex Morgan	United States	2016–2021	23 (66)	0 (2)	0 (1)	0 (0)	**23** (69)	0.33
4	Forward	Sydney Leroux	United States	2018–2022	16 (53)	1 (7)	0 (0)	1 (3)	**18** (63)	0.29
5	Defender	**Haley McCutcheon**	United States	2022–present	10 (100)	0 (5)	3 (5)	0 (1)	**13** (111)	0.12
6	Forward	Adriana	Brazil	2023–2024	12 (42)	0 (1)	0 (3)	0 (0)	**12** (46)	0.26
6	Forward	Chioma Ubogagu	England	2017–2019	12 (57)	0 (0)	0 (1)	0 (0)	**12** (58)	0.21
8	Forward	Rachel Hill	United States	2017–2019	11 (59)	0 (0)	0 (1)	0 (0)	**11** (60)	0.18
9	Midfielder	Kristen Edmonds	United States	2016–2020	9 (69)	0 (0)	0 (1)	1 (3)	**10** (73)	0.14
9	Forward	**Julie Doyle**	United States	2022–present	7 (67)	1 (10)	0 (5)	2 (4)	**10** (85)	0.12

As of Matches played on September 19, 2026

Bolded players are currently on the Orlando Pride roster.

=== Goalkeeping ===
- Youngest goalkeeper: Lainey Burdett – **22 years, 287 days** (against Washington Spirit, October 5, 2019)
- Oldest goalkeeper: Erin McLeod – **39 years, 217 days** (against OL Reign, October 1, 2022)

Most shutouts

Competitive, professional matches only, appearances including substitutes appear in brackets.

#	Pos.	Name	Nationality	Years	NWSL	Cup	Playoffs	Other	Total	Conceded per game
1	Goalkeeper	**Anna Moorhouse**	England	2022–present	34 (91)	0 (9)	2 (4)	0 (0)	**36** (104)	1.21
2	Goalkeeper	Ashlyn Harris	United States	2016–2021	15 (81)	2 (4)	0 (1)	1 (3)	**18** (89)	1.51
3	Goalkeeper	Erin McLeod	Canada	2020–2022	5 (26)	1 (2)	0 (0)	0 (0)	**6** (28)	1.75
4	Goalkeeper	Aubrey Bledsoe	United States	2016–2017	2 (12)	0 (0)	0 (0)	0 (0)	**2** (12)	1.42
4	Goalkeeper	**Cosette Morché**	United States	2015–present	2 (8)	0 (0)	0 (0)	0 (0)	**2** (8)	1.63
5	Goalkeeper	Haley Kopmeyer	United States	2018–2019	1 (13)	0 (0)	0 (0)	0 (0)	**1** (13)	1.92

As of Matches played on September 6, 2026

Bolded players are currently on the Orlando Pride roster.

== Team records ==
=== Record wins ===
- Record NWSL regular season win

6–0 vs Utah Royals, June 21, 2024
6–0 vs Chicago Stars FC, March 14, 2025

- Record playoff win: 4–1 vs Chicago Red Stars, November 8, 2024
- Record NWSL Challenge Cup win: 1–0 vs Washington Spirit, April 21, 2021
- Record home win

6–0 vs Utah Royals, June 21, 2024
6–0 vs Chicago Stars FC, March 14, 2025

- Record road win:

5–2 vs Chicago Red Stars, May 26, 2018
3–0 vs Washington Spirit, July 1, 2023
3–0 vs Angel City FC, June 30, 2024
3–0 vs Chicago Stars, March 25, 2026

=== Record defeats ===
- Record NWSL regular season defeat: 0–6 vs Portland Thorns, June 19, 2022
- Record playoff defeat: 1–4 vs Portland Thorns FC, October 7, 2017
- Record NWSL Challenge Cup defeat: 0–5 vs North Carolina Courage, July 29, 2023
- Record home defeat:

0–3 vs North Carolina Courage, June 30, 2018
0–3 vs North Carolina Courage, June 1, 2019
0–3 vs NJ/NY Gotham FC, May 1, 2022
0–3 vs North Carolina Courage, September 21, 2022

- Record road defeat: 0–6 vs Portland Thorns, June 19, 2022

=== Highest scores ===
Orlando Pride score listed first

- Highest scoring NWSL regular season game: 7 goals

2–5 vs Seattle Reign FC, July 23, 2016
3–4 vs North Carolina Courage, May 23, 2018
5–2 vs Chicago Red Stars, May 26, 2018
4–3 vs Washington Spirit, July 6, 2019
3–4 vs Portland Thorns FC, July 14, 2019
1–6 vs North Carolina Courage, September 14, 2019
2–5 vs Chicago Stars FC, September 7, 2025

- Highest scoring playoff game: 5 goals

1–4 vs Portland Thorns FC, October 7, 2017
4–1 vs Chicago Red Stars, November 8, 2024
3–2 vs Kansas City Current, November 17, 2024

- Highest scoring NWSL Challenge Cup game: 6 goals

2–4 vs North Carolina Courage, April 16, 2022
2–4 vs Washington Spirit, May 10, 2023

- Highest scoring home game: 7 goals

3–4 vs North Carolina Courage, May 23, 2018
4–3 vs Washington Spirit, July 6, 2019

- Highest scoring road game: 7 goals

2–5 vs Seattle Reign FC, July 23, 2016
5–2 vs Chicago Red Stars, May 26, 2018
3–4 vs Portland Thorns FC, July 14, 2019
1–6 vs North Carolina Courage, September 14, 2019
2–5 vs Chicago Stars FC, September 6, 2026

=== Streaks ===
- Longest unbeaten run (competitive matches): 27 matches, October 15, 2023 to October 11, 2024
- Longest unbeaten run (NWSL regular season): 24 matches, October 15, 2023 to October 11, 2024
- Longest winning streak (competitive matches): 8 matches, April 12, 2024 to June 7, 2024
- Longest winning streak (NWSL regular season): 8 matches, April 12, 2024 to June 7, 2024
- Longest tying streak (competitive matches): 3 matches

July 17, 2022 to August 13, 2022
March 16, 2024 to March 29, 2024
July 20, 2024 to August 23, 2024
August 3, 2025 to August 16, 2025

- Longest tying streak (NWSL regular season): 3 matches

July 17, 2022 to August 13, 2022
March 16, 2024 to March 29, 2024
August 3, 2025 to August 16, 2025

- Longest losing streak (competitive matches): 6 matches, August 11, 2018 to April 21, 2019
- Longest losing streak (NWSL regular season): 6 matches

August 11, 2018 to April 21, 2019
September 26, 2021 to May 8, 2022

- Longest streak without a win (competitive matches): 15 matches, July 21, 2018 to June 22, 2019
- Longest streak without a win (NWSL regular season): 15 matches, July 21, 2018 to June 22, 2019
- Longest scoring run (competitive matches): 16 matches, September 17, 2023 to June 15, 2024
- Longest scoring run (NWSL regular season): 16 matches, September 17, 2023 to June 15, 2024
- Longest scoreless run (competitive matches): 4 matches, October 29, 2021 to April 3, 2022
- Longest scoreless run (NWSL regular season): 3 matches

May 28, 2016 to June 23, 2016
September 8, 2018 to April 21, 2019
June 3, 2022 to July 3, 2022
September 9, 2022 to September 25, 2022
August 16, 2025 to August 29, 2025

- Longest streak without conceding a goal (competitive matches): 5 matches, August 23, 2024 to September 28, 2024
- Longest streak without conceding a goal (NWSL regular season): 5 matches, August 23, 2024 to September 28, 2024
- Longest streak without a shutout (competitive matches): 24 matches, June 27, 2018 to July 20, 2019
- Longest streak without a shutout (NWSL regular season): 24 matches, June 27, 2018 to July 20, 2019

== Coaching records ==
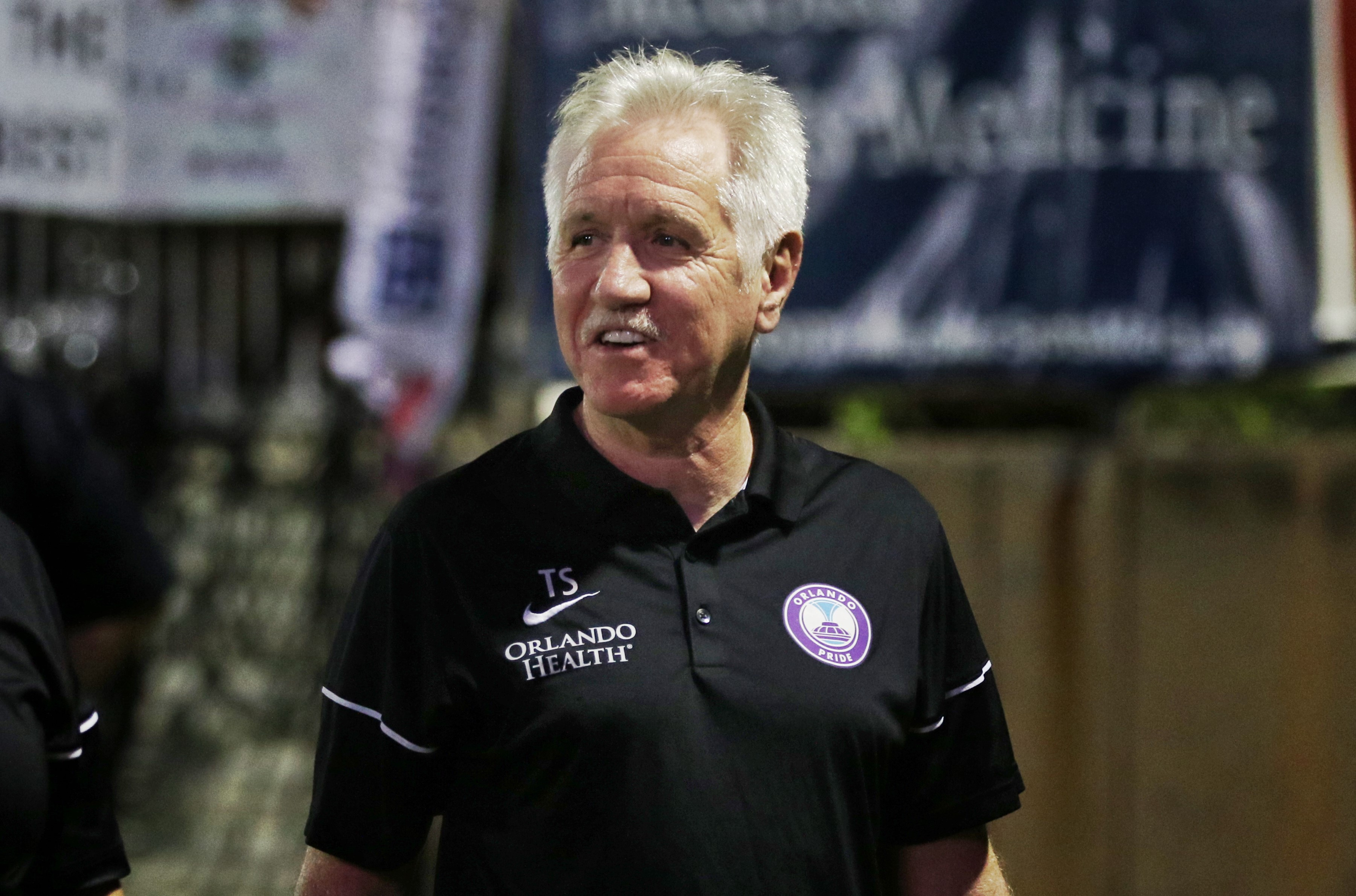
Tom Sermanni is the longest serving Pride head coach.

- First head coach: Tom Sermanni – Sermanni was named as Orlando Pride's first head coach when the team's expansion was announced in October 2015.
- Longest-serving head coach: Tom Sermanni – 3 years, 5 days (108 matches) (November 11, 2022 to November 16, 2025)

All-time Orlando Pride coaching stats
Name	Nationality	From	To	P	W	D	L	GF	GA	Win% (Note: Win% is rounded to two decimal places)
Tom Sermanni	Scotland	October 20, 2015	September 14, 2018	69	25	14	30	96	102	36.23
Marc Skinner	England	January 14, 2019	July 23, 2021	43	9	12	22	46	77	20.93
Carl Green (interim)	England	July 23, 2021	July 24, 2021	1	0	0	1	0	2	0.00
Becky Burleigh (interim)	United States	July 25, 2021	October 30, 2021	12	3	3	6	13	17	25.00
Amanda Cromwell	United States	December 7, 2021	October 10, 2022 (Note: Suspended from June 7, 2022)	13	2	4	7	13	28	15.38
Seb Hines	England	June 7, 2022 (Note: Interim from June 7, 2022 until November 11, 2022)	August 31, 2026	130	56	28	46	174	163	43.08
Yolanda Thomas (interim)	Sweden	August 31, 2026 (Note: Interim from August 31, 2026)	present	5	2	1	2	10	10	40.00
Total				273	97	62	114	352	399	35.53

As of Matches played on October 2, 2026

== List of seasons ==
Seasonal statistics for the Orlando Pride
Season	NWSL regular season							Position	Playoffs	Summer Cup	Challenge Cup	CONCACAF W Champions Cup	Top scorer		Avg. attendance
Season	P	W	D	L	GF	GA	Pts	Position	Playoffs	Summer Cup	Challenge Cup	CONCACAF W Champions Cup	Player	Goals	Avg. attendance
2016	20	6	1	13	20	30	19	9th	DNQ	NH	NH	NH	(United States) Kristen Edmonds	6	8,785
2017	24	11	7	6	45	31	40	3rd	SF	NH	NH	NH	(Brazil) Marta	13	6,186
2018	24	8	6	10	30	36	30	7th	DNQ	NH	NH	NH	(United States) Sydney Leroux	6	4,837
2019	24	4	4	16	24	53	16	9th	DNQ	NH	NH	NH	(Brazil) Marta	6	5,565
2020	NWSL season not contested									DNP	NH	NH	(United States) Marisa Viggiano	2	N/A
2021	24	7	7	10	27	32	28	8th	DNQ	NH	NH	Group stage	(United States) Sydney Leroux	9	4,227
2022	22	5	7	10	22	45	22	10th	DNQ	NH	NH	Group stage	(United States) Darian Jenkins (Iceland) Gunnhildur Jónsdóttir	4	4,385
2023	22	10	1	11	27	28	31	7th	DNQ	NH	NH	Group stage	(United States) Messiah Bright	7	5,504
2024	26	18	6	2	46	20	60	1st	W	Group stage	DNQ	NH	(Zambia) Barbra Banda	17	8,340
2025	26	11	7	8	33	27	40	4th	SF	NH	RU	Group stage	(Zambia) Barbra Banda	8	9,623
2026	27	10	3	14	35	42	33	11th	TBD	NH	DNQ	DNQ	(Zambia) Barbra Banda	17	

1. Goals scored in all competitions
2. Goals scored in Fall Series

== Individual honors ==
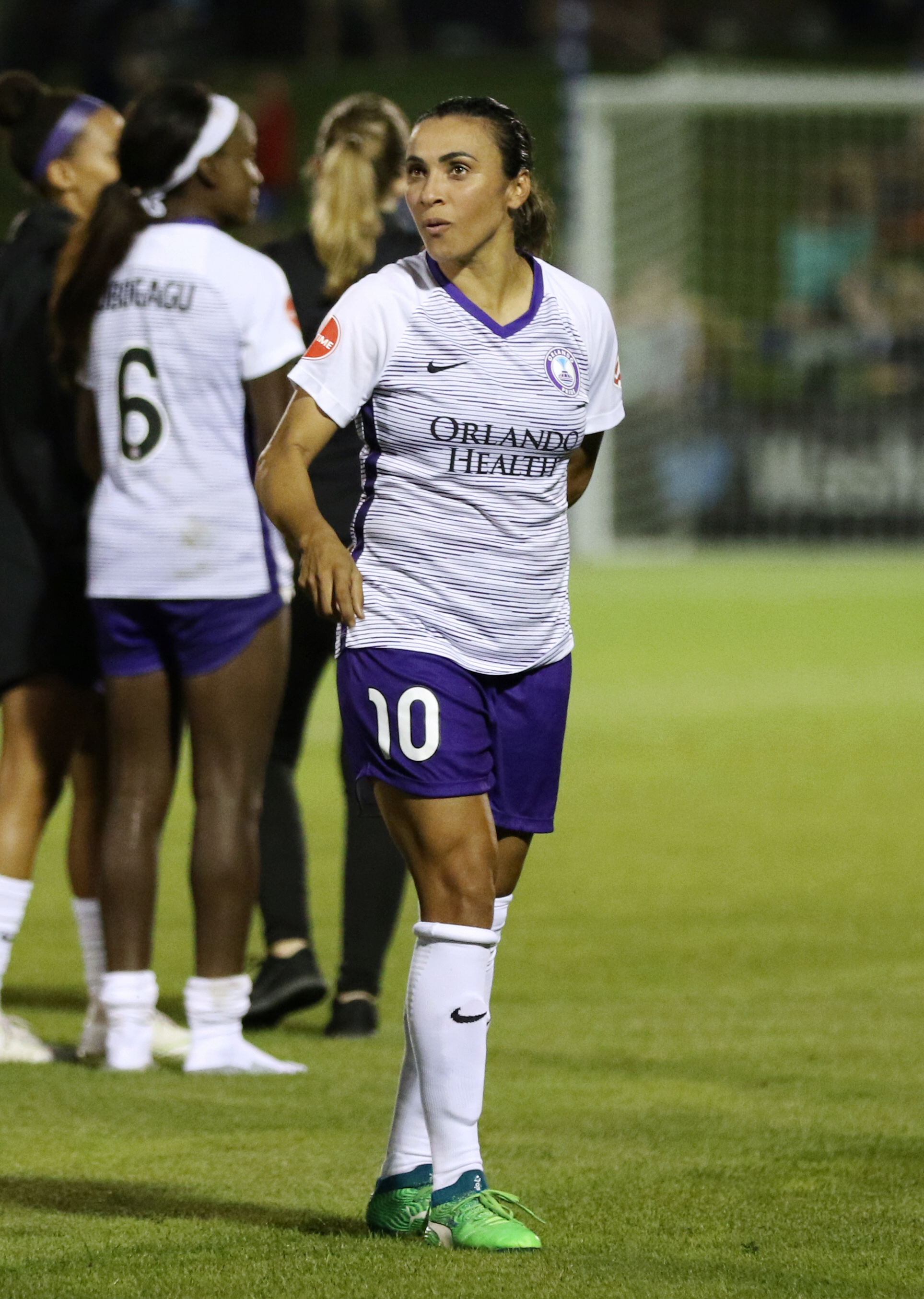
Six-time World Player of the Year Marta joined Orlando Pride in 2017.

NWSL Player of the Month

Number of wins in brackets.

Month	Player	Ref
August 2017	(United States) Alex Morgan	
September 2017	(Brazil) Marta	
May 2021	(United States) Alex Morgan (2)	
August 2023	(United States) Messiah Bright	
May 2024	(Zambia) Barbra Banda	

NWSL Team of the Year

Number of wins in brackets.

Year	Position	Player	Ref
2016	Goalkeeper	(United States) Ashlyn Harris	
2017	Defender	(United States) Ali Krieger	
2017	Forward	(Brazil) Marta	
2019	Defender	(United States) Ali Krieger (2)	
2024	Defender	(United States) Emily Sams	
2024	Midfielder	(Brazil) Marta (2)	
2024	Forward	(Zambia) Barbra Banda	

NWSL Midfielder of the Year

Number of wins in brackets.

Year	Player	Ref
2024	(Brazil) Marta	

NWSL Defender of the Year

Number of wins in brackets.

Year	Player	Ref
2024	(United States) Emily Sams	

NWSL Goalkeeper of the Year

Number of wins in brackets.

Year	Player	Ref
2016	(United States) Ashlyn Harris	

NWSL Coach of the Year

Number of wins in brackets.

Year	Player	Ref
2024	(England) Seb Hines	

The Best FIFA Women's Player

The following players have won The Best FIFA Women's Player award while playing for Orlando Pride:

- (Brazil) Marta – 2018

FIFPro Women's World 11

The following players were named to the FIFPro Women's World 11 while playing for Orlando Pride:

- (United States) Alex Morgan (4) – 2016, 2017, 2019, 2021
- (Brazil) Marta (3) – 2017, 2019, 2021

== Internationals ==
=== Caps ===
Below is a list of players capped internationally while with Orlando Pride and the number of caps they earned during that time. A total of 33 players have represented 12 different senior national teams during their Orlando Pride tenure.

Note: Countries indicate national team as defined under FIFA eligibility rules. Players may hold more than one non-FIFA nationality.

Debuted while with Orlando

Player	Nation	Years	Caps
Mônica	Brazil	2016–2018	37
Alex Morgan	United States	2016–2021	88
Josée Bélanger	Canada	2016	17
Steph Catley	Australia	2016–2017	21
Laura Alleway	Australia	2016–2017	7
Ashlyn Harris	United States	2016–2021	17
Ali Krieger	United States	2017–2021	13
Lisa De Vanna	Australia	2016	3
Alanna Kennedy	Australia	2017–2020	39
Camila	Brazil	2017–2020	12
**Marta**	Brazil	2017–present	82
Emily van Egmond	Australia	2018–2021	34
Shelina Zadorsky	Canada	2018–2020	32
Poliana	Brazil	2018	5
Chioma Ubogagu	England	2017–2019	3
Claire Emslie	Scotland	2019–2020	9
Jordyn Listro	Canada	2020–2021; 2022–2023	2
Gunnhildur Jónsdóttir	Iceland	2021–2022	20
Konya Plummer	Jamaica	2020–2021	2
Ali Riley	New Zealand	2020–2021	6
Erin McLeod	Canada	2021–2022	1
Angharad James	Wales	2022	6
Haley Bugeja	Malta	2022–2023	5
Adriana	Brazil	2023–2025	26
Mariana Larroquette	Argentina	2023–2025	9
**Rafaelle Souza**	Brazil	2023–present	17
**Barbra Banda**	Zambia	2024–present	18
**Angelina**	Brazil	2024–present	24
**Grace Chanda**	Zambia	2024–present	10
Emily Sams	United States	2023–2025	7
**Anna Moorhouse**	England	2022–present	2
**Kerry Abello**	United States	2022–present	1
**Zara Chavoshi**	Canada	2025–present	2
**Luana**	Brazil	2025–present	1
**Lizbeth Ovalle**	Mexico	2025–present	5
**Solai Washington**	Jamaica	2026–present	1

As of April 22, 2026

Bolded players are currently on the Orlando Pride roster.

=== Honors ===
Below is a list of major international honors won by players while with Orlando Pride.

FIFA Women's World Cup

The following players have won the FIFA Women's World Cup while playing for Orlando Pride:

- (United States) Ashlyn Harris – 2019
- (United States) Ali Krieger – 2019
- (United States) Alex Morgan – 2019

Olympic Games

The following players have won the Olympic gold medal while playing for Orlando Pride:

- (Canada) Erin McLeod – 2020
- (United States) Emily Sams – 2024

== NWSL Draft picks ==
Below is a list of players Orlando Pride has selected in an NWSL Draft (formerly NWSL College Draft). A total of 32 players were drafted by Orlando prior to the draft's termination before the 2025 season.

All-time Orlando Pride NWSL Draft picks
Draft	Round	Selection	Player	Position	College team
2016	1	10	(United States) Samantha Witteman	DF	California Golden Bears
2016	2	15	(Mexico) Christina Burkenroad	FW	(California) Cal State Fullerton Titans
2016	4	31	(United States) Dani Weatherholt	MF	(California) Santa Clara Broncos
2017	3	22	(United States) Danica Evans	FW	Colorado Buffaloes
2017	4	32	(Puerto Rico) Nickolette Driesse	MF	(Pennsylvania) Penn State Nittany Lions
2018	3	23	(Portugal) Nadia Gomes	FW	(Utah) BYU Cougars
2019	3	25	(United States) Erin Greening	DF	Colorado Buffaloes
2019	4	30	(United States) Marisa Viggiano	MF	(Illinois) Northwestern Wildcats
2020	1	3	(United States) Taylor Kornieck	MF	Colorado Buffaloes
2020	1	7	(United States) Courtney Petersen	DF	Virginia Cavaliers
2020	2	10	(Jamaica) Konya Plummer	DF	(Florida) UCF Knights
2020	2	14	(United States) Phoebe McClernon	DF	Virginia Cavaliers
2020	3	21	(United States) Cheyenne Shorts	DF	(Colorado) Denver Pioneers
2020	3	26	(Ghana) Abi Kim	FW	California Golden Bears
2020	4	30	(United States) Chelsee Washington	MF	(Ohio) Bowling Green Falcons
2021	1	9	(United States) **Viviana Villacorta**	MF	(California) UCLA Bruins
2021	2	14	(United States) Mikayla Cluff	MF	(Utah) BYU Cougars
2021	3	24	(United States) **Kerry Abello**	FW	(Pennsylvania) Penn State Nittany Lions
2021	4	34	(United States) Kaylie Collins	GK	(California) USC Trojans
2022	1	5	(United States) Mia Fishel	FW	(California) UCLA Bruins
2022	1	10	(United States) Caitlin Cosme	DF	(North Carolina) Duke Blue Devils
2022	1	11	(United States) **Julie Doyle**	FW	(California) Santa Clara Broncos
2022	3	31	(United States) Jada Talley	FW	(California) USC Trojans
2023	1	3	(United States) **Emily Sams**	DF	Florida State Seminoles
2023	2	21	(United States) Messiah Bright	FW	(Texas) TCU Horned Frogs
2023	3	25	(United States) Tori Hansen	DF	North Carolina Tar Heels
2023	4	39	(United States) **Summer Yates**	MF	(Washington (state)) Washington Huskies
2023	4	41	(United States) Kristen Scott	FW	(Florida) UCF Knights
2024	1	9	(United States) **Ally Lemos**	MF	(California) UCLA Bruins
2024	2	22	(United States) **Cori Dyke**	MF	(Pennsylvania) Penn State Nittany Lions
2024	4	50	(United States) Alex Kerr	FW	Texas Tech Red Raiders
2024	4	56	(United States) Talia Gabarra	MF	(Florida) UCF Knights

Bolded players are currently on the Orlando Pride roster.

== Record by opponent ==
=== National Women's Soccer League ===
==== Regular season ====
Team no longer exists

Orlando Pride league record by opponent
Opponent	P	W	D	L	P	W	D	L	P	W	D	L	GF	GA	Win%	First
Opponent	Home				Away				Total						Win%	First
Angel City FC	5	2	2	1	5	3	0	2		5	2	4	14	11	50.00	May 8, 2022
Bay FC	3	2	1	0	3	3	0	0	6	5	1	0	10	3	83.33	May 11, 2024
Boston Breakers	3	3	0	0	2	1	0	1	5	4	0	1	10	5	80.00	July 10, 2016
Boston Legacy FC	1	0	0	1	1	0	0	1	2	0	0	2	1	3	0.00	May 11, 2026
Chicago Red Stars	12	3	2	7	12	6	0	6	24	9	2	13	37	31	37.50	May 1, 2016
Denver Summit	1	0	1	0	1	0	0	1	2	0	1	1	2	4	0.00	March 20, 2026
FC Kansas City	2	1	0	1	3	1	1	1	5	2	1	2	8	7	40.00	May 28, 2016
Gotham FC	12	4	3	5	12	5	4	3	24	9	7	8	31	29	37.50	September 7, 2016
Houston Dash	12	8	1	3	11	3	2	6	23	11	3	9	29	31	47.83	April 23, 2016
Kansas City Current	6	2	2	2	6	2	3	1	12	4	5	3	16	12	33.33	May 30, 2021
North Carolina Courage	10	4	0	6	12	3	3	6	22	7	3	12	24	50	31.82	April 29, 2017
Portland Thorns	12	4	2	6	11	1	0	10	23	5	2	16	21	47	21.74	April 17, 2016
Racing Louisville	7	3	3	1	6	0	1	5	13	3	4	6	17	23	23.08	July 9, 2021
San Diego Wave FC	5	2	1	2	5	4	1	0	10	6	2	2	15	10	60.00	August 13, 2022
Seattle Reign	11	3	5	3	10	2	3	5	21	5	8	8	23	33	23.81	May 8, 2016
Utah Royals	6	1	2	3	6	3	1	2	12	4	3	5	15	12	33.33	March 24, 2018
Washington Spirit	12	5	3	4	12	5	3	4	24	10	6	8	36	34	41.67	June 18, 2016
Western New York Flash	1	1	0	0	1	0	0	1	2	1	0	1	1	1	50.00	May 14, 2016
Total	1115	46	27	42	116	41	20	55	231	87	47	97	294	327	37.66	

==== Playoffs ====
Orlando Pride's first playoff appearance was in 2017 after the team had finished the regular season in third-place. The most recent was in 2024, having ended a five-season drought. 2024 also marked the team's first Championship game appearance.

Orlando Pride playoff record by opponent
Opponent	P	W	D	L	P	W	D	L	P	W	D	L	P	W	D	L	GF	GA	Win%	First
Opponent	Home				Away				Neutral				Total						Win%	First
Chicago Red Stars	1	1	0	0	0	0	0	0	0	0	0	0	1	1	0	0	4	1	100.00	November 8, 2024
Gotham FC	1	0	0	1	0	0	0	0	1	0	0	1	1	0	0	1	0	1	0.00	November 16, 2025
Kansas City Current	1	1	0	0	0	0	0	0	0	0	0	0	1	1	0	0	3	2	100.00	November 17, 2024
Portland Thorns	0	0	0	0	1	0	0	1	0	0	0	0	1	0	0	1	1	4	0.00	October 7, 2017
Seattle Reign FC	1	1	0	0	0	0	0	0	1	1	0	0	1	1	0	0	2	0	100.00	November 7, 2025
Washington Spirit	0	0	0	0	0	0	0	0	1	1	0	0	1	1	0	0	1	0	100.00	November 23, 2024
Total	4	3	0	1	1	0	0	1	1	1	0	0	6	4	0	2	11	8	66.67	

=== CONCACAF W Champions Cup ===
As the 2025 NWSL Champions, Orlando qualified for 2025–26 CONCACAF W Champions Cup.

Orlando Pride cup record by opponent
Opponent	P	W	D	L	P	W	D	L	P	W	D	L	GF	GA	Win%	First
Opponent	Home				Away				Total						Win%	First
(Costa Rica) Alajuelense	1	1	0	0	0	0	0	0	1	1	0	0	3	0	100.00	September 2, 2025
(Mexico) América	0	0	0	0	1	0	0	1	1	0	0	1	0	2	0.00	September 30, 2025
(Panama) FC Chorrillo	0	0	0	0	1	1	0	0	1	1	0	0	5	0	100.00	September 16, 2025
(Mexico) Pachuca	1	0	1	0	0	0	0	0	1	0	1	0	1	1	0.00	October 15, 2025
Total	2	1	1	0	2	1	0	1	4	2	1	1	9	3	50	

=== Summer Cup ===
In 2024, NWSL and Liga MX Femenil combined for a new tournament, the NWSL x Liga MX Femenil Summer Cup. All 14 NWSL clubs and six Liga MX club entered a group stage before a knockout round.

Orlando Pride cup record by opponent
Opponent	P	W	D	L	P	W	D	L	P	W	D	L	GF	GA	Win%	First
Opponent	Home				Away				Total						Win%	First
(Mexico) Monterrey	1	0	1	0	0	0	0	0	1	0	1	0	2	2	0.00	July 27, 2024
(United States) North Carolina Courage	0	0	0	0	1	0	1	0	1	0	1	0	1	1	0.00	July 20, 2024
(United States) Racing Louisville	1	0	1	0	0	0	0	0	1	0	1	0	1	1	0.00	August 1, 2024
Total	2	0	2	0	1	0	1	0	3	0	3	0	4	4	0	

=== NWSL Challenge Cup ===
The NWSL Challenge Cup was first held in 2020 as a single-site replacement tournament to the regular season schedule in response to the difficulties posed by the COVID-19 pandemic to playing a full season. Orlando Pride withdrew from the tournament after multiple positive cases in the squad prior to the start of the tournament. They first contested the Challenge Cup in 2021. Ahead of the 2024 season, the competition moved from a league cup format to a single-game super cup. As the 2024 NWSL Champions, Orlando qualified for the 2025 NWSL Challenge Cup.

Orlando Pride cup record by opponent
Opponent	P	W	D	L	P	W	D	L	P	W	D	L	GF	GA	Win%	First
Opponent	Home				Away				Total						Win%	First
Gotham FC	3	0	0	3	2	0	2	0	5	0	2	3	3	7	0.00	April 14, 2021
North Carolina Courage	2	0	1	1	3	0	1	2	5	0	2	3	3	11	0.00	May 1, 2021
Racing Louisville	0	0	0	0	1	0	1	0	1	0	1	0	2	2	0.00	April 10, 2021
Washington Spirit	4	1	2	1	2	0	0	2	6	1	2	3	5	10	16.67	April 21, 2021
Total	9	1	3	5	8	0	4	4	17	1	7	9	13	30	5.88	

=== Other ===
==== 2020 Fall Series ====
To compensate for the lack of competitive schedule and difficulty of travel during the COVID-19 pandemic, the NWSL grouped the nine teams into three regional pods of three to allow for a Fall Series in September and October. Within each pod, the teams played a four-game, home-and-away schedule with the overall winner awarded the Community Shield. Orlando were grouped in the south region with reigning NWSL champions North Carolina and 2020 NWSL Challenge Cup winners Houston. The results of those games are listed below:

September 19	North Carolina Courage	0–0	Orlando Pride	Cary, North Carolina
1:00pm		Report		Stadium: WakeMed Soccer Park; Attendance: Behind-closed-doors; Referee: Kevin Broadley

September 26	Houston Dash	3–1	Orlando Pride	Houston, Texas
8:30pm	Prince 27'; Schmidt 55' (pen.); Groom 72'	Report	Viggiano 45+3'	Stadium: BBVA Stadium; Referee: Alyssa Nichols

October 9	Orlando Pride	1–2	Houston Dash	Kissimmee, Florida
5:00pm	Leroux 47'	Report	Groom 13'; Latsko 29'	Stadium: Osceola County Stadium; Attendance: Behind-closed-doors; Referee: Alex Billeter

October 17	Orlando Pride	3–3	North Carolina Courage	Orlando, Florida
4:00pm	Viggiano 54'; Edmonds 71'; Haran 90+2'	Report	Debinha 19', 45+6'; L. Williams 45+5'	Stadium: Exploria Stadium; Attendance: Behind-closed-doors; Referee: Natalie Simon
