= 2017 Orlando Pride season =

Orlando Pride
2017 season
- Owner: Flavio Augusto da Silva; Phil Rawlins
- Head coach: Tom Sermanni
- Stadium: Orlando City Stadium; Orlando, Florida
- NWSL: 3rd of 10
- Playoffs: Semi-finals
- Top goalscorer: Marta (13)
- Highest home attendance: 14,452 (April 22 vs. Washington)
- Lowest home attendance: 4,273 (August 8 vs. Washington)
- Average home league attendance: 6,186
| Home colors | Away colors |

The 2017 season was Orlando Pride's second season. The team competed in the National Women's Soccer League, the top division of women's soccer in the United States.

== Squad information ==
=== Roster ===
As of July 3, 2017

| No. | Position | Nation | Player |
|---|---|---|---|
| 3 | DF | USA | Toni Pressley |
| 4 | MF | USA | Jamia Fields |
| 6 | FW | USA | Chioma Ubogagu |
| 7 | DF | AUS | Steph Catley |
| 8 | FW | USA | Danica Evans |
| 9 | MF | BRA | Camila |
| 10 | FW | BRA | Marta |
| 11 | DF | USA | Ali Krieger |
| 12 | MF | USA | Kristen Edmonds |
| 13 | FW | USA | Alex Morgan |
| 14 | DF | AUS | Alanna Kennedy |
| 15 | FW | USA | Rachel Hill |
| 16 | DF | USA | McKenzie Berryhill |
| 17 | MF | USA | Dani Weatherholt |
| 19 | GK | USA | Aubrey Bledsoe |
| 20 | MF | PUR | Nickolette Driesse |
| 21 | DF | BRA | Mônica |
| 23 | FW | USA | Jasmyne Spencer |
| 24 | GK | USA | Ashlyn Harris |

== Transactions ==
=== 2017 NWSL College Draft ===
Draft picks are not automatically signed to the team roster. The 2017 college draft was held on January 12, 2017. Orlando had two selections.

| Round | Pick | Player | Pos. | College | Status |
|---|---|---|---|---|---|
| 3 | 22 | (United States) Danica Evans | FW | University of Colorado | Signed |
| 4 | 32 | (Puerto Rico) Nickolette Driesse | MF | (Pennsylvania) Penn State University | Signed |

=== In ===
| Date | Player | Pos. | Previous club | Fee/notes | Ref. |
|---|---|---|---|---|---|
| November 2, 2016 | (United States) Ali Krieger | DF | (United States) Washington Spirit | Traded second-overall spot in the Distribution Ranking Order to Washington | |
| January 19, 2017 | (Australia) Alanna Kennedy | DF | (United States) Western New York Flash | Trade for midfielder Sam Witteman | |
| January 23, 2017 | (United States) Chioma Ubogagu | FW | (United States) Houston Dash | Trade for Orlando’s natural third-round pick in the 2018 NWSL College Draft | |
| April 15, 2017 | (Brazil) Marta | FW | (Sweden) FC Rosengård | | |
| May 20, 2017 | (United States) Rachel Hill | FW | (United States) UConn | Signed after college graduation. | |
| May 20, 2017 | (United States) Caroline Stanley | GK | (United States) Sky Blue FC | Signed off waivers as a goalkeeper replacement for injured Ashlyn Harris. | |
| June 21, 2017 | (United States) Alex Morgan | FW | (France) Olympique Lyonnais Féminin | Officially added to the active roster. | |

=== Out ===
| Date | Player | Pos. | Destination club | Fee/notes | Ref. |
|---|---|---|---|---|---|
| June 21, 2017 | (Mexico) Christina Burkenroad | FW | (Norway) IK Grand Bodø | Waived. | |
| July 3, 2017 | (Australia) Laura Alleway | DF | (Australia) Melbourne Victory | Waived. | |

=== Staff ===
Executive
| Owner and chairman | Flávio Augusto da Silva |
| Owner and president | Phil Rawlins |
| Owner | John Bonner |
| Chief executive officer | Alex Leitão |
Coaching staff
| Head coach | Tom Sermanni |
| Assistant coach | Khano Smith |
| Goalkeeping coach | Lloyd Yaxley |

== Match results ==
=== Preseason ===
| March 18, 2017 1 | Orlando Pride | 9–0 | Stetson Hatters | Sanford, Florida |
| 1:00 p.m. EST | Rodrigues 6'; Ubogagu 21'; Camila 29' (pen.); Edmonds 53' (pen.); Hagen 55' (Burkenroad); Tindell 63'; Pressley 66' (Burkenroad); Spencer 79' (Burkenroad), 84' (Levin) | Report | | Stadium: Sylvan Lake Park |

| March 25, 2017 2 | USF Bulls | 1–2 | Orlando Pride | Tampa, Florida |
| 6:00 p.m. EST | Viens 69' | Report | Ubogagu 11'; Rodrigues 90' | Stadium: Corbett Soccer Stadium |

| March 29, 2017 3 | Florida Gators | 0–3 | Orlando Pride | Gainesville, Florida |
| 4:00 p.m. EST | | Report | Burkenroad 5'; Ubogagu 12'; Edmonds 41' (pen.) | Stadium: Donald R. Dizney Stadium |

| April 1, 2017 4 | Orlando Pride | 3–0 | Florida State Seminoles | Sanford, Florida |
| 1:00 p.m. EST | Spencer 35' (Pressley); D. Evans 45+1' (Edmonds); Ubogagu 71' (Pressley) | Report | | Stadium: Sylvan Lake Park |

| April 7, 2017 5 | Orlando Pride | 3–0 | United States U-23 | Sanford, Florida |
| 2:00 p.m. EST | Edmonds 12', 25' (D. Evans); Spencer 73' (Edmonds) | Report | | Stadium: Sylvan Lake Park |

=== National Women's Soccer League ===
==== Results summary ====
| Overall | | | | | | | | Home | | | | | | Away | | | | | |
| Pld | W | D | L | GF | GA | GD | Pts | W | D | L | GF | GA | GD | W | D | L | GF | GA | GD |
|---|---|---|---|---|---|---|---|---|---|---|---|---|---|---|---|---|---|---|---|
| 24 | 11 | 7 | 6 | 45 | 31 | +14 | 40 | 6 | 4 | 2 | 24 | 10 | +14 | 5 | 3 | 4 | 21 | 21 | 0 |

Last updated: August 12, 2017.
Source: NWSLsoccer.com

==== Results ====
| April 15, 2017 1 | Portland Thorns FC | 2–0 | Orlando Pride | Portland, Oregon |
| 12:00 p.m. PDT | Nadim 32' (pen.); Sinclair 67' (Long) | Report | | Stadium: Providence Park; Attendance: 16,145; Referee: Danielle Chesky |

| April 22, 2017 2 | Orlando Pride | 1–1 | Washington Spirit | Orlando, Florida |
| 4 p.m. | Alleway (yellow card) 59'; Evans 86' (Ubogagu) | Report | Jensen 60'; Kallman (yellow card) 65'; Huster (yellow card) 75' | Stadium: Orlando City Stadium; Attendance: 14,452; Referee: Karen Abt |

| April 29, 2017 3 | North Carolina Courage | 3–1 | Orlando Pride | Cary, North Carolina |
| 4 p.m. | McDonald 6'; Mewis (yellow card) 18' (goal) 33' (pen.); Williams 70' (Debinha); McCall Zerboni (yellow card) 82'; Witteman (yellow card) 84' | Report | Camila 27'; Alleway (yellow card) 33' | Stadium: Sahlen’s Stadium at WakeMed Soccer Park; Attendance: 4,586; Referee: Farhad Dadkho |

| May 7, 2017 4 | FC Kansas City | 1–1 | Orlando Pride | Kansas City, Missouri |
| 5 p.m. CDT | Leroux (yellow card) 45+1'; Tymrak 84' (Kelly) | Report | Evans (yellow card) 60'; Marta 73' (Spencer) | Stadium: Children's Mercy Victory Field; Attendance: 2,514; Referee: Marco Vega |

| May 14, 2017 5 | Orlando Pride | 3–1 | North Carolina Courage | Orlando, Florida |
| 5 p.m. | Ubogagu 49' (Krieger); Camila 50' (Fields); Spencer 82' (Marta); Krieger (yellow card) 88'; Toni Pressley (yellow card) 90' | Report | Zerboni (yellow card) 10'; Erceg (yellow card) 44' (yellow-red card) 57'; Debinha 51' (Williams) | Stadium: Orlando City Stadium; Attendance: 5,260; Referee: Jon Freemon |

| May 21, 2017 6 | Seattle Reign FC | 1–1 | Orlando Pride | Seattle, Washington |
| 6:30 p.m. PDT | Yanez 40' (Corsie); Barnes (yellow card) 49'; Rapinoe (yellow card) 50' | Report | Marta 52' (Camila) (yellow card) 90+4'; Camila (yellow card) 83' | Stadium: Memorial Stadium; Attendance: 4,037; Referee: Timothy Ford |

| May 27, 2017 7 | Sky Blue FC | 2–1 | Orlando Pride | Piscataway, New Jersey |
| 7 p.m. | Kerr 43' (Corboz); Hayes 82' (Kerr) | Report | Spencer 18' | Stadium: Yurcak Field; Attendance: 3,452; Referee: Robi Hullner |

| June 3, 2017 8 | Orlando Pride | 2–0 | Boston Breakers | Orlando, Florida |
| 7:30 p.m. | Marta 9' (pen.); Spencer 13' (Camila); Kennedy (yellow card) 26'; Camila (yellow card) 49' | Report | Smith (yellow card) 8'; Elby (yellow card) 55'; White (yellow card) 57'; Dowie (yellow card) 85' | Stadium: Orlando City Stadium; Attendance: 5,185; Referee: Karen Abt |

| June 17, 2017 9 | Houston Dash | 2–4 | Orlando Pride | Houston, Texas |
| 5:00 pm | Beckie (yellow card) 64'; Van Wyk (yellow card) 80'; Poliana 89' (Andressinha); Prince 90+6' (Andressinha) | Report | Camila 16' (Marta) (yellow card) 65'; Marta 22', 57' (Spencer); Kennedy 68' (Marta) | Stadium: BBVA Compass Stadium; Attendance: 5,918; Referee: Rebecca Pagan |

| June 24, 2017 10 | Orlando Pride | 0–2 | Houston Dash | Orlando, Florida |
| 3:50 pm | | Report | Van Wyk (yellow card) 43'; Lloyd 45+4' (Poliana); Daly 62' (Poliana) | Stadium: Orlando City Stadium; Attendance: 5,497; Referee: Marco Vega |

| June 28, 2017 11 | Sky Blue FC | 2–3 | Orlando Pride | Piscataway, New Jersey |
| 7:00 pm | O'Hara 45' (pen.); Kerr 46' (Hayes); Stanton (yellow card) 90+4' | Report | Ubogagu 11'; Spencer (yellow card) 75'; Marta 77'; Hill 86' (Catley) | Stadium: Yurcak Field; Attendance: 3,065; Referee: Danielle Chesky |

| July 1, 2017 12 | Orlando Pride | 0–1 | Chicago Red Stars | Orlando, Florida |
| 6:00 pm | Krieger (yellow card) 52' | Report | Press 68' (pen.) | Stadium: Orlando City Stadium; Attendance: 5,476; Referee: Guido Gonzales Jr. |
Note: Kickoff was delayed by 1 hour due to rain.

| July 8, 2017 13 | Washington Spirit | 2–2 | Orlando Pride | Baltimore, Maryland |
| 4:00 pm | Pugh 24' (Ordega), 90' (pen.) | Report | Marta 10' (pen.), 56' | Stadium: Maryland SoccerPlex; Attendance: 5,200; Referee: Henrik Karlsson |

| July 15, 2017 14 | Orlando Pride | 4–1 | FC Kansas City | Orlando, Florida |
| 7:30 pm | Kennedy 22' (Marta); Morgan 38' (pen.); Weatherholt (yellow card) 45'; Pressley 70' (Camila); Edmonds 75' | Report | Kelly 65' (Bowen); Gibbons (yellow card) 88' | Stadium: Orlando City Stadium; Attendance: 6,073; Referee: Greg Dopka |

| July 22, 2017 15 | Chicago Red Stars | 2–1 | Orlando Pride | Bridgeview, Illinois |
| 4:00 pm | Press 29' (Huerta), 52' (Hoy) | Report | Marta (yellow card) 76'; Kennedy 90+3' (Hill) | Stadium: Toyota Park; Attendance: 4,742; Referee: Farhad Dadkho |

| August 5, 2017 16 | Orlando Pride | 1–1 | Chicago Red Stars | Orlando, Florida |
| 7:30 pm | Morgan 24' (Spencer); Kennedy (yellow card) 69' | Report | Johnson (yellow card) 51'; Huerta 53' (Hoy) | Stadium: Orlando City Stadium; Attendance: 5,667; Referee: Ekaterina Koroleva |

| August 8, 2017 17 | Orlando Pride | 3–0 | Washington Spirit | Orlando, Florida |
| 7:30 pm | Evans (yellow card) 49'; Marta 52' (Morgan); Camila 57'; Ubogagu (yellow card) 62'; Morgan 64' (Catley) | Report | | Stadium: Orlando City Stadium; Attendance: 4,273; Referee: Christina Unkel |

| August 12, 2017 18 | Orlando Pride | 5–0 | Sky Blue FC | Orlando, Florida |
| 4:00 pm | Morgan 4' (Marta), 47' (Spencer); Weatherholt 43' (Camila); Marta 53', 58' (Morgan) | Report | | Stadium: Orlando City Stadium; Attendance: 5,243; Referee: Elvis Osmanovic |

| August 19, 2017 19 | Boston Breakers | 1–2 | Orlando Pride | Boston, Massachusetts |
| 4:00 pm | Stengel (yellow card) 52'; Andrews (yellow card) 71'; White (yellow card) 90+5'; Da Costa 90+8' (pen.) | Report | Morgan 8', 73' (Krieger); Kennedy (yellow card) 24'; Catley (yellow card) 58' | Stadium: Jordan Field; Attendance: 4,321; Referee: Gustavo Solorio |

| August 26, 2017 20 | FC Kansas City | 1–2 | Orlando Pride | Kansas City, Missouri |
| 4:00 pm | LaBonta 42' (Groom) | Report | Ubogagu 16'; Camila (yellow card) 45'; Morgan 87' (Marta) | Stadium: Swope Soccer Village; Attendance: 2,812; Referee: Danielle Chesky |

| September 2, 2017 21 | Orlando Pride | 4–2 | Boston Breakers | Orlando, Florida |
| 4:00 pm | Hill 8', 15' (Morgan); Marta 67' (Ubogagu); Ubogagu 77' | Report | White 49' (Frisbie); Elby (yellow card) 63'; King 88' (Leon) | Stadium: Orlando City Stadium; Attendance: 5,413; Referee: Kevin Broadley |

| September 7, 2017 22 | Orlando Pride | 1–1 | Seattle Reign FC | Orlando, Florida |
| 8:00 pm | Morgan 90+2' (Weatherholt) | Report | Pickett (yellow card) 37'; Mathias (yellow card) 57'; Barnes (yellow card) 90+1'; Fishlock 90+4' (Kawasumi) | Stadium: Orlando City Stadium; Attendance: 4,341; Referee: Daniel Gutierrez |
Note: Rescheduled from Saturday, September 9th in anticipation of hazardous conditions due to Hurricane Irma

| September 23, 2017 23 | Orlando Pride | 0–0 | Portland Thorns FC | Orlando, Florida |
| 5:00 pm | Kristen Edmonds (yellow card) 69' | Report | Allie Long (yellow card) 18' | Stadium: Orlando City Stadium; Attendance: 7,353; Referee: Chris Spivey |

| September 30, 2017 24 | North Carolina Courage | 2–3 | Orlando Pride | Cary, North Carolina |
| 7:30 pm | Williams 62', 67' (pen.); Dahlkemper (yellow card) 90' | Report | Edmonds 22'; Marta 52' (yellow card) 72'; Harris (yellow card) 66'; Kennedy 90+1' | Stadium: WakeMed Soccer Park; Attendance: 7,020 |

==== League standings ====
| Pos | Team | Pld | W | D | L | GF | GA | GD | Pts | Qualification |
|---|---|---|---|---|---|---|---|---|---|---|
| 1 | North Carolina Courage | 24 | 16 | 1 | 7 | 38 | 22 | +16 | 49 | NWSL Shield |
| 2 | Portland Thorns FC (C) | 24 | 14 | 5 | 5 | 37 | 20 | +17 | 47 | NWSL Playoffs |
| 3 | Orlando Pride | 24 | 11 | 7 | 6 | 45 | 31 | +14 | 40 | NWSL Playoffs |
| 4 | Chicago Red Stars | 24 | 11 | 6 | 7 | 33 | 30 | +3 | 39 | NWSL Playoffs |
| 5 | Seattle Reign FC | 24 | 9 | 7 | 8 | 43 | 37 | +6 | 34 | |
| 6 | Sky Blue FC | 24 | 10 | 3 | 11 | 42 | 51 | −9 | 33 | |
| 7 | FC Kansas City | 24 | 8 | 7 | 9 | 29 | 31 | −2 | 31 | |
| 8 | Houston Dash | 24 | 7 | 3 | 14 | 23 | 39 | −16 | 24 | |
| 9 | Boston Breakers | 24 | 4 | 7 | 13 | 24 | 35 | −11 | 19 | |
| 10 | Washington Spirit | 24 | 5 | 4 | 15 | 30 | 48 | −18 | 19 | |

Source: NWSL
Rules for classification: Tiebreakers
(C) Champions

== NWSL Playoffs ==
The top four teams from the regular season will compete for the NWSL Championship. Final seeding to be determined by 10:30 pm EST Saturday, Sept. 30th.

Semi-finals
2 | Portland Thorns FC | 4
3 | Orlando Pride | 1
1 | North Carolina Courage | 1
4 | Chicago Red Stars | 0

Championship
2 | Portland Thorns FC | 1
1 | North Carolina Courage | 0

=== Semi-finals ===
October 7, 2017
12:30pm (PDT)

| Portland Thorns FC | 4 - 1 | Orlando Pride |
|---|---|---|
| Henry 12' (yellow card) 80'; Sonnett 15'; Raso 71'; Sinclair 82' | Report | Kennedy 23' |

Providence Park
Portland, Oregon
Attendance: 18,193

== Media ==
The NWSLsoccer.com website and the Go90 app have the exclusive rights to streaming all games live on each of their platforms. In addition, the league has partnered with the Lifetime Network to air a "Game of the Week" on Saturdays for the 24-week Regular Season. The Pride were selected for 7 matches on the slate. The dates are:

Sat., Apr. 15 / 3 p.m. kickoff / Portland Thorns FC vs. Orlando Pride

Sat., Apr. 22 / 4 p.m. kickoff / Orlando Pride vs. Washington Spirit

Sat., June 24 / 3:30 p.m. kickoff** / Orlando Pride vs. Houston Dash

Sat., July 22 / 3:30 p.m. kickoff** / Chicago Red Stars vs. Orlando Pride

Sat., Aug. 12 / 7:30 p.m. kickoff** / Orlando Pride vs. Sky Blue FC

Sat., Sept. 2 / 3:30 p.m. kickoff**/ Orlando Pride vs. Boston Breakers

Sat., Sept. 9 / 3:30 p.m. kickoff** / Orlando Pride vs. Seattle Reign FC

The NWSL announced on August 17 that the Game of the Week on Lifetime for Saturday, Sept. 23 at 3:30 p.m. ET featured the Orlando Pride vs. Portland Thorns FC at Orlando City Stadium. Lifetime also aired their away match at FC Kansas City on August 26.

** New schedule adjustments issued on June 12 by the NWSL and Lifetime Network airtimes revised for player safety due to extreme temperatures and allowance for hydration breaks.

== Honors and awards ==
=== NWSL Awards ===
==== NWSL Team of the Year ====
| Team | Position | Player | Ref. |
|---|---|---|---|
| Best XI | Defender | (United States) Ali Krieger | |
| Best XI | Forward | (Brazil) Marta | |
| Second X1 | Defender | (Australia) Steph Catley | |
| Second X1 | Forward | (United States) Alex Morgan | |

=== NWSL Monthly Award ===
==== NWSL Player of the Month ====
| Month | Player | Month's Statline | Ref. |
|---|---|---|---|
| August | (United States) Alex Morgan | 7 Goals; 2 Assist; 13 Shots on Goal; 11 Chances Created | |
| September | (Brazil) Marta | 2 Goals; 13 Chances Created; 85% Passing Accuracy | |

==== NWSL Team of the Month ====
| Month | Goalkeeper | Defenders | Midfielders | Forwards | Ref. |
|---|---|---|---|---|---|
| June | | (United States) Ali Krieger | (Brazil) Marta | | |
| July | | | (Brazil) Marta | | |
| August | | (United States) Ali Krieger (Australia) Steph Catley | (Brazil) Marta | (United States) Alex Morgan** | |
| September | | | (Brazil) Marta (Australia) Alanna Kennedy | | |

=== NWSL Weekly Awards ===
==== NWSL Goal of the Week ====
| Week | Result | Player | Ref. |
|---|---|---|---|
| 2 | Won | (United States) Danica Evans | |
| 3 | Won | (Brazil) Camila | |
| 9 | Won | (Brazil) Camila | |
| 13 | Won | (United States) Toni Pressley | |
| 16 | Won | (Brazil) Marta | |
| 18 | Won | (United States) Alex Morgan | |
| 22 | Won | (Australia) Alanna Kennedy | |

==== NWSL Save of the Week ====
| Week | Result | Player | Ref. |
|---|---|---|---|
| 1 | Won | (United States) Ashlyn Harris | |
| 2 | Won | (Brazil) Monica | |
| 4 | Won | (United States) Ashlyn Harris | |
| 9 | Won | (United States) Aubrey Bledsoe | |
| 10 | Won | (Australia) Steph Catley | |
| 12 | Won | (United States) Aubrey Bledsoe | |
| 13 | Won | (United States) Aubrey Bledsoe | |
| 17 | Won | (United States) Ashlyn Harris | |
| 18 | Won | (United States) Ashlyn Harris | |
| 22 | Won | (United States) Ashlyn Harris | |

=== Other awards ===
Orlando Pride forward Marta and defender Ali Krieger have been named to the 2017 National Women’s Soccer League (NWSL) Best XI, announced on October 12.
