= 2018 Orlando Pride season =

Orlando Pride
2018 season
- CEO: Alex Leitão
- Head coach: Tom Sermanni
- Stadium: Orlando City Stadium; Orlando, Florida
- NWSL: 7th of 9
- Playoffs: Did not qualify
- Top goalscorer: Sydney Leroux (6)
- Highest home attendance: 9.017 (March 24th vs. Utah Royals FC)
- Lowest home attendance: 3,104 (May 23rd vs. North Carolina Courage)
- Average home league attendance: 4,837
Home colors	Away colors

The 2018 season was Orlando Pride's third season in the National Women's Soccer League, the top division of women's soccer in the United States. The team played its home games at Orlando City Stadium.

== Roster ==
As of March 7, 2018

No.	Position	Nation	Player
2	FW	USA	Sydney Leroux
3	DF	USA	Toni Pressley
4	DF	CAN	Shelina Zadorsky
5	MF	AUS	Emily Van Egmond
6	FW	ENG	Chioma Ubogagu
7	MF	USA	Christine Nairn
8	FW	USA	Danica Evans
9	MF	BRA	Camila
10	FW	BRA	Marta
11	DF	USA	Ali Krieger
12	MF	USA	Kristen Edmonds
13	FW	USA	Alex Morgan
14	DF	AUS	Alanna Kennedy
15	FW	USA	Rachel Hill
16	DF	USA	Carson Pickett
17	MF	USA	Dani Weatherholt
19	DF	BRA	Poliana
21	DF	BRA	Mônica
24	GK	USA	Ashlyn Harris
28	GK	USA	Haley Kopmeyer

== Transfers and loans ==
=== 2018 NWSL College Draft ===
Draft picks are not automatically signed to the team roster. The 2018 college draft was held on January 18, 2018. Orlando had one selection.

Round	Pick	Player	Pos.	College	Status
3	23	(Portugal) Nadia Gomes	FW	(Utah) Brigham Young University	Not signed

=== In ===
Date	Player	Positions played	Previous club	Fee/notes	Ref.
January 23, 2018	(Canada) Shelina Zadorsky	DF	(United States) Washington Spirit	Acquired in trade for Aubrey Bledsoe and Orlando's natural first-round pick in the 2019 NWSL College Draft.	
January 29, 2018	(United States) Christine Nairn	MF	(United States) Seattle Reign FC	Acquired in trade for Stephanie Catley	
January 29, 2018	(United States) Carson Pickett	DF	(United States) Seattle Reign FC	Acquired in trade for Stephanie Catley	
January 29, 2018	(United States) Haley Kopmeyer	GK	(United States) Seattle Reign FC	Acquired in trade for Jasmyne Spencer	
February 2, 2018	(United States) Sydney Leroux	FW	(United States) Utah Royals FC	Acquired in trade for Orlando's first-round pick in the 2019 NWSL College Draft (which was acquired from Seattle Reign FC in separate trade).	
February 6, 2018	(Brazil) Poliana	DF	(United States) Houston Dash	Acquired in trade for Orlando's second-round pick in the 2019 NWSL College Draft.	
February 14, 2018	(Australia) Emily van Egmond	MF	(Australia) Newcastle Jets FC	Signed in off season.	
March 21, 2018	(Sweden) Lotta Ökvist	DF	(United States) Houston Dash	Acquired in trade with Houston Dash for Orlando's 3rd round draft pick in 2019.	

=== Out ===
Date	Player	Positions played	Destination club	Fee/notes	Ref.
January 29, 2018	(Australia) Steph Catley	DF	(United States) Seattle Reign FC	Traded for Christine Nairn and Carson Pickett	
January 29, 2018	(United States) Jasmyne Spencer	FW	(United States) Seattle Reign FC	Traded for Haley Kopmeyer and Reign FC's natural third-round pick in the 2019 NWSL College Draft.	
February 9, 2018	(United States) Nickolette Driesse	MF	(United States) Sky Blue FC	Waived.	
February 12, 2018	(United States) Jamia Fields	FW	(Norway) Arna-Bjørnar	Waived.	
July 3, 2018	(Sweden) Lotta Ökvist	DF	(Sweden) Hammarby IF	Waived.	

== Match results ==
=== Preseason ===
February 28	Florida State University	3–2	Orlando Pride	Tallahassee, Florida
6 PM ET	Castellanos 33' (pen.), 89' Tillman 49'	Report	Leroux 8' Carter 80'	Stadium: Seminole Soccer Complex; Attendance: 2,000

March 3	University of Central Florida	0–3	Orlando Pride	Orlando, Florida
3 PM ET		Report	Leroux 14': Leroux 21'; Nairn 33'	Stadium: UCF Track and Soccer Complex

March 8	University of South Florida	1–5	Orlando Pride	Tampa, Florida
6 PM ET	USF 73'	Report	Leroux 4'; Evans 20'; Weatherholt 45'; Ubogagu 58'; Nairn 73'	Stadium: Corbett Stadium

=== National Women's Soccer League ===
==== Results summary ====
Overall								Home						Away					
Pld	W	D	L	GF	GA	GD	Pts	W	D	L	GF	GA	GD	W	D	L	GF	GA	GD
24	8	6	10	30	37	−7	30	3	4	5	16	22	−6	5	2	5	14	15	−1

Last updated: August 25, 2018.
Source: NWSLsoccer.com

==== Results by round ====
Round	1	2	3	4	5	6	7	8	9	10	11	12	13	14	15	16	17	18	19	20	21	22	23	24
Stadium	H	A	A	H	H	A	A	A	H	A	A	H	A	H	H	H	A	A	H	H	H	A	H	A
Result	D	L	L	W	D	W	D	W	L	W	D	W	W	L	L	W	L	W	D	D	L	L	L	L
Position (Note: ORL's position at the end of the matchweek, not their match.)	6	8	8	6	6	4	5	4	6	3	3	3	2	3	3	3	3	3	4	3	4	5	6	7

Updated to match(es) played on September 8, 2018. Source: NWSLsoccer.com
A = Away; H = Home; W = Win; D = Draw; L = Loss

==== Results ====
Sat., March 24 1	Orlando Pride	1–1	Utah Royals FC	Orlando, Florida
7:30pm	Marta 21' (pen.) Krieger (yellow card) 90+3'	Report	Jónsdóttir 3' (Matheson); Sauerbrunn (yellow card) 21'; Ratcliffe (yellow card) 58'	Stadium: Orlando City Stadium; Attendance: 9,017; Referee: Danielle Chesky

Sat., March 31 2	Washington Spirit	2–0	Orlando Pride	Boyds, Maryland
3:30pm	Church (yellow card) 44'; Pugh 80' (Hatch); Hatch 88'	Report		Stadium: Maryland SoccerPlex; Attendance: 4,989
Note: Televised on Lifetime.

Sun., April 15 3	Portland Thorns	2–1	Orlando Pride	Portland, Oregon
6:00pm	Horan 28' (Sinclair); Sinclair 39' (Horan)	Report	Ubogagu 20' (Nairn); Pressley (yellow card) 85'	Stadium: Providence Park; Attendance: 16,466

Sun., April 22 4	Orlando Pride	1–0	Houston Dash	Orlando, Florida
5:00pm	Ubogagu 65' (Nairn)	Report		Stadium: Orlando City Stadium; Attendance: 3,890

Sat., April 28 5	Orlando Pride	1–1	Seattle Reign	Orlando, Florida
7:30pm	Marta 61'	Report	Long 33' (Oyster); Betos (yellow card) 89'	Stadium: Orlando City Stadium; Attendance: 5,058

Wed., May 2 6	Chicago Red Stars	0–2	Orlando Pride	Bridgeview, Illinois
7:30pm	Comeau (yellow card) 87'	Report	Ubogagu 28' (Leroux); Hill 81' (van Egmond)	Stadium: Toyota Park; Attendance: 2,027

Wed., May 9 7	Utah Royals FC	0–0	Orlando Pride	Sandy, Utah
9:00pm	Gorry (yellow card) 86'	Report		Stadium: Rio Tinto Stadium; Attendance: 7,137

Sat., May 12 8	Portland Thorns	1–2	Orlando Pride	Portland, Oregon
3:30pm	Sinclair 23' (Heath) (yellow card) 76'; Andressina (yellow card) 65'	Report	Morgan 11'; Nairn 21'; Pickett (yellow card) 64'; Weatherholt (yellow card) 83'	Stadium: Providence Park; Attendance: 17,115
Note: Televised on Lifetime.

Wed., May 23 9	Orlando Pride	3–4	North Carolina Courage	Orlando, Florida
7:30pm	Ubogagu 52' (Marta); Kennedy 65' (Nairn) van Egmond (yellow card) 72'; Hill 83' (Marta)	Report	McDonald 32' (O'Sullivan), 90' (Hinkle); Debinha 57'; Mewis 62' (Dunn); Erceg (yellow card) 90+3'	Stadium: Orlando City Stadium; Attendance: 3,104; Referee: Christina Unkel

Sat., May 26 10	Chicago Red Stars	2–5	Orlando Pride	Bridgeview, Illinois
3:30pm	Kerr 21' (Nagasato), 60' (Nagasato); Johnson (yellow card) 42'	Report	Hill 2'; Morgan 6' (Marta); Leroux 61' (Krieger), 63'; Weatherholt 83' (Morgan)	Stadium: Toyota Park; Attendance: 5,047

Sun., June 3 11	Seattle Reign	0–0	Orlando Pride	Seattle, Washington
9:00pm	Spencer (yellow card) 70'	Report	Zadorsky (yellow card) 79'	Stadium: UW Medicine Pitch at Memorial Stadium; Attendance: 5,251

Sat., June 16 12	Orlando Pride	3–2	Sky Blue FC	Orlando, Florida
7:30pm	Leroux 2' (Ubogagu), 31' (Nairn) (yellow card) 75'; Hill 83' (Morgan)	Report	McCaskill 16'; Tiernan 37'; Gibbons (yellow card) 45+1'; Lloyd (yellow card) 85'	Stadium: Orlando City Stadium; Attendance: 4,445

Sat., June 23 13	Washington Spirit	0–1	Orlando Pride	Boyds, Maryland
7pm	Dydasco (yellow card) 18'; Dougherty Howard (yellow card) 90+3'	Report	Kennedy 11'	Stadium: Maryland SoccerPlex; Attendance: 4,005
Note: Televised on ESPNews.

Wed., June 27 14	Orlando Pride	1–2	Houston Dash	Orlando, Florida
7:30pm	Morgan 22' (Zadorsky); Pickett (yellow card) 90'; Monica (yellow card) 90+1'; Nairn (yellow card) 90+1'; Leroux (yellow card) 90+3'	Report	Chapman (yellow card) 75'; Ohai 79' (Motlhalo); Huerta 83' (pen.)	Stadium: Orlando City Stadium; Attendance: 3,215

Sat., June 30 15	Orlando Pride	0–3	North Carolina Courage	Orlando, Florida
3:30pm		Report	Debinha 37'; Mathias 39' (Debinha); McDonald 40' (Dunn)	Stadium: Orlando City Stadium; Attendance: 4,017; Referee: Elvis Osmanovic
Note: Televised on Lifetime.

Sat., July 7 16	Orlando Pride	2–1	Washington Spirit	Orlando, Florida
7:30pm	Leroux 45+2' (Kennedy); Marta 86' (Leroux); Marta (yellow card) 90+3'	Report	Hatch 26' (Church)	Stadium: Orlando City Stadium; Attendance: 4,621
Note: Televised on ESPNews.

Wed., July 11 17	Houston Dash	3–1	Orlando Pride	Houston, Texas
8:30pm	Daly 17' (Ohai), 50'; Hanson (yellow card) 90+1'; Kgatlana 90+5' (Chapman)	Report	Leroux 55' (Zadorsky); Ubogagu (yellow card) 80'; Zadorsky (yellow card) 87'; Marta (red card) 90+6'	Stadium: BBVA Compass Stadium; Attendance: 3,308

Sat., July 14 18	Utah Royals FC	1–2	Orlando Pride	Sandy, Utah
7pm	Rodriguez 8' (Corsie)	Report	Hill (yellow card) 24'; Morgan 45+2' (pen.); Edmonds 52' (Krieger); Kennedy (yellow card) 68'; Ubogagu (yellow card) 75'; Camila (yellow card) 89'	Stadium: Rio Tinto Stadium; Attendance: 8,761
Note: Televised on ESPNews.

Sat., July 21 19	Orlando Pride	1–1	Seattle Reign	Orlando, Florida
3:30pm	Pressley 21'	Report	Taylor 70' (Kawasumi); Barnes (yellow card) 90+1'	Stadium: Orlando City Stadium; Attendance: 5,074
Note: Televised on Lifetime.

Sun., August 5 20	Orlando Pride	2–2	Sky Blue FC	Orlando, Florida
7:30pm	Edmonds (yellow card) 32'; Marta 51'; Weatherholt 73'; Camila (yellow card) 78'; Kennedy (yellow card) 90+3'	Report	Dorsey 53' (Groom); Groom 59' (McCaskill); Lloyd (red card) 90+6'	Stadium: Orlando City Stadium; Attendance: 4,577

Sat., August 11 21	Orlando Pride	0–2	Portland Thorns	Orlando, Florida
7:30pm	Marta (yellow card) 73'	Report	Sinclair (yellow card) 27'; Horan 47' (Heath); Raso 53' (Crnogorčević)	Stadium: Orlando City Stadium; Attendance: 6,012; Referee: Katja Koroleva

Sat., August 18 22	North Carolina Courage	3–0	Orlando Pride	Cary, North Carolina
7:00pm	Mathias (yellow card) 37'; Zadorsky 75' (o.g.); Debinha 81' (Williams); Williams 88' (Mathias)	Report	Van Egmond (yellow card) 28'	Stadium: Sahlen's Stadium at WakeMed Soccer Park; Attendance: 7,606; Referee: Kevin Broadley
Note: Game resumed in the 22nd minute on Sunday, August 19 due to weather

Sat., August 25 23	Orlando Pride	1–3	Chicago Red Stars	Orlando, Florida
3:30pm	Camila (yellow card) 42'; Zadorsky (yellow card) 79'; Monica (yellow card) 82'; Morgan 65' (Marta)	Report	Kerr 44' (Nagasato), 59'; DiBernardo 45+1' (Kerr)	Stadium: Orlando City Stadium; Attendance: 5,016; Referee: Guido Gonzales Jr

Sat., Sep 8 24	Sky Blue FC	1–0	Orlando Pride	Piscataway, New Jersey
12:00pm	Sheridan (yellow card) 32'; Lloyd 74' (Groom)	Report		Stadium: Yurcak Field at Rutgers University; Attendance: 4,086

==== League standings ====
Pos	Team	Pld	W	D	L	GF	GA	GD	Pts	
1	North Carolina Courage (C)	24	17	6	1	53	17	+36	57	NWSL Shield
2	Portland Thorns FC	24	12	6	6	40	28	+12	42	NWSL Playoffs
3	Seattle Reign FC	24	11	8	5	27	19	+8	41	NWSL Playoffs
4	Chicago Red Stars	24	9	10	5	38	28	+10	37	NWSL Playoffs
5	Utah Royals FC	24	9	8	7	22	23	−1	35	
6	Houston Dash	24	9	5	10	35	39	−4	32	
7	Orlando Pride	24	8	6	10	30	37	−7	30	
8	Washington Spirit	24	2	5	17	12	35	−23	11	
9	Sky Blue FC	24	1	6	17	21	52	−31	9	

Source: NWSL
Rules for classification: Tiebreakers
(C) Champions

== Media ==
The NWSL website and the Go90 app have the exclusive rights to streaming all games live on each of their platforms. In addition, the league has partnered with the Lifetime Network to air a "Game of the Week" on Saturdays for the 24-week Regular Season. The Pride were selected for 8 matches on the slate. The dates are:

- Sat Mar 31 / 3:50 PM ET kickoff / Washington Spirit vs Orlando Pride
- Sat May 12 / 3:50 PM ET kickoff / Portland Thorns FC vs Orlando Pride
- Sat May 26 / 3:50 PM ET kickoff / Chicago Red Stars vs Orlando Pride
- Sat Jun 23 / 3:50 PM ET kickoff / Washington Spirit vs Orlando Pride
- Sat Jun 30 / 3:50 PM ET kickoff / Orlando Pride vs North Carolina Courage
- Sat Jul 14 / 3:50 PM ET kickoff / Utah Royals FC vs Orlando Pride
- Sat Jul 21 / 3:50 PM ET kickoff / Orlando Pride vs Seattle Reign FC
- Sat Aug 25 / 3:50 PM ET kickoff / Orlando Pride vs Chicago Red Stars

== Squad statistics ==
=== Goalscorers ===
As of matches played September 8, 2018

Rank	Pos.	No.	Name	NWSL	NWSL Playoffs	Total
1	FW	2	(United States) Sydney Leroux	6	0	6
2	FW	6	(United States) Chioma Ubogagu	4	0	4
2	FW	15	(United States) Rachel Hill	4	0	4
2	FW	13	(United States) Alex Morgan	4	0	4
2	FW	10	(Brazil) Marta	4	0	4
6	DF	14	(Australia) Alanna Kennedy	2	0	2
6	DF	17	(United States) Dani Weatherholt	2	0	2
8	MF	7	(United States) Christine Nairn	1	0	1
8	MF	12	(United States) Kristen Edmonds	1	0	1
8	DF	3	(United States) Toni Pressley	1	0	1

=== Clean sheets ===
As of matches played September 8, 2018

No.	Name	NWSL	NWSL Playoffs	Total
24	(United States) Ashlyn Harris	4	0	4
Total		4	0	4

== Honors and awards ==
=== NWSL Team of the Month ===
Month	Player	Position	Ref.
May	(United States) Ali Krieger	Defender	

=== NWSL Weekly Awards ===
==== NWSL Goal of the Week ====
Week	Result	Player	Ref.
5	Nominated	(Brazil) Marta	
6	Nominated	(United States) Chioma Ubogagu	
7	Won	(United States) Christine Nairn	
9	Won	(United States) Sydney Leroux	
11/12	Nominated	(United States) Sydney Leroux	
13	Won	(Australia) Alanna Kennedy	
15	Won	(Brazil) Marta	
16	Won	(United States) Kristen Edmonds	
17	Won	(United States) Toni Pressley	

==== NWSL Save of the Week ====
Week	Result	Player	Ref.
3	Won	(United States) Ashlyn Harris	
7	Won	(United States) Ashlyn Harris	
9	Won	(United States) Ashlyn Harris	
10	Won	(United States) Haley Kopmeyer	
13	Won	(United States) Ashlyn Harris	
14	Nominated	(United States) Ashlyn Harris	
17	Nominated	(United States) Haley Kopmeyer	
21	Won	(United States) Ashlyn Harris	
22	Won	(United States) Ashlyn Harris	
