= Lotta Ökvist =

Swedish footballer

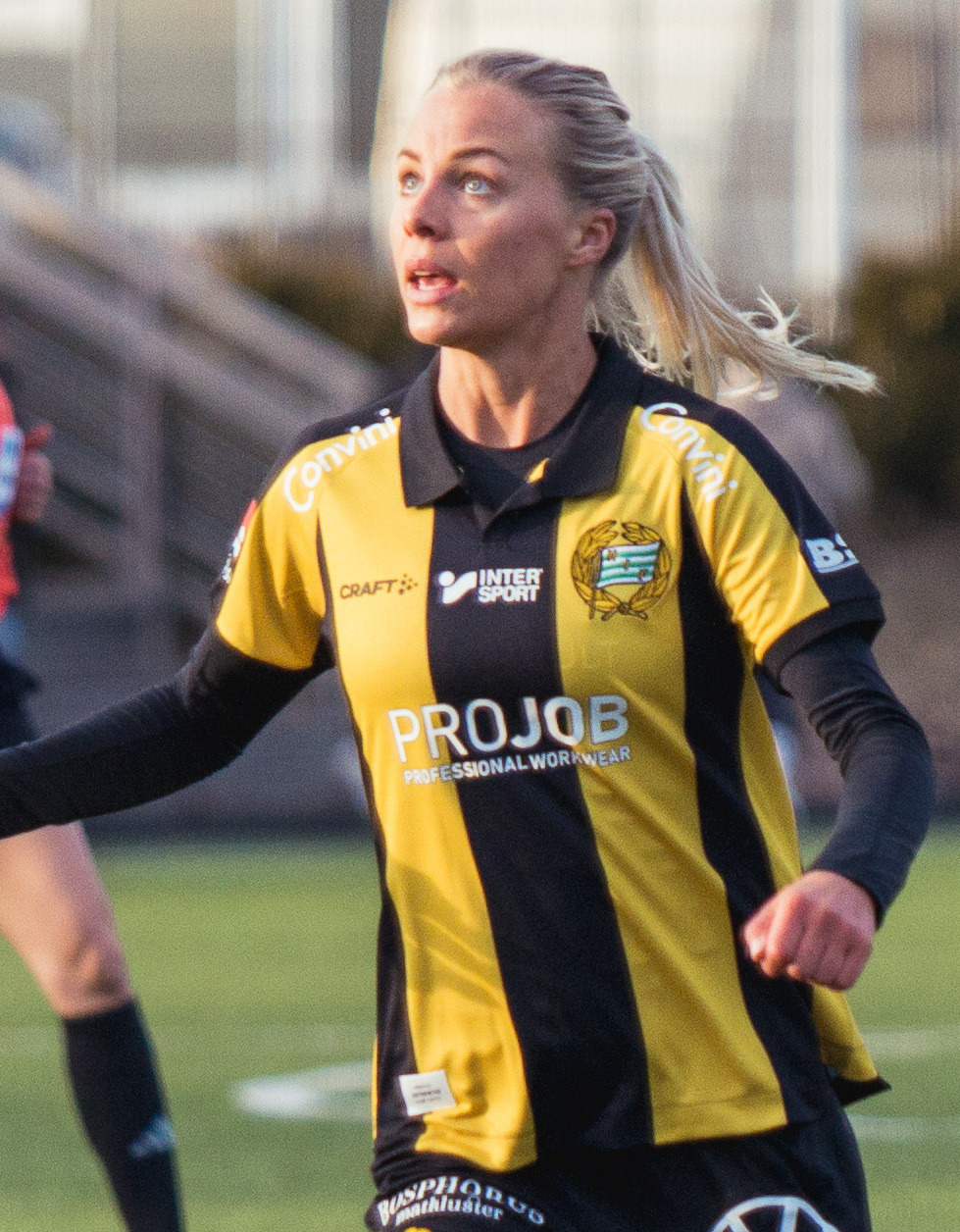
- Ökvist with Hammarby IF in 2025

Personal information
- Full name: Lotta Linnea Ökvist
- Date of birth: 17 February 1997 (age 29)
- Place of birth: Piteå, Sweden
- Height: 5 ft 5 in (1.65 m)
- Position: Full-back

Senior career*
Years	Team	Apps	(Gls)
2012–2015	Piteå IF	27	(0)
2016	Umeå IK	11	(1)
2016–2017	Piteå IF	28	(1)
2018	Orlando Pride	0	(0)
2018–2019	Hammarby IF	24	(3)
2019–2021	Manchester United	6	(0)
2021–2022	BK Häcken	36	(3)
2022	→ Eskilstuna United (loan)	5	(0)
2023–2025	Hammarby IF	21	(0)

International career^{‡}
2013	Sweden U17	12	(2)
2014–2016	Sweden U19	33	(0)
2017–2019	Sweden U23	16	(0)
2020–	Sweden	1	(0)
- * Club domestic league appearances and goals as of 9 June 2025 ‡ National team caps and goals as of 7 March 2020

Lotta Linnea Ökvist (born 17 February 1997) is a Swedish professional footballer who plays as a defender for Hammarby IF in the Damallsvenskan.

She previously played for Swedish clubs Piteå IF, Umeå IK, BK Häcken and Eskilstuna United, and Manchester United in the FA WSL. In 2020, she won her first cap for the Sweden national team.

== Club career ==
=== Move to the U.S. ===
After spending time with Piteå IF and Umeå IK in her native Sweden, Ökvist signed with NWSL team Boston Breakers in October 2017 ahead of the 2018 season. However, prior to the beginning of the season, the Boston Breakers folded and Ökvist was selected by the Houston Dash as the 13th pick in the resultant dispersal draft on 7 March 2018. Two weeks later, Ökvist was traded to the Orlando Pride in exchange for Orlando's third-round pick in the 2019 NWSL College Draft. On 3 July 2018, the Orlando Pride announced that they had released Ökvist, allowing her to pursue opportunities in Europe. Ökvist never appeared in a game for the Pride.

=== Return to Sweden ===
On 4 July 2018, Hammarby IF of the Damallsvenskan in Sweden announced they had signed Ökvist for the remainder of the 2018 season. The team was relegated to the Elitettan. Ökvist remained with Hammarby through 2019, starting every Elitettan match prior to her departure in August.

=== Manchester United ===
On 20 August 2019, Ökvist signed for Manchester United in the English FA WSL. Ökvist made her debut for Manchester United against Manchester City in the FA WSL on 7 September 2019, a 1–0 loss in the inaugural Manchester derby.

=== BK Häcken ===
On 14 January 2021, reigning Swedish champions Kopparbergs/Göteborg FC (renamed BK Häcken ahead of the 2021 season) announced they had signed Ökvist from Manchester United on a two-year deal. She made her debut on 13 March starting in the first game of the season, a 1–0 win over Växjö DFF in the Svenska Cupen. In her first season with the club, Ökvist made 22 league appearances, helping her side reach a 2nd place in the Damallsvenskan table.

In 2022, Ökvist lost her place as a starter at BK Häcken to Anna Sandberg, only making 14 appearances as the side finished 2nd in the table for a second consecutive season. On 1 September 2022, she was sent on loan to fellow Damallsvenskan club Eskilstuna United for the rest of the year.

=== Return to Hammarby ===
On 29 December 2022, Ökvist signed a three-year contract with her former club Hammarby. On 6 June 2023, Hammarby won the 2022–23 Svenska Cupen. Ökvist remained on the bench in the final, that ended in a 3–0 win at home against BK Häcken. The club also won the 2023 Damallsvenskan, claiming its second Swedish championship after 38 years, with Ökvist making 14 appearances throughout the season.

== International career ==
Ökvist has represented Sweden at under-17, under-19, and under-23 levels. In 2015, she helped Sweden win the UEFA Women's Under-19 Championship.

In March 2020, Ökvist was called up to the senior Sweden national team for the first time to compete at the 2020 Algarve Cup. She made her senior international debut on 7 March, starting in the second game of the tournament against Denmark.

== Career statistics ==
=== Club ===
As of match played 12 November 2023

Appearances and goals by club, season and competition
Club	Season	League			National Cup (Note: Includes the Svenska Cupen and Women's FA Cup)		Other		Total	
Club	Season	Division	Apps	Goals	Apps	Goals	Apps	Goals	Apps	Goals
Piteå IF	2013	Damallsvenskan	4	0	1	0	—		4	0
Piteå IF	2014	Damallsvenskan	12	0	2	0	—		14	0
Piteå IF	2015	Damallsvenskan	11	0	0	0	—		11	0
Piteå IF	Total		27	0	3	0	—		30	0
Umeå IK	2016	Damallsvenskan	11	1	1	0	—		12	1
Piteå IF	2016	Damallsvenskan	8	0	1	1	—		9	1
Piteå IF	2017	Damallsvenskan	20	1	0	0	—		20	1
Piteå IF	Total		28	1	1	1	—		29	2
Orlando Pride	2018	NWSL	0	0	—		—		0	0
Hammarby	2018	Damallsvenskan	6	1	1	0	—		7	1
Hammarby	2019	Elitettan	18	2	0	0	—		18	2
Hammarby	Total		24	3	1	0	—		25	3
Manchester United	2019–20	FA WSL	3	0	0	0	3 (Note: Appearances in the Women's League Cup)	0	6	0
Manchester United	2020–21	FA WSL	3	0	0	0	1	0	4	0
Manchester United	Total		6	0	0	0	4	0	10	0
BK Häcken	2021	Damallsvenskan	22	2	5	0	8 (Note: Appearances in the UEFA Women's Champions League)	0	35	2
BK Häcken	2022	Damallsvenskan	14	1	4	0	0	0	18	1
BK Häcken	Total		36	3	9	0	8	0	53	3
Eskilstuna United (loan)	2022	Damallsvenskan	5	0	1	1	—		6	1
Hammarby IF	2023	Damallsvenskan	14	0	5	0	—		19	0
Career total			151	8	21	2	12	0	184	10

== Honours ==
=== Club ===
Hammarby IF

- Svenska Cupen: 2022–23
- Damallsvenskan: 2023

=== International ===
Sweden

- UEFA Women's Under-19 Championship: 2015
