= Dani Weatherholt =

American soccer player (born 1994)

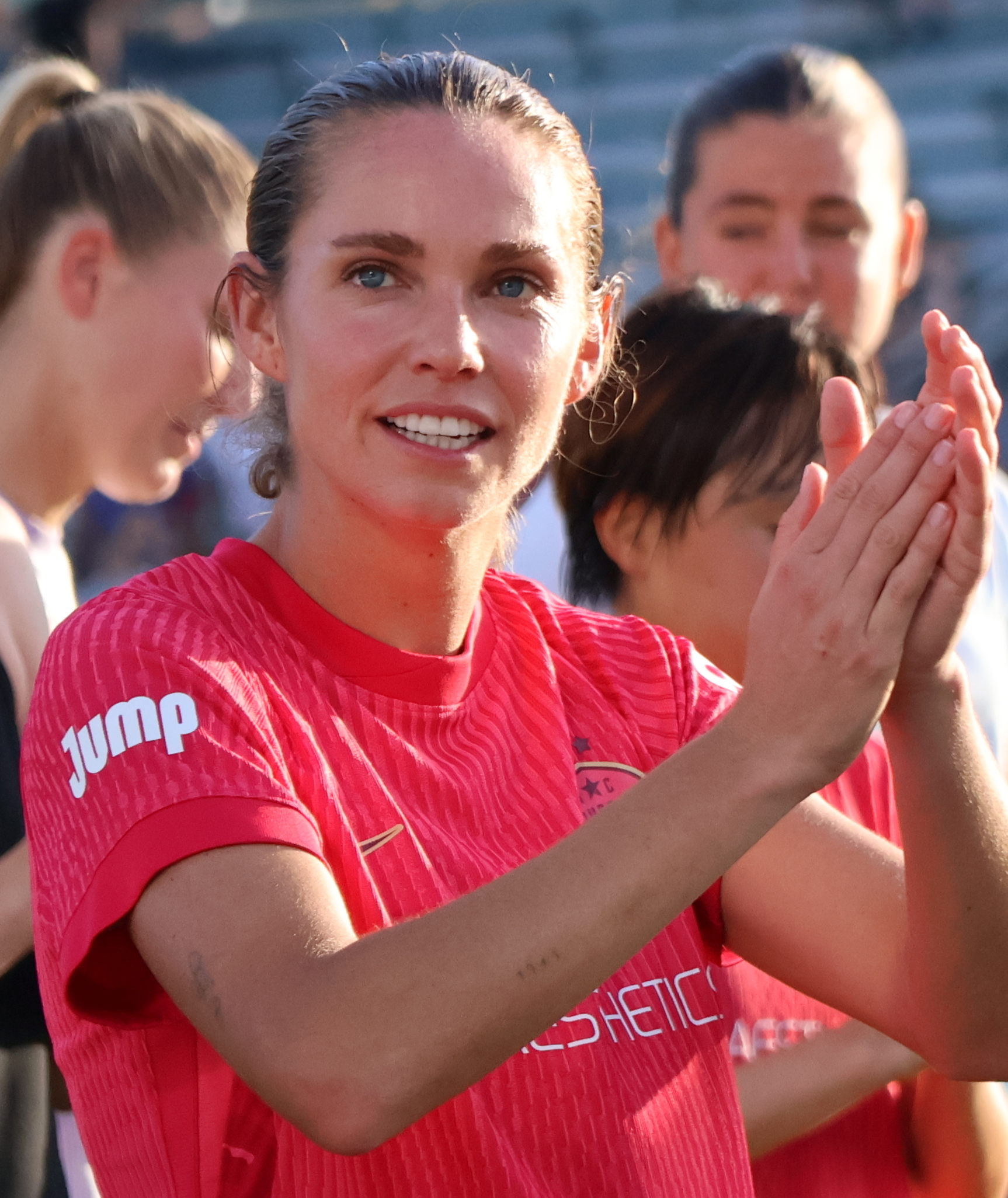
- Weatherholt with the North Carolina Courage in 2025

Personal information
- Full name: Danielle Marie Weatherholt
- Date of birth: March 17, 1994 (age 32)
- Place of birth: Laguna Beach, California, U.S.
- Height: 5 ft 8 in (1.73 m)
- Positions: Midfielder; center back; left back

Team information
- Current team: North Carolina Courage
- Number: 17

Youth career
- SoCal Blues

College career
Years	Team	Apps	(Gls)
2012–2015	Santa Clara Broncos	85	(10)

Senior career*
Years	Team	Apps	(Gls)
2016–2019	Orlando Pride	73	(3)
2018–2019	→ Melbourne Victory (loan)	11	(0)
2020–2021	OL Reign	19	(0)
2022–2023	Angel City	41	(0)
2024–	North Carolina Courage	55	(2)

International career
2010	United States U17		
2011	United States U18		
2013	United States U20		
2017	United States U23		
- * Club domestic league appearances and goals as of 06:59, November 8, 2026 (UTC)

Danielle Marie Weatherholt (born March 17, 1994) is an American professional soccer player who plays as a midfielder or defender for the North Carolina Courage of the National Women's Soccer League (NWSL). She played college soccer for the Santa Clara Broncos and was drafted by the Orlando Pride in the fourth round of 2016 NWSL College Draft. In 2018, she joined Melbourne Victory on loan and won the W-League Premiership. After four seasons in Orlando, she was traded to the OL Reign in 2020, then selected by Angel City FC with the first pick in the 2022 NWSL Expansion Draft. She signed with the Courage as a free agent in 2024.

== Early life ==
Weatherholt was born in Laguna Beach, California, to Doug and Gail Weatherholt. She was raised with her two brothers in Capistrano Beach, California, where she attended San Clemente High School. At San Clemente High School, Weatherholt played on the women's varsity soccer team for four years.

Weatherholt played club soccer for Southern California Club for nine years, seven of which she served as team captain. She played for Cal South State Team in 2011–2012 when she was ranked #5 in Southern California and #19 nationally by Top Drawer Soccer. During her time playing for Southern California Club, Weatherhiolt contributed to the acquisition of the following awards: 2011 ODP National Champions, 2011 U17 Far West Regional Champions, 2011 First Team ODP All Stars, 2011 NSCAA Youth All American Team, 2011 NSCAA High School Girls All-Region VIII Team, 2010 ODP Thanksgiving Interregional Team, 2010 U17 San Diego Surf College Cup Finalist, 2009–10 ODP Region IV Finalists and 2009–10 Region IV Champions

== College career ==
Weatherholt attended Santa Clara University from 2012 to 2015 where she majored in Liberal Studies and Pre-Teaching. During her freshman year she started all 22 games and was named to the All-WCC Honorable Mention, WCC All-Freshman team as well as to the Top Drawer Soccer Freshman Team of the Year. During her sophomore year she played in all 22 games and helped the Broncos to the Round of 16 of the 2013 NCAA Division I Women's Soccer Tournament. Her junior year saw her start all 20 games for he Broncos where she was named All-WCC Honorable Mention and WCC All-Academic Honorable Mention. Weatherholt started all 21 games of her senior year. She once again made the WCC All-Academic Honorable Mention as well as the Third Team All-West Region, First Team All-WCC and NSCAA Scholar Second Team All-West Region.

== Club career ==
=== Orlando Pride (2016–2019) ===
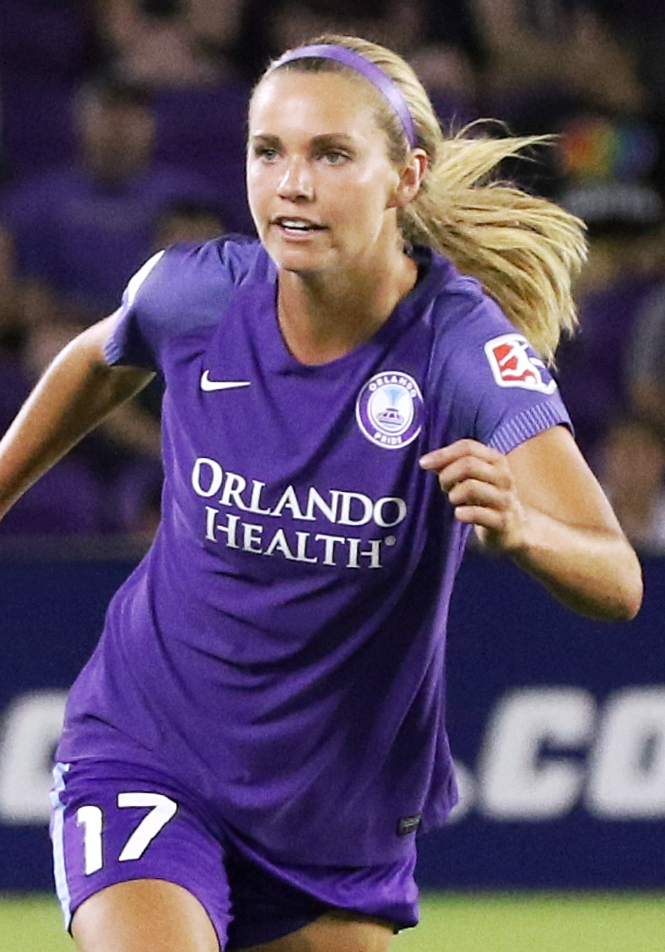
Weatherholt playing for the Pride in 2018

In January 2016, Weatherholt was selected by Orlando Pride in the fourth-round (31st overall pick) of the 2016 NWSL College Draft. She signed with the club in April 2016. She went on to play 12 appearances her first year at the club. She had her contract option exercised for the 2017 season where she made 19 appearances and scored one goal. She was offered a new contract for the 2018 season. During that season Weatherholt played 23 games for the club, tied for the most in the season for any Orlando Pride player alongside Shelina Zadorsky. Her contract option was exercised for the 2019 season.

==== Loan to Melbourne Victory (2018–2019) ====
On October 16, 2018, the Melbourne Victory announced they had signed Weatherholt on loan for the 2018–2019 W-League season. She made 12 appearances as the team won the Premiership title, marking Weatherholt's first professional trophy.

=== OL Reign (2020–2021) ===
On January 22, 2020, Weatherholt was traded to OL Reign in exchange for Reign's natural second-round pick in the 2021 NWSL College Draft.

=== Angel City FC (2022–2023) ===
Weatherholt was selected by Angel City FC with the first overall pick the 2022 NWSL Expansion Draft. She made 41 regular season appearances across two seasons in Los Angeles, winning 185 duels, 47 tackles and creating 10 chances.

=== North Carolina Courage (2024–present) ===
On January 16, 2024, North Carolina Courage announced they had signed Weatherholt as a free agent to a two-year contract through 2025. She made her club debut as a 74th-minute substitute to score the last goal in a 5–1 opening day win over the Houston Dash March 16. Head coach Sean Nahas deployed her variously at defensive midfielder, center back, and left back, saying: "That's why we brought her here. She is basically a Swiss Army knife". On December 1, 2025, the Courage announced a one-year contract extension for Weatherholt through 2026.

== International career ==
In April 2015, Weatherholt was called up to the United States under-23 team.

== Personal life ==
In July 2024, Weatherholt was one of five active NWSL players who represented the NWSL Players Association at the final negotiations in Philadelphia that updated the league's collective bargaining agreement through 2030.

== Career statistics ==
As of March 25, 2024

Club	League	Season	League		Cup		Total	
Club	League	Season	Apps	Goals	Apps	Goals	Apps	Goals
Orlando Pride	NWSL	2016	12	0	—		12	0
Orlando Pride	NWSL	2017	20	1	—		20	1
Orlando Pride	NWSL	2018	23	2	—		23	2
Orlando Pride	NWSL	2019	19	0	—		19	0
Orlando Pride	Total		74	3	0	0	74	3
Melbourne Victory (loan)	W-League	2018–19	12	0	—		12	0
OL Reign	NWSL	2020	—		3	0	3	0
OL Reign	NWSL	2021	20	0	4	0	24	2
Angel City FC	NWSL	2022	20	0	6	0	26	0
Angel City FC	NWSL	2023	21	0	6	0	27	0
North Carolina Courage	NWSL	2024	2	1	—		2	1
Career total			149	4	19	0	168	6

== Honors and awards ==
Santa Clara Broncos

- West Coast Conference: 2013

Melbourne Victory

- W-League Premiership: 2018–19

Individual

- First-team All-WCC: 2015
