= Danica Evans =

American soccer player

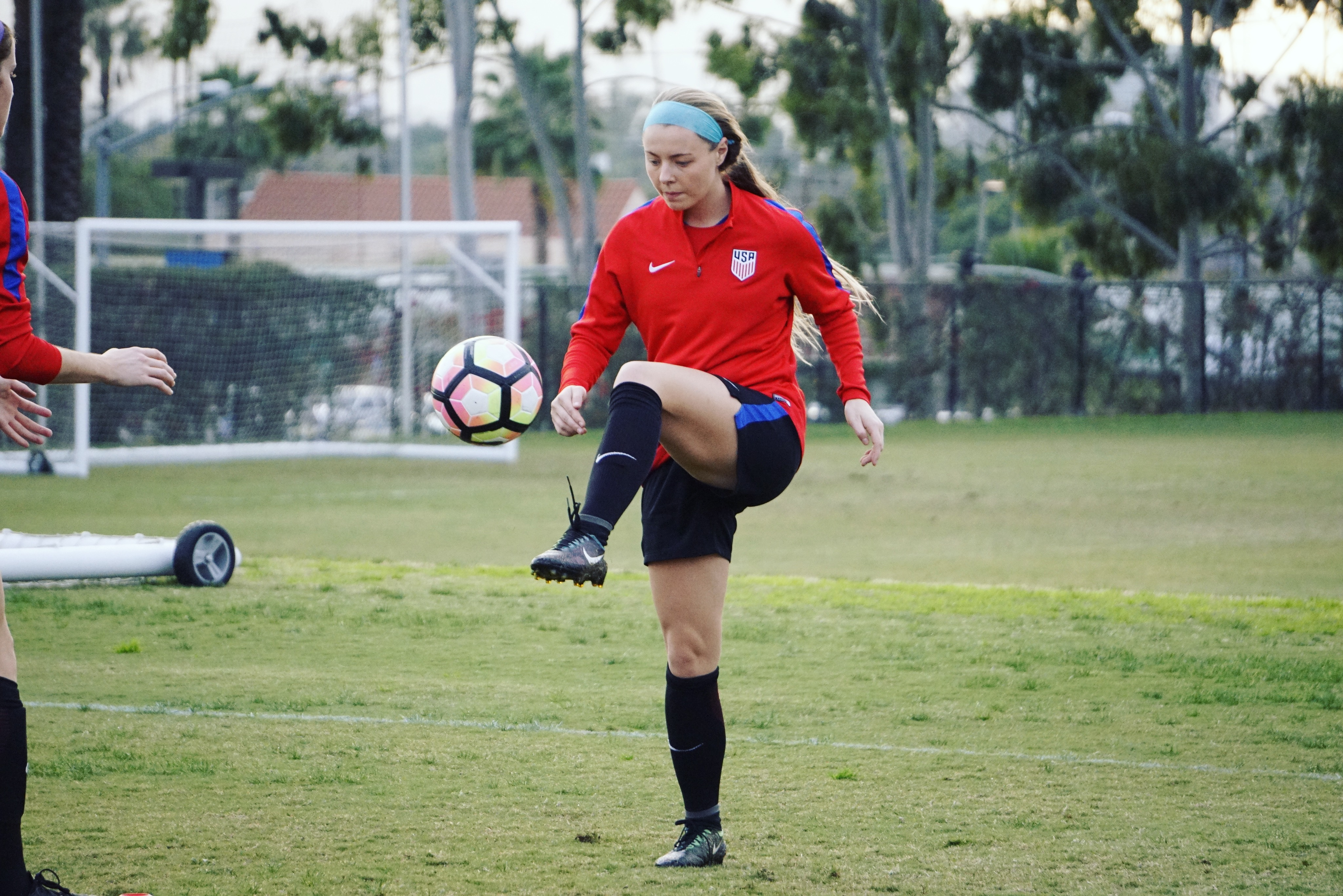

Personal information
- Full name: Danica Lynn Evans
- Date of birth: June 2, 1995 (age 31)
- Place of birth: Littleton, Colorado, United States
- Height: 5 ft 6 in (1.68 m)
- Position: Forward

Youth career
- Colorado Edge
- Colorado Rush

College career
| Years | Team | Apps | (Gls) |
| 2013–2014 | Portland Pilots | 39 | (12) |
| 2015–2016 | Colorado Buffaloes | 42 | (16) |

Senior career*
| Years | Team | Apps | (Gls) |
| 2012–2015 | Colorado Rush | | (29) |
| 2017–2019 | Orlando Pride | 26 | (2) |
| 2020 | Sporting de Huelva | 4 | (0) |
| 2020 | North Carolina Courage | 4 | (0) |

International career
| 2011 | United States U17 | | |
| 2017 | United States U23 | | |
- * Club domestic league appearances and goals as of April 18, 2023

Danica Lynn Evans (born June 2, 1995) is an American soccer player who last played as a forward for North Carolina Courage in the NWSL.

== Club career ==
=== Colorado Rush, 2012–2015 ===
After playing for the club's youth teams, Evans played for the Colorado Rush senior women's team in the USL W-League for four years. In the 2014 season, Evans scored 13 goals in 12 appearances, winning the league's Golden Boot award.

=== Orlando Pride, 2017–2019 ===
Evans was drafted in the third round (22nd overall) of the 2017 NWSL College Draft by Orlando Pride. She made her first appearance for the club as a substitute against the Portland Thorns in the opening game of the season. One week later, during Orlando Pride's first home game at Orlando City Stadium, Evans came off the bench to score her first professional goal, an 87th-minute equalizer in a 1–1 draw against Washington Spirit. The strike was voted NWSL Goal of the Week.

Evans was waived on January 10, 2020, in order to pursue a playing opportunity in Europe.

=== Sporting de Huelva, 2020 ===
On January 21, 2020, Evans signed with Spanish Primera División club Sporting de Huelva. She made her debut on January 26 as a 60th minute substitute in a 1–0 defeat to Sevilla. On June 8, 2020, Evans was one of 11 players not retained under contract by the club at the end of the season.

=== North Carolina Courage, 2020 ===
In September 2020, Evans returned to the NWSL to sign with North Carolina Courage through 2020 ahead of the fall series friendlies.

== Career statistics ==
=== Club ===
As of September 3, 2020

| Club | Season | League | | | Cup (Note: Includes the Copa de la Reina.) | | Total | |
| Club | Season | Division | Apps | Goals | Apps | Goals | Apps | Goals |
|---|---|---|---|---|---|---|---|---|
| Orlando Pride | 2017 | NWSL | 12 | 1 | – | | 12 | 1 |
| Orlando Pride | 2018 | NWSL | 5 | 0 | – | | 5 | 0 |
| Orlando Pride | 2019 | NWSL | 9 | 1 | – | | 9 | 1 |
| Orlando Pride | Total | | 26 | 2 | 0 | 0 | 26 | 2 |
| Sporting de Huelva | 2019–20 | Primera División | 4 | 0 | 1 | 0 | 5 | 0 |
| North Carolina Courage | 2020 | NWSL | 0 | 0 | – | | 0 | 0 |
| Career total | | | 30 | 2 | 1 | 0 | 31 | 2 |
