= Kristen Edmonds =

American soccer player (born 1987)

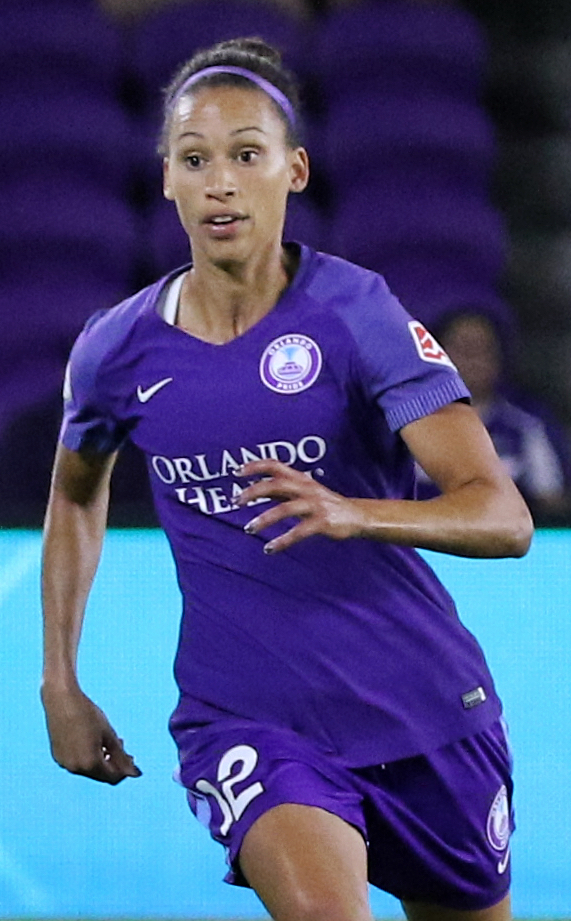
- Edmonds with the Orlando Pride in 2018

Personal information
- Full name: Kristen Nicole Edmonds
- Date of birth: May 22, 1987 (age 39)
- Place of birth: Metuchen, New Jersey, U.S.
- Height: 1.65 m (5 ft 5 in)
- Positions: Defender; midfielder

College career
Years	Team	Apps	(Gls)
2005–2008	Rutgers Scarlet Knights		

Senior career*
Years	Team	Apps	(Gls)
2005–2006	New Jersey Wildcats		
2009–2010	Hudson Valley Quickstrike Lady Blues		
2011	Stjarnan	7	(1)
2012–2013	WFC Rossiyanka	23	(1)
2014–2015	Western New York Flash	33	(0)
2016–2020	Orlando Pride	69	(9)
2021–2022	Kansas City Current	42	(1)
2023–2024	NJ/NY Gotham FC	14	(0)
2024	Tampa Bay Sun	13	(0)
- * Club domestic league appearances and goals as of August 18, 2024

Kristen Nicole Edmonds (born May 22, 1987) is an American professional soccer player. She previously played for Stjarnan in Iceland, WFC Rossiyanka in Russia, and the Western New York Flash, Orlando Pride, and Kansas City Current, and NJ/NY Gotham FC in the National Women's Soccer League (NWSL).

== College career ==
=== Rutgers Scarlet Knights, 2005–2008 ===
Edmonds attended Rutgers University from 2005 to 2008 where she played for the Rutgers Scarlet Knights. During her freshman season, she became the first rookie to lead the team in scoring since Carli Lloyd. Edmonds scored six goals and recorded six assists. She was named the SoccerBuzz All-Region Freshman First Team. The following season, she scored two goals and recorded one assist in the 16 games in which she played. During her senior year, she was a starter in all 22 games, scored five goals and registered six assists.

== Club career ==
After her collegiate career, Edmonds attended tryouts for Sky Blue FC twice but failed to make the roster.

=== New Jersey Wildcats, 2005–2006 ===
Edmonds played for USL W-League team New Jersey Wildcats in the 2005 and 2006 USL W-League seasons. The team won the W-League double as regular-season and post-season champions in 2015, and Edmonds made four appearances during the season, scoring two goals and registering an assist.

=== Hudson Valley Quickstrike Lady Blues, 2009–2010 ===
Edmonds played for newly formed USL W-League team Hudson Valley Quickstrike Lady Blues for two years under coach Jesse Kolmel. Edmonds registered an assist in the team's first-ever match in May 2009. The team won two regular-season championships with Edmonds, in 2009 and 2010, and reached the semi-finals both seasons.

=== Stjarnan, 2011 ===
In 2011, Edmonds signed with Icelandic team, Stjarnan and helped the team win the league championship and Icelandic Women's Cup. She played with undiagnosed ligament tears in one of her ankles, which required surgery and rehabilitation after returning to the United States.

=== WFC Rossiyanka, 2012–2013 ===
Edmonds joined WFC Rossiyanka of the Russian Premier League for the 2012–13 season. She made 13 appearances, scored two goals, and recorded seven assists. Rossiyanka finished in first place during the regular season with a 10–1–3 record. She made two appearances with the club in the 2012–13 UEFA Champions League. During the 2013 season, Edmonds made 13 starts in 13 games and scored one goal. Rossiyanka finished in fourth place during the regular season with a 8–4–2 record. She made four appearances for the club in the 2013–14 UEFA Champions League.

=== Western New York Flash, 2014–15 ===
Edmonds signed with the Western New York Flash in the National Women's Soccer League (NWSL) for the 2014 season. She started in 19 of the 22 games and recorded one assist while playing as a defender. The Flash finished the regular season in seventh place with a 8–12–4 record.

After returning for the 2015 season, Edmonds 10 starts in her 11 appearances for the club and recorded one assist. The club finished in seventh place with a 6–9–5 record.

=== Orlando Pride, 2016–2020 ===
In December 2015, Edmonds was traded to expansion team Orlando Pride. Edmonds started in all of the 19 games in which she played and scored six goals from the midfield. The team finished in ninth place with a 6–13–1 record during its inaugural season. She was named NWSL Player of the Week for Week 12 after scoring a brace against the Boston Breakers to lead the Pride to a 2–1 win.

=== Kansas City Current, 2021–2022 ===
On January 30, 2021, the Pride traded Edmonds to Kansas City Current with the natural second-round pick in the 2022 NWSL Draft in exchange for Gunnhildur Yrsa Jónsdóttir and the playing rights to Erika Tymrak. After an altercation during an April 9, 2021, match with Portland Thorns FC forward Morgan Weaver, Edmonds was suspended for two games in the 2021 NWSL Challenge Cup. Kansas City re-signed edmonds to a new contract on January 18, 2022.

Edmonds played for Kansas City in the 2022 NWSL Championship match against Portland, where the Current lost 2–0.

=== NJ/NY Gotham FC, 2022–2024 ===
On December 1, 2022, Edmonds signed as a free agent with NJ/NY Gotham FC. She cited being closer to family and her home as factors in the move from Kansas City. She left the club by mutual agreement on August 9, 2024, to pursue an opportunity with Tampa Bay Sun FC of the USL Super League.

=== Tampa Bay Sun FC, 2024 ===
Edmonds was announced as a member of the Tampa Bay Sun on August 14, 2024, ahead of the inaugural USL Super League season. Edmonds played all 13 matches in the 2024 Fall Season before departing the club in January 2025.

== International career ==
On October 27, 2016, Edmonds was called up to United States national team training camp for the first time.

== Career statistics ==
As of October 17, 2020.

Club	Season	League			Cup (Note: Includes Icelandic Cup)		Continental (Note: Includes UEFA Women's Champions League)		Other		Total	
Club	Season	Division	Apps	Goals	Apps	Goals	Apps	Goals	Apps	Goals	Apps	Goals
Stjarnan	2011	Úrvalsdeild	7	1	1	1	–	–	–	–	8	2
Rossiyanka	2012	Russian Championship	10	0	–	–	2	0	–	–	12	0
Rossiyanka	2013	Russian Championship	13	1	–	–	4	0	–	–	17	1
Rossiyanka	Total		23	1	0	0	6	0	0	0	29	1
Western New York Flash	2014	NWSL	22	0	–	–	–	–	–	–	22	0
Western New York Flash	2015	NWSL	11	0	–	–	–	–	–	–	11	0
Western New York Flash	Total		33	0	0	0	0	0	0	0	33	0
Orlando Pride	2016	NWSL	19	6	–	–	–	–	–	–	19	6
Orlando Pride	2017	NWSL	23	2	–	–	–	–	–	–	23	2
Orlando Pride	2018	NWSL	15	1	–	–	–	–	–	–	15	1
Orlando Pride	2019	NWSL	13	0	–	–	–	–	–	–	13	0
Orlando Pride	2020	NWSL	–	–	–	–	–	–	3 (Note: Includes the NWSL Fall Series)	1	3	1
Orlando Pride	Total		70	9	0	0	0	0	3	1	73	10
Career total			133	11	1	1	6	0	3	1	143	13

== Honors ==
with Stjarnan

- Úrvalsdeild winner: 2011

with Rossiyanka

- Russian Women's Football Championship runners-up: 2012–13

with Orlando Pride

- NWSL Player of the Week: 2016 (week 12)

NJ/NY Gotham FC

- NWSL Championship: 2023
