= Camila (footballer) =

Brazilian footballer (born 1994)

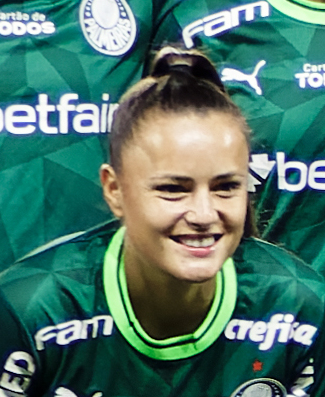
- Camila playing for Palmeiras in 2023

Personal information
- Full name: Camila Martins Pereira
- Date of birth: 10 October 1994 (age 32)
- Place of birth: São Bento do Sul, Brazil
- Height: 1.61 m (5 ft 3 in)
- Positions: Defender; midfielder

Team information
- Current team: São Paulo
- Number: 10

Senior career*
Years	Team	Apps	(Gls)
2013–2014	Kindermann	16	(3)
2015	Houston Dash	12	(0)
2015	Tiradentes	8	(2)
2016	Ferroviária	8	(1)
2017–2020	Orlando Pride	49	(5)
2018	→ Iranduba (loan)	0	(0)
2019–2020	→ Canberra United (loan)	10	(0)
2020	→ Palmeiras (loan)	14	(3)
2021–2023	Palmeiras	52	(6)
2024–	São Paulo	23	(3)

International career^{‡}
2014	Brazil U20	3	(0)
2014–	Brazil	20	(2)
- * Club domestic league appearances and goals as of 19:31, 17 March 2025 (UTC) ‡ National team caps and goals as of 19:31, 20 March 2024

Camila Martins Pereira (born 10 October 1994), commonly known as Camila or Camilinha, is a Brazilian professional footballer who currently plays as a midfielder or outside back for Brazilian Série A1 team São Paulo.

== Club career ==
=== Kindermann ===
Camila debuted for Kindermann of Santa Catarina in 2013, making her league debut for the club against Foz Cataratas on 18 September 2013. She scored her first goal for the club against Duque de Caxias on 12 October 2014, scoring in the 45th+1st minute.

=== Houston Dash ===
She was signed by Houston Dash in May 2015. She made her league debut against Portland Thorns on 7 June 2015. The Dash waived her in January 2016.

=== Tiradentes ===
Camila made her league debut for Tiradentes against América Mineiro on 30 September 2015. She scored her first goal for the club against Flamengo on 7 October 2015, scoring in the 65th minute.

=== Ferroviária ===
Camila made her league debut for Ferroviária against Rio Preto on 22 March 2016. She scored her first goal for the club against São Francisco EC on 29 March 2016, scoring in the 64th minute.

=== Orlando Pride ===
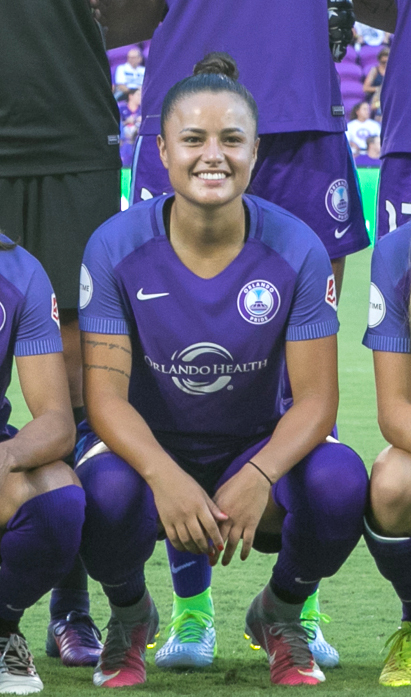
Camila playing for Orlando Pride in 2017

On 19 December 2016, the Orlando Pride announced that they had signed Camila for the 2017 season. She made her league debut for the club against Portland Thorns on 15 April 2017. Camila scored her first league goal for the club against North Carolina Courage on 29 April 2017, scoring in the 27th minute.

On 30 September 2017 Camila suffered a torn ACL and MCL sprain in her right knee during Orlando's final regular season game in North Carolina. As a result, she missed Orlando's playoff game the following week.

Camila made her first appearance of the 2018 season following recovery from injury on 7 July against the Washington Spirit.

=== Loan to Iranduba ===
In 2018, Camila spent the NWSL offseason on loan with Iranduba in Brazil. She played in all 5 of the team's Copa Libertadores matches as they finished third in their inaugural season in the competition.

=== Loan to Canberra United ===
During the 2019–20 NWSL offseason, Camila joined the Australian W-League for the first time, signing a loan deal with Canberra United. She made her debut for the team in the season opener on 17 November 2019, registering an assist in a 2–0 win over Perth Glory before being named to the W-League team of the week. Camila played in the first 10 games of Canberra's season before suffering an MCL injury in training, ruling her out for the rest of the campaign.

=== Loan to Palmeiras ===
On August 12, 2020, Camila joined Série A1 team Palmeiras on loan. She made her league debut for the club against Ponte Preta on 29 August 2020. Camila scored her first goal for the club against Audax on 27 September 2020, scoring in the 52nd minute.

=== Palmeiras ===
In February 2021, she joined the club permanently following the expiration of her contract with Orlando. Camila made her league debut for the club against Ferroviária on 19 April 2021. She scored her first goal for the club against Kindermann on 21 April 2021, scoring in the 41st minute.

== International career ==
At the 2014 FIFA U-20 Women's World Cup in Canada, Camila made three appearances for Brazil and served one assist.

She made her debut for the national side against France on 26 November 2014. Camila scored her first goal for Brazil against Japan on 28 July 2017, scoring in the 87th minute.

== Career statistics ==
=== Club ===
As of 10 December 2020

Club	League	Season	League		Cup		Continental		Total	
Club	League	Season	Apps	Goals	Apps	Goals	Apps	Goals	Apps	Goals
Kindermann	Série A	2013	3	0	–		–		3	0
Kindermann	Série A	2014	13	3	–		–		13	3
Houston Dash	NWSL	2015	12	0	–		–		12	0
Tiradentes	Série A	2015	8	2	–		–		8	2
Ferroviária	Série A	2016	8	1	–		–		8	1
Orlando Pride	NWSL	2017	24	4	0	0	–		24	4
Orlando Pride	NWSL	2018	9	0	–		–		9	0
Orlando Pride	NWSL	2019	16	1	–		–		16	1
Orlando Pride	Total		49	5	0	0	0	0	49	5
Iranduba (loan)	Série A	2018	0	0	–		5	0	5	0
Canberra United (loan)	W-League	2019–20	10	0	0	0	–		10	0
Palmeiras (loan)	Série A	2020	14	3	7 (Note: Campeonato Paulista)	2	–		21	5
Career total			117	14	7	2	5	0	129	16

=== International goals ===
As of match played 24 August 2017. Brazil score listed first, score column indicates score after each Camila goal.

Goal	Date	Location	Opponent	Score	Result	Competition
1	27 July 2017	(United States) CenturyLink Field, Seattle, Washington	Japan	1–1	1–1	2017 Tournament of Nations
2	3 August 2017	(United States) StubHub Center, Carson, California	Australia	1–0	1–6	2017 Tournament of Nations

== Honours ==
Kindermann

- Campeonato Catarinense: 2013, 2014

Grêmio Audax

- Copa do Brasil de Futebol Feminino: 2016

Palmeiras

- Copa Libertadores: 2022
- Campeonato Paulista: 2022
- Copa Paulista Feminina: 2021

São Paulo

- Campeonato Brasileiro Série A1: 2026
- Supercopa do Brasil: 2025
