= Sam Witteman =

American soccer player (born 1994)

Personal information
- Full name: Samantha Lynn Witteman
- Date of birth: February 26, 1994 (age 32)
- Place of birth: Redondo Beach, California
- Height: 5 ft 3 in (1.60 m)
- Position: Defender

College career
Years	Team	Apps	(Gls)
2012–2015	California Golden Bears	84	(14)

Senior career*
Years	Team	Apps	(Gls)
2016	Orlando Pride	16	(0)
2016	→ Apollon Limassol (loan)		
2017	North Carolina Courage	12	(0)
2018	PSV	11	(1)

International career
2016–2017	United States U23		
- * Club domestic league appearances and goals as of May 27, 2018

Samantha Lynn Witteman (born February 26, 1994) is an American former soccer player. Shortly after graduating from the University of California, Berkeley, where she played for the California Golden Bears, Witteman was drafted by the Orlando Pride as their first round pick in the NWSL College Draft in January 2016.

== Early life ==
Witteman was born in Redondo Beach, California, where she attended Redondo Union High School where she was a four-year varsity letter winner. She was named First Team All-Bay League and Bay League's Most Offensive Player in her junior and senior years. During her senior year, she scored 23 goals and made 19 assists. She was voted captain of the varsity soccer team two years in a row. In 2009 and 2011, she was recognized as Redondo Union High School's Most Outstanding Student Athlete.

Witteman played on the Cal South Olympic Development Team from 2008 to 2011 and attended the U.S. Soccer U-14 National ID Camp. She was also a member of the Region IV pool in 2009 and 2011.

== College career ==
During her freshman year at the University of California, Berkeley, Witteman played in 19 of the 22 games of the season, securing one assist. In her sophomore year, she started in seven of the 21 games of the season scoring six goals and logging four assists. One of her six goals was the game winning point against the University of California, Davis, and another game winner against Saint Mary's College of California.

Following her junior season, the Pac-12 Conference recognized Witteman with an All-Academic Honorable Mention in 2014. She started in 18 games, and played in all 22 of the season. Samantha scored in each of the two National Collegiate Athletic Association tournament games against San Diego State University and the University of Florida. She scored four goals and made eight assists. One of her goals won the game against Pacific University. Witteman gave an assist to Kory Lamet, securing a win against Oregon State University.

Witteman's senior year at Berkeley was an all-star season. She was named on all-Pac-12's First Team and the National Soccer Coaches Association of America awarded her All-American status. She was also recognized as Muscle Milk's Student Athlete of the Week for the week of October 19, 2015. Witteman started all 21 games of the season, filling seven different positions at least once, securing four game winning goals throughout the season.

Witteman's coach during her college soccer career was Neil McGuire, who previously coached her future Orlando Pride teammate, Alex Morgan.

== Club career ==
=== Orlando Pride, 2016 ===
Witteman was selected tenth overall in the 2016 NWSL College Draft by the Orlando Pride. She was the first soccer player from UC Berkeley to be recruited to the National Women's Soccer League. She made her debut for the club in a match against the Chicago Red Stars on May 1, 2016. She made her first start a few days later against Seattle Reign FC.

=== North Carolina Courage, 2017 ===
In January 2017, Witteman was traded to the North Carolina Courage in exchange for Alanna Kennedy.

=== PSV, 2018 ===
In January 2018, Witteman signed with PSV Vrouwen.

== International career ==
In February 2016, Witteman was selected to the United States U23 for the Istria Cup.

== Honors ==
North Carolina Courage

- NWSL Shield: 2017
