= Chioma Ubogagu =

English footballer (born 1992)

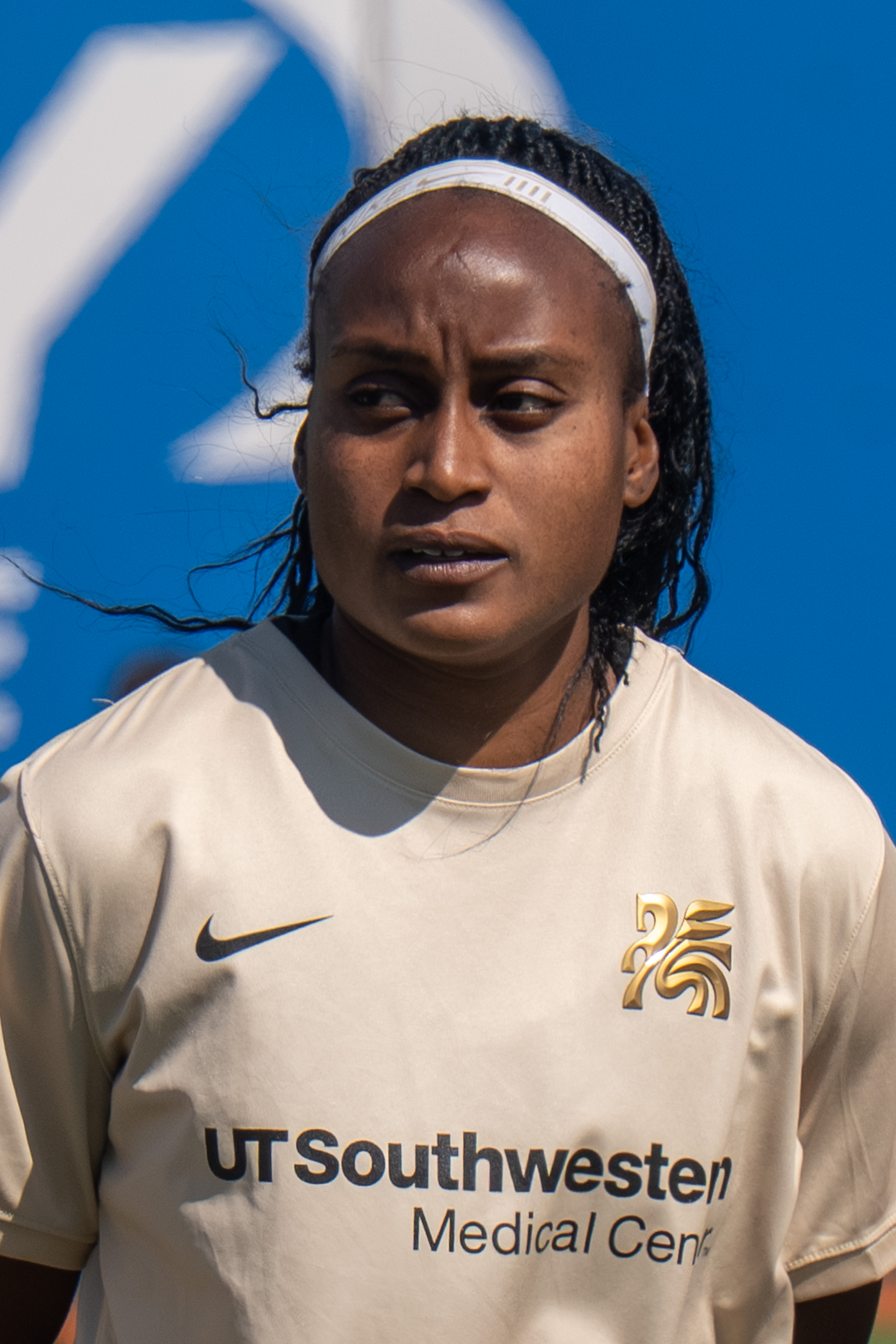
- Ubogagu with the Dallas Trinity in 2026

Personal information
- Full name: Chioma Grace Ubogagu
- Date of birth: 10 September 1992 (age 34)
- Place of birth: London, England
- Height: 1.70 m (5 ft 7 in)
- Position: Forward

Team information
- Current team: Dallas Trinity
- Number: 14

Youth career
- 2007–2010: Coppell Cowgirls

College career
Years	Team	Apps	(Gls)
2011–2014	Stanford Cardinal	89	(27)

Senior career*
Years	Team	Apps	(Gls)
2013–2014	Pali Blues		
2015	Arsenal	14	(6)
2016	Houston Dash	15	(1)
2017–2019	Orlando Pride	58	(12)
2018–2019	→ Brisbane Roar (loan)	11	(2)
2019–2021	Real Madrid	29	(7)
2021–2023	Tottenham Hotspur	19	(0)
2024–	Dallas Trinity	52	(6)

International career^{‡}
2008–2011	United States U18		
2012	United States U20		
2014–2015	United States U23		
2018–2019	England	3	(1)
- * Club domestic league appearances and goals as of 26 May 2026 ‡ National team caps and goals as of 26 September 2023

Chioma Grace Ubogagu (born 10 September 1992) is an English professional footballer who plays as a forward for USL Super League club Dallas Trinity. A former United States youth international, she represented England at senior level.

She previously played for Orlando Pride, Brisbane Roar, Houston Dash, Arsenal, Real Madrid, and Tottenham Hotspur. Ubogagu played collegiate soccer for Stanford University and was capped at various youth levels for the United States, winning the 2012 FIFA U-20 Women's World Cup. She chose to represent the England national team at the senior level in 2018, earning three caps.

== Early life and college career ==
Ubogagu was born in London, where her parents, mother Tina a nurse and father Aloy a social worker, had moved from Nigeria seeking job opportunities. At age 3, her parents divorced and she moved with her mother and older brother to Coppell, Texas a suburb in the Dallas–Fort Worth metroplex.

Ubogagu led her club team, D'Feeters, to two Texas-North State Cup titles, a U.S. Youth Soccer Association Region II championship and a 2010 third-place U-17 national finish, and led Coppell High School to the 2009 Texas 5A state title. She was also named 2010 Gatorade Texas Player of the Year, all-America three times by ESPN RISE and twice each by the NSCAA and Parade. In addition, she was all All-Area selection by Dallas Morning News, all four years of her high school career.

Ubogagu came to Stanford as the #1-ranked recruit in the nation by Top Drawer Soccer. During her freshman year, she won the Pac-12 Freshman of the Year in 2011 and helped the Cardinal win their first Women's College Cup, making the all-tournament team in the process. Stanford returned to the final in 2012 and to the semifinal in 2014. She finished her college career with 27 goals in 89 total appearances, made the All-Pac-12 team all four seasons, earning first-team honors in 2012 and 2014.

== Club career ==
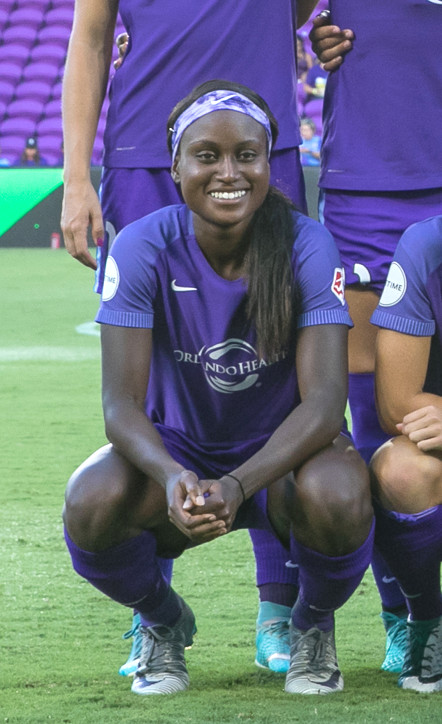
Ubogagu playing for the Orlando Pride in 2017

=== Arsenal ===
In January 2015, National Women's Soccer League's Sky Blue FC selected Ubogagu with the 28th pick of the 2015 NWSL College Draft, although coach Jim Gabarra acknowledged she was in negotiations with an FA WSL club. In February 2015, Ubogagu signed with Arsenal, the club she'd supported as a child and her British birth made it easier for her to acquire a United Kingdom work permit.

Ubogagu made her professional debut on 3 April 2015, scoring a goal in a 1–1 draw against Notts County.

=== Houston Dash ===
Arsenal released Ubogagu having reached the end of her contract in November 2015. She finished her season with seven goals in 21 appearances. Subsequently, the Houston Dash acquired the rights to Ubogagu from the Sky Blue FC in exchange for picks in the 2016 and 2017 college drafts. The trade gave the Dash an opportunity to sign her before the start of the NWSL season in March 2016.

Ubogagu was named NWSL Player of the Week in week 4 of the 2016 season for her one-goal and one assist performance to lead Houston to a 2–1 victory over FC Kansas City.

=== Orlando Pride ===
On 23 January 2017, the Orlando Pride acquired Ubogagu from the Houston Dash, in exchange for Orlando's natural third round pick in the 2018 NWSL College Draft. In 2017 Ubogagu appeared in 19 games for Orlando, scoring 4 goals. On 16 February 2018 the Orlando Pride announced they had signed Ubogagu to a new contract ahead of the 2018 season. On 29 August 2019, Ubogagu was waived by the Orlando Pride to allow her to pursue a playing opportunity in Europe.

==== Brisbane Roar (loan) ====
On 5 October 2018, Brisbane Roar announced they had signed Ubogagu for the 2018–19 W-League season, where she would be joining fellow Orlando Pride teammate Carson Pickett on loan. She scored her first goal for the team on 29 November 2018, in a 1–0 victory over Newcastle Jets. She ended the season with 2 goals.

=== CD Tacón/Real Madrid ===
On 31 August 2019, Ubogagu joined Spanish Primera División team CD Tacón.

=== Tottenham Hotspur ===
On 31 July 2021, Ubogagu joined Tottenham Hotspur on a two-year contract. In April 2022, Ubogagu was suspended for 9 months backdated to start from January 2022 for anti-doping violations as a result of taking medication prescribed by a personal doctor to treat acne before signing for the club. She made her return to playing in October 2022. She was confirmed to have left the club upon the expiry of her contract at the end of 2022–23 season having made 27 appearances for the club, scoring one goal.

=== Dallas Trinity ===
Having last played in March 2023, Ubogagu had returned to the United States to undergo treatment for a fibroid and an ovarian cyst. She made a return to professional football in July 2024 when she signed for Dallas Trinity ahead of the inaugural USL Super League season.

Ubogagu made her club debut on 18 August 2024 during Dallas's inaugural match against Tampa Bay Sun FC in a 1–1 draw. She also provided the first assist in club history in extra time of the first half. On 13 September 2024, in a home match against Lexington SC, Ubogagu scored twice in the second half, becoming the first player in club and league history to record a brace. Her performance helped Dallas secure their first-ever victory ending in 6–2. On 9 March 2025, she scored an early opener against Brooklyn FC and assisted Allie Thornton twice in the span of three minutes to boost Dallas to a 6–0 victory over the league leaders. On 31 May 2025, she scored the second goal in the season finale against the Carolina Ascent, a 2–1 win that secured a playoff berth for Dallas.

== International career ==
Because of her parents and her place of birth, Ubogagu was eligible to represent Nigeria, England or the United States. She chose to represent the United States at the youth level, playing for their under-18, under-20 and under-23 teams. She chose to represent England at the senior level, accepting a call up from the side in October 2018 and making her England and senior international debut on 8 November 2018.

Ubogagu has represented the United States at youth levels, including U-18, U-20, and U-23 teams. With the U-20, she won the 2012 FIFA U-20 Women's World Cup, appearing in all six games and scoring once, and the 2012 CONCACAF Women's U-20 Championship, where she scored the winning goal in the final, and scored six goals in a stretch of eight games at one point in 2012.

Ubogagu received her first call-up to the United States Women's National Team on 31 October 2017 for the set of two friendlies against Canada in November. Ubogagu was not capped for the full national team and she did not dress as part of the 18 for either game.

Phil Neville called Ubogagu up to the England national team for a set of friendlies in November 2018 against Sweden and Austria. She scored on her England and senior international debut in a 3–0 win against Austria on 8 November 2018.

Ubogagu was allotted 210 when the FA announced their legacy numbers scheme to honour the 50th anniversary of England's inaugural international

== Personal life ==
Her grandfather Austin Eneuke played for Nigeria and Tottenham Hotspur. Ubogagu became an Arsenal fan watching the North London derby, despite her father urging her to support Tottenham.

Her name Chioma means "Good God" in the Igbo language, spoken primarily by the Igbo people in south eastern Nigeria.

== Career statistics ==
=== Club ===
As of match played 23 May 2026.

Club	Season	League			League cup		National cup (Note: includes Women's FA Cup, Copa de la Reina)		Other (Note: includes FA Women's League Cup)		Total	
Club	Season	Division	Apps	Goals	Apps	Goals	Apps	Goals	Apps	Goals	Apps	Goals
Arsenal	2015	FA WSL 1	14	6	–		–		5	1	19	7
Houston Dash	2016	NWSL	15	1	–		–		–		15	1
Orlando Pride	2017	NWSL	20	4	–		–		–		20	4
Orlando Pride	2018	NWSL	21	4	–		–		–		21	4
Orlando Pride	2019	NWSL	17	4	–		–		–		17	4
Orlando Pride	Total		87	19	–		–		5	1	92	20
Brisbane Roar (loan)	2018–19	W-League	11	2	–		–		–		11	2
Real Madrid	2019–20	Primera División	18	5	–		2	0	–		20	5
Real Madrid	2020–21	Primera División	11	2	–		0	0	–		11	2
Real Madrid	Total		29	7	–		2	0	–		31	7
Tottenham Hotspur	2021–22	WSL	10	0	–		0	0	3	1	13	1
Tottenham Hotspur	2022–23	WSL	9	0	–		2	0	3	0	14	0
Tottenham Hotspur	Total		19	0	–		2	0	6	1	27	1
Dallas Trinity FC	2024–25	USL Super League	25	5	1 (Note: Includes appearance in USL Super League playoffs)	0	–		–		26	5
Dallas Trinity FC	2025–26	USL Super League	27	1	0	0	–		–		27	1
Dallas Trinity FC	Total		52	6	1	0	0	0	0	0	53	6
Career total			182	32	1	0	4	0	11	2	198	34

=== International ===
As of match played 10 April 2019

Appearances and goals by national team and year
National team	Year	Apps	Goals
England	2018	1	1
England	2019	2	0
Total		3	1

Scores and results list England goal tally first, score column indicates score after each Ubogagu goal.

List of international goals scored by Chioma Ubogago
No.	Date	Venue	Opponent	Score	Result	Competition	Ref.
1	8 November 2018	BSFZ-Arena, Maria Enzersdorf, Austria	Austria	1–0	3–0	Friendly	

== Honours ==
United States U20

- FIFA U-20 Women's World Cup: 2012
- CONCACAF Women's U-20 Championship: 2012

England

- SheBelieves Cup: 2019

College

- NCAA Division I Women's Soccer Championship: 2011
