= Nickolette Driesse =

Puerto Rican footballer (born 1994)

- Driesse with Florida State in 2014

Personal information
- Full name: Nickolette Taylor Driesse
- Date of birth: November 8, 1994 (age 31)
- Place of birth: Wayne, New Jersey, U.S.
- Height: 1.65 m (5 ft 5 in)
- Position: Midfielder

Youth career
- Wayne Hills High School
- Player Development Academy

College career
Years	Team	Apps	(Gls)
2013–2014	Florida State Seminoles	48	(1)
2015–2016	Penn State Nittany Lions	48	(5)

Senior career*
Years	Team	Apps	(Gls)
2017	Orlando Pride	4	(0)
2018	Sky Blue	1	(0)
2018	Split	7	(4)

International career^{‡}
2012	United States U18		
2013–2014	United States U20		
2021–	Puerto Rico	4	(2)
- * Club domestic league appearances and goals as of November 25, 2018 ‡ National team caps and goals as of October 23, 2021

Nickolette Taylor Driesse (born November 8, 1994) is a professional footballer who plays as a midfielder. Born in the mainland United States, she plays for the Puerto Rico women's national team. She last played for ŽNK Split in the Croatian First Division. In May 2019, Driesse was appointed as head coach of Northern Highlands girls soccer team.

== Early years ==
Driesse grew up in Wayne, New Jersey and attended Wayne Hills High School, where she scored 88 goals and notched 46 assists. She was nominated all-League, all-County and all-State each of the four years that she played for Wayne Hills HS. Driesse was named All-County Player of the Year as a sophomore and was also nominated All-State Player of the Year as a junior. In 2012, she was included in the first team ESPN High School All-America.

== College career ==
After a very successful career at high school, Driesse was contacted by several colleges and universities and in the fall of her junior year at Wayne Hills High School she committed with North Carolina Tar Heel. However, as a senior she declined to sign a Letter of intent, finally deciding for Florida State University. Driesse played two seasons at Florida. In 2013, she was the only Seminole freshman to play all 28 matches in the season (starting 27). She also helped the team to reach the finals of the 2013 NCAA Division I Women's Soccer Tournament where they eventually lost, in the final, for the UCLA Bruins. For her performance in this year, she earned several accolades, including being nominated for the All-ACC Freshman Team, Soccer America All-Freshman First Team, ACC All-Academic Team and TopDrawerSoccer.com Freshmen Best XI Second Team. In the next year, as a sophomore, Driesse saw her time on the field severely cut. She only started six matches in the season as her team claimed the 2014 NCAA Division I Women's Soccer Tournament. She, then, decided for a transfer. In the beginning of 2015, unhappy with her short playing time and her tactical position on the field (she was playing as a holding midfielder, when her preferred position is as an attacking midfielder) she traded the Seminoles for the Nittany Lions. She chose Penn State mostly because of coach Erica Walsh that she knew from her previously experience with the United States U20 team. "I wanted a coach who was invested in me. I knew Coach Walsh would push me hard and focus on the small details that would help make me the best player possible", she stated. From the beginning, Driesse played a key role at Penn State. Playing in all 27 matches (including 20 starts) and recording four goals and six assists. She helped their team to win the 2015 NCAA Division I Women's Soccer Tournament. Making her a back-to-back champion for two different universities. In 2016, as a senior, Driesse was named co-captain and started all 21 matches she played. She was also nominated for the All-Big Ten First Team, Big Ten All tournament Team and Academic All-Big Ten.

== Club career ==
In 2012 and 2013, Driesse played for the North Jersey Valkyries at the W-League.

On 12 January 2017, Driesse was picked by Orlando Pride in the 2017 NWSL College Draft. She was the 32nd pick overall. On 29 April 2017, Driesse made her debut, replacing Chioma Ubogagu in the 82nd minute of the match against North Carolina Courage.

She was waived by the club on 9 February 2018.

== International career ==
In 2012, Driesse was called for the United States U18 team. In 2013, Driesse attended several camps with the United States U20 team. On 17 July 2014, Driesse was surprisingly included by coach Michelle French in the 21-players roster that represented the United States at the 2014 FIFA U-20 Women's World Cup in Canada. She was one of the seven players called, who were not a part of the team that won the 2014 CONCACAF Women's U-20 Championship. She didn't play any minute at the World Cup and United States was eliminated for North Korea in the Quarterfinals.

In May 2021, Driesse was called up by Puerto Rico. She made her senior debut on 15 June that year in a 0–3 friendly away loss to Uruguay.

=== International goals ===
As of match played 23 October 2021. Scores and results list Puerto Rico's goal tally first, score column indicates score after each Driesse goal.

List of international goals scored by Nickolette Driesse
No.	Date	Venue	Opponent	Score	Result	Competition	Ref.
1	20 October 2021	Juan Ramón Loubriel Stadium, Bayamón, Puerto Rico	Guyana	5–0	6–1	Friendly	
2	23 October 2021	Juan Ramón Loubriel Stadium, Bayamón, Puerto Rico	Guyana	1–0	2–1	Friendly	

== Honors ==
Florida State Seminoles

- NCAA Division I Women's Soccer Championship: 2014

Penn State Nittany Lions

- NCAA Division I Women's Soccer Championship: 2015
