= 2017 NWSL Championship =

Women's soccer match in Florida, US

- Event: NWSL Championship
North Carolina Courage	Portland Thorns FC
0	1
- Date: October 14, 2017
- Venue: Orlando City Stadium, Orlando, Florida, U.S.
- Most Valuable Player: Lindsey Horan (Portland Thorns FC)
- Referee: Danielle Chesky
- Attendance: 8,124

The 2017 NWSL Championship was the fifth edition of the NWSL Championship, the championship match of the National Women's Soccer League (NWSL), and took place on October 14, 2017. Portland Thorns FC won 1–0 against the NWSL Shield holders North Carolina Courage, becoming NWSL champions for the second time. The match was played at Orlando City Stadium in Orlando, Florida.

== Road to the final ==
=== North Carolina Courage ===
After winning the 2016 NWSL Championship, the Western New York were sold to Steve Malik; relocated to Cary, North Carolina; and renamed the North Carolina Courage. Unshaken by the move, the Courage won the NWSL Shield in the 2017 season with the best record in the league. Returning NWSL Golden Boot winner and 2016 Most Valuable Player Lynn Williams led the team in scoring, while midfielders Sam Mewis and McCall Zerboni would join defender Abby Dahlkemper in the NWSL Best XI announced after the championship match. Dahlkemper would also be named NWSL Defender of the Year in the days after the championship match.

In the playoff semifinals on October 27, the Courage held off the fourth seed Chicago Red Stars 1–0, with Denise O'Sullivan scoring in the 90th minute, to reach the franchise's second consecutive final.

=== Portland Thorns FC ===
After winning the NWSL Shield but losing to Western New York in the 2016 playoff semifinals, Portland Thorns FC placed second in the 2017 regular-season standings. Goalkeeper Adrianna Franch led a defense that conceded the fewest goals in the league, and would be named the league's Goalkeeper of the Year days after the championship match.

In the playoff semifinals, the Thorns won 4–1 over the third seed Orlando Pride, with goals scored by Amandine Henry, Emily Sonnett, Hayley Raso, and Christine Sinclair, sending the Thorns to their first final since the inaugural 2013 NWSL Championship.

== Match ==
=== Details ===
October 14, 2017
4:30pm (EDT)

North Carolina Courage	0–1	Portland Thorns FC
	Report	Horan 50'

Orlando City Stadium
Orlando, Florida
Attendance: 8,124
Referee: Danielle Chesky

North Carolina Courage	Portland Thorns FC

GK	99	(United States) Katelyn Rowland
LB	15	(United States) Jaelene Hinkle
CB	6	(New Zealand) Abby Erceg (c)
CB	13	(United States) Abby Dahlkemper
RB	11	(United States) Taylor Smith	(substituted off) 12'
MF	8	(Republic of Ireland) Denise O'Sullivan	(substituted off) 87'
MF	7	(United States) McCall Zerboni
MF	5	(United States) Sam Mewis
MF	23	(United States) Kristen Hamilton	(substituted off) 39'
FW	9	(United States) Lynn Williams
FW	12	(United States) Ashley Hatch
Substitutes:
GK	1	(Canada) Sabrina D'Angelo
DF	2	(Norway) Nora Holstad Berge
MF	3	(United States) Makenzy Doniak	(substituted in) 12'
FW	14	(United States) Jessica McDonald	(substituted in) 39'
FW	22	(United States) Stephanie Ochs	(substituted in) 87'
MF	25	(United States) Meredith Speck
DF	26	(United States) Sam Witteman
Manager:
(England) Paul Riley

GK	24	(United States) Adrianna Franch
LB	25	(United States) Meghan Klingenberg
CB	4	(United States) Emily Menges
CB	16	(United States) Emily Sonnett
LB	2	(United States) Katherine Reynolds
MF	7	(United States) Lindsey Horan
MF	12	(Canada) Christine Sinclair (c)
MF	28	(France) Amandine Henry		(substituted off) 90+3'
FW	17	(United States) Tobin Heath	(yellow card) 41'
FW	21	(Australia) Hayley Raso	(yellow card) 45+1'	(substituted off) 69'
FW	14	(Australia) Ashleigh Sykes		(substituted off) 54'
Substitutes:
GK	33	(United States) Britt Eckerstrom
FW	9	(Norway) Nadia Nadim		(substituted in) 69'
MF	10	(United States) Allie Long		(substituted in) 90+3'
MF	11	(Iceland) Dagný Brynjarsdóttir	(yellow card) 72'	(substituted in) 54'
FW	26	(United States) Mallory Weber
FW	30	(United States) Celeste Boureille
FW	34	(United States) Tyler Lussi
Manager:
(England) Mark Parsons

NWSL Championship Most Valuable Player:
(United States) Lindsey Horan

Assistant referees:
Adrienne McDonald (United States)
Cory Richardson (United States)
Fourth official:
Christina Unkel (United States)

Match rules

- 90 minutes.
- 30 minutes of extra time if necessary.
- Penalty shootout if scores still level.
- Maximum of three substitutions.
