= 2016 NWSL Championship =

Women's soccer match in Texas, US

- Event: NWSL Championship
Washington Spirit	Western New York Flash
2	2
- After extra time Western New York wins 3–2 on penalties
- Date: October 9, 2016
- Venue: BBVA Compass Stadium, Houston, Texas, U.S.
- Most Valuable Player: Sabrina D'Angelo (Western New York Flash)
- Referee: Matthew Franz
- Attendance: 8,255

The 2016 NWSL Championship was the fourth edition of the NWSL Championship, the championship match of the National Women's Soccer League (NWSL), and took place on October 9, 2016. It was contested between the Washington Spirit and the Western New York Flash to decide the champion of the 2016 season. The match was played at BBVA Compass Stadium in Houston, Texas.

Both teams reached the final by winning their semifinal matches in extra time. The championship game was tied 1–1 after regulation with early goals scored by Crystal Dunn and Sam Mewis. Dunn put the Spirit ahead at the start of extra time before Lynn Williams equalized in the 120+4th minute. Western New York won 3–2 in the first penalty shootout in NWSL history, with Sabrina D'Angelo saving three penalty kicks. The following year, Western New York relocated and became the North Carolina Courage; the team reached each of the next three NWSL Championships, winning two. Washington would win their first championship in 2021.

== Road to the final ==
=== Washington Spirit ===
The Washington Spirit finished the NWSL's inaugural 2013 season in eighth and last place but qualified for the playoffs the following two years, both times losing to Seattle Reign FC in the semifinals. Crystal Dunn led the NWSL in scoring in the 2015 season and was voted the league's Most Valuable Player. In the 2016 season, Dunn scored only twice, but the Spirit saw a balanced attack with three or more goals scored by six different players as they finished the season in second place. They had a chance to claim the NWSL Shield but lost the last two games of the season, including the final matchday against the Chicago Red Stars. In the first round of the playoffs, the Spirit took revenge on the Chicago Red Stars; Ali Krieger and Chicago's Christen Press traded goals in regulation before Francisca Ordega scored the 2–1 winner in extra time, sending the Spirit to the championship game.

=== Western New York Flash ===
The Western New York Flash played in the NWSL's inaugural championship game in 2013, a 2–0 defeat to Portland Thorns FC in Western New York's home stadium. They finished both of the following seasons in seventh place out of nine teams, missing the playoffs; the 2015 season was one of development for the Flash's strong draft class which included first-round picks Abby Dahlkemper, Sam Mewis, Lynn Williams, and Jaelene Hinkle and third-round pick goalkeeper Sabrina D'Angelo. Head coach/general manager Aaran Lines arranged the new roster by trading away star midfielder Carli Lloyd ahead of the draft. In the 2016 season, Western New York returned only seven players and brought in new head coach Paul Riley to manage the youngest roster in the league. Mewis recalled, "We were a hodgepodge group of people who, somehow, our tactic was to kick it and run. I don't think we strung more than ten passes together all season long".

Nevertheless, Western New York became the league's highest-scoring team with 40 goals in 20 games and finished the regular season in fourth place. Williams, who had undergone knee surgery the previous year, put together a breakout season as the NWSL's top scorer with 11 goals and 5 assists and was voted the league's Most Valuable Player. New signing Jessica McDonald added 10 goals (third in the league) and 7 assists (second only to Tobin Heath), earning NWSL Best XI honors. Williams and Dahlkemper received their first United States national team call-ups toward the end of the season. In the first round of the playoffs, the Flash drew NWSL Shield winners Portland Thorns FC 2–2 in regulation on goals from Mewis and rookie Makenzy Doniak. Riley was sent off for arguing with the referees after Portland's first goal scored by Christine Sinclair (meaning he would be suspended for the final). Williams then scored twice in extra time, with her second and winning goal coming off a long dribble and assist by Mewis, as Western New York prevailed 4–3 to advance to the championship game.

== Venue and broadcasting ==
The NWSL Championship game was held at BBVA Compass Stadium in Houston, Texas, the home stadium of the NWSL's Houston Dash and Major League Soccer (MLS)'s Houston Dynamo.

The game was televised in the United States on Fox Sports 1, drawing an estimated audience of 180,000. Play-by-play commentary was provided by Jenn Hildreth with color analysis by Kyndra de St. Aubin.

== Match ==
=== Summary ===
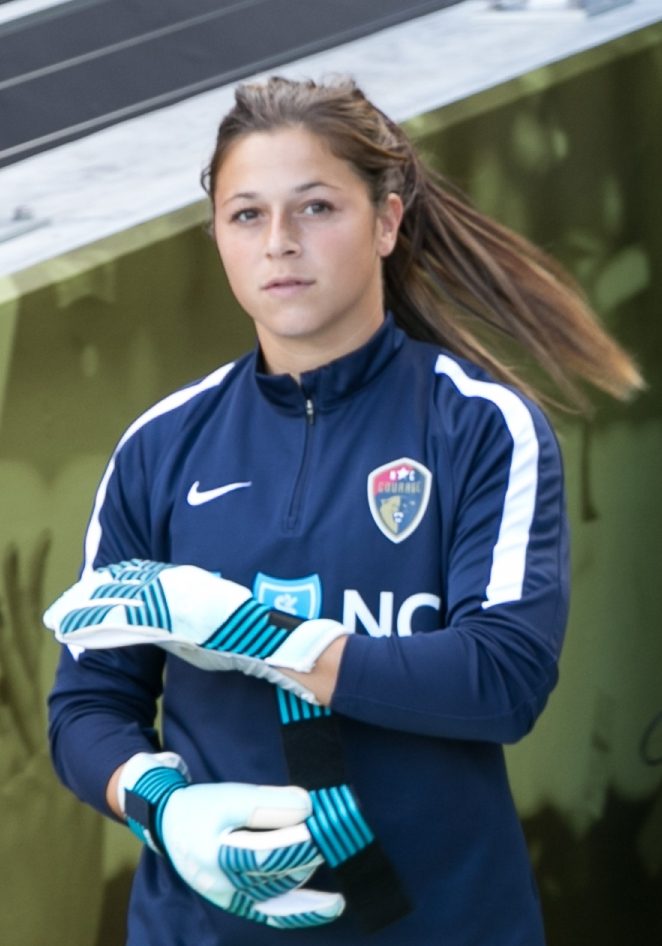
MVP Sabrina D'Angelo saved three penalty kicks in the shootout.

The Washington Spirit played in a new formation with three center backs that helped them maintain greater possession for the match. In the 9th minute, Washington's Crystal Dunn caught a long pass from Megan Oyster at the edge of the box, which goalkeeper Sabrina D'Angelo came out to challenge, but Dunn got around her and placed the ball into the open net from a wide angle. Sam Mewis responded in the 14th minute after Lynn Williams passed to her, collecting the ball outside the arc and taking a hard low shot which got past goalkeeper Kelsey Wys. Spirit defender Caprice Dydasco left the match early due to a knee injury. Neither of the Flash's attacking tandem of Williams and Jessica McDonald registered a shot attempt in the first half; they created more chances in the second half but did not put them away. The Spirit had the better run of play but were kept at bay by multiple diving saves by D'Angelo and eleven offside calls. The match stood 1–1 at the end of regulation.

In just the 59th second of extra time, Dunn rocketed a shot into the goal from the middle of the box. Mewis attempted to repeat her equalizer but was saved by Wys. The Spirit looked to be on their way to the championship as the clock ticked into the fourth minute of stoppage time when Williams headed in a cross, floated in by McDonald, past Wys's challenge and into the goal. It was Western New York's seventh comeback win or draw of the season. D'Angelo was the hero of the penalty shootout (the first in the NWSL), earning Most Valuable Player honors. She stopped the first kick by Ali Krieger and fourth by Tori Huster while McDonald was the only one of the Flash's first four penalty takers to miss her attempt, which went over the crossbar. Wys denied Mewis's chance to win the shootout before D'Angelo made her third save of the shootout against Diana Matheson as Western New York prevailed 3–2.

=== Details ===
October 9, 2016
4:00 CDT

Washington Spirit	2–2 (a.e.t.)	Western New York Flash
Dunn 9', 91'; Wys (yellow card) 120+2'	Report	Mewis 14'; Zerboni (yellow card) 84'; Williams 120+4'
Penalties
Krieger (penalty missed); Nairn (penalty scored); Stengel (penalty scored); Huster (penalty missed); Matheson (penalty missed)	2–3	(penalty scored) Dahlkemper; (penalty scored) Hinkle; (penalty missed) McDonald; (penalty scored) Williams; (penalty missed) Mewis

BBVA Compass Stadium, Houston, Texas
Attendance: 8,255
Referee: Matthew Franz

Washington Spirit	Western New York Flash

GK	18	(United States) Kelsey Wys	(yellow card) 120+2'
CB	4	(United States) Megan Oyster
CB	6	(Canada) Shelina Zadorsky
CB	5	(United States) Whitney Church
MF	3	(United States) Caprice Dydasco		(substituted off) 22'
MF	11	(United States) Ali Krieger (c)
MF	23	(United States) Tori Huster
FW	19	(United States) Crystal Dunn
MF	7	(United States) Christine Nairn
MF	10	(Argentina) Estefanía Banini		(substituted off) 79'
FW	14	(Nigeria) Francisca Ordega		(substituted off) 113'
Substitutes:
GK	1	(Canada) Stephanie Labbé
DF	22	(United States) Alyssa Kleiner		(substituted on) 22'
DF	24	(Cameroon) Estelle Johnson
MF	8	(Canada) Diana Matheson		(substituted on) 79'
FW	12	(United States) Katie Stengel		(substituted on) 113'
FW	15	(United States) Joanna Lohman
FW	20	(Jamaica) Cheyna Matthews
Manager:
(United States) Jim Gabarra

GK	1	(Canada) Sabrina D'Angelo
RB	4	(United States) Elizabeth Eddy
CB	13	(United States) Abby Dahlkemper
CB	8	(Australia) Alanna Kennedy
LB	15	(United States) Jaelene Hinkle
MF	3	(United States) Makenzy Doniak		(substituted off) 80'
DM	6	(New Zealand) Abby Erceg (c)
MF	7	(United States) McCall Zerboni	(yellow card) 83'	(substituted off) 105'
MF	5	(United States) Sam Mewis
FW	14	(United States) Jessica McDonald
FW	9	(United States) Lynn Williams
Substitutes:
GK	28	(United States) Britt Eckerstrom
DF	20	(Belgium) Janice Cayman
DF	23	(United States) Courtney Niemiec
MF	2	(United States) Michaela Hahn
MF	11	(United States) Taylor Smith		(substituted on) 80'
MF	17	(United States) Kristen Hamilton		(substituted on) 105'
MF	25	(United States) Meredith Speck
Manager:
(United States) Scott Vallow (acting; (England) Paul Riley suspended for the match)

NWSL Championship Most Valuable Player:
(Canada) Sabrina D'Angelo

Assistant referees:
Alicia Messer (United States)
Nick Uranga (United States)
Fourth official:
Margaret Domka (United States)

Match rules

- 90 minutes.
- 30 minutes of extra time if necessary.
- Penalty shootout if scores still level.
- Maximum of three substitutions.

== Post-match ==
The Western New York Flash were sold after the 2016 season and relocated to become the North Carolina Courage. Core players from the Flash contributed to the Courage dominating the NWSL over the next three seasons, winning all three NWSL Shields and reaching all three NWSL Championships (of which they won two, in 2018 and 2019); the ten Western New York players who remained through that span were Katelyn Rowland, Sam Mewis, Abby Erceg, McCall Zerboni, Lynn Williams, Jessica McDonald, Abby Dahlkemper, Jaelene Hinkle, Kristen Hamilton and Meredith Speck. The Spirit would not qualify for the playoffs again until 2021, when they won their first championship.

In 2022, Sports Illustrated ranked the 2016 championship game as the greatest game in NWSL history.
