= 2019 NWSL Championship =

Women's soccer match in North Carolina, US

- Event: NWSL Championship
North Carolina Courage	Chicago Red Stars
4	0
- Date: October 27, 2019
- Venue: Sahlen's Stadium at WakeMed Soccer Park, Cary, North Carolina, U.S.
- Most Valuable Player: Debinha (North Carolina Courage)
- Referee: Rosendo Mendoza
- Attendance: 10,227

The 2019 NWSL Championship was the seventh edition of the NWSL Championship, the championship match of the National Women's Soccer League (NWSL), and took place on October 27, 2019. Defending double champions North Carolina Courage won 4–0 against the Chicago Red Stars, completing the league double for the second consecutive season. They were the first team to win the NWSL final at home as the final was held at Sahlen's Stadium at WakeMed Soccer Park in Cary, North Carolina.

== Road to the final ==
=== North Carolina Courage ===
After completing the NWSL's first double in the 2018 NWSL Championship, the Courage repeated as NWSL Shield champions in the 2019 regular season. The league's highest-scoring offense was led by NWSL Golden Boot runner-up Lynn Williams, while the league's lowest-conceding defense featured the past two NWSL Defenders of the Year in Abby Dahlkemper and Abby Erceg. In the playoff semifinals, the Courage won 4–1 over the fourth seed Reign FC in extra time, with extra-time goals scored by Debinha, Lauren Barnes (own goal), and Crystal Dunn, to reach the franchise's fourth consecutive NWSL final.

=== Chicago Red Stars ===
After losing to the Courage in the 2018 playoff semifinals, the Chicago Red Stars matched their best NWSL regular-season finish by placing second in the 2019 standings. They were led by three-time NWSL Golden Boot winner and two-time NWSL Most Valuable Player Sam Kerr who broke her own record for goals in a single NWSL season. She was joined in the NWSL Best XI by defenders Casey Short and Julie Ertz. In the playoff semifinals, an early goal by Sam Kerr was the difference in a 1–0 win over the third seed Portland Thorns FC, the Red Stars' first NWSL playoff win in their fifth playoff appearance.

== Match ==
=== Details ===
October 27, 2019
4:30pm EDT

North Carolina Courage	4–0	Chicago Red Stars
Debinha 8'; McDonald 26'; Dunn 45+5'; Mewis 61'	Report

Sahlen's Stadium at WakeMed Soccer Park
Cary, North Carolina
Attendance: 10,227
Referee: Rosendo Mendoza

North Carolina Courage	Chicago Red Stars

GK	1	(Canada) Stephanie Labbé
LB	15	(United States) Jaelene Hinkle
CB	6	(New Zealand) Abby Erceg (c)
CB	13	(United States) Abby Dahlkemper
RB	17	(United States) Heather O'Reilly		(substituted off) 89'
DM	8	(Republic of Ireland) Denise O'Sullivan
MF	5	(United States) Sam Mewis
AM	10	(Brazil) Debinha
AM	19	(United States) Crystal Dunn		(substituted off) 62'
FW	9	(United States) Lynn Williams
FW	14	(United States) Jessica McDonald		(substituted off) 75'
Substitutes:
GK	99	(United States) Katelyn Rowland
FW	23	(United States) Kristen Hamilton		(substituted in) 75'
DF	3	(United States) Kaleigh Kurtz
MF	16	(United States) Cari Roccaro		(substituted in) 89'
MF	25	(United States) Meredith Speck
MF	16	(Sweden) Julia Spetsmark
MF	7	(United States) McCall Zerboni	(yellow card) 74'	(substituted in) 62'
Manager:
(England) Paul Riley

GK	1	(United States) Alyssa Naeher
LB	25	(United States) Casey Short
CB	5	(United States) Katie Naughton
CB	8	(United States) Julie Ertz	(yellow card) 67'
RB	14	(United States) Sarah Gorden
DM	13	(United States) Morgan Brian
DM	24	(United States) Danielle Colaprico		(substituted off) 84'
AM	17	(Japan) Yūki Nagasato
AM	10	(United States) Vanessa DiBernardo	(yellow card) 47'	(substituted off) 75'
AM	9	(United States) Savannah McCaskill		(substituted off) 46'
FW	20	(Australia) Sam Kerr
Substitutes:
GK	21	(United States) Emily Boyd
MF	23	(United States) Brooke Elby		(substituted in) 84'
DF	32	(United States) Zoey Goralski
MF	33	(Mexico) Katie Johnson		(substituted in) 46'
DF	28	(United States) Kayla Sharples
MF	2	(United States) Nikki Stanton		(substituted in) 75'
MF	15	(Mexico) María Sánchez
Manager:
(England) Rory Dames

NWSL Championship Most Valuable Player:
(Brazil) Debinha

Assistant referees:
Jennifer Garner (United States)
Deleana Quan (United States)
Fourth official:
Kevin Broadley (United States)

Match rules

- 90 minutes.
- 30 minutes of extra time if necessary.
- Penalty shootout if scores still level.
- Maximum of three substitutions.
