= Ryan Williams (women's soccer) =

American soccer player (born 1996)

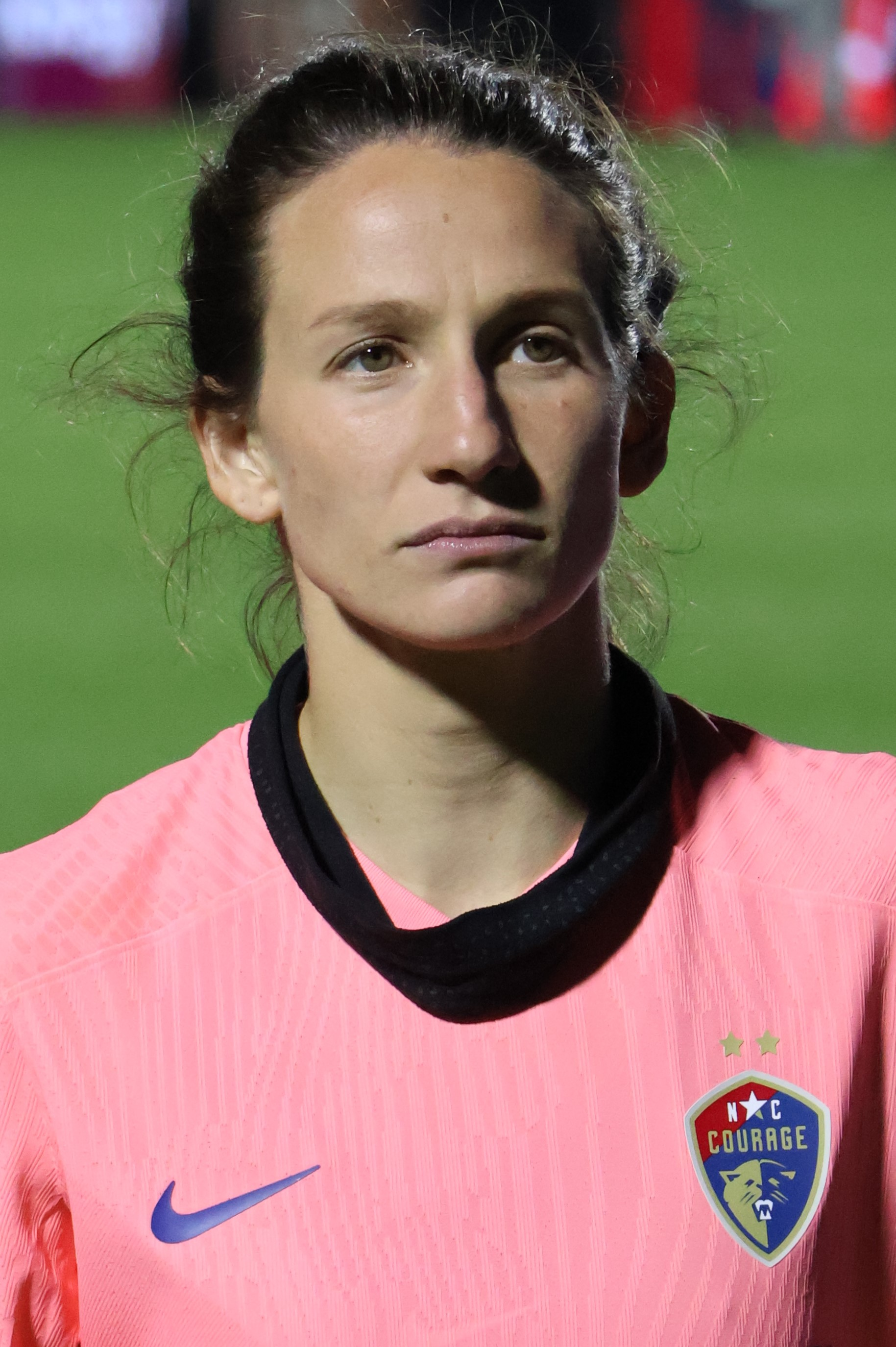
- Williams with the North Carolina Courage in 2024

Personal information
- Full name: Ryan Emilie Williams
- Date of birth: February 23, 1996 (age 30)
- Place of birth: Centennial, Colorado, United States
- Height: 5 ft 6 in (1.68 m)
- Position: Right back

Team information
- Current team: North Carolina Courage
- Number: 13

Youth career
- Colorado Rush

College career
Years	Team	Apps	(Gls)
2014–2017	TCU Horned Frogs	80	(1)

Senior career*
Years	Team	Apps	(Gls)
2018–	North Carolina Courage	143	(2)
- * Club domestic league appearances and goals as of 06:59, November 8, 2026 (UTC)

Ryan Emilie Williams (born February 23, 1996) is an American professional soccer player who plays as a right back for the North Carolina Courage of the National Women's Soccer League (NWSL).

Williams played college soccer for the TCU Horned Frogs and was drafted by the Courage with the final pick of the 2018 NWSL College Draft. She won two NWSL Shields and two NWSL Championships as a reserve player with the Courage before establishing herself as a starter in 2022. She has also won two NWSL Challenge Cups with the team. She was named in the NWSL Best XI Second Team in 2024.

== Early life and college career ==
Williams was born in Centennial, Colorado, one of six children born to Charles and Lisa Williams. She began playing soccer at four years old, and she played club soccer for ECNL team Colorado Rush. She attended Cherry Creek High School, where she won the 5A state championship as a sophomore in 2012. As a four-year letterwinner coming out of high school, she was ranked 16th regionally by TopDrawerSoccer.

=== TCU Horned Frogs ===
Williams made 80 appearances (79 starts) during four years with the TCU Horned Frogs. She was converted from midfielder to defender in college and named to the Big 12 Conference All-Newcomer Team after making 19 appearances (18 starts) as a freshman in 2014. She provided a team-high 5 assists in 19 games in her sophomore season in 2015. TCU lost in the opening round of the Big 12 tournament in her first two seasons. Williams made 2 assists in 20 starts in her junior season in 2016, missing one game. She helped TCU reach the final of the Big 12 tournament, where they lost to West Virginia 3–2 in overtime. TCU nevertheless qualified for the NCAA tournament for the first time in school history, falling to Texas A&M 1–0 in the first round.

Williams recorded a career-high six assists in 22 games in her senior season in 2017. In the Big 12 tournament, she made her penalty kicks in back-to-back shootout victories over Kansas and West Virginia. Head coach Eric Bell placed Williams as the fifth penalty taker "because we know she's got ice water in her veins". In the Big 12 championship game, Williams scored the only goal of her college career, with the help of a penalty, in a 2–1 loss to Baylor. TCU again qualified for the NCAA tournament, where they fell 2–1 to Arizona in the first round. Williams received All-Big 12 first-team honors at the end of the season.

== Club career ==
Williams was drafted by the North Carolina Courage with the 40th and final pick of the 2018 NWSL College Draft, becoming the first player from TCU to be drafted into the NWSL. She was signed to a national team replacement contract on May 31, 2018. Williams made her professional debut on June 3, coming on for Jaelene Hinkle late in a 1–1 draw against the Houston Dash. She was waived two weeks later but signed again the next month as a national team replacement. She appeared in two games at the exhibition 2018 Women's International Champions Cup, making her first start for the Courage in a 1–0 win over French club Lyon in the final. She was unused for the rest of the season, and the Courage went on to win the NWSL Shield and Championship, defeating the Portland Thorns 3–0 in the title game.

Williams agreed to a new contract ahead of the 2019 season but was moved to a supplemental spot on the final roster. Williams made her first NWSL start on June 1, winning 3–0 against the Orlando Pride. She played her first full match in a 2–1 win at the Washington Spirit on June 29. However, after 4 appearances (3 starts), she was listed out with injury for the rest of the season. North Carolina went on to win their second consecutive NWSL Shield and Championship, defeating the Chicago Red Stars 4–0 in the title game. Williams's contract option was exercised at the end of the season.

When the 2020 season was postponed due to the COVID-19 pandemic, Williams and her roommate Cari Roccaro prepared training videos for their teammates to follow from a safe distance. A new month-long tournament, the Challenge Cup, was announced in place of the beginning of the regular season. Williams started in one Challenge Cup match, a 1–0 win over the Chicago Red Stars on July 5. She also started 4 games of the Fall Series, recording her first professional assist on a goal scored by Lynn Williams during a 4–1 loss to the Houston Dash on October 4. After the season, she signed a one-year contract with an option to extend for an additional year.

Williams appeared in 17 games (2 starts) for the Courage in the 2021 regular season as they finished fifth in the standings. She also appeared in 4 games (1 start) in the NWSL Challenge Cup. She made her playoff debut in the closing minutes of the Courage's 1–0 quarterfinal loss to the eventual champions Washington Spirit.

Williams appeared in 3 games off the bench during the 2022 NWSL Challenge Cup ahead of the regular season. She was an unused substitute in the Challenge Cup final, which the Courage won 2–1 against the Washington Spirit. She finished the 2022 regular season with 3 assists in 18 appearances (10 starts) as the Courage placed 7th of 12 teams, missing the playoffs.

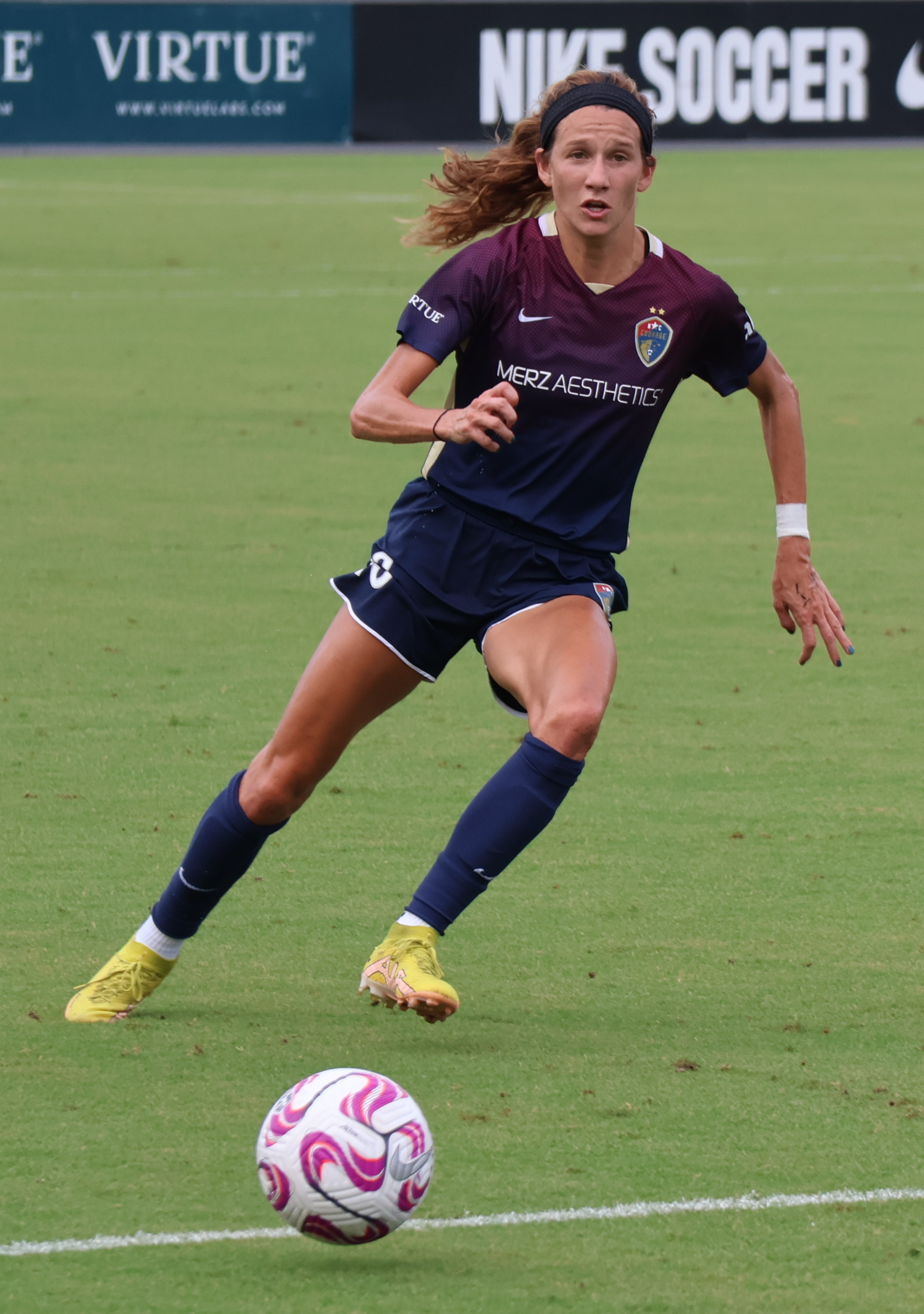
Williams in the 2023 NWSL Challenge Cup final

Williams started all 8 games in the 2023 NWSL Challenge Cup, playing the full match in a 2–0 victory over Racing Louisville in the final. She started all 22 games and made 2 assists in the regular season as the Courage finished in third place. In the playoffs, she played every minute of their first-round 2–0 loss to eventual champions NJ/NY Gotham FC.

Williams received two yellow cards and was sent off on June 8, 2024, with her second card giving Sophia Smith a penalty that led to a 1–0 away loss to the Portland Thorns. She finished the regular season with 25 starts and 2,237 minutes played, with just her red card and one-match suspension keeping her from an iron woman season. She ranked top two in the league in multiple defensive metrics, including tackles, challenges, and interceptions, and ranked first in attempted passes. North Carolina finished the regular season in fifth place, losing 1–0 to the Kansas City Current in the playoff quarterfinals. Williams signed a contract extension near the end of the season, keeping her with the club through 2027. She was named to the NWSL Best XI Second Team at the end of the season.

Williams scored her first professional goal—in the eighth season of her career—on April 26, 2025, and also assisted Ashley Sanchez's stoppage-time winner as the Courage came back twice to win 3–2 against the previously unbeaten Kansas City Current, the Courage's first win of the year. Head coach Sean Nahas had recently restructured the defense into a back three which allowed Williams to contribute to the attack more freely. On June 21, Williams marked her 100th regular-season appearance with a 2–1 win over the Houston Dash. She was even closer to an iron woman season in 2025, missing only four minutes in one game the entire season.

Williams was named a team captain going into the 2026 season alongside Natalie Jacobs and Kailen Sheridan.

== International career ==
Williams was called up by Emma Hayes to camp with the United States national team in January 2025, her first national team call-up at any level.

== Career statistics ==
As of November 9, 2024

Club	Season	League			Cup (Note: Includes the NWSL Challenge Cup)		Playoffs (Note: Includes NWSL Playoffs)		Other		Total	
Club	Season	Division	Apps	Goals	Apps	Goals	Apps	Goals	Apps	Goals	Apps	Goals
North Carolina Courage	2018	NWSL	1	0	—		0	0	—		1	0
North Carolina Courage	2019	NWSL	4	0	—		0	0	—		4	0
North Carolina Courage	2020	NWSL	—		1	0	—		4 (Note: Includes the NWSL Fall Series)	0	5	0
North Carolina Courage	2021	NWSL	17	0	4	0	1	0	—		22	0
North Carolina Courage	2022	NWSL	18	0	3	0	—		—		21	0
North Carolina Courage	2023	NWSL	22	0	8	0	1	0	—		31	0
North Carolina Courage	2024	NWSL	25	0	—		1	0	4 (Note: Includes the 2024 NWSL x Liga MX Femenil Summer Cup)	0	30	0
North Carolina Courage	2025	NWSL	26	1	—		—		—		26	1
Career total			113	1	16	0	3	0	8	0	114	1

== Honors ==
North Carolina Courage

- Women's International Champions Cup: 2018
- NWSL Championship: 2018, 2019
- NWSL Shield: 2018, 2019
- NWSL Challenge Cup: 2022, 2023

Individual

- NWSL Best XI Second Team: 2024
- First-team All-Big 12: 2017
- Big 12 All-Newcomer team: 2014
