= 2015 NWSL Championship =

Women's soccer match in Oregon, US

- Event: NWSL Championship
Seattle Reign FC	FC Kansas City
0	1
- Date: October 1, 2015
- Venue: Providence Park, Portland, Oregon, U.S.
- Most Valuable Player: Amy Rodriguez (FC Kansas City)
- Referee: Katja Koroleva
- Attendance: 13,264

The 2015 NWSL Championship was the third edition of the NWSL Championship, the championship match of the National Women's Soccer League (NWSL), and took place on October 1, 2014. In a rematch of the 2014 NWSL Championship, FC Kansas City defended their title by winning 1–0 against NWSL Shield holders Seattle Reign FC. The match took place at Providence Park in Portland, Oregon.

== Road to the final ==
=== Seattle Reign FC ===
After falling short of the league double in the 2014 NWSL Championship, Seattle Reign FC repeated as NWSL Shield winners in the 2015 season with the best record in the league. They were led by returning NWSL Most Valuable Player Kim Little and other NWSL Team of the Year selections Lauren Barnes, Jess Fishlock, and Beverly Goebel. In the playoffs, Reign defeated fourth seed Washington Spirit in the semifinals for the second consecutive year, with goals scored by Goebel, Megan Rapinoe, and Mariah Bullock.

=== FC Kansas City ===
Coming off their 2014 NWSL Championship victory, FC Kansas City placed third in the 2015 regular-season standings. Three-time NWSL Defender of the Year Becky Sauerbrunn and NWSL Team of the Year selection Amy LePeilbet led a defense that conceded the fewest goals in the league. In the playoff semifinals, Amy Rodriguez scored twice and Erika Tymrak also scored within the opening half hour as Kansas City won 3–0 against the second seed Chicago Red Stars.

== Match ==
=== Details ===
October 1, 2015
6:30pm PDT

Seattle Reign FC	0–1	FC Kansas City
	Report	Rodriguez 78'

Providence Park
Portland, Oregon
Attendance: 13,264
Referee: Katja Koroleva

Seattle Reign FC	FC Kansas City

GK	1	(United States) Hope Solo
DF	13	(United States) Kendall Fletcher
DF	4	(Scotland) Rachel Corsie
DF	3	(United States) Lauren Barnes
DF	14	(United States) Stephanie Cox	(substituted off) 77'
MF	11	(United States) Keelin Winters (c)
MF	8	(Scotland) Kim Little
MF	10	(Wales) Jess Fishlock
FW	9	(United States) Merritt Mathias	(substituted off) 72'
FW	15	(United States) Megan Rapinoe
FW	17	(United States) Beverly Yanez
Substitutes:
GK	8	(United States) Haley Kopmeyer
DF	7	(United States) Elli Reed	(substituted in) 77'
FW	18	(United States) Danielle Foxhoven
MF	20	(Samoa) Mariah Bullock
MF	22	(United States) Amber Brooks
FW	24	(Denmark) Katrine Veje	(substituted in) 72'
DF	25	(United States) Kiersten Dallstream
Manager:
(United States) Laura Harvey

GK	18	(United States) Nicole Barnhart
DF	13	(United States) Leigh Ann Brown
DF	17	(United States) Amy LePeilbet
DF	4	(United States) Becky Sauerbrunn (c)	(yellow card) 76'
DF	3	(United States) Becca Moros
MF	6	(United States) Jen Buczkowski
MF	25	(United States) Mandy Laddish		(substituted off) 90+2'
MF	15	(United States) Erika Tymrak		(substituted off) 88'
MF	9	(United States) Heather O'Reilly
MF	12	(United States) Lauren Holiday
FW	8	(United States) Amy Rodriguez		(substituted off) 90+3'
Substitutes:
GK	0	(United States) Katelyn Rowland
MF	2	(United States) Shea Groom		(substituted in) 88'
FW	5	(United States) Liz Bogus
FW	10	(United States) Frances Silva
MF	14	(United States) Yael Averbuch		(substituted in) 90+2'
FW	22	(United States) Sarah Hagen		(substituted in) 90+3'
FW	23	(United States) Caroline Kastor
Manager:
(North Macedonia) Vlatko Andonovski

Most Valuable Player:
(United States) Amy Rodriguez

Assistant referees:
Amanda Ross (United States)
Jennifer Garner (United States)
Fourth official:
Margaret Domka (United States)

Match rules

- 90 minutes.
- 30 minutes of extra time if necessary.
- Penalty shootout if scores still level.
- Maximum of three substitutions.
