= 2018 NWSL Championship =

Women's soccer match in Oregon, US

- Event: NWSL Championship
North Carolina Courage	Portland Thorns FC
3	0
- Date: September 22, 2018
- Venue: Providence Park, Portland, Oregon, U.S.
- Most Valuable Player: Jessica McDonald (North Carolina Courage)
- Referee: Guido Gonzales Jr.
- Attendance: 21,144

The 2018 NWSL Championship was the sixth edition of the NWSL Championship, the championship match of the National Women's Soccer League (NWSL), and took place on September 22, 2018. In a rematch of the 2017 NWSL Championship, the North Carolina Courage became the first NWSL Shield holders to complete the league double, winning 3–0 against defending champions Portland Thorns FC. The match was played at Portland's home field Providence Park.

== Road to the final ==
=== North Carolina Courage ===
After coming short of the league double in the 2017 NWSL Championship, the North Carolina Courage repeated as NWSL Shield champions in the 2018 season with the best record in the league, with just one loss all year. NWSL Defender of the Year Abby Erceg and returning NWSL Defender of the Year Abby Dahlkemper guided a defense that conceded the fewest goals in the league. McCall Zerboni and Crystal Dunn were also named in the NWSL Best XI, and NWSL Golden Boot runner-up Lynn Williams led the league's highest-scoring offense. In the playoff semifinals, the Courage won 2–0 over the fourth seed Chicago Red Stars, with goals scored by Jessica McDonald and Sam Mewis, to reach the franchise's third consecutive NWSL final.

=== Portland Thorns FC ===
After winning the 2017 NWSL Championship, Portland Thorns FC placed second in the 2018 regular-season standings. They were led by NWSL Most Valuable Player Lindsey Horan, the league's third-highest scorer, along with fellow NWSL Best XI honorees Tobin Heath, Emily Sonnett, and repeating NWSL Goalkeeper of the Year Adrianna Franch. In the playoff semifinals—the first Cascadia rivalry playoff game—the Thorns won 2–1 against the third seed Seattle Reign FC, with goals from Heath and Horan, to reach their second consecutive NWSL final.

== Match ==
=== Details ===
September 22, 2018
4:30pm (EDT)

North Carolina Courage	3–0	Portland Thorns FC
Debinha 13'; McDonald 40', 64'	Report

Providence Park
Portland, Oregon
Attendance: 21,144
Referee: Guido Gonzales Jr.

North Carolina Courage	Portland Thorns FC

GK	99	(United States) Katelyn Rowland
LB	15	(United States) Jaelene Hinkle
CB	6	(New Zealand) Abby Erceg (c)
CB	13	(United States) Abby Dahlkemper
RB	11	(United States) Merritt Mathias
MF	10	(Brazil) Debinha		(substituted off) 78'
MF	8	(Republic of Ireland) Denise O'Sullivan	(yellow card) 42'
MF	5	(United States) Sam Mewis
MF	19	(United States) Crystal Dunn		(substituted off) 87'
FW	9	(United States) Lynn Williams
FW	14	(United States) Jessica McDonald	(yellow card) 65'	(substituted off) 90+1'
Substitutes:
GK	1	(Canada) Sabrina D'Angelo
FW	23	(United States) Kristen Hamilton		(substituted in) 78'
FW	21	(United States) Darian Jenkins		(substituted in) 90+1'
DF	31	(United States) Kaleigh Kurtz
MF	17	(United States) Heather O'Reilly		(substituted in) 87'
MF	16	(United States) Cari Roccaro
MF	25	(United States) Meredith Speck
Manager:
(England) Paul Riley

GK	24	(United States) Adrianna Franch
LB	25	(United States) Meghan Klingenberg
CB	4	(United States) Emily Menges
CB	16	(United States) Emily Sonnett
LB	15	(Australia) Ellie Carpenter	(substituted off) 90+3'
DM	30	(United States) Celeste Boureille
DM	10	(United States) Lindsey Horan
AM	17	(United States) Tobin Heath
AM	12	(Canada) Christine Sinclair (c)
AM	7	(Switzerland) Ana-Maria Crnogorčević	(substituted off) 68'
FW	9	(Australia) Caitlin Foord
Substitutes:
GK	33	(United States) Britt Eckerstrom
DF	27	(United States) Elizabeth Ball
MF	8	(Brazil) Andressinha	(substituted in) 68'
FW	34	(United States) Tyler Lussi
FW	22	(United States) Ifeoma Onumonu
FW	23	(United States) Midge Purce	(substituted in) 90+3'
FW	26	(United States) Mallory Weber
Manager:
(England) Mark Parsons

NWSL Championship Most Valuable Player:
(United States) Jessica McDonald

Assistant referees:
Brooke Mayo (United States)
Adrienne McDonald (United States)
Fourth official:
Karen Abt (United States)

Match rules

- 90 minutes.
- 30 minutes of extra time if necessary.
- Penalty shootout if scores still level.
- Maximum of three substitutions.
