= 2014 NWSL Championship =

Women's soccer match in Washington, US

- Event: NWSL Championship
Seattle Reign FC	FC Kansas City
1	2
- Date: August 31, 2014
- Venue: Starfire Stadium, Tukwila, Washington, U.S.
- Most Valuable Player: Lauren Holiday (FC Kansas City)
- Referee: Margaret Domka
- Attendance: 4,252

The 2014 NWSL Championship was the second edition of the NWSL Championship, the championship match of the National Women's Soccer League (NWSL), and took place on August 31, 2014. FC Kansas City won 2–1 against NWSL Shield holders Seattle Reign FC, becoming NWSL champions for the first time. The match took place at Seattle's home Starfire Stadium in Tukwila, Washington.

== Road to the final ==
=== Seattle Reign FC ===
After missing the playoffs in the NWSL's inaugural season, Seattle Reign FC won the NWSL Shield in the 2014 season with the best record in the league. They were led by NWSL Most Valuable Player and NWSL Golden Boot winner Kim Little along with NWSL Team of the Year selections Jess Fishlock and Nahomi Kawasumi. In the playoff semifinals, a penalty scored by Little, a penalty saved by Hope Solo, and a goal scored by Megan Rapinoe gave the Reign a 2–1 win over the fourth seed Washington Spirit.

=== FC Kansas City ===
After sweeping the NWSL's inaugural major awards, FC Kansas City repeated their success in the 2014 season and again placed second in the league standings. They were led by returning NWSL Most Valuable Player Lauren Holiday, repeating NWSL Defender of the Year Becky Sauerbrunn, and NWSL Golden Boot runner-up Amy Rodriguez. In the playoff semifinals, a rematch from the previous year's playoffs, Rodriguez and Holiday each scored as Kansas City won 2–0 against the defending champion and third seed Portland Thorns FC.

== Match ==
=== Details ===
August 31, 2014
12:00pm PDT

Seattle Reign FC	1–2	FC Kansas City
Rapinoe 86'	Report	Rodriguez 23', 56'

Starfire Stadium, Tukwila, Washington
Attendance: 4,252
Referee: Margaret Domka

Seattle Reign FC	FC Kansas City

GK	1	(United States) Hope Solo	(yellow card) 90+3'
DF	14	(United States) Stephanie Cox
DF	3	(United States) Lauren Barnes
DF	13	(United States) Kendall Fletcher
DF	7	(United States) Elli Reed		(substituted off) 84'
MF	11	(United States) Keelin Winters
MF	8	(Scotland) Kim Little
MF	9	(Japan) Nahomi Kawasumi
MF	10	(Wales) Jess Fishlock
MF	15	(United States) Megan Rapinoe
FW	2	(United States) Sydney Leroux		(substituted off) 67'
Substitutes:
FW	17	(United States) Beverly Goebel		(substituted in) 67'
MF	20	(Samoa) Mariah Nogueira		(substituted in) 84'
Manager:
(United States) Laura Harvey

GK	18	(United States) Nicole Barnhart
DF	14	(United States) Kassey Kallman
DF	4	(United States) Becky Sauerbrunn
DF	13	(United States) Leigh Ann Robinson
DF	23	(Poland) Nikki Phillips
MF	6	(United States) Jen Buczkowski
MF	7	(United States) Jenna Richmond
MF	15	(United States) Erika Tymrak		(substituted off) 76'
FW	9	(United States) Merritt Mathias		(substituted off) 71'
FW	8	(United States) Amy Rodriguez		(substituted off) 64'
FW	12	(United States) Lauren Holiday
Substitutes:
FW	5	(United States) Liz Bogus		(substituted in) 76'
DF	17	(United States) Amy LePeilbet	(yellow card) 79'	(substituted in) 71'
FW	24	(United States) Sarah Hagen		(substituted in) 64'
Manager:
(North Macedonia) Vlatko Andonovski

Most Valuable Player:
(United States) Lauren Holiday

Assistant referees:
Marlene Duffy (United States)
Danielle Chesky (United States)
Fourth official:
Katja Koroleva (United States)

Match rules

- 90 minutes.
- 30 minutes of extra time if necessary.
- Penalty shootout if scores still level.
- Maximum of three substitutions.
