= NWSL Championship Most Valuable Player =

National Women's Soccer League award

2026 winner Vanessa DiBernardo

The NWSL Championship Most Valuable Player award is presented to the best player in the National Women's Soccer League (NWSL) Championship Game.

Tobin Heath received the first NWSL championship MVP award in 2013; she scored the opening goal of Portland Thorns FC's 2–0 victory in the inaugural championship game. In 2022, Portland's Sophia Smith received the championship MVP award the same season she was named league MVP. The most recent winner is Vanessa DiBernardo (2026).

== Winners ==
Year	Player	Position	Nationality	Club	Ref.
2013	Tobin Heath	Midfielder	United States	Portland Thorns FC	
2014	Lauren Holiday	Midfielder	United States	FC Kansas City	
2015	Amy Rodriguez	Forward	United States	FC Kansas City	
2016	Sabrina D'Angelo	Goalkeeper	Canada	Western New York Flash	
2017	Lindsey Horan	Midfielder	United States	Portland Thorns FC	
2018	Jessica McDonald	Forward	United States	North Carolina Courage	
2019	Debinha	Midfielder	Brazil	North Carolina Courage	
2021	Aubrey Bledsoe	Goalkeeper	United States	Washington Spirit	
2022	Sophia Smith	Forward	United States	Portland Thorns FC	
2023	Midge Purce	Forward	United States	NJ/NY Gotham FC	
2024	Barbra Banda	Forward	Zambia	Orlando Pride	
2025	Rose Lavelle	Midfielder	United States	Gotham FC	
2026	Vanessa DiBernardo	Midfielder	United States	Kansas City Current	

== Teams ==
Club	Won	Years won
Portland Thorns FC	3	2013, 2017, 2022
FC Kansas City	2	2014, 2015
Gotham FC	2	2023, 2025
North Carolina Courage	2	2018, 2019
Western New York Flash	1	2016
Washington Spirit	1	2021
Orlando Pride	1	2024

== See also ==
- NWSL Most Valuable Player
- List of NWSL awards
