= 2021 North Carolina Courage season =

North Carolina Courage's fifth season

North Carolina Courage
2021 season
- Managing owner: Steve Malik
- Chairman: Steve Malik
- Head Coach: Paul Riley (until September 30); Sean Nahas (interim; from September 30)
- Stadium: Sahlen's Stadium at WakeMed Soccer Park
- NWSL: 6th of 10
- NWSL Challenge Cup: 2nd of 5, East Division
- Top goalscorer: League: Lynn Williams (7); All: Lynn Williams (11)
- Highest home attendance: 7,064 (October 17 vs NJ/NY)
- Lowest home attendance: 2,300 (April 10 vs Washington)
- Average home league attendance: 4,986
- Biggest win: 5–0 (May 28 vs Louisville)
- Biggest defeat: 1–4 (October 10 vs Houston)
| Home colors | Away colors |

The 2021 North Carolina Courage season was the team's fifth season as a professional women's soccer team. North Carolina Courage plays in the National Women's Soccer League, the top tier of women's soccer in the United States.

== Background ==
North Carolina had finished the previous two regular seasons as champions of the National Women's Soccer League, along with winning the NWSL Shield by maintaining the league-best record in 2017, 2018, and 2019. The 2020 regular season was canceled due to the COVID-19 pandemic, and the team was eliminated in the quarter-final round of the 2020 Challenge Cup.

During the off-season, tennis star Naomi Osaka joined the team's ownership and the team unveiled new home and away kits.

== Competitive matches ==
=== Challenge Cup ===
==== Group stage ====
| April 10 | North Carolina Courage | 3–2 | Washington Spirit | Cary, North Carolina |
| 15:30 EDT | Hamilton 10'; McDonald 28'; Mathias 51' (yellow card) 90+7' | Report | Yokoyama 4'; Rodman 60'; Jacobs (yellow card) 63' | Stadium: WakeMed Soccer Park; Attendance: 2,300 |

| April 20 2 | NJ/NY Gotham FC | 4–3 | North Carolina Courage | Montclair, New Jersey |
| 18:00 EDT | Purce 18', 26'; Lloyd 32'; Cudjoe (yellow card) 86'; Viens 90+2' | Report | Debinha 22', 24'; McDonald 50' | Stadium: MSU Soccer Park at Pittser Field |

| April 26 3 | Racing Louisville FC | 2–3 | North Carolina Courage | Louisville, Kentucky |
| 18:00 EDT | Kizer 24'; Baucom 75' | Report | Pickett (yellow card) 12'; Hamilton 33'; Kurtz (yellow card) 49'; Debinha 57'; Ashley 84' (o.g.) | Stadium: Lynn Family Stadium; Attendance: 3,742 |

| May 1 4 | North Carolina Courage | 0–0 | Orlando Pride | Cary, North Carolina |
| 19:30 EDT | DeBree (yellow card) 2' | Report | | Stadium: WakeMed Soccer Park; Attendance: 2,426 |

==== Standings ====
| Pos | Team | Pld | W | D | L | GF | GA | GD | Pts | Qualification |
|---|---|---|---|---|---|---|---|---|---|---|
| 1 | NJ/NY Gotham FC | 4 | 2 | 2 | 0 | 5 | 3 | +2 | 8 | Qualification for the Championship |
| 2 | North Carolina Courage | 4 | 2 | 1 | 1 | 9 | 8 | +1 | 7 | |
| 3 | Orlando Pride | 4 | 1 | 2 | 1 | 3 | 3 | 0 | 5 | |
| 4 | Washington Spirit | 4 | 1 | 1 | 2 | 3 | 4 | −1 | 4 | |
| 5 | Racing Louisville FC | 4 | 0 | 2 | 2 | 4 | 6 | −2 | 2 | |

Source: NWSL
Rules for classification: Tiebreakers

=== Regular season ===
==== Matches ====
| May 15 1 | OL Reign | 0–0 | North Carolina Courage | Tacoma, Washington |
| 19:00 PDT | Balcer (yellow card) 83' | Report | Erceg (yellow card) 19'; Mathias (yellow card) 26' | Stadium: Cheney Stadium; Attendance: 2,104 |

| May 22 2 | North Carolina Courage | 1–2 | Orlando Pride | Cary, North Carolina |
| 19:00 EDT | Hamilton (yellow card) 39'; McDonald 89'; Pickett (yellow card) 90+7' | Report | Leroux 36'; Morgan 79'; Viggiano (yellow card) 83'; Petersen (yellow card) 89' | Stadium: WakeMed Soccer Park |

| May 28 3 | North Carolina Courage | 5–0 | Racing Louisville FC | Cary, North Carolina |
| 19:00 EDT | Erceg 7'; Mathias (yellow card) 56'; Williams 63'; Debinha 68'; Mace 75', 90' | Report | | Stadium: WakeMed Soccer Park |

| June 5 4 | Chicago Red Stars | 1–0 | North Carolina Courage | Bridgeview, Illinois |
| 13:00 CDT | Hill 29'; Woldmoe (yellow card) 88' | Report | | Stadium: SeatGeek Stadium |

| June 19 5 | North Carolina Courage | 2–1 | OL Reign | Cary, North Carolina |
| 16:00 EDT | McDonald 45'; Mewis 77' (yellow card) 88' | Report | Angelina (yellow card) 17'; Celia (yellow card) 73'; Fishlock 86' | Stadium: WakeMed Soccer Park; Attendance: 5,026 |

| June 23 6 | Racing Louisville FC | 0–2 | North Carolina Courage | Louisville, Kentucky |
| 19:30 EDT | Nagasato (yellow card) 65' | Report | Williams 27', 33' | Stadium: Lynn Family Stadium; Attendance: 6,334 |

| June 26 7 | North Carolina Courage | 2–0 | Portland Thorns FC | Cary, North Carolina |
| 19:00 EDT | Williams 57', 66' | Report | Ryan (yellow card) 78' | Stadium: WakeMed Soccer Park |

| July 4 8 | Orlando Pride | 0–2 | North Carolina Courage | Orlando, Florida |
| 18:00 EDT | | Report | Debinha 3'; Pickett (yellow card) 29'; Solaun 66'; Williams (yellow card) 90+1' | Stadium: Exploria Stadium; Attendance: 3,926 |

| July 10 9 | Washington Spirit | 2–0 | North Carolina Courage | Washington, D.C. |
| 19:00 EDT | Hatch 12', 45+1'; Sanchez (yellow card) 29'; Huster (yellow card) 77' | Report | Mathias (yellow card) 78'; DeBree (yellow card) 84'; O'Sullivan (yellow card) 88' | Stadium: Audi Field; Attendance: 4,929 |

| July 17 10 | North Carolina Courage | 1–2 | Houston Dash | Cary, North Carolina |
| 19:00 EDT | Hamilton 16'; Mathias (yellow card) 57'; O'Sullivan (yellow card) 61' | Report | Groom 9' (yellow card) 29'; Seiler 62' (yellow card) 69'; Visalli (yellow card) 90+5' | Stadium: WakeMed Soccer Park; Attendance: 5,229 |

| July 23 11 | Kansas City Current | 0–0 | North Carolina Courage | Kansas City, Kansas |
| 19:00 CDT | | Report | Rodriguez (yellow card) 55'; Speck (yellow card) 75' | Stadium: Legends Field |

| July 31 12 | North Carolina Courage | 1–1 | Orlando Pride | Cary, North Carolina |
| 19:00 EDT | Roccaro (yellow card) 39'; Ratcliffe 52' | Report | Krieger (yellow card) 16'; Strom (yellow card) 45'; Leroux 50' | Stadium: WakeMed Soccer Park; Attendance: 5,523 |

| August 7 13 | NJ/NY Gotham FC | 0–1 | North Carolina Courage | Harrison, New Jersey |
| 19:00 EDT | Zerboni (yellow card) 58' | Report | Speck 38' | Stadium: Red Bull Arena; Attendance: 2,179 |

| August 15 14 | North Carolina Courage | 1–0 | Chicago Red Stars | Cary, North Carolina |
| 18:45 EDT | Rodriguez 39' (pen.) | Report | Watt (yellow card) 87' | Stadium: WakeMed Soccer Park; Attendance: 5,002 |

| August 21 15 | North Carolina Courage | 4–0 | Kansas City Current | Cary, North Carolina |
| 19:00 EDT | Williams 12'; McDonald 21'; Solaun (yellow card) 40' (red card) 75'; Rodriguez 64'; Speck 90' | Report | McCain (yellow card) 44'; Pickett (yellow card) 47' | Stadium: WakeMed Soccer Park |

| August 29 16 | Washington Spirit | 0–0 | North Carolina Courage | Washington, D.C. |
| 17:00 EDT | Roddar (yellow card) 90+3' | Report | Williams (yellow card) 55' | Stadium: Audi Field; Attendance: 4,554 |

| September 5 17 | Kansas City Current | 0–0 | North Carolina Courage | Kansas City, Kansas |
| 18:00 CDT | Mace (yellow card) 20' | Report | Roccaro (yellow card) 26' | Stadium: Legends Field; Attendance: 4,583 |

| September 12 18 | North Carolina Courage | 0–1 | Portland Thorns FC | Cary, North Carolina |
| 15:00 EDT | Mathias (yellow card) 25'; Roccaro (yellow card) 30' | Report | Smith 57'; Moultrie (yellow card) 88' | Stadium: WakeMed Soccer Park; Attendance: 5,161 |

| September 25 19 | NJ/NY Gotham FC | 3–1 | North Carolina Courage | Harrison, New Jersey |
| 15:00 EDT | Onumonu (yellow card) 15'; Lloyd (yellow card) 18' (goal) 28' (pen.); Purce 36'; Dorsey (yellow card) 46'; Monaghan (yellow card) 77' (goal) 82'; Sheridan (yellow card) 85' | Report | James 20' (yellow card) 63'; Caldwell (yellow card) 40' | Stadium: Red Bull Arena; Attendance: 2,887 |

| October 6 20 | North Carolina Courage | 3–1 | Racing Louisville FC | Cary, North Carolina |
| 19:30 EDT | Williams 14'; Rodriguez 19'; Debinha 30' | Report | McCaskill 24' | Stadium: WakeMed Soccer Park; Attendance: 3,523 |

| October 10 21 | Houston Dash | 4–1 | North Carolina Courage | Houston, Texas |
| 18:00 CDT | Visalli 6'; Montefusco (yellow card) 19'; Daly 24', 57'; Groom 26' | Report | McDonald 4'; Erceg (yellow card) 66' | Stadium: PNC Stadium; Attendance: 4,155 |

| October 13 22 | North Carolina Courage | 1–2 | Washington Spirit | Cary, North Carolina |
| 19:30 EDT | Kurtz (yellow card) 31'; Speck 60' | Report | Rodman 39'; Roddar 70' | Stadium: WakeMed Soccer Park; Attendance: 3,742 |

| October 17 23 | North Carolina Courage | 0–3 | NJ/NY Gotham FC | Cary, North Carolina |
| 14:00 EDT | Mathias (yellow card) 45+2' | Report | Purce 54', 64'; Lloyd 67'; Thiney (yellow card) 83' | Stadium: WakeMed Soccer Park; Attendance: 7,064 |

| October 30 24 | Portland Thorns FC | 0–0 | North Carolina Courage | Portland, Oregon |
| 19:00 PDT | | Report | | Stadium: Providence Park; Attendance: 17,584 |

Color key: Green = North Carolina win; Yellow = draw; Red = opponents win.

==== Standings ====
| Pos | Team | Pld | W | D | L | GF | GA | GD | Pts | Qualification |
|---|---|---|---|---|---|---|---|---|---|---|
| 1 | Portland Thorns FC | 24 | 13 | 5 | 6 | 33 | 17 | +16 | 44 | NWSL Shield |
| 2 | OL Reign | 24 | 13 | 3 | 8 | 37 | 24 | +13 | 42 | Playoffs – Semi-finals |
| 3 | Washington Spirit (C) | 24 | 11 | 6 | 7 | 29 | 26 | +3 | 39 | Playoffs – First round |
| 4 | Chicago Red Stars | 24 | 11 | 5 | 8 | 28 | 28 | 0 | 38 | Playoffs – First round |
| 5 | NJ/NY Gotham FC | 24 | 8 | 11 | 5 | 29 | 21 | +8 | 35 | Playoffs – First round |
| 6 | North Carolina Courage | 24 | 9 | 6 | 9 | 28 | 23 | +5 | 33 | Playoffs – First round |
| 7 | Houston Dash | 24 | 9 | 5 | 10 | 31 | 31 | 0 | 32 | |
| 8 | Orlando Pride | 24 | 7 | 7 | 10 | 27 | 32 | −5 | 28 | |
| 9 | Racing Louisville FC | 24 | 5 | 7 | 12 | 21 | 40 | −19 | 22 | |
| 10 | Kansas City | 24 | 3 | 7 | 14 | 15 | 36 | −21 | 16 | |

Source: NWSL
Rules for classification: Tiebreakers
(C) Champions

=== Playoffs ===
| November 7 First round | Washington Spirit | 1–0 (a.e.t.) | North Carolina Courage | Washington, D.C. |
| 17:30 EST | Hatch 113' | Report | | Stadium: Audi Field; Attendance: 5,379; Referee: Natalie Simon |

== See also ==
- 2021 in association football
