= 2022 NWSL Championship =

Women's soccer match in Washington, US

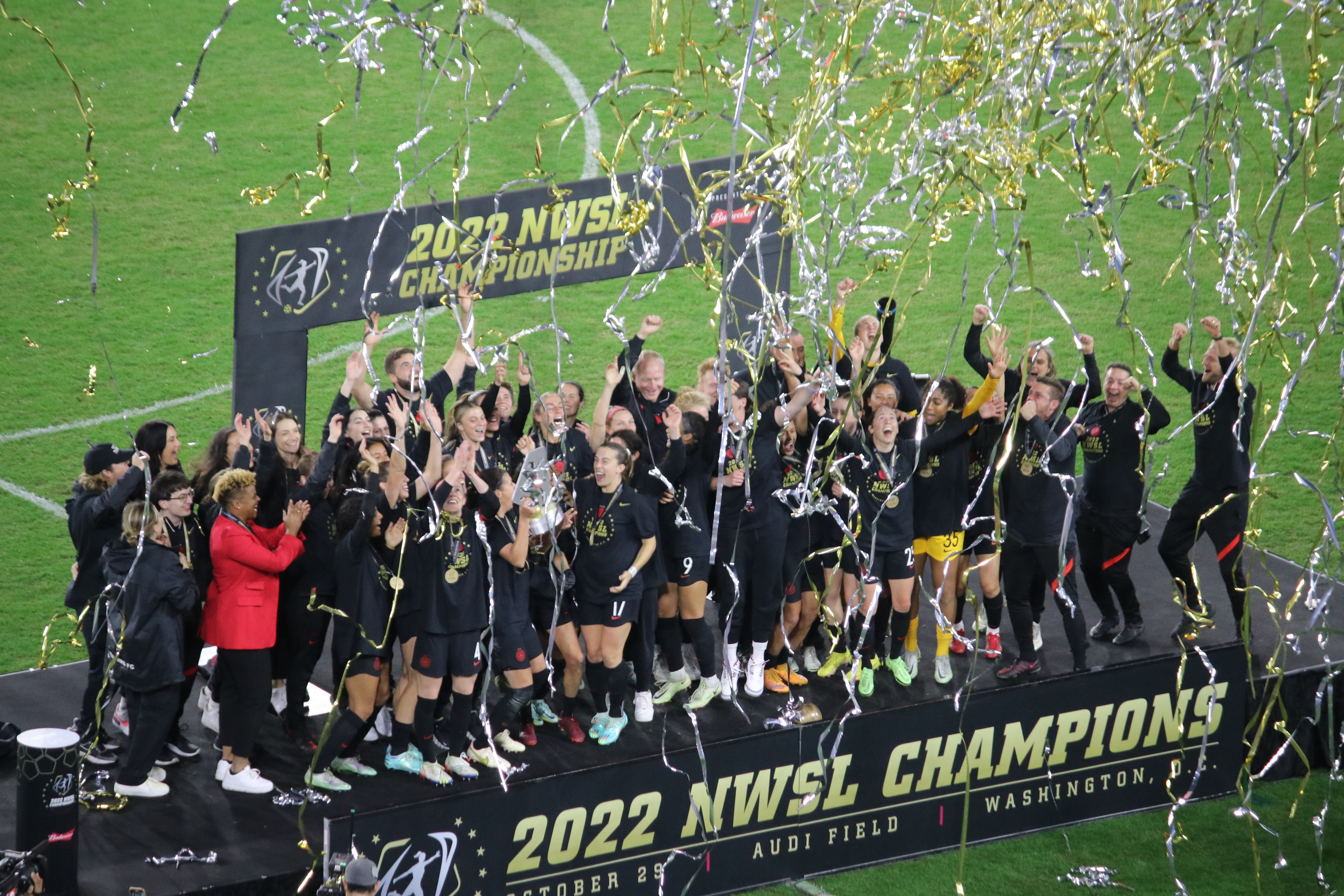
- Thorns celebrating the win
- Event: NWSL Championship
Portland Thorns FC	Kansas City Current
2	0
- Date: October 29, 2022
- Venue: Audi Field, Washington, D.C., U.S.
- Most Valuable Player: Sophia Smith (Portland Thorns FC)
- Referee: Natalie Simon
- Attendance: 17,624

The 2022 NWSL Championship was the ninth edition of the NWSL Championship, the championship match of the National Women's Soccer League (NWSL), and took place on October 29, 2022. Portland Thorns FC won 2–0 against the Kansas City Current, becoming NWSL champions for a record third time. The match was played at Audi Field in Washington, D.C.

== Road to the final ==
=== Portland Thorns FC ===
After winning the NWSL Shield the previous year, Portland Thorns FC placed second in the 2022 regular-season standings. They were led by NWSL Most Valuable Player Sophia Smith, the league's second-highest scorer, and NWSL Best XI midfielder Sam Coffey. The Thorns entered the playoffs in the semifinals against the third seed and expansion team San Diego Wave FC. In the game, Portland's Rocky Rodríguez cancelled out Alex Morgan's early goal before new mother Crystal Dunn scored the 2–1 stoppage-time game winner, sending the Thorns to their fourth NWSL final.

=== Kansas City Current ===
After a bottom-of-the-table finish in their expansion year, the Kansas City Current rose to fifth place in the 2022 regular season. In the first round of the playoffs, NWSL Best XI midfielder Lo'eau LaBonta converted an early penalty for the Current before Kate Del Fava scored the 2–1 stoppage-time winner against the fourth seed Houston Dash, the playoff debut for both teams. In the semifinals, Alex Loera and Kristen Hamilton each scored as Kansas City won 2–0 over the NWSL Shield champion OL Reign, advancing the Current to their first NWSL final.

== Match ==
=== Details ===
October 29, 2022
8:00pm EDT

Portland Thorns FC	2–0	Kansas City Current
Smith 4'; Merrick 56' (o.g.)

Audi Field
Washington, D.C.
Attendance: 17,624
Referee: Natalie Simon

Portland Thorns FC	Kansas City Current

GK	1	(United States) Bella Bixby
LB	25	(United States) Meghan Klingenberg
CB	4	(United States) Becky Sauerbrunn
CB	20	(United States) Kelli Hubly
LB	14	(Finland) Natalia Kuikka
LM	11	(Costa Rica) Rocky Rodríguez	(substituted off) 63'
CM	17	(United States) Sam Coffey
RM	12	(Canada) Christine Sinclair (c)	(substituted off) 73'
LW	17	(United States) Morgan Weaver	(substituted off) 63'
FW	9	(United States) Sophia Smith
RW	23	(United States) Yazmeen Ryan	(substituted off) 90+3'
Substitutes:
GK	35	(United States) Abby Smith
DF	5	(United States) Emily Menges
MF	8	(Japan) Hina Sugita	(substituted on) 63'
RW	13	(United States) Olivia Moultrie	(substituted on) 90+3'
FW	16	(Canada) Janine Beckie	(substituted on) 63'
MF	19	(United States) Crystal Dunn	(substituted on) 73'
DF	29	(United States) Tegan McGrady
DF	39	(United States) Meaghan Nally
MF	46	(United States) Taylor Porter
Manager:
(Canada) Rhian Wilkinson

GK	21	(United States) Adrianna Franch
CB	3	(United States) Kristen Edmonds
CB	7	(United States) Elizabeth Ball
CB	26	(United States) Addisyn Merrick	(substituted off) 64'
LM	4	(United States) Hailie Mace
CM	11	(Canada) Desiree Scott (c)	(substituted off) 75'
CM	22	(United States) Alex Loera
RM	8	(United States) Kate Del Fava
LW	25	(United States) Kristen Hamilton
FW	10	(United States) Lo'eau LaBonta
RW	5	(United States) Cece Kizer
Substitutes:
GK	31	(Jamaica) Sydney Schneider
GK	38	(United States) Cassie Miller
MF	14	(United States) Chardonnay Curran
DF	18	(United States) Izzy Rodriguez	(substituted on) 75'
DF	19	(United States) Jenna Winebrenner
FW	23	(United States) Elyse Bennett	(substituted on) 64'
DF	24	(United States) Taylor Leach
MF	28	(United States) Addie McCain
MF	66	(Australia) Chloe Logarzo
Manager:
(England) Paul Riley

Most Valuable Player:
(United States) Sophia Smith

Assistant referees:
Kali Smith (United States)
Alicia Messer (United States)
Fourth official:
Danielle Chesky (United States)

Match rules

- 90 minutes.
- 30 minutes of extra time if necessary.
- Penalty shootout if scores still level.
- Maximum of five substitutions.
