= Katelyn Rowland =

American soccer player (born 1994)

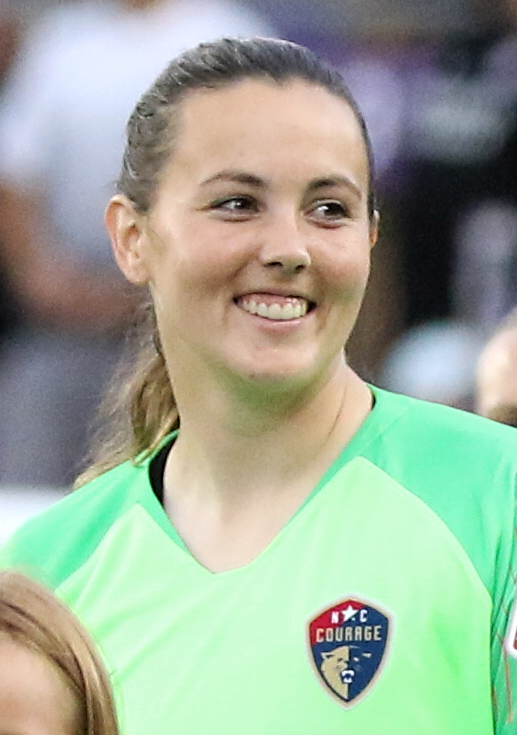
- Rowland with the North Carolina Courage in 2018

Personal information
- Full name: Katelyn Morgan Rowland
- Date of birth: March 16, 1994 (age 32)
- Place of birth: Walnut Creek, California, United States
- Height: 1.80 m (5 ft 11 in)
- Position: Goalkeeper

Team information
- Current team: North Carolina Courage (goalkeeper coach)

College career
Years	Team	Apps	(Gls)
2011–2014	UCLA Bruins	90	(0)

Senior career*
Years	Team	Apps	(Gls)
2015–2016	FC Kansas City	3	(0)
2016	Western New York Flash	6	(0)
2016–2017	→ Newcastle Jets (loan)	8	(0)
2017–2021	North Carolina Courage	30	(0)
2021	Kansas City	4	(0)
2022–2023	North Carolina Courage	6	(0)
2024	Bay FC	20	(0)

International career^{‡}
2013–2014	United States U20	4	(0)
2015–2017	United States U23		

Managerial career
- 2025: North Carolina Courage (asst. goalkeeper coach)
- 2026–: North Carolina Courage (goalkeeper coach)
- * Club domestic league appearances and goals as of November 10, 2024 ‡ National team caps and goals as of May 25, 2015

Katelyn Morgan Rowland (born March 16, 1994) is an American professional soccer coach and former player who is the goalkeeper coach for the North Carolina Courage of the National Women's Soccer League (NWSL). She played as a goalkeeper in the NWSL for ten seasons.

Rowland played college soccer for the UCLA Bruins, winning the 2013 national championship, and was drafted by FC Kansas City in the second round of the 2015 NWSL College Draft. She also played for the Western New York Flash, Newcastle Jets, North Carolina Courage, Kansas City Current, and Bay FC. She achieved her greatest success during two stints with the Courage, collecting three NWSL Shields, two NWSL Championships, and two NWSL Challenge Cups, and being named to the NWSL Second XI in 2017. She also won league titles with FC Kansas City and the Western New York Flash. She represented the United States at the under-20 and under-23 levels, appearing at the 2014 FIFA U-20 Women's World Cup.

== Early life ==
Born in Walnut Creek, California, Rowland attended Vacaville Christian High School where she played on the varsity basketball and volleyball teams and earned all-league honors in both sports. She played club soccer for San Juan and helped the team win a national championship in 2008. At the tournament, she was awarded the Golden Gloves Award. The same year, Top Drawer Soccer named her a "Player to Watch".

=== UCLA Bruins, 2011–2014 ===
Rowland attended the University of California, Los Angeles where she played for the UCLA Bruins women's soccer team from 2011 to 2014. As a freshman, she was the starting goalkeeper in 20 of 21 matches and finished the year with a 13–1–4 record. Rowland was named to the Pac-12 All-Freshman Team and ranked second in the Pac-12 in shutouts (10), shutouts per game (0.50) and goals against average (0.61). During her sophomore year, she led the Pac-12 in shutouts (11) and shutouts per game (0.55). Her 0.57 goals against average (GAA) ranked second in the Pac-12 conference and 13th across the nation. She finished the season with a 17–3 record, tallied 46 saves, and allowed 11 goals. She earned Pac-12 second-team all-conference and honorable mention all-academic team honors. As a junior in 2013, Rowland's goals against average (GAA) of 0.27 and her save percentage of .903 led goalkeepers across the country. Her 15 shutouts set a school record and her 22 wins tied the school record for wins in a season. Rowland ranked second on UCLA's career charts with 52 wins and 36 shutouts. She was named to Soccer America's MVP team and to the NSCAA All-Pacific Region first-team UCLA won the school's first NCAA Women's Soccer championship, the College Cup, in 2013.

As a senior, Rowland played every minute and set new school records for goals against average (GAA) with 0.245, consecutive shutouts (10) and consecutive shutout minutes (969). She set NCAA records for career shutouts (55) and single-season shutouts (19). As a goalkeeper, Rowland tallied two assists during consecutive games in the NCAA tournament. She finished her first year with the Bruins with a 21–1–2 record. She tallied 49 saves and allowed six goals (a school record). Rowland was named the Pac-12 Conference Goalkeeper of the Year and was named to the MAC Hermann Trophy Watch List.

== Club career ==
=== FC Kansas City, 2015–2016 ===
In January 2015, Rowland was selected by FC Kansas City as the 17th overall pick in second round of the 2015 NWSL College Draft. As a backup keeper to Nicole Barnhart, Rowland played three matches for the Blues and recorded a 1.33 goals against average (GAA). FC Kansas City won the 2015 NWSL Championship.

=== Western New York Flash, 2016 ===
Rowland was traded to the Western New York Flash in June 2016. Kansas City general manager, Huw Williams noted that the trade would provide Rowland with "an opportunity to compete for immediate playing time. It also provides us with more options in the strong 2017 college draft." Rowland made six appearances for the Flash. After finishing the regular season in fourth place with a 9–6–5 record, the team advanced to the playoffs where they defeated the Portland Thorns 4–3 in extra time. The Flash defeated the Washington Spirit in penalty kicks during the NWSL championship final to win their first NWSL title.

==== Newcastle Jets, 2016–2017 ====
Rowland played on loan for the Newcastle Jets in the Australian W-League during the 2016–17 W-League season. She arrived at the Jets as an injury replacement for Kelsey Wys.

=== North Carolina Courage, 2017–2021 ===
In January 2017, it was announced that the Western New York Flash has been sold to the ownership group of the Carolina Railhawks. The team re-located to Cary, North Carolina and was renamed North Carolina Courage. Rowland was named to the 2017 NWSL Second XI and nominated for NWSL Goalkeeper of the Year.

In the 2018 NWSL season, Rowland started 18 games for North Carolina. She recorded 8 clean sheets, helping the Courage win their second straight NWSL Shield. In the play-offs, Rowland didn't play in the semi-final as she was recovering from a concussion, but returned to play in the NWSL Championship game. She recorded 3 saves, as the Courage defeated the Portland Thorns 3–0 to win the 2018 NWSL Championship.

=== Kansas City Current, 2021-2022 ===
On July 22, 2021, the Kansas City Current (then KC NWSL) acquired Rowland in a trade with the North Carolina Courage. Kansas City acquired Rowland and teammates Hailie Mace and Kristen Hamilton in exchange for Amy Rodriguez and $60,000 in allocation money.

=== Return to North Carolina Courage, 2022–2023 ===
After appearing in 4 games for the Current, Rowland was traded back to the North Carolina Courage along with $200,000 in allocation money and a first round pick in the 2023 NWSL Draft in exchange for Lynn Williams.

=== Bay FC, 2024 ===
Rowland was selected by NWSL expansion team Bay FC in the 2024 NWSL expansion draft.

Rowland was poised to return as Bay FC's starter in the 2025 season. On February 12, 2025, during preseason training, Bay FC announced Rowland's retirement from professional soccer.

== International career ==
Rowland has represented the United States on the under-15, under-17, under-20, and under-23 national teams. In 2014, she was the starting goalkeeper at the 2014 FIFA U-20 Women's World Cup and 2014 CONCACAF Women's U-20 Championship tournaments and was awarded the Golden Glove award at the CONCACAF Championship after tallying four shutouts.

== Coaching career ==
Upon her retirement, Rowland joined the North Carolina Courage as an assistant goalkeeping coach in March 2025. In 2026, following Sean Nahas and Nathan Thackeray's departures, she was named the head goalkeeping coach under new head coach Mak Lind.

== Honors and awards ==
UCLA Bruins

- NCAA Division I women's soccer tournament: 2013
- Pac-12 Conference: 2013, 2014

FC Kansas City

- NWSL Championship: 2015

Western New York Flash

- NWSL Championship: 2016

North Carolina Courage

- NWSL Championship: 2018, 2019; runner-up: 2017
- NWSL Shield: 2017, 2018, 2019
- NWSL Challenge Cup: 2022, 2023

Individual

- NWSL Second XI: 2017
- Second-team All-American: 2013, 2014
- Pac-12 Goalkeeper of the Year: 2014
- First-team All-Pac-12: 2013, 2014
- Second-team All-Pac-12: 2012
