= Lauren Holiday Impact Award =

Annual award in US women's soccer

2026 winner Savy King

The Lauren Holiday Impact Award is presented annually by the National Women's Soccer League (NWSL) honoring a player's "outstanding service and character off the pitch".

== Winners ==
Season	Player	Nationality	Club	Ref
2024	Jen Beattie	Scotland	Bay FC	
2025	Sam Hiatt	United States	Portland Thorns FC	
2026	Savy King	United States	Angel City FC	

== See also ==
- List of sports awards honoring women
- NWSL Players' Awards
- NWSL awards
- Women's soccer in the United States
