= NWSL awards =

Annual recognition awarded by the National Women's Soccer League

The National Women's Soccer League (NWSL) presents six annual awards to individual players. The Golden Boot award is presented to the top scorer at the end of the regular season, while the Most Valuable Player, Defender of the Year, Goalkeeper of the Year, Rookie of the Year, and Coach of the Year awards are voted on by various league constituents. As of 2025, the NWSL's individual end-of-year awards are voted upon in two rounds: in the first round, players (50%), owners/general managers/coaches (25%), and media (25%) vote to determine the nominees; in the second round, players (40%), owners/general managers/coaches (25%), media (25%), and fans (10%) vote among the nominees to determine the winner.

In addition, the league also presents two teams of the season awards, the NWSL Best XI and the NWSL Second XI, to individual players. As of 2024, the teams of the season awards are voted on by players (40%), owners/general managers/coaches (25%), media (25%), and fans (10%). Voters for the teams of the season awards are required to name one goalkeeper, four defenders, and a combination of six midfielders and forwards.

== List of awards ==
=== Annual awards ===
- NWSL Most Valuable Player
- NWSL Golden Boot
- NWSL Midfielder of the Year
- NWSL Defender of the Year
- NWSL Goalkeeper of the Year
- NWSL Rookie of the Year
- NWSL Coach of the Year
- NWSL Best XI and Second XI
- Lauren Holiday Impact Award

=== Monthly awards ===
- NWSL Team of the Month
- NWSL Rookie of the Month
- NWSL Player of the Month

=== Weekly awards ===
- NWSL Player of the Week
- NWSL Goal of the Week
- NWSL Save of the Week

== See also ==
- List of sports awards honoring women
- NWSL Players' Awards
- NWSL records and statistics
- List of NWSL drafts
- Women's soccer in the United States
