= 2015 Western New York Flash season =

Western New York Flash
2015 Western New York Flash season
- President: Alexandra Sahlen
- Head coach: Aaran Lines
- Stadium: Sahlen's Stadium
- Top goalscorer: League: Sam Mewis (3); Lynn Williams (3); All: Sam Mewis (8)
- Highest home attendance: 2,514 (June 6 vs. Chicago)
- Lowest home attendance: 1,802 (May 8 vs. Kansas City)
- Average home league attendance: 2,128
Home colors	Away colors

The 2015 season was Western New York Flash's eighth season of existence, and the third in which they competed in the National Women's Soccer League, the top division of women's soccer in the United States.

== First-team squad ==
Note: Flags indicate national team as defined under FIFA eligibility rules; some limited exceptions apply. Players may hold more than one non-FIFA nationality.

No.	Pos.	Nation	Player
1	GK	CAN	Sabrina D'Angelo
3	DF	USA	Whitney Engen
4	MF	USA	Abby Dahlkemper
5	MF	USA	Samantha Mewis
6	MF	USA	Jordan Angeli
7	MF	USA	Amanda Frisbie
9	FW	USA	Lynn Williams
10	FW	DEN	Camilla Kur Larsen
11	FW	CMR	Ajara Nchout Njoya
12	DF	USA	Kristen Edmonds

No.	Pos.	Nation	Player
13	DF	USA	Brittany Taylor
14	MF	USA	Becky Edwards
15	FW	USA	Jasmyne Spencer
16	DF	USA	Jaelene Hinkle
17	FW	USA	Kristen Hamilton
18	GK	USA	Chantel Jones
19	DF	USA	Chelsea Stewart
22	FW	USA	Sydney Leroux
23	DF	USA	Toni Pressley

== Match results ==
=== Pre-season ===
March 14, Sat 1	Western New York Flash	4–0	West Virginia Mountaineers	Elma, New York
10:30 EDT UTC-4	Mewis 44'; Edmonds 53'; Spencer 61'; Williams 69'	Report		Stadium: Sahlen Sports Park

March 28, Sat 2	Western New York Flash	8–1	Syracuse Orange	Elma, New York
10:30 EDT UTC-4	Pressley 10'; 34' (o.g.); Spencer 40'; Angeli 45+'; Edmonds 50'; Mewis 52', 74'; Nchout 90'	Report	Street 62'; Pitts (yellow card) 70'	Stadium: Sahlen Sports Park

April 4, Sat 3	Penn State Nittany Lions	0–5	Western New York Flash	Altoona, Pennsylvania
11:00 EDT UTC-4		Report	Kur Larsen 27'; Hamilton 60', 75'; Mewis 67', 87'	Stadium: Spring Run Stadium

=== Regular season ===
April 12, Sun 1	Seattle Reign FC	5–1	Western New York Flash	Seattle, Washington
19:00 EDT UTC-4	Fishlock 25'; Yanez 53'; Rapinoe 71', 74', 86'	Boxscore; Report	Angeli (yellow card) 57' (goal) 68'	Stadium: Memorial Stadium; Attendance: 2,642; Referee: Christina Unkel

April 18, Sat 2	Portland Thorns FC	1–0	Western New York Flash	Portland, Oregon
19:00 EDT UTC-4	Long 22'; Wilkinson (yellow card) 74'	Report		Stadium: Providence Park; Attendance: 13,148; Referee: Karen Abt

May 2, Sat 3	Western New York Flash	3–1	Boston Breakers	Rochester, New York
19:00 EDT UTC-4	Mewis 23' (Edwards); Edwards 62' (Williams); Edmonds (yellow card) 74'; Leroux 88' (Dahlkemper)	Report	Marlborough 15' (McCaffrey)	Stadium: Sahlen's Stadium; Attendance: 1,837

May 8, Fri 4	Western New York Flash	0–1	FC Kansas City	Rochester, New York
19:00 EDT UTC-4		Report	Buczkowski (yellow card) 33'; Bogus 73'	Stadium: Sahlen's Stadium; Attendance: 1,802

May 14, Thu 5	FC Kansas City	0–0	Western New York Flash	Kansas City, Missouri
20:00 EDT UTC-4	Bogus (yellow card) 15'; Hagen (yellow card) 48+'; Groom (yellow card) 57'	Report	Taylor (yellow card) 36'; Edwards (yellow card) 69'; Jones (yellow card) 84'; Williams (yellow card) 86'	Stadium: Swope Soccer Village; Attendance: 1,847

May 23, Sat 6	Western New York Flash	3–2	Washington Spirit	Rochester, New York
19:00 EDT UTC-4	Williams 11' (Spencer); Mewis 35' (Edwards); Spencer 57' (Edmonds); Mewis (yellow card) 60'	Report	Nairn 22' (penalty); Oyster (yellow card) 32'; Dunn 55' (Nairn); Nairn (yellow card) 63'	Stadium: Sahlen's Stadium; Attendance: 2,110

June 6, Sat 7	Western New York Flash	3–1	Chicago Red Stars	Rochester, New York
19:00 EDT UTC-4	S Mewis 51' (Eddy); Eddy 72' (Williams); Fields 75' (unassisted); S Mewis (yellow card) 85'	Report	Lomnicki (yellow card) 57'; Huerta 93+' (DiBernardo)	Stadium: Sahlen's Stadium; Attendance: 2,514

June 20, Sat 8	Houston Dash	2–0	Western New York Flash	Houston
20:30 EDT UTC-4	McDonald 39'; Ohai 63'; Masar (yellow card) 74'	WNY Report; NWSL Report		Stadium: BBVA Compass Stadium; Attendance: 3,499; Referee: Ekaterina Koroleva

June 28, Sun 9	Boston Breakers	0–2	Western New York Flash	Boston
17:00 EDT UTC-4	Pathman (yellow card) 29'; Evans (yellow card) 31'	WNY Report; NWSL Report	Williams 19'; Eddy 42'	Stadium: Soldiers Field Soccer Stadium; Attendance: 2,011; Referee: Farhad Dadhko

July 3, Fri 10	Western New York Flash	1–1	Seattle Reign FC	Rochester, New York
19:00 EDT UTC-4	Williams 81'	NWSL Report	Little 55' (pen.)	Stadium: Sahlen's Stadium; Attendance: 2,377

July 11, Sat 11	Seattle Reign FC	4–2	Western New York Flash	Seattle
22:00 EDT UTC-4	Yanez 49' (Barnes); Corsie 52' (unassisted); Brooks 55' (Fletcher); Fishlock 73' (Yanez)	Report	Frisbie 34' (Mewis); Edwards 67' (Hinkle); Edwards (yellow card) 89'	Stadium: Memorial Stadium; Attendance: 5,778; Referee: Brandon Artis

July 19, Sun 12	Western New York Flash	3–3	Sky Blue FC	Rochester, New York
15:00 EDT UTC-4	Spencer 2' Hinkle 25' Heyman 50'		Nadim 39' Freels 60' Pearce 62'	Stadium: Sahlen's Stadium

July 25, Sat 13	Western New York Flash	0–1	Houston Dash	Rochester, New York
19:00 EDT UTC-4			Lloyd 49'	Stadium: Sahlen's Stadium

July 29, Wed 14	Western New York Flash	0–2	Portland Thorns FC	Rochester, New York
19:00 EDT UTC-4			Sinclair 62' Long 80'	Stadium: Sahlen's Stadium

August 1, Sat 15	Sky Blue FC	1–2	Western New York Flash	Piscataway, New Jersey
19:00 EDT UTC-4	O'Hara 52'		Andrade 35' Eddy 89'	Stadium: Yurcak Field

August 8, Sat 16	FC Kansas City	4–0	Western New York Flash	Kansas City, Missouri
20:00 EDT UTC-4	Robinson 39' (Laddish); Averbuch 69' (unassisted); O'Reilly 84' (Rodriguez); Buczkowski 87' (Silva)	Report	Dahlkemper (yellow card) 65'	Stadium: Swope Soccer Village; Attendance: 3,086

August 12, Wed 17	Washington Spirit	1–1	Western New York Flash	Germantown, Maryland
19:00 EDT UTC-4	Matheson 16'		Williams 80'	Stadium: Maureen Hendricks Field Maryland SoccerPlex

August 23, Sun 18	Chicago Red Stars	0–0	Western New York Flash	Lisle, Illinois
17:00 EDT UTC-4				Stadium: Village of Lisle-Benedictine University Sports Complex

August 29, Sat 19	Western New York Flash	0–2	Chicago Red Stars	Rochester, New York
19:00 EDT UTC-4			Press 40' Hoy 65'	Stadium: Sahlen's Stadium

September 4, Fri 20	Western New York Flash	3–2	Portland Thorns FC	Rochester, New York
19:00 EDT UTC-4	Ayinde 5' Spencer 8' Mewis 24'		Taylor 85' Long 90+2'	Stadium: Sahlen's Stadium

=== Standings ===
Pos	Team	Pld	W	D	L	GF	GA	GD	Pts	Qualification
1	Seattle Reign FC	20	13	4	3	41	21	+20	43	NWSL Shield
2	Chicago Red Stars	20	8	9	3	31	22	+9	33	NWSL Playoffs
3	FC Kansas City (C)	20	9	5	6	32	20	+12	32	NWSL Playoffs
4	Washington Spirit	20	8	6	6	31	28	+3	30	NWSL Playoffs
5	Houston Dash	20	6	6	8	21	26	−5	24	
6	Portland Thorns FC	20	6	5	9	27	29	−2	23	
7	Western New York Flash	20	6	5	9	24	34	−10	23	
8	Sky Blue FC	20	5	7	8	22	28	−6	22	
9	Boston Breakers	20	4	3	13	22	43	−21	15	

Source: NWSL
Rules for classification: Tiebreakers
(C) Champions

==== Results summary ====
Overall								Home						Away					
Pld	Pts	W	L	T	GF	GA	GD	W	L	T	GF	GA	GD	W	L	T	GF	GA	GD
20	23	6	9	5	24	34	−10	4	4	2	16	16	0	2	5	3	8	18	−10

Last updated: September 26, 2014
Source: National Women's Soccer League
Pld = Matches played; Pts = Points; W = Matches won; T = Matches tied; L = Matches lost; GF = Goals for; GA = Goals against; GD = Goal difference

==== Results by round ====
Round	1	2	3	4	5	6	7	8	9	10	11	12	13	14	15	16	17	18	19	20
Stadium	A	A	H	H	A	H	H	A	A	H	A	H	H	H	A	A	A	A	H	H
Result	L	L	W	L	D	W	W	L	W	D	L	D	L	L	W	L	D	D	L	W

Updated to match(es) played on September 26, 2015. Source: National Women's Soccer League
A = Away; H = Home; W = Win; D = Draw; L = Loss

== Squad statistics ==
Source: NWSL

Key to positions: FW – Forward, MF – Midfielder, DF – Defender, GK – Goalkeeper

N	Pos	Player	GP	GS	Min	G	A	WG	Shot	SOG	Cro	CK	Off	Foul	FS	YC	RC
98	FW	Lady Andrade	6	4	328	1	0	0	7	4	0	4	1	4	5	0	0
6	MF	Jordan Angeli	3	0	63	1	0	0	2	2	0	0	0	2	0	1	0
99	MF	Halimatu Ayinde	8	4	388	1	0	0	5	1	0	0	2	3	3	0	0
4	MF	Abby Dahlkemper	20	20	1784	0	1	0	8	1	1	0	0	10	5	1	0
20	MF	Elizabeth Eddy	15	4	664	3	2	2	13	9	3	11	1	6	4	0	0
12	DF	Kristen Edmonds	11	10	850	0	1	0	5	2	1	8	0	7	4	1	0
14	MF	Becky Edwards	20	20	1800	2	3	1	13	7	8	68	1	20	12	2	0
3	DF	Whitney Engen	12	12	1080	0	0	0	0	0	0	0	0	0	3	0	0
24	FW	Jamia Fields	10	7	582	1	0	0	11	5	0	0	1	9	3	0	0
7	MF	Amanda Frisbie	4	2	169	1	0	0	2	1	1	0	0	3	2	0	0
17	FW	Kristen Hamilton	11	3	313	0	0	0	5	3	0	0	1	7	1	0	0
23	MF	Michelle Heyman	9	9	798	1	1	0	15	13	1	0	11	11	2	0	0
16	DF	Jaelene Hinkle	20	20	1800	1	1	0	11	3	3	5	0	8	8	0	0
10	FW	Camilla Kur Larsen	3	1	57	0	0	0	2	1	0	0	0	0	0	0	0
22	FW	Sydney Leroux	3	3	269	1	0	0	6	1	0	0	0	3	1	0	0
5	MF	Samantha Mewis	20	20	1685	4	4	1	55	27	1	1	0	22	10	2	0
11	FW	Ajara Nchout	7	1	128	0	0	0	3	1	0	0	0	1	1	0	0
8	MF	Ashley Nick	13	7	610	0	1	0	2	0	0	0	0	4	2	0	0
(Note: Number 23 was later assigned to Michelle Heyman)23	DF	Toni Pressley	1	1	90	0	0	0	0	0	0	0	0	1	1	0	0
15	FW	Jasmyne Spencer	20	19	1596	3	1	1	33	17	0	1	4	15	18	1	0
19	DF	Chelsea Stewart	3	2	150	0	0	0	3	0	0	0	0	1	0	0	0
13	DF	Brittany Taylor	18	18	1620	0	0	0	2	2	1	0	0	11	2	2	0
9	FW	Lynn Williams	17	13	1176	4	4	1	26	16	1	1	6	8	5	1	0

N	Pos	Goal keeper	GP	GS	Min	W	L	T	Shot	SOG	Sav	GA	GA/G	Pen	PKF	SO
1	GK	Sabrina D'Angelo	7	7	555	1	5	0	57	35	24	11	1.571	0	2	0
39	GK	Robyn Horner	1	1	90	1	0	0	7	7	5	2	2	1	1	0
18	GK	Chantel Jones	13	12	1155	4	4	5	150	81	60	21	1.615	1	2	2

== See also ==
- 2015 National Women's Soccer League season
