= Kaleigh Kurtz =

American soccer player (born 1994)

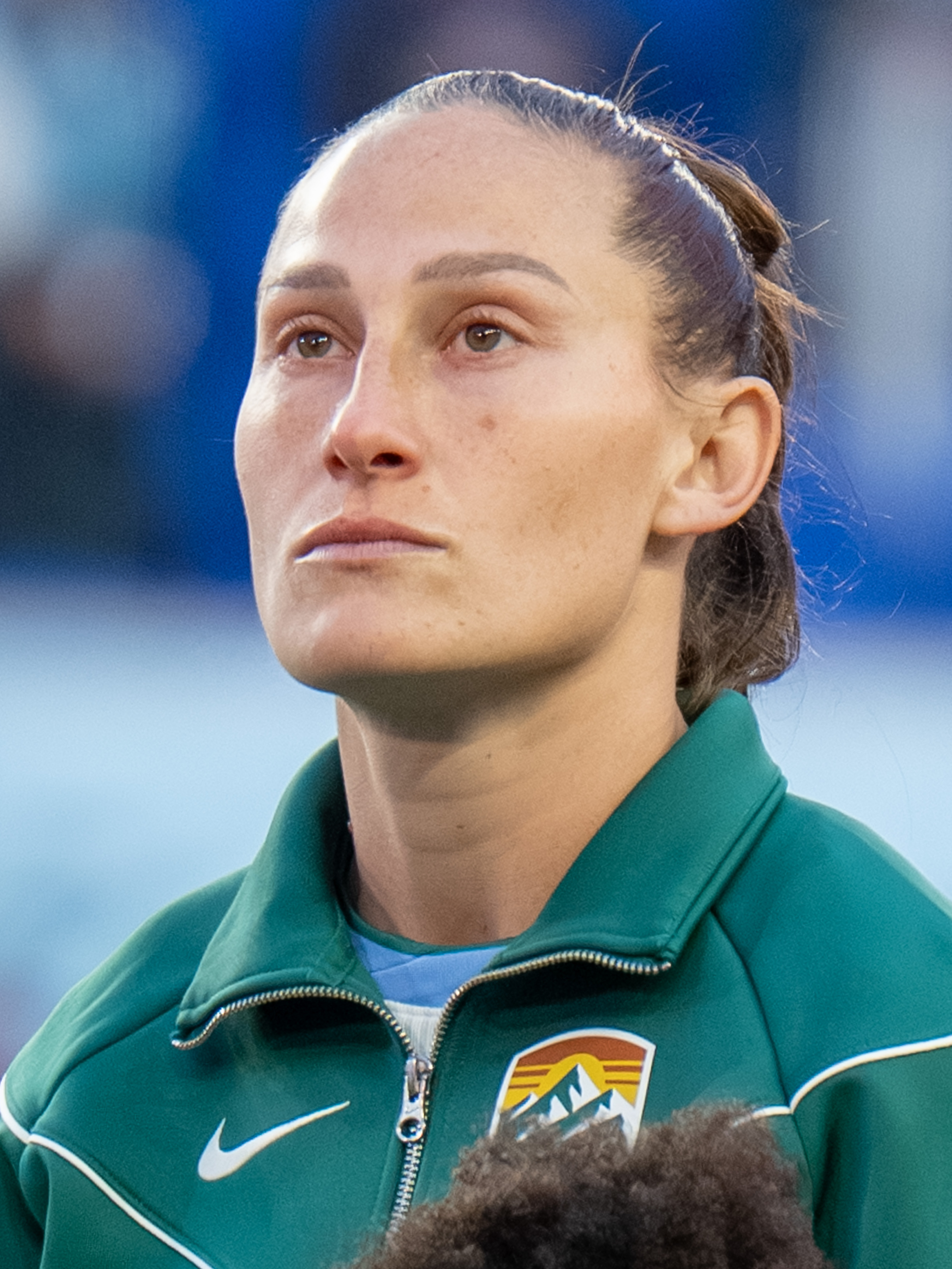
- Kurtz with the Denver Summit in 2026

Personal information
- Full name: Kaleigh Nicole Kurtz
- Date of birth: September 9, 1994 (age 32)
- Place of birth: Greer, South Carolina, United States
- Height: 1.73 m (5 ft 8 in)
- Position: Center back

Team information
- Current team: Denver Summit
- Number: 3

Youth career
- 2004-2012: Carolina Elite Soccer Academy
- 2009–2012: Riverside High School

College career
Years	Team	Apps	(Gls)
2013	Richmond Spiders	18	(0)
2014–2016	South Carolina Gamecocks	69	(2)

Senior career*
Years	Team	Apps	(Gls)
2017	Östersunds DFF	12	(0)
2018–2025	North Carolina Courage	132	(5)
2019–2020	→ Canberra United (loan)	11	(0)
2026–	Denver Summit	30	(1)
- * Club domestic league appearances and goals as of 06:38, November 8, 2026 (UTC)

Kaleigh Nicole Kurtz (born September 9, 1994) is an American professional soccer player who plays as a center back for Denver Summit FC of the National Women's Soccer League (NWSL). She holds the NWSL records for consecutive games started and consecutive minutes played.

Kurtz played college soccer for the Richmond Spiders and the South Carolina Gamecocks, earning first-team All-American honors in 2016. After one season with Swedish club Östersunds DFF, she joined the North Carolina Courage in 2018, winning two NWSL Shields and two NWSL Championships in her first two seasons. After becoming a starter in 2021, she logged a record four consecutive iron woman seasons and helped win two NWSL Challenge Cup titles. She has been named to the NWSL Best XI twice, including a first-team selection in 2024.

== Early life and college career ==
Kurtz grew up in Greer, South Carolina. She started playing soccer at the age of four in her local YMCA league, switching to Carolina Elite Soccer Academy at age nine. She played other competitive sports growing up, including swimming and running. In soccer she has almost always played the position of defender, specifically center back. She attended high school at Riverside High School, where she was a three-year all-State winner. Going into her junior year of high school, Kurtz broke her femur which ultimately affected her college recruiting prospects.

Kurtz spent her first year of college soccer at the University of Richmond in 2013, starting 18 games. After that season, she transferred to the University of South Carolina. Kurtz made 69 appearances for the Gamecocks. South Carolina reached the quarterfinals of the NCAA tournament in 2014 and 2016. In her senior year in 2016, she was named a First Team NSCAA All-American, the SEC Defensive Player of the Year, and a MAC Herman Trophy Semifinalist.

== Club career ==
=== Östersunds DFF ===
Following college, Kurtz played for Östersunds DFF in the Swedish Elitettan, fulfilling her desire to play overseas. She made 12 appearances and captained the side.

=== North Carolina Courage ===
==== 2018–2019 ====
Kurtz was a non-roster invitee during the 2018 Carolina preseason. She signed with the Courage in March 2018. She debuted on April 18, 2018, starting at center back against the OL Reign. She made six appearances in the 2018 regular season, as well as two in the 2018 Women's International Champions Cup. Kurtz's option for 2019 was picked up in October 2018.

==== Canberra United (loan), 2019–2020 ====
Kurtz spent the NWSL offseason of 2019–2020 in the Australian W-League playing in the capital for Canberra United, on loan from the North Carolina Courage. She played every minute in the 12-game season for Canberra. During round 6, Kurtz broke her nose in the run of play having to come off shortly to get fully bandaged in order to stop the bleeding, and then competing in the final minutes of the game. She was later named to the round 6 Team of the Week. She tallied one assist during her time in Australia and led the league in clearances with a total of 69 clearances during the regular season. Kurtz capped off her time in Canberra by receiving the 2019/2020 Canberra United Player of the Year award.

==== 2021–2025 ====
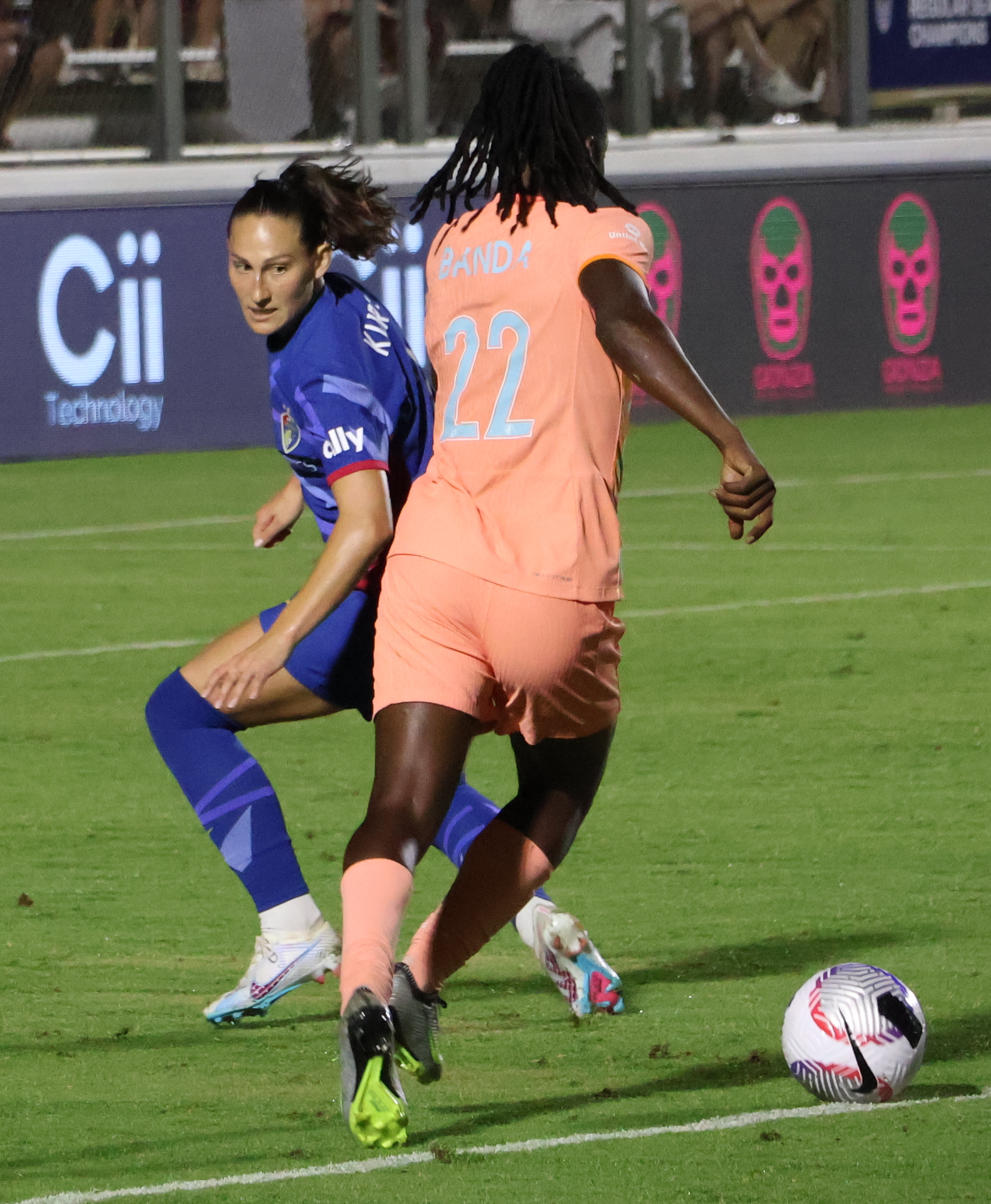
Kurtz defending Barbra Banda in 2024

Following the departure of Abby Dahlkemper, Kurtz became one of the Courage's starting center backs alongside Abby Erceg in the 2021 season.

Kurtz played every minute of the regular season in 2022, becoming an iron woman for the first time. Following the 2022 season, she signed a new three-year contract with the Courage.

Kurtz continued her iron woman streak through the 2023 season and ranked second in the NWSL in blocks (22). She was named to the NWSL Second XI and nominated for NWSL Defender of the Year.

Kurtz broke the NWSL regular-season consecutive minutes record on May 24, 2024, passing Amber Brooks's mark of 6,493 minutes. She accumulated four yellow cards with eight games left in the 2024 season, meaning that one more card would result in a suspension; she managed not just to complete her third consecutive iron woman season without a card but did not commit a single foul in that span.

On April 26, 2025, Kurtz scored a 90th-minute equalizer against the Kansas City Current. Ashley Sanchez scored in stoppage time to give the Courage a 3–2 comeback win against the league leaders, the Courage's first win of the season. On June 15, she marked her 100th consecutive start in a 2–1 win over Angel City FC, becoming the first NWSL player to reach that mark with a single club. She wore the captain's armband for much of the later part of the season with Denise O'Sullivan injured. On September 6, she set an NWSL record with her 107th consecutive start, passing Sam Staab. She completed her fourth consecutive iron woman season in 2025, also an NWSL record. On November 12, the Courage announced that Kurtz would not re-sign with the club as a free agent.

=== Denver Summit ===
On November 13, 2025, NWSL expansion team Denver Summit announced that they had signed Kurtz to a three-year contract.

== Honors and awards ==
North Carolina Courage

- NWSL Champions: 2018, 2019
- NWSL Shield: 2018, 2019
- Women's International Champions Cup Winner: 2018
- NWSL Challenge Cup: 2022, 2023

Individual

- NWSL Best XI Second Team: 2023
- NWSL Best XI First Team: 2024
- Canberra United Player of the Year: 2019/2020
- SEC Defender of the Year: 2016
- First Team NSCAA All-American: 2016
- First Team NSCAA Scholar All-American: 2016

== Career statistics ==
=== College ===
Club	Season	Apps	Goals
Richmond	2013	18	0
South Carolina	2014	25	0
South Carolina	2015	20	1
South Carolina	2016	24	1
Career totals		87	2

=== Club ===
As of August 8, 2026

Appearances and goals by club, season and competition
Club	Season	League			Cup (Note: Includes NWSL Challenge Cup)		Playoffs (Note: Includes NWSL playoffs and W-League Finals series)		Other (Note: Includes NWSL Fall Series and NWSL x Liga MX Femenil Summer Cup)		Total	
Club	Season	Division	Apps	Goals	Apps	Goals	Apps	Goals	Apps	Goals	Apps	Goals
Östersunds DFF	2017	Elitettan	12	0	—		—		—		12	0
North Carolina Courage	2018	NWSL	6	0	—		0	0	—		6	0
North Carolina Courage	2019	NWSL	9	0	—		0	0	—		9	0
North Carolina Courage	2020	NWSL	—		1	0	—		3	0	4	0
North Carolina Courage	2021	NWSL	21	0	4	0	1	0	—		26	0
North Carolina Courage	2022	NWSL	22	3	8	0	—		—		30	3
North Carolina Courage	2023	NWSL	22	0	6	0	1	0	—		29	0
North Carolina Courage	2024	NWSL	26	1	—		1	0	4	0	31	1
North Carolina Courage	2025	NWSL	26	1	—		—		—		26	1
Denver Summit FC	2026	NWSL	18	0	—		—		—		18	0
Canberra United FC	2019–20	W-League	12	0	—		—		—		12	0
Career total			174	5	19	0	3	0	7	0	203	5
