= Meredith Speck =

American soccer player (born 1993)

- Speck with Gotham FC in 2026

Personal information
- Full name: Meredith Madeline Speck
- Date of birth: February 1, 1993 (age 33)
- Place of birth: Rockville Centre, New York, United States
- Height: 5 ft 3 in (1.60 m)
- Position: Midfielder

Team information
- Current team: Gotham FC
- Number: 25

Youth career
- 2006–2013: Albertson Fury

College career
Years	Team	Apps	(Gls)
2011–2014	Yale Bulldogs	56	(7)

Senior career*
Years	Team	Apps	(Gls)
2015	Västerås BK30		
2016	Western New York Flash	6	(0)
2017–2025	North Carolina Courage	100	(8)
2026–	Gotham FC	2	(0)
- * Club domestic league appearances and goals as of November 1, 2026

Meredith Madeline Speck (born February 1, 1993) is an American professional soccer player who plays as a midfielder for Gotham FC of the National Women's Soccer League (NWSL). She spent the majority of her career with the North Carolina Courage, winning two NWSL Championships, three NWSL Shields, and two NWSL Challenge Cups. She was the last remaining Courage player from their Western New York Flash days, where she won her first NWSL Championship in 2016. She played college soccer for the Yale Bulldogs.

== Early life ==
Speck grew up in a soccer family in Rockville Centre, New York, on Long Island. She was coached by both her parents and has two older sisters who played college soccer. She attended Sacred Heart Academy, leading the team to the New York state championship in 2008, and became team captain in her senior year. She played ECNL club soccer for Albertson Fury under her future NWSL head coach Paul Riley.

== College career ==
Speck played college soccer for the Yale Bulldogs, where she recorded 7 goals and 15 assists in 56 appearances from 2011 to 2014. She became team captain and was named to the Ivy League all-conference team three times. While in college, she was selected to the United States under-23 team for a series of friendlies in Norway, but did not play due to a collarbone injury.

== Club career ==
=== Early career ===
Speck trained with the NWSL's Portland Thorns in the 2015 preseason. In August 2015, she signed her first professional contract with Västerås BK30 in Sweden's third-tier Division 1.

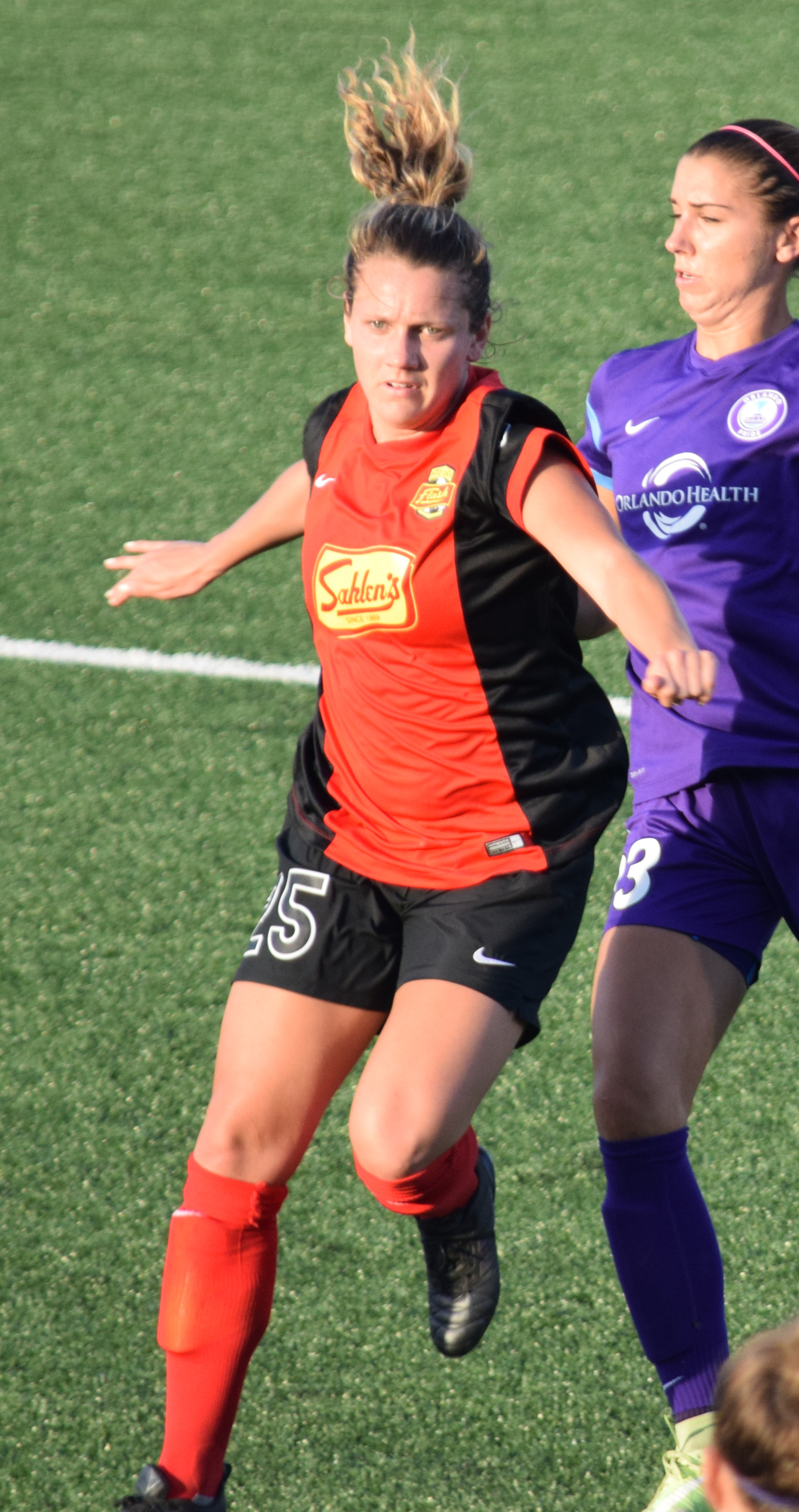
Speck playing for the Flash in 2016

After a season in Sweden, Speck returned to the United States and joined the NWSL's Western New York Flash in the 2016 preseason. On April 23, the club announced that they had signed Speck to the active roster, and she made her NWSL debut the same day, playing the entire match in a 1–0 loss to the Chicago Red Stars. She was the first Yale Bulldog to play in the NWSL. She played in six total games that season. She was unused in the playoffs as Western New York won the NWSL Championship, defeating the Washington Spirit on penalties.

=== North Carolina Courage ===
In January 2017, the Flash were bought by new ownership and relocated to become the North Carolina Courage. During their first three seasons in North Carolina, the Courage were the team to beat in the NWSL, winning three consecutive NWSL Shields and two NWSL Championships (2018 and 2019). In those early years, Speck played a limited role on the field but had an impact in training and the locker room, with Sean Nahas commenting: "She's a massive glue piece for us ... She's a true pro, and I say that because for five years she never saw the field, but [she] never complained".

On August 7, 2021, Speck scored her first NWSL goal in a 1–0 win over NJ/NY Gotham FC. On November 7, she made her NWSL playoff debut as a second-half substitute for Amy Rodriguez in a 1–0 overtime loss to the Washington Spirit in the first round.

On May 7, 2022, Speck played the last few minutes in the NWSL Challenge Cup final, seeing out a 2–1 win over the Washington Spirit. Later that month, on May 18, she captained the Courage for the first time against the Orlando Pride. On December 12, following a season in which the Courage missed the playoffs for the first time, Speck signed a two-year contract extension with the club.

Speck became part of the Courage's regular lineup for the first time in 2023. On June 24, she tore her anterior cruciate ligament (ACL) playing against Racing Louisville and missed the rest of the season.

On March 5, 2024, Speck signed a one-year contract extension to stay with the Courage through 2025. On May 17, she made her return from injury in a 1–0 home win over the Utah Royals. In July, she posted three assists as the Courage topped their group in NWSL x Liga MX Femenil Summer Cup and was named to the NWSL Team of the Month for the first time.

On August 22, 2025, Speck made her 100th regular-season appearance in the NWSL, marking the occasion with an assist to Jaedyn Shaw in a 3–3 draw with the Chicago Stars.

=== Gotham FC ===
On August 6, 2026, it was announced that Speck had signed with reigning NWSL champions Gotham FC through the end of the season.

== Personal life ==
Speck previously dated her North Carolina Courage teammate Debinha.

== Honors and awards ==
Western New York Flash

- NWSL Championship: 2016

North Carolina Courage

- NWSL Championship: 2018, 2019
- NWSL Shield: 2017, 2018, 2019
- NWSL Challenge Cup: 2022, 2023

Gotham FC

- NWSL Shield: 2026

Individual

- First-team All-Ivy League: 2011, 2013, 2014
