= NWSL Defender of the Year =

Annual award in US women's soccer

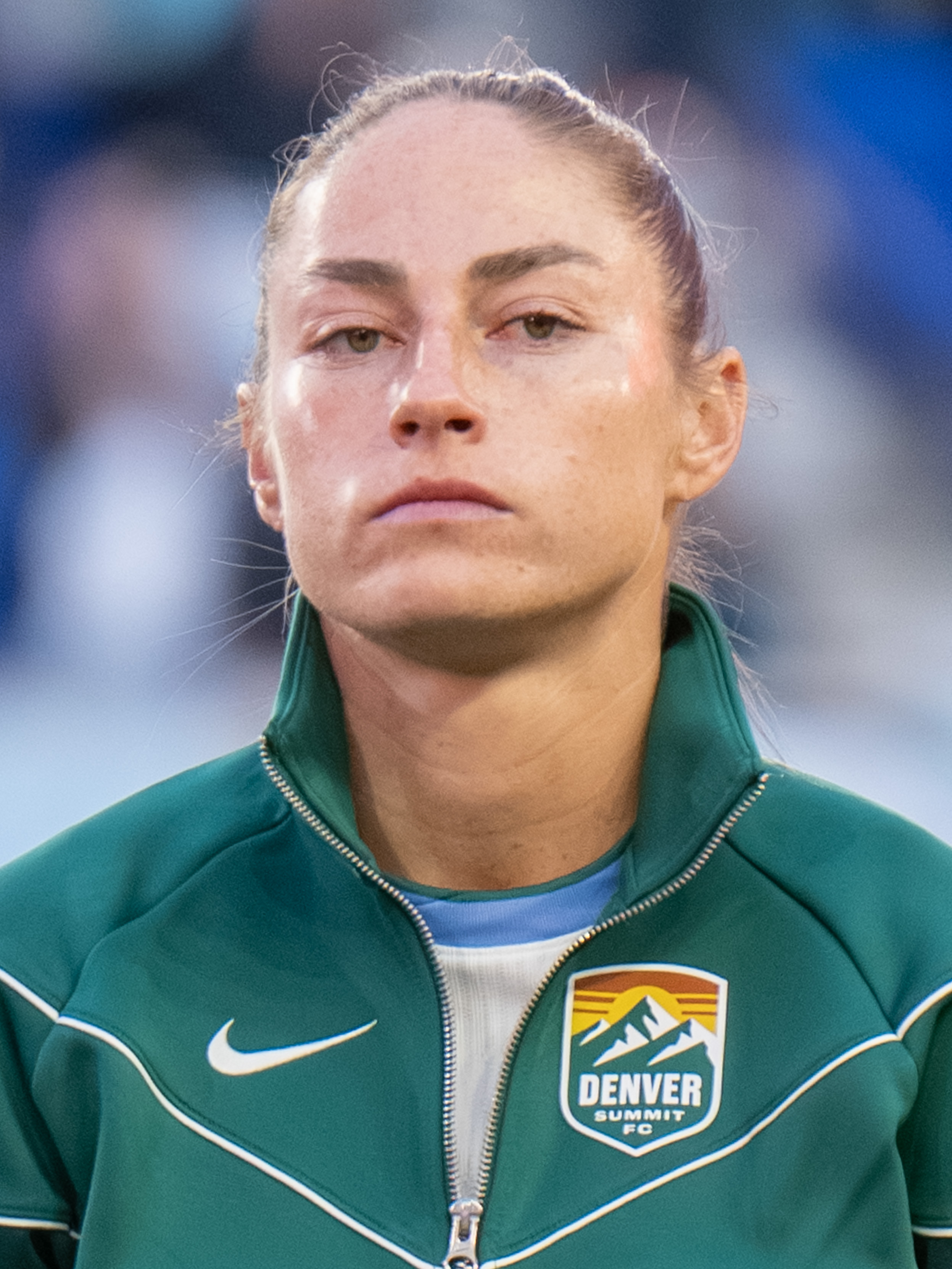
2026 winner Janine Sonis

The NWSL Defender of the Year award is presented annually to the best defensive player in the National Women's Soccer League (NWSL).

Becky Sauerbrunn won the first three Defender of the Year awards from 2013 to 2015 and added her fourth in 2019. The most recent winner is Janine Sonis (2026).

As of 2025, the NWSL's individual end-of-year awards are voted upon in two rounds: in the first round, players (50%), owners/general managers/coaches (25%), and media (25%) vote to determine the nominees; in the second round, players (40%), owners/general managers/coaches (25%), media (25%), and fans (10%) vote among the nominees to determine the winner.

== Winners ==
Season	Player	Nationality	Club	Other finalists	Ref.
2013	Becky Sauerbrunn	United States	FC Kansas City	Christie Rampone, Leigh Ann Robinson	
2014	Becky Sauerbrunn (2)	United States	FC Kansas City	Ali Krieger, Julie Johnston	
2015	Becky Sauerbrunn (3)	United States	FC Kansas City	Lauren Barnes, Kendall Fletcher, Julie Johnston, Amy LePeilbet	
2016	Lauren Barnes	United States	Seattle Reign FC	Arin Gilliland, Julie Johnston, Emily Menges, Becky Sauerbrunn	
2017	Abby Dahlkemper	United States	North Carolina Courage	Steph Catley, Ali Krieger, Becky Sauerbrunn, Casey Short	
2018	Abby Erceg	New Zealand	North Carolina Courage	Abby Dahlkemper, Julie Ertz, Becky Sauerbrunn, Emily Sonnett	
2019	Becky Sauerbrunn (4)	United States	Utah Royals FC	Casey Short, Lauren Barnes, Abby Erceg, Jaelene Hinkle	
2020	2020 regular season cancelled due COVID-19 pandemic				
2021	Caprice Dydasco	United States	NJ/NY Gotham FC	Sarah Gorden, Emily Menges, Carson Pickett, Alana Cook	
2022	Naomi Girma	United States	San Diego Wave FC	Alana Cook, Sofia Huerta, Carson Pickett, Becky Sauerbrunn	
2023	Naomi Girma (2)	United States	San Diego Wave FC	Sarah Gorden, Ali Krieger, Kaleigh Kurtz, Sam Staab	
2024	Emily Sams	United States	Orlando Pride	Kaleigh Kurtz, Tara McKeown, Naomi Girma, Kylie Strom	
2025	Tara McKeown	United States	Washington Spirit	Jordyn Bugg, Avery Patterson, Izzy Rodriguez, Kayla Sharples	
2026	Janine Sonis	Canada	Denver Summit FC	Tierna Davidson, Kate Del Fava, Sarah Gorden, Kennedy Wesley	

== Wins by team ==
Club	Wins
FC Kansas City	3
North Carolina Courage	2
San Diego Wave FC	2
Denver Summit FC	1
NJ/NY Gotham FC	1
Orlando Pride	1
Seattle Reign FC	1
Utah Royals	1
Washington Spirit	1

== Wins by nationality ==
Nationality	Wins
United States	11
Canada	1
New Zealand	1

== See also ==
- List of sports awards honoring women
- NWSL Players' Awards
- NWSL awards
- NWSL records and statistics
- Women's soccer in the United States
