= Jaelene Daniels =

American soccer player (born 1993)

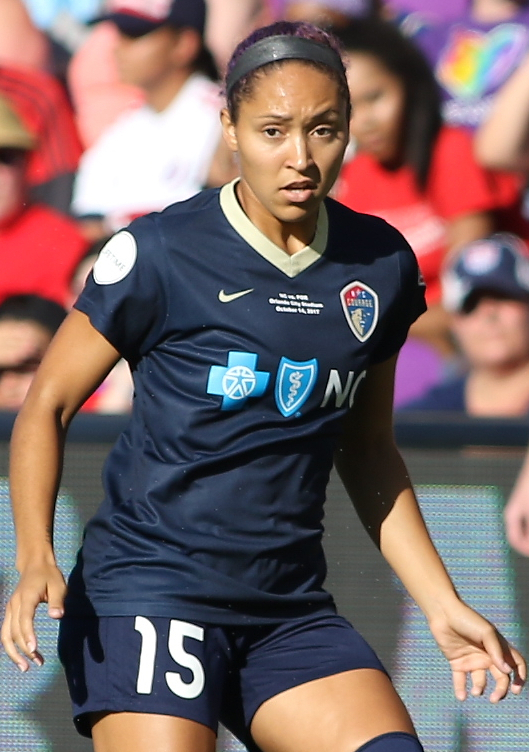
- Daniels with the North Carolina Courage in 2017

Personal information
- Full name: Jaelene McKenzie Daniels
- Birth name: Jaelene McKenzie Hinkle
- Date of birth: May 28, 1993 (age 33)
- Place of birth: Denver, Colorado, United States
- Height: 5 ft 4 in (1.63 m)
- Position: Defender

College career
Years	Team	Apps	(Gls)
2011–2014	Texas Tech Red Raiders	84	(1)

Senior career*
Years	Team	Apps	(Gls)
2015–2016	Western New York Flash	35	(2)
2017–2020	North Carolina Courage	64	(1)
2022	North Carolina Courage	19	(1)

International career^{‡}
2010	United States U17		
2013–2015	United States U23		
2015–2016	United States	8	(0)
- * Club domestic league appearances and goals as of February 16, 2023 ‡ National team caps and goals as of February 15, 2016

Jaelene McKenzie Daniels (née Hinkle; born May 28, 1993) is an American professional soccer defender.

== Early life ==
Daniels attended Valor Christian High School in Highlands Ranch, Colorado (a suburb of Denver) where she played soccer and basketball. In 2009, she was awarded the league's Player of the Year and was named to the all-conference team, first team all-state and All-Colorado team by The Denver Post. During her senior year in 2010, she was the league's top scorer and named to the all-conference team, first team all-state and All-Colorado team by the newspaper for the second consecutive year. The same year, she received Parade All-American honors.

Daniels played club soccer for Real Colorado for four years and captained the team during the 2010–11 season. She helped the team win the state championship in 2007. She was a member of the Olympic Development Program (ODP) team that advanced to the regional championship in 2006.

== Club career ==
=== Western New York Flash, 2015–2016 ===
Daniels was selected seventh overall during the 2015 NWSL College Draft by the Western New York Flash. During her first season with the team, she started in all 20 matches and scored a goal while playing in the defender position. The Flash finished in seventh place during the regular season with a 6–9–5 record.

Daniels played in 15 games and scored one goal during the 2016 NWSL season. She was in the starting lineup for the Flash in their semi-final game against the Portland Thorns. Western New York secured an upset victory over the Shield winners. Daniels was once again in the starting lineup for the Championship Game. The game went to penalties, she converted her penalty, helping the Flash win the 2016 NWSL Championship.

=== North Carolina Courage, 2017–2020 ===
In January 2017, the Flash were sold and relocated to North Carolina and re-branded as the North Carolina Courage. Daniels started in 22 games for the Courage in 2017. North Carolina won the 2017 NWSL Shield, but lost in the NWSL Championship game 1–0 to Portland.

Daniels was named to the NWSL Team of the Month for March and April 2018. She was an important part of North Carolina's backline which broke the record for fewest goals conceded, and won the NWSL Shield for the second straight year. She played every minute of North Carolina's play-offs games, as the Courage won the 2018 NWSL Championship. Following the Courage's 2019 NWSL Championship season, Daniels and teammate Abby Erceg were nominated for NWSL Defender of the Year.

On November 4, 2020, Daniels announced her retirement from soccer.

=== Return from retirement ===
On December 19, 2021, North Carolina Courage announced they have signed Daniels on a one-year deal, with an additional one-year option, marking her return from retirement. The signing was widely scrutinized at the time, leading the Courage to release a statement defending it.

On October 17, 2022, the Courage announced that they had declined their contract option on Daniels for the 2023 season, making her a free agent.

== International career ==
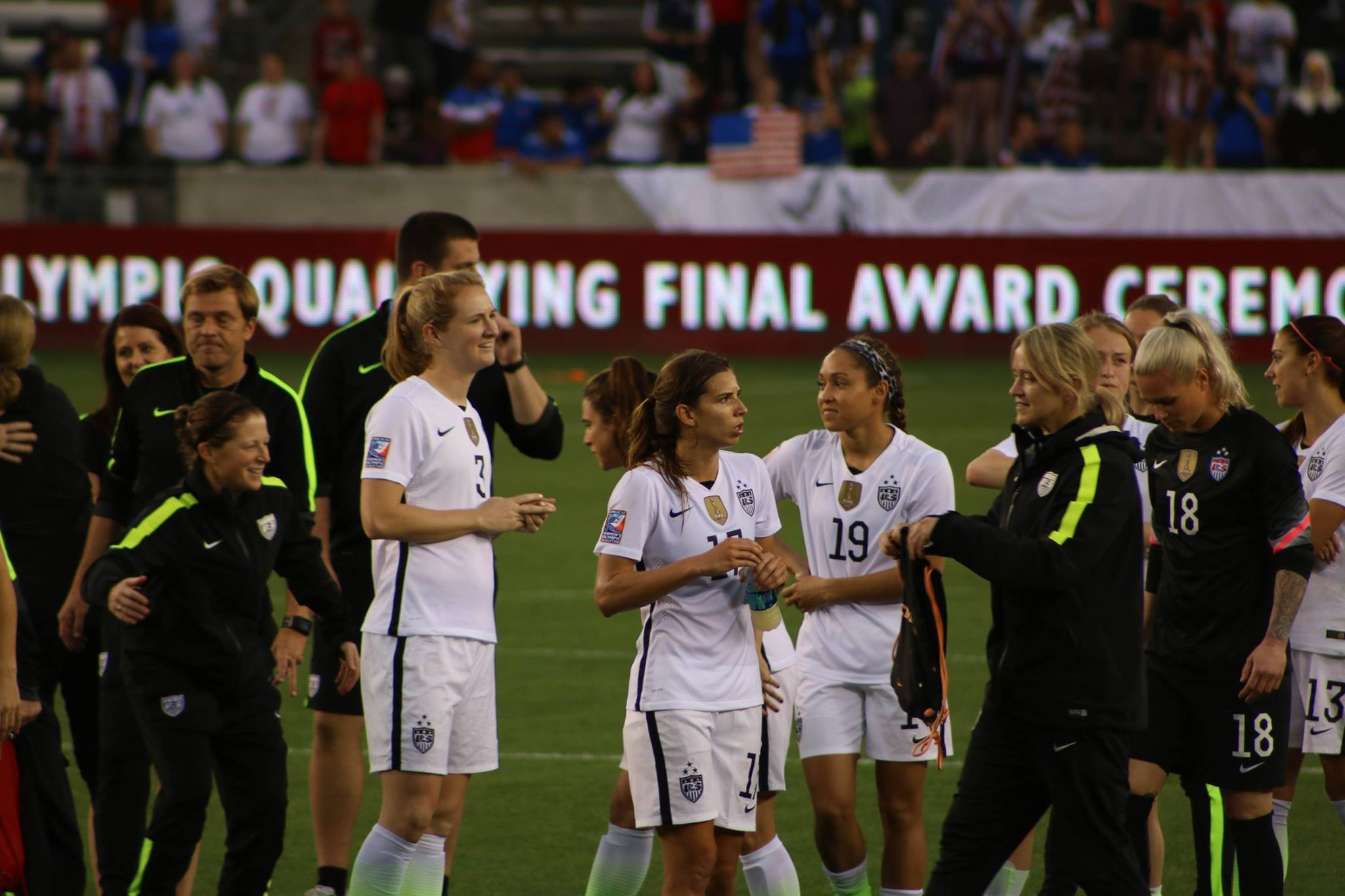
Daniels (19) with the United States women's national soccer team, January 2017

In October 2015, Daniels was called into camp for the senior national team in preparation for games against Brazil during the team's victory tour following their win at the 2015 FIFA Women's World Cup in Canada. She earned her first cap with the national team during a friendly match against Brazil in Seattle on October 21 which resulted in a 1–1 tie.

In 2016 Daniels was named to the roster for the 2016 CONCACAF Women's Olympic Qualifying Championship, she appeared in three games for the U.S., as they won the tournament and qualified for the 2016 Summer Olympics. She was also called up for the 2016 SheBelieves Cup but did not appear in any games. The U.S. won the inaugural edition of the SheBelieves Cup.

In June 2017, Daniels was called into camp for international friendlies against Sweden and Norway but did not attend, citing "personal reasons."

In a May 2018 interview with The 700 Club, Daniels revealed that she withdrew from the team for the June 2017 friendlies because she did not want to wear the US Soccer jerseys honoring LGBT Pride Month, saying "I just felt so convicted in my spirit that it wasn't my job to wear this jersey."

In July 2018, Daniels received a call-up to the USWNT training camp for the 2018 Tournament of Nations, which marked her first call-up to the national team since withdrawing from camp in 2017. She was not named to the Tournament of Nations final roster. Daniels has failed to receive consistent call ups to the national team since then.

== Personal life ==
Daniels has spoken publicly about her Christian faith and views.

On June 26, 2015, after same-sex marriage in the United States was established in all 50 states, Daniels tweeted "This world is falling farther and farther away from God... All that can be done by believers is to continue to pray." In May 2018, shortly after she revealed her decision to not wear the U.S. team jersey honoring LGBT Pride Month, Daniels was booed several times by some Portland Thorns supporters during an NWSL match with the Courage. On July 29, 2022, she declined to play in the Courage's "Pride Night" match that night against the Washington Spirit, after a spokesperson confirmed she refused to wear the club's Pride flag-themed jersey. The club noted "While we're disappointed with her choice, we respect her right to make that decision for herself".

She is married to Matthew Daniels. Formerly known as Jaelene Hinkle, Daniels began using her married name in 2020. She gave birth to a daughter in August 2021.

== Honors ==
Western New York Flash

- NWSL Champions: 2016

North Carolina Courage

- NWSL Champions: 2018, 2019
- NWSL Shield: 2017, 2018, 2019
