= NWSL Golden Boot =

Annual award in US women's soccer

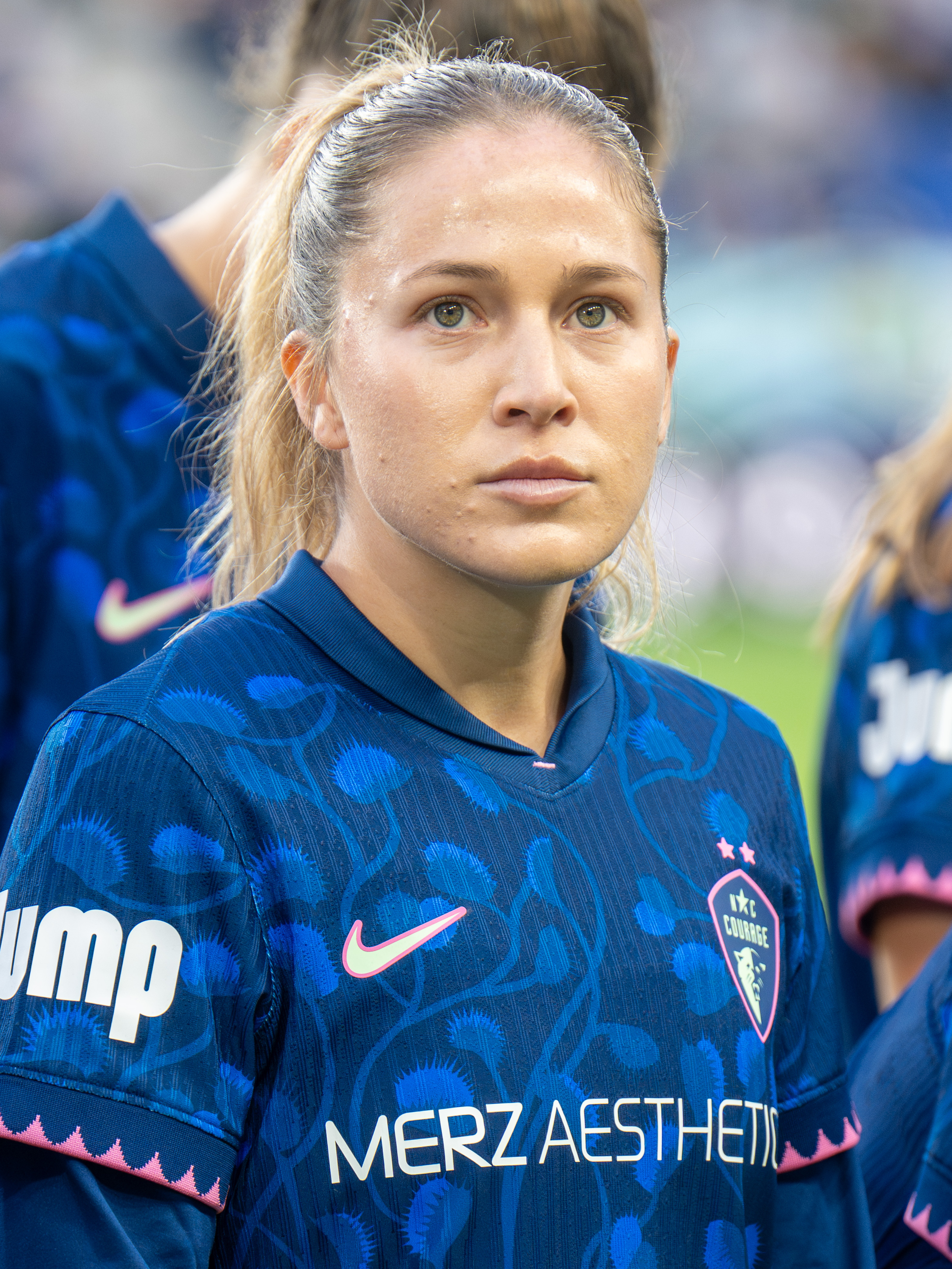
2026 winner Ashley Sanchez

The NWSL Golden Boot is awarded annually to the highest goal scorer in the regular season of the National Women's Soccer League (NWSL).

Lauren Holiday (2013) won the first Golden Boot in the NWSL's inaugural season. Temwa Chawinga (2024) and Ashley Sanchez (2026) share the record for most goals scored in a season with 20. Sam Kerr was the first player to win the Golden Boot more than once (2017–2019).

== Winners ==
Season	Player	Nationality	Club	Goals	Games	Rate	Ref.
2013	Lauren Holiday	United States	FC Kansas City	12	18	0.67	
2014	Kim Little	Scotland	Seattle Reign FC	16	23	0.70	
2015	Crystal Dunn	United States	Washington Spirit	15	20	0.75	
2016	Lynn Biyendolo (Note: Kealia Watt (née Ohai) also scored 11 goals in 2016, but Biyendolo (née Williams) won the tiebreaker with five assists to Watt's four.)	United States	Western New York Flash	11	19	0.58	
2017	Sam Kerr	Australia	Sky Blue FC	17	22	0.77	
2018	Sam Kerr (2)	Australia	Chicago Red Stars	16	19	0.84	
2019	Sam Kerr (3)	Australia	Chicago Red Stars	18	21	0.86	
2020	2020 regular season cancelled due COVID-19 pandemic						
2021	Ashley Hatch	United States	Washington Spirit	10	20	0.50	
2022	Alex Morgan	United States	San Diego Wave FC	15	17	0.88	
2023	Sophia Wilson	United States	Portland Thorns FC	11	17	0.65	
2024	Temwa Chaŵinga	Malawi	Kansas City Current	20	25	0.80	
2025	Temwa Chaŵinga (2)	Malawi	Kansas City Current	15	23	0.65	
2026	Ashley Sanchez	United States	North Carolina Courage	20	30	0.67	

== Wins by team ==
Club	Wins
Chicago Stars FC (Note: Previously named Chicago Red Stars.)	2
Kansas City Current	2
Washington Spirit	2
FC Kansas City	1
Gotham FC (Note: Previously named NJ/NY Gotham FC and Sky Blue FC.)	1
North Carolina Courage	1
Portland Thorns FC	1
San Diego Wave FC	1
Seattle Reign FC	1
Western New York Flash	1

== Wins by nationality ==
Nationality	Wins
United States	7
Australia	3
Malawi	2
Scotland	1

== See also ==
- List of sports awards honoring women
- NWSL awards
- NWSL Players' Awards
- NWSL records and statistics
- Women's soccer in the United States
