= NWSL Most Valuable Player =

Annual award in US women's soccer

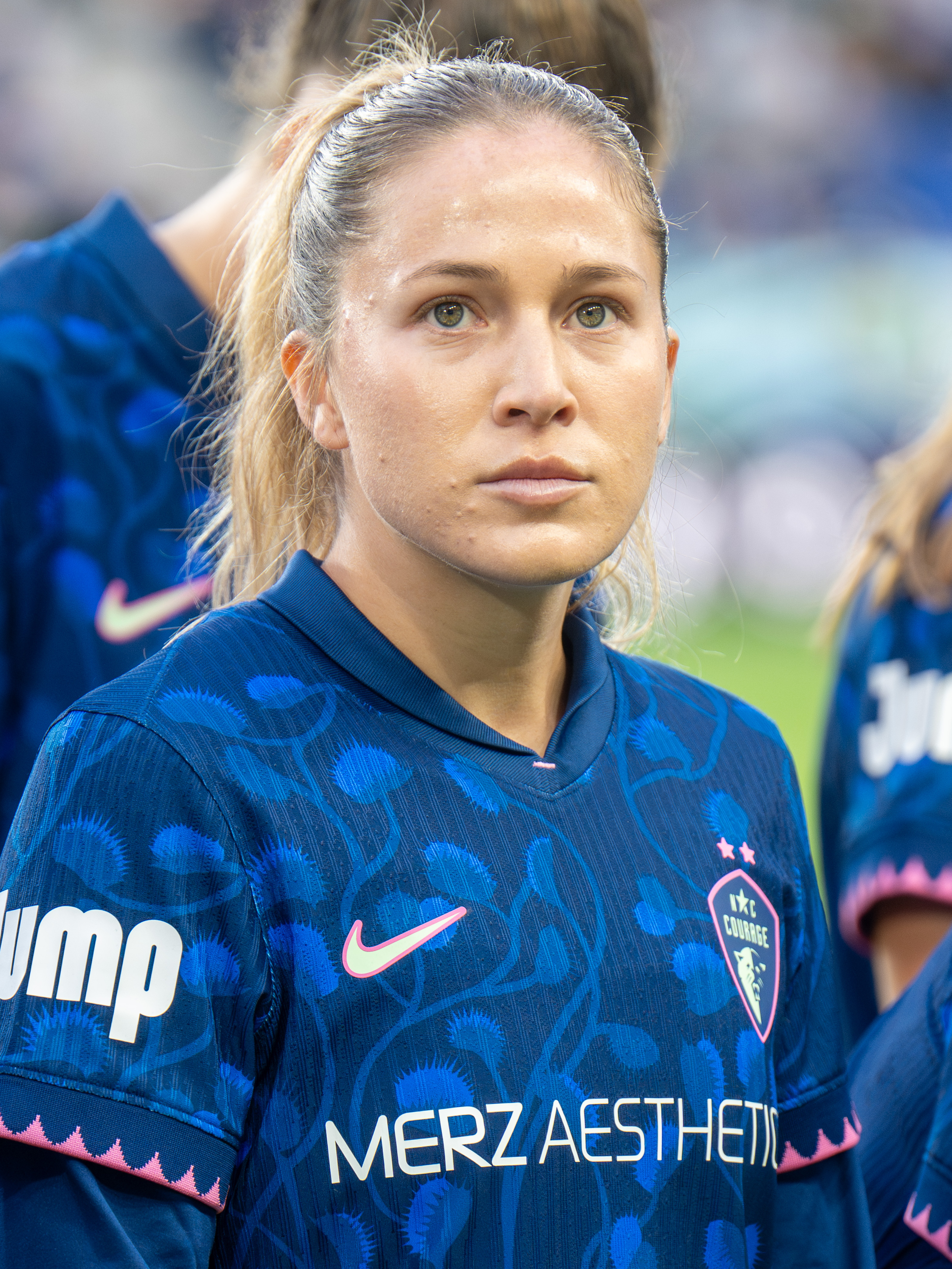
2026 winner Ashley Sanchez

The NWSL Most Valuable Player award is presented annually to the best player in the National Women's Soccer League (NWSL).

Lauren Holiday (2013) won the first MVP award in the NWSL's inaugural season. Lindsey Horan (2018) was the first winner not also to win the Golden Boot presented to the NWSL's top goal scorer. Sam Kerr (2017 and 2019) and Temwa Chawinga (2024 and 2025) are the only players to win multiple MVP awards. Five players born outside the United States have won the award: Kim Little (2014), Kerr, Jess Fishlock (2021), Kerolin (2023), and Chawinga. The most recent winner is Ashley Sanchez (2026).

As of 2025, the NWSL's individual end-of-year awards are voted upon in two rounds: in the first round, players (50%), owners/general managers/coaches (25%), and media (25%) vote to determine the nominees; in the second round, players (40%), owners/general managers/coaches (25%), media (25%), and fans (10%) vote among the nominees to determine the winner.

== Winners ==
Season	Player	Position	Nationality	Club	Other finalists	Ref.
2013	Lauren Holiday	Midfielder	United States	FC Kansas City	Lori Chalupny, Abby Wambach	
2014	Kim Little	Midfielder	Scotland	Seattle Reign FC	Verónica Boquete, Amy Rodriguez	
2015	Crystal Dunn	Forward	United States	Washington Spirit		
2016	Lynn Williams	Forward	United States	Western New York Flash	Tobin Heath, Allie Long, Kealia Ohai, Christen Press	
2017	Sam Kerr	Forward	Australia	Sky Blue FC	Marta, Sam Mewis, Christen Press, Megan Rapinoe	
2018	Lindsey Horan	Midfielder	United States	Portland Thorns FC	Sam Kerr, Megan Rapinoe, Lynn Williams, McCall Zerboni	
2019	Sam Kerr (2)	Forward	Australia	Chicago Red Stars	Debinha, Kristen Hamilton, Yūki Nagasato, Lynn Williams	
2020	2020 regular season cancelled due COVID-19 pandemic					
2021	Jess Fishlock	Midfielder	Wales	OL Reign (Note: Seattle Reign FC was previously known as OL Reign.)	Ashley Hatch, Mallory Pugh, Midge Purce, Angela Salem	
2022	Sophia Smith	Forward	United States	Portland Thorns FC	Debinha, Naomi Girma, Alex Morgan, Mallory Pugh	
2023	Kerolin	Forward	Brazil	North Carolina Courage	Sam Coffey, Debinha, Naomi Girma, Sophia Smith	
2024	Temwa Chawinga	Forward	Malawi	Kansas City Current	Barbra Banda, Marta, Trinity Rodman, Sophia Smith	
2025	Temwa Chawinga (2)	Forward	Malawi	Kansas City Current	Delphine Cascarino, Esther González, Manaka Matsukubo, Bia Zaneratto	
2026	Ashley Sanchez	Forward	United States	North Carolina Courage	Temwa Chawinga, Trinity Rodman, Janine Sonis, Sophia Wilson	

== Wins by team ==
Club	Wins
Kansas City Current	2
North Carolina Courage	2
Portland Thorns FC	2
Seattle Reign FC	2
Chicago Red Stars	1
FC Kansas City	1
Sky Blue FC	1
Washington Spirit	1
Western New York Flash	1

== Wins by nationality ==
Nationality	Wins
United States	6
Australia	2
Malawi	2
Brazil	1
Scotland	1
Wales	1

== See also ==
- List of sports awards honoring women
- NWSL Players' Awards
- NWSL awards
- NWSL records and statistics
- Women's soccer in the United States
