= 2022 NWSL Challenge Cup Championship =

Championship game of the 2022 NWSL Challenge Cup

- Event: 2022 NWSL Challenge Cup
North Carolina Courage	Washington Spirit
2	1
- Date: May 7, 2022
- Venue: WakeMed Soccer Park, Cary, North Carolina
- Final MVP: Kerolin, NC
- Referee: Katja Koroleva
- Attendance: 3,163

The 2022 NWSL Challenge Cup Championship, the final match of the 2022 NWSL Challenge Cup, was contested by North Carolina Courage and Washington Spirit.

== Road to the final ==
The Courage and Spirit finished the group stage as the top two teams in the East Division, both going undefeated and drawing 2–2 in both group-stage matches against each other. The Spirit advanced to the semi-finals as the team with the best record among second-place finishers in each division.

The Courage defeated second-seeded Kansas City Current 2–1 in its semi-final match, behind a penalty kick goal scored by Debinha and drawn by Kerolin, and the first professional goal by Diana Ordóñez. Kristen Hamilton scored for Kansas City in the 79th minute but could not complete a comeback.

The Spirit drew top-seeded OL Reign 0–0 in regulation time of their semi-final match, which was marked by a perceived officiating error in second-half stoppage time when a handball foul went uncalled against the Spirit's Anna Heilferty during a corner kick. The Challenge Cup did not employ a video assistant referee, which would not be introduced to NWSL competitions until 2023. With no extra time, the Spirit advanced by winning a penalty shoot-out 9–8. Spirit goalkeeper Aubrey Kingsbury scored the Spirit's third penalty and also saved the Reign's 8th and 10th penalty attempts to secure advancement.

Third-seeded North Carolina Courage won the right to host the final against fourth-seeded Washington Spirit by finishing with a better record in the group stage. Both teams were first-time finalists in the Challenge Cup.

Note: In all results below, the score of the finalist is given first.

North Carolina Courage		Round	Washington Spirit	
Opponent	Result	Group stage	Opponent	Result
NJ/NY Gotham FC	2–0	Match 1	Orlando Pride	0–0
Orlando Pride	1–0	Match 2	NJ/NY Gotham FC	1–1
Washington Spirit	2–2	Match 3	North Carolina Courage	2–2
NJ/NY Gotham FC	1–1	Match 4	Orlando Pride	4–1
Orlando Pride	4–2	Match 5	NJ/NY Gotham FC	3–1
Washington Spirit	2–2	Match 6	North Carolina Courage	2–2
Opponent	Result	Knockout stage	Opponent	Result
Kansas City Current	2–1	Semifinal	OL Reign	0–0 (9–8 p)

== Match ==
The match was scheduled for May 7, 2022, which coincided with the second matchweek of the 2022 regular season. Regular-season matches on that day between the Courage and Portland Thorns FC, and between the Spirit and Chicago Red Stars, were consequently rescheduled to later dates.

The Courage opened scoring in the 10th minute on Kerolin's first goal in her Courage career, with the Spirit's Ashley Hatch equalizing in the 35th minute.

In a sequence near the middle of the second half, Spirit defender Sam Staab tackled Kerolin in the Spirit's penalty area, with the ball going out of play. The tackle injured Kerolin, who was substituted out of the match. Courage players called for center referee Katja Koroleva to call a foul and award the Courage a penalty kick, but Koroleva instead issued a yellow card to Courage defender Merritt Mathias, the match's only penalty card, and awarded the Courage a corner kick.

During the ensuing corner kick, Spirit goalkeeper Aubrey Kingsbury was pushed by a teammate into the goal while falling, her head colliding with the goalpost, and defender Taylor Aylmer scored an own goal. Kingsbury remained down for several minutes and underwent concussion tests but returned to the match. and in a post-match press conference Spirit coach Kris Ward said she would be evaluated for delayed-onset concussion symptoms.

Aylmer's own goal would become the Courage's championship-winning score.

In the 80th minute, Spirit defender Jordan Baggett's head collided with Courage midfielder Debinha, with players reportedly shouting that Baggett was experiencing a seizure. Baggett's teammates helped paramedics carry an ambulance stretcher faster onto the pitch. After the match, Ward said Baggett was being transported to a local hospital, where she was released the same day. On June 3, the Spirit listed Baggett on the league's 45-day disabled list for a concussion.

=== Details ===
May 7
13:00 ET

North Carolina Courage	2–1	Washington Spirit
Kerolin 10'; Aylmer 70' (o.g.)	Report	Hatch 35'

WakeMed Soccer Park, Cary, North Carolina
Attendance: 3,163
Referee: Katja Koroleva

Courage	Spirit

GK	0	(United States) Katelyn Rowland
RB	11	(United States) Merritt Mathias	(yellow card) 68'
CB	3	(United States) Kaleigh Kurtz
CB	6	(New Zealand) Abby Erceg (c)
LB	4	(United States) Carson Pickett
DM	7	(United States) Malia Berkely
DM	8	(Republic of Ireland) Denise O'Sullivan
AM	16	(United States) Emily Gray		(substituted off) 85'
AM	10	(Brazil) Debinha
FW	12	(Mexico) Diana Ordoñez		(substituted off) 85'
FW	9	(Brazil) Kerolin		(substituted off) 74'
Substitutes:
GK	1	(United States) Casey Murphy
DF	2	(United States) Taylor Smith		(substituted in) 74'
DF	13	(United States) Ryan Williams
DF	14	(New Zealand) Katie Bowen
DF	15	(United States) Jaelene Daniels		(substituted in) 85'
MF	5	(United States) Brianna Pinto
MF	25	(United States) Meredith Speck		(substituted in) 85'
FW	29	(United States) Rylee Baisden
FW	33	(United States) Jorian Baucom
Manager:
(United States) Sean Nahas

GK	1	(United States) Aubrey Kingsbury (c)
RB	5	(United States) Kelley O'Hara	(substituted off) 74'
CB	6	(United States) Emily Sonnett
CB	3	(United States) Sam Staab
LB	16	(Sweden) Julia Roddar	(substituted off) 45'
DM	7	(United States) Taylor Aylmer	(substituted off) 80'
DM	19	(United States) Dorian Bailey
RM	2	(United States) Trinity Rodman
AM	10	(United States) Ashley Sanchez
LM	21	(United States) Anna Heilferty	(substituted off) 74'
ST	33	(United States) Ashley Hatch
Substitutes:
GK	18	(Canada) Devon Kerr
DF	4	(Mexico) Karina Rodríguez
DF	14	(United States) Morgan Goff	(substituted in) 74'
DF	22	(United States) Amber Brooks
DF	30	(United States) Camryn Biegalski	(substituted in) 45'
MF	11	(United States) Jordan Baggett	(substituted in) 80'	(substituted off) 90+6'
MF	13	(United States) Bayley Feist	(substituted in) 74'
FW	17	(England) Tinaya Alexander
FW	27	(United States) Audrey Harding	(substituted in) 90+6'
Manager:
(United States) Kris Ward

Most Valuable Player:
Kerolin, NC

Assistant referees
Katarzyna Wasiak
Ashlee Varnson
Fourth official
Adam Kilpatrick
Reserve assistant referee
Kali Smith

Match rules

- 90 minutes.
- Penalty shoot-out if scores level.
- Maximum of five substitutions. (Note: Each team was given only three opportunities to make substitutions, excluding substitutions made at half-time.)

== Broadcasting ==
On March 1, 2022, the league announced that the championship match would be broadcast on CBS, streamed domestically on Paramount+, and streamed internationally on Twitch. The match was also streamed in Canada on Radio-Canada. The match drew an estimated 368,000 viewers and 0.22 rating on CBS.

== Reaction ==
After the match, players expressed concern about injuries and the response by facility staff. Spirit forward Trinity Rodman posted to Twitter that the slow pace of the paramedic team to assist Baggett was "absolutely unacceptable", though press reports noted that paramedics are trained not to run to a scene.

Courage defender Abby Erceg criticized match officials for not calling a high-boot foul on Spirit forward Ashley Hatch after the studs of Hatch's boot struck Erceg's chest. After the match, Erceg and Katelyn Rowland both claimed that Koroleva told them the ball hit Erceg's ribs. Courage defender Kaleigh Kurtz and goalkeeping coach Nathan Thackeray also criticized officials on social media after the match about their lack of response to Spirit defender Sam Staab's tackle on Kerolin. Erceg further criticized the scheduling of the match, which forced both the Courage and Spirit to play three matches in a span of eight days and led to fatigue that lowered the quality of play.

Journalists, supporters' groups, and players on other teams also joined in criticism of the match, the tournament's structure and timing, and the league's ability to protect players. Australian international forward Hayley Raso, who fractured three vertebrae in a collision with Kingsbury during a 2018 match while playing for Portland Thorns FC, criticized the medical response to Baggett's injury as well as the league's lack of progress since her own injury. OL Reign players Nikki Stanton and Jess Fishlock, and Portland Thorns FC midfielder Lindsey Horan, publicly criticized the lack of player protection from officials. Fishlock further criticized the tournament's scheduling. Prior to the tournament, OL Reign forward Bethany Balcer also criticized the championship match's early kickoff time as potentially interfering with players' preparations for the match, and its date overlapping with the regular season as an injury risk.

The championship match's injuries also occurred in the context of a season-ending injury during an earlier cup match to Kansas City Current forward Lynn Williams, and injures in training to Chicago Red Stars defender Tierna Davidson, and during an early regular-season match to Orlando Pride midfielder Marta.

During the post-match press conference, Spirit coach Kris Ward described discussions involving coaches and league personnel about changes to the cup's format and restrictions imposed by broadcast partners. On November 17, 2022, the league announced changes to the tournament's format to take effect in the 2023 edition. Cup matches would take place entirely during the regular season but would no longer overlap with regular-season matchdays, instead positioning cup matches between regular-season rounds. The league cited player safety and performance as reasons for the scheduling changes.
