= 2022 Washington Spirit season =

Washington Spirit
2022 season
- President: Ben Olsen (until May 2)
- Head coach: Kris Ward (until August 22); Albertin Montoya (from Sept. 2 to Oct. 1)
- Stadium: Audi Field; Segra Field
- NWSL: 11th
- Challenge Cup: Runners-up
- Top goalscorer: League: Ashley Hatch (9); All: Ashley Hatch (15)
- Highest home attendance: 10,177
- Lowest home attendance: 1,961
- Average home league attendance: 6,222
Home colors	Away colors
- All statistics correct as of October 1, 2022.

The 2022 Washington Spirit season was the club's ninth season of play and their ninth season in the National Women's Soccer League, the top division of women's soccer in the United States.

The season began with the 2022 NWSL Challenge Cup on March 19, 2022, followed by a 22-match regular season that concluded on October 1, 2022.

== Background ==
In the prior season, the Spirit sat in seventh place—beyond playoff contention—with a 5–5–3 record through early August when head coach Richie Burke abruptly resigned, citing "health concerns." On August 11, The Washington Post published a report in which former Spirit players accused the coach of verbal and emotional abuse. The Spirit continued playing under interim coach Kris Ward while additional investigations continued around the league. In September, they forfeited two consecutive matches for failing to adhere to the NWSL's COVID-19 protocols. However, after those two forfeits, Washington would not lose any of their remaining 12 regular season matches, finishing the regular season in third place and earning a spot in the playoffs. Ashley Hatch received the NWSL Golden Boot as the league's top scorer.

The Spirit defeated the defending-champion North Carolina Courage at home after extra time in the first playoff round, defeated OL Reign in the semifinals in Seattle, and then captured the NWSL Championship in November by defeating the Chicago Red Stars in extra time. Following the season, Kris Ward was named permanent head coach.

In the team's front office, CEO Steve Baldwin had also been accused of nepotism and retaliatory behavior, leading to fellow co-owner Y. Michelle Kang calling him for sell his ownership interest in the team, a sentiment echoed by players directly. On October 14, The Washington Post reported that Baldwin had announced to club investors that he intended to sell the club. Kang became majority owner of the Spirit on March 30, 2022.

In the offseason, the Spirit lost two defenders from the 2021 squad: Paige Nielsen left for Angel City FC in the 2022 NWSL Expansion Draft, while fellow defender Tegan McGrady joined San Diego Wave FC. They added veteran defender Amber Brooks, who signed a one-year contract in March. Following an outstanding rookie season, Trinity Rodman signed a four year, $1.1 million contract—the largest in NWSL history. The Spirit roster remained largely intact ahead of the 2022 season.

The club introduced two new kits for 2022. A navy blue "Community Kit," worn during the Challenge Cup showcased Washington-based charity DC SCORES. The regular season kit added a lighter blue sleeve and side stripe. Both kits added a single star marking the team's 2021 league championship. The Kennedy Center sponsored the regular season jersey front.

=== Transfers ===
In

Position	Player	Transferred from	Fee	Date	Ref
DF	(United States) Alia Martin	(United States) Michigan Wolverines	Free	December 18, 2021	
MF	(United States) Gaby Vincent	(United States) Kansas City Current	$25,000 allocation money and 2023 4th round pick	December 20, 2021	
DF	(United States) Amber Brooks	(United States) OL Reign	Free	March 17, 2022	
DF	(United States) Madison Elwell	(United States) Vanderbilt Commodores	Free	May 12, 2022	
FW	(United States) Audrey Harding	(United States) UNC Wilmington	Free	May 1, 2022	
MF	(Republic of Ireland) Marissa Sheva	(United States) Utah Royals FC	Free	June 3, 2022	

Out

Position	Player	Transferred to	Fee	Date	Ref
DF	(United States) Tegan McGrady	(United States) San Diego Wave FC	With 2022 international roster spot and 2022 first-round draft pick for full protection from San Diego in 2022 NWSL Draft	December 1, 2021	
DF	(United States) Mary Alice Vignola	(United States) Angel City FC	For $30,000 allocation money and allocated player protection with Angel City in 2022 NWSL Draft	December 6, 2021	
MF	(Jamaica) Chinyelu Asher	(Sweden) AIK	Waived	December 8, 2021	
FW	(United States) Cali Farquharson	(Sweden) KIF Örebro	Waived	December 8, 2021	
FW	(Venezuela) Mariana Speckmaier	(Russia) CSKA Moscow	Waived	December 8, 2021	
DF	(United States) Paige Nielsen	(United States) Angel City FC	Drafted as seventh pick by Angel City FC	December 16, 2021	
FW	(Japan) Kumi Yokoyama	(United States) NJ/NY Gotham FC	For 2023 4th round pick	February 17, 2022	
FW	(England) Tinaya Alexander	(France) Montpellier HSC	Undisclosed transfer fee.	September 20, 2022	

=== Draft picks ===
Draft picks are not automatically signed to the team roster. Only those who are signed to a contract are listed as incoming transfers.

Player	Pos.	Previous Team	Notes	Ref.
(England) Tinaya Alexander	FW	(United States) LSU Tigers	14th overall pick	
(United States) Madison Elwell	FW	(United States) Vanderbilt Commodores	15th overall pick	
(England) Lucy Shepherd	FW	(United States) Hofstra Pride	23rd overall pick	
(United States) Audrey Harding	FW	(United States) UNC Wilmington	38th overall pick	
(United States) Jordan Thompson	DF	(United States) Gonzaga Bulldogs	50th overall pick	

=== New contracts ===
Position	Player	Date	Notes	Ref
DF	(United States) Camryn Biegalski	December 8, 2021	Team option exercised	
GK	(Canada) Devon Kerr	December 8, 2021	Team option exercised	
DF	(Mexico) Karina Rodríguez	December 8, 2021	Team option exercised	
DF	(United States) Morgan Goff	December 22, 2021	Re-signed for one year with 2023 option	
MF	(United States) Taylor Aylmer	December 22, 2021	Re-signed for one year with 2023 option	
FW	(United States) Ashley Hatch	December 22, 2021	Re-signed for two years with 2024 option	
GK	(United States) Nicole Barnhart	January 31, 2022	One year	
FW	(United States) Trinity Rodman	February 2, 2022	Three years including 2025 club option	
DF	(United States) Kelley O'Hara	March 3, 2022	One year	
FW	(United States) Audrey Harding	August 25, 2022	Through end of 2022 season	
MF	(United States) Marissa Sheva	August 25, 2022	Through end of 2022 season	

== Pre-season ==
Due to obstacles in using D.C. United's practice facilities in Loudoun County, Virginia, the Spirit trained at other venues in Northern Virginia including Episcopal High School and The St. James sports complex. In February, they moved to IMG Academy in Bradenton, Florida with a 38-player training camp roster. That roster included most of their winter draft picks and several non-roster invitees.

The team played a series of friendlies to prepare for the forthcoming season. They lost the first match decisively to Kansas City Current 6–0, with goals from six different Kansas City players. In mid–February, several American players returned to the US national team to compete in the 2022 SheBelieves Cup, while Devon Kerr, Sydney Schneider, Karina Rodríguez, and Julia Roddar were called up to Canada, Jamaica, Mexico, and Sweden, respectively. Returning to Washington for two additional intra-team scrimmages, the Spirit winnowed their roster to 30 players on March 2 ahead of the 2022 NWSL Challenge Cup.

== Challenge Cup ==
The Challenge Cup is the NWSL's primary league cup tournament. It was first played in 2020 following the cancellation of the regular season due to the COVID-19 pandemic. Angel City and San Diego, new expansion clubs, competed for the first time in the Challenge Cup. In the 2021 cup, Washington had failed to advance beyond the group stage. The twelve league teams were divided into three groups, with Washington initially competing twice against the other three teams in its group: Gotham, North Carolina, and Orlando. As defending league champions, the Spirit entered the tournament with "the target on their backs."

=== Group stage ===
Washington fought to a scoreless draw against Orlando on the road on the cup's opening weekend. Trinity Rodman and Ashley Sanchez created several opportunities in the first half but did not score. Back at Segra Field for the first time in 2022 against Gotham FC, Rodman tackled Margaret Purce on a corner kick in the box, earning Gotham a penalty kick which Kristie Mewis converted. Down at halftime, Washington inserted 2021 scoring leader Ashley Hatch, who equalized on a pass from Sanchez. The Spirit moved to Audi Field for the next match against North Carolina. They fell behind 2–0 with just two shots through 58 minutes, but rallied for two goals in the second half with goals from Rodman and Hatch. Washington earned a dominant 4–1 win in their final home match against Orlando, a game that saw goalkeeper Devon Kerr make her first start since signing with the team in 2020. Traveling to New Jersey to face Gotham a second time, the Spirit fell behind after Nahomi Kawasumi opened the scoring in the fourth minute. An equalizer from Sanchez and two goals by Rodman enabled a 3–1 win. In the final group stage match against North Carolina — the first time the Spirit saw a national television audience — Washington managed a 2–2 draw. The point helped North Carolina clinch the Challenge Cup East Division, but left the Spirit needing an unlikely win from then-winless Angel City over Portland the next night to advance to the semifinals. With that win from Angel City, the Spirit advanced to face OL Reign in the semifinals.

March 19	Orlando Pride	0–0	Washington Spirit	Orlando, Florida
19:00 EDT	Lawrence (yellow card) 31'; Marta (yellow card) 90'; Strom (yellow card) 90+6'	Report	Heilferty (yellow card) 73'; Biegalski (yellow card) 78'; Aylmer (yellow card) 90+2'	Stadium: Exploria Stadium; Referee: Laura Rodriguez (Colorado)

March 25	Washington Spirit	1–1	NJ/NY Gotham FC	Leesburg, Virginia
19:30 EDT	Brooks (yellow card) 37' (red card); Rodman (yellow card) 55'; Hatch 61'	Report	Mewis 23' (pen.); Lewandowski (yellow card) 90+1'; Torres (yellow card) 90+3'	Stadium: Segra Field; Attendance: 3,421; Referee: Alyssa Nichols (Mississippi)

March 30	Washington Spirit	2–2	North Carolina Courage	Washington, D.C.
19:30 EDT	Staab (yellow card) 14'; Rodman 58'; Sullivan (yellow card) 64'; Hatch 67'	Report	Debinha 5'; Smith 26'; Pickett (yellow card) 45+2'; Berkely (yellow card) 59'; Kurtz (yellow card) 76'	Stadium: Audi Field; Attendance: 2,155; Referee: Danielle Chesky (Virginia)

April 3	Washington Spirit	4–1	Orlando Pride	Washington, D.C.
16:00 EDT	Sanchez 43'; Sullivan 45'; Hatch 49'; Rodman 87'	Report	James (yellow card) 27'; Jónsdóttir 54'; Turner (yellow card) 74'	Stadium: Audi Field; Attendance: 5,656; Referee: Sergii Demianchuk (Georgia)

April 17	NJ/NY Gotham FC	1–3	Washington Spirit	Harrison, New Jersey
15:00 EDT	Kawasumi 4'; Dorsey (yellow card) 30'	Report	Sanchez 24'; Rodman 39', 75'; Aylmer (yellow card) 53'	Stadium: Red Bull Arena; Attendance: 2,061; Referee: Elvis Osmanovic (Florida)

April 23	North Carolina Courage	2–2	Washington Spirit	Cary, North Carolina
13:00 EDT	Erceg (yellow card) 37'; Debinha 45+4' (pen.); Berkely 52'	Report	Hatch 15', 75' (pen.); Rodriguez (yellow card) 19'	Stadium: WakeMed Soccer Park; Attendance: 3,905; Referee: Eric Tattersall (Ohio)

==== Divisional standings ====
Pos	Team	Pld	W	T	L	GF	GA	GD	Pts	Qualification	NC	WAS	NJY	ORL
1	North Carolina Courage	6	3	3	0	12	7	+5	12	Advance to knockout stage	—	2–2	2–0	1–0
2	Washington Spirit	6	2	4	0	12	7	+5	10	Advance to knockout stage based on ranking	2–2	—	1–1	4–1
3	NJ/NY Gotham FC	6	1	3	2	5	8	−3	6		1–1	1–3	—	1–1
4	Orlando Pride	6	0	2	4	4	11	−7	2		2–4	0–0	0–1	—

Source: NWSL
Rules for classification: 1) Total points; 2) Total goal differential; 3) Total number of goals scored; 4) Head-to-head points record; 5) Head-to-head goal differential; 6) Head-to-head number of goals scored; 7) Fewest disciplinary points; 8) Drawing of lots

=== Knockout stage ===
The knockout stage took place after the regular season opener on May 1, which coincidentally saw the Spirit defeat OL Reign 2–1. In addition to fixture congestion, the league was criticized for lack of venue availability: the league announced the game would be played at Segra Field after neither Lumen Field nor Audi Field were initially available. Working with stadium organizers, the league moved the game back to Audi Field, although OL Reign were considered the home team. During the match, both teams created chances but remained scoreless after regulation. Megan Rapinoe debuted in second-half stoppage time for OL Reign. In the final minutes of regulation, Rapinoe's corner kick deflected onto Anna Heilferty's hand, but the referee blew his whistle to end regulation rather than reward OL Reign a penalty kick. Reign players were furious, with Rapinoe later commenting that Heilferty's hand "was out on fucking Jupiter." To determine a victor, the game moved to penalty kicks. Both teams converted in the first seven rounds; both goalkeepers saved the eighth attempt and both teams made their ninth try. In the tenth round, Sam Staab converted a ninth penalty kick for the Spirit and Aubrey Kingsbury made a game-winning save.

May 4 Semifinal	OL Reign	0–0 (8–9 p)	Washington Spirit	Washington, D.C.
20:00 EDT	Lavelle (yellow card) 18'	Report	Ward (yellow card) 70'; Roddar (yellow card) 87'; Rodman (yellow card) 90+1'	Stadium: Audi Field; Attendance: 3,015; Referee: Greg Dopka (Illinois)
	Penalties
	Lavelle (penalty scored); Cook (penalty scored); Miramontez (penalty scored); Rapinoe (penalty scored); Balcer (penalty scored); Huerta (penalty scored); Watt (penalty scored); Stanton (penalty missed); Hiatt (penalty scored); Fishlock (penalty missed)		(penalty scored) Hatch; (penalty scored) Sonnett; (penalty scored) Kingsbury; (penalty scored) Sanchez; (penalty scored) Rodman; (penalty scored) Bailey; (penalty scored) Roddar; (penalty missed) Alexander; (penalty scored) Heilferty; (penalty scored) Staab

=== Championship ===
The Spirit advanced to the championship game against North Carolina on May 7, 2022. Both teams rescheduled regular season matches to accommodate the final. The Courage took the lead on a Kerolin goal in the tenth minute. Washington avoided another penalty kick when another handball foul went uncalled, then equalized when Trinity Rodman passed through to Ashley Hatch for a goal against her former team. In the second half, Sam Staab tackled Kerolin in the box, but no foul was called. On the ensuing corner kick, the ricocheting ball deflected off Taylor Aylmer and into her own goal. Goalkeeper Aubrey Kingsbury's head collided with the post on the save attempt, and she was down for several minutes but remained in the game. Later in the second half, Hatch inadvertently kicked Abby Erceg in the stomach but was not issued a penalty. Finally, Jordan Baggett collided with Kerolin early in second-half stoppage time and suffered an apparent head or neck injury. She was stretchered off the field and taken to the hospital. Both coaches acknowledged team exhaustion following the game. The Spirit's loss was the first since September 2021 (12–0–8 over that time). As runners-up in the cup, each player received a $5,000 bonus. On May 12, the NWSL fined Hatch an undisclosed amount for unsportsmanlike conduct during the final.

May 7 Final	North Carolina Courage	2–1	Washington Spirit	Cary, North Carolina
13:00 EDT	Kerolin 10'; Aylmer 70' (o.g.)	Report	Hatch 35'	Stadium: WakeMed Soccer Park; Attendance: 3,163; Referee: Katja Koroleva (Washington)

== Regular season ==
The 2022 season of the National Women's Soccer League saw 12 teams play 22 matches: one against every other team, with one match at each club's stadium. Three points were awarded for each win, one point per draw, and none for defeats. At the end of the season, the top two teams qualify for first-round byes in the NWSL Playoffs, while four more teams play in an opening playoff round.

=== May ===
Washington hosted OL Reign on the opening weekend of the regular season in front of more than 10,000 fans at Audi Field. Spirit standouts Andi Sullivan and Kelley O'Hara were unavailable due to injuries. Ashley Sanchez put Washington ahead early. Reign goalkeeper Phallon Tullis-Joyce made nine saves in the first half to keep the lead slim, and Seattle midfielder Rose Lavelle equalized after halftime. Ashley Hatch put Washington ahead for good in the 66th minute. The two teams faced off again in the Challenge Cup semifinals three days later; Washington won but would go on to lose the Challenge Cup final to North Carolina. Expansion team Angel City FC played at Washington the following weekend in a return to regular season action. Sullivan and O'Hara remained unavailable alongside Jordan Baggett, who had suffered a head injury in the Challenge Cup final. Christen Press opened the scoring late in the first half to put Los Angeles on top. Despite sending in Sanchez and Trinity Rodman in the second half, Washington could not equalize. The Spirit loss ended a 19-game unbeaten streak dating to fall 2021. In midweek action three days later, Washington managed a draw on the road against Portland. Striker Sophia Smith put the visitors ahead, but Hatch quickly equalized. During the first half, defender Amber Brooks passed 10,000 career minutes in the NWSL. A would-be Emily Sonnett goal was ruled offside in the second half. Following the match, Ward criticized the offside call, saying the referees "get a failing grade in every sense of the word tonight." He and the club itself were later fined for their comments.

The Spirit continued up the Pacific coast to face OL Reign yet again on the ensuing weekend. Sullivan and O'Hara made their regular season debuts. After the teams fought to a scoreless draw, Camryn Biegalski said "I'm not even going to lie: I don't want to see them again." Washington closed out May on the road against Orlando. Rodman earned her first regular season goal in the 19th minute. Sanchez capitalized on a defensive error by the Pride in the second half, passing to Sanchez who fired past Erin McLeod to put the Spirit up 2–0. The Spirit lead collapsed in second half stoppage time. Second half substitute Jordyn Listro earned her first professional assist after sending a cross to Mikayla Cluff, who tipped the ball past Kingsbury. Orlando equalized when Darian Jenkins sent the ball to the back of the net in the 98th minute.

=== June ===
Washington began June play at Segra Field against Chicago, whom they had last faced in the 2021 championship. After four games in the second half of May, defender Sam Staab noted "this schedule that we've had is insane." They conceded an early goal on an Ella Stevens header, but Staab equalized late in the second half to salvage a point for the Spirit. Traveling north to Red Bull Arena to face Gotham three days later, Kris Ward commented "[f]rankly, we're playing people who are exhausted. There's no other way to say it. They're exhausted. You come in, you've played three games in a week, the other team's played one game in a week, what are you supposed to do?" Due to COVID-19 protocols, the Spirit were without Trinity Rodman or Aubrey Harding. A goal from Midge Purce was enough to earn Gotham the win, and Washington fell to tenth in the league standings.

Only a week after earning a draw against the Red Stars in Virginia, the Spirit then traveled to Chicago to face them again on June 8. Ward kept Rodman and Sanchez on the bench, giving Washington rookie Madison Elwell a chance to make her professional debut. After a scoreless first half, Ward sent in Rodman, Sanchez, and Biegalski. The game ended in a draw. The team returned home to play North Carolina for the first time in the regular season after two draws and a loss in the Challenge Cup final. Making her second start for the Courage after an injury in the Challenge Cup final, Kerolin opened the scoring. Captain Abby Erceg later doubled the Courage's lead, but Washington found its momentum and drew even on second half goals from Sanchez and Hatch. In stoppage time, a set piece enabled Kaleigh Kurtz to send the game-winner past Kingsbury to hand the Spirit another loss.

Washington played its final June match before an international break at home against Louisville the following Friday. The Spirit led early with a goal from Rodman. Hatch found Elwell late in the first half, who shot the ball past Katie Lund to earn her first NWSL goal and give Washington a 2–0 lead. That lead collapsed in the second half after Nadia Nadim scored in the 66th minute and equalized in the 88th minute. The Spirit headed into the international break with just 9 points over 10 regular season games and winless since the May 1 opener.

During the international break, defender Morgan Goff announced her retirement.

=== July ===
The Spirit played three matches in July without seven players fulfilling international team duties: Ashley Hatch, Aubrey Kingsbury, Kelley O'Hara, Trinity Rodman, Ashley Sanchez, Emily Sonnett, and captain Andi Sullivan joined the United States to compete in the 2022 CONCACAF W Championship. Washington signed six players to national team replacement contracts to fill out the roster — forwards Brenna Connell and Jamie Fields, midfielders Andrea Frerker and Katie Murray joined the team for the first time, while forward Audrey Harding and midfielder Marissa Sheva were converted from injury replacement contracts.

The team resumed play July 3 on the road, facing San Diego Wave FC for the first time in their inaugural season. Fields, Sheva, and goalkeeper Devon Kerr made their first regular season starts for the club, while Jordan Baggett, Dorian Bailey, and Tara McKeown returned from injury. The Wave went ahead 2–0 in the first half on goals from Makenzy Doniak and Belle Briede. Baggett connected on a cross from McKeown late in second-half stoppage time to cut the lead in half, but the Spirit left San Diego in 11th place. Following this match, Ward was fined by the league for a second time in 2022, this time for approaching the officials after the game.

Returning to Segra Field the following week against Kansas City, Washington made several starting changes. They were held scoreless in the first half. In the second half, Kansas City brought on Cece Kizer who put the visitors up 1–0 on the Current's first shot on goal. A late foul gave Tinaya Alexander a penalty kick opportunity in second-half stoppage time, but Adrianna Franch saved her attempt. Back at Audi Field for the first time in two months, Washington played their final shorthanded match with Orlando. The Spirit created several scoring chances throughout the game and outshot the visitors 17–4, but the game ended in a scoreless draw. Despite earning a point, the team remained near the bottom of the league table.

Nearly two weeks later, the final match of the month was against North Carolina on the road after a league break. The Spirit returned five starters to their lineup after international fixtures, although Sonnett and Hatch were unavailable due to injuries. North Carolina, whose defender Jaelene Daniels was non-rostered after refusing to wear the club's Pride Night jerseys, had defeated the Spirit in May's Challenge Cup final, also at Sahlen's Stadium. The Friday night match was delayed in the 24th minute due to lightning and resumed an hour later. Sanchez connected with Rodman to give the Spirit the lead. The Courage equalized a few minutes later when Brittany Ratcliffe beat two defenders and sent a shot past Kingsbury. In first half stoppage time, Washington took the lead once more when O'Hara's cross provided a header opportunity for McKeown. Shortly after the second half began, North Carolina equalized again when Meredith Speck sent the ball past Kingsbury for an easy tap-in by Diana Ordoñez. Rodman beat another Courage defender to find the net a second time in the 56th minute to earn the first two-goal match of her NWSL career. A few minutes later, Ratcliffe drew contact while not in possession to earn a controversial foul. Ordoñez converted the ensuing penalty kick to tie the game at 3–3. After six goals in 20 minutes, neither team would convert again, and the game ended in a draw. After the game, O'Hara expressed frustration: "we were up three times, and we blew it."

=== August ===
On August 22, 2022, the Spirit fired Ward after a 1–6–9 record to start the 2022 season. In a press conference on August 25, general manager Mark Krikorian cited Ward's record and an incident at a training session as reasons for Ward's firing, and that the club had reported the issues to the league and NWSL Players Association. Assistant coach Angela Salem replaced Ward in training sessions pending club plans to appoint an interim coach.

On August 25, the Spirit placed Emily Sonnett on the season-ending injury list to rehabilitate from a foot injury, and signed National Team Replacement players Marissa Sheva and Audrey Harding to the active roster.

On August 27, the Spirit announced the addition of Mike Bristol, former assistant to Mark Krikorian at Florida State, to an unnamed position on the Spirit's coaching staff. It also announced that Salem would "handle head coaching duties" during the August 27 match against Houston Dash, but did not name her acting or interim head coach.

=== September ===
On September 2, the Spirit named former FC Gold Pride and U.S. under-17 girls' national team coach Albertin Montoya as interim head coach.

=== Matches ===
May 1 1	Washington Spirit	2–1	OL Reign	Washington, D.C.
17:00 EDT	Sanchez 14' (Heilferty); Hatch 66' (Rodman); Kingsbury (yellow card) 90+2'	Report	Lavelle 53'; Stanton (yellow card) 71'; Cook (yellow card) 74'; López (yellow card) 86'	Stadium: Audi Field; Attendance: 10,177; Referee: Alex Billeter (Florida)

May 15 2	Washington Spirit	0–1	Angel City FC	Washington, D.C.
17:00 EDT	Roddar (yellow card) 45+1'	Report	Press 42' (Gilles), (yellow card) 77'; Breslin (yellow card) 90+6'	Stadium: Audi Field; Attendance: 7,433; Referee: Anya Voigt (Florida)

May 18 3	Portland Thorns FC	1–1	Washington Spirit	Portland, Oregon
19:00 PDT	Smith 57' (Kuikka); Hubly (yellow card) 82'	Report	Hatch 63' (Heilferty); Elwell (yellow card) 90+1'	Stadium: Providence Park; Attendance: 9,876; Referee: Brad Jensen (Utah)

May 22 4	OL Reign	0–0	Washington Spirit	Seattle, Washington
15:00 PDT	Van der Jagt (yellow card) 74'	Report	Rodman (yellow card) 71'	Stadium: Lumen Field; Attendance: 5,846; Referee: Samantha Martinez (California)

May 27 5	Orlando Pride	2–2	Washington Spirit	Orlando, Florida
19:00 EDT	Montefusco (yellow card) 77'; Cluff 90+5' (Listro); Jenkins 90+8'	Report	Rodman 19' (Harding), (yellow card) 81'; Feist (yellow card) 22'; Sanchez (yellow card) 42'; Hatch 66' (Sanchez), (yellow card) 75'; Brooks (yellow card) 90'	Stadium: Exploria Stadium; Attendance: 3,586; Referee: Matt Thompson (Mississippi)

June 1 6	Washington Spirit	1–1	Chicago Red Stars	Leesburg, Virginia
19:30 EDT	Roddar (yellow card) 29'; Staab 86' (Sullivan), (yellow card) 90+1'	Report	Stevens 10' (Griffith); Milazzo (yellow card) 45+2'	Stadium: Segra Field; Attendance: 1,961; Referee: Adam Kilpatrick (Massachusetts)

June 4 7	NJ/NY Gotham FC	1–0	Washington Spirit	Harrison, New Jersey
19:00 EDT	Purce 21' (Onumonu); Monaghan (yellow card) 74'; Betos (yellow card) 88'	Report	Goff (yellow card) 90+8'	Stadium: Red Bull Arena; Attendance: 6,433; Referee: JC Griggs (Virginia)

June 8 8	Chicago Red Stars	0–0	Washington Spirit	Bridgeview, Illinois
19:00 CDT	Cook (yellow card) 66'	Report	Sonnett (yellow card) 24'; Aylmer (yellow card) 45'; Rodman (yellow card) 76'	Stadium: SeatGeek Stadium; Attendance: 2,312; Referee: Calin Radosav (Illinois)

June 11 9	Washington Spirit	2–3	North Carolina Courage	Leesburg, Virginia
19:00 EDT	Sanchez 74' (Feist); Hatch 79' (pen.); Staab (yellow card) 90+1'	Report	Kerolin 6' (Pinto), (yellow card) 90+4'; Erceg 50' (Pickett); O'Sullivan (yellow card) 89'; Kurtz 90+2'	Stadium: Segra Field; Attendance: 4,236; Referee: Jeremy Scheer (Connecticut)

June 17 10	Washington Spirit	2–2	Racing Louisville FC	Leesburg, Virginia
19:30 EDT	Roddar (yellow card) 8'; Rodman 34' (Sanchez); Elwell 43'; O'Hara (yellow card) 51'	Report	Nadim 66' (McDonald), 88' (McDonald); Fox (yellow card) 73'	Stadium: Segra Field; Attendance: 2,790; Referee: Matt Franz (Virginia)

July 3 11	San Diego Wave FC	2–1	Washington Spirit	San Diego, California
14:00 PDT	Doniak 36' (Westphal); Briede 45+4' (Schimmer)	Report	Alexander (yellow card) 90+2'; Baggett 90+3' (McKeown)	Stadium: Torero Stadium; Attendance: 6,000; Referee: Samantha Martinez (California)

July 10 12	Washington Spirit	0–1	Kansas City Current	Leesburg, Virginia
17:00 EDT		Report	Bennett (yellow card) 59'; Kizer 68'	Stadium: Segra Field; Attendance: 2,932; Referee: Adorae Monroy (Washington)

July 17 13	Washington Spirit	0–0	Orlando Pride	Washington, D.C.
17:00 EDT	Aylmer (yellow card) 45+4'	Report		Stadium: Audi Field; Attendance: 7,795; Referee: Alyssa Nichols (Mississippi)

July 29 14	North Carolina Courage	3–3	Washington Spirit	Cary, North Carolina
19:30 EDT	Ratcliffe 45' (O'Sullivan); Ordoñez 53' (Speck), 62' (pen.)	Report	Bailey (yellow card) 29'; Rodman 42' (Sanchez), 56'; McKeown 45+1' (O'Hara)	Stadium: Sahlen's Stadium; Attendance: 3,568; Referee: JC Griggs (Virginia)

August 5 15	Racing Louisville FC	1–1	Washington Spirit	Louisville, Kentucky
20:00 EDT	Nadim 52' (Davis); Lester (yellow card) 78'	Report	Hatch 64' (Baggett)	Stadium: Lynn Family Stadium; Attendance: 5,364

August 10 16	Washington Spirit	1–2	Portland Thorns FC	Leesburg, Virginia
20:39 EDT	Brooks (yellow card) 48'; Sullivan (yellow card) 63'; Bixby 76' (o.g.)	Report	Sinclair 84'; Weaver 90+2'	Stadium: Segra Field; Attendance: 3,037; Referee: Jeremy Scheer (Connecticut)
Note: Lightning delayed kickoff from its originally scheduled time of 19:30 EDT.

August 27 17	Houston Dash	2–2	Washington Spirit	Houston, Texas
19:30 CDT	Schmidt 22'; Dydasco (yellow card) 45+3'; Jacobs (yellow card) 55'; Alozie 90+1'	Report	Brooks (yellow card) 42'; Hatch 53' (Rodman), 55' (Sanchez); Biegalski (yellow card) 85'	Stadium: PNC Stadium; Attendance: 5,031; Referee: Adorae Monroy (Washington)

September 10 18	Washington Spirit	4–3	San Diego Wave FC	Washington, D.C.
13:00 EDT	McKeown 11' (Sanchez); Heilferty (yellow card) 13'; Brooks 30', 44' (Staab), (yellow card) 55'; Sanchez (yellow card) 45+5'; Hatch 90+10' (pen.)	Report	Shaw 7' (van Egmond); Morgan 57' (pen.), 82' (van Egmond); Riehl (yellow card) 63'; McNabb (yellow card) 77'	Stadium: Audi Field; Attendance: 10,158; Referee: Karen Callado (California)

September 17 19	Washington Spirit	2–0	NJ/NY Gotham FC	Washington, D.C.
19:00 EDT	Staab (yellow card) 33'; McKeown 51'; Hatch (yellow card) 79'; Sanchez 86'	Report	Monaghan (yellow card) 29'	Stadium: Audi Field; Attendance: 8,781; Referee: Shawn Tehini (North Carolina)

September 21 20	Angel City FC	2–1	Washington Spirit	Los Angeles, California
19:30 PDT	Emslie 39' (Riley); Charley 51' (Spencer)	Report	Hatch 88' (pen.); Rodman (yellow card) 90+4'	Stadium: Banc of California Stadium; Attendance: 16,112; Referee: Elton Garcia (Texas)

September 25 21	Kansas City Current	3–0	Washington Spirit	Kansas City, Kansas
16:00 CDT	LaBonta 18' (Del Fava); Kizer 38' (Loera); Lavogez 41' (Hamilton)	Report	Roddar (yellow card) 8'; Staab (yellow card) 27'	Stadium: Children's Mercy Park; Attendance: 9,593; Referee: Alyssa Nichols (Mississippi)

October 1 22	Washington Spirit	1–2	Houston Dash	Washington, D.C.
19:00 EDT	Sullivan 36' (pen.) (yellow card) 47'; Staab (yellow card) 73'	Report	Viggiano 14' (Gareis); Chapman (yellow card) 42'; Roddar 58' (o.g.); Schmidt (yellow card) 77'; Prisock (yellow card) 84'	Stadium: Audi Field; Attendance: 9,141; Referee: Samantha Martinez (California)

=== League table ===
Pos	Team	Pld	W	D	L	GF	GA	GD	Pts	Qualification
1	OL Reign	22	11	7	4	32	19	+13	40	NWSL Shield, Playoffs – semi-finals
2	Portland Thorns FC (C)	22	10	9	3	49	24	+25	39	Playoffs – semi-finals
3	San Diego Wave FC	22	10	6	6	32	21	+11	36	Playoffs – first round
4	Houston Dash	22	10	6	6	35	27	+8	36	Playoffs – first round
5	Kansas City Current	22	10	6	6	29	29	0	36	Playoffs – first round
6	Chicago Red Stars	22	9	6	7	34	28	+6	33	Playoffs – first round
7	North Carolina Courage	22	9	5	8	46	33	+13	32	
8	Angel City FC	22	8	5	9	23	27	−4	29	
9	Racing Louisville FC	22	5	8	9	23	35	−12	23	
10	Orlando Pride	22	5	7	10	22	45	−23	22	
11	Washington Spirit	22	3	10	9	26	33	−7	19	
12	NJ/NY Gotham FC	22	4	1	17	16	46	−30	13	

Source: NWSL
Rules for classification: Tiebreakers
(C) Champions

==== Results summary ====
Overall								Home						Away					
Pld	W	D	L	GF	GA	GD	Pts	W	D	L	GF	GA	GD	W	D	L	GF	GA	GD
22	3	10	9	26	33	−7	19	3	3	5	15	16	−1	0	7	4	11	17	−6

Last updated: October 1, 2022.
Source: NWSLsoccer.com

==== Results by matchday ====
Matchday	1	2	3	4	5	6	7	8	9	10	11	12	13	14	15	16	17	18	19	20	21	22
Stadium	H	H	A	A	A	H	A	A	H	H	A	H	H	A	A	H	A	H	H	A	A	H
Result	W	L	D	D	D	D	L	D	L	D	L	L	D	D	D	L	D	W	W	L	L	L
Position	4	7	7	8	6	8	10	8	8	8	11	11	11	10	10	11	11	10	10	10	11	11

Updated to match(es) played on October 1, 2022. Source: NWSL
A = Away; H = Home; W = Win; D = Draw; L = Loss

== Players ==
Washington has used a total of 27 players during the 2022 season and there have been 8 different goal scorers. There have also been three squad members who have not made a first-team appearance in the campaign.

The team has scored a total of 27 goals in all competitions. The highest scorer has been Hatch, with 10 goals, followed by Rodman who has scored 8 goals.

Key

No. = Squad number

Pos = Playing position

Nat. = Nationality

Apps = Appearances

GK = Goalkeeper

DF = Defender

MF = Midfielder

FW = Forward

= Yellow cards

= Red cards

Numbers in parentheses denote appearances as substitute. Players with name struck through and marked † left the club during the playing season.

Player statistics
No.	Pos.	Nat.	Name	Challenge Cup		NWSL		Total		Discipline	
No.	Pos.	Nat.	Name	Apps	Goals	Apps	Goals	Apps	Goals	A yellow rectangular card	A red rectangular card
1	GK	(United States)	Aubrey Kingsbury	7 (1)	0	11	0	18 (1)	0	1	0
2	FW	(United States)	Trinity Rodman	8	4	9 (1)	4	17 (1)	8	5	0
3	DF	(United States)	Sam Staab	7	0	14	1	21	1	3	0
4	DF	(United States)	Karina Rodríguez	3 (1)	0	4 (1)	0	7 (2)	0	1	0
5	DF	(United States)	Kelley O'Hara	8	0	1 (4)	0	9 (4)	0	1	0
6	DF	(United States)	Emily Sonnett	4 (1)	0	9 (1)	0	13 (2)	0	1	0
7	MF	(United States)	Taylor Aylmer	5 (2)	0	8 (6)	0	13 (8)	0	3	0
8	FW	(United States)	Averie Collins	0	0	(1)	0	(1)	0	0	0
9	FW	(United States)	Tara McKeown	2	0	3 (1)	1	5 (1)	1	0	0
10	FW	(United States)	Ashley Sanchez	8	2	9 (2)	2	17 (2)	4	1	0
11	MF	(United States)	Jordan Baggett	(3)	0	3 (1)	1	3 (4)	1	0	0
12	MF	(United States)	Andi Sullivan	4	1	4 (2)	0	8 (2)	1	1	0
13	MF	(United States)	Bayley Feist	1 (3)	0	9 (5)	0	10 (8)	0	1	0
14	DF	(United States)	~~Morgan Goff~~†	(4)	0	3 (4)	0	3 (8)	0	1	0
16	DF	(Sweden)	Julia Roddar	7 (1)	0	12	0	19 (1)	0	4	0
17	FW	(England)	~~Tinaya Alexander~~†	1 (4)	0	1 (7)	0	2 (11)	0	1	0
18	GK	(Canada)	Devon Kerr	1	0	3	0	4	0	0	0
19	MF	(United States)	Dorian Bailey	2 (1)	0	5 (1)	0	7 (2)	0	1	0
20	MF	(United States)	Gaby Vincent	1 (1)	0	(1)	0	1 (2)	0	0	0
21	MF	(United States)	Anna Heilferty	5 (3)	0	12 (2)	0	17 (5)	0	1	0
22	DF	(United States)	Amber Brooks	3 (1)	0	5 (5)	0	8 (6)	0	3	1
25	MF	(United States)	Marissa Sheva	0	0	3 (1)	0	3 (1)	0	0	0
27	FW	(United States)	Audrey Harding	(1)	0	4 (5)	0	4 (6)	0	0	0
29	MF	(United States)	Madison Elwell	0	0	4 (5)	1	4 (5)	1	1	0
30	DF	(United States)	Camryn Biegalski	4 (4)	0	8 (3)	0	12 (7)	0	1	0
33	FW	(United States)	Ashley Hatch	7 (1)	6	9 (1)	4	16 (2)	10	1	0
34	FW	(United States)	Jamia Fields	0	0	1	0	1	0	0	0
