= 2021 Washington Spirit season =

Washington Spirit
2021 season
- President: Ben Olsen
- Head coach: vacant
- Stadium: Audi Field; Segra Field
- NWSL: 3rd
- NWSL Playoffs: Champions
- Challenge Cup: Group stage
- Top goalscorer: League: Ashley Hatch (10); All: Ashley Hatch (11)
Home colors	Away colors

The 2021 Washington Spirit season was the club's 11th season of existence, and its ninth in the National Women's Soccer League, the top division of women's soccer in the United States.

The season began with the 2021 NWSL Challenge Cup on April 9, 2021 followed by a 24-match regular season. The regular season concluded on October 31, 2021. The Spirit made its first playoff appearance in five years on November 7, 2021, taking down the defending league champion North Carolina Courage in a quarterfinal match at Audi Field. On November 14, Washington took down two-seed OL Reign in Tacoma to advance to the 2021 NWSL Championship Game in Louisville, KY. The following Saturday, November 20, the Spirit earned its first league title with a 2-1 win over the Chicago Red Stars after extra time.

== Background ==
The 2020 season was the Washington Spirit's seventh season. The season was slated to begin on April 18, 2020 but was postponed due to the COVID-19 pandemic. Ultimately, the NWSL season was cancelled due to the pandemic. The club participated in the NWSL Challenge Cup and the NWSL Fall series which were held in lieu of the regular season. The Challenge Cup was held behind closed doors at the neutral venue of Zions Bank Stadium in Herriman, Utah. The Spirit reached the Quarterfinals of the Challenge Cup, and finished in third place in the Fall Series. Combined across all matches, the Spirit had the second best record of matches played during the 2020 season.

== Club ==
=== Roster ===
As of September 11, 2021.

No.	Pos.	Player	Nation
1	GK	USA	Aubrey Bledsoe
2	FW	USA	Trinity Rodman
3	DF	USA	Sam Staab
5	DF	USA	Kelley O'Hara
6	DF	USA	Emily Sonnett
7	MF	JPN	Saori Takarada
8	FW	USA	Averie Collins
9	DF	USA	Tegan McGrady
10	FW	USA	Ashley Sanchez
11	MF	USA	Jordan DiBiasi
12	MF	USA	Andi Sullivan
13	FW	USA	Bayley Feist
14	DF	USA	Paige Nielsen
16	MF	SWE	Julia Roddar
17	FW	JPN	Kumi Yokoyama
18	GK	CAN	Devon Kerr
19	MF	USA	Dorian Bailey
20	FW	VEN	Mariana Speckmaier
21	MF	USA	Anna Heilferty
23	DF	USA	Tori Huster
24	MF	JAM	Chinyelu Asher
25	DF	MEX	Karina Rodriguez
27	FW	USA	Tara McKeown
28	DF	USA	Morgan Goff
30	DF	USA	Camryn Biegalski
31	GK	JAM	Sydney Schneider
33	FW	USA	Ashley Hatch

== Management and support staff ==
Role	Name
Manager	Vacant
Technical Staff Coach	(United States) Kris Ward
Goalkeeping coach	(England) Paul Crichton
High Performance Director	(United States) Michael Minthorne

== Non-competitive ==
March 6, 2021 Preseason	Palm Beach Atlantic Sailfish	0–6	Washington Spirit	West Palm Beach, Florida
		Report	Hatch 18' (Sanchez), 23', 39' (Feist); Feist 27'; Rodman 51', 71'	Stadium: Marshall and Vera Lea Rinker Athletic Campus

March 13, 2021 Preseason	Washington Spirit	5–0	IMG Academy	West Palm Beach, Florida
	O'Hara 29'; Sanchez 54' (pen.); Feist 64' (Sanchez), 69'; Sonnett 83' (Sanchez)	Report		Stadium: Marshall and Vera Lea Rinker Athletic Campus

March 20, 2021 Preseason	Washington Spirit	Canceled	Orlando Pride	West Palm Beach, Florida
		Report		Stadium: Marshall and Vera Lea Rinker Athletic Campus
Note: Canceled due to false positive Coronavirus disease 2019 tests at Spirit training camp.

== Competitive ==
=== NWSL Challenge Cup ===
==== Standings ====
Pos	Team	Pld	W	D	L	GF	GA	GD	Pts	Qualification
1	NJ/NY Gotham FC	4	2	2	0	5	3	+2	8	Qualification for the Championship
2	North Carolina Courage	4	2	1	1	9	8	+1	7	
3	Orlando Pride	4	1	2	1	3	3	0	5	
4	Washington Spirit	4	1	1	2	3	4	−1	4	
5	Racing Louisville FC	4	0	2	2	4	6	−2	2	

Source: NWSL
Rules for classification: Tiebreakers

==== Results ====
April 10 1	North Carolina Courage	3–2	Washington Spirit	Cary, North Carolina
3:30 PM EDT (UTC-4)	Hamilton 10'; McDonald 28'; Mathias 51' (yellow card) 90+7'	Report	Yokoyama 4'; Rodman 60'; Jacobs (yellow card) 63'	Stadium: Sahlen's Stadium at WakeMed Soccer Park; Attendance: 2,300; Referee: Alyssa Nichols (Mississippi)

April 15, 2021 2	Washington Spirit	1–0	Racing Louisville FC	Washington, D.C.
7:00 PM EDT (UTC-4)	Roddar (yellow card) 60'; Huster (yellow card) 80'; Sanchez 90+3'	Report	Olofsson (yellow card) 52'	Stadium: Audi Field; Referee: Danielle Chesky (Virginia)

April 21, 2021 3	Orlando Pride	1–0	Washington Spirit	Orlando, Florida
7:00 PM EDT (UTC-4)	Leroux 11'; Marta (yellow card) 13'; Riley (yellow card) 36'; Harris (yellow card) 80'	Report	Sonnett (yellow card) 6'; O'Hara (yellow card) 86' (yellow-red card) 90+2'	Stadium: Exploria Stadium; Referee: Alex Billeter (Florida)

April 27, 2021 4	Washington Spirit	0–0	NJ/NY Gotham FC	Washington, D.C.
7:00 PM EDT (UTC-4)	Heilferty (yellow card) 87'	Report		Stadium: Audi Field; Attendance: 2,039; Referee: Karen Callado (California)

=== NWSL ===
==== Standings ====
Pos	Team	Pld	W	D	L	GF	GA	GD	Pts	Qualification
1	Portland Thorns FC	24	13	5	6	33	17	+16	44	NWSL Shield
2	OL Reign	24	13	3	8	37	24	+13	42	Playoffs – Semi-finals
3	Washington Spirit (C)	24	11	6	7	29	26	+3	39	Playoffs – First round
4	Chicago Red Stars	24	11	5	8	28	28	0	38	Playoffs – First round
5	NJ/NY Gotham FC	24	8	11	5	29	21	+8	35	Playoffs – First round
6	North Carolina Courage	24	9	6	9	28	23	+5	33	Playoffs – First round
7	Houston Dash	24	9	5	10	31	31	0	32	
8	Orlando Pride	24	7	7	10	27	32	−5	28	
9	Racing Louisville FC	24	5	7	12	21	40	−19	22	
10	Kansas City	24	3	7	14	15	36	−21	16	

Source: NWSL
Rules for classification: Tiebreakers
(C) Champions

==== Results ====
May 16, 2021 1	Orlando Pride	1–1	Washington Spirit	Orlando, Florida
7:00 PM EDT (UTC-4)	Morgan 84'	Report	Hatch (yellow card) 74' (goal) 76'	Stadium: Exploria Stadium; Referee: Karen Callado (California)

May 21, 2021 2	Racing Louisville FC	2–0	Washington Spirit	Louisville, Kentucky
7:30 PM EDT (UTC-4)	Ekic 76'; Kizer 81'; Baucom (yellow card) 90+1'; Martin (yellow card) 90+2'	Report	Rodman (yellow card) 46'; Bailey (yellow card) 70'	Stadium: Lynn Family Stadium; Attendance: 6,011; Referee: Katja Koroleva (Washington)

May 26, 2021 3	Houston Dash	1–2	Washington Spirit	Houston, Texas
6:30 PM CDT (UTC-5)	Daly 9'; Hanson (yellow card) 44'; Groom (yellow card) 75'; Prince (yellow card) 90 + 5 '	Report	Sanchez 21'; Sullivan (yellow card) 44' (yellow-red card) 50'; Hatch 70' (yellow card) 80'	Stadium: BBVA Stadium; Attendance: 2,241; Referee: Natalie Simon (Florida)

May 30, 2021 4	OL Reign	0–1	Washington Spirit	Tacoma, Washington
4:00 PM PDT (UTC-7)	Brooks (yellow card) 52'	Report	Rapinoe 52' (o.g.); Bailey (yellow card) 65'	Stadium: Cheney Stadium; Attendance: 2,537; Referee: Samantha Martinez (California)

June 6, 2021 5	Washington Spirit	1–1	Orlando Pride	Washington, D.C.
2:00 pm EDT (UTC-4)	Hatch 64'; Heilferty (yellow card) 90+1'	Report	Petersen (yellow card) 39'; Morgan (yellow card) 46'; Kornieck 67'	Stadium: Audi Field; Attendance: 5,199; Referee: Adorae Monroy (Washington)

June 19, 2021 6	Chicago Red Stars	1–1	Washington Spirit	Bridgeview, Illinois
7:00 PM CDT (UTC-5)	Gautrat 90 + 2'	Report	Rodman 85'	Stadium: SeatGeek Stadium; Attendance: 3,296; Referee: Karen Abt (Colorado)

June 26, 2021 7	Kansas City	1–2	Washington Spirit	Kansas City, Missouri
7:30 PM CDT (UTC-5)	Rodriguez 3'; LaBonta (yellow card) 33'; Edmonds (yellow card) 56'; Jenkins (yellow card) 73'	Report	Sanchez 78'; Rodman 90 + 5'	Stadium: Legends Field; Attendance: 5,157; Referee: Laura Rodriguez (Colorado)

July 2, 2021 8	Washington Spirit	0–1	Chicago Red Stars	Leesburg, Virginia
7:00 PM EDT (UTC-4)		Report	Roddar 33' (o.g.)	Stadium: Segra Field; Attendance: 3,201; Referee: JC Griggs (Virginia)

July 10, 2021 9	Washington Spirit	2–0	North Carolina Courage	Washington, D.C.
7:00 PM EDT (UTC-4)	Hatch 12,46'	Report		Stadium: Audi Field; Attendance: 4,929; Referee: Matt Franz (Virginia)

July 18, 2021 10	Washington Spirit	2–3	NJ/NY Gotham FC	Leesburg, Virginia
5:00 PM EDT (UTC-4)	Staab (red card) 7'; Rodman 13'; Sanchez 56'	Report	Kawasumi 24'; Zerboni 35'; Long (yellow card) 51'; Purce 76' (yellow card) 90+2'	Stadium: Segra Field; Referee: Karen Callado (California)

July 25, 2021 11	Racing Louisville FC	0–2	Washington Spirit	Louisville, Kentucky
3:00 PM EDT (UTC-4)		Report	Hatch 5'; Staab 58'; Bledsoe (yellow card) 90+1'	Stadium: Lynn Family Stadium; Attendance: 6,422; Referee: Samantha Martinez (California)

August 1, 2021 12	Chicago Red Stars	3–1	Washington Spirit	Bridgeview, Illinois
5:00 PM CDT (UTC-5)	Pugh 19'; Hill 39'; Gautrat 80'	Report	Rodman (yellow card) 30'; Rodman 71'; Aylmer (yellow card) 68'; Staab (yellow card) 79'	Stadium: SeatGeek Stadium; Attendance: 2,534; Referee: Natalie Simon (Florida)

August 7, 2021 13	Washington Spirit	0–1	Portland Thorns FC	Leesburg, Virginia
7:30 PM EDT (UTC-4)	Sullivan (yellow card) 65'	Report	Charley 29'; Smith (yellow card) 70'	Stadium: Segra Field; Attendance: 2,899; Referee: Katja Koroleva (Washington)

August 13, 2021 14	Houston Dash	2–2	Washington Spirit	Houston, Texas
7:30 PM CDT (UTC-5)	Latsko 61' (yellow card) 90+4'; Fields (yellow card) 67'; Abam 83'	Report	Huster (yellow card) 5' (goal) 53'; Nielsen 8'	Stadium: BBVA Stadium; Referee: Laura Rodriguez (Colorado)

August 22, 2021 15	Washington Spirit	2–1	Orlando Pride	Washington, D.C.
4:00 PM EDT (UTC-4)	Hatch 70'; Sanchez 89'	Report	Turner (yellow card) 46'; Marta 68'; Strom (yellow card) 46'	Stadium: Audi Field; Attendance: 6,002; Referee: Tori Penso (Florida)

August 29, 2021 16	Washington Spirit	0–0	North Carolina Courage	Washington, D.C.
5:00 PM EDT (UTC-4)	Roddar (yellow card) 90+3'	Report	Williams (yellow card) 55'	Stadium: Audi Field; Attendance: 4,554; Referee: Greg Dopka (Illinois)

September 4, 2021 17	Portland Thorns FC	3–0	Washington Spirit	Portland, Oregon
7:30 PM PDT (UTC-7)		Report		Stadium: Providence Park
Note: The NWSL declared a forfeit due to breaches of medical protocols by the Washington Spirit. Portland received a 3–0 win according to FIFA guidelines.

September 12, 2021 18	Washington Spirit	0–3	OL Reign	Washington, D.C.
5:00 PM EDT (UTC-4)		Report		Stadium: Audi Field
Note: The NWSL declared a forfeit due to breaches of medical protocols by the Washington Spirit. OL Reign received a 3–0 win according to FIFA guidelines.

September 26, 2021 19	Washington Spirit	2–1	Kansas City	Leesburg, Virginia
5:00 PM EDT (UTC-4)	Sullivan 45+3'; McKeown 46'		Jenkins 8'	Stadium: Segra Field; Attendance: 3,295; Referee: Karen Abt (Colorado)

October 6, 2021 21	NJ/NY Gotham FC	0–0	Washington Spirit	Chester, Pennsylvania
7:00 PM EDT (UTC-4)				Stadium: Subaru Park; Attendance: 9,532; Referee: Ismir Pekmic (Minnesota)

October 9, 2021 22	Washington Spirit	3–0	Racing Louisville FC	Washington, D.C.
7:30 PM EDT (UTC-4)	Hatch 8,80'; Sullivan 52'			Stadium: Audi Field; Referee: Laura Rodriguez (Colorado)

October 14, 2021 20	North Carolina Courage	1–2	Washington Spirit	Cary, North Carolina
7:30 PM EDT (UTC-4)	Speck 60'		Rodman 39'; Roddar 70'	Stadium: Sahlen's Stadium at WakeMed Soccer Park; Attendance: 3,742; Referee: Sergii Demianchuk (Georgia)

October 16, 2021 23	OL Reign	0–2	Washington Spirit	Tacoma, Washington
7:00 PM PDT (UTC-7)		Report	Aylmer 22'; Hatch 59'	Stadium: Cheney Stadium; Attendance: 4,009; Referee: Katja Koroleva (Washington)

October 31, 2021 24	Washington Spirit	1–0	Houston Dash	Washington, D.C.
2:00 PM EDT (UTC-4)	Rodman 76'			Stadium: Audi Field; Attendance: 4,542; Referee: Danielle Chesky (Virginia)

==== Playoffs ====
November 7, 2021 First round	Washington Spirit	1–0	North Carolina Courage	Washington, D.C.
5:30 PM EST (UTC-5)	Hatch 113'	Report		Stadium: Audi Field; Attendance: 5,379; Referee: Natalie Simon (Florida)

November 14, 2021 Semi-finals	OL Reign	1–2	Washington Spirit	Tacoma, Washington
3:00 PM EST (UTC-5)	Le Sommer 3'	Report	Rodman 12'; Sanchez 68'	Stadium: Cheney Stadium; Attendance: 5,273; Referee: Matt Franz (Virginia)

November 20, 2021 Final	Washington Spirit	2–1	Chicago Red Stars	Louisville, Kentucky
12:00 PM EST (UTC-5)	Sullivan 67'; O'Hara 97'	Report	Hill 45+5'	Stadium: Lynn Family Stadium; Attendance: 10,360; Referee: Tori Penso (Florida)

== Transfers ==
=== Transfers in ===
Date	Position	No.	Name	From	Fee/notes	Ref.
December 24, 2020	MF	6	(United States) Emily Sonnett	(United States) Orlando Pride	Trade for Meggie Dougherty Howard	
January 26, 2021	MF	16	(Sweden) Julia Roddar	(Sweden) Göteborg	Free	
June 23, 2021	DF	25	(Mexico) Karina Rodriguez	(United States) UCLA Bruins	Free	

=== Transfers out ===
Date	Position	No.	Name	To	Fee/notes	Ref.
August 18, 2020	MF	10	(United States) Rose Lavelle	(England) Manchester City	Free	
November 2, 2020	FW	20	(Jamaica) Cheyna Matthews	(United States) Racing Louisville	Waived	
November 12, 2020	GK	21	(United States) Katie Lund	(United States) Racing Louisville	Draft	
November 12, 2020	FW	6	(United States) Katie McClure	(United States) Racing Louisville	Draft	
December 24, 2020	MF	8	(United States) Meggie Howard	(United States) Orlando Pride	Trade for Emily Sonnett	
December 30, 2020	DF	5	(United States) Brooke Hendrix	(United States) Racing Louisville	Free	
January 7, 2021	FW	18	(United States) Jessie Scarpa	(Sweden) KIF Örebro	Free	
July 8, 2021	DF	4	(United States) Natalie Jacobs	(Spain) Real Betis	Wavied	

=== NWSL Draft picks ===
2021 Washington Spirit Draft Picks
Round	Selection	Player	Nat.	Position	College	Ref.
1	2	Trinity Rodman	USA	FW	Washington State	
1	8	Tara McKeown	USA	FW	USC	
2	19	Anna Heilferty	USA	FW	Boston U	
3	29	Sydney Schneider	JAM	GK	UNC Wilmington	
4	39	Mariana Speckmaier	VEN	FW	Clemson	

== Player statistics ==
=== Top scorers ===
Place	Pos.	No.	Name	CC	NWSL	NWSL Playoffs	Total
1	FW	33	(United States) Ashley Hatch	0	10	1	11
2	FW	2	(United States) Trinity Rodman	1	6	1	8
3	FW	10	(United States) Ashley Sanchez	1	4	1	6
4	MF	12	(United States) Andi Sullivan	0	2	1	3
5	FW	17	(Japan) Kumi Yokoyama	1	0	0	1
5	DF	3	(United States) Sam Staab	0	1	0	1
5	DF	14	(United States) Paige Nielsen	0	1	0	1
5	MF	23	(United States) Tori Huster	0	1	0	1
5	DF	27	(United States) Tara McKeown	0	1	0	1
5	MF	16	(Sweden) Julia Roddar	0	1	0	1
5	MF	26	(United States) Taylor Aylmer	0	1	0	1
5	DF	5	(United States) Kelley O'Hara	0	0	1	1
6			Own Goal	0	1	0	1
Total				3	29	5	37

=== Assist leaders ===
Place	Pos.	No.	Name	CC	NWSL	NWSL Playoffs	Total
1	FW	2	(United States) Trinity Rodman	1	5	1	7
2	MF	12	(United States) Andi Sullivan	0	3	0	3
3	DF	4	(United States) Natalie Jacobs	1	1	0	2
3	MF	23	(United States) Tori Huster	0	2	0	2
3	MF	26	(United States) Taylor Aylmer	0	2	0	2
3	FW	27	(United States) Tara McKeown	0	2	0	2
3	DF	3	(United States) Sam Staab	0	1	1	2
4	DF	5	(United States) Kelley O'Hara	0	1	0	1
4	MF	19	(United States) Dorian Bailey	1	0	0	1
4	MF	16	(Sweden) Julia Roddar	0	1	0	1
Total				3	18	2	23

=== Clean sheets ===
Place	Pos.	No.	Name	CC	NWSL	NWSL Playoffs	Total
1	GK	1	(United States) Aubrey Bledsoe	2	8	1	11
Total				2	8	1	11

=== Disciplinary ===
Pos.	No.	Name	CC		NWSL		NWSL Playoffs		Total	
Pos.	No.	Name	Booked	Sent off (straight red)	Booked	Sent off (straight red)	Booked	Sent off (straight red)	Booked	Sent off (straight red)
GK	1	(United States) Aubrey Bledsoe	0	0	1	0	0	0	1	0
FW	2	(United States) Trinity Rodman	0	0	4	0	0	0	4	0
DF	3	(United States) Sam Staab	0	0	1	1	0	0	1	1
DF	4	(United States) Natalie Jacobs	1	0	0	0	0	0	1	0
DF	5	(United States) Kelley O'Hara	1	1	0	0	1	0	2	1
DF	6	(United States) Emily Sonnett	1	0	0	0	0	0	1	0
FW	10	(United States) Ashley Sanchez	0	0	3	0	0	0	3	0
MF	12	(United States) Andi Sullivan	0	0	2	1	0	0	2	1
DF	16	(Sweden) Julia Roddar	1	0	2	0	1	0	4	0
MF	19	(United States) Dorian Bailey	0	0	1	0	0	0	1	0
DF	21	(United States) Anna Heilferty	1	0	1	0	0	0	2	0
DF	23	(United States) Tori Huster	1	0	3	0	0	0	4	0
MF	26	(United States) Taylor Aylmer	0	0	1	0	0	0	1	0
FW	33	(United States) Ashley Hatch	0	0	2	0	0	0	2	0
Total			6	1	24	2	2	0	32	3
