= Morgan Goff =

American soccer player (born 1997)

Personal information
- Full name: Morgan Goff Scholl
- Birth name: Morgan Elizabeth Goff
- Date of birth: December 12, 1997 (age 28)
- Place of birth: Fort Bragg, North Carolina, U.S.
- Height: 5 ft 8 in (1.73 m)
- Position: Defender

Youth career
- CASL

College career
| Years | Team | Apps | (Gls) |
| 2016–2019 | North Carolina Tar Heels | 100 | (4) |

Senior career*
| Years | Team | Apps | (Gls) |
| 2020 | Þróttur Reykjavík | 14 | (2) |
| 2021–2022 | Washington Spirit | 7 | (0) |
- * Club domestic league appearances and goals as of 16:29, May 3, 2026 (UTC)

Morgan Goff Scholl (née Goff; born December 12, 1997) is an American former professional soccer player who played as a defender. She played college soccer for the North Carolina Tar Heels before playing professionally for Icelandic club Þróttur Reykjavík and the Washington Spirit of the National Women's Soccer League (NWSL), winning the 2021 NWSL Championship with the Spirit.

== Early life ==
Goff was born on Fort Bragg and raised in a military family. She grew up in Dunn, North Carolina, where she was a four-year ECNL captain for club team CASL and twice won the team's sportsmanship award. Goff attended Triton High School, where she played one year of prep soccer as a sophomore. Her lone season was a successful one, as she set program records for single-season goals and single-match goals en route to helping Triton earn a state playoff victory. Across 17 games, her goal total ranked second in the state of North Carolina that year. Goff earned All-State and All-Region honors for her efforts.

== College career ==
Five of Goff's immediate family members were collegiate athletes, and both of Goff's parents graduated from University of North Carolina at Chapel Hill. Goff dreamt of playing for the North Carolina Tar Heels since she was five years old. In 2016, her dream came to fruition as she entered her freshman season with the Tar Heels. In her first year at North Carolina, she appeared in all of the team's matches except for one as a substitute, mostly serving as a backup to Darcy McFarlane. She scored her first college goal in October 30, 2016, heading in a Dorian Bailey corner kick in a 3–0 ACC Tournament win over Virginia.

As a sophomore in 2017, Goff made 7 starts on the year; that figure would increase to 8 as a junior in 2018, during which she also recorded a career-high 3 assists as the Tar Heels fell to Florida State in the NCAA tournament final. In her final year at North Carolina, Goff started a career-high 14 games. In the NCAA tournament final, she was deputized as a defensive midfielder and helped keep Stanford scoreless over 110 minutes before the Tar Heels lost on penalties. Across her four-year college career, Goff had contributed to two ACC regular-season titles and two ACC tournament titles.

== Club career ==
=== Þróttur Reykjavík ===
After graduating from college, Goff joined National Women's Soccer League club Washington Spirit in the 2021 NWSL preseason as a non-rostered trialist, but did not make the team's final roster. Instead, she signed her first professional contract with Icelandic Besta deild kvenna club Þróttur Reykjavík, joining fellow American M.A. Vignola. Goff scored her first pro goal in September 2020, striking from long range in a 2–2 relgation battle with FH. She scored once more, on October 4, 2020, before leaving Þróttur at the end of the season. She had made 14 league appearances and one Icelandic Women's Football Cup appearance.

=== Washington Spirit ===
On July 8, 2021, Goff signed a short-term national team replacement contract with the Washington Spirit, with whom she had trained with the previous year. On August 21, the Spirit signed her through the end of the 2021 NWSL season. Goff did not make a competitive appearance at any point in the year, but watched on from the sidelines as the Spirit won the 2021 NWSL Championship on a 2–1 victory over the Chicago Red Stars.

Ahead of the 2022 season, the Spirit re-signed Goff to a one-year contract with a club option to extend for an additional season. Goff made her club debut on April 3, 2022, coming on as a second-half substitute for Anna Heilferty in an NWSL Challenge Cup match against the Orlando Pride. One month later, she made a substitute cameo in the 2022 NWSL Challenge Cup Championship, in which Washington were beaten by the North Carolina Courage. On June 23, 2022, Goff announced her retirement from professional soccer. She had made 7 league appearances and 4 cup appearances in her two seasons with the Spirit.

== Personal life ==
Goff married Casey Scholl in July 2025. The couple welcomed their first child on August 19, 2026.

== Career statistics ==
=== Club ===
Appearances and goals by club, season and competition
| Club | Season | League | | | Cup (Note: Includes the Icelandic Women's Football Cup and the NWSL Challenge Cup) | | Playoffs (Note: Includes NWSL playoffs) | | Total | |
| Club | Season | Division | Apps | Goals | Apps | Goals | Apps | Goals | Apps | Goals |
|---|---|---|---|---|---|---|---|---|---|---|
| Þróttur Reykjavík | 2020 | Besta deild kvenna | 14 | 2 | 1 | 0 | — | | 15 | 2 |
| Washington Spirit | 2021 | NWSL | 0 | 0 | — | | 0 | 0 | 0 | 0 |
| Washington Spirit | 2022 | NWSL | 7 | 0 | 4 | 0 | — | | 11 | 0 |
| Washington Spirit | Total | | 7 | 0 | 4 | 0 | 0 | 0 | 11 | 0 |
| Career total | | | 21 | 2 | 5 | 0 | 0 | 0 | 26 | 2 |

== Honors ==
North Carolina Tar Heels

- Atlantic Coast Conference: 2018, 2019
- ACC women's soccer tournament: 2017, 2019

Washington Spirit

- NWSL Championship: 2021
