= 2021 NWSL Championship =

Women's soccer match in Kentucky, US

- Event: NWSL Championship
Washington Spirit	Chicago Red Stars
2	1
- Date: November 20, 2021
- Venue: Lynn Family Stadium, Louisville, Kentucky, U.S.
- Most Valuable Player: Aubrey Bledsoe (Washington Spirit)
- Referee: Tori Penso
- Attendance: 10,360

The 2021 NWSL Championship was the eighth edition of the NWSL Championship, the championship match of the National Women's Soccer League (NWSL), and took place on November 20, 2021. The Washington Spirit won 2–1 against the Chicago Red Stars in extra time, becoming NWSL champions for the first time. The match was played at Lynn Family Stadium in Louisville, Kentucky.

== Road to the final ==
=== Washington Spirit ===
After the COVID-19 pandemic disrupted the 2020 season (during which they came second in the 2020 NWSL Challenge Cup round robin phase), the Washington Spirit placed third in the 2021 regular-season standings. They were led by NWSL Golden Boot winner Ashley Hatch, NWSL Goalkeeper of the Year winner Aubrey Kingsbury, and NWSL Rookie of the Year winner Trinity Rodman. Head coach Richie Burke was fired during the season for anti-harassment policy violations. They also forfeited two games due to COVID-19 policy violations. Despite that, they returned to the playoffs for the first time since 2016. In the first round of the playoffs, Hatch scored a 1–0 stoppage-time winner against her former team, the defending double champion and sixth seed North Carolina Courage. In the semifinals, goals scored by Rodman and Ashley Sanchez gave Washington a 2–1 win over the two seed OL Reign, sending the Spirit to their second NWSL final.

=== Chicago Red Stars ===
After the pandemic-disrupted 2020 season (during which they reached the 2020 NWSL Challenge Cup final), the Chicago Red Stars placed fourth in the 2021 regular-season standings. In the first round of the playoffs, Mallory Pugh scored the only goal of the 1–0 win over fifth seed Gotham FC. In the semifinals, which they played without Pugh due to COVID-19 protocols, the Red Stars won 2–0 over NWSL Shield holders Portland Thorns FC, with goals from Katie Johnson and Sarah Woldmoe, to reach their second consecutive NWSL final after the 2019 NWSL Championship.

== Match ==
=== Details ===
November 20, 2021
12:00 ET

Washington Spirit	2–1 (a.e.t.)	Chicago Red Stars
Sullivan 67' (pen.); O'Hara 97'	Report	Hill 45+5'

Lynn Family Stadium, Louisville, Kentucky
Attendance: 10,360
Referee: Tori Penso

Washington Spirit	Chicago Red Stars

GK	1	(United States) Aubrey Bledsoe
LB	9	(United States) Tegan McGrady		(substituted off) 46'
CB	3	(United States) Sam Staab
CB	6	(United States) Emily Sonnett
RB	5	(United States) Kelley O'Hara
DM	19	(United States) Dorian Bailey		(substituted off) 119'
DM	12	(United States) Andi Sullivan (c)
AM	10	(United States) Ashley Sanchez		(substituted off) 88'
LW	27	(United States) Tara McKeown		(substituted off) 74'
FW	33	(United States) Ashley Hatch		(substituted off) 116'
RW	2	(United States) Trinity Rodman
Substitutes:
GK	18	(Canada) Devon Kerr
FW	7	(Japan) Saori Takarada		(substituted on) 116'
DF	14	(United States) Paige Nielsen		(substituted on) 119'
DF	16	(Sweden) Julia Roddar	(yellow card) 101'	(substituted on) 46'
FW	17	(Japan) Kumi Yokoyama
FW	20	(Venezuela) Mariana Speckmaier
DF	21	(United States) Anna Heilferty		(substituted on) 74'
MF	26	(United States) Taylor Aylmer		(substituted on) 88'
DF	30	(United States) Camryn Biegalski
Manager:
(United States) Kris Ward

GK	38	(United States) Cassie Miller
LB	3	(United States) Arin Wright
CB	26	(United States) Tierna Davidson
CB	11	(United States) Sarah Gorden
RB	23	(United States) Tatumn Milazzo	(substituted off) 91'
DM	16	(United States) Sarah Woldmoe
DM	13	(United States) Morgan Gautrat
AM	10	(United States) Vanessa DiBernardo (c)	(substituted off) 13'
LW	9	(United States) Mallory Pugh	(substituted off) 46'
FW	33	(Mexico) Katie Johnson
RW	5	(United States) Rachel Hill	(substituted off) 79'
Substitutes:
GK	21	(United States) Emily Boyd
FW	4	(United States) Alyssa Mautz	(substituted on) 79'
MF	7	(United States) Nikki Stanton	(substituted on) 116'
DF	14	(United States) Zoe Morse
FW	15	(United States) Makenzy Doniak	(substituted on) 15'
DF	22	(Canada) Bianca St-Georges	(substituted on) 91' (substituted off) 116'
MF	24	(United States) Danielle Colaprico	(substituted on) 46'
DF	28	(United States) Kayla Sharples
DF	32	(United States) Zoey Goralski
Manager:
(England) Rory Dames

Most Valuable Player:
(United States) Aubrey Bledsoe

Assistant referees:
Tiffini Turpin (United States)
Kali Smith (United States)
Fourth official:
Natalie Simon (United States)

Match rules

- 90 minutes.
- 30 minutes of extra time if necessary.
- Penalty shootout if scores still level.
- Maximum of five substitutions.
