= Andi Sullivan =

American soccer player (born 1995)

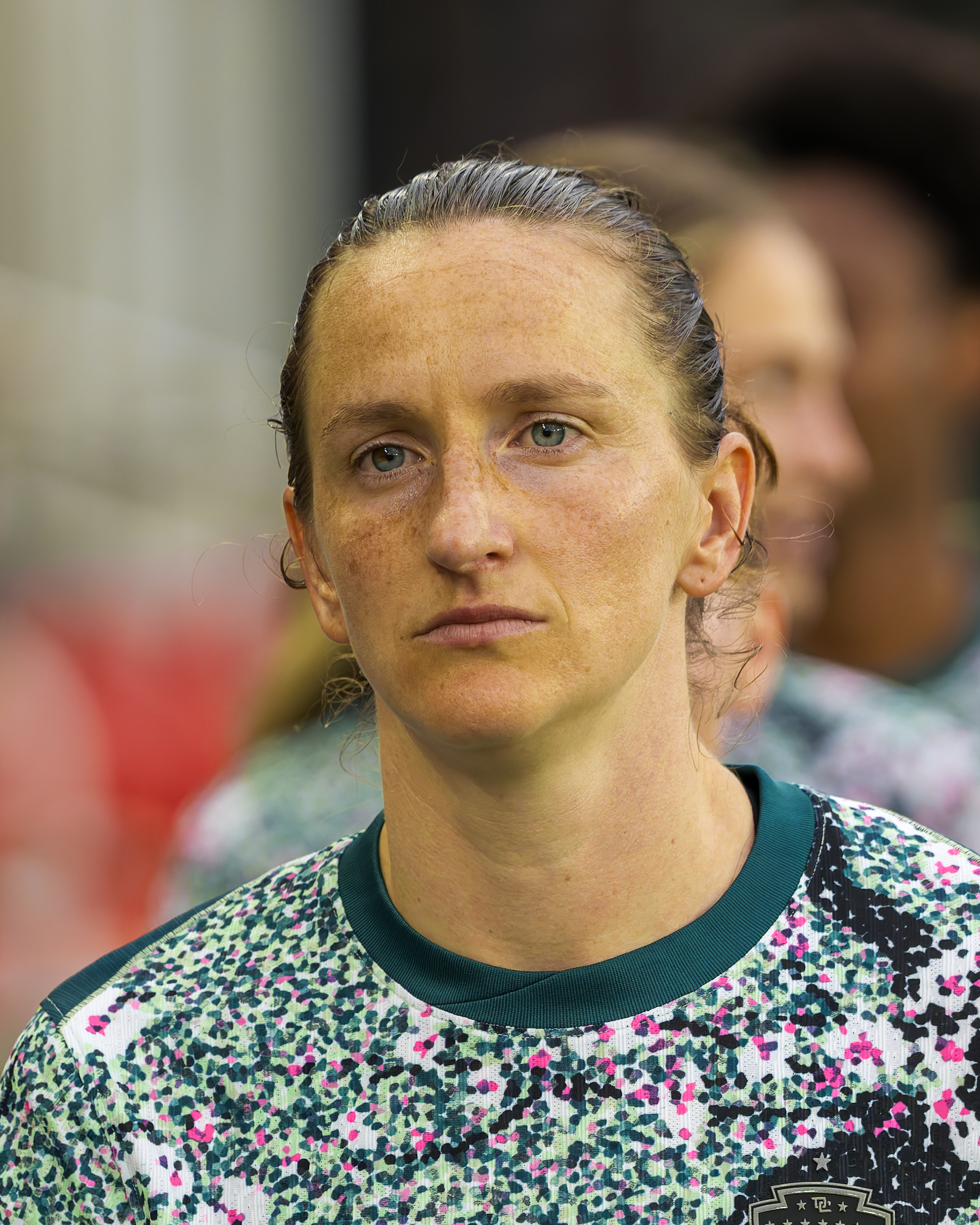
- Sullivan with the Washington Spirit in 2026

Personal information
- Full name: Andi Maureen Sullivan
- Date of birth: December 20, 1995 (age 30)
- Place of birth: Honolulu, Hawaii, U.S.
- Height: 5 ft 7 in (1.70 m)
- Position: Midfielder

Team information
- Current team: Washington Spirit
- Number: 12

Youth career
- Bethesda Soccer Club
- McLean Youth Soccer
- Lee Mount Vernon Sports Club

College career
Years	Team	Apps	(Gls)
2014–2017	Stanford Cardinal	87	(20)

Senior career*
Years	Team	Apps	(Gls)
2012–2015	Washington Spirit Reserves		
2018–	Washington Spirit	141	(8)

International career^{‡}
2011–2012	United States U-17		
2013–2014	United States U-20		
2015–2018	United States U-23		
2016–	United States	52	(3)
- * Club domestic league appearances and goals as of 05:30, November 15, 2026 (UTC) ‡ National team caps and goals as of October 26, 2023

Andi Maureen Sullivan (born December 20, 1995) is an American professional soccer player who plays as a midfielder for the Washington Spirit of the National Women's Soccer League (NWSL) and the United States national team.

Sullivan played college soccer for the Stanford Cardinal, where she won an NCAA championship and the Hermann Trophy in 2017. She was drafted first overall by the Spirit in the 2018 NWSL College Draft. She won an NWSL Championship with the Spirit in 2021.

Sullivan made her senior international debut for the United States in 2016. She represented her country at the 2023 FIFA Women's World Cup.

== Early life ==
Raised in Lorton, Virginia, Sullivan is the youngest of four siblings and attended South County High School. She played club soccer for Lee Mount Vernon, Bethesda Soccer Club (Freedom) and McLean Youth Soccer. In 2013, she was named the national Youth Player of the Year by the National Soccer Coaches Association of America (NSCAA). Top Drawer Soccer ranked her as the top college recruit.

== College career ==
During her freshman season in 2014, Sullivan started in 23 of the 24 matches in which she played. She scored her first goal for the Cardinal during a match against University of Dayton and served four assists throughout the season ranking third on the team. She made the All-Freshman First Team for Top Drawer Soccer, as well as the Pac-12 First Team and NSCAA All-Pacific Region Second Team. She was also awarded Pac-12 Freshman of the Year and named National Freshman of the Year by Top Drawer Soccer and Soccer America.

As a sophomore, Sullivan played and started in all 23 games. She scored 5 goals, including three game-winners, and provided 2 assists. As a junior, Sullivan led Stanford in points (29), goals (11) and game-winning goals (4). She was named the Pac-12 Player of the Year and earned All-Pac-12 first team honors for the third consecutive season.

As a senior, Sullivan tallied three goals and six assists and led Stanford to their second national championship, scoring in the College Cup final. She won the Hermann Trophy, after being a finalist in 2016 and a semifinalist in 2015.

== Club career ==
Sullivan played in the USL W-League during the 2012–2015 seasons. She played with D.C. United Women in 2012, which was later renamed the Washington Spirit Reserves for the 2013–2015 seasons.

=== Washington Spirit ===
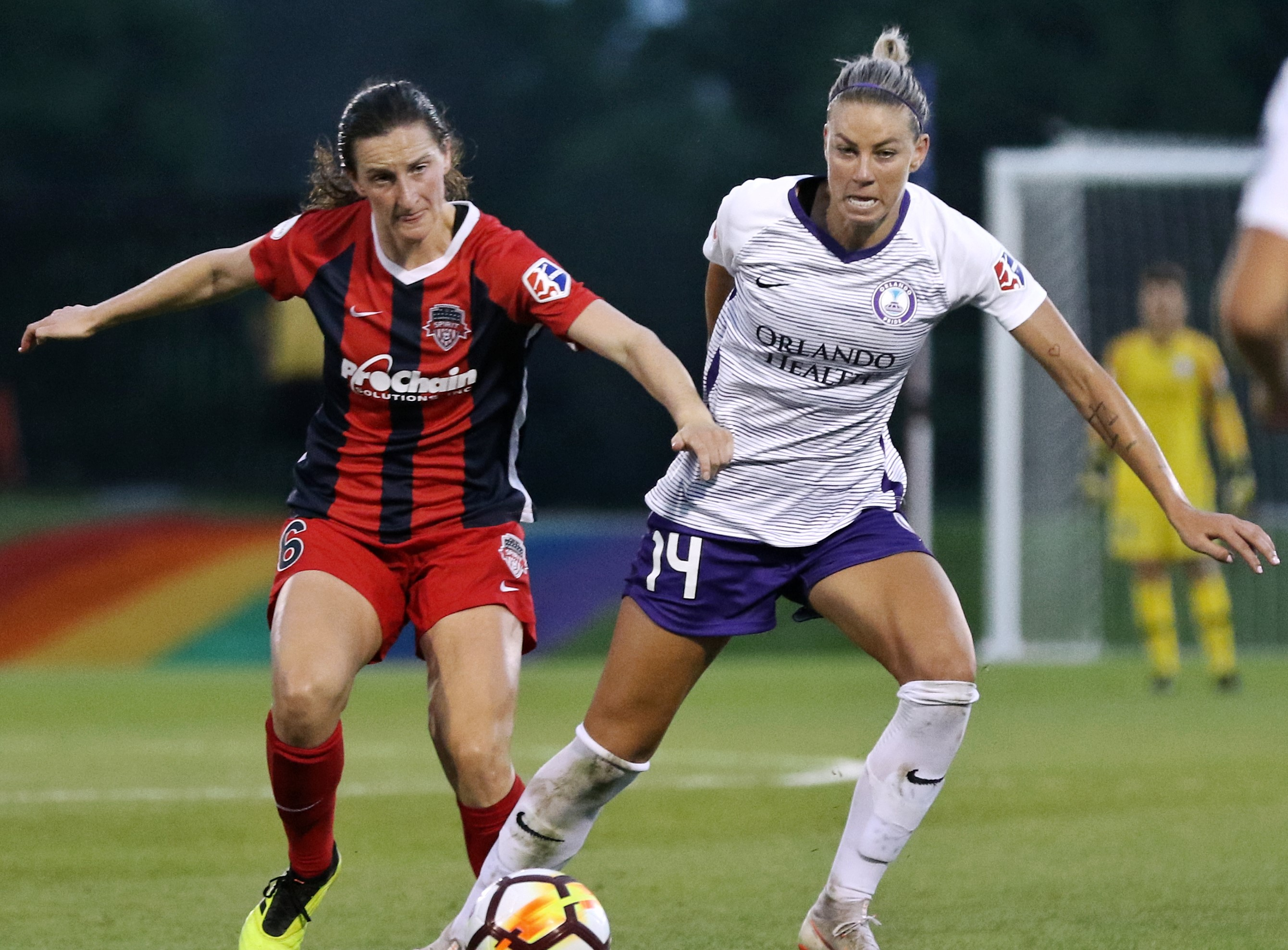
Sullivan (left) and Alanna Kennedy fight for the ball in a match between Washington Spirit and Orlando Pride on June 23, 2018.

On January 18, 2018, Sullivan was selected as the number one overall draft pick at the 2018 NWSL College Draft by the Washington Spirit. Sullivan appeared in every game for the Spirit, except for the last game of the season which she missed as she was completing in the Nordic Cup with U.S. U-23. Sullivan was named a finalist for NWSL Rookie of the Year, finishing second in voting behind winner Imani Dorsey. Sullivan returned to Washington for the 2019 NWSL season and was named team captain. On January 9, 2020, she re-signed with the Spirit.

At the beginning of the 2021 NWSL Season, Sullivan once again re-signed with Washington, inking a two-year deal. She went on to captain the Spirit to the club's first-ever NWSL Championship title in a 2–1 comeback victory over the Chicago Red Stars. Sullivan converted the match's equalizer in the 67th minute, firing a penalty kick past opposing goalkeeper Cassie Miller to draw the two teams level. On June 20, 2023, Sullivan and the Spirit agreed on a new three-year deal with a team option for 2026.

In April 2024, Sullivan reached 100 regular season NWSL appearances. She started in all of the Spirit's NWSL games until mid-October, where she suffered an injury during a match versus the Orlando Pride. The Washington Spirit later announced that Sullivan had torn her ACL and would be placed on the season-ending injury list, missing the rest of the regular season and playoffs. She had previously suffered an ACL tear 8 years earlier, in October 2017.

Sullivan remained affiliated with the Spirit during the 2025 season while she was on maternity leave. The Spirit resigned Sullivan for the 2026 season, her ninth with the Spirit. At the start of the 2026 season, Sullivan had 134 total appearances with the Spirit, with ten goals and six assists over more than 11,000 minutes of play.

== International career ==
=== Youth ===
Sullivan has represented the United States on the senior national team as well as the under-15, under-17, under-20, and under-23 national teams. Sullivan competed for the United States at the 2012 CONCACAF Women's U-17 Championship in Guatemala where she helped the under-17 national team win gold. Despite being the youngest player on the under-20 national team roster at the 2014 CONCACAF Women's U-20 Championship, she co-captained the team to a 2014 FIFA U-20 Women's World Cup berth.

On August 23, 2018, she was named to the United States U-23 team for the 2018 Nordic tournament.

=== Senior ===
She earned her first cap with the senior national team during an international friendly match against Switzerland on October 19, 2016, and earned Player of the Match for her impressive performance. She earned her first assist a few days later on October 23, 2016. She then played in two more matches on November 10 and 13 where she earned another assist. However, she tore her ACL a few days later during a college match on November 18, 2016. She missed a large part of the year due to the injury but made her return to the national team on October 19, 2017.

Sullivan was named to the 23-player roster for the 2018 SheBelieves Cup, the U.S. won the tournament for the second time. She was on the 35-player provisional roster for the 2018 CONCACAF Women's Championship but was not named to the final 20-player roster.

In 2019, Sullivan was originally not included on the January camp roster but was added to the roster by head coach Jill Ellis. She was also named to the team for the 2019 SheBelieves Cup.

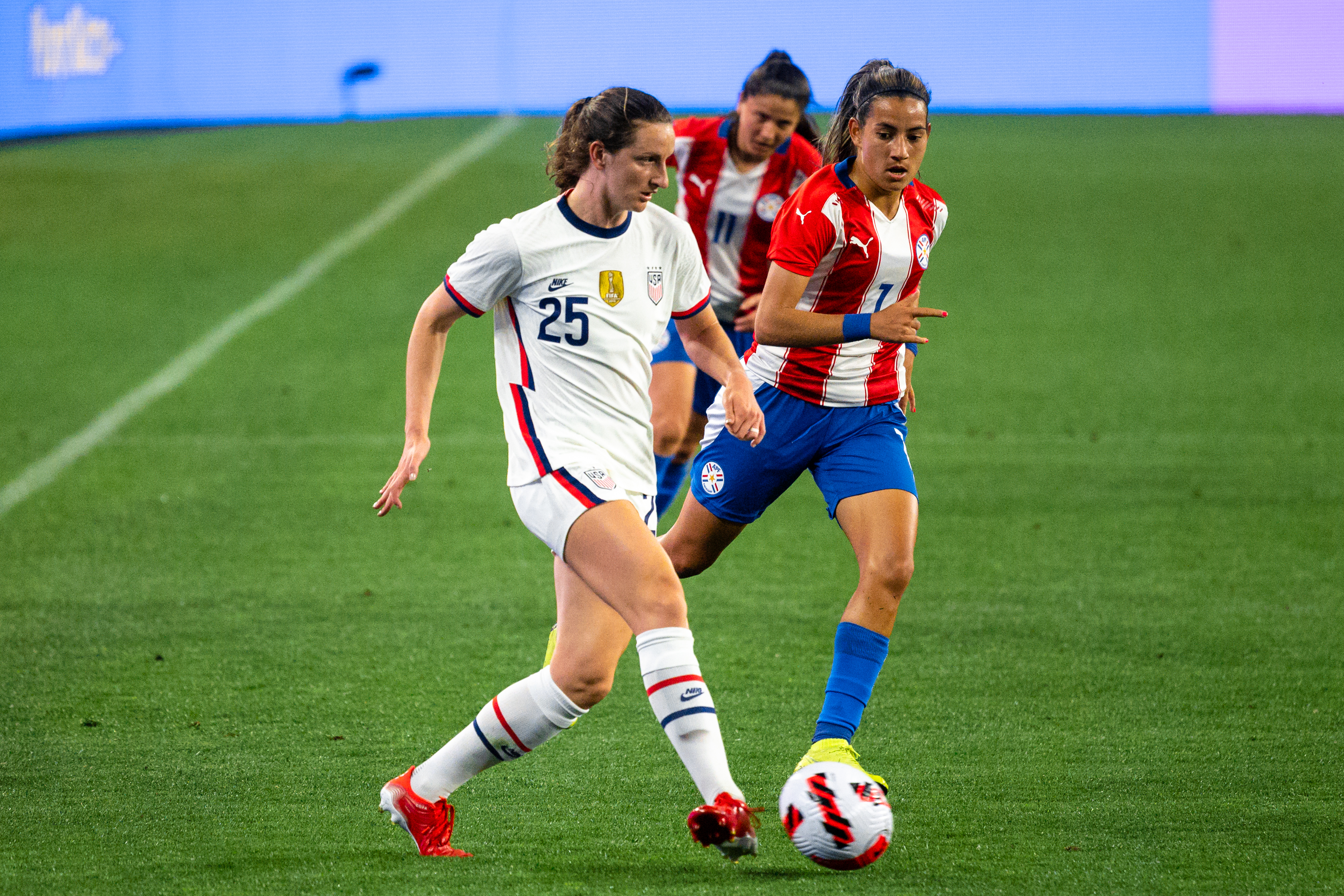
Sullivan playing for the United States in 2021

After not being in the squad for the 2019 FIFA Women's World Cup or 2020 Summer Olympics, Sullivan was called back in to the national team by head coach Vlatko Andonovski. Alongside fellow non-olympians Mallory Pugh and Sophia Smith, Sullivan was added to an absence-heavy squad for two September 2021 friendlies against Paraguay. She started both games, scoring her first two international goals and tallying an assist during the first match.

Sullivan was included in the United States' 23-player roster for the 2023 FIFA Women's World Cup. She played in every minute of the four games the Americans competed in. Ultimately, the USWNT were eliminated in a round of 16 penalty shootout to Sweden following a scoreless 0–0 draw.

== Personal life ==
On December 14, 2019, Sullivan married Drew Skundrich. On Feb. 14, 2025, they announced that they were expecting a baby girl. Sullivan and Skundrich announced in July, 2025 that their daughter had been born.

== Career statistics ==
=== Club ===
As of May 1, 2024

Club	Season	League			Cup (Note: Includes the NWSL Challenge Cup)		Playoffs (Note: Includes NWSL Playoffs and A-League Women Finals series)		Other		Total	
Club	Season	Division	Apps	Goals	Apps	Goals	Apps	Goals	Apps	Goals	Apps	Goals
Washington Spirit	2018	NWSL	23	0	—		—		—		23	0
Washington Spirit	2019	NWSL	23	2	—		—		—		23	2
Washington Spirit	2020	NWSL	—		4	0	—		0 (Note: Includes the NWSL Fall Series)	0	4	0
Washington Spirit	2021	NWSL	19	2	2	0	3	1	—		24	3
Washington Spirit	2022	NWSL	12	1	4	1	—		—		16	2
Washington Spirit	2023	NWSL	19	0	1	0	—		—		20	0
Washington Spirit	2024	NWSL	7	1	—		—		—		7	1
Career total			103	6	11	1	3	1	0	0	117	8

=== International ===
As of match played October 26, 2023

National team	Year	Apps	Goals
United States
United States	2016	4	0
United States	2017	3	0
United States	2018	4	0
United States	2019	4	0
United States	2020	1	0
United States	2021	6	2
United States	2022	15	1
United States	2023	15	0
Total		52	3

Scores and results list United States's goal tally first, score column indicates score after each Sullivan goal.

List of international goals scored by Andi Sullivan
No.	Date	Venue	Opponent	Score	Result	Competition	Ref.
1	September 16, 2021	Cleveland, Ohio, U.S.	Paraguay	3–0	9–0	Friendly	
2	September 16, 2021	Cleveland, Ohio, U.S.	Paraguay	7–0	9–0	Friendly	
3	April 9, 2022	Columbus, Ohio, U.S.	Uzbekistan	1–0	9–1	Friendly	

== Honors and awards ==
Stanford University

- NCAA Women's Soccer Championship: 2017

Washington Spirit

- NWSL Championship: 2021
- NWSL Challenge Cup: 2025

United States U17

- CONCACAF Women's U-17 Championship: 2012

United States U20

- CONCACAF Women's U-20 Championship: 2014

United States

- CONCACAF Women's Championship: 2022
- CONCACAF Women's Olympic Qualifying Tournament: 2020
- SheBelieves Cup: 2018; 2020; 2022; 2023

Individual

- Pac-12 Freshman of the Year: 2014
- Hermann Trophy: 2017
- Honda Sports Award: 2017
- espnW Player of the Week: November 2016
