= Tara Rudd =

American soccer player (born 1999)

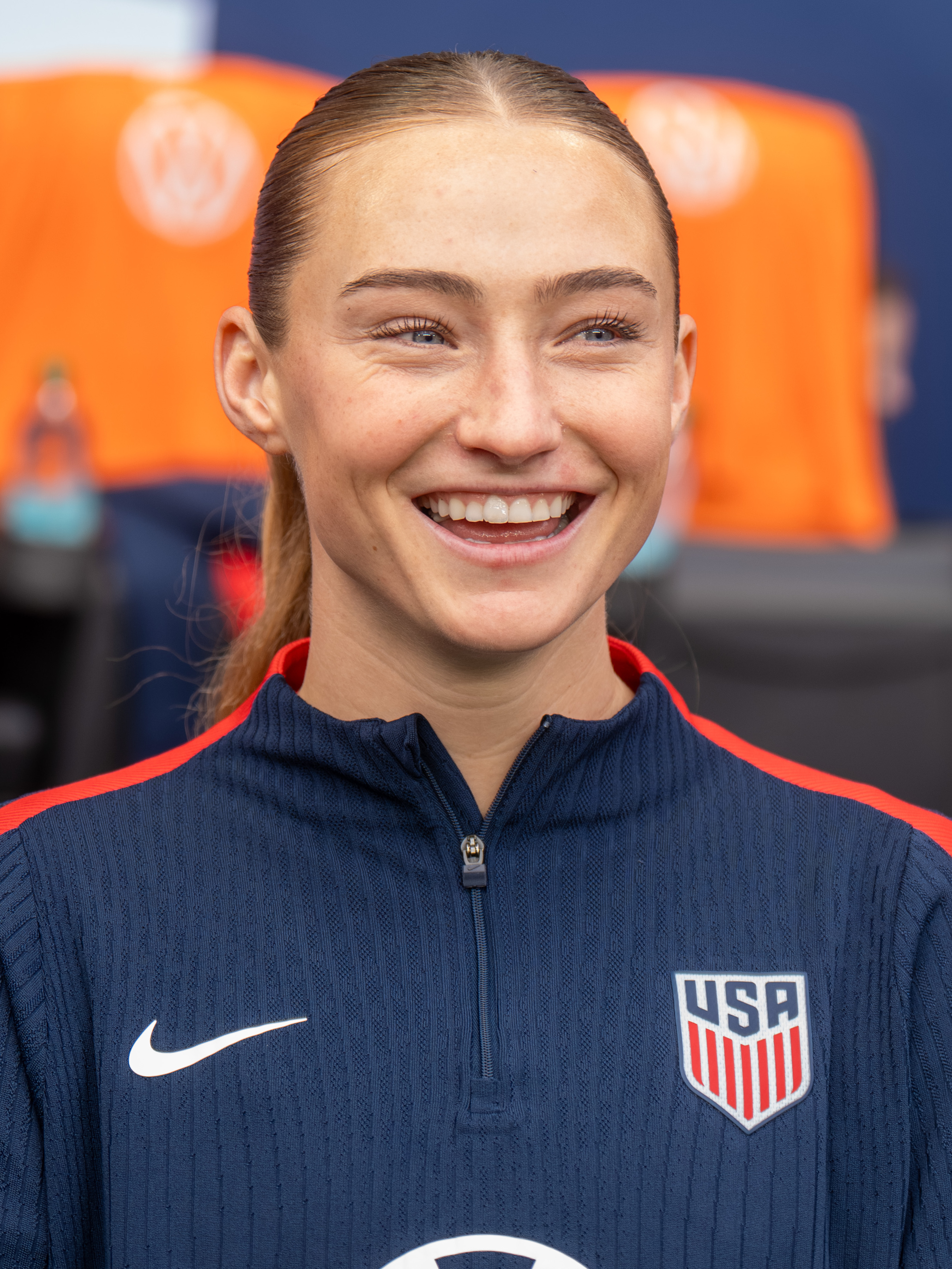
- Rudd with the United States in 2026

Personal information
- Birth name: Tara Leana McKeown
- Date of birth: July 2, 1999 (age 27)
- Place of birth: Newbury Park, California, U.S.
- Height: 5 ft 7 in (1.70 m)
- Position: Center back

Team information
- Current team: Washington Spirit
- Number: 9

College career
Years	Team	Apps	(Gls)
2017–2021	USC Trojans	76	(33)

Senior career*
Years	Team	Apps	(Gls)
2021–	Washington Spirit	134	(8)

International career^{‡}
2017–2018	United States U20		
2019	United States U23		
2025–	United States	12	(0)
- * Club domestic league appearances and goals as of 05:29, November 15, 2026 (UTC) ‡ National team caps and goals as of March 7, 2026

Tara Leana Rudd (née McKeown; born July 2, 1999) is an American professional soccer player who plays as a center back for National Women's Soccer League (NWSL) club Washington Spirit and the United States national team. She played college soccer as a forward for the USC Trojans, earning first-team All-American honors in 2019. She was drafted eighth overall by the Spirit in the 2021 NWSL Draft before being converted to defender in 2023. She was named NWSL Defender of the Year in 2025.

Rudd was a youth international for the United States, appearing at the 2018 FIFA U-20 Women's World Cup, before making her senior debut in 2025.

== Early life ==
Born to Conor and Tracy McKeown in Newbury Park, California, Rudd was raised with two sisters and one brother. She attended Newbury Park High School, where she played soccer and competed in hurdles in track. While playing for Newbury Park, Rudd was a two-time CIF Southern Section first team selection, one-time All-Ventura County first team selection, and was once named the Marmonte League Most Offensive Player. Her efforts helped the team reach the CIF Southern Section Division 2 semifinals for the first time in school history. She was named the 29th-best recruit in the class of 2017 by IMG Soccer Academy, and named eighth overall across Southern California.

== College career ==
Rudd attended the University of Southern California and featured in 76 matches for the Trojans from 2017 to 2021. In her freshman year, Rudd appeared in all 20 games during the season and was included 2017 Pac-12 All-Freshman team. In her junior year, Rudd transitioned from playing as a fullback to a forward. She finished the year with 15 goals and 8 assists, getting named the 2019 Pac-12 Forward of the Year and becoming a semifinalist for the Mac Hermann Trophy. In her final year of college, Rudd started all 14 games and led the team in assists.

== Club career ==
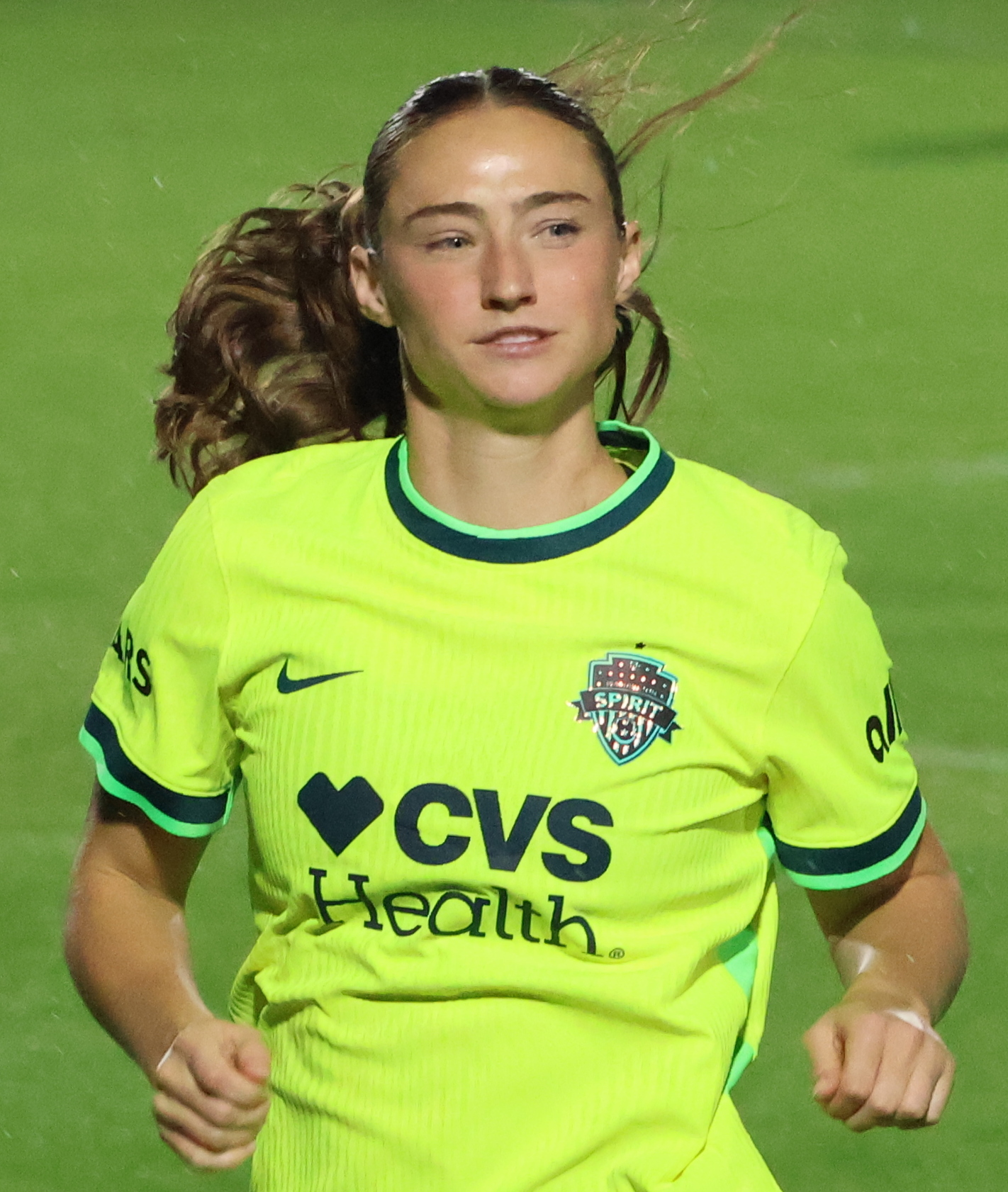
Rudd with the Washington Spirit in 2025

The Washington Spirit selected Rudd with the eighth overall pick in the first round of the 2021 NWSL Draft. Earlier, the Spirit had traded $100,000 in NWSL allocation money and its second-round pick in the 2022 NWSL Draft to Sky Blue FC in order to obtain the pick. After being selected, Rudd chose to play in her final year with USC before joining the Spirit after the college soccer season concluded.

On May 15, 2021, the Spirit signed Rudd to a two-year contract with an option for a third year. The next day, she made her NWSL debut, coming on as an 87th-minute substitute for Ashley Sanchez in a 1–1 draw with the Orlando Pride. On September 26, 2021, Rudd scored her first goal for the Spirit in a game vs Kansas City in a 2–1 victory. Later in the season, Rudd appeared in the 2021 NWSL Championship, helping the Spirit beat the Chicago Red Stars in a 2–1 result and earn the first NWSL Championship win in club history. Rudd directly contributed to the victory, drawing the game-winning penalty in the 66th minute of the match after being fouled by Tierna Davidson.

On January 19, 2023, the Spirit announced that the club had re-signed Rudd on a three-year contract with a team option for 2026. At the start of the 2023 NWSL season, Rudd was converted from a forward into a center back. Spirit general manager Mark Krikorian proposed the change with an eye toward making the national team as a defender. She played in 21 of the 22 regular season matches for the Spirit, leading the NWSL in clearances. On June 21, 2023, Rudd was selected as the NWSL Player of the Week for both her defensive contributions and after scoring two goals across multiple competitions.

Rudd played every minute of the 2024 season for the Spirit, becoming an iron woman for the first time. During the Spirit's quarterfinal playoff game against Bay FC, Rudd scored a goal from outside the box in the 86th minute. Her strike equalized the score at 1–1, pushing the game into extra time. The Spirit would later go on to win the match 2–1, advancing to the semifinals. Washington went to on advance to the championship game, losing to the Orlando Pride.

Washington got some revenge for their championship loss by defeating Orlando in the 2025 NWSL Challenge Cup on penalties. Rudd scored the winning penalty kick in the shootout. She played her 100th NWSL match on August 9, 2025, in a 0–0 draw against Gotham FC at the age of 26. She was named NWSL Defender of the Year at the end of the season.

== International career ==
Rudd has played internationally for the United States women's national under-20 soccer team. On July 17, 2018, Rudd was named to the roster for the 2018 FIFA U-20 Women's World Cup, alongside USC teammate Savannah DeMelo. Rudd appeared in the starting lineup for the United States in the team's second group stage match, versus Paraguay.

In 2018, also with United States women's national under-20 soccer team , she experienced her first international tournament during the 2018 FIFA U-20 Women's World Cup which took place in Brest in the department of Finistère in the region Brittany located in France

In 2019, Rudd was a member of the United States women's national under-23 soccer team. She was part of the squad that participated in the 2019 Women’s International U-23 La Manga Tournament. Rudd was the lone goalscorer for the United States in its second match of the competition, a 3–1 loss against France. The goal was Rudd's first international goal at any level.

Rudd received her first call-up to the senior national team in January 2025. She earned her first cap on February 20, 2025 in a SheBelieves Cup game against Colombia, a 2–0 win.

== Personal life ==
In December 2025, she married Carson Rudd, a baseball player in the Cincinnati Reds minor league system. It was announced that she would begin playing using her married name, Tara Rudd, in 2026.

== Career statistics ==
=== Club ===
As of February 9, 2025

Appearances and goals by club, season and competition
Club	Season	League			Cup (Note: Includes the NWSL Challenge Cup)		Playoffs (Note: Includes NWSL Playoffs)		Other		Total	
Club	Season	Division	Apps	Goals	Apps	Goals	Apps	Goals	Apps	Goals	Apps	Goals
Washington Spirit	2021	NWSL	20	1	0	0	3	0	—		23	1
Washington Spirit	2022	NWSL	12	3	2	0	—		—		14	3
Washington Spirit	2023	NWSL	21	1	4	1	—		—		25	2
Washington Spirit	2024	NWSL	26	0	—		3	1	3 (Note: Includes the NWSL x Liga MX Femenil Summer Cup)	0	32	1
Career total			79	5	6	1	6	1	3	0	94	7

=== International ===
As of match played March 7, 2026

National Team	Year	Apps	Goals
United States	2025	9	0
United States	2026	3	0
Total		12	0

== Honors ==
United States

- SheBelieves Cup: 2026

Washington Spirit

- NWSL Championship: 2021
- NWSL Challenge Cup: 2025

Individual

- NWSL Defender of the Year: 2025
- NWSL Best XI First Team: 2025
- NWSL Best XI Second Team: 2024
