= Anna Heilferty =

American soccer player (born 1999)

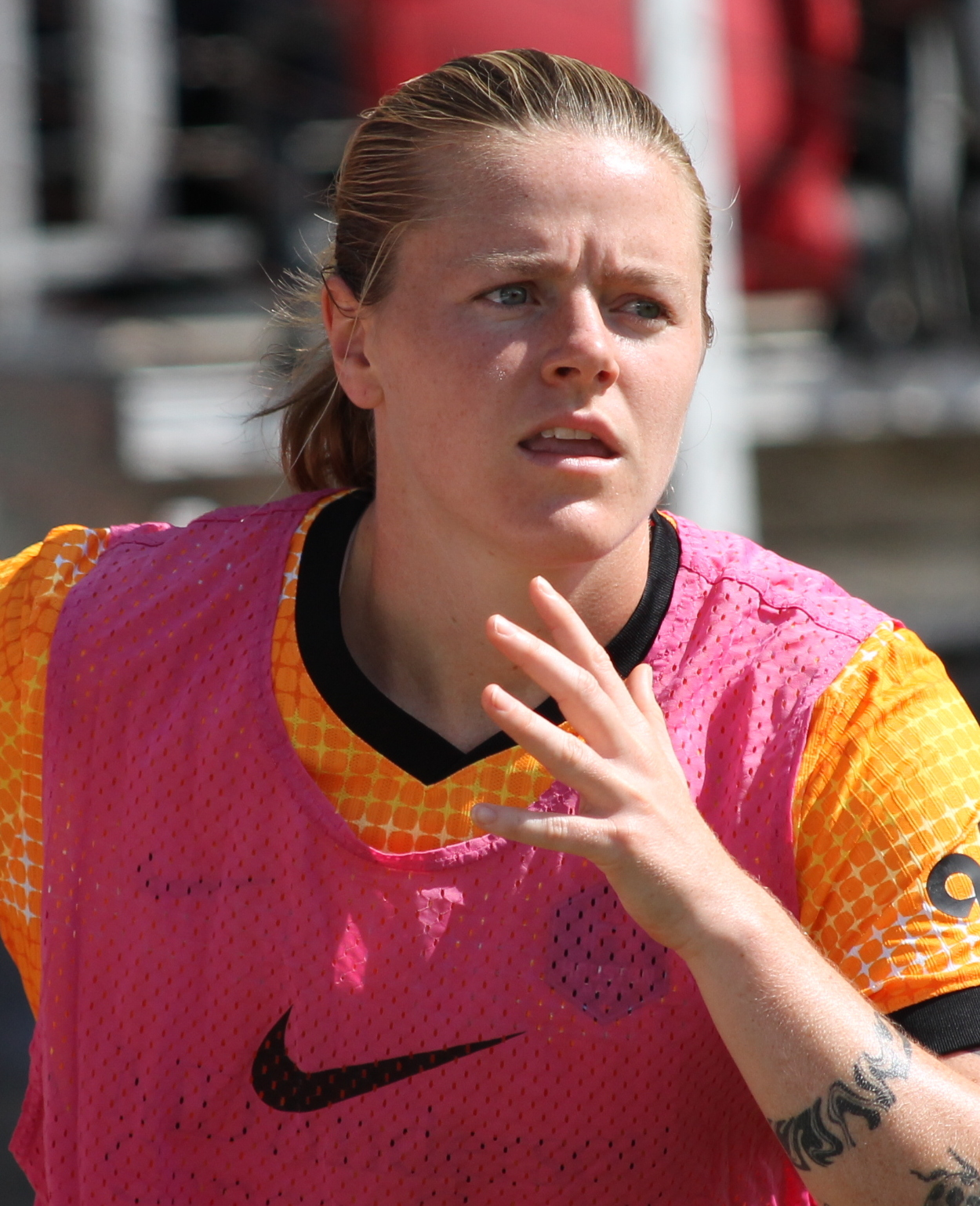
- Heilferty with the Houston Dash in 2025

Personal information
- Date of birth: April 17, 1999 (age 27)
- Place of birth: Falls Church, Virginia, U.S.
- Height: 5 ft 4 in (1.63 m)
- Positions: Defender; midfielder

Team information
- Current team: Montreal Roses

College career
Years	Team	Apps	(Gls)
2017–2020	Boston University Terriers	62	(13)

Senior career*
Years	Team	Apps	(Gls)
2021–2024	Washington Spirit	42	(0)
2025	Houston Dash	4	(0)
2026	Tampa Bay Sun	6	(0)
2026–	Montreal Roses	0	(0)

International career
2022	United States U23	2	(0)
- * Club domestic league appearances and goals as of 03:43, May 18, 2026 (UTC)

Anna Heilferty (born April 17, 1999) is an American professional soccer player who plays as a defender or midfielder for Northern Super League club Montreal Roses FC. She played college soccer for the Boston University Terriers and was selected by the Washington Spirit in the second round of the 2021 NWSL Draft.

== Early life ==
Heilferty is a native of Falls Church, Virginia, and attended Justice High School, then named JEB Stuart High School. The Washington Post named her its high school women's soccer player of the year in 2017.

== College career ==
Heilferty attended Boston University, where she played for the Boston University Terriers women's soccer team. She made 62 appearances, and scored 13 goals and 10 assists. The Patriot League named her its rookie of the year in 2017, and in 2018 named her the Patriot League Tournament's most valuable player and to the All-Patriot League first team. Initially playing as an attacker and leading the team in goals and assists as a sophomore, she moved to left back in her junior year.

== Club career ==
=== Washington Spirit ===
Heilferty, a fan of the Washington Spirit as a child, trained with the team during the COVID-19 pandemic in 2020. The Spirit selected her with the 19th-overall pick in the 2021 NWSL Draft. She was the first Boston University player to be drafted into the NWSL. Heilferty made her professional debut on April 10, 2021, in the 2021 NWSL Challenge Cup. The team played her in multiple positions, including on both wings, at left back, and as a midfielder. She played 47 minutes as a substitute for Tara McKeown in the 2021 NWSL Championship match against the Chicago Red Stars, which the Spirit won 2–1. On January 17, 2023, the Spirit extended Heilferty's contract through 2024 with an option for an additional year. The team also officially converted her to a defender. On February 25, 2023, the Spirit announced that Heilferty would miss the 2023 season due to an anterior cruciate ligament injury suffered during preseason.

Heilferty made her return to the pitch on March 23, 2024, in the Spirit's 2024 home opener match against Bay FC. In her second match back from injury, Heilferty suffered a season-ending ACL tear on April 26. It would be Heilferty's second ACL injury in just over a year. At the end of the season, Heilferty's option was declined and she was rendered a free agent.

=== Houston Dash ===
On September 12, 2025, Heilferty signed with the Houston Dash through the end of the 2025 NWSL season. She made her Dash debut on September 19, coming on as an 80th-minute substitute in a match against Chicago Stars FC. Six minutes after entering the match, Heilferty earned a penalty kick after forcing a handball from an opposing defender; the ensuing attempt by Dash teammate Yazmeen Ryan was saved by Alyssa Naeher and the match ended 1–0 in Houston's favor.

=== Tampa Bay Sun ===
In April 2026, USL Super League club Tampa Bay Sun FC signed Heilferty as a free agent. Heilferty made 6 appearances for Tampa Bay as the Sun finished second-to-last in the standings. On June 12, 2026, the Sun announced that Heilferty would not be returning to the club for the next season.

=== Montreal Roses ===
Canadian club Montreal Roses FC announced, on September 8, 2026, that they had signed Heilferty through the remainder of the Northern Super League season.

== International career ==
The United States under-23 national team selected Heilferty for the 2022 Three-Nations Tournament in Sweden.

== Personal life ==
On May 12, 2022, Heilferty joined the Department of Energy and Environment as the first ambassador for the Government of the District of Columbia's Sustainable DC environmental initiative.

== Career statistics ==
=== Club ===
As of June 12, 2026

Appearances and goals by club, season and competition
Club	Season	League			Cup (Note: Includes the NWSL Challenge Cup)		Playoffs (Note: Includes NWSL Playoffs)		Total	
Club	Season	Division	Apps	Goals	Apps	Goals	Apps	Goals	Apps	Goals
Washington Spirit	2021	NWSL	19	0	4	0	3	0	26	0
Washington Spirit	2022	NWSL	21	0	8	0	—		29	0
Washington Spirit	2023	NWSL	0	0	0	0	—		0	0
Washington Spirit	2024	NWSL	2	0	—		0	0	2	0
Washington Spirit	Total		42	0	12	0	3	0	57	0
Houston Dash	2025	NWSL	4	0	—		0	0	4	0
Tampa Bay Sun FC	2025–26	USL Super League	6	0	—		—		6	0
Career total			52	0	12	0	3	0	67	0

== Honors ==
Washington Spirit

- NWSL Championship: 2021

Individual

- Patriot League Rookie of the Year: 2017
- Patriot League Tournament MVP: 2018
- All-Patriot League First Team: 2018
