= Tinaya Alexander =

English footballer (born 1999)

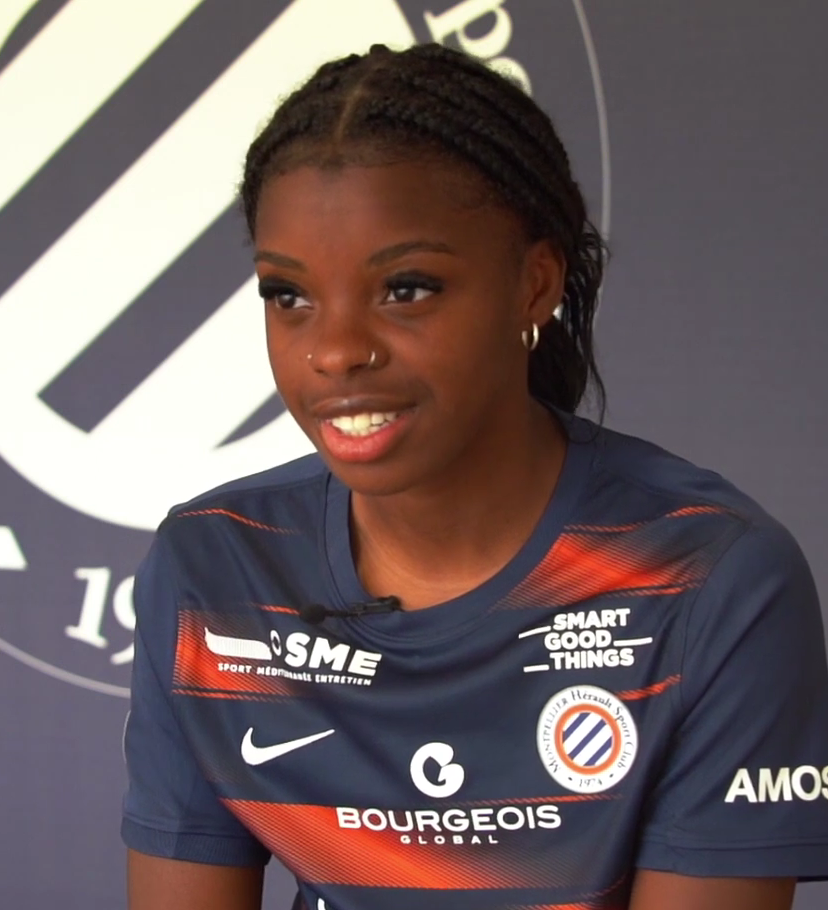
- Alexander in 2022

Personal information
- Full name: Tinaya Chantae Evelyn Alexander
- Date of birth: 15 April 1999 (age 27)
- Place of birth: Reading, Berkshire, England
- Height: 1.61 m (5 ft 3 in)
- Position: Forward

Team information
- Current team: Torreense
- Number: 17

Youth career
- 2013–2017: Arsenal

College career
Years	Team	Apps	(Gls)
2017–2021	LSU Tigers	81	(21)

Senior career*
Years	Team	Apps	(Gls)
2022	Washington Spirit	9	(0)
2022–2023	Montpellier	5	(0)
2023	Reading	1	(0)
2023–2024	London City Lionesses	11	(0)
2024–2025	HB Køge	12	(2)
2025–	Torreense	1	(0)
- * Club domestic league appearances and goals as of 14:09, 30 March 2026 (UTC)

Tinaya Chantae Evelyn Alexander (born 15 April 1999) is an English footballer who plays as a forward for Torreense.

== College career ==
In 2017, Alexander joined the LSU Tigers in the United States. It was announced she would miss the rest of the season with a knee injury.

On 2 November 2021, Alexander was named All-SEC first-team honors, the first player for LSU to do so since Lucy Parker in 2018. Alexander's 22 assists during her time with LSU makes her the joint 2nd highest assister in school history.

== Club career ==
Before the 2022 season, Alexander signed for American side Washington Spirit. She was drafted 14th overall during the Round 2 pick. On 20 March 2022, she debuted for Washington Spirit in the NWSL Challenge Cup during a 0–0 draw with Orlando Pride.

On 20 September 2022, the Spirit transferred Alexander for an undisclosed fee to French club Montpellier HSC. She made her debut against Olympique Lyonnais on 23 September 2022.

On 4 February 2023, Reading announced the signing of Alexander from Montpellier. On 29 June 2023, Reading announced the departure of Alexander.

On 4 August 2023, Alexander was announced at London City Lionesses on a one year contract. On 25 June 2024, it was announced that Alexander would be leaving London City Lionesses when her contract expired.

On 29 August 2024, Alexander was announced at HB Køge on a two year contract.

On 24 September 2025, Alexander joined Campeonato Nacional Feminino side Torreense.
