= Karina Rodríguez (footballer) =

Mexican footballer (born 1999)

Personal information
- Full name: Karina Anaís Rodríguez
- Date of birth: 2 March 1999 (age 27)
- Place of birth: Torrance, California, U.S.
- Height: 1.65 m (5 ft 5 in)
- Position: Centre-back

Team information
- Current team: América
- Number: 3

Youth career
- Torrance Tartars
- So Cal Blues

College career
Years	Team	Apps	(Gls)
2017–2021	UCLA Bruins	73	(4)

Senior career*
Years	Team	Apps	(Gls)
2021–2022	Washington Spirit	12	(0)
2023–	América	126	(1)

International career^{‡}
2014	United States U15		
2016	United States U17	3	(0)
2017–2018	United States U20	7	(0)
2021–	Mexico	21	(0)
Medal record
Women's football
Representing Mexico
Pan American Games
Gold medal – first place	2023 Santiago	Team
- * Club domestic league appearances and goals as of 24 May 2026 ‡ National team caps and goals as of 13 July 2025

Karina Anaís Rodríguez (born 2 March 1999) is a professional footballer who plays as a defender for Liga MX Femenil side Club América. Born in the United States, she represents Mexico at international level.

== Early life ==
Rodríguez was born and raised in Torrance, California. She attended Torrance High School and the University of California, Los Angeles.

== International career ==
Rodríguez represented the United States at the 2016 FIFA U-17 Women's World Cup and the 2018 CONCACAF Women's U-20 Championship. She later switched allegiance to Mexico and made her senior debut on 24 February 2021 in a 0–0 friendly home draw against Costa Rica.

Rodríguez was selected to represent Mexico at the 2023 Pan American Games held in Santiago, Chile, where the Mexican squad went undefeated to won the gold medal for the first time in their history at the Pan American Games, defeating Chile 1–0.

== Personal life ==
Rodríguez's older sister, Anika, is also a professional footballer who also plays for the Mexico women's national football team.

== Honors ==
=== Club ===
Club América

- Liga MX Femenil (2): Clausura 2023, Clausura 2026
- CONCACAF W Champions Cup (1): 2025–26
- Liga MX Femenil: Campeón de Campeonas 2025–26

Washington Spirit

- NWSL (1): 2021

=== International ===
Mexico

- Pan American Games: 2023, gold medal

United States U17

- CONCACAF Women's U-17 Championship: 2016
