= Aubrey Kingsbury =

American soccer player (born 1991)

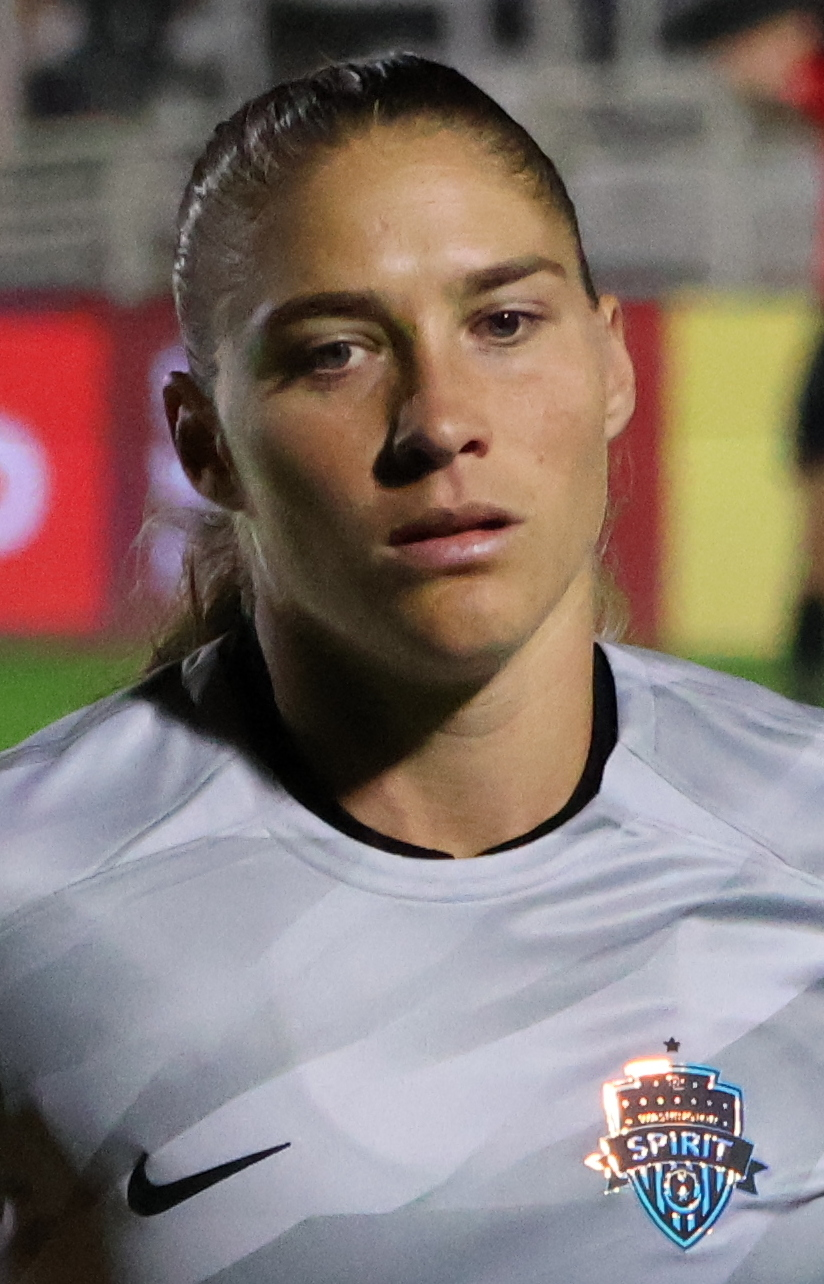
- Kingsbury with the Washington Spirit in 2024

Personal information
- Full name: Aubrey Renee Kingsbury
- Birth name: Aubrey Renee Bledsoe
- Date of birth: November 20, 1991 (age 34)
- Place of birth: Cincinnati, Ohio, United States
- Height: 5 ft 9 in (1.75 m)
- Position: Goalkeeper

Team information
- Current team: Washington Spirit
- Number: 1

Youth career
- Kings Soccer Academy
- St. Ursula Academy

College career
Years	Team	Apps	(Gls)
2010–2013	Wake Forest Demon Deacons		

Senior career*
Years	Team	Apps	(Gls)
2014	Los Angeles Blues		(0)
2014	IK Grand Bodø	11	(0)
2015	Sky Blue FC	1	(0)
2015–2016	→ Fortuna Hjørring (loan)	4	(0)
2016–2017	Orlando Pride	12	(0)
2017–2018	→ Sydney FC (loan)	23	(0)
2018–	Washington Spirit	157	(0)
2019–2020	→ Sydney FC (loan)	14	(0)

International career^{‡}
2014	United States U-23		(0)
2022–	United States	2	(0)
- * Club domestic league appearances and goals as of November 22, 2025 ‡ National team caps and goals as of December 5, 2023

Aubrey Renee Kingsbury (née Bledsoe; born November 20, 1991) is an American professional soccer player who plays as a goalkeeper for the Washington Spirit of the National Women's Soccer League and the United States national team. A two-time NWSL Goalkeeper of the Year, she was named the Most Valuable Player of the Spirit's victory in the 2021 NWSL Championship.

== Early life ==
Kingsbury was born in Cincinnati to Paul and Char Bledsoe. She attended Merwin Elementary, Amelia Middle School, and then St. Ursula Academy where she was a member of the state championship soccer team in 2007 and 2008.

=== Wake Forest Demon Deacons ===
Kingsbury graduated from Wake Forest University with a degree in health and exercise science and minors in chemistry and biology. She started all her games during her four seasons with the Demon Deacons and was named co-captain during her senior year. She holds the Wake Forest career record for shutouts (33), goals against average (0.91), games played and started (94), and minutes played in goal (8,692). She is also one of three Demon Deacons to be named an All-American three times, earning third-team honors from the NSCAA in 2011 and 2012 and second-team honors in 2013.

== Club career ==
=== Los Angeles Blues, 2014 ===
In January 2014, Kingsbury signed for USL W-League side, Los Angeles Blues (previously known as "Pali Blues") in preparation for exploring opportunities in Europe.

=== IK Grand Bodø, 2014 ===
After her stint in LA, Kingsbury secured a move to Norway to play for Toppserien club, IK Grand Bodø. She made 11 appearances for Bodø.

=== Sky Blue, 2015 ===
In October 2014, Kingsbury signed with Sky Blue FC as a discovery player. The 2015 season, Kingsbury backed up starting keeper, Brittany Cameron, limiting her to just a single appearance for Sky Blue.

=== Fortuna Hjørring, 2015–2016 ===
At the conclusion of the 2015 season, Kingsbury secured an off-season loan to Danish club Fortuna Hjørring of the Elitedivisionen along with teammate Nadia Nadim. Competing in the UEFA Women's Champions League, Kingsbury made 4 appearances (2 wins, 1 draw, 1 loss), earning two clean sheets.

=== Orlando Pride, 2016–2017 ===
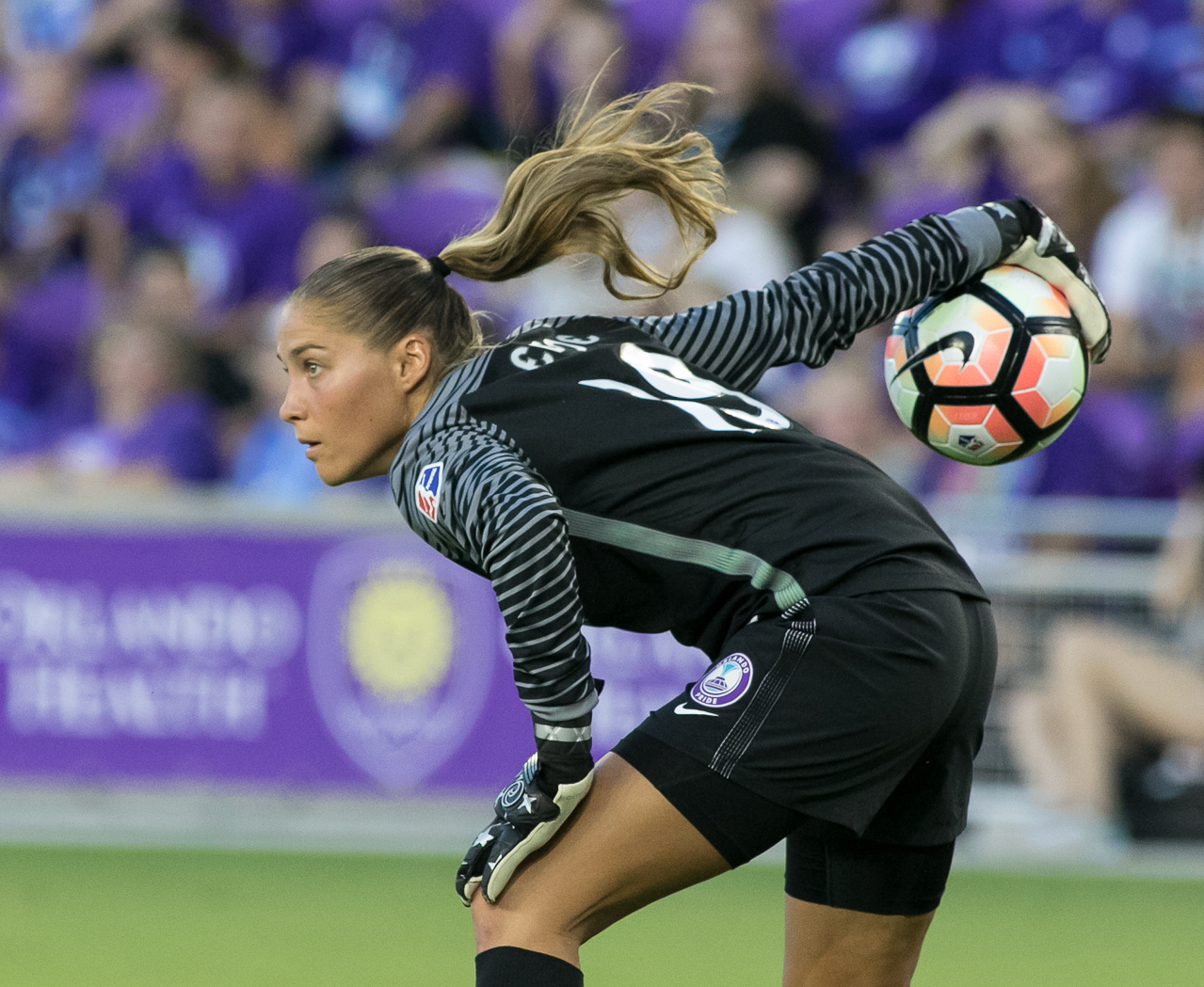
Kingsbury with the Orlando Pride in 2017

On November 2, 2015, Kingsbury was selected by Orlando Pride as their 10th pick in the NWSL expansion draft. She joined the Pride at the conclusion of her loan spell at Fortuna. Deputising for Ashlyn Harris, Kingsbury made a single appearance during the 2016 season. When Harris got injured during the 2017 season, Kingsbury made a string of starts for the Pride, registering 11 appearances, earning 5 wins and 2 clean sheets.

==== Sydney FC (loan) ====
On November 28, 2017, Kingsbury joined Sydney FC for the remainder of the 2017–18 W-League.

=== Washington Spirit, 2018–present ===
In January 2018, Orlando traded Kingsbury and a 2019 first round draft pick to Washington Spirit in exchange for Canadian national defender, Shelina Zadorsky. On June 19, 2018, Kingsbury was named Player of the Week by the NWSL Media Association for Weeks 11 and 12. Kingsbury led the Spirit to back-to-back shutouts, and saved a Megan Rapinoe penalty kick during those weeks. She went on to break the NWSL league leading save record, surpassing the previous record held by Alyssa Naeher. She was one of three nominees for NWSL Goalkeeper of the Year for the 2018 season.

Kingsbury re-signed for the Washington Spirit's 2019 season in September 2018. In Week 4 of the 2019 NWSL season Kingsbury won both NWSL Player and Save of the Week. She led the NWSL with 86 saves and was voted the NWSL Goalkeeper of the Year for the 2019 season.

Due to the COVID-19 pandemic, the NWSL organized a closed-door NWSL Challenge Cup in the summer, which was followed by the NWSL Fall Series. Kingsbury started in all five of the Spirit's games during the Challenge Cup. During the quarterfinals, the Spirit played to a scoreless draw against Sky Blue FC. In the ensuing penalty kick shootout, Kingsbury made a save against Domi Richardson, but ultimately the Spirit only converted three of their five penalty kicks and the team fell to Sky Blue. Kingsbury played every minute of the Spirit's four games in NWSL Fall Series. Against 16 total shots, she made 12 saves and conceded 4 goals. In the 87th of Washington's game against the Chicago Red Stars, Kingsbury, on the ground, kicked Dani Rhodes' rebound away to prevent Chicago from the taking the lead. Washington ultimately won the game thanks to Jessie Scarpa's 92nd-minute goal. Additionally, Kingsbury led the Spirit to a clean sheet against Sky Blue.

Kingsbury was voted Goalkeeper of the Year for a second time following the 2021 season. She was voted Most Valuable Player of the 2021 championship game in which the Spirit defeated the Chicago Red Stars 2–1 in overtime.

Kingsbury was sent off in second-half stoppage time of the opening matchday against the Seattle Reign on March 21, 2024; however, the call was later rescinded by the NWSL. Except for the last moments of that game, she played every minute of the season as the Spirit finished in second place. On November 16, 2024, after the Spirit drew NJ/NY Gotham FC 1–1 in the NWSL semifinals, Kingsbury saved all three penalty attempts she faced to help send the Spirit to the final.

Kingsbury made one penalty save in the 2025 NWSL Challenge Cup, helping Washington avenge their championship loss to the Orlando Pride in a shootout, 4–2. She was named MVP of the season-opening match. In August, she surpassed Tori Huster to become the Spirit's all-time leader in minutes played. In the quarterfinals of the 2025 NWSL playoffs, Kingsbury saved two penalties in a shootout victory over Racing Louisville, sending Washington to the semifinals.

In February 2026, Kingsbury announced that she was pregnant with her first child. She was placed on maternity leave before the start of the 2026 season, with Sandy MacIver taking over as Washington's starting goalkeeper.

==== Sydney FC (loan) ====
In September 2018, Kingsbury re-signed for the 2018–19 W-League season where she helped Sydney reach its second straight Grand Final. Kingsbury and Sydney FC won the 2019 Grand Final. She was subsequently named the 2018–19 W-League Goalkeeper of the Year.

== International career ==
Kingsbury received her first senior call-up to the United States national team on October 31, 2019. In November 2020, Kingsbury was named to the national team's training camp roster ahead of its November 27 game against the Netherlands. Andonovski also named Kingsbury to the senior team roster ahead of their matches on January 18, 2021, and January 22, 2021.

On January 12, 2022, Kingsbury was named in the national team camp for January ahead of the 2022 SheBelieves Cup in February.

== Personal life ==
Kingsbury is a Christian. Her twin sister, Amber Bledsoe, is also a goalkeeper who attended Brown University. In December 2021, she married Matt Kingsbury and began playing under her married name in January 2022.

== Career statistics ==
=== International ===
As of match played December 5, 2023

National Team	Year	Apps	Goals
United States	2022	1	0
United States	2023	1	0
Total		2	0

== Honors ==
Sydney FC

- W-League Championship: 2018–19

Washington Spirit

- NWSL Championship: 2021
- NWSL Challenge Cup: 2025

United States

- CONCACAF Women's Championship: 2022
- SheBelieves Cup: 2022

Individual

- NWSL Goalkeeper of the Year: 2019, 2021
- NWSL First XI: 2019
- NWSL Player of the Week: 2019 (Week 4 and Week 7)
- NWSL Team of the Month: 2019 (May, June, and August)
- NWSL Championship MVP: 2021
- NWSL Challenge Cup MVP: 2025
