= Kris Ward =

American soccer coach (born 1979)

Personal information
- Date of birth: November 20, 1979 (age 46)

College career
Years	Team	Apps	(Gls)
1998–1999	Union University Bulldogs		

Managerial career
- 2004–2007: St. Mary's Seahawks men (assistant)
- 2004–2010: Washington Freedom (assistant)
- 2013: Washington Spirit (assistant)
- 2020–2021: Washington Spirit (assistant)
- 2021: Washington Spirit (interim)
- 2022: Washington Spirit

Kris Ward (born November 20, 1979) is an American soccer coach. He was most recently the head coach of the Washington Spirit in the National Women's Soccer League (NWSL).

== Coaching career ==
Ward re-joined Washington Spirit as an assistant coach in August 2020. After the Spirit's former head coach Richie Burke was suspended in August 2021, Ward served as acting head coach for the rest of the 2021 NWSL season and led the team to an NWSL Championship. In December 2021, Ward was named the permanent head coach.

On August 22, 2022, with the team holding a 1–6–9 record and on 12 points, second-fewest in the NWSL, the Spirit announced that Ward had been relieved of his duties with six games remaining in the season. On January 24, 2023, it was revealed Ward was banned from coaching in the NWSL due to abusive conduct while with the Spirit.

== Coaching honors ==
Washington Spirit

- NWSL Championship: 2021
