= Devon Kerr =

Canadian professional soccer player

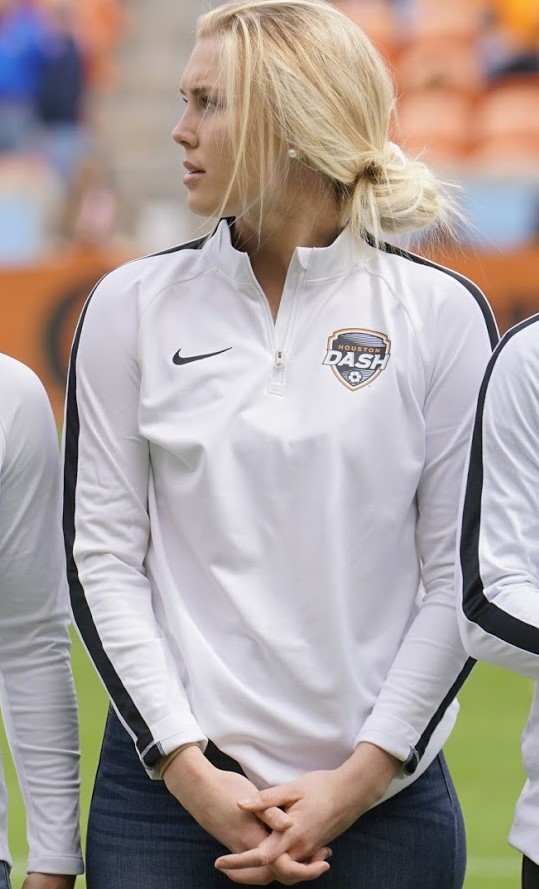

Personal information
- Full name: Devon Angela Kerr
- Date of birth: July 3, 1997 (age 29)
- Place of birth: North York, Ontario, Canada
- Height: 1.80 m (5 ft 11 in)
- Position: Goalkeeper

Youth career
- 2011–2014: Barrie SC
- Glen Shields FC

College career
Years	Team	Apps	(Gls)
2015–2018	Ohio State Buckeyes	63	(0)

Senior career*
Years	Team	Apps	(Gls)
2019	Houston Dash	0	(0)
2020	FC Metz	0	(0)
2020–2022	Washington Spirit	3	(0)
2023	Houston Dash	0	(0)

International career^{‡}
2014	Canada U-17	2	(0)
- * Club domestic league appearances and goals as of March 9, 2020 ‡ National team caps and goals as of April 22, 2019

Devon Angela Kerr (born July 3, 1997) is a Canadian former professional soccer player who played as a goalkeeper.

== Early years ==
Kerr was born in North York, Ontario, and grew up in Barrie, Ontario, to Canadian parents. She began playing soccer at age five with Barrie SC, later moving to Glen Shields FC. She originally began as an outfield player, before switching to goalkeeper at age 12. She also spent time playing in the United States at age 15 with the Florida Magic Jacks, where she was scouted by universities.

== College career ==
Kerr played four years for the Ohio State Buckeyes from 2015 to 2018. She made her collegiate debut on August 30, 2015 against the Texas Longhorns. She was named to the Big Ten All-Freshman team in 2015. In 2017, she earned back to back Big Ten Defensive Player of the Week honours on September 26 and October 3. In 2017, she was named to the Big Ten Second Team. On September 25, 2018, she was named Big Ten Goalkeeper of the Week. In her senior season, Kerr was named the 2018 Big Ten Goalkeeper of the Year, a first team All-Big Ten selection, TopDrawerSoccer.com third team All-American honours, United Soccer Coaches second team All-North Region and was a first team Scholar All-North-Central Region. She was named to the All-Tournament Team in 2017 and 2018 and was a three-time Academic All-Big Ten from 2016 to 2018 and OSU Scholar-Athlete from 2015 to 2017. In April 2019, she was a finalist for the Big Ten Medal of Honor. During her time at Ohio State, she made 63 appearances and finished with 19 career shutouts, the third most of any Buckeye.

== Club career ==
Kerr joined the Houston Dash as a non-roster invitee for their 2019 preseason. She was signed by the Dash in April 2019. On January 7, 2020 Kerr was waived by the Dash.

In January 2020, she signed with French club FC Metz in the Division 1 Féminine. After dealing with visa issues and with the club low on resources and facing relegation, she departed the club soon after.

In March 2020, Kerr signed a two-year contract with a club option for a third season with the Washington Spirit on March 9, 2020. The Spirit picked up her option for the 2022 season. She made her debut for the Spirit on April 3, 2022 in a 2022 NWSL Challenge Cup match against the Orlando Pride.

In January 2023, she signed a one-year contract with the Houston Dash.

In December 2023, she announced her retirement from the sport.

== International career ==
As a dual citizen, Kerr is eligible to represent either Canada or the United States.

Kerr played for the Canadian U-17 national team, participating in both the 2013 CONCACAF Women's U-17 Championship and 2014 FIFA U-17 Women's World Cup.

Kerr was also called up for several United States U-19, United States U-20 and United States U-23 camps.

In 2022, she was called up to the Canada women's national soccer team for the first time for the 2022 Arnold Clark Cup.

== Career statistics ==
=== College ===
As of April 22, 2019

Club	League	Season	League		Playoffs		Total	
Club	League	Season	Apps	Goals	Apps	Goals	Apps	Goals
Ohio State University	NCAA	2015	13	0	1	0	14	0
Ohio State University	NCAA	2016	9	0	0	0	9	0
Ohio State University	NCAA	2017	19	0	2	0	21	0
Ohio State University	NCAA	2018	18	0	1	0	19	0
College total			61	0	4	0	63	0
