= 2026 Kansas City Current season =

Kansas City Current's sixth season

Kansas City Current
2026 season
- Owners: Angie Long; Chris Long; Brittany Mahomes; Patrick Mahomes
- Sporting Director: Vlatko Andonovski (until Sep 7)
- Head coach: Chris Armas
- Stadium: CPKC Stadium (capacity: 11,500)
- 2026: 4th
- Top goalscorer: Temwa Chaŵinga, Haley Hopkins (12)
- Highest home attendance: 12,000 or 18,000 (Oct 25 vs. WAS)
- Lowest home attendance: 11,500 (14 matches)
- Biggest win: 5–1 (2 matches, NWSL)
- Biggest defeat: 0–4 (vs WAS (A), NWSL, Apr 24)
Home colors	Away colors	Third colors
- All statistics correct as of November 1, 2026.

The 2026 Kansas City Current season was the team's sixth season as a professional soccer team. The Current play in the National Women's Soccer League (NWSL), the top tier of women's soccer in the United States.

The Current defeated the Washington Spirit 2–1 at Audi Field to win the 2026 NWSL Championship in November 2026.

== Background ==
The Current finished the 2025 season in first place in the regular season, but were eliminated in the first round by eighth seed and eventual champions Gotham FC.

== Stadium and facilities ==
In 2024, the Current began playing in their new home stadium, CPKC Stadium, the first stadium in the world stadium built solely for a women's professional sports team. The stadium has a seating capacity of 11,500 with additional standing-room capacity on its north-end. The stadium is located in the Berkley Riverfront of Kansas City along the banks of the Missouri River, the namesake of the team.

CPKC Stadium held its first match between the Kansas City Current and the Portland Thorns on March 16, 2024. Kansas City won the match 5–4 in front of a sell-out crowd.

The Current continue to train in their dedicated practice facility in Riverside, Missouri, which opened in June 2022. It was the first purpose-built practice facility for an NWSL team.

== Team ==
=== Technical staff ===
As of September 7, 2026

General manager	Ryan Dell
Sporting director	Vlatko Andonovski (until Sep 7)
Head coach	Chris Armas
Assistant coach	Freya Coombe
Assistant coach	Lucas Rodríguez
Assistant coach	Milan Ivanovic
Goalkeeping coach	Ljupčo Kmetovski

=== Squad ===
As of August 9, 2026.

No.	Pos.	Nation	Player
0	GK	USA	Clare Gagne (SEI)
1	GK	USA	Marisa Jordan
2	DF	USA	Laney Rouse
3	FW	USA	Amelia White
4	DF	USA	Meila Brewer
5	DF	USA	Ellie Bravo-Young
6	FW	MAW	Temwa Chawinga
7	DF	USA	Elizabeth Ball
8	MF	USA	Croix Bethune
10	MF	USA	Lo'eau LaBonta
11	MF	CRC	Rocky Rodríguez
12	FW	USA	Gianna Paul
13	FW	USA	Haley Hopkins
15	DF	USA	Alana Cook (SEI)
16	MF	USA	Vanessa DiBernardo
17	FW	USA	Michelle Cooper
18	DF	USA	Izzy Rodriguez
19	FW	USA	Mary Long (D-45)
22	MF	USA	Bayley Feist
23	GK	BRA	Lorena
24	DF	USA	Gabrielle Robinson
27	DF	USA	Kayla Sharples
31	DF	USA	Katie Scott
44	DF	USA	Kolo Suliafu
48	GK	USA	Kaylin Williams-Mosier
53	DF	USA	Itala Gemelli
55	FW	USA	Penelope Hocking
99	MF	BRA	Debinha

== Competitions ==
=== Regular season ===
==== Regular season standings ====
Pos	Team	Pld	W	D	L	GF	GA	GD	Pts	Qualification
2	San Diego Wave FC	30	18	4	8	45	31	+14	58	Playoffs and CONCACAF W Champions Cup
3	Washington Spirit	30	17	4	9	43	28	+15	55	Playoffs
4	Kansas City Current (C)	30	16	5	9	54	39	+15	53	Playoffs and CONCACAF W Champions Cup
5	Angel City FC	30	15	7	8	54	32	+22	52	Playoffs
6	Portland Thorns FC	30	14	8	8	50	41	+9	50	Playoffs

Source: NWSL
Rules for classification: 1) points; 2) total goal difference; 3) total wins; 4) total goals scored; 5) head-to-head points; 6) head-to-head goal goals scored; 7) fewest disciplinary points; 8) coin toss (if 2 clubs tied) or drawing of lots (if ≥3 clubs tied).
(C) Champions

==== Results summary ====
Overall								Home						Away					
Pld	W	D	L	GF	GA	GD	Pts	W	D	L	GF	GA	GD	W	D	L	GF	GA	GD
30	16	5	9	54	39	+15	53	11	4	0	39	15	+24	5	1	9	15	24	−9

Last updated: November 1, 2026.
Source: NWSLsoccer.com

==== Results by matchday ====
Matchday	1	2	3	4	5	6	7	8	9	10	11	12	13	14	15	16	17	18	19	20	21	22	23	24	25	26	27	28	29	30
Ground	H	A	A	A	H	A	A	H	H	A	H	H	A	A	H	A	H	H	A	A	H	H	A	H	A	H	H	A	H	A
Result	W	L	L	L	W	L	W	W	W	L	W	W	W	L	D	L	W	D	D	L	D	W	W	D	L	W	W	W	W	W
Position	2	6	11	13	11	13	11	6	6	6	6	5	5	6	6	6	6	5	7	7	7	7	7	7	8	5	5	4	4	4

Updated to match(es) played on November 1, 2026. Source: NWSLsoccer.com
A = Away; H = Home; W = Win; D = Draw; L = Loss; P = Postponed

==== Matches ====
March 14, 2026 1	Kansas City Current	2–1	Utah Royals	Kansas City, Missouri
3:00 p.m. CDT	Scott (yellow card) 51'; Bethune 57'; Sentnor 69'	Report	Milazzo 35'	Stadium: CPKC Stadium; Attendance: 11,500; Referee: Natalie Simon

March 22, 2026 2	Chicago Stars	2–1	Kansas City Current	Evanston, Illinois
1:00 p.m. CDT	Dellarose 42'; Huitema 50'	Report	Bravo-Young (yellow card) 26'; Hopkins 57'	Stadium: Martin Stadium; Attendance: 4,192; Referee: Alex Billeter

March 25, 2026 3	Seattle Reign FC	3–0	Kansas City Current	Spokane, Washington
8:00 p.m. CDT	James-Turner 18'; Ratcliffe 26'; Mercado 33'; Brown (yellow card) 90+6'	Report	Hocking (yellow card) 12'	Stadium: ONE Spokane Stadium; Attendance: 3,023; Referee: Tom Snyder

March 28, 2026 4	Portland Thorns FC	2–0	Kansas City Current	Portland, Oregon
3:00 p.m. CDT	Vignola (yellow card) 21'; Moultrie 53' (pen.); Turner 63'	Report	Bravo-Young (yellow card) 32'; Bethune (yellow card) 34'; Sharples (yellow card) 78'	Stadium: Providence Park; Attendance: 16,734; Referee: Abdou Ndiaye

April 4, 2026 5	Kansas City Current	2–1	Gotham FC	Kansas City, Missouri
4:00 PM ET	Debinha 37'; Cooper 60'	Report	Shaw 29'	Stadium: CPKC Stadium; Attendance: 11,500; Referee: Katja Koroleva

April 24, 2026 6	Washington Spirit	4–0	Kansas City Current	Washington, D.C.
8:00 p.m. EDT (UTC-4)	Santos 25', 56'; Rodman 45+3'; Martínez 75'	Report	Sharples (yellow card) 13'; Cooper (yellow card) 43'	Stadium: Audi Field; Attendance: 19,215; Referee: Nabil Bensalah

May 2, 2026 7	North Carolina Courage	1–2	Kansas City Current	Cary, North Carolina
5:30 p.m. CDT	Weatherholt (yellow card) 40'; Matsukubo 85'; Rauch (red card) 90+7'	Report	Bethune 8'; Cooper 23'	Stadium: First Horizon Stadium; Attendance: 10,031; Referee: Atahan Yaya

May 10, 2026 8	Kansas City Current	3–0	Chicago Stars FC	Kansas City, Missouri
11:30 a.m. CDT	Chawinga 22', 47', 49'	Report	Gomes (yellow card) 34'	Stadium: CPKC Stadium; Attendance: 11,500; Referee: Laura Rodriguez

May 15, 2026 9	Kansas City Current	3–0	Houston Dash	Kansas City, Missouri
7:00 p.m. CDT	Campbell 15' (o.g.); Chawinga 17', 68'	Report	Ullmark (yellow card) 21'	Stadium: CPKC Stadium; Attendance: 11,500; Referee: Shawn Tehini

May 20, 2026 10	Angel City FC	2–1	Kansas City Current	Los Angeles, California
9:00 p.m. CDT	Thompson 9'; Phair (yellow card) 65'; Fuller 71'; Martin (yellow card) 85'	Report	Sentnor 45'; LaBonta (penalty missed) 57'	Stadium: BMO Stadium; Attendance: 11,574; Referee: Jeremy Scheer

May 24, 2026 11	Kansas City Current	3–1	Portland Thorns FC	Kansas City, Missouri
12:00 p.m. CDT	LaBonta 41'; Chawinga 63'; Hopkins 90+3'	Report	Wilson 14'	Stadium: CPKC Stadium; Attendance: 11,500; Referee: Natalie Simon

May 30, 2026 12	Kansas City Current	1–0	Boston Legacy FC	Kansas City, Missouri
12:30 p.m. CDT	Chawinga 69'	Report	Karich (yellow card) 84'; Olivieri (yellow card) 90+2'	Stadium: CPKC Stadium; Attendance: 11,500; Referee: Brad Jensen

July 3, 2026 13	Denver Summit FC	0–3	Kansas City Current	Commerce City, Colorado
8:30 p.m. CDT	Gaetino (yellow card) 36'	Report	Cooper 35', 81'; LaBonta (penalty missed) 38'; Chawinga 87'	Stadium: Dick's Sporting Goods Park; Attendance: 16,833; Referee: Abdou Ndiaye

July 10, 2026 14	Orlando Pride	3–0	Kansas City Current	Orlando, Florida
7:00 p.m. CDT	Marta 49'; Anderson 57'; Banda 85'	Report		Stadium: Inter&Co Stadium; Attendance: 8,058; Referee: Nabil Bensalah

July 17, 2026 15	Kansas City Current	2–2	San Diego Wave FC	Kansas City, Missouri
7:00 p.m. CDT	Bethune 52'; Chawinga 61'; Hopkins (yellow card) 90+6'	Report	Byars 6', 90'; Dali (yellow card) 75'	Stadium: CPKC Stadium; Attendance: 11,500; Referee: Alyssa Pennington

July 25, 2026 16	Boston Legacy FC	1–0	Kansas City Current	Pawtucket, Rhode Island
4:00 p.m. CDT	Traoré 18'; Olivieri (yellow card) 45'; Stevens (red card) 90+6'	Report	LaBonta (yellow card) 83'	Stadium: Centreville Bank Stadium; Attendance: 8,939; Referee: Matthew Corrigan

July 29, 2026 17	Kansas City Current	5–1	Racing Louisville FC	Kansas City, Missouri
7:00 p.m. CDT	Hopkins 5', 48'; Debinha 15', 52'; White 20'; Scott (yellow card) 81'	Report	Milliet (yellow card) 45+5'; Fischer (yellow card) 72'; Flint 81' (pen.)	Stadium: CPKC Stadium; Attendance: 11,500; Referee: Danielle Chesky

August 1, 2026 18	Kansas City Current	1–1	Angel City FC	Kansas City, Missouri
5:30 p.m. CDT	Hopkins (yellow card) 7', (goal) 26'; Scott (yellow card) 90+4'	Report	Suarez 14'; Emslie (yellow card) 40'; Sentnor (yellow card) 60'; Phair (yellow card) 90+7'	Stadium: CPKC Stadium; Attendance: 11,500; Referee: Shawn Tehini

August 8, 2026 19	Houston Dash	1–1	Kansas City Current	Houston, Texas
7:45 p.m. CDT	Rader (yellow card) 70' (goal) 81' (pen.)	Report	Debinha 44'; Scott (yellow card) 72'; Robinson (yellow card) 79'; Hocking (yellow card) 87'	Stadium: Shell Energy Stadium; Attendance: 7,112; Referee: Marie Durr

August 14, 2026 20	Gotham FC	2–1	Kansas City Current	Harrison, New Jersey
7:00 p.m. CDT	Purce 13'; Kerr 41'	Report	White 1'; Ball (yellow card) 33'	Stadium: Sports Illustrated Stadium; Attendance: 9,622; Referee: Muhammad Hassan

August 22, 2026 21	Kansas City Current	1–1	Seattle Reign FC	Kansas City, Missouri
5:30 p.m. CDT	Debinha 51' (pen.); Bethune (yellow card) 72'	Report	Sharples 11' (o.g.); James-Turner (yellow card) 38'; Menti (yellow card) 56'; Huerta (yellow card) 59'; Dahlien (yellow card) 70'	Stadium: CPKC Stadium; Attendance: 11,500

August 29, 2026 22	Kansas City Current	3–2	North Carolina Courage	Kansas City, Missouri
5:30 p.m. CDT	Staude 12' (o.g.); Bethune 35'; Cooper 41', (yellow card) 55'; LaBonta (yellow card) 59'; I. Rodriguez (yellow card) 74'; Hopkins (yellow card) 90'	Report	Ijeh 45+3'; Rauch (yellow card) 45+5'; Jackson 77' (pen.); Staude (yellow card) 82'; Parkinson (yellow card) 90+6'	Stadium: CPKC Stadium; Attendance: 11,500; Referee: Tiffini Turpin

September 4, 2026 23	Bay FC	2–1	Kansas City Current	San Jose, California
9:00 p.m. CDT	Lema 45+3', (yellow card) 57'; Bebar (yellow card) 84'	Report	I. Rodriguez 11'; Rouse (yellow card) 37'; Bethune (yellow card) 73'; R. Rodríguez 89'	Stadium: PayPal Park; Attendance: 10,569; Referee: Brad Jensen

September 11, 2026 24	Orlando Pride	2–2	Kansas City Current	Kansas City, Missouri
7:00 p.m. CDT	Chawinga 53'; Ball 56'; I. Rodriguez (yellow card) 70'	Report	Banda 43', 50'; Lekven (yellow card) 89'	Stadium: CPKC Stadium; Attendance: 11,500; Referee: Gerald Flores

September 18, 2026 25	San Diego Wave FC	2–0	Kansas City Current	San Diego, California
7:00 p.m. CDT	Rouse 50' (o.g.); Barcenas (yellow card) 76'; McNabb (yellow card) 84'; Wesley 90+1'	Report	Rouse (yellow card) 68' (red card) 89'	Stadium: Snapdragon Stadium; Attendance: 10,761; Referee: Jeremy Scheer

September 26, 2026 26	Kansas City Current	4–1	Denver Summit FC	Kansas City, Missouri
11:30 a.m. CDT	Hopkins 39', 47', 57'; Chawinga 76'	Report	Sheehan (yellow card) 6'; Heaps 13'	Stadium: CPKC Stadium; Attendance: 11,500; Referee: John Griggs

October 3, 2026 27	Kansas City Current	5–1	Bay FC	Kansas City, Missouri
5:30 p.m. CDT	Hopkins 24'; Debinha 46', 53', 75'; Chawinga 89'	Report	Lema 4'	Stadium: CPKC Stadium; Attendance: 11,500; Referee: Edson Carvajal

October 17, 2026 28	Utah Royals	0–2	Kansas City Current	Sandy, Utah
5:30 p.m. CDT	Miura (yellow card) 43'; Tejada (yellow card) 73'; Brown (yellow card) 82'	Report	Hopkins 21', 90+1'; Sharples (yellow card) 90+8'	Stadium: America First Field; Attendance: 10,809; Referee: Danielle Chesky

October 25, 2026 29	Kansas City Current	2–1	Washington Spirit	Kansas City, Missouri
4:00 p.m. CDT	LaBonta 14'; DiBernardo 17'; Bethune (yellow card) 48'; Ball (yellow card) 88'	Report	Luvanga 12'	Stadium: CPKC Stadium; Attendance: 12,000; Referee: Alyssa Pennington

November 1, 2026 30	Racing Louisville FC	0–2	Kansas City Current	Louisville, Kentucky
12:00 p.m. CDT	Weber (yellow card) 32'; O'Kane (yellow card) 40'	Report	Sharples 15'; Hopkins 59'	Stadium: Lynn Family Stadium; Attendance: 4,528; Referee: Jaclyn Metz

=== Playoffs ===
Quarterfinals
1	Gotham FC	1
8	Seattle Reign FC	0
4	Kansas City Current	1 (a.e.t.)
5	Angel City FC	0
3	Washington Spirit	4
6	Portland Thorns FC	1
2	San Diego Wave FC	0
7	Utah Royals	1

Semifinals
1	Gotham FC	1
4	Kansas City Current	2
3	Washington Spirit	2
7	Utah Royals	1

Championship
3	Washington Spirit	1
4	Kansas City Current	2

November 7 Quarterfinals	Kansas City Current	1–0 (a.e.t.)	Angel City FC	Kansas City, Missouri
11:30 a.m. CDT	Cooper 96' (pen.); Chaŵinga (yellow card) 114'	Report	Jónsdóttir (yellow card) 13'; Ary Borges (yellow card) 58'; Niehues (yellow card) 90+12'	Stadium: CPKC Stadium; Attendance: 11,500; Referee: Alexandra Billeter

November 15, 2026 Semifinals	Gotham FC	1–2	Kansas City Current	New York, New York
3:00 pm ET	Rouse 69' (o.g.); Carter (yellow card) 72'	Report	Bethune 20'; Rodríguez (yellow card) 64'; Hopkins 89'	Stadium: Icahn Stadium; Referee: Alyssa Pennington

November 21, 2026 2026 NWSL Championship	Washington Spirit	1–2	Kansas City Current	Washington, D.C.
8:00 p.m. EST	Rodman 90+8'	Report	DiBernardo 54'; Debinha 90+7'	Stadium: Audi Field; Attendance: 19,365; Referee: Joshua Encarnacion

== Statistics ==
As of August 14, 2026

=== Appearances and goals ===
Starting appearances are listed first, followed by substitute appearances after the + symbol where applicable.

No.	Pos	Nat	Player	Total		NWSL	
No.	Pos	Nat	Player	Apps	Goals	Apps	Goals
Goalkeepers
1	GK	(United States) USA	Marisa Jordan	7	0	7	0
23	GK	(Brazil) BRA	Lorena	13	0	13	0
48	GK	(United States) USA	Kaylin Williams-Mosier	0	0	0	0
Defenders
2	DF	(United States) USA	Laney Rouse	13	0	10+3	0
4	DF	(United States) USA	Meila Brewer	0	0	0	0
5	DF	(United States) USA	Ellie Bravo-Young	9	0	7+2	0
7	DF	(United States) USA	Elizabeth Ball	14	0	12+2	0
18	DF	(United States) USA	Izzy Rodriguez	20	0	20	0
24	DF	(United States) USA	Gabrielle Robinson	16	0	14+2	0
27	DF	(United States) USA	Kayla Sharples	17	0	15+2	0
31	DF	(United States) USA	Katie Scott	11	0	6+5	0
44	DF	(United States) USA	Kolo Suliafu	1	0	0+1	0
Midfielders
8	MF	(United States) USA	Croix Bethune	20	3	19+1	3
10	MF	(United States) USA	Lo'eau LaBonta	19	1	18+1	1
11	MF	(Costa Rica) CRC	Rocky Rodríguez	12	0	4+8	0
16	MF	(United States) USA	Vanessa DiBernardo	7	0	1+6	0
22	MF	(United States) USA	Bayley Feist	16	0	10+6	0
99	MF	(Brazil) BRA	Debinha	14	4	12+2	4
Forwards
3	FW	(United States) USA	Amelia White	15	2	5+10	2
6	FW	(Malawi) MAW	Temwa Chawinga	11	9	10+1	9
12	FW	(United States) USA	Gianna Paul	9	0	2+7	0
13	FW	(United States) USA	Haley Hopkins	20	5	9+11	5
17	FW	(United States) USA	Michelle Cooper	14	4	12+2	4
19	FW	(United States) USA	Mary Long	0	0	0	0
55	FW	(United States) USA	Penelope Hocking	12	0	1+11	0
Other players (departed during season, out on loan, season-ending injury etc.)
0	GK	(United States) USA	Clare Gagne	0	0	0	0
15	DF	(United States) USA	Alana Cook	0	0	0	0
21	MF	(United States) USA	Ally Sentnor	12	2	12	2
30	FW	(Angola) ANG	Flora Marta Lacho	0	0	0	0
34	MF	(United States) USA	Kelsey Branson	1	0	1	0
66	FW	(Republic of Ireland) IRL	Kyra Carusa	4	0	0+4	0

== Transactions ==
=== Transfers in ===
Date	Player	Pos.	Previous club	Fee/notes	Ref.
December 11, 2025	(United States) Marisa Jordan	GK	(United States) North Carolina Courage	Traded	
March 11, 2026	(United States) Penelope Hocking	FW	(United States) Bay FC	Traded for $350,000 in intra-league transfer funds	

=== Transfers out ===
Date	Player	Pos.	Destination club	Fee/notes	Ref.
November 13, 2025	(Kenya) Jereko	FW	(Denmark) HB Køge	Transfer	
December 2, 2025	(United States) Hailie Mace	DF	(United States) Orlando Pride	Decided not to resign, joined Orlando Pride	
December 17, 2025	(United States) Laurel Ivory	GK	(United States) Boston Legacy FC	Out of contract, joined Boston Legacy FC	
January 7, 2026	(Brazil) Bia Zaneratto	FW	(Brazil) SE Palmeiras	Transfer	
January 7, 2026	(United States) Alex Pfeiffer	FW	(United States) Bay FC	Out of contract, joined Bay FC	
January 8, 2026	(United States) Regan Steigleder	DF	(United States) Lexington SC	Out of contract, joined Lexington SC as a free agent	
January 13, 2026	(Canada) Nichelle Prince	FW	(United States) Boston Legacy FC	Traded	
February 11, 2026	(United States) Claire Hutton	MF	(United States) Bay FC	Traded	
June 2, 2026	(Republic of Ireland) Kyra Carusa	FW	(Denmark) HB Køge	Recalled from loan	
June 19, 2026	(United States) Ally Sentnor	FW/MF	(United States) Angel City FC	Traded in exchange for $850,000 in intraleague transfer funds.	
