= Amelia White (soccer) =

American soccer player (born 2003)

- White with the Kansas City Current in 2026

Personal information
- Full name: Amelia Grace White
- Date of birth: June 17, 2003 (age 23)
- Height: 5 ft 3 in (1.60 m)
- Position: Forward

Team information
- Current team: Kansas City Current
- Number: 3

Youth career
- Fort Wayne United
- 2018–2021: Homestead Spartans

College career
Years	Team	Apps	(Gls)
2022–2025	Penn State Nittany Lions	88	(11)

Senior career*
Years	Team	Apps	(Gls)
2024	Indy Eleven	5	(4)
2026–	Kansas City Current	23	(2)

International career
2017–2018	United States U-15		
2018	United States U-16		
2019	United States U-17		
- * Club domestic league appearances and goals as of 16:51, November 14, 2026 (UTC)

Amelia Grace White (born 2003) is an American professional soccer player who plays as a forward for the Kansas City Current of the National Women's Soccer League (NWSL). She played college soccer for the Penn State Nittany Lions. She was named the Just Women's Sports national high school player of the year in 2022.

== Early life ==
White grew up in Fort Wayne, Indiana, the daughter of Laura and Avery, and has two siblings. She and her twin sister began playing soccer when they were six years old. She soon joined local club Fort Wayne United, training with the boys' team at 13 and playing up with the oldest girls' team at 14. She played soccer and ran track at Homestead High School, helping the soccer team to the IHSAA Class 3A state title game as a freshman in 2018. She committed to play college soccer for Penn State in her freshman year. She missed much of the next two high school seasons due to youth international duty. In her senior year in 2021, she scored 25 goals with 15 assists while leading Homestead to a 22–0 record and their first state championship. She was named Miss Indiana Soccer, the Indiana Gatorade Player of the Year, and the Just Women's Sports High School Soccer Player of the Year. TopDrawerSoccer ranked White the 2nd-best prospect in the 2022 class, part of Penn State's top-ranked recruiting class.

== College career ==
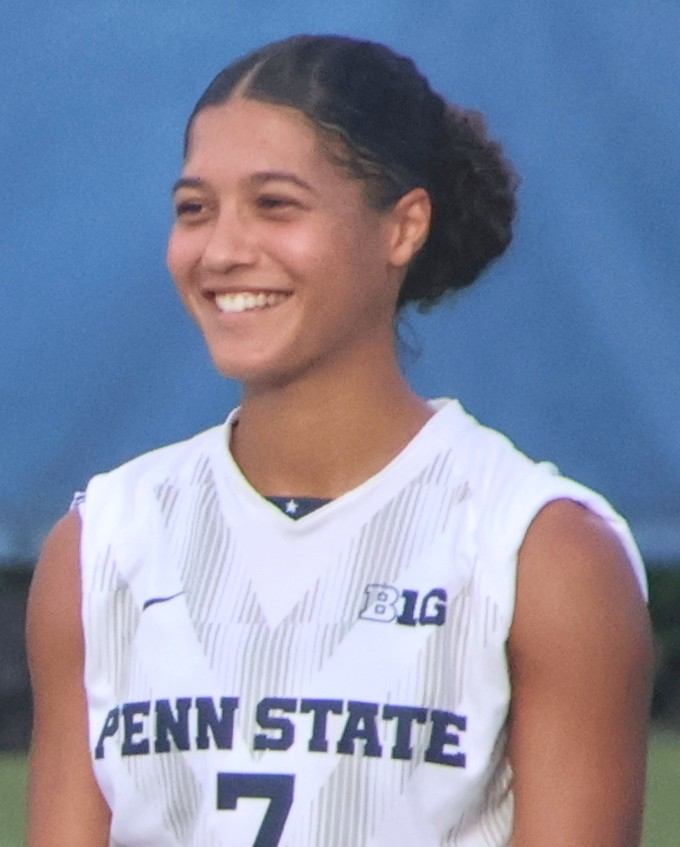
White with Penn State in 2025

White played in all 23 games, starting 9, and scored 2 goals with 4 assists for the Penn State Nittany Lions as a freshman in 2022, earning Big Ten Conference all-freshman honors. She helped the team win the Big Ten tournament and scored twice as they reached the NCAA tournament third round. She played in all 23 games, starting 3, and scored 2 goals with 1 assists as a sophomore in 2023, reaching the NCAA tournament quarterfinals. She took on a larger role in her junior year in 2024, making 20 starts and scoring 1 goal with 5 assists in 21 games, as she again made the NCAA tournament quarterfinals. She started all 21 games in her senior year in 2025, scoring 6 goals and adding 4 assists in her most productive college campaign. She earned second-team All-Big Ten honors and scored once in the NCAA tournament before losing in the second round.

== Club career ==
The Kansas City Current announced on January 6, 2026, that they had signed White to her first professional contract on a two-year deal. She made her professional debut against the Portland Thorns on March 28, replacing Gabrielle Robinson as a second-half substitute in a 2–0 loss. On July 29, in just her second start, she scored her first professional goal in a 5–1 victory over Racing Louisville. On August 14, she scored 22 seconds into the game against Gotham FC, equaling teammate Michelle Cooper's record for fastest goal in the NWSL; the Current lost the match 2–1.

== International career ==
White began training with the United States under-15 team in 2017. In 2018, she helped the under-16 team win the UEFA Under-16 Development Tournament. She was one of the under-17 team's leading scorers with five goals in 2019. Due to the COVID-19 pandemic, the 2020 CONCACAF Women's U-17 Championship and the 2021 FIFA U-17 Women's World Cup were cancelled.

== Honors and awards ==
Penn State Nittany Lions

- Big Ten Conference tournament: 2022

Kansas City Current

- NWSL Championship: 2026

Individual

- Second-team All-Big Ten: 2025
- Big Ten all-freshman team: 2022
