= Elizabeth Ball (soccer) =

American soccer player (born 1995)

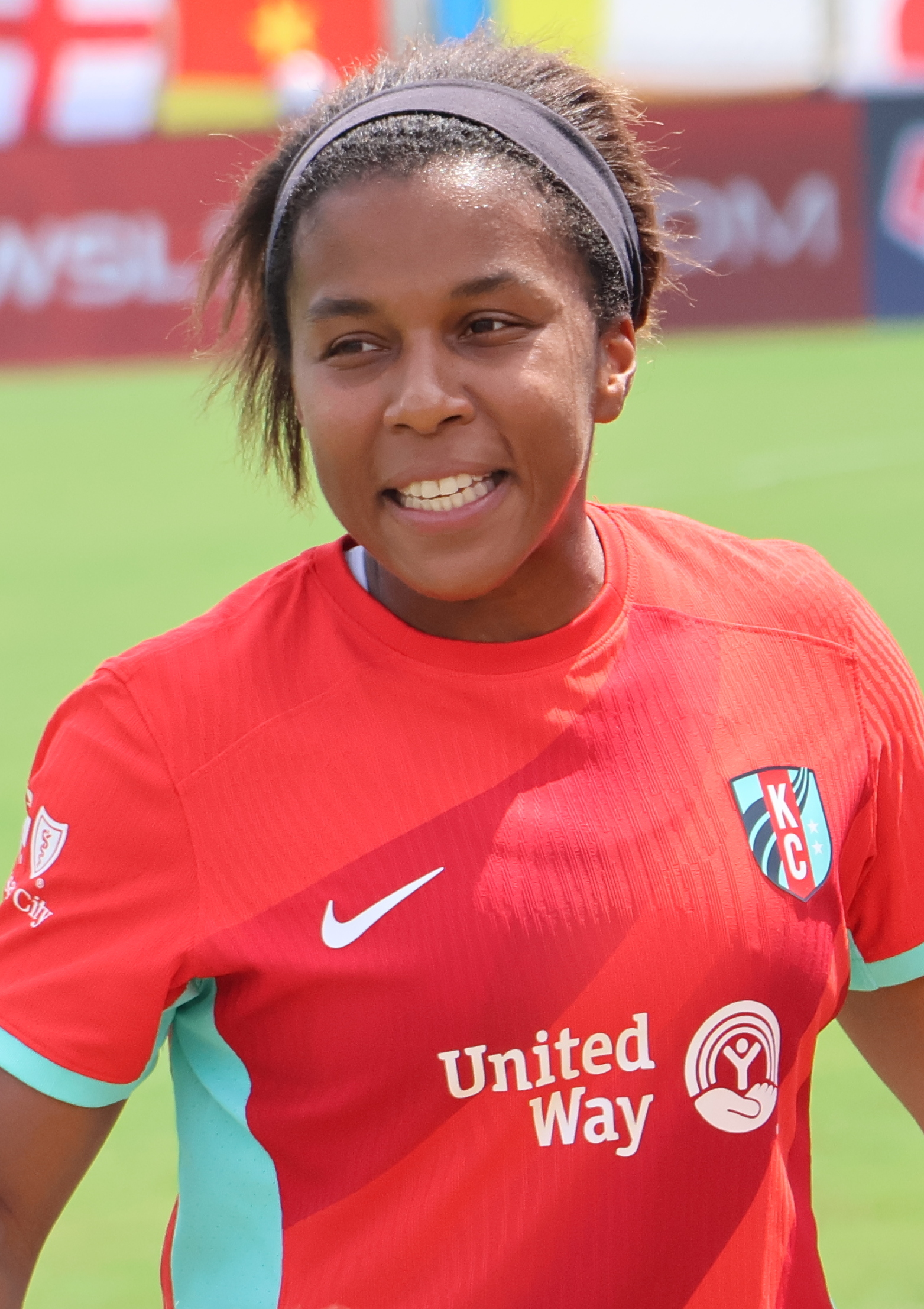
- Ball with the Kansas City Current in 2024

Personal information
- Full name: Elizabeth Rose Ball
- Date of birth: October 20, 1995 (age 31)
- Place of birth: Newport News, Virginia, U.S.
- Height: 5 ft 6 in (1.68 m)
- Position: Defender

Team information
- Current team: Kansas City Current
- Number: 7

College career
Years	Team	Apps	(Gls)
2014–2017	Penn State Nittany Lions	95	(9)

Senior career*
Years	Team	Apps	(Gls)
2018–2019	Portland Thorns	23	(0)
2020	Utah Royals	4	(0)
2021–	Kansas City Current	109	(4)
- * Club domestic league appearances and goals as of 16:45, November 14, 2026 (UTC)

Elizabeth Rose Ball (born October 20, 1995) is an American professional soccer player who plays as a defender for the Kansas City Current of the National Women's Soccer League (NWSL). She played college soccer for Penn State and has previously played for the Portland Thorns and Utah Royals.

== Early life ==
Ball played on the Richmond Strikers ECNL (Elite Club National League) team. She was selected to attend the ECNL id2/The Chance National Training Camp in 2013. On her ECNL team from 2011 – 2014, Ball scored 57 goals.

Ball played as a forward at Deep Run High School (2010–2014) in Richmond, Virginia. During her high school career, the Wildcats soccer team appeared in the state quarterfinals (2011), semi-finals (2012, 2014) and the finals (2013), winning the title in a 2–1 match against Battlefield High School. As a freshman, Ball was named The Times-Dispatch's 2011 girls soccer Player of the Year, as well as Colonial District and Central Region Player of the Year and team MVP, having scored 20 goals and 9 assists in a 20–1 season. As a sophomore, Ball scored 21 goals and 7 assists, with the team ending the 2012 season as the state semi-finalist. She received The Times-Dispatch's All-Metro Player of the Year honor a second time in 2013 to cap off winning the state championship, having scored both goals in the title match for a total of 34 goals and 7 assists in the season. As a senior, Ball was named 2014 High School State Player of the Year for Virginia by the National Soccer Coaches Association of America.

== College career ==
Ball attended Penn State University (2014–2017), majoring in Biobehavioral Health. She started every game (24) her freshman year as a centerback, scoring one goal and helping to secure 9 shutouts. The 20–4–0 season ended in the NCAA Elite Eight in a 2–1 loss to Texas A&M. As a sophomore (2015), Ball won numerous accolades for her defense including BIG Ten Defensive Player of the Week (twice), TopDrawerSoccer.com Team of the Week and, as a team, winning the Big Ten Tournament. The biggest prize, however, came when Penn State Women's Soccer won the NCAA College Cup Championship, without allowing a single goal in the entire tournament. Ball started all 27 games on a backline that secured 15 shutouts. In addition, she scored 3 goals. The season ended 22–3–2 with the 1–0 win over Duke in the 2015 College Cup final.

In 2016, Ball started all 21 games, helped to secure 9 shutouts, and scored 2 goals and 1 assist. She was named to the BIG Ten First Team and the NSCAA All Great Lakes Region Second Team. The team lost to Virginia in the NCAA tournament to end the season 12–5–4. In her senior season, Ball was co-captain and started 21 of 23 games, scored 3 goals and helped to secure 12 shutouts. The team lost to Stanford, the 2017 College Cup winner, in the Elite Eight on a 15–5–4 record. She ended her Penn State career as the 4th all-time leader in minutes played with a total of 7,881 minutes over 95 games.

== Club career ==
=== Portland Thorns, 2018–2019 ===
Ball signed her first professional contract with the Portland Thorns in 2018. She made her first start against the North Carolina Courage in Cary on March 24, 2018. She appeared in 7 games in the 2018 season. In the 2019 season, Ball played in 16 matches, 14 of which were starts. She made her first career playoff start (and played 45 minutes) in the NWSL semi-finals against the Chicago Red Stars on Oct. 20.

=== Utah Royals, 2020 ===
As the 2020 season began, Ball was traded to Utah Royals. She appeared in five matches of the NWSL Challenge Cup, starting in four.

=== Kansas City Current, 2021– ===
Ball joined the Kansas City Current before its inaugural 2021 season. She scored her first NWSL goal against the Houston Dash on October 13, 2021. Following that season, she signed a three-year contract through 2024.

On January 27, 2025, it was announced that Ball signed a two-year contract extension with the Current. She was part of the Current's historic 2025 season, which saw the club win its first NWSL Shield and break league single-season records for most wins (21), points (65), and shutouts (16).

== Personal life ==
Ball is engaged to former Current teammate Kristen Hamilton. In 2024, Ball founded Pitchside Coffee alongside Hamilton and fellow Current teammates Vanessa DiBernardo, Hailie Mace, Desiree Scott, and Mallory Weber. Pitchside Coffee became an official restaurant partner of CPKC Stadium in 2025.

== Honors ==
Penn State Nittany Lions

- NCAA Division I Women's Soccer Championship: 2015

Kansas City Current

- NWSL Championship: 2026
- NWSL Shield: 2025
- NWSL x Liga MX Femenil Summer Cup: 2024
