= Laney Rouse =

American soccer player (born 2002)

- Rouse with the Kansas City Current in 2026

Personal information
- Full name: Elaine Marie Rouse
- Date of birth: August 31, 2002 (age 24)
- Height: 5 ft 7 in (1.70 m)
- Position: Right back

Team information
- Current team: Kansas City Current
- Number: 2

College career
Years	Team	Apps	(Gls)
2020–2025	Virginia Cavaliers	97	(2)

Senior career*
Years	Team	Apps	(Gls)
2026–	Kansas City Current	21	(0)

International career
2018	United States U-16		
2018	United States U-19	1	(0)
2022	United States U-20	10	(0)
2023	United States U-23	2	(0)
- * Club domestic league appearances and goals as of 16:50, November 14, 2026 (UTC)

Elaine Marie Rouse (born August 31, 2002) is an American professional soccer player who plays as a right back for the Kansas City Current of the National Women's Soccer League (NWSL). She played college soccer for the Virginia Cavaliers, earning All-American honors in 2025. She began her professional career with the Current in 2026, winning the NWSL Championship in her rookie season. She represented the United States at the 2022 FIFA U-20 Women's World Cup.

== Early life ==
Rouse grew up in Cary, North Carolina, the daughter of Cheryl and Granville Rouse, and has two older brothers. She began playing soccer when she was four as she took after one of her brothers, Jordan, who later played college soccer for the St. John's Red Storm. She played club soccer for the North Carolina Courage Academy. She committed to Virginia before her sophomore year at Cary Academy. She was ranked by TopDrawerSoccer as the 26th-best prospect of the 2020 class, part of Virginia's second-ranked recruiting class.

== College career ==
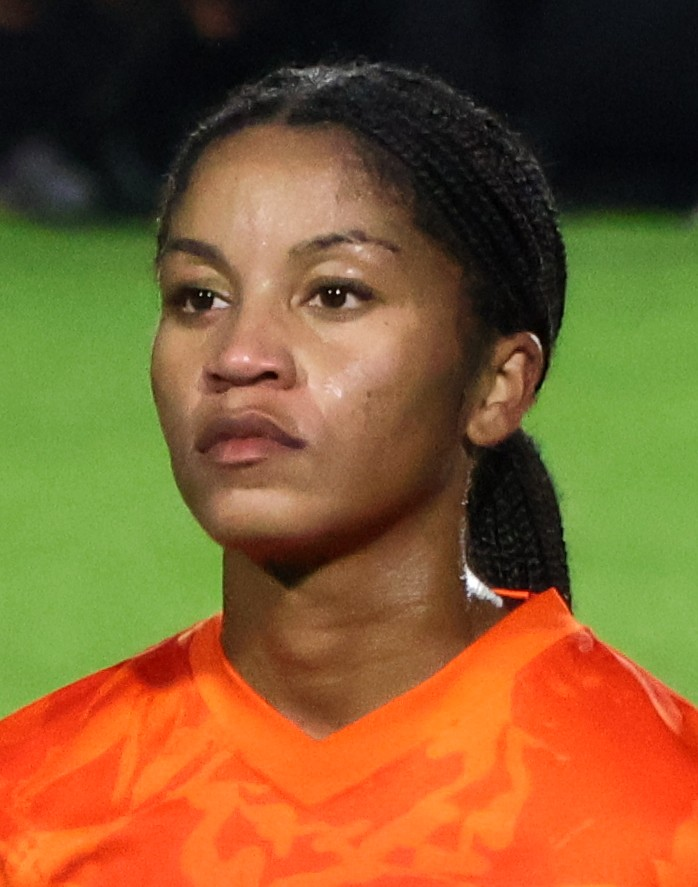
Rouse with Virginia in 2025

Rouse played in 12 games and started 3 for the Virginia Cavaliers as a freshman in 2020, helping reach both the ACC and NCAA tournament semifinals. She played in all 23 games and started 13 as a sophomore in 2021, winning the Atlantic Coast Conference (ACC) regular-season title. She started all five postseason games as the Cavaliers lost the ACC tournament final to Florida State and earned a one seed in the NCAA tournament, making the third round. She played in 20 games with 18 starts in her junior year in 2022, scoring one goal in the NCAA tournament as the Cavaliers made the quarterfinals. In 2023, she injured the Achilles tendon in her left ankle in the opening game and missed the rest of the season.

Rouse returned to start all 19 games for the Cavaliers in 2024, helping the team back into the NCAA tournament after missing it the year prior. She had a "sixth-year Renaissance" in her last college season in 2025, starting all 22 games, scoring a goal against Duke, and adding a career-high three assists. Virginia made the ACC tournament semifinals and earned a one seed in the NCAA tournament, losing in the third round on penalties. She was named second-team All-ACC and tabbed fourth-team All-American by United Soccer Coaches.

== Club career ==
The Kansas City Current announced on December 19, 2025, that they had signed Rouse to her first professional contract on a one-year deal. She made her professional debut on March 25, 2026, the third day of the season, starting in a 3–0 defeat to the Seattle Reign. Two months later, she signed a two-year extension to tie her to the Current through 2028. In the playoffs, despite scoring an own goal for Gotham FC in the semifinals, she helped hold the defending champions to zero shots on goal as the Current won 2–1. She played the full match in the 2026 NWSL Championship against the Washington Spirit, helping the Current win 2–1 for their first NWSL title.

== International career ==
Rouse began training with the United States youth national team at the under-14 level in 2016. In 2018, she helped the under-16s win the Torneo delle Nazioni friendly tournament in Italy. She helped the under-20s win the 2022 CONCACAF Women's U-20 Championship, starting in the 2–0 win over Mexico in the final. She then made the roster for the 2022 FIFA U-20 Women's World Cup in Costa Rica, playing and starting in two games and earning an assist to future Kansas City teammate Michelle Cooper in the opening 3–0 win over Ghana, but the United States failed to make it out of the group stage. She played friendlies for the under-23s in 2023.

== Honors and awards ==
Virginia Cavaliers

- Atlantic Coast Conference: 2021

Kansas City Current

- NWSL Championship: 2026

United States U-20

- CONCACAF Women's U-20 Championship: 2022
- Sud Ladies Cup: 2022

Individual

- Fourth-team All-American: 2025
- Second-team All-ACC: 2025
