= Kansas City Current =

American professional women's soccer team in Kansas City, Missouri

- Founded: December 6, 2020; 5 years ago, as Kansas City NWSL
- Stadium: CPKC Stadium; Kansas City, Missouri
- Capacity: 11,500
- Owners: Angie Long; Chris Long; Brittany Mahomes; Patrick Mahomes
- President: Raven Jemison
- Head coach: Chris Armas
- League: National Women's Soccer League
- 2026: Regular season: 4th of 14; Playoffs: Winners
- Website: kansascitycurrent.com
Home colors	Away colors	Third colors

The Kansas City Current are an American professional soccer team based in Kansas City, Missouri, that competes in the National Women's Soccer League (NWSL). It was founded as an expansion team in 2021 from league assets originally held by defunct FC Kansas City. The team plays its home games at CPKC Stadium. They reached the NWSL Championship in 2022, finishing as a runner-up. In 2025, they won the NWSL Shield with the best record in the regular season, setting several NWSL team records. The Current won their first league title in 2026 by defeating the Washington Spirit in the NWSL Championship.

== History ==
=== Establishment ===
Lo'eau LaBonta has been a member of the team since 2016 by way of being with FC Kansas City, the Utah Royals, and Kansas City Current. She leads the club with over 125 total match appearances and is the team's captain.

The Kansas City area last had an NWSL team in 2017, when two-time champions FC Kansas City ceased operations and its player-related assets were transferred to expansion team Utah Royals FC. Three years later, the Royals also had to cease operations after controversies from the team's owner Dell Loy Hansen, and a Kansas City-based ownership group led by financial executives Angie and Chris Long took advantage to secure an expansion team along with the Royals' player-related assets on December 7, 2020. Brittany Mahomes, wife of NFL quarterback Patrick Mahomes, a former college soccer player at University of Texas at Tyler and fitness trainer, purchased a stake in the team as well. In January 2023, Patrick became a member of the ownership group as well.

=== 2021–present ===
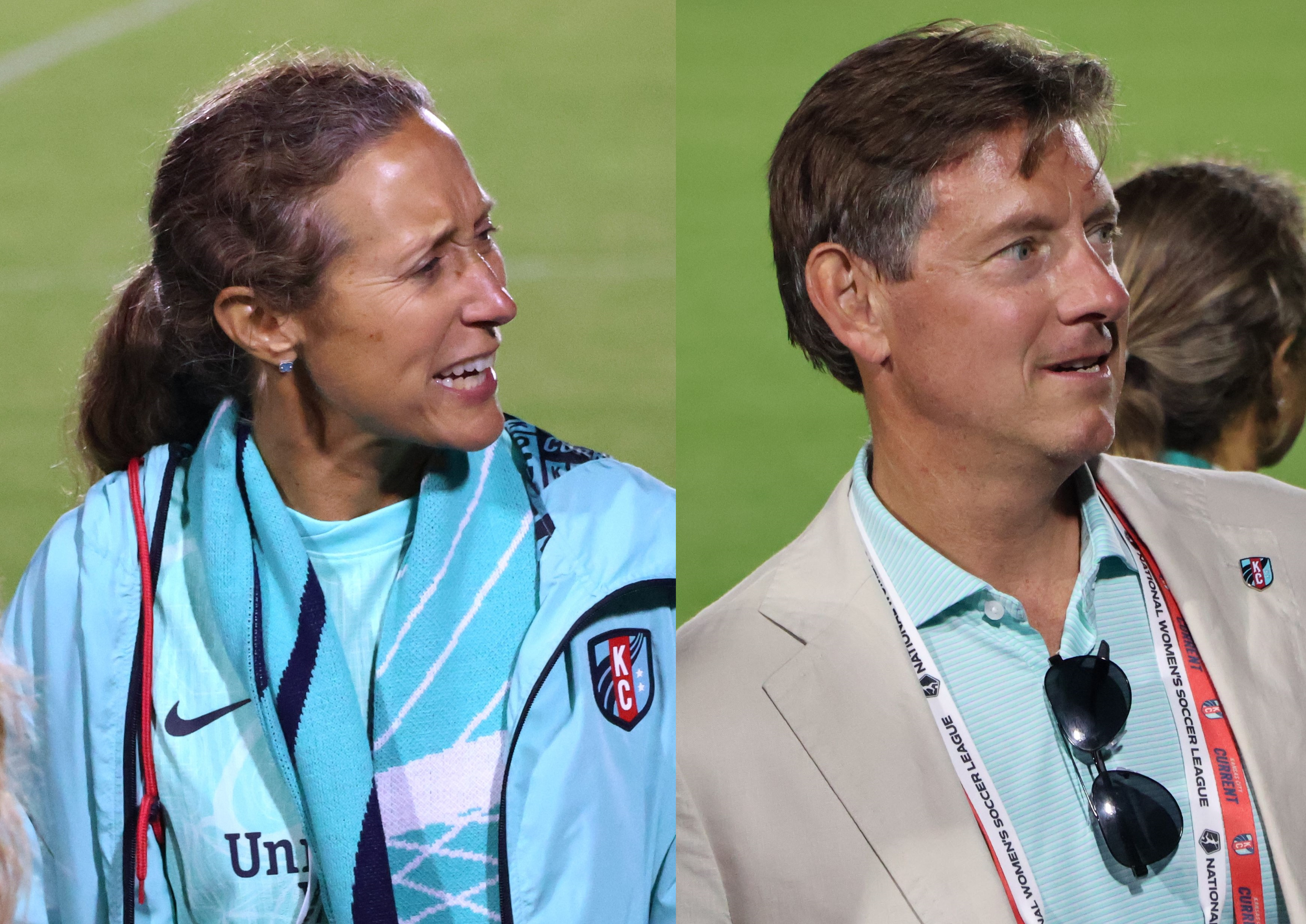
Angie and Chris Long, the owners of the franchise.

The Longs named Huw Williams, former general manager of FC Kansas City, as the team's inaugural head coach. The franchise played their first season as Kansas City NWSL, playing their home matches at Legends Field in Kansas City, Kansas, but ended their first season in Kansas City with 16 points from 24 games, 14 of which were losses.

Huw Williams was relieved of duties as manager and replaced with Matt Potter for the 2022 season, but remained with the franchise as director of soccer operations until November 2022 when it was revealed he was confronted by the team's roster for disrespectful and inappropriate behavior. This came in light of the NWSL's league-wide Yates Report. In May 2022, the team hired Allison Howard as its first team president. Kansas City unveiled their new team branding as Kansas City Current for the 2022 season, and relocated their home matches to the nearby Children's Mercy Park, in Kansas City, Kansas. A team training facility and headquarters opened in Riverside, Missouri in June 2022, and in July 2022 the ownership group announced plans for their future stadium in downtown Kansas City, Missouri. The club made significant roster moves with the additions of Sam Mewis and Lynn Williams from the North Carolina Courage, and Claire Lavogez from Bordeaux. All three players would not finish the season on the roster due to season-ending injuries, the likes of which kept both Mewis and Williams from playing a single game in the regular season. The Current had a 13-match unbeaten streak in the middle of their 2022 campaign, propelling the team to their first playoff appearance in the 2022 NWSL Playoffs, and an eventual matchup against the Portland Thorns in the NWSL Championship. Portland would go on to defeat Kansas City 2–0 in the matchup.

In 2023, the Current had a poor regular season showing, finishing 11th out of 12 teams, but had advanced to the semifinals of the 2023 NWSL Challenge Cup, where they lost to the tournament's eventual champion, North Carolina Courage. After three matches into the season, the team parted ways with Matt Potter as head coach and named Caroline Sjöblom as interim head coach for the remainder of the season. In the club's final match at Children's Mercy Park, the attendance was over 15,671, in what will now stand as a club record as they moved into CPKC Stadium. In October 2023, the team hired former U.S. women's national team and FC Kansas City manager Vlatko Andonovski to lead the team.

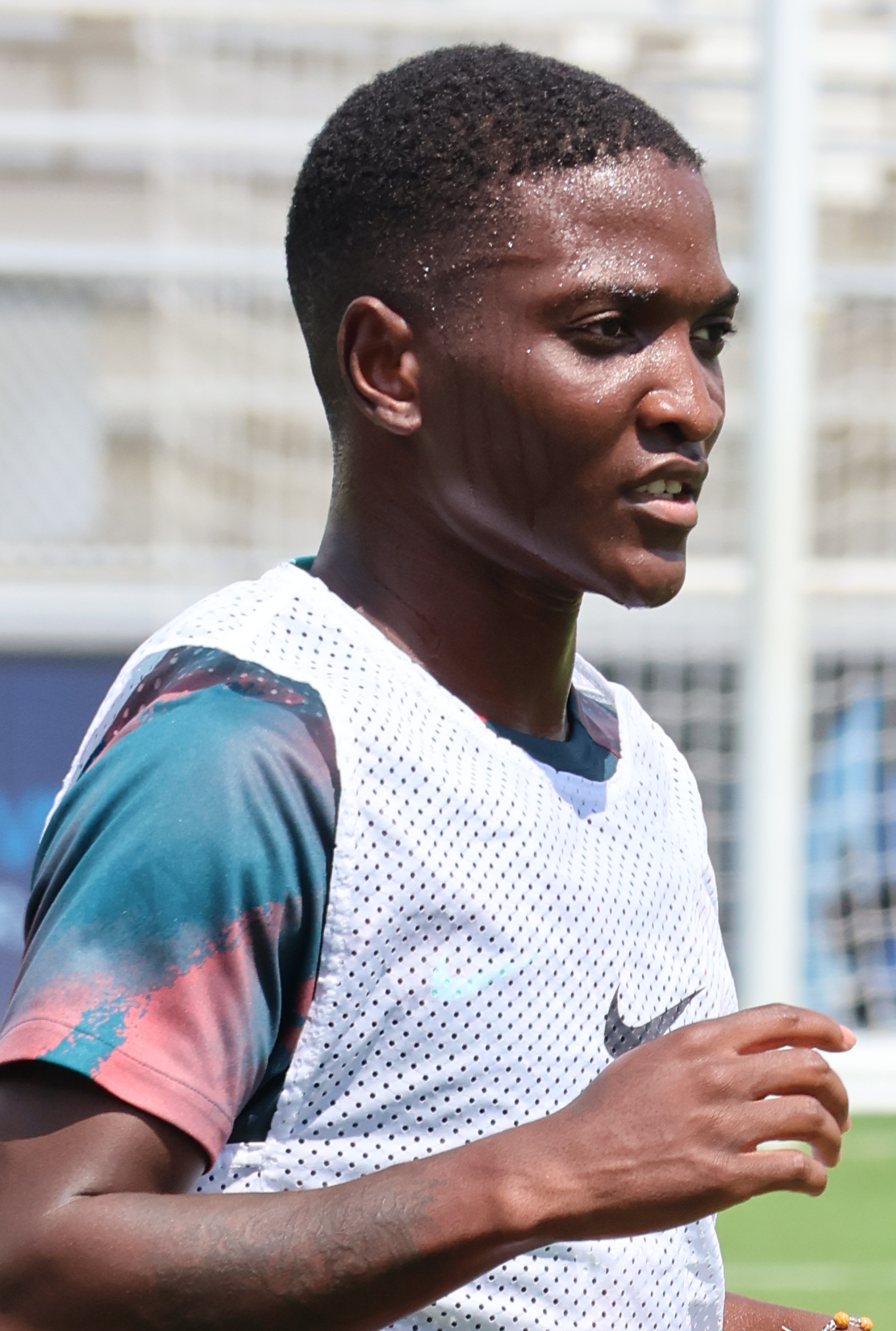
Temwa Chawinga won the Golden Boot and NWSL MVP Award in both 2024 and 2025, becoming the first NWSL to accomplish the feat in consecutive seasons.

CPKC Stadium held its first match between the Current and the Portland Thorns on March 16, 2024. Kansas City won the match 5–4 in front of a sell-out crowd. Rookie Alex Pfeiffer became NWSL's youngest goalscorer (16) in the match, and the overall goals tied a record for most in a single match in NWSL history. The team's offense was bolstered by newly-signed forward Temwa Chawinga, who became the first player in NWSL history to score 20 goals in a season, and would be awarded the NWSL Golden Boot. The Current finished the season scoring a league-record 57 goals, made by 18 different players, another NWSL record. They won two regular season trophies–the inaugural Summer Cup against NJ/NY Gotham FC and The Women's Cup against Atlético Madrid Femenino. The team lost in the semifinal round of the NWSL playoffs against the Orlando Pride. Chawinga was voted NWSL's Most Valuable Player. With their new purpose-built stadium, the Current became the first NWSL team to sell out every home match.

In October 2025, after going undefeated in 17 consecutive matches and with two games remaining in the regular season, the Current broke the NWSL record for points in a regular season campaign. It had previously stood at 60, established by the Orlando Pride in 2024. At the end of the season, the Current set new season records for most wins (21), most points (65), and most clean sheets (16). In the first round of the NWSL playoffs, the top-seeded Current lost to 8-seed (and eventual NWSL Champion) Gotham FC 2–1 after extra time. Days after the playoff loss, Vlatko Andonovski relinquished his head coaching duties in order to solely become the team's full-time sporting director. Temwa Chawinga was named NWSL MVP for the second consecutive season, making her the first NWSL player to receive that award in two consecutive seasons.

Prior to the 2026 NWSL season, the club hired Chris Armas as the club's next head coach. Halfway through the season, Andonovski departed the club for a role with Chicago Stars FC.

Kansas City finished fourth in the 2026 regular season to secure their third consecutive playoff berth. Haley Hopkins scored her 12th goal of the season in the season finale against Racing Louisville to match Temwa Chawinga as the club's top scorer of the campaign.

In the playoff quarterfinals, the Current advanced with a 1–0 extra-time victory over fifth-seeded Angel City FC at CPKC Stadium. Michelle Cooper scored the only goal from the penalty spot in first half of extra time after Kayla Sharples was pushed in the box during a corner kick.

Chris Armas was hired in 2026 and led the Current to their first league championship in his first season.

In the playoff semifinals, the Current prevailed 2–1 in a rematch of last year's playoffs against new Shield winners Gotham FC. Croix Bethune, signed from Washington before the season, opened the scoring with a bending free kick, but Gotham equalized through an own goal with 20 minutes remaining. Just before the second half ended, Hopkins secured the victory scoring off the crossbar from Izzy Rodriguez's free kick. Kansas City advanced to the second NWSL final in club history following the 2022 NWSL Championship, which they lost to the Thorns. In the 2026 NWSL Championship, Kansas City defeated the Washington Spirit 2–1 at Audi Field to win their first league championship.

== Colors and crest ==
The team's temporary crest for the inaugural season in 2021.

Due to the short turnaround between the team's founding and the 2021 NWSL season, the ownership announced in January 2021 that the team would play its inaugural season under the temporary name Kansas City NWSL with temporary crest and colors; a full brand development process would take place so that a permanent team name, crest, and colors will be in place for the 2022 NWSL season.

On October 30, 2021, the team revealed its permanent name as Kansas City Current with a new crest for the 2022 season. The crest features two stars representing Kansas and Missouri, and a river design that references both the team name and the Missouri River, which runs adjacent to CPKC Stadium.

=== Kit suppliers and sponsors ===
Period	Kit manufacturer	Shirt sponsor	Sleeve sponsor
2021	Nike	Palmer Square Capital Management	Blue KC
2022–2023	Nike	Saint Luke's Health System	Blue KC
2024–	Nike	United Way of Greater Kansas City	Blue KC

=== Kit history ===
2021 home	2021 away	2022–23 home	2022 away	2023 away	2024– home	2024– away

== Stadium ==
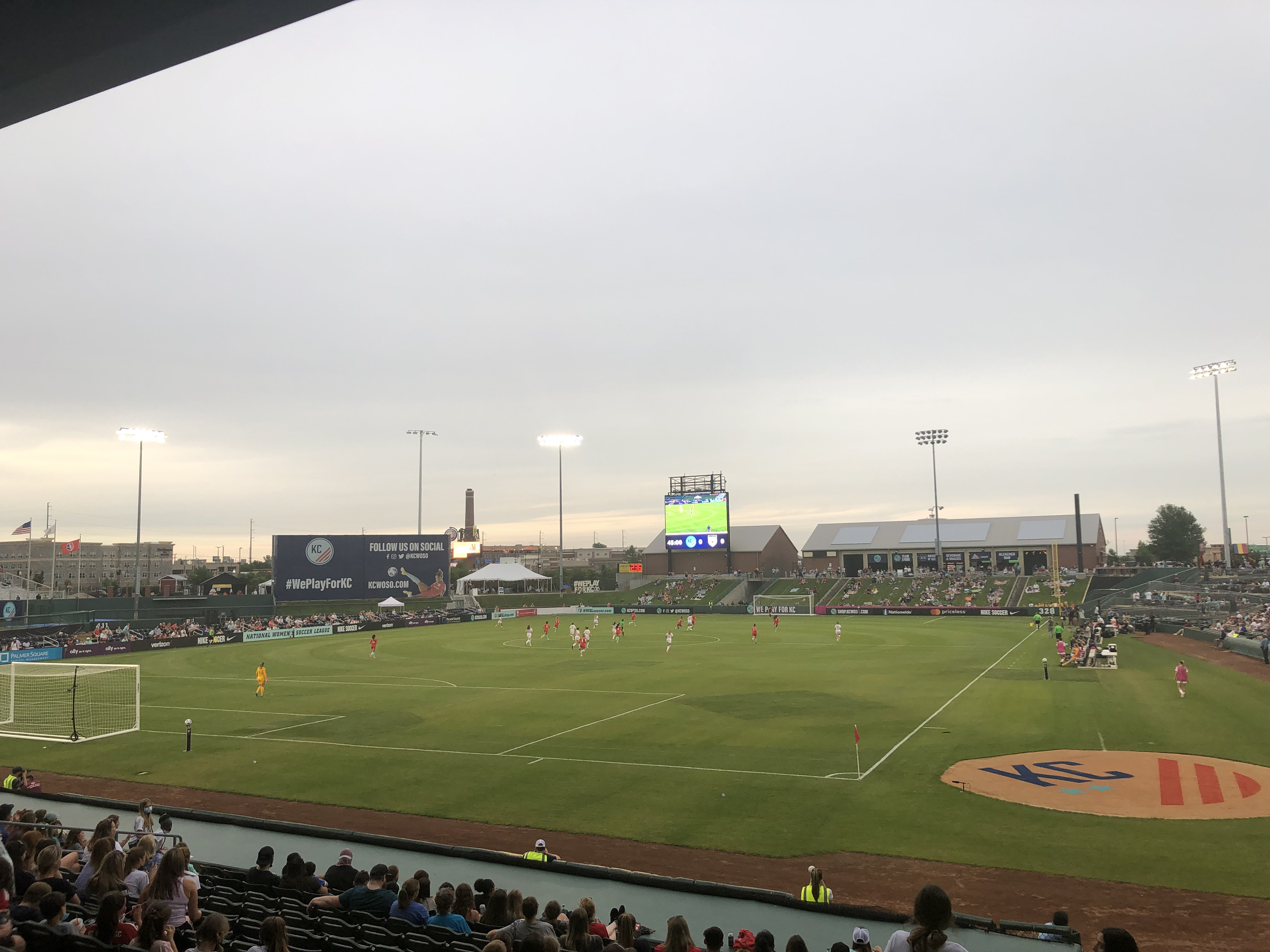
The franchise's 2021 home opener at Legends Field

From 2021 to 2023, Kansas City played home matches at Legends Field (2021) and Children's Mercy Park (2022–2023) in Kansas City, Kansas.

=== CPKC Stadium ===
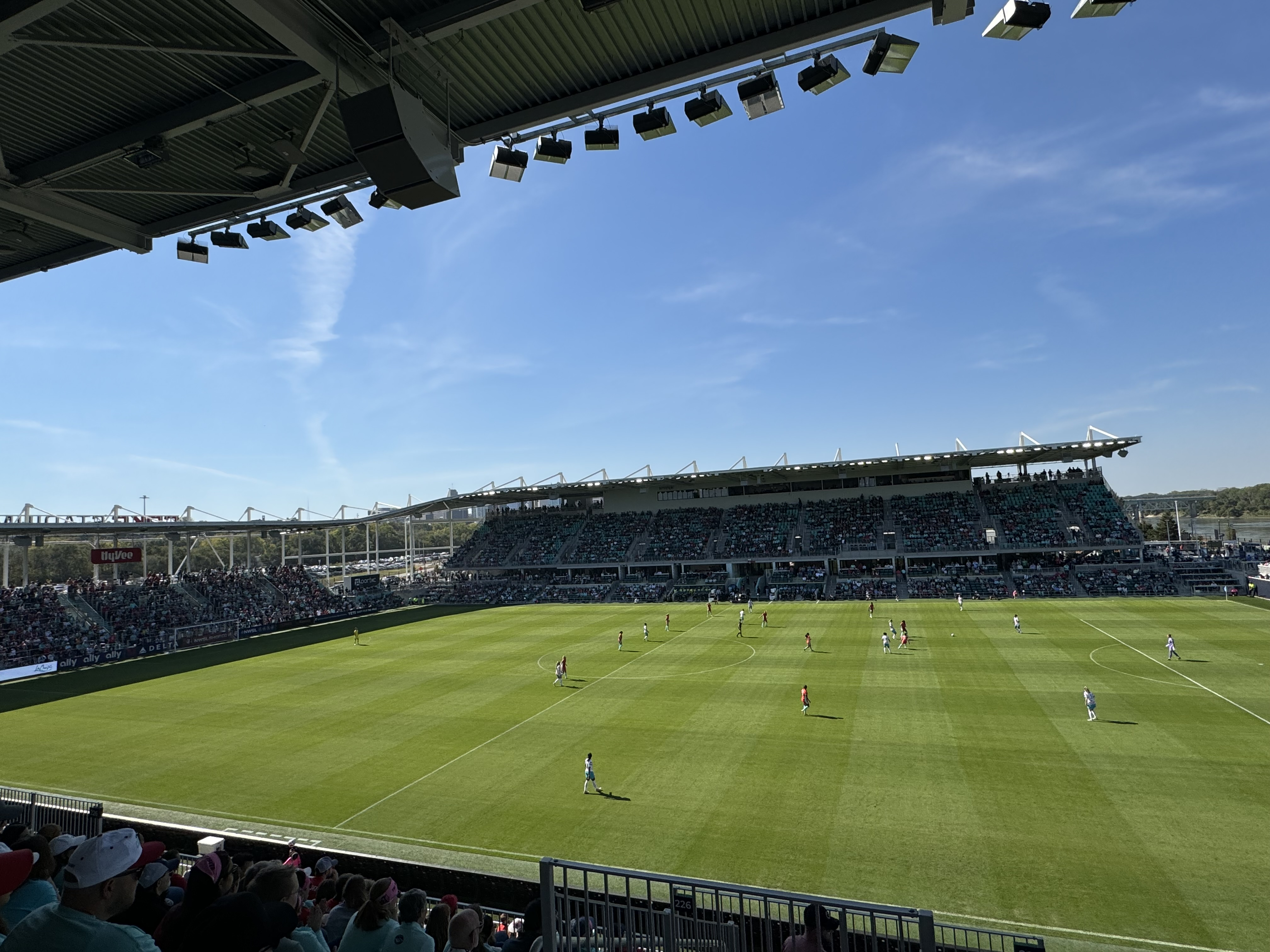
CPKC Stadium in 2024

In October 2021, the club unveiled plans to construct the first purpose-built stadium built exclusively for women's professional soccer. The stadium was built in Kansas City, Missouri, at the Richard L. Berkley Riverfront Park with a capacity of 11,500 and estimated cost of $117 million. The project was proposed to be entirely privately financed through the ownership group, with the team signing a 50-year lease for the site at which the stadium will be located. The costs increased from $70 millions to an estimated $117 million in May 2022, which the club's owners attributed to construction costs and a redesign increasing the stadium's capacity from 11,000 to 11,500. Angie and Chris Long requested $6 million in tax credits from the state of Missouri to supplement their private funding, in part because the lease agreement prohibited them from pursuing any local tax incentives. The stadium was completed in 2024. The first match was held on March 16, 2024, in which the Current defeated the Portland Thorns by a score of 5–4.

Through the first two seasons at CPKC Stadium, the Current have sold out every single match.

== Supporters ==
The Blue Crew, a supporters group of the defunct FC Kansas City, has continued to support the new NWSL team in Kansas City. Other supporter groups include Surface Tension (drumline) and The Undertow.

== Broadcasting ==
On June 13, 2021, CBS affiliate KCTV agreed on a multi-year deal to become the official local television partner through the 2023 season (in addition to any matches already scheduled by CBS Sports for national broadcast). The station and its MyNetworkTV affiliate KSMO-TV will broadcast eight matches locally in the club's inaugural season. Brad Porter will serve as the play-by-play commentator, joined by Aly Trost as the color analyst.

The Current's official radio station is 90.9 KTBG. All games air on the station over the air and via streaming.

== Kansas City Current II ==
The Current founded an affiliated reserves team in the amateur Women's Premier Soccer League (WPSL) in 2022. Under head coach Huw Williams, The team finished its first regular season atop the WPSL's Heartland Division with an 8–0–0 record, +49 goal differential on 47 total goals scored (including an opponent's forfeit), second-most in the league. In postseason play, the Current II defeated FC Milwaukee Torrent 7–0 on July 7, 2022, and then defeated Indios Denver FC 6–1 on July 16, before falling to Colorado Rapids Women 3–2 in the Central Region finals on July 17.

In November 2022, Huw Williams departed from the club. The Kansas City Current II club was left off the schedule for the 2023 season.

In June 2025, the team competed in The Soccer Tournament or TST in Cary, N.C., at WakeMed Soccer Park. The TST roster included 7 active college players along with 3 recently graduated collegiate players. Two other NWSL teams fielded TST squads with Angel City 7's and North Carolina Courage who call WakeMed Soccer Park home. Ultimately KC Current II finished third in their group with 1 win, 2 losses and a 0 goal differential (9 goals for, 9 allowed). Their lone win came, 6-3, against Wrexham Red Dragons owned by Rob McElhenney (Rob Mac) and Ryan Reynolds.

In July 2025, the Kansas City Current formally established Kansas City Current II with a full launch - the first NWSL team to fully form a second team. As a full-time, fully funded partner to the first team, the goal is to bridge youth and college players to top-tier soccer. Vasil Ristov will serve as the first coach of the full Kansas City Current II. In conjunction with the announcement, ground was broken for "Riverside Stadium", a new 2,000 seat stadium in Riverside, MO, along a Performance Center to include additional locker rooms, expansion of the Current's grass and turf practice fields and training facilities to serve the new year-round club. All three facilities, bring the Current’s total investment in player facilities in Riverside to $52 million.

KC Current II would compete in the proposed NWSL Division 2. It was reported in April 2025 the NWSL had proposed a second division league with eight teams already signed on and would require all NWSL teams to have an affiliate within the first four years of the new league. The launch date for NWSL Division 2 would be 2026 as a developmental tier under the NWSL, which has been a first-division league since its inception in late 2012. This would create a new pipeline to the NWSL after the dissolution of the NWSL Draft. The new venture still has to meet sanctioning from U.S. Soccer, but a second-division women's professional league must have at least six teams to apply for sanctioning and all stadiums must seat at least 2,000 people, and principal owners of teams must have a net worth of at least $7.5 million.

On July 19, 2026, KC Current II won the Women's Premier Soccer League's national championship in a 1–0 over New York Athletic Club. The winning goal was scored by Avery Clark in the 39th minute. She headed in a cross from a corner kick delivered by Ally Henry.

== Players and staff ==
=== Current squad ===
As of November 8, 2026.

No.	Pos.	Nation	Player
0	GK	USA	Clare Gagne
1	GK	USA	Marisa Jordan
2	DF	USA	Laney Rouse
3	FW	USA	Amelia White
5	DF	USA	Ellie Bravo-Young
6	FW	MAW	Temwa Chawinga
7	DF	USA	Elizabeth Ball
8	MF	USA	Croix Bethune
10	MF	USA	Lo'eau LaBonta
11	MF	CRC	Rocky Rodríguez
13	FW	USA	Haley Hopkins
15	DF	USA	Alana Cook
16	MF	USA	Vanessa DiBernardo
17	FW	USA	Michelle Cooper
18	DF	USA	Izzy Rodriguez
19	FW	USA	Mary Long
22	MF	USA	Bayley Feist
23	GK	BRA	Lorena
24	DF	USA	Gabrielle Robinson
27	DF	USA	Kayla Sharples
28	DF	CMR	Maëva Nyadjou
31	DF	USA	Katie Scott
44	DF	USA	Kolo Suliafu
53	DF	USA	Itala Gemelli
55	FW	USA	Penelope Hocking
84	FW	USA	Avery Clark
99	MF	BRA	Debinha

==== Out on loan ====
No.	Pos.	Nation	Player
30	FW	ANG	Flora Marta Lacho (at HB Køge)
—	FW	ZAM	Fridah Mukoma (at Beijing Jingtan FC)

=== Technical staff ===
As of November 14, 2025.

General Manager	Ryan Dell
Sporting Director
Head Coach	Chris Armas
Assistant Coach	Freya Coombe
Assistant Coach	Milan Ivanovic
Assistant Coach	Lucas Rodríguez
Goalkeeping Coach	Ljupčo Kmetovski
Director of Performance	Garga Caserta
Head of Scouting & Analytics	Kate Cohen
Head Strength Coach	Joseph Potts
Performance Analyst	Tara O'Brian

=== Notable players ===
==== FIFA World Cup participants ====
List of players that were called up for a FIFA Women's World Cup while playing for Kansas City Current. In brackets, the tournament played:

- (Brazil) Debinha (2023)
- (Brazil) Lauren (2023)
- (Denmark) Stine Ballisager Pedersen (2023)

== Honors ==
=== Domestic competitions ===
League championship(s): (1)

- NWSL Championship
  - Winners (1): 2026
  - Runners-up (1): 2022

Regular season championship(s): (1)

- NWSL Shield
  - Winners (1): 2025

League cup(s): (1)

- NWSL x Liga MX Femenil Summer Cup
  - Champions (1): 2024

== Records ==
=== Year-by-year ===
Season-by-season results
Season	League	Regular season									Playoffs	Challenge Cup	Summer Cup	W Champions Cup
Season	League	MP	W	D	L	GF	GA	GD	Pts	Pos	Playoffs	Challenge Cup	Summer Cup	W Champions Cup
2021	NWSL	24	3	7	17	15	36	−21	16	10th	DNQ	Group stage	Not held	Not held
2022	NWSL	22	10	6	6	29	29	0	36	5th	Runners-up	Semifinals	Not held	Not held
2023	NWSL	22	8	2	12	30	36	−6	26	11th	DNQ	Semifinals	Not held	Not held
2024	NWSL	26	16	7	3	57	31	+26	55	4th	Semifinals	DNQ	**Champions**	DNQ
2025	NWSL	26	21	2	3	49	13	+36	65	1st	Quarterfinals	DNQ	Not held	DNQ
2026	NWSL	30	16	5	9	54	39	+15	53	4th	**Champions**	Runners-up	Not held	DNQ

=== Head coaches ===
As of January 7, 2026.

Only competitive matches are counted. Includes NWSL regular season, playoffs, and Challenge Cup matches.

All-time Kansas City Current coaching records
Coach	Nat.	Tenure	Games	Win	Loss	Draw	Win %
Huw Williams	Wales	January 29, 2021 – November 18, 2021	28	3	17	8	10.71
Matt Potter	England	January 11, 2022 – April 19, 2023	35	16	7	12	45.71
Caroline Sjöblom	Finland	April 19, 2023 – October 23, 2023	27	13	11	3	48.15
Vlatko Andonovski	North Macedonia	October 23, 2023 – November 14, 2025	60	43	9	8	71.67
Chris Armas	United States	January 7, 2026 – present					

=== Team records ===
As of November 8, 2025. Current players in bold. Statistics are updated once a year after the conclusion of the NWSL season.

Most appearances
Player					Appearances				
#	Name	Nat.	Pos.	Current career	NWSL	Playoffs	Cup	Other	Total
1	**Lo'eau LaBonta**	(United States)	MF	2021–	103	6	14	5	128
2	Hailie Mace	(United States)	DF	2021–2025	95	6	9	4	114
3	**Izzy Rodriguez**	(United States)	DF	2022–	85	4	13	3	105
4	**Elizabeth Ball**	(United States)	DF	2021–	88	4	10	1	103
5	**Michelle Cooper**	(United States)	FW	2023–	62	2	5	5	74
6	**Debinha**	(United States)	MF	2023–	62	3	3	5	73
6	Adrianna Franch	(United States)	GK	2021–2024	57	3	9	4	73
8	Kristen Hamilton	(United States)	FW	2021–2025	53	4	11	4	72
9	Kate Del Fava	(United States)	MF	2021–2023	53	3	14	0	70
10	Desiree Scott	(Canada)	DF	2021–2024	42	4	10	2	58

Top goalscorers
Player					Appearances				
#	Name	Nat.	Pos.	Current career	NWSL	Playoffs	Cup	Other	Total
1	**Temwa Chawinga**	(Malawi)	FW	2024–	35	1	0	3	39
2	**Debinha**	(United States)	MF	2023–	20	1	3	4	28
3	**Lo'eau LaBonta**	(United States)	MF	2021–	21	1	1	2	25
4	Kristen Hamilton	(United States)	FW	2021–2025	10	1	10	2	23
5	Cece Kizer	(United States)	FW	2022–2023	13	0	2	0	15
6	**Michelle Cooper**	(United States)	FW	2023–	12	0	1	1	14
7	Bia Zaneratto	(Brazil)	FW	2024–2025	12	0	0	0	12
8	**Vanessa DiBernardo**	(United States)	MF	2023–	5	1	1	0	7
8	Hailie Mace	(United States)	DF	2021–2025	5	0	2	0	7
10	Claire Lavogez	(France)	MF	2022–2024	4	0	1	0	5
10	**Izzy Rodriguez**	(United States)	DF	2022–	5	0	0	0	5

=== Attendance ===
==== Home match largest attendance ====
Top 10 as of October 14, 2024

Date	Season	Score	Opponent	Venue	City	Attendance	Ref.
October 7, 2023	2023	6–3	Chicago Red Stars	Children's Mercy Park	Kansas City, Kansas	15,671	
August 18, 2023	2023	1–0	OL Reign	Children's Mercy Park	Kansas City, Kansas	13,455	
May 14, 2023	2023	0–2	San Diego Wave FC	Children's Mercy Park	Kansas City, Kansas	12,969	
September 1, 2023	2023	0–1	Angel City FC	Children's Mercy Park	Kansas City, Kansas	11,827	
September 28, 2024	2024	1–1	NJ/NY Gotham FC	CPKC Stadium	Kansas City, Missouri	11,500	
September 24, 2024	2024	3–0	Washington Spirit	CPKC Stadium	Kansas City, Missouri	11,500	
September 7, 2024	2024	1–0	Utah Royals	CPKC Stadium	Kansas City, Missouri	11,500	
July 6, 2024	2024	1–2	Orlando Pride	CPKC Stadium	Kansas City, Missouri	11,500	
June 28, 2024	2024	2–0	Houston Dash	CPKC Stadium	Kansas City, Missouri	11,500	
Seven additional matches	2024	—		CPKC Stadium	Kansas City, Missouri	11,500	

==== Regular season attendance ====
Season		Results		Attendance			
Year	League	Regular season	Playoffs	Average	Largest	Smallest	Ref.
2021	NWSL	10th of 10	DNQ	4,861	5,438 (Oct. 10 vs. POR)	3,449 (Oct. 13 vs. HOU)	
2022	NWSL	5th of 12	Finals	7,657	10,395 (Aug. 19 vs. ANG)	5,695 (Jun. 11 vs. GFC)	
2023	NWSL	11th of 12	DNQ	11,353	15,671 (Oct. 7 vs. CHI)	9,644 (Jun. 18 vs. WAS)	
2024	NWSL	4th of 14	Semi-finals	11,500	11,500 (All games sold out)	11,500 (All games sold out)	

== See also ==
- Sports in the Kansas City metropolitan area
