= 2026 National Women's Soccer League season =

14th season of the National Women's Soccer League

National Women's Soccer League
- Season: 2026
- Dates: March 13 – November 1 (regular season); November 6 – November 21 (playoffs)
- Champions: Kansas City Current (1st title)
- NWSL Shield: Gotham FC (1st shield)
- Challenge Cup: Gotham FC
- CONCACAF W Champions Cup: Gotham FC; San Diego Wave FC; Kansas City Current
- Matches: 240
- Goals: 674 (2.81 per match)
- Top goalscorer: Ashley Sanchez (20 goals)
- Best goalkeeper: Sandy MacIver (12 clean sheets)
- Biggest home win: 5 goals North Carolina 5–0 Orlando (Jul 31); Houston 5–0 Chicago (Aug 19); Denver 6–1 Chicago (Aug 29); Denver 6–1 Louisville (Oct 24)
- Biggest away win: 6 goals Chicago 0–6 North Carolina (Sep 6)
- Highest scoring: 7 goals Houston 4–3 Louisville (Apr 3); Washington 3–4 North Carolina (Aug 8); Boston 3–4 Portland (Aug 9); Denver 6–1 Chicago (Aug 29); Boston 2–5 Angel City (Aug 31); Denver 6–1 Louisville (Oct 24)
- Longest winning run: 5 matches San Diego (Mar 22 – Apr 25) and (Sep 12 – Oct 17); Utah (Mar 28 – May 6); Washington (Apr 5 – May 10); Kansas City (Sep 26 – Nov 1)
- Longest unbeaten run: 10 matches Utah (Mar 25 – May 30); Gotham (Jul 10 – Aug 28); Angel City (Aug 31 – Nov 1)
- Longest winless run: 10 matches Louisville (Aug 23 – Nov 1)
- Longest losing run: 6 matches Louisville (Aug 23 – Sep 25); Chicago (Sep 20 – Nov 1)
- Highest attendance: 63,004; Denver 0–0 Washington (Mar 28)
- Lowest attendance: 1,821; Chicago 0–3 Orlando (Mar 25)
- Total attendance: 2,650,427
- Average attendance: 11,043
- All statistics correct as of November 1, 2026.

The 2026 season is the 14th and current season for the National Women's Soccer League (NWSL), the top division of women's soccer in the United States. Including the NWSL's two professional predecessors, Women's Professional Soccer (2009–2011) and the Women's United Soccer Association (2001–2003), it is the 20th overall season of FIFA and USSF-sanctioned top division women's soccer in the United States.

The league has 16 teams, with 2 expansion teams, Boston Legacy FC and Denver Summit FC, joining the 14 teams that contested the 2025 season. All teams are scheduled to play 30 regular-season matches, home and away against every other team.

The defending NWSL champion is Gotham FC, and the defending NWSL Shield winner is the Kansas City Current.

== Teams, stadiums, and personnel ==
=== Expansion teams ===
Boston Legacy FC and Denver Summit FC joined the league as expansion teams.

=== Stadiums and locations ===
| Team | Stadium | Capacity |
|---|---|---|
| Angel City FC | BMO Stadium | 22,000 |
| Bay FC | PayPal Park | 18,000 |
| Boston Legacy FC | Gillette Stadium | 20,000 (Note: Stadium configuration for soccer seats 20,000 but can expand to full capacity of 64,628.) |
| Chicago Stars FC | Martin Stadium | 12,023 |
| Denver Summit FC | Centennial Stadium | 12,000 |
| Gotham FC | Sports Illustrated Stadium | 25,000 |
| Houston Dash | Shell Energy Stadium | 22,039 |
| Kansas City Current | CPKC Stadium | 11,500 |
| North Carolina Courage | First Horizon Stadium at WakeMed Soccer Park | 10,000 |
| Orlando Pride | Inter&Co Stadium | 25,500 |
| Portland Thorns FC | Providence Park | 25,218 |
| Racing Louisville FC | Lynn Family Stadium | 11,700 (Note: Seated capacity; full capacity with standing room is 15,304.) |
| San Diego Wave FC | Snapdragon Stadium | 35,000 |
| Seattle Reign FC | Lumen Field | 10,000 (Note: Lumen Field has a capacity of 68,740; standard configuration for Reign games seats 10,000 but can expand based on demand for individual games.) |
| Utah Royals | America First Field | 20,213 |
| Washington Spirit | Audi Field | 20,000 |

Locations of the National Women's Soccer League teams in 2026.

=== Personnel and sponsorship ===
Note: All teams use Nike as their kit manufacturer as part of a league-wide sponsorship agreement renewed in November 2021. All NWSL kits include Ally Financial as a sleeve sponsor.

| Team | Head coach | Captain(s) | Shirt sponsor | Sleeve sponsor | Back sponsor |
|---|---|---|---|---|---|
| Angel City FC | (Norway) Leif Gunnar Smerud (interim) | (United States) Sarah Gorden | DoorDash | NYX Professional Makeup | Sprouts Farmers Market |
| Bay FC | (England) Emma Coates | (United States) Abby Dahlkemper (United States) Tess Boade | Sutter Health | Visa | Sixth Street Partners Trader Joe's |
| Boston Legacy FC | (Portugal) Filipa Patão | (Canada) Nichelle Prince | TJ Maxx | Hyundai | Voya Financial |
| Chicago Stars FC | (Mexico) Karina Báez (interim) | (United States) Alyssa Naeher | Wintrust | Nellaspec | Sloan |
| Denver Summit FC | (England) Nick Cushing | (Canada) Janine Sonis (United States) Lindsey Heaps | None | Canvas Credit Union | CommonSpirit Health |
| Gotham FC | (Spain) Juan Carlos Amorós | (United States) Tierna Davidson (United States) Mandy Freeman | CarMax | Yoggies | Dove Grüns |
| Houston Dash | (United States) Fabrice Gautrat | (United States) Jane Campbell | MD Anderson Cancer Center | Magellan Corporation | La Croix Sparkling Water Shell Energy |
| Kansas City Current | (United States) Chris Armas | (United States) Lo'eau LaBonta | United Way of Greater Kansas City | Blue Cross and Blue Shield of Kansas City | La Croix Sparkling Water CVS Health |
| North Carolina Courage | (Lebanon) Mak Lind | (United States) Natalie Jacobs | Merz Aesthetics | Jump Platforms | Inmar Intelligence |
| Orlando Pride | (Sweden) Yolanda Thomas (interim) | (Brazil) Marta (United States) Haley McCutcheon (Brazil) Angelina | Orlando Health | Heart of Florida United Way | AluCup Publix |
| Portland Thorns FC | (Sweden) Robert Vilahamn | (United States) Sam Hiatt | ring | Treasure AI | La Croix Sparkling Water Alaska Airlines |
| Racing Louisville FC | (United States) Bev Yanez | (United States) Arin Wright | GE Appliances | Toyota | PNC Financial Services |
| San Diego Wave FC | (Sweden) Jonas Eidevall | (France) Kenza Dali | Kaiser Permanente | Dexcom | None |
| Seattle Reign FC | (England) Laura Harvey | (Wales) Jess Fishlock (United States) Sofia Huerta | Trupanion | CVS Health | Paula's Choice Skincare |
| Utah Royals | (Belgium) Jimmy Coenraets | (United States) Paige Cronin | America First Credit Union | Intermountain Health | SME Industries |
| Washington Spirit | (Spain) Adrián González | (United States) Aubrey Kingsbury | CVS Health | Iams | Events DC American Beverage Association |

=== Coaching changes ===
| Team | Outgoing coach | Manner of departure | Date of vacancy | Position in table | Incoming coach | Date of appointment | Ref. |
|---|---|---|---|---|---|---|---|
| Boston Legacy FC | Expansion team | | | Preseason | (Portugal) Filipa Patão | June 25, 2025 | |
| Denver Summit FC | Expansion team | | | Preseason | (England) Nick Cushing | August 6, 2025 | |
| Bay FC | (United States) Albertin Montoya | Resigned | September 8, 2025 | Preseason | (England) Emma Coates | December 4, 2025 | |
| Kansas City Current | (North Macedonia) Vlatko Andonovski | Promoted to global sporting director | November 14, 2025 | Preseason | (United States) Chris Armas | January 7, 2026 | |
| Chicago Stars FC | (Sweden) Anders Jacobson (interim) | End of interim period | November 23, 2025 | Preseason | (Sweden) Martin Sjögren | August 13, 2025 | |
| North Carolina Courage | (England) Nathan Thackeray (interim) | End of interim period | November 23, 2025 | Preseason | (Lebanon) Mak Lind | January 24, 2026 | |
| Portland Thorns FC | (England) Rob Gale | Fired | November 25, 2025 | Preseason | (England) Sarah Lowdon (interim) | November 25, 2025 | |
| Portland Thorns FC | (England) Sarah Lowdon (interim) | End of interim period | March 4, 2026 | Preseason | (Sweden) Robert Vilahamn | March 4, 2026 | |
| Angel City FC | (Norway) Alexander Straus | Fired | June 17, 2026 | 11th | (Norway) Leif Gunnar Smerud (interim) | June 17, 2026 | |
| Chicago Stars FC | (Sweden) Martin Sjögren | Fired | August 12, 2026 | 16th | (Mexico) Karina Báez (interim) | August 12, 2026 | |
| Orlando Pride | (England) Seb Hines | Fired | August 31, 2026 | 12th | (Sweden) Yolanda Thomas (interim) | August 31, 2026 | |

== Regular season ==
=== Standings ===
| Pos | Team | Pld | W | D | L | GF | GA | GD | Pts | Qualification |
|---|---|---|---|---|---|---|---|---|---|---|
| 1 | Gotham FC (S) | 30 | 18 | 7 | 5 | 39 | 23 | +16 | 61 | Playoffs and CONCACAF W Champions Cup |
| 2 | San Diego Wave FC | 30 | 18 | 4 | 8 | 45 | 31 | +14 | 58 | Playoffs and CONCACAF W Champions Cup |
| 3 | Washington Spirit | 30 | 17 | 4 | 9 | 43 | 28 | +15 | 55 | Playoffs |
| 4 | Kansas City Current (C) | 30 | 16 | 5 | 9 | 54 | 39 | +15 | 53 | Playoffs and CONCACAF W Champions Cup |
| 5 | Angel City FC | 30 | 15 | 7 | 8 | 54 | 32 | +22 | 52 | Playoffs |
| 6 | Portland Thorns FC | 30 | 14 | 8 | 8 | 50 | 41 | +9 | 50 | Playoffs |
| 7 | Utah Royals | 30 | 14 | 5 | 11 | 44 | 39 | +5 | 47 | Playoffs |
| 8 | Seattle Reign FC | 30 | 14 | 5 | 11 | 37 | 33 | +4 | 47 | Playoffs |
| 9 | North Carolina Courage | 30 | 14 | 3 | 13 | 52 | 42 | +10 | 45 | |
| 10 | Denver Summit FC | 30 | 11 | 8 | 11 | 53 | 42 | +11 | 41 | |
| 11 | Orlando Pride | 30 | 11 | 3 | 16 | 39 | 47 | −8 | 36 | |
| 12 | Houston Dash | 30 | 9 | 6 | 15 | 38 | 44 | −6 | 33 | |
| 13 | Boston Legacy FC | 30 | 9 | 6 | 15 | 41 | 53 | −12 | 33 | |
| 14 | Bay FC | 30 | 7 | 6 | 17 | 30 | 47 | −17 | 27 | |
| 15 | Racing Louisville FC | 30 | 7 | 3 | 20 | 38 | 62 | −24 | 24 | |
| 16 | Chicago Stars FC | 30 | 5 | 2 | 23 | 17 | 71 | −54 | 17 | |

Source: NWSL
Rules for classification: 1) points; 2) total goal difference; 3) total wins; 4) total goals scored; 5) head-to-head points; 6) head-to-head goal goals scored; 7) fewest disciplinary points; 8) coin toss (if 2 clubs tied) or drawing of lots (if ≥3 clubs tied).
(C) Champions; (S) NWSL Shield

==== Tiebreakers ====
The initial determining factor for a team's position in the standings is most points earned, with three points earned for a win, one point for a draw, and zero points for a loss. If two or more teams tie in total points total when determining rank, playoff qualification, and seeding, the NWSL uses the following tiebreaker criteria, going down the list until all teams are ranked.

1. Greater goal difference across the entire regular season (against all teams, not just tied teams).
2. Most total wins across the entire regular season (against all teams, not just tied teams).
3. Most goals scored across the entire regular season (against all teams, not just tied teams).
4. Head-to-head results (total points) between the tied teams.
5. Head-to-head most goals scored between the tied teams.
6. Fewest disciplinary points accumulated across the entire regular season (against all teams, not just tied teams).
7. Coin flip (if two teams are tied) or drawing of lots (if three or more teams are tied).

=== Results ===
| Home \ Away | BAY | BOS | CHI | DEN | GFC | HOU | KC | LA | LOU | NC | ORL | POR | SD | SEA | UTA | WAS |
|---|---|---|---|---|---|---|---|---|---|---|---|---|---|---|---|---|
| Bay FC | — | 1–1 | 0–1 | 2–1 | 0–1 | 1–0 | 1–2 | 1–3 | 2–0 | 3–0 | 1–3 | 2–2 | 0–1 | 2–3 | 0–0 | 0–2 |
| Boston Legacy FC | 2–2 | — | 2–0 | 3–2 | 0–1 | 1–2 | 1–0 | 2–5 | 2–1 | 2–2 | 2–1 | 3–4 | 0–1 | 1–2 | 1–2 | 1–2 |
| Chicago Stars FC | 0–0 | 2–0 | — | 0–3 | 0–2 | 1–3 | 2–1 | 0–2 | 3–2 | 0–6 | 0–3 | 0–2 | 0–2 | 1–3 | 3–2 | 0–3 |
| Denver Summit FC | 2–2 | 1–1 | 6–1 | — | 3–0 | 2–2 | 0–3 | 2–3 | 6–1 | 0–2 | 3–1 | 2–1 | 2–3 | 2–1 | 2–1 | 0–0 |
| Gotham FC | 3–0 | 1–1 | 3–1 | 0–2 | — | 1–0 | 2–1 | 1–1 | 1–0 | 0–0 | 0–0 | 1–1 | 1–0 | 3–2 | 2–0 | 1–0 |
| Houston Dash | 1–0 | 3–0 | 5–0 | 1–4 | 0–1 | — | 1–1 | 2–1 | 4–3 | 0–1 | 1–2 | 0–2 | 2–2 | 0–0 | 0–1 | 2–3 |
| Kansas City Current | 5–1 | 1–0 | 3–0 | 4–1 | 2–1 | 3–0 | — | 1–1 | 5–1 | 3–2 | 2–2 | 3–1 | 2–2 | 1–1 | 2–1 | 2–1 |
| Angel City FC | 2–0 | 4–1 | 4–0 | 3–3 | 0–0 | 2–1 | 2–1 | — | 1–2 | 1–2 | 2–0 | 1–2 | 1–2 | 3–1 | 0–1 | 1–1 |
| Racing Louisville FC | 0–2 | 4–1 | 2–1 | 0–1 | 1–2 | 1–1 | 0–2 | 0–2 | — | 1–2 | 3–2 | 3–1 | 0–2 | 2–1 | 1–1 | 2–2 |
| North Carolina Courage | 1–3 | 2–1 | 4–0 | 1–0 | 1–2 | 2–3 | 1–2 | 2–0 | 2–1 | — | 5–0 | 2–2 | 1–2 | 3–1 | 1–4 | 0–2 |
| Orlando Pride | 3–1 | 0–1 | 1–0 | 1–1 | 1–2 | 3–1 | 3–0 | 2–1 | 1–3 | 1–0 | — | 1–4 | 1–2 | 1–2 | 1–2 | 2–4 |
| Portland Thorns FC | 2–0 | 2–4 | 1–1 | 1–0 | 2–2 | 1–1 | 2–0 | 0–0 | 4–0 | 1–0 | 2–1 | — | 2–0 | 2–0 | 2–2 | 1–2 |
| San Diego Wave FC | 0–1 | 2–2 | 2–0 | 1–1 | 2–0 | 0–1 | 2–0 | 0–2 | 3–2 | 2–1 | 0–1 | 3–1 | — | 0–2 | 4–2 | 2–1 |
| Seattle Reign FC | 2–0 | 2–0 | 1–0 | 0–0 | 0–2 | 1–0 | 3–0 | 2–2 | 2–1 | 0–1 | 1–0 | 2–0 | 1–0 | — | 0–3 | 0–1 |
| Utah Royals | 3–2 | 1–2 | 1–0 | 2–1 | 1–3 | 2–0 | 0–2 | 0–3 | 2–1 | 2–1 | 1–0 | 5–1 | 1–2 | 0–0 | — | 0–1 |
| Washington Spirit | 1–0 | 0–3 | 2–0 | 1–0 | 1–0 | 2–1 | 4–0 | 0–1 | 1–0 | 3–4 | 0–1 | 0–1 | 0–1 | 2–1 | 1–1 | — |

Source: NWSL
Legend: Blue = home team win; Yellow = draw; Red = away team win.

== Attendance ==
=== Average home attendances ===
Ranked from highest to lowest average attendance.

Regular season
| Rank | Team | GP | Attendance | High | Low | Average |
|---|---|---|---|---|---|---|
| 1 | Portland Thorns FC | 15 | 286,096 | 22,017 | 15,683 | 19,073 |
| 2 | Denver Summit FC | 15 | 250,345 | 63,004 | 11,008 | 16,690 |
| 3 | Washington Spirit | 15 | 243,904 | 19,365 | 9,349 | 16,260 |
| 4 | Angel City FC | 15 | 237,763 | 20,548 | 11,574 | 15,851 |
| 5 | San Diego Wave FC | 15 | 184,260 | 15,881 | 8,428 | 12,284 |
| 6 | Bay FC | 15 | 181,896 | 15,927 | 10,237 | 12,126 |
| 7 | Kansas City Current | 15 | 179,000 | 18,000 | 11,500 | 11,933 |
| 8 | Gotham FC | 15 | 164,142 | 42,175 | 4,738 | 10,943 |
| 9 | Boston Legacy FC | 15 | 162,135 | 30,207 | 3,804 | 10,809 |
| 10 | Utah Royals | 15 | 139,907 | 19,274 | 5,572 | 9,327 |
| 11 | North Carolina Courage | 15 | 125,464 | 10,803 | 6,217 | 8,364 |
| 12 | Orlando Pride | 15 | 123,738 | 16,320 | 6,004 | 8,249 |
| 13 | Seattle Reign FC | 15 | 117,945 | 16,095 | 3,023 | 7,863 |
| 14 | Houston Dash | 15 | 103,748 | 10,259 | 5,168 | 6,917 |
| 15 | Racing Louisville FC | 15 | 81,803 | 7,018 | 4,528 | 5,454 |
| 16 | Chicago Stars FC | 15 | 68,281 | 6,678 | 1,821 | 4,552 |
| | Total | 240 | 2,650,427 | 63,004 | 1,821 | 11,043 |

Updated through November 1, 2026

- Seattle Reign FC's first three home matches were played at One Spokane Stadium while their home stadium of Lumen Field underwent renovations.
- Seven of Boston Legacy FC's home matches were played at Centreville Bank Stadium while their home stadium of Gillette Stadium was in use during the 2026 FIFA World Cup.
- Kansas City Current expanded CPKC Stadium's capacity by 500 to 12,000 for the October 25 home match, and sold an estimated 6,000 additional tickets for guests to watch a televised simulcast on screens outside of the stadium. Match reports conflict on the match's attendance and cite both the 12,000 stadium attendance and 18,000 grounds attendance.
- Angel City FC's final home match on November 1 was moved to Dignity Health Sports Park due to a scheduling conflict.

=== Highest attendances ===
Regular season
| Rank | Home team | Score | Away team | Attendance | Date | Stadium |
|---|---|---|---|---|---|---|
| 1 | Denver Summit FC | 0–0 | Washington Spirit | 63,004 | March 28, 2026 | Empower Field at Mile High |
| 2 | Gotham FC | 1–0 | Washington Spirit | 42,175 | July 15, 2026 | Citi Field |
| 3 | Boston Legacy FC | 0–1 | Gotham FC | 30,207 | March 14, 2026 | Gillette Stadium |
| 4 | Portland Thorns FC | 1–0 | Denver Summit FC | 22,017 | August 22, 2026 | Providence Park |
| 5 | Portland Thorns FC | 2–2 | Gotham FC | 21,743 | July 24, 2026 | Providence Park |
| 6 | Portland Thorns FC | 2–0 | Seattle Reign FC | 21,321 | March 20, 2026 | Providence Park |
| 7 | Portland Thorns FC | 0–0 | Angel City FC | 20,652 | May 17, 2026 | Providence Park |
| 8 | Angel City FC | 2–0 | Bay FC | 20,548 | October 24, 2026 | BMO Stadium |
| 9 | Portland Thorns FC | 1-0 | North Carolina Courage | 20,105 | October 23, 2026 | Providence Park |
| 10 | Portland Thorns FC | 2-2 | Utah Royals | 20,053 | May 30, 2026 | Providence Park |

Updated through November 1, 2026

== Statistical leaders ==
As of November 1, 2026.

=== Top scorers ===
| Rank | Player | Club | Goals |
|---|---|---|---|
| 1 | (United States) Ashley Sanchez | North Carolina Courage | 20 |
| 2 | (Zambia) Barbra Banda | Orlando Pride | 17 |
| 3 | (United States) Sophia Wilson | Portland Thorns FC | 15 |
| 4 | (United States) Trinity Byars | San Diego Wave FC | 12 |
| 4 | (Malawi) Temwa Chawinga | Kansas City Current | 12 |
| 4 | (United States) Trinity Rodman | Washington Spirit | 12 |
| 4 | (Canada) Janine Sonis | Denver Summit FC | 12 |
| 8 | (Brazil) Amanda Gutierres | Boston Legacy FC | 11 |
| 8 | (United States) Haley Hopkins | Kansas City Current | 11 |
| 8 | (Sweden) Evelyn Ijeh | North Carolina Courage | 11 |
| 8 | (United States) Jaedyn Shaw | Gotham FC | 11 |

=== Top assists ===
| Rank | Player | Club | Assists |
|---|---|---|---|
| 1 | (United States) Croix Bethune | Kansas City Current | 11 |
| 2 | (Canada) Cloé Lacasse | Utah Royals | 10 |
| 3 | (United States) Pietra Tordin | Portland Thorns FC | 9 |
| 4 | (United States) Trinity Rodman | Washington Spirit | 8 |
| 4 | (United States) Evelyn Shores | Angel City FC | 8 |
| 4 | (Canada) Janine Sonis | Denver Summit FC | 8 |
| 7 | (United States) Lauren Milliet | Racing Louisville FC | 7 |
| 8 | (United States) Lia Godfrey | San Diego Wave FC | 6 |
| 8 | (Japan) Shinomi Koyama | North Carolina Courage | 6 |
| 8 | (Norway) Guro Reiten | Gotham FC | 6 |
| 8 | (United States) Yazmeen Ryan | Denver Summit FC | 6 |

=== Clean sheets ===
| Rank | Player | Club | Clean sheets |
|---|---|---|---|
| 1 | (Scotland) Sandy MacIver | Washington Spirit | 12 |
| 2 | (Germany) Ann-Katrin Berger | Gotham FC | 11 |
| 3 | (United States) Angelina Anderson | Angel City FC | 10 |
| 4 | (Australia) Mackenzie Arnold | Portland Thorns FC | 9 |
| 4 | (United States) Claudia Dickey | Seattle Reign FC | 9 |
| 4 | (Canada) Kailen Sheridan | North Carolina Courage | 9 |
| 7 | (United States) Jordan Silkowitz | Bay FC | 7 |
| 8 | (England) Anna Moorhouse | Orlando Pride | 6 |
| 9 | (United States) Jane Campbell | Houston Dash | 5 |
| 9 | (Brazil) Lorena | Kansas City Current | 5 |
| 9 | (United States) Mandy McGlynn | Utah Royals | 5 |
| 9 | (United States) Abby Smith | Denver Summit FC | 5 |

=== Hat-tricks ===
| Player | For | Against | Score | Date | Ref. |
|---|---|---|---|---|---|
| (Malawi) Temwa Chawinga | Kansas City Current | vs. Chicago Stars FC | 3–0 | May 10, 2026 | |
| (Sweden) Evelyn Ijeh | North Carolina Courage | vs. Orlando Pride | 5–0 | July 31, 2026 | |
| (United States) Pietra Tordin | Portland Thorns FC | vs. Boston Legacy FC | 4–3 | August 9, 2026 | |
| (United States) Ashley Sanchez | North Carolina Courage | vs. Chicago Stars FC | 6–0 | September 6, 2026 | |
| (United States) Haley Hopkins | Kansas City Current | vs. Denver Summit FC | 4–1 | September 26, 2026 | |
| (Brazil) Debinha | Kansas City Current | vs. Bay FC | 5–1 | October 3, 2026 | |

== Playoffs ==
=== Bracket ===
Quarterfinals
1 | Gotham FC | 1
8 | Seattle Reign FC | 0
4 | Kansas City Current | 1 (a.e.t.)
5 | Angel City FC | 0
3 | Washington Spirit | 4
6 | Portland Thorns FC | 1
2 | San Diego Wave FC | 0
7 | Utah Royals | 1

Semifinals
1 | Gotham FC | 1
4 | Kansas City Current | 2
3 | Washington Spirit | 2
7 | Utah Royals | 1

Championship
3 | Washington Spirit | 1
4 | Kansas City Current | 2

=== Quarterfinals ===
November 6, 2026
10:00 pm ET

| San Diego Wave FC | 0–1 | Utah Royals |
|---|---|---|
| | Report | Palacios 30' |

Snapdragon Stadium, San Diego, California
Attendance: 12,638
Referee: Katja Koroleva
November 7, 2026
12:00 pm ET

| Kansas City Current | 1–0 (a.e.t.) | Angel City FC |
|---|---|---|
| Cooper 96' (pen.) | Report |

CPKC Stadium, Kansas City, Missouri
Attendance: 11,500
Referee: Alexandra Billeter
November 8, 2026
12:30 pm ET

| Gotham FC | 1–0 | Seattle Reign FC |
|---|---|---|
| Bugg 4' (o.g.) | Report |

Sports Illustrated Stadium, Harrison, New Jersey
Attendance: 11,328
Referee: Brad Jensen
November 8, 2026
3:00 pm ET

| Washington Spirit | 4–1 | Portland Thorns FC |
|---|---|---|
| Bethi 6'; Luvanga 34'; Rodman 35', 58' | Report | Tordin 51'; Perry (yellow card) 47' (yellow-red card) 88' |

Audi Field, Washington, District of Columbia
Attendance: 19,215
Referee: Nabil Bensalah

=== Semifinals ===
November 14, 2026
12:00 pm ET

| Washington Spirit | 2–1 | Utah Royals |
|---|---|---|
| Cantore 8'; Luvanga 56' | Report | Lacasse 2' |

Audi Field, Washington, D.C.
Attendance: 19,365
Referee: Calin Radosav
November 15, 2026
3:00 pm ET

| Gotham FC | 1–2 | Kansas City Current |
|---|---|---|
| Rouse 69' (o.g.) | Report | Bethune 20'; Hopkins 89' |

Icahn Stadium, New York, New York
Referee: Alyssa Pennington

=== Championship ===
November 21, 2026
8:00 p.m. EST

| Washington Spirit | 1–2 | Kansas City Current |
|---|---|---|
| | Report |

Audi Field, Washington, D.C.
Referee: Joshua Encarnacion

== Challenge Cup ==
June 26, 2026
8:00 pm EDT

| Gotham FC | 2–0 | Kansas City Current |
|---|---|---|
| González 37' (pen.); Dudley 79' | Report |

ScottsMiracle-Gro Field, Columbus, Ohio
Attendance: 11,369
Referee: Brad Jensen

== Individual awards ==
=== Annual awards ===
| Award | Winner | | Nominees | Ref. |
|---|---|---|---|---|
| Golden Boot | (United States) Ashley Sanchez | North Carolina Courage | N/A | |
| Most Valuable Player | (United States) Ashley Sanchez | North Carolina Courage | (Malawi) Temwa Chaŵinga, Kansas City Current (United States) Trinity Rodman, Washington Spirit (Canada) Janine Sonis, Denver Summit FC (United States) Sophia Wilson, Portland Thorns FC | |
| Defender of the Year | (Canada) Janine Sonis | Denver Summit FC | (United States) Tierna Davidson, Gotham FC (United States) Kate Del Fava, Utah Royals (United States) Sarah Gorden, Angel City FC (United States) Kennedy Wesley, San Diego Wave FC | |
| Midfielder of the Year | (United States) Croix Bethune | Kansas City Current | (France) Kenza Dali, San Diego Wave FC (United States) Jaelin Howell, Gotham FC (United States) Rose Lavelle, Gotham FC (Japan) Mina Tanaka, Utah Royals | |
| Goalkeeper of the Year | (Germany) Ann-Katrin Berger | Gotham FC | (United States) Jane Campbell, Houston Dash (United States) Jordan Silkowitz, Bay FC | |
| Rookie of the Year | (United States) Jordynn Dudley | Gotham FC | (United States) Kat Rader, Houston Dash (Jamaica) Mimi Van Zanten, San Diego Wave FC | |
| Coach of the Year | (Belgium) Jimmy Coenraets | Utah Royals | Jonas Eidevall, San Diego Wave FC (Spain) Juan Carlos Amorós, Gotham FC | |
| Lauren Holiday Impact Award | (United States) Savy King | Angel City FC | | |

==== Teams of the Year ====
Best XI
| Position | Player | Club |
|---|---|---|
| GK | (Germany) Ann-Katrin Berger | Gotham FC |
| DF | (Canada) Janine Sonis | Denver Summit FC |
| DF | (United States) Tierna Davidson | Gotham FC |
| DF | (United States) Kate Del Fava | Utah Royals |
| DF | (Jamaica) Mimi Van Zanten | San Diego Wave FC |
| MF | (France) Kenza Dali | San Diego Wave FC |
| MF | (United States) Jaelin Howell | Gotham FC |
| MF | (United States) Croix Bethune | Kansas City Current |
| FW | (United States) Sophia Wilson | Portland Thorns FC |
| FW | (United States) Ashley Sanchez | North Carolina Courage |
| FW | (United States) Trinity Rodman | Washington Spirit |

Second XI
| Position | Player | Club |
|---|---|---|
| GK | (United States) Jane Campbell | Houston Dash |
| DF | (United States) Gisele Thompson | Angel City FC |
| DF | (United States) Sarah Gorden | Angel City FC |
| DF | (United States) Kennedy Wesley | San Diego Wave FC |
| DF | (United States) Evelyn Shores | Angel City FC |
| MF | (Japan) Mina Tanaka | Utah Royals FC |
| MF | (United States) Rose Lavelle | Gotham FC |
| MF | (United States) Kimmi Ascanio | San Diego Wave FC |
| FW | (Malawi) Temwa Chawinga | Kansas City Current |
| FW | (Zambia) Barbra Banda | Orlando Pride |
| FW | (Iceland) Sveindís Jane Jónsdóttir | Angel City FC |

=== Weekly awards ===
As of September 4, 2026

| Week | Player of the Week | | Save of the Week | | Ref. |
| Week | Player | Club | Player | Club | Ref. |
|---|---|---|---|---|---|
| 1 | (United States) Ashley Sanchez | North Carolina Courage | (United States) Jordyn Bloomer | Racing Louisville FC | |
| 2 | (Iceland) Sveindís Jónsdóttir | Angel City FC | (United States) Abby Smith | Denver Summit FC | |
| 3 | (United States) Lia Godfrey | San Diego Wave FC | (United States) Morgan Messner | Portland Thorns FC | |
| 4 | (Jamaica) Kiki Van Zanten | Houston Dash | (Germany) Kathrin Hendrich | Chicago Stars FC | |
| 5 | (Colombia) Leicy Santos | Washington Spirit | (United States) Katie Atkinson | Chicago Stars FC | |
| 6 | (United States) Trinity Rodman | Washington Spirit | (United States) Jordan Silkowitz | Bay FC | |
| 7 | (Malawi) Temwa Chawinga | Kansas City Current | (Colombia) Jorelyn Carabalí | Boston Legacy FC | |
| 8 | (Canada) Janine Sonis | Denver Summit FC | (United States) Angelina Anderson | Angel City FC | |
| 9 | (United States) Sophia Wilson | Portland Thorns FC | (United States) Malia Berkely | Houston Dash | |
| 10 | (Japan) Manaka Matsukubo | North Carolina Courage | (Canada) Kailen Sheridan | North Carolina Courage | |
| 11 | (United States) Trinity Rodman (2) | Washington Spirit | (United States) Jane Campbell | Houston Dash | |
| 12 | (Spain) Esther González | Gotham FC | (Germany) Ann-Katrin Berger | Gotham FC | |
| 13 | (United States) Rose Lavelle | Gotham FC | (Canada) Kailen Sheridan (2) | North Carolina Courage | |
| 14 | (United States) Maja Lardner | Racing Louisville FC | (United States) Katie Atkinson (2) | Chicago Stars FC | |
| 15 | (Sweden) Evelyn Ijeh | North Carolina Courage | (United States) Mandy McGlynn | Utah Royals | |
| 16 | (United States) Pietra Tordin | Portland Thorns FC | (Australia) Mackenzie Arnold | Portland Thorns FC | |
| 17 | (United States) Caiya Hanks | Portland Thorns FC | | | |
| 18 | (United States) Ashley Sanchez (2) | North Carolina Courage | (United States) Angelina Anderson (2) | Angel City FC | |
| 19 | (United States) Trinity Byars | San Diego Wave FC | | | |
| 20 | No award | | | | |
| 21 | (United States) Ashley Sanchez (3) | North Carolina Courage | (Scotland) Sandy MacIver | Washington Spirit | |
| 22 | (United States) Alyssa Naeher | Chicago Stars FC | | | |
| 23 | (United States) Sophia Wilson (2) | Portland Thorns FC | | | |

| Week | Goal of the Week | | Assist of the Week | | Ref. |
| Week | Player | Club | Player | Club | Ref. |
|---|---|---|---|---|---|
| 1 | (United States) Ashley Sanchez | North Carolina Courage | (Iceland) Sveindís Jónsdóttir | Angel City FC | |
| 2 | (Italy) Sofia Cantore | Washington Spirit | (United States) Kennedy Fuller | Angel City FC | |
| 3 | (United States) Melanie Barcenas | San Diego Wave FC | (United States) Jayden Perry | Portland Thorns FC | |
| 4 | (United States) Gisele Thompson | Angel City FC | (United States) Jayden Perry (2) | Portland Thorns FC | |
| 5 | (United States) Sophia Wilson | Portland Thorns FC | (United States) Trinity Rodman | Washington Spirit | |
| 6 | (Mali) Aïssata Traoré | Boston Legacy FC | (United States) Olivia Moultrie | Portland Thorns FC | |
| 7 | (United States) Katie O'Kane | Racing Louisville FC | (Brazil) Dudinha | San Diego Wave FC | |
| 8 | (Japan) Manaka Matsukubo | North Carolina Courage | (United States) Michelle Cooper | Kansas City Current | |
| 9 | (United States) M.A. Vignola | Portland Thorns FC | (United States) Delanie Sheehan | Denver Summit FC | |
| 10 | (Colombia) Leicy Santos | Washington Spirit | (United States) Riley Jackson | North Carolina Courage | |
| 11 | (United States) Melanie Barcenas (2) | San Diego Wave FC | (Colombia) Leicy Santos | Washington Spirit | |
| 12 | (Colombia) Leicy Santos (2) | Washington Spirit | (United States) Tara Rudd | Washington Spirit | |
| 13 | (United States) Rose Lavelle | Gotham FC | (Nigeria) Gift Monday | Washington Spirit | |
| 14 | (Italy) Sofia Cantore (2) | Washington Spirit | (United States) Sophia Mattice | Angel City FC | |
| 15 | (Mexico) Kiana Palacios | Utah Royals | (United States) Casey Murphy | Boston Legacy FC | |
| 16 | (United States) Ashley Sanchez (2) | North Carolina Courage | (Australia) Mackenzie Arnold | Portland Thorns FC | |
| 17 | (United States) Mallory Swanson | Chicago Stars FC | (United States) Melanie Barcenas | San Diego Wave FC | |
| 18 | (United States) Izzy Rodriguez | Kansas City Current | (United States) Mandy McGlynn | Utah Royals | |

=== Monthly awards ===
| Month | Rookie of the Month | | Player of the Month | | Ref. |
| Month | Player | Club | Player | Club | Ref. |
|---|---|---|---|---|---|
| March | (United States) Lia Godfrey | San Diego Wave FC | (Iceland) Sveindís Jane Jónsdóttir | Angel City FC | |
| April | (United States) Jordynn Dudley | Gotham FC | (United States) Ashley Sanchez | North Carolina Courage | |
| May | (United States) Kat Rader | Houston Dash | (Malawi) Temwa Chawinga | Kansas City Current | |
| July | (United States) Linda Ullmark | Houston Dash | (United States) Trinity Rodman | Washington Spirit | |
| August | (United States) Kat Rader (2) | Houston Dash | (United States) Ashley Sanchez (2) | North Carolina Courage | |

| Month | Coach of the Month | | Ref. |
| Month | Coach | Club | Ref. |
|---|---|---|---|
| March | (Norway) Alexander Straus | Angel City FC | |
| April | (Spain) Adrián González | Washington Spirit | |
| May | (Belgium) Jimmy Coenraets | Utah Royals | |
| July | (Spain) Adrián González (2) | Washington Spirit | |
| August | (Lebanon) Mak Lind | North Carolina Courage | |

==== Team of the Month ====
| Month | Goalkeeper | Defenders | Midfielders | Forwards | Ref. |
|---|---|---|---|---|---|
| March | (United States) Abby Smith, DEN | (England) Jess Carter, GFC; (United States) Sofia Huerta, SEA; (United States) Gisele Thompson, LA; (United States) Kennedy Wesley, SD | (France) Kenza Dali, SD; (United States) Lia Godfrey, SD; (United States) Olivia Moultrie, POR | (Zambia) Barbra Banda, ORL; (Brazil) Dudinha, SD; (Iceland) Sveindís Jónsdóttir, LA | |
| April | (Scotland) Sandy MacIver, WAS | (United States) Sam Hiatt, POR; (England) Esme Morgan, WAS; (United States) Tara Rudd, WAS; (United States) Kennedy Wesley, SD (2) | (United States) Rose Lavelle, GFC; (United States) Ashley Sanchez, NC; (Colombia) Leicy Santos, WAS | (Zambia) Barbra Banda, ORL (2); (United States) Trinity Rodman, WAS; (Jamaica) Kiki van Zanten, HOU | |
| May | (United States) Mandy McGlynn, UTA | (Canada) Janine Sonis, DEN; (United States) Sam Hiatt, POR (2); (United States) Kate Del Fava, UTA; (United States) Tierna Davidson, GFC | (Japan) Manaka Matsukubo, NC; (United States) Kimmi Ascanio, SD; (United States) Croix Bethune, KC | (Malawi) Temwa Chawinga, KC; (Zambia) Barbra Banda, ORL (3); (Japan) Mina Tanaka, UTA | |
| July | (Scotland) Sandy MacIver, WAS (2) | (Norway) Guro Reiten, GFC; (United States) Tara Rudd, WAS (2); (United States) Kate Del Fava, UTA (2); (Canada) Janine Sonis, DEN (2) | (United States) Jaelin Howell, GFC; (United States) Croix Bethune, KC (2); (United States) Rose Lavelle, GFC (2) | (Sweden) Evelyn Ijeh, NC; (Spain) Esther González, GFC; (United States) Trinity Rodman, WAS (2) | |
| August | (Germany) Ann-Katrin Berger, GFC | (Canada) Janine Sonis, DEN (3); (United States) Tierna Davidson, GFC (2); (United States) Sarah Gorden, LA; (United States) Lauren Milliet, LOU | (United States) Croix Bethune, KC (3); (Japan) Mina Tanaka, UTA (2); (United States) Kat Rader, HOU | (United States) Ashley Sanchez, NC (2); (Sweden) Evelyn Ijeh, NC (2); (United States) Emma Sears, LOU | |

== See also ==
- 2025–26 CONCACAF W Champions Cup (continental club tournament with NWSL teams)
