= Haley Hopkins =

American soccer player (born 1998)

- Hopkins with the Kansas City Current in 2026

Personal information
- Full name: Haley Elizabeth Hopkins
- Date of birth: December 21, 1998 (age 27)
- Place of birth: Newport Beach, California, U.S.
- Height: 5 ft 10 in (1.78 m)
- Position: Forward

Team information
- Current team: Kansas City Current
- Number: 13

Youth career
- Slammers FC

College career
Years	Team	Apps	(Gls)
2017–2021	Vanderbilt Commodores	58	(34)
2021–2022	Virginia Cavaliers	46	(22)

Senior career*
Years	Team	Apps	(Gls)
2023–2024	North Carolina Courage	36	(4)
2025–	Kansas City Current	50	(13)
- * Club domestic league appearances and goals as of November 1, 2026

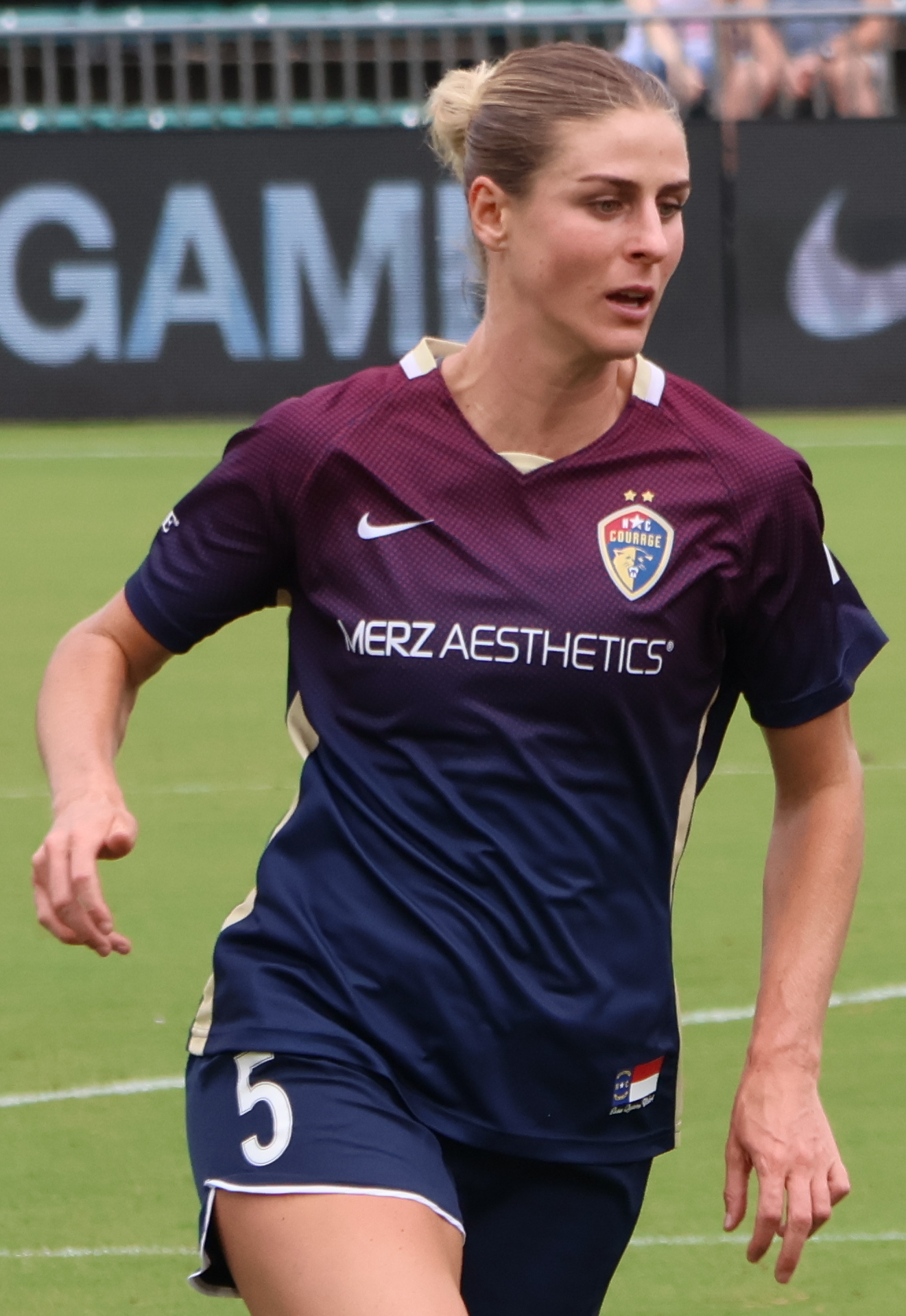
Hopkins with the North Carolina Courage in 2023

Haley Elizabeth Hopkins (born December 21, 1998) is an American professional soccer player who plays as a forward for the Kansas City Current of the National Women's Soccer League (NWSL). She has been the president of the NWSL Players Association since 2025.

Hopkins played college soccer for the Vanderbilt Commodores and the Virginia Cavaliers, earning All-American honors twice. She was selected by the North Carolina Courage in the first round of the 2023 NWSL Draft. After two seasons, she was traded to the Current, where she won the NWSL Shield in 2025 and the NWSL Championship in 2026.

== Early life ==
Hopkins grew up in Newport Beach, California, one of four children born to David and Beth Hopkins. Her father played college football and baseball at Virginia and was drafted by the Texas Rangers in the 1982 MLB draft. Hopkins began playing soccer at age four. She attended Mater Dei High School and played ECNL club soccer for Slammers FC.

== College career ==
Hopkins played only one game for the Commodores soccer team as a freshman in 2017, because of knee pain that required multiple surgeries. In 2018, as a redshirt freshman, she led the Commodores with 14 goals and 7 assists in 21 games and was named the Southeastern Conference (SEC) Freshman of the Year. She again led the team with 13 goals in 21 games as a redshirt sophomore in 2019. She dealt with injuries the next year but still provided a team-best 7 goals in 15 games and helped the Commodores win the SEC tournament, scoring two goals in the competition. She left Vanderbilt with the second-most goals in program history (34) and was a three-time All-SEC and two-time All-American third-team selection.

Hopkins joined the Virginia Cavaliers as a graduate transfer in 2021, enrolling in the University of Virginia School of Medicine. She scored two goals in her debut and finished the season with 8 goals and 9 assists in 23 games, winning the Atlantic Coast Conference (ACC) regular-season title. In her second season with the Cavaliers in 2022, she scored 14 goals and 5 assists in 23 games. In the NCAA tournament, she scored in overtime against Penn State to help the Cavaliers advance to the quarterfinals. Both years in Virginia, she was an All-ACC selection.

== Club career ==
=== North Carolina Courage ===
The North Carolina Courage selected Hopkins with the 11th overall pick in the 2023 NWSL Draft. She was signed to a three-year contract. She made her professional debut on April 1, coming on as a substitute for Olivia Wingate in a 3–1 loss to the San Diego Wave. On July 29, she scored her first professional goals, netting twice to conclude a 5–0 win over the Orlando Pride in the NWSL Challenge Cup. On September 2, she scored her first NWSL regular-season goal and assisted Kerolin in a 3–3 draw against NJ/NY Gotham FC. The following week, she made just her third professional start in the Challenge Cup final, helping the Courage prevail 2–0 against Racing Louisville. She finished her rookie season with 3 goals in 20 games in all competitions.

Hopkins began her second season with goals against the Houston Dash and the Portland Thorns in two of the Courage's first three home games at WakeMed Soccer Park. She established herself as a starter under Sean Nahas, though she would find the back of the net only once more in the rest of the regular season. On July 31, 2024, she scored a goal and assisted Ashley Sanchez in a 3–0 win against Monterrey, clinching the Courage's place in the NWSL x Liga MX Femenil Summer Cup semifinals. She ended the season with 4 goals in 28 games in all competitions.

=== Kansas City Current ===
On January 30, 2025, Hopkins was traded to the Kansas City Current for $50,000 in intraleague transfer funds. She signed a two-year contract extension through 2027. On April 26, she made her first start and scored her first goal for the Current in her return to WakeMed, though the Courage won the match 3–2. In July, she was named the Teal Rising Cup MVP after scoring twice against Palmeiras in the Current-hosted exhibition tournament. She finished the season with 1 goal in 21 appearances in all competitions as the Current won their first NWSL Shield, though lost 2–1 to eventual champions Gotham FC in the playoff quarterfinals.

On March 22, 2026, Hopkins scored her first goal of the season in a 2–1 loss to the Chicago Stars. The next month, she was named the Teal Rising Cup MVP for the second year after scoring a hat trick against Palmeiras in the exhibition final. Following the June departure of Ally Sentnor, Kansas City head coach Chris Armas gave Hopkins a regular place in the starting lineup. On July 29, she scored twice in a 5–1 win over Racing Louisville, the first brace of her NWSL career. The next game, she scored her fifth goal of the season in a 1–1 draw with Angel City FC, setting a new career high. On September 26, she scored her first NWSL hat trick in a 4–1 victory over the Denver Summit. She closed the regular season on a scoring run of seven goals in five games, leading to her selection as NWSL Player of the Month for October/November. In the playoffs, she scored an 89th-minute volley against Gotham FC in semifinals, giving Kansas City the 2-1 win and securing a berth to the 2026 NWSL Championship.

== Personal life ==
In July 2024, Hopkins was one of five active players who represented the NWSL Players Association (NWSLPA) at the final negotiations in Philadelphia that updated the league's collective bargaining agreement through 2030. In March 2025, she was voted by her fellow players as the fourth president of the NWSLPA, succeeding Tori Huster.

== Honors and awards ==
Vanderbilt Commodores

- Southeastern Conference tournament: 2020

Virginia Cavaliers

- Atlantic Coast Conference: 2021

North Carolina Courage

- NWSL Challenge Cup: 2023

Kansas City Current

- NWSL Championship: 2026
- NWSL Shield: 2025

Individual

- NWSL Player of the Month: October/November 2026
- Teal Rising Cup MVP: 2025, 2026
- Third-team All-American: 2018, 2020
- First-team All-SEC: 2018, 2020
- Second-team All-SEC: 2019
- Second-team All-ACC: 2022
- Third-team All-ACC: 2021
- SEC Freshman of the Year: 2018
- SEC tournament all-tournament team: 2019, 2020
- ACC tournament all-tournament team: 2021
