= Michelle Cooper =

American soccer player (born 2002)

- Cooper with the Kansas City Current in 2026

Personal information
- Full name: Michelle Ivory Cooper
- Date of birth: December 4, 2002 (age 23)
- Place of birth: Detroit, Michigan, U.S.
- Height: 1.60 m (5 ft 3 in)
- Position: Forward

Team information
- Current team: Kansas City Current
- Number: 17

Youth career
- 2019–2021: IMG Academy

College career
Years	Team	Apps	(Gls)
2021–2022	Duke Blue Devils	40	(31)

Senior career*
Years	Team	Apps	(Gls)
2023–	Kansas City Current	86	(17)

International career^{‡}
2022	United States U20	3	(1)
2025–	United States	16	(1)
- * Club domestic league appearances and goals as of 16:47, November 14, 2026 (UTC) ‡ National team caps and goals as of October 13, 2026

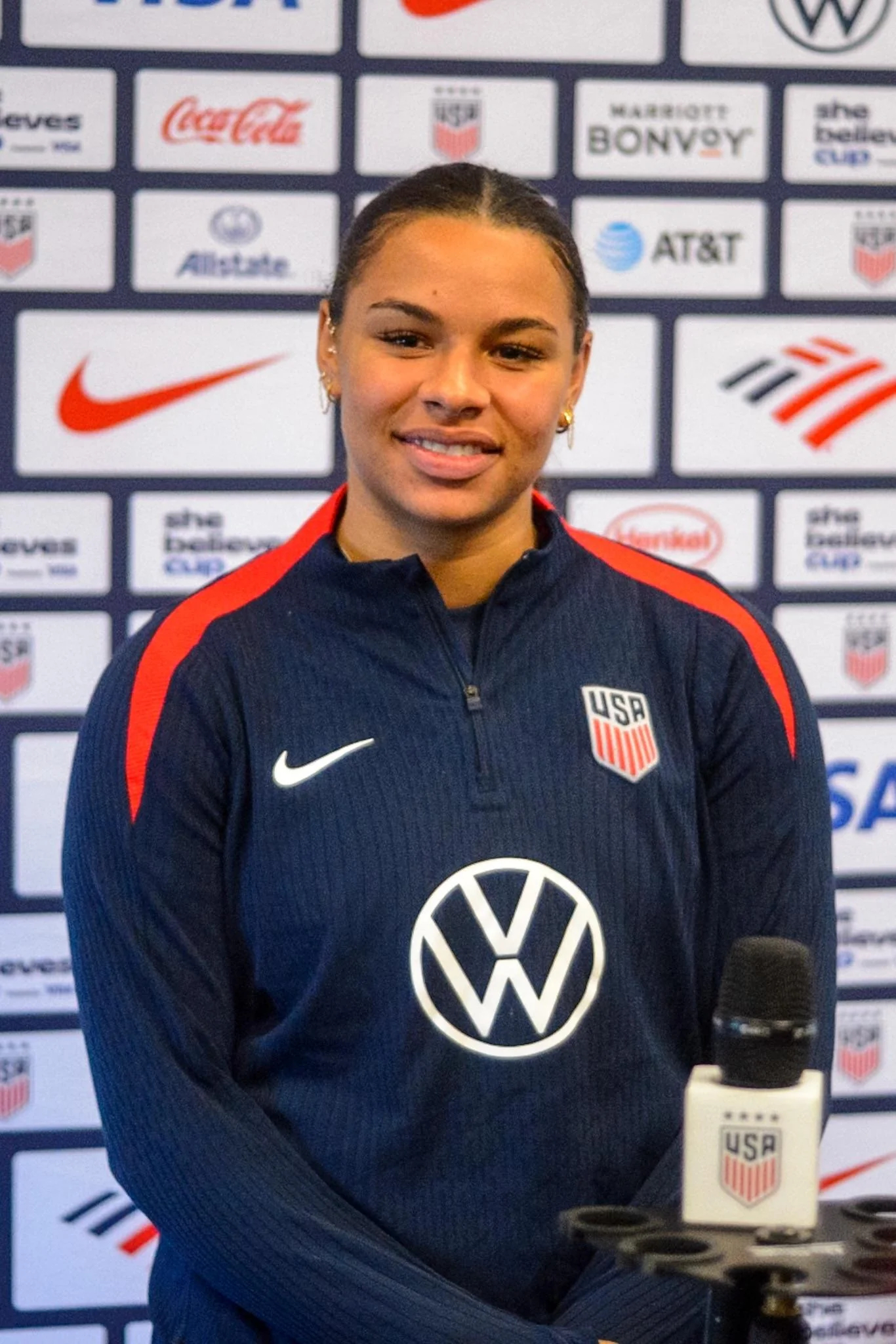
Cooper with the United States in 2025

Michelle Ivory Cooper (born December 4, 2002) is an American professional soccer player who plays as a forward for the Kansas City Current of the National Women's Soccer League (NWSL) and the United States national team. She played two years of college soccer for the Duke Blue Devils, winning the Hermann Trophy in 2022. She was picked second overall by the Current in the 2023 NWSL Draft.

== Early life ==
Cooper was born in Detroit and raised in Clarkston, Michigan. She attended IMG Academy in Florida, captaining the soccer team in her junior and senior seasons. She was ranked by TopDrawerSoccer as the 18th-best recruit of the 2021 class.

== College career ==
Cooper led the Duke Blue Devils with 12 goals (the most by a freshman in program history) and added 5 assists in 18 games in her freshman season in 2021. In the NCAA tournament, she scored two goals in a 7–1 win against St. John's in the third round as Duke reached the national quarterfinals. She was named the TopDrawerSoccer National Freshman of the Year, first-team All-American, first-team All-ACC, and the ACC Freshman of the Year. In her sophomore season, she had an even better year with 19 goals (second in the nation) and 11 assists. She scored the first goal in a 2–1 win against Virginia as Duke made the semifinals of the ACC tournament. In the NCAA tournament, she scored a tournament-joint-high 6 goals through three braces, including in a 3–2 quarterfinal loss to Alabama. She was recognized as first-team All-American, first-team All-ACC, and the ACC Offensive Player of the Year, and became the first Duke Blue Devil to receive the Hermann Trophy as the best player in college soccer. After two seasons in Durham, she registered for the 2023 NWSL Draft, giving up her remaining college eligibility.

== Club career ==
Kansas City Current drafted Cooper with the second overall pick in the 2023 NWSL Draft. The Current had traded Lynn Williams to NJ/NY Gotham FC to acquire the pick. Cooper was signed to a three-year contract. She debuted on March 25, playing the full match in a 1–0 loss to the North Carolina Courage on opening day. On May 17, she scored her first professional goal in a 3–2 loss to Racing Louisville FC in the NWSL Challenge Cup group stage. On June 18, she scored the fastest goal from kickoff in NWSL history in the 22nd second of the Current's 3–2 loss to the Washington Spirit. She finished her rookie regular season with 3 goals and 1 assist in 21 games (17 starts) as the Current placed 11th of 12 teams. She also had 1 goals and 1 assist in 5 starts in the Challenge Cup, helping the Current reach the semifinals.

Cooper scored 1 goal and started all 5 games in the 2024 NWSL x Liga MX Femenil Summer Cup, helping the Current go undefeated to win the tournament. She finished the 2024 regular season with 3 goals and 2 assists in 21 games (15 starts) as Kansas City placed fourth in the league. She started both playoff games for the Current, assisting Debinha in a 3–2 loss to the Orlando Pride in the semifinals.

== International career ==
Cooper played for the United States youth national team at the under-16, under-18, under-19, and under-20 levels. She led the United States to victory at the 2022 CONCACAF Women's U-20 Championship, earning the Golden Boot and Golden Ball awards and making the Best XI team.

Cooper was called up by Emma Hayes into Futures Camp, practicing alongside the senior national team, in January 2025. She received her first call-up to the senior team for the 2025 SheBelieves Cup in February. On February 20, 2025, she made her senior international debut as a substitute against Colombia. Three days later, she scored her first senior international goal six minutes after coming on as a substitute in a 2–1 win against Australia.

== Career statistics ==
=== Club ===
As of match played November 14, 2026

Appearances and goals by club, season and competition
Club	Season	League			NWSL Playoffs		Other		Total	
Club	Season	Division	Apps	Goals	Apps	Goals	Apps	Goals	Apps	Goals
Kansas City Current	2023	NWSL	21	3	—		6 (Note: Appearances in NWSL Challenge Cup)	1	27	4
Kansas City Current	2024	NWSL	21	3	2	0	5 (Note: Appearances in NWSL x Liga MX Femenil Summer Cup)	1	28	4
Kansas City Current	2025	NWSL	20	6	—		—		20	6
Kansas City Current	2026	NWSL	24	5	2	1	1	0	27	6
Career total			86	17	4	1	12	2	102	20

=== International ===
As of match played October 13, 2026

Appearances and goals by national team and year
National team	Year	Apps	Goals
United States	2025	10	1
United States	2026	6	0
Total		16	1

Scores and results list United States's goal tally first, score column indicates score after each Cooper goal.

List of international goals scored by Michelle Cooper
No.	Date	Venue	Opponent	Score	Result	Competition	Ref.
1	February 23, 2025	Glendale, Arizona, United States	Australia	2–0	2–1	2025 SheBelieves Cup	

== Honors and awards ==
Kansas City Current

- NWSL Championship: 2026
- NWSL Shield: 2025
- NWSL x Liga MX Femenil Summer Cup: 2024

United States U20

- CONCACAF Women's U-20 Championship: 2022

Individual

- CONCACAF Women's U-20 Championship Golden Boot: 2022
- CONCACAF Women's U-20 Championship Golden Ball: 2022
- Hermann Trophy: 2022
- NCAA Division I First-Team All-America: 2021, 2022
- ACC Offensive Player of the Year: 2022
- First-team All-ACC: 2021, 2022
- ACC Freshman of the Year: 2021
