= 2026 NWSL Championship =

Women's soccer match in Washington DC, US

- Event: NWSL Championship
Washington Spirit	Kansas City Current
1	2
- Date: November 21, 2026
- Venue: Audi Field, Washington, D.C., U.S.
- Most Valuable Player: Vanessa DiBernardo
- Referee: Joshua Encarnacion
- Attendance: 19,365

The 2026 NWSL Championship was the 13th edition of the NWSL Championship, the championship match of the National Women's Soccer League (NWSL), and took place on November 21, 2026. The match was contested between the Washington Spirit and the Kansas City Current to help determine the champion of the 2026 season. The match was played at the Spirit's home Audi Field in Washington, D.C. The Current won their first NWSL Championship by defeating the Spirit 2–1.

This marked the third league championship victory for an NWSL franchise located in the Kansas City area, following two victories from the former franchise FC Kansas City in the 2014 and 2015 seasons.

== Road to the final ==
=== Washington Spirit ===
After finishing second in the table and losing to Gotham FC in the 2025 NWSL Championship, the Washington Spirit finished in third place in the 2026 regular season after defeating Chicago Stars FC 2–0 on the road in the final regular-season matchweek. The Spirit's leading goalscorer Trinity Rodman scored her 12th goal of the season in the match.

Washington Spirit forward Trinity Rodman challenges Portland Thorns FC defender Carolyn Calzada for the ball during the Spirit's November 8 NWSL playoffs quarterfinals match at Audi Field in Washington, D.C.

In the playoff quarterfinals, the Spirit advanced by beating third-seeded Portland Thorns FC 4–1. Melissa Bethi and Clara Luvanga, both mid-season acquisitions, scored the opening and eventual match-winning goals for Washington, and Rodman added a brace towards the final tally.

After the quarterfinals victory, the Spirit's front office negotiated priority for their home venue of Audi Field, which had been scheduled by venue operators D.C. United to host the Secretaries' Cup NCAA Division III college football game during the semifinal match's broadcast window. The Secretaries' Cup was moved to later in the day, resulting in the semifinals match's pitch bearing both association football and college football lines.

In the semifinals match, the Spirit rallied to win 2–1 against the seventh-seeded Utah Royals. Utah opened scoring with a 2nd-minute Olimpico goal by Utah's Cloe Lacasse, the earliest goal scored to date in an NWSL playoffs match. The Spirit's Sofia Cantore equalized in the 8th minute, and Luvanga scored the Spirit's match-winning goal in the 57th minute.

The Spirit's sellout attendances in both the quarterfinals and semifinals were the team's fifth and sixth consecutive playoff sellouts, and the semifinals win granted the Spirit their third consecutive NWSL Championship finals appearance and fifth appearance all-time. The finals would also be played in their home venue of Audi Field, which had been announced as the predetermined championship site on June 3, 2026.

=== Kansas City Current ===
After winning the NWSL Shield but losing to eventual champions Gotham FC in the 2025 playoff quarterfinals, the Kansas City Current finished fourth in the 2026 regular season to secure their third consecutive playoff berth. Haley Hopkins scored her 12th goal of the season in the season finale against Racing Louisville to match Temwa Chawinga as the club's top scorer of the campaign.

In the playoff quarterfinals, the Current advanced with a 1–0 extra-time victory over fifth-seeded Angel City FC at CPKC Stadium. Michelle Cooper scored the only goal from the penalty spot in first half of extra time after Kayla Sharples was pushed in the box during a corner kick.

In the playoff semifinals, the Current prevailed 2–1 in a rematch of last year's playoffs against new Shield winners Gotham FC. Croix Bethune, signed from Washington before the season, opened the scoring with a bending free kick, but Gotham equalized through an own goal with 20 minutes remaining. Just before the second half ended, Hopkins secured the victory scoring off the crossbar from Izzy Rodriguez's free kick. Kansas City advanced to the second NWSL final in club history following the 2022 NWSL Championship, which they lost to the Thorns.

== Venue and broadcasting ==
The match was officially hosted at Audi Field in Washington, D.C., the Spirit's home venue, as it was a predetermined site. It was televised in the United States on CBS and streamed on Paramount+ plans that rebroadcast to the local CBS affiliates.

== Match ==
=== Details ===
November 21, 2026
8:00 p.m. EST

Washington Spirit	1–2	Kansas City Current
Rodman 90+8'	Report	DiBernardo 54'; Debinha 90+7'

Audi Field, Washington, D.C.
Attendance: 19,365
Referee: Joshua Encarnacion
