= NWSL Championship =

Annual women's soccer game in the US

- Founded: 2013
- Region: National Women's Soccer League (CONCACAF)
- Current champions: Kansas City Current (1st title)
- Most championships: Portland Thorns FC (3 titles)
- Broadcasters: United States: CBS; Paramount+
- Website: nwslsoccer.com
- 2026 NWSL Championship

The NWSL Championship is the annual championship game of the National Women's Soccer League (NWSL), the top-flight women's soccer league in the United States. It is the culmination of the NWSL playoffs, which is contested by the teams with the best record in the preceding regular season.

The NWSL uses a playoff tournament following the regular season to determine its annual league champion, similar to every other major North American sports league. This format differs from most soccer leagues around the world, which consider the club with the most points at the end of the season to be the champion; the NWSL honors that achievement with the NWSL Shield. Since 2024, the top eight teams in the regular-season standings earn a berth into the playoff tournament; previously, only the top four or top six teams qualified for the playoffs.

== History ==
The first NWSL Championship was held at Sahlen's Stadium in Rochester, New York, on August 31, 2013. Tobin Heath and Christine Sinclair helped lead Portland Thorns FC to a 2–0 victory over NWSL Shield winners Western New York Flash. Seattle Reign FC won the Shield the following two seasons and appeared in both championship games, losing each time to FC Kansas City. The North Carolina Courage became the first team to win the Shield and Championship in the same season, doing so in both 2018 and 2019.

The 2023 NWSL Championship set an attendance record for the league final with 25,011 at Snapdragon Stadium in San Diego, California; in the retirement game of two legends of the sport, Megan Rapinoe's Reign lost 2–1 to Ali Krieger's NJ/NY Gotham FC. The 2024 championship game was the most-watched game in NWSL history, drawing 967,900 viewers on CBS as the Orlando Pride defeated the Washington Spirit 1–0.

== Finals ==
Key
†	Match went to extra time
‡	Match decided by a penalty shootout after extra time
§	Team also won the NWSL Shield

NWSL Championships
Date	Winners	Score	Runners-up	Venue	Attendance	U.S. TV broadcasters	U.S. TV viewership	Ref.
August 31, 2013	Portland Thorns FC	2–0	Western New York Flash §	Sahlen's Stadium, Rochester, New York	9,129	Fox Sports 2		
August 31, 2014	FC Kansas City	2–1	Seattle Reign FC §	Starfire Sports Stadium, Tukwila, Washington	4,252	ESPN2	156,000	
October 1, 2015	FC Kansas City	1–0	Seattle Reign FC §	Providence Park, Portland, Oregon	13,264	Fox Sports 1	167,000	
October 9, 2016	Western New York Flash	2–2 ‡ (3–2 p)	Washington Spirit	BBVA Compass Stadium, Houston, Texas	8,255	Fox Sports 1	180,000	
October 14, 2017	Portland Thorns FC	1–0	North Carolina Courage §	Orlando City Stadium, Orlando, Florida	8,124	Lifetime	132,000	
September 22, 2018	North Carolina Courage §	3–0	Portland Thorns FC	Providence Park, Portland, Oregon	21,144	Lifetime		
October 27, 2019	North Carolina Courage §	4–0	Chicago Red Stars (Note: Chicago Stars FC was previously known as Chicago Red Stars.)	Sahlen's Stadium at WakeMed Soccer Park, Cary, North Carolina	10,227	ESPN2	166,000	
November 20, 2021	Washington Spirit	2–1 †	Chicago Red Stars	Lynn Family Stadium, Louisville, Kentucky	10,360	CBS	525,000	
October 29, 2022	Portland Thorns FC	2–0	Kansas City Current	Audi Field, Washington, D.C.	17,624	CBS	915,000	
November 11, 2023	NJ/NY Gotham FC (Note: Gotham FC was previously known as NJ/NY Gotham FC.)	2–1	OL Reign (Note: Seattle Reign FC was previously known as Reign FC and OL Reign.)	Snapdragon Stadium, San Diego, California	25,011	CBS	817,000	
November 23, 2024	Orlando Pride §	1–0	Washington Spirit	CPKC Stadium, Kansas City, Missouri	11,500	CBS	967,900	
November 22, 2025	Gotham FC	1–0	Washington Spirit	PayPal Park, San Jose, California	18,000	CBS	1,184,000	
November 21, 2026	Kansas City Current	2–1	Washington Spirit	Audi Field, Washington, D.C.	19,365	CBS		

== Results by team ==
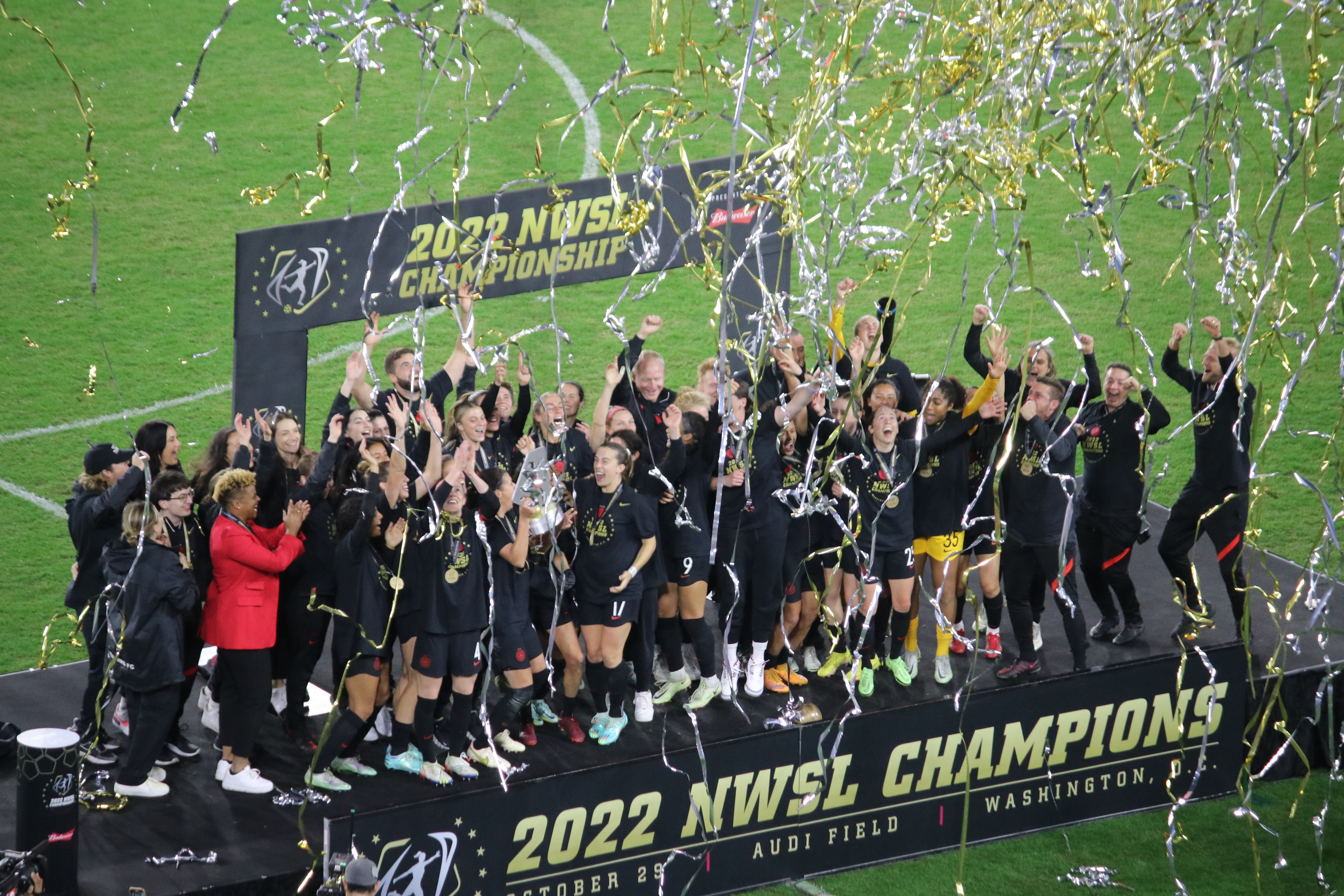
Portland Thorns FC celebrate winning the 2022 NWSL Championship.

As of 2024, 10 of the 17 teams that have played in the league have appeared in an NWSL Championship, and 7 have won a championship. Portland Thorns FC has won the NWSL Championship the most times, with three championships in four appearances.

NWSL Championship appearances by team
Club	Won	Runner-up	Years won	Years runner-up
Portland Thorns FC	3	1	2013, 2017, 2022	2018
North Carolina Courage	2	1	2018, 2019	2017
FC Kansas City	2	0	2014, 2015	
Gotham FC	2	0	2023, 2025	
Washington Spirit	1	4	2021	2016, 2024, 2025, 2026
Western New York Flash	1	1	2016	2013
Kansas City Current	1	1	2026	2022
Orlando Pride	1	0	2024	
Seattle Reign FC	0	3		2014, 2015, 2023
Chicago Stars FC	0	2		2019, 2021

== Trophy ==
The first NWSL Championship trophy, used from 2013 to 2022, was a five-sided piece of silver metal that depicted the league's logo—a silhouette of a woman kicking a soccer ball; the golden soccer ball was cutout from the silver shape. The trophy was described as "spatula-like". It was replaced in 2023 by a new trophy designed by Tiffany & Co. for the league as part of a sponsorship agreement. The second trophy, made of 24-karat gold and sterling silver, depicts a soccer ball atop a vertical base between two curved handles, similar to the FIFA Women's World Cup trophy.

== See also ==
- NWSL Championship Most Valuable Player
- NWSL records and statistics
