= 2023 North Carolina Courage season =

North Carolina Courage
2023 season
- Managing Owner: Steve Malik
- Club President: Francie Gottsegen
- Head Coach: Sean Nahas
- Stadium: WakeMed Soccer Park; Cary, North Carolina (Capacity: 10,000)
- NWSL Regular Season: 3rd
- NWSL Challenge Cup: Champions (2nd title)
- Playoffs: Quarterfinals
- Top goalscorer: Kerolin (9 goals)
- Highest home attendance: 7,070 (May 6 vs POR)
- Lowest home attendance: 4,014 (Jun 17 vs ORL)
- Average home league attendance: 4,800
Home colors	Away colors
- All statistics correct as of July 9, 2023.

The 2023 North Carolina Courage season was the team's seventh season as a professional women's soccer team. The Courage played in the National Women's Soccer League (NWSL), the top tier of women's soccer in the United States.

== Broadcasting ==
On June 5, 2023, the Courage announced that Bally Sports South would regionally broadcast eight of the team's games.

== Team ==
=== Current squad ===
As of July 17, 2023.

No.	Pos.	Nation	Player
0	GK	USA	Katelyn Rowland
1	GK	USA	Casey Murphy
2	DF	USA	Sarah Clark
3	DF	USA	Kaleigh Kurtz
4	MF	USA	Emily Gray
5	FW	USA	Haley Hopkins
6	MF	JPN	Narumi Miura
7	DF	USA	Malia Berkely
8	MF	USA	Brianna Pinto
9	FW	BRA	Kerolin
10	MF	IRL	Denise O'Sullivan
11	FW	USA	Brittany Ratcliffe
12	DF	USA	Emily Fox
13	DF	USA	Ryan Williams
14	FW	USA	Tyler Lussi
17	FW	DEN	Rikke Madsen
18	DF	CAN	Sydney Collins
19	MF	USA	Frankie Tagliaferri
20	FW	USA	Olivia Wingate
21	DF	USA	Nikia Smith
22	FW	DEN	Mille Gejl
23	DF	USA	Kiki Pickett
24	DF	CMR	Estelle Johnson
25	MF	USA	Meredith Speck
26	MF	USA	Clara Robbins
28	FW	USA	Tess Boade
29	FW	ENG	Millie Farrow
44	GK	USA	Marisa Bova
55	GK	USA	Hensley Hancuff
99	MF	CAN	Victoria Pickett
—	MF	JPN	Rikako Kobayashi

=== Staff ===
As of April 29, 2023.

Executive
Chairman	Steve Malik
President	Francie Gottsegen
Chief soccer officer	Curt Johnson
Assistant general manager	Bobby Hammond
Coaching
Head coach	(United States) Sean Nahas
Assistant coach	(England) Nathan Thackeray
Assistant coach	(England) Emma Thomson

== Regular season ==
=== Matches ===
March 25, 2023 1	North Carolina Courage	1–0	Kansas City Current	Cary, North Carolina
2:00 pm EDT	Gejl 23'	Report		Stadium: WakeMed Soccer Park; Attendance: 4,948; Referee: Alex Billeter

April 1, 2023 2	San Diego Wave FC	3–1	North Carolina Courage	San Diego, California
8:00 pm EDT	Shaw 39'; Morgan 48', 73' (pen.)	Report	Kerolin 77' (pen.)	Stadium: Snapdragon Stadium; Attendance: 17,000; Referee: John Griggs

April 15, 2023 3	North Carolina Courage	1–2	Washington Spirit	Cary, North Carolina
7:00 pm EDT	Nicoli 43' (pen.)	Report	Rodman 9'; Hatch 50' (pen.)	Stadium: WakeMed Soccer Park; Attendance: 5,160; Referee: Adorae Monroy

April 22, 2023 4	NJ/NY Gotham FC	1–0	North Carolina Courage	Harrison, New Jersey
7:30 pm EDT	Long (yellow card) 5'; Williams 80'	Report		Stadium: Red Bull Arena; Attendance: 3,200; Referee: Matthew Thompson

April 28, 2023 5	Houston Dash	0–1	North Carolina Courage	Houston, Texas
7:30 pm CDT		Report	Lussi 33' (Fox)	Stadium: Shell Energy Stadium; Referee: Thomas Snyder
Note: Match abandoned at 56' due to weather, result awarded to the Courage

May 6, 2023 6	North Carolina Courage	3–3	Portland Thorns FC	Cary, North Carolina
7:00 pm EDT	Menges 1' (o.g.); Kerolin 26' (Williams); V. Pickett 70' (Wingate)	Report	Dunn 22' (Smith), 52' (Klingenberg); Kuikka (yellow card) 54'; Moultrie 83' (Kuikka); Smith (yellow card) 90'	Stadium: WakeMed Soccer Park; Attendance: 7,070; Referee: Alyssa Nichols

May 14, 2023 7	North Carolina Courage	1–0	OL Reign	Cary, North Carolina
3:00 pm EDT	Lussi 34' (Madsen); Williams (yellow card) 83'	Report	Huerta (yellow card) 42'; Rapinoe (yellow card) 75'	Stadium: WakeMed Soccer Park; Attendance: 4,059; Referee: Alex Billeter

May 20, 2023 8	North Carolina Courage	0–0	Angel City FC	Cary, North Carolina
7:00 pm EDT	O'Sullivan (yellow card) 68'	Report		Stadium: WakeMed Soccer Park; Attendance: 4,723; Referee: Sergii Demianchuk

May 27, 2023 9	Racing Louisville FC	1–2	North Carolina Courage	Louisville, Kentucky
8:00 pm EDT	DeMelo (yellow card) 44'; Borges (yellow card) 73'; Baggett 88'	Report	Madsen 53'; Kerolin 60'; Gejl (yellow card) 77'; O'Sullivan (yellow card) 81'	Stadium: Lynn Family Stadium; Attendance: 5,874; Referee: Danielle Chesky

June 3, 2023 10	Kansas City Current	1–0	North Carolina Courage	Kansas City, Kansas
6:30 pm CDT	Hamilton 8' (Debinha); Mace (yellow card) 90+1'	Report	Kerolin (yellow card) 68'; Speck (yellow card) 75'; Pinto (yellow card) 88'	Stadium: Children's Mercy Park; Attendance: 10,294; Referee: JC Griggs

June 10, 2023 11	Chicago Red Stars	0–5	North Carolina Courage	Bridgeview, Illinois
6:00 pm CDT	Bike (yellow card) 76'; Milazzo (yellow card) 90+7'	Report	Kerolin 11', 34', 60'; Gejl 31'; O'Sullivan 52'	Stadium: SeatGeek Stadium; Attendance: 3,541; Referee: Karen Callado

June 17, 2023 12	North Carolina Courage	3–0	Orlando Pride	Cary, North Carolina
7:00 pm EDT	Kerolin 32'; Speck 77'; McCutcheon 83' (o.g.)	Report	Doyle (yellow card) 33'	Stadium: WakeMed Soccer Park; Attendance: 4,014; Referee: Calin Radosav

June 24, 2023 13	North Carolina Courage	1–0	Racing Louisville FC	Cary, North Carolina
7:00 pm EDT	Lussi 73'; Kerolin (yellow card) 90+3'	Report	Kgatlana (yellow card) 46'; Howell (yellow card) 56'; Monaghan (yellow card) 81'	Stadium: WakeMed Soccer Park; Attendance: 4,041; Referee: Elton Garcia

July 1, 2023 14	North Carolina Courage	1–0	Houston Dash	Cary, North Carolina
8:30 pm EDT	Lussi 59'	Report	Dydasco (yellow card) 45+3'; Anderson (yellow card) 81'; Olivieri (yellow card) 90+2'	Stadium: WakeMed Soccer Park; Attendance: 4,387; Referee: Rebecca Pagan
Note: Kickoff delayed from 7:30 pm by thunderstorms in the area.

July 9, 2023 15	Angel City FC	2–1	North Carolina Courage	Los Angeles, California
5:00 pm PDT	McCaskill 18'; Kurtz 77' (o.g.)	Report	Pinto 15'; Williams (yellow card) 55'	Stadium: BMO Stadium; Attendance: 17,876; Referee: Jeremy Scheer

August 20, 2023 16	Portland Thorns FC	2–1	North Carolina Courage	Portland, Oregon
7:30 pm PDT	Hubly (red card) 17'; Betfort 41'; Smith 69'	Report	Lussi 19'	Stadium: Providence Park; Attendance: 22,107; Referee: Matthew Thompson

August 27, 2023 17	North Carolina Courage	1–1	Chicago Red Stars	Cary, North Carolina
2:00 pm EDT	Boade 14'; Fox (red card) 21'; O'Sullivan (yellow card) 27'	Report	Roccaro (yellow card) 4'; Nagasato (yellow card) 44'; Milazzo 63'	Stadium: WakeMed Soccer Park; Attendance: 4,000; Referee: Kevin Broadley

September 2, 2023 18	North Carolina Courage	3–3	NJ/NY Gotham FC	Cary, North Carolina
7:00 pm EDT	Miura 19'; Kerolin (yellow card) 40', (goal) 45'; Hopkins 68'; Lussi (yellow card) 85'	Report	Nighswonger 64'; López 73'; Purce (yellow card) 75', (goal) 82'	Stadium: WakeMed Soccer Park; Attendance: 6,389; Referee: Abdou Ndiaye

September 17, 2023 19	Orlando Pride	2-1	North Carolina Courage	Orlando, Florida
7:00 pm EDT	Watt 1' Adriana 32'	Report	Matsukbo 52' Berkely (red card) 78'	Stadium: Exploria Stadium; Attendance: 5,907; Referee: Danielle Chesky

October 1, 2023 20	OL Reign	1-1	North Carolina Courage	Seattle, Washington
5:00 pm PDT	Balcer 21'; Cook (red card) 45+7'; Stanton (yellow card) 67'; Huitema (yellow card) 90+2'	Report	Kerolin 43'; Matsukubo (yellow card) 90'	Stadium: Lumen Field; Attendance: 10,345; Referee: Elton Garcia

October 7, 2023 21	North Carolina Courage	0–0	San Diego Wave FC	Cary, North Carolina
7:00 pm EDT	Kurtz (yellow card) 67'	Report	Pogarch (yellow card) 61'; Riehl (yellow card) 79'; Kornieck (yellow card) 89'	Stadium: WakeMed Soccer Park; Attendance: 10,434; Referee: Anya Voigt

October 15, 2023 22	Washington Spirit	0-1	North Carolina Courage	Washington, D.C.
5:00 pm EDT	Rodman (red card) 23'	Report	Lussi 7'	Stadium: Audi Field; Attendance: 15,479; Referee: Ricardo Fierro

=== League table ===
Pos	Team	Pld	W	D	L	GF	GA	GD	Pts	Qualification
1	San Diego Wave FC (S)	22	11	4	7	31	22	+9	37	NWSL Shield, Playoff semifinals, and CONCACAF W Champions Cup
2	Portland Thorns FC	22	10	5	7	42	32	+10	35	Playoff semifinals and W Champions Cup
3	North Carolina Courage	22	9	6	7	29	22	+7	33	Playoff quarterfinals
4	OL Reign	22	9	5	8	29	24	+5	32	Playoff quarterfinals
5	Angel City FC	22	8	7	7	31	30	+1	31	Playoff quarterfinals

Source: NWSL
Rules for classification: Tiebreakers
(S) NWSL Shield

=== Results summary ===
Overall								Home						Away					
Pld	W	D	L	GF	GA	GD	Pts	W	D	L	GF	GA	GD	W	D	L	GF	GA	GD
22	9	6	7	29	22	+7	33	5	5	1	15	9	+6	4	1	6	14	13	+1

Last updated: October 15, 2023.
Source: NWSLsoccer.com

==== Results by matchday ====
Matchday	1	2	3	4	5	6	7	8	9	10	11	12	13	14	15	16	17	18	19	20	21	22
Stadium	H	A	H	A	A	H	H	H	A	A	A	H	H	H	A	A	H	H	A	A	H	A
Result	W	L	L	L	W	D	W	D	W	L	W	W	W	W	L	L	D	D	L	D	D	W
Position	4	8	10	10	8	7	6	6	6	7	6	3	2	1	1	2	2	3	4	4	3	3

Updated to match(es) played on October 15, 2023. Source: NWSL
A = Away; H = Home; W = Win; D = Draw; L = Loss

=== Playoffs ===
October 22, 2023 First round	North Carolina Courage	0–2	NJ/NY Gotham FC	Cary, North Carolina
7:00 pm EDT		Report	Sheehan 45'; Ryan 90+1'	Stadium: WakeMed Soccer Park; Attendance: 4,612; Referee: Katja Koroleva

== Challenge Cup ==
=== Group stage ===
April 19, 2023 1	Orlando Pride	1–1	North Carolina Courage	Orlando, Florida
7:00 pm EDT	Watt 56'	Report	O'Sullivan 90+9'	Stadium: Exploria Stadium; Attendance: 3,139; Referee: Gabriele Giusti

May 3, 2023 2	North Carolina Courage	1–1	NJ/NY Gotham FC	Cary, North Carolina
7:00 pm EDT	Gejl 3'	Report	Martin (yellow card) 72'; Williams 74'	Stadium: WakeMed Soccer Park; Attendance: 2,761; Referee: Joshua Encarnación

June 14, 2023 3	Washington Spirit	1–2	North Carolina Courage	Washington, D.C.
7:30 pm EDT	McKeown 54'; Biegalski (yellow card) 70'	Report	Ratcliffe 62'; Wingate 90+2'	Stadium: Audi Field; Attendance: 5,778; Referee: Matthew Corrigan

July 22, 2023 4	North Carolina Courage	6–0	Washington Spirit	Cary, North Carolina
7:00 pm EDT	Ratcliffe 61'; Tagliaferri 65'; Wingate 70'; Boade 72'; Pinto 80'; Hopkins (yellow card) 82'; Miura 83'	Report	Jaurena (yellow card) 26'; Staab (yellow card) 63'; Metayer (yellow card) 87'	Stadium: WakeMed Soccer Park; Attendance: 4,063; Referee: Thomas Snyder

July 29, 2023 5	North Carolina Courage	5–0	Orlando Pride	Cary, North Carolina
7:00 pm EDT	Ratcliffe 17'; Berkely 38'; Tagliaferri 48'; Pinto (yellow card) 65'; Hopkins 78', 89'	Report	Yates (yellow card) 68'	Stadium: WakeMed Soccer Park; Attendance: 3,543; Referee: Greg Dopka

August 5, 2023 6	NJ/NY Gotham FC	2–0	North Carolina Courage	Harrison, New Jersey
7:30 pm EDT	Stengel 16'; Zerboni 59', (yellow card) 80'	Report	Ratcliffe (yellow card) 36'; Pickett (yellow card) 49'	Stadium: Red Bull Arena; Attendance: 3,004; Referee: Elvis Osmanovic

==== Divisional standings ====
Pos	Team	Pld	W	T	L	GF	GA	GD	Pts	Qualification	NC	NJY	WAS	ORL
1	North Carolina Courage	6	3	2	1	15	5	+10	11	Advance to knockout stage	—	1–1	6–0	0–0
2	NJ/NY Gotham FC	6	3	2	1	10	7	+3	11		2–0	—	1–0	1–1
3	Washington Spirit	6	3	0	3	10	13	−3	9		1–2	4–2	—	4–2
4	Orlando Pride	6	0	2	4	5	15	−10	2		1–1	1–3	0–1	—

Source: NWSL

==== Results summary ====
Overall								Home						Away					
Pld	W	D	L	GF	GA	GD	Pts	W	D	L	GF	GA	GD	W	D	L	GF	GA	GD
6	3	2	1	15	5	+10	11	2	1	0	12	1	+11	1	1	1	3	4	−1

Last updated: October 26, 2023.
Source: NWSLsoccer.com

==== Results by matchday ====
Matchday	1	2	3	4	5	6
Stadium	A	H	A	H	H	A
Result	D	D	W	W	W	L
Position	2	3				1

Updated to match(es) played on June 14, 2023. Source: NWSL
A = Away; H = Home; W = Win; D = Draw; L = Loss

=== Knockout stage ===
September 6, 2023 Semifinal	Kansas City Current	0–1	North Carolina Courage	Kansas City, Kansas
		Report	Kurtz (yellow card) 38'; Miura (yellow card) 51'; Boade (yellow card) 78'; Pinto (yellow card) 84', (goal) 90+6'	Stadium: Children's Mercy Park; Attendance: 4,590

=== Championship ===
September 9, 2023 Championship	North Carolina Courage	2–0	Racing Louisville FC	Cary, North Carolina
12:30 pm EDT	Kerolin 28'; Kurtz (yellow card) 45'; Matsukubo 54'	Report	DeMelo (yellow card) 73'	Stadium: WakeMed Soccer Park; Referee: Alex Billeter; MVP: Manaka Matsukubo

== Transactions ==
=== 2023 NWSL Draft ===
Draft picks are not automatically signed to the team roster. The 2023 NWSL Draft was held on January 12, 2023.

R	P	Nat.	Player	Pos.	College	Status	Ref.
1	6	(United States)	Olivia Wingate	FW	Notre Dame	Signed through 2025.	
1	8	(Canada)	Sydney Collins	MF	California	Signed through 2025.	
1	9	(United States)	Clara Robbins	MF	Florida State	Signed through 2025.	
1	11	(United States)	Haley Hopkins	FW	Virginia	Signed through 2025.	

=== Contract options ===
Date	Nat.	Player	Pos.	Notes	Ref.
November 15, 2022	(United States)	Marisa Bova	GK	Option exercised.	
November 15, 2022	(United States)	Kaleigh Kurtz	DF	Option exercised.	
November 15, 2022	(United States)	Tess Boade	MF	Option exercised.	
November 15, 2022	(United States)	Emily Gray	MF	Option exercised.	
November 15, 2022	(Japan)	Fuka Nagano	MF	Option exercised.	
November 15, 2022	(United States)	Frankie Tagliaferri	MF	Option exercised.	
November 15, 2022	(Mexico)	Diana Ordóñez	FW	Option exercised.	
November 15, 2022	(United States)	Jaelene Daniels	DF	Option declined.	

=== Re-signings ===
Date	Nat.	Player	Pos.	Notes	Ref.
November 28, 2022	(United States)	Kaleigh Kurtz	DF	Re-signed through 2025 on a guaranteed contract.	
December 6, 2022	(United States)	Meredith Speck	MF	Free agent re-signed through 2024 on a guaranteed contract.	
January 3, 2023	(United States)	Casey Murphy	GK	Re-signed through 2025 on a guaranteed contract.	
January 5, 2023	(United States)	Brianna Pinto	MF	Re-signed through 2025 on a guaranteed contract.	
January 19, 2023	(United States)	Ryan Williams	DF	Re-signed through 2025.	
January 23, 2023	(United States)	Brittany Ratcliffe	FW	Free agent re-signed through 2023, with a mutual option to extend through 2024.	
January 24, 2023	(United States)	Katelyn Rowland	GK	Free agent re-signed through 2025.	

=== Loans in ===
Date	Nat.	Player	Pos.	Previous club	Fee/notes	Ref.
July 27, 2023	(Japan)	Manaka Matsukubo	MF	(Japan) MyNavi Sendai	Loaned until June 2024. Courage have option to transfer playing rights to the club on a permanent basis following the loan period.	

=== Loans out ===
Date	Nat.	Player	Pos.	Destination club	Fee/notes	Ref.
November 15, 2022	(United States)	Tess Boade	MF	(Australia) Western Sydney Wanderers	Loaned until February 2023. Returned December 17, 2022, due to injury.	
August 15, 2023	(United States)	Hensley Hancuff	GK	(Sweden) Växjö DFF	Loan runs through the 2023-24 Damallsvenskan season.	

=== Transfers in ===
Date	Nat.	Player	Pos.	Previous club	Fee/notes	Ref.
December 1, 2022	(Cameroon)	Estelle Johnson	DF	(United States) NJ/NY Gotham FC	Free-agent signed through 2024 on a guaranteed contract.	
January 20, 2023	(United States)	Tyler Lussi	FW	(United States) Angel City FC	Acquired in exchange for Merritt Mathias.	
January 20, 2023	(Denmark)	Mille Gejl	FW	(Sweden) BK Häcken FF	Signed through 2024.	
January 23, 2023	(United States)	Emily Fox	DF	(United States) Racing Louisville FC	Acquired in exchange for Abby Erceg and Carson Pickett.	
February 7, 2023	(Japan)	Narumi Miura	MF	(Japan) Tokyo Verdy Beleza	Acquired for an undisclosed transfer fee. Under contract through 2024.	
April 7, 2022	(Canada)	Victoria Pickett	MF	(United States) NJ/NY Gotham FC	Acquired in exchange for $200,000 in allocation money.	
June 27, 2023	(United States)	Hensley Hancuff	GK	(Australia) Brisbane Roar FC	Short-term national team replacement player signing.	
June 27, 2023	(United States)	Sarah Clark	DF	(United States) Virginia Cavaliers	Short-term national team replacement player signing.	
June 27, 2023	(United States)	Nikia Smith	DF	(Israel) F.C. Ramat HaSharon	Short-term national team replacement player signing.	
July 17, 2023	(Japan)	Rikako Kobayashi	MF	(Japan) Tokyo Verdy Beleza	Free transfer signed to a two-year contract with an option for an additional year.	

=== Transfers out ===
Date	Nat.	Player	Pos.	Destination club	Fee/notes	Ref.
November 15, 2022	(United States)	Rylee Baisden	FW	(Australia) Perth Glory	Contract mutually terminated.	
November 15, 2022	(New Zealand)	Katie Bowen	DF	(Australia) Melbourne City	Contract mutually terminated.	
December 18, 2022	(Mexico)	Diana Ordóñez	FW	(United States) Houston Dash	Traded with the 30th-overall selection of the 2023 NWSL Draft in exchange for the eighth-overall selection in the 2023 NWSL Draft, Houston's natural first-round selection in the 2024 NWSL Draft, a 2023 international slot, and $100,000 in allocation money.	
December 22, 2022	(Brazil)	Debinha	MF	(United States) Kansas City Current	Free-agent signing.	
January 14, 2023	(Japan)	Fuka Nagano	MF	(England) Liverpool F.C.	Transfer terms not disclosed.	
January 20, 2023	(United States)	Merritt Mathias	DF	(United States) Angel City FC	Traded in exchange for Tyler Lussi.	
January 23, 2023	(New Zealand)	Abby Erceg	DF	(United States) Racing Louisville FC	Traded in exchange for Emily Fox.	
January 23, 2023	(United States)	Carson Pickett	DF	(United States) Racing Louisville FC	Traded in exchange for Emily Fox.	

=== Injury listings ===
Date	Nat.	Player	Pos.	List	Injury	Ref.
March 20, 2023	(United States)	Tess Boade	MF	45-day injured reserve	Shoulder injury suffered while on loan to Western Sydney Wanderers.	
March 20, 2023	(United States)	Emily Gray	MF	Season-ending injury	Anterior cruciate ligament tear during preseason.	

=== Preseason trialists ===
Trialists are non-rostered invitees during preseason and are not automatically signed. The Courage released their preseason roster on February 3, 2023.

Nat.	Player	Pos.	Previous club	Notes	Ref.
(Israel)	Elianna Beard	MF	(Israel) F.C. Kiryat Gat	Not signed.	
(United States)	Sarah Clark	DF	(United States) Virginia Cavaliers	Signed as a national team replacement player.	
(Ghana)	Jennifer Cudjoe	MF	(United States) NJ/NY Gotham FC	Not signed.	
(United States)	Nikia Smith	DF	(Israel) F.C. Ramat HaSharon	Signed as a national team replacement player.	
(United States)	Croix Soto	DF	(United States) Oregon Ducks	Not signed.	
