= 2024 North Carolina Courage season =

Professional women's soccer club season

North Carolina Courage
2024 season
- Managing Owner: Steve Malik
- Club President: Francie Gottsegen
- Head Coach: Sean Nahas
- Stadium: WakeMed Soccer Park; Cary, North Carolina (Capacity: 10,000)
- NWSL Regular Season: 5th
- NWSL x Liga MX Femenil Summer Cup: Semifinals
- Playoffs: Quarterfinals
- Top goalscorer: Ashley Sanchez (5)
- Highest home attendance: 10,026 (Nov 2 vs WAS)
- Lowest home attendance: 4,528 (May 17 vs UTA)
- Average home league attendance: 6,363
Home colors	Away colors
- All statistics correct as of November 9, 2024.

The 2024 North Carolina Courage season was the team's eighth season as a professional women's soccer team. The Courage played in the National Women's Soccer League (NWSL), the top tier of women's soccer in the United States. They finished the regular season in fifth place and qualified for the playoffs, where they were eliminated in the quarterfinals by the fourth-seeded Kansas City Current.

== Background ==
In the 2023 National Women's Soccer League season, the Courage were on top of the league standings in July but finished the season in 3rd place, then fell in the first round of the NWSL playoffs to eventual champions NJ/NY Gotham FC. Forward Kerolin scored 10 goals and was named the NWSL MVP. The Courage won the NWSL Challenge Cup for the second year in a row.

== Team ==
=== Squad ===
As of August 21, 2024.

No.	Pos.	Nation	Player
1	GK	USA	Casey Murphy
2	FW	USA	Ashley Sanchez
3	DF	USA	Kaleigh Kurtz
5	FW	USA	Haley Hopkins
6	MF	JPN	Narumi Miura
7	DF	USA	Malia Berkely
8	MF	USA	Brianna Pinto
9	FW	BRA	Kerolin
10	MF	IRL	Denise O'Sullivan (captain)
11	DF	GER	Felicitas Rauch
13	DF	USA	Ryan Williams
14	FW	USA	Tyler Lussi
16	MF	USA	Riley Jackson
17	MF	USA	Dani Weatherholt
18	DF	CAN	Sydney Collins
19	MF	USA	Landy Mertz
20	FW	USA	Olivia Wingate
22	FW	AUS	Cortnee Vine
23	FW	CAN	Bianca St-Georges
24	DF	CMR	Estelle Johnson
25	MF	USA	Meredith Speck
27	DF	USA	Maycee Bell
33	DF	AUS	Charlotte McLean
34	MF	JPN	Manaka Matsukubo
44	GK	USA	Marisa Bova
51	GK	USA	Hensley Hancuff
77	FW	BRA	Aline Gomes
94	MF	CAN	Victoria Pickett

=== Staff ===
As of April 29, 2023.

Executive
Chairman	Steve Malik
President	Francie Gottsegen
Chief soccer officer	Curt Johnson
Assistant general manager	Bobby Hammond
Coaching
Head coach	(United States) Sean Nahas
Assistant coach	(England) Nathan Thackeray
Assistant coach	(England) Emma Thomson

== Regular season ==
=== Matches ===
March 16, 2024 1	North Carolina Courage	5–1	Houston Dash	Cary, North Carolina
7:00 p.m. EDT (UTC-5)	Berkely 19' (pen.); O'Sullivan (yellow card) 45'; Hopkins 54'; St-Georges 77', 86'; Weatherholt 90+9'	Report	Schmidt (yellow card) 37'; Kurtz 65' (o.g.)	Stadium: WakeMed Soccer Park; Attendance: 5,878; Referee: Anya Voigt

March 22, 2024 2	Utah Royals	2–1	North Carolina Courage	Sandy, Utah
7:30 p.m. MDT (UTC-6)	Del Fava 15'; Foederer (yellow card) 17'; Sentnor 30'; Betfort (yellow card) 49'; Cluff (yellow card) 90+2'; Haught (yellow card) 90+7'	Report	Sanchez 26'	Stadium: America First Field; Attendance: 8,161; Referee: Elijio Arreguin

March 30, 2024 3	North Carolina Courage	1–0	NJ/NY Gotham FC	Cary, North Carolina
7:00 p.m. EDT (UTC-5)	Pinto 44'; Kurtz (yellow card) 61'; St-Georges (yellow card) 62'	Report	Dunn (yellow card) 54'; Torres (yellow card) 90+7'	Stadium: WakeMed Soccer Park; Attendance: 5,281; Referee: Elton Garcia

April 13, 2024 4	North Carolina Courage	2–0	Portland Thorns FC	Cary, North Carolina
7:00 p.m. EDT (UTC-5)	Lussi 5'; Hopkins 35'	Report	Sugita (yellow card) 71'; Hubly (yellow card) 81'	Stadium: WakeMed Soccer Park; Attendance: 5,711; Referee: Matthew Thompson

April 21, 2024 5	Angel City FC	2–1	North Carolina Courage	Los Angeles, California
4:30 p.m. PDT (UTC-7)	Emslie 23', 54'; Curry (yellow card) 59'; Bright (yellow card) 68'	Report	Kurtz (yellow card) 22'; Lussi 73'	Stadium: BMO Stadium; Attendance: 22,000; Referee: Alexis Da Silva

April 27, 2024 6	North Carolina Courage	1–0	Seattle Reign FC	Cary, North Carolina
7:00 p.m. EDT (UTC-5)	Lussi 37'; Murphy (yellow card) 67'	Report		Stadium: WakeMed Soccer Park; Attendance: 8,135; Referee: Gerald Flores

May 1, 2024 7	Orlando Pride	4–1	North Carolina Courage	Orlando, Florida
7:00 p.m. EDT (UTC-5)	Watt 29'; Banda 40', 77'; Doyle 45+2'	Report	Sams 52' (o.g.); Pickett (yellow card) 59'	Stadium: Inter&Co Stadium; Attendance: 4,702; Referee: Natalie Simon

May 4, 2024 8	NJ/NY Gotham FC	1–0	North Carolina Courage	Harrison, New Jersey
7:30 p.m. EDT (UTC-5)	Williams 11'; Ryan (yellow card) 53'	Report	St-Georges (yellow card) 21'	Stadium: Red Bull Arena; Attendance: 6,184; Referee: Jeremy Scheer

May 12, 2024 9	Kansas City Current	1–0	North Carolina Courage	Kansas City, Missouri
5:00 p.m. CDT (UTC-5)	DiBernardo (yellow card) 51'; Debinha 52'	Report	Rauch (yellow card) 90'	Stadium: CPKC Stadium; Attendance: 11,500; Referee: Adam Kilpatrick

May 17, 2024 10	North Carolina Courage	1–0	Utah Royals	Cary, North Carolina
8:00 p.m. EDT (UTC-5)	Kurtz 76'	Report	Nyberg (yellow card) 17'; Henry (yellow card) 86'	Stadium: WakeMed Soccer Park; Attendance: 4,528; Referee: Alex Billeter

May 24, 2024 11	Houston Dash	3–0	North Carolina Courage	Houston, Texas
7:00 p.m. CDT (UTC-5)	Bachmann 44' (yellow card) 58'; Olivieri 68'; Ordóñez 78'	Report	Hopkins (yellow card) 43'; Miura (yellow card) 68'	Stadium: Shell Energy Stadium; Attendance: 4,732

June 8, 2024 12	Portland Thorns FC	1–0	North Carolina Courage	Portland, Oregon
7:00 p.m. PDT (UTC-7)	Smith 79' (pen.) (yellow card) 89' (yellow-red card) 90+11'	Report	Williams (yellow card) 26' (yellow-red card) 78'; O'Sullivan (yellow card) 66'; Miura (yellow card) 90+12'	Stadium: Providence Park; Attendance: 21,025; Referee: Danielle Chesky

June 15, 2024 13	North Carolina Courage	0–0	Orlando Pride	Cary, North Carolina
7:30 p.m. EDT (UTC-5)	Lussi (yellow card) 16'; Kurtz (yellow card) 49'	Report	Watt (yellow card) 86'	Stadium: WakeMed Soccer Park; Attendance: 4,776; Referee: John C. Griggs

June 23, 2024 14	North Carolina Courage	3–1	Chicago Red Stars	Cary, North Carolina
6:00 p.m. EDT (UTC-5)	Lussi 16'; Sanchez 51'; Miura (yellow card) 66'; Speck 81'; O'Sullivan (yellow card) 84'; St-Georges (yellow card) 90+8'	Report	Swanson 12'; Roccaro (yellow card) 90+3'	Stadium: WakeMed Soccer Park; Attendance: 5,256; Referee: Laura Rodriguez

June 29, 2024 15	Washington Spirit	0–1	North Carolina Courage	Washington, D.C.
7:30 p.m. EDT (UTC-5)	Hershfelt (yellow card) 80'	Report	Sanchez 19'; Speck (yellow card) 75'	Stadium: Audi Field; Attendance: 15,717; Referee: Rebecca Pagan

July 7, 2024 16	North Carolina Courage	3–1	Racing Louisville FC	Cary, North Carolina
4:30 p.m. EDT (UTC-5)	Sanchez 55'; Matsukubo 61'; Wingate 69'; Speck (yellow card) 80'	Report	Turner 31'; Fischer (yellow card) 33'; Howell (yellow card) 35'	Stadium: WakeMed Soccer Park; Attendance: 4,738; Referee: Anya Voigt

August 25, 2024 17	Seattle Reign FC	1–0	North Carolina Courage	Seattle, Washington
7:00 p.m. PDT (UTC-7)	Murphy 90+7' (o.g.)	Report		Stadium: Lumen Field; Attendance: 16,598; Referee: Greg Dopka

September 1, 2024 18	North Carolina Courage	2–1	Kansas City Current	Cary, North Carolina
2:00 p.m. EDT (UTC-5)	Vine 67'; Kurtz (yellow card) 74'; Pinto 90+2'	Report	Chawinga 62'	Stadium: WakeMed Soccer Park; Attendance: 6,003; Referee: Elvis Osmanovic

September 8, 2024 19	San Diego Wave FC	1–4	North Carolina Courage	San Diego, California
5:00 p.m. PDT (UTC-7)	Wesley 13'; Sheridan (red card) 60'	Report	Hopkins 4'; O'Sullivan (yellow card) 8'; Rauch 20'; St-Georges 45'; Speck 90+4'	Stadium: Snapdragon Stadium; Attendance: 26,516; Referee: Brad Jensen

September 13, 2024 20	North Carolina Courage	1–1	Bay FC	Cary, North Carolina
7:00 p.m. EDT (UTC-5)	O'Sullivan (yellow card) 14'; Sanchez 28'	Report	Oshoala 19'	Stadium: WakeMed Soccer Park; Attendance: 6,837; Referee: John Griggs

September 21, 2024 21	Racing Louisville FC	2–1	North Carolina Courage	Louisville, Kentucky
7:30 p.m. EDT (UTC-5)	Petersen (yellow card) 38'; Sears 79'; Balcer 90+2' (pen.)	Report	Sanchez (yellow card) 19'; Pinto 43'; Rauch (yellow card) 78'; Miura (yellow card) 89'; Williams (yellow card) 90+7'	Stadium: Lynn Family Stadium; Attendance: 4,653; Referee: Adorae Monroy

September 29, 2024 22	Chicago Red Stars	1–3	North Carolina Courage	Bridgeview, Illinois
5:00 p.m. CDT (UTC-5)	Ludmila 68'	Report	Roccaro 15' (o.g.); O'Sullivan 42'; Kerolin 65'	Stadium: SeatGeek Stadium; Attendance: 4,317; Referee: Ricardo Fierro

October 5, 2024 23	North Carolina Courage	2–1	San Diego Wave FC	Cary, North Carolina
7:00 p.m. EDT (UTC-5)	Aline 32'; Matsukubo 45+4'	Report	Lundkvist (yellow card) 45+9' (goal) 84'	Stadium: WakeMed Soccer Park; Attendance: 8,496; Referee: Melinda Sopka

October 12, 2024 24	North Carolina Courage	1–1	Angel City FC	Cary, North Carolina
7:30 p.m. EDT (UTC-5)	Wingate 90+10'	Report	Curry (yellow card) 33'; Leroux (yellow card) 90+2'; Press 90+7'	Stadium: WakeMed Soccer Park; Attendance: 7,037; Referee: Eric Tattersall

October 19, 2024 25	Bay FC	1–0	North Carolina Courage	San Jose, California
7:00 p.m. PDT (UTC-7)	Pickett (yellow card) 61'; Dahlkemper 83'	Report	Hopkins (yellow card) 90+2'	Stadium: PayPal Park; Attendance: 14,901; Referee: Elijio Arreguin

November 2, 2024 26	North Carolina Courage	0–1	Washington Spirit	Cary, North Carolina
7:30 p.m. EDT (UTC-5)		Report	Hatch 37'	Stadium: WakeMed Soccer Park; Attendance: 10,026; Referee: Elvis Osmanovic

=== League table ===
Pos	Team	Pld	W	D	L	GF	GA	GD	Pts	Qualification
3	NJ/NY Gotham FC	26	17	5	4	41	20	+21	56	Playoffs, and CONCACAF W Champions Cup (Note: With Orlando Pride winning both the 2024 National Women's Soccer League Championship and 2024 National Women's Soccer League Shield, the third qualifying spot for the United States went to the next best club in 2024 National Women's Soccer League Shield standings not already qualified, Gotham FC.)
4	Kansas City Current	26	16	7	3	57	31	+26	55	Playoffs
5	North Carolina Courage	26	12	3	11	34	28	+6	39	Playoffs
6	Portland Thorns FC	26	10	4	12	37	35	+2	34	Playoffs
7	Bay FC	26	11	1	14	31	41	−10	34	Playoffs

Source: NWSL
Rules for classification: Tiebreakers

=== Results summary ===
Overall								Home						Away					
Pld	W	D	L	GF	GA	GD	Pts	W	D	L	GF	GA	GD	W	D	L	GF	GA	GD
26	12	3	11	34	28	+6	39	9	3	1	22	8	+14	3	0	10	12	20	−8

Last updated: November 2, 2024.
Source: NWSLsoccer.com

==== Results by matchday ====
Matchday	1	2	3	4	5	6	7	8	9	10	11	12	13	14	15	16	17	18	19	20	21	22	23	24	25	26
Stadium	H	A	H	H	A	H	A	A	A	H	A	A	H	H	A	H	A	H	A	H	A	A	H	H	A	H
Result	W	L	W	W	L	W	L	L	L	W	L	L	D	W	W	W	L	W	W	D	L	W	W	D	L	L
Position	1	3	3	2	4	2	6	6	6	7	8	7	6	6	6	6	5	5	5	5	5	5	5	5	5	5

Updated to match(es) played on November 2, 2024. Source: NWSL
A = Away; H = Home; W = Win; D = Draw; L = Loss

=== Playoffs ===
The Courage clinched the fifth position in the table and qualified for the championship playoffs, where they faced and lost to the fourth-seeded Kansas City Current.

November 9, 2024 Quarterfinals	Kansas City Current	1–0	North Carolina Courage	Kansas City, Missouri
11:00 p.m. CST (UTC-6)	Chawinga 8'; LaBonta (yellow card) 28'; Wheeler (yellow card) 90+8'	Report	O'Sullivan (yellow card) 36'; St-Georges (yellow card) 90+8'	Stadium: CPKC Stadium; Referee: Brad Jensen

== NWSL x Liga MX Femenil Summer Cup ==
The Courage finished first in Group E and were the 4th-highest ranked group winners, qualifying them to advance to the tournament semifinals, where they lost to the Kansas City Current.

=== Group stage matches ===
July 20, 2024	North Carolina Courage (United States)	1–1 (5–4 p)	(United States) Orlando Pride	Cary, North Carolina, United States
7:30 p.m.	Matsukubo 45'	Report	Jiménez 82'	Stadium: WakeMed Soccer Park; Attendance: 2,800; Referee: Lorenzo Hernandez
	Penalties
	Jackson (penalty missed); Kurtz (penalty scored); Wingate (penalty scored); Berkely (penalty scored); Pinto (penalty scored); Weatherholt (penalty missed); Miura (penalty scored)		(penalty scored) Larroquette; (penalty scored) Lemos; (penalty scored) Watt; (penalty scored) Strom; (penalty missed) Jiménez; (penalty missed) McCutcheon; (penalty missed) Duljan

July 26, 2024	Racing Louisville FC (United States)	1–1 (4–5 p)	(United States) North Carolina Courage	Louisville, United States
8:00 p.m.	Pickett 66'	Report	Jackson 90+1'	Stadium: Lynn Family Stadium; Attendance: 4,083
	Penalties
	Borges (penalty scored); DiGrande (penalty scored); Pickett (penalty scored); Turner (penalty scored); Howell (penalty missed)		(penalty scored) Jackson; (penalty scored) Kurtz; (penalty scored) Berkely; (penalty scored) Miura; (penalty scored) Lussi

July 31, 2024	North Carolina Courage (United States)	3–0	(Mexico) Monterrey	Cary, North Carolina, United States
7:00 p.m.	Sanchez 48'; Hopkins 82'; Mertz 90'	Report		Stadium: WakeMed Soccer Park; Attendance: 4,438; Referee: Danielle Chesky

==== Group stage standings ====
Pos	Team	Pld	W	PW	PL	L	GF	GA	GD	Pts	Qualification	NC	LOU	ORL	MON
1	(United States Soccer Federation) North Carolina Courage	3	1	2	0	0	5	2	+3	7	Advances to knockout stage	—	1–1	1–1	3–0
2	(United States Soccer Federation) Racing Louisville FC	3	1	1	1	0	5	3	+2	6		1–1	—	1–1	3–1
3	(United States Soccer Federation) Orlando Pride	3	0	1	2	0	4	4	0	4		1–1	1–1	—	2–2
4	(Mexican Football Federation) Monterrey	3	0	0	1	2	3	8	−5	1		0–3	1–3	2–2	—

Source: NWSL
Rules for classification: tiebreakers

==== Results summary ====
Overall								Home						Away					
Pld	W	D	L	GF	GA	GD	Pts	W	D	L	GF	GA	GD	W	D	L	GF	GA	GD
3	2	1	0	5	2	+3	7	2	0	0	4	1	+3	0	1	0	1	1	0

Last updated: August 6, 2024.
Source: NWSLsoccer.com

=== Knockout stage ===
August 6, 2024	Kansas City Current (United States)	2–0	(United States) North Carolina Courage	Kansas City, Missouri
21:00 ET	Chawinga 2'; Debinha 78'	Report		Stadium: CPKC Stadium; Referee: Katja Koroleva

== Squad statistics ==
As of Match played November 9, 2024

=== Appearances ===
Only players who have made appearances are listed. Starting appearances are listed first, followed by substitute appearances after the + symbol where applicable.

No.	Pos	Nat	Player	Total		NWSL		Playoffs		Summer Cup	
No.	Pos	Nat	Player	Apps	Goals	Apps	Goals	Apps	Goals	Apps	Goals
Goalkeepers
1	GK	(United States) USA	Casey Murphy	27	0	26	0	1	0	0	0
44	GK	(United States) USA	Marisa Bova	4	0	0	0	0	0	4	0
Defenders
3	DF	(United States) USA	Kaleigh Kurtz	31	1	26	1	1	0	4	0
7	DF	(United States) USA	Malia Berkely	30	1	25	1	1	0	4	0
11	DF	(Germany) GER	Felicitas Rauch	26	1	21+4	1	1	0	0	0
13	DF	(United States) USA	Ryan Williams	30	0	25	0	1	0	4	0
27	DF	(United States) USA	Maycee Bell	2	0	0+2	0	0	0	0	0
33	DF	(Australia) AUS	Charlotte McLean	1	0	0	0	0	0	0+1	0
Midfielders
2	MF	(United States) USA	Ashley Sanchez	31	6	25+1	5	1	0	4	1
6	MF	(Japan) JPN	Narumi Miura	30	0	23+2	0	1	0	4	0
8	MF	(United States) USA	Brianna Pinto	24	3	9+11	3	0	0	1+3	0
10	MF	(Republic of Ireland) IRL	Denise O'Sullivan	26	1	21+2	1	1	0	2	0
16	MF	(United States) USA	Riley Jackson	22	1	3+15	0	0	0	2+2	1
17	MF	(United States) USA	Dani Weatherholt	25	1	8+13	1	0	0	4	0
19	MF	(United States) USA	Landy Mertz	4	1	0+2	0	0	0	0+2	1
25	MF	(United States) USA	Meredith Speck	16	2	1+10	2	0+1	0	2+2	0
34	MF	(Japan) JPN	Manaka Matsukubo	21	3	11+6	2	1	0	1+2	1
94	MF	(Canada) CAN	Victoria Pickett	23	0	6+13	0	0	0	2+2	0
Forwards
5	FW	(United States) USA	Haley Hopkins	28	4	18+5	3	0+1	0	2+2	1
9	FW	(Brazil) BRA	Kerolin	6	1	2+3	1	1	0	0	0
14	FW	(United States) USA	Tyler Lussi	26	4	20+2	4	0	0	3+1	0
20	FW	(United States) USA	Olivia Wingate	13	2	1+9	2	0+1	0	1+1	0
22	FW	(Australia) AUS	Cortnee Vine	5	1	2+2	1	0+1	0	0	0
23	FW	(Canada) CAN	Bianca St-Georges	22	3	8+13	3	0+1	0	0	0
77	FW	(Brazil) BRA	Aline Gomes	8	1	5+2	1	1	0	0	0

=== Goals ===
Rank	No.	Pos.	Nat.	Name	NWSL	Playoffs	Summer Cup	Total
1	2	MF	(United States)	Ashley Sanchez	5	0	1	6
2	14	FW	(United States)	Tyler Lussi	4	0	0	4
3	5	FW	(United States)	Haley Hopkins	3	0	1	4
4	8	MF	(United States)	Brianna Pinto	3	0	0	3
4	23	FW	(Canada)	Bianca St-Georges	3	0	0	3
5	34	MF	(Japan)	Manaka Matsukubo	2	0	1	3
6	25	MF	(United States)	Meredith Speck	2	0	0	2
6	20	FW	(United States)	Olivia Wingate	2	0	0	2
7	7	DF	(United States)	Malia Berkely	1	0	0	1
7	77	FW	(Brazil)	Aline Gomes	1	0	0	1
7	9	FW	(Brazil)	Kerolin	1	0	0	1
7	3	DF	(United States)	Kaleigh Kurtz	1	0	0	1
7	10	MF	(Republic of Ireland)	Denise O'Sullivan	1	0	0	1
7	11	DF	(Germany)	Felicitas Rauch	1	0	0	1
7	22	FW	(Australia)	Cortnee Vine	1	0	0	1
7	17	MF	(United States)	Dani Weatherholt	1	0	0	1
8	16	MF	(United States)	Riley Jackson	0	0	1	1
8	19	MF	(United States)	Landy Mertz	0	0	1	1
Own goals					2	0	0	2
Total					34	0	5	39

=== Assists ===
Rank	No.	Pos.	Nat.	Name	NWSL	Playoffs	Summer Cup	Total
1	2	MF	(United States)	Ashley Sanchez	4	0	0	4
2	7	DF	(United States)	Malia Berkely	3	0	0	3
2	10	MF	(Republic of Ireland)	Denise O'Sullivan	3	0	0	3
3	25	MF	(United States)	Meredith Speck	1	0	2	3
4	14	FW	(United States)	Tyler Lussi	2	0	0	2
4	8	MF	(United States)	Brianna Pinto	2	0	0	2
4	20	FW	(United States)	Olivia Wingate	2	0	0	2
5	5	FW	(United States)	Haley Hopkins	1	0	1	2
6	34	MF	(Japan)	Manaka Matsukubo	1	0	0	1
6	94	MF	(Canada)	Victoria Pickett	1	0	0	1
6	23	FW	(Canada)	Bianca St-Georges	1	0	0	1
7	13	DF	(United States)	Ryan Williams	0	0	1	1
Total					21	0	4	25

=== Clean sheets ===
Rank	No.	Nat.	Name	NWSL	Playoffs	Summer Cup	Total
1	1	(United States)	Casey Murphy	6	0	0	6
2	44	(United States)	Marisa Bova	0	0	1	1
Total				6	0	1	7

=== Disciplinary record ===
No.	Pos.	Nat.	Name	NWSL			Playoffs			Summer Cup			Total		
No.	Pos.	Nat.	Name	Booked	(yellow card) (yellow-red card)	Sent off (straight red)	Booked	(yellow card) (yellow-red card)	Sent off (straight red)	Booked	(yellow card) (yellow-red card)	Sent off (straight red)	Booked	(yellow card) (yellow-red card)	Sent off (straight red)
1	GK	(United States)	Casey Murphy	1	0	0	0	0	0	0	0	0	1	0	0
2	MF	(United States)	Ashley Sanchez	1	0	0	0	0	0	0	0	0	1	0	0
3	DF	(United States)	Kaleigh Kurtz	4	0	0	0	0	0	0	0	0	4	0	0
5	FW	(United States)	Haley Hopkins	2	0	0	0	0	0	1	0	0	3	0	0
6	MF	(Japan)	Narumi Miura	3	0	0	0	0	0	0	0	0	3	0	0
10	MF	(Republic of Ireland)	Denise O'Sullivan	5	0	0	1	0	0	0	0	0	6	0	0
11	DF	(Germany)	Felicitas Rauch	2	0	0	0	0	0	0	0	0	2	0	0
13	DF	(United States)	Ryan Williams	3	1	0	0	0	0	0	0	0	3	1	0
14	FW	(United States)	Tyler Lussi	1	0	0	0	0	0	0	0	0	1	0	0
23	FW	(Canada)	Bianca St-Georges	3	0	0	1	0	0	0	0	0	4	0	0
25	MF	(United States)	Meredith Speck	2	0	0	0	0	0	0	0	0	2	0	0
94	MF	(Canada)	Victoria Pickett	1	0	0	0	0	0	0	0	0	1	0	0
Total				28	1	0	2	0	0	1	0	0	31	1	0

== Transactions ==
=== 2024 NWSL Draft ===
Draft picks are not automatically signed to the team roster. The 2024 NWSL Draft was held on January 12, 2024.

R	P	Player	Pos.	College	Status	Ref.
2	24	(United States) Talia Staude	DF	University of Virginia	Signed to a three-year contract.	
3	40	(United States) Julia Dorsey	DF	University of North Carolina	Signed to a three-year contract.	
4	52	(United States) Landy Mertz	MF	University of Pittsburgh	Signed to a three-year contract.	

=== Re-signings ===
Date	Player	Pos.	Notes	Ref.
November 17, 2023	(United States) Marisa Bova	GK	Re-signed to a two-year contract.	
December 4, 2023	(United States) Tess Boade	FW	Re-signed to a two-year contract.	
February 7, 2024	(United States) Tyler Lussi	FW	Re-signed to a two-year contract with a mutual option.	
March 5, 2024	(United States) Meredith Speck	MF	Re-signed to a one-year contract.	

=== Loans in ===
Date	Player	Pos.	Previous club	Fee/notes	Ref.
July 27, 2023	(Japan) Manaka Matsukubo	MF	(Japan) MyNavi Sendai	Loaned until June 2024. Courage have option to transfer playing rights to the club on a permanent basis following the loan period. Signed permanently on June 27, 2024.	

=== Loans out ===
Date	Player	Pos.	Destination club	Fee/notes	Ref.
August 15, 2023	(United States) Hensley Hancuff	GK	(Sweden) Växjö DFF	Loaned through the 2023-24 Damallsvenskan season. Recalled from loan on January 4, 2024.	
January 31, 2024	(Denmark) Mille Gejl	FW	(France) Montpellier HSC	Loaned through June 2024. Montpellier have option to purchase contract following the loan period.	
August 9, 2024	(United States) Julia Dorsey	DF	(United States) Dallas Trinity FC	Loaned through the remainder of the 2024 NWSL season.	
August 20, 2024	(United States) Talia Staude	DF	(United States) Tampa Bay Sun FC	Loaned through December 2024.	

=== Transfers in ===
Date	Player	Pos.	Previous club	Fee/notes	Ref.
January 8, 2024	(Canada) Bianca St-Georges	FW	(United States) Chicago Red Stars	Free agent signed to a two-year contract with a mutual option.	
January 12, 2024	(United States) Ashley Sanchez	MF	(United States) Washington Spirit	Traded in exchange for the 5th overall pick in the 2024 NWSL Draft and $250,000 in allocation money.	
January 16, 2024	(United States) Dani Weatherholt	MF	(United States) Angel City FC	Free agent signed to a two-year contract.	
January 17, 2024	(Germany) Felicitas Rauch	DF	(Germany) VfL Wolfsburg	Acquired in exchange for an undisclosed transfer fee and signed to a two-year contract.	
March 13, 2024	(United States) Maya McCutcheon	DF	(United States) West Virginia Mountaineers	Preseason trialists signed to 2024 injury replacement contracts.	
March 13, 2024	(United States) Jenna Winebrenner	DF	(United States) Kansas City Current	Preseason trialists signed to 2024 injury replacement contracts.	
June 14, 2024	(Australia) Cortnee Vine	FW	(Australia) Sydney FC	Acquired via a free transfer and signed to a three-year contract.	
June 17, 2024	(Australia) Charlotte McLean	DF	(Australia) Sydney FC	Acquired via a free transfer and signed to a two-year contract.	
June 27, 2024	(Japan) Manaka Matsukubo	MF	(Japan) MyNavi Sendai	Loanee acquired permanently for an undisclosed transfer fee and signed to a two-year contract.	
July 16, 2024	(United States) Victoria Haugen	DF	(United States) Virginia Tech Hokies	Preseason trialist signed to a national team replacement contract.	
July 30, 2024	(Brazil) Aline Gomes	FW	(Brazil) Ferroviária	Acquired in exchange for an undisclosed transfer fee and signed to a three-year contract with an option.	
August 21, 2024	(United States) Maycee Bell	DF	(United States) NJ/NY Gotham FC	Traded in exchange for $80,000 in allocation money and $10,000 in intra-league transfer funds.	
August 27, 2024	(United States) Victoria Haugen	DF	(United States) Virginia Tech Hokies	Former replacement players signed to new national team replacement contracts.	
August 27, 2024	(United States) Maya McCutcheon	DF	(United States) West Virginia Mountaineers	Former replacement players signed to new national team replacement contracts.	

=== Transfers out ===
Date	Player	Pos.	Destination club	Fee/notes	Ref.
November 20, 2023	(United States) Emily Gray	MF	(United States) Utah Royals	Traded in exchange for $30,000 of allocation money and 2024 Expansion Protection from the Utah Royals.	
November 20, 2023	(United States) Frankie Tagliaferri	MF	(United States) Utah Royals	Traded in exchange for $30,000 of allocation money and 2024 Expansion Protection from the Utah Royals.	
November 20, 2023	(United States) Sarah Clark	DF	(Australia) Canberra United FC	Out of contract.	
November 20, 2023	(United States) Emily Fox	DF	(England) Arsenal	Free agent signing.	
November 20, 2023	(Denmark) Rikke Madsen	FW	(England) Everton	Free agent signing.	
November 20, 2023	(United States) Kiki Pickett	DF	(United States) Bay FC	Free agent signing.	
November 20, 2023	(United States) Brittany Ratcliffe	FW	(United States) Washington Spirit	Free agent signing.	
December 15, 2023	(United States) Tess Boade	FW	(United States) Bay FC	Selected in the 2024 NWSL expansion draft.	
December 15, 2023	(United States) Katelyn Rowland	GK	(United States) Bay FC	Selected in the 2024 NWSL expansion draft.	
March 21, 2024	(Japan) Rikako Kobayashi	MF	(Japan) Tokyo Verdy Beleza	Mutual contract termination.	
July 3, 2024	(Denmark) Mille Gejl	FW	(England) Crystal Palace	Mutual contract termination.	
August 1, 2024	(United States) Jenna Winebrenner	DF	(United States) Dallas Trinity FC	Waived.	
August 21, 2024	(United States) Victoria Haugen	DF	(United States) North Carolina Courage	Waived.	
August 21, 2024	(United States) Maya McCutcheon	DF	(United States) North Carolina Courage	Waived.	
September 16, 2024	(United States) Maya McCutcheon	DF	(New Zealand) Wellington Phoenix FC	Waived.	
October 3, 2024	(United States) Victoria Haugen	DF	(United States) Tampa Bay Sun FC	Waived.	

=== Retirements ===
Date	Player	Pos.	Ref.
May 10, 2024	(United States) Clara Schilke	MF	

=== Preseason trialists ===
Trialists are non-rostered invitees during preseason and are not automatically signed. The Courage released their preseason roster on January 29, 2024. The club later added six more non-rostered invitees to their roster on February 9, 2024.

Player	Pos.	Previous club	Notes	Ref.
(United States) Rylee Baisden	FW	(Australia) Perth Glory FC	Not signed.	
(United States) Giovanna DeMarco	MF	(United States) San Diego Wave FC	Not signed.	
(United States) Bella Gaetino	FW	(United States) Michigan Hawks	Not signed.	
(United States) Victoria Haugen	DF	(United States) Virginia Tech Hokies	Signed to a national team replacement contract on July 16, 2024.	
(United States) Emma Hawkins	FW	(United States) Oklahoma Sooners	Not signed.	
(United States) Lauren Kellett	GK	(United States) TCU Horned Frogs	Not signed.	
(United States) Maya McCutcheon	DF	(United States) West Virginia Mountaineers	Signed to an injury replacement contract on March 13, 2024.	
(United States) Jenna Winebrenner	DF	(United States) Kansas City Current	Signed to an injury replacement contract on March 13, 2024.	
(United States) Cayla White	GK	(United States) Virginia Cavaliers	Not signed.	
