= List of North Carolina Courage seasons =

The North Carolina Courage is a professional women's soccer team based in Cary, North Carolina, that competes in the National Women's Soccer League (NWSL). It was founded when the Western New York Flash were relocated under new ownership ahead of the 2017 season. The team plays its home games at First Horizon Stadium at WakeMed Soccer Park.

== Key ==
Key to competitions

- National Women's Soccer League (NWSL) – The top-flight of women's soccer in the United States since its inaugural season in 2013.
- CONCACAF W Champions Cup (WCC) – The premier club competition in North American women's soccer since 2024, featuring teams that are champions of their respective domestic leagues. The winner will qualify for the FIFA Women's Club World Cup, planned to debut in 2026.
- NWSL Challenge Cup (CC) – A domestic cup competition organized by NWSL from 2020 to 2023; since 2024, it has been a single-match super cup between the NWSL Shield and NWSL Championship winners.
- NWSL x Liga MX Femenil Summer Cup (SC) – An international, in-season tournament played in 2024 with all teams from NWSL and four teams from Liga MX Femenil, the top-flight women's league in Mexico.
- NWSL Fall Series – A one-time tournament during the 2020 season that had been cancelled due to the COVID-19 pandemic.
- Women's International Champions Cup – An annual invitational tournament with international club teams held from 2018 to 2022.

Key to colors and symbols

1st or W	Winners
2nd or RU	Runners-up
3rd	Third place
♦	League top scorer
Italics	Ongoing competition

Key to cup record

- DNE = Did not enter
- DNQ = Did not qualify
- NH = Competition not held or canceled
- QR = Qualifying round
- PR = Preliminary round
- GS = Group stage
- Ro32 = Round of 32
- Ro16 = Round of 16
- QF = Quarterfinals
- SF = Semifinals
- F = Final
- RU = Runners-up
- W = Winners

== Seasons ==
Results of North Carolina Courage league and cup competitions by season
Season	League											Pos.	Playoffs	Other		Average attendance (Note: Average attendance is calculated from league matches only and excludes matches played behind closed doors.)	Top goalscorer(s) (Note: Only includes goals scored during the regular season.)	
Season	Div	League	Pld	W	L	D	GF	GA	GD	Pts	PPG	Pos.	Playoffs	Competition	Result	Average attendance	Player(s)	Goals
2017	1	NWSL	24	16	7	1	38	22	+16	49	2.04	1st	RU	—	—	5,058	Lynn Williams	9
2018	1	NWSL	24	17	1	6	53	17	+36	57	2.38	1st	W	Women's International Champions Cup	W	5,092	Lynn Williams	14
2019	1	NWSL	24	15	5	4	54	23	+31	49	2.04	1st	W	Women's International Champions Cup	RU	6,296	Lynn Williams	12
2020	1	NWSL	Regular season and playoffs canceled due to the COVID-19 pandemic											NWSL Challenge Cup NWSL Fall Series	QF 5th	—	—	—
2021	1	NWSL	24	9	9	6	28	23	+5	33	1.38	6th	QF	NWSL Challenge Cup	GS	4,125	Lynn Williams	7
2022	1	NWSL	22	9	8	5	46	33	+13	32	1.45	7th	DNQ	NWSL Challenge Cup	W	4,245	Debinha	12
2023	1	NWSL	22	9	7	6	29	22	+7	33	1.5	3rd	QF	NWSL Challenge Cup	W	5,319	Kerolin	10
2024	1	NWSL	26	12	11	3	34	28	+6	39	1.5	5th	QF	NWSL x Liga MX Femenil Summer Cup	SF	6,362	Ashley Sanchez	5
2025	1	NWSL	26	9	9	8	37	39	−2	35	1.35	9th	DNQ	—	—	7,684	Manaka Matsukubo	11
Total (as of 2025)			166	96	57	39	319	207	+112	327	1.7					6,312	Lynn Williams	42
