= 2022 North Carolina Courage season =

North Carolina Courage
2022 season
- Owner: Stephen Malik
- Club President: Francie Gottsegen
- Head Coach: Sean Nahas
- Stadium: WakeMed Soccer Park; Cary, North Carolina (Capacity: 10,000)
- NWSL Regular Season: 7th
- NWSL Challenge Cup: Champions (1st title)
- Top goalscorer: League: Debinha (12); All: Debinha (17)
- Highest home attendance: 6,376 (Sept. 24 vs. NJ/NY)
- Lowest home attendance: 3,084 (May 18 vs. ORL)
- Average home league attendance: 4,195
- Biggest win: 5–1 (Sept. 10 vs. LOU)
- Biggest defeat: 0–2 (July 1 vs. OL Reign)
| Home colors | Away colors |

The 2022 North Carolina Courage season was the team's sixth season as a professional women's soccer team. North Carolina Courage plays in the National Women's Soccer League, the top tier of women's soccer in the United States.

== Challenge Cup ==
The Challenge Cup is the NWSL's primary league cup tournament. It was first played in 2020 following the cancellation of the regular season due to the COVID-19 pandemic. Angel City and San Diego, new expansion clubs, competed for the first time in the Challenge Cup. In the 2021 cup, North Carolina had failed to advance beyond the group stage. The twelve league teams were divided into three groups, with North Carolina initially competing twice against the other three teams in its group: Gotham, Orlando, and Washington.

=== Group stage ===
| March 19, 2022 | North Carolina Courage | 2–0 | NJ/NY Gotham FC | Cary, North Carolina |
| 19:00 | Pinto 22'; Erceg 51' | Report | Cudjoe (yellow card) 46' | Stadium: WakeMed Soccer Park; Attendance: 2,537; Referee: Karen Callado |

| March 26, 2022 | North Carolina Courage | 1–0 | Orlando Pride | Cary, North Carolina |
| 19:00 | Smith (yellow card) 23'; Mathias 61' (pen.) | Report | Jónsdóttir (yellow card) 53'; Petersen (yellow card) 69' | Stadium: WakeMed Soccer Park; Attendance: 3,328; Referee: Joshua Encarnación |

| March 30, 2022 | Washington Spirit | 2–2 | North Carolina Courage | Washington, D.C. |
| 19:30 | Staab (yellow card) 14'; Rodman 58'; Sullivan (yellow card) 64'; Hatch 67' | Report | Debinha 5'; Smith 26'; K. Pickett (yellow card) 45+2'; Berkely (yellow card) 59'; Kurtz (yellow card) 76' | Stadium: Audi Field; Attendance: 2,155; Referee: Danielle Chesky |

| April 3, 2022 | NJ/NY Gotham FC | 1–1 | North Carolina Courage | Harrison, New Jersey |
| 15:00 | Monaghan (yellow card) 24'; Richardson (yellow card) 50'; Cudjoe (yellow card) 80'; Onumonu 84' | Report | Debinha 25'; Berkely (yellow card) 76' | Stadium: Red Bull Arena; Referee: Laura Rodriguez |

| April 16, 2022 | Orlando Pride | 2–4 | North Carolina Courage | Orlando, Florida |
| 19:00 | Jenkins 15', 56' (yellow card) 79'; Lawrence (yellow card) 73'; Montefusco (yellow card) 76' | Report | Montefusco 3' (o.g.); Daniels 6'; Smith 9'; Pinto (yellow card) 85'; Debinha 89' | Stadium: Exploria Stadium; Referee: Alyssa Nichols |

| April 23, 2022 | North Carolina Courage | 2–2 | Washington Spirit | Cary, North Carolina |
| 13:00 | Erceg (yellow card) 37'; Debinha 45+4' (pen.); Berkely 52' | Report | Hatch 15', 75' (pen.); Karina Rodriguez (yellow card) 19' | Stadium: WakeMed Soccer Park; Referee: Eric Tattersall |

==== Divisional standings ====
| Pos | Team | Pld | W | T | L | GF | GA | GD | Pts | Qualification | NC | WAS | NJY | ORL |
|---|---|---|---|---|---|---|---|---|---|---|---|---|---|---|
| 1 | North Carolina Courage | 6 | 3 | 3 | 0 | 12 | 7 | +5 | 12 | Advance to knockout stage | — | 2–2 | 2–0 | 1–0 |
| 2 | Washington Spirit | 6 | 2 | 4 | 0 | 12 | 7 | +5 | 10 | Advance to knockout stage based on ranking | 2–2 | — | 1–1 | 4–1 |
| 3 | NJ/NY Gotham FC | 6 | 1 | 3 | 2 | 5 | 8 | −3 | 6 | | 1–1 | 1–3 | — | 1–1 |
| 4 | Orlando Pride | 6 | 0 | 2 | 4 | 4 | 11 | −7 | 2 | | 2–4 | 0–0 | 0–1 | — |

Source: NWSL
Rules for classification: 1) Total points; 2) Total goal differential; 3) Total number of goals scored; 4) Head-to-head points record; 5) Head-to-head goal differential; 6) Head-to-head number of goals scored; 7) Fewest disciplinary points; 8) Drawing of lots

=== Knockout stage ===
| May 4, 2022 Semifinal | Kansas City Current | 1–2 | North Carolina Courage | Kansas City, Kansas |
| 19:30 CDT | Winebrenner (yellow card) 18'; Hamilton (yellow card) 68' (goal) 79' | Report | Debinha 19' (pen.); Emily Gray (yellow card) 55'; Ordoñez 36' (yellow card) 59'; Mathias (yellow card) 90+2' | Stadium: Children's Mercy Park; Attendance: 4,093; Referee: Natalie Simon |

=== Championship ===
| May 7 Final | North Carolina Courage | 2–1 | Washington Spirit | Cary, North Carolina |
| 13:00 EDT | Kerolin 10'; Aylmer 70' (o.g.) | Report | Hatch 35' | Stadium: WakeMed Soccer Park; Attendance: 3,163; Referee: Katja Koroleva |

Win

== Regular season ==
The 2022 season of the National Women's Soccer League saw 12 teams play 22 matches: one against every other team, with one match at each club's stadium. Three points were awarded for each win, one point per draw, and none for defeats. At the end of the season, the top two teams qualify for first-round byes in the NWSL Playoffs, while four more teams play in an opening playoff round.

=== Matches ===
| April 29 1 | Angel City FC | 2–1 | North Carolina Courage | Los Angeles |
| 19:30 PDT | Gilles 3' (yellow card) 39'; Endo 13' | Report | Gray (yellow card) 33'; Debinha 51'; Baucom (yellow card) 85'; Kerolin (yellow card) 88' | Stadium: Banc of California Stadium; Attendance: 22,000; Referee: Samantha Martinez |

| May 18 2 | North Carolina Courage | 1–2 | Orlando Pride | Cary, North Carolina |
| 19:00 EDT | Pinto 86' | Report | Leroux 4'; Cluff 44'; Jenkins (yellow card) 73' | Stadium: WakeMed Soccer Park; Attendance: 3,084 |

| May 22 3 | North Carolina Courage | 0–1 | San Diego Wave FC | Cary, North Carolina |
| 14:00 EDT | Kurtz (yellow card) 90+2' | Report | Morgan 41'; van Egmond (yellow card) 49'; Riehl (yellow card) 75' | Stadium: WakeMed Soccer Park; Attendance: 6,070 |

| May 29 4 | Houston Dash | 1–1 | North Carolina Courage | Houston, Texas |
| 18:00 CDT | Daly 45+6' | Report | Ordoñez 24'; Kurtz (yellow card) 80' | Stadium: PNC Stadium; Attendance: 4,852 |

| June 4 5 | Racing Louisville FC | 0–3 | North Carolina Courage | Louisville, Kentucky |
| 20:00 EDT | DeMelo (yellow card) 53' | Report | Kurtz 4'; Ordoñez 45+1'; Mathias (yellow card) 75'; Debinha 90+1' | Stadium: Lynn Family Stadium; Attendance: 5,738 |

| June 11 6 | Washington Spirit | 2–3 | North Carolina Courage | Leesburg, Virginia |
| 19:00 EDT | Sanchez 74'; Hatch 79' (pen.); Staab (yellow card) 90+1' | Report | Kerolin 6' (yellow card) 90+4'; Erceg 50'; O'Sullivan (yellow card) 89'; Kurtz 90+2' | Stadium: Segra Field; Attendance: 4,236 |

| June 19 7 | North Carolina Courage | 3–4 | Houston Dash | Cary, North Carolina |
| 17:00 EDT | O'Sullivan 6'; Ordoñez 57'; Debinha 59' | Report | Sánchez 15' (yellow card) 76'; Eddy 47', 50'; Prince 51' | Stadium: WakeMed Soccer Park; Attendance: 4,117 |

| July 1 8 | OL Reign | 2–0 | North Carolina Courage | Seattle |
| 19:00 PDT | Fishlock 52'; Balcer 74' | Report | Speck (yellow card) 55'; Kerolin (yellow card) 85' | Stadium: Lumen Field; Attendance: 7,519 |

| July 10 9 | Chicago Red Stars | 2–2 | North Carolina Courage | Bridgeview, Illinois |
| 17:00 CDT | Griffith 90+1' (DiBernardo); Kowalski 90+5' (Colaprico) | Report | Pickett 22' (Speck); Ratcliffe 49' (Mathias), (yellow card) 70'; Daniels (yellow card) 65'; Baucom (yellow card) 79' | Stadium: SeatGeek Stadium; Attendance: 4,098; Referee: Alyssa Nichols |

| July 29 10 | North Carolina Courage | 3–3 | Washington Spirit | Cary, North Carolina |
| 19:30 EDT | Bailey (yellow card) 29'; Ratcliffe 45' (O'Sullivan); Ordóñez 53' (Speck), 62' (pen.) | Report | Rodman 42' (Sanchez), 56'; McKeown 45+1' (O'Hara) | Stadium: WakeMed Soccer Park; Attendance: 5,211; Referee: John Griggs |
Note: Match was halted for lightning at the 24th minute and resumed after an hour's delay. Courage defender Jaelene Daniels refused to wear a pride-themed jersey for the match and was subsequently not rostered.

| August 5 11 | Portland Thorns FC | 3–3 | North Carolina Courage | Portland, Oregon |
| 19:30 PDT | Smith 8', 77' (Moultrie); Weaver 24' | Report | Ordoñez 61' (Pickett), 72' (Williams); Daniels 85' | Stadium: Providence Park; Attendance: 17,139 |

| August 13 12 | North Carolina Courage | 3–4 | Kansas City Current | Cary, North Carolina |
| 20:00 EDT | Ordoñez 17' (Debinha); Debinha 36' (Kerolin); Kurtz 56' (Pinto); Daniels (yellow card) 90+1' | Report | Hamilton 20' (LaBonta); LaBonta 45'; Kizer 60' (Lavogez); Lavogez 79' (Ball) | Stadium: WakeMed Soccer Park; Attendance: 5,092; Referee: Anya Voigt |

| August 20 13 | North Carolina Courage | 4–0 | Chicago Red Stars | Cary, North Carolina |
| 19:00 EDT | Ordoñez 10' (Pickett), 74' (Nagano); Nagano 64'; Mathias (yellow card) 72'; Baisden 88' (Kerolin) | Report | Stevens (yellow card) 81' | Stadium: WakeMed Soccer Park; Attendance: 3,571 |

| August 24 14 | North Carolina Courage | 3–1 | Portland Thorns FC | Cary, North Carolina |
| 19:00 EDT | Ordoñez 24' (Pickett); Debinha 50'; Speck 83'; Mathias (yellow card) 90+3' | Report | Rodríguez 63' (Ryan) | Stadium: WakeMed Soccer Park; Attendance: 3,114; Referee: Karen Callado |
Note: Rescheduled from May 7 to accommodate Challenge Cup final

| August 28 15 | Kansas City Current | 3–2 | North Carolina Courage | Kansas City, Kansas |
| 18:00 CDT | LaBonta 5' (pen.); Kizer 56' (Loera); Hamilton 59' (Del Fava); Ball (yellow card) 87' | Report | Kerolin 28' (Mathias), 48' (Kurtz); Speck (yellow card) 65' | Stadium: Children's Mercy Park; Attendance: 7,395; Referee: Malik Badawi |

| September 4 16 | NJ/NY Gotham FC | 0–1 | North Carolina Courage | Harrison, New Jersey |
| 17:00 EDT | Dorsey (yellow card) 71' | Report | Nagano 81'; Baisden (yellow card) 84' | Stadium: Red Bull Arena; Attendance: 3,124; Referee: Danielle Chesky |
Note: Originally scheduled for May 14, 2022, but delayed due to COVID-19 player availability

| September 10 17 | North Carolina Courage | 5–1 | Racing Louisville FC | Cary, North Carolina |
| 19:00 EDT | Kerolin 9' (O'Sullivan), 42'; Debinha 56' (Kerolin), 84' (pen.); Boade 90' (Kerolin) | Report | Lester (yellow card) 41'; Wyne (yellow card) 45+1'; Nadim 72' | Stadium: WakeMed Soccer Park; Attendance: 3,297; Referee: Samantha Martinez |

| September 14 18 | North Carolina Courage | 1–0 | Angel City FC | Cary, North Carolina |
| 19:00 EDT | Kerolin 54' (Debinha); Pinto (yellow card) 58' | Report | Lussi (yellow card) 5' | Stadium: WakeMed Soccer Park; Attendance: 3,661; Referee: Alex Billeter |
Note: Rescheduled from July 15 due to league COVID-19 protocols.

| September 17 19 | North Carolina Courage | 1–2 | OL Reign | Cary, North Carolina |
| 19:30 EDT | Cook 6' (o.g.); O'Sullivan (yellow card) 45+2' | Report | Lavelle 11'; Rapinoe 26'; Latsko (yellow card) 83'; McClernon (yellow card) 90+1' | Stadium: WakeMed Soccer Park; Attendance: 6,398 |

| September 21 20 | Orlando Pride | 0–3 | North Carolina Courage | Orlando, Florida |
| 19:00 EDT | | Report | Debinha 2', 53'; Boade 45+1'; Madsen (yellow card) 57' | Stadium: Exploria Stadium; Attendance: 3,258; Referee: Adorae Monroy |

| September 24 21 | North Carolina Courage | 3–0 | NJ/NY Gotham FC | Cary, North Carolina |
| 19:00 EDT | O'Sullivan (yellow card) 8'; Debinha 27' (Pickett), 34' (Williams), 81' (Boade) | Report | Torres (yellow card) 32' | Stadium: WakeMed Soccer Park; Attendance: 6,376 |

| September 30 22 | San Diego Wave FC | 0–0 | North Carolina Courage | San Diego |
| 19:00 PDT | McNabb (yellow card) 15' | Report | Bench (yellow card) 90+3' | Stadium: Snapdragon Stadium; Attendance: 18,000; Referee: Elijio Arreguin |

=== League table ===
| Pos | Team | Pld | W | D | L | GF | GA | GD | Pts | Qualification |
|---|---|---|---|---|---|---|---|---|---|---|
| 1 | OL Reign | 22 | 11 | 7 | 4 | 32 | 19 | +13 | 40 | NWSL Shield, Playoffs – semi-finals |
| 2 | Portland Thorns FC (C) | 22 | 10 | 9 | 3 | 49 | 24 | +25 | 39 | Playoffs – semi-finals |
| 3 | San Diego Wave FC | 22 | 10 | 6 | 6 | 32 | 21 | +11 | 36 | Playoffs – first round |
| 4 | Houston Dash | 22 | 10 | 6 | 6 | 35 | 27 | +8 | 36 | Playoffs – first round |
| 5 | Kansas City Current | 22 | 10 | 6 | 6 | 29 | 29 | 0 | 36 | Playoffs – first round |
| 6 | Chicago Red Stars | 22 | 9 | 6 | 7 | 34 | 28 | +6 | 33 | Playoffs – first round |
| 7 | North Carolina Courage | 22 | 9 | 5 | 8 | 46 | 33 | +13 | 32 | |
| 8 | Angel City FC | 22 | 8 | 5 | 9 | 23 | 27 | −4 | 29 | |
| 9 | Racing Louisville FC | 22 | 5 | 8 | 9 | 23 | 35 | −12 | 23 | |
| 10 | Orlando Pride | 22 | 5 | 7 | 10 | 22 | 45 | −23 | 22 | |
| 11 | Washington Spirit | 22 | 3 | 10 | 9 | 26 | 33 | −7 | 19 | |
| 12 | NJ/NY Gotham FC | 22 | 4 | 1 | 17 | 16 | 46 | −30 | 13 | |

Source: NWSL
Rules for classification: Tiebreakers
(C) Champions

==== Results summary ====
| Overall | | | | | | | | Home | | | | | | Away | | | | | |
| Pld | W | D | L | GF | GA | GD | Pts | W | D | L | GF | GA | GD | W | D | L | GF | GA | GD |
|---|---|---|---|---|---|---|---|---|---|---|---|---|---|---|---|---|---|---|---|
| 22 | 9 | 5 | 8 | 46 | 33 | +13 | 32 | 5 | 1 | 5 | 27 | 18 | +9 | 4 | 4 | 3 | 19 | 15 | +4 |

Last updated: September 30, 2022.
Source: NWSLsoccer.com

==== Results by matchday ====
| Matchday | 1 | 2 | 3 | 4 | 5 | 6 | 7 | 8 | 9 | 10 | 11 | 12 | 13 | 14 | 15 | 16 | 17 | 18 | 19 | 20 | 21 | 22 |
|---|---|---|---|---|---|---|---|---|---|---|---|---|---|---|---|---|---|---|---|---|---|---|
| Stadium | A | H | H | A | A | A | H | A | A | H | A | H | H | H | A | A | H | H | H | A | H | A |
| Result | L | L | L | D | W | W | L | L | D | D | D | L | W | W | L | W | W | W | L | W | W | D |
| Position | 12 | 12 | 12 | 11 | 12 | 12 | 12 | 12 | 12 | 12 | 12 | 12 | 10 | 9 | 9 | 9 | 8 | 8 | 8 | 8 | 8 | 7 |

Updated to match(es) played on September 30, 2022. Source: NWSL
A = Away; H = Home; W = Win; D = Draw; L = Loss

== Players ==
As of September 30, 2022.

North Carolina has used a total of 30 players during the 2022 season, and there have been 14 different goal scorers. There have also been three squad members — forward Valérie Gauvin, who was traded to the Houston Dash on August 23, 2022; midfielder Haleigh Stackpole; and goalkeeper Marisa Bova — who have not made a first-team appearance in the campaign.

The team has scored a total of 60 goals in all competitions. The highest scorers have been Debinha with 17 goals, and Diana Ordoñez with 12 goals.

Key

No. = Squad number

Pos = Playing position

Nat. = Nationality

Apps = Appearances

GK = Goalkeeper

DF = Defender

MF = Midfielder

FW = Forward

= Yellow cards

= Red cards

Numbers in parentheses denote appearances as substitute. Players with name struck through and marked † left the club during the playing season.

Player statistics
| No. | Pos. | Nat. | Name | Challenge Cup | | | | NWSL | | | | Total | | | |
| No. | Pos. | Nat. | Name | Apps | Goals | A yellow rectangular card | A red rectangular card | Apps | Goals | A yellow rectangular card | A red rectangular card | Apps | Goals | A yellow rectangular card | A red rectangular card |
|---|---|---|---|---|---|---|---|---|---|---|---|---|---|---|---|
| 0 | GK | (United States) | Katelyn Rowland | 8 | 0 | 0 | 0 | 4 | 0 | 0 | 0 | 12 | 0 | 0 | 0 |
| 1 | GK | (United States) | Casey Murphy | 0 | 0 | 0 | 0 | 18 | 0 | 0 | 0 | 18 | 0 | 0 | 0 |
| 2 | DF | (United States) | ~~Taylor Smith~~ † | 8 (3) | 2 | 1 | 0 | 4 (2) | 0 | 0 | 0 | 12 (5) | 2 | 1 | 0 |
| 3 | DF | (United States) | Kaleigh Kurtz | 8 | 0 | 1 | 0 | 22 | 3 | 2 | 0 | 30 | 3 | 3 | 0 |
| 4 | DF | (United States) | Carson Pickett | 7 (1) | 0 | 0 | 0 | 20 (1) | 1 | 0 | 0 | 27 (2) | 1 | 0 | 0 |
| 5 | MF | (United States) | Brianna Pinto | 7 (3) | 1 | 1 | 0 | 22 (5) | 1 | 1 | 0 | 29 (8) | 2 | 2 | 0 |
| 6 | DF | (New Zealand) | Abby Erceg | 8 | 1 | 1 | 0 | 19 | 1 | 0 | 0 | 27 | 2 | 1 | 0 |
| 7 | MF | (United States) | Malia Berkely | 7 (2) | 1 | 2 | 0 | 16 (5) | 0 | 0 | 0 | 23 (7) | 1 | 2 | 0 |
| 8 | MF | (Republic of Ireland) | Denise O'Sullivan | 8 | 0 | 0 | 0 | 19 (1) | 1 | 3 | 0 | 27 (1) | 1 | 3 | 0 |
| 9 | FW | (Brazil) | Kerolin | 5 (2) | 1 | 0 | 0 | 13 | 6 | 3 | 0 | 18 (2) | 7 | 3 | 0 |
| 10 | MF | (Brazil) | Debinha | 7 | 5 | 0 | 0 | 18 | 12 | 0 | 0 | 25 | 17 | 0 | 0 |
| 11 | DF | (United States) | Merritt Mathias | 8 | 1 | 2 | 0 | 19 (7) | 0 | 3 | 0 | 27 (7) | 1 | 5 | 0 |
| 12 | FW | (Mexico) | Diana Ordoñez | 6 (4) | 1 | 1 | 0 | 19 (2) | 11 | 0 | 0 | 25 (6) | 12 | 1 | 0 |
| 13 | DF | (United States) | Ryan Williams | 3 (3) | 0 | 0 | 0 | 18 (8) | 0 | 0 | 0 | 21 (11) | 0 | 0 | 0 |
| 14 | DF | (New Zealand) | Katie Bowen | 1 (1) | 0 | 0 | 0 | 2 (1) | 0 | 0 | 0 | 3 (2) | 0 | 0 | 0 |
| 15 | DF | (United States) | Jaelene Daniels | 8 (2) | 1 | 0 | 0 | 19 (11) | 1 | 2 | 0 | 27 (13) | 2 | 2 | 0 |
| 16 | MF | (United States) | Emily Gray | 4 (2) | 0 | 1 | 0 | 3 (1) | 0 | 1 | 0 | 7 (3) | 0 | 2 | 0 |
| 19 | MF | (Jamaica) | Havana Solaun | 1 | 0 | 0 | 0 | 1 (1) | 0 | 0 | 0 | 2 (1) | 0 | 0 | 0 |
| 23 | DF | (United States) | Kiki Pickett | 5 (2) | 0 | 1 | 0 | 4 (4) | 0 | 0 | 0 | 9 (6) | 0 | 1 | 0 |
| 24 | MF | (United States) | Frankie Tagliaferri | 0 | 0 | 0 | 0 | 5 (3) | 0 | 0 | 0 | 5 (3) | 0 | 0 | 0 |
| 25 | MF | (United States) | Meredith Speck | 8 (5) | 0 | 0 | 0 | 19 (10) | 1 | 2 | 0 | 27 (15) | 1 | 2 | 0 |
| 27 | FW | (United States) | Brittany Ratcliffe | 0 | 0 | 0 | 0 | 10 (7) | 2 | 1 | 0 | 10 (7) | 2 | 1 | 0 |
| 28 | MF | (United States) | Tess Boade | 1 (1) | 0 | 0 | 0 | 5 (1) | 2 | 0 | 0 | 6 (2) | 2 | 0 | 0 |
| 29 | FW | (United States) | Rylee Baisden | 1 | 0 | 0 | 0 | 9 (8) | 1 | 1 | 0 | 10 (8) | 1 | 1 | 0 |
| 33 | FW | (United States) | ~~Jorian Baucom~~ † | 1 | 0 | 2 | 0 | 6 (5) | 0 | 2 | 0 | 7 (5) | 0 | 4 | 0 |
