= Riley Jackson =

American soccer player (born 2005)

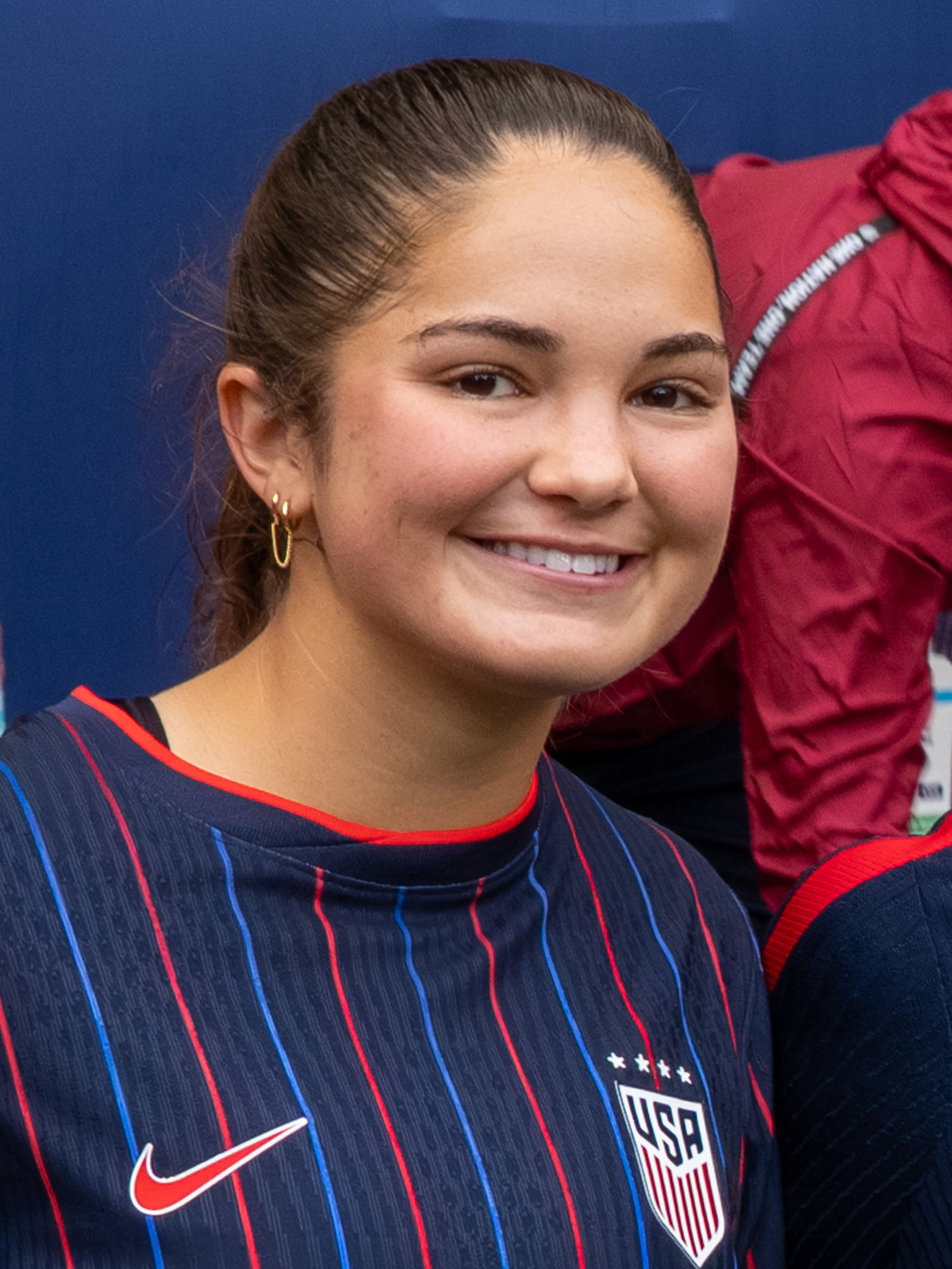
- Jackson with the United States in 2026

Personal information
- Full name: Riley Francis Jackson
- Date of birth: December 2, 2005 (age 20)
- Height: 5 ft 7 in (1.70 m)
- Position: Midfielder

Team information
- Current team: North Carolina Courage
- Number: 16

Youth career
- Roswell Santos SC
- Concorde Fire
- 2021–2023: Blessed Trinity Titans

Senior career*
Years	Team	Apps	(Gls)
2023–	North Carolina Courage	69	(5)

International career^{‡}
2022	United States U17	12	(2)
2024	United States U20	15	(1)
2025–	United States U23	4	(0)
2026–	United States	1	(0)
Medal record
Women's soccer
FIFA U-20 Women's World Cup
Bronze medal – third place	Colombia 2024
- * Club domestic league appearances and goals as of 06:54, November 8, 2026 (UTC) ‡ National team caps and goals as of January 27, 2026

Riley Francis Jackson (born December 2, 2005) is an American professional soccer player who plays as a midfielder for the North Carolina Courage of the National Women's Soccer League (NWSL) and the United States national team. She was named the Gatorade National Player of the Year in 2022 and signed with the Courage at age 17 in 2023.

Jackson represented the United States at the under-17, under-20, and under-23 levels, winning bronze at the 2024 FIFA U-20 Women's World Cup, before making her senior debut in 2026.

== Early life ==
Jackson grew up in Roswell, Georgia. She began playing soccer with local club Roswell Santos SC, where her father coached her team. After ten years there, she joined ECNL club Concorde Fire, playing up an age group. She was named the ECNL Southeast Conference Player of the Year in 2021. In 2022, she was named the ECNL National Player of the Year after leading the Fire to the ECNL under-18/19 national title.

Jackson played high school soccer for Blessed Trinity Catholic High School in Roswell, totaling 36 goals and 48 assists. She was named the Gatorade National Player of the Year as a sophomore in 2022 after scoring 14 goals with 18 assists and leading Blessed Trinity to a 19–2–1 record and the GHSA Class 5A state semifinals. She committed to play college soccer for Duke during her junior year. TopDrawerSoccer ranked her as the fourth-best prospect in the 2024 class.

== Club career ==
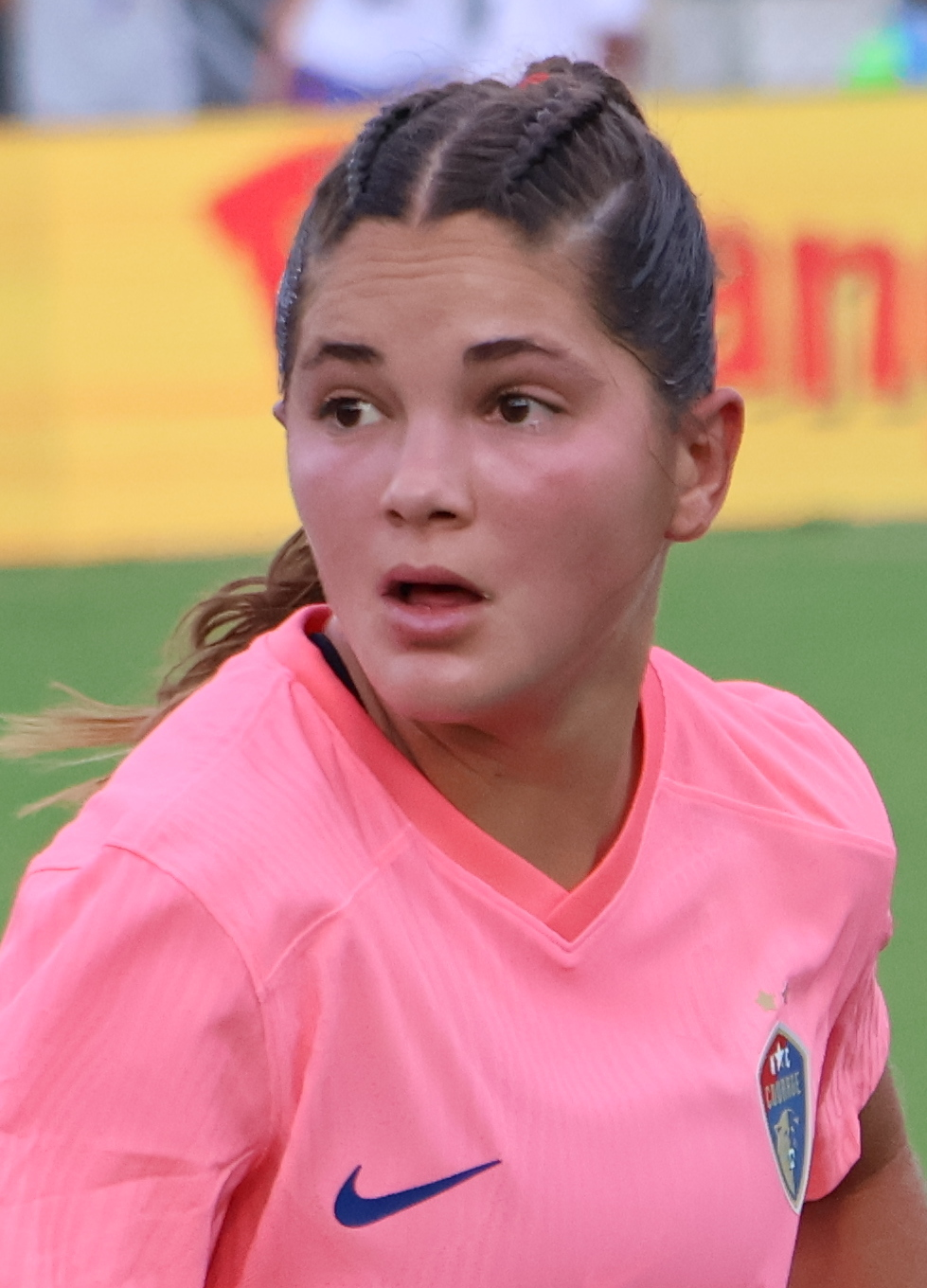
Jackson with the North Carolina Courage in 2024

North Carolina Courage head coach Sean Nahas first invited Jackson to train with the Courage in the summer of 2022. The next summer, she was offered professional terms and decided to give up her college eligibility and sign with the club. On July 28, 2023, the Courage announced that they had signed 17-year-old Jackson to her first professional contract on a two-and-half-year deal, with the option for another year, using the NWSL's recently established Under-18 Entry Mechanism. She had a foot injury that kept her out for the rest of the year.

Jackson made her professional debut as a 90th-minute substitute for Ashley Sanchez in the season-opening 5–1 win over the Houston Dash on March 16, 2024. She earned her first start in her 12th appearance on June 23, a 3–1 home win over the Chicago Red Stars. On July 26, she scored her first professional goal, a stoppage-time equalizer from outside the box, against Racing Louisville in the NWSL x Liga MX Femenil Summer Cup; following the 1–1 draw, she scored the opening penalty kick in the shootout victory. She played in 18 regular-season games in 2024, starting 3, as the Courage placed fifth in the league. She was an unused substitute in the playoff quarterfinal loss to the Kansas City Current.

Narumi Miura's departure to the Washington Spirit opened a starting role for Jackson in the 2025 season. On March 15, she scored her first regular-season goal in a season-opening 1–1 road draw with Racing Louisville. She played in 25 league games in 2025, starting 23, and scored 2 goals as the Courage placed ninth and missed the playoffs. Following the season, the Courage signed Jackson to a three-year contract extension through 2028.

On May 2, 2026, Jackson made her 50th regular-season appearance, becoming the youngest Courage player and fourth-youngest NWSL player to reach the milestone.

== International career ==
Jackson was first called into camp with the United States youth national team at the under-15 level in October 2019. She trained again with the team in March 2020 at a camp run by her future Courage coach Sean Nahas. When youth soccer returned from its COVID-19 pandemic hiatus, Jackson traveled abroad for the first time to play for the national under-17 team at the 2022 CONCACAF Women's U-17 Championship in the Dominican Republic. She co-captained the team to win the tournament, scoring two goals and making three assists, and was awarded the Golden Ball as the tournament's best player. She recorded two assists at the 2022 FIFA U-17 Women's World Cup, where the United States fell to Nigeria in the quarterfinals on penalties. Jackson was one of two United States players whose penalties were saved in the shootout.

Jackson played friendlies for the under-20 team before being selected to the roster for the 2024 FIFA U-20 Women's World Cup. She played all but 45 minutes at the U-20 Women's World Cup, helping the United States finish in third place, its best result since 2012. She converted a penalty kick in a shootout win over Germany in the quarterfinals. She was called up by Emma Hayes into Futures Camp, training concurrently with the senior national team, in January 2025.

Jackson was called up to the senior national team for the first time in January 2026. She made her senior international debut on January 27, starting the entire match and assisting Trinity Rodman's goal in a 5–0 friendly win over Chile.

== Career statistics ==
=== International ===
As of match played January 27, 2026

Appearances and goals by national team and year
National team	Year	Apps	Goals
United States	2026	1	0
Total		1	0

== Honors and awards ==
North Carolina Courage

- NWSL Challenge Cup: 2023

United States U20

- FIFA U-20 Women's World Cup bronze medal: 2024

United States

- SheBelieves Cup: 2026
