= Tyler Lussi =

American soccer player (born 1995)

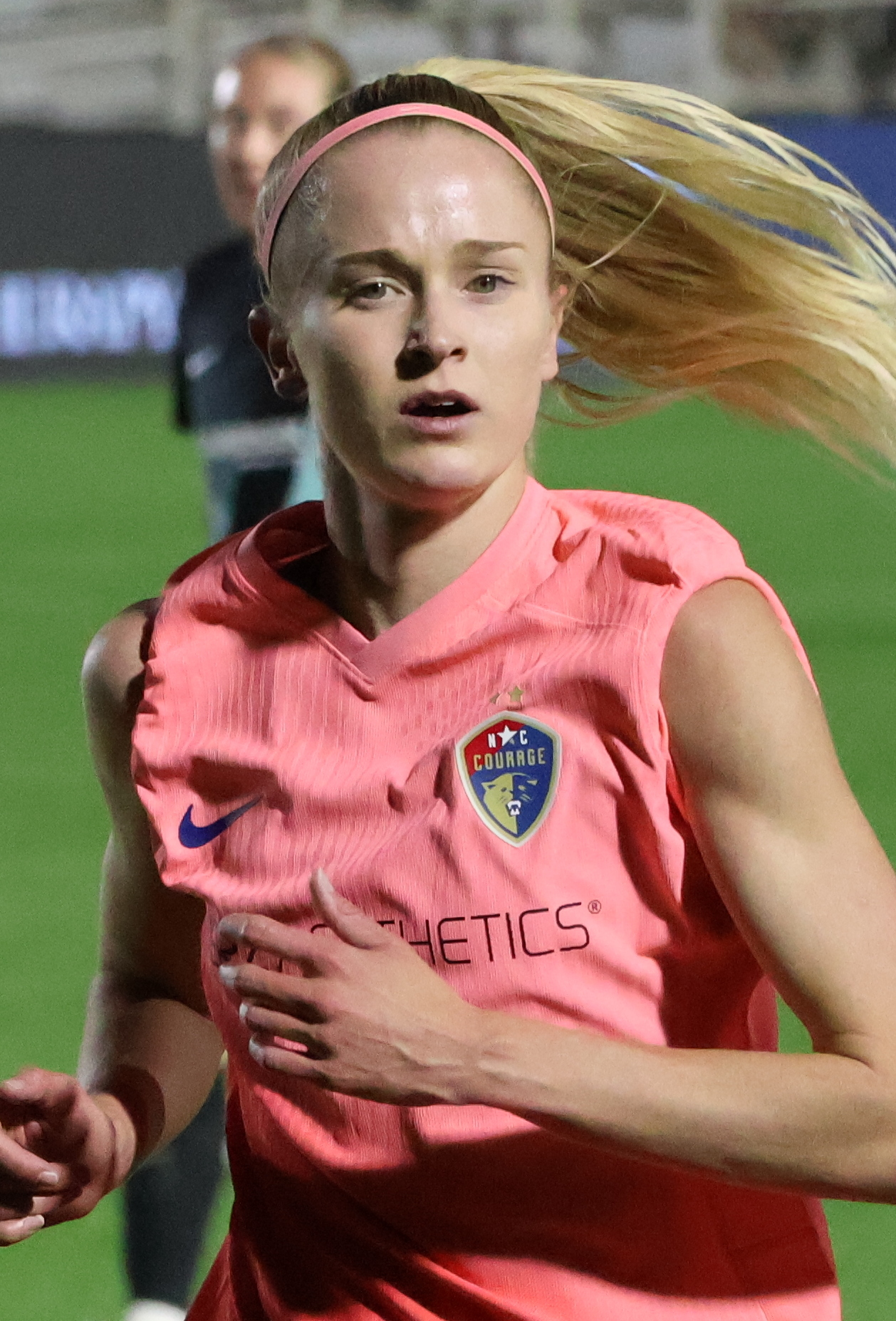
- Lussi with the North Carolina Courage in 2024

Personal information
- Full name: Tyler Tompkins Lussi
- Date of birth: January 26, 1995 (age 31)
- Place of birth: Gibson Island, Maryland, United States
- Height: 5 ft 7 in (1.70 m)
- Positions: Forward; right back

Team information
- Current team: DC Power FC
- Number: 10

Youth career
- Bethesda Soccer Club

College career
Years	Team	Apps	(Gls)
2013–2016	Princeton Tigers	68	(53)

Senior career*
Years	Team	Apps	(Gls)
2017–2021	Portland Thorns	42	(5)
2022	Angel City	20	(0)
2023–2025	North Carolina Courage	62	(12)
2026	Carolina Ascent	11	(4)
2026–	DC Power FC	0	(0)

International career^{‡}
2017	United States U23	3	(0)
- * Club domestic league appearances and goals as of 17:26, June 4, 2026 (UTC) ‡ National team caps and goals as of October 9, 2021

Tyler Tompkins Lussi (born January 26, 1995) is an American professional soccer player who plays as a forward for USL Super League club DC Power FC. She played college soccer for the Princeton Tigers and was drafted by the Portland Thorns in the third round of the 2017 NWSL College Draft. She also played in the NWSL for Angel City FC and the North Carolina Courage and the USL Super League for the Carolina Ascent.

== College career ==
Lussi played for Princeton Tigers from 2013 to 2016, while majoring in history. In her first season she won the Ivy League Rookie of the Week award three times, becoming the first player to do so in one season, and won Ivy Player of the Week in her first week. She scored 10 goals in 17 games, making her the highest-scoring freshman in 31 years.

In her second season she scored 18 goals in 16 games, and twice won the Ivy League Player of the Week award At the end of the season was selected for the first-team All-Ivy League, first-team All-ECAC, second-team NSCAA All-Mid-Atlantic Region and was picked as the Ivy League Offensive Player of the Year.

In her third season she scored 15 goals in 19 games, winning Ivy League Player of the Week four times. She was picked a second consecutive time as the Ivy League Offensive Player of the Year, and was selected again for the first-team All-Ivy League and for the NSCAA second-team All-America.

In her fourth and final season, she scored 10 goals in 16 games and twice won the Ivy League Player of the Week. At the end of the season she was selected a third consecutive time for the first-team All-Ivy League and also for the NSCAA All-Mid-Atlantic Region first team. During her four-year collegiate career, Lussi established new records with her 53 career goals and 122 career points.

== Club career ==
=== Portland Thorns ===
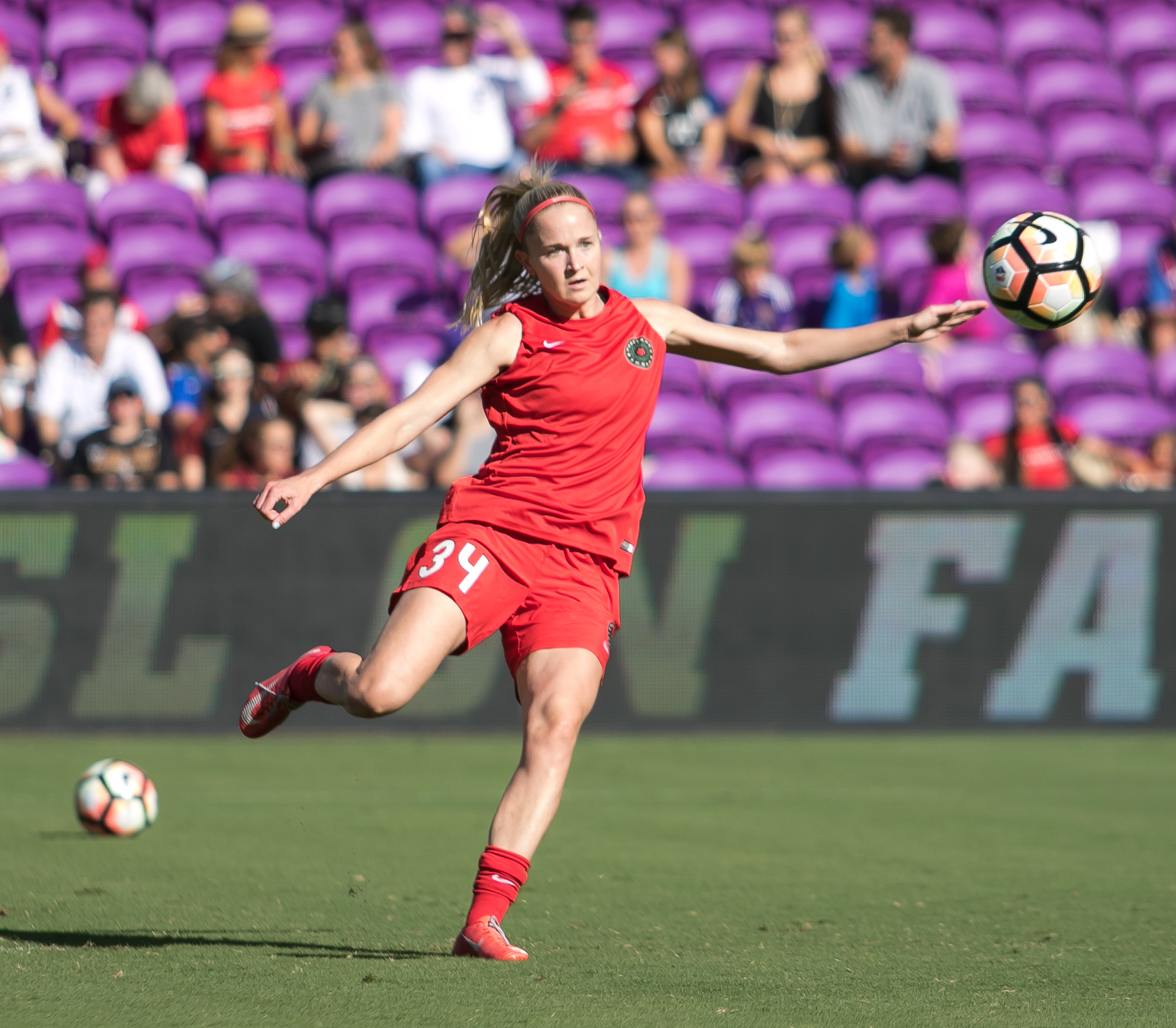
Lussi playing for the Portland Thorns in 2017

Lussi was drafted in the third round of the 2017 NWSL College Draft with the 21st overall pick by the Portland Thorns FC. On July 1, 2017, after a two-week trial, was signed by the club. She made her professional debut a week later, being substituted for Mana Shim in a 1–1 draw against the Houston Dash. On August 5, 2017, she scored her first professional goal in a 2–1 victory over the Houston Dash. She finished her rookie season with 5 appearances and 3 starts and was an unused substitute as the Thorns won the NWSL Championship 1–0 against the North Carolina Courage. The following season, she made 15 appearances with 3 starts and was unused as the Thorns lost their championship game rematch with the Courage.

Lussi never made more than 3 regular-season starts for the Thorns in a season. On July 14, 2019, she scored in the 90+4th minute in a 4–3 win over the Orlando Pride. She finished her five years in Portland with 5 goals and 4 assists in 42 regular-season appearances.

=== Angel City ===
On December 8, 2021, Lussi was traded to expansion team Angel City FC along with forward Simone Charley. She featuring in the starting lineup of Angel City's first-ever game on March 19, 2022, drawing 1–1 to the San Diego Wave in the Challenge Cup group stage. A week later, she scored her first club goal in a 3–1 loss to OL Reign in the Challenge Cup on March 26. However, due to positional need including an injury to Jasmyne Spencer, Lussi spent most the season as Angel City's starting right back despite not having previously played as a defender.

=== North Carolina Courage ===
On January 20, 2023, Lussi was traded to the North Carolina Courage in exchange for defender Merritt Mathias. She signed a new contract to the end of the next year with an option to extend further to 2025, which was agreed to. Lussi debuted for the Courage on the opening matchday on March 25, 2023, starting in a 1–0 win over the Kansas City Current. On April 28, she scored her first club goal in a 1–0 win over the Houston Dash which was not played in full due to weather. She finished the season with 6 goals (second on the team to MVP Kerolin) of which 5 came as the game winners in 1–0 victories.

Lussi scored and assisted in a 2–0 win over the Portland Thorns on April 13, 2024, the first of her three games in a row with goals, also scoring against Angel City and the Seattle Reign. She played one game at right back on June 15, a 0–0 draw to the Orlando Pride. She finished the season with 4 goals which was second on the team after Ashley Sanchez.

=== Carolina Ascent ===
In February 2026, Lussi signed with USL Super League club Carolina Ascent FC. She debuted for the club in a 2–0 victory over the Dallas Trinity. On March 13, she made her first start and scored her first goal for the club, netting the 1–0 game winner against the Tampa Bay Sun. After her strong debut performances in the league, she was named the Player of the Month for March 2026. In the season finale, she scored in a 3–1 win over Sportig JAX to help deny them the Players' Shield. She spent just half a season with the Ascent, scoring 4 goals from 13 appearances and helping them reach the league final, which they lost to Lexington SC.

=== DC Power FC ===
On July 7, 2026, Lussi signed with fellow USL Super League club DC Power FC. She made her club debut on August 15, 2026, subbing on for Abby Boyan in DC Power's season-opening loss to the Carolina Ascent.

== International career ==
In February 2017, Lussi was called up to the United States under-23 squad for the 2017 La Manga Tournament in Spain. In the tournament she came on as a substitute in the matches against Japan and against England, and started the match against Norway assisting Morgan Andrews for the only goal of the match.

== Career statistics ==
As of April 5, 2025

Appearances and goals by club, season and competition
Club	League	Season	League		Playoffs (Note: Includes NWSL Playoffs)		Cup (Note: Includes the NWSL Challenge Cup)		Other		Total	
Club	League	Season	Apps	Goals	Apps	Goals	Apps	Goals	Apps	Goals	Apps	Goals
Portland Thorns FC	NWSL	2017	5	1	0	0	—		—		5	1
Portland Thorns FC	NWSL	2018	15	1	0	0	—		—		15	1
Portland Thorns FC	NWSL	2019	12	2	0	0	—		—		12	2
Portland Thorns FC	NWSL	2020	— (Note: The 2020 NWSL regular season and playoffs were canceled due to the COVID-19 pandemic.)				6	0	4	0	10	0
Portland Thorns FC	NWSL	2021	10	1	0	0	4	1	—		14	2
Portland Thorns FC	Total		42	5	0	0	10	1	4	0	56	6
Angel City FC	NWSL	2022	20	0	—		6	1	—		26	1
North Carolina Courage	NWSL	2023	19	6	1	0	8	0	—		28	6
North Carolina Courage	NWSL	2024	22	4	0	0	—		4 (Note: Includes the NWSL x Liga MX Femenil Summer Cup)	0	26	4
North Carolina Courage	NWSL	2025	1	0	—		—		—		1	0
North Carolina Courage	Total		42	10	1	0	8	0	4	0	55	10
Career total			104	15	1	0	24	2	8	0	137	17

== Honors ==
Portland Thorns

- NWSL Championship: 2017
- NWSL Shield: 2021
- NWSL Challenge Cup: 2021

North Carolina Courage

- NWSL Challenge Cup: 2023
