= Fūka Nagano =

Japanese footballer (born 1999)

Fūka Nagano 長野 風花
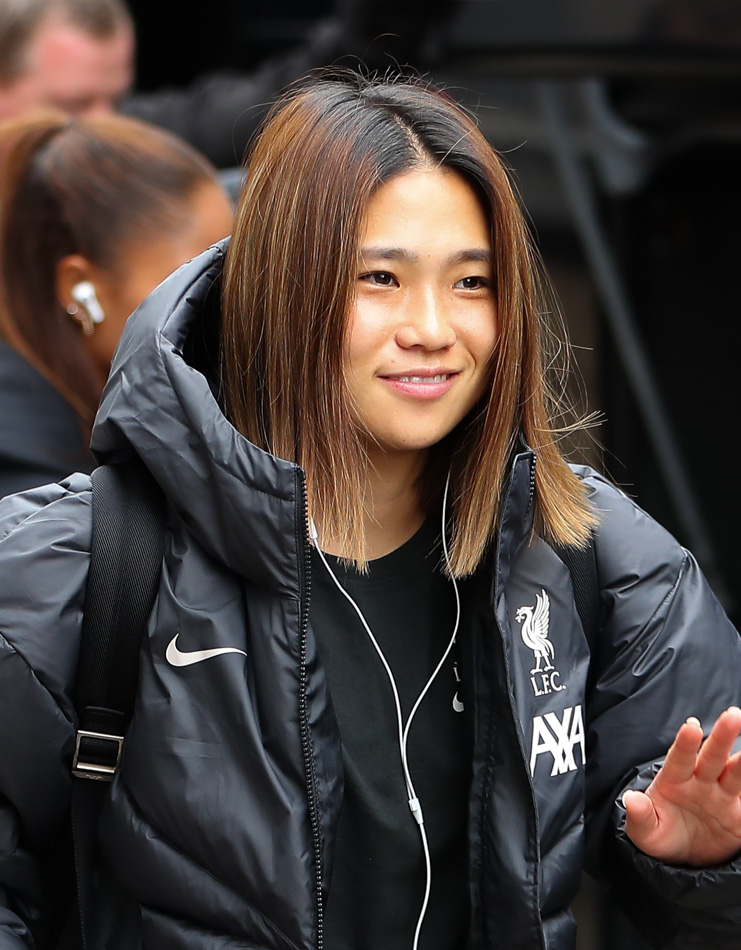
- Nagano in 2024

Personal information
- Date of birth: 9 March 1999 (age 27)
- Place of birth: Edogawa, Tokyo, Japan
- Height: 1.60 m (5 ft 3 in)
- Position: Midfielder

Team information
- Current team: Liverpool
- Number: 8

Youth career
- 2013–2014: Urawa Reds

Senior career*
Years	Team	Apps	(Gls)
2014–2017	Urawa Reds	23	(0)
2018	Hyundai Steel Red Angels	21	(1)
2019–2020	Chifure AS Elfen Saitama	34	(1)
2021–2022	Mynavi Sendai	20	(0)
2022	North Carolina Courage	11	(2)
2023–	Liverpool	77	(1)

International career^{‡}
2013–2016	Japan U17	31	(5)
2017–2018	Japan U20	20	(2)
2018–	Japan	61	(1)
Medal record
Women's football
Representing Japan
AFC Women's Asian Cup
Winner	2026 Australia
FIFA U-20 Women's World Cup
Winner	2018 France
AFC U-19 Women's Championship
Winner	2017 China
FIFA U-17 Women's World Cup
Winner	2014 Costa Rica
Runner-up	2016 Jordan
AFC U-16 Women's Championship
Runner-up	2015 China
- * Club domestic league appearances and goals as of 16:03, 28 September 2026 (UTC) ‡ National team caps and goals as of 01:42, 14 September 2026 (UTC)

Fūka Nagano (長野 風花, Nagano Fūka; IPA: [naꜜɡano ɸɯːka]; born 9 March 1999) is a Japanese professional footballer who plays as a midfielder for Women's Super League club Liverpool and the Japan national team.

Nagano begun her senior career with Urawa Reds in 2014. She joined WK league club Hyundai Steel Red Angels in 2018. She then returned to Japan and played for the Division 2 side Chifure AS Elfen Saitama before joining Mynavi Sendai for the inaugural WE League season. In 2022, she went overseas to join NWSL club North Carolina Courage during the midseason. At the end of the season, she left the club to join Liverpool in the Women's Super League.

Nagano has represented Japan at every youth level and has won both the FIFA U-17 Women's World Cup and FIFA U-20 Women's World Cup with her country. In 2017, she was named Asian Young Footballer of the Year at the AFC Annual Awards. In 2018, she made her senior international debut for Japan in a friendly match. She has since represented Japan in the FIFA Women's World Cup, the 2024 Paris Olympics, AFC Women's Asian Cup, and the EAFF E-1 Football Championship.

== Club career ==
=== Urawa Reds ===
In 2014, Nagano played for Urawa Reds in Japan's top-division Nadeshiko League and helped the team win a league championship.

=== Incheon Hyundai Steel Red Angels ===
On 18 March 2018, Nagano signed a one-year contract with Incheon Hyundai Steel Red Angels. On 23 April, she made her debut in a 0–0 draw with Gyeongju KHNP. On 1 June, she scored her first goal in a 7–1 home victory against Changnyeong. She won the WK league in her lone season with the team.

=== Chifure AS Elfen Saitama ===
In January 2019, Nagano left South Korea and returned to her native Japan to play for Division 2 club Chifure AS Elfen Saitama. She stated that her motivation to join was because of her great respect for the coach of the team, Hiroshi Yoshida.

=== Mynavi Sendai ===
In January 2021, Nagano joined Mynavi Sendai.

=== North Carolina Courage ===
In July 2022, Nagano confirmed she would be joining the North Carolina Courage of the NWSL. She scored her first goal for the Courage on 20 August in a 4–0 victory over Chicago Red Stars.

=== Liverpool ===
In January 2023, Nagano joined Women's Super League side Liverpool. She was due to complete her debut on 22 January 2023 in a league match against Chelsea before the match was abandoned after 6 minutes of play. She made her official competitive debut in a 1–0 loss against West Ham United in the FA WSL Cup quarterfinals on 25 January 2023. She quickly established herself as a key part of the team as she started in all of Liverpool's remaining matches in the 2022–23 season.

Nagano continued to be an integral part of the Liverpool line-up in the Women's Super League during the 2023–24 season as she started in 21 of 22 matches in the league. She helped Liverpool finished 4th in the league, their highest position in the league since their league triumph in 2014.

Nagano scored her first goal for Liverpool on 14 March 2025, with the second goal in a 3–1 win over Manchester United at Anfield.

On 1 August 2025, the club confirmed that Nagano had signed a new contract, extending her stay at Liverpool.

== International career ==
=== Youth ===
In 2016, Nagano competed at the All Japan Youth (U-15) Women's Championship. She was part of the under-16 team that won the 2013 AFC U-16 Women's Championship in China and of the under-17 team that won the 2014 FIFA U-17 Women's World Cup in Costa Rica. She captained Japan to the final of the 2016 FIFA U-17 Women's World Cup in Jordan, where they were defeated by North Korea on penalty kicks, and won the Golden Ball award as the tournament's top scorer.

In June 2018, Nagano was called up to the senior team for the first time for a friendly match against New Zealand.

In August 2018, Nagano was part of Japan's victorious team in the 2018 FIFA U-20 Women's World Cup in France, turning in a player of the match performance in the semi-final, and scoring a goal in the final in a 3–1 win over Spain.

=== Senior ===
On 11 November 2018, Nagano debuted for senior team against Norway. She established herself as a regular in the Japan national team in 2022, and she was part of the team that won the EAFF E-1 Football Championship in Japan.

On 13 June 2023, she was included in the 23-player squad for the FIFA Women's World Cup 2023. She played a pivotal role in Japan's performance in the tournament. She started in all but one game as they finished top of their group and reached the quarterfinals in the world cup.

On 14 June 2024, Nagano was included in the Japan squad for the 2024 Summer Olympics.

Nagano was part of the Japan squad that won the 2025 SheBelieves Cup. She was called up to the national team for the 2026 AFC Women's Asian Cup. She started in four matches for Japan as she helped the team to their third continental title, winning all matches in the process.

== Career statistics ==
=== Club ===
As of match played 27 September 2026

Appearances and goals by club, season and competition
Club	Season	League			National Cup (Note: Includes the Empress's Cup, Women's FA Cup)		League Cup (Note: Includes the Nadeshiko League Cup, FA Women's League Cup)		Total	
Club	Season	Division	Apps	Goals	Apps	Goals	Apps	Goals	Apps	Goals
Urawa Reds	2014	Nadeshiko League	3	0	0	0	—		3	0
Urawa Reds	2015	Nadeshiko League	14	0	1	0	—		15	0
Urawa Reds	2016	Nadeshiko League	5	0	1	0	8	1	14	1
Urawa Reds	2017	Nadeshiko League	1	0	2	0	4	0	7	0
Urawa Reds	Total		23	0	4	0	12	1	39	1
Incheon Hyundai Steel Red Angels	2018	WK League	21	1	—		—		21	1
Chifure AS Elfen Saitama	2019	Nadeshiko League Div. 2	16	1	4	0	8	0	28	1
Chifure AS Elfen Saitama	2020	Nadeshiko League Div. 2	18	0	2	1	—		20	1
Chifure AS Elfen Saitama	Total		34	1	6	1	8	0	48	2
Mynavi Sendai	2021-22	WE League	20	0	1	0	—		21	0
North Carolina Courage	2022	NWSL	11	2	—		—		11	2
Liverpool	2022–23	Women's Super League	11	0	1	0	1	0	13	0
Liverpool	2023–24	Women's Super League	21	0	2	0	2	0	25	0
Liverpool	2024–25	Women's Super League	21	1	2	0	3	0	26	1
Liverpool	2025–26	Women's Super League	20	0	3	0	4	0	27	0
Liverpool	2026–27	Women's Super League	4	0	0	0	1	0	5	0
Liverpool	Total		77	1	8	0	11	0	96	1
Career total			186	5	19	1	31	1	237	7

=== International ===
As of match played 6 June 2026

Appearances and goals by national team and year
National Team	Year	Apps	Goals
Japan	2018	1	0
Japan	2021	2	0
Japan	2022	13	1
Japan	2023	17	0
Japan	2024	12	0
Japan	2025	8	0
Japan	2026	8	0
Total		61	1

Scores and results list Japan's goal tally first, score column indicates score after each Nagano goal.

List of international goals scored by Fūka Nagano
No.	Date	Venue	Opponent	Score	Result	Competition	Ref.
1	19 July 2022	Kashima Soccer Stadium, Kashima, Japan	South Korea	2–1	2–1	2022 EAFF E-1 Football Championship	

== Honours ==
Urawa Red Diamonds

- Nadeshiko League: 2014
- Empress's Cup runner-up: 2014
- Nadeshiko League Cup runner-up: 2017

Incheon Hyundai Steel Red Angels

- WK League: 2018

Japan U17

- AFC U-16 Women's Championship: 2013
- FIFA U-17 Women's World Cup: 2014

Japan U20

- AFC U-19 Women's Championship: 2017
- FIFA U-20 Women's World Cup: 2018

Japan

- EAFF E-1 Football Championship: 2022
- SheBelieves Cup: 2025
- AFC Women's Asian Cup: 2026

=== Individual ===
- FIFA U-17 Women's World Cup Golden Ball: 2016
- Asian Young Footballer of the Year: 2016
