= Casey Murphy =

American soccer player (born 1996)

- Murphy with the Boston Legacy in 2026

Personal information
- Full name: Casey Grace Murphy
- Date of birth: April 25, 1996 (age 30)
- Place of birth: Bridgewater, New Jersey, United States
- Height: 6 ft 1 in (1.85 m)
- Position: Goalkeeper

Team information
- Current team: Boston Legacy
- Number: 1

Youth career
- PDA Slammers

College career
Years	Team	Apps	(Gls)
2014–2017	Rutgers Scarlet Knights	67	(0)

Senior career*
Years	Team	Apps	(Gls)
2018–2019	Montpellier	29	(0)
2019–2020	OL Reign	20	(0)
2021–2025	North Carolina Courage	108	(0)
2026–	Boston Legacy	25	(0)

International career^{‡}
2015–2016	United States U20	13	(0)
2017–2019	United States U23		
2021–	United States	20	(0)
Medal record
Olympic Games
Gold medal – first place	2024 Paris	Team
CONCACAF W Gold Cup
Winner	2024 United States
CONCACAF W Championship
Winner	2022 Mexico
- * Club domestic league appearances and goals as of 02:15, November 8, 2026 (UTC) ‡ National team caps and goals as of October 27, 2024

Casey Grace Murphy (born April 25, 1996) is an American professional soccer player who plays as a goalkeeper for Boston Legacy FC of the National Women's Soccer League (NWSL) and the United States national team.

Murphy played college soccer for the Rutgers Scarlet Knights, twice earning Big Ten Goalkeeper of the Year and All-American honors. She began her professional career with Montpellier in 2018 before entering the NWSL with Reign FC, joining the Courage in 2021, and shifting to the Legacy for its inaugural season in 2026.

Murphy made her senior debut for the United States in 2021. She was included on the squad that won gold at the 2024 Paris Olympics.

== Early life ==
Murphy was raised in Bridgewater Township, New Jersey, the daughter of Michael and Jill Murphy, and has a brother. She started playing soccer at the age of five. At around the age of 10, she started to play only as a goalkeeper. Murphy attended and played soccer and basketball for Bridgewater-Raritan High School. She also trained with the Players Development Academy (PDA) Slammers, part of the Elite Clubs National League, where she won a U17 national championship. TopDrawerSoccer.com rated Murphy as the No. 18 overall youth player in New Jersey and a four-star recruit.

== College career ==
In 2014, Murphy chose to attend Rutgers University, where she played NCAA Division I college soccer for the Rutgers Scarlet Knights until 2017.

She redshirted her final year to compete in the 2018 FIFA U-20 Women's World Cup. Murphy earned the Female Big Ten Medal of Honor in May 2018. Throughout her career, she earned several accolades and distinctions, including twice the Big Ten Goalkeeper of the Year, twice an All-Big Ten First Team selection, and twice an All-American. Murphy was also named a 2017 MAC Hermann Trophy semifinalist. With 45 clean sheets in her college career, Murphy is Rutgers' all-time leader for career shutouts and ranks second in Big Ten history.

== Club career ==
=== Montpellier ===
On January 18, 2018, National Women's Soccer League club Sky Blue FC selected Murphy with the 13th overall pick in the 2018 NWSL College Draft. The day after the draft, Murphy signed a professional contract with Montpellier HSC to play in France's Division 1 Féminine. She made her professional debut against Fleury on February 21. She was initially expected to return to the NWSL in June, but in April she extended her contract with Montpellier. She started 11 games in her first season with Montpellier as they placed third in the 2017–18 season, earning the Division 1 Best Keeper Award and being selected by French media in the league's Best XI. She also participated in both the Coupe de France Féminine and the UEFA Women's Champions League.

Murphy played every minute of the 2018–19 season as Montpellier again placed third behind league powerhouses Lyon and Paris Saint-Germain.

=== Reign FC ===
On May 15, 2019, Murphy signed with Reign FC (later also known as OL Reign). She made her NWSL debut on May 27, 2019, making four saves in a 2–1 win against the North Carolina Courage, which marked the Reign's first victory over the team. She kept 6 clean sheets in 19 starts in her first NWSL season as the Reign placed fourth in the standings and was one of three finalists for NWSL Goalkeeper of the Year. The following year, she made only six club appearances during the pandemic-shortened 2020 season.

=== North Carolina Courage ===
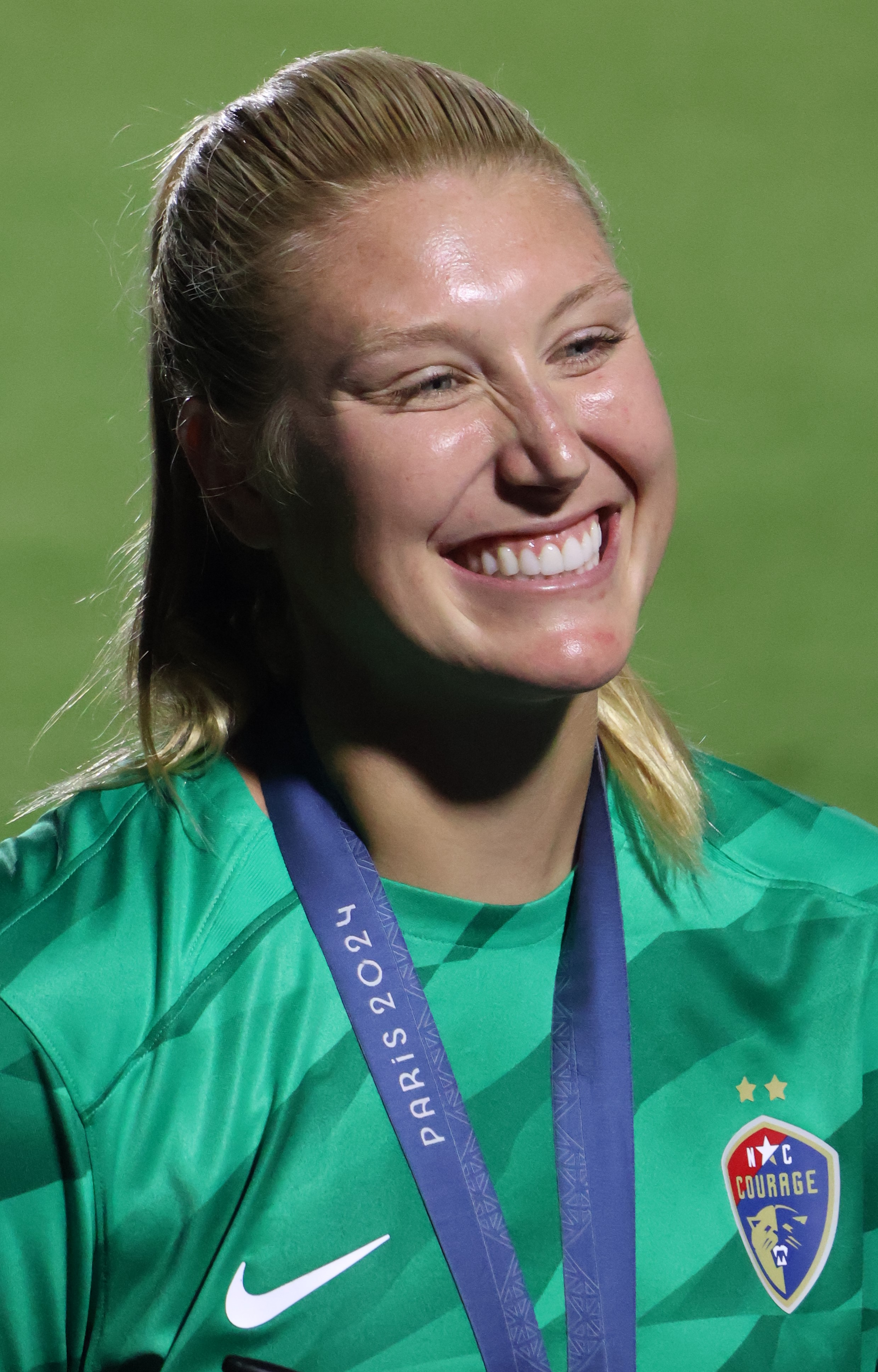
Murphy with the North Carolina Courage in 2024

On October 22, 2020, Murphy was traded to the North Carolina Courage along with $140,000 in allocation money in exchange for Crystal Dunn. She signed a two-year contract with the team before the season began. She started all but one match for the Courage in the 2021 season, keeping 11 clean sheets in 23 games. On November 7, 2021, she made a season-high 12 saves in a 1–0 loss to the Washington Spirit in the first round of the playoffs.

Murphy balanced duties for club and country during the 2022 season. She was an unused substitute for Katelyn Rowland in the preseason NWSL Challenge Cup final on May 7, 2022, which the Courage won against the Washington Spirit. She recorded 6 clean sheets in 18 games in the regular season as North Carolina finished in seventh place, missing the playoffs. At the start of 2023, she signed a three-year extension with the Courage. On September 9, 2023, she helped North Carolina to a 2–0 victory over Racing Louisville in the Challenge Cup final. She started all but two games in the 2023 regular season, recording 9 clean sheets in 20 games as North Carolina rose to third in the standings.

On September 8, 2024, Murphy saved Alex Morgan's penalty kick in the last game of Morgan's career, helping the Courage to a 4–1 away win against the San Diego Wave. Murphy played every minute of the 2024 season, completing her first iron woman season with the Courage as they placed fifth in the standings.

Murphy became a free agent at the end of the 2025 season and did not re-sign with the Courage. It was reported in October 2025 that she had signed a contract with new National Women's Soccer League expansion team Boston Legacy FC, which will begin play in 2026.

=== Boston Legacy FC ===
On December 15, 2025, Boston Legacy FC announced that they had signed Murphy through the 2029 season with a mutual option for 2030.

== International career ==
Murphy has been a United States youth international at the U14, U15, U18, U20, and U23 levels. She represented the United States at the 2016 FIFA U-20 Women's World Cup.

Murphy was a starter for the United States under-20 national team during the 2016 FIFA U-20 Women's World Cup and also started for the United States under-23 team.

Murphy received her first call-up to the senior United States women's national soccer team for a set of friendlies in June 2018 against China PR, but did not play.

Murphy was again called up by United States head coach Vlatko Andonovski for the 2021 SheBelieves Cup, but did not appear in the tournament.

Murphy was part of the senior United States team to travel to Australia for a pair of friendly matches in November 2021. She made her first appearance for the senior team on November 26, 2021, in a 3–0 victory against the Australia women's national soccer team where she recorded a clean sheet and received player of the match honors. In international friendlies from 2022 until April 7, 2023, in preparation for the 2023 FIFA Women's World Cup, Murphy and incumbent starter Alyssa Naeher each had 11 starting appearances for the United States.

Murphy was selected to the 18-player roster for the 2024 Summer Olympics. She went unused as a substitute for Alyssa Naeher as the United States won the gold medal.

== Personal life ==
While at Rutgers, she began dating track and field athlete Chris Mirabelli. They became engaged in 2021 and married in December 2023 in Philadelphia.

== Career statistics ==
=== International ===
As of match played October 27, 2024

National Team	Year	Apps	Goals	Shutouts
United States	2021	2	0	1
United States	2022	9	0	6
United States	2023	6	0	6
United States	2024	3	0	2
Total		20	0	15

== Honors ==
United States

- Summer Olympic Games Gold Medal: 2024
- CONCACAF Women's Championship: 2022
- SheBelieves Cup: 2021; 2022; 2023,2024
- CONCACAF W Gold Cup: 2024

North Carolina Courage

- NWSL Challenge Cup: 2022, 2023

Individual

- Big Ten Conference Goalkeeper of the Year: 2015, 2017
