= Marisa Jordan =

American soccer player (born 2000)

- Jordan with the Kansas City Current in 2026

Personal information
- Birth name: Marisa Bova
- Date of birth: August 6, 2000 (age 26)
- Height: 6 ft 2 in (1.88 m)
- Position: Goalkeeper

Team information
- Current team: Kansas City Current
- Number: 1

Youth career
- SC Waukesha

College career
Years	Team	Apps	(Gls)
2018–2021	Purdue Boilermakers	60	(0)

Senior career*
Years	Team	Apps	(Gls)
2022–2025	North Carolina Courage	5	(0)
2026–	Kansas City Current	9	(0)
- * Club domestic league appearances and goals as of 16:48, November 14, 2026 (UTC)

Marisa Jordan (née Bova; born August 6, 2000) is an American professional soccer player who plays as a goalkeeper for the Kansas City Current of the National Women's Soccer League (NWSL). She played college soccer for the Purdue Boilermakers and was selected by the North Carolina Courage in the fourth round of the 2022 NWSL Draft.

== Early life ==
Jordan grew up in Hartland, Wisconsin, and has three brothers. Her mother, Amy, played college volleyball for Drake, and her brother Dante played soccer for UNC Asheville. She played soccer as a forward until age twelve, when the coach of her club team, SC Waukesha, asked her to play in goal; the team won six straight state cup championships from 2011 to 2017. Jordan graduated early from Arrowhead High School and began attending Purdue University in the spring of 2018.

== College career ==
Jordan played six games for Purdue as a freshman in 2018. She began regularly starting for the Boilermakers in her sophomore season and had 66 saves to 18 goals allowed in 20 games. She shut out top seed Wisconsin with six saves in the first round of the 2019 Big Ten tournament. In the pandemic-shortened 2020–21 season, she started all 12 games and recorded 35 saves to 10 goals allowed and contributed one game-winning assist.

Jordan captained the Boilermakers in her senior season in 2021, posting seven clean sheets in 22 games and helping the team qualify for the NCAA tournament for the first time in twelve years. She set a program record with 113 saves on the season, becoming the first Boilermaker to pass the single-season 100-save mark, and earned second-team All-Big Ten honors. Fans celebrated her with the phrase "Mo says no". Jordan made six saves against Loyola Chicago in the first round of the NCAA tournament, where Purdue won 1–0 in double overtime. She made a career-high ten saves in the second round, drawing 1–1 to Notre Dame in double overtime, but lost on penalties. A three-time Academic All-Big Ten honoree, Jordan graduated from Purdue with dual Bachelor of Science and Bachelor of Arts degrees in December 2021.

== Club career ==
=== North Carolina Courage ===
The North Carolina Courage selected Jordan with the 45th overall pick in the fourth round of the 2022 NWSL Draft. She was signed to an initial one-year contract with a one-year option, which was exercised following her rookie season. On November 17, 2023, she signed a two-year contract extension with the Courage, despite not yet having debuted as the third-stringer behind Casey Murphy and Katelyn Rowland.

With the departure of Rowland for Bay FC, Jordan entered her third season as Murphy's primary backup. On July 20, 2024, Jordan made her professional debut in the NWSL x Liga MX Femenil Summer Cup against the Orlando Pride. She started the match and held the year's eventual champions to a 1–1 draw, then saved two penalty kicks in the resulting shootout to secure a 5–4 win. She played all four games for the Courage in the Summer Cup, including a second penalty shootout win against Racing Louisville, as the Courage reached the semifinals.

On January 8, 2025, the Courage announced Jordan had signed a new long-term contract through 2027. On September 6, she was handed her NWSL regular-season debut by acting head coach Nathan Thackeray, making four saves in a 1–1 draw with the Utah Royals. Two weeks later, she kept her first NWSL clean sheet in a 1–0 win over the Orlando Pride. She played five consecutive regular-season games until Murphy returned as starter for the end of the season.

=== Kansas City Current ===
On December 11, 2025, Jordan was traded to the Kansas City Current for a 2026 international roster spot. She joined the club as the backup to Brazilian star Lorena, the reigning NWSL Goalkeeper of the Year. She made her competitive debut for the Current on June 26, 2026, starting in a 2–0 loss to Gotham FC in the NWSL Challenge Cup. The following week, she made her regular-season debut and kept her first clean sheet for the club in a 3–0 win over expansion team Denver Summit.

== Personal life ==
She married Levi Jordan on March 7, 2025.

== Honors and awards ==
North Carolina Courage

- NWSL Challenge Cup: 2022, 2023

Kansas City Current

- NWSL Championship: 2026

Individual

- Second-team All-Big Ten: 2021
