= Curt Johnson (soccer) =

American soccer executive

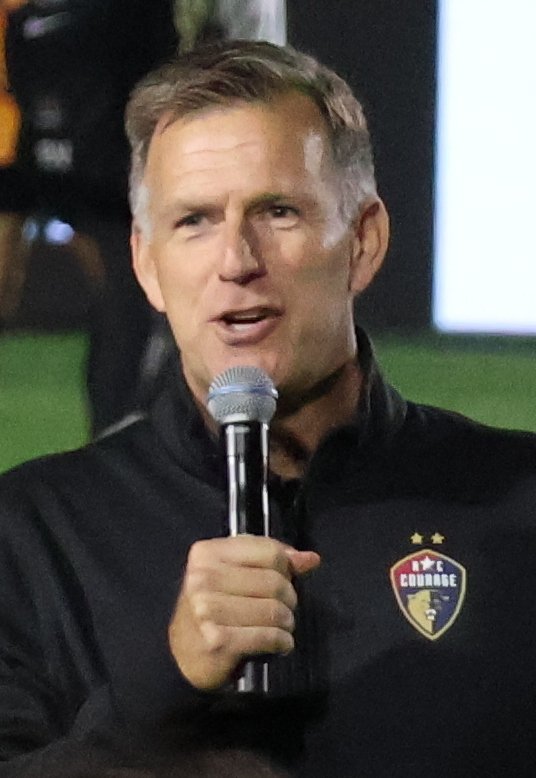
- Johnson in 2024

Denver Summit FC
- Title: General manager

Career information
- High school: Ravenscroft School
- College: North Carolina State University

Career history
- Richmond Kickers (1997–1999) Vice President of Operations/General Manager; Kansas City Wizards (1999–2006) General Manager; Carolina Hurricanes (2007–2008) Director of Marketing; US Club Soccer (2008–2011) Senior Vice President; North Carolina FC (2011–2024) President/General Manager; North Carolina Courage (2017–2024) President/General Manager; Denver Summit FC (2025–) General Manager

Awards and highlights
- MLS Cup champion (2000); U.S. Open Cup champion (2004); 2x NWSL Champion (2018, 2019)

Curt Johnson is an American soccer executive who is the general manager of Denver Summit FC of the National Women's Soccer League (NWSL).

Raised in Raleigh, North Carolina, Johnson played college soccer for the NC State Wolfpack. He entered the front office space as general manager of the Richmond Kickers. He later worked for the Kansas City Wizards, Carolina Hurricanes, and US Club Soccer. He was the president/general manager of North Carolina FC from 2011 to 2024 and the North Carolina Courage from 2017 to 2024.

== Early life and playing career ==
A Raleigh native, Johnson graduated from Ravenscroft School. Following his prep career at Ravenscroft School and Capital Area Soccer League (CASL), Johnson continued his player career at the collegiate level in his hometown at North Carolina State University, starring for the NC State Wolfpack men's soccer team from 1987 to 1990. During his career with the Wolfpack, Johnson appeared in 72 matches, and served as a captain in his senior season, as NC State won an ACC Championship and reached the NCAA semifinals. After his playing career, Johnson would later return to NC State as an assistant coach. He graduated with a degree in communications studies. In 2013, Johnson was inducted into the North Carolina Soccer Hall of Fame.

== Front office career ==
Johnson's first stint as a professional soccer executive came in the late 1990s with the Richmond Kickers of the A-League. From 1997–99, Johnson served in a leadership role, both as vice president of operations and general manager. During Johnson's tenure with the Kickers, the team won the Atlantic Division in 1998.

After his third season in Richmond, Johnson was chosen as the general manager of the Kansas City Wizards by Lamar Hunt and Clark Hunt. During his tenure with the Wizards, Johnson made an immediate impact, as Kansas City completed the double by winning both the MLS Supporters' Shield and the MLS Cup in 2000. Four years later, Johnson and Kansas City once again lifted a trophy in 2004 with a win over the Chicago Fire in the U.S. Open Cup Final. Johnson was instrumental in the transfer of ownership of the club from the Hunt family to OnGoal, LLC.

Before joining North Carolina Football Club in 2011, Johnson served as the Carolina Hurricanes' director of marketing from 2007–08 and later worked for U.S. Club Soccer, where he helped to develop strategies for growth of the game at the youth levels for both boys and girls.

=== North Carolina Football Club ===
In February 2011, it was announced that Johnson would serve as President of the Carolina RailHawks. In Johnson's first season leading the club, the RailHawks won the NASL regular season title under first-year head coach Martin Rennie, going 17W–8L–3D with a then league-record 13-game unbeaten streak.

From 2012–14, the RailHawks developed a reputation as one of the toughest second-division teams in the country to play against due to their performances in the Lamar Hunt U.S. Open Cup. From 2012–14, the RailHawks recorded five wins against Major League Soccer opponents, including three in as many years against the LA Galaxy. The RailHawks reached the quarterfinals of the competition in both 2012 and 2014.

In 2015, Johnson helped oversee the transfer in ownership of the RailHawks from Traffic Sports USA to Stephen Malik, a local Triangle businessman and medical software entrepreneur. In 2016, Johnson was instrumental in the RailHawks hosting English Premier League Club West Ham United in front of a then North Carolina Football Club-record 10,125 fans.

In December 2016, the RailHawks rebranded to North Carolina FC, and in January 2017 Malik announced the addition of the North Carolina Courage, an NWSL team which Johnson was named president and general manager of.

Both NCFC and the Courage reached the postseason in 2017, as the Courage claimed the NWSL Shield and reached the league’s title game. Johnson also played a role in negotiating a partnership between North Carolina Football Club, Capital Area Soccer League and Triangle Futbol Club, which led to the creation of NCFC Youth, which Johnson currently serves on the board of.

Ahead of the 2018 season, Johnson helped orchestrate a deals that saw the Courage acquire U.S. Women’s National Team star Crystal Dunn and former USWNT standout Heather O'Reilly, and the team became the first in NWSL history win both the shield and NWSL Championship.

Following the 2018 USL season, Johnson made his second NCFC coaching change, as the club announced the hiring of former U.S. Men’s National Team Manager Dave Sarachan on December 17, 2018. With Sarachan in charge, NCFC finished seventh in the USL Championship Eastern Conference and reached the playoffs for the second time in three years in 2019. Meanwhile, the Courage became the first team in NWSL history to win a league championship on its home field, as it defeated the Chicago Red Stars 4–0 in front 10,227 spectators, the largest crowd in North Carolina Football Club history.

=== Denver Summit FC ===
Expansion team Denver Summit FC announced Johnson as the team's first general manager on May 29, 2025.
