= Sean Nahas =

American soccer coach (born 1978)

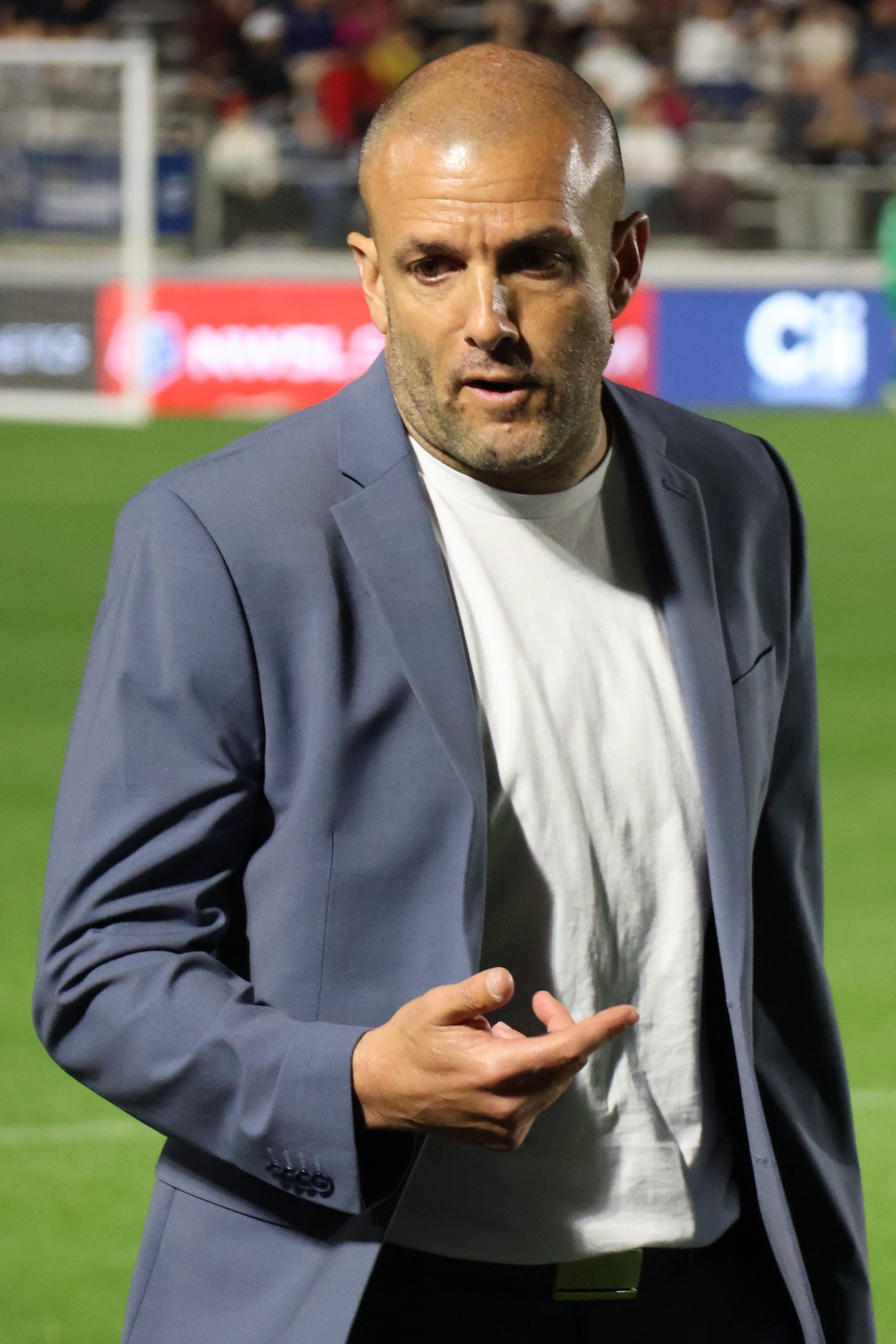
- Nahas with the North Carolina Courage in 2024

Personal information
- Date of birth: April 24, 1978 (age 48)

College career
Years	Team	Apps	(Gls)
- Queens Royals

Managerial career
- 2007: Carolina RailHawks U23
- 2012–??: United States U-14 (assistant)
- 2016: United States U-20 (assistant)
- 2017–2021: North Carolina Courage (assistant)
- 2021: North Carolina Courage (interim)
- 2022–2025: North Carolina Courage

Sean Nahas (born April 24, 1978) is an American soccer coach and former player who was most recently the head coach of the North Carolina Courage of the National Women's Soccer League (NWSL).

== Early life ==
Nahas grew up in East Northport, New York, and played youth soccer. He is the brother of North Carolina Tar Heels women's soccer head coach Damon Nahas.

== College career ==
Nahas played two years of collegiate soccer for Queens Royals. He later graduated from Hofstra University.

== Coaching career ==
Nahas held youth soccer leadership roles with the Capital Area Soccer League since 2004, and also served as assistant and scout for various youth national teams. He joined the North Carolina Courage senior team's staff as an assistant coach upon the team's founding via relocation in 2017, working for head coach Paul Riley, and also directed the Courage's U.S. Soccer Development Academy girls' team.

On July 8, 2021, The Athletic reported that Nahas had interviewed for the head coaching role at NWSL expansion team Angel City FC of Los Angeles, California, and was the team's preferred candidate. This report generated criticism from Angel City FC's supporters groups, who posted lists of women candidates to social media and publicly suggested that Angel City FC hire a woman. At the time, NJ/NY Gotham FC head coach Freya Coombe was the only woman working as an NWSL head coach. Angel City FC reportedly eliminated Nahas from contention by July 12 and announced the hiring of Coombe a month later.

In October 2021, Nahas became interim head coach of the Courage following the firing of Riley as part of the NWSL's response to the 2021 NWSL abuse scandal. He was elevated to the role permanently in December 2021. Nahas served as Courage head coach for over three years before being fired on August 6, 2025. During his time with the Courage he posted a 36-35-19 overall record.

== Managerial statistics ==
As of October 2, 2022

Managerial record by team and tenure, all official competitions
Team	From	To	Record							
Team	From	To	P	W	D	L	GF	GA	GD	Win %
North Carolina Courage	October 6, 2021	present	36	15	9	12	67	53	+14	41.67
Career totals			36	15	9	12	67	53	+14	41.67

== Honors ==
North Carolina Courage, as head coach

- NWSL Challenge Cup champions: 2022
