= 2018 Washington Spirit season =

Washington Spirit
2018 season
- Owner: Bill Lynch
- General manager: Chris Hummer
- Head coach: Tom Torres (interim)
- Stadium: Maryland SoccerPlex
- NWSL: 8th
- Top goalscorer: Ashley Hatch (4)
- Highest home attendance: 7,976 (Aug 25 vs. Portland at Audi Field)
- Lowest home attendance: 2,433 (May 23 vs. North Carolina)
- Average home league attendance: 3,892
Home colors	Away colors

The 2018 season is Washington Spirit's sixth season, competing in the National Women's Soccer League, the top division of women's soccer in the United States. On August 21, the Spirit parted ways with Head Coach and General Manager Jim Gabarra, assistant coach Tom Torres took over as interim Head Coach for the remaining 3 games of the season.

== Review ==
After a difficult 2017 season, the Spirit began rebuilding their team, continuing with a youth centered approach. Considered a successful 2018 draft, Washington recruited U.S. international Andi Sullivan (no. 1 overall pick) and Canadian international Quinn (Note: Then known as Rebecca Quinn) (no. 3 overall pick). In addition to the draft, the Spirit traded Crystal Dunn's player rights for 2017 Rookie of the Year Ashley Hatch and rookie outside back Taylor Smith. The unfortunate folding of Boston Breakers allowed the Spirit to bring in U.S. international playmaker, Rose Lavelle via the subsequent dispersal draft. What seemed to be only key loss for the Spirit was captain and anchor centerback, Shelina Zadorsky, traded to Orlando Pride for promising goalkeeper, Aubrey Bledsoe.

The season opened with a loss to Seattle, but saw the return of Joanna Lohman, held back in 2017 through injury, and scored in her substitute appearance. After several mediocre performances in March and April, the Spirit would struggle for the remainder of the season, winning only one more match (of two all season) against struggling Sky Blue FC. A combination of injuries to forwards Mallory Pugh, Havana Solaun, and Arielle Ship hamstrung the Spirit attack who were shutout 15 matches (including a 7-match streak).

On August 21, after eight straight losses and being eliminated from playoff contention, the Spirit fired head coach, Jim Gabarra, and appointed assistant coach, Tom Torres as interim head coach. Torres lead the Spirit through the final three matches of the season at home, including the Spirit's debut at newly opened Audi Field against Portland Thorns on August 25. The match set a new club record for home attendance with 7,976 fans.

The last match of the season against Sky Blue FC, the Spirit ended a league-record setting goal drought at 765-minutes after Arielle Ship scored the opener of a 1–1 draw in the 71st minute. The match also earned Aubrey Bledsoe the league-wide record for saves in a single season at 108.

== Club ==
=== Roster ===
The first-team roster of Washington Spirit.

Note: Flags indicate national team as defined under FIFA eligibility rules; some limited exceptions apply. Players may hold more than one non-FIFA nationality.

No.	Pos.	Nation	Player
1	GK	USA	Aubrey Bledsoe
2	FW	USA	Arielle Ship
3	DF	USA	Caprice Dydasco
4	MF	CAN	Quinn (FP)
5	DF	USA	Whitney Church
6	MF	USA	Andi Sullivan
7	DF	USA	Taylor Smith (FP)
8	MF	USA	Megan Dougherty Howard
9	MF	USA	Havana Solaun
10	FW	ARG	Estefanía Banini (INT)
11	FW	USA	Mallory Pugh (FP)

No.	Pos.	Nation	Player
14	FW	NGA	Francisca Ordega (INT)
15	MF	USA	Joanna Lohman
16	MF	USA	Rose Lavelle (FP) (DD)
17	FW	USA	Cali Farquharson
19	GK	USA	Kelsey Wys
21	GK	USA	DiDi Haracic
22	FW	USA	Mallory Eubanks
23	MF	USA	Tori Huster
24	DF	CMR	Estelle Johnson
33	FW	USA	Ashley Hatch
88	FW	USA	Tiffany Weimer (DD)

- (FP) = Federation player
- (DD) = Dispersal draft player
- (INT) = International roster player

=== Team management ===
Head Coach	Jim Gabarra
First Assistant Coach	Briana Scurry
Goalkeeping Coach	Jack Stefanowski
Assistant Coach	Tom Torres
Assistant Coach	Kati Jo Spisak
Director of Sports Science	Kevin Boyle

== Competitions ==
=== Preseason ===
March 10, Sat Preseason	Washington Spirit	1–1	University of North Carolina	Leesburg, Virginia
19:15 EDT (UTC-04)	Eubanks 88'	Report	Andrzejewski 66'	Stadium: Evergreen Sportsplex; Attendance: 2,000

March 17, Sat Preseason	Washington Spirit	0–3	North Carolina Courage	Richmond, Virginia
19:00 EDT (UTC-04)		Report	Erceg 13'; MacDonald 23'; Zerboni (yellow card) 51'; Hamilton 84'	Stadium: City Stadium; Attendance: 6,235

=== Regular season ===
March 24, Sat 1	Seattle Reign	2–1	Washington Spirit	Seattle, Washington
15:30 EDT (UTC-04)	Rapinoe 7' (yellow card) 64'; Taylor 35' (Rapinoe); Andrews (yellow card) 90'	Box; Report	Lohman 68' (Banini)	Stadium: Memorial Stadium; Attendance: 3,561

March 31, Sat 2	Washington Spirit	2–0	Orlando Pride	Boyds, Maryland
15:30 EDT (UTC-04)	Church (yellow card) 44'; Pugh 80' (Hatch); Hatch 88'	Report		Stadium: Maryland SoccerPlex; Attendance: 4,989
Note: Televised on Lifetime.

April 14, Sat 3	Washington Spirit	2–4	North Carolina Courage	Boyds, Maryland
19:00 EDT (UTC-04)	Pugh 3'; Ordega 58' (Solaun); Johnson (yellow card) 84'	Report	Dunn 20' (McDonald); Zerboni 24' (Williams), 48' (Hamilton); Williams 66' (Dunn)	Stadium: Maryland SoccerPlex; Attendance: 3,458; Referee: Jasmine Peralta

April 20, Fri 4	Portland Thorns FC	1–1	Washington Spirit	Portland, Oregon
22:30 EDT (UTC-04)	Sonnett (yellow card) 39'; Sinclair 45+2' (pen.); Horan (yellow card) 88'	Report	Ordega 37'; Bledsoe (yellow card) 86'	Stadium: Providence Park; Attendance: 14,485

April 28, Sat 5	Washington Spirit	1–1	Chicago Red Stars	Boyds, Maryland
19:00 EDT (UTC-04)	Ordega 4' (Pugh)	Report	Mautz 20' (yellow card) 56'; Nagasato (yellow card) 83'; Kerr (yellow card) 90+1'	Stadium: Maryland SoccerPlex; Attendance: 3,448

May 5, Sat 6	Utah Royals FC	2–0	Washington Spirit	Sandy, Utah
21:00 EDT (UTC-04)	O'Hara 7' (Rodriguez); Sauerbrunn (yellow card) 15'; Matheson 66'	Report	Smith (yellow card) 72'	Stadium: Rio Tinto Stadium; Attendance: 7,551

May 12, Sat 7	North Carolina Courage	1–0	Washington Spirit	Cary, North Carolina
19:00 EDT (UTC-04)	Erceg 63' (Hinkle)	Report	Ordega (yellow card) 38'	Stadium: Sahlen's Stadium at WakeMed Soccer Park; Attendance: 5,866

May 19, Sat 8	Washington Spirit	0–1	Portland Thorns FC	Boyds, Maryland
19:00 EDT (UTC-04)		Report	Carpenter 68' (Crnogorčević); Horan (yellow card) 84'	Stadium: Maryland SoccerPlex; Attendance: 3,284

May 23, Wed 9	Washington Spirit	1–0	Sky Blue FC	Boyds, Maryland
19:30 EDT (UTC-04)	Ordega (yellow card) 16'; Hatch 64' (Sullivan)	Report		Stadium: Maryland SoccerPlex; Attendance: 2,433

May 27, Sun 10	Houston Dash	3–2	Washington Spirit	Houston, Texas
18:00 EDT (UTC-04)	Daly 45+1' (Prince), 78' (Kgatlana) (yellow card) 90+2'; Ohai 46'	Report	Dougherty Howard (yellow card) 5'; Ordega (yellow card) 45+2'; Banini; Hatch 90+1'	Stadium: BBVA Compass Stadium; Attendance: 4,045

June 2, Sat 11	Washington Spirit	0–2	Chicago Red Stars	Boyds, Maryland
15:30 EDT (UTC-04)	Lohman (yellow card) 24'	Report	Kerr 25'; Stanton (yellow card) 32'; Nagasato 48' (Mautz); Mautz (yellow card) 75'	Stadium: Maryland SoccerPlex; Attendance: 3,199
Note: Lifetime game but got delayed to 9 pm ET

June 8, Fri 12	Sky Blue FC	0–0	Washington Spirit	Piscataway, New Jersey
19:00 EDT (UTC-04)	Meehan (yellow card) 39'; Killion (yellow card) 67'	Report	Dougherty Howard (yellow card) 50'; Dydasco (yellow card) 88'	Stadium: Yurack Field; Attendance: 2,188

June 16, Sat 13	Washington Spirit	0–0	Seattle Reign	Boyds, Maryland
19:00 EDT (UTC-04)	Quinn (yellow card) 63'; Hatch (yellow card) 90+5'	Report	Addo (yellow card) 47'; Taylor (yellow card) 90+2'	Stadium: Maryland SoccerPlex; Attendance: 3,509

June 23, Sat 14	Washington Spirit	0–1	Orlando Pride	Boyds, Maryland
19:00 EDT (UTC-04)	Kennedy 11'	Report	Dydasco (yellow card) 18'; Dougherty Howard (yellow card) 90+3'	Stadium: Maryland SoccerPlex; Attendance: 4,005
Note: Televised on ESPNews.

July 1, Sun 15	Chicago Red Stars	2–0	Washington Spirit	Bridgeview, Illinois
18:00 EDT (UTC-04)	Short 34' (Colaprico); Nagasato 60' (Kerr); Mautz (yellow card) 65'		Johnson (yellow card) 24'; Hatch (yellow card) 86'	Stadium: Toyota Park; Attendance: 2,858; Referee: Sergii Demianchuk

July 7, Sat 16	Orlando Pride	2–1	Washington Spirit	Orlando Pride
19:30 EDT (UTC-04)	Leroux 45+2' (Kennedy); Marta 86' (Leroux) (yellow card) 90+3'	Report	Hatch 26' (Church)	Stadium: Orlando City Stadium; Attendance: 4,621
Note: Televised on ESPNews.

July 11, Wed 17	North Carolina Courage	2–0	Washington Spirit	Cary, North Carolina
EDT (UTC-04)	Debinha 12'; O'Sullivan (yellow card) 53'; MacDonald 60' (Dunn)	Report		Stadium: Sahlen's Stadium at WakeMed Soccer Park; Attendance: 3,409

July 22, Sun 18	Washington Spirit	0–1	Houston Dash	Boyds, Maryland
10:00 EDT (UTC-04)		Report	Daly 3' (Huerta)	Stadium: Maryland SoccerPlex; Attendance: 3,623
Note: Game was originally scheduled for July 21, was rescheduled due to poor weather conditions

August 5, Sun 19	Seattle Reign	2–0	Washington Spirit	Seattle, Washington
21:00 EDT (UTC-04)	Spencer 44' (Long); Taylor 71' (Rapinoe); Oyster (yellow card) 84'	Report		Stadium: Memorial Stadium; Attendance: 3,704

August 8, Wed 20	Utah Royals FC	1–0	Washington Spirit	Sandy, Utah
22:00 EDT (UTC-04)	Stengel 74' (Lytle)	Report		Stadium: Rio Tinto Stadium; Attendance: 8,154

August 17, Fri 21	Houston Dash	4–0	Washington Spirit	Houston, Texas
20:30 EDT (UTC-04)	Ohai 41' (Daly); Huerta 58' (Comeau), 76' (Daly); Simon 84' (Latsko)	Report		Stadium: BBVA Compass Stadium; Attendance: 3,007

August 22, Wed 22	Washington Spirit	0–1	Utah Royals FC	Boyds, Maryland
19:30 EDT (UTC-04)		Report	Rodriguez 12'; Corsie (yellow card) 17'	Stadium: Maryland SoccerPlex; Attendance: 3,318

August 25, Sat 23	Washington Spirit	0–1	Portland Thorns FC	Washington, D.C.
20:00 EDT (UTC-04)	Church (yellow card) 40'	Report	Heath 15' (Raso)	Stadium: Audi Field; Attendance: 7,976; Referee: Katja Koroleva
Note: Televised on ESPNews.

September 1, Sat 24	Washington Spirit	1–1	Sky Blue FC	Boyds, Maryland
19:00 EDT (UTC-04)	Ship 71'	Report	Killion (yellow card) 58' (goal) 87' (Tiernan)	Stadium: Maryland SoccerPlex; Attendance: 3,462
Note: Game was postponed until September 2 at 10 a.m. (ET) due to lightning.

==== Regular-season standings ====
Pos	Team	Pld	W	D	L	GF	GA	GD	Pts	
1	North Carolina Courage (C)	24	17	6	1	53	17	+36	57	NWSL Shield
2	Portland Thorns FC	24	12	6	6	40	28	+12	42	NWSL Playoffs
3	Seattle Reign FC	24	11	8	5	27	19	+8	41	NWSL Playoffs
4	Chicago Red Stars	24	9	10	5	38	28	+10	37	NWSL Playoffs
5	Utah Royals FC	24	9	8	7	22	23	−1	35	
6	Houston Dash	24	9	5	10	35	39	−4	32	
7	Orlando Pride	24	8	6	10	30	37	−7	30	
8	Washington Spirit	24	2	5	17	12	35	−23	11	
9	Sky Blue FC	24	1	6	17	21	52	−31	9	

Source: NWSL
Rules for classification: Tiebreakers
(C) Champions

==== Results summary ====
Overall								Home						Away					
Pld	W	D	L	GF	GA	GD	Pts	W	D	L	GF	GA	GD	W	D	L	GF	GA	GD
24	2	5	17	12	35	−23	11	2	3	7	7	13	−6	0	2	10	5	22	−17

Last updated: September 2, 2018.
Source: Match reports

==== Results by round ====
Round	1	2	3	4	5	6	7	8	9	10	11	12	13	14	15	16	17	18	19	20	21	22	23	24
Stadium	A	H	H	A	H	A	A	H	H	A	H	A	H	H	A	A	A	H	A	A	A	H	H	H
Result	L	W	L	D	D	L	L	L	W	L	L	D	D	L	L	L	L	L	L	L	L	L	L	D
Position (Note: Washington Spirit's position in the league at the end of match day)	8	3	5	5	5	8	8	8	8	8	8	8	8	8	8	8	8	8	8	8	8	8	8	8

Updated to match(es) played on September 2, 2018. Source: Match reports
A = Away; H = Home; W = Win; D = Draw; L = Loss

=== NWSL Playoffs ===
The Spirit were eliminated from playoff contention on July 22 after a 1–0 home loss to Houston Dash.

== Statistics ==
=== Appearances and goals ===
As of September 3, 2018

No.	Pos	Nat	Player	Total		NWSL	
No.	Pos	Nat	Player	Apps	Goals	Apps	Goals
Defenders:
3	DF	(United States) USA	Caprice Dydasco	24	0	21+3	0
5	DF	(United States) USA	Whitney Church	22	0	21+1	0
7	DF	(United States) USA	Taylor Smith	23	0	23	0
13	DF	(United States) USA	Megan Crosson	1	0	1	0
24	DF	(Cameroon) CMR	Estelle Johnson	21	0	21	0
31	DF	(United States) USA	Zoe Clark	1	0	1	0
Midfielders:
4	MF	(Canada) CAN	Quinn	17	0	16+1	0
6	MF	(United States) USA	Andi Sullivan	23	0	22+1	0
9	MF	(United States) USA	Havana Solaun	13	0	5+8	0
12	MF	(United States) USA	Morgan Proffitt	4	0	2+2	0
15	MF	(United States) USA	Joanna Lohman	13	1	4+9	1
16	MF	(United States) USA	Rose Lavelle	11	0	5+6	0
18	MF	(United States) USA	Alexa Newfield	1	0	1	0
19	MF	(United States) USA	Megan Dougherty Howard	23	0	14+9	0
23	MF	(United States) USA	Tori Huster	17	0	15+2	0
Forwards:
2	FW	(United States) USA	Arielle Ship	2	1	0+2	1
8	FW	(United States) USA	Mallory Eubanks	12	0	5+7	0
10	FW	(Argentina) ARG	Estefania Banini	12	1	11+1	1
11	FW	(United States) USA	Mallory Pugh	15	2	13+2	2
14	FW	(Nigeria) NGA	Francisca Ordega	18	3	15+3	3
17	FW	(United States) USA	Cali Farquharson	5	0	1+4	0
27	FW	(Chile) CHI	Yanara Aedo	0	0	0	0
33	FW	(United States) USA	Ashley Hatch	22	4	22	4
36	FW	(United States) USA	Tiffany McCarty	1	0	1	0
88	FW	(United States) USA	Tiffany Weimer	3	0	1+2	0

Italics indicates player left team midway through season.

=== Goalkeepers ===
No.	Nat	Player	National Women's Soccer League								
No.	Nat	Player	GP	GS	MIN	W	L	D	GA	GAA	CS
1	(United States)	Aubrey Bledsoe	21	21	1890	2	12	5	30	1.43	4
19	(United States)	Kelsey Wys	1	1	90	0	1	0	2	2.00	0
21	(Bosnia and Herzegovina)	DiDi Haracic	2	2	180	0	2	0	3	1.50	0

== Honors and awards ==
=== NWSL Yearly Awards ===
Award	Result	Player	Ref
Rookie of the Year	Nominated	(United States) Andi Sullivan	
Goalkeeper of the Year	Nominated	(United States) Aubrey Bledsoe	

=== NWSL Team of the Month ===
Month	Goalkeeper	Defenders	Midfielders	Forwards	Ref.
March				(United States) Mallory Pugh	
April	(United States) Aubrey Bledsoe	(Cameroon) Estelle Johnson		(Nigeria) Francisca Ordega (United States) Mallory Pugh	

=== NWSL Weekly Awards ===
==== NWSL Player of the Week ====
Week	Result	Player	Ref
2	Won	(United States) Mallory Pugh	
11/12	Won	(United States) Aubrey Bledsoe	

==== NWSL Goal of the Week ====
Week	Result	Player	Ref.
1	Nominated	(United States) Joanna Lohman	
2	Nominated	(United States) Mallory Pugh	
3	Nominated	(United States) Mallory Pugh	

==== NWSL Save of the Week ====
Week	Result	Player	Ref.
1	Nominated	(United States) Aubrey Bledsoe	
2	Nominated	(United States) Aubrey Bledsoe	
3	Nominated	(United States) Aubrey Bledsoe	
4	Won	(United States) Aubrey Bledsoe	
5	Won	(United States) Aubrey Bledsoe	
11/12	Nominated	(United States) Aubrey Bledsoe	
15	Nominated	(United States) Aubrey Bledsoe	
16	Nominated	(United States) Aubrey Bledsoe	
22	Nominated	(United States) DiDi Haracic	
24	Nominated	(United States) Aubrey Bledsoe	

== Transfers ==
=== In ===
Date	Player	Number	Position	Previous club	Fee/notes
January 16, 2018	(United States) Ashley Hatch	33	FW	(United States) North Carolina Courage	Trade with Smith for Dunn's rights
January 16, 2018	(United States) Taylor Smith	7	DF	(United States) North Carolina Courage	Trade with Hatch for Dunn's rights
January 23, 2018	(United States) Aubrey Bledsoe	1	GK	(United States) Orlando Pride	Trade for Zadorsky and 2019 1st round draft pick
January 30, 2018	(United States) Rose Lavelle	16	MF	(United States) Boston Breakers	2018 Dispersal Draft, 1st overall
January 30, 2018	(United States) Tiffany Weimer	–	FW	(United States) Boston Breakers	2018 Dispersal Draft, 20th overall
March 21, 2018	(United States) Tiffany Weimer	88	FW	(United States) Houston Dash	Signed off waivers
March 29, 2018	(United States) Mallory Eubanks	22	FW	(United States) Mississippi State University	Signed via National Team Player Replacement for Banini, signed to full contract on May 17
June 29, 2018	(United States) Maddie Huster	25	MF	(United States) Wake Forest University	Signed, was a 2018 College Draft Pick
August 30, 2018	(United States) Megan Crosson	13	DF	(Spain) UD Granadilla Tenerife	Signed, National Team replacement
August 30, 2018	(United States) Brenna Connell	34	MF	(United States) Washington Spirit Reserves	Signed, National Team replacement
August 30, 2018	(United States) Zoe Clark	31	DF	(United States) Maryland Terrapins	Signed, National Team replacement
August 30, 2018	(United States) Tiffay McCarty	36	FW	(United States) Florida State Seminoles	Signed, National Team replacement
August 30, 2018	(United States) Alexa Newfield	18	FW	(United States) Utah Royals FC	Signed, National Team replacement
August 30, 2018	(United States) Morgan Ruhl	38	GK	(United States) LSU Tigers	Signed, National Team replacement

=== Out ===
Date	Player	Number	Position	New club	Fee/notes
October 23, 2017	(Denmark) Line Jensen	7	FW		Waived
January 16, 2018	(Canada) Lindsay Agnew	8	FW	(United States) Houston Dash	Traded for 2018 3rd overall draft pick
January 23, 2018	(Canada) Shelina Zadorsky	4	DF	(United States) Orlando Pride	Trade for Zadorsky and 2019 1st round draft pick
February 2, 2018	(United States) Alyssa Kleiner	22	DF		Waived
February 12, 2018	(United States) Kassey Kallman	6	DF		Retired
February 13, 2018	(United States) Tiffany Weimer	–	FW	(United States) Houston Dash	Trade for 2019 4th round draft pick
February 14, 2018	(Canada) Stephanie Labbé	1	GK		Released rights
February 24, 2018	(United States) Cheyna Matthews	20	FW		Out for 2018 season; pregnancy
March 19, 2018	(United States) Schuyler DeBree	13	FW		Waived, rights retained
March 19, 2018	(United States) Elizabeth Wenger	18	DF		Waived, rights retained
March 19, 2018	(United States) Mallory Eubanks	22	FW		Waived, rights retained
March 19, 2018	(United States) Maddie Huster	25	MF		Waived, rights retained
March 19, 2018	(United States) Brittany Basinger	28	DF		Waived, rights retained
March 19, 2018	(United States) Rachel Moore	32	FW		Waived, rights retained
June 19, 2018	(United States) Morgan Proffitt	12	MF	(Czech Republic) SK Slavia Praha	Waived. Signed with SK Slavia Praha
June 21, 2018	(Chile) Yanara Aedo	27	FW	(Spain) Valencia CF Femenino	Waived. Signed with Valencia CF Femenino
July 25, 2018	(United States) Maddie Huster	25	MF		Waived.

=== Draft picks ===
Draft picks are not automatically signed to the team roster. Only those who are signed to a contract will be listed as transfers in. Only trades involving draft picks and executed during the 2018 NWSL College Draft will be listed in the notes.

Player	Pos	Previous club	Notes	Ref
(United States) Andi Sullivan	MF	(United States) Stanford University	Round 1, Pick 1 (1st overall)	
(Canada) Quinn	MF	(United States) Duke University	Round 1, Pick 3 (3rd overall)	
(United States) Schuyler DeBree	DF	(United States) Duke University	Round 2, Pick 1 (11th overall)	
(United States) Mallory Eubanks	FW	(United States) Mississippi State University	Round 2, Pick 6 (16th overall)	
(United States) Elizabeth Wenger	DF	(United States) Georgetown University	Round 2, Pick 7 (17th overall) (via 2018 Dispersal Draft, 17th overall)	
(United States) Brittany Basinger	DF	(United States) Penn State University	Round 3, Pick 1 (21st overall)	
(United States) Maddie Huster	MF	(United States) Wake Forest University	Round 3, Pick 6 (26th overall)	
(United States) Rachel Moore	MF	(United States) College of William & Mary	Round 4, Pick 1 (31st overall)	
