= 2017 Washington Spirit season =

Washington Spirit
2017 season
- General manager: Chris Hummer
- Head coach: Jim Gabarra
- Stadium: Maryland SoccerPlex
- NWSL: 10th
- Top goalscorer: Mallory Pugh (6)
- Highest home attendance: 5,200 (July 8 vs. Orlando)
- Lowest home attendance: 2,365 (Aug 30 vs. North Carolina)
- Average home league attendance: 3,491
| Home colors | Away colors | Third colors |

The 2017 season is Washington Spirit's fifth season, competing in the National Women's Soccer League, the top division of women's soccer in the United States.

== Review ==
In the aftermath of finishing 2016 runners-up, the Spirit saw a series of key departures including captain Ali Krieger (traded to Orlando Pride), Christine Nairn and Diana Matheson (both traded to Seattle Reign), and Crystal Dunn leaving for Chelsea, while retaining her contracting rights. In addition to the departures, key injuries to Joanna Lohman, Francisca Ordega, and goalkeeper Kelsey Wys limited the Spirit's playing options.

Unable to adequately replace these players, the Spirit struggled to compete throughout the 2017 season ultimately finishing last (10th) for the first time since the inaugural season. However, building for the future, Gabarra was able to recruit U.S. national team prospect, Mallory Pugh midseason. Pugh would go on to lead the team in scoring, registering 6 goals in 16 games.

== Club ==
=== Roster ===
The first-team roster of Washington Spirit.

Note: Flags indicate national team as defined under FIFA eligibility rules; some limited exceptions apply. Players may hold more than one non-FIFA nationality.

| No. | Pos. | Nation | Player |
|---|---|---|---|
| 1 | GK | CAN | Stephanie Labbé (FP) |
| 2 | FW | USA | Arielle Ship |
| 3 | DF | USA | Caprice Dydasco |
| 4 | DF | CAN | Shelina Zadorsky (FP) |
| 5 | DF | USA | Whitney Church |
| 6 | DF | USA | Kassey Kallman |
| 7 | MF | DEN | Line Sigvardsen Jensen |
| 8 | FW | CAN | Lindsay Agnew |
| 9 | MF | JAM | Havana Solaun |
| 10 | FW | ARG | Estefanía Banini |
| 11 | FW | USA | Mallory Pugh (FP) |
| 12 | MF | USA | Morgan Proffitt |

| No. | Pos. | Nation | Player |
|---|---|---|---|
| 14 | FW | NGR | Francisca Ordega |
| 15 | MF | USA | Joanna Lohman |
| 17 | FW | USA | Cali Farquharson |
| 18 | GK | USA | Kelsey Wys |
| 20 | FW | JAM | Cheyna Williams |
| 21 | GK | BIH | DiDi Haracic |
| 22 | DF | USA | Alyssa Kleiner |
| 23 | MF | USA | Tori Huster |
| 24 | DF | CMR | Estelle Johnson |
| 27 | FW | CHI | Yanara Aedo |
| 29 | MF | USA | Megan Dougherty Howard |

- (FP) = Federation player

=== Team management ===
| Owner | Bill Lynch |
| General Manager | Jim Gabarra |
| Head Coach | Jim Gabarra |

== Competitions ==
=== Preseason ===
On February 2, the Washington Spirit announced its preseason schedule.

| March 18, Sat | Washington Spirit | 3–0 | Penn State University | Boyds, Maryland |
| 14:00 EDT (UTC-04) | Stengel 34'; Mewis 43', 53' | | | Stadium: Maryland Soccerplex; Attendance: 300 |
Note: Played in three 30-minute periods.

| March 25, Sat | Washington Spirit | 5–0 | University of North Carolina | Leesburg, Virginia |
| 18:30 EDT (UTC-04) | Sigvardsen Jensen 35' (yellow card) 58'; Stengel 49'; Williams 52'; Mewis 81'; Agnew 89' | | | Stadium: Evergreen Sportsplex; Attendance: 2,000 |

| April 1, Sat | Washington Spirit | 4–3 | Duke University | Boyds, Maryland |
| 14:00 EDT (UTC-04) | Stengel 23', 59'; Dougherty Howard 37'; Williams 52' | | Dorsey 27', 44'; McCoy 41' | Stadium: Maryland Soccerplex |

| April 8, Sat | Washington Spirit | 2–0 | University of Virginia | Boyds, Maryland |
| 19:00 EDT (UTC-04) | Mewis 21'; Lohman 65' | | | Stadium: Maryland Soccerplex |

=== Regular season ===
| Sat Apr 15 1 | Washington Spirit | 0–1 | North Carolina Courage | Boyds, Maryland |
| 3:00 p.m. | Mewis (yellow card) 28'; Zardorsky (yellow card) 82' | | Zerboni 18' (yellow card) 70' | Stadium: Maryland SoccerPlex; Attendance: 2,407 |

| Sat Apr 22 2 | Orlando Pride | 1–1 | Washington Spirit | Orlando, Florida |
| 4:00 p.m. | Jensen 60'; Kallman (yellow card) 65'; Huster (yellow card) 75' | Report; Box Score | Alleway (yellow card) 59'; Evans 86' | Stadium: Orlando City Stadium; Attendance: 14,452; Referee: Karen Abt |

| Sat Apr 29 3 | Washington Spirit | 0–1 | Houston Dash | Boyds, Maryland |
| 7:00 p.m. | | Report; Box Score | Ohai 28'; Benites (yellow card) 59' | Stadium: Maryland SoccerPlex; Attendance: 3,154; Referee: Christina Unkel |

| Sat May 6 4 | Washington Spirit | 4–3 | Sky Blue FC | Boyds, Maryland |
| 7:00 p.m. | Ordega 6', 56'; Simon 26' (o.g.); Solaun 34'; Williams (yellow card) 87' | Report; Box Score | O'Hara 12'; Simon (yellow card) 39'; Killion 50', 71' (pen.) | Stadium: Maryland SoccerPlex; Attendance: 3,190 |

| Sat May 13 5 | Seattle Reign FC | 6–2 | Washington Spirit | Seattle, Washington |
| 4:00 p.m. | Christine Nairn 20'; Yanez 35'; Kawasumi 69'; Rapinoe 71' (pen.), 76'; Elston 79' | Report; Box Score | Solaun 60'; Mewis 88' | Stadium: Memorial Stadium; Attendance: 3,007; Referee: Victor Rivas |

| Sat May 20 6 | Washington Spirit | 0–1 | FC Kansas City | Boyds, Maryland |
| 7:00 p.m. | Ordega (yellow card) 84' | Report; Box Score | Newfield 39'; Saurbrunn (yellow card) 48' | Stadium: Maryland SoccerPlex; Attendance: 3,714 |

| Sat May 27 7 | FC Kansas City | 3–2 | Washington Spirit | Kansas City, Missouri |
| 8:00 p.m. | Leroux 9', 27'; Newfield (yellow card) 15' (yellow-red card) 70'; Sauerbrunn 60'; Taylor (yellow card) 89' | Report; Box Score | Mewis 5'; Dougherty Howard (yellow card) 39'; Solaun 83'; Ordega (yellow card) 86' | Stadium: Swope Soccer Village; Attendance: 1,728 |

| Sat June 3 8 | Washington Spirit | 2–0 | Houston Dash | Boyds, Maryland |
| 7:00 p.m. | Williams 3'; Pugh 69' | Report; Box Score | Brooks (yellow card) 63' | Stadium: Maryland SoccerPlex; Attendance: 3,096 |

| Sat June 17 9 | Chicago Red Stars | 1–1 | Washington Spirit | Bridgeview, Illinois |
| 2:50 p.m. | Naughton (yellow card) 31'; Press 82' (penalty) | Report; Box Score | Ordega 42' (Williams); Howard (yellow card) 62'; Zadorsky (yellow card) 81' | Stadium: Toyota Park; Attendance: 3,189; Referee: Christopher Greer; Assistant referees: Joshua Haimes, Gjovalin Bori; Fourth official: Jeffrey Swartzel |

| Sat June 24 10 | Washington Spirit | 1–0 | Portland Thorns FC | Boyds, Maryland |
| 4:00 p.m. | Ordega 19' | Report; Box Score | | Stadium: Maryland SoccerPlex; Attendance: 4,319 |

| Sat July 1 11 | Boston Breakers | 1–0 | Washington Spirit | Boston, Massachusetts |
| 4:00 p.m. | Chapman (yellow card) 62'; Purce 72' (White) | Report | Johnson (yellow card) 64' | Stadium: Jordan Field; Attendance: 2,523; Referee: Elvis Osmanovic |

| Sat July 8 12 | Washington Spirit | 2–2 | Orlando Pride | Boyds, Maryland |
| 4:00 p.m. | Pugh 24' (Ordega), 90' (pen.) | Report | Marta 10', 56' (pen.) | Stadium: Maryland SoccerPlex; Attendance: 5,200 |

| Sat July 15 13 | Houston Dash | 2–1 | Washington Spirit | Houston, Texas |
| 8:30 p.m. | Poliana 25' (Beckie); Andressinha 53' (Daly); Van Wyk (yellow card) 59' | Report | Johnson 75' (Solaun) | Stadium: BBVA Compass Stadium; Attendance: 3,332 |

| Sat July 22 14 | Portland Thorns FC | 2–1 | Washington Spirit | Portland, Oregon |
| 10:00 p.m. | Sykes (yellow card) 30'; Long 62'; Weber 80' | Report; Box Score | Ship (yellow card) 12'; Solaun 58'; Dydasco (yellow card) 72' | Stadium: Providence Park; Attendance: 18,478 |

| Fri August 4 15 | Sky Blue FC | 1–4 | Washington Spirit | Piscataway, New Jersey |
| 7:00 p.m. | Hayes 2' | Report; Box Score | Ship 51'; Church (yellow card) 57'; Williams 61'; Howard 73'; Solaun 87' | Stadium: Yurcak Field; Attendance: 2,496 |

| Tue August 8 16 | Orlando Pride | 3–0 | Washington Spirit | Orlando, Florida |
| 7:00 p.m. | Evans (yellow card) 45'; Marta 52'; Pereira 57'; Umogagu (yellow card) 62'; Morgan 64' | Report; Box Score | | Stadium: Orlando City Stadium; Attendance: 4,273; Referee: Christina Unkel |

| Sat August 12 17 | Washington Spirit | 2–2 | Boston Breakers | Boyds, Maryland |
| 4:00 p.m. | Johnson 6'; Williams 64' | Report | Leon 44' 79'; Salem (yellow card) 90+5' | Stadium: Maryland SoccerPlex; Attendance: 3,722; Referee: (United States) Danielle Chesky |

| Sat August 19 18 | North Carolina Courage | 2–0 | Washington Spirit | Cary, North Carolina |
| 4:00 p.m. | Hatch 46'; Kallman 84' (o.g.); Dahlkemper (yellow card) 90+2' | Report | Dydasco (yellow card) 55'; Farquharson (yellow card) 83' | Stadium: WakeMed Soccer Park; Attendance: 3,530; Referee: (United States) Elvis Osmanovic |

| Sat August 26 19 | Washington Spirit | 1–2 | Chicago Red Stars | Boyds, Maryland |
| 7:00 p.m. | Williams 81'; Johnson (yellow card) 90+3' | Report | Kristen Mavis 23'; Mautz (yellow card) 66'; Colaprico (yellow card) 70'; Press 87' | Stadium: Maryland SoccerPlex; Attendance: 3,469; Referee: (United States) Kevin Broadley |

| Wed August 30 20 | Washington Spirit | 2–3 | North Carolina Courage | Boyds, Maryland |
| 7:30 p.m. | Banini 8'; Farquharson (yellow card) 23'; Huster (yellow card) 45'; Williams 73' | Report | Mewis 45+1'; McDonald 61' 66' | Stadium: Maryland SoccerPlex; Attendance: 2,365; Referee: (United States) Amber O'Connor |

| Sat September 2 21 | Portland Thorns FC | 4–0 | Washington Spirit | Portland, Oregon |
| 4:30 p.m. | Nadim 22'; Sinclair 25' 81'; Reynolds (yellow card) 36'; Sonnett 40' | Report | Haracic (yellow card) 21' | Stadium: Providence Park; Attendance: 19,141; Referee: (United States) Ekaterina Koroleva |

| Sun September 10 22 | Sky Blue FC | 1–2 | Washington Spirit | Piscataway, New Jersey |
| 6:00 p.m. | Hayes 43' | Report | Church 75'; Pugh 85' | Stadium: Yurcak Field; Attendance: 2,008; Referee: (United States) Becky Pagan |

| Sat September 23 23 | Washington Spirit | 0–3 | Boston Breakers | Boyds, Maryland |
| 7:00 p.m. | | Report; Box Score | Dowie 47'; Kallman 54' (o.g.); Leon 55'; Frisbie (yellow card) 69'; White (yellow card) 77' | Stadium: Maryland SoccerPlex; Attendance: 3,475; Referee: Luis Guardia |

| Sat September 30 24 | Washington Spirit | 2–3 | Seattle Reign FC | Boyds, Maryland |
| 7:00 p.m. | Pugh 27', 32' | Report; Box Score | Fishlock 71', 90'; Crummer 83' | Stadium: Maryland SoccerPlex; Attendance: 3,780; Referee: Danielle Chesky |

==== Regular-season standings ====
| Pos | Team | Pld | W | D | L | GF | GA | GD | Pts | Qualification |
|---|---|---|---|---|---|---|---|---|---|---|
| 1 | North Carolina Courage | 24 | 16 | 1 | 7 | 38 | 22 | +16 | 49 | NWSL Shield |
| 2 | Portland Thorns FC (C) | 24 | 14 | 5 | 5 | 37 | 20 | +17 | 47 | NWSL Playoffs |
| 3 | Orlando Pride | 24 | 11 | 7 | 6 | 45 | 31 | +14 | 40 | NWSL Playoffs |
| 4 | Chicago Red Stars | 24 | 11 | 6 | 7 | 33 | 30 | +3 | 39 | NWSL Playoffs |
| 5 | Seattle Reign FC | 24 | 9 | 7 | 8 | 43 | 37 | +6 | 34 | |
| 6 | Sky Blue FC | 24 | 10 | 3 | 11 | 42 | 51 | −9 | 33 | |
| 7 | FC Kansas City | 24 | 8 | 7 | 9 | 29 | 31 | −2 | 31 | |
| 8 | Houston Dash | 24 | 7 | 3 | 14 | 23 | 39 | −16 | 24 | |
| 9 | Boston Breakers | 24 | 4 | 7 | 13 | 24 | 35 | −11 | 19 | |
| 10 | Washington Spirit | 24 | 5 | 4 | 15 | 30 | 48 | −18 | 19 | |

Source: NWSL
Rules for classification: Tiebreakers
(C) Champions

== Results summary ==
| Overall | | | | | | | | Home | | | | | | Away | | | | | |
| Pld | W | D | L | GF | GA | GD | Pts | W | D | L | GF | GA | GD | W | D | L | GF | GA | GD |
|---|---|---|---|---|---|---|---|---|---|---|---|---|---|---|---|---|---|---|---|
| 24 | 5 | 4 | 15 | 30 | 48 | −18 | 19 | 3 | 2 | 7 | 16 | 21 | −5 | 2 | 2 | 8 | 14 | 27 | −13 |

Last updated: October 1, 2017.
Source: Match reports

== Results by round ==
| Round | 1 | 2 | 3 | 4 | 5 | 6 | 7 | 8 | 9 | 10 | 11 | 12 | 13 | 14 | 15 | 16 | 17 | 18 | 19 | 20 | 21 | 22 | 23 | 24 |
|---|---|---|---|---|---|---|---|---|---|---|---|---|---|---|---|---|---|---|---|---|---|---|---|---|
| Stadium | H | A | H | H | A | H | A | H | A | H | A | H | A | A | A | A | H | A | H | H | A | A | H | H |
| Result | L | D | L | W | L | L | L | W | D | W | L | D | L | L | W | L | D | L | L | L | L | W | L | L |
| Position (Note: Washington Spirit's position in the league at the end of match day) | 7 | 8 | 9 | 7 | 10 | 10 | 10 | 9 | 8 | 8 | 10 | 10 | 10 | 10 | 9 | 10 | 10 | 10 | 10 | 10 | 10 | 9 | 10 | 10 |

Updated to match(es) played on October 1, 2017. Source: Match reports
A = Away; H = Home; W = Win; D = Draw; L = Loss

=== Postseason playoff ===
The Spirit struggled to gain any momentum during the 2017 season and were the first team to be eliminated from playoff contention after a home loss to the Chicago Red Stars on August 26 (Week 19).

== Squad statistics ==
Squad statistics are of regular season only

=== Appearances and goals ===
As of October 1, 2017

| No. | Pos | Nat | Player | Total | | NWSL | |
| No. | Pos | Nat | Player | Apps | Goals | Apps | Goals |
|---|---|---|---|---|---|---|---|
Defenders:
| 3 | DF | (United States) USA | Caprice Dydasco | 16 | 0 | 16 | 0 |
| 4 | DF | (Canada) CAN | Shelina Zadorsky | 21 | 0 | 21 | 0 |
| 5 | DF | (United States) USA | Whitney Church | 22 | 1 | 22 | 1 |
| 6 | DF | (United States) USA | Kassey Kallman | 17 | 0 | 17 | 0 |
| 12 | DF | (United States) USA | Morgan Proffitt | 3 | 0 | 3 | 0 |
| 22 | DF | (United States) USA | Alyssa Kleiner | 18 | 0 | 18 | 0 |
Midfielders:
| 9 | MF | (Jamaica) JAM | Havana Solaun | 24 | 5 | 24 | 5 |
| 10 | MF | (Argentina) ARG | Estefania Banini | 9 | 1 | 9 | 1 |
| 15 | MF | (United States) USA | Joanna Lohman | 1 | 0 | 1 | 0 |
| 16 | MF | (United States) USA | Cameron Castleberry | 2 | 0 | 2 | 0 |
| 19 | MF | (United States) USA | Kristie Mewis | 8 | 2 | 8 | 2 |
| 23 | MF | (United States) USA | Tori Huster | 20 | 0 | 20 | 0 |
| 24 | MF | (Cameroon) CMR | Estelle Johnson | 20 | 2 | 20 | 2 |
| 29 | MF | (United States) USA | Megan Dougherty Howard | 23 | 1 | 23 | 1 |
Forwards:
| 2 | FW | (United States) USA | Arielle Ship | 14 | 1 | 14 | 1 |
| 7 | FW | (Denmark) DEN | Line Jensen | 9 | 1 | 9 | 1 |
| 8 | FW | (Canada) CAN | Lindsay Agnew | 8 | 0 | 8 | 0 |
| 11 | FW | (United States) USA | Mallory Pugh | 16 | 6 | 16 | 6 |
| 12 | FW | (United States) USA | Katie Stengel | 5 | 0 | 5 | 0 |
| 13 | FW | (United States) USA | Crystal Thomas | 1 | 0 | 1 | 0 |
| 14 | FW | (Nigeria) NGR | Francisca Ordega | 14 | 4 | 14 | 4 |
| 17 | FW | (United States) USA | Cali Farquharson | 10 | 0 | 10 | 0 |
| 20 | FW | (Jamaica) JAM | Cheyna Williams | 21 | 5 | 21 | 5 |
| 27 | FW | (Chile) CHI | Yanara Aedo | 0 | 0 | 0 | 0 |

Italics indicates player left team midway through season.

=== Goalkeeper Stats ===
Last updated: October 1, 2017

| No. | Nat | Player | National Women's Soccer League | | | | | | | | |
| No. | Nat | Player | GP | GS | MIN | W | L | D | GA | GAA | CS |
| 1 | (Canada) | Stephanie Labbe | 17 | 17 | 1530 | 4 | 10 | 3 | 30 | 1.76 | 2 |
| 18 | (United States) | Kelsey Wys | 0 | 0 | 0 | 0 | 0 | 0 | 0 | 0.00 | 0 |
| 21 | (Bosnia and Herzegovina) | DiDi Haracic | 7 | 7 | 630 | 1 | 5 | 1 | 18 | 2.57 | 0 |

== Transfers ==
=== In ===
| Date | Player | Number | Position | Previous club | Fee/notes |
|---|---|---|---|---|---|
| November 17, 2016 | (United States) Kristie Mewis | 19 | MF | (United States) Boston Breakers | Trade |
| November 17, 2016 | (United States) Kassey Kallman | 6 | DF | (United States) Boston Breakers | Trade |
| December 21, 2016 | (Jamaica) Havana Solaun | 9 | MF | (United States) Seattle Reign FC | Trade for Rights, Signed |
| February 10, 2017 | (Bosnia and Herzegovina) DiDi Haracic | 21 | GK | (United States) Washington Spirit Reserves | Signed |
| March 10, 2017 | (Canada) Lindsay Agnew | 8 | FW | (United States) Ohio State | 2017 Draft Pick |
| March 10, 2017 | (United States) Megan Dougherty Howard | 29 | MF | (United States) Florida | 2017 Draft Pick |
| April 5, 2017 | (United States) Arielle Ship | 2 | FW | (United States) California | 2017 Draft Pick |
| April 5, 2017 | (United States) Cameron Castleberry | 16 | MF | (United States) North Carolina | 2017 Draft Pick |
| April 27, 2017 | (United States) Crystal Thomas | 13 | FW | (United States) Georgetown University | Signed |
| May 13, 2017 | (United States) Mallory Pugh | 11 | FW | (United States) UCLA | Signed via Distribution Ranking Order |
| June 19, 2017 | (Argentina) Estefanía Banini | 10 | FW | (Spain) Valencia Féminas CF | Signed pending international transfer certificate |
| June 27, 2017 | (Chile) Yanara Aedo | 27 | FW | (Spain) Valencia Féminas CF | Signed pending international transfer certificate |
| August 23, 2017 | (United States) Morgan Proffitt | 12 | MF | (United States) Chicago Red Stars | Signed after waived |

=== Out ===
| Date | Player | Number | Position | New club | Fee/notes |
|---|---|---|---|---|---|
| October 18, 2016 | (Argentina) Estefanía Banini | 10 | MF | (Spain) Valencia Féminas CF | Free |
| October 19, 2016 | (Spain) Laura del Rio | 57 | FW | | Waived |
| November 2, 2016 | (United States) Ali Krieger | 11 | DF | (United States) Orlando Pride | Trade |
| November 17, 2016 | (United States) Megan Oyster | 4 | DF | (United States) Boston Breakers | Trade |
| April 22, 2016 | (United States) Christine Nairn | 7 | MF | (United States) Seattle Reign FC | Trade |
| January 2, 2017 | (United States) Crystal Dunn | 19 | FW | (England) Chelsea L.F.C. | Free |
| January 23, 2017 | (Canada) Diana Matheson | 8 | MF | (United States) Seattle Reign FC | Trade |
| May 19, 2017 | (United States) Crystal Thomas | 13 | FW | | Waived |
| June 28, 2017 | (United States) Katie Stengel | 12 | FW | (United States) Boston Breakers | Waived |
| June 28, 2017 | (United States) Cameron Castleberry | 16 | MF | | Waived |
| August 21, 2017 | (United States) Kristie Mewis | 19 | FW | (United States) Chicago Red Stars | Trade for 2018 First round draft pick |

== Honors and awards ==
=== NWSL Team of the Month ===
| Month | Goalkeeper | Defenders | Midfielders | Forwards | Ref. |
|---|---|---|---|---|---|
| April | (Canada) Stephanie Labbé | (Cameroon) Estelle Johnson | | | |
| June | (Canada) Stephanie Labbé | (Cameroon) Estelle Johnson | | | |

=== NWSL Weekly Awards ===
==== NWSL Player of the Week ====
| Week | Result | Player | Ref. |
|---|---|---|---|
| 4 | Won | (Nigeria) Francisca Ordega | |
| 15 | Won | (United States) Arielle Ship | |
| 20 | Won | (United States) Whitney Church | |

==== NWSL Save of the Week ====
| Week | Result | Player | Ref. |
|---|---|---|---|
| 11 | Won | (Canada) Stephanie Labbé | |
| 20 | Won | (United States) DiDi Haracic (United States) Whitney Church | |

== See also ==
- 2017 National Women's Soccer League season
