= 2017 National Women's Soccer League season =

5th season of the National Women's Soccer League

National Women's Soccer League
- Season: 2017
- Dates: April 15–October 14
- Champions: Portland Thorns FC
- NWSL Shield: North Carolina Courage
- Matches: 120
- Goals: 344 (2.87 per match)
- Top goalscorer: Sam Kerr (17 goals)
- Biggest home win: ORL 5–0 SKY (Aug 12)
- Biggest away win: HOU 0–4 NC (Sep 27)
- Highest scoring: SEA 5–4 SKY (Jul 22); SKY 5–4 SEA (Aug 19)
- Longest winning run: 5 games North Carolina Courage (Aug 5 – Aug 30); Orlando Pride (Aug 8 – Sep 2)
- Longest unbeaten run: 9 games Orlando Pride (Aug 8 – Sep 30)
- Longest winless run: 10 games Boston Breakers (Jul 7 – Sep 10)
- Longest losing run: 6 games Houston Dash (May 6 – Jun 17)
- Highest attendance: 21,144; POR 3–1 CHI (Sep 30)
- Lowest attendance: 428; KC 2–1 POR (Aug 16)
- Total attendance: 609,957
- Average attendance: 5,083
- All statistics correct as of October 1, 2017.

The 2017 National Women's Soccer League season was the fifth season of the National Women's Soccer League, the top division of women's soccer in the United States. Including the NWSL's two professional predecessors, Women's Professional Soccer (2009–2011) and the Women's United Soccer Association (2001–2003), it was the eleventh overall season of FIFA- and USSF-sanctioned top-division women's soccer in the United States. The league is operated by the United States Soccer Federation and receives major financial backing from that body. Further financial backing is provided by the Canadian Soccer Association; both national federations pay the league salaries of many of their respective national team members in an effort to nurture talent in those nations.

The reigning champions Western New York Flash did not play under that name; the franchise was sold, relocated to Cary, North Carolina and rebranded as the North Carolina Courage.

After schedule disruptions in the previous two years caused by the 2015 FIFA Women's World Cup and the 2016 Summer Olympics, NWSL teams in 2017 once again played 24 games, a schedule last played during the 2014 season. The Courage won the NWSL Shield (the regular season), topping the Portland Thorns by two points.

The NWSL Playoff semifinals were held October 7–8, 2017, and were won by the Thorns and the Courage. The NWSL Championship Game was held on October 14, 2017 at Orlando City Stadium in Orlando, Florida. The Thorns won 1–0, becoming NWSL Champions, their second championship.

== Teams, stadiums, and personnel ==
=== Stadiums and locations ===
Two teams, the Dash and Reign, do not make their stadiums' entire capacity available for home games, instead restricting ticket sales at a lower level. The full capacities of their venues are included in parentheses and italics.

Team	Stadium	Capacity
Boston Breakers	Soldiers Field Soccer Stadium	4,000
Chicago Red Stars	Toyota Park	20,000
Houston Dash	BBVA Compass Stadium	7,000 (22,039)
FC Kansas City	Swope Soccer Village (primary); Children's Mercy Park (secondary)	3,500; 18,467
North Carolina Courage	Sahlen's Stadium at WakeMed Soccer Park	10,000
Orlando Pride	Orlando City Stadium	25,500
Portland Thorns	Providence Park	21,144
Seattle Reign FC	Memorial Stadium	6,088 (12,000)
Sky Blue FC	Yurcak Field	5,000
Washington Spirit	Maryland SoccerPlex	4,000

Locations National Women's Soccer League teams.

=== Personnel and sponsorship ===
Note: All of the teams use Nike as their kit manufacturer.

Team	Head coach	Captain	Shirt sponsor
Boston Breakers	(England) Matt Beard	(United States) Julie King (England) Natasha Dowie	Steward Health Care
Chicago Red Stars	(United States) Rory Dames	(United States) Christen Press	Illinois Bone and Joint Institute
Houston Dash	(United States) Omar Morales (Interim)	(United States) Kealia Ohai (United States) Amber Brooks	BBVA Compass
FC Kansas City	(North Macedonia) Vlatko Andonovski	(United States) Becky Sauerbrunn	Domino's
North Carolina Courage	(England) Paul Riley	(New Zealand) Abby Erceg	Blue Cross & Blue Shield of North Carolina
Orlando Pride	(Scotland) Tom Sermanni	(United States) Ashlyn Harris (United States) Ali Krieger	Orlando Health
Portland Thorns	(England) Mark Parsons	(Canada) Christine Sinclair (United States) Tobin Heath	Providence Health & Services
Seattle Reign FC	(England) Laura Harvey	(Wales) Jess Fishlock (United States) Lauren Barnes	Microsoft
Sky Blue FC	Vacant	(United States) Christie Pearce	Meridian Health
Washington Spirit	(United States) Jim Gabarra	(Canada) Shelina Zadorsky	ProChain Solutions, Inc.

=== Coaching changes ===
Team	Outgoing manager	Manner of departure	Date of vacancy	Incoming manager	Date of appointment	Ref.
North Carolina Courage		Franchise relocation		(England) Paul Riley	January 30, 2017	
Houston Dash	(United States) Randy Waldrum	Mutual separation	May 29, 2017	(United States) Omar Morales (interim)	May 29, 2017	
Sky Blue FC	(Northern Ireland) Christy Holly	Mutual separation	August 16, 2017			

== Competition format ==
- Each team played a total of 24 games, 12 home and 12 away.
- The four teams at the end of the season with the most points qualified for the playoffs.

== League standings ==
Pos	Team	Pld	W	D	L	GF	GA	GD	Pts	Qualification
1	North Carolina Courage	24	16	1	7	38	22	+16	49	NWSL Shield
2	Portland Thorns FC (C)	24	14	5	5	37	20	+17	47	NWSL Playoffs
3	Orlando Pride	24	11	7	6	45	31	+14	40	NWSL Playoffs
4	Chicago Red Stars	24	11	6	7	33	30	+3	39	NWSL Playoffs
5	Seattle Reign FC	24	9	7	8	43	37	+6	34	
6	Sky Blue FC	24	10	3	11	42	51	−9	33	
7	FC Kansas City	24	8	7	9	29	31	−2	31	
8	Houston Dash	24	7	3	14	23	39	−16	24	
9	Boston Breakers	24	4	7	13	24	35	−11	19	
10	Washington Spirit	24	5	4	15	30	48	−18	19	

Source: NWSL
Rules for classification: Tiebreakers
(C) Champions

=== Tiebreakers ===
The initial determining factor for a team's position in the standings is most points earned, with three points earned for a win, one point for a draw, and zero points for a loss. If two or more teams tie in point total, when determining rank and playoff qualification and seeding, the NWSL uses the following tiebreaker rules, going down the list until all teams are ranked.

1. Head-to-head win–loss record between the teams (or points-per-game if more than two teams).
2. Greater goal difference across the entire season (against all teams, not just tied teams).
3. Greatest total number of goals scored (against all teams).
4. Apply #1–3 to games played on the road.
5. Apply #1–3 to games played at home.
6. If teams are still equal, ranking will be determined by a coin toss.

NOTE: If two clubs remain tied after another club with the same number of points advances during any step, the tie breaker reverts to step 1 of the two-club format.

=== Weekly live standings ===
Considering each week to end on a Sunday.

Week →	1	2	3	4	5	6	7	8	9	10	11	12	13	14	15	16	17	18	19	20	21	22
Team ↓																						
North Carolina Courage	4	1	1	1	1	1	1	1	1	1	1	1	1	2	1	1	1	1	1	1	1	1
Portland Thorns	3	4	3	2	3	5	5	3	4	4	5	5	4	3	3	2	2	2	2	2	2	2
Orlando Pride	10	10	10	10	9	8	8	7	6	7	6	6	6	7	7	4	4	4	4	4	4	3
Chicago Red Stars	9	6	8	4	6	3	2	2	2	2	2	2	2	1	2	3	3	3	3	3	3	4
Seattle Reign FC	5	2	5	6	2	4	4	5	5	5	3	4	5	4	4	5	5	6	5	5	5	5
Sky Blue FC	6	8	6	8	4	2	3	4	3	3	4	3	3	5	5	6	6	5	6	6	6	6
FC Kansas City	2	3	7	7	8	7	6	6	7	6	7	8	9	9	10	8	7	7	7	7	7	7
Houston Dash	1	7	4	5	7	9	9	9	10	9	8	7	7	6	6	7	8	8	8	8	8	8
Boston Breakers	8	5	2	3	5	6	7	8	9	10	9	9	8	8	8	9	9	9	9	10	9	9
Washington Spirit	7	9	9	9	10	10	10	10	8	8	10	10	10	10	9	10	10	10	10	9	10	10

Washington Spirit and Boston Breakers were eliminated from playoff contention in Week 18 on August 26, 2017 after losing their respective games. FC Kansas City and Houston Dash were both eliminated in Week 20 on September 9, after the Chicago Red Stars gained one more point in a tie against FC Kansas City. Sky Blue FC was eliminated later that weekend after a loss against the Washington Spirit. Seattle Reign was the last team to lose a playoff spot after a defeat in Week 21.

In Week 19, North Carolina Courage was the first team to clinch a playoff spot. Later that week, Portland Thorns clinched the second playoff spot. Both Chicago Red Stars and Orlando Pride clinched the remaining two spots in Week 21.

== Attendance ==
=== Average home attendances ===
Ranked from highest to lowest average attendance.

Team	GP	Attendance	High	Low	Average
Portland Thorns FC	12	211,830	21,144	14,471	17,653
Orlando Pride	12	74,233	14,452	4,273	6,186
Houston Dash	12	54,938	6,707	1,258	4,578
North Carolina Courage	12	52,672	7,020	2,383	4,389
Seattle Reign FC	12	48,449	6,041	2,727	4,037
Washington Spirit	12	41,891	5,200	2,365	3,491
Chicago Red Stars	12	38,379	4,934	1,827	3,198
Boston Breakers	12	34,754	4,321	2,276	2,896
Sky Blue FC	12	31,355	3,451	2,008	2,613
FC Kansas City	12	21,456	3,340	428	1,788
Total	120	609,957	21,144	428	5,083

Updated to games played on October 1, 2017.

=== Highest attendances ===
Regular season

Rank	Home team	Score	Away team	Attendance	Date	Stadium
1	Portland Thorns FC	3–1	Chicago Red Stars	21,144	September 30, 2017	Providence Park
2	Portland Thorns FC	2–0	Houston Dash	19,672	August 19, 2017	Providence Park
3	Portland Thorns FC	4–0	Washington Spirit	19,141	September 2, 2017	Providence Park
4	Portland Thorns FC	2–0	Boston Breakers	18,637	May 27, 2017	Providence Park
5	Portland Thorns FC	2–1	Washington Spirit	18,478	July 22, 2017	Providence Park
6	Portland Thorns FC	2–1	Houston Dash	18,243	August 5, 2017	Providence Park
7	Portland Thorns FC	4–1	Orlando Pride	18,193	October 7, 2017	Providence Park
8	Portland Thorns FC	1–0	North Carolina Courage	16,804	July 15, 2017	Providence Park
9	Portland Thorns FC	1–3	Sky Blue FC	16,736	June 17, 2017	Providence Park
10	Portland Thorns FC	3–0	FC Kansas City	16,199	June 28, 2017	Providence Park

Updated to games played on October 7, 2017.

== Statistical leaders ==
=== Top scorers ===
Rank	Player	Club	Goals
1	(Australia) Sam Kerr	Sky Blue FC	17
2	(Brazil) Marta	Orlando Pride	13
3	(United States) Megan Rapinoe	Seattle Reign FC	12
4	(United States) Christen Press	Chicago Red Stars	11
5	(United States) Alex Morgan	Orlando Pride	9
5	(United States) Lynn Williams	North Carolina Courage	9
7	(Canada) Christine Sinclair	Portland Thorns FC	8
8	(England) Natasha Dowie	Boston Breakers	7
8	(Wales) Jessica Fishlock	Seattle Reign FC	7
8	(United States) Ashley Hatch	North Carolina Courage	7

Updated: October 1, 2017

=== Top assists ===
Rank	Player	Club	Assists
1	(Japan) Nahomi Kawasumi	Seattle Reign FC	9
2	(United States) Shea Groom	FC Kansas City	6
2	(United States) Meghan Klingenberg	Portland Thorns FC	6
2	(Canada) Adriana Leon	Boston Breakers	6
2	(Brazil) Marta	Orlando Pride	6
6	(United States) Daphne Corboz	Sky Blue FC	5
6	(United States) Taylor Lytle	Sky Blue FC	5
6	(Brazil) Camila	Orlando Pride	5
6	(United States) Lynn Williams	North Carolina Courage	5

Updated: October 1, 2017

== NWSL Playoffs ==
The top four teams from the regular season competed for the NWSL Championship. In one semifinal, the North Carolina Courage defeated the Chicago Red Stars 1–0 on a dramatic 89th-minute goal. In the other, Portland Thorns FC defeated the Orlando Pride 4–1. One week later, in the final on October 14, Portland defeated North Carolina 1–0 to claim the NWSL Championship.

Semi-finals
2	Portland Thorns FC	4
3	Orlando Pride	1
1	North Carolina Courage	1
4	Chicago Red Stars	0

Championship
2	Portland Thorns FC	1
1	North Carolina Courage	0

=== Semi-finals ===
October 7, 2017
12:30pm (PDT)

Portland Thorns FC	4–1	Orlando Pride
Henry 12' (yellow card) 80'; Sonnett 15'; Raso 71'; Sinclair 82'	Report; Report	Kennedy 23'

Providence Park
Portland, Oregon
Attendance: 18,193
Referee: Timothy Ford
October 8, 2017
3:30pm (EDT)

North Carolina Courage	1–0	Chicago Red Stars
O'Sullivan 89'	Report; Report	Colaprico (yellow card) 36'

Sahlen’s Stadium at WakeMed Soccer Park
Cary, North Carolina
Attendance: 10,017
Referee: Ramy Touchan

=== Championship ===
October 14, 2017
4:30pm (EDT)

North Carolina Courage	0–1	Portland Thorns FC
	Report; Report	Heath (yellow card) 41'; Raso (yellow card) 45+1'; Horan 50'; Brynjarsdóttir (yellow card) 72'

Orlando City Stadium
Orlando, Florida
Attendance: 8,124
Referee: Danielle Chesky

== Individual awards ==
=== Monthly awards ===
==== Player of the Month ====
Month	Player of the Month		Club	Month's Statline
April	(United States)	Rose Lavelle	Boston Breakers	1 goal, 1 assist in 3 games; Breakers 2-1-0 in April
May	(Australia)	Sam Kerr	Sky Blue FC	2 goals, 2 assists in 5 games; Sky Blue FC 3-2-0 in May
June	(Australia)	Sam Kerr	Sky Blue FC	3 goals, 1 assist in 4 games; 30th career goal
July	(United States)	Megan Rapinoe	Seattle Reign FC	5 goals in 4 games; Reign FC 2-1-1 in July
August	(United States)	Alex Morgan	Orlando Pride	7 goals, 2 assists, 13 shots on goal, 11 chances created
September	(Brazil)	Marta	Orlando Pride	2 goals, 13 chances created, 85.5% passing accuracy

==== Team of the Month ====
Month	Goalkeeper	Defenders	Midfielders	Forwards	Ref
April	(Canada) Stephanie Labbé, WAS	(Cameroon) Estelle Johnson, WAS (United States) Becky Sauerbrunn, KC (United States) Emily Sonnett, POR	(United States) Julie Ertz, CHI (Brazil) Debinha, NC (United States) Rose Lavelle, BOS (Wales) Jess Fishlock, SEA (United States) Sam Mewis, NC	(United States) Kealia Ohai, HOU (United States) Lynn Williams, NC	
May	(Canada) Kailen Sheridan, NJ	(United States) Samantha Johnson, CHI (United States) Becky Sauerbrunn, KC (United States) Casey Short, CHI	(United States) Danielle Colaprico, CHI (France) Amandine Henry, POR (United States) Rose Lavelle, BOS (United States) Sarah Killion, NJ	(Japan) Nahomi Kawasumi, SEA (United States) Christen Press, CHI (Australia) Sam Kerr, NJ	
June	(Canada) Stephanie Labbé, WAS	(United States) Casey Short, CHI (United States) Abby Dahlkemper, NC (United States) Ali Krieger, ORL (Cameroon) Estelle Johnson, WAS	(Brazil) Marta, ORL (United States) Sam Mewis, NC (Wales) Jess Fishlock, SEA	(United States) Megan Rapinoe, SEA (Australia) Sam Kerr, NJ (United States) Ashley Hatch, NC	
July	(United States) Jane Campbell, HOU	(United States) Amber Brooks, KC (United States) Abby Dahlkemper, NC (United States) Casey Short, CHI (United States) Taylor Smith, NC	(Brazil) Andressinha, HOU (United States) Julie Ertz, CHI (Brazil) Marta, ORL (United States) McCall Zerboni, NC	(Australia) Sam Kerr, NJ (United States) Megan Rapinoe, SEA	
August	(United States) Katelyn Rowland, NC	(Australia) Steph Catley, ORL (United States) Emily Sonnett, POR (United States) Ali Krieger, ORL (United States) Taylor Smith, NC	(Brazil) Marta, ORL (United States) Sam Mewis, NC (United States) Lindsey Horan, POR	(Australia) Hayley Raso, POR (United States) Alex Morgan, ORL (Australia) Sam Kerr, NJ	
September	(United States) Adrianna Franch, POR	(United States) Emily Menges, POR (United States) Kelley O'Hara, NJ (United States) Becky Sauerbrunn, KC (United States) Casey Short, CHI	(Australia) Alanna Kennedy, ORL (Brazil) Marta, ORL (United States) Sam Mewis, NC	(United States) Shea Groom, KC (Canada) Christine Sinclair, POR (United States) Lynn Williams, NC	

=== Weekly awards ===
Week	NWSL Player of the Week		NWSL Goal of the Week		NWSL Save of the Week		Reference
Week	Player	Club	Player	Club	Player	Club	Reference
1	(United States) Haley Kopmeyer	Seattle Reign FC	(England) Rachel Daly	Houston Dash	(United States) Ashlyn Harris	Orlando Pride	
2	(Wales) Jess Fishlock	Seattle Reign FC	(United States) Danica Evans	Orlando Pride	(Brazil) Mônica	Orlando Pride	
3	(Canada) Adriana Leon	Boston Breakers	(Brazil) Camila	Orlando Pride	(United States) Adrianna Franch	Portland Thorns FC	
4	(Nigeria) Francisca Ordega	Washington Spirit	(Wales) Jess Fishlock	Seattle Reign FC	(United States) Ashlyn Harris	Orlando Pride	
5	(Japan) Nahomi Kawasumi	Seattle Reign FC	(United States) Christen Press	Chicago Red Stars	(United States) Alyssa Naeher	Chicago Red Stars	
6	(United States) Christen Press	Chicago Red Stars	(United States) Sofia Huerta	Chicago Red Stars	(United States) Abby Smith	Boston Breakers	
7	(United States) Sydney Leroux	FC Kansas City	(United States) Becky Sauerbrunn	FC Kansas City	(United States) Danielle Colaprico	Chicago Red Stars	
8	(United States) Lindsey Horan	Portland Thorns FC	(United States) Lindsey Horan	Portland Thorns FC	(United States) Adrianna Franch	Portland Thorns FC	
9	(Australia) Sam Kerr	Sky Blue FC	(Brazil) Camila	Orlando Pride	(United States) Aubrey Bledsoe	Orlando Pride	
10	(Brazil) Poliana	Houston Dash	(United States) Vanessa DiBernardo	Chicago Red Stars	(Australia) Steph Catley	Orlando Pride	
11	(United States) Megan Rapinoe	Seattle Reign FC	(Australia) Sam Kerr	Sky Blue FC	(Canada) Stephanie Labbé	Washington Spirit	
12	(Australia) Sam Kerr	Sky Blue FC	(United States) Lindsey Horan	Portland Thorns FC	(United States) Aubrey Bledsoe	Orlando Pride	
13	(Brazil) Andressinha	Houston Dash	(United States) Toni Pressley	Orlando Pride	(United States) Aubrey Bledsoe	Orlando Pride	
14	(United States) Megan Rapinoe	Seattle Reign FC	(United States) Megan Rapinoe	Seattle Reign FC	(United States) Alyssa Naeher	Chicago Red Stars	
14	(United States) Megan Rapinoe	Seattle Reign FC	(United States) Christen Press	Chicago Red Stars	(United States) Alyssa Naeher	Chicago Red Stars	
15	(United States) Arielle Ship	Washington Spirit	(United States) Sofia Huerta	Chicago Red Stars	(United States) Adrianna Franch	Portland Thorns FC	
16	(United States) Sam Mewis	North Carolina Courage	(Brazil) Marta	Orlando Pride	(United States) Adrianna Franch	Portland Thorns FC	
17	(Australia) Sam Kerr	Sky Blue FC	(Australia) Sam Kerr	Sky Blue FC	(United States) Ashlyn Harris	Orlando Pride	
18	(Australia) Hayley Raso	Portland Thorns FC	(United States) Alex Morgan	Orlando Pride	(United States) Ashlyn Harris	Orlando Pride	
19	(United States) Shea Groom	FC Kansas City	(United States) Julie Ertz	Chicago Red Stars	(United States) Jane Campbell	Houston Dash	
20	(United States) Whitney Church	Washington Spirit	(Canada) Christine Sinclair	Portland Thorns	(United States) DiDi Haracic (United States) Whitney Church	Washington Spirit	
21	(Canada) Adriana Leon	Boston Breakers	(England) Rachel Daly	Houston Dash	(United States) Ashlyn Harris (Brazil) Mônica	Orlando Pride	
22	(Wales) Jess Fishlock	Seattle Reign	(Australia) Alanna Kennedy	Orlando Pride	(United States) Ashlyn Harris	Orlando Pride	

=== Annual awards ===
Award	Winner	Team	Notes
Golden Boot	(Australia) Sam Kerr	Sky Blue FC	17 goals
Coach of the Year	(England) Paul Riley	North Carolina Courage	NWSL Shield Winner
Rookie of the Year	(United States) Ashley Hatch	North Carolina Courage	7 goals, 1 assist, 1,200 minutes
Goalkeeper of the Year	(United States) Adrianna Franch	Portland Thorns FC	11 shutouts, 80 saves, 0.83 GA/A
Defender of the Year	(United States) Abby Dahlkemper	North Carolina Courage	Played all 2,160 minutes
Most Valuable Player	(Australia) Sam Kerr	Sky Blue FC	League record 17 goals

NWSL Best XI
Position	First team			Second team		
Goalkeeper	(United States) Adrianna Franch	Portland Thorns FC	11 SO; 80 saves	(United States) Katelyn Rowland	North Carolina Courage	8 SO, 39 saves
Defender	(United States) Casey Short	Chicago Red Stars	2,004 minutes	(Australia) Steph Catley	Orlando Pride	2,032 minutes
Defender	(United States) Abby Dahlkemper	North Carolina Courage	2,160 minutes	(New Zealand) Abby Erceg	North Carolina Courage	1 goal, 2 assists
Defender	(United States) Becky Sauerbrunn	FC Kansas City	1,980 minutes	(United States) Meghan Klingenberg	Portland Thorns FC	6 assists
Defender	(United States) Ali Krieger	Orlando Pride	2,160 minutes	(United States) Emily Menges	Portland Thorns FC	2,063 minutes
Midfielder	(Wales) Jess Fishlock	Seattle Reign FC	7 goals, 2 assists	(United States) Danielle Colaprico	Chicago Red Stars	1,093 minutes
Midfielder	(United States) Sam Mewis	North Carolina Courage	6 goals, 3 assists	(United States) Julie Ertz	Chicago Red Stars	4 goals, 3 assists
Midfielder	(United States) McCall Zerboni	North Carolina Courage	23 starts	(United States) Lindsey Horan	Portland Thorns FC	4 goals, 2 assists
FW // MF	(Brazil) Marta	Orlando Pride	13 goals, 6 assists	(United States) Sofia Huerta	Chicago Red Stars	6 goals, 4 assists
Forward	(Australia) Sam Kerr	Sky Blue FC	record 17 goals	(United States) Alex Morgan	Orlando Pride	9 goals, 4 assists
Forward	(United States) Christen Press	Chicago Red Stars	5 GWG	(United States) Megan Rapinoe	Seattle Reign FC	12 goals, 1 assist

NWSL Championship Game MVP
Player	Club	Record
(United States) Lindsey Horan	Portland Thorns FC	Scored the game-winning goal
