= Mallory Eubanks =

American association football player

Personal information
- Full name: Mallory Leigh Eubanks
- Date of birth: June 4, 1996 (age 30)
- Place of birth: Lexington, Kentucky, United States
- Height: 5 ft 4 in (1.63 m)
- Position: Forward

College career
Years	Team	Apps	(Gls)
2014–2017	Mississippi State Bulldogs	70	(8)

Senior career*
Years	Team	Apps	(Gls)
2018–2019	Washington Spirit	12	(0)

International career
2017–2018	United States U23		
- * Club domestic league appearances and goals as of December 29, 2018

Mallory Leigh Eubanks (born June 4, 1996) is an American soccer forward who played for the Washington Spirit in the National Women's Soccer League (NWSL).

== College career ==
In 2014, Eubanks attended Mississippi State University, where she played for the Mississippi State Bulldogs. Impressing her freshman year, Eubanks was named to the SEC All-Freshman team. She would go on to earn additional honors including 2017 SEC Scholar-Athlete of the Year and Second Team All-SEC. Her college career saw her earn 70 appearances for the Bulldogs, scoring 8 goals and registering 17 assists.

== Club career ==
In January 2018, Eubanks was drafted by the Washington Spirit in the second round, sixteenth overall. However, due to roster limits, she was waived before the season started with her rights retained by the Spirit. By Week 2 of the season, Eubanks was signed as a Replacement Player for Argentine player, Estefanía Banini. While playing as replacement status, teammate Cali Farquharson was placed on the disable list due to injury, opening a full roster spot. Eubanks signed a full contract with the Spirit on May 17 and played out the rest of the season making 12 appearances for the Spirit.
