= Cheyna Matthews =

Jamaican footballer (born 1993)

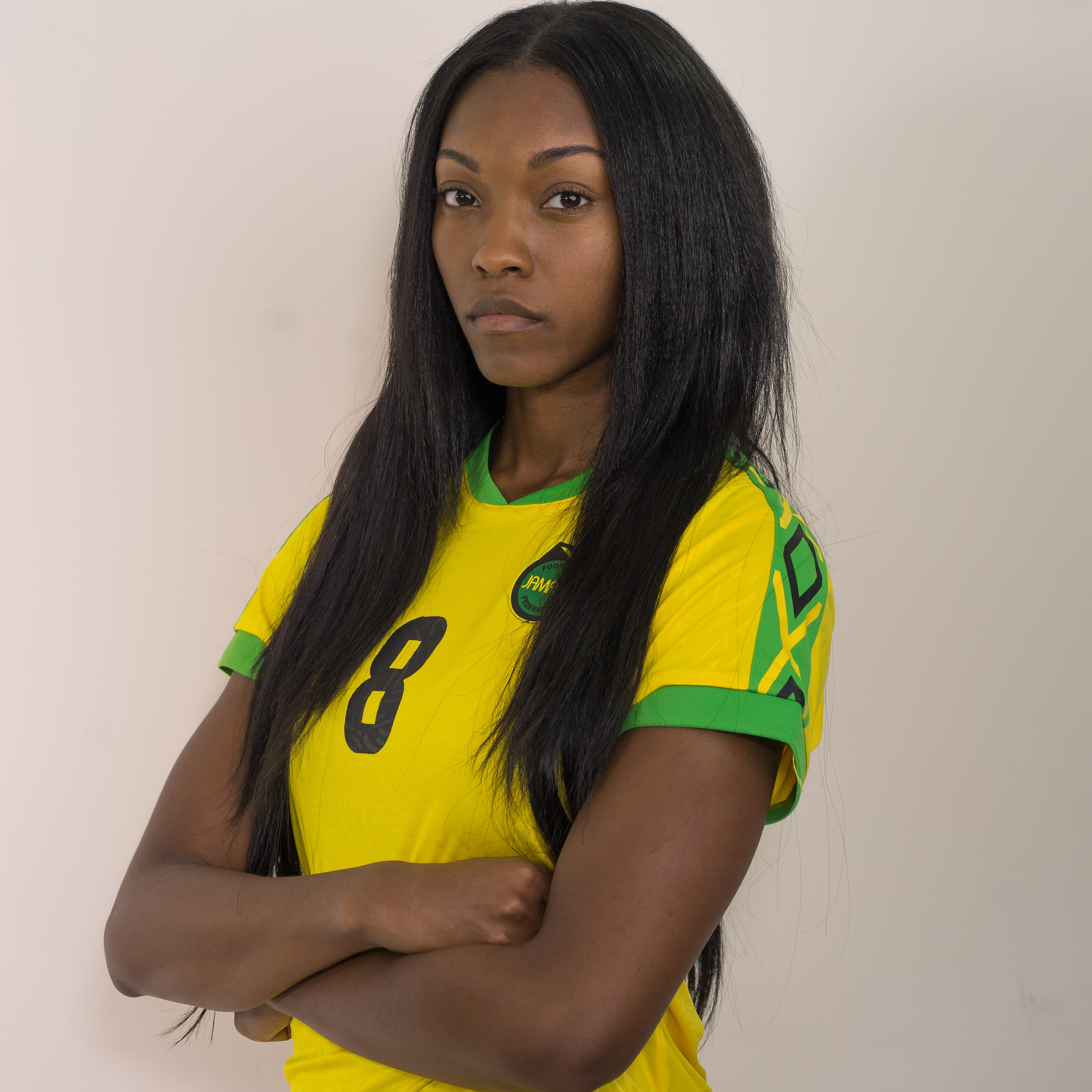
- Matthews with Jamaica in 2019

Personal information
- Full name: Cheyna Lee Matthews
- Birth name: Cheyna Lee Williams
- Date of birth: 10 November 1993 (age 33)
- Place of birth: Lynn, Massachusetts, U.S.
- Height: 1.75 m (5 ft 9 in)
- Position: Forward

College career
Years	Team	Apps	(Gls)
2012–2013	Vanderbilt Commodores	35	(22)
2014–2015	Florida State Seminoles	51	(24)

Senior career*
Years	Team	Apps	(Gls)
2016–2020	Washington Spirit	55	(11)
2021–2022	Racing Louisville	17	(1)
2023	Chicago Red Stars	14	(1)

International career^{‡}
2015	United States U23	2	(0)
2019–2023	Jamaica	18	(0)
- * Club domestic league appearances and goals as of 16 October 2023 ‡ National team caps and goals as of 16 October 2023

Cheyna Lee Matthews (née Williams; born 10 November 1993) is a former professional footballer who played as a forward. Born in the United States, she represented Jamaica internationally.

== College career ==
=== Vanderbilt ===
In 2012, Williams attended Vanderbilt University, where she made 17 appearances, scored six goals and registered six assists her freshman year. Building on a successful season, she started all 18 games her sophomore year, scoring 16 goals and registering five assists. Her performance in 2013 named her First-Team All-SEC.

=== Florida State ===
In 2014, Williams transferred to Florida State University, where she would continue her form. She made 24 starts (26 appearances) and helped the Seminoles win their first NCAA National Championship in program history. Williams would finish her season year with an additional 25 games played and scoring 10 goals.

== Club career ==
=== Washington Spirit (2016–2020) ===
Matthews was drafted by Washington Spirit in the 1st round of the 2016 NWSL College Draft. She signed with the Spirit in April 2016. In her rookie season, Matthews played in 17 regular season games, 8 starts, totaling 779 minutes and scored three goals. The Georgia native scored her first professional goal on 31 July 2016 against Sky Blue FC. The team went on to make its first-ever NWSL Championship appearance, ultimately losing on penalties to Western New York Flash. Matthews dressed but served as an unused substitute.

The Spirit would struggle in the 2017 season but Matthews became a regular contributor making 21 appearances and scoring 5 goals (tied for second on the team).

Matthews sat out the 2018 season due to pregnancy.

Ahead of the 2020 season, the Spirit announced that Matthews would be taking a paid leave of absence to focus on her family situation, notably the potential for her husband, Jordan Matthews, to relocate within the NFL. The paid leave was anticipated to last until May of the year and stipulated that Matthews could continue her career elsewhere, if necessary.

In October 2020, Matthews was placed on the NWSL Re-Entry Wire by the Spirit.

=== Racing Louisville FC (2021–2022) ===
In November 2020, Matthews was selected off the NWSL Re-Entry Wire by Racing Louisville FC.

=== Chicago Red Stars ===
She signed with Chicago Red Stars in March 2023. On October 13, 2023, Matthews announced her retirement from professional football.

== International career ==
Matthews represented the United States at under–23 level in 2015. She was also eligible to play for Jamaica through her mother, who was born in Portland Parish. In January 2019, she was called up by the Reggae Girlz for the first time, joining the team in a training camp to prepare the first FIFA Women's World Cup appearance in Jamaica history. She made her debut in a 1–0 friendly win against Chile on 28 February 2019.

Matthews was selected for Jamaica's 2019 FIFA Women's World Cup squad. She made her World Cup debut during the team's first group stage match against Brazil in Grenoble.

== Personal life ==
Matthews married San Francisco 49ers wide-receiver Jordan Matthews in February 2018 having met while both attended Vanderbilt University. The couple have three sons together, Josiah, Lionel and Cairo. Matthews is a Christian.

In March 2022, Matthews announced they were expecting a third son.
