= Cameron Castleberry =

American soccer midfielder

Personal information
- Full name: Cameron Hardy Castleberry
- Date of birth: March 14, 1995 (age 31)
- Place of birth: Raleigh, North Carolina, United States
- Height: 5 ft 7 in (1.70 m)
- Positions: Midfielder; winger

Youth career
- Ravenscroft School
- CASL Chelsea Ladies '94 team

College career
Years	Team	Apps	(Gls)
2013–2016	North Carolina Tar Heels	63	(9)

Senior career*
Years	Team	Apps	(Gls)
2017	Washington Spirit	2	(0)

International career
2011–2012	United States U17		
2013	United States U18		
2013	United States U20		
- * Club domestic league appearances and goals as of June 29, 2017

Cameron Hardy Castleberry (born March 14, 1995) is an American soccer midfielder who last played for the Washington Spirit of the National Women's Soccer League.

== Early life and collegiate career ==
Castleberry attended Ravenscroft School where she played on the soccer team. She scored 25 goals and notching 15 assists. In 2011, Castleberry was named the NC 3A Private School Player of the Year, the TISAC Conference Player of the Year, Region 1 Player of the Year. She was also nominated an All-State, All-Region and All-Conference selection in 2011 and 2012.

Castleberry attended the University of North Carolina at Chapel Hill, one of the most successful women's soccer programs in the United States. She played a key role for the Tar Heels in four years she spent there, becoming a starter from her sophomore year until her senior year.

== Club career ==
On January 12, 2017, Castleberry became the 36th overall pick in the 2017 NWSL College Draft when she was picked by Washington Spirit. On May 6, 2017, she made her debut when she replaced Arielle Ship at the 65th minute of the match against Sky Blue FC. The Spirit waived Castleberry on June 29, 2017.

== International career ==
Castleberry played for the United States U17 in 2011 and 2012. In February 2013 she was called for the United States U18 and in the same year she was called for the United States U20.
