= 2017 NWSL College Draft =

Soccer draft

General information
- Sport: Soccer
- Date: January 12, 2017
- Time: 12:00 PM PT
- Location: Los Angeles, California

Overview
- 40 total selections in 4 rounds
- First selection: Rose Lavelle, Boston Breakers
- Most selections: Boston Breakers and Sky Blue FC (6 picks)
- Fewest selections: Orlando Pride (2 picks)

The 2017 NWSL College Draft was the fifth annual meeting of National Women's Soccer League (NWSL) franchises to select eligible college players. It was held on January 12, 2017 at the National Soccer Coaches Association of America Convention in Los Angeles, California.

== Format ==
- Draft order was determined by the final 2016 regular season standings.

== Results ==
As of November 23, 2023

=== Key ===
^{+}	Denotes player who has been selected as NWSL Most Valuable Player
^{*}	Denotes player who has been selected for an NWSL Best XI or NWSL Second XI team
^{^}	Denotes player who has been selected as NWSL Rookie of the Year
^{#}	Denotes player who has never appeared in an NWSL regular season or playoff game

=== Picks ===
Round	Pick	Nat.	Player	Pos.	NWSL team	Notes	College
Round 1	1	(United States)	Rose Lavelle ^{*}	M	Boston Breakers		Wisconsin
Round 1	2	(United States)	Ashley Hatch ^{^*}	F	North Carolina Courage	(Note: Orlando Pride → North Carolina Courage. December 17, 2015: North Carolina Courage acquired Orlando's 2nd round pick (11th overall) in the 2016 NWSL College Draft and Orlando's 1st round pick in the 2017 NWSL College Draft in exchange for Becky Edwards and the rights to Kristen Edmonds.)	BYU
Round 1	3	(United States)	Morgan Andrews	M	Boston Breakers	(Note: Houston Dash → Seattle Reign FC → Washington Spirit → Boston Breakers. October 21, 2015: Seattle Reign FC acquired Meghan Klingenberg and a conditional 2017 draft pick (later settled as Houston's 2017 1st round pick) from the Houston Dash in exchange for Amber Brooks and the 5th overall pick in the 2016 NWSL College Draft. November 10, 2016: Seattle Reign FC acquired Christine Nairn and the rights to Madalyn Schiffel from the Washington Spirit in exchange for Havana Solaun and the 3rd and 36th overall picks in the 2017 NWSL College Draft. November 17, 2016: Boston Breakers acquired Megan Oyster and the 3rd and 9th overall picks in the 2017 NWSL College Draft from the Washington Spirit in exchange for Kristie Mewis and Kassey Kallman.)	USC
Round 1	4	(United States)	Kayla Mills	D	Sky Blue FC		USC
Round 1	5	(United States)	Christina Gibbons	M	FC Kansas City		Duke
Round 1	6	(United States)	Maddie Bauer	D	Seattle Reign FC		Stanford
Round 1	7	(United States)	Darian Jenkins	F	North Carolina Courage		UCLA
Round 1	8	(Nigeria)	Ifeoma Onumonu ^{*}	F	Boston Breakers	(Note: Chicago Red Stars → Boston Breakers. January 5, 2017: Boston Breakers acquired the 8th and 38th overall picks in the 2017 NWSL College Draft from Chicago in exchange for the 12th, 16th and 21st overall picks in the 2017 NWSL College Draft.)	California
Round 1	9	(United States)	Midge Purce ^{*}	F	Boston Breakers	(Note: Washington Spirit → Boston Breakers. November 17, 2016: Boston Breakers acquired Megan Oyster and the 3rd and 9th overall picks in the 2017 NWSL College Draft from the Washington Spirit in exchange for Kristie Mewis and Kassey Kallman.)	Harvard
Round 1	10	(United States)	Mandy Freeman	D	Sky Blue FC	(Note: Portland Thorns FC → Sky Blue FC. January 15, 2016: Portland Thorns FC acquired the rights to Nadia Nadim, the 3rd overall pick in the 2016 NWSL College Draft and a 2017 2nd round pick from Sky Blue FC in exchange for the 2nd overall pick in the 2016 NWSL College Draft, a 1st round pick in the 2017 NWSL College Draft, and a conditional pick in the 2017 NWSL College Draft.)	USC
Round 2	11	(United States)	Michele Vasconcelos	F	Chicago Red Stars	(Note: Boston Breakers → Chicago Red Stars → Boston Breakers → Chicago Red Stars. June 29, 2016: Chicago Red Stars acquired a second-round pick in the 2017 NWSL College Draft from the Boston Breakers in exchange for a 2016 international roster spot, which Boston used to sign Ghoutia Karchouni. July 22, 2016: Boston Breakers acquired a 2017 international roster slot, two second-round picks, a third-round pick, a fourth-round pick in the 2017 NWSL College Draft from Chicago Red Stars in exchange for Stephanie McCaffrey. January 12, 2017: Chicago Red Stars re-acquired the 11th overall pick from the Boston Breakers in exchange for Chicago's second-round pick in the 2018 NWSL College Draft and a 2018 international roster spot.)	BYU
Round 2	12	(United States)	Morgan Proffitt	M	Chicago Red Stars	(Note: Orlando Pride → FC Kansas City → WNY Flash → Boston Breakers → Chicago Red Stars. October 26, 2015: Orlando Pride acquired Sarah Hagen and the 15th overall pick in the 2016 NWSL College Draft from FC Kansas City in exchange for Orlando's second-round pick in the 2017 NWSL College Draft. January 13, 2016: Western New York Flash acquired Jessica McDonald, a 2016 and 2017 international roster spot, and a second-round pick in the 2017 NWSL College Draft from FC Kansas City in exchange for Sydney Leroux. June 14, 2016: Boston Breakers acquired the WNY Flash's highest second-round pick in the 2017 NWSL College Draft in exchange for McCall Zerboni. January 5, 2017: Boston Breakers acquired the 8th and 38th overall picks in the 2017 NWSL College Draft from Chicago in exchange for the 12th, 16th and 21st overall picks in the 2017 NWSL College Draft.)	Marquette
Round 2	13	(Nigeria)	Toni Payne^{#}	F	FC Kansas City	(Note: Houston Dash → WNY Flash → FC Kansas City. March 29, 2016: Houston Dash acquired Rebecca Moros from the Western New York Flash in exchange for a second-round pick in the 2017 NWSL College Draft. June 10, 2016: Western New York Flash acquired Katelyn Rowland from FC Kansas City in exchange for two second-round picks in the 2017 NWSL College Draft.)	Duke
Round 2	14	(United States)	Rachel Hill	F	Portland Thorns FC	(Note: Sky Blue FC → Portland Thorns FC. January 15, 2016: Portland Thorns FC acquired the rights to Nadia Nadim, the 3rd overall pick in the 2016 NWSL College Draft and a 2017 2nd round pick from Sky Blue FC in exchange for the 2nd overall pick in the 2016 NWSL College Draft, a 1st round pick in the 2017 NWSL College Draft, and a conditional pick in the 2017 NWSL College Draft.)	UConn
Round 2	15	(United States)	Jane Campbell *	G	Houston Dash	(Note: FC Kansas City → Chicago Red Stars → Boston Breakers → Houston Dash. January 17, 2016: Chicago Red Stars acquired a second-round pick in the 2017 NWSL College Draft from FC Kansas City in exchange for a 2016 international roster slot. July 22, 2016: Boston Breakers acquired a 2017 international roster slot, two second-round picks, a third-round pick, a fourth-round pick in the 2017 NWSL College Draft from Chicago Red Stars in exchange for Stephanie McCaffrey. November 28, 2016: Houston Dash acquired a 2017 and 2018 international roster slot and the 15th overall pick in the 2017 NWSL College Draft from the Boston Breakers in exchange for Allysha Chapman.)	Stanford
Round 2	16	(Mexico)	Katie Johnson	F	Seattle Reign FC	(Note: Seattle Reign FC → Boston Breakers → Chicago Red Stars → Seattle Reign FC. December 18, 2015: Seattle Reign FC acquired a 2016 international roster slot from the Boston Breakers in exchange for a second-round pick in the 2017 NWSL College Draft. January 5, 2017: Boston Breakers acquired the 8th and 38th overall picks in the 2017 NWSL College Draft from the Chicago Red Stars in exchange for the 12th, 16th and 21st overall picks in the 2017 NWSL College Draft. January 12, 2017: Seattle Reign FC acquired the 16th overall pick in the 2017 NWSL College Draft from the Chicago Red Stars in exchange for Seattle's first-round pick in the 2018 NWSL College Draft.)	USC
Round 2	17	(United States)	Stephanie Ribeiro^{#}	F	FC Kansas City	(Note: WNY Flash → FC Kansas City. June 10, 2016: Western New York Flash acquired Katelyn Rowland from FC Kansas City in exchange for two second-round picks in the 2017 NWSL College Draft.)	UConn
Round 2	18	(United States)	Savannah Jordan	F	Portland Thorns FC	(Note: Chicago Red Stars → Boston Breakers → WNY Flash → Portland Thorns FC. November 22, 2016: Chicago Red Stars acquired Alyssa Naeher and the 22nd overall pick in the 2016 NWSL College Draft from the Boston Breakers in exchange for Whitney Engen, the 17th overall pick in the 2016 NWSL College Draft and a second-round pick in the 2017 NWSL College Draft. January 17, 2016: Boston Breakers acquired a 2016 international roster slot from the Western New York Flash in exchange for a second-round pick in the 2017 NWSL College Draft. January 12, 2017: Portland Thorns FC acquired the 18th overall selection from the North Carolina Courage in exchange for the 20th and 27th overall picks in the 2017 NWSL College Draft.)	Florida
Round 2	19	(Canada)	Lindsay Agnew	F	Washington Spirit		Ohio State
Round 2	20	(United States)	Claire Wagner^{#}	D	North Carolina Courage	(Note: Portland Thorns FC → North Carolina Courage. January 12, 2017: Portland Thorns FC acquired the 18th overall pick from the North Carolina Courage in exchange for the 20th and 27th overall picks in the 2017 NWSL College Draft.)	Clemson
Round 3	21	(United States)	Tyler Lussi	F	Portland Thorns FC	(Note: Boston Breakers → Chicago Red Stars → Portland Thorns FC. January 5, 2017: Boston Breakers acquired the 8th and 38th overall picks in the 2017 NWSL College Draft from Chicago in exchange for the 12th, 16th and 21st overall picks in the 2017 NWSL College Draft. January 12, 2017: Portland Thorns FC acquire the 21st overall pick in the 2017 NWSL College Draft from the Chicago Red Stars in exchange for their second-round and third-round picks in the 2018 NWSL College Draft.)	Princeton
Round 3	22	(United States)	Danica Evans	F	Orlando Pride		Colorado
Round 3	23	(Canada)	Kailen Sheridan ^{*}	G	Sky Blue FC	(Note: Houston Dash → Sky Blue FC. November 25, 2015: Sky Blue FC acquired the 36th overall pick in the 2016 NWSL College Draft and a third-round pick in the 2017 NWSL College Draft from the Houston Dash in exchange for the rights to Chioma Ubogagu.)	Clemson
Round 3	24	(United States)	Madison Tiernan	F	Sky Blue FC		Rutgers
Round 3	25	(United States)	Alexis Shaffer^{#}	M	FC Kansas City		Virginia
Round 3	26	(United States)	Arielle Ship	F	Seattle Reign FC		California
Round 3	27	(United States)	Jaycie Johnson	F	North Carolina Courage	(Note: WNY Flash → Portland Thorns FC → North Carolina Courage. March 30, 2016: Portland Thorns FC acquired Mallory Weber and a third-round pick in the 2017 NWSL College Draft from the Western New York Flash in exchange for a 2016 international roster slot. January 12, 2017: Portland Thorns FC acquired the 18th overall selection from the North Carolina Courage in exchange for the 20th and 27th overall picks in the 2017 NWSL College Draft.)	Nebraska
Round 3	28	(Canada)	Nichelle Prince	F	Houston Dash	(Note: Chicago Red Stars → Boston Breakers → Chicago Red Stars → Houston Dash. July 22, 2016: Boston Breakers acquired a 2017 international roster slot, two second-round picks, a third-round pick, a fourth-round pick in the 2017 NWSL College Draft from Chicago Red Stars in exchange for Stephanie McCaffrey. November 3, 2016: Chicago Red Stars acquired a second-round and third-round pick in the 2017 NWSL College Draft from the Boston Breakers in exchange for Amanda DaCosta. January 12, 2017: Houston Dash acquired the 28th overall pick in the 2017 NWSL College Draft from the Chicago Red Stars in exchange for a second-round pick in the 2018 NWSL College Draft.)	Ohio State
Round 3	29	(United States)	Meggie Dougherty Howard	M	Washington Spirit		Florida
Round 3	30	(United States)	Catrina Atanda^{#}	M	Sky Blue FC	(Note: Portland Thorns FC → Sky Blue FC. January 15, 2016: Portland Thorns FC acquired the rights to Nadia Nadim, the 3rd overall pick in the 2016 NWSL College Draft and a 2017 2nd round pick from Sky Blue FC in exchange for the 2nd overall pick in the 2016 NWSL College Draft, a 1st round pick in the 2017 NWSL College Draft, and a conditional pick in the 2017 NWSL College Draft.)	Clemson
Round 4	31	(United States)	Sammy Jo Prudhomme	G	Boston Breakers		USC
Round 4	32	(Puerto Rico)	Nickolette Driesse	M	Orlando Pride		Penn State
Round 4	33	(United States)	Erin Smith^{#}	D	Houston Dash		Rutgers
Round 4	34	(United States)	McKenzie Meehan	F	Sky Blue FC		Boston College
Round 4	35	(United States)	Rashida Beal^{#}	D	FC Kansas City		Minnesota
Round 4	36	(United States)	Cameron Castleberry	M	Washington Spirit	(Note: Seattle Reign FC → Washington Spirit. November 10, 2016: Seattle Reign FC acquired Christine Nairn and the rights to Madalyn Schiffel from the Washington Spirit in exchange for Havana Solaun and the 3rd and 36th overall picks in the 2017 NWSL College Draft.)	North Carolina
Round 4	37	(United States)	Kristen McNabb	D	Seattle Reign FC	(Note: WNY Flash → Chicago Red Stars → Seattle Reign FC. November 10, 2015: Chicago Red Stars acquired Whitney Engen and a fourth-round pick in the 2017 NWSL College Draft from the Western New York Flash in exchange for Abby Erceg, Adriana Leon, and the 9th overall pick in the 2016 NWSL College Draft. December 16, 2016: Seattle Reign FC acquired a 2017 international roster slot and the 37th overall pick in the 2017 NWSL College Draft from the Chicago Red Stars in exchange for the rights to Summer Green.)	Virginia
Round 4	38	(United States)	Hayley Dowd	F	Boston Breakers	(Note: Chicago Red Stars → Boston Breakers → Chicago Red Stars → Boston Breakers. July 22, 2016: Boston Breakers acquired a 2017 international roster slot, two second-round picks, a third-round pick, a fourth-round pick in the 2017 NWSL College Draft from Chicago Red Stars in exchange for Stephanie McCaffrey. November 3, 2016: Chicago Red Stars acquired a second-round and third-round pick in the 2017 NWSL College Draft from the Boston Breakers in exchange for Amanda DaCosta. January 5, 2017: Boston Breakers acquired the 8th and 38th overall picks in the 2017 NWSL College Draft from Chicago in exchange for the 12th, 16th and 21st overall picks in the 2017 NWSL College Draft.)	Boston College
Round 4	39	(United States)	Lauren Kaskie	M	Chicago Red Stars	(Note: Washington Spirit → Chicago Red Stars. January 25, 2016: Chicago Red Stars acquired Amanda DaCosta and a fourth-round pick in the 2017 NWSL College Draft from the Washington Spirit for a player to be named later (later revealed to be Stephanie Labbé).)	UCLA
Round 4	40	(United States)	Caroline Flynn	M	Portland Thorns FC		Nebraska

=== Notable undrafted players ===
Below is a list of undrafted rookies who appeared in a competitive NWSL game in 2017.

Nat.	Player	Pos.	Original NWSL team	College	Notes
(United States)	Meghan Cox	D	Portland Thorns FC	Virginia	
(United States)	Ashley Herndon	M	Portland Thorns FC	James Madison	
(United States)	Kelli Hubly*	D	Portland Thorns FC	DePaul	
(United States)	Sydney Miramontez	D	FC Kansas City	Nebraska	
(United States)	Crystal Thomas	F	Washington Spirit	Georgetown	

== Trades ==
Round 1:

Round 2:

Round 3:

Round 4:

== Summary ==
In 2017, a total of 22 colleges had players selected. Of these, five had a player drafted to the NWSL for the first time: Clemson, Harvard, Minnesota, Ohio State and UConn.

=== Schools with multiple draft selections ===
Selections	Schools
5	USC
3	Clemson
2	Boston College, BYU, California, Duke, Florida, Nebraska, Ohio State, Rutgers, Stanford, UCLA, UConn, Virginia

=== Selections by college athletic conference ===
Conference	Round 1	Round 2	Round 3	Round 4	Total
ACC	1	2	3	4	10
Big East	0	3	0	0	3
Big Ten	1	1	3	4	9
Ivy League	1	0	1	0	2
Pac-12	6	2	2	2	12
SEC	0	1	1	0	2
West Coast	1	1	0	0	2

=== Selections by position ===
Position	Round 1	Round 2	Round 3	Round 4	Total
Goalkeeper	0	1	1	1	3
Defender	4	1	0	3	8
Midfielder	3	1	3	4	11
Forward	3	7	6	2	18

== See also ==
- List of NWSL drafts
- List of National Women's Soccer League draftees by college team
- 2016 National Women's Soccer League season
