= Lindsay Agnew =

Canadian soccer forward

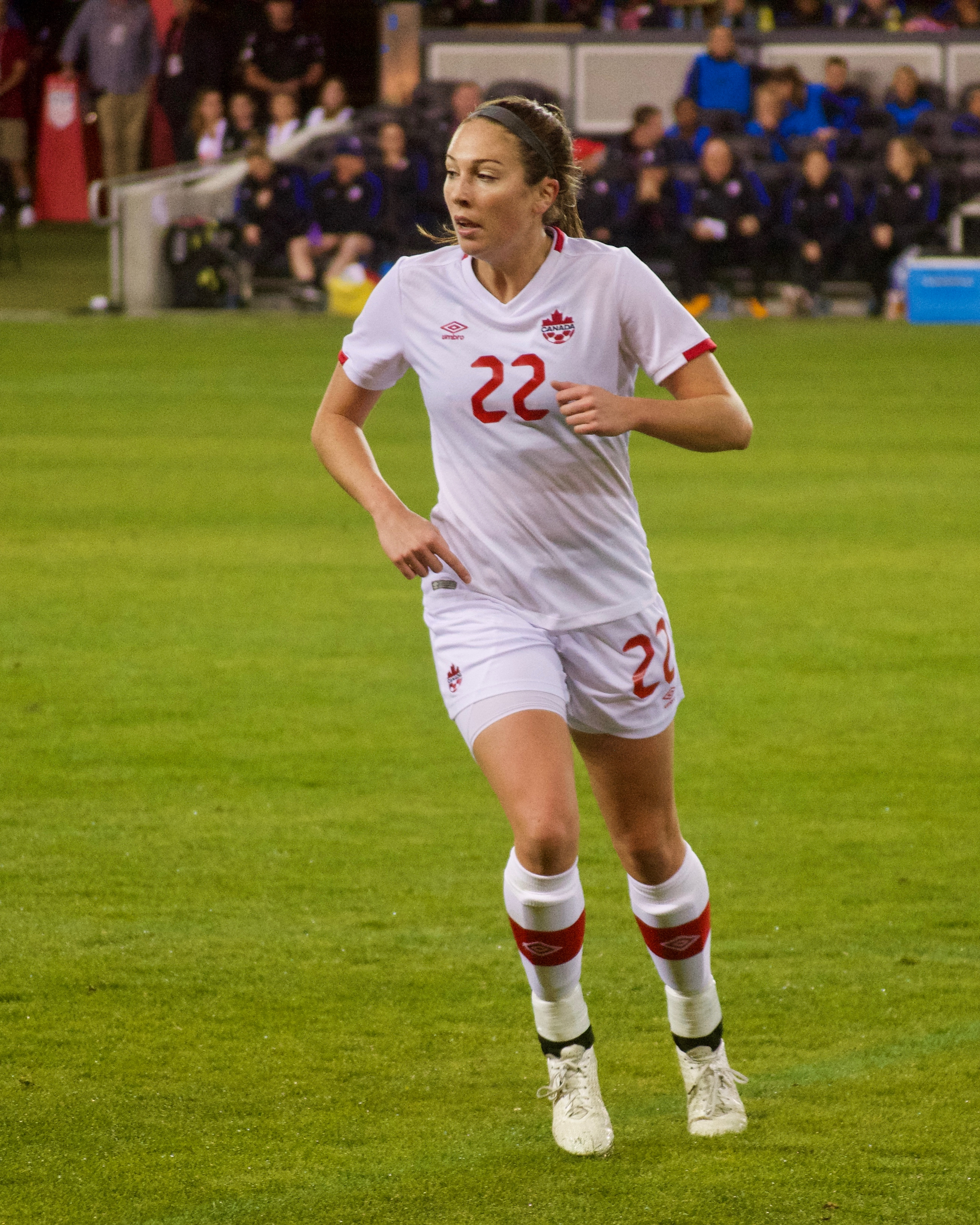
- Lindsay Agnew in 2017

Personal information
- Full name: Lindsay Elizabeth Agnew
- Date of birth: March 31, 1995 (age 31)
- Place of birth: Kingston, Ontario, Canada
- Height: 5 ft 9 in (1.75 m)
- Position: Forward

Youth career
- Byron Optimist SC
- Ohio Premier Eagles

College career
Years	Team	Apps	(Gls)
2013–2016	Ohio State Buckeyes	72	(18)

Senior career*
Years	Team	Apps	(Gls)
2017	Washington Spirit	8	(0)
2018–2019	Houston Dash	19	(0)
2020	Sydney FC	5	(0)
2020–2022	North Carolina Courage	1	(0)
2020	→ KIF Örebro (loan)	13	(0)
Total		46	(0)

International career
2012	Canada U17	7	(0)
2014	Canada U20	1	(0)
2017–2021	Canada	15	(0)
- * Club domestic league appearances and goals

Lindsay Elizabeth Agnew (born March 31, 1995) is a Canadian retired soccer player who played as a forward for the Canada women's national soccer team and National Women's Soccer League clubs North Carolina Courage, Houston Dash, and Washington Spirit.

== Early life ==
Born in Kingston, Ontario, Agnew began playing soccer at age four. Her family moved to Syracuse, New York in 2001, and moved again to Columbus, Ohio in 2006. She attended Dublin Jerome High School in Dublin, Ohio where she played on the varsity soccer team all four years of her high school career. She also played basketball. After helping the team reach the state finals during her junior year, Agnew was named to first team All-Ohio and ESPNHS second team All-American.

Agnew played club soccer for Ohio Premier for five years and helped the team win the U-18 ECNL national championship in 2013.

=== College ===
Agnew played college soccer at Ohio State University from 2013 to 2016.

== Club career ==
=== Washington Spirit ===
Agnew was selected by the Washington Spirit as the 19th overall pick in the 2017 NWSL College Draft. She would make 8 appearances in her first professional season.

=== Houston Dash ===
In January 2018, Agnew was traded to the Houston Dash in exchange for the third overall pick of the 2018 NWSL College Draft. She was waived by the Dash on January 22, 2020.

=== Sydney FC ===
Agnew signed with Sydney FC of the Australian W-League in the middle of the 2019-20 W-League season on January 28, 2020. She started in 5 matches, playing 450 minutes, and recorded 1 assist.

=== North Carolina Courage ===
Agnew was named as a non-roster invitee on the preseason roster of the North Carolina Courage of the NWSL on March 9, 2020. On June 19, 2020, Agnew signed a one-year contract, with a one-year option to extend, with the Courage. Upon conclusion of the 2020 NWSL Challenge Cup, Agnew would be loaned to Damallsvenskan club KIF Örebro DFF for the remainder of the season.

=== Retirement ===
On March 11, 2022, Agnew announced her retirement from professional soccer.

== International career ==
Agnew received her first call-up to the Canada senior national team in January 2017. On May 25, 2019, she was named to the roster for the 2019 FIFA Women's World Cup.

== Career statistics ==
=== Club ===
Appearances and goals by club, season and competition
Club	Season	League		
Club	Season	League	Apps	Goals
Washington Spirit	2017	NWSL	8	0
Houston Dash	2018	NWSL	12	0
Houston Dash	2019	NWSL	7	0
Sydney FC	2019–20	W-League	5	0
North Carolina Courage	2020	NWSL Challenge Cup	0	0
Career totals			32	0

=== International ===
Appearances and goals by national team and year
Canada
Year	Apps	Goals
2017	7	0
2018	3	0
2019	4	0
Total	14	0

== Personal life ==
Her father, Gary Agnew, is an ice hockey coach.
