= Morgan Proffitt =

American soccer player

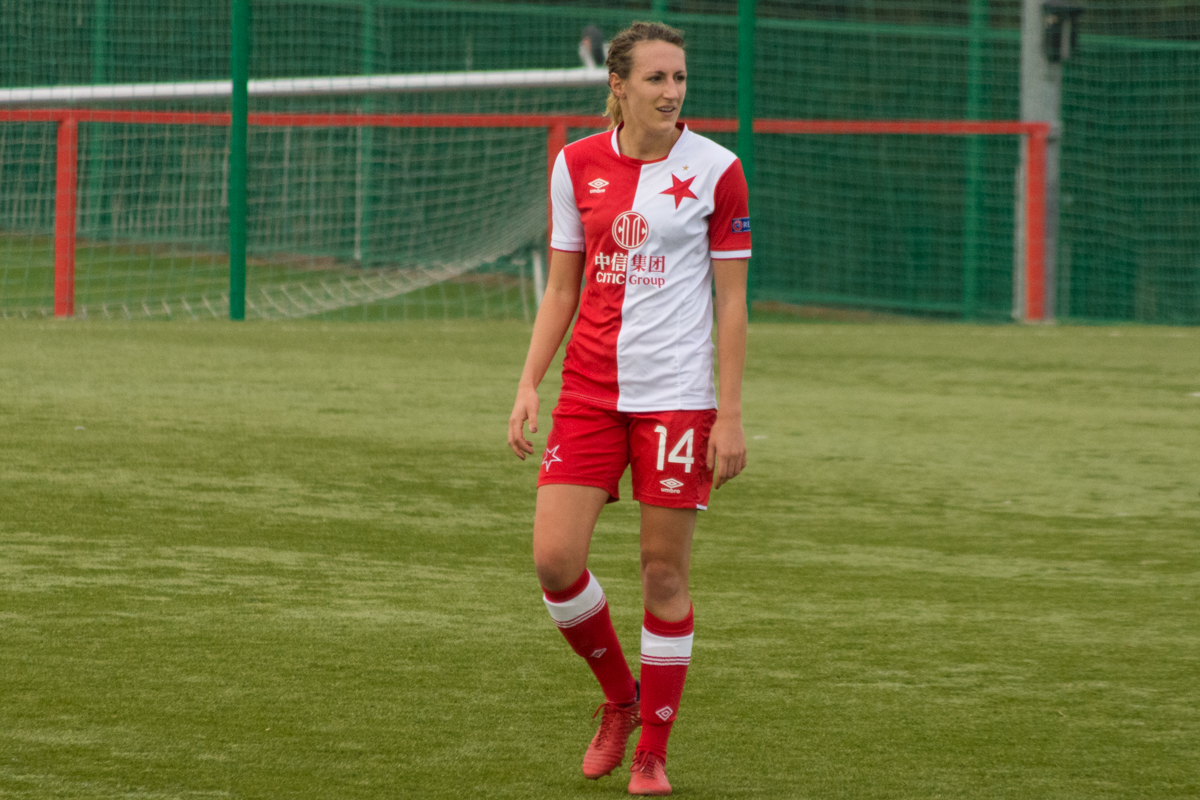

Personal information
- Full name: Morgan Elizabeth Proffitt
- Date of birth: August 22, 1994 (age 32)
- Place of birth: Columbus, Indiana, United States
- Height: 5 ft 10 in (1.78 m)
- Position: Midfielder

Youth career
- Columbus North High School
- Carmel United Soccer Club

College career
Years	Team	Apps	(Gls)
2013–2016	Marquette Golden Eagles	85	(10)

Senior career*
Years	Team	Apps	(Gls)
2017	Chicago Red Stars	7	(0)
2017–2018	Washington Spirit	7	(0)
2018	Slavia Praha	10	(5)
2019	Reign FC	6	(0)

International career
2012	United States U18		
2016–2017	United States U23		
- * Club domestic league appearances and goals as of 23:35, 6 February 2020 (UTC)

Morgan Elizabeth Proffitt (born August 22, 1994) is a former American soccer player who lastly played for Reign FC in the NWSL. She previously played for SK Slavia Praha in the Czech First Division and the Washington Spirit and Chicago Red Stars in the NWSL. She now works for Lexington Sporting Club, a new USL One team. She handles the social media and marketing and coaches.

== Early years ==
Proffitt had a standout career at high school. Playing for Columbus North High School she reached several accomplishments and earned several honors. Her team won three consecutive sectional and regional titles and three consecutive semi-state appearances, reaching the state finals in 2010. Proffitt was nominated three times first team all-state and all-district and conference player. She was also nominated Gatorade Player of the Year in 2011 and 2012. While at Columbus North HS, she scored 31 goals and notched 26 assists.

== College career ==
Proffitt played 85 (starting 83) matches and scored 10 goals for Marquette Golden Eagles. She earned several honours, including nominations for the BIG EAST All-Academic Team three season in a row (2013–14, 2014–15, 2015–16), MAC Hermann Trophy Watch List in 2016. In the same year, Proffitt was elected BIG EAST Conference Player of the Year. She was also nominated for the TopDrawerSoccer Team of the Week (11/1/16) and All-BIG EAST First Team in 2015 and 2016, among others honours.

== Club career ==
=== Chicago Red Stars, 2017 ===
While still in the college, Proffitt played two seasons (2015 and 2016) with the Chicago Red Stars Reserves at Women's Premier Soccer League. In 2015, she was part of the team that claimed the WPSL title. In the 2017 NWSL College Draft, the Chicago Red Stars picked Proffitt and she became the 12th overall pick. On April 22, 2017, Proffitt made her debut in the NWSL, replacing Sofia Huerta in 87th minute of the match against FC Kansas City.

=== Washington Spirit, 2017–2018 ===
In August 2017, Chicago Red Stars waived Proffitt to make space on the roster for Kristie Mewis and she was subsequently picked up by Washington Spirit. On June 19, 2018, the Washington Spirit announced they had released Proffitt, allowing her to pursue an opportunity in Europe.

=== SK Slavia Praha, 2018 ===
On June 26, 2018, it was announced that Proffitt was joining SK Slavia Praha in the Czech First Division.

=== Reign FC, 2019 ===
Proffitt signed with Reign FC for the 2019 NWSL season.

== International career ==
In 2012, Proffitt was called for the United States U18 team, however four days before the camp starts she tore her anterior cruciate ligament.

In May 2016, Proffitt was included in the 20-players roster that travelled to England to play in the Nordic Tournament.

In January 2017, Proffitt was called for a United States U23 camp training that took place at the U.S. Soccer National Training Center in Carson, California. The camp involved several prominent young players and many training sessions were observed by Jill Ellis and her staff.
