= Line Sigvardsen Jensen =

Danish footballer (born 1991)

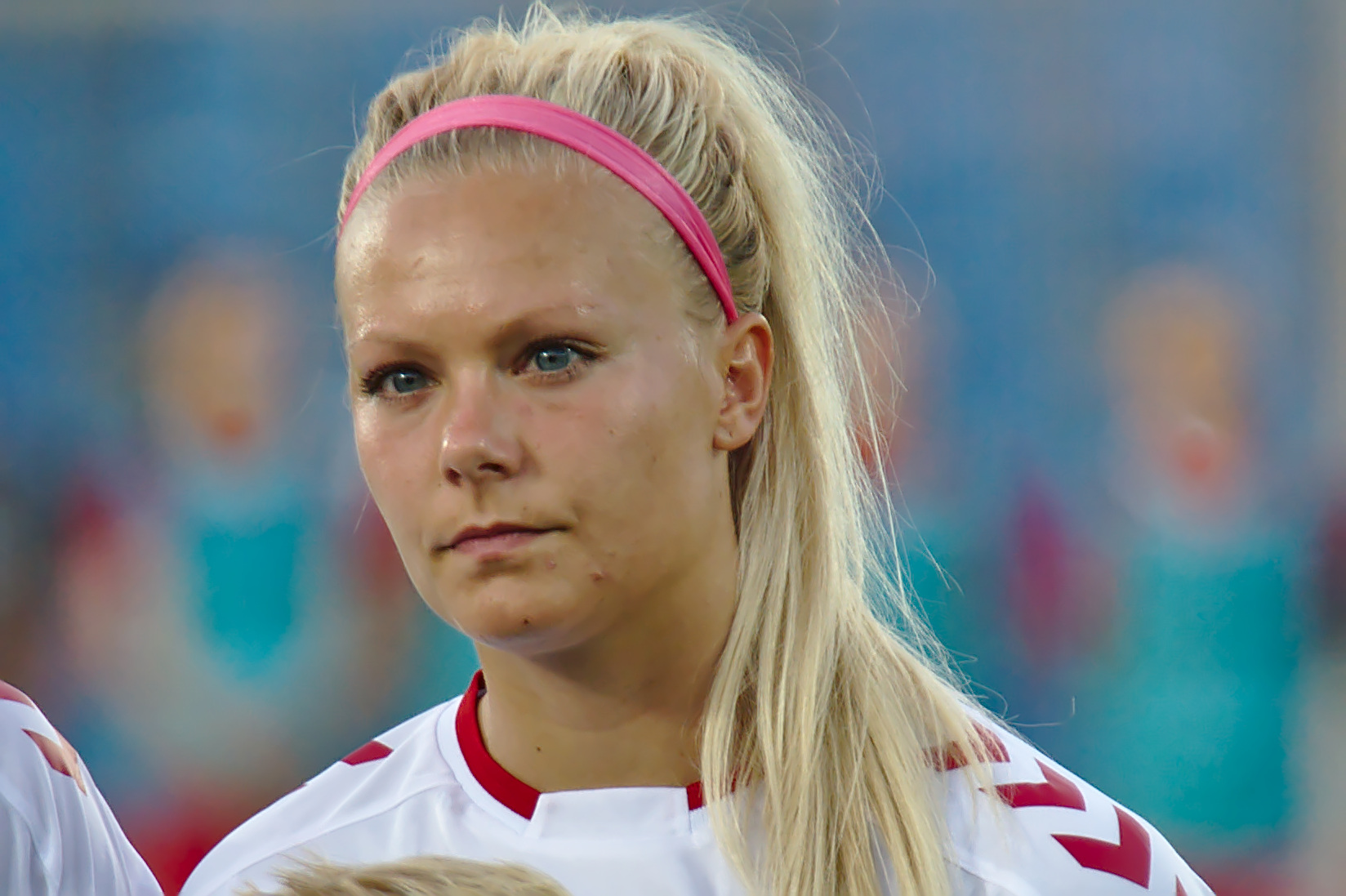

Personal information
- Full name: Line Sigvardsen Jensen
- Date of birth: 23 August 1991 (age 35)
- Place of birth: Farsø, Denmark
- Height: 1.68 m (5 ft 6 in)
- Position: Midfielder

Youth career
- 1999–2002: Hornum IF
- 2002–2006: Aars IK

Senior career*
Years	Team	Apps	(Gls)
2006–2008	B52/Aalborg		
2009–2016	Fortuna Hjørring	240	(4)
2016–2017	Washington Spirit	12	(1)
2017–2018	Fortuna Hjørring		

International career
2006–2008	Denmark U-17	25	(0)
2008–2010	Denmark U-19	28	(0)
2009–	Denmark	66	(2)
Medal record
Women's football
Representing Denmark
UEFA Women's Championship
Silver medal – second place	2017 Netherlands	Team
- * Club domestic league appearances and goals

Line Sigvardsen Jensen (born 23 August 1991) is a Danish nurse and former professional footballer who played as a midfielder for the Denmark national team. Jensen spent most of her senior career with A-Liga club Fortuna Hjørring, with which she won the league four times, including The Double in 2016 with the Danish Cup title. She was part of the 2017 Euros squad that won silver. Jensen quietly retired her active playing career around 2018 following an ACL injury sustained during the 2017 Euros. Jensen earned 66 caps total for the national team.

== Club career ==
Sigvardsen Jensen, originally a centre back, has played for Fortuna Hjørring since October 2008. She began playing football aged 9 in her native Himmerland.

She was signed by NWSL team Washington Spirit in July 2016. In her first season with the team, she played in three matches, two starts, totalling 141 minutes. Sigvardsen Jensen scored her first career NWSL goal on 22 April 2017 giving her team a 1–0 lead over the Orlando Pride. At the conclusion of the 2017 season, Jensen was waived by the Spirit.

== International career ==
Sigvardsen Jensen captained Denmark to a quarter final place at the 2008 FIFA U-17 Women's World Cup in New Zealand.

A 15–0 win over Georgia in October 2009 was Sigvardsen Jensen's senior international debut. She was called up to be part of the national team for the UEFA Women's Euro 2013.

== International goals ==
No.	Date	Venue	Opponent	Score	Result	Competition
1.	21 September 2011	Mika Stadium, Yerevan, Armenia	Armenia	4–0	5–0	UEFA Women's Euro 2013 qualifying

== Honours ==
Fortuna Hjørring

- A-Liga
  - Winners: 2009–10, 2010–11, 2013–14, 2015–16
  - Runners-up: 2011–12, 2012–13, 2014–15
- Danish Cup:
  - Winners: 2015–16
  - Runners-up: 2012–13, 2014–15
