= Francisca Ordega =

Nigerian footballer

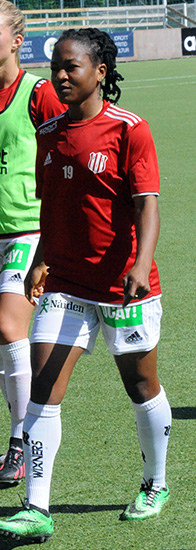
- Ordega with Piteå IF in 2014

Personal information
- Full name: Francisca Ordega
- Date of birth: 19 October 1993 (age 33)
- Place of birth: Gboko, Benue State, Nigeria
- Height: 1.60 m (5 ft 3 in)
- Position: Forward

Team information
- Current team: Al-Ittihad
- Number: 17

Senior career*
Years	Team	Apps	(Gls)
2008–2011	Bayelsa Queens		
2011–2012	Rivers Angels		
2012–2013	Rossiyanka		
2013–2014	Piteå IF	34	(4)
2015–2018	Washington Spirit	41	(9)
2016–2017	→ Sydney FC (loan)	6	(1)
2017–2018	→ Atlético Madrid (loan)	8	(0)
2019–2021	Shanghai Shengli		
2021	Levante	3	(0)
2021–2025	CSKA Moscow	62	(24)
2025–	Al-Ittihad	20	(7)

International career^{‡}
2010	Nigeria U17		
2012	Nigeria U20		
2010–	Nigeria	55	(7)
- * Club domestic league appearances and goals as of 18 August 2026 ‡ National team caps and goals as of 18 August 2026

Francisca Ordega OON (born 19 October 1993) is a Nigerian professional footballer who plays as a forward for Saudi Women's Premier League club Al-Ittihad.

She represents Nigeria women's national football team (Super Falcons) at both the FIFA Women's World Cup and African Women's Championship. She has been nominated for the best female African footballer.

== Playing career ==
=== Club ===
==== Bayelsa Queens ====
Ordega began her career at the youth level for Bayelsa Queens, before being promoted to the professional side in 2008 where she played at Nigerian Women's Championship.

==== Rivers Angels ====
In 2011, she moved to Rivers Angels, one of the top clubs in Nigerian Women's Championship.

==== WFC Rossiyanka ====
In 2012, Ordega left Nigeria to sign with Russian champions Rossiyanka of the Russian Women's Football Championship. In November 2012, it was announced that Ordega and Rossiyanka had mutually parted ways.

==== Piteå IF ====
In 2013, Ordega signed for Piteå IF in the Swedish Damallsvenskan. She scored her first goal on 26 May 2013 in a draw against Vittsjö GIK. Between 2013 and 2015, she made 34 appearances and scored 4 goals during her time in Sweden.

==== Washington Spirit ====
Ordega then moved across the North Atlantic and signed with Washington Spirit in the National Women's Soccer League. In her first season with the Spirit, Ordega scored three goals and made two assists. She returned in 2016 to score two goals during the regular season. The Nigerian's most memorable Spirit goal came in the NWSL Semifinal when she scored in extra time to send the Spirit to its first ever NWSL Championship.

In July 2017, Ordega suffered a knee injury that would limit her minutes for the remainder of the season. Despite the injury, she would still earn 14 appearances and scoring 4 goals.

===== Loan to Sydney FC =====
In December 2016, Sydney FC signed Ordega on loan from Washington for the remainder of the 2016–17 W-League season. The loan made her the first African to play in the Australian W-League. Ordega would make six appearances and score once helping Sydney earn 3rd place in the league.

===== Loan to Atlético Madrid =====
On 20 October 2017, Ordega joined Spanish club Atlético Madrid on a six-month loan from Washington. She made her debut on 1 November 2017 against Barcelona.

===== Move to Shanghai WFC =====
Ordega secured a one-year move to Shanghai WFC

===== Levante UD =====
In April 2021, Ordega signed a deal with Levante UD running until 2023, in an attempt to boost their pursuit of qualifying for Champions League football for the first time in their history. Ordega made her debut on 22 May 2021 against Madrid CFF, coming an as a substitute in the 67th minute in a 3–2 victory.

== International career ==
Ordega represented the Nigeria women's national football team in all levels. With the under 17, she played the 2010 FIFA U-17 Women's World Cup and with the under 20 at 2012 FIFA U-20 Women's World Cup. At senior level she played in the FIFA Women's World Cup tournaments of 2011, 2015 and 2019. At the latter she opened her World Cup account by scoring Nigeria's equalizing goal against Sweden on 8 June 2015 in Winnipeg, Manitoba, Canada. The pulsating match ended 3–3 in the opening game of Group D.

She was also part of Nigeria's squads at the African Women's Championship of 2010 and 2014, winning both tournaments.

In 2018, She was also a member of the Nigerian squad who won the 2018 Africa Women Cup of Nations in Ghana, A tournament where she had two goals and two assists and won the woman of the match award at the final game against South Africa. She was part of the Super Falcons squad that won the 2021 Turkish Women's Cup in Antalya, Turkey in February and thereby becoming the first African team to win the invitational tournament.

On 16 June 2023, she was included in the 23-player Nigerian squad for the FIFA Women's World Cup 2023.

=== International goals ===
Scores and results list Nigeria's goal tally first

No.	Date	Venue	Opponent	Score	Result	Competition
1	1 November 2010	Sinaba Stadium, Daveyton, South Africa	Mali	5–0	5–0	2010 African Women's Championship
2	17 October 2014	Sam Nujoma Stadium, Windhoek, Namibia	Namibia	2–0	2–0	2014 African Women's Championship
3	8 June 2015	Winnipeg Stadium, Winnipeg, Canada	Sweden	3–3	3–3	2015 FIFA Women's World Cup
4	20 November 2016	Stade Municipal de Limbe, Limbe, Cameroon	Mali	1–0	6–0	2016 Africa Women Cup of Nations
5	21 November 2018	Cape Coast Sports Stadium, Cape Coast, Ghana	Zambia	2–0	4–0	2018 Africa Women Cup of Nations
6	24 November 2018	Cape Coast Sports Stadium, Cape Coast, Ghana	Equatorial Guinea	1–0	6–0	2018 Africa Women Cup of Nations

== Honours ==
Rivers Angels

- Nigerian Women's Cup: 2012

Atlético Madrid

- Primera División: 2017–18

CSKA Moscow

- Russian Women's Cup: 2022, 2023
- Russian Women's Super Cup: 2024

Nigeria

- Women's Africa Cup of Nations: 2010, 2014, 2016, 2018, 2024

Orders

- Officer of the Order of the Niger
