= Arielle Ship =

American soccer player

Personal information
- Full name: Arielle Leah Ship
- Date of birth: May 2, 1995 (age 31)
- Place of birth: Westlake Village, California, United States
- Height: 5 ft 7 in (1.70 m)
- Position: Forward

College career
Years	Team	Apps	(Gls)
2013–2016	Cal Golden Bears	72	(29)

Senior career*
Years	Team	Apps	(Gls)
2017–2019	Washington Spirit	24	(2)
2020	Utah Royals	3	(0)
2021	Kansas City	0	(0)
2022	IFK Kalmar	0	(0)

International career
2011–2012	United States U17		
2017	United States U23		
- * Club domestic league appearances and goals as of 24 June 2023

Arielle Leah Ship (born May 2, 1995) is a former American women's soccer player who most recently played as a forward for Swedish club IFK Kalmar in the top-flight Damallsvenskan. She was the recipient of the California Golden Bears' first ever Pac-12 Player of the Year Award in 2015.

== Club career ==
Ship was drafted by Seattle Reign FC in the 2017 NWSL College Draft. Reign FC then traded Ship along with a 2018 NWSL College Draft pick to the Washington Spirit in exchange for Diana Matheson.

On August 8, 2017, Ship was named NWSL Player of the Week after scoring a goal and adding two assists in a 4–1 Spirit win over Sky Blue FC. On August 26, 2017, Ship suffered a torn right anterior cruciate ligament during a game against the Chicago Red Stars and missed the remainder of the 2017 season.

After being waived by the Spirit in 2019, Utah Royals FC selected her from the league re-entry wire on November 5, 2019. After the Royals dissolved in 2020, its player rights were relocated to expansion team Kansas City NWSL, including Ship's, in December 2020.

In December 2021, she left the Kansas City Current without making an appearance having agreed to join the Swedish team IFK Kalmar in November. She left IFK Kalmar in June 2022 without making an appearance for the team.

== International career ==
In February 2017, Ship was named to the United States women's national under-23 soccer team for the friendly La Manga Tournament against Japan, England, and Norway.

== After soccer ==
In 2023, Ship became a sales representative for an interior design company in California.

In 2022, Ship was inducted into the Southern California Jewish Sports Hall of Fame.
