= Whitney Church =

American soccer player (born 1993)

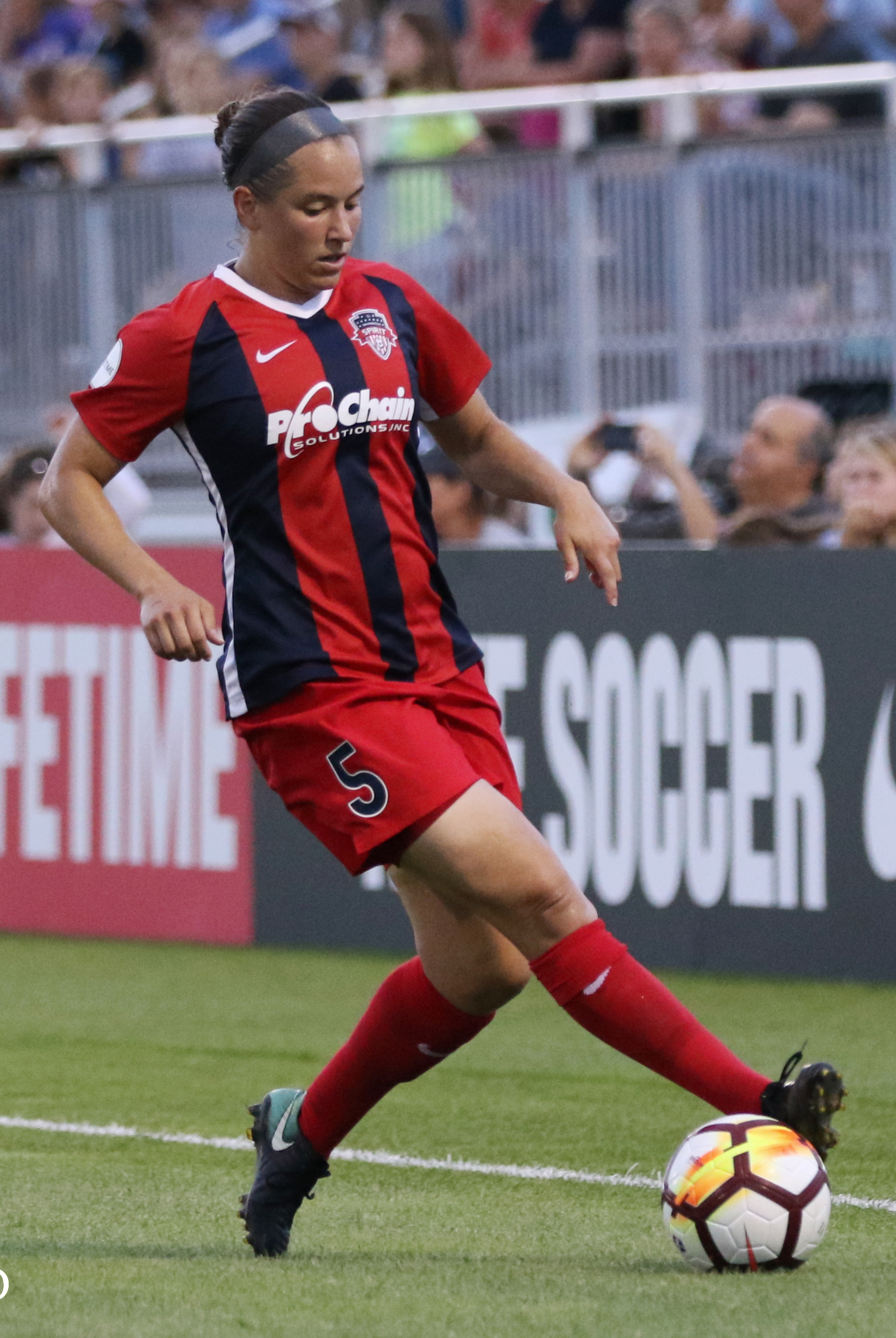
- Church with the Washington Spirit in 2018

Personal information
- Full name: Whitney Marie Church
- Date of birth: April 30, 1993 (age 33)
- Place of birth: Fairfax, Virginia, United States
- Height: 1.65 m (5 ft 5 in)
- Position: Defender

College career
Years	Team	Apps	(Gls)
2011–2014	Penn State Nittany Lions	100	(9)

Senior career*
Years	Team	Apps	(Gls)
2015–2018	Washington Spirit	71	(1)
- * Club domestic league appearances and goals

Whitney Marie Church (born April 30, 1993) is an American professional soccer player who played for the Washington Spirit in the National Women's Soccer League (NWSL).

== Playing career ==
=== Penn State Nittany Lions, 2011–2014 ===
Church attended Penn State University, where she played for the Nittany Lions from 2011 to 2014. She was named Big Ten Conference Defender of the Year in 2012 and 2014.

=== Washington Spirit, 2015–2018 ===
In 2015, Church was selected by the Washington Spirit as the 30th overall pick in the 2015 NWSL College Draft. Church played in 16 games in the regular 2015 season, totaling 1364 minutes for the Spirit. In 2016, she played in 11 regular season games, 7 starts, plus all 120+ minutes of both post season matches. On October 28, 2016, the club announced that Church had re-signed for the 2017 NWSL season.

In 2017, during her third season, Church appeared in 22 games, totaling 1,980 minutes of playing time. She was named the NWSL Player of the Week for Week 20 of the season. This selection was made after she scored the first goal of her NWSL career to rally her team to a 2–1 win over Sky Blue FC on the road.

During the 2018 season, she appeared in 22-of-24 regular season games with 1,898 minutes of playing time. She finished second on the team with 103 defensive clears.

On February 27, 2019, the Washington Spirit announced that the team had waived Church.
