= Stephanie Labbé =

Canadian soccer player (born 1986)

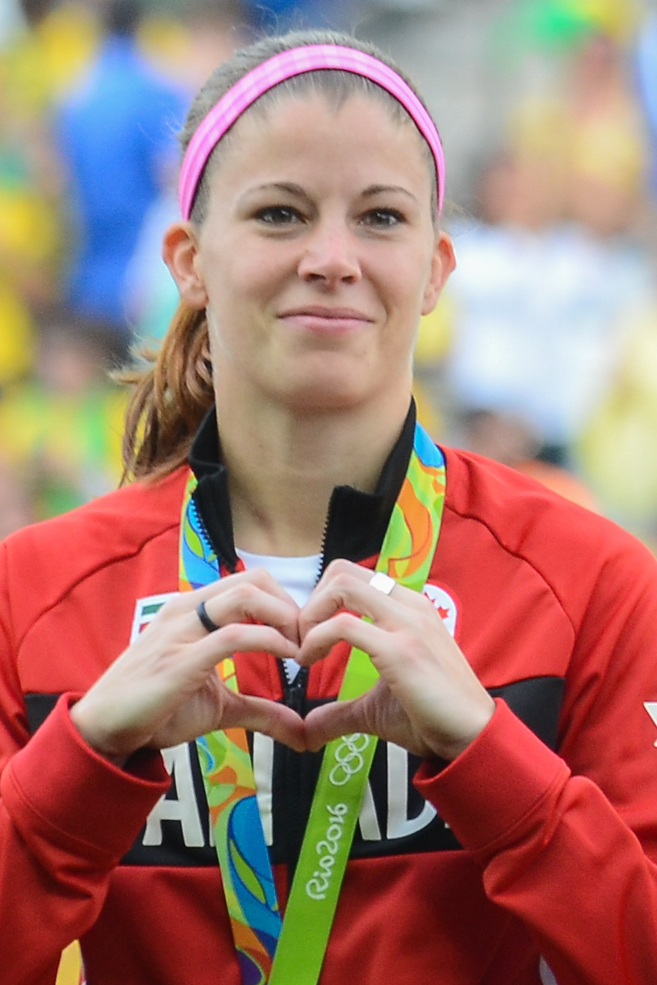
- Labbé with Canada in 2016

Personal information
- Full name: Stephanie Lynn Marie Labbé
- Date of birth: October 10, 1986 (age 40)
- Place of birth: Edmonton, Alberta, Canada
- Height: 1.78 m (5 ft 10 in)
- Position: Goalkeeper

Youth career
- Spruce Grove Saints
- Millwoods Warriors
- Edmonton Aviators

College career
| Years | Team | Apps | (Gls) |
| 2005–2008 | Connecticut Huskies | | |

Senior career*
| Years | Team | Apps | (Gls) |
| 2006–2008 | New England Mutiny | 21 | (0) |
| 2009–2011 | Piteå IF | 37 | (0) |
| 2012–2014 | KIF Örebro | 61 | (0) |
| 2016–2017 | Washington Spirit | 25 | (0) |
| 2018 | Calgary Foothills WFC | 6 | (0) |
| 2018 | Linköpings FC | 9 | (0) |
| 2019–2020 | North Carolina Courage | 18 | (0) |
| 2021 | Rosengård | 10 | (0) |
| 2021–2022 | Paris Saint-Germain | 3 | (0) |

International career
| 2004 | Canada U19 | 1 | (0) |
| 2006 | Canada U20 | 4 | (0) |
| 2015 | Canada Pan-Am | 4 | (0) |
| 2008–2022 | Canada | 86 | (0) |
Medal record
Women's football
Representing Canada
Olympic Games
| Gold medal – first place | 2020 Tokyo | Team |
| Bronze medal – third place | 2016 Rio de Janeiro | Team |
CONCACAF W Championship
| Silver medal – second place | 2018 United States |
- * Club domestic league appearances and goals

Stephanie Lynn Marie Labbé (born October 10, 1986) is a Canadian former professional soccer player who played as a goalkeeper.

She won a bronze medal with Canada at the 2016 Rio Olympics, the NWSL Championship with the Courage in 2019, and a gold medal with Canada at the 2020 Summer Olympics.

== College career ==
Labbé joined UConn's Huskies women's soccer team in the second semester of 2004. In 2005, she played in all 22 games of the season, starting in nine. Labbé emerged as the top keeper in 2005 and played every minute of the last three games of the season. She posted a 1.15 goals against average and a 4–3 record, made a total of 65 saves, played in 12 conference games, allowing only seven goals and stopping 32 shots.

In 2006, Labbé played in all 21 season games, and made the start in 20 of those. She finished the season with a 10–7–4 record and a 0.96 goals against average. Some of her other highlights: made 73 saves and allowed only 20 goals in just over 1879 minutes logged, collected four individual shutouts and was part of a Husky team that recorded five straight blankings, posted a scoreless streak of 461:63 consecutive minutes over a six-game span, and was named Big East Goalkeeper of the Week on October 16.

In 2007, Labbé played all 22 games in her junior year, and played every minute in goal that season. She finished with a 14–6–2 record, and a career best 0.61 goals against average. Some of her highlights are: making 71 saves and allowing only 14 goals in 2058 minutes of action, collected 11 shutouts over the course of the year, recorded first career assist on game-winning goal against Providence, and earned three shutouts in the NCAA tournament against first round foe Boston College, in the second round against Wake Forest and against third round opponent Stanford.

In 2008, Labbe was named Big East Goalkeeper of the Year. Labbe took and made penalty kicks for the Huskies to help them advance in the 2007 NCAA Tournament over Boston College and the 2008 Big East Tournament over West Virginia.

== Club career ==
=== Piteå IF ===
Piteå IF is a Swedish club located in Piteå, currently playing in the country's highest league, Damallsvenskan. The team played in the highest league for the first time in the season of 2009, in which Labbé joined the team. After the club was relegated to Division 1, Labbé was one of three foreign players that stayed with the club and managed to rise up again to Damallsvenskan in the season of 2010. In 2011, Piteå and Labbé once again played in the highest league.

=== KIF Örebro ===
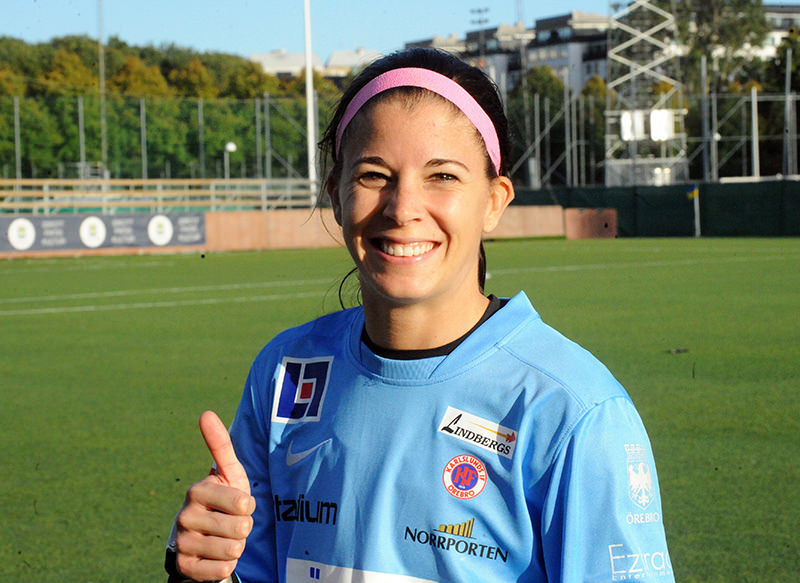
With Örebro in 2014

After three years in Piteå, Labbé moved to KIF Örebro for the 2012 season. In the 2014 season she picked up a silver medal with her KIF Örebro team when they finished 2nd in the Swedish top division. She was also nominated as one of three goalkeepers for the Swedish soccer awards in 2014.

=== Washington Spirit ===
On February 8, 2016, it was announced that Labbé would play for the Washington Spirit for the 2016 season of the National Women's Soccer League via the NWSL Player Allocation Labbé started and played in eight matches in 2016 and recorded a club record five shut outs in one season. She was named to the NWSL Team of the Month for April and June 2017.

In September 2017, Labbé announced she was taking a medical leave of absence from the Spirit for the remainder of the 2017 season. Although neither she nor the club specified the reason for the decision, she had spoken openly about her struggles with depression in the months leading up. In February 2018, the Spirit announced it would not retain the rights to Labbé.

=== Calgary Foothills ===
In March 2018, without a club since her release, Labbé joined Calgary Foothills F.C., a men's team, to train and attempt to make the team's roster. However, the Premier Development League responded that they are a gender-based men's league that does not allow women to play. In response, she filed suit against the league. Having been denied entry into the PDL, Labbé would sign with the women's side, Calgary Foothills WFC in United Women's Soccer.

She later wrote an article in The Players' Tribune detailing her experiences with the men's club in pre-season and with being denied entry, stating that:

I kept going. I didn't scale things back. I wanted to make that team so bad, and I loved the feeling that came along with not knowing how things would turn out. Of knowing that I needed to work harder than I had ever worked before if I was going to have a real shot. And the cool thing was that every day I could feel my legs getting stronger. My hands quicker. My passes smarter. I was proving to myself that I could hang. Something that seemed like it might be impossible when I started, was suddenly becoming very … real. And it became clear to me that in some ways I'd been selling myself short by assuming back then that I wouldn't be able to hack it on a men's team. After a while, I couldn't help but wonder where that self-doubt had come from in the first place. When did I start believing I was less of an athlete than the guys?

=== Linköpings FC ===
On July 10, 2018 it was announced that Labbé would be joining Linköpings in the Damallsvenskan in Sweden.

=== North Carolina Courage ===
On February 11, 2019 Coach Paul Riley announced that Stephanie Labbé would be joining the North Carolina Courage for the 2019 season, replacing Canadian Sabrina D'Angelo, who had left Carolina to sign with Vittsjö GIK in Sweden. She backstopped the Courage to a 2–1 victory over Portland Thorns FC in the opening match of the 2020 NWSL Challenge Cup.

=== FC Rosengård ===
After two years with North Carolina, Labbé would return to Sweden to sign with Damallsvenskan club FC Rosengård. She held six clean sheets in her first seven matches for Rosengård.

=== Paris Saint-Germain ===
On August 27, 2021, it was announced that Labbé signed with Paris Saint-Germain through June 2022 with an option for an extra year. On January 19, 2022, Labbé announced that she would retire from professional soccer at the end of the season.

== International career ==
Labbé made her first senior international appearance as a second-half substitute for Canada in an 8–0 win over Singapore on July 27, 2008.

Due to an injury to starting goalkeeper Erin McLeod, Labbé was named as the starting goalkeeper for Canada in the 2016 Rio Olympics. She kept two clean sheets during the tournament, backstopping Canada to a bronze medal.

On May 25, 2019, Labbé was named to the roster for the 2019 FIFA Women's World Cup.

On January 19, 2022, Labbé announced that she would retire from the national team in April 2022.

=== 2020 Summer Olympics ===
She was named to the Canadian roster for the 2020 Summer Olympics, serving as the starting goalkeeper. She suffered a rib injury partway through the opening match against Japan, missing a group stage game against Chile due to the injury. She then went on to post a clean sheet against Brazil in the quarterfinals and another clean sheet against the United States in the semi-finals. On August 6, 2021, she backstopped Canada to a gold medal, defeating Sweden in a penalty shootout. During the final penalty shootout, she was noted for her calm demeanor, grinning at the Swedish shooters and only conceding two of the six kicks. After Canada won the gold medal, Canada's Minister of National Defence Harjit Sajjan tweeted to her, stating "From one MND to another, thank you for defending the flag and for helping bring home this long awaited gold medal to Canada!", referring to edits on Labbé's Wikipedia article that changed her position on the field to "National Minister of Defence". She was one of seven finalists for the 2021 Lou Marsh Trophy, awarded annually to Canada's top athlete.

== Post-playing career ==
Labbé was appointed general manager of the Vancouver Whitecaps Girls Elite on October 6, 2022. She is the sporting director of Northern Super League team Vancouver Rise FC.

== Personal life ==
Labbé has been in a relationship with Canadian Olympic cyclist Georgia Simmerling since 2016. They were engaged in August 2021.

During her childhood, she played ice hockey with Spruce Grove Minor Hockey, eventually quitting the sport at the age of 11. She has spoken openly about her struggles with major depressive disorder.

== Career statistics ==
=== Club ===
As of December 16, 2021

| Club | League | Season | League | | Playoffs | | Domestic Cup | | Continental Cup | | Total | |
| Club | League | Season | Apps | Goals | Apps | Goals | Apps | Goals | Apps | Goals | Apps | Goals |
|---|---|---|---|---|---|---|---|---|---|---|---|---|
| Piteå IF | Damallsvenskan | 2009 | 20 | 0 | 0 | 0 | 0 | 0 | 0 | 0 | 20 | 0 |
| Piteå IF | Damallsvenskan | 2011 | 17 | 0 | 0 | 0 | 0 | 0 | 0 | 0 | 17 | 0 |
| Piteå IF | Total | | 37 | 0 | 0 | 0 | 0 | 0 | 0 | 0 | 37 | 0 |
| KIF Örebro | Damallsvenskan | 2012 | 21 | 0 | 0 | 0 | 2 | 0 | 0 | 0 | 23 | 0 |
| KIF Örebro | Damallsvenskan | 2013 | 21 | 0 | 0 | 0 | 4 | 0 | 0 | 0 | 25 | 0 |
| KIF Örebro | Damallsvenskan | 2014 | 20 | 0 | 0 | 0 | 1 | 0 | 0 | 0 | 21 | 0 |
| KIF Örebro | Total | | 62 | 0 | 0 | 0 | 7 | 0 | 0 | 0 | 69 | 0 |
| Washington Spirit | NWSL | 2016 | 8 | 0 | 0 | 0 | 0 | 0 | 0 | 0 | 8 | 0 |
| Washington Spirit | NWSL | 2017 | 17 | 0 | 0 | 0 | 0 | 0 | 0 | 0 | 17 | 0 |
| Washington Spirit | Total | | 25 | 0 | 0 | 0 | 0 | 0 | 0 | 0 | 25 | 0 |
| Calgary Foothills WFC | UWS | 2018 | 6 | 0 | 0 | 0 | 0 | 0 | 0 | 0 | 6 | 0 |
| Linköpings FC | Damallsvenskan | 2018 | 9 | 0 | 0 | 0 | 1 | 0 | 2 | 0 | 12 | 0 |
| North Carolina Courage | NWSL | 2019 | 16 | 0 | 1 | 0 | 0 | 0 | 0 | 0 | 17 | 0 |
| North Carolina Courage | NWSL | 2020 | 2 | 0 | 0 | 0 | 2 | 0 | 0 | 0 | 4 | 0 |
| North Carolina Courage | Total | | 18 | 0 | 1 | 0 | 2 | 0 | 0 | 0 | 21 | 0 |
| Rosengård | Damallsvenskan | 2021 | 10 | 0 | 0 | 0 | 3 | 0 | 4 | 0 | 17 | 0 |
| Paris Saint-Germain | D1 Féminine | 2021–22 | 3 | 0 | 0 | 0 | 0 | 0 | 3 | 0 | 6 | 0 |
| Career total | | | 169 | 0 | 1 | 0 | 13 | 0 | 9 | 0 | 192 | 0 |

== Honours ==
=== Club ===
North Carolina Courage

- NWSL Champions: 2019
- NWSL Shield: 2019

=== International ===
- Summer Olympics gold medal: 2021; bronze medal: 2016

=== Individual ===
- IFFHS Women's CONCACAF Team of the Year: 2021
