= Cali Farquharson =

American professional soccer player

Personal information
- Full name: Cali Jean Farquharson
- Date of birth: December 17, 1993 (age 32)
- Place of birth: Yokota, Japan
- Height: 5 ft 7 in (1.70 m)
- Position: Forward

College career
| Years | Team | Apps | (Gls) |
| 2012–2015 | Arizona State Sun Devils | 74 | (44) |

Senior career*
| Years | Team | Apps | (Gls) |
| 2016–2019 | Washington Spirit | 44 | (0) |
| 2020 | KIF Örebro | 19 | (3) |
| 2022 | Houston Dash | 6 | (0) |
- * Club domestic league appearances and goals

Cali Jean Farquharson (born December 17, 1993) is an American professional soccer player.

== Early life ==
Born in Yokota, Japan, Farquharson attended Shadow Mountain High School in Phoenix, Arizona, where she was named the most valuable player of the girls' soccer team during her freshman season. She led the team in goals during her junior year. In 2012, she was named to the East Valley Tribune's all-Division II second team.

Farquharson played club soccer for SC Del Sol '94 in the Elite Clubs National League (ECNL). She was twice named to the league's All-Event Team.

=== Arizona Sun Devils, 2012–2015 ===
Farquharson attended Arizona State University from 2012 to 2015 where she played for the Arizona State Sun Devils. In 2025 she was inducted into the Sun Devil Athletics' Hall of Fame.

== Club career ==
=== Washington Spirit, 2016–2019 ===
Farquharson was selected 12th overall by the Washington Spirit in the 2016 NWSL College Draft. She made her debut for the club during the season opener against Boston Breakers on April 16, 2016. In 2016, the rookie played in 16 games, 8 starts, totaling 561 minutes. She tore her left ACL during a match against Seattle Reign FC on September 7, 2016, which ended her first professional season.

Farquharson missed significant time in the 2018 season after suffering a left tibial stress injury. In February 2019, she re-signed with the Spirit. Farquharson went on to play 541 minutes with six starts in 2019. She was released by the club at the end of the 2019 season along with 8 other Washington Spirit players.

Following her release by the Spirit, Farquharson was selected in the End of Season Re-Entry wire by the Utah Royals in November 2019. She was subsequently waived by Utah in December 2019.
