= 2021 Racing Louisville FC season =

Racing Louisville FC 2021 soccer season

Racing Louisville
2021 season
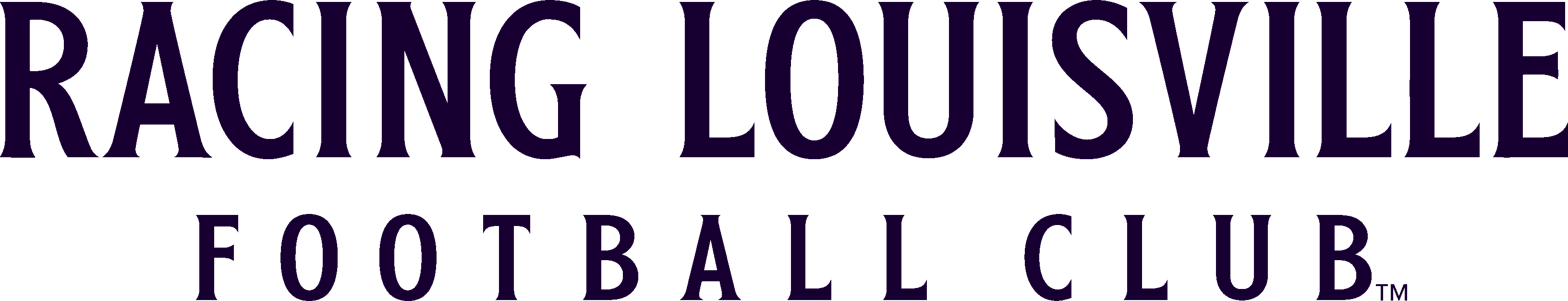
- Owner: John Neace
- Manager: Christy Holly (until Aug. 31); Mario Sanchez (interim)
- Stadium: Lynn Family Stadium
- NWSL: 9th
- NWSL Playoffs: DNQ
- Challenge Cup: 5th (East Div.)
- 2021 International Women's Cup: Champions
- Top goalscorer: League: Cece Kizer, Ebony Salmon (6); All: Cece Kizer (8)
- Highest home attendance: 8,488 (vs. ORL, October 16)
- Lowest home attendance: 5,843 (vs. KC, August 8)
- Average home league attendance: 6,565
- Biggest win: CHI 0 - 3 LOU (June 26)
- Biggest defeat: NCC 5 - 0 LOU (May 28)
| Home colours | Away colours |

The 2021 Racing Louisville FC season was the club's first season of play. Racing Louisville competed in the National Women's Soccer League, the top flight of professional women's soccer in the United States.

== Background ==
Racing Louisville FC was announced on October 22, 2019, as an NWSL expansion team set to begin play in the 2021 season. Former Sky Blue FC head coach Christy Holly was named as Racing Louisville FC's first head coach on August 12, 2020. The club proceeded to build their roster through a combination of free agent signings, a trade with Chicago Red Stars for Savannah McCaskill and Yūki Nagasato in exchange draft protection, the 2020 NWSL Expansion Draft, and the 2021 NWSL Draft. Since the opening of the season, Racing also added English internationals Gemma Bonner and Ebony Salmon, former North Carolina Courage defender Sinclaire Miramontez, and Dutch international Nadia Nadim.

Holly was fired for cause on August 31, 2021, and the club named Mario Sanchez, head of the club's youth academy and former collegiate coach, as the interim head coach.

== Current squad ==
As of June 9, 2021

| No. | Position | Player | Nation |
|---|---|---|---|
| 1 | GK | USA | Michelle Betos |
| 2 | MF | USA | Lauren Milliet |
| 3 | DF | USA | Erin Simon |
| 4 | DF | ENG | Gemma Bonner |
| 5 | FW | USA | Cece Kizer |
| 7 | FW | USA | Savannah McCaskill |
| 8 | MF | SWE | Freja Olofsson |
| 9 | FW | ENG | Ebony Salmon |
| 10 | FW | DEN | Nadia Nadim |
| 11 | DF | USA | Emily Fox |
| 12 | DF | USA | Sinclaire Miramontez |
| 13 | FW | USA | Emina Ekic |
| 14 | DF | USA | Nealy Martin |
| 15 | DF | USA | Brooke Hendrix |
| 16 | DF | USA | Julia Ashley |
| 17 | FW | JPN | Yūki Nagasato |
| 18 | DF | USA | Kaleigh Riehl |
| 19 | MF | USA | Taylor Otto |
| 20 | FW | JAM | Cheyna Matthews |
| 21 | GK | USA | Shelby Money |
| 22 | FW | USA | Katie McClure |
| 23 | GK | USA | Katie Lund |
| 24 | MF | USA | Noelle Higginson |
| 26 | DF | USA | Addisyn Merrick |
| 27 | FW | DOM | Vanessa Kara |
| 33 | FW | USA | Jorian Baucom |

== Competitions ==
=== Preseason friendlies ===
| February 27, 2021 | Racing Louisville | 4–0 | Louisville Cardinals | Louisville, Kentucky |
| | Milliet 5'; Kizer 22', 24', 49' | | | Stadium: Thurman Hutchins Park; Attendance: 0 |

| March 7, 2021 | Vanderbilt Commodores | 1–2 | Racing Louisville | Nashville, Tennessee |
| | Kelley 68' | | Milliet 43'; Kizer 49' (pen.) | Stadium: Vanderbilt Soccer/Lacrosse Complex; Attendance: 0 |

| March 13, 2021 | Racing Louisville | 4–0 | West Virginia Mountaineers | Louisville, Kentucky |
| | Ekic 17'; McClure 41', 59'; Baucom 83' | | | Stadium: Thurman Hutchins Park; Attendance: 0 |

| March 24, 2021 | Florida State Seminoles | v | Racing Louisville | Tallahassee, Florida |
| | | | | Stadium: Seminole Soccer Complex; Attendance: 0 |
Note: Result not reported

| March 28, 2021 | Florida State Seminoles | v | Racing Louisville | Tallahassee, Florida |
| | | | | Stadium: Seminole Soccer Complex |
Note: Result not reported

=== NWSL Challenge Cup ===
==== Standings — East Division ====
| Pos | Team | Pld | W | D | L | GF | GA | GD | Pts | Qualification |
|---|---|---|---|---|---|---|---|---|---|---|
| 1 | NJ/NY Gotham FC | 4 | 2 | 2 | 0 | 5 | 3 | +2 | 8 | Qualification for the Championship |
| 2 | North Carolina Courage | 4 | 2 | 1 | 1 | 9 | 8 | +1 | 7 | |
| 3 | Orlando Pride | 4 | 1 | 2 | 1 | 3 | 3 | 0 | 5 | |
| 4 | Washington Spirit | 4 | 1 | 1 | 2 | 3 | 4 | −1 | 4 | |
| 5 | Racing Louisville FC | 4 | 0 | 2 | 2 | 4 | 6 | −2 | 2 | |

Source: NWSL
Rules for classification: Tiebreakers

==== Match results ====
Racing Louisville's group stage matches in the East Division of the 2021 NWSL Challenge Cup were the first competitive matches in club history. The opening match, a 2–2 draw against Orlando Pride, was the club's first at their home ground, Lynn Family Stadium. With two draws and two losses in four group matches, Racing finished at the bottom of East Division in their first Challenge Cup.

| April 10, 2021 1 | Racing Louisville | 2–2 | Orlando Pride | Louisville, Kentucky |
| 7:00 PM ET | Kizer 12'; Fox (yellow card) 66'; Baucom (yellow card) 83'; Hendrix 90+3' | Report | Kornieck (yellow card) 35', (goal) 44'; Kim 88' | Stadium: Lynn Family Stadium; Attendance: 5,300; Referee: Katja Koroleva; Assistant referees: Brooke Mayo, Maggie Short; Fourth official: Nabil Bensalah |

| April 15, 2021 2 | Washington Spirit | 1–0 | Racing Louisville | Washington, D.C. |
| 7:00 PM ET | Roddar (yellow card) 59'; Huster (yellow card) 79'; Sanchez 90+3' | Report | Olofsson (yellow card) 52' | Stadium: Audi Field; Attendance: 0 Referee: Danielle Chesky; Assistant referees: Ben Pilgrim, Nicholas Seymour; Fourth official: Nabil Bensalah |

| April 26, 2021 3 | Racing Louisville | 2–3 | North Carolina Courage | Louisville, Kentucky |
| 6:00 PM ET | Kizer 24'; Baucom 75' | Report | Pickett (yellow card) 12'; Hamilton 33'; Kurtz (yellow card) 49'; Debinha 57'; Ashley 84' (o.g.) | Stadium: Lynn Family Stadium; Attendance: 3,742; Referee: Tori Penso; Assistant referees: Rebecca Luther, Maggie Short; Fourth official: Chris Schurfranz |

| May 2, 2021 4 | NJ/NY Gotham FC | 0–0 | Racing Louisville | Montclair, New Jersey |
| 12:30 PM ET | Cudjoe (yellow card) 28' | Report | | Stadium: MSU Soccer Park; Referee: Karen Abt; Assistant referees: Tiffini Turpin, Zeno Cho; Fourth official: Christian Centeno |

=== NWSL Regular Season ===
==== Standings ====
| Pos | Team | Pld | W | D | L | GF | GA | GD | Pts | Qualification |
|---|---|---|---|---|---|---|---|---|---|---|
| 1 | Portland Thorns FC | 24 | 13 | 5 | 6 | 33 | 17 | +16 | 44 | NWSL Shield |
| 2 | OL Reign | 24 | 13 | 3 | 8 | 37 | 24 | +13 | 42 | Playoffs – Semi-finals |
| 3 | Washington Spirit (C) | 24 | 11 | 6 | 7 | 29 | 26 | +3 | 39 | Playoffs – First round |
| 4 | Chicago Red Stars | 24 | 11 | 5 | 8 | 28 | 28 | 0 | 38 | Playoffs – First round |
| 5 | NJ/NY Gotham FC | 24 | 8 | 11 | 5 | 29 | 21 | +8 | 35 | Playoffs – First round |
| 6 | North Carolina Courage | 24 | 9 | 6 | 9 | 28 | 23 | +5 | 33 | Playoffs – First round |
| 7 | Houston Dash | 24 | 9 | 5 | 10 | 31 | 31 | 0 | 32 | |
| 8 | Orlando Pride | 24 | 7 | 7 | 10 | 27 | 32 | −5 | 28 | |
| 9 | Racing Louisville FC | 24 | 5 | 7 | 12 | 21 | 40 | −19 | 22 | |
| 10 | Kansas City | 24 | 3 | 7 | 14 | 15 | 36 | −21 | 16 | |

Source: NWSL
Rules for classification: Tiebreakers
(C) Champions

==== Results summary ====
| Overall | | | | | | | | Home | | | | | | Away | | | | | |
| Pld | W | D | L | GF | GA | GD | Pts | W | D | L | GF | GA | GD | W | D | L | GF | GA | GD |
|---|---|---|---|---|---|---|---|---|---|---|---|---|---|---|---|---|---|---|---|
| 24 | 5 | 7 | 12 | 21 | 40 | −19 | 22 | 4 | 4 | 4 | 12 | 15 | −3 | 1 | 3 | 8 | 9 | 25 | −16 |

Last updated: October 31, 2021.
Source: Match reports

| Round | 1 | 2 | 3 | 4 | 5 | 6 | 7 | 8 | 9 | 10 | 11 | 12 | 13 | 14 | 15 | 16 | 17 | 18 | 19 | 20 | 21 | 22 | 23 | 24 |
|---|---|---|---|---|---|---|---|---|---|---|---|---|---|---|---|---|---|---|---|---|---|---|---|---|
| Ground | H | H | A | A | H | H | A | H | A | H | A | H | A | H | A | A | H | A | H | H | A | A | H | A |
| Result | D | W | L | L | W | L | W | L | D | L | L | W | D | D | L | L | D | L | L | L | L | W | D | D |

Updated to match(es) played on October 31, 2021. Source: Match reports
A = Away; H = Home; W = Win; D = Draw; L = Loss

==== Match results ====
| 15 May 1 | Racing Louisville | 0–0 | Kansas City | Louisville, Kentucky |
| 5:00 PM ET | McCaskill (yellow card) 53' | Report | | Stadium: Lynn Family Stadium; Attendance: 6,622; Referee: Adorae Monroy; Assistant referees: Deleana Quan, Chris Schurfranz; Fourth official: Nabil Bensalah |

| 21 May 2 | Racing Louisville | 2–0 | Washington Spirit | Louisville, Kentucky |
| 7:30 PM ET | Ekic 76'; Kizer 81'; Baucom (yellow card) 90+1'; Martin (yellow card) 90+2' | Report | Rodman (yellow card) 46'; Bailey (yellow card) 70' | Stadium: Lynn Family Stadium; Attendance: 6,011; Referee: Katja Koroleva; Assistant referees: Melissa Beck, Maggie Short; Fourth official: Michael Samour |

| 28 May 3 | North Carolina Courage | 5–0 | Racing Louisville | Cary, North Carolina |
| 7:00 PM ET | Erceg 7'; Mathias (yellow card) 56'; L Williams 63'; Debinha 68'; Mace 75', 90' | Report | | Stadium: WakeMed Soccer Park; Attendance: Unreported; Referee: Matthew Franz; Assistant referees: Jeremy Smith, Caleb Fearing; Fourth official: Shawn Tehini |

| 5 June 4 | Portland Thorns FC | 3–0 | Racing Louisville | Portland, Oregon |
| 10:30 PM ET/7:30 PM PT | Salem 8'; Rodriguez 48'; Horan (yellow card) 72', (goal) 77' | Report | Martin (yellow card) 49'; McClure (yellow card) 85' | Stadium: Providence Park; Attendance: Not reported Referee: Samantha Martinez; Assistant referees: Salma Perez, Corbyn May; Fourth official: Luis Trujillo |

| 20 June 5 | Racing Louisville | 1–0 | Houston Dash | Louisville, Kentucky |
| 3:00 PM ET | Bonner (yellow card) 10'; Salmon 72' | Report | Latsko (yellow card) 7' | Stadium: Lynn Family Stadium; Attendance: 5,971; Referee: Laura Rodriguez; Assistant referees: Meghan Mullen, Maggie Short; Fourth official: Chris Schurfranz |

| 23 June 6 | Racing Louisville | 0–2 | North Carolina Courage | Louisville, Kentucky |
| 7:30 PM ET | Nagasato (yellow card) 65' | Report | L. Williams 27', 33' | Stadium: Lynn Family Stadium; Attendance: 6,334; Referee: Alyssa Nichols; Assistant referees: Kali Smith, Mike Nickerson; Fourth official: Michael Samour |

| 26 June 7 | Chicago Red Stars | 0–3 | Racing Louisville | Bridgeview, Illinois |
| 3:25 PM CT/4:25 PM ET (start delayed from 1:00 PM CT by weather) | Colaprico (yellow card) 10' (yellow-red card) 55' | Report | Nagasato (yellow card) 29', (goal) 56'; Salmon 38'; McCaskill 62' | Stadium: SeatGeek Stadium; Attendance: 2,626; Referee: Greg Dopka; Assistant referees: Melissa Beck, Rachel Smith; Fourth official: Katherine McCormick |

| 3 July 8 | Racing Louisville | 0–2 | Portland Thorns FC | Louisville, Kentucky |
| 7:30 PM ET | McCaskill (yellow card) 29'; Riehl (yellow card) 34'; Holly (yellow card) 77' | Report | Rodriguez 30' (pen.); Charley 52' | Stadium: Lynn Family Stadium; Attendance: 6,822; Referee: Karen Callado; Assistant referees: Brooke Mayo, Chris Schurfranz; Fourth official: Emma Richards |

| 9 July 9 | Orlando Pride | 1–1 | Racing Louisville | Orlando, Florida |
| 7:00 PM ET | Jónsdóttir (yellow card) 33'; Leroux 90+4' | Report | Salmon 21'; McCaskill (yellow card) 36'; Ekic (yellow card) 73'; Matthews (yellow card) 82' | Stadium: Exploria Stadium; Referee: Natalie Simon |

| 25 July 10 | Racing Louisville | 0–2 | Washington Spirit | Louisville, Kentucky |
| 7:30 PM ET (start delayed from 3:00 PM ET due to weather conditions) | | Report | Ashley Hatch 5'; Sam Staab 58'; Aubrey Bledsoe (yellow card) 90+1' | Stadium: Lynn Family Stadium; Attendance: 6,422; Referee: Samantha Martinez; Assistant referees: Tiffini Turpin, Mike Nickerson; Fourth official: Jarin Harrell |

| 31 July 11 | OL Reign | 2–0 | Racing Louisville | Tacoma, Washington |
| 7:00 PM PT/10:00 PM ET | Le Sommer 27', 43'; Huerta (yellow card) 86' | Report | | Stadium: Cheney Stadium; Attendance: 3,097; Referee: Laura Rodriguez |

| 8 August 12 | Racing Louisville | 3–1 | Kansas City | Louisville, Kentucky |
| 3:00 PM ET | Nadim (yellow card) 22', (goal) 55'; Fox (yellow card) 35'; McCaskill (yellow card) 38'; Salmon 43'; Matthews 86', (yellow card) 90' | Report | Pickett (yellow card) 45+1'; Jenkins 45+9'; LaBonta (yellow card) 63'; Silva (yellow card) 82' | Stadium: Lynn Family Stadium; Attendance: 5,843; Referee: Danielle Chesky |

| 15 August 13 | NJ/NY Gotham FC | 1–1 | Racing Louisville | Harrison, New Jersey |
| 5:00 PM ET | Onumonu 83' | Report | Nadim 13'; Bonner (yellow card) 67'; Riehl (yellow card) 90+6' | Stadium: Red Bull Arena; Attendance: 2,200; Referee: Brad Jensen; Assistant referees: Tyler Wyrostek, Ian Mangione; Fourth official: Jennifer Dumaine |

| 18 August 14 | Racing Louisville | 1–1 | Chicago Red Stars | Louisville, Kentucky |
| 8:20 PM ET | Salmon 10', (yellow card) 57'; Riehl (yellow card) 65'; Nagasato (yellow card) 90' | Report | Watt 57' | Stadium: Lynn Family Stadium; Attendance: 7,310; Referee: Karen Abt; Assistant referees: Kali Smith, Noah Matos; Fourth official: Katherine McCormick |
Note: A penalty kick shoot-out following full time was needed to decide a winner for the match's dual status as a semifinal of the inaugural International Women's Cup. Racing Louisville won the shoot-out 5 - 4.

| 25 August 15 | Kansas City | 2–1 | Racing Louisville | Kansas City, Kansas |
| 7:00 PM CT/8:00 PM ET | Ball (yellow card) 10'; Simon 17' (o.g.); Hamilton 40'; LaBonta (yellow card) 45+2'; Weber (yellow card) 50'; Vincent (yellow card) 79' | Report | Nadim (yellow card) 27'; Kizer 65'; S Miramontez (yellow card) 88' (yellow-red card) 90+1' | Stadium: Legends Field; Referee: Michael Radchuk |

| 29 August 16 | Houston Dash | 1–0 | Racing Louisville | Houston, Texas |
| 6:30 PM CT/7:30 PM ET | Daly 49'; Naughton (yellow card) 73'; Visalli (yellow card) 90+7'; Hanson (yellow card) 90+8' | Report | Baucom (yellow card) 68'; Simon (yellow card) 82' | Stadium: BBVA Stadium; Attendance: 5,300; Referee: Katja Koroleva |

| 4 September 17 | Racing Louisville | 1–1 | OL Reign | Louisville, Kentucky |
| 7:30 PM ET | Nadim 23' | Report | Balcer 74', (yellow card) 80' | Stadium: Lynn Family Stadium; Attendance: 6,337; Referee: Tori Penso; Assistant referees: Alicia Messer, Maggie Short; Fourth official: Jarin Harrell |

| 11 September 18 | Orlando Pride | 3–1 | Racing Louisville | Orlando, Florida |
| 7:00 PM ET | Leroux 30'; Marta 34'; Morgan 65' | Report | Kizer 51' | Stadium: Exploria Stadium; Attendance: 3,822; Referee: Elton Garcia |

| 26 September 19 | Racing Louisville | 0–4 | Houston Dash | Louisville, Kentucky |
| 3:00 PM ET | Matthews (yellow card) 16' | Report | Visalli 34'; Mewis 43'; Naughton 72'; Prince 83' | Stadium: Lynn Family Stadium; Attendance: 6,113; Referee: Matt Thompson |

| 6 October 20 | North Carolina Courage | 3–1 | Racing Louisville | Cary, North Carolina |
| 7:30 PM ET | L Williams 14'; Rodriguez 19'; Debinha 30' | Report | McCaskill 24' | Stadium: WakeMed Soccer Park; Referee: Alyssa Nichols |

| 9 October 21 | Washington Spirit | 3–0 | Racing Louisville | Washington, D.C. |
| 7:30 PM ET | Hatch 8', 80'; Sullivan 52' | Report | McCaskill (yellow card) 38' | Stadium: Audi Field; Referee: Laura Rodriguez |

| 16 October 22 | Racing Louisville | 3–1 | Orlando Pride | Louisville, Kentucky |
| 7:30 PM ET | Salmon 45+1'; McClure 52'; Nagasato 77' | Report | Taylor 9', (yellow card) 16' | Stadium: Lynn Family Stadium; Attendance: 8,488; Referee: Matthew Franz |

| 28 October 23 | Racing Louisville | 1–1 | NJ/NY Gotham FC | Louisville, Kentucky |
| 7:30 PM ET | Ashley (yellow card) 16'; Kizer 52' | Report | Onumonu 7'; Lloyd (yellow card) 90' | Stadium: Lynn Family Stadium; Attendance: 6,508; Referee: Samantha Martinez |
Note: Match originally scheduled for October 1; postponed per league-wide suspension of play for Oct. 1–3.

| 31 October 24 | NJ/NY Gotham FC | 1–1 | Racing Louisville | Harrison, New Jersey |
| 3:00 PM ET | Purce (yellow card) 45+1'; Lloyd 53'; Freeman (yellow card) 72' | Report | Salmon (yellow card) 54'; Kizer 69' (pen.); Nagasato (yellow card) 81' | Stadium: Red Bull Arena; Referee: Karen Abt |

=== The Women's Cup ===
Racing Louisville hosted and participated in the inaugural The Women's Cup, a four-team competition featuring two sides from the NWSL and two sides from Europe. Racing Louisville and Chicago Red Stars from NWSL were joined by Paris Saint-Germain Féminine and FC Bayern Munich. In the semifinals on August 18, 2021, Racing Louisville drew with Chicago Red Stars and advanced to the Championship match on penalty kicks, where they would face Bayern Munich, who had also advanced past Paris Saint-Germain via penalty shootout. In the Championship match, Racing Louisville fell behind early in the second half before quickly equalizing on a goal by Jorian Baucom, then took the lead on a goal by Yūki Nagasato, only to yield another to Bayern Munich in stoppage time, sending the match to penalties. Racing Louisville prevailed in an 11-round shootout, after backup goalkeeper Katie Lund converted her spot kick and saved the attempt by her counterpart, Laura Benkarth.

| 21 August Championship match | Racing Louisville (United States) | 2–2 (7–6 p) | (Germany) FC Bayern Munich | Louisville, Kentucky |
| 6:00 PM ET | Baucom 54'; McCaskill (yellow card) 74'; Nagasato 85' | Report | Bühl 49'; Bonner 90+5' (o.g.) | Stadium: Lynn Family Stadium; Attendance: 7,813 |
| | Penalties |
| | Nagasato (penalty missed); Salmon (penalty scored); McCaskill (penalty scored); Miramontez (penalty missed); Baucom (penalty missed); Olofsson (penalty scored); Bonner (penalty missed); Milliet (penalty scored); Riehl (penalty scored); Martin (penalty scored); Lund (penalty scored) | | (penalty scored) Lohmann; (penalty missed) Gwinn; (penalty scored) Asseyi; (penalty missed) Dallmann; (penalty missed) Damnjanović; (penalty scored) Kumagai; (penalty missed) Zadrazil; (penalty scored) Bühl; (penalty scored) Rall; (penalty scored) Wenninger; (penalty missed) Benkarth |

=== NWSL Playoffs ===
Racing Louisville did not qualify for the NWSL Playoffs. Playoffs will start on November 6 and will conclude with the NWSL Championship on November 20, to be held at Lynn Family Stadium in Louisville.

== Player statistics ==
=== Top scorers ===
| Place | Pos. | No. | Name | CC | IWC | NWSL | Total |
|---|---|---|---|---|---|---|---|
| 1 | FW | 5 | (United States) Cece Kizer | 2 | 0 | 6 | 8 |
| 2 | FW | 9 | (England) Ebony Salmon | 0 | 0 | 6 | 6 |
| 3 | FW | 10 | (Denmark) Nadia Nadim | 0 | 0 | 3 | 3 |
| 3 | FW | 17 | (Japan) Yūki Nagasato | 0 | 1 | 2 | 3 |
| 5 | FW | 33 | (United States) Jorian Baucom | 1 | 1 | 0 | 2 |
| 5 | FW | 7 | (United States) Savannah McCaskill | 0 | 0 | 2 | 2 |
| 7 | DF | 15 | (United States) Brooke Hendrix | 1 | 0 | 0 | 1 |
| 7 | FW | 13 | (United States) Emina Ekic | 0 | 0 | 1 | 1 |
| 7 | FW | 20 | (Jamaica) Cheyna Matthews | 0 | 0 | 1 | 1 |
| 7 | FW | 22 | (United States) Katie McClure | 0 | 0 | 1 | 1 |
| Total | | | | 4 | 2 | 21 | 27 |

=== Assist leaders ===
| Place | Pos. | No. | Name | CC | IWC | NWSL | Total |
|---|---|---|---|---|---|---|---|
| 1 | FW | 5 | (United States) Cece Kizer | 1 | 0 | 3 | 4 |
| 2 | FW | 9 | (England) Ebony Salmon | 0 | 0 | 3 | 3 |
| 3 | FW | 7 | (United States) Savannah McCaskill | 0 | 0 | 2 | 2 |
| 3 | MF | 2 | (United States) Lauren Milliet | 0 | 1 | 1 | 2 |
| 3 | FW | 17 | (Japan) Yūki Nagasato | 0 | 0 | 2 | 2 |
| 6 | DF | 11 | (United States) Emily Fox | 1 | 0 | 0 | 1 |
| 6 | MF | 8 | (Sweden) Freja Olofsson | 1 | 0 | 0 | 1 |
| 6 | DF | 3 | (United States) Erin Simon | 1 | 0 | 0 | 1 |
| 6 | FW | 13 | (United States) Emina Ekic | 0 | 0 | 1 | 1 |
| 6 | FW | 10 | (Denmark) Nadia Nadim | 0 | 0 | 1 | 1 |
| 6 | FW | 22 | (United States) Katie McClure | 0 | 0 | 1 | 1 |
| Total | | | | 4 | 1 | 14 | 19 |

=== Clean sheets ===
| Place | Pos. | No. | Name | CC | NWSL | Total |
|---|---|---|---|---|---|---|
| 1 | GK | 1 | (United States) Michelle Betos | 1 | 4 | 5 |
| Total | | | | 1 | 4 | 5 |

=== Disciplinary ===
| Pos. | No. | Name | CC | IWC | NWSL | | Total | |
| Pos. | No. | Name | Booked | Booked | Booked | (yellow card) (yellow-red card) | Booked | (yellow card) (yellow-red card) |
|---|---|---|---|---|---|---|---|---|
| FW | 7 | (United States) Savannah McCaskill | 0 | 1 | 5 | 0 | 6 | 0 |
| FW | 17 | (Japan) Yūki Nagasato | 0 | 0 | 4 | 0 | 4 | 0 |
| DF | 18 | (United States) Kaleigh Riehl | 0 | 0 | 3 | 0 | 3 | 0 |
| MF | 33 | (United States) Jorian Baucom | 1 | 0 | 2 | 0 | 3 | 0 |
| FW | 20 | (Jamaica) Cheyna Matthews | 0 | 0 | 3 | 0 | 3 | 0 |
| DF | 14 | (United States) Nealy Martin | 0 | 0 | 2 | 0 | 2 | 0 |
| DF | 11 | (United States) Emily Fox | 1 | 0 | 1 | 0 | 2 | 0 |
| DF | 4 | (England) Gemma Bonner | 0 | 0 | 2 | 0 | 2 | 0 |
| DF | 18 | (United States) Kaleigh Riehl | 0 | 0 | 2 | 0 | 2 | 0 |
| FW | 10 | (Denmark) Nadia Nadim | 0 | 0 | 2 | 0 | 2 | 0 |
| FW | 9 | (England) Ebony Salmon | 0 | 0 | 2 | 0 | 2 | 0 |
| DF | 12 | (United States) Sinclaire Miramontez | 0 | 0 | 1 | 1 | 1 | 1 |
| MF | 8 | (Sweden) Freja Olofsson | 1 | 0 | 0 | 0 | 1 | 0 |
| FW | 22 | (United States) Katie McClure | 0 | 0 | 1 | 0 | 1 | 0 |
| HC | - | (Northern Ireland) Christy Holly | 0 | 0 | 1 | 0 | 1 | 0 |
| FW | 13 | (United States) Emina Ekic | 0 | 0 | 1 | 0 | 1 | 0 |
| DF | 3 | (United States) Erin Simon | 0 | 0 | 1 | 0 | 1 | 0 |
| DF | 16 | (United States) Julia Ashley | 0 | 0 | 1 | 0 | 1 | 0 |
| Total | | | 3 | 1 | 31 | 1 | 35 | 1 |
