= Yūki Nagasato =

Japanese footballer (born 1987)

Yūki Nagasato 永里 優季
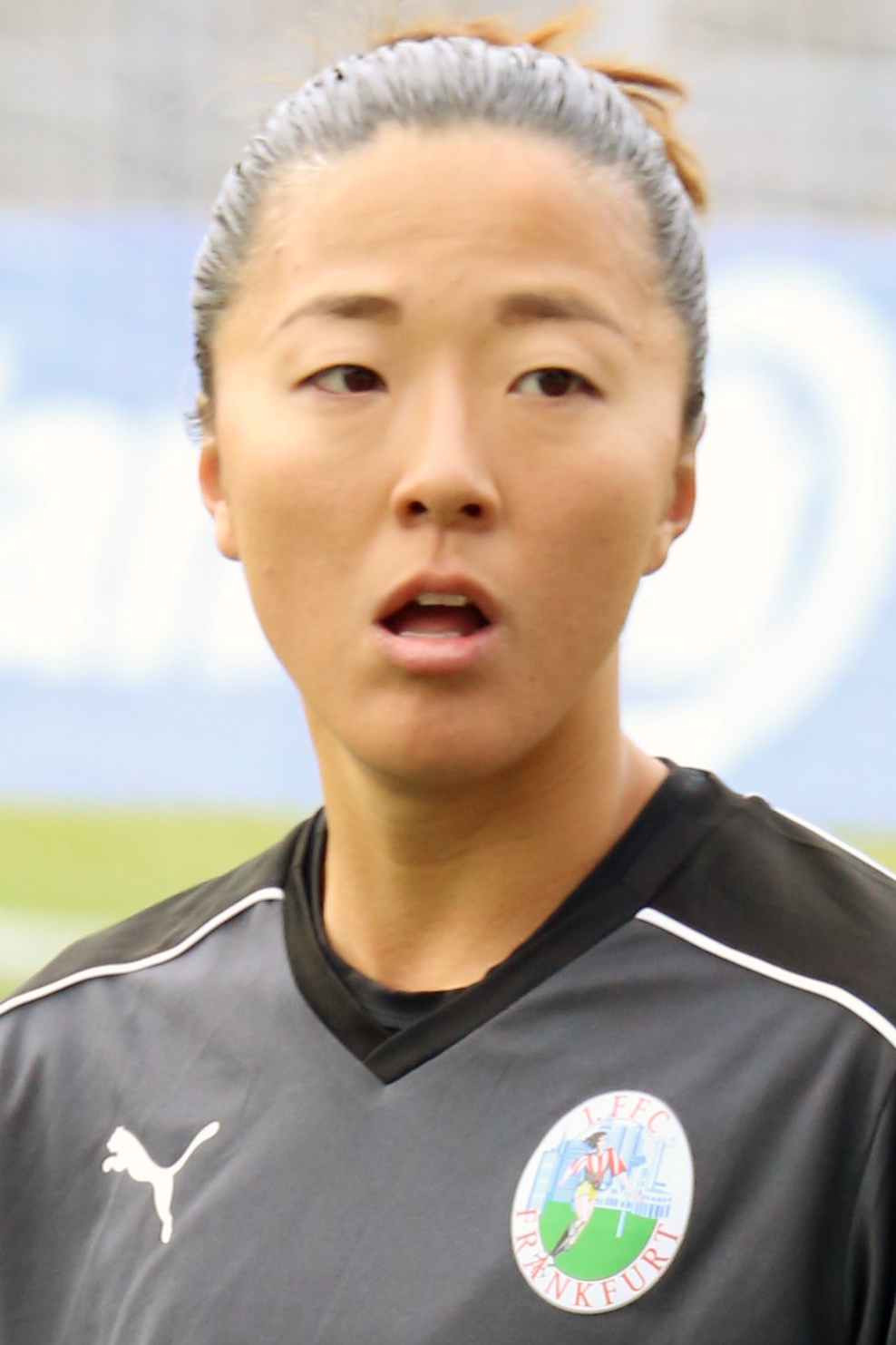
- Nagasato with Frankfurt in 2016

Personal information
- Date of birth: 15 July 1987 (age 39)
- Place of birth: Atsugi, Kanagawa, Japan
- Height: 1.68 m (5 ft 6 in)
- Position: Striker

Senior career*
Years	Team	Apps	(Gls)
2001–2009	Nippon TV Beleza	110	(69)
2010–2013	Turbine Potsdam	71	(48)
2013–2014	Chelsea	18	(5)
2015	Wolfsburg	9	(4)
2015–2017	Frankfurt	35	(8)
2017–2020	Chicago Red Stars	56	(13)
2018–2019	→ Brisbane Roar (loan)	11	(4)
2020	→ Hayabusa Eleven (loan)	4	(0)
2021	Racing Louisville	21	(2)
2022–2023	Chicago Red Stars	27	(5)
2024	Houston Dash	19	(3)
Total		381	(161)

International career
2004–2016	Japan	132	(58)
Medal record
Nippon TV Beleza
Winner	Nadeshiko League	2001
Winner	Nadeshiko League	2002
Winner	Nadeshiko League	2005
Winner	Nadeshiko League	2006
Winner	Nadeshiko League	2007
Winner	Nadeshiko League	2008
Runner-up	Nadeshiko League	2003
Runner-up	Nadeshiko League	2004
Runner-up	Nadeshiko League	2009
Winner	Nadeshiko League Cup	2007
Winner	Empress's Cup	2004
Winner	Empress's Cup	2005
Winner	Empress's Cup	2007
Winner	Empress's Cup	2008
Winner	Empress's Cup	2009
Runner-up	Empress's Cup	2002
Runner-up	Empress's Cup	2003
Representing Japan
Olympic Games
Silver medal – second place	2012 London	Team
FIFA Women's World Cup
Gold medal – first place	2011 Germany
Silver medal – second place	2015 Canada
AFC Women's Asian Cup
Gold medal – first place	2014 Vietnam
Bronze medal – third place	2008 Vietnam
Bronze medal – third place	2010 China
Asian Games
Silver medal – second place	2006 Doha	Team
- * Club domestic league appearances and goals

Yūki Nagasato (永里 優季, Nagasato Yūki; born 15 July 1987), known from 2012 to 2016 as Yūki Ōgimi (大儀見 優季, Ōgimi Yūki), is a Japanese former footballer who played as a striker. Nagasato is the first female footballer to play for the first-team of a Japanese men's club.

Nagasato represented Japan internationally between 2004 and 2016, scoring 58 goals in 132 appearances. She has won the FIFA Women's World Cup in 2011, and was part of the runners-up team in 2015.

== Club career ==
Nagasato was born in Atsugi on 15 July 1987. In 2001, she was promoted to Nippon TV Beleza from her youth team. In the 2002 season, she debuted in L.League. She became one of the division's top scorers in 2006 season. She also won the league championship 6 times (2001, 2002, 2005, 2006, 2007 and 2008).

In 2010, Nagasato moved to Turbine Potsdam in Germany, where she won the Bundesliga's leading goal-scorer award. She also won the UEFA Champions League with that team. In 2013, she transferred to the English FA WSL club Chelsea.

She joined Wolfsburg in early 2015 to play in a stronger league for the 2015 World Cup. In August 2015, Nagasato joined UEFA Champions League 2015 winners Frankfurt.

On 24 May 2017 it was announced that she had signed with the Chicago Red Stars of the National Women's Soccer League (NWSL), she appeared in only 6 games in 2017 due to injury. In 2018 she was named Player of the Week for week 10

In October 2018, Nagasato signed with Brisbane Roar on loan for the 2018–19 W-League season.

On 10 September 2020, Nagasato made history by becoming the first woman to play for Hayabusa Eleven, a men's team in the Kanagawa Prefecture League; she joined on loan until prior to the beginning of the 2021 NWSL season.

On 26 October 2020, newly-formed club Racing Louisville FC announced Nagasato as one of their first signings for the 2021 National Women's Soccer League season.

On 11 January 2022, the Red Stars announced that Nagasato would be returning to Chicago.

On 12 January 2024, Nagasato signed with Houston Dash.

On 4 March 2025, Nagasato retired from professional football.

== International career ==
In April 2004, Nagasato was selected Japan national team for 2004 Summer Olympics qualification. At this competition, on 22 April, she debuted against Thailand. She was also part of Japan's 2008 Summer Olympic team and 2007 World Cup. Nagasato was part of the Japan squad that won the 2011 World Cup. She played as a substitute in the final against the United States. The game went to penalties and Nagasato had her penalty saved by Hope Solo, but Japan still emerged victorious.

Since 2016, she wore the number 10 shirt for Japan, after Homare Sawa retired at 2016 AFC Women's Olympic Qualifying Tournament. After the tournament, new Japan's manager Asako Takakura gave the number 10 to Mizuho Sakaguchi and Nagasato wore the number 9.

== Personal life ==
Nagasato's brother Genki is a professional footballer, and her younger sister Asano also played for Turbine Potsdam.

Nagasato married in July 2011 and changed her registered name from Nagasato to Ōgimi before the 2012 Summer Olympics. Upon her divorce in 2016, she re-assumed her maiden name.

== Career statistics ==
=== Club ===
Club	Season	League		Cup		League Cup		Continental		Total	
Club	Season	Apps	Goals	Apps	Goals	Apps	Goals	Apps	Goals	Apps	Goals
Nippon TV Beleza	2001	0	0			-		-			
Nippon TV Beleza	2002	2	0			-		-		2	0
Nippon TV Beleza	2003	0	0	2	0	-		-		2	0
Nippon TV Beleza	2004	13	3			-		-		13	3
Nippon TV Beleza	2005	21	18	5	6	-		-		26	24
Nippon TV Beleza	2006	16	18	3	2	-		-		19	20
Nippon TV Beleza	2007	18	14	4	1	2	3	-		24	18
Nippon TV Beleza	2008	20	9	3	2	-		-		23	11
Nippon TV Beleza	2009	20	7	4	5	-		-		24	12
Nippon TV Beleza	Total	110	69	21	16	2	3	-		133	88
1. FFC Turbine Potsdam	2009–10	10	6	1	0	-		5	2	16	8
1. FFC Turbine Potsdam	2010–11	21	10	5	6	1	3	8	9	35	28
1. FFC Turbine Potsdam	2011–12	19	13	2	2			6	7	27	22
1. FFC Turbine Potsdam	2012–13	22	18	5	2			4	2	31	22
1. FFC Turbine Potsdam	Total	72	47	13	10	1	3	23	20	109	80
Chelsea	2013	5	0	0	0	0	0	-		5	0
Chelsea	2014	13	5	3	1	4	1	-		20	7
Chelsea	Total	18	5	3	1	4	1	-		25	7
Wolfsburg	2014–15	9	5	2	1	-		4	0	15	6
1. FFC Frankfurt	2015–16	16	5	2	3	-		5	1	23	9
1. FFC Frankfurt	2015–16	19	3	3	1	-		0	0	22	4
1. FFC Frankfurt	Total	35	8	5	4	-		5	1	45	13
Chicago Red Stars	2017	6	1	-		-		-		6	1
Chicago Red Stars	2018	23	4	-		-		-		23	4
Chicago Red Stars	Total	29	5	-		-		-		29	5
Brisbane Roar	2018-19	11	4	-		-		-		11	4
Chicago Red Stars	2019	24	8	-		-		-		24	8
Chicago Red Stars	2020	0	0	2	0	0	0	0	0	2	0
Chicago Red Stars	2022	22	4	6	0	0	0	0	0	28	4
Chicago Red Stars	2023	19	3	4	1	0	0	0	0	23	4
Racing Louisville	2021	21	2	4	0	1	1	0	0	26	3
Houston Dash	2024	19	3	-		0	0	0	0	19	3
Career total		389	163	60	34	8	8	32	21	489	226

=== International ===
Appearances and goals by national team and year
National team	Year	Apps	Goals
Japan	2004	1	0
Japan	2005	9	6
Japan	2006	13	9
Japan	2007	12	4
Japan	2008	17	9
Japan	2009	3	0
Japan	2010	3	1
Japan	2011	17	3
Japan	2012	16	9
Japan	2013	12	6
Japan	2014	9	5
Japan	2015	13	3
Japan	2016	7	3
	Total	132	58

List of international goals scored by Yūki Nagasato
No.	Date	Venue	Opponent	Score	Result	Competition
1.	21 May 2005	Tokyo, Japan	New Zealand	?–0	6–0	Friendly
2.	21 May 2005	Tokyo, Japan	New Zealand	?–0	6–0	Friendly
3.	26 May 2005	Russia	Russia	?–?	4–2	Friendly
4.	28 May 2005	Russia	Russia	?–0	2–0	Friendly
5.	23 July 2005	Tokyo, Japan	Australia	1–2	4–2	Friendly
6.	23 July 2005	Tokyo, Japan	Australia	3–2	4–2	Friendly
7.	19 July 2006	Adelaide, Australia	Vietnam	5–0	5–0	2006 AFC Women's Asian Cup
8.	21 July 2006	Adelaide, Australia	Chinese Taipei	2–0	11–1	2006 AFC Women's Asian Cup
9.	21 July 2006	Adelaide, Australia	Chinese Taipei	3–0	11–1	2006 AFC Women's Asian Cup
10.	21 July 2006	Adelaide, Australia	Chinese Taipei	5–1	11–1	2006 AFC Women's Asian Cup
11.	21 July 2006	Adelaide, Australia	Chinese Taipei	8–1	11–1	2006 AFC Women's Asian Cup
12.	21 July 2006	Adelaide, Australia	Chinese Taipei	11–1	11–1	2006 AFC Women's Asian Cup
13.	30 July 2006	Adelaide, Australia	North Korea	2–3	2–3	2006 AFC Women's Asian Cup
15.	10 December 2006	Doha, Qatar	South Korea	3–0	3–1	2006 Asian Games
16.	28 July 2007	San Jose, United States	United States	1–4	1–4	Friendly
17.	4 August 2007	Hải Phòng, Vietnam	Vietnam	8–0	8–0	2008 Summer Olympics qualification
18.	12 August 2007	Tokyo, Japan	Thailand	2–0	5–0	2008 Summer Olympics qualification
19.	14 September 2007	Shanghai, China	Argentina	1–0	1–0	2007 FIFA Women's World Cup
20.	24 February 2008	Chongqing, China	China	3–0	3–0	2008 EAFF Women's Football Championship
21.	5 March 2008	Larnaca, Cyprus	Netherlands	1–0	3–1	2008 Cyprus Women's Cup
22.	29 May 2008	Hồ Chí Minh City, Vietnam	South Korea	1–0	1–3	2008 AFC Women's Asian Cup
23.	31 May 2008	Hồ Chí Minh City, Vietnam	Chinese Taipei	11–0	11–0	2008 AFC Women's Asian Cup
24.	2 June 2008	Hồ Chí Minh City, Vietnam	Australia	2–0	3–1	2008 AFC Women's Asian Cup
25.	8 June 2008	Hồ Chí Minh City, Vietnam	Australia	1–0	3–0	2008 AFC Women's Asian Cup
26.	24 July 2008	Kobe, Japan	Australia	2–0	3–0	Friendly
27.	29 July 2008	Tokyo, Japan	Argentina	2–0	2–0	Friendly
28.	15 August 2008	Qinhuangdao, China	China	2–0	2–0	2008 Summer Olympics
29.	24 May 2010	Chengdu, China	North Korea	2–0	2–1	2010 AFC Women's Asian Cup
30.	4 March 2011	Lagos, Portugal	Finland	3–0	5–0	2011 Algarve Cup
31.	7 March 2011	Parchal, Portugal	Norway	1–0	1–0	2011 Algarve Cup
32.	27 June 2011	Bochum, Germany	New Zealand	1–0	2–1	2011 FIFA Women's World Cup
31.	29 February 2012	Faro, Portugal	Norway	1–1	2–1	2012 Algarve Cup
32.	7 March 2012	Faro, Portugal	Germany	3–3	3–4	2012 Algarve Cup
33.	5 April 2012	Kobe, Japan	Brazil	2–1	4–1	2012 Women's Kirin Challenge Cup
34.	18 June 2012	Halmstad, Sweden	United States	1–2	1–4	2012 Sweden Invitational
35.	20 June 2012	Gothenburg, Sweden	Sweden	1–0	1–0	2012 Sweden Invitational
36.	3 August 2012	Cardiff, Wales	Brazil	1–0	2–0	2012 Summer Olympics
37.	6 August 2012	London, England	France	1–0	2–1	2012 Summer Olympics
38.	9 August 2012	London, England	United States	1–2	1–2	2012 Summer Olympics
42.	11 March 2013	Parchal, Portugal	Denmark	2–0	2–0	2013 Algarve Cup
43.	13 March 2013	Faro, Portugal	China	1–0	1–0	2013 Algarve Cup
44.	20 June 2013	Saga, Japan	New Zealand	1–?	1–1	Friendly
45.	29 June 2013	Munich, Germany	Germany	?–?	4–2	Friendly
46.	27 July 2013	Seoul, South Korea	South Korea	1–2	1–2	2013 EAFF Women's East Asian Cup
47.	22 September 2013	Nagasaki, Japan	Nigeria	1–0	2–0	Friendly
48.	10 March 2014	Faro, Portugal	Sweden	2–1	2–1	2014 Algarve Cup
49.	14 May 2014	Hồ Chí Minh City, Vietnam	Australia	2–2	2–2	2014 AFC Women's Asian Cup
50.	16 May 2014	Hồ Chí Minh City, Vietnam	Vietnam	3–0	4–0	2014 AFC Women's Asian Cup
51.	25 October 2014	Edmonton, Canada	Canada	1–0	3–0	Friendly
52.	28 October 2014	Vancouver, Canada	Canada	2–1	3–2	Friendly
53.	28 May 2015	Nagano, Japan	Italy	1–0	1–0	Friendly
54.	16 June 2015	Winnipeg, Canada	Ecuador	1–0	1–0	2015 FIFA Women's World Cup
55.	5 July 2015	Vancouver, Canada	United States	1–4	2–5	2015 FIFA Women's World Cup
56.	29 February 2016	Osaka, Japan	Australia	1–2	1–3	2016 AFC Women's Olympic Qualifying Tournament
57.	7 March 2016	Osaka, Japan	Vietnam	6–1	6–1	2016 AFC Women's Olympic Qualifying Tournament
58.	2 June 2016	Commerce City, United States	United States	2–0	3–3	Friendly

== Honours ==
Nippon TV Beleza

- L.League: 2002, 2005, 2008
- Empress's Cup: 2005, 2006, 2008, 2010
- Nadeshiko League Cup: 2007

1. FFC Turbine Potsdam

- Bundesliga: 2010, 2011
- UEFA Champions League: 2010

VfL Wolfsburg

- DFB Pokal: 2014–15

Japan

- FIFA Women's World Cup: 2011; runner-up: 2015
- East Asian Football Championship: 2008
- Summer Olympic Games runner-up: 2012
- AFC Women's Asian Cup: 2014

Individual

- L.League top-goalscorer: 2006
- L-League Best Eleven: 2005, 2006
- Bundesliga top-goalscorer: 2013

== See also ==
- List of women's footballers with 100 or more international caps
