= 2020 NWSL expansion draft =

Soccer draft

General information
- Sport: Soccer
- Date: November 12, 2020
- Time: 7 p.m. EST
- Location: Lynn Family Stadium; Louisville, Kentucky
- Network: Twitch

Overview
- 18 total selections
- League: National Women's Soccer League
- Teams: 1
- Expansion team: Racing Louisville FC
- Expansion season: 2021

The 2020 NWSL expansion draft was a special draft held on November 12, 2020, by the National Women's Soccer League (NWSL) for Racing Louisville FC, an expansion team, to select players from existing teams in the league. Louisville would be able to select up to 18 players from a list of unprotected players provided by the nine incumbent NWSL teams.

On October 26, 2020, the NWSL announced that Chicago Red Stars would receive full roster protection after executing a trade with Racing Louisville FC.

== Format ==
Each of the NWSL's nine teams could protect 11 players, with a limit of two United States federation players. Racing Louisville FC could select a maximum of two players (or one United States federation player) per team, and two United States federation players in total. All players currently under contract, on loan, or whose NWSL rights are held by an NWSL team (e.g., draft picks, waiver claims, retired players) were eligible for selection unless included on the protected list, and only players not yet signed from an NWSL team's discovery list were exempt.

The timeline for the Expansion Draft process was as follows:

- Thursday, Oct. 22 (1 p.m. ET) – Trade/waiver window closes
- Thursday, Oct. 22 (5 p.m. ET) – All previously unannounced trades announced
- Thursday, Oct. 29 (5 p.m. ET) – End-of-season process deadline
- Wednesday, Nov. 4 (5 p.m. ET) – Protected list due from clubs to the NWSL
- Thursday, Nov. 5 (1 p.m. ET) – Protected/unprotected lists distributed and made public
- Thursday, Nov. 12 – 2020 NWSL Expansion Draft
- Friday, Nov. 13 (9 a.m. ET) – Trade window opens

== Draft results ==
Racing Louisville FC selected 14 players on November 12, 2020.

- Blue highlights indicate United States federation players
- Italics indicate players who are not under contract but whose NWSL playing rights remain with the team

#	Player	Previous team	Pos.
1	Addisyn Merrick	North Carolina Courage	DF
2	Julia Ashley	OL Reign	DF
3	Jennifer Cudjoe	Sky Blue FC	MF
4	CeCe Kizer	Houston Dash	MF
5	Katie Lund	Washington Spirit	GK
6	Alanna Kennedy	Orlando Pride	DF
7	Lauren Milliet	North Carolina Courage	MF
8	Kaleigh Riehl	Sky Blue FC	DF
9	Caitlin Foord	Orlando Pride	FW
10	Katie McClure	Washington Spirit	FW
11	Erin Simon	Houston Dash	DF
12	Michelle Betos	OL Reign	GK
13	Tobin Heath	Portland Thorns FC	FW
14	Christen Press	Utah Royals FC	FW

== Protected lists by team ==
After Chicago Red Stars traded for full roster protection, the remaining eight current NWSL teams released their respective protected lists on November 5, 2020.

- **Bold** indicates players selected in the Expansion Draft
- Blue highlights indicate United States federation players
- Italics indicate players who are not under contract but whose NWSL playing rights remain with the team

=== Houston Dash ===
Protected	Unprotected
Jane Campbell	Bridgette Andrzejewski
Allysha Chapman	Chloe Castaneda
Rachel Daly	Taylor Comeau
Shea Groom	Niki Cross
Haley Hanson	Amanda Dennis
Veronica Latsko	Marissa Diggs
Kristie Mewis	Jamia Fields
Katie Naughton	Lindsey Harris
Megan Oyster	Melissa Henderson
Nichelle Prince	Bianca Henninger
Sophie Schmidt	Savannah Jordan
	Maegan Kelly
	**CeCe Kizer**
	Christine Nairn
	Ally Prisock
	Cami Privett
	**Erin Simon**
	Katie Stengel
	Bri Visalli

=== North Carolina Courage ===
Protected	Unprotected
Abby Dahlkemper	Lindsay Agnew
Debinha	Jaelene Daniels
Abby Erceg	Bri Folds
Kristen Hamilton	Hailey Harbison
Hailie Mace	Kaleigh Kurtz
Merritt Mathias	Steph Labbé
Jessica McDonald	Sam Leshnak
Casey Murphy	McKenzie Meehan
Denise O'Sullivan	**Addisyn Merrick**
Lynn Williams	**Lauren Milliet**
Sam Mewis	Sinclaire Miramontez
	Heather O'Reilly
	Cari Roccaro
	Katelyn Rowland
	Havana Solaun
	Meredith Speck
	Ally Watt
	Ryan Williams

=== Orlando Pride ===
Protected	Unprotected
Claire Emslie	Kristen Edmonds
Taylor Kornieck	Caitlin Farrell
Sydney Leroux	Joanna Fennema
Phoebe McClernon	**Caitlin Foord**
Jade Moore	Ashlyn Harris
Alex Morgan	**Alanna Kennedy**
Courtney Petersen	Abi Kim
Ali Riley	Ali Krieger
Emily Sonnett	Camila
Marta	Erin McLeod
Marisa Viggiano	Carson Pickett
	Konya Plummer
	Toni Pressley
	Cheyenne Shorts
	Emily van Egmond
	Chelsee Washington
	Brittany Wilson
	Shelina Zadorsky

=== Portland Thorns FC ===
Protected	Unprotected
Simone Charley	Nadine Angerer
Crystal Dunn	Bella Bixby
Lindsey Horan	Celeste Boureille
Kelli Hubly	Marian Dougherty
Meghan Klingenberg	Britt Eckerstrom
Natalia Kuikka	Marissa Everett
Emily Menges	Adrianna Franch
Raquel Rodríguez	**Tobin Heath**
Christine Sinclair	Tyler Lussi
Sophia Smith	Andressinha
Morgan Weaver	Nikki Marshall
	Meg Morris
	Meaghan Nally
	Emily Ogle
	Madison Pogarch
	Hayley Raso
	Kat Reynolds
	Angela Salem
	Becky Sauerbrunn
	Gabby Seiler
	Kat Tarr
	Rachel Van Hollebeke
	Christen Westphal
	Sandra Yu

=== OL Reign ===
Protected	Unprotected
Bethany Balcer	Morgan Andrews
Lauren Barnes	**Julia Ashley**
Amber Brooks	**Michelle Betos**
Jess Fishlock	Meg Brandt
Sofia Huerta	Mariah Bullock
Darian Jenkins	Steph Catley
Rose Lavelle	Steph Cox
Allie Long	Shirley Cruz
Kristen McNabb	Kiersten Dallstream
Yuka Momiki	Schuyler DeBree
Leah Pruitt	Machaela George
	Madison Hammond
	Sam Hiatt
	Kelcie Hedge
	Celia
	Adrienne Jordan
	Alyssa Kleiner
	Theresa Nielsen
	Morgan Proffitt
	Quinn
	Megan Rapinoe
	Taylor Smith
	Jasmyne Spencer
	Jodie Taylor
	Rumi Utsugi
	Abby Wambach
	Dani Weatherholt
	Rosie White
	Lydia Williams
	Bev Yanez

=== Sky Blue FC ===
Protected	Unprotected
Imani Dorsey	Nicole Baxter
Nahomi Kawasumi	Melanie Booth
Amanda McGlynn	**Jennifer Cudjoe**
Paige Monaghan	Julie Doyle
Ifeoma Onumonu	Caprice Dydasco
Mallory Pugh	Elizabeth Eddy
Midge Purce	Sabrina Flores
Kailen Sheridan	Mandy Freeman
Evelyne Viens	Christina Gibbons
Sarah Woldmoe	DiDi Haracic
McCall Zerboni	Megan Hinz
	Jen Hoy
	Estelle Johnson
	Gina Lewandowski
	Carli Lloyd
	Jill Loyden
	Manya Makoski
	Domi Richardson
	**Kaleigh Riehl**
	Erica Skroski
	Chantelle Swaby
	Madison Tiernan
	Becki Tweed
	Kenie Wright

=== Utah Royals FC ===
Protected	Unprotected
Elizabeth Ball	Nicole Barnhart
Katie Bowen	Vero Boquete
Rachel Corsie	Kate Deines
Kate Del Fava	Cyera Hintzen
Tziarra King	Lauren Holiday
Lo'eau LaBonta	Gunnhildur Jónsdóttir
Kelley O'Hara	Samantha Johnson
Amy Rodriguez	Mandy Laddish
Abby Smith	Taylor Leach
Michele Vasconcelos	Taylor Lytle
Gaby Vincent	Michelle Maemone
	Diana Matheson
	Sydney Miramontez
	Maddie Nolf
	**Christen Press**
	Brittany Ratcliffe
	Desiree Scott
	Arielle Ship
	Raisa Strom-Okimoto
	Erika Tymrak
	Mallory Weber

=== Washington Spirit ===
Protected	Unprotected
Dorian Bailey	Jaye Boissiere
Aubrey Bledsoe	Averie Collins
Jordan DiBiasi	Meggie Dougherty Howard
Bayley Feist	Jenna Hellstrom
Ashley Hatch	Brooke Hendrix
Tori Huster	Natalie Jacobs
Tegan McGrady	Devon Kerr
Paige Nielsen	Lori Lindsey
Ashley Sanchez	Joanna Lohman
Sam Staab	**Katie Lund**
Andi Sullivan	**Katie McClure**
	Meghan McCool
	Jessie Scarpa
	Crystal Thomas
	Kumi Yokoyama

== See also ==
- List of NWSL drafts
- 2021 National Women's Soccer League season
