= List of NWSL hat-tricks =

List of National Women's Soccer League statistics

Since the inception of the National Women's Soccer League (NWSL) in 2013, there have been 36 occasions when a player scored three or more goals (a hat-trick) in a single league match, with an additional 6 hat-tricks in other competitions. These have been scored by 27 players in league games and 6 players in non-league games, with 3 players scoring hat-tricks in both. To date, all hat-tricks have resulted in wins or draws for the hat-trick scorer's team, and no hat-tricks have been scored in the playoffs.

== Hat-tricks ==
=== League matches ===
As of matches played September 26, 2026.

Key
*	The home team
	Away game for the hat-trick scorer
^{§}	Game was a draw
^{+}	More than 3 goals

Notes: The results column shows the home team's score first. Numbers after players' names signify multiple hat-tricks in the league.

Nation	Player	G	Time of goals	For	Against	Result	Date	Ref.
(United States) USA	Sydney Leroux	3	26', 74', 84'	Boston Breakers*	Chicago Red Stars	4–1	May 4, 2013	
(United States) USA	Carli Lloyd	3	3', 22', 56'	Western New York Flash*	Washington Spirit	4–0	June 28, 2013	
(United States) USA	Jazmine Reeves	3	25', 45', 59'	Boston Breakers*	Portland Thorns FC	4–1	May 28, 2014	
(Canada) CAN	Christine Sinclair	3	35', 42', 46'	Portland Thorns FC*	Boston Breakers	6–3	July 20, 2014	
(Denmark) DEN	Nadia Nadim	3	39', 74', 90+2'	Sky Blue FC	Houston Dash*	1–3	August 9, 2014	
(United States) USA	Megan Rapinoe	3	71', 74', 86'	Seattle Reign FC*	Western New York Flash	5–1	April 12, 2015	
(United States) USA	Crystal Dunn	3	28', 36', 45+1'	Washington Spirit*	Houston Dash	3–1	August 1, 2015	
(Scotland) SCO	Kim Little	3	42', 74', 90'	Seattle Reign FC	Houston Dash*	0–3	August 21, 2015	
(United States) USA	Jessica McDonald	3	28', 43', 49'	Western New York Flash*	Boston Breakers	7–1	June 24, 2016	
(Denmark) DEN	Nadia Nadim (2)	3	41', 79', 90+2'	Portland Thorns FC*	Boston Breakers	5–1	September 4, 2016	
(Australia) AUS	Sam Kerr	3	78', 81', 90'	Sky Blue FC*	FC Kansas City	3–2	July 8, 2017	
(United States) USA	Megan Rapinoe (2)	3	27', 47', 87'	Seattle Reign FC*	Sky Blue FC	5–4	July 22, 2017	
(Australia) AUS	Sam Kerr (2)	4^{+}	48', 68', 71', 90+4'	Sky Blue FC*	Seattle Reign FC	5–4	August 19, 2017	
(Australia) AUS	Sam Kerr (3)	3	40', 46', 63'	Chicago Red Stars	Sky Blue FC*	1–3	July 7, 2018	
(United States) USA	Lynn Biyendolo	3	56', 72', 89'	North Carolina Courage	Sky Blue FC*	0–4	July 14, 2018	
(Canada) CAN	Christine Sinclair (2)	3	16', 51', 87'	Portland Thorns FC	Chicago Red Stars*	4–4^{§}	April 20, 2019	
(United States) USA	Kristen Hamilton	3	59', 66', 85'	North Carolina Courage	Orlando Pride*	0–3	June 1, 2019	
(Australia) AUS	Sam Kerr (4)	3	7', 45+2', 55'	Chicago Red Stars	Orlando Pride*	2–3	June 30, 2019	
(United States) USA	Kristen Hamilton (2)	4^{+}	5', 18', 54', 71'	North Carolina Courage*	Houston Dash	5–2	July 5, 2019	
(United States) USA	Lynn Biyendolo (2)	3	21', 24', 68'	North Carolina Courage	Portland Thorns FC*	0–6	September 11, 2019	
(United States) USA	Alex Morgan	4^{+}	45+1', 66', 70', 90+1'	San Diego Wave FC*	NJ/NY Gotham FC	4–0	May 7, 2022	
(Canada) CAN	Nichelle Prince	3	27', 39', 49'	Houston Dash*	Orlando Pride	5–0	June 3, 2022	
(England) ENG	Ebony Salmon	3	11', 45+1', 55'	Houston Dash*	Chicago Red Stars	4–1	July 16, 2022	
(Brazil) BRA	Debinha	3	27', 34', 81'	North Carolina Courage*	NJ/NY Gotham FC	3–0	September 24, 2022	
(United States) USA	Sophia Wilson	3	18', 83', 88'	Portland Thorns FC	Kansas City Current*	1–4	April 1, 2023	
(Brazil) BRA	Kerolin	3	11', 34', 60'	North Carolina Courage	Chicago Red Stars*	0–5	June 10, 2023	
(United States) USA	Sophia Wilson (2)	3	11', 23', 48'	Portland Thorns FC*	Washington Spirit	4–2	June 23, 2023	
(Canada) CAN	Cloé Lacasse	3	3', 20', 45+6'	Utah Royals*	Seattle Reign FC	3–0	October 13, 2024	
(Zambia) ZAM	Barbra Banda	3	7', 37', 38'	Orlando Pride	Utah Royals*	3–1	May 23, 2025	
(Brazil) BRA	Ludmila	3	76', 81', 86'	Chicago Stars FC*	North Carolina Courage	3–3^{§}	August 22, 2025	
(Nigeria) NGR	Gift Monday	3	18', 21', 36'	Washington Spirit*	Houston Dash	4–0	September 28, 2025	
(Japan) JPN	Manaka Matsukubo	3	3', 8', 80'	North Carolina Courage*	Bay FC	4–1	October 17, 2025	
(Malawi) MAW	Temwa Chawinga	3	22', 47', 49'	Kansas City Current*	Chicago Stars FC	3–0	May 10, 2026	
(Sweden) SWE	Evelyn Ijeh	3	26', 35', 70'	North Carolina Courage*	Orlando Pride	5–0	July 31, 2026	
(United States) USA	Pietra Tordin	3	2', 10', 37'	Portland Thorns FC	Boston Legacy FC*	3–4	August 9, 2026	
(United States) USA	Ashley Sanchez	3	11', 69', 81'	North Carolina Courage	Chicago Stars FC*	0–6	September 6, 2026	
(United States) USA	Haley Hopkins	3	39', 47', 57'	Kansas City Current*	Denver Summit FC	4–1	September 26, 2026	

=== Other competitions ===
As of September 17, 2025

Competition	Nation	Player	G	Time of goals	For	Against	Result	Date	Ref.
2020 NWSL Fall Series	(Canada) CAN	Christine Sinclair	3	40', 45+5', 74'	Portland Thorns FC*	OL Reign	4–1	October 1, 2020	
2023 NWSL Challenge Cup	(United States) USA	Kristen Hamilton	3	45+1', 45+4', 68'	Kansas City Current*	Houston Dash	3–1	July 22, 2023	
2024–25 CONCACAF W Champions Cup	(United States) USA	Yazmeen Ryan	3	13', 18', 90+2'	NJ/NY Gotham FC	Frazsiers Whip Women FC*	0–13	October 3, 2024	
2024–25 CONCACAF W Champions Cup	(United States) USA	Lynn Biyendolo	3	82', 86', 90+3'	NJ/NY Gotham FC	Frazsiers Whip Women FC*	0–13	October 3, 2024	
2025–26 CONCACAF W Champions Cup	(Ivory Coast) CIV	Rosemonde Kouassi	3	21', 52', 59'	Washington Spirit	Alianza Women F.C.*	0–7	August 19, 2025	
2025–26 CONCACAF W Champions Cup	(United States) USA	Summer Yates	3	6', 22', 58'	Orlando Pride	Chorrillo Women FC*	0–5	September 16, 2025	

== Multiple hat-tricks ==
As of September 26, 2026

Seven players have scored more than one hat-trick in NWSL competitions.

Boldface indicates a player currently on an NWSL team.

Nation	Player	NWSL	Other	Total
(Australia) AUS	**Sam Kerr**	4	0	4
(United States) USA	**Lynn Biyendolo**	2	1	3
(United States) USA	Kristen Hamilton	2	1	3
(Canada) CAN	Christine Sinclair	2	1	3
(Denmark) DEN	Nadia Nadim	2	0	2
(United States) USA	Megan Rapinoe	2	0	2
(United States) USA	**Sophia Wilson**	2	0	2

== Hat-trick records and statistics ==
- First NWSL player to score a hat-trick: Sydney Leroux, with the Boston Breakers against the Chicago Red Stars on May 4, 2013
  - First hat-trick scored in a non-regular season competition: Christine Sinclair, with Portland Thorns FC against OL Reign on October 1, 2020, in the 2020 NWSL Fall Series
  - First hat-trick scored in an NWSL Challenge Cup match: Kristen Hamilton, with Kansas City Current against Houston Dash on July 22, 2023, in the 2023 NWSL Challenge Cup
- Youngest player to score a hat-trick: Manaka Matsukubo (21 years, 81 days), with the North Carolina Courage against Bay FC on October 17, 2025.
- Fastest hat-trick, in time between first and third goals: 10 minutes, 9 seconds (Ludmila, 75:18–85:27 for Chicago Stars FC against North Carolina Courage on August 22, 2025)
- Slowest hat-trick, in time between first and last goals: 76 minutes, 51 seconds (Manaka Matsukubo, 2:25–79:16 for North Carolina Courage against Bay FC on October 17, 2025)
- Earliest hat-trick, in time from kickoff to third goal: 35 minutes 52 seconds (Gift Monday with Washington Spirit against Houston Dash on September 28, 2025).
- Latest hat-trick, in time from kickoff to first goal: 78 minutes (Sam Kerr, completed at 90' with Sky Blue FC against FC Kansas City on July 8, 2017).
- Players to score more than one hat-trick in a season:
  - Sam Kerr (two, 2017)
  - Kristen Hamilton (two, 2019)
  - Sophia Wilson (two, 2023)
- Players who scored hat-tricks for more than one NWSL team:
  - Sam Kerr (Sky Blue, Chicago)
  - Nadia Nadim (Sky Blue, Portland)
  - Kristen Hamilton (North Carolina, Kansas City Current)
- Players who scored four goals in one match of an NWSL competition:
  - Sam Kerr, with Sky Blue FC against Seattle Reign FC on August 19, 2017
  - Kristen Hamilton, with North Carolina Courage against Houston Dash on July 5, 2019
  - Alex Morgan, with San Diego Wave FC against NJ/NY Gotham FC on May 7, 2022
- Most hat-tricks scored by an NWSL team, all competitions: 9
  - North Carolina Courage
- Most hat-tricks conceded by an NWSL team, all competitions: 6
  - Houston Dash, Chicago Stars FC
- NWSL teams yet to score a hat-trick:
  - Racing Louisville FC (joined in 2021)
  - Angel City FC (joined in 2022)
  - Bay FC (joined in 2024)
  - Boston Legacy FC (joined in 2026)
  - Denver Summit FC (joined in 2026)
- NWSL teams yet to concede a hat-trick:
  - Racing Louisville FC (joined in 2021)
  - Angel City FC (joined in 2022)
  - San Diego Wave FC (joined in 2022)
- Most hat-tricks in an NWSL regular season: 5 (2019, 2026)
- Fewest hat-tricks in an NWSL regular season: 0 (2021)

== See also ==
- NWSL records and statistics
