= Cece Delzer =

American soccer player (born 1997)

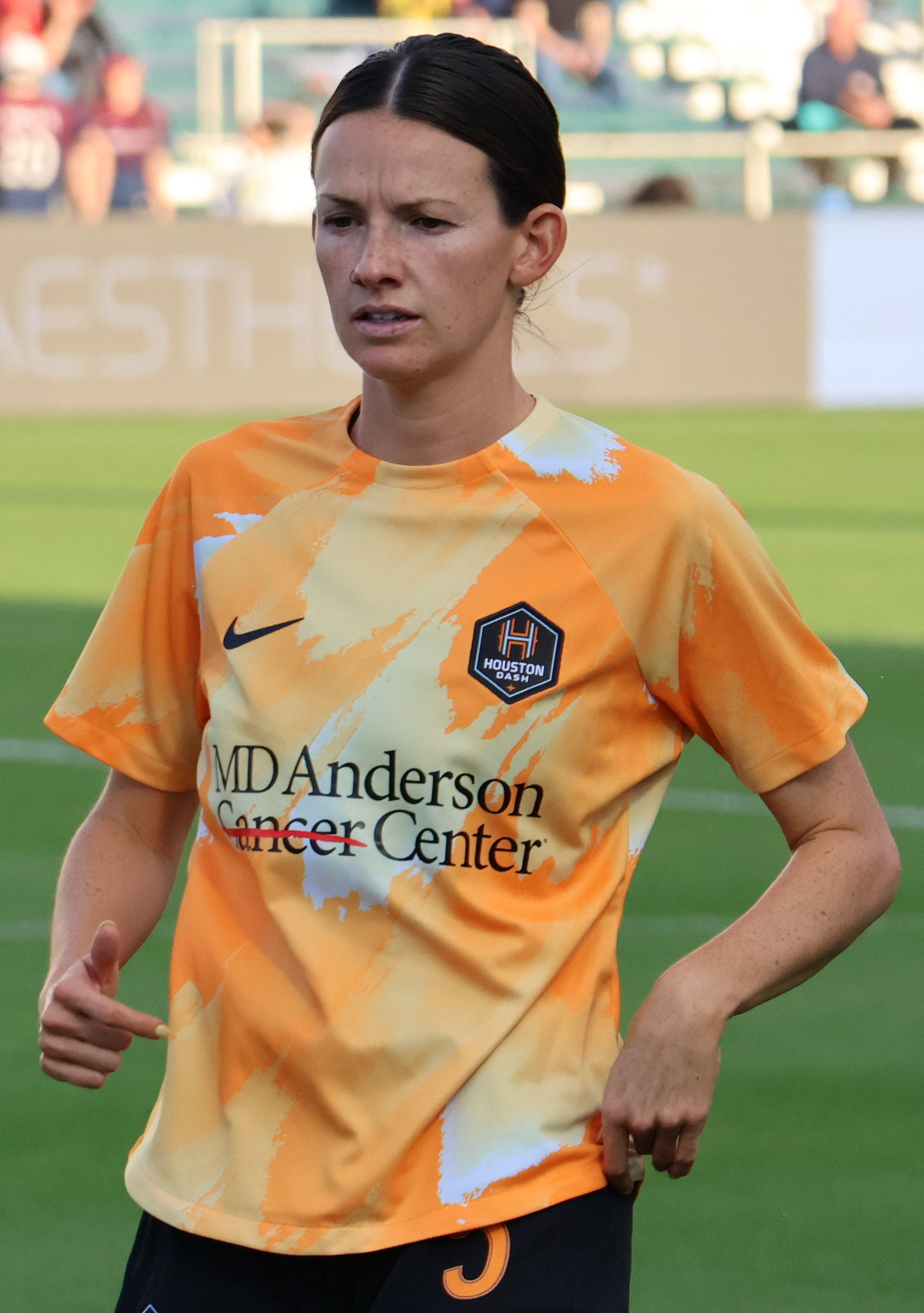
- Delzer with the Houston Dash in 2024

Personal information
- Birth name: Cecelia Anne Kizer
- Date of birth: August 7, 1997 (age 29)
- Place of birth: Overland Park, Kansas
- Height: 5 ft 8 in (1.73 m)
- Positions: Forward; midfielder

Team information
- Current team: Utah Royals
- Number: 5

College career
Years	Team	Apps	(Gls)
2015–2018	Ole Miss Rebels	83	(48)

Senior career*
Years	Team	Apps	(Gls)
2019–2020	Houston Dash	16	(0)
2020	Kolbotn	5	(3)
2021–2022	Racing Louisville	29	(5)
2022–2023	Kansas City Current	35	(13)
2024	Houston Dash	3	(0)
2024–2025	Gotham FC	8	(1)
2025–	Utah Royals	38	(6)

International career
2018–2019	United States U-23		
- * Club domestic league appearances and goals as of 04:20, November 10, 2026 (UTC)

Cecelia Anne Delzer (née Kizer; born August 7, 1997) is an American professional soccer player who plays as a forward or a midfielder for the Utah Royals of the National Women's Soccer League (NWSL).

== College career ==
Delzer played college soccer at Ole Miss from 2015 to 2018. She scored 48 goals for Ole Miss, the most in program history, and was named first-team All-SEC three times.

== Club career ==
Delzer was drafted by Houston Dash in the 2nd round of the 2019 NWSL College Draft.

She was selected by Racing Louisville in the 2020 NWSL Expansion Draft.

Delzer scored the first goal for Racing Louisville in the 12th minute on a through ball from the team's No. 1 draft pick Emily Fox in the opening game of the Challenge Cup against the NWSL Orlando Pride on Saturday, April 10, 2021, to give the team a 1–0 lead. The inaugural game for Racing Louisville was held Lynn Family Stadium in Louisville. Racing Louisville tied the game in stoppage time on a goal by Brooke Hendrix.

Delzer scored seven goals and added three assists across all competitions in 2021. She again scored the first goal of the season for Racing Louisville in the 2022 NWSL Challenge Cup.

Delzer was traded along with Addisyn Merrick to the Kansas City Current on June 9, 2022.

On January 17, 2024, Delzer returned to the Houston Dash in a trade for Nichelle Prince.

On September 7, 2024, NJ/NY Gotham FC signed Delzer to multi-year contract.

On April 17, 2025, Gotham announced they and Delzer agreed to a mutual contract termination. The next day, Delzer signed a two-year deal with the Utah Royals and subsequently made her club debut in a 1–0 win over the Chicago Stars.

== International career ==
She was called up to the United States national under-23 team in August 2019.

== Personal life ==
Formerly known as Cece Kizer, she began using her married name, Cece Delzer, professionally in 2026 after her December 2025 marriage to Alyssa Delsanter. The last name "Delzer" was created by combining "Delsanter" and "Kizer."

== Honors ==
Houston Dash

- NWSL Challenge Cup: 2020
