= 2021 National Women's Soccer League season =

Ninth season of the National Women's Soccer League

National Women's Soccer League
- Season: 2021
- Champions: Washington Spirit (1st title)
- NWSL Shield: Portland Thorns FC (2nd shield)
- Challenge Cup: Portland Thorns FC (1st cup)
- Matches: 120
- Goals: 278 (2.32 per match)
- Top goalscorer: Ashley Hatch (10 goals)
- Biggest home win: POR 5–0 CHI (May 16); NC 5–0 LOU (May 28)
- Biggest away win: LOU 0–4 HOU (Sept 26)
- Highest scoring: RGN 5–1 HOU (Aug 7)
- Longest winning run: 4 games NC (June 19 - July 4); POR (July 7 - Aug 26); WAS (Oct 9 – Oct 31)
- Longest unbeaten run: 8 games NJY (June 5 – Aug 7); POR (July 3 – Aug 26); RGN (Aug 14 - Oct 13); NJY (Sept 4 – Oct 31)
- Longest winless run: 13 games KC (May 15–Aug 15)
- Longest losing run: 6 games KC (May 26–July 27)
- Highest attendance: 27,278; RGN vs. POR (August 29, 2021) (NWSL Record)
- Lowest attendance: 1,929; HOU vs. POR (July 24, 2021)
- Total attendance: 592,074
- Average attendance: 5,104
- All statistics correct as of June 23, 2024. Attendance at 2 matches were not reported.

The 2021 National Women's Soccer League season was the ninth season of the National Women's Soccer League, the top division of women's soccer in the United States. Including the NWSL's two professional predecessors, Women's Professional Soccer (2009–2011) and the Women's United Soccer Association (2001–2003), it is the 15th overall season of FIFA and USSF-sanctioned top division women's soccer in the United States.

This season was the first in which the NWSL has been fully self-governing. After the 2020 season, the league terminated its management contract with the United States Soccer Federation (USSF or U.S. Soccer), which nonetheless continues to provide major financial support to the NWSL. Further financial backing is provided by the Canadian Soccer Association. Both national federations pay the league salaries of many of their respective national team members in an effort to nurture talent in those nations and take a major financial burden off of individual clubs.

On November 18, 2020, the NWSL announced new competition formats for the 2021 season. The Challenge Cup became a league cup competition played before the start of the regular season. The Cup was followed by the 24-match regular season, which began on May 15 and concluded on October 31. The playoffs were expanded to include the six teams, with the top two seeds receiving a first-round bye. Playoffs started on November 6 and concluded with the NWSL Championship on November 20.

In the 2021 NWSL Challenge Cup, Portland Thorns FC and NJ/NY Gotham FC won the West and East Divisions, respectively, earning the right to play in the final. As Portland had the better record, they hosted the final, which was played on May 8 in Providence Park in Portland, Oregon. The game was a 1–1 draw after 90 minutes; Portland won the ensuing penalty shootout 6–5 to win the cup.

In the regular season, the Portland Thorns won the most points and thus earned the NWSL Shield.

In the playoffs, the Washington Spirit and Chicago Red Stars progressed to the final, which was played on Nov. 20, 2021 in Louisville, Kentucky. The Spirit prevailed 2–1 in overtime, winning the NWSL Championship.

The season was also marked by a sexual misconduct controversy that erupted on September 30, when The Athletic published an investigation into North Carolina Courage head coach Paul Riley that accused him of a pattern of sexual coercion and abuse, and also alleged numerous inappropriate comments about players' physical appearance and sexuality. More than a dozen players from every team Riley had coached since 2010 spoke to the publication, and two named players went on the record with allegations against him. The Courage fired Riley that day, and U.S. Soccer immediately suspended his coaching license. The next day, the NWSL called off all of its scheduled matches for that weekend, both FIFA and U.S. Soccer announced they were starting their own investigations into Riley, league commissioner Lisa Baird resigned, and league general counsel Lisa Levine was dismissed. Further reporting revealed systemic failure by NWSL leadership to investigate allegations against Riley, including some made in the 2021 season.

== Teams, stadiums, and personnel ==
=== Team names ===
Before the start of the season, Sky Blue FC rebranded as NJ/NY Gotham FC with new team insignia, jerseys, and colors.

The new Kansas City team, which played the 2021 season under the placeholder name of Kansas City NWSL, announced its permanent identity of Kansas City Current at its final home game on October 30.

=== Stadiums and locations ===
Capacities listed here are full capacities, and do not reflect COVID-19 restrictions.

Team	Stadium	Capacity
Chicago Red Stars	SeatGeek Stadium	20,000
Houston Dash	PNC Stadium (Note: This venue was known as BBVA Stadium at the start of the season. It was renamed PNC Stadium after PNC Financial Services completed its purchase of BBVA USA on June 1.)	7,000 (Note: The full capacity is 22,039, but the maximum capacity for Dash games is restricted to 7,000.)
Kansas City	Legends Field	10,385
NJ/NY Gotham FC	Red Bull Arena	25,000
NJ/NY Gotham FC	MSU Soccer Park (Note: Gotham FC played their Challenge Cup home games at the MSU Soccer Park.)	5,000
North Carolina Courage	Sahlen's Stadium at WakeMed Soccer Park	10,000
OL Reign	Cheney Stadium	6,500
Orlando Pride	Exploria Stadium	25,500
Portland Thorns FC	Providence Park	25,218
Racing Louisville FC	Lynn Family Stadium	11,700 (Note: Seated capacity; full capacity with standing room is 15,304.)
Washington Spirit (Note: The Spirit were scheduled to play seven regular-season games at Audi Field and five at Segra Field. Their scheduled home opener on May 26 at Segra Field became a road game at Houston due to construction delays, and the home date was not made up.)	Audi Field	20,000
Washington Spirit	Segra Field	5,000

Locations of the National Women's Soccer League teams in 2021.

=== Personnel and sponsorship ===
Note: All teams use Nike as their kit manufacturer.

Team	Head coach	Captain	Shirt sponsor
Chicago Red Stars	(United States) Rory Dames	(United States) Julie Ertz	
Houston Dash	(England) James Clarkson	(United States) Jane Campbell (England) Rachel Daly	MD Anderson Cancer Center
Kansas City	(Wales) Huw Williams	(Scotland) Rachel Corsie	Palmer Square Capital Management
NJ/NY Gotham FC	(England) Scott Parkinson	(United States) McCall Zerboni	Avaya
North Carolina Courage	(United States) Sean Nahas (interim)	(New Zealand) Abby Erceg	Continental AG
OL Reign	(England) Laura Harvey	(United States) Lauren Barnes (United States) Megan Rapinoe	Black Future Co-op Fund
Orlando Pride	(United States) Becky Burleigh (interim)	(United States) Ashlyn Harris	Orlando Health
Portland Thorns FC	(England) Mark Parsons	(Canada) Christine Sinclair	Providence Health & Services
Racing Louisville FC	(United States) Mario Sanchez (interim)	(United States) Michelle Betos	GE Appliances
Washington Spirit		(United States) Tori Huster (United States) Andi Sullivan	IntelliBridge

=== Coaching changes ===
Team	Outgoing coach	Manner of departure	Date of vacancy	Position in table	Incoming coach	Date of appointment	Ref.
Racing Louisville FC				Preseason	(Northern Ireland) Christy Holly	August 12, 2020	
Kansas City				Preseason	(Wales) Huw Williams	December 7, 2020	
OL Reign	(France) Farid Benstiti	Resigned	July 2, 2021	9th	(England) Sam Laity (interim)	July 2, 2021	
Orlando Pride	(England) Marc Skinner	Resigned	July 23, 2021	5th	(United States) Becky Burleigh (interim)	July 25, 2021	
OL Reign	(England) Sam Laity (interim)	End of interim period	August 9, 2021 (Note: Although Harvey was appointed on July 15, 2021, she officially took up the position on August 9, 2021.)	6th	(England) Laura Harvey	July 15, 2021	
Washington Spirit	(England) Richie Burke	Reassigned (Note: The Spirit initially re-assigned Burke to the front office but suspended him one day later pending an investigation by the league. He was terminated for cause on September 28, 2021, after the league concluded its investigation.)	August 10, 2021	7th			
NJ/NY Gotham FC	(England) Freya Coombe	Mutual separation	August 30, 2021	7th	(England) Scott Parkinson	August 31, 2021	
Racing Louisville FC	(Northern Ireland) Christy Holly	Terminated for cause	August 31, 2021	9th	(United States) Mario Sanchez (interim)	August 31, 2021	
North Carolina Courage	(England) Paul Riley	Terminated	September 30, 2021	3rd	(United States) Sean Nahas (interim)	September 30, 2021	

== Regular season ==
Pos	Team	Pld	W	D	L	GF	GA	GD	Pts	Qualification
1	Portland Thorns FC	24	13	5	6	33	17	+16	44	NWSL Shield
2	OL Reign	24	13	3	8	37	24	+13	42	Playoffs – Semi-finals
3	Washington Spirit (C)	24	11	6	7	29	26	+3	39	Playoffs – First round
4	Chicago Red Stars	24	11	5	8	28	28	0	38	Playoffs – First round
5	NJ/NY Gotham FC	24	8	11	5	29	21	+8	35	Playoffs – First round
6	North Carolina Courage	24	9	6	9	28	23	+5	33	Playoffs – First round
7	Houston Dash	24	9	5	10	31	31	0	32	
8	Orlando Pride	24	7	7	10	27	32	−5	28	
9	Racing Louisville FC	24	5	7	12	21	40	−19	22	
10	Kansas City	24	3	7	14	15	36	−21	16	

Source: NWSL
Rules for classification: Tiebreakers
(C) Champions

=== Tiebreakers ===
The initial determining factor for a team's position in the standings (and hence playoff qualification and seeding) is points earned, with three points earned for a win, one point for a draw, and zero points for a loss. If two or more teams are tied in points, the NWSL uses the following tiebreaker criteria in the order listed:

1. Head-to-head win–loss record, or points per game if more than two teams, between the teams tied in points.
2. Greatest goal difference (against all teams, not just tied teams).
3. Greatest total number of goals scored (against all teams, not just tied teams).
4. Apply #1–3 to games played on the road.
5. Apply #1–3 to games played at home.
6. Coin toss or drawing of lots.

Note: If two clubs remain tied after another club with the same number of points advances during any step, tiebreaker determination restarts at step 1.

== Attendance ==
NWSL attendance in 2021 was impacted by the ongoing COVID-19 pandemic. Some early-season matches were closed to the public because of COVID restrictions, and when games were opened, many teams had lower average attendances than the most recent regular season in 2019. This table excludes the 2021 NWSL Challenge Cup.

=== Average home attendances ===
Ranked from highest to lowest average attendance.

Team	GP	Attendance	High	Low	Average
Portland Thorns FC	9	112,992	17,584	5,819	12,555
Racing Louisville FC	12	79,042	8,488	5,843	6,587
OL Reign	12	62,885	27,278	2,104	5,240
North Carolina Courage	12	59,837	7,064	3,523	4,986
Kansas City	12	58,043	6,345	3,449	4,837
Orlando Pride	12	50,728	5,755	3,407	4,227
Washington Spirit	10	41,304	6,002	2,233	4,130
NJ/NY Gotham FC	12	45,516	9,532	1,924	3,793
Houston Dash	13	44,017	4,792	1,929	3,386
Chicago Red Stars	12	37,710	4,488	2,265	3,143
Total	116	592,074	27,278	1,924	5,104

Updated through 2021 season. Two matches were not reported, mostly resulting from the absence of fans due to COVID-19 pandemic restrictions. Portland Thorns FC were the only club not to report matches (versus Louisville June 5 and Kansas City June 20). Two matches (September 4 Washington at Portland and September 12 OL Reign at Washington) were declared forfeits by Washington due to COVID protocol violations and not played. Due to construction delays, Washington's scheduled home opener on May 26 at Segra Field became a road game at Houston, and the home date was not made up.

== Statistical leaders ==
As of October 31, 2021.

=== Top scorers ===
Rank	Player	Club	Goals
1	(United States) Ashley Hatch	Washington Spirit	10
2	(United States) Bethany Balcer	OL Reign	9
2	(England) Rachel Daly	Houston Dash	9
2	(United States) Midge Purce	NJ/NY Gotham FC	9
5	(United States) Sydney Leroux	Orlando Pride	8
5	(Nigeria) Ifeoma Onumonu	NJ/NY Gotham FC	8
7	(France) Eugénie Le Sommer	OL Reign	7
7	(United States) Sophia Smith	Portland Thorns FC	7
7	(United States) Lynn Williams	North Carolina Courage	7
10	(United States) Megan Rapinoe	OL Reign	6
10	(United States) Trinity Rodman	Washington Spirit	6
10	(England) Ebony Salmon	Racing Louisville FC	6

=== Top assists ===
Rank	Player	Club	Assists
1	(United States) Sofia Huerta	OL Reign	6
1	(United States) Trinity Rodman	Washington Spirit	6
3	(United States) Caprice Dydasco	NJ/NY Gotham FC	5
3	(United States) Carson Pickett	North Carolina Courage	5
5	(Wales) Jess Fishlock	OL Reign	4
5	(Japan) Nahomi Kawasumi	NJ/NY Gotham FC	4
5	(United States) Kristie Mewis	Houston Dash	4
5	(Nigeria) Ifeoma Onumonu	NJ/NY Gotham FC	4
5	(United States) Courtney Petersen	Orlando Pride	4
5	(United States) Mallory Pugh	Chicago Red Stars	4
5	(United States) Kealia Watt	Chicago Red Stars	4

=== Clean sheets ===
Rank	Player	Club	Clean sheets
1	(United States) Casey Murphy	North Carolina Courage	11
2	(United States) Bella Bixby	Portland Thorns FC	9
3	(United States) Aubrey Bledsoe	Washington Spirit	8
4	(United States) Adrianna Franch	2 teams	7
4	(France) Sarah Bouhaddi	OL Reign	7
6	(Canada) Kailen Sheridan	NJ/NY Gotham FC	6
7	(United States) Cassie Miller	Chicago Red Stars	5
8	(United States) Michelle Betos	Racing Louisville FC	4
8	(United States) Jane Campbell	Houston Dash	4
10	(United States) Ashlyn Harris	Orlando Pride	3
10	(United States) Alyssa Naeher	Chicago Red Stars	3

=== Hat-tricks ===
To date, 2021 was the only NWSL season in which there were no hat-tricks.

== Playoffs ==
Beginning this season, the top six teams from the regular season competed for the NWSL Championship, with the top two teams receiving a first-round bye.

First round
4	Chicago Red Stars	1
5	NJ/NY Gotham FC	0
3	Washington Spirit (a.e.t.)	1
6	North Carolina Courage	0

Semi-finals
1	Portland Thorns FC	0
4	Chicago Red Stars	2
2	OL Reign	1
3	Washington Spirit	2

Championship
4	Chicago Red Stars	1
3	Washington Spirit (a.e.t.)	2

=== First round ===
November 7, 2021
15:00 ET

Chicago Red Stars	1–0	NJ/NY Gotham FC
Woldmoe (yellow card) 51'; Pugh 61'; DiBernardo (yellow card) 80'	Report	Freeman (yellow card) 67'; Lloyd (yellow card) 72'; Johnson (yellow card) 90'

SeatGeek Stadium, Bridgeview, Illinois
Attendance: 7,027
Referee: Kevin Broadley
November 7, 2021
17:30 ET

Washington Spirit	1–0 (a.e.t.)	North Carolina Courage
Hatch 113'	Report

Audi Field, Washington, D.C.
Attendance: 5,379
Referee: Natalie Simon

=== Semi-finals ===
November 14, 2021
15:00 ET

OL Reign	1–2	Washington Spirit
Le Sommer 3'; Rapinoe (yellow card) 88'; Watt (yellow card) 89'	Report	Rodman 12'; O'Hara (yellow card) 61'; Sanchez 68'

Cheney Stadium, Tacoma, Washington
Attendance: 5,273
Referee: Matt Franz
November 14, 2021
17:30 ET

Portland Thorns FC	0–2	Chicago Red Stars
Salem (yellow card) 80'	Report	Johnson 37'; Woldmoe 59'

Providence Park, Portland, Oregon
Attendance: 15,832
Referee: Katja Koroleva

=== Championship ===
November 20, 2021
12:00 ET

Washington Spirit	2–1 (a.e.t.)	Chicago Red Stars
Sullivan 67' (pen.); O'Hara 97'; Roddar (yellow card) 101'	Report	Hill 45+5'

Lynn Family Stadium, Louisville, Kentucky
Attendance: 10,360
Referee: Tori Penso

Championship MVP: Aubrey Bledsoe (WAS)

== Challenge Cup ==
The 2021 NWSL Challenge Cup was a tournament-style competition starting on April 9 and ending with a final played on May 8, before the start of the regular NWSL season. The tournament was organized as a group stage with two five-team, geographically chosen groups playing a round-robin, followed by a single-game final featuring the top team from each group. NJ/NY Gotham FC won the Eastern Division and the Portland Thorns won the Western one. In the final, held at Providence Park in Portland, these two teams tied 1-1 after 90 minutes and went straight to a penalty-kick shootout, with Portland prevailing 6–5 in seven rounds of penalties.

=== East Division ===
Pos	Team	Pld	W	D	L	GF	GA	GD	Pts	Qualification
1	NJ/NY Gotham FC	4	2	2	0	5	3	+2	8	Qualification for the Championship
2	North Carolina Courage	4	2	1	1	9	8	+1	7	
3	Orlando Pride	4	1	2	1	3	3	0	5	
4	Washington Spirit	4	1	1	2	3	4	−1	4	
5	Racing Louisville FC	4	0	2	2	4	6	−2	2	

Source: NWSL
Rules for classification: Tiebreakers

=== West Division ===
Pos	Team	Pld	W	D	L	GF	GA	GD	Pts	Qualification
1	Portland Thorns FC	4	3	1	0	6	2	+4	10	Qualification for the Championship
2	OL Reign	4	2	1	1	5	5	0	7	
3	Houston Dash	4	1	3	0	4	2	+2	6	
4	Chicago Red Stars	4	0	2	2	3	5	−2	2	
5	Kansas City	4	0	1	3	4	8	−4	1	

Source: NWSL
Rules for classification: Tiebreakers

=== Championship ===
May 8, 2021
10:00 PT

Portland Thorns FC	1–1	NJ/NY Gotham FC
Sinclair 8'; Charley (yellow card) 79'	Report	Lewandowski (yellow card) 38'; Lloyd 61'
Penalties
Sinclair (penalty scored); Klingenberg (penalty missed); Horan (penalty scored); Rodríguez (penalty scored); Dunn (penalty scored); Sauerbrunn (penalty scored); Weaver (penalty scored)	6–5	(penalty scored) Long; (penalty scored) Lloyd; (penalty missed) Cudjoe; (penalty scored) Freeman; (penalty scored) Onumonu; (penalty scored) Viens; (penalty missed) Kawasumi

Providence Park, Portland, Oregon
Attendance: 4,588
Referee: Natalie Simon

== Individual awards ==
As of November 20, 2021

=== Annual awards ===
Award	Winner		Nominees	Ref.
Golden Boot	(United States) Ashley Hatch (10 G)	Washington Spirit		
Coach of the Year	(England) Laura Harvey	OL Reign	(England) Mark Parsons, POR (England) Scott Parkinson, NJY	
Rookie of the Year	(United States) Trinity Rodman	Washington Spirit	(United States) Emily Fox, LOU (Canada) Victoria Pickett, KC	
Goalkeeper of the Year	(United States) Aubrey Bledsoe	Washington Spirit	(Canada) Kailen Sheridan, NJY (United States) Bella Bixby, POR	
Defender of the Year	(United States) Caprice Dydasco	NJ/NY Gotham FC	(United States) Sarah Gorden, CHI (United States) Emily Menges, POR (United States) Carson Pickett, NCC (United States) Alana Cook, RGN	
Most Valuable Player	(Wales) Jess Fishlock	OL Reign	(United States) Mallory Pugh, CHI (United States) Midge Purce, NJY (United States) Ashley Hatch, WAS (United States) Angela Salem, POR	

==== Teams of the Year ====
NWSL Teams of the Season
Pos.	Best XI		Second XI		Ref.
GK	(Canada) Kailen Sheridan	NJ/NY Gotham FC	(United States) Bella Bixby	Portland Thorns FC	
DF	(United States) Carson Pickett	North Carolina Courage	(United States) Emily Fox	Racing Louisville FC	
DF	(United States) Sarah Gorden	Chicago Red Stars	(United States) Emily Menges	Portland Thorns FC	
DF	(United States) Alana Cook	OL Reign	(United States) Meghan Klingenberg	Portland Thorns FC	
DF	(United States) Caprice Dydasco	NJ/NY Gotham FC	(United States) Sofia Huerta	OL Reign	
MF/FW	(Wales) Jess Fishlock	OL Reign	(United States) Lindsey Horan	Portland Thorns FC	
MF/FW	(France) Eugénie Le Sommer	OL Reign	(England) Rachel Daly	Houston Dash	
MF/FW	(United States) Angela Salem	Portland Thorns FC	(United States) Mallory Pugh	Chicago Red Stars	
MF/FW	(United States) Midge Purce	NJ/NY Gotham FC	(United States) Sydney Leroux	Orlando Pride	
MF/FW	(United States) Ashley Hatch	Washington Spirit	(United States) Bethany Balcer	OL Reign	
MF/FW	(United States) Trinity Rodman	Washington Spirit	(Nigeria) Ifeoma Onumonu	NJ/NY Gotham FC	

NWSL Championship Game MVP
Player	Club
(United States) Aubrey Bledsoe	Washington Spirit

=== Monthly Awards ===
==== Player of the Month ====
Month	Player	Club	Ref.
May	(United States) Alex Morgan	Orlando Pride	
June	(United States) Lynn Williams	North Carolina Courage	
July	(United States) Ashley Hatch	Washington Spirit	
August	(United States) Megan Rapinoe	OL Reign	
September	(United States) Bethany Balcer	OL Reign	
October	(United States) Midge Purce	NJ/NY Gotham FC	

==== Team of the Month ====
Month	Goalkeeper	Defenders	Midfielders	Forwards	Ref.
May	(Canada) Kailen Sheridan, NJY	(United States) Caprice Dydasco, NJY (United States) Emily Fox, LOU (United States) Phoebe McClernon, ORL (United States) Carson Pickett, NC	(Brazil) Debinha, NC (United States) Crystal Dunn, POR (Wales) Jessica Fishlock, RGN	(United States) Sydney Leroux, ORL (United States) Alex Morgan, ORL (United States) Mallory Pugh, CHI	
June	(United States) Michelle Betos, LOU	(United States) Caprice Dydasco, NJY (2) (New Zealand) Abby Erceg, NC (United States) Courtney Petersen, ORL (United States) Becky Sauerbrunn, POR	(United States) Tori Huster, WAS (United States) Kristie Mewis, HOU (United States) Sam Mewis, NC	(Brazil) Marta, ORL (United States) Trinity Rodman, WAS (United States) Lynn Williams, NC	
July	(United States) Bella Bixby, POR	(United States) Caprice Dydasco, NJY (3) (United States) Emily Menges, POR (United States) Meghan Klingenberg, POR (United States) Katie Naughton, HOU	(United States) Andi Sullivan, WAS (United States) Allie Long, NJY (United States) Morgan Gautrat, CHI	(United States) Sydney Leroux, ORL (2) (United States) Mallory Pugh, CHI (2) (United States) Ashley Hatch, WAS	
August	(United States) Casey Murphy, NC	(United States) Caprice Dydasco, NJY (4) (United States) Emily Menges, POR (2) (United States) Ali Krieger, ORL (United States) Carson Pickett, NC (2)	(Wales) Jessica Fishlock, RGN (2) (Republic of Ireland) Denise O'Sullivan, NC (United States) Angela Salem, POR	(Denmark) Nadia Nadim, LOU (Nigeria) Ifeoma Onumonu, NJY (United States) Megan Rapinoe, RGN	
September	(Canada) Kailen Sheridan, NJY (2)	(United States) Tierna Davidson, CHI (United States) Sofia Huerta, RGN (Cameroon) Estelle Johnson, NJY (United States) Casey Krueger, CHI	(United States) Morgan Gautrat, CHI (2) (Germany) Dzenifer Marozsan, RGN (United States) Angela Salem, POR (2)	(United States) Bethany Balcer, RGN (England) Rachel Daly, HOU (France) Eugenie Le Sommer, RGN	
October	(United States) Aubrey Bledsoe, WAS	(United States) Caprice Dydasco, NJY (5) (United States) Sofia Huerta, RGN (2) (United States) Sarah Gorden, CHI (United States) Sam Staab, WAS	(Wales) Jessica Fishlock, RGN (3) (United States) Morgan Gautrat, CHI (3) (United States) Angela Salem, POR (3)	(United States) Ashley Hatch, WAS (2) (United States) Midge Purce, NJY (United States) Trinity Rodman, WAS (2)	

=== Weekly awards ===
Week	Player of the Week		Save of the Week		Ref.
Week	Player	Club	Player	Club	Ref.
1	(United States) Midge Purce	NJ/NY Gotham FC	(United States) Ashlyn Harris	Orlando Pride	
2	(United States) Emina Ekic	Racing Louisville FC	(Canada) Erin McLeod	Orlando Pride	
3	(United States) Mallory Pugh	Chicago Red Stars	(Canada) Kailen Sheridan	NJ/NY Gotham FC	
4	(United States) Lindsey Horan	Portland Thorns FC	(United States) Ashlyn Harris (2)	Orlando Pride	
5	(United States) Michelle Betos	Racing Louisville FC	(United States) Abby Smith	Kansas City	
6	(United States) Lynn Williams	North Carolina Courage	(United States) Michelle Betos	Racing Louisville FC	
7	(Jamaica) Havana Solaun	North Carolina Courage	(United States) Ashlyn Harris (3)	Orlando Pride	
8	(United States) Ashley Hatch	Washington Spirit	(Bosnia and Herzegovina) Didi Haracic	NJ/NY Gotham FC	
9	(United States) Mallory Pugh (2)	Chicago Red Stars	(United States) Ashlyn Harris (4)	Orlando Pride	
10	(United States) Tziarra King	OL Reign	(United States) Ashlyn Harris (5)	Orlando Pride	
11	(France) Eugenie Le Sommer	OL Reign	(United States) Bella Bixby	Portland Thorns FC	
12	(United States) Bethany Balcer	OL Reign	(United States) Christen Westphal	Portland Thorns FC	
13	(Nigeria) Ifeoma Onumonu	NJ/NY Gotham FC	(United States) Ashlyn Harris (6)	Orlando Pride	
14	(United States) Megan Rapinoe	OL Reign	(France) Sarah Bouhaddi	OL Reign	
15	(United States) Sarah Woldmoe	Chicago Red Stars	(United States) Ashlyn Harris (7)	Orlando Pride	
16	(United States) Bethany Balcer (2)	OL Reign	(United States) Ashlyn Harris (8)	Orlando Pride	
17	(United States) Sydney Leroux	Orlando Pride	(United States) Bella Bixby (2)	Portland Thorns FC	
18	(France) Eugenie Le Sommer (2)	OL Reign	(United States) Ashlyn Harris (9)	Orlando Pride	
19	Games postponed				
20	(England) Rachel Daly	Houston Dash	(United States) Ashlyn Harris (10)	Orlando Pride	
21	(United States) Midge Purce (2)	NJ/NY Gotham FC	(Wales) Jess Fishlock	OL Reign	
22	(France) Eugenie Le Sommer (3)	OL Reign	(Canada) Kailen Sheridan (2)	NJ/NY Gotham FC	
