= Shelby Money =

American soccer player (born 1997)

Personal information
- Full name: Shelby Danielle Money
- Date of birth: April 22, 1997 (age 29)
- Height: 5 ft 7 in (1.70 m)
- Position: Goalkeeper

Team information
- Current team: Rowan Profs (assistant coach)

Youth career
- New Jersey Rush

College career
| Years | Team | Apps | (Gls) |
| 2015–2018 | Rowan Profs | 67 | (0) |

Senior career*
| Years | Team | Apps | (Gls) |
| 2019 | Washington Spirit Reserves | | |
| 2021 | Racing Louisville FC | 0 | (0) |
| 2024 | Þór/KA | 12 | (0) |

Managerial career
- 2020: Saint Joseph's Hawks (assistant)
- 2022–: Rowan Profs (assistant)
- * Club domestic league appearances and goals as of April 6, 2025

Shelby Danielle Money (born April 22, 1997) is an American soccer coach and former player who is currently an assistant coach for the Rowan Profs. She played college soccer for the Profs before playing one professional season each with Racing Louisville FC of the National Women’s Soccer League (NWSL) and Þór/KA of the Besta deild kvenna. She has also previously been an assistant coach for the Saint Joseph's Hawks.

== Early life ==
Money grew up in Vineland, New Jersey. She started playing as a goalkeeper at the age of 11 and spent her youth playing club soccer with the New Jersey Rush. Money attended Vineland High School and played varsity soccer for four years. Although she was a backup goalie in her freshman year, Money eventually assumed Vineland's starting spot in later seasons and was a team captain in her last two years of high school. She graduated from Vineland High tied for having the fifth-best academic record in her class.

== College career ==
Money was a four-year starter for the Rowan Profs. In her freshman year, she played and started 12 games. One of Money's starts occurred in Rowan's NCAA tournament third-round loss against Messiah College, in which she made 9 saves. Money continued to get playing time, and she increased her tally to 19 starts the following season. She recorded an 11-game shutout streak at the start of her sophomore year and only allowed 8 goals across the entire campaign. Money was subsequently named to the All-Conference first team.

2017 was another successful year for Money, who was named to the All-Conference second team and conceded only 7 goals, one less than the year previous. In her final year of college, Money started every game for the Profs and captained the squad. She was named to the All-American third team, All-Conference first team, and the South Atlantic Region first team Money completed her college career as a chart-topper, setting program records for shutouts, goals against, and career wins. She was also a three-time conference Defensive Player of the Week and a two-time NJAC Goalkeeper of the Year.

== Club career ==
Ahead of the 2019 NWSL College Draft, Money was among the list of players registered for selection. However, she was ultimately not picked by any club.

Instead, Money spent 2019 playing with the Washington Spirit's reserve team. She helped the squad win a CCL Pro23 championship, making 3 saves in the final and recording 7 clean sheets across the season.

The following year, Money joined the OL Reign in 2020 preseason as a non-rostered invitee. She did not make the Reign's final squad.

In 2021, Money again started the NWSL preseason as a trialist, this time for expansion club Racing Louisville FC. She ended up signing her first professional contract with Racing Louisville in April 2021. In their inaugural season, Louisville finished 9th overall in the league and failed to qualify for the NWSL playoffs. Money did not make any appearances in her lone season with Louisville.

On March 26, 2024, Money signed a contract with Icelandic top-flight club Þór/KA. She starred in 12 Besta deild kvenna league matches in her first season with Þór/KA. Money also made 3 Icelandic Women's Football Cup appearances and made a crucial penalty save in Þór/KA's 1–0 quarterfinal victory over FH.

== Coaching career ==
Money spent five years coaching at The Keeper Institute, working under fellow Vineland native and Money's former coach Jill Loyden. In October 2020, Money joined the Saint Joseph's Hawks as an assistant coach.

Ahead of the 2022 season, Money became an assistant coach for her former college team, the Rowan Profs.

== Career statistics ==
=== Club ===
Appearances and goals by club, season and competition
| Club | Season | League | | | Cup (Note: Includes the NWSL Challenge Cup and Icelandic Women's Football Cup) | | Playoffs (Note: Includes NWSL playoffs) | | Total | |
| Club | Season | Division | Apps | Goals | Apps | Goals | Apps | Goals | Apps | Goals |
|---|---|---|---|---|---|---|---|---|---|---|
| Racing Louisville FC | 2021 | NWSL | 0 | 0 | 0 | 0 | — | | 0 | 0 |
| Þór/KA | 2024 | Besta deild kvenna | 12 | 0 | 3 | 0 | — | | 15 | 0 |
| Career total | | | 12 | 0 | 3 | 0 | 0 | 0 | 15 | 0 |
