= Erin Simon =

American soccer player

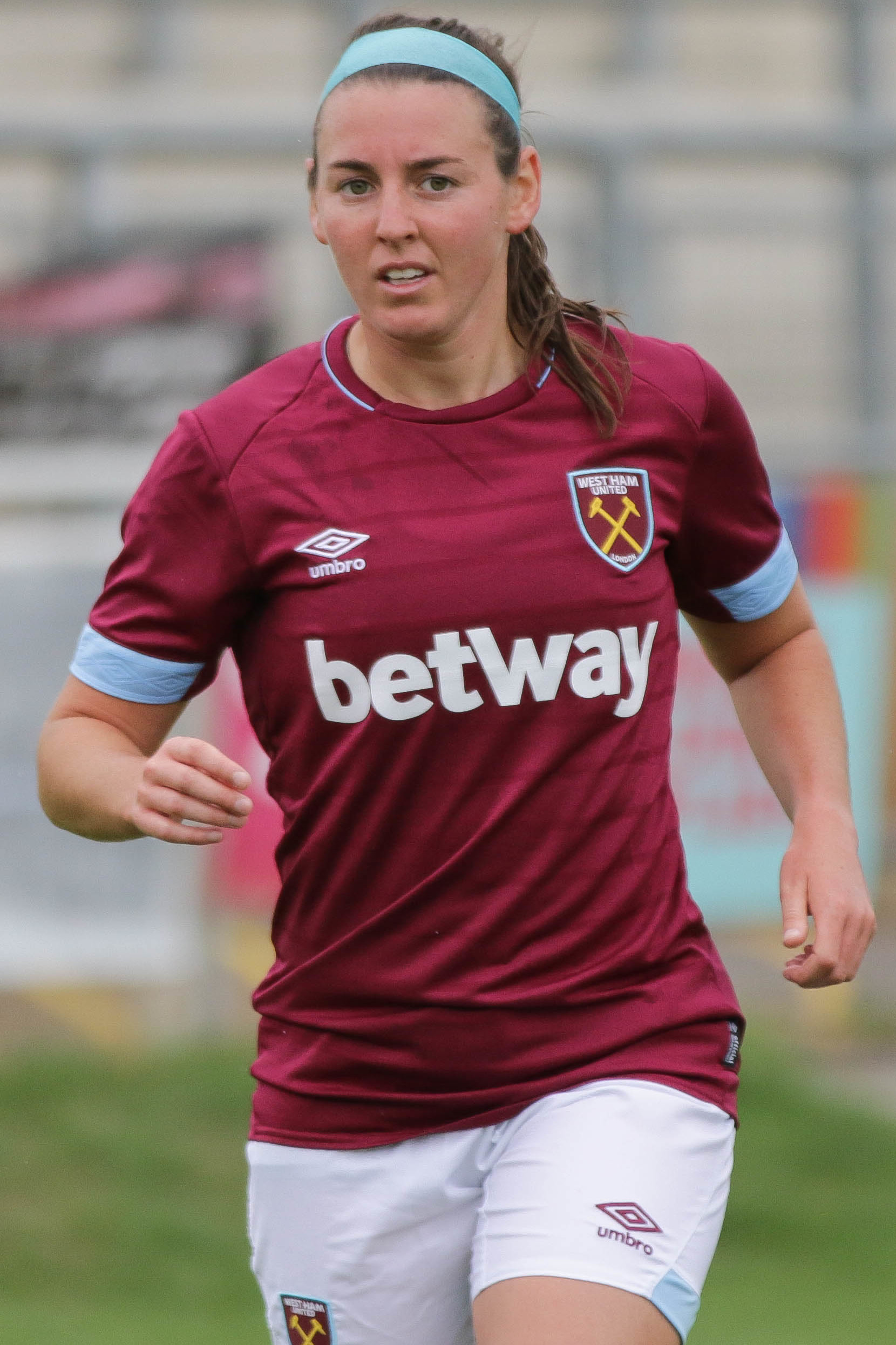
- Erin Simon playing for West Ham United on August 12, 2018

Personal information
- Full name: Erin Dorothy Simon
- Date of birth: August 19, 1994 (age 32)
- Place of birth: Oakhurst, New Jersey
- Height: 5 ft 5 in (1.65 m)
- Position: Defender

College career
Years	Team	Apps	(Gls)
2012–2015	Syracuse Orange	37	(1)

Senior career*
Years	Team	Apps	(Gls)
2016–2018	Sky Blue FC	26	(0)
2018–2020	West Ham United	19	(0)
2020	Houston Dash	0	(0)
2021–2022	Racing Louisville	29	(0)
2022–2023	Leicester City	11	(0)

International career
2019	United States U23	2	(0)
- * Club domestic league appearances and goals as of July 7, 2023

Erin Dorothy Simon (born August 19, 1994) is a retired American women's soccer player who last played as a defender for Women's Super League club Leicester City.

== Collegiate career ==
Simon played college soccer for the Syracuse Orange between 2012 and 2015.

== Club career ==
=== Sky Blue FC ===
After attending an open tryout and impressing in preseason matches, Simon was signed by Sky Blue FC in April 2016. On May 4, 2018, Simon was released by Sky Blue FC.

=== West Ham United ===
On September 14, 2018, Simon joined West Ham United ahead of the London club's debut season in the FA WSL. The campaign saw West Ham reach their first ever FA Cup final. Simon played 89 minutes as Manchester City won 3–0 at Wembley Stadium.

=== Houston Dash ===
On January 24, 2020, Simon left West Ham to return to the NWSL, signing with Houston Dash.

=== Racing Louisville ===
On November 12, 2020, Simon was selected by Racing Louisville FC in the 2020 NWSL Expansion Draft. Simon appeared in 21 matches in the 2021 season, starting 18 at fullback.

After appearing in two matches in the 2022 season, Racing released Simon to pursue playing opportunities outside of the NWSL.

=== Leicester City ===
On July 11, 2022, Simon signed for Women's Super League club Leicester City.

=== Retirement ===
On July 7, 2023, Simon announced her retirement from professional football in order to focus on her mental health.

== Personal life ==
In October 2022, the Yates Report was released, and detailed that her former coach at Sky Blue FC and Racing Louisville, Christy Holly, had sexually abused her multiple times. (Note: Simon allowed herself to be publicly identified in the report.)

== Honors ==
Houston Dash

- NWSL Challenge Cup: 2020
