= Katie Atkinson (soccer) =

American soccer player (born 1996)

- Atkinson with the Chicago Stars in 2026

Personal information
- Birth name: Katherine Ann Lund
- Date of birth: November 27, 1996 (age 29)
- Place of birth: Plano, Texas, United States
- Height: 6 ft 1 in (1.85 m)
- Position: Goalkeeper

Team information
- Current team: Chicago Stars
- Number: 27

College career
Years	Team	Apps	(Gls)
2016–2018	TCU Horned Frogs	50	(0)
2019	Arkansas Razorbacks	23	(0)

Senior career*
Years	Team	Apps	(Gls)
2020	Washington Spirit	0	(0)
2021–2025	Racing Louisville	80	(0)
2026–	Chicago Stars	15	(0)
- * Club domestic league appearances and goals as of 05:43, November 2, 2026 (UTC)

Katherine Atkinson (née Lund; born November 27, 1996) is an American professional soccer player who plays as a goalkeeper for Chicago Stars FC of the National Women's Soccer League (NWSL). She played college soccer for the TCU Horned Frogs and the Arkansas Razorbacks. She began her professional career with the Washington Spirit before being selected by Racing Louisville in the 2020 NWSL Expansion Draft.

== Club career ==
=== Racing Louisville ===
Racing Louisville selected Atkinson from Washington Spirit in the 2020 NWSL Expansion Draft. Atkinson led Racing Louisville FC to the inaugural Women's Cup win in August 2021.

Atkinson had a breakout season in 2022, setting the NWSL record for saves in a single season and being named to the NWSL Best XI for September/October. She started every regular-season game for Racing, posting six clean sheets.

Atkinson was one of three finalists for NWSL Goalkeeper of the Year for the 2023 season.

=== Chicago Stars ===
On December 15, 2025, Chicago Stars FC announced that they had signed Atkinson to a three-year contract through 2028.

== Personal life ==
She is married to Ryan Atkinson. The couple announced their engagement in November 2024.
