= Katie McClure =

American soccer player (born 1998)

Personal information
- Full name: Katie Marie McClure
- Date of birth: March 14, 1998 (age 28)
- Place of birth: Wichita, Kansas, United States
- Height: 5 ft 4 in (1.63 m)
- Position: Forward

Youth career
- –2016: Oklahoma FC

College career
Years	Team	Apps	(Gls)
2016–2019	Kansas Jayhawks	87	(39)

Senior career*
Years	Team	Apps	(Gls)
2020	Washington Spirit	0	(0)
2021	Racing Louisville	15	(1)
- * Club domestic league appearances and goals as of 17 December 2021

Katie Marie McClure (born March 14, 1998) is an American former professional soccer player. She played college soccer for Kansas Jayhawks before spending professional stints for the Washington Spirit and Racing Louisville FC of the National Women's Soccer League (NWSL).

== Club career ==
McClure made her NWSL debut with the Washington Spirit in the 2020 NWSL Challenge Cup on July 1, 2020.

On November 12, 2020, McClure was chosen by Racing Louisville FC in the 2020 NWSL Expansion Draft. In the following season, she scored the winning penalty kick against the Chicago Red Stars in The Women's Cup semifinal, and her first NWSL goal against the Orlando Pride on October 16. Following the 2021 season, Racing stated that McClure was departing the club.
