= 2021 NWSL Challenge Cup Championship =

Championship game of the 2021 NWSL Challenge Cup

- Event: 2021 NWSL Challenge Cup
Portland Thorns FC	NJ/NY Gotham FC
1	1
- Portland Thorns FC won 6–5 on penalties
- Date: May 8, 2021
- Venue: Providence Park, Portland, Oregon
- Player of the Match: Adrianna Franch, POR
- Referee: Natalie Simon
- Attendance: 4,588

The 2021 NWSL Challenge Cup Championship, the final match of the 2021 NWSL Challenge Cup, was a soccer match held on May 8, 2021 at Providence Park in Portland, Oregon, United States. It was contested by Portland Thorns FC and NJ/NY Gotham FC, the winners of the West and East Divisions, respectively, of the Challenge Cup. The match finished drawn 1–1 after 90 minutes, with the rules specifying that the teams would not play extra time but would instead proceed to a penalty shootout. The Thorns won the shootout 6–5 after 7 rounds, thus winning the Challenge Cup.

== Road to the final ==
Portland Thorns FC won the right to host the final by finishing with the best record across both divisions.

Note: In all results below, the score of the finalist is given first.

Portland Thorns FC		Round	NJ/NY Gotham FC	
Opponent	Result	Divisional play	Opponent	Result
Kansas City	2–1	Match 1	Orlando Pride	1–0
Chicago Red Stars	1–0	Match 2	North Carolina Courage	4–3
OL Reign	2–0	Match 3	Washington Spirit	0–0
Houston Dash	1–1	Match 4	Racing Louisville FC	0–0
Pos / Team / Pld / Pts; 1 / Portland Thorns FC / 4 / 10; 2 / OL Reign / 4 / 7; 3 / Houston Dash / 4 / 6; 4 / Chicago Red Stars / 4 / 2; 5 / Kansas City / 4 / 1; Source: NWSL		Final standings	Pos / Team / Pld / Pts; 1 / NJ/NY Gotham FC / 4 / 8; 2 / North Carolina Courage / 4 / 7; 3 / Orlando Pride / 4 / 5; 4 / Washington Spirit / 4 / 4; 5 / Racing Louisville FC / 4 / 2; Source: NWSL	

== Match ==
=== Details ===
Portland struck first, with Christine Sinclair winning the ball near midfield and then scoring from just outside Gotham's penalty box in the 8th minute. Portland generated several more chances in the first half but Gotham's defense successfully kept the score 1-0 until halftime. In the 61st minute, Carli Lloyd scored a header on a cross from Imani Dorsey, evening the match at 1-1. That score held until the end of the 90 minutes of regulation time. Tournament rules specified that there would be no extra time, so the match proceeded to a penalty shootout. In the first five rounds, each team had a shot rebound back off the crossbar—one by Jennifer Cudjoe for Gotham and one by Meghan Klingenberg for the Thorns. Both teams made their sixth-round shots, but in the seventh round, Nahomi Kawasumi of Gotham had her shot saved by Thorns goalkeeper Adrianna Franch. Morgan Weaver of the Thorns scored on her seventh-round attempt, winning the game and the 2021 Challenge Cup for Portland.

May 8, 2021
10:00 PT

Portland Thorns FC	1–1	NJ/NY Gotham FC
Sinclair 8'; Charley (yellow card) 79'	Report	Lewandowski (yellow card) 38'; Lloyd 61'
Penalties
Sinclair (penalty scored); Klingenberg (penalty missed); Horan (penalty scored); Rodríguez (penalty scored); Dunn (penalty scored); Sauerbrunn (penalty scored); Weaver (penalty scored)	6–5	(penalty scored) Long; (penalty scored) Lloyd; (penalty missed) Cudjoe; (penalty scored) Freeman; (penalty scored) Onumonu; (penalty scored) Viens; (penalty missed) Kawasumi

Providence Park, Portland, Oregon
Attendance: 4,588
Referee: Natalie Simon

Player of the Match:
Adrianna Franch, POR
Assistant referees:
Brooke Mayo
Deleana Quan
Fourth official:
Karen Callado
Reserve assistant referee:
Rachel Smith

Match rules

- 90 minutes.
- Penalty shoot-out if scores level.
- Maximum of five substitutions. (Note: Each team was given only three opportunities to make substitutions, excluding substitutions made at half-time.)

== Broadcasting ==
The match aired on CBS and Paramount+ in the United States, and on Twitch internationally. JP Dellacamera and Aly Wagner served as play-by-play announcer and analyst respectively on CBS, while Josh Eastern and Kaylyn Kyle did the same on Twitch. Marisa Pilla was the on-field reporter. CBS Sports soccer reporter Sandra Herrera and studio host Poppy Miller hosted the pre- and post-game shows on CBS Sports HQ along with Aly Wagner and Lori Lindsey.
