= Sinclaire Miramontez =

American soccer player

Personal information
- Full name: Sinclaire Morgan Miramontez
- Date of birth: April 11, 1998 (age 28)
- Height: 5 ft 6 in (1.68 m)
- Position: Defender

Youth career
- 2012-2015: Shawnee Mission West
- Sporting Blue Valley ECNL 97-98

College career
Years	Team	Apps	(Gls)
2016–2019	Nebraska Cornhuskers	76	(5)

Senior career*
Years	Team	Apps	(Gls)
2020	North Carolina Courage	0	(0)
2021	Racing Louisville FC	12	(0)
2022	OL Reign	0	(0)
- * Club domestic league appearances and goals

Sinclaire Morgan Miramontez (born April 11, 1998) is an American former professional soccer player who played as a defender. She played High School Soccer for Shawnee Mission West. Miramontez helped guide Shawnee Mission West to a pair of top-four finishes at the state tournament during her last two years with the team. Shawnee Mission West finished third in 2014 and fourth in 2015. Miramontez scored 11 goals for her career and added 20 assists. She was named a first-team All-American by TopDrawerSoccer.com in 2016. In addition, Miramontez was named first-team All-Sunflower League Defense on three occasions, first-team all-state defense twice, Sunflower League Defender of the Year in 2015 and Wendy's High School Heisman School Winner in 2015. Miramontez also played high school tennis for two years. Miramontez played club soccer for Sporting Blue Valley ECNL 97-98 under Coach Gareth Pritchard. She served as a team captain for four years and helped the team qualify for the top flight of ECNL Nationals all four years.. She played college soccer for the Nebraska Cornhuskers before spending time with the North Carolina Courage, Racing Louisville FC, and the OL Reign of the National Women's Soccer League (NWSL).

== Club career ==
Miramontez made her NWSL debut for the North Carolina Courage on October 4, 2020. She was waived by the team on March 24, 2021.

Miramontez was signed to Racing Louisville on May 21, 2021, after a successful trial period.

On December 10, 2021, OL Reign acquired Miramontez off waivers.

On January 22, 2023, Miramontez announced her retirement from professional soccer.

== Honors ==
OL Reign

- NWSL Shield: 2022
- The Women's Cup: 2022
