= Christy Holly =

Northern Irish football coach (born 1984)

Personal information
- Date of birth: 21 December 1984 (age 41)
- Place of birth: Derry, Northern Ireland

College career
Years	Team	Apps	(Gls)
- John Moores University

Senior career*
Years	Team	Apps	(Gls)
- Limavady United

Managerial career
- Georgian Court Lions (assistant)
- Sky Blue FC Reserves (assistant)
- 2013–2015: Sky Blue FC (assistant)
- 2016–2017: Sky Blue FC
- 2021: Racing Louisville
- * Club domestic league appearances and goals

Christy Holly (born 21 December 1984) is a Northern Irish former footballer and coach. From 12 August 2020 to 31 August 2021, he was the head coach of Racing Louisville in the National Women's Soccer League (NWSL). He previously coached NWSL club Sky Blue FC and at Georgian Court University.

== Playing career ==
Holly played in college for Liverpool John Moores University.

== Coaching career ==
After serving as an assistant coach in the Sky Blue FC organization for three years, Holly was named head coach in January 2016. He was asked to step down from that position on 16 August 2017, due to complaints of verbal and emotional abuse from players and because his relationship with then team captain, Christie Pearce, had become disruptive to the locker room.

In August 2020, he was hired as head coach of Racing Louisville.

=== Sexual assault and misconduct allegations ===
On 31 August 2021, Racing Louisville announced that Holly's contract had been terminated "for cause". It was revealed following a wider investigation into the NWSL in 2022 that Holly had been fired "with cause" due to alleged sexual abuse, with the report saying former Racing player Erin Simon had accused Holly of sexual coercion and sexual harassment.

According to Yates' report, Holly "repeated the same pattern of misconduct throughout his coaching career at both Sky Blue FC & Racing Louisville." The report says Holly sent Erin Simon explicit photos and also requested that she come to his house to review game film "and showed her pornography, while masturbating in front of her before she left," the report states. The report also found that Holly had never completed the licensing required to coach in the NWSL.

On 9 January 2023, Holly was banned from the NWSL for life, along with three other coaches named in the scandal.

== Personal life ==
Holly is a cousin of Gaelic footballer Barry McGoldrick.

Holly is currently engaged to Christie Pearce, former player and team captain at Sky Blue FC (now known as NJ/NY Gotham FC).

== Managerial statistics ==
All competitive league games (league and domestic cup) and international matches (including friendlies) are included as of 31 August 2021.

Team	Year	Record				
Team	Year	G	W	D	L	Win %
Sky Blue FC	2016–2017	38	14	7	17	36.84
Racing Louisville FC	2021	21	4	7	10	19.05
Career total		59	18	14	27	30.51
