= Emily Fox =

American soccer player (born 1998)

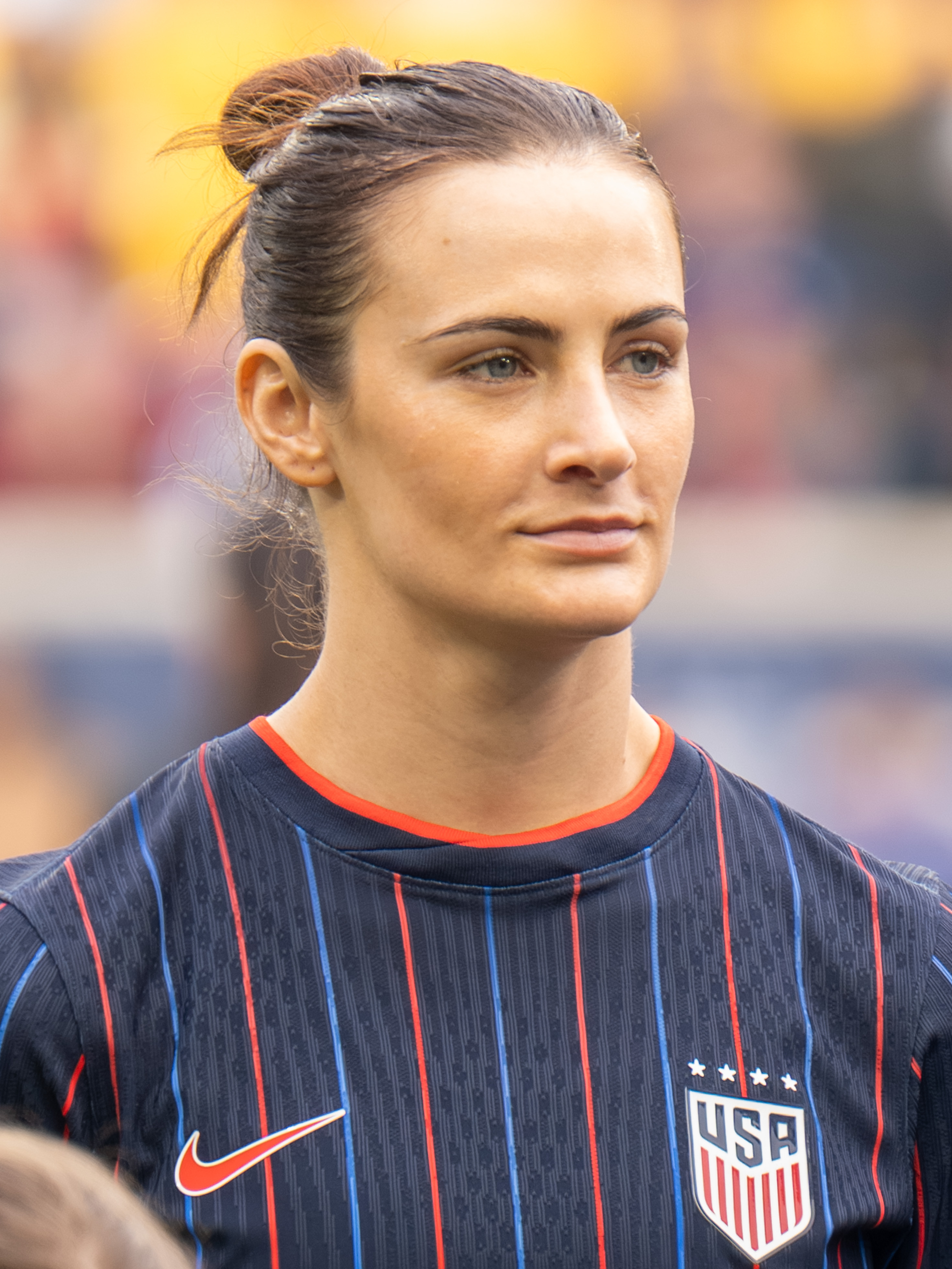
- Fox with the United States in 2026

Personal information
- Full name: Emily Ann Fox
- Date of birth: July 5, 1998 (age 28)
- Place of birth: Ashburn, Virginia, United States
- Height: 5 ft 5 in (1.65 m)
- Position: Right back

Team information
- Current team: Arsenal
- Number: 2

College career
| Years | Team | Apps | (Gls) |
| 2017–2020 | North Carolina Tar Heels | 69 | (2) |

Senior career*
| Years | Team | Apps | (Gls) |
| 2021–2022 | Racing Louisville | 40 | (1) |
| 2023 | North Carolina Courage | 18 | (0) |
| 2024– | Arsenal | 104 | (3) |

International career^{‡}
| 2015–2018 | United States U20 | 33 | (3) |
| 2018– | United States | 80 | (1) |
Medal record
Women's soccer
Representing United States
Olympic Games
| Gold medal – first place | 2024 Paris | Team |
CONCACAF W Championship
| Winner | 2022 Mexico |
CONCACAF W Gold Cup
| Winner | 2024 United States |
- * Club domestic league appearances and goals as of November 22, 2026 ‡ National team caps and goals as of October 24, 2026

Emily Ann Fox (born July 5, 1998) is an American professional soccer player who plays as a right back for Women's Super League club Arsenal and the United States national team. Prior to her move to the English club, she played for American teams Racing Louisville and North Carolina Courage.

Fox played college soccer for the North Carolina Tar Heels, where she was named first-team All-ACC three times. She was the first overall pick by Racing Louisville FC in the 2021 NWSL Draft. After two seasons, she was traded to the North Carolina Courage before signing with Arsenal in 2024.

Fox made her senior debut for the United States in 2018. She won a gold medal with the national team at the 2024 Paris Olympics.

== Early life and college career ==
Born and raised in Ashburn, Virginia to Leslie and Alex Fox, she has a brother and sister, Garrett and Lauren. She began playing soccer at the age of five. She also ran 5Ks and practiced gymnastics until middle school. She attended Stone Bridge High School. As a freshman Fox led the team with 16 goals, reaching the state championship game, and was named first-team all-state. She graduated one year early and entered the University of North Carolina in January 2017.

=== North Carolina Tar Heels (2017–2020) ===
Fox started the first thirteen games of her freshman fall season with the North Carolina before suffering a torn ACL and missing the rest of the season. She was named to the All-Atlantic Coast Conference third team and all-freshman team. In her sophomore season, due to her call-up to the USWNT in November 2018, she missed the ACC tournament semifinals and final and the first round of NCAA tournament. She returned in the third round as North Carolina made it all the way to the national final, where they fell 1–0 to Florida State. Fox was named to the All-ACC first team and the all-tournament team of the NCAA championship.

Fox led the team with 11 assists in the 2019 season and was named first-team All-ACC and first-team All-American. She assisted on the winning goals to Lotte Wubben-Moy and Alessia Russo in the semifinals and final respectively of ACC tournament, making the all-tournament team. She scored her first college goal in the first round of the NCAA tournament against Belmont and found her second goal to tie the game against USC in the quarterfinals but then tore her ACL for a second time in that game. North Carolina went on to win the game and reached another national final but lost to Stanford on penalties. Fox was again named first-team All-ACC after the fall 2020 season.

== Club career ==
=== Racing Louisville (2021–2022) ===
Fox was drafted by Racing Louisville FC as the first overall pick of the 2021 NWSL Draft. Fox played more minutes than any other NWSL rookie in 23 appearances for Racing. She led the league in interceptions, with 115, and was a finalist for the NWSL Rookie of the Year award. Fox was named to the NWSL Second XI for her performances in her rookie season. Ahead of the 2022 season, Fox was named as one of Racing's four team captains. Racing Louisville would fail to make the playoffs during Fox's time with the squad. The club would finish the regular season in 9th place for both seasons.

=== North Carolina Courage (2023) ===
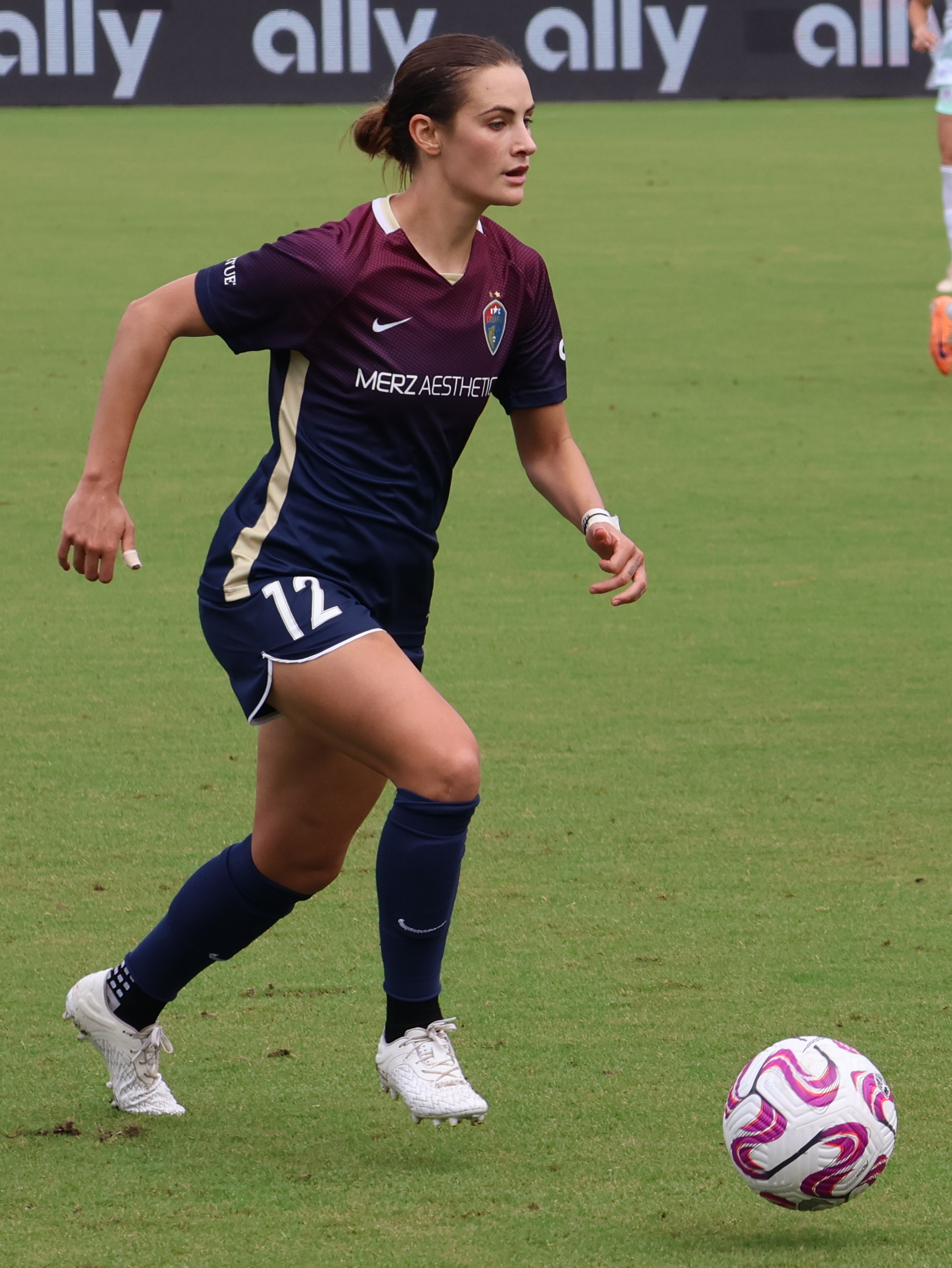
Fox playing for the Courage in the 2023 NWSL Challenge Cup final

In January 2023, Fox was traded to the North Carolina Courage in exchange for Abby Erceg and Carson Pickett. She was part of the squad that won the 2023 NWSL Challenge Cup, playing in four of the eight matches. She made 18 appearances (all starts) in the regular season as the Courage finished in third place; she was named to the NWSL Second XI for a second time at the end of the year.

=== Arsenal (2024–present) ===
On January 11, 2024, Fox signed with Arsenal. Three days later, she made her debut for the club in Arsenal's FA Cup win to Watford (5–1). On January 28, 2024, in her second league appearance, she recorded her first assist for Arsenal, setting up Vivianne Miedema's goal and also helped set up the second goal in a 2–0 victory against Liverpool. She was named player of the match.

Fox made her UEFA Women's Champions League debut with Arsenal on September 4, 2024, starting in a home match against Rangers which finished as a 6–0 victory. She scored her first goal for the club during a 4–1 Champions League group stage win against Vålerenga on October 16, 2024. At the beginning of December, Fox was named Arsenal’s player of the month for November. Reflecting on her first year at Arsenal, Fox felt that she has been pushed and challenged since making the move. On February 16, 2025, Fox scored her first WSL goal for Arsenal against Tottenham in the North London Derby in the 90th minute. Fox played all 90-minutes in the 2025 UEFA Women's Champions League final on May 24, 2025, and defeated defending champions FC Barcelona 1–0 to secure Arenal's first European title since 2007. Fox along with Arsenal teammate Jenna Nighswonger became the sixth and seventh Americans to win the UEFA Women's Champion League.

On 19 August 2025, it was announced that Fox was one of four gunners to be named to the WSL’s best XI, alongside teammates Mariona Caldentey, Kim Little and Alessia Russo.

On 16 September 2025, it was announced that Fox had been nominated for the CONCACAF Player of the Year award for 2024/25 season, as well as having been nominated for the Ballon d'Or.

== International career ==
=== Youth national team ===
In 2015, Fox was named to the roster for the 2015 CONCACAF Women's U-20 Championship. She scored a goal in the opening game of the tournament, a 2–2 draw vs Mexico. Fox appeared in every game of the tournament, as the U.S. captured their fifth CONCACAF Women's U-20 Championship. Fox was named to the squad for the 2016 FIFA U-20 Women's World Cup, she appeared in all six games for the U.S. as they finished fourth in the tournament.

Fox did not participate in the 2018 CONCACAF Women's U-20 Championship as she was still recovering from her ACL injury. She recovered in time to be named to the roster for the 2018 FIFA U-20 Women's World Cup, one of three players to return for a second U-20 World Cup. Fox appeared in one game as the U.S. failed to advance to the knockout stage.

=== Senior national team ===
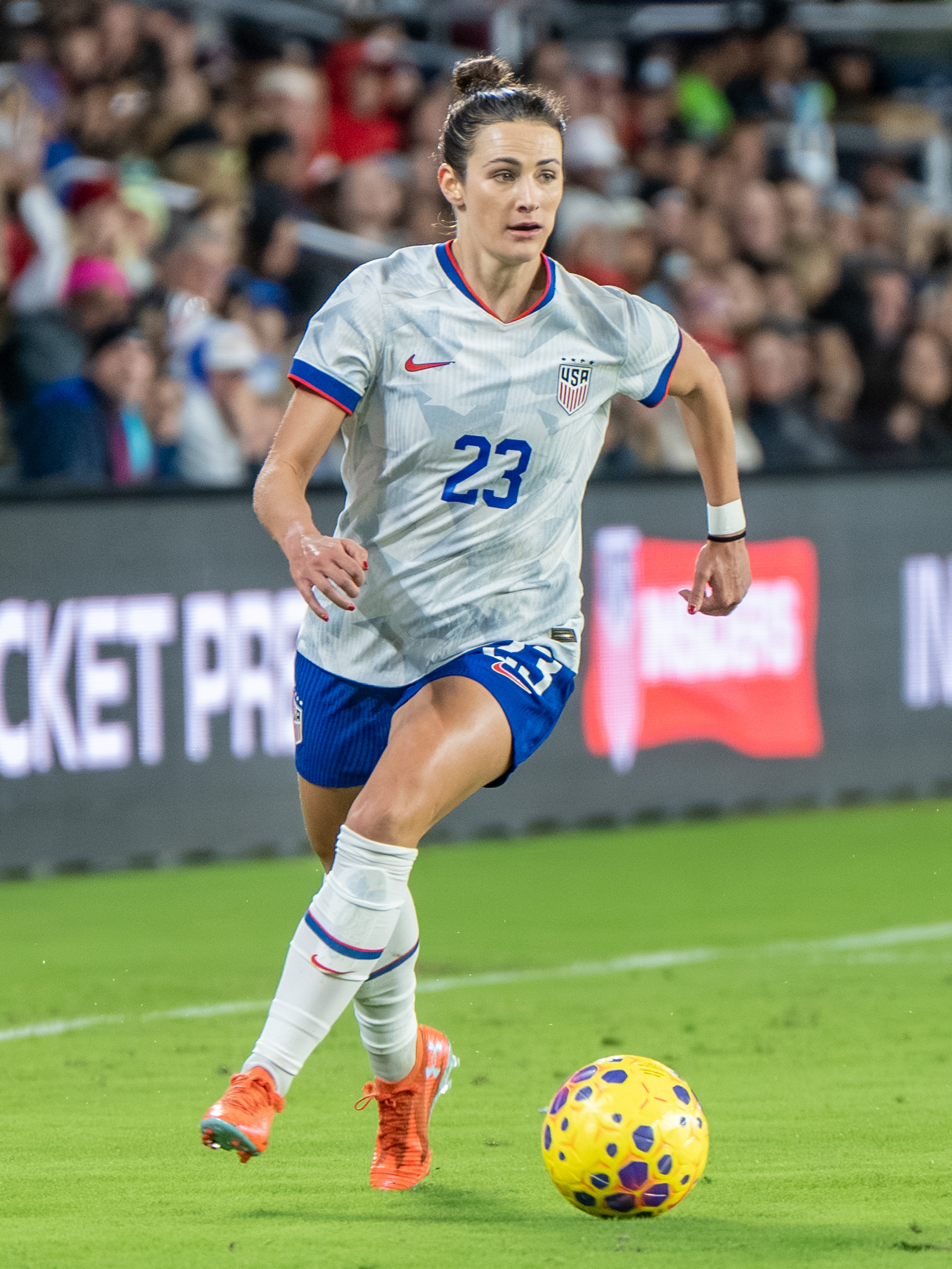
Fox with the United States in 2025

Fox received her first call-up to the senior national team in November 2018 for a set of friendlies in Europe. She earned her first cap on November 8, 2018, when she got the start at right back against Portugal. Fox was also in the starting lineup five days later against Scotland.

Fox was originally only named as a practice player for the USWNT training camp ahead of the 2019 SheBelieves Cup, but after Danielle Colaprico had to withdraw from the squad due to injury, Fox was added to the roster.

On February 3, 2022, Fox was named to the 2022 SheBelieves Cup roster for the tournament. The tournament included the United States, Iceland, New Zealand, and Czech Republic as participating squads. Fox started in all three matches for the United States. The U.S. would go on to win their 5th title after a draw in their first game.

Fox was named to the roster for the 2023 SheBelieves Cup and was the only player to play three full ninety minute games, 270 minutes overall, as the USWNT won the tournament for the fourth consecutive year, and sixth time overall. In the following national team camp for a set of friendlies against Ireland, Fox scored her first goal for the senior national team on April 8, 2023, which finished as a 2–0 victory. On June 21, 2023, Fox was named to the USWNT roster for the 2023 FIFA Women's World Cup in Australia and New Zealand. Fox started in all four matches and played all but 8 minutes, and was part of a defense that allowed just two shots on goal and one goal all tournament before the USWNT were ultimately eliminated on penalties by Sweden after a scoreless 0–0 draw in the Round of 16.

On April 9, 2024, Fox converted her first professional penalty in a shootout against Canada, to help win the 2024 SheBelieves Cup for the USWNT. After the match ended as a 2–2 draw, Fox converted the final penalty to finish the shootout at 5–4, and win the title for the seventh time. Fox was selected to the 18-player roster for the 2024 Summer Olympics in France and earned her fiftieth cap in a friendly against Mexico ahead of the Olympics on July 13, 2024. She started in all six matches during the Olympic tournament, including the gold medal match against Brazil, which the United States won 1–0 on a goal from Mallory Swanson.

On February 11, 2025, Fox was named to the 2025 SheBelieves Cup roster under manager Emma Hayes. Fox would feature in all three matches for the United States against Colombia, Australia, and Japan. The United States would lose to Japan to end their streak of SheBelieves Cup wins by finishing in 2nd place.

== Career statistics ==
=== Club ===
As of match played November 22, 2026

Appearances and goals by club, season and competition
| Club | Season | League | | | National cup (Note: Includes Women's FA Cup) | | League cup (Note: Includes NWSL Challenge Cup, FA Women's League Cup) | | Continental | | Other | | Total | |
| Club | Season | Division | Apps | Goals | Apps | Goals | Apps | Goals | Apps | Goals | Apps | Goals | Apps | Goals |
|---|---|---|---|---|---|---|---|---|---|---|---|---|---|---|
| Racing Louisville | 2021 | NWSL | 23 | 0 | — | | 4 | 0 | — | | — | | 27 | 0 |
| Racing Louisville | 2022 | NWSL | 17 | 1 | — | | 6 | 0 | — | | — | | 23 | 1 |
| Racing Louisville | Total | | 40 | 1 | — | | 10 | 0 | — | | — | | 50 | 1 |
| North Carolina Courage | 2023 | NWSL | 18 | 0 | — | | 4 | 0 | — | | 1 (Note: Appearance in NWSL Playoffs) | 0 | 23 | 0 |
| Arsenal | 2023–24 | WSL | 10 | 0 | 2 | 0 | 1 | 0 | 0 | 0 | — | | 13 | 0 |
| Arsenal | 2024–25 | WSL | 21 | 1 | 3 | 0 | 2 | 0 | 14 (Note: Appearances in UEFA Women's Champions League) | 1 | — | | 40 | 2 |
| Arsenal | 2025–26 | WSL | 20 | 0 | 3 | 0 | 1 | 0 | 12 | 1 | 1 (Note: Appearance in FIFA Women's Champions Cup) | 0 | 37 | 1 |
| Arsenal | 2026–27 | WSL | 11 | 0 | 0 | 0 | — | | 4 | 0 | — | | 15 | 0 |
| Arsenal | Total | | 62 | 1 | 8 | 0 | 4 | 0 | 30 | 2 | 1 | 0 | 105 | 3 |
| Career total | | | 120 | 2 | 8 | 0 | 18 | 0 | 30 | 2 | 2 | 0 | 178 | 4 |

=== International ===
As of match played October 13, 2026

Appearances and goals by national team and year
| National team | Year | Apps | Goals |
|---|---|---|---|
| United States | 2018 | 2 | 0 |
| United States | 2019 | 1 | 0 |
| United States | 2020 | 0 | 0 |
| United States | 2021 | 5 | 0 |
| United States | 2022 | 14 | 0 |
| United States | 2023 | 17 | 1 |
| United States | 2024 | 23 | 0 |
| United States | 2025 | 9 | 0 |
| United States | 2026 | 9 | 0 |
| Total | | 80 | 1 |

Scores and results list United States's goal tally first, score column indicates score after each Fox goal.

List of international goals scored by Emily Fox
| No. | Date | Venue | Opponent | Score | Result | Competition | Ref. |
|---|---|---|---|---|---|---|---|
| 1 | April 8, 2023 | Austin, Texas | Republic of Ireland | 1–0 | 2–0 | Friendly | |

== Honors ==
Racing Louisville FC

- The Women's Cup: 2021

North Carolina Courage

- NWSL Challenge Cup: 2023

Arsenal

- FA Women's League Cup: 2023–24
- UEFA Women's Champions League: 2024–25
- FIFA Women's Champions Cup: 2026

United States

- Summer Olympic Games Gold Medal: 2024
- CONCACAF W Championship: 2022
- CONCACAF W Gold Cup: 2024
- SheBelieves Cup: 2022, 2023, 2024, 2026

Individual

- First-Team All-America:2019
- First Team All-ACC: 2018, 2019
- NCAA College Cup All-Tournament: 2018
- ACC All-Academic Team: 2018, 2019
- ACC All-Tournament: 2019
- All-Atlantic Region First Team: 2019
- Hermann Trophy Semi-Finalist 2019
- Honda Sports Award Finalist 2020 (soccer)
- NWSL Team of the Month: May 2021, March/April 2023
- NWSL Best XI Second Team: 2021, 2023
- UEFA Women's Champions League Team of the Season: 2024–25, 2025–26
- PFA WSL Team of the Year: 2024–25, 2025–26

== See also ==
- List of 2024 Summer Olympics medal winners
- List of foreign Women's Super League players
- List of University of North Carolina at Chapel Hill alumni
