= 2017 Sky Blue FC season =

Sky Blue FC
2017 season
- President & CEO: Thomas Hofstetter
- Head coach: Christy Holly (until Aug. 16); Dave Hodgson (after Aug. 16)
- Stadium: Yurcak Field; Piscataway, New Jersey (Capacity: 5,000)
- NWSL: 6th
- Top goalscorer: Samantha Kerr (17)
- Highest home attendance: 3,451 (May 27 vs. Orlando)
- Lowest home attendance: 2,008 (September 10 vs. Washington)
- Average home league attendance: 2,613
Home colors	Away colors

The 2017 Sky Blue FC season was the team's eighth season as a professional women's soccer team. Sky Blue FC plays in the National Women's Soccer League, the top tier of women's soccer in the United States.

== Review ==
After a 7th-place finish in 2016, Sky Blue FC finished the 2017 season in 6th place, five points out of playoff contention. Sam Kerr scored a league-record 17 goals, won the league's Golden Boot award, and was named MVP, the first time a player on a non-playoff team had won the award.

Raquel Rodriguez set the NWSL record for fastest goal scored with a 25-second strike against Portland Thorns FC on June 17.

Head coach Christy Holly resigned mid-season on August 16, and was replaced by four assistant coaches, Jill Loyden, Dave Hodgson, Paul Greig, and Maria Dorris. A full-time replacement for Holly was not announced until November 15, 2017, when Sky Blue FC hired Washington Spirit assistant coach and former Jersey Sky Blue head coach Denise Reddy.

Soon after Holly's resignation, center back and team captain Christie Rampone announced that she would miss the rest of the season due to an accumulation of injuries.

== Team ==
=== First-team roster ===
As of June 17, 2017

Note: Flags indicate national team as defined under FIFA eligibility rules; some limited exceptions apply. Players may hold more than one non-FIFA nationality.

No.	Pos.	Nation	Player
1	GK	CAN	Kailen Sheridan
2	FW	USA	McKenzie Meehan
3	DF	USA	Christie Pearce
5	FW	USA	Maya Hayes
6	MF	USA	Taylor Lytle
7	MF	USA	Nikki Stanton
8	DF	USA	Erica Skroski
10	MF	USA	Daphne Corboz
11	MF	CRC	Raquel Rodriguez
12	FW	USA	Kim DeCesare
15	DF	USA	Kayla Mills

No.	Pos.	Nation	Player
16	MF	USA	Sarah Killion
17	DF	USA	Domi Richardson
19	FW	USA	Kelley O'Hara
20	FW	AUS	Samantha Kerr
21	FW	ENG	Leah Galton
22	DF	USA	Mandy Freeman
27	GK	USA	Caroline Casey
32	FW	USA	Natasha Kai
33	DF	USA	Erin Simon
73	MF	USA	Madison Tiernan

== Competitions ==
=== National Women's Soccer League ===
==== Preseason ====
25 March 2017	Sky Blue FC	3–1	St. John's University	Queens, NY
	Hayes 12' (Corboz); O'Hara 14' (Mills); Killion 43'		Bellero 6'	Stadium: Belson Stadium

1 April 2017	Sky Blue FC	1–0	University of North Carolina	Lakewood, NJ
	Rodriguez 16' (Hayes)	(Note: "Sky Blue FC Blanks University of North Carolina in Preseason Action". Sky Blue FC. April 1, 2017.)		Stadium: Georgian Court University

9 April 2017	Sky Blue FC	3–0	Penn State University	Lakewood, NJ
	Kerr 28' (Mills), 62' (Hayes); Corboz 90' (Meehan)			Stadium: Georgian Court University

==== Regular season ====
15 April 2017 1	Seattle Reign FC	1–1	Sky Blue FC	Seattle, WA
7:00 p.m. PST	Killion 62' (pen.)		Rapinoe 56' (pen.); Mathias (yellow card) 62'	Stadium: Memorial Stadium; Attendance: 3,521; Referee: Karen Abt; Assistant referees: Jeremy Weed, Cephas Quartson; Fourth official: Levi Rippy; Man of the Match: Christie Pearce

23 April 2017 2	Boston Breakers	1–0	Sky Blue FC	Boston, MA
4:00 p.m. EST			Dowie 37' (Lavelle); Salem (yellow card) 86'	Stadium: Jordan Field; Attendance: 2,329; Referee: Elvis Osmanovic; Assistant referees: Benjamin Wooten, Tom Felice; Fourth official: Michael Dee; Man of the Match: Sarah Killion

30 April 2017 3	Sky Blue FC	1–0	FC Kansas City	Piscataway, NJ
6:00 p.m. EST	Rodriguez (yellow card) 73', (goal) 83' (Freeman); Tiernan (yellow card) 90+1'			Stadium: Yurcak Field; Attendance: 2,562; Referee: Kevin Broadley; Assistant referees: Art Arustamyan, Gjovalin Bori; Fourth official: Joe Zawistowski; Man of the Match: Raquel Rodriguez

6 May 2017 4	Washington Spirit	4–3	Sky Blue FC	Boyds, MD
7:00 p.m. EST	Ordega 6' (Jensen), 56'; Simon 25' (o.g.); Solaun 34' (Ordega), (yellow card) 85'		O'Hara 12'; Simon (yellow card) 39'; Killion 50' (O'Hara), 70' (pen.)	Stadium: Maryland SoccerPlex; Attendance: 3,190; Referee: Danielle Chesky; Assistant referees: Adrienne McDonald, Brooke Mayo; Fourth official: Ali Saheli; Man of the Match: Kelley O'Hara

13 May 2017 5	Houston Dash	1–3	Sky Blue FC	Houston, TX
3:00 p.m. CST	Poliana 76' (Ohai); Brooks (yellow card) 87'		Kerr (yellow card) 17'; Killion 33' (pen.); Galton 53' (Kerr); Rodriguez (yellow card) 65'; Kerr 87' (Meehan)	Stadium: BBVA Compass Stadium; Attendance: 5,369; Referee: Michael Radchuk; Assistant referees: Francisco Bermudez, Jeremy Kieso; Fourth official: Mike Arrington; Man of the Match: Samantha Kerr
Note: Televised live on Lifetime.

20 May 2017 6	Sky Blue FC	2–1	Houston Dash	Piscataway, NJ
4:00 p.m. EST	Killion 20' (pen.); Rodriguez 85'; Tiernan (yellow card) 89'		Daly (yellow card) 21'; Andressinha 40'; Privett (yellow card) 84'	Stadium: Yurcak Field; Attendance: 2,476; Referee: Christina Unkel; Assistant referees: Tom Felice, Maggie Short; Fourth official: Luis Arroyo; Man of the Match: Christie Pearce
Note: Televised live on Lifetime.

24 May 2017 7	North Carolina Courage	2–0	Sky Blue FC	Cary, NC
7:30 p.m. EST	Williams; Erceg (yellow card) 26'; Mewis 42'		Killion (yellow card) 47'; Stanton (yellow card) 59'	Stadium: Sahlen's Stadium; Attendance: 2,383; Referee: Kevin Broadley; Assistant referees: Benjamin Wooten, Gregory Brigman; Fourth official: Javier Rodriguez; Man of the Match: Kailen Sheridan

27 May 2017 8	Sky Blue FC	2–1	Orlando Pride	Piscataway, NJ
7:00 p.m. EST	Kerr 43' (Corboz); Hayes 82' (Kerr)		Spencer 18' (Camila)	Stadium: Yurcak Field; Attendance: 3,451; Referee: Robi Hullner; Assistant referees: John Krill, Ben Pilgrim; Fourth official: Amber O’Connor; Man of the Match: Maya Hayes

3 June 2017 9	Sky Blue FC	0–2	Portland Thorns FC	Piscataway, NJ
7:00 p.m. EST	Mills (yellow card) 20'; O'Hara (yellow card) 89'		Horan 20' (Nadim), 42' (Klingenberg), (yellow card) 59'; Cox (yellow card) 77'	Stadium: Yurcak Field; Attendance: 2,418; Referee: Marco Vega; Assistant referees: Amanda Ross, Tom Felice; Fourth official: Lorant Varga; Man of the Match: Madison Tiernan

17 June 2017 10	Portland Thorns FC	1–3	Sky Blue FC	Portland, OR
7:00 p.m. PST	Sinclair 90+5' (pen.); Henry (yellow card) 90+1'	(Note: "Sam Kerr Records Brace, Raquel Rodriguez Ties Fastest Goal in NWSL History". Sky Blue FC. June 17, 2017.)	Rodriguez 1' (Kerr); O'Hara (yellow card) 74'; Kerr 70' (Hayes), 88' (Tiernan); Stanton (yellow card) 90'	Stadium: Providence Park; Attendance: 16,736; Referee: Timothy Ford; Assistant referees: Deleana Quan, JJ Blodgett; Fourth official: Cephas Quartson

25 June 2017 11	Chicago Red Stars	2–1	Sky Blue FC	Bridgeview, IL
5:00 p.m. CST	DiBernardo 63'; Huerta 67' (Short)	(Note: "Sky Blue FC Unable to Hold Off Red Stars". Sky Blue FC. June 25, 2017.) (Note: "Chicago Defeats Sky Blue FC to Extend Undefeated Streak". Chicago Red Stars. June 28, 2017.)	Tiernan 3' (Lytle)	Stadium: Toyota Park; Attendance: 3,720; Referee: Karen Abt; Assistant referees: TJ Zablocki, Jeremy Kieso; Fourth official: Calin Radosav

28 June 2017 12	Sky Blue FC	2–3	Orlando Pride	Piscataway, NJ
7:00 p.m. EST	O'Hara 45' (pen.); Kerr 46' (Hayes); Stanton (yellow card) 90+4'	(Note: "Sky Blue FC Suffers Home Loss to Orlando Pride". Sky Blue FC. June 28, 2017.)	Ubogagu 11'; Spencer (yellow card) 75'; Marta 77'; Hill 86' (Catley)	Stadium: Yurcak Field; Attendance: 3,065; Referee: Danielle Chesky; Assistant referees: Jeffrey Skinner, Victor Vazqez; Fourth official: Luis Arroyo

1 July 2017 13	North Carolina Courage	0–1	Sky Blue FC	Cary, NC
3:30 p.m. EST	Skroski (yellow card) 67'; Kerr 84' (Hayes)		Witteman (yellow card) 80'	Stadium: Sahlen's Stadium; Attendance: 3,056; Referee: Greg Dopka; Assistant referees: Cory Richardson, Trent Vanhaitsma; Fourth official: Javier Rodriguez
Note: Televised live on Lifetime.

8 July 2017 14	Sky Blue FC	3–2	FC Kansas City	Piscataway, NJ
7:00 p.m. EST	Skroski (yellow card) 45+4'; Kerr 78' (O'Hara), 81' (Corboz), 90' (Taylor Lytle)		Bowen 29' (Gibbons); Gibbons 42' (Scott); Groom (red card) 45+4'	Stadium: Yurcak Field; Attendance: 2,091; Referee: Amber O'Connor
Note: 100th match in franchise history.

15 July 2017 15	Sky Blue FC	2–2	Chicago Red Stars	Piscataway, NJ
7:00 p.m. EST	Stanton (yellow card) 2'; Kerr (yellow card) 38', (goal) 90' (Killion); Erica Skroski (yellow card) 75'; Kelley O'Hara (yellow card) 79'; Hayes 32'	Report	Huerta 4' (Press); Press 26' (Vanessa DiBernardo)	Stadium: Yurcak Field; Attendance: 2,529

22 July 2017 16	Seattle Reign FC	5–4	Sky Blue FC	Seattle, WA
7:00 p.m. PST	Rapinoe 27' 47' (pen.) (yellow card) 80' (goal) 87'; Mathias (yellow card) 30'; Yanez 49'; Skroski 56' (o.g.)	Report	O'Hara 60' (pen.); Galton 64'; Corboz 72'; Kerr 75'; Tiernan (yellow card) 89'	Stadium: Memorial Stadium; Attendance: 4,464; Referee: Greg Dopka; Assistant referees: Brooke Mayo, Andrew Deuker; Fourth official: Jeff Arthurholtz

4 August 2017 17	Sky Blue FC	1–4	Washington Spirit	Piscataway, NJ
7:00 p.m. EST	Hayes 2'	Report	Ship 51'; Church (yellow card) 57'; Williams 61'; Dougherty 73'; Solaun 87' (pen.)	Stadium: Yurcak Field; Attendance: 2,496; Referee: Gustavo Solorio; Assistant referees: Giovalin Bori, Victor Vásquez; Fourth official: Luis Arroyo

12 August 2017 18	Orlando Pride	5–0	Sky Blue FC	Orlando, FL
7:30 p.m. EST	Morgan 4' 47'; Weatherholt 43'; Marta 53' 58'	Report		Stadium: Orlando City Stadium; Attendance: 5,243; Referee: Elvis Osmanovic; Assistant referees: Ben Wooten, Ian Mckay; Fourth official: Erika Barahona

19 August 2017 19	Sky Blue FC	5–4	Seattle Reign FC	Piscataway, NJ
7:00 p.m. EST	Kerr 48' 68' 71' 90+4'; Hayes (yellow card) 81' (goal) 90+1'	Report	Johnson 3'; Fishlock 18'; Kawasumi 45+2'; Dallstream 85'	Stadium: Yurcak Field; Attendance: 3,325; Referee: Chris Spivey; Assistant referees: Jeremy Weed, Amilcar Sicaju; Fourth official: Henrik Karlsson

26 August 2017 20	Sky Blue FC	1–0	Boston Breakers	Piscataway, NJ
7:00 p.m. EST	Kerr 5'; Stanton (yellow card) 57'	Report	Leon (yellow card) 60'; King (yellow card) 90+1'	Stadium: Yurcak Field; Attendance: 2,244; Referee: Christina Unkel; Assistant referees: Amanda Ross, Trent Vanhaitsma; Fourth official: Joseph Zawistowski

3 September 2017 21	FC Kansas City	4–1	Sky Blue FC	Kansas City, MO
5:00 p.m. CST	LaBonta 39'; Groom 44' 64'; Leroux 90+4'	Report	Tiernan 83'	Stadium: Swope Soccer Village; Attendance: 1,571; Referee: Luis Guardia; Assistant referees: Thomas Zablocki, Emily Fletcher; Fourth official: Devin Blazek

10 September 2017 22	Sky Blue FC	1–2	Washington Spirit	Piscataway, NJ
6:00 p.m. EST	Hayes 43'	Report	Church 75'; Pugh 85'	Stadium: Yurcak Field; Attendance: 2,008; Referee: Becky Pagan; Assistant referees: Tom Felice, Ian Mckay; Fourth official: Jared Simons

24 September 2017 23	Sky Blue FC	1–1	North Carolina Courage	Piscataway, NJ
6:00 p.m. EST	Rodriguez 75' (Kerr)	Report	Hatch 27' (Hamilton)	Stadium: Yurcak Field; Attendance: 2,690

30 September 2017 24	Boston Breakers	3–4	Sky Blue FC	Boston, MA
7:00 p.m. EST	Dowie 25' (Purce), 28' (Weimer); Casey 85' (o.g.)	Report	Kerr 34' (Hayes); Tiernan 76' (O'Hara); Skroski 78' (Lytle); O'Hara 87' (Galton)	Stadium: Jordan Field; Attendance: 3,497

=== League table ===
Pos	Team	Pld	W	D	L	GF	GA	GD	Pts	Qualification
1	North Carolina Courage	24	16	1	7	38	22	+16	49	NWSL Shield
2	Portland Thorns FC (C)	24	14	5	5	37	20	+17	47	NWSL Playoffs
3	Orlando Pride	24	11	7	6	45	31	+14	40	NWSL Playoffs
4	Chicago Red Stars	24	11	6	7	33	30	+3	39	NWSL Playoffs
5	Seattle Reign FC	24	9	7	8	43	37	+6	34	
6	Sky Blue FC	24	10	3	11	42	51	−9	33	
7	FC Kansas City	24	8	7	9	29	31	−2	31	
8	Houston Dash	24	7	3	14	23	39	−16	24	
9	Boston Breakers	24	4	7	13	24	35	−11	19	
10	Washington Spirit	24	5	4	15	30	48	−18	19	

Source: NWSL
Rules for classification: Tiebreakers
(C) Champions

=== Results summary ===
Overall								Home						Away					
Pld	W	D	L	GF	GA	GD	Pts	W	D	L	GF	GA	GD	W	D	L	GF	GA	GD
24	10	3	11	42	51	−9	33	6	2	4	21	22	−1	4	1	7	21	29	−8

Last updated: September 30, 2017.
Source: NWSLsoccer.com

=== Results by round ===
Round	1	2	3	4	5	6	7	8	9	10	11	12	13	14	15	16	17	18	19	20	21	22	23	24
Stadium	A	A	H	A	A	H	A	H	H	A	A	H	A	H	H	A	H	A	H	H	A	H	H	A
Result	D	L	W	L	W	W	L	W	L	W	L	L	W	W	D	L	L	L	W	W	L	L	D	W
Position	5	10	6	7	6	6	3	3	4	3	3	5	4	3	3	5	6	6	6	5	6	6	7	6

Updated to match(es) played on September 30, 2017. Source: NWSLsoccer.com
A = Away; H = Home; W = Win; D = Draw; L = Loss

== Honors and awards ==
=== NWSL Yearly Awards ===
==== NWSL Individual Awards ====
Player	Awards	Yearly Statline	Ref.
(Australia) Samantha Kerr	Most Valuable Player; Golden Boot; Best X1	17 Goals; 4 Assists; 2 Hat tricks, 1 4-Goal Game	

==== NWSL Player of the Month ====
Month	Player of the Month	Statline	Ref.
May	(Australia) Samantha Kerr	2 goals, 2 assists in 5 games; Sky Blue FC 3–2–0 in May	
June	(Australia) Samantha Kerr	3 goals, 1 assist in 4 games; 30th career goal	

==== NWSL Team of the Month ====
Month	Goalkeeper	Defenders	Midfielders	Forwards	Ref.
May	(Canada) Kailen Sheridan		(United States) Sarah Killion	(Australia) Samantha Kerr	
June				(Australia) Samantha Kerr	

=== NWSL Weekly Awards ===
==== NWSL Player of the Week ====
Week	Player of the Week	Statline	Ref.
9	(Australia) Samantha Kerr	2 goals, 1 assist; road win at Portland	

==== NWSL Goal of the Week ====
Week	Result	Player	Ref.
3	Nominated	(Costa Rica) Raquel Rodriguez	
5	Nominated	(England) Leah Galton	
9	Nominated	(Australia) Samantha Kerr	
10	Nominated	(United States) Madison Tiernan	
11	Won	(Australia) Samantha Kerr	

==== NWSL Save of the Week ====
Week	Result	Player	Ref.
7	Nominated	(Canada) Kailen Sheridan	
9	Nominated	(Canada) Kailen Sheridan	
10	Nominated	(Canada) Kailen Sheridan	

== Statistics ==
As of June 18, 2017

N	Pos	Player	GP	GS	Min	G	A	PK	Shot	SOG	SOG%	CK	Off	Foul	YC	RC
16	MF	Sarah Killion	10	10	900	5	0	6	9	6	66.67%	1	1	8	1	0
20	FW	Samantha Kerr	9	8	752	9	3	0	23	17	73.91%	0	7	9	1	0
11	MF	Raquel Rodriguez	9	8	710	3	0	0	13	8	61.54%	0	0	15	2	0
19	FW	Kelley O'Hara	8	8	720	1	1	0	15	8	53.33%	35	4	14	2	0
5	FW	Maya Hayes	8	3	295	1	1	0	3	2	66.67%	0	1	2	0	0
21	FW	Leah Galton	10	6	540	1	0	0	4	4	100.00%	1	1	0	0	0
2	FW	McKenzie Meehan	7	2	239	0	1	0	9	6	66.67%	0	1	2	0	0
22	DF	Mandy Freeman	10	10	900	0	1	0	1	1	100.00%	0	0	2	0	0
73	MF	Madison Tiernan	8	2	257	0	1	0	4	1	25.00%	0	0	9	2	0
10	MF	Daphne Corboz	7	3	292	0	1	0	2	2	100.00%	11	1	2	0	0
12	FW	Kim DeCesare	0	0	0	0	0	0	0	0	--	0	0	0	0	0
3	DF	Christie Pearce	8	8	720	0	0	0	0	0	--	0	0	0	0	0
8	DF	Erica Skroski	8	8	680	0	0	0	0	0	--	0	1	9	0	0
17	DF	Dominique Richardson	0	0	0	0	0	0	0	0	--	0	0	0	0	0
6	MF	Taylor Lytle	8	8	614	0	0	0	6	1	16.67%	1	2	2	0	0
7	MF	Nikki Stanton	5	4	298	0	0	0	1	0	0.00%	0	0	6	2	0
33	DF	Erin Simon	5	5	438	0	0	0	0	0	--	0	0	4	1	0
1	GK	Kailen Sheridan	10	10	900	0	0	0	1	0	0.00%	0	0	0	0	0
32	FW	Tasha Kai	0	0	0	0	0	0	0	0	--	0	0	0	0	0
15	DF	Kayla Mills	9	7	645	0	0	0	1	0	0.00%	0	0	17	1	0
27	GK	Caroline Casey	0	0	0	0	0	0	0	0	--	0	0	0	0	0
Team Total			139	110	9900	15	9	6	92	56	60.87%	49	19	101	12	0

== See also ==
- 2017 National Women's Soccer League season
- 2017 in American soccer
