= 2018 Sky Blue FC season =

Sky Blue FC
2018 season
- President & CEO: Thomas Hofstetter
- Head coach: Denise Reddy
- Stadium: Yurcak Field; Piscataway, New Jersey (Capacity: 5,000)
- Top goalscorer: Carli Lloyd; Imani Dorsey; Katie Johnson (4)
Home colors	Away colors

The 2018 Sky Blue FC season was the team's ninth season as a professional women's soccer team. Sky Blue FC plays in the National Women's Soccer League, the top tier of women's soccer in the United States. Sky Blue had a difficult season in 2018 as they finished in last place. They went 23 games without winning a game, setting the mark for the longest winless streak in NWSL history. Sky Blue finally won on September 8 as they beat the Orlando Pride 1-0 in their final game of the 2018 season.

There were numerous reports of off-field issues that came out after former Sky Blue player Sam Kerr spoke to the media following the Sky Blue vs Chicago game on July 7. Reports of poor management and training facilities as well as housing, travel, and transportation issues were also reported, and were believed to be contributing factors to the team's poor performance on the field.

== Team ==
=== First-team roster ===
Source: Sky Blue FC

Note: Flags indicate national team as defined under FIFA eligibility rules; some limited exceptions apply. Players may hold more than one non-FIFA nationality.

No.	Pos.	Nation	Player
1	GK	CAN	Kailen Sheridan
2	FW	USA	McKenzie Meehan
6	FW	USA	Shea Groom
7	FW	USA	Jen Hoy
8	DF	USA	Erica Skroski
9	DF	USA	Amanda Frisbie
10	MF	USA	Carli Lloyd
11	MF	CRC	Raquel Rodriguez
13	DF	NZL	Rebekah Stott

No.	Pos.	Nation	Player
14	FW	MEX	Katie Johnson
16	MF	USA	Sarah Killion
17	DF	USA	Domi Richardson
21	FW	USA	Savannah McCaskill
22	DF	USA	Mandy Freeman
27	GK	USA	Caroline Casey
28	MF	USA	Imani Dorsey
29	DF	CAN	Amandine Pierre-Louis
31	DF	USA	Christina Gibbons
73	MF	USA	Madison Tiernan

== Match results ==
=== Preseason ===
24 February 2018	Sky Blue FC	0–1	PSU	Manalapan, New Jersey
2:00 p.m.		Report	Jean 73'	Stadium: Sportika Sports

3 March 2018	Sky Blue FC	2–1	UNC	Manalapan, New Jersey
	Groom 8' (Meehan); Meehan 75' (Groom)	Report	UNC Goal 43'	Stadium: Sportika Sports

10 March 2018	Sky Blue FC	1–0	WVU	Manalapan, New Jersey
1:00 p.m.	Rodriguez 29' (penalty)	Report		Stadium: Sportika Sports

18 March 2018	Sky Blue FC	6–0	St. John's University	Manalapan, New Jersey
2:00 p.m.	Beckie 11'; Rodriguez 34'; Beckie 46' (Groom); Leon 56' (McCaskill); McCaskill 63'; Groom 65'	Report		Stadium: Sportika Sports

=== Regular season ===
31 March 2018 1	North Carolina Courage	1–0	Sky Blue FC	Cary, North Carolina
3:00 p.m. EST	McDonald 90+2' (Hinkle)	Report	Gibbons (yellow card) 66'; Rebekah Stott (yellow card) 86'	Stadium: Sahlen's Stadium; Attendance: 4,078; Referee: Danielle Chesky; Assistant referees: Jennifer Garner, Jordan Davis; Fourth official: Forrest Ambrose; Man of the Match: Erica Skroski

15 April 2018 2	Sky Blue FC	0–1	Seattle Reign FC	Piscataway, New Jersey
5:00 p.m. EST	McCaskill (yellow card) 50'	Box; Report	Rapinoe 6' (pen.); Dallstream (yellow card) 82'	Stadium: Yurcak Field; Attendance: 1,913

21 April 2018 3	Chicago Red Stars	1–1	Sky Blue FC	Bridgeview, Illinois
8:00 p.m. EST	Huerta 1' (Mautz)	Report	McCaskill 78' (Johnson)	Stadium: Toyota Park; Attendance: 2,413

5 May 2018 4	Sky Blue FC	2–3	Houston Dash	Piscataway, New Jersey
7:00 p.m. EST	Johnson 57' (Groom), 73' (Killion); McCaskill (yellow card) 64'	Report	Prince 24' (Agnew); Daly 59' (Ohai) (yellow card) 84'; Latsko 79' (Kgatlana)	Stadium: Yurcak Field; Attendance: 2,065

12 May 2018 5	Seattle Reign FC	4–1	Sky Blue FC	Seattle, Washington
10:00 p.m. EST	Taylor 5' (Catley) (yellow card) 88'; Rapinoe 38', 60' (Kawasumi); Long 84'	Box; Report	Skroski (yellow card) 21'; McCaskill 62' (Lloyd)	Stadium: Memorial Stadium; Attendance: 3,607

19 May 2018 6	Sky Blue FC	1–2	North Carolina Courage	Piscataway, New Jersey
7:00 p.m. EST	Lloyd (yellow card) 15' (goal) 90+4' (Killion); Tiernan (yellow card) 85'	Report	Dunn 19' (McDonald); Mewis 27'; Rowland (yellow card) 70'	Stadium: Yurcak Field; Attendance: 1,923; Referee: Danielle Chesky

23 May 2018 7	Washington Spirit	1–0	Sky Blue FC	Boyds, Maryland
7:30 p.m. EST	Ordega (yellow card) 16'; Hatch 64' (Sullivan)	Report		Stadium: Maryland SoccerPlex; Attendance: 2,433

26 May 2018 8	Sky Blue FC	0–1	Seattle Reign FC	Piscataway, New Jersey
7:00 p.m. EST		Report	Rapinoe 64' (Westphal)	Stadium: Yurcak Field; Attendance: 2,814

2 June 2018 9	Sky Blue FC	1–2	Utah Royals FC	Piscataway, New Jersey
7:00 p.m. EST	Groom 10' (Johnson); Tiernan (yellow card) 90+2'	Report	Matheson 3' (Jónsdóttir); Freeman 85' (o.g.)	Stadium: Yurcak Field; Attendance: 2,229; Referee: Lorant Varga; Assistant referees: Walter Heatherly, Matthew Osterhouse; Fourth official: Szczepan Dziewa

8 June 2018 10	Sky Blue FC	0–0	Washington Spirit	Piscataway, New Jersey
7:00 p.m. EST	Meehan (yellow card) 39'; Killion (yellow card) 67'	Report	Dougherty Howard (yellow card) 50'; Dydasco (yellow card) 88'	Stadium: Yurcak Field; Attendance: 2,188

16 June 2018 11	Orlando Pride	3–2	Sky Blue FC	Orlando, Florida
7:30 p.m. EST	Leroux 2' (Ubogagu), 31' (Nairn) (yellow card) 75'; Hill 83' (Morgan)	Report	McCaskill 16'; Tiernan 37'; Gibbons (yellow card) 45+1'; Lloyd (yellow card) 85'	Stadium: Orlando City Stadium; Attendance: 4,445

27 June 2018 12	Portland Thorns FC	1–1	Sky Blue FC	Portland, Oregon
10:30 p.m. EST	Horan 45' (Sinclair); Salem (yellow card) 90+2'	Report	Beckie (yellow card) 41'; Lloyd 77' (pen.); Freeman (yellow card) 90+3'	Stadium: Providence Park; Attendance: 18,237

30 June 2018 13	Utah Royals FC	3–1	Sky Blue FC	Sandy, Utah
10:00 p.m. EST	Press 7'; Stengel 25' (Press), 29' (Gorry); Tymrak (yellow card) 90+1'; Jonsdottir (yellow card) 90+3'	Report	Lloyd 62' (Dorsey); Freeman (yellow card) 89'	Stadium: Rio Tinto Stadium; Attendance: 8,394

7 July 2018 14	Sky Blue FC	1–3	Chicago Red Stars	Piscataway, New Jersey
3:30 p.m. EST	Dorsey 73' (McCaskill)	Report	Kerr 40' (Mautz), 46' (Nagasato), 63' (Nagasato)	Stadium: Yurcak Field; Attendance: 2,846

14 July 2018 15	Sky Blue FC	0–4	North Carolina Courage	Piscataway, New Jersey
7:00 p.m. EST	Lloyd (yellow card) 85'	Report	Erceg 15' (Hamilton); Williams 56' (Hamilton), 72' (Debinha), 89'	Stadium: Yurcak Field; Attendance: 2,376

21 July 2018 16	Sky Blue FC	1–2	Portland Thorns FC	Piscataway, New Jersey
7:00 p.m. EST	Dorsey 27' (McCaskill)	Report	Raso 4' (Sinclair); Crnogorčević 7'; Christine Sinclair (yellow card) 80'	Stadium: Yurcak Field; Attendance: 2,338; Referee: Reyna Fonseca

28 July 2018	Chicago Red Stars	postponed	Sky Blue FC	Bridgeview, Illinois
8:00 p.m. EST				Stadium: Toyota Park
Note: Match postponed due to the cancellation of Sky Blue's flight to Chicago

5 August 2018 17	Orlando Pride	2–2	Sky Blue FC	Orlando, Florida
7:30 p.m. EST	Edmonds (yellow card) 32'; Marta 51'; Weatherholt 73'; Camila (yellow card) 78'; Kennedy (yellow card) 90+3'	Report	Dorsey 53' (Groom); Groom 59' (McCaskill); Lloyd (red card) 90+6'	Stadium: Orlando City Stadium; Attendance: 4,577

11 August 2018 18	Sky Blue FC	1–2	Houston Dash	Piscataway, New Jersey
7:00 p.m. EST	Tiernan 64'	Report	Daly 7' (Ohai), 73' (pen.)	Stadium: Yurcak Field; Attendance: 2,126

18 August 2018 19	Sky Blue FC	2–2	Utah Royals FC	Piscataway, New Jersey
7:00 p.m. EST	Johnson 14' (Rodriguez), 48'; Killion (yellow card) 39'; Lloyd (yellow card) 69'; Tiernan (yellow card) 76'	Report	Richardson 58' (o.g.); Rodriguez 90+4' (Press)	Stadium: Yurcak Field; Attendance: 3,468

22 August 2018 20	Portland Thorns FC	2–1	Sky Blue FC	Portland, Oregon
11:00 p.m. EST	Sinclair 13' (pen.); Heath 54'	Report	Tiernan (yellow card) 41'; McCaskill (yellow card) 67'; Johnson (yellow card) 75'; Killion 84'; Hoy (yellow card) 88'	Stadium: Providence Park; Attendance: 17,986; Referee: Mark Allatin

25 August 2018 21	Houston Dash	6–1	Sky Blue FC	Houston, Texas
8:30 p.m. EST	Motlhalo 22'; Latsko 48' (Huerta); Huerta 65' (Ohai); Daly 67' (pen.); Hanson 88' (Simon); Kgatlana 90' (Hanson)	Report	Dorsey 54'	Stadium: BBVA Compass Stadium; Attendance: 4,257

1 September 2018 22	Washington Spirit	1–1	Sky Blue FC	Boyds, Maryland
7:00 p.m. EST	Ship 71'	Report	Killion (yellow card) 58' (goal) 87' (Tiernan)	Stadium: Maryland SoccerPlex; Attendance: 3,461
Note: Game was postponed until Sunday, September 2 at 10 a.m. (ET) due to lightning.

4 September 2018 23	Chicago Red Stars	5–0	Sky Blue FC	Bridgeview, Illinois
7:30 p.m. EST	Mautz 18' (Gilliland), 46' (Gilliland); Kerr 64' (Elby); White 80' (Kerr); Vasconcelos 90+7' (White)	Report		Stadium: Toyota Park; Attendance: 2,974; Referee: Ismir Pekmic
Note: Match was originally scheduled for July 28th, was postponed due to the cancellation of Sky Blue's flight to Chicago.

8 September 2018 24	Sky Blue FC	1–0	Orlando Pride	Piscataway, New Jersey
12:00 p.m. EST	Sheridan (yellow card) 32'; Lloyd 73' (Groom)	Report		Stadium: Yurcak Field; Attendance: 4,086

=== League table ===
Pos	Team	Pld	W	D	L	GF	GA	GD	Pts	
1	North Carolina Courage (C)	24	17	6	1	53	17	+36	57	NWSL Shield
2	Portland Thorns FC	24	12	6	6	40	28	+12	42	NWSL Playoffs
3	Seattle Reign FC	24	11	8	5	27	19	+8	41	NWSL Playoffs
4	Chicago Red Stars	24	9	10	5	38	28	+10	37	NWSL Playoffs
5	Utah Royals FC	24	9	8	7	22	23	−1	35	
6	Houston Dash	24	9	5	10	35	39	−4	32	
7	Orlando Pride	24	8	6	10	30	37	−7	30	
8	Washington Spirit	24	2	5	17	12	35	−23	11	
9	Sky Blue FC	24	1	6	17	21	52	−31	9	

Source: NWSL
Rules for classification: Tiebreakers
(C) Champions

=== Results summary ===
Overall								Home						Away					
Pld	Pts	W	L	T	GF	GA	GD	W	L	T	GF	GA	GD	W	L	T	GF	GA	GD
24	9	1	17	6	21	52	−31	1	9	2	10	22	−12	0	8	4	11	30	−19

Last updated: September 8, 2018.
Source: NWSLsoccer.com

=== Results by round ===
Round	1	2	3	4	5	6	7	8	9	10	11	12	13	14	15	16	17	18	19	20	21	22	23	24
Stadium	A	H	A	H	A	H	A	H	H	H	A	A	A	H	H	H	A	A	H	H	A	A	A	H
Result	L	L	D	L	L	L	L	L	L	D	L	D	L	L	L	L	D	L	D	L	L	D	L	W
Position (Note: SBFC's position at the end of the matchweek, not their match.)	—	9	9	9	9	9	9	9	9	9	9	9	9	9	9	9	9	9	9	9	9	9	9	9

Updated to match(es) played on September 8, 2018. Source:
A = Away; H = Home; W = Win; D = Draw; L = Loss

== Honors and awards ==
=== NWSL Yearly Awards ===
==== NWSL Rookie of the Year ====
Player	Player Statistics	Ref.
(United States) Imani Dorsey	4 Goals; 1 Assist; 14 Appearances	

==== NWSL Team of the Year ====
Team	Position	Player	Ref.
Second XI	Midfielder	(United States) Carli Lloyd	

=== NWSL Weekly Awards ===
==== NWSL Player of the Week ====
Week	Result	Player	Ref
21	Won	(Mexico) Katie Johnson	

==== NWSL Save of the Week ====
Week	Result	Player(s)	Ref.
3	Nominated	(Canada) Kailen Sheridan	
9	Nominated	(Canada) Kailen Sheridan and (New Zealand) Rebekah Stott	
11/12	Nominated	(Canada) Kailen Sheridan	
19	Nominated	(Canada) Kailen Sheridan	
20	Nominated	(Canada) Kailen Sheridan	
21	Nominated	(Canada) Kailen Sheridan	
24	Nominated	(Canada) Kailen Sheridan	

==== NWSL Goal of the Week ====
Week	Result	Player	Ref.
4	Nominated	(United States) Savannah McCaskill	
7	Nominated	(United States) Savannah McCaskill	
8	Won	(United States) Carli Lloyd	
10	Nominated	(United States) Shea Groom	
11/12	Nominated	(United States) Savannah McCaskill	
24	Nominated	(United States) Carli Lloyd	

== Player transactions ==
=== 2018 NWSL College Draft ===
Source: National Women's Soccer League

Round	Pick	Nat.	Player	Pos.	Previous Team
Round 1	4	(United States)	Michaela Abam	F	University of West Virginia
Round 1	5	(United States)	Imani Dorsey	F	Duke University
Round 1	6	(Canada)	Amandine Pierre-Louis	D	University of West Virginia
Round 2	13	(United States)	Casey Murphy	GK	Rutgers University
Round 4	35	(Mexico)	Kiana Palacios	F	University of California, Irvine

=== In ===
Date	Player	Positions played	Previous club	Fee/notes	Ref.
December 13, 2017	(Brazil) Thaisa	MF	(Iceland) Grindavík	Signed in offseason	
December 29, 2017	(United States) Christina Gibbons	DF	(United States) Utah Royals FC	Acquired in trade for Kelley O'Hara, Taylor Lytle, and Utah's 4th overall pick in the 2018 NWSL College Draft.	
December 29, 2017	(United States) Shea Groom	FW	(United States) Utah Royals FC	Acquired in trade for Kelley O'Hara, Taylor Lytle, and Utah's 4th overall pick in the 2018 NWSL College Draft.	
January 11, 2018	(Mexico) Katie Johnson	FW	(United States) Seattle Reign	Acquired in trade for the rights to Caitlin Foord	
January 11, 2018	(New Zealand) Rebekah Stott	FW	(United States) Seattle Reign	Acquired in trade for the rights to Caitlin Foord	
January 19, 2018	(United States) Carli Lloyd	MF	(United States) Houston Dash	Acquired as part of a three team trade that also included Janine Beckie, Christen Press, Sam Kerr, Nikki Stanton and Jen Hoy. Draft picks and international roster spot were also part of trade.	
January 19, 2018	(Canada) Janine Beckie	FW	(United States) Houston Dash	Acquired as part of a three team trade that also included Carli Lloyd, Christen Press, Sam Kerr, Nikki Stanton and Jen Hoy. Draft picks and international roster spot were also part of trade.	
January 19, 2018	(United States) Jen Hoy	FW	(United States) Chicago Red Stars	Acquired as part of a three team trade that also included Carli Lloyd, Christen Press, Sam Kerr, Nikki Stanton and Janine Beckie. Draft picks and international roster spot were also part of trade.	
January 30, 2018	(United States) Savannah McCaskill	FW	(United States) Boston Breakers	Acquired during Boston Breakers Dispersal Draft	
January 30, 2018	(Canada) Adriana Leon	FW	(United States) Boston Breakers	Acquired during Boston Breakers Dispersal Draft	
January 30, 2018	(United States) Amanda Frisbie	FW	(United States) Boston Breakers	Acquired during Boston Breakers Dispersal Draft	

=== Out ===
Date	Player	Positions played	Destination club	Fee/notes	Ref.
December 29, 2017	(United States) Kelley O'Hara	DF	(United States) Utah Royals FC	Traded to Utah Royals FC along with Taylor Lytle for Katie Johnson, Christina Gibbons, and Utah's 4th overall pick in the 2018 NWSL College Draft.	
December 29, 2017	(United States) Taylor Lytle	MF	(United States) Utah Royals FC	Traded to Utah Royals FC along with Kelley O'Hara for Katie Johnson, Christina Gibbons, and Utah's 4th overall pick in the 2018 NWSL College Draft.	
January 19, 2018	(Australia) Samantha Kerr	FW	(United States) Chicago Red Stars	Traded to the Chicago Red Stars as part of a three team trade that also included Janine Beckie, Christen Press, Carli Lloyd, Nikki Stanton and Jen Hoy. Draft picks and international roster spot were also part of trade.	
January 19, 2018	(United States) Nikki Stanton	MF	(United States) Chicago Red Stars	Traded to the Chicago Red Stars as part of a three team trade that also included Janine Beckie, Christen Press, Carli Lloyd, Sam Kerr and Jen Hoy. Draft picks and international roster spot were also part of trade.	
May 4, 2018	(United States) Erin Simon	DF		Waived.	
June 12, 2018	(Canada) Adriana Leon	MF	(United States) Seattle Reign	Traded to the Seattle Reign for Seattle's 4th Round pick in the 2019 NWSL College Draft	
June 15, 2018	(United States) Kayla Mills	DF		Waived.	
July 25, 2018	(United States) Michaela Abam	FW	(France) Paris FC	Waived. Signed with Paris FC in the Division 1 Féminine.	
July 25, 2018	(Brazil) Thaisa	MF	(Italy) A.C. Milan	Waived. Signed with A.C. Milan in the Serie A.	
August 9, 2018	(Canada) Janine Beckie	FW	(England) Manchester City	Transferred to Manchester City in the FA Women's Super League	

== See also ==
- 2018 National Women's Soccer League season
- 2018 in American soccer
