= 2016 Sky Blue FC season =

Sky Blue FC
2016 season
- President & CEO: Thomas Hofstetter
- Head coach: Christy Holly
- Stadium: Yurcak Field
- NWSL: 7th
- Top goalscorer: Sam Kerr (5)
- Highest home attendance: 3,780 (Sep 25 vs. Portland)
- Lowest home attendance: 1,252 (May 7 vs. Western New York)
- Average home league attendance: 2,162
Home colors	Away colors

The 2016 Sky Blue FC season was the team's seventh season. Sky Blue played the 2016 season in National Women's Soccer League, the top tier of women's soccer in the United States.

== Team ==
=== Roster ===
The first team roster of Sky Blue FC.

=== Current squad ===
Note: Flags indicate national team as defined under FIFA eligibility rules; some limited exceptions apply. Players may hold more than one non-FIFA nationality.

No.	Pos.	Nation	Player
2	MF	USA	Shawna Gordon
3	DF	USA	Christie Rampone
5	DF	USA	Maya Hayes
6	MF	USA	Taylor Lytle
7	MF	USA	Nikki Stanton
8	MF	USA	Ashley Nick
10	MF	USA	Erica Skroski
11	MF	CRC	Raquel Rodriguez
12	MF	USA	Kim DeCesare
13	DF	USA	Kristin Grubka
15	DF	USA	CoCo Goodson

No.	Pos.	Nation	Player
16	MF	USA	Sarah Killion
18	GK	USA	Caroline Stanley
19	DF	USA	Kelley O'Hara
20	FW	AUS	Samantha Kerr
21	FW	ENG	Leah Galton
22	DF	USA	Rachel Breton
24	MF	USA	Kelly Conheeney
27	GK	USA	Caroline Casey
32	FW	USA	Natasha Kai
33	FW	USA	Erin Simon
44	MF	USA	Theresa Diederich

== Match results ==
=== Preseason ===
March 20 preseason	Sky Blue FC	1–0	St. John's Red Storm	Scotch Plains, New Jersey
2:00pm ET	Killion 37' (pen.)	(Note: "SKY BLUE FC EARNS VICTORY IN 2016 PRESEASON OPENER". skybluefc.com.)		Stadium: Wexler Field

March 26 preseason	Sky Blue FC	2–0	North Carolina Tar Heels	Lakewood Township, New Jersey
2:00pm ET	Kai 4'; DeCesare 61'			Stadium: Georgian Court University

=== Regular season ===
April 17 1	Seattle Reign FC	1–2	Sky Blue FC	Seattle, Washington
	Merritt Mathias 52' (Jessica Fishlock); Hope Solo (yellow card) 37'; Rachel Corsie (yellow card) 81'		Tasha Kai 15' (Kelley O'Hara); Kelly Conheeney 67' (Taylor Lytle)	Stadium: Memorial Stadium; Attendance: 3,987; Referee: Karen Abt

April 24 2	Sky Blue FC	1–2	Washington Spirit	Piscataway, New Jersey
	Maya Hayes 66' (Taylor Lytle); Kelley O'Hara (yellow card) 74'		Ali Krieger 40' (Tori Huster); Shelina Zadorsky (yellow card) 46+'; Diana Matheson 56' (Crystal Dunn)	Stadium: Yurcak Field; Attendance: 2,571

April 29 3	Houston Dash	0–0	Sky Blue FC	Houston
			Raquel Rodriguez (yellow card) 32'	Stadium: BBVA Compass Stadium; Attendance: 5,081; Referee: Reyna Fonseca

May 7 4	Sky Blue FC	1–2	Western New York Flash	Piscataway, New Jersey
	Maya Hayes 35' (Raquel Rodriguez); Nikki Stanton (yellow card) 41'; Caroline Stanley (yellow card) 71'		Abby Dahlkemper (yellow card) 4'; Jaelene Hinkle 71' (penalty); Samantha Mewis 86' (unassisted); Kristen Hamilton (yellow card) 90+3'	Stadium: Yurcak Field; Attendance: 1,252; Referee: Ekaterina Koroleva

May 13 5	Sky Blue FC	1–0	Boston Breakers	Piscataway, New Jersey
	Own Goal (Kassey Kallman) 41'	(Note: "Resilient Sky Blue FC Side Earns Three Home Points Over Boston Breakers". skybluefc.com.)		Stadium: Yurcak Field; Attendance: 1,275; Referee: Guido Gonzeles, Jr.

May 21 6	Western New York Flash	5–2	Sky Blue FC	Rochester, New York
				Stadium: Sahlen's Stadium; Attendance: 3,910; Referee: Farhad Dadkho

May 29 7	Chicago Red Stars	1–1	Sky Blue FC	Bridgeview, Illinois
	Sofia Huerta 34' (Jen Hoy)		Leah Galton 69' (Taylor Lytle) (yellow card) 57'	Stadium: Toyota Park; Attendance: 2,502; Referee: Matthew Franz

June 11 8	Sky Blue FC	1–1	FC Kansas City	Piscataway, New Jersey
	Sarah Killion 30' (pen.)		Shea Groom 27' (Erika Tymrak)	Stadium: Yurcak Field; Attendance: 2,754; Referee: Karen Abt

June 19 9	Sky Blue FC	0–0	Seattle Reign FC	Piscataway, New Jersey
6:00 p.m. EDT				Stadium: Yurcak Field; Attendance: 1,547; Referee: Margaret Domka

June 25 10	Washington Spirit	1–2	Sky Blue FC	Boyds, Maryland
	Diana Matheson 77' (Estefania Banini)		Raquel Rodriguez 8' (Leah Galton); Samantha Kerr 64' (Leah Galton)	Stadium: Maryland SoccerPlex; Attendance: 3,448; Referee: Leszek Stalmach

July 2 11	Portland Thorns FC	2–1	Sky Blue FC	Portland, Oregon
	Dagny Brynjarsdottir 38'; Nadia Nadim 62' (pen.)		Tasha Kai 30'	Stadium: Providence Park; Attendance: 14,287; Referee: Reyna Fonseca

July 9 12	Sky Blue FC	1–0	Houston Dash	Piscataway, New Jersey
	Taylor Lytle 54'			Stadium: Yurcak Field; Attendance: 1,732; Referee: Cuauhtemoc Delgadillo

July 17 13	Boston Breakers	2–3	Sky Blue FC	Boston, Massachusetts
	Angela Salem 3'; Julie King 85'		Sarah Killion 28' (pen.); Leah Galton 37'; Erica Skroski 74'	Stadium: Jordan Field; Attendance: 3,314; Referee: Matthew Franz

July 23 14	Sky Blue FC	1–0	Washington Spirit	Piscataway, New Jersey
	Leah Galton 24'			Stadium: Yurcak Field; Attendance: 1,552; Referee: Matthew Kreitzer

July 30 15	Washington Spirit	3–1	Sky Blue FC	Boyds, Maryland
				Stadium: Maryland SoccerPlex; Attendance: 2,930; Referee: Victor Rivas

August 27 16	Sky Blue FC	1–3	Chicago Red Stars	Piscataway, New Jersey
	Samantha Kerr 92+' (Leah Galton)		Stephanie McCaffrey 31' (unassisted); Christen Press 73' (Vanessa DiBernardo); Sofia Huerta 80' (Arin Gilliland); Alyssa Mautz (yellow card) 92+'	Stadium: Yurcak Field; Attendance: 3,108; Referee: Danielle Brzezinski-Chesky

September 4 17	FC Kansas City	2–1	Sky Blue FC	Kansas City, Missouri
	Tiffany McCarty 46+' (unassisted); Yael Averbuch 85' (unassisted)		Samantha Kerr 40' (Leah Galton)	Stadium: Swope Soccer Village; Attendance: 2,414; Referee: Victor Rivas

September 7 18	Sky Blue FC	1–1	Orlando Pride	Piscataway, New Jersey
	Sam Kerr 80'; Nikki Stanton (yellow card) 90+'		Alex Morgan 23' (Maddy Evans)	Stadium: Yurcak Field; Attendance: 2,055; Referee: Matthew Franz

September 10 19	Orlando Pride	1–2	Sky Blue FC	Orlando, Florida
	Kristen Edmonds 42' (unassisted); Toni Pressley (yellow card) 70'		Sam Kerr 48' (unassisted); Christie Rampone (yellow card) 49'; Maya Hayes 53' (unassisted)	Stadium: Camping World Stadium; Attendance: 6,788; Referee: Danielle Chesky

September 25 20	Sky Blue FC	1–3	Portland Thorns FC	Piscataway, New Jersey
	Natasha Kai 6' (kelley O'Hara); Kristin Grubka (yellow card) 59'	Report	Allie Long 41' (Tobin Heath); Lindsey Horan 57' (Nadia Nadim); Allie Long 84' (Hayley Raso)	Stadium: Yurcak Field; Attendance: 3,780; Referee: Christina Unkel

=== Standings ===
Pos	Team	Pld	W	D	L	GF	GA	GD	Pts	Qualification
1	Portland Thorns FC	20	12	5	3	35	19	+16	41	NWSL Shield
2	Washington Spirit	20	12	3	5	30	21	+9	39	NWSL Playoffs
3	Chicago Red Stars	20	9	6	5	24	20	+4	33	NWSL Playoffs
4	Western New York Flash (C)	20	9	5	6	40	26	+14	32	NWSL Playoffs
5	Seattle Reign FC	20	8	6	6	29	21	+8	30	
6	FC Kansas City	20	7	5	8	18	20	−2	26	
7	Sky Blue FC	20	7	5	8	24	30	−6	26	
8	Houston Dash	20	6	4	10	29	29	0	22	
9	Orlando Pride	20	6	1	13	20	30	−10	19	
10	Boston Breakers	20	3	2	15	14	47	−33	11	

Source: NWSL
Rules for classification: Tiebreakers
(C) Champions

Results summary

Overall								Home						Away					
Pld	W	D	L	GF	GA	GD	Pts	W	D	L	GF	GA	GD	W	D	L	GF	GA	GD
20	7	5	8	24	30	−6	26	2	3	3	9	12	−3	5	2	5	15	18	−3

Last updated: September 25, 2016.
Source: Soccerway

Results by round

Round	1	2	3	4	5	6	7	8	9	10	11	12	13	14	15	16	17	18	19	20
Stadium	A	H	A	H	H	A	A	H	H	A	A	H	A	H	A	H	A	H	A	H
Result	W	L	D	L	W	L	D	D	D	W	L	W	W	W	L	L	L	D	W	L
Position	2	6	6	8	5	8	6	7	7	6	7	6	5	4	5	5	6	6	6	7

Updated to match(es) played on September 25, 2016. Source: nwslsoccer.com
A = Away; H = Home; W = Win; D = Draw; L = Loss

== Squad statistics ==
Source: NWSL

N	Pos	Player	GP	GS	Min	G	A	PK	Shot	SOG	SOG%	Cro	CK	Off	Foul	FS	YC	RC
27	GK	Caroline Casey	10	9	860	0	0	0	0	0	—	0	0	0	0	1	0	0
24	MF	Kelly Conheeney	13	6	590	1	0	0	11	6	55%	1	2	4	12	7	1	0
12	MF	Kim DeCesare	6	3	242	0	0	0	3	1	33%	0	0	1	2	2	0	0
21	FW	Leah Galton	14	10	1021	3	4	0	19	8	42%	5	10	9	10	8	1	0
2	MF	Shawna Gordon	10	5	427	0	0	0	3	1	33%	0	2	3	0	1	0	0
13	DF	Kristin Grubka	15	14	1267	0	1	0	3	2	67%	0	0	2	15	6	2	0
4	FW	Maya Hayes	16	8	765	3	0	0	13	7	54%	0	3	3	7	8	0	0
32	FW	Tasha Kai	20	17	1410	4	1	0	38	22	58%	1	1	25	13	19	3	0
20	FW	Samantha Kerr	9	6	616	5	0	0	27	15	56%	0	1	5	5	5	0	0
16	MF	Sarah Killion	18	18	1620	3	1	3	13	7	54%	0	22	0	17	25	0	0
6	MF	Taylor Lytle	18	18	1506	1	4	0	12	2	17%	1	0	4	3	3	0	0
8	MF	Ashley Nick	3	1	103	0	0	0	0	0	—	0	0	0	1	0	0	0
19	DF	Kelley O'Hara	12	11	1033	1	2	0	25	8	32%	0	33	7	10	15	1	0
3	DF	Christie Rampone	20	20	1800	0	0	0	1	0	0%	0	0	2	7	10	1	0
26	DF	Domi Richardson	2	0	54	0	0	0	2	1	50%	0	0	0	2	0	0	0
11	MF	Raquel Rodriguez	18	17	1461	1	1	0	22	10	45%	1	0	0	18	26	1	0
88	MF	Danielle Schulmann	3	0	42	0	0	0	1	1	100%	0	0	0	0	3	0	0
33	DF	Erin Simon	19	18	1590	0	2	0	1	0	0%	0	0	4	17	16	1	0
10	MF	Erica Skroski	20	20	1784	1	0	0	4	3	75%	1	0	0	6	4	0	0
18	GK	Caroline Stanley	11	11	940	0	0	0	0	0	—	0	0	0	0	1	1	0
7	MF	Nikki Stanton	12	4	412	0	0	0	2	1	50%	0	0	0	10	1	3	0
29	FW	Catherine Zimmerman	5	4	257	0	0	0	1	0	0%	0	0	0	5	7	0	0
Team Total			20	—	19800	23	16	3	201	95	47%	10	74	69	160	168	15	0

N	Pos	Goal keeper	GP	GS	Min	GA	GA/G	PKA	PKF	Shot	SOG	Sav	Sav%	YC	RC
27	GL	Caroline Casey	10	9	860	14	1.40	1	1	122	46	32	70%	0	0
18	GK	Caroline Stanley	11	11	940	16	1.45	1	1	125	49	33	67%	1	0
Team Total			20	—	1800	30	1.50	2	2	247	95	65	68%	1	0

== Honors and awards ==
=== NWSL Awards ===
==== NWSL Yearly Awards ====
Player	Award	Ref.
(Costa Rica) Raquel Rodríguez	Rookie of the Year	
(United States) Christie Rampone	Second X1	

==== NWSL Player of the Week ====
Week	Result	Player	Ref.
18	Won	(Australia) Sam Kerr	

== See also ==
- 2016 National Women's Soccer League season
- 2016 in American soccer
