= Erica Skroski =

American soccer player

Personal information
- Full name: Erica Marie Skroski
- Date of birth: February 14, 1994 (age 32)
- Place of birth: Galloway Township, New Jersey, United States
- Height: 5 ft 6 in (1.68 m)
- Position: Defender

College career
Years	Team	Apps	(Gls)
2012–2015	Rutgers Scarlet Knights	88	(5)

Senior career*
Years	Team	Apps	(Gls)
2016–2021	NJ/NY Gotham FC (Note: Sky Blue FC changed its name to NJ/NY Gotham FC in 2021)	96	(2)

International career
2016–2017	United States U23		
- * Club domestic league appearances and goals

Erica Marie Skroski (born February 14, 1994) is an American retired soccer player who played as a defender.

== Early life ==
A native of Galloway Township, New Jersey, Skroski played soccer at Absegami High School. In 2011, she was named to the All-South Jersey Girls' Soccer First Team, and was named The Press of Atlantic City Girls Soccer Player of the Year.

She played club youth soccer for NJSA under coach Kris Anderson.

=== College ===
From 2012 to 2015, Skroski played college soccer at Rutgers University, where she majored in exercise science and sport studies. She was selected to the 2012–13 Big East All-Academic Team, and was selected to the Academic All-Big Ten team in 2014 and 2015. For the 2014 season, she was selected to the All-Big Ten Second Team, and the 2014 Big Ten All-Tournament Team. In 2015, Skroski was named Big Ten Defender of the Year and was a First Team All-Big Ten selection. She was also a NSCAA Second Team All-American.

In the 2015 NCAA Division I women's soccer tournament, Rutgers reached the college cup for the first time in school history. Rutgers had built around defense, and Skroski and Brianne Reed anchored the back line for the team. In the quarterfinal, Rutgers held the No. 1 seed Virginia, the highest scoring team in the country, to a 0–0 draw, then advanced by defeating Virginia 7–6 in a penalty shoot-out. For the season, Rutgers set school records with 19 wins and 19 shutouts; their season ended with a loss to Penn State in the semi-final.

== Professional career ==
Skroski was drafted by Sky Blue FC in the 3rd round of the 2016 NWSL College Draft. As a rookie, she played in all 20 games, playing all but six minutes during the 2016 NWSL season. She scored her first professional goal against the Boston Breakers on July 17, 2016. In October 2016, Sky Blue FC exercised Skroski's 2017 option.

Skroski played in 21 games with 20 starts during the 2017 NWSL season. She scored her first goal of the season on September 30 against Boston. After the 2017 season, Sky Blue FC extended a new contract offer to Skroski.

She made the Sky Blue FC opening-day roster for the 2018 NWSL season.

She was out of contract in December 2021.

== International career ==
She was called up to the United States national under-23 team in January 2016 for a friendly against the Republic of Ireland. She was then called up to the United States under-23 team for the 2016 Istria Cup in March.

In January 2017, Skroski was called into a U.S. under-23 team training camp; she was one of four NWSL players named to the roster. She was named to the U.S. U-23 team rosters for the 2017 La Manga Tournament in March and the 2017 Nordic Tournament in June.

== Career statistics ==
=== College ===
Club	Season	Apps	Goals
Rutgers	2012	20	0
Rutgers	2013	22	3
Rutgers	2014	20	0
Rutgers	2015	26	2
Career totals		88	5

=== Club ===
Club	Season	League			Cup (Note: Includes the NWSL Challenge Cup)		Playoffs (Note: Includes NWSL Playoffs)		Other		Total	
Club	Season	Division	Apps	Goals	Apps	Goals	Apps	Goals	Apps	Goals	Apps	Goals
NJ/NY Gotham FC	2016	NWSL	20	1	—		—		—		20	1
NJ/NY Gotham FC	2017	NWSL	21	1	—		—		—		21	1
NJ/NY Gotham FC	2018	NWSL	20	0	—		—		—		20	0
NJ/NY Gotham FC	2019	NWSL	24	0	—		—		—		24	0
NJ/NY Gotham FC	2020	NWSL	—		5	0	—		4 (Note: Includes the NWSL Fall Series)	0	9	0
NJ/NY Gotham FC	2021	NWSL	11	0	1	0	0	0	—		12	0
Career total			96	2	6	0	0	0	4	0	106	2

== Honors ==
Individual

- Big Ten Conference Defender of the Year: 2015
