= 2016 NWSL College Draft =

Soccer draft

General information
- Sport: Soccer
- Date: January 15, 2016
- Time: 10:00 AM ET
- Location: Baltimore Convention Center, Baltimore, Maryland

Overview
- 40 total selections in 4 rounds
- First selection: Emily Sonnett, Portland Thorns FC
- Most selections: Chicago Red Stars (7 picks)
- Fewest selections: Portland Thorns FC (2 picks)

The 2016 NWSL College Draft was the fourth annual meeting of National Women's Soccer League (NWSL) franchises to select eligible college players. It was held on January 15, 2016, at the National Soccer Coaches Association of America Convention in Baltimore, Maryland.

== Format ==
- Draft order was determined by the final 2015 regular season standings.

== Results ==
=== Key ===
^{+}	Denotes player who has been selected as NWSL Most Valuable Player
^{*}	Denotes player who has been selected for an NWSL Best XI or NWSL Second XI team
^{^}	Denotes player who has been selected as NWSL Rookie of the Year
^{#}	Denotes player who has never appeared in an NWSL regular season, playoff, or Challenge Cup game

=== Picks ===
Round	Pick	Nat.	Player	Pos.	NWSL team	Notes	College
Round 1	1	(United States)	Emily Sonnett^{*}	D	Portland Thorns FC	(Note: Orlando Pride → Portland Thorns. October 26, 2015: Portland Thorns FC acquired the No. 1 overall pick in the 2016 NWSL College Draft, the first pick in the 2015 Expansion Draft and an international roster spot for the 2016 and 2017 seasons from the Orlando Pride in exchange for forward Alex Morgan and midfielder Kaylyn Kyle.)	Virginia
Round 1	2	(Costa Rica)	Raquel Rodríguez^{^}	F	Sky Blue FC	(Note: Boston Breakers → Portland Thorns → Sky Blue FC. October 26, 2015: Boston Breakers acquired midfielders McCall Zerboni and Sinead Farrelly from Portland Thorns FC in exchange for their first-round (No. 2 overall) and second-round (No. 20 overall) picks in the 2016 National Women's Soccer League College Draft. January 15, 2016: Sky Blue FC acquired the second overall pick in the 2016 draft as well as a first-round and conditional fourth-round pick in the 2017 draft from Portland Thorns FC in exchange for the rights to Nadia Nadim, the third overall pick in the 2016 draft, and a second-round pick in the 2017 draft.)	Penn State
Round 1	3	(United States)	Christen Westphal	D	Boston Breakers	(Note: Sky Blue FC → Portland Thorns → Boston Breakers. January 15, 2016: Sky Blue FC acquired the second overall pick in the 2016 draft as well as a first-round and conditional fourth-round pick in the 2017 draft from Portland Thorns FC in exchange for the rights to Nadia Nadim, the third overall pick in the 2016 draft, and a second-round pick in the 2017 draft. January 15, 2016: Boston Breakers acquired the third overall pick in the 2016 draft, the fourth spot in the Allocation Ranking Order, and future considerations from Portland Thorns FC in exchange for the first overall spot in the Allocation Ranking Order.)	Florida
Round 1	4	(United States)	Carson Pickett *	D	Seattle Reign FC	(Note: Western New York Flash → Seattle Reign FC. March 30, 2015: Seattle Reign FC acquired Amber Brooks, the rights to Abby Wambach, and a first round draft pick in the 2016 NWSL College Draft from Western New York Flash in exchange for Sydney Leroux and Amanda Frisbie.)	Florida State
Round 1	5	(United States)	Cari Roccaro	D	Houston Dash	(Note: Portland Thorns FC → Seattle Reign FC → Houston Dash. August 6, 2015: Portland Thorns FC acquired Lianne Sanderson and a first round pick and 3rd round pick in the 2016 NWSL College Draft from Seattle Reign FC in exchange for Portland's first round pick in the 2016 NWSL College Draft. October 21, 2015: Seattle Reign FC acquired Meghan Klingenberg from the Houston Dash in exchange for Amber Brooks and the 5th overall pick in the 2016 NWSL College Draft.)	Notre Dame
Round 1	6	(England)	Rachel Daly^{*}	F	Houston Dash		St. John's
Round 1	7	(Jamaica)	Cheyna Williams	F	Washington Spirit		Florida State
Round 1	8	(Canada)	Janine Beckie	F	Houston Dash	(Note: FC Kansas City → Houston Dash. January 13, 2016: Houston Dash acquired FC Kansas City's 1st Round Pick in the 2016 NWSL College Draft and an international slot in exchange for Tiffany McCarty and Jessica McDonald.)	Texas Tech
Round 1	9	(United States)	Michaela Hahn	M	Western New York Flash	(Note: Chicago Red Stars → Western New York Flash. November 10, 2015: Western New York Flash acquired Adriana Leon, Abby Erceg, and the 9th overall pick in the 2016 NWSL College Draft from the Chicago Red Stars in exchange for Whitney Engen and a 4th round pick in the 2017 NWSL College Draft.)	Florida State
Round 1	10	(United States)	Sam Witteman	D	Orlando Pride	(Note: Seattle Reign FC → Portland Thorns FC → Orlando Pride. August 6, 2015: Portland Thorns FC acquired Lianne Sanderson and a first round pick in the 2016 NWSL College Draft from Seattle Reign FC in exchange for Portland's first round pick and 3rd round pick in the 2016 NWSL College Draft. January 13, 2016: Portland Thorns FC acquired the rights to Lindsey Horan from the Orlando Pride in exchange for the 10th overall pick in the 2016 NWSL College Draft.)	California
Round 2	11	(United States)	Makenzy Doniak	F	Western New York Flash	(Note: Orlando Pride → Western New York Flash. December 17, 2015: Western New York Flash acquired Orlando's 2nd round pick (11th overall) in the 2016 NWSL College Draft and Orlando's 1st round pick in the 2017 NWSL College Draft in exchange for Becky Edwards and the rights to Kristen Edmonds.)	Virginia
Round 2	12	(United States)	Cali Farquharson	F	Washington Spirit	(Note: Boston Breakers → Washington Spirit. November 19, 2015: Boston Breakers sent the 12th pick and the 20th pick in the 2016 NWSL College Draft to the Washington Spirit in exchange for Angela Salem.)	Arizona State
Round 2	13	(England)	Leah Galton	F	Sky Blue FC		Hofstra
Round 2	14	(United States)	Mallory Weber	F	Western New York Flash		Penn State
Round 2	15	(Mexico)	Christina Burkenroad	F	Orlando Pride	(Note: Portland Thorns FC → Washington Spirit → FC Kansas City → Orlando Pride. January 16, 2015: Portland Thorns FC acquire Jodie Taylor from the Washington Spirit in exchange for the 13th overall pick in the 2015 NWSL College Draft and two second round picks (one from the Houston Dash) in the 2016 NWSL College Draft. January 16, 2015: FC Kansas City acquired two second round picks in the 2016 NWSL College Draft from the Washington Spirit in exchange for the 19th overall pick in the 2015 NWSL College Draft. October 26, 2015: Orlando Pride acquired Sarah Hagen and the 15th overall pick in the 2016 NWSL College Draft from FC Kansas City in exchange for their 2nd round pick in the 2017 NWSL College Draft.)	Cal State Fullerton
Round 2	16	(New Zealand)	Katie Bowen	D	FC Kansas City	(Note: Houston Dash → Portland Thorns FC → Washington Spirit → FC Kansas City. January 16, 2015: Houston Dash acquired a player to be named later from Portland Thorns FC in exchange for the 13th overall pick in the 2015 NWSL College Draft and Houston's 2nd round pick in the 2016 NWSL College Draft. January 16, 2015: Portland Thorns FC acquire Jodie Taylor from the Washington Spirit in exchange for the 13th overall pick in the 2015 NWSL College Draft and two second round picks (one from the Houston Dash) in the 2016 NWSL College Draft. January 16, 2015: FC Kansas City acquired two second round picks in the 2016 NWSL College Draft from the Washington Spirit in exchange for the 19th overall pick in the 2015 NWSL College Draft.)	North Carolina
Round 2	17	(United States)	Brittany Ratcliffe	M	Boston Breakers	(Note: Washington Spirit → Chicago Red Stars → Boston Breakers. June 17, 2015: Washington Spirit acquired an international slot for the remainder of the 2015 season and the 2016 season from the Chicago Red Stars in exchange for Washington's 2nd and 3rd round picks in the 2016 NWSL College Draft. November 23, 2015: Boston Breakers acquired Whitney Engen, the 17th overall pick in the 2016 NWSL College Draft, and a 2nd round pick in the 2017 NWSL College Draft from the Chicago Red Stars in exchange for Alyssa Naeher and the 22nd overall pick in the 2016 NWSL College Draft.)	Virginia
Round 2	18	(Dominican Republic)	Brianne Reed	D	FC Kansas City		Rutgers
Round 2	19	(United States)	Katie Naughton	D	Chicago Red Stars		Notre Dame
Round 2	20	(Republic of Ireland)	Alli Murphy	M	Washington Spirit	(Note: Seattle Reign FC → Boston Breakers → Portland Thorns FC → Boston Breakers → Washington Spirit. August 6, 2015: Boston Breakers acquired a 2nd round pick in the 2016 NWSL College Draft from Seattle Reign FC in exchange for the rights to Lianne Sanderson October 26, 2015: Portland Thorns acquired the 2nd overall and 20th overall pick in the 2016 NWSL College Draft from the Boston Breakers in exchange for Sinead Farrelly and McCall Zerboni. October 26, 2015: Boston Breakers acquired the 20th overall pick and the 35th overall pick in the 2016 NWSL College Draft from Portland Thorns FC in exchange for Dagný Brynjarsdóttir. November 19, 2015: Boston Breakers sent the 12th pick and the 20th pick in the 2016 NWSL College Draft to the Washington Spirit in exchange for Angela Salem.)	Texas Tech
Round 3	21	(United States)	McKenzie Berryhill	D	Portland Thorns FC	(Note: Orlando Pride → Portland Thorns FC. December 10, 2015: Portland Thorns FC acquired Adrianna Franch and the 21st overall pick from the Orlando Pride in exchange for Steph Catley.)	Arizona State
Round 3	22	(United States)	Sarah Gorden *	D	Chicago Red Stars	(Note: Boston Breakers → Chicago Red Stars. November 23, 2015: Boston Breakers acquired Whitney Engen, the 17th overall pick in the 2016 NWSL College Draft, and a 2nd round pick in the 2017 NWSL College Draft from the Chicago Red Stars in exchange for Alyssa Naeher and the 22nd overall pick in the 2016 NWSL College Draft.)	DePaul
Round 3	23	(United States)	Erica Skroski	D	Sky Blue FC		Rutgers
Round 3	24	(United States)	Laura Liedle^{#}	D	Western New York Flash		Stanford
Round 3	25	(United States)	Paige Nielsen	M	Seattle Reign FC	(Note: Portland Thorns FC → Seattle Reign FC. August 6, 2015: Portland Thorns FC acquired Lianne Sanderson and a first round pick in the 2016 NWSL College Draft from Seattle Reign FC in exchange for Portland's first round pick and 3rd round pick in the 2016 NWSL College Draft.)	North Carolina
Round 3	26	(United States)	Britt Eckerstrom	G	Western New York Flash	(Note: Houston Dash → Western New York Flash. October 16, 2014: Houston Dash acquired Carli Lloyd from the Western New York Flash in exchange for Becky Edwards, Whitney Engen, and a 3rd round pick in the 2016 NWSL College Draft.)	Penn State
Round 3	27	(United States)	Abby Smith	G	Boston Breakers	(Note: Washington Spirit → Chicago Red Stars → Boston Breakers. June 17, 2015: Washington Spirit acquired an international slot for the remainder of the 2015 season and the 2016 season from the Chicago Red Stars in exchange for Washington's 2nd and 3rd round picks in the 2016 NWSL College Draft. January 15, 2016: Boston Breakers traded 2016 thirty-second and thirty-fifth overall picks to Chicago Red Stars in exchange for 2016 twenty-seventh overall pick.)	Texas
Round 3	28	(United States)	Alexa Newfield	F	FC Kansas City		North Carolina
Round 3	29	(United States)	Caroline Casey	G	Sky Blue FC	(Note: Chicago Red Stars → Sky Blue FC. January 15, 2016: Sky Blue FC traded 2016 thirty-third and thirty-sixth overall picks to Chicago Red Stars in exchange for 2016 twenty-ninth overall pick.)	William & Mary
Round 3	30	(United States)	Summer Green	F	Seattle Reign FC		North Carolina
Round 4	31	(United States)	Dani Weatherholt	M	Orlando Pride		Santa Clara
Round 4	32	(United States)	Courtney Raetzman	M	Chicago Red Stars	(Note: Boston Breakers → Chicago Red Stars. January 15, 2016: Boston Breakers traded 2016 thirty-second and thirty-fifth overall picks to Chicago Red Stars in exchange for 2016 twenty-seventh overall pick.)	Kentucky
Round 4	33	(United States)	Jannelle Flaws	F	Chicago Red Stars	(Note: Sky Blue FC → Chicago Red Stars. January 15, 2016: Sky Blue FC traded 2016 thirty-third and thirty-sixth overall picks to Chicago Red Stars in exchange for 2016 twenty-ninth overall pick.)	Illinois
Round 4	34	(United States)	Madalyn Schiffel	G	Washington Spirit	(Note: Western New York Flash → Washington Spirit. November 13, 2014: Western New York Flash sent Kelsey Wys and their 4th round pick 10th pick to the Washington Spirit in exchange for Chantel Jones.)	San Francisco
Round 4	35	(United States)	Adrienne Jordan	D	Chicago Red Stars	(Note: Portland Thorns FC → Boston Breakers → Chicago Red Stars. October 26, 2015: Boston Breakers acquired the 20th overall pick and the 35th overall pick in the 2016 NWSL College Draft from Portland Thorns FC in exchange for Dagný Brynjarsdóttir. January 15, 2016: Boston Breakers traded 2016 thirty-second and thirty-fifth overall picks to Chicago Red Stars in exchange for 2016 twenty-seventh overall pick.)	Northern Colorado
Round 4	36	(Panama)	Candace Johnson^{#}	D	Chicago Red Stars	(Note: Houston Dash → Sky Blue FC → Chicago Red Stars. November 25, 2015: Houston Dash acquired the rights to Chioma Ubogagu from Sky Blue FC in exchange for the 36th overall pick in the 2016 NWSL College Draft and a 3rd round pick in the 2017 NWSL College Draft. January 15, 2016: Sky Blue FC traded 2016 thirty-third and thirty-sixth overall picks to Chicago Red Stars in exchange for 2016 twenty-ninth overall pick.)	Missouri
Round 4	37	(United States)	Kara Marie Wilson^{#}	D	Washington Spirit		Duke
Round 4	38	(United States)	Alex Arlitt	D	FC Kansas City		LSU
Round 4	39	(United States)	Ashleigh Ellenwood^{#}	F	Chicago Red Stars		Arkansas
Round 4	40	(United States)	Lindsey Luke^{#}	G	Seattle Reign FC		Utah

=== Notable undrafted players ===
Below is a list of undrafted rookies who appeared in a competitive NWSL game in 2016.

Nat.	Player	Pos.	Original NWSL team	College	Notes
(United States)	Celeste Boureille	M	Portland Thorns FC	California	
(United States)	Megan Crosson	D	Houston Dash	Santa Clara	
(United States)	Caity Heap	M	Houston Dash	Texas Tech	
(United States)	Elise Krieghoff	F	Boston Breakers	Cal Poly	
(United States)	Erin Simon	D	Sky Blue FC	Syracuse	
(United States)	Taylor Smith	D	Western New York Flash	UCLA	
(United States)	Andi Tostanoski	G	Seattle Reign FC	Santa Clara	
(United States)	Catherine Zimmerman	F	Sky Blue FC	Providence	

== Trades ==
Round 1:

Round 2:

Round 3:

Round 4:

== Summary ==
In 2016, a total of 27 colleges had players selected. Of these, 13 had a player drafted to the NWSL for the first time: Arizona State, Arkansas, Cal State Fullerton, California, DePaul, Hofstra, LSU, Northern Colorado, Rutgers, San Francisco, St. John's, Texas and Utah.

=== Schools with multiple draft selections ===
Selections	Schools
4	North Carolina
3	Florida State, Penn State, Virginia
2	Arizona State, Notre Dame, Rutgers, Texas Tech

=== Selections by college athletic conference ===
Conference	Round 1	Round 2	Round 3	Round 4	Total
ACC	5	4	3	1	13
Big East	1	0	1	0	2
Big Sky	0	0	0	1	1
Big Ten	1	2	2	1	6
Big West	0	1	0	0	1
Big 12	1	1	1	0	3
Colonial	0	1	1	0	2
Pac-12	1	1	2	1	5
SEC	1	0	0	4	5
West Coast	0	0	0	2	2

=== Selections by position ===
Position	Round 1	Round 2	Round 3	Round 4	Total
Goalkeeper	0	0	3	2	5
Defender	5	3	4	4	16
Midfielder	1	2	1	2	6
Forward	4	5	2	2	13

== See also ==
- List of NWSL drafts
- List of National Women's Soccer League draftees by college team
- 2016 National Women's Soccer League season
