= Madison Tiernan =

American soccer player

Personal information
- Full name: Madison Tiernan
- Date of birth: July 3, 1995 (age 31)
- Place of birth: Voorhees, New Jersey, United States
- Height: 5 ft 4 in (1.63 m)
- Position: Midfielder

Youth career
- Eastern Regional HS
- PDA

College career
Years	Team	Apps	(Gls)
2013–2016	Rutgers Scarlet Knights	88	(25)

Senior career*
Years	Team	Apps	(Gls)
2017–2020	Sky Blue FC	42	(5)
- * Club domestic league appearances and goals as of September 8, 2018

Madison Tiernan (born July 3, 1995) is an American former professional soccer player who last played as a midfielder for Sky Blue FC of the National Women's Soccer League.

== Early life and collegiate career ==
Tiernan attended the Eastern Regional High School, earning several accolades during her period there. She was nominated twice All-American (2011, 2012), All-State selection in 2009–2012, three-time Regional All-American (2010–2012) and four-time Top 20 All-State selection. Tiernan was also named SJSCA Offensive Player of the Year (2011 and 2012), NSCAA NJ Girls' Soccer Player of the Year and was ranked No. 1 Girls Soccer Player in New Jersey and Region 1.

=== Rutgers Scarlet Knights, 2013–2016 ===
Tiernan attended Rutgers University from 2013 to 2016. She played 88 matches (starting 85) for the Scarlet Knights, scoring 25 goals and notching 16 assists. Tiernan won several honours at college, including being named South Jersey Soccer Coaches Association (SJSCA) College Player of the Year. She was also named to the American Athletic Second Team All-Conference squad, All-Rookie Team and American Athletic Championships All-Tournament Team.

== Club career ==
On January 12, 2017, Tiernan became the 24th overall pick in the 2017 NWSL College Draft, when she was chosen by Sky Blue FC. On April 23, she debuted for the SBFC, replacing Leah Galton in the 71st minute of the match against Boston Breakers. On May 27, Madison was part of the starting XI for the SBFC for the first time at Yurcak Field, same field where she started her college career. Tiernan was replaced at the 75th minute by Leah Galton.
