= Caroline Casey (soccer) =

American soccer player

Personal information
- Full name: Caroline Rachel Casey
- Date of birth: May 27, 1994 (age 32)
- Place of birth: Chesapeake, Virginia
- Height: 5 ft 8 in (1.73 m)
- Position: Goalkeeper

College career
Years	Team	Apps	(Gls)
2012–2015	William & Mary Tribe	78	(0)

Senior career*
Years	Team	Apps	(Gls)
2016–2018	Sky Blue FC	13	(0)

International career
2011	United States U18		
- * Club domestic league appearances and goals

Caroline Rachel Casey (born May 27, 1994) is an American former soccer player who played as a goalkeeper for Sky Blue FC in the NWSL.

== Education ==
Casey completed her undergraduate education at the College of William & Mary in Williamsburg, VA in 2016 with a degree in Kinesiology and Health Sciences.

== Club career ==
Casey was drafted by Sky Blue FC with the 29th overall pick in the 2016 NWSL College Draft.

== Career statistics ==
Appearances and goals by club, season and competition
Club	Season	League			Playoffs (Note: Includes NWSL playoffs)		Total	
Club	Season	Division	Apps	Goals	Apps	Goals	Apps	Goals
Sky Blue FC	2016	NWSL	10	0	—		10	0
Sky Blue FC	2017	NWSL	2	0	—		2	0
Sky Blue FC	2018	NWSL	1	0	—		1	0
Career total			13	0	0	0	13	0
