= Kailen Sheridan =

Canadian soccer player (born 1995)

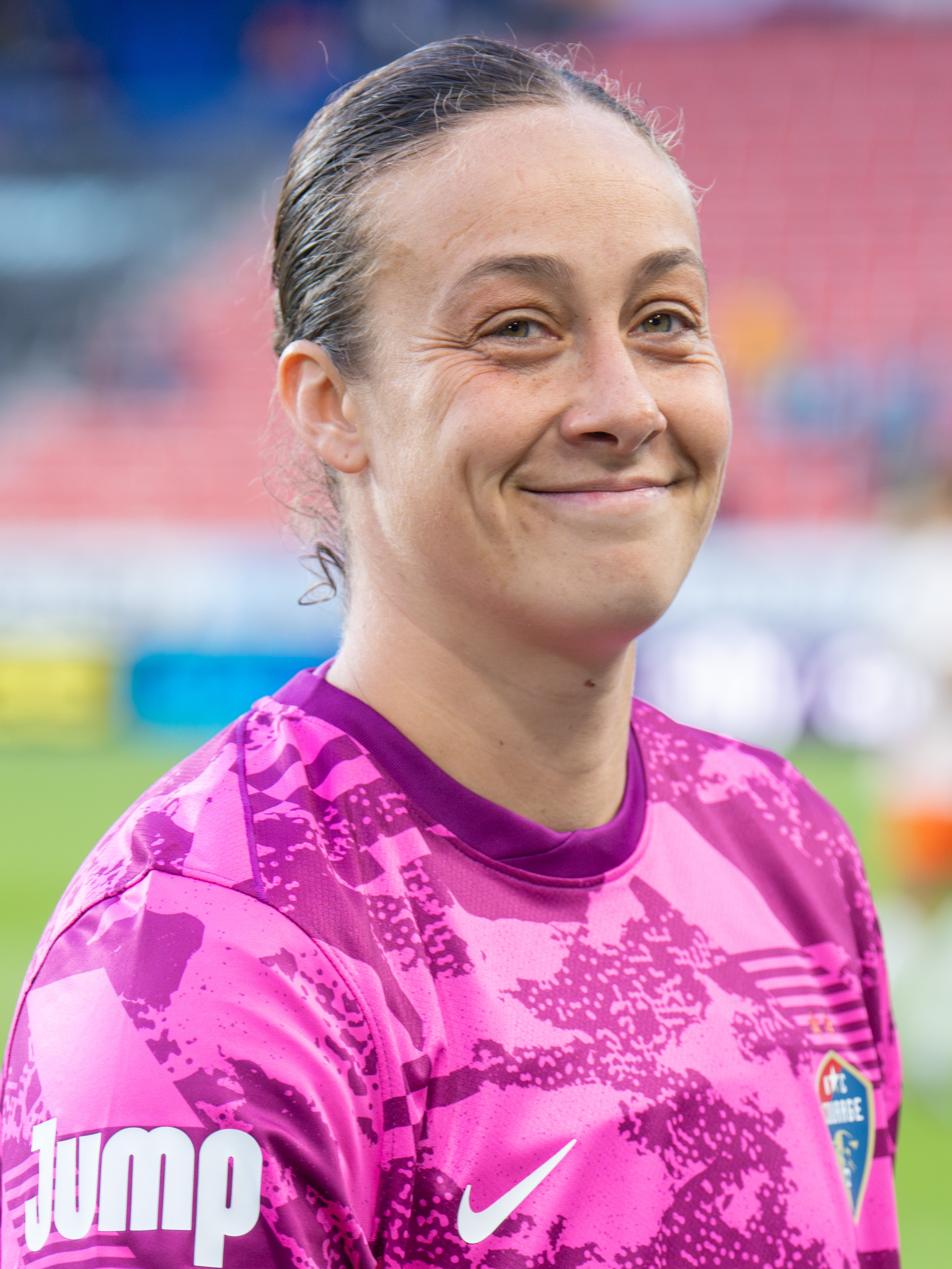
- Sheridan with North Carolina Courage in 2026

Personal information
- Full name: Kailen Mary Iacovoni Sheridan
- Date of birth: July 16, 1995 (age 31)
- Place of birth: Pickering, Ontario, Canada
- Height: 5 ft 9 in (1.75 m)
- Position: Goalkeeper

Team information
- Current team: North Carolina Courage
- Number: 1

Youth career
- Pickering SC
- Ajax United SC
- Whitby SC
- ANB Futbol
- Toronto Lady Lynx

College career
Years	Team	Apps	(Gls)
2013–2016	Clemson Tigers	76	(0)

Senior career*
Years	Team	Apps	(Gls)
2013	Toronto Lady Lynx		
2017–2021	NJ/NY Gotham FC (Note: Sky Blue FC changed its name to NJ/NY Gotham FC in 2021)	80	(0)
2022–2025	San Diego Wave	86	(0)
2026–	North Carolina Courage	30	(0)

International career^{‡}
2012	Canada U17	9	(0)
2014	Canada U20	4	(0)
2015	Canada U23	1	(0)
2016–	Canada	71	(0)
Medal record
Women's football
Representing Canada
CONCACAF W Championship
Runner-up	2018
Olympic Games
Gold medal – first place	2020	Team
- * Club domestic league appearances and goals as of 06:57, November 8, 2026 (UTC) ‡ National team caps and goals as of October 12, 2026

Kailen Mary Iacovoni Sheridan (born July 16, 1995) is a Canadian professional soccer player who plays as a goalkeeper for the North Carolina Courage of the National Women's Soccer League (NWSL) and the Canada national team.

Sheridan played college soccer for the Clemson Tigers and was drafted by Sky Blue FC (later NJ/NY Gotham FC) in the third round of the 2017 NWSL College Draft. After five seasons there, she was traded to expansion club San Diego Wave, winning NWSL Goalkeeper of the Year in their debut season in 2022 and the NWSL Shield in 2023.

Sheridan made her senior debut for Canada in 2016, since making over 60 appearances. She won gold with the national team at the 2020 Olympics and was also part of the squads at the 2019 and 2023 FIFA Women's World Cups and the 2024 Olympics.

== College career ==
Sheridan played her college soccer for the Clemson Tigers. Sheridan played for the Tigers from 2013 to 2016 under coach Eddie Radwanski. Sheridan made 76 appearances for the Tigers recording 229 saves and 28 shutouts. In both 2014 and 2015, Sheridan was named to the All-ACC first team. Her nomination to the team in 2014 was the first for a Tiger since 2007.

== Club career ==
=== Toronto Lady Lynx ===
In 2013, she played with the Toronto Lady Lynx.

=== NJ/NY Gotham ===
In January 2017, Sheridan was selected as the 23rd overall pick by Sky Blue FC at the 2017 NWSL College Draft. She was later named an allocated player by Canada Soccer.

Sheridan was named to the Team of the Month for May 2017, she recorded 19 saves during the month, helping Sky Blue to a 3–1–0 record. Sheridan's 2018 season saw her start and play all but one of Sky Blue's games. She started her 2019 season by winning back-to-back NWSL Saves of the Week in weeks 2 and 3. Sheridan was a finalist for NWSL Goalkeeper of the Year twice at Sky Blue / Gotham FC in 2019 and 2021.

=== San Diego Wave ===
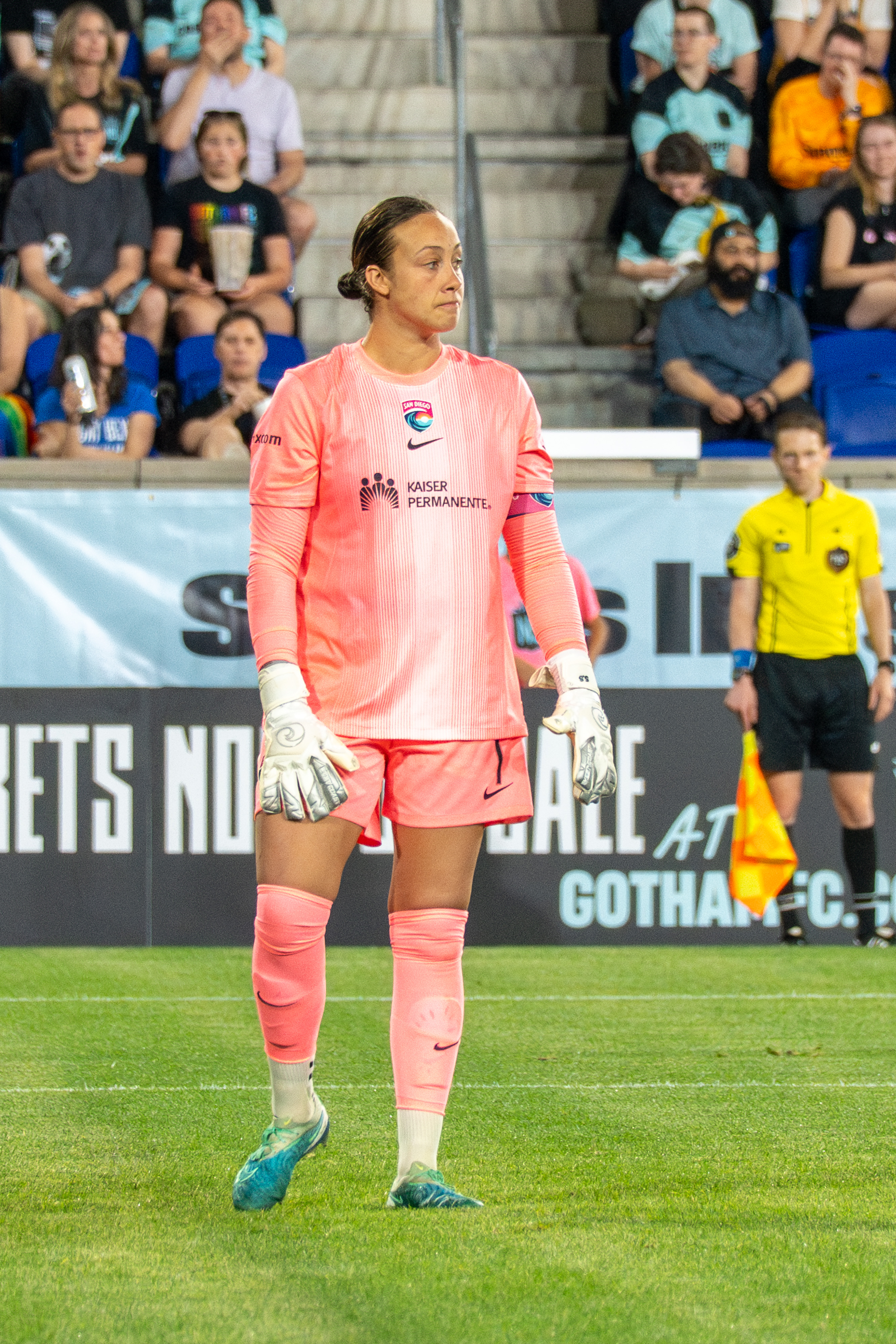
Kailen Sheridan with the San Diego Wave in 2025

After five seasons in New Jersey, Sheridan was traded to NWSL expansion club San Diego Wave in December 2021 in exchange for $130,000 in allocation money and expansion draft protection. She led the Wave to qualify for the playoffs in their first year of play and was voted Goalkeeper of the Year.

Sheridan kept a league-best nine clean sheets in the 2023 regular season as the Wave won the NWSL Shield and was again nominated for Goalkeeper of the Year.

At the end of 2025, Sheridan departed from San Diego on a mutual contract termination. She had made over 86 appearances for the Californian club.

=== North Carolina Courage ===
In January 2026, Sheridan signed a two-year contract with the North Carolina Courage. She was named a team captain going into the season alongside Natalie Jacobs and Ryan Williams.

== International career ==
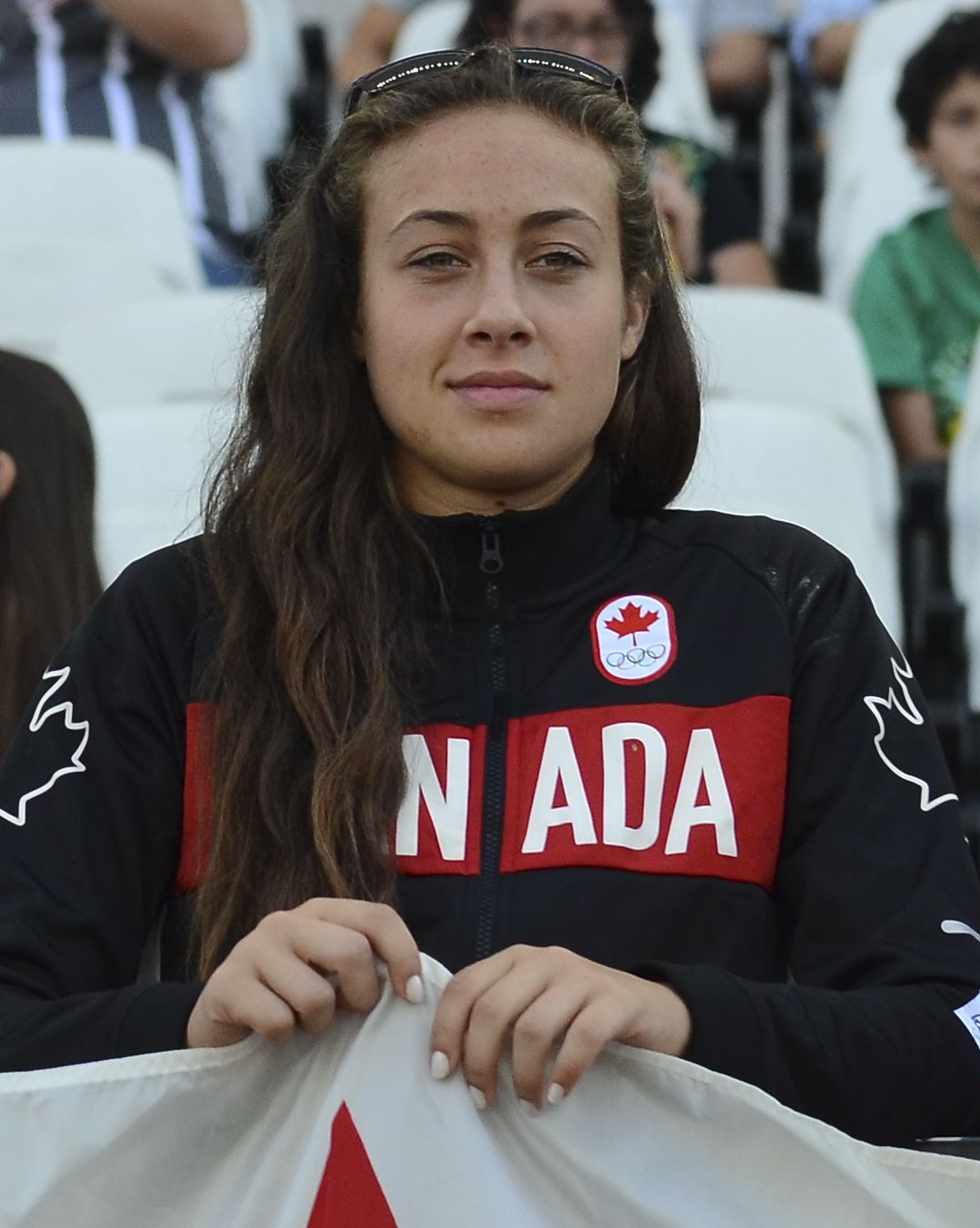
Sheridan in 2016

Sheridan has represented Canada on the senior national team as well as numerous youth national teams including the U-17, U-20, and U-23 teams. She made her debut for the senior national team in March 2016 at the 2016 Algarve Cup. Sheridan was an alternate at the 2016 Summer Olympics in Rio de Janeiro. She was later called up for the 2017 Algarve Cup.

With Stephanie Labbé as Canada's starting goalkeeper, Sheridan was used sparingly in her early years with the team, starting three games in 2017, two in 2018, one in 2019, and two in 2020. She was added to the roster for the 2018 CONCACAF W Championship after an injury to backup goalkeeper Erin McLeod. The following year, she was part of the Canadian roster for the 2019 FIFA World Cup.

Given the start against the United States at the 2021 SheBelieves Cup, Sheridan exited the game after tearing a quad muscle in the seventh minute. She underwent surgery, and was able to return to the roster in time to be named to the Canadian Olympic team for the 2020 Summer Olympics in Tokyo. She first appeared in relief of Labbé after the latter was injured midway through the team's opening match, a 1–1 draw with hosts Japan. She then played the full group stage match against Chile, a 2–1 victory. Labbé returned for the final group match against Great Britain and would remain in goal for the remainder of the tournament that saw Canada win Olympic gold.

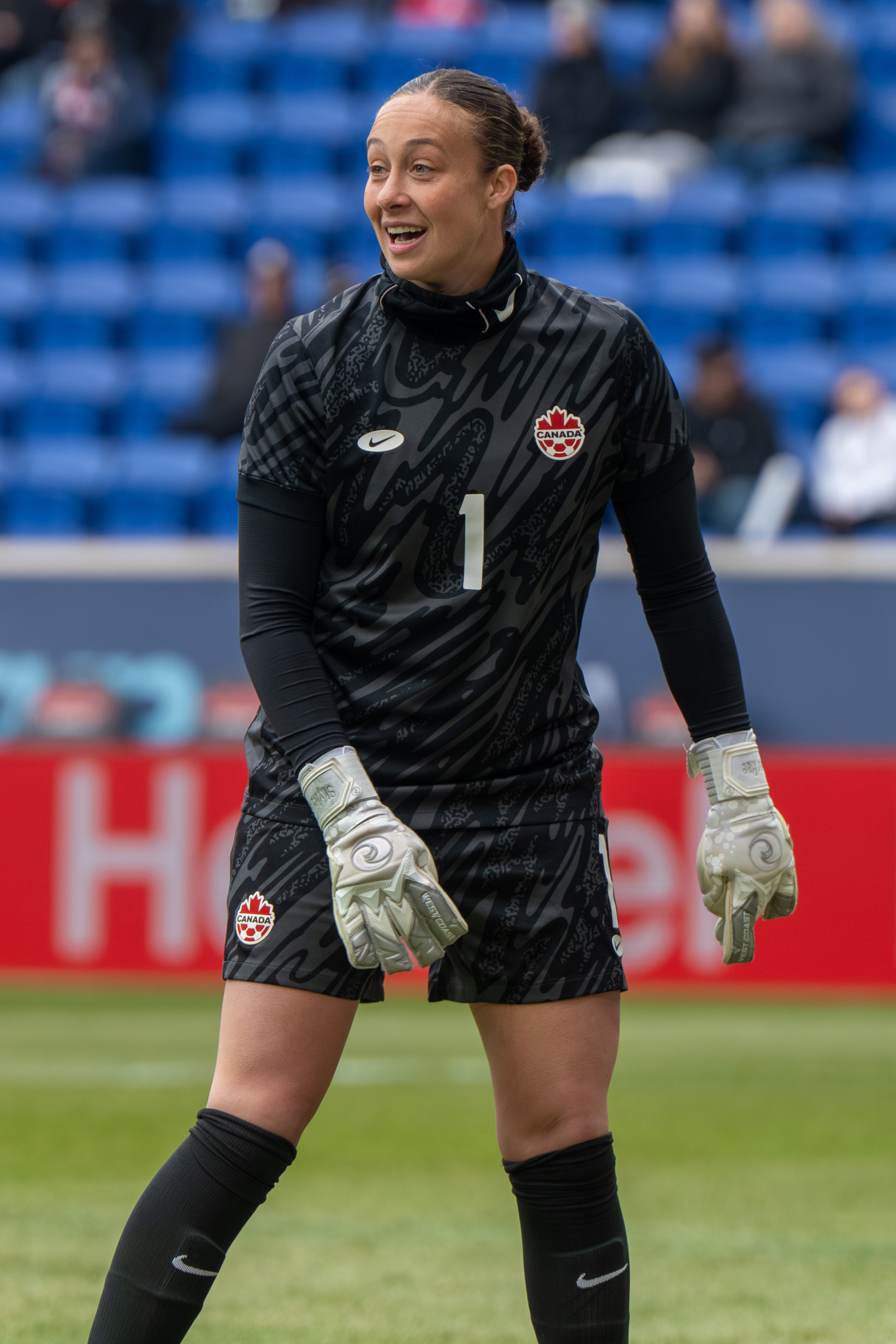
Sheridan with Canada in 2026

Sheridan's usage began to increase following the Olympics, starting a total of seven games in 2021. With the retirement of Labbé in 2022, Sheridan became Canada's starting goalkeeper. She won the Golden Glove as the best goalkeeper at the 2022 CONCACAF W Championship, allowing only one goal in five appearances that saw Canada qualify for the 2023 FIFA World Cup. She was also named to the tournament's Best XI.

Going into the 2023 FIFA World Cup in Australia as Canada's starting goalkeeper, there were expectations that Sheridan could significantly boost her profile in light of her success both in CONCACAF and in the NWSL. However, in the midst of what was overall a difficult tournament for the Canadians, Sheridan struggled. After keeping a clean sheet in the team's opening match against Nigeria, she allowed an Olympico goal off a corner kick from Katie McCabe in the opening minutes against Ireland and had difficulty distributing the ball. Despite this Canada won the match 2–1. In the final match against Australia, Canada was defeated 4–0, and thus were knocked out of the World Cup. Sheridan's performance was considered shaky, with particular fault given to the second Australian goal. Sportsnet dubbed it "a tournament she'd just as soon forget."

Sheridan was called up to the Canada squad for the 2024 Summer Olympics.

Sheridan was called up for the 2026 FIFA Series in Brazil, where she featured in a 1–0 loss to Brazil in the final, as Canada finished in second in the tournament on April 18, 2026.

== Personal life ==
Sheridan became engaged to her partner Dominique Dorris in 2022. The couple married on December 16, 2023. In 2025, they welcomed their first child, a daughter named Skyler Rae.

== Career statistics ==
=== Club ===
As of July 12, 2026

Appearances and goals by club, season and competition
Club	Season	League			Cup (Note: Includes the NWSL Challenge Cup)		Playoffs (Note: Includes NWSL Playoffs)		Continental (Note: Includes CONCACAF W Champions Cup)		Other		Total	
Club	Season	Division	Apps	Goals	Apps	Goals	Apps	Goals	Apps	Goals	Apps	Goals	Apps	Goals
NJ/NY Gotham FC	2017	NWSL	22	0	—		—		—		—		22	0
NJ/NY Gotham FC	2018	NWSL	23	0	—		—		—		—		23	0
NJ/NY Gotham FC	2019	NWSL	19	0	—		—		—		—		19	0
NJ/NY Gotham FC	2020	NWSL	—		6	0	—		—		4 (Note: Includes NWSL Fall Series)	0	10	0
NJ/NY Gotham FC	2021	NWSL	16	0	0	0	1	0	—		—		17	0
NJ/NY Gotham FC	Total		80	0	6	0	1	0	0	0	4	0	91	0
San Diego Wave FC	2022	NWSL	18	0	4	0	2	0	—		—		24	0
San Diego Wave FC	2023	NWSL	19	0	1	0	1	0	—		—		21	0
San Diego Wave FC	2024	NWSL	25	0	1	0	—		3	0	0	0	29	0
San Diego Wave FC	2025	NWSL	24	0	0	0	1	0	0	0	0	0	25	0
San Diego Wave FC	Total		86	0	6	0	4	0	3	0	0	0	99	0
North Carolina Courage	2026	NWSL	13	0	0	0	0	0	0	0	0	0	13	0
Career total			179	0	12	0	5	0	3	0	4	0	203	0

=== International ===
As of match played October 12, 2026

Appearances and goals by national team and year
National team	Year	Apps	Goals
Canada	2016	1	0
Canada	2017	3	0
Canada	2018	2	0
Canada	2019	1	0
Canada	2020	2	0
Canada	2021	7	0
Canada	2022	15	0
Canada	2023	12	0
Canada	2024	13	0
Canada	2025	7	0
Canada	2026	8	0
Total		71	0

== Honours ==
San Diego Wave

- NWSL Shield: 2023
- NWSL Challenge Cup: 2024

Canada

- Summer Olympics: 2021

Individual

- CONCACAF W Championship Best XI: 2022
- CONCACAF W Championship Golden Glove: 2022
- NWSL Goalkeeper of the Year: 2022
- NWSL Best XI: 2021, 2022
- NWSL Challenge Cup Golden Glove: 2020
