= Kelly Conheeney =

American soccer player

Personal information
- Full name: Kelly Conheeney
- Date of birth: January 24, 1991 (age 35)
- Place of birth: Ridgewood, New Jersey
- Height: 5 ft 5 in (1.65 m)
- Position: Midfielder

College career
Years	Team	Apps	(Gls)
2009–2013	Virginia Tech Hokies	72	(26)

Senior career*
Years	Team	Apps	(Gls)
2012	Ottawa Fury		
2016	Sky Blue FC	13	(1)
2017	Houston Dash	0	(0)
2018	Hammarby IF DFF	9	(1)

International career
2010	United States U20		
- * Club domestic league appearances and goals as of September 25, 2016

Kelly Conheeney (born January 24, 1991) is an American soccer player who plays as a midfielder.

A native of Ridgewood, New Jersey, Conheeney played soccer at Ridgewood High School.

== Career ==
In 2012, she played with the Ottawa Fury, scoring the final penalty kick in the league championship game to win the league title.

Conheeney suffered a concussion while at Virginia Tech in 2012, and was sidelined for three years. In April 2016, she made the opening day roster for Sky Blue FC. She scored the game-winning goal in Sky Blue FC's first game of the 2016 NWSL season.
