= Leah Galton =

English footballer

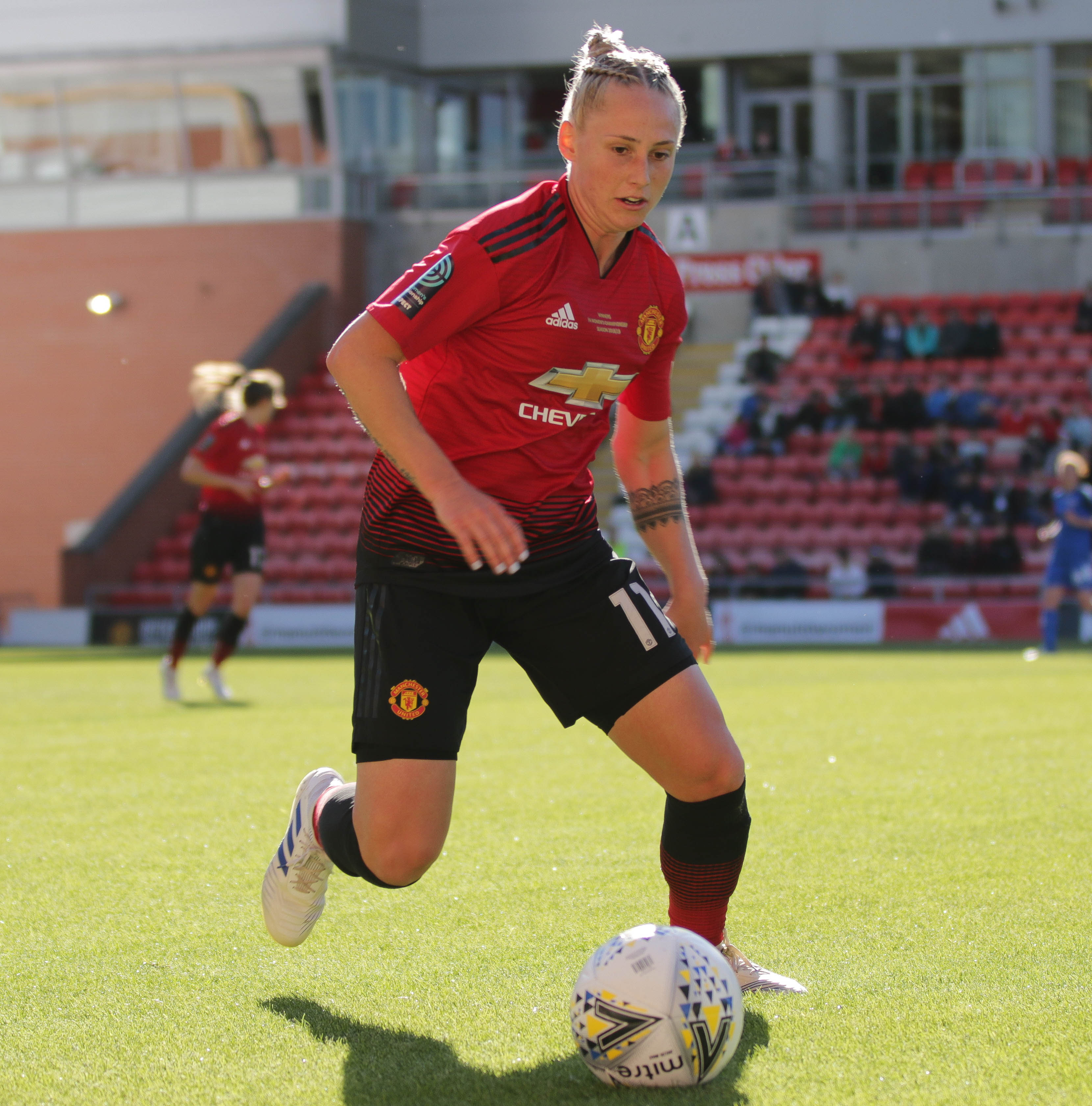
- Galton playing for Manchester United in 2019

Personal information
- Full name: Leah Danielle Galton
- Date of birth: 24 May 1994 (age 32)
- Place of birth: Harrogate, England
- Height: 5 ft 7 in (1.70 m)
- Position: Forward

Team information
- Current team: Burnley
- Number: 44

Youth career
- Knaresborough Celtic
- Harrogate Railway
- Leeds United

College career
Years	Team	Apps	(Gls)
2012–2015	Hofstra Pride	82	(48)

Senior career*
Years	Team	Apps	(Gls)
2010–2012	Leeds United	33	(8)
2016–2017	Sky Blue FC	30	(5)
2018	Bayern Munich	1	(0)
2018–2026	Manchester United	125	(38)
2026–	Burnley	0	(0)

International career
	England U15	0	(0)
2009–2011	England U17	8	(0)
2011	England U19	2	(0)
2016	England U23	0	(0)
- * Club domestic league appearances and goals as of 16 September 2026

Leah Danielle Galton (born 24 May 1994) is an English footballer who plays as a forward for Women's Super League 2 club Burnley.

She has previously played for Sky Blue FC in the NWSL, Bayern Munich in Germany and Manchester United in the WSL, and has represented England from under-15 to under-23 level.

== Club career ==
=== Youth career ===
Galton started as a junior at Knaresborough Celtic before a spell at Harrogate Railway. She impressed local Leeds United coaches who recruited her for the academy where she rose through the youth ranks to the senior team. She scored her first senior goal for the team on 12 September 2010, aged 16, in a 4–1 Premier League Cup group stage win against Newcastle United Ladies. In 2012, she won the Ian Taylor Memorial Trophy, awarded to the most deserving young footballer playing within the Harrogate and District FA.

=== Hofstra Pride ===
In 2012, she earned a four-year scholarship to play collegiality for Hofstra Pride in America. Her 48 goals is the second-highest total in the program's history, her 26 assists tie her for first in total assists and her 122 career points are a program record. She is also the only three-time winner of the Colonial Athletic Association player of the year award and was a MAC Hermann Trophy semifinalist in her senior year.

=== Sky Blue FC ===
In January 2016, Galton was drafted by Sky Blue FC in the second round of the 2016 NWSL College Draft. However, per visa requirements, Galton was unable to join the team until after graduation. On 19 May 2016, she was added to roster. She scored her first goal for the club during her second appearance, an equaliser that helped Sky Blue to a 1–1 draw against the Chicago Red Stars.

=== Bayern Munich ===
On 22 December 2017, she signed with German club Bayern Munich in the Frauen-Bundesliga. She made her league debut in a 2–1 win against SGS Essen on 18 February 2018. In March, she stated that she would be taking a break from playing professionally.

=== Manchester United ===
On 13 July 2018, it was announced that Galton was joining Manchester United for their inaugural season. She made her competitive debut for Manchester United, as a 59th-minute substitute for Kirsty Hanson, in a 1–0 League Cup victory against Liverpool on 19 August and her Championship debut in a 12–0 win against Aston Villa on 9 September. On 13 December, she scored her first goal for the club in a 3–0 win over Everton in the FA WSL Cup. She scored her first league goal in a 5–1 win over fellow title challengers Tottenham Hotspur on 31 March 2019.

On 27 January 2020, Galton signed a new contract with United until the end of the 2020–21 season, with an option for a further year. She was voted FA WSL Player of the Month for December 2020 after scoring in all three of United's games including a brace against Bristol City. On 5 February 2021, Galton signed a new three-and-a-half-year contract with Manchester United until 2024 with the option for an additional year. She signed a further two-year extension with the club on 31 January 2024.

On 29 April 2026, it was announced that Galton would leave Manchester United upon the expiry of her contract at the end of the 2025–26 season. She departed as the club's second-highest goalscorer behind Ella Toone with 44 goals, having made the third-most appearances behind Toone and Millie Turner.

=== Burnley ===
On 16 September 2026, Galton signed for WSL 2 club Burnley on a one-year contract with the option for a further year.

== International career ==
Galton has been capped internationally for England at under-15, under-17 and under-19 level, and was part of the squad for the 2011 UEFA Women's Under-17 Championship.

She was a key player for the under-23s at the 2016 La Manga Tournament which led to her being called up to train with the senior England national team for the first time in August 2016 by Mark Sampson, but had to pull out due to a hip injury. In October 2019, amid good form for Manchester United, it was reported Phil Neville was considering a call-up for Galton. However, she made herself unavailable for international duty and was supported in her decision by club manager Casey Stoney. In February 2022, following discussions with Sarina Wiegman, she affirmed her decision, explaining "It's not anything to do with the setup or the girls. It's more about me having my own time and having a break when everyone else goes around national duty, I need that time to myself. It's something I have noted in my life that I need. Otherwise, I get too stuck into work mode. Then I start not enjoying it."

== Personal life ==
In May 2019, Galton shared photos on social media following her engagement to partner Sheridan Douglas.

== Career statistics ==
=== Club ===
As of match played 2 May 2026.

Appearances and goals by club, season and competition
Club	Season	League			Cup (Note: Includes DFB-Pokal and Women's FA Cup)		League Cup (Note: Includes the WPL Cup and Women's League Cup)		Europe (Note: Includes the UEFA Women's Champions League)		Total	
Club	Season	Division	Apps	Goals	Apps	Goals	Apps	Goals	Apps	Goals	Apps	Goals
Leeds United	2010–11	WPL National	14	5	0	0	1	0	—		15	5
Leeds United	2011–12	WPL National	19	3	0	0	4	1	—		23	4
Leeds United	Total		33	8	0	0	5	1	—		38	9
Sky Blue FC	2016	NWSL	14	3	—		—		—		14	3
Sky Blue FC	2017	NWSL	16	2	—		—		—		16	2
Sky Blue FC	Total		30	5	0	0	0	0	—		30	5
Bayern Munich	2017–18	Bundesliga	1	0	1	0	—		0	0	2	0
Manchester United	2018–19	Championship	14	3	2	0	5	1	—		21	4
Manchester United	2019–20	WSL	12	4	0	0	2	0	—		14	4
Manchester United	2020–21	WSL	17	6	1	0	3	0	—		21	6
Manchester United	2021–22	WSL	21	8	1	0	6	0	—		28	8
Manchester United	2022–23	WSL	20	10	3	2	1	0	—		24	12
Manchester United	2023–24	WSL	18	2	4	0	3	1	2	0	27	3
Manchester United	2024–25	WSL	18	5	5	2	4	0	—		27	7
Manchester United	2025–26	WSL	5	0	0	0	0	0	5	0	10	0
Manchester United	Total		125	38	16	4	24	2	7	0	172	44
Career total			189	51	17	4	29	3	7	0	242	58

== Honours ==
Manchester United

- FA Women's Championship: 2018–19
- Women's FA Cup: 2023–24; runner-up: 2022–23, 2024–25

Individual

- FA WSL Player of the Month: December 2020, January 2022, December 2022
