= McKenzie Meehan =

American retired soccer player (born 1994)

Personal information
- Full name: McKenzie Mary Meehan
- Date of birth: December 25, 1994 (age 31)
- Place of birth: Glocester, Rhode Island, United States
- Height: 5 ft 5 in (1.65 m)
- Position: Forward

Youth career
- La Salle Academy
- 2009–2011: Scorpions SC

College career
Years	Team	Apps	(Gls)
2012–2016	Boston College Eagles	88	(58)

Senior career*
Years	Team	Apps	(Gls)
2017–2019	Sky Blue FC	31	(0)
2019–2020	North Carolina Courage	3	(1)

International career
2012	United States U18		
2013–2014	United States U20		
2016	United States U23		
- * Club domestic league appearances and goals as of June 11, 2019

McKenzie Mary Meehan (born December 25, 1994) is an American retired soccer player who last played as a forward for North Carolina Courage of the National Women's Soccer League (NWSL).

== Early life ==
Meehan attended the La Salle Academy, scoring 181 goals and notching 28 assists in her high schools years. For her performance, she earned several accolades. Meehan was elected the Rhode Island Gatorade Player of the Year (2010 & 2011). She was also included in the Rhode Island All-State first team and NSCAA High School All-Region (2009, 2010, 2011), NSCAA High School All-American (2010 & 2011). Meehan also helped her high school team to capture the State Championships four times in a row.

=== Boston College Eagles ===
In 2012, Meehan started attending the Boston College. After missing the entire season, with an Achilles injury in 2014, she managed to score a total of 58 goals in 88 matches for the Eagles. Meehan was included in the NSCAA All-Southeast Region Third-Team and All-ACC Second-Team in 2013. In 2012, as a freshman, she was named to the All-ACC Freshman team. In 2016, as a senior, she was named to the All-ACC First Team, among other accolades along his careers with the Eagles.

== Club career ==
=== Sky Blue FC, 2017–2019 ===
Meehan was chosen by Sky Blue FC with the 34th overall pick in the 2017 NWSL College Draft. On April 30, 2017, Meehan debuted for SBFC, when she replaced Daphne Corboz in the 80th minute of the match against FC Kansas City. She made 17 appearances in her rookie season with Sky Blue.

=== North Carolina Courage, 2019–2020 ===
On June 11, 2019, Meehan was traded to North Carolina Courage in exchange for Elizabeth Eddy.

== International career ==
Meehan played for the United States U18 in 2012. In the beginning of 2013, she was called for the first time for the United States U20 team. She, then, played a key role in the team that secured a berth for the 2014 FIFA U-20 Women's World Cup. In the 2014 CONCACAF Women's U-20 Championship, she scored 6 goals and alongside Tanya Samarzich became the competition's high scorer. On July 17, 2014, Meehan was included in the 21-players squad that would represent United States at the 2014 FIFA U-20 Women's World Cup. However, before the competition starts, she was cut from the roster due to an injury and was replaced by Rachel Hill.

On May 25, 2016, Meehan was called to the 20-players roster that represented United States U23 at the Nordic Tournament, an important youth competition.
