= Maya Hayes =

American soccer coach and player (born 1992)

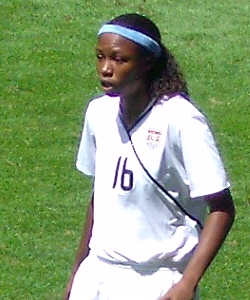
- Hayes at the 2010 FIFA U-20 Women's World Cup

Personal information
- Full name: Maya Alexandria Hayes
- Date of birth: March 26, 1992 (age 34)
- Place of birth: New York City, U.S.
- Height: 5 ft 7 in (1.70 m)
- Position: Forward

Team information
- Current team: Minnesota Golden Gophers (assistant)

Youth career
- 2000–2001: Montclair Blue
- 2002–2004: Montclair Starbursts
- 2005–2006: Match Fit PSV
- 2007–2009: Montclair Aristocats

College career
Years	Team	Apps	(Gls)
2010–2013	Penn State Nittany Lions	89	(71)

Senior career*
Years	Team	Apps	(Gls)
2014–2017	Sky Blue FC	74	(9)

International career
- United States U-18
2010–2012	United States U-20	42	(16)

Managerial career
- 2018–2019: Auburn Tigers (GA)
- 2020–: Minnesota Golden Gophers (assistant)
- * Club domestic league appearances and goals

Maya Alexandria Hayes (born March 26, 1992) is an American soccer coach and former player, who is currently the assistant coach for the Minnesota Golden Gophers women's soccer team.

Hayes last played in 2017 as a forward for Sky Blue FC of the National Women's Soccer League. A United States youth international, Hayes won the 2012 FIFA U-20 Women's World Cup in Japan.

== Early life ==
Hayes was born in New York City to Irene Smith and Derek Hayes. She has four siblings. Hayes attended Newark Academy, a private school located in Livingston, New Jersey. She grew up in West Orange, New Jersey.

== College career ==
Hayes attended Pennsylvania State University from 2010 to 2013 where she played for the Nittany Lions. In 2011, she scored 31 goals, earned 70 points, and led the nation in goals and points. She set a new Penn State and Big Ten Conference record for points in a single season. Hayes finished her Penn State career having scored 71 goals in 89 matches, the third-most in program history.

In January 2020, she was named to TopDrawerSoccer.com's best XI of the 2010s.

== Club career ==
Hayes was selected by Sky Blue FC in the first round (sixth overall pick) of the 2014 NWSL College Draft. A few weeks later, the team signed her.

In 2018, it was announced that she had made the decision to sit out the 2018 NWSL season to pursue graduate studies at Auburn University. She does not consider this an official retirement.

== International career ==
Hayes previously played for the United States under-18 women's national soccer team. She competed for the United States at the 2010 and 2012 FIFA Under-20 Women's World Cup tournaments. On August 20, 2012, at Hiroshima Big Arch, she scored a hat-trick in a 4–0 win against Ghana, in the first match played by the United States at the 2012 FIFA Under-20 Women's World Cup; the first goal was an own goal by Ghanaian Linda Addai. Three days later, at the same venue, in the second match against China, she scored a 36th-minute equalizer goal to tie the game at 1-1, which was also the final score. In their last match in Group D, the United States team conceded a 0–3 loss to Germany; and advanced to the second stage based on goal difference, with all goals scored by Hayes besides one aforementioned own goal. With no further goal from Hayes in the knock-out stage, the United States team won the 2012 Japan FIFA Under-20 Women's World Cup tournament with two goals from Kealia Ohai and one goal each from Vanessa DiBernardo and Morgan Brian.

== See also ==
- 2012 CONCACAF Under-20 Women's Championship squads
- 2010 FIFA U-20 Women's World Cup squads
