= Kayla Mills =

American soccer player

Personal information
- Full name: Kayla Danielle Mills
- Date of birth: November 8, 1995 (age 31)
- Place of birth: West Covina, California
- Height: 5 ft 9 in (1.75 m)
- Position: Defender

College career
Years	Team	Apps	(Gls)
2013–2016	USC Trojans	89	(8)

Senior career*
Years	Team	Apps	(Gls)
2017–2018	Sky Blue FC	16	(0)
2018–2020	CSFA Ambilly	21	(2)
2020–2021	Issy	20	(0)

International career
2011–2012	United States U17		
2013–2014	United States U20		
2015–2017	United States U23		
- * Club domestic league appearances and goals

Kayla Danielle Mills (born November 8, 1995) is an American former soccer player.

== Career ==
Mills spent her college soccer career at USC where she played from 2013 to 2016. She was part of the team in 2016 that won the NCAA National Championship.

Mills was drafted by Sky Blue FC with the 4th overall pick in the 2017 NWSL College Draft. She appeared in 16 games in 2017, starting 13 of them. Mills was named to Sky Blue FC's 2018 roster. She was released by Sky Blue on June 15, 2018, to make room on the roster for Imani Dorsey. Mills did not appear in a game for Sky Blue in 2018.

After being released by Sky Blue, Mills signed with CSFA Ambilly in the D2, in France. She made her debut for the team on September 23, 2018. At the end of the season 2019-2020 stopped before the end by COVID-19, she signed with another French Team, FF Issy, promoted in D1

== Personal life ==
Mills is a native of West Covina, California, and attended Flintridge Sacred Heart Academy. She majored in communication at the University of Southern California.

== Honors ==
USC Trojans

- NCAA Division I Women's Soccer Championship: 2016
