= Rutgers Scarlet Knights women's soccer =

American college soccer team

- Founded: 1984; 42 years ago
- University: Rutgers University–New Brunswick
- Head coach: Mike O'Neill (11th season)
- Conference: Big Ten
- Location: Piscataway, New Jersey, US
- Stadium: Yurcak Field (capacity: 5,000)
- Nickname: Scarlet Knights
- Colors: Scarlet
Home	Away

NCAA tournament College Cup
- 2015, 2021

NCAA tournament Quarterfinals
- 2015, 2021

NCAA tournament appearances
- 1987, 2001, 2003, 2006, 2008, 2009, 2012, 2013, 2014, 2015, 2016, 2017, 2018, 2019, 2020, 2021, 2022, 2023

The Rutgers Scarlet Knights women's soccer team represents Rutgers University–New Brunswick in National Collegiate Athletic Association Division I women's soccer. The team competes in the Big Ten Conference and is currently coached by Mike O'Neill. The Scarlet Knights reached the NCAA Tournament College Cup in 2015 and 2021.

== Current roster ==
As of 12 Sep 2024

Note: Flags indicate national team as defined under FIFA eligibility rules; some limited exceptions apply. Players may hold more than one non-FIFA nationality.

No.	Pos.	Nation	Player
0	GK	USA	Olivia Bodmer
1	GK	USA	Rachel Quigley
2	FW	USA	Gia Girman
3	MF	USA	Shaela Bradley
6	FW	USA	Reilly McGlinn
7	MF	USA	Brianna Azevedo
8	MF	USA	Kylie Daigle
9	DF	USA	Sydney Urban
11	FW	USA	Charlotte Garcia
12	FW	USA	Olivia Russomanno
13	DF	USA	Audrey Cain
14	FW	USA	Alyssa Martinez
15	DF	USA	Emily Mason
16	DF	USA	Kassidy Banks
17	FW	USA	Ashley Baran
18	MF	USA	Gianna Delgado

No.	Pos.	Nation	Player
20	DF	USA	Claire Hammill
22	MF	USA	Allie Post
23	DF	USA	Mikayla Mandleur
24	DF	USA	Madelyn O'Neill
28	MF	USA	Gabby Miller
30	DF	USA	Ava Brass
31	GK	USA	Cameron Kennett
32	FW	USA	Elliot Forney
33	MF	USA	Tehya Scheuten
45	DF	USA	Shannon Reiser
57	DF	USA	Riley Morris
73	FW	USA	Riley Tiernan
77	MF	CAN	Patricia Tsokos
88	MF	USA	Gabriela Gil

== Coaches ==
=== Current staff ===
Position	Name
Head coach	Mike O'Neill
Associate Head Coach	Lubos Ancin
Associate Head Coach	Madison Richard
Associate Head Coach	Ryan Nigro

=== All-time records ===
All-Time Coaching Records
Years	Coach	Records
1984–1999	Charles Duccilli	167–114–26 (.586)
2000–2013	Glenn Crooks	155–103–36 (.588)
2014–	Mike O'Neill	137–44–35 (.715)

== Year-by-year statistical leaders ==
Year-by-Year Statistical Leaders
Year	Goals Leader	G	Assists Leader	A
1984	Elyse Eichman-Dolan	15	Cindy Soffel	10
1985	Caroline Hallowell	11	Caroline Hallowell	7
1986	Heather Ladish	8	Beth Schimenti	7
1986	Beth Schimenti	8	Beth Schimenti	7
1987	Judy Kalafut	9	Lynn Hallowell	4
1987	Judy Kalafut	9	Judy Kalafut	4
1987	Judy Kalafut	9	Beth Schimenti	4
1987	Judy Kalafut	9	Julie Signorelli	4
1988	Kris Kurzynowski	15	Lynn Hallowell	10
1989	Kris Kurzynowski	13	Vicki Hoekstra	11
1990	Kris Kurzynowski	11	Jennifer Gibbons	8
1991	Christa Aluotto	13	Jennifer Gibbons	13
1992	Christa Aluotto	15	Beth Uydess	6
1993	Beth Uydess	11	Beth Uydess	5
1994	Valerie Duccilli	4	Valerie Duccilli	4
1994	Chrissy Sheerin	4	Valerie Duccilli	4
1995	Lisa Rabii	7	Valerie Duccilli	5
1995	Lisa Rabii	7	Kim Kamienski	5
1996	Gina Ressa	9	Maggie Moyer	6
1997	Shannon Nagle	11	Shannon Nagle	4
1997	Shannon Nagle	11	Tiphanie Wawrzyniak	4
1998	Uchenna Bright	4	Uchenna Bright	4
1998	Shannon Nagle	4	Uchenna Bright	4
1998	Jen Tobin	4	Uchenna Bright	4
1999	Alyssa Radu	5	Tiphanie Forst	4
2000	Keri Lages	9	Tiphanie Forst	3
2000	Keri Lages	9	Shannon Nagle	3
2001	Carli Lloyd	15	Erica Schubert	10
2002	Carli Lloyd	12	Carli Lloyd	7
2003	Carli Lloyd	13	Zoe Avner	2
2003	Carli Lloyd	13	Jaime Komar	2
2003	Carli Lloyd	13	Carli Lloyd	2
2003	Carli Lloyd	13	Christine Wentzler	2
2004	Carli Lloyd	10	Zoe Avner	2
2004	Carli Lloyd	10	Leia Rispoli	2
2005	Kristen Edmonds	6	Kristen Edmonds	6
2005	Domenique Esposito	6	Kristen Edmonds	6
2006	Alicia Hall	8	Gina DeMaio	8
2007	Gina DeMaio	5	Jenifer Anzivino	5
2008	Caycie Gusman	8	Gina DeMaio	13
2009	Ashley Jones	8	Stefanee Pace	6
2010	April Price	5	Gina DeMaio	5
2010	Karla Schacher	5	Gina DeMaio	5
2011	Jonelle Filigno	6	Jasmine Edwards	3
2011	Jonelle Filigno	6	Cassie Inacio	3
2012	Jonelle Filigno	15	Jonelle Filigno	5
2013	Stef Scholz	10	Madison Tiernan	5
2014	Stef Scholz	7	Madison Tiernan	3
2014	Stef Scholz	7	Amelia Pietrangelo	3
2014	Stef Scholz	7	Jessica Puchalski	3
2015	Colby Ciarrocca	9	Jennifer Andresen	4
2015	Colby Ciarrocca	9	Colby Ciarrocca	4
2015	Colby Ciarrocca	9	Samantha Valliant	4
2016	Madison Tiernan	11	Nicole Whitley	10
2017	Amirah Ali	6	Amirah Ali	5
2017	Colby Ciarrocca	6	Colby Ciarrocca	5
2017	Colby Ciarrocca	6	Kenie Wright	5
2018	Amirah Ali	10	Nicole Whitley	7
2019	Nneka Moneme	11	Taylor Aylmer	9
2020	Amirah Ali	7	Sara Brocious	3
2020	Amirah Ali	7	Becci Fluchel	3
2020	Amirah Ali	7	Sam Kroeger	3
2020	Amirah Ali	7	Allison Lowrey	3
2021	Frankie Tagliaferri	13	Riley Tiernan	13
2022	Sam Kroeger	7	Sara Brocious	7
2022	Allison Lowrey	7	Kylie Daigle	7
2023	Allison Lowrey	6	Allison Lowrey	4
2023	Allison Lowrey	6	Riley Tiernan	4
