= Sarah Woldmoe =

American professional soccer player (born 1992)

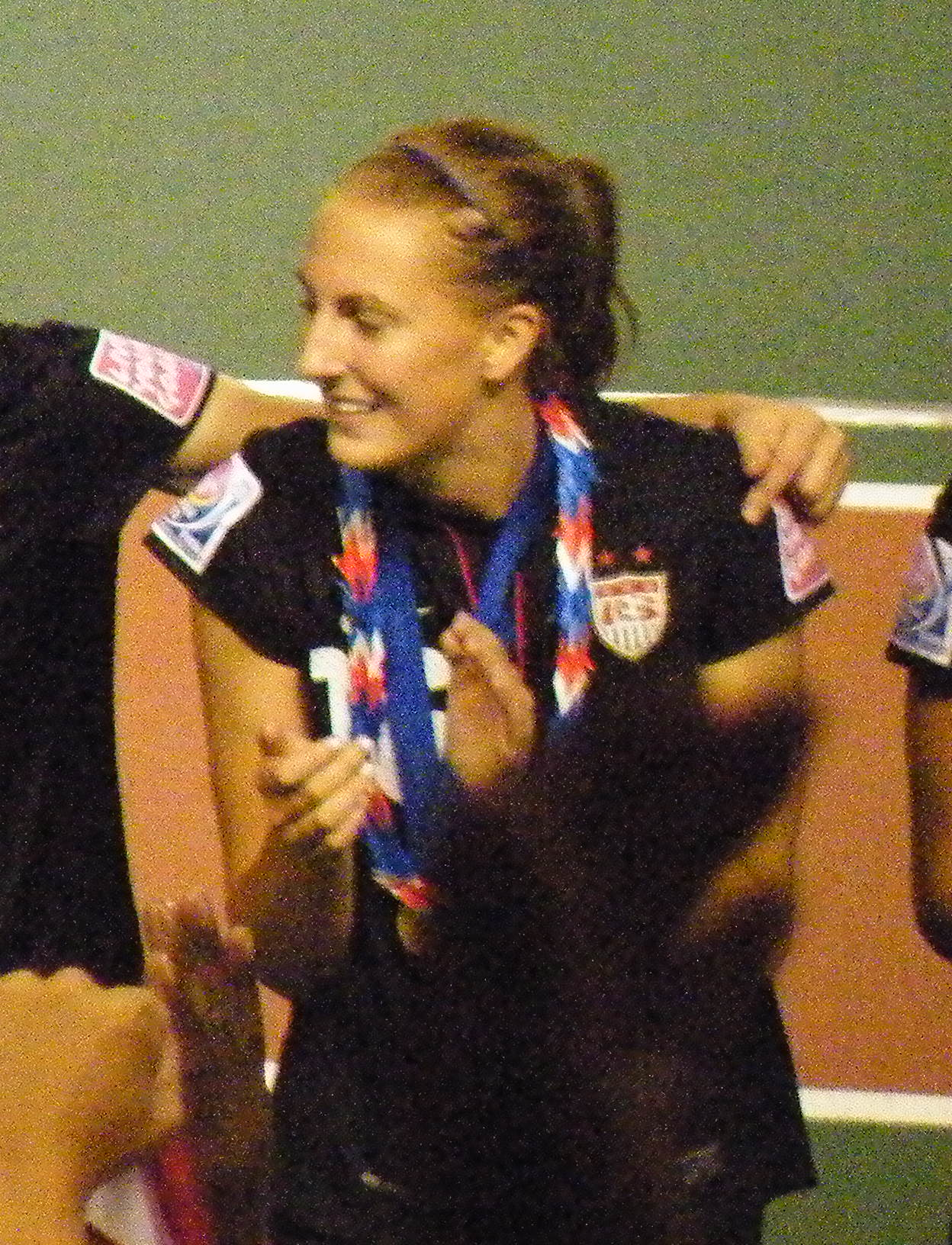
- Woldmoe at the U20 World Cup in 2012

Personal information
- Full name: Sarah Killion Woldmoe
- Birth name: Sarah Christine Killion
- Date of birth: July 27, 1992 (age 34)
- Place of birth: Fort Wayne, Indiana, United States
- Height: 5 ft 8 in (1.73 m)
- Position: Midfielder

College career
Years	Team	Apps	(Gls)
2011–2014	UCLA Bruins	88	(13)

Senior career*
Years	Team	Apps	(Gls)
2015–2020	Sky Blue FC	106	(11)
2015–2016	→ Adelaide United (loan)	12	(1)
2021–2022	Chicago Red Stars	21	(2)

International career^{‡}
2012	United States U20	9	(0)
2013–2015	United States U23		
- * Club domestic league appearances and goals as of October 16, 2021 ‡ National team caps and goals as of May 3, 2015

Sarah Killion Woldmoe (born Sarah Christine Killion; July 27, 1992) is an American former professional soccer player who played as a midfielder.

== Early life ==
Born and raised in Fort Wayne, Indiana, Woldmoe attended Bishop Dwenger High School where she played on the varsity soccer team for four years. Woldmoe was named Gatorade Player of the Year for the state of Indiana three times from 2009 to 2011. In 2010, she was named an ESPN RISE All-American and NSCAA Youth All-American; the latter for the second consecutive year. She was named NSCAA High School All-American in 2009 and 2010. Top Drawer Soccer rated her as the number 9 recruit in the country and top recruit from the state of Indiana. She finished her high school career with 63 goals and 73 assists. Woldmoe also played club soccer for the Fort Wayne Fever.

=== UCLA Bruins ===
Woldmoe chose to attend the University of California, Los Angeles (UCLA) and appeared in all 21 games for them her freshman season, starting in 11 of them. She assisted 2 goals, both to senior forward Sydney Leroux.

In 17 games (all starts) as a sophomore, Woldmoe recorded 6 assists and scored 3 goals of her own, two of which were game winners (vs. Oregon State and Colorado). She earned a selection to the All-Pac-12 team, as well as to the NSCAA All-Pacific Region first team and the Top Drawer Soccer National Team of the Season second team. Woldmoe also was named as an honorable mention on the Pac-12 All-Academic team.

Continuing a solid sophomore campaign, Woldmoe took off as a junior, scoring 1 goal and leading the Pac-12 in assists (12) while helping lead her team to the national championship game, where they defeated Florida State 1–0 in overtime to win their first ever NCAA Tournament championship. A starter in 25 out of the 26 games she played in, Woldmoe earned numerous awards and accolades, including selections to the All-Pac-12 team, College Cup All-Tournament team, Top Drawer Soccer Best XI, and NSCAA All-Pacific Region team. The LA Soccer News Player of the Year was also recognized on the Pac-12 All-Academic team, as well as on the NSCAA Scholar All-American and All-West Region teams and the Capital One Academic All-District second team.

The best individual season for Woldmoe came in 2014 as a senior. Accounting for 30 total points (at least 16 more than she recorded in any of her previous 3 seasons) in 24 games (all starts), Woldmoe finished her college career off with a 9-goal, 12-assist season, helping to lead her team to another College Cup. After being selected to the MAC Hermann Trophy Watch List, she made the Top Drawer Soccer Team of the Week three times and was named as the MVP of the Outrigger Resorts Soccer Classic after 1-goal/2-assist and 1-goal games against Hawaii and Pepperdine. She also set the UCLA record for assists in a game (3) against Loyola Marymount on September 21. For her senior-season performance, Woldmoe made the All-Pac 12 team, Top Drawer Soccer Best XI, NSCAA All-Pacific Region first team, and NSCAA All-American third team. Once again, Woldmoe was also honored greatly for her academic achievements, being named the Pac-12 Scholar of the Year and a Senior CLASS Award finalist and being selected to the Pac-12 All-Academic second team, NSCAA Scholar All-American and All-West Region first team, and Capital One Academic All-District second-team.

== Club career ==
=== Sky Blue FC, 2015–2020 ===
Woldmoe was selected second in the 2015 NWSL College Draft by Sky Blue FC. She made her debut for the club during the team's first match of the season against Houston Dash on April 19, 2015.

==== Adelaide United FC, 2015–2016 ====
Woldmoe joined Adelaide United from the Australian W-League for the 2015–16 season.

=== Chicago Red Stars, 2021–2022 ===
On December 29, 2020, it was announced that Woldmoe, along with teammate Mallory Pugh, would be traded to the Chicago Red Stars in exchange for three total first-round picks and an international slot for the 2021 and 2022 NWSL seasons.

She retired from soccer in December 2022.

== International career ==
Woldmoe has represented the United States at various youth levels. She was a starting player for United States under-20 women's national soccer team that won the FIFA U-20 Women's World Cup in 2012. She played for the United States under-23 national team at the 2013 Four Nations Tournament.

In February 2014, Woldmoe was named to the senior team roster by head coach Tom Sermanni for the 2014 Algarve Cup. Woldmoe received a call-up from coach Jill Ellis for January camp in 2017, she has not yet received a senior team cap.

== Personal life ==
She married her husband, Austin, in November 2019.

Woldmoe began using her married name in 2020.

It was announced on February 28, 2022, that she and her husband were expecting their first child. She gave birth to their son in August 2022.

== Career statistics ==
Club	Season	League			Cup		
Club	Season	League	Apps	Goals	Cup	Apps	Goals
Sky Blue FC	2015	NWSL	17	0	—	—	—
Sky Blue FC	2016	NWSL	18	3	—	—	—
Sky Blue FC	2017	NWSL	23	5	—	—	—
Sky Blue FC	2018	NWSL	11	0	—	—	—
Sky Blue FC	2019	NWSL	24	1	—	—	—
Sky Blue FC	2020	—			NWSL Challenge Cup	2	0
Sky Blue FC	2020	—			NWSL Fall Series	4	0
Sky Blue FC totals			93	9		6	0
Chicago Red Stars	2021	NWSL	21	2	NWSL Challenge Cup	4	0
Chicago Red Stars totals			21	2		4	0
Career totals			114	11		10	0

== Honors ==
=== Team ===
Winner

- FIFA U-20 Women's World Cup: 2012
- CONCACAF Women's U-20 Championship: 2012
- 2013 NCAA College Cup

=== Individual ===
==== Club ====
- 2017 NWSL Team of the Month (May)
- 2021 NWSL Player of the Week (Week 15)
