= Yurcak Field =

Soccer-specific stadium

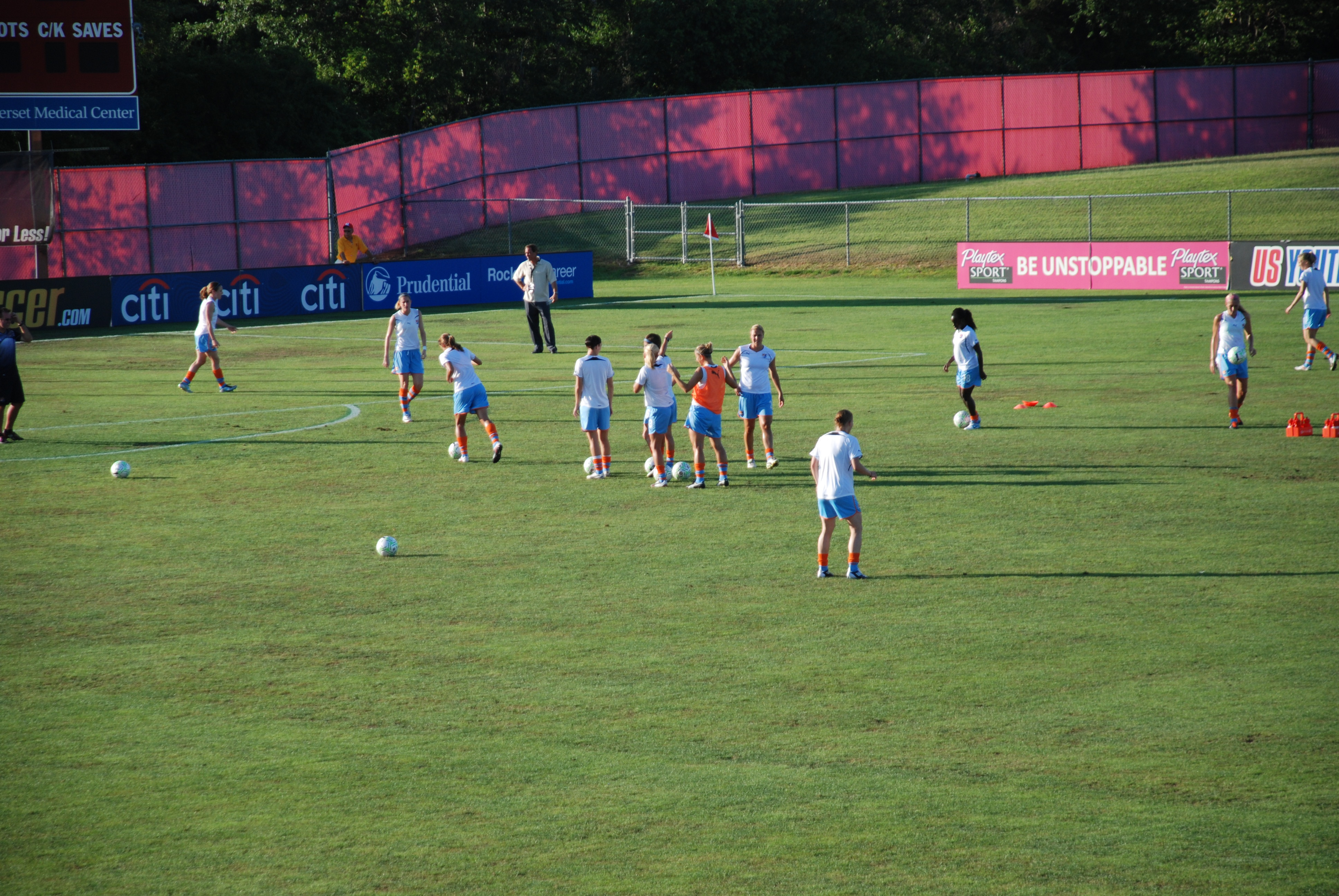
- Sky Blue FC players warm-up at the stadium in 2011
- Interactive map of Yurcak Field
- Full name: The Soccer Stadium at Yurcak Field
- Location: 83 Fitch Rd. Piscataway, New Jersey 08854
- Coordinates: 40°31′6.7224″N 74°27′49.3632″W
- Owner: Rutgers University–NB
- Operator: Rutgers University Athletics
- Capacity: 5,000
- Type: Stadium
- Surface: Kentucky bluegrass
- Record attendance: 5,103 (November 7, 2021)
- Field size: 120 yd × 75 yd (110 m × 69 m)
- Current use: Soccer

Construction
- Opened: April 16, 1994; 32 years ago
- Cost: $28 million + $102 million expansion

Tenants
- Rutgers Scarlet Knights (NCAA) teams: Men's soccer (1994–present); Women's soccer (1994–present); Men's lacrosse (1994–2013); Women's lacrosse (1994–2013); Professional teams: New Jersey Pride (MLL) (2006–2008); Gotham FC (WPS/NWSL) (2009–2011, 2013–2019)

Website
- scarletknights.com/yurcak-field

Yurcak Field is a 5,000 seat soccer-specific stadium on the main campus of Rutgers University–New Brunswick in Piscataway Township, New Jersey. Fully acknowledged as "The Soccer Stadium at Yurcak Field", it is named in honor of Ronald N. Yurcak, a 1965 All-American Rutgers Lacrosse player.

The stadium opened on April 16, 1994 and is currently used by the Rutgers Scarlet Knights men's and women's soccer teams.

== History ==
The stadium is the official home of the Rutgers Scarlet Knights men's and women's soccer teams. It was the home of Gotham FC of the National Women's Soccer League until 2019 and the Rutgers men's and women's lacrosse teams from 1994 until 2013 when the Scarlet Knights' lacrosse teams moved to nearby SHI Stadium.

In 1999, Yurcak Field hosted a third round match of the 1999 Lamar Hunt U.S. Open Cup between the Staten Island Vipers of the A-League and the MetroStars, now the New York Red Bulls, of Major League Soccer. In 2003, the stadium hosted two matches of the 2003 Lamar Hunt U.S. Open Cup. A quarter-final match between the New England Revolution and the MetroStars and a semi-final match between D.C. United and the MetroStars with the MetroStars winning both matches.

The facility has hosted the Division II & III NCAA Men's Lacrosse Championship games in 1998, 2001, and 2002. It was also the home the New Jersey Pride of Major League Lacrosse from 2006 through 2008.

In June 2015, it was announced that Yurcak Field would receive enhanced locker rooms, a new training room and new general office space in the coming years as part of a campus wide program to upgrade Rutgers athletic facilities. On April 13, 2019, a ground breaking was held for the Gary and Barbara Rodkin Academic Success Center. In January 2021, the 80,000 sq ft (7,400 m^{2}) Rodkin Center opened across Fitch Road from Yurcak Field providing new dedicated locker rooms and lounges, strength and conditioning areas, sports medicine facilities and office space for the men's and women's soccer teams and lacrosse teams. Two new practice soccer fields were also built as part of the Rodkin Center.

In March 2019, Yurcak Field underwent a surface renovation, as the pitch was replaced with Kentucky bluegrass, cut at 7/8 inch and placed on a sand base surface. The grass was provided by Tuckahoe Turf Farm in New Jersey.

Rutgers hosted the 2019 Big Ten Women's Soccer Tournament with the Semifinals and Final being played at Yurcak Field on November 8 & 10, 2019.

Rutgers hosted the 2021 Big Ten Women's Soccer Tournament with the Semifinals and Final being played at Yurcak Field on November 4 & 7, 2021. The championship game between Rutgers and Michigan set a new venue record with a total of 5,103.

Rutgers hosted the 2022 Big Ten men's soccer tournament with the Quarterfinals, Semifinals and Final being played at Yurcak Field on November 4, 9, & 13, 2022. Rutgers won the Big Ten Tournament Championship, its first, by defeating Indiana 3–1 in front of 4,203 fans.

In 2025, FC Porto had their base camp at Rutgers and Yurcak Field during the 2025 FIFA Club World Cup.

As part of the 2026 FIFA Men's World Cup, the Senegal national football team will hold their base camp at Rutgers and Yurcak Field.
