= Caity Heap =

American soccer player

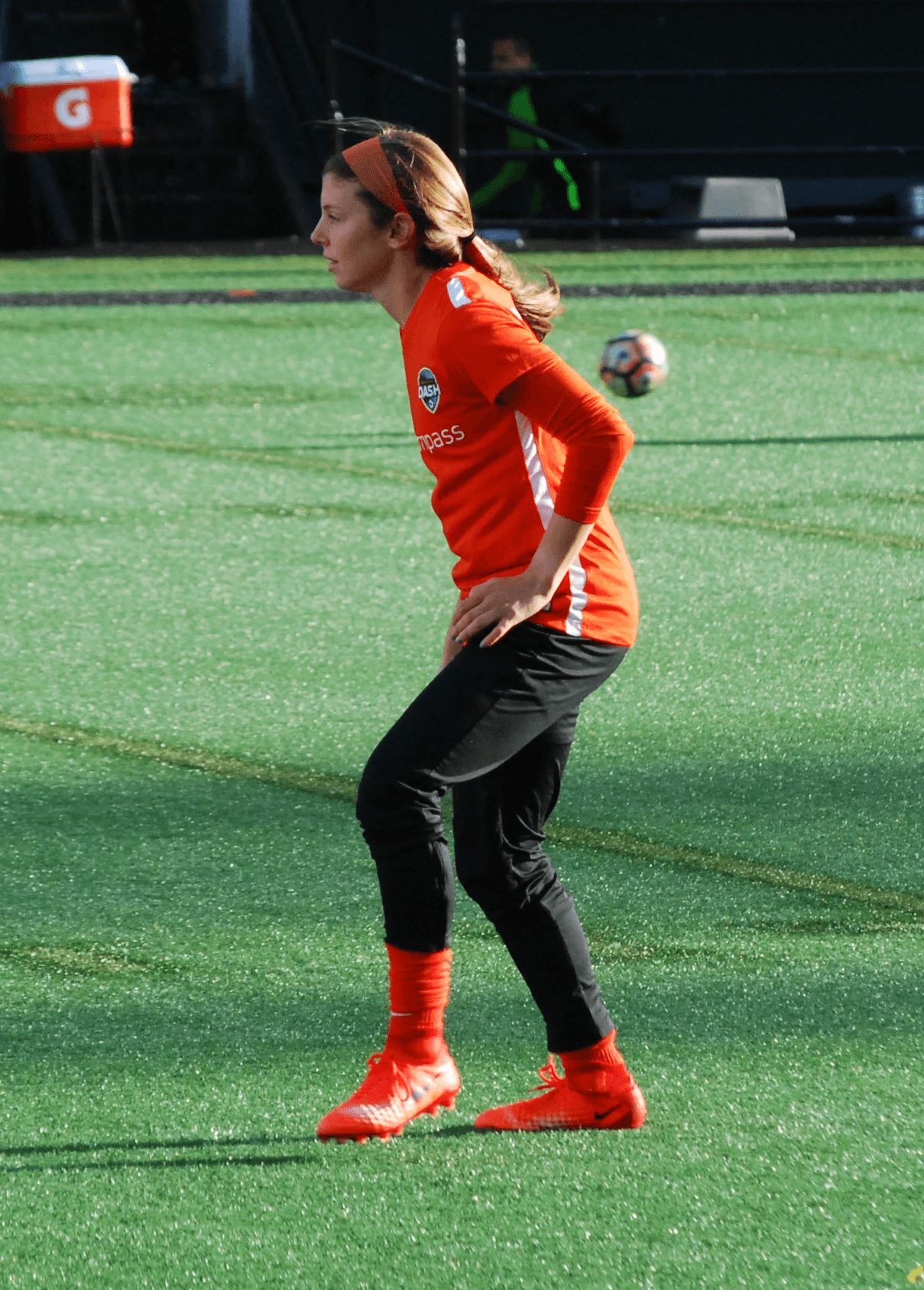
- Heap, April 2017

Personal information
- Full name: Caitlyn Josephine Heap
- Date of birth: August 10, 1994 (age 32)
- Place of birth: Tampa, Florida, United States
- Height: 5 ft 4 in (1.63 m)
- Position: Midfielder

College career
Years	Team	Apps	(Gls)
2012–2015	Texas Tech Red Raiders	80	(13)

Senior career*
Years	Team	Apps	(Gls)
2016–2017	Houston Dash	19	(0)
2018	Mallbackens IF	22	(3)
2019	Sparta Prague	4	(2)
2021	Selfoss	18	(4)
- * Club domestic league appearances and goals as of May 4, 2019

Caitlyn Josephine Heap (born August 10, 1994) is a former American soccer player.

== Playing career ==
=== Houston Dash, 2016–2017 ===
After attending a mini-camp for the Houston Dash, Heap was brought into the full preseason play where she did well enough to train and play with the first team, including starting four of five preseason games and scoring a goal against Baylor University. She was signed to a contract by the Dash at the start of the 2016 season, filling the Dash's final roster spot for the 2016 season.

"I'm really excited for Caity to sign her first professional contract with the Houston Dash. She is a player I've had my eye on since before the college draft," Dash head coach Randy Waldrum said. "Her college coach, Tom Stone at Texas Tech, kept me updated on her progress, and I was delighted when she became available for us." "It's a blessing. I've worked so hard for this and for Randy to give me the opportunity, I really appreciate that," Heap said. "I'm very excited for the season and it is really an honor to make the final roster."

Heap made her club debut during the season opener against the Chicago Red Stars. Heap started in the midfield on April 29 against Sky Blue FC. She was subbed off at halftime to give Denise O'Sullivan her club debut with the Dash. Heap made two other appearances for the Dash as a substitute.

In October 2016, Heap's contract was renewed for the 2017 season. Heap was waived by Houston in February 2018.

=== Mallbackens IF, 2018 ===
Heap subsequently joined Mallbackens IF in the Swedish Elitettan. While in Sweden she started 20 of her 22 games and scored 3 times, including twice in the last four games.

=== Sparta Prague, 2019 ===
In January 2019 Heap signed a 1.5 year pro contract with Czech team Sparta Praha. This contract will extend her stay with the Czech powerhouse until the end of the 2019–2020 season.
