= 2016 Houston Dash season =

Houston Dash
2016 season
- Managing Director: Brian Ching
- Head coach: Randy Waldrum
- Stadium: BBVA Compass Stadium
- NWSL: 8th
- NWSL Championship: Did not qualify
- Top goalscorer: Kealia Ohai (11)
- Highest home attendance: 7,440 (April 16 vs. Chicago)
- Lowest home attendance: 4,329 (July 30 vs. Western New York)
- Average home league attendance: 5,696
- Biggest win: 3–0 (July 16 vs. Portland); 4–1 (Sept. 11 vs. Boston)
- Biggest defeat: 0–3 (Sept. 7 at Portland)
Home colors	Away colors
- All statistics correct as of December 21, 2016.

The 2016 season is the Houston Dash's third season as an American professional women's soccer team in the NWSL.

== Club ==
=== Coaching staff ===
Position	Staff
Head Coach	(United States) Randy Waldrum
Assistant coach	(Brazil) Marcelo Galvao
Assistant coach	(United States) Hiro Suzuki
Goalkeeper coach	(United States) Tom Brown
Athletic Trainer	(United States) Kristy Chavez
Massage Therapist	(United States) Wes Speights

== First-team squad ==
Note: Flags indicate national team as defined under FIFA eligibility rules; some limited exceptions apply. Players may hold more than one non-FIFA nationality.

No.	Pos.	Nation	Player
1	GK	MEX	Bianca Henninger
2	DF	BRA	Poliana Barbosa Medeiros
3	FW	ENG	Rachel Daly
4	DF	USA	Rebecca Moros
5	DF	USA	Cari Roccaro
6	MF	USA	Morgan Brian
7	FW	USA	Kealia Ohai
9	FW	USA	Chioma Ubogagu
10	MF	USA	Carli Lloyd
11	FW	CAN	Janine Beckie

No.	Pos.	Nation	Player
12	FW	USA	Amber Brooks
13	DF	IRL	Denise O'Sullivan
15	DF	CAN	Allysha Chapman
17	MF	BRA	Andressa Machry
18	GK	AUS	Lydia Williams
21	FW	USA	Melissa Henderson
22	DF	USA	Stephanie Ochs
23	MF	USA	Cami Privett
24	DF	AUS	Ellie Brush
27	MF	USA	Caity Heap

== Standings and Match Results ==
=== Preseason ===
March 19 1	Houston Dash	4–2	Baylor Bears	Houston
3:00 p.m. CT	Daly, Heap; Beckie	Report	(?)	Stadium: Houston Sports Park
Note: Played in three 30-minute periods.

March 27 2	Oregon State Beavers	0–3	Houston Dash	Portland, Oregon
4:30 p.m. CT		Report	Beckie 13', 50'; Andressa 75'	Stadium: Providence Park

March 30 3	Seattle Reign FC	2–0	Houston Dash	Portland, Oregon
7:00 p.m. CT	Yanez 37'; Foxhoven (yellow card) 79'; Dallstream 82'	Report	Brooks (yellow card) 68'	Stadium: Providence Park

Apr 2 4	Portland Thorns FC	1-2	Houston Dash	Portland, Oregon
	Franch (yellow card) 27'; Berryhill (yellow card) 51'; Brynjarsdottir 79'		Beckie 83'; Brooks (yellow card) 86'; Ohai 90'	Stadium: Providence Park

April 8 4	Texas A&M Aggies	0–5	Houston Dash	College Station
8:00 p.m. CT		HOU Report; TAMU Report	Daly 14', 27'; Ubogagu 20', 88'; Brooks 35'	Stadium: Ellis Field; Attendance: 1,000+

=== Friendlies ===
Thurs June 2	FC Dallas WPSL	0–3	Houston Dash	Frisco
5:30 p.m. CT		Report		Stadium: Toyota Soccer Center Tundra Field #2

=== National Women's Soccer League ===
==== League standings ====
Pos	Team	Pld	W	D	L	GF	GA	GD	Pts	Qualification
1	Portland Thorns FC	20	12	5	3	35	19	+16	41	NWSL Shield
2	Washington Spirit	20	12	3	5	30	21	+9	39	NWSL Playoffs
3	Chicago Red Stars	20	9	6	5	24	20	+4	33	NWSL Playoffs
4	Western New York Flash (C)	20	9	5	6	40	26	+14	32	NWSL Playoffs
5	Seattle Reign FC	20	8	6	6	29	21	+8	30	
6	FC Kansas City	20	7	5	8	18	20	−2	26	
7	Sky Blue FC	20	7	5	8	24	30	−6	26	
8	Houston Dash	20	6	4	10	29	29	0	22	
9	Orlando Pride	20	6	1	13	20	30	−10	19	
10	Boston Breakers	20	3	2	15	14	47	−33	11	

Source: NWSL
Rules for classification: Tiebreakers
(C) Champions

Results summary

Overall								Home						Away					
Pld	W	D	L	GF	GA	GD	Pts	W	D	L	GF	GA	GD	W	D	L	GF	GA	GD
20	6	4	10	29	29	0	22	4	3	4	22	16	+6	2	1	6	7	13	−6

Last updated: September 25, 2016.
Source: National Women's Soccer League

Results by matchday

Matchday	1	2	3	4	5	6	7	8	9	10	11	12	13	14	15	16	17	18	19	20
Stadium	H	A	H	A	A	H	A	H	A	A	H	A	H	H	A	A	H	A	H	H
Result	W	L	D	W	L	L	L	L	L	L	W	D	D	L	D	W	W	L	W	L
Position (Note: Houston Dash's position in the league at the end of match day)	1	5	3	4	6	8	8	9	9	9	9	9	9	9	9	8	7	9	8	8

Updated to match(es) played on September 25, 2016. Source: HoustonDashSoccer.com
A = Away; H = Home; W = Win; D = Draw; L = Loss

==== Matches ====
April 16 1	Houston Dash	3–1	Chicago Red Stars	Houston
7:30 p.m. CT	Daly 22'; Lloyd 51' (Daly); Beckie 53' (Ohai)	Report	Press 13'	Stadium: BBVA Compass Stadium; Attendance: 7,440; Referee: Chris Spivey

April 23 2	Orlando Pride	3–1	Houston Dash	Orlando, Florida
6:30 p.m. CT	Andressa 46' (o.g.); Sanderson 57'; Morgan 61'	Report	Andressa 75'	Stadium: Camping World Stadium; Attendance: 23,403; Referee: Brandon Artis

April 29 3	Houston Dash	0–0	Sky Blue FC	Houston
7:30 p.m. CT		Report	Rodriguez (yellow card) 32'	Stadium: BBVA Compass Stadium; Attendance: 5,081; Referee: Reyna Fonseca

May 7 4	FC Kansas City	1–2	Houston Dash	Kansas City, Missouri
7:30 p.m. CT	Yael Averbuch 87'	Report	Daly (yellow card) 45'; O'Sullivan 69' (Ubogagu); Ubogagu 70' (Daly); Brush (yellow card) 82'	Stadium: Swope Soccer Village; Attendance: 3,282; Referee: Farhad Dadkho

May 14 5	Washington Spirit	1–0	Houston Dash	Boyds, Maryland
6:00 p.m. CT	Lohman 39' (Nairn); Kleiner (yellow card) 66'; Krieger (yellow card) 89'	Report		Stadium: Maryland SoccerPlex; Attendance: 3,545; Referee: Elvis Mahmutovic

May 20 6	Houston Dash	0–1	Orlando Pride	Houston
7:30 p.m. CT		Report; Report	Edmonds 81' (Sanderson)	Stadium: BBVA Compass Stadium; Attendance: 6,293; Referee: Greg Dopka

May 27	Houston Dash	PPD	Washington Spirit	Houston
7:30 p.m. CT		Announcement		Stadium: BBVA Compass Stadium
Note: rescheduled to August 18 due to inclement weather.

June 12 7	Seattle Reign FC	1–0	Houston Dash	Seattle, Washington
6:00 p.m. CT	Solaun 66' (Yanez)	Report		Stadium: Memorial Stadium; Attendance: 4,682; Referee: Marco Vega

June 19 8	Houston Dash	0–1	FC Kansas City	Houston, Texas
7:30 p.m. CT	Roccaro (yellow card) 89'	Report	Sauerbrunn 80'	Stadium: BBVA Compass Stadium; Attendance: 4,570; Referee: Matthew Franz

Thu June 23 9	Orlando Pride	1–0	Houston Dash	Orlando, Florida
6:30 p.m. CT	Spencer 92+' (Hagen)	Report		Stadium: Camping World Stadium; Attendance: 6,870; Referee: Marco Vega

July 9 10	Sky Blue FC	1–0	Houston Dash	Piscataway, New Jersey
6:00 p.m. CT	Lytle 54' (Killion); Kai (yellow card) 55'	Report		Stadium: Yurcak Field; Attendance: 1,732; Referee: Cuauhtemoc Delgadillo

July 16 11	Houston Dash	3–0	Portland Thorns FC	Houston
7:30 p.m.	Rachel Daly 7' (Kealia Ohai); Amber Brooks 68' (Becca Moros); Kealia Ohai 83' (unassisted)	Report	Mana Shim (yellow card) 40'; Hayley Raso (yellow card) 81'	Stadium: BBVA Compass Stadium; Attendance: 5,661; Referee: Danielle Chesky

July 23 12	Chicago Red Stars	1–1	Houston Dash	Bridgeview, Illinois
7:00 p.m.	Danielle Colaprico 3' (Vanessa DiBernardo)	Report	Megan Crosson (yellow card) 64'; Rachel Daly 82' (Kealia Ohai)	Stadium: Toyota Park; Attendance: 3,621; Referee: Levi Rippy

July 30 13	Houston Dash	3–3	Western New York Flash	Houston
7:30 p.m.	Rachel Daly 31' (unassisted); Kealia Ohai 47' (unassisted); Kealia Ohai 63' (Stephanie Ochs); Caity Heap (yellow card) 89'	Report	Lianne Sanderson 3' (Lynn Williams); Jessica McDonald 70' (Lynn Williams); Lynn Williams 90+3' (Jessica McDonald); Jaelene Hinkle (yellow card) 90+3'; Abby Dahlkemper (yellow card) 90+6'	Stadium: BBVA Compass Stadium; Attendance: 4,329; Referee: Matthew Franz

Thu August 18 14	Houston Dash	1–2	Washington Spirit	Houston
7:00 p.m. CT	Kealia Ohai 90' (Stephanie Ochs)	Report	Christine Nairn 30' (pen.), 63' (unassisted)	Stadium: BBVA Compass Stadium; Attendance: 5,012; Referee: Christina Unkel
Note: rescheduled from May 27

August 27 15	Houston Dash	2–2	Western New York Flash	Houston
6:00 p.m. CT	Denise O'Sullivan 28' (Janine Beckie) (yellow card) 41'; Kealia Ohai 34' (unasssited); Rachel Daly (yellow card) 86'	Report	Lianne Sanderson 36' (Lynn Williams); Makenzy Doniak 58' (L Williams)	Stadium: BBVA Compass Stadium; Attendance: 4,329; Referee: Matthew Franz

August 31 16	Boston Breakers	1–3	Houston Dash	Boston, Massachusetts
7:00 p.m. CT	Natasha Dowie 91+'	Report	Kealia Ohai 3' (C Lloyd), 33' (unassisted); Carli Lloyd 62'	Stadium: Jordan Field; Attendance: 3,762; Referee: Jasmine Peralta

September 3 17	Houston Dash	4–2	Orlando Pride	Houston
7:30 p.m. CT	Janine Beckie 24' (Carli Lloyd); Polina 49' (unassisted); Kealia Ohai 62' (unassisted), 95+' (J Becky); Cari Roccaro (yellow card) 76'; Amber Brooks (yellow card) 79'	Report	Alex Morgan 80' (K Edmonds) (yellow card) 78'; Kristen Edmonds 87' (unassisted)	Stadium: BBVA Compass Stadium; Attendance: 6,819; Referee: Ekaterina Koroleva

September 7 18	Portland Thorns FC	3–0	Houston Dash	Portland, Oregon
9:00 p.m. CT	Allie Long 26' (Tobin Heath), 71' (T Heath); Christine Sinclair 90'	Report		Stadium: Providence Park; Attendance: 13,752; Referee: Brandon Artis

September 11 19	Houston Dash	4–1	Boston Breakers	Houston
6:00 p.m. CT	Janine Beckie 26' (Carli Lloyd); Kealia Ohai 35' (Janine Beckie); Andressa Machry (yellow card) 55'; Carli Lloyd 78' (Kealia Ohai); Carli Lloyd 81' (penalty)	Report	Elise Krieghoff 76' (unassisted)	Stadium: BBVA Compass Stadium; Attendance: 6,107; Referee: Levi Rippy

September 25 20	Houston Dash	2–3	Seattle Reign FC	Houston
8:30 p.m. CT	Kealia Ohai 39' (unassisted); Carli Lloyd 42' (Denise O'Sullivan)	Report	Merritt Mathias (yellow card) 13'; Manon Melis 60' (Jessica Fishlock); Kim Little 76' (Jessica Fishlock); Beverly Yanez 82' (Carson Pickett)	Stadium: BBVA Compass Stadium; Attendance: 5,651; Referee: Farhad Dadkho

== Awards ==
=== NWSL Yearly Awards ===
==== NWSL Team of the Year ====
Team	Position	Player	Ref.
Best XI	Forward	(United States) Kealia Ohai	

=== NWSL Weekly Awards ===
==== NWSL Player of the Week ====
Week	Result	Player	Ref.
1	Won	(England) Rachel Daly	
4	Won	(England) Chioma Ubogagu	
15	Won	(United States) Kealia Ohai	
17	Won	(United States) Kealia Ohai	

==== NWSL Goal of the Week ====
Week	Result	Player	Ref.
14	Won	(England) Rachel Daly	
15	Won	(England) Rachel Daly	
19	Won	(United States) Kealia Ohai	

==== NWSL Save of the Week ====
Week	Result	Player	Ref.
5	Won	(Australia) Lydia Williams	
19	Won	(Australia) Lydia Williams	

== Squad statistics ==
Source: NWSL

N	Pos	Player	GP	GS	Min	G	A	PK	Shot	SOG	SOG%	Cro	CK	Off	Foul	FS	YC	RC
2	DF	Poliana Barbosa	15	15	1324	1	0	0	15	9	60%	1	2	3	10	4	1	0
11	FW	Janine Beckie	14	11	916	3	2	0	19	7	37%	4	1	7	3	5	0	0
6	MF	Morgan Brian	13	13	1001	0	0	0	8	3	38%	0	16	2	5	11	0	0
12	MF	Amber Brooks	19	11	1084	1	0	0	10	2	20%	0	0	1	20	7	1	0
24	DF	Ellie Brush	15	15	1340	0	0	0	1	1	100%	0	0	0	12	7	4	0
15	DF	Allysha Chapman	9	8	710	0	0	0	2	1	50%	0	0	0	4	6	1	0
25	MF	Megan Crosson	4	1	114	0	0	0	1	1	100%	0	11	0	1	2	1	0
3	FW	Rachel Daly	16	12	1186	4	4	0	41	16	39%	2	1	19	20	16	2	0
19	MF	Tessa Florio-Gavilsky	3	0	55	0	0	0	2	0	0%	0	0	1	1	2	0	0
27	MF	Caity Heap	6	2	127	0	0	0	2	0	0%	0	0	0	3	3	2	0
21	FW	Melissa Henderson	7	4	321	0	0	0	0	0	—	0	8	2	5	4	0	0
1	GK	Bianca Henninger	5	5	450	0	0	0	0	0	—	0	0	0	0	1	0	0
10	MF	Carli Lloyd	7	7	553	5	3	1	27	10	37%	0	3	7	6	4	0	0
17	MF	Andressa Machry	15	15	1298	1	1	0	22	7	32%	3	37	0	12	26	1	0
4	DF	Becca Moros	17	17	1520	0	3	0	4	2	50%	0	1	0	13	7	0	0
13	MF	Denise O'Sullivan	18	14	1315	2	5	0	26	11	42%	0	1	2	16	14	1	0
22	DF	Stephanie Ochs	12	3	385	0	2	0	7	3	43%	2	8	3	3	3	0	0
7	FW	Kealia Ohai	20	18	1622	11	4	0	51	31	61%	6	1	31	8	10	0	0
23	MF	Cami Privett	15	11	1059	0	0	0	4	2	50%	0	0	0	8	8	1	0
5	DF	Cari Roccaro	15	14	1264	0	0	0	0	0	—	0	1	0	6	3	2	0
9	FW	Chioma Ubogagu	15	9	806	1	1	0	23	9	39%	3	0	9	9	6	0	0
18	GK	Lydia Williams	15	15	1350	0	0	0	0	0	—	0	1	0	0	1	0	0
Team Total			20	—	19800	29	23	1	265	115	43%	21	92	87	165	150	17	0

N	Pos	Goal keeper	GP	GS	Min	GA	GA/G	PKA	PKF	Shot	SOG	Sav	Sav%	YC	RC
1	GK	Bianca Henninger	5	5	450	7	1.40	1	1	61	22	14	64%	0	0
18	GK	Lydia Williams	15	15	1350	22	1.47	1	1	175	83	62	75%	0	0
Team Total			20	—	1800	29	1.45	2	2	236	105	76	72%	0	0
