= 2017 Houston Dash season =

Houston Dash
2017 season
- Managing Director: Brian Ching
- Head coach: Randy Waldrum (until May 29, 2017); Omar Morales (interim)
- Stadium: BBVA Compass Stadium
- Top goalscorer: Rachel Daly & Poliana (3)
- Highest home attendance: 6,095 (June 29 vs. Boston)
- Lowest home attendance: 4,484 (Apr. 15 vs. Chicago)
- Average home league attendance: 5,436
| Home colors | Away colors |

The 2017 Houston Dash season was the team's fourth season as an American professional women's soccer team in the National Women's Soccer League.

== Team information ==
=== Rosters ===
Players and squad numbers last updated on June 17, 2017.
Note: Flags indicate national team as has been defined under FIFA eligibility rules. Players may hold more than one non-FIFA nationality.

| No. | Name | Country | Position | Date of birth (age) |
Goalkeepers
| 18 | Lydia Williams | Australia | GK | May 13, 1988 (age 38) |
| 24 | Jane Campbell | United States | GK | February 17, 1995 (age 31) |
Defenders
| 2 | Poliana Barbosa Medeiros | Brazil | DF | February 6, 1991 (age 35) |
| 4 | Bruna Benites | Brazil | DF | October 16, 1985 (age 40) |
| 5 | Cari Roccaro | United States | DF | July 18, 1994 (age 32) |
| 22 | Camille Levin | United States | DF | April 24, 1990 (age 36) |
| 23 | Cami Privett | United States | DF | March 16, 1990 (age 36) |
| 55 | Janine van Wyk | South Africa | DF | April 17, 1987 (age 39) |
Midfielders
| 6 | Morgan Brian | United States | MF | February 26, 1993 (age 33) |
| 8 | Claire Falknor | United States | MF | May 12, 1993 (age 33) |
| 10 | Carli Lloyd | United States | MF | July 16, 1982 (age 44) |
| 12 | Amber Brooks | United States | MF | January 23, 1991 (age 35) |
| 13 | Denise O'Sullivan | Ireland | MF | February 4, 1994 (age 32) |
| 17 | Andressa Cavalari Machry | Brazil | MF | May 1, 1995 (age 31) |
| 27 | Caity Heap | United States | MF | August 10, 1994 (age 32) |
Forwards
| 3 | Rachel Daly | England | FW | December 6, 1991 (age 34) |
| 7 | Kealia Ohai | United States | FW | January 31, 1992 (age 34) |
| 9 | Sarah Hagen | United States | FW | December 6, 1991 (age 34) |
| 14 | Nichelle Prince | Canada | FW | February 19, 1995 (age 31) |
| 16 | Janine Beckie | Canada | FW | August 20, 1994 (age 32) |

== Pre-season and friendlies ==
| March 19, 2017 Friendly | Houston Dash | 2–0 | Baylor University | Plano, Texas |
| 17:00 PT | Ohai 44'; Munerlyn 50' | Report | | Stadium: Prestonwood Lions Stadium |

| March 29, 2017 Thorns Invitational | U.S. U-23s WNT | 1–2 | Houston Dash | Portland, Oregon |
| 17:00 PT | Savannah McCaskill 74' | Report | Bruna Benites 89'; Amber Brooks 90+4' | Stadium: Providence Park; Referee: Jason Perlewitz |

| March 26, 2017 Thorns Invitational | Chicago Red Stars | 2–1 | Houston Dash | Portland, Oregon |
| 19:00 PT | Christen Press 41' (pen.), 84' | Report | Melissa Henderson 82' (pen.) | Stadium: Providence Park; Referee: Jason Perlewitz |

| April 1, 2017 Thorns Invitational | Portland Thorns FC | 1–1 | Houston Dash | Portland, Oregon |
| 19:30 PT | Meleana Shim 17' | Report | Rachel Daly 76' | Stadium: Providence Park; Attendance: 7,252 |

| April 6, 2017 Friendly | Texas A&M Aggies | 1–2 | Houston Dash | College Station, Texas |
| 20:00 PT | Briana Alston 17' | Report | Amber Brooks 12'; Rachel Daly 80' | Stadium: Ellis Field |

== Competitions ==
=== NWSL ===
==== League standings ====
| Pos | Team | Pld | W | D | L | GF | GA | GD | Pts | Qualification |
|---|---|---|---|---|---|---|---|---|---|---|
| 1 | North Carolina Courage | 24 | 16 | 1 | 7 | 38 | 22 | +16 | 49 | NWSL Shield |
| 2 | Portland Thorns FC (C) | 24 | 14 | 5 | 5 | 37 | 20 | +17 | 47 | NWSL Playoffs |
| 3 | Orlando Pride | 24 | 11 | 7 | 6 | 45 | 31 | +14 | 40 | NWSL Playoffs |
| 4 | Chicago Red Stars | 24 | 11 | 6 | 7 | 33 | 30 | +3 | 39 | NWSL Playoffs |
| 5 | Seattle Reign FC | 24 | 9 | 7 | 8 | 43 | 37 | +6 | 34 | |
| 6 | Sky Blue FC | 24 | 10 | 3 | 11 | 42 | 51 | −9 | 33 | |
| 7 | FC Kansas City | 24 | 8 | 7 | 9 | 29 | 31 | −2 | 31 | |
| 8 | Houston Dash | 24 | 7 | 3 | 14 | 23 | 39 | −16 | 24 | |
| 9 | Boston Breakers | 24 | 4 | 7 | 13 | 24 | 35 | −11 | 19 | |
| 10 | Washington Spirit | 24 | 5 | 4 | 15 | 30 | 48 | −18 | 19 | |

Source: NWSL
Rules for classification: Tiebreakers
(C) Champions

==== Results by round ====
| Round | 1 | 2 | 3 | 4 | 5 | 6 | 7 | 8 | 9 | 10 | 11 | 12 | 13 | 14 | 15 | 16 | 17 | 18 | 19 | 20 | 21 | 22 | 23 | 24 |
|---|---|---|---|---|---|---|---|---|---|---|---|---|---|---|---|---|---|---|---|---|---|---|---|---|
| Stadium | H | A | A | A | H | A | H | A | H | A | H | A | H | H | H | A | H | A | A | H | H | A | H | A |
| Result | W | L | W | L | L | L | L | L | L | W | D | W | D | W | W | L | L | W | L | L | L | L | L | L |
| Position | 1 | 3 | 4 | 4 | 7 | 9 | 9 | 10 | 10 | 10 | 10 | 7 | 7 | 7 | 5 | 7 | 7 | 7 | | | | | | 8 |

Updated to match(es) played on August 16, 2017. Source: Competitive matches
A = Away; H = Home; W = Win; D = Draw; L = Loss

==== Matches ====
| April 15, 2017 1 | Houston Dash | 2–0 | Chicago Red Stars | Houston, Texas |
| 13:00 CDT | Ohai 15' (Brooks); Benites (yellow card) 56'; Daly 80' (Ohai) | Report | Mautz (yellow card) 29' | Stadium: BBVA Compass Stadium; Attendance: 4,484; Referee: Farhad Dadkho |

| April 22, 2017 2 | Seattle Reign FC | 5–1 | Houston Dash | Seattle, Washington |
| 21:00 CDT | Fishlock 18' (Nairn); Rapinoe 27' (Fishlock); McNabb 31'; Yanez 55'; Johnson 74'; Corsie (yellow card) 83' | Report | Poliana 84' | Stadium: Memorial Stadium; Attendance: 2,727; Referee: Marco Vega |

| April 29, 2017 3 | Washington Spirit | 0–1 | Houston Dash | Boyds, Maryland |
| 18:00 CDT | | Report | Ohai 28' (O'Sullivan); Benites (yellow card) 59' | Stadium: Maureen Hendricks Field, Maryland SoccerPlex; Attendance: 3,154; Referee: Christina Unkel |

| May 6, 2017 4 | Chicago Red Stars | 2–0 | Houston Dash | Bridgeview, Illinois |
| 15:00 CDT | Hagen 44' (o.g.); Ertz 61'; Press (yellow card) 82' | Report | Benites (yellow card) 14' | Stadium: Toyota Park; Attendance: 2,114; Referee: Ekaterina Koroleva |

| May 13, 2017 5 | Houston Dash | 1–3 | Sky Blue FC | Houston, Texas |
| 15:00 CDT | Poliana 76' (Ohai); Brooks (yellow card) 87' | Report | Kerr (yellow card) 17' (goal) 87' (Meehan); Killion 33' (pen.); Galton 53' (Kerr); Rodriguez (yellow card) 65' | Stadium: BBVA Compass Stadium; Attendance: 5,369; Referee: Michael Radchuk |

| May 20, 2017 6 | Sky Blue FC | 2–1 | Houston Dash | Piscataway, New Jersey |
| 15:00 CDT | Killion 20' (pen.); Rodríguez 85'; Tiernan (yellow card) 89' | Report | Daly (yellow card) 21'; Andressa 40'; Privett (yellow card) 84' | Stadium: Yurcak Field; Attendance: 2,476; Referee: Christina Unkel |

| May 27, 2017 7 | Houston Dash | 0–2 | Seattle Reign FC | Houston, Texas |
| 15:00 CDT | | Report | Roccaro 30' (o.g.); Johnson 64' (Kawasumi) | Stadium: BBVA Compass Stadium; Attendance: 5,312; Referee: Karen Abt |

| June 3, 2017 8 | Washington Spirit | 2–0 | Houston Dash | Boyds, Maryland |
| 18:00 CDT | Williams 3' (Solaun); Pugh 69' (Mewis) | Report | Amber Brooks (yellow card) 63' | Stadium: Maureen Hendricks Field; Attendance: 3,096; Referee: Victor Rivas |

| June 17, 2017 9 | Houston Dash | 2–4 | Orlando Pride | Houston, Texas |
| 19:30 CDT | Beckie (yellow card) 64'; Van Wyk (yellow card) 80'; Poliana 89' (Andressa); Prince 90+6' (Andressa) | Report | Camila 16' (Marta); Marta 22', 57' (Spencer); Camila (yellow card) 65'; Kennedy 68' (Marta) | Stadium: BBVA Compass Stadium; Attendance: 5,918; Referee: Rebecca Pagan |

| June 24, 2017 10 | Orlando Pride | 0–2 | Houston Dash | Orlando, Florida |
| 14:50 CT | | Report | Van Wyk (yellow card) 43'; Lloyd 45+4' (Poliana); Daly 62' (Poliana) | Stadium: Orlando City Stadium; Attendance: 5,497; Referee: Marco Vega |

| June 28, 2017 11 | Houston Dash | 0–0 | Boston Breakers | Houston, Texas |
| 19:30 CT | | Report | Andrews (yellow card) 25'; Chapman (yellow card) 58' | Stadium: BBVA Compass Stadium; Attendance: 6,095; Referee: Kevin Broadley |

| July 2, 2017 12 | FC Kansas City | 1–2 | Houston Dash | Kansas City, Missouri |
| 19:00 CT | LaBonta (yellow card) 35' (yellow-red card) 62'; Groom 45+1' (Gibbons); Gibbons (yellow card) 52' | Report | Lloyd (yellow card) 52'; Daly 55'; Prince 64' (Brooks) | Stadium: Children's Mercy Victory Field; Attendance: 1,703; Referee: Karen Abt |

| July 8, 2017 13 | Houston Dash | 1–1 | Portland Thorns FC | Houston, Texas |
| 21:00 CT | Beckie 8' (Daly); Benites (yellow card) 82'; Daly (yellow card) 90'; Lloyd (red card) 90+1' | Report | Horan (yellow card) 45+2', (goal) 90+1' | Stadium: BBVA Compass Stadium; Attendance: 3,869; Referee: Christina Unkel |
Note: Kickoff was delayed from 19:30 Central due to severe weather.

| July 15, 2017 14 | Houston Dash | 2–1 | Washington Spirit | Houston, Texas |
| 19:30 CT | Poliana 25' (Beckie); Andressa 53' (Daly); Van Wyk (yellow card) 59' | Report | Johnson 75' (Solaun) | Stadium: BBVA Compass Stadium; Attendance: 3,332; Referee: Chris Spivey |

| July 22, 2017 15 | Houston Dash | 1–0 | Boston Breakers | Houston, Texas |
| 19:30 CT | Prince 23' (Andressa) | Report | | Stadium: BBVA Compass Stadium; Attendance: 5,337; Referee: Reyna Fonseca |

| August 5, 2017 16 | Portland Thorns FC | 2–1 | Houston Dash | Portland, Oregon |
| 15:00 CT | Sonnett 12' (Lussi); Lussi 39' | Report | Heap (yellow card) 22'; Lloyd 33' (pen.) (yellow card) 40' | Stadium: Providence Park; Attendance: 18,243; Referee: Karen Abt |

| August 13, 2017 17 | Houston Dash | 0–1 | FC Kansas City | Houston, Texas |
| 19:30 CT | Brooks (yellow card) 63' | Report | Groom 83' (Sauerbrunn) | Stadium: BBVA Compass Stadium; Attendance: 4,352; Referee: Robi Hullner |

| August 16, 2017 18 | Boston Breakers | 1–3 | Houston Dash | Boston, Massachusetts |
| 18:30 CT | Dowie 26' (Purce); Smith (yellow card) 45+1'; Oyster (yellow card) 90+3' | Report | Hagen 10', 79'; Beckie 64' (Prince) | Stadium: Jordan Field; Attendance: 3,003; Referee: Matthew Franz |

| August 19, 2017 19 | Portland Thorns FC | 2–0 | Houston Dash | Portland, Oregon |
| 21:00 CT | Horan 14' (Klingenberg); Brynjarsdottir (yellow card) 32'; Henry 48' (Nadim); Sinclair (yellow card) 70'; Sonnett (yellow card) 79' | Report | Beckie (yellow card) 60'; Daly (yellow card) 73' (red card) 79'; Roccaro (yellow card) 74'; Levin (yellow card) 76' | Stadium: Providence Park; Attendance: 19,672; Referee: Karen Abt |

| September 27, 2017 20 | Houston Dash | 0–4 | North Carolina Courage | Edinburg, Texas |
| 19:00 CT | | Report | Mewis 13' (Dahlkemper); Williams 38' (Hatch); Debinha 51' (Williams); Hatch 56' (Debinha) | Stadium: H-E-B Park; Attendance: 2,905; Referee: Michael Radchuk |

| September 3, 2017 21 | Houston Dash | 0–1 | Seattle Reign FC | Frisco, Texas |
| 19:00 CT | Benites (yellow card) 88' | Report | Mathias 53' (Yanez); Barnes (yellow card) 77'; Fishlock (yellow card) 80' | Stadium: Toyota Stadium; Attendance: 1,258; Referee: Rosendo Mendoza |

| September 9, 2017 22 | North Carolina Courage | 1–0 | Houston Dash | Cary, North Carolina |
| 18:30 CT | Dahlkemper (yellow card) 63'; Hamilton 26' (Erceg) | Report | Roccaro (yellow card) 64'; Van Wyk (yellow card) 90+7' | Stadium: Sahlen's Stadium; Attendance: 4,702; Referee: Karen Abt |

| September 23, 2017 23 | Houston Dash | 2–3 | Chicago Red Stars | Houston, Texas |
| 15:00 CT | Brooks 24' (pen.); Andresshina (yellow card) 75'; Daly 85' (Mewis) | Report | Hoy 12'; Short 20'; Press 45+2' (pen.); Nagasato (red card) 89' | Stadium: BBVA Compass Stadium; Attendance: 6,707; Referee: Marco Vega |

| September 29, 2017 24 | FC Kansas City | 1–1 | Houston Dash | Kansas City, Missouri |
| 19:00 CT | Kelly 9' (Scott) (yellow card) 63'; Groom (yellow card) 71' | Report | Benites (yellow card) 48'; Roccaro (yellow card) 51'; Daly 53' (Mewis) | Stadium: Children's Mercy Victory Field; Attendance: 1,312; Referee: Lukasz Szpala |

== Statistics ==
=== Appearances ===
| No. | Pos | Nat | Player | NWSL | | | | |
| No. | Pos | Nat | Player | Apps | Goals | Booked | (yellow card) (yellow-red card) | Sent off (straight red) |
Goalkeepers
| 18 | GK | (Australia) | Lydia Williams | 7 | 0 | 0 | 0 | 0 |
| 24 | GK | (United States) | Jane Campbell | 1 | 0 | 0 | 0 | 0 |
Defenders
| 2 | DF | (Brazil) | Poliana Barbosa Medeiros | 3+5 | 2 | 0 | 0 | 0 |
| 4 | DF | (Brazil) | Bruna Benites | 5 | 0 | 3 | 0 | 0 |
| 5 | DF | (United States) | Cari Roccaro | 8 | 0 | 0 | 0 | 0 |
| 22 | DF | (United States) | Camille Levin | 6 | 0 | 0 | 0 | 0 |
| 23 | DF | (United States) | Cami Privett | 2+2 | 0 | 1 | 0 | 0 |
| 55 | DF | (South Africa) | Janine van Wyk | 4 | 0 | 0 | 0 | 0 |
Midfielders
| 6 | MF | (United States) | Morgan Brian | 4+1 | 0 | 0 | 0 | 0 |
| 12 | MF | (United States) | Amber Brooks | 8 | 0 | 2 | 0 | 0 |
| 13 | MF | (Republic of Ireland) | Denise O'Sullivan | 5+2 | 0 | 0 | 0 | 0 |
| 16 | MF | (Canada) | Janine Beckie | 8 | 0 | 0 | 0 | 0 |
| 17 | MF | (Brazil) | Andressa Cavalari Machry | 4+1 | 1 | 0 | 0 | 0 |
| 27 | MF | (United States) | Caity Heap | 0+3 | 0 | 0 | 0 | 0 |
Forwards
| 3 | FW | (England) | Rachel Daly | 8 | 1 | 0 | 0 | 0 |
| 7 | FW | (United States) | Kealia Ohai | 8 | 2 | 0 | 0 | 0 |
| 9 | FW | (United States) | Sarah Hagen | 2+5 | 0 | 0 | 0 | 0 |
| 14 | FW | (Canada) | Nichelle Prince | 4+3 | 0 | 0 | 0 | 0 |
| 21 | FW | (United States) | Melissa Henderson | 0+1 | 0 | 0 | 0 | 0 |

Last updated: June 3, 2017.
Source: Competitive matches

=== Goalscorers ===
| Rank | No. | Pos | Nat | Name | NWSL |
|---|---|---|---|---|---|
| 1 | 2 | DF | (Brazil) | Poliana | 3 |
| 1 | 3 | FW | (England) | Rachel Daly | 3 |
| 3 | 7 | FW | (United States) | Kealia Ohai | 2 |
| 3 | 14 | FW | (Canada) | Nichelle Prince | 2 |
| 5 | 17 | MF | (Brazil) | Andressa Cavalari Machry | 1 |
| Totals | | | | | 10 |

Last updated: June 28, 2017

== Player transactions ==
=== Retirements ===
| Date | Player | Positions Played | Ref |
|---|---|---|---|
| June 14, 2017 | (United States) Melissa Henderson | FW | |

== Honors and awards ==
=== NWSL Monthly Awards ===
==== NWSL Player of the Month ====
| Month | Result | Player | Ref |
|---|---|---|---|
| June | Won | (England) Rachel Daly | |

==== NWSL Team of the Month ====
| Month | Goalkeeper | Defenders | Midfielders | Forwards | Ref. |
|---|---|---|---|---|---|
| April | | | | (United States) Kealia Ohai | |
| July | (United States) Jane Campbell | (United States) Amber Brooks | (Brazil) Andressinha | | |

=== NWSL Weekly Awards ===
==== NWSL Player of the Week ====
| Week | Result | Player | Ref |
|---|---|---|---|
| 10 | Won | (Brazil) Poliana | |
| 13 | Won | (Brazil) Andressinha | |

==== NWSL Save of the Week ====
| Week | Result | Player | Ref. |
|---|---|---|---|
| 19 | Nominated | (United States) Jane Campbell | |

==== NWSL Goal of the Week ====
| Week | Result | Player | Ref. |
|---|---|---|---|
| 1 | Won | (England) Rachel Daly | |
| 21 | Won | (England) Rachel Daly | |
