= Megan Crosson =

American soccer defender

Personal information
- Full name: Megan Lorraine Crosson
- Date of birth: May 13, 1994 (age 32)
- Place of birth: Costa Mesa, California, United States
- Height: 5 ft 9 in (1.75 m)
- Position: Defender

Youth career
- Mater Dei High School
- Southern California Blues

College career
Years	Team	Apps	(Gls)
2012–2015	Santa Clara Broncos	60	(0)

Senior career*
Years	Team	Apps	(Gls)
2016–2017	Houston Dash	4	(0)
2016	Speranza FC	7	(0)
2017–2018	UDG Tenerife	22	(0)
2018	Washington Spirit	1	(0)
2018	Gintra Universitetas	4	(0)
2019	Washington Spirit	6	(1)
2020	Houston Dash	0	(0)
2020	Celtic	0	(0)
- * Club domestic league appearances and goals

Megan Lorraine Crosson (born May 13, 1994) is an American soccer defender. She previously played for the Houston Dash and Washington Spirit of the National Women's Soccer League.

== Club career ==
=== Houston Dash ===
Crosson attended Santa Clara University, where she played for the Santa Clara Broncos from 2012 to 2015. She recorded a total of 60 appearances with nine assistances. She signed with the Houston Dash in March 2016 and made four appearances for the club during the 2016 season. She trained with the team during the 2017 preseason, but was not offered a contract for the 2017 season.

=== Speranza FC ===
Looking for more playing time after playing with Houston Dash in 2016, Crosson played abroad with Speranza FC in Japan's Nadeshiko League Division 1 for four months. Though a defender, she played seven games as a forward.

=== UD Granadilla Tenerife ===
In 2017, Crosson was signed as a defender to UDG Tenerife in Spain's Liga Iberdrola. She officially joined the team on 17 August.

=== Washington Spirit ===
In August 2018, Crosson was temporarily signed as a replacement player to the Washington Spirit in the NWSL, making an appearance in the final match of the season.

In January 2019, Crosson signed with the Spirit ahead of the 2019 season. She scored her first professional goal on April 13, 2019, against Sky Blue FC.

=== Celtic ===
In September 2020 Crosson signed for Scottish Women's Premier League club Celtic.
