= NWSL Players' Awards =

Women's soccer league awards

- Sport: Soccer
- Competition: National Women's Soccer League
- Country: United States
- Presented by: NWSL Players Association

History
- First award: 2019
- Editions: 1

The National Women's Soccer League Players Association Awards (often called the NWSLPA Awards or the NWSL Players' Awards) are annual awards voted on by the players of the National Women's Soccer League (NWSL) since 2019. These awards are presented by the National Women's Soccer League Players Association (NWSLPA), the trade union representing non-allocated players in the NWSL. They are considered one of the major end-of-season awards for NWSL players alongside the league's own awards. As there are often differences between the league's own awards and the NWSL Players' Awards, many NWSL players consider the NWSL Players' Awards to be more prestigious as they are decided by only players themselves.

== Players' Player of the Year ==
Year		Player	Club	Also won	Ref.
2019	(Australia)	Sam Kerr	Chicago Red Stars	MVP, First XI	

== Players' Rookie of the Year ==
Year		Player	Club	Also won	Ref.
2019	(United States)	Bethany Balcer	Reign FC	ROY, Second XI	

== Players' Team of the Year ==
=== 2019 ===
Pos.	Player	Club	App.	Also won
GK	(United States) Aubrey Bledsoe	Washington Spirit	1	Goalkeeper of the Year, First XI
DF	(United States) Casey Short	Chicago Red Stars	1	First XI
DF	(United States) Becky Sauerbrunn	Utah Royals	1	Defender of the Year, First XI
DF	(New Zealand) Abby Erceg	North Carolina Courage	1	Second XI
DF	(United States) Jaelene Hinkle	North Carolina Courage	1	
MF	(United States) Crystal Dunn	North Carolina Courage	1	Second XI
MF	(Republic of Ireland) Denise O'Sullivan	North Carolina Courage	1	
MF	(Brazil) Debinha	North Carolina Courage	1	
FW	(United States) Kristen Hamilton	North Carolina Courage	1	Second XI
FW	(Australia) Sam Kerr	Chicago Red Stars	1	MVP, First XI
FW	(United States) Lynn Williams	North Carolina Courage	1	

== See also ==
- NWSL awards
