= Denise O'Sullivan =

Irish footballer (born 1994)

- O'Sullivan with Gotham FC in 2026

Personal information
- Full name: Denise Rebecca O'Sullivan
- Date of birth: 4 February 1994 (age 32)
- Place of birth: Cork, Ireland
- Height: 5 ft 4 in (1.63 m)
- Position: Midfielder

Team information
- Current team: Gotham FC (on loan from Liverpool)
- Number: 5

Youth career
- Wilton United

Senior career*
Years	Team	Apps	(Gls)
–2011	Wilton United		
2011	Peamount United	0	(0)
2011–2012	Cork City	15	(6)
2012	Peamount United	0	(0)
2012–2013	Cork City	11	(2)
2013–2016	Glasgow City	65	(33)
2016–2017	Houston Dash	29	(2)
2017–2025	North Carolina Courage	155	(3)
2018–2019	→ Canberra United (loan)	7	(0)
2019–2020	→ Western Sydney Wanderers (loan)	7	(1)
2020	→ Brighton & Hove Albion (loan)	9	(0)
2026–	Liverpool	9	(0)
2026–	→ Gotham FC (loan)	11	(0)

International career^{‡}
2011–	Republic of Ireland	133	(23)
- * Club domestic league appearances and goals as of 1 November 2026 ‡ National team caps and goals as of 13 October 2026

Denise Rebecca O'Sullivan (born 4 February 1994) is an Irish professional footballer who plays as a midfielder for Gotham FC of the National Women's Soccer League (NWSL), on loan from Women's Super League club Liverpool. At international level, she plays for the Republic of Ireland national team.

Born in Cork, O'Sullivan joined the newly formed Cork City at the outset of the Women's National League (WNL) in 2011. She also played for Peamount United in their UEFA Women's Champions League campaigns. In 2013, she signed her first professional contract with Glasgow City and was named the Scottish Women's Premier League (SWPL) Players' Player of the Year in 2014. After a successful spell in Glasgow, she signed with the NWSL's Houston Dash in 2016, but was waived the following year.

O'Sullivan then joined the North Carolina Courage and was an integral player for the club as they won three NWSL Shields and two NWSL Championships in her first three seasons. She was voted most valuable player (MVP) by her Courage teammates in 2018 and 2019 – after both double-winning campaigns. She became the Courage's captain in 2023, also winning two NWSL Challenge Cups, and holds the club record for all-time appearances. She played on-loan with Canberra United and Western Sydney Wanderers in Australia and Brighton & Hove Albion in England during several NWSL offseasons. After nine years at North Carolina, she joined Liverpool in 2026. She spent six months at Liverpool before moving to Gotham FC on an initial loan deal with obligation to buy.

O'Sullivan made her senior international debut for the Republic of Ireland at age 17 in 2011, since making over 100 appearances. She was named the FAI Senior International Player of the Year in 2015 and 2020. She was on the RTÉ Sports Person of the Year shortlist in 2019.

== Early life ==
"I was definitely regarded as 'the girl that plays football'. Coming home from school, I'd have some food, get on my soccer boots and then my mam wouldn't call me for hours. I'd be out there playing non-stop, just playing with the boys."

— Denise O'Sullivan

O'Sullivan was born in Cork and grew up in Knocknaheeny. The youngest of nine children, her brother John Paul played soccer for Ireland at youth international level. O'Sullivan learned to play football on the streets with her siblings and as a youth looked up to Roy Keane. She played for a boys' team, Nufarm Athletic, until age 11 when she had to leave due to rules against mixed-sex football. As a youth being one of the only girls playing football, O'Sullivan experienced pushback from some boys who felt football was a game for men and boys. This behaviour pushed her to prove them wrong. She recalled, "I used to always surprise them. They were stronger and faster, but I was technically better than them." She credits her toughness and passing skills to her childhood playing with boys. "[Back then] you'd only have one or two touches and there would be a boy smashing you. So, you'd have to let the ball go fast."

== Club career ==
=== Beginnings ===
O'Sullivan began her football career with Irish club Wilton United. On 27 July 2008, she won the FAI Women's Under-14 National Cup, scoring twice in the final against Longford Town. On 7 August 2011, she scored a goal in the FAI Women's Cup final, as Wilton United were defeated 3–1 by St Catherine's.

=== Peamount United and Cork ===
After her performance in the 2011 FAI Women's Cup final, O'Sullivan signed with Peamount United, ahead of their 2011–12 UEFA Women's Champions League campaign. She made three appearances in the Champions League for the South Dublin club, before returning to her hometown and joining newly founded Cork Women's FC, one of the six teams that competed in the Women's National League's (WNL) inaugural 2011–12 season. On 13 November 2011, she made her debut in a 6–1 loss to Peamount United. On 15 January 2012, she scored her first goal in a 3–1 away win over Wexford Youths. In her first season, she scored six goals in 15 appearances and was named to the league's Best XI. In July 2012, O'Sullivan re-joined Peamount United and made three appearances in the Champions League, scoring a goal in a 4–0 victory against Cardiff Metropolitan. After the club's exit from the Champions League, she returned to Cork and finished her second season with two goals in 11 appearances.

=== Glasgow City ===
On 10 July 2013, O'Sullivan joined Scottish champions Glasgow City, ahead of their 2013–14 UEFA Women's Champions League campaign. She scored on her league debut, on 28 July, in a 2–0 win over Rangers. On 8 August, she made her Champions League debut for the club in a 7–0 home victory against ŽNK Osijek. Her goal in a 3–1 win over Standard Liège on 17 October helped Glasgow City progress into the last 16 of the Champions League. On 16 November, it was announced that O'Sullivan had signed new contract with the club. She finished the 2013 season with three goals in 12 appearances in all competitions.

O'Sullivan made nine appearances in the 2014–15 UEFA Women's Champions League campaign and scored four goals, including a brace in a 4–0 victory against Zhytlobud-1 Kharkiv on 14 August 2014. After lifting the domestic treble and being part of the first Scottish team to ever reach the quarter-finals of the Champions League, she was voted SWPL Players' Player of the Year. On 16 December 2014, she signed a new two-year contract with Glasgow City. In August 2015, she was named SWPL Player of the Month. She was also named Glasgow City Players' Player of the Year, Coaches' Player of the Year and Fans' Player of the Year in both 2014 and 2015.

=== Houston Dash ===
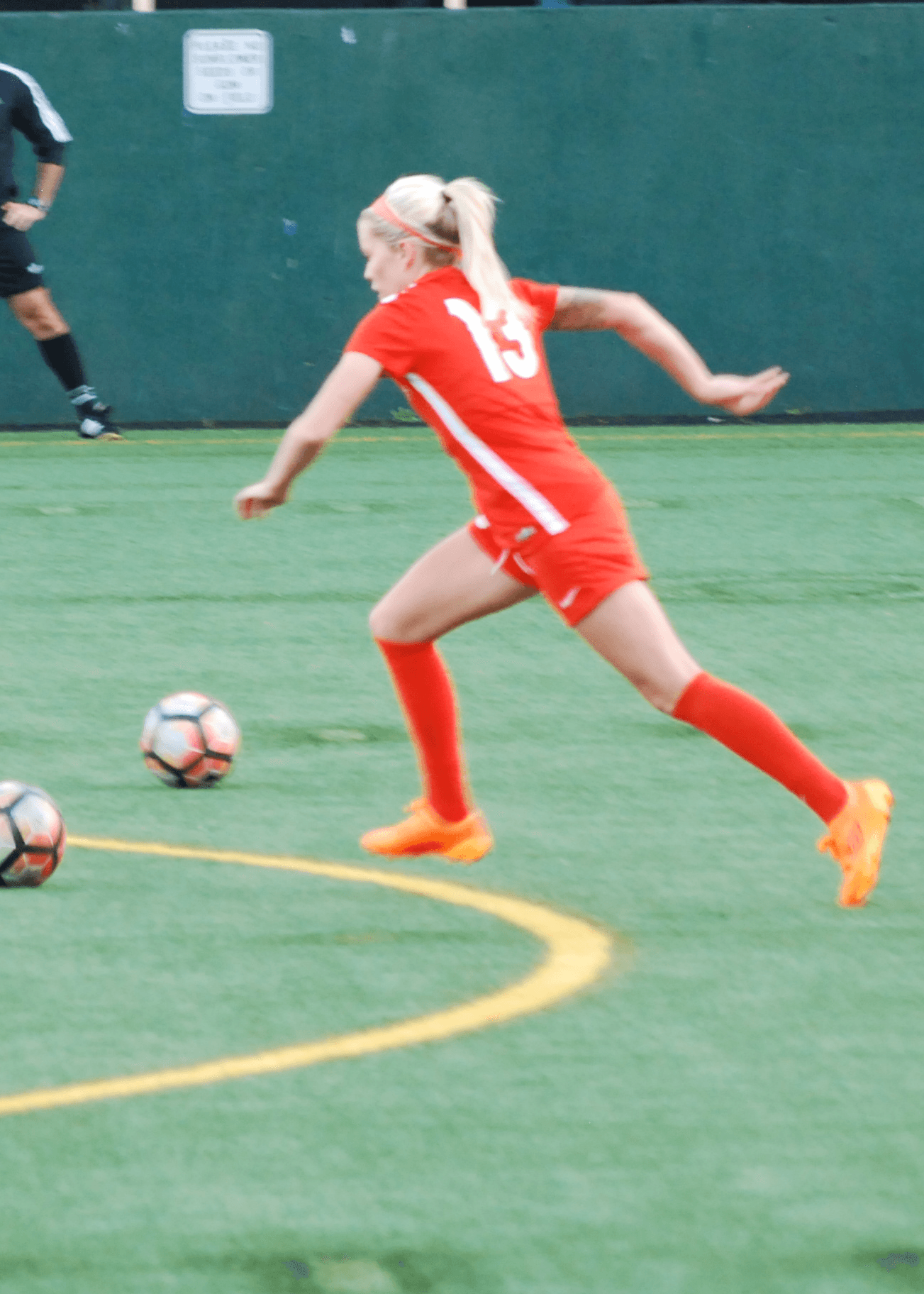
O'Sullivan warming up for Houston Dash, April 2017

On 19 March 2016, O'Sullivan signed with the Houston Dash, who paid Glasgow an undisclosed "four figure" transfer fee, which was the first time a Scottish women's club was paid a compensation fee for a player. She made her first appearance during the 2016 season in a 0–0 home draw with Sky Blue on 30 April, coming on as a substitute in the 46th minute. On 7 May, she came on as a substitute at halftime and scored her first goal in a 2–1 away victory against 2015 champion FC Kansas City. She finished the 2016 season with 2 goals and 5 assists in 18 appearances.

During the 2017 season, O'Sullivan appeared in 11 games for Houston and tallied an assist. When Randy Waldrum, who had brought her to the club, was sacked, interim coach Omar Morales restricted her to minimal playing time. In the middle of the season on 26 July, she requested to be placed on waivers to be picked up by another team.

=== North Carolina Courage ===
On 28 July 2017, O'Sullivan was claimed off waivers by the North Carolina Courage. On 10 August, she made her debut in a 1–0 win over FC Kansas City. The Courage finished in first place during the regular season with a 16–7–1 record, winning the NWSL Shield and advanced to the Playoffs. The game that clinched the NWSL Shield for the Courage was against O'Sullivan's former team, Houston Dash. The Courage won 4–0. On 8 October, O'Sullivan scored the game-winning goal in the 89th minute of the semi-final against the Chicago Red Stars. She made a total of nine appearances for the Courage in 2017 and scored one goal.

During the 2018 regular season, O'Sullivan made 22 appearances with 22 starts playing primarily as a holding midfielder. She played a total of 1,932 minutes on the pitch for the Courage. North Carolina finished in first place and won the NWSL Shield for the second consecutive season with a 17–1–6 record. O'Sullivan was voted the Most Valuable Player (MVP) on the team by her Courage teammates at the end of the season. On 22 September, O'Sullivan played the entire match as the Courage won the NWSL Championship 3–0 over the Portland Thorns FC, the first time the Courage had won the title. O'Sullivan was named MVP by her team.

She's almost – out of the whole team – the one player we can't play without. That's what she's become. She has a massive impact on tactics because she controls the tempo, dictates the tempo and her job functions are multi-faceted. She's the first player on the team sheet every week in Courage country.

— North Carolina Courage head coach Paul Riley, Goal

During the 2019 season, O'Sullivan was a starter in 22 of the 24 games she played. The Courage finished in first place with a 15–5–4 record winning the NWSL Shield for the third consecutive season. On 11 October, the Courage announced that O'Sullivan had been voted MVP by the team for the second consecutive year. O'Sullivan had distributed 1,102 passes (50 per game) and had a pass success rate of 84%. After defeating Reign FC 4–1 in the semi-finals, O'Sullivan helped lead the Courage win their second NWSL Championship shutting out the Chicago Red Stars 4–0 in the final. O'Sullivan started and played the entire match. Teammate Sam Mewis said O'Sullivan was 'the "glue" that holds the team together, winning tackles and spraying the ball wide from a deeper position.'

In November 2019, O'Sullivan signed a multi-year contract with the Courage. Head coach Riley said, "She is one of the first names on the team sheet every week. She is a massive influencer in the way we play. She has a genius soccer IQ that makes her a brilliant reader and manipulator of the game. She is a tremendous footballer and passer of the ball and she breaks up the opponent's playmaking ability with an intuitive reading of the game." However, she made only five appearances for the Courage in the pandemic-shortened 2020 season before going on loan to Brighton. O'Sullivan made 23 appearances with 23 starts in the 2021 season, helping the Courage finish in sixth place.

O'Sullivan played every minute of the preseason 2022 NWSL Challenge Cup, in which the Courage defeated the Washington Spirit 2–1 in the final. She made 19 appearances and 18 starts in the regular season as the Courage finished seventh, missing the playoffs.

O'Sullivan was named captain before the 2023 season. On April 19, 2023, she scored a last-minute goal against the Orlando Pride to draw 1–1 in the Challenge Cup group stage. She helped the Courage defend that title as they defeated Racing Louisville 2–0 in the final. She was named to the NWSL Best XI Second Team at the end of the season. She played and started in 20 games and scored 1 goal and ranked top five in the league in passing accuracy and duels won. North Carolina placed third in the league but lost to eventual champions NJ/NY Gotham FC in the quarterfinals.

On 29 July 2024, O'Sullivan's contract was extended to keep her with the Courage through the end of 2026. She played in 23 league games, starting 21, and scored 1 goal in 2024, as the Courage finished fifth in the league, losing to the Kansas City Current in the quarterfinals.

O'Sullivan played in 18 games and started 17 for the Courage in 2025, missing about two months with a knee injury. She made her first start since the injury in the season finale, playing the entire match in a 3–2 win over Gotham FC on 2 November 2025, as the Courage finished ninth and narrowly missed playoffs.

==== Loans ====
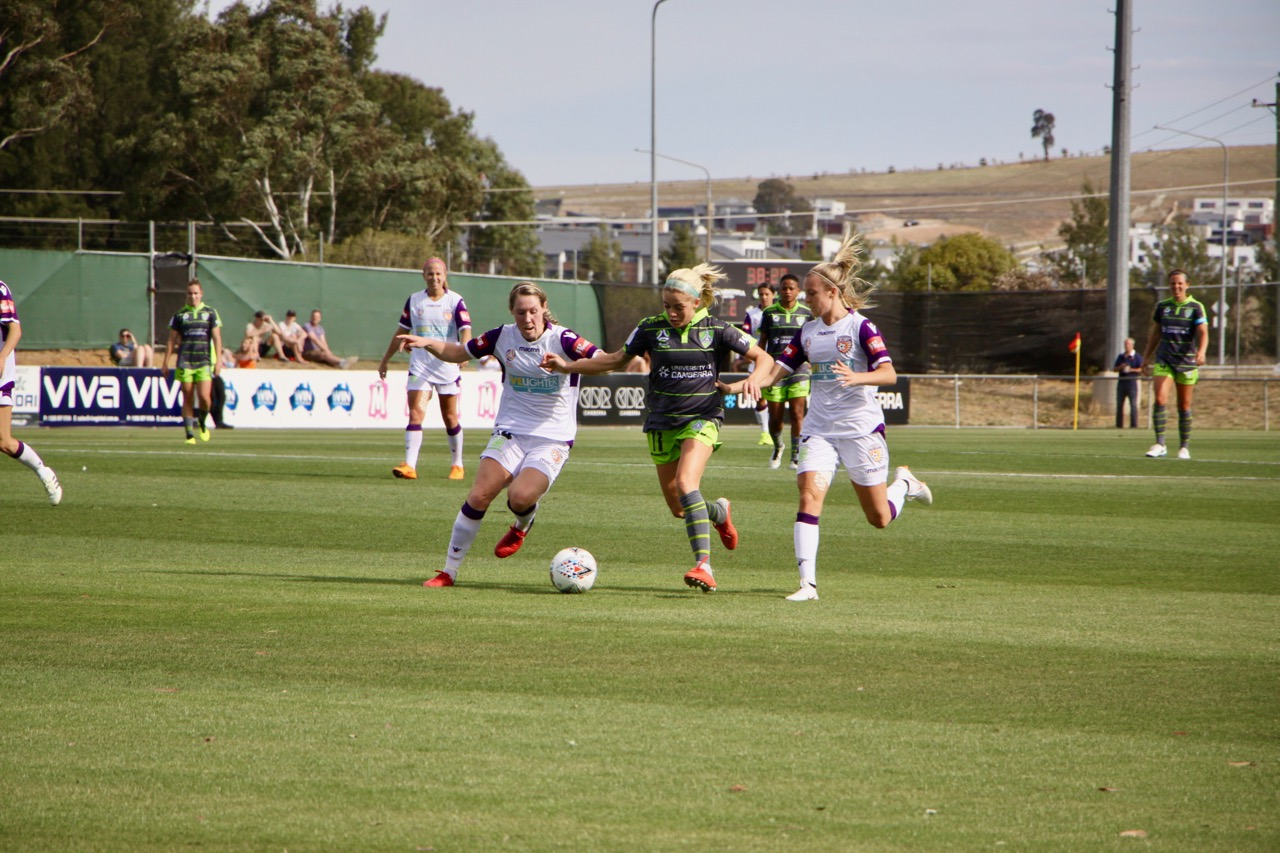
O'Sullivan playing for Canberra United, November 2018

On 18 October 2018, O'Sullivan was signed by Canberra United as their guest player for the 2018–19 W-League season and was given the number 11 shirt. As a guest player in the W-League, she is permitted to play seven non-consecutive games. On 28 October 2018, she made her debut in a 2–0 home victory against Melbourne City. The Sydney Morning Herald reported that O'Sullivan had been "a sensation" in her seven games for the club.

For the 2019–20 W-League season, O'Sullivan was loaned once again to an Australian club, joining her North Carolina Courage teammates Lynn Williams and Kristen Hamilton at Western Sydney Wanderers as a guest player. She made her debut for the club on 22 November during a 1–0 against Newcastle Jets FC. During a 4–0 win against Canberra United on 26 December, she scored in the 59th minute doubling the team's advantage. O'Sullivan was a starting midfielder in all seven games that she played. Western Sydney finished the regular season in fourth place. Their fourth-place finish earned the team a berth to the semi-finals where they were defeated 5–1 by eventual champions, Melbourne City.

In September 2020, O'Sullivan moved on loan to English FA WSL club Brighton & Hove Albion through 31 December 2020. She wanted to be available for Ireland's rescheduled UEFA Women's Euro 2022 qualifying Group I fixtures. Travelling back and forth from the United States would force her to undergo three separate two-week periods of quarantine within nine weeks. She made her debut for Brighton as a half-time substitute for fellow Corkonian Megan Connolly in a 0–0 draw at Manchester City on 13 September 2020. She was a starting midfielder in eight of the nine matches she played.

=== Liverpool ===
On 17 January 2026, O'Sullivan signed with WSL club Liverpool on a transfer from the Courage. Her transfer fee, reported in the range of £300,000, broke Liverpool's club record for a transfer fee paid, which previously stood at the £210,000 paid for Olivia Smith in 2024. She made her Reds debut on 18 January 2026 in a 6-0 Women's FA Cup victory over London Bees, scoring her first goal for the club after six minutes. She made her Women's Super League debut on 25 January 2026 in a 2–0 victory over Spurs, the team's first league victory of the season. O'Sullivan left Liverpool in July 2026 to join Gotham FC.

==== Gotham FC (loan) ====
On 14 July 2026, NWSL club Gotham FC announced that they had acquired O'Sullivan from Liverpool on an initial year-long loan deal with obligation to buy. O'Sullivan made her Gotham FC debut five days later, participating in a 3–2 come-from-behind victory over the Seattle Reign.

== International career ==
=== Youth ===
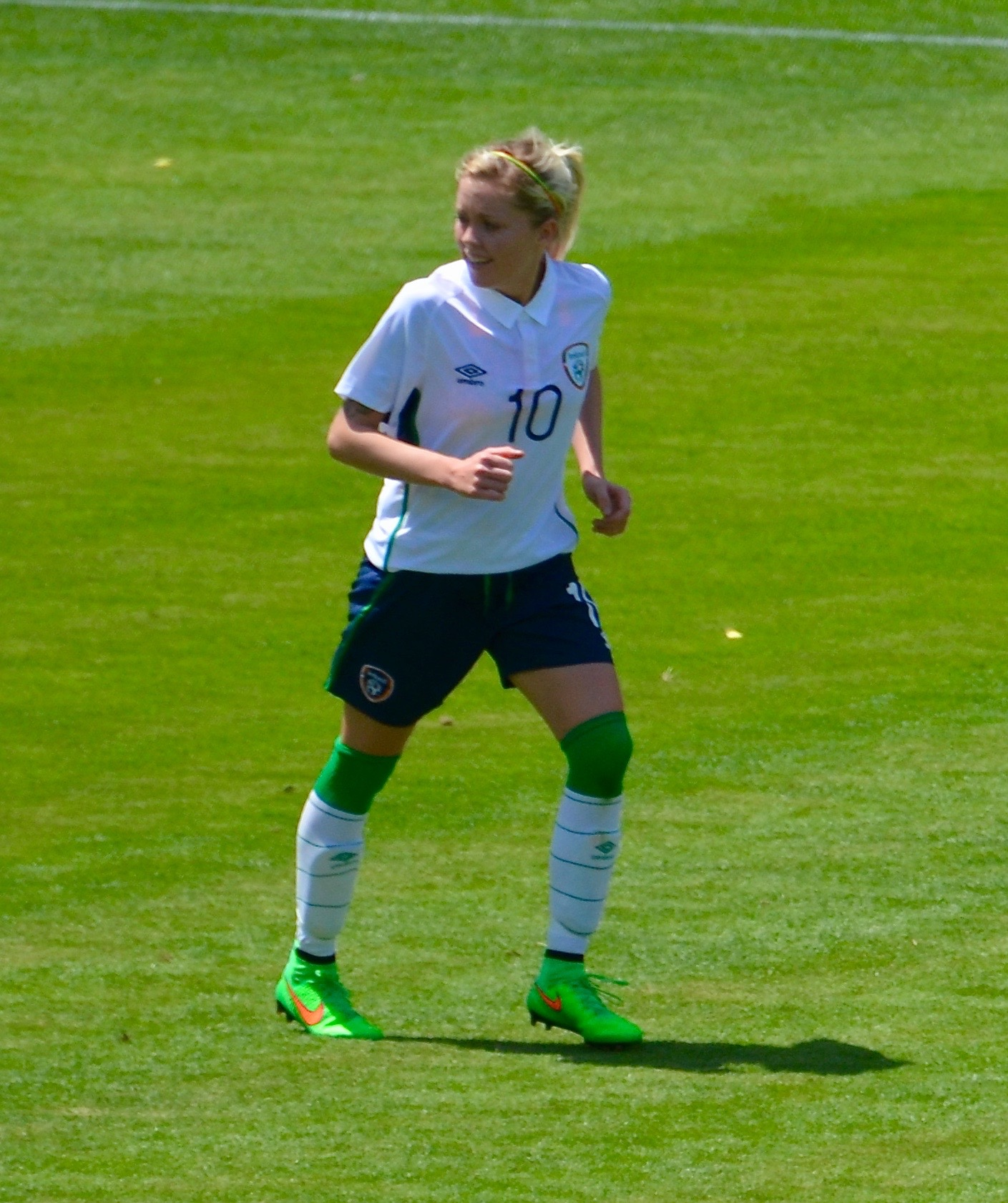
O'Sullivan playing for Ireland in 2015

O'Sullivan was part of the under-17 team that finished in second place at the 2010 UEFA Women's Under-17 Championship, after losing on penalties in the final against Spain. At the 2010 FIFA U-17 Women's World Cup in Trinidad and Tobago, she scored in the quarter-final defeat against eventual runners-up Japan, after helping Ireland finish top of a group that included Brazil, Canada and Ghana.

=== Senior ===
On 17 September 2011, O'Sullivan made her senior debut and scored both goals in a 2–0 UEFA Women's Euro 2013 qualifying Group 4 win over Wales in Newport. She headed Ireland into the lead over Scotland in their Euro 2013 qualifier at Tynecastle Stadium in April 2012, but the Scots staged a late comeback to win 2–1.

O'Sullivan continued to be selected by national team coach Susan Ronan and participated in Ireland's failed 2015 FIFA Women's World Cup qualification campaign. Alongside namesake Fiona O'Sullivan she was the team's joint-top goalscorer with three goals. She was named 2015 FAI Senior International Player of the Year.

She remained an important national team player under Ronan's successor Colin Bell, displaying good form in the unsuccessful 2019 FIFA Women's World Cup qualifying series.

== Style of play ==
O'Sullivan emerged as a promising forward with the Irish youth national teams. She developed into a midfield playmaker, described by her North Carolina Courage coach Paul Riley as one of the most "gifted and complete" in world football: "She has a massive impact on tactics because she controls the tempo, dictates the tempo and her job functions are multi-faceted."

O'Sullivan is noted as an aggressive player and was nicknamed "junkyard" by her coach. In November 2019, Ireland's head coach Vera Pauw declared O'Sullivan one of the best players in the world: "There is no player in the world at this moment that is a playmaker but also the motor in winning the ball back. She has everything." In December 2019, she was included in The Guardian's The 100 Best Female Footballers In The World and was described as "a combative presence in the Courage midfield [and] the heartbeat of Paul Riley's successful side."

== Career statistics ==
=== Club ===
As of match played 16 May 2026

Appearances and goals by club, season and competition
Club	Season	League			National cup (Note: Includes Scottish Women's Cup, Women's FA Cup)		League cup (Note: Includes Scottish Women's Premier League Cup, Women's League Cup)		Continental		Other		Total	
Club	Season	Division	Apps	Goals	Apps	Goals	Apps	Goals	Apps	Goals	Apps	Goals	Apps	Goals
Cork City	2011–12	Women's National League	13	6	?	?	—		—		—		13	6
Cork City	2012–13	Women's National League	10	2	?	?	—		—		—		10	2
Cork City	Total		23	8	0	0	0	0	0	0	0	0	23	8
Peamount United	2011–12	Women's National League	—		—		—		3	0	—		3	0
Peamount United	2012–13	Women's National League	—		—		—		3	1	—		3	1
Peamount United	Total		0	0	0	0	0	0	6	1	0	0	6	1
Glasgow City	2013	SWPL	6	2	2	0	0	0	5	1	—		13	3
Glasgow City	2014	SWPL	18	9	3	3	2	4	9	4	—		32	20
Glasgow City	2015	SWPL	Stats unavailable						2	0	—		20	10
Glasgow City	Total		24+	11+	5+	3+	2+	4+	16	5	0	0	65	33
Houston Dash	2016	NWSL	18	2	—		—		—		—		18	2
Houston Dash	2017	NWSL	11	0	—		—		—		—		11	0
Houston Dash	Total		29	2	0	0	0	0	0	0	0	0	29	2
North Carolina Courage	2017	NWSL	9	1	—		—		—		—		9	1
North Carolina Courage	2018	NWSL	24	0	—		—		—		—		24	0
North Carolina Courage	2019	NWSL	25	0	—		—		—		—		25	0
North Carolina Courage	2020	NWSL	—		—		5	0	—		—		5	0
North Carolina Courage	2021	NWSL	24	0	—		3	0	—		—		27	0
North Carolina Courage	2022	NWSL	19	1	—		8	0	—		—		27	1
North Carolina Courage	2023	NWSL	21	1	—		4	1	—		—		25	2
North Carolina Courage	2024	NWSL	24	1	—		—		—		2	1	26	2
North Carolina Courage	2025	NWSL	18	0	—		—		—		—		18	0
North Carolina Courage	Total		164	4	0	0	20	1	0	0	2	1	186	6
Canberra United (loan)	2018–19	W-League	7	0	—		—		—		—		7	0
Western Sydney Wanderers (loan)	2019–20	W-League	7	1	—		—		—		—		7	1
Brighton & Hove Albion (loan)	2020–21	Women's Super League	9	0	0	0	2	0	—		—		11	0
Liverpool	2025–26	Women's Super League	9	0	4	2	0	0	—		—		13	2
Career total			272+	26+	9+	5+	24+	5+	22	6	2	1	347	53

=== International ===
As of match played 13 October 2026

Appearances and goals by national team and year
National team	Year	Apps	Goals
Republic of Ireland	2011	3	3
Republic of Ireland	2012	10	1
Republic of Ireland	2013	8	2
Republic of Ireland	2014	11	2
Republic of Ireland	2015	10	0
Republic of Ireland	2016	9	1
Republic of Ireland	2017	9	1
Republic of Ireland	2018	8	0
Republic of Ireland	2019	7	0
Republic of Ireland	2020	5	1
Republic of Ireland	2021	9	5
Republic of Ireland	2022	9	3
Republic of Ireland	2023	13	2
Republic of Ireland	2024	8	1
Republic of Ireland	2025	9	1
Republic of Ireland	2026	5	1
Total		133	23

Scores and results list Republic of Ireland's goals first. Score column indicates score after each O'Sullivan goal.

List of international goals scored by Denise O'Sullivan
No.	Cap	Date	Venue	Opponent	Score	Result	Competition	Ref.
1	1	17 September 2011	Newport Stadium, Newport	Wales	1–0	2–0	2013 UEFA Women's Championship qual. Group 4	
2	1	17 September 2011	Newport Stadium, Newport	Wales	2–0	2–0	2013 UEFA Women's Championship qual. Group 4	
3	3	22 October 2011	Tallaght Stadium, Dublin	Israel	1–0	2–0	2013 UEFA Women's Championship qual. Group 4	
4	7	5 April 2012	Tynecastle Stadium, Edinburgh	Scotland	1–0	1–2	2013 UEFA Women's Championship qual. Group 4	
5	19	22 September 2013	Carlisle Grounds, Bray	Slovakia	2–0	2–0	2015 FIFA Women's World Cup UEFA qual. Group 1	
6	21	30 October 2013	Ob Jezeru City Stadium, Velenje	Slovenia	3–0	3–0	2015 FIFA Women's World Cup UEFA qual. Group 1	
7	24	10 March 2014	Tasos Markou, Paralimni	Switzerland	1–0	2–1	2014 Cyprus Women's Cup	
8	28	14 June 2014	Tallaght Stadium, Dublin	Croatia	1–0	1–0	2015 Women's World Cup UEFA qual. Group 1	
9	48	7 April 2016	Stadion pod Malim brdom, Petrovac	Montenegro	4–0	5–0	2017 UEFA Women's Championship qual. Group 2	
10	59	24 October 2017	NTC Senec, Senec	Slovakia	1–0	2–0	2019 FIFA Women's World Cup UEFA qual. Group 3	
11	77	11 March 2020	Stadion pod Malim brdom, Petrovac	Montenegro	3–0	3–0	2022 UEFA Women's Championship qual. Group I	
12	85	21 September 2021	Tallaght Stadium, Dublin	Australia	2–1	3–2	Friendly	
13	87	26 October 2021	Helsinki Olympic Stadium, Helsinki	Finland	2–1	2–1	2023 FIFA Women's World Cup UEFA qual. Group A	
14	89	30 November 2021	Tallaght Stadium, Dublin	Georgia	4–0	11–0	2023 FIFA Women's World Cup UEFA qual. Group A	
15	89	30 November 2021	Tallaght Stadium, Dublin	Georgia	5–0	11–0	2023 FIFA Women's World Cup UEFA qual. Group A	
16	89	30 November 2021	Tallaght Stadium, Dublin	Georgia	6–0	11–0	2023 FIFA Women's World Cup UEFA qual. Group A	
17	92	22 February 2022	La Manga Club Football Stadium, La Manga	Wales	1–0	1–0	2022 Pinatar Cup	
18	94	27 June 2022	Tengiz Burjanadze Stadium, Gori	Georgia	9–0	9–0	2023 FIFA Women's World Cup UEFA qual. Group A	
19	96	6 September 2022	NTC Senec, Senec	Slovakia	1–0	1–0	2023 FIFA Women's World Cup UEFA qual. Group A	
20	107	26 September 2023	Hidegkuti Nándor Stadion, Budapest	Hungary	4–0	4–0	2023–24 UEFA Women's Nations League	
21	109	31 October 2023	Loro Boriçi Stadium, Shkodër	Albania	1–0	1–0	2023–24 UEFA Women's Nations League	
22	115	16 July 2024	Pairc Ui Chaoimh, Cork	France	1–0	3–1	UEFA Women's Euro 2025 qualifying play-offs	
23	129	29 November 2025	Estadio Municipal de Marbella, Marbella, Spain	Hungary	3–1	3–2	Friendly	
24	133	13 October 2026	Pairc Ui Chaoimh, Cork	Kazakhstan	4–0	4–0	2027 World Cup qualification UEFA play-offs	

== Honours ==
Glasgow City

- SWPL: 2013, 2014, 2015
- SWPL Cup: 2014, 2015
- Scottish Women's Cup: 2013, 2014, 2015

North Carolina Courage

- NWSL Championship: 2018, 2019
- NWSL Shield: 2017, 2018, 2019
- NWSL Challenge Cup: 2022, 2023

Gotham FC

- NWSL Shield: 2026

Individual

- WNL Best XI: 2011–12
- Echo Sportswoman of the Year: 2014
- SWPL Players' Player of the Year: 2014
- FAI Senior International Player of the Year: 2015, 2020
- PFA Ireland Senior International Player of the Year: 2018, 2019, 2020
- NC Courage Most Valuable Player: 2018, 2019
- RTÉ Sports Person of the Year shortlist: 2019
- NWSL Players' Team of the Year: 2019
- The Irish Times/Sport Ireland Sportswoman of Month: November 2019
- W-League Player of the Month: December 2019
- Cork Person of the Month: January 2023
- NWSL Best XI Second Team: 2023
- Echo Sportswoman of the Month: July 2024
- Ireland Women's Supporters Club Player of the Year: 2024-25

== See also ==
- List of foreign NWSL players
- List of foreign W-League (Australia) players
