= Morgan Gautrat =

American soccer player (born 1993)

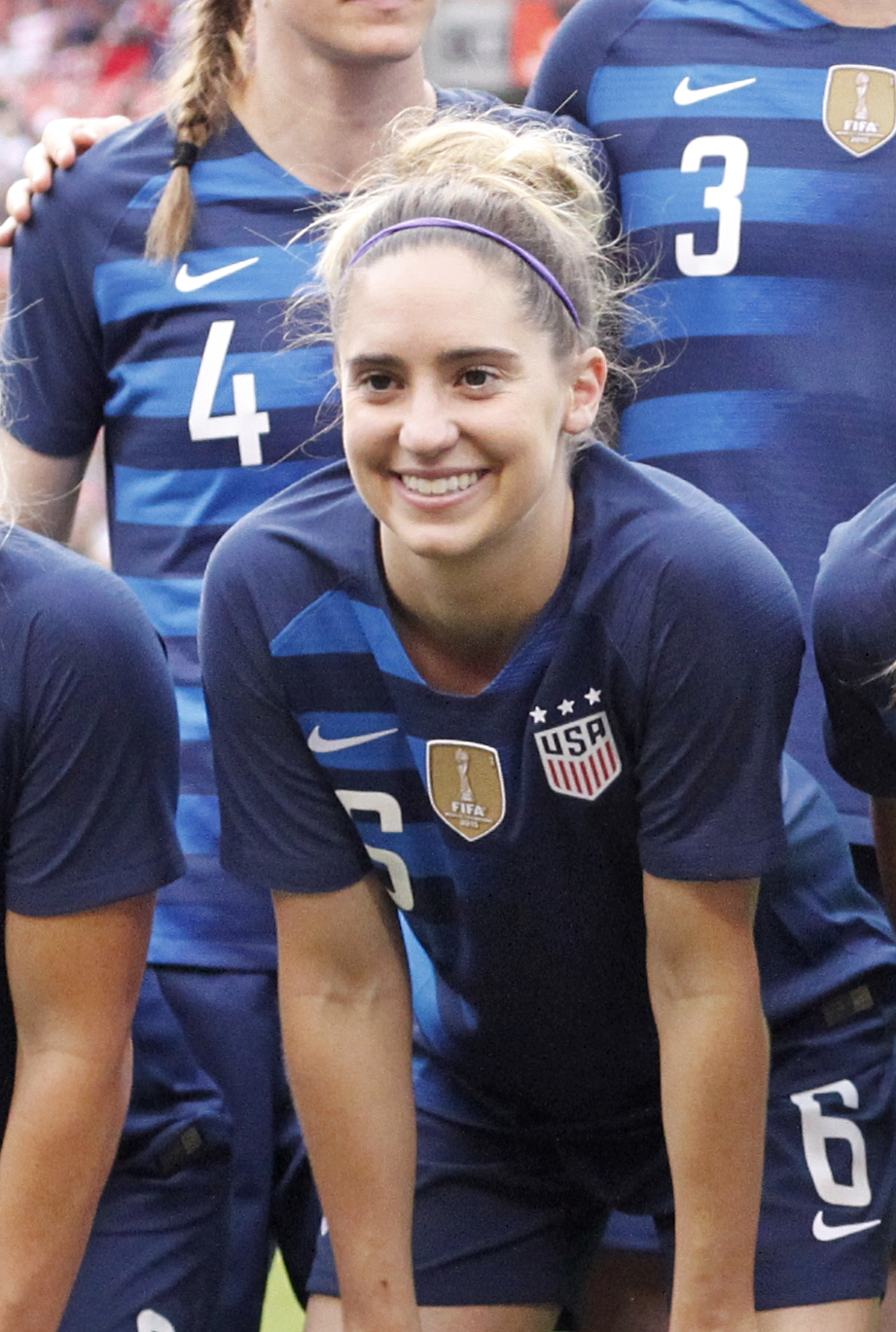
- Gautrat with the United States national team in 2018

Personal information
- Full name: Morgan Paige Gautrat
- Birth name: Morgan Paige Brian
- Date of birth: February 26, 1993 (age 33)
- Place of birth: St. Simons, Georgia, United States
- Height: 5 ft 7 in (1.70 m)
- Position: Midfielder

Team information
- Current team: Newcastle United
- Number: 7

Youth career
- 2005–2012: Ponte Vedra Storm
- 2007–2011: Frederica Academy

College career
Years	Team	Apps	(Gls)
2011–2014	Virginia Cavaliers	81	(41)

Senior career*
Years	Team	Apps	(Gls)
2015–2017	Houston Dash	33	(0)
2017	Chicago Red Stars	2	(0)
2018	Lyon	4	(1)
2018–2022	Chicago Red Stars	48	(3)
2023	Kansas City Current	5	(0)
2024–2025	Orlando Pride	28	(0)
2025	→ Newcastle United (loan)	5	(1)
2026-	Newcastle United	2	(0)

International career
2008–2010	United States U17	22	(15)
2012	United States U20	21	(4)
2013–2022	United States	88	(8)
Medal record
FIFA Women's World Cup
Gold medal – first place	2015 Canada	Team
Gold medal – first place	2019 France	Team
- * Club domestic league appearances and goals as of December 12, 2025

Morgan Paige Gautrat (née Brian; born February 26, 1993) is an American professional soccer player who plays as a midfielder for Women's Super League 2 club Newcastle United W.F.C. She first appeared for the United States national team during a friendly against Korea Republic on June 15, 2013. She has made 88 total appearances for the team and scored eight goals.

Gautrat played collegiate soccer with the University of Virginia Cavaliers from 2011 to 2014. In her four years with the Cavaliers, she scored 41 goals and recorded 43 assists, finishing her collegiate career ranked second in career points, second in career assists, and fifth in career goals. Gautrat won the MAC Hermann Trophy in both 2013 and 2014, becoming the fourth women's player to win the award in consecutive years. Following her collegiate career, Gautrat was selected first overall by the Houston Dash in the 2015 NWSL College Draft. Gautrat helped the United States win their titles at the 2015 and 2019 FIFA Women's World Cup. At age 22, she was the youngest member of the team at the 2015 World Cup.

== Early life ==
Born in St. Simons Island, Georgia to Vickie and Steve Brian, Morgan was raised with her older sister Jennifer. St. Simon's Island had an immense soccer culture and Gautrat played with girls who were four or five years older than she. Because of her small size among the team, she earned the nickname 'Plankton.' Gautrat eventually went on to play with the Ponte Vedra Storm in Ponte Vedra Beach, Florida, where she played from U-12 to U-19. However, the team played as the Clay County Soccer Club for their U-19-year. While with the Storm, Gautrat won state championships at the U-17 and U-19 levels. In their U-19-year, as the Clay County Soccer Club, the team won the 2012 United States Youth Soccer National Championship. Gautrat missed the championships, as she was with the United States U-20 women's national team.

Gautrat tried out for the Olympic Development Program state team in Florida along with all of her teammates from the Ponte Vedra Storm. She did not make the ODP team that first year; however she used that as motivation to train harder. She eventually made the state, regional, and national ODP teams. Regarding her experience playing in ODP, Gautrat stated that it "was what got [her] recognized in the beginning."

Gautrat attended Frederica Academy in St. Simon's Island from 2007 to 2011, where she played soccer all four years and helped the team win four consecutive state titles. In addition to soccer, Gautrat also played varsity basketball as an eighth-grader, freshman, sophomore, and senior. She received both All-Region and All-State recognition for basketball.

Gautrat ended her high school soccer career with 186 goals and 95 assists. She was a two-time Parade All-American and two-time Gatorade Georgia State Player of the Year. In 2010, she was named an NSCAA High School and Youth All-American and was also the 2010 NSCAA Youth Player of the Year as well as the 2010 Parade National Player of the Year. In 2011, she was named Gatorade National Player of the Year. Gautrat was also the first soccer player to be honored as the Gatorade National Female Athlete of the Year in 2011.

=== University of Virginia Cavaliers, 2011–2014 ===
Gautrat attended the University of Virginia. As a first year in 2011, she started in 22 games and appeared in 23 of the 24 total matches. As a midfielder, she was the second-leading scorer for the Cavaliers with 11 goals and eight assists. She was named the Soccer America National Freshman of the Year, NSCAA First-Team All-American, Second-Team Soccer America MVP and was a semi-finalist for the Hermann Trophy. She was named the Atlantic Coast Conference (ACC) Freshman of the Year and First-Team All-ACC.

During her second year, Gautrat appeared in 15 games, starting 13, after missing the beginning of the season due to representing the United States at the 2012 FIFA U-20 Women's World Cup where she helped the US take home gold. Gautrat scored four goals and served seven assists for the Cavaliers. She was named NSCAA 1st Team All-Southeast Region, First Team All-ACC, ACC Tournament MVP as well as Second Team Soccer America MVP, Second Team TopDrawerSoccer.com Team of the Season, and First Team VaSID All-State.

As a third year in 2013, Gautrat started 25 games. She was first in Atlantic Coast Conference (ACC) in scoring with 46 points on 16 goals and a league-high 14 assists. She scored in all four NCAA Tournament wins to lead Virginia to College Cup. She was named Soccer America Player of the Year, TopDrawerSoccer.com Player of the Year, VaSID State Player of the Year, First-Team NSCAA All-American, First-Team Soccer America MVP and First-Team All-ACC. She was named winner of 2013 Hermann Trophy.

As a fourth year in 2014, Gautrat repeated as the winner of the Hermann Trophy, becoming the fifth woman to win the award twice, after Mia Hamm of North Carolina (1992 and 1993), Cindy Parlow of North Carolina (1997 and 1998), Christine Sinclair of Portland (2004 and 2005) and Kerri Hanks (2006 and 2008).

== Club career ==
=== Houston Dash, 2015–2017 ===
On January 16, 2015, the Houston Dash selected Gautrat with the first overall pick in the 2015 NWSL College Draft for the 2015 season of the National Women's Soccer League. Gautrat made her first appearance for the Dash on April 10, 2015, in a match against the Washington Spirit. Due to commitments with the United States women's national team at the 2015 FIFA Women's World Cup in Canada, Gautrat missed almost half of the NWSL season. She returned to the Dash in late-July, appearing in a match against FC Kansas City on July 20. Gautrat made ten appearances for the Dash in the regular season, recording three assists in 810 minutes played. The Dash finished fifth in the league and did not advance to the playoffs.

On January 13, 2016, Gautrat was on the official list of United States women's national team allocated players for the 2016, having been assigned to the Houston Dash along with Carli Lloyd. Gautrat made seven appearances for the Dash before joining the national team in preparation for the 2016 Summer Olympics in Rio de Janeiro. Gautrat returned to Houston for her third season in the NWSL and fifth overall season for the NWSL. Gautrat made her 2017 debut on May 6, 2017, in Chicago during the fourth week of the NWSL historical 5th season. Gautrat sat for the first few weeks due to a MCL injury that she sustained during her 66th appearance for the USWNT during the She Believes Cup against France in early March.

=== Chicago Red Stars, 2017 ===
On August 30, 2017, the Chicago Red Stars acquired Gautrat from the Dash for Kristie Mewis. In January 2018, Gautrat signed a deal to play in France for Olympique Lyonnais, while Chicago retained her NWSL rights. The Chicago Red Stars announced Gautrat's return to the team on June 19, 2018, as she signed a deal for the remainder of the 2018 season.

=== Olympique Lyonnais, 2018 ===
On January 1, 2018, Olympique Lyonnais Féminin announced they had signed Gautrat to a two-and-a-half-year deal, that would run until June 30, 2020. On May 30, 2018, it was reported that Gautrat was leaving Lyon after only 5 months. This was confirmed on June 19, 2018, as the Chicago Red Stars announced she had signed a deal to return to the NWSL.

=== Chicago Red Stars, 2018–2022 ===
On June 19, 2018, after having spending 5 months with Olympique Lyonnais Féminin, Gautrat made her return to the Chicago Red Stars. Gautrat appeared in 9 regular season games for the team before appearing in her first career NWSL playoff game on September 18. The next season, Gautrat helped lead Chicago to the playoffs again, where the team earned its first playoff win in team history; Gautrat scored her first career NWSL goal in a September 15 game against Sky Blue FC and was named to her first ever NWSL Team of the Month that same month. The Chicago Red Stars announced Gautrat's departure at the end of the 2022 season.

=== Kansas City Current, 2023 ===
Ahead of the 2023 season, Gautrat joined Kansas City Current as a free agent on a two-year contract.

=== Orlando Pride, 2024–2025 ===
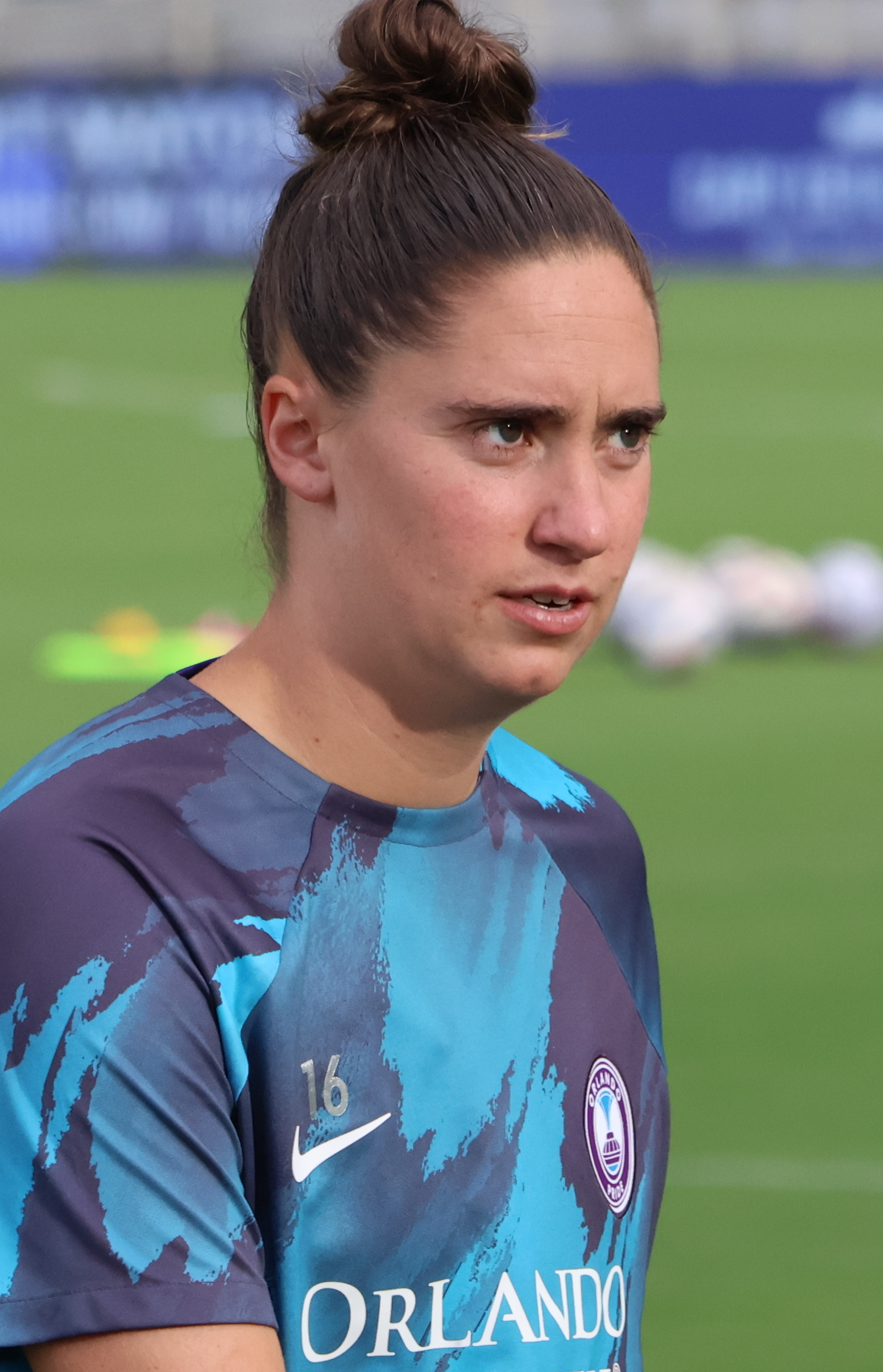
Gautrat with the Pride in the 2024 NWSL x Liga MX Femenil Summer Cup

On January 11, 2024, Orlando Pride traded for Gautrat and $50,000 in allocation money in exchange for a 2024 international roster spot.

=== Newcastle United, 2026 - Present ===
On August 25, 2025, Gautrat signed with Women's Super League 2 club Newcastle United on loan until December 2025. She scored her first goal for the club, an olympico, on October 5, 2025 in the 98th minute of a 2–2 draw against Crystal Palace.

On March 13, 2026, Newcastle announced the permanent signing of Gautrat following the expiration of her contract with Orlando Pride.

== International ==
=== Youth national teams ===
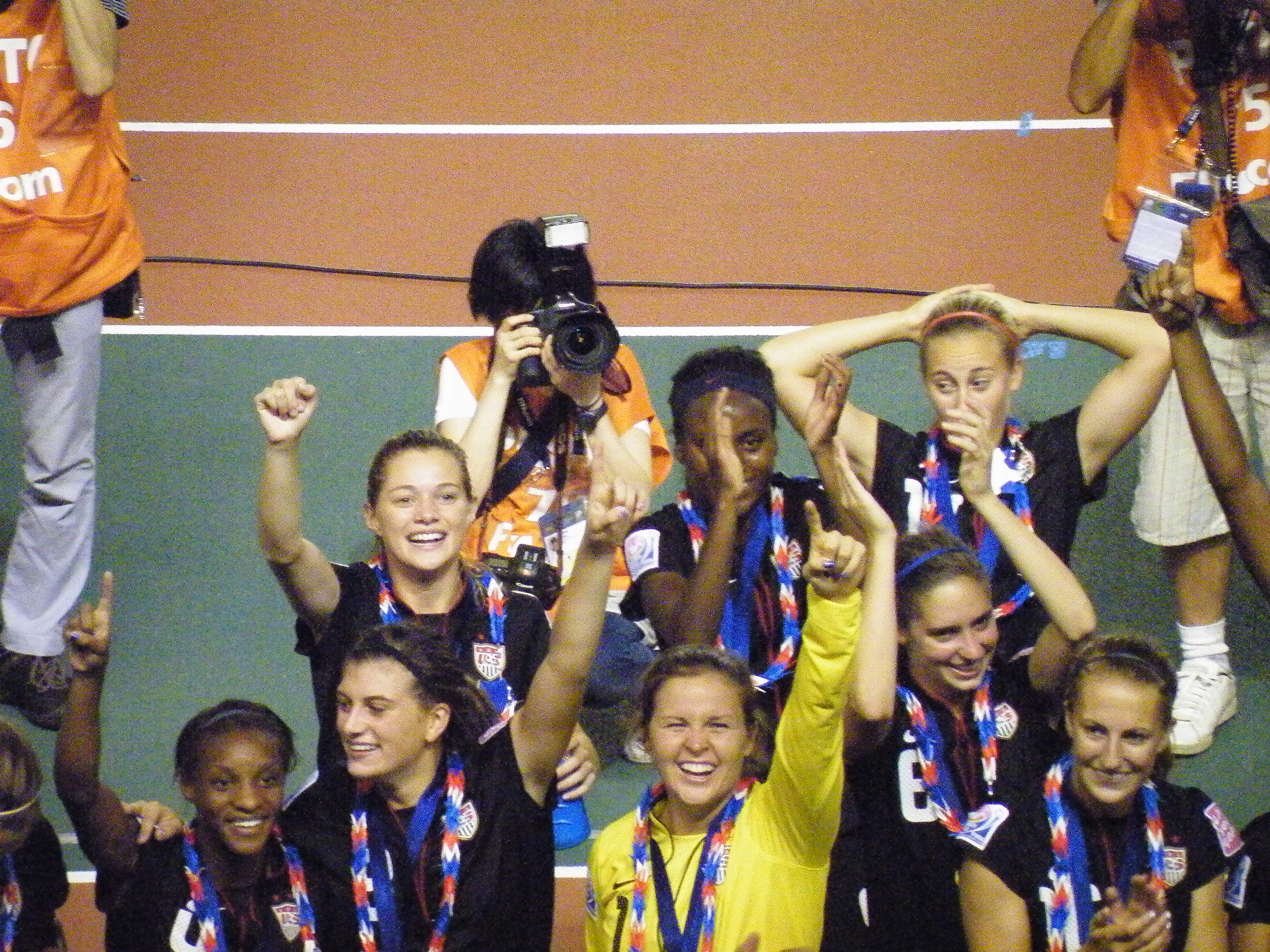
After the award ceremony at Japan 2012 FIFA under-20 women's world cup. From left to right: 4-Crystal Dunn, 3-Cari Roccaro, 7-Kealia Ohai, 1-Brayne Heaberlin (GK), 9-Chioma Ubogagu, 6-Morgan Gautrat, 17-Taylor Schram, 16-Sarah Killion

Gautrat was a member of the United States U-17 women's national soccer team that placed third at the 2010 FIFA U-17 Women's World Cup in Costa Rica. At age fifteen, she was the youngest member on the squad.

Gautrat was a member of the United States U20 squad that won the 2012 CONCACAF Under-20 Women's Championship and earned a spot at the 2012 FIFA U-20 Women's World Cup in Japan. During the qualifying tournament, she played in four games totaling 337 minutes, scored one goal and served one assist. Her goal occurred during the team's 4–0 semi-final victory over Mexico, which earned the squad its berth to the U-20 Women's World Cup. Leading up to the World Cup, she earned 15 U-20 caps and scored three goals.

Gautrat would later help the team win the 2012 FIFA U-20 Women's World Cup in Japan; playing all six matches and scoring a goal. Describing Gautrat, head coach Steve Swanson said, "Morgan does everything extremely well, which is rare for any midfielder. She can finish, she makes great runs, she's an excellent passer, she can take players one-on-one and she can head the ball. There are not a lot of things she can't do, but what sets her apart is her brain. She's got an amazing soccer brain for her age and she's still one of the younger players on this team."

=== Senior national team ===
Gautrat received her first senior national team call-up in June 2013, when she was named to a 23-player roster for a training camp and a two-game series against the Korea Republic. At 20 years old, Gautrat was the youngest player on the roster. Gautrat earned her first cap on June 15, 2013, during the first match against the Korea Republic, replacing Lauren Holiday in the 77th minute. On September 3, 2013, Gautrat made her second appearance in a match against Mexico at RFK Stadium. She replaced Erika Tymrak in the 70th minute. Two minutes later, Gautrat scored her first goal for the national team off an assist by Abby Wambach. The United States won the match 7–0.

In 2014, Gautrat made 16 appearances with the national team while also playing with her college team. She started off the year at a national team training camp from January 8 to 15 at U.S. Soccer's National Training Center in Carson, California. On February 24, Gautrat was named to the 24-player roster for the 2014 Algarve Cup that took place from March 5 to 12. She started in the team's first match of the tournament on March 5 against Japan, a 1–1 draw. She also started in the match against Sweden on March 7, a game that ended the 43-game unbeaten streak for the United States. Gautrat started in the team's final match of the tournament against Korea DPR that secured their seventh-place finish in the tournament.

Gautrat joined the team for a two-game series against China on April 6 and 10. She started in both matches. In late April, Gautrat was named to a 22-player roster for a match against Canada on May 8. She played 68 minutes of the match, which ended in a 1–1 draw. She was then named to the roster for two games against France on June 14 and 19. Gautrat was named to a 19-player roster for a match against Switzerland on August 20 in Sandy, Utah. She made an appearance during the match, coming in for Megan Rapinoe in the 78th minute. The United States went on the win 4–1.

Gautrat joined the national team for a training camp at the end of August in order to prepare for two matches against Mexico in September as well as the 2014 CONCACAF Women's Qualifying tournament in October. She appeared in the first game against Mexico on September 13 and was subsequently named to the roster for the 2014 CONCACAF Women's Championship that served as a qualification for the 2015 FIFA Women's World Cup. Gautrat made three appearances in the tournament, starting one. Her first appearance of the tournament came during the team's final group match against Haiti, when she replaced Tobin Heath in the 63rd minute. She also came in during the 67th minute of the semi-final match against Mexico on October 24, helping the United States win 3–0 and qualify for the 2015 FIFA Women's World Cup. Her third appearance came during the final against Costa Rica on October 26, helping the United States win the tournament. Following the CONCACAF Qualifying tournament, Gautrat was named to the 24-player roster for the International Tournament of Brasilia in Brazil that took place from December 10 to 21. She came in for Lauren Holiday during the 65th minute of the match against Brazil on December 14. Gautrat made two assists in the match against Argentina on December 18. Gautrat played all 90 minutes in the final against Brazil. The game was a 0–0 draw, but the tournament title was given to Brazil, who had more points from the group stage.

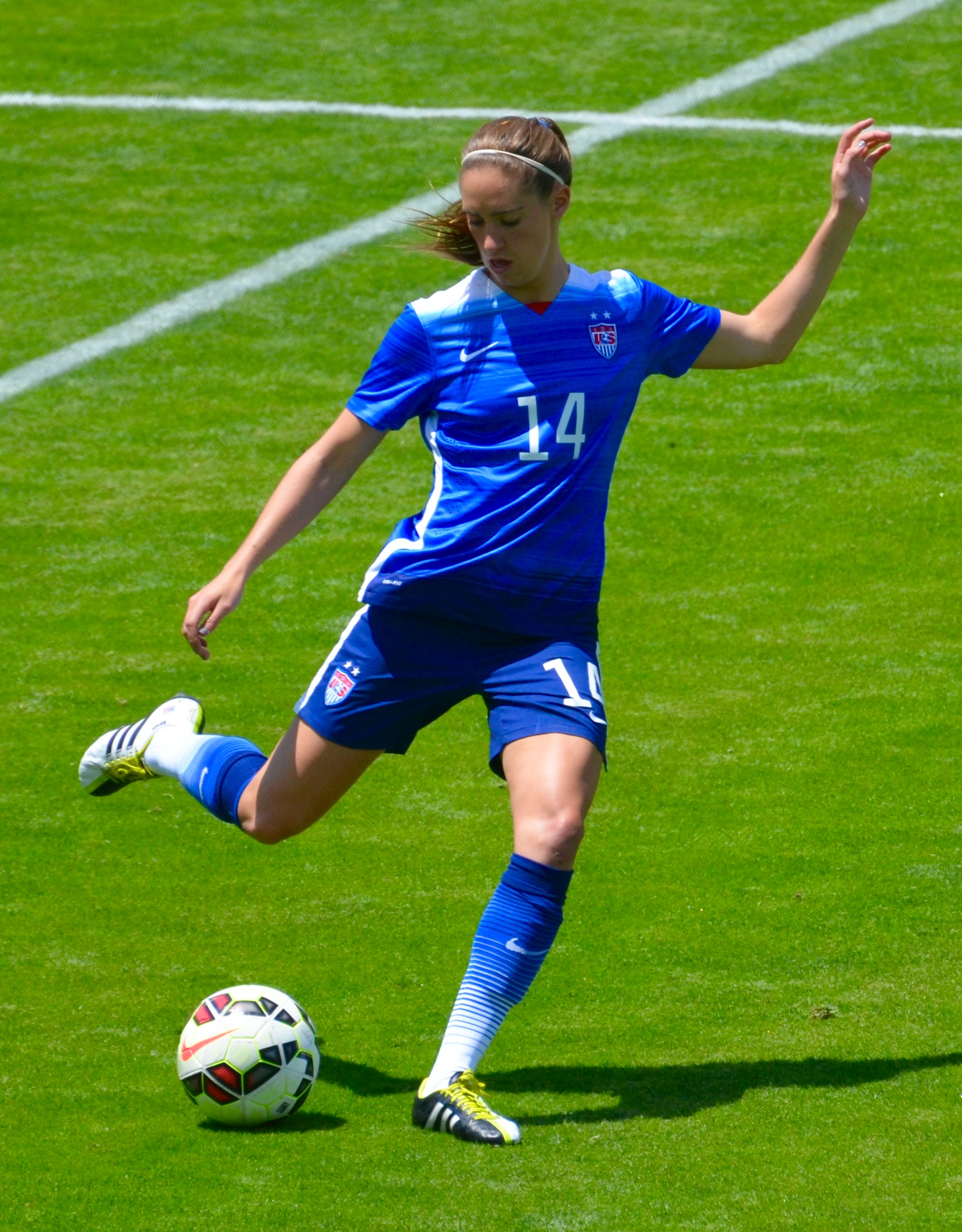
Gautrat playing for the USWNT, May 2015

==== 2015 FIFA Women's World Cup ====
Gautrat started off the year at a 21-day training camp in 2015 from January 5 to 25 at the U.S. Soccer National Training Center in Carson, California. Following the training camp, Gautrat was named to the 24-player team that would travel on a 13-day trip to Europe for matches against France and England in mid-February. Gautrat made the start in the match against France on February 8 and was replaced by Abby Wambach in the 63rd minute. She also played all 90 minutes in the match against England on February 13, which was a shutout victory for the United States. On February 21, Gautrat was named to the 25-player roster for the 2015 Algarve Cup in Portugal. She played all 90 minutes of the team's opening match against Norway on March 4, a 2–1 victory for the United States. She also started in the final match against France on March 11, helping the United States win their 10th Algarve Cup title. Following the Algarve Cup, Gautrat was named to a 25-player roster on March 20 for a match against New Zealand on April 4 in St. Louis. She entered the match in the 79th minute and scored the team's fourth and final goal in the 81st minute, helping the United States defeat New Zealand 4–0.

On April 14, 2015, Gautrat was named to the 23-player roster that would represent the United States at the 2015 FIFA Women's World Cup. At the age of 22, she was the youngest member of the team. She played in six games of the tournament, starting four. Gautrat became a World Cup Champion on July 5, when she helped the United States defeat Japan 5–2 in the Women's World Cup final. She recorded an assist during the match, passing the ball to Tobin Heath, who scored the final goal of the game. Gautrat joined the national team on a Victory Tour following their World Cup win that started in Pittsburgh on August 16 and ended in New Orleans on December 16.

==== 2016 Summer Olympics ====
Gautrat joined the national team for their first training camp of the year at the U.S. Soccer National Training Center in Carson, California from January 5 to 21. She was then named to the 20-player roster for 2016 CONCACAF Women's Olympic Qualifying. The United States qualified to the 2016 Olympic Games in Rio de Janeiro after a semi-final win against Trinidad and Tobago on February 19. Gautrat played all 90 minutes in the final against Canada on February 21. The United States won the tournament after defeating Canada 2–0 and Gautrat was named Budweiser Woman of the Match. Following the tournament, Gautrat was named to the 2016 CONCACAF Women's Olympic Qualifying Best XI and also won the Golden Ball for best player.

Gautrat was named to the roster for the 2016 SheBelieves Cup that took place from March 3 to 9. She played all 90 minutes in the team's opening match of the tournament on March 3 against England. On March 6, Gautrat earned her 50th cap with the national team during the match against France, a 1–0 victory for the United States. She became the 52nd United States female player to make 50 appearances. Gautrat played 90 minutes in the final against Germany on March 9, helping the United States win the 2016 SheBelieves Cup. Gautrat joined a 23-player roster for a training camp ahead of two matches against Colombia in early April. She did not play in either game due to a hamstring injury. Gautrat was on the roster for another two-game series against Japan in early June and she started in both games.

On July 12, 2016, Gautrat was named to the 18-player team that would represent the United States at the 2016 Olympic Games in Rio de Janeiro. She made her Olympic debut on August 3 in the team's opening match against New Zealand. She recorded an assist during the match on Alex Morgan's goal in the 46th minute. She also appeared in the second group match against France, helping the United States take away another victory and secure their first-place finish in the group.

==== Post-Olympics and injury struggles ====
Despite the loss at the Olympics, Gautrat would end 2016 strong, scoring in both games in a series of friendlies against Romania Gautrat would play in the 2017 SheBelieves Cup but would suffer a minor knee injury that would cause her to miss a series of friendlies against Russia the following month as well as friendlies against Sweden and Norway in June. Gautrat would return in the 2017 Tournament of Nations but would play only as a late game sub against Australia. Gautrat would spend the rest of 2017 in and out of training camps due to nagging injuries and would sparingly find playing minutes as a late game sub. These injuries would carry over into 2018 as Gautrat was left out of the team's January camp. Gautrat would return for the 2018 SheBelieves Cup and would be used as either a starter or a substitute player through the remaining games of the first half of the year. Gautrat's health woes would continue in the 2018 CONCACAF Women's Championship as she suffered a head injury against Jamaica and would be forced to leave the match. Gautrat ended 2018 not on the roster for friendlies in Europe at the end of the year, marking the end of an inconsistent and injury filled second half to the year.

Gautrat's ongoing injury concerns remained an issue going into the 2019 calendar year. She was included in the team's 26-player January camp that took place abroad in Algarve, Portugal, where team then travelled to face both France and Spain in a set of friendlies. She started and played a full 90 minutes in the team's 3–1 loss to France on January 19 in La Havre, but she did not dress in the team's 1–0 win over Spain in Alicante on January 22. Following this trip abroad with the team, Gautrat was not included in the following 23-player camp for the 2019 SheBelieves Cup that took place from February 27 – March 5. She also was left off the 24-player roster for the team's next camp that featured home friendlies against Australia on April 4 and Belgium on April 7.

==== 2019 FIFA Women's World Cup ====
On May 2, 2019, Gautrat was named to the 23-player roster that would represent the United States at the 2019 FIFA Women's World Cup. She was regarded by many as a surprise selection for the tournament, having not been able to be with the team for about 4 months prior to the selection of the final roster. She failed to make an appearance in any of the team's three send off matches that were against South Africa on May 12, New Zealand on May 16, and Mexico on May 26.

Gautrat made only one appearance at the 2019 FIFA Women's World Cup, where she featured in the team's second group stage match, vs Chile in Paris on June 16. She started and played all 90 minutes in the team's 3–0 win over the South American World Cup debutants. On July 7, she became a two time World Cup champion after the team's 2–0 defeat of the Netherlands in Lyon.

==== Post 2019 World Cup – present ====
Gautrat scored her 7th and 8th international goals in the months following the United States' 2019 FIFA Women's World Cup victory; in matches against Portugal on August 29, and Costa Rica on November 10. On January 17, 2020, Gautrat was not included in the United States final 20-player squad for the 2020 CONCACAF Women's Olympic Qualifying Championship that took place through February 9. Following that decision, Gautrat then entered a two-year long period where she was not called in to the United States national team, as she did not appear in the team for the remainder of 2020 and all of 2021. Subsequently, she was not chosen to represent the United States at the delayed 2020 Olympic Games in Tokyo, Japan. On January 13, 2022, Gautrat received a last minute call up to the team's January training camp to replace an injured Imani Dorsey. Following the conclusion of that camp, Gautrat was included in the United States 23-player roster for the 2022 SheBelieves Cup announced on February 3. She made her return to the team with a start and a 45-minute appearance in a 0–0 draw vs Czech Republic on February 17. Gautrat did not feature in the remainder of the tournament due to an injury, but took home the SheBelieves Cup trophy for the third time in her career following the team's 5–0 win over Iceland on February 23.

== Career statistics ==
=== Club summary ===
As of match played 2 May 2026

Club	Season	League			Cup (Note: Includes Coupe de France and NWSL Challenge Cup)		Playoffs (Note: Includes NWSL Playoffs)		Continental		Other		Total	
Club	Season	Division	Apps	Goals	Apps	Goals	Apps	Goals	Apps	Goals	Apps	Goals	Apps	Goals
Houston Dash	2015	NWSL	10	0	—		—		—		—		10	0
Houston Dash	2016	NWSL	13	0	—		—		—		—		13	0
Houston Dash	2017	NWSL	10	0	—		—		—		—		10	0
Houston Dash	Total		33	0	0	0	0	0	0	0	0	0	33	0
Chicago Red Stars	2017	NWSL	2	0	—		0	0	—		—		2	0
Chicago Red Stars	2018	NWSL	9	0	—		1	0	—		—		10	0
Chicago Red Stars	2019	NWSL	13	1	—		2	0	—		—		15	1
Chicago Red Stars	2020	NWSL	— (Note: The 2020 NWSL regular season and playoffs were canceled due to the COVID-19 pandemic.)		3	1	—		—		4 (Note: Fall Series)	1	7	2
Chicago Red Stars	2021	NWSL	21	2	4	1	3	0	—		—		28	3
Chicago Red Stars	2022	NWSL	5	0	2	0	1	0	—		—		8	0
Chicago Red Stars	Total		50	3	9	2	7	0	0	0	4	1	70	6
Olympique Lyonnais	2017–18	D1 Féminine	4	1	1	1	—		0	0	—		5	2
Kansas City Current	2023	NWSL	5	0	2	0	—		—		—		7	0
Orlando Pride	2024	NWSL	17	0	—		2	0	—		3 (Note: Includes the 2024 NWSL x Liga MX Femenil Summer Cup)	0	22	0
Orlando Pride	2025	NWSL	1	0	1	0	—		—		—		2	0
Orlando Pride	Total		18	0	1	0	0	0	0	0	3	0	24	0
Newcastle United	2025-2026	WSL2	11	1	0	0	—		—		—		11	1
Career total			113	4	13	3	9	0	0	0	7	1	150	9

=== International summary ===
As of February 17, 2022

Appearances and goals by national team and year
National team	Year	Apps	Goals
United States	2013	3	1
United States	2014	16	2
United States	2015	24	1
United States	2016	20	2
United States	2017	6	0
United States	2018	12	0
United States	2019	6	2
United States	2020	0	0
United States	2021	0	0
United States	2022	1	0
Total		88	8

=== International goals ===
As of match played November 10, 2019. United States score listed first, score column indicates score after each Gautrat goal.

No.	Date	Cap	Venue	Opponent	Score	Result	Competition
1	September 3, 2013	2	RFK Stadium, Washington, D.C., United States	Mexico	7–0	7–0	Friendly
2	February 13, 2014	5	Georgia Dome, Atlanta, GA, United States	Russia	5–0	8–0	Friendly
3	October 20, 2014	14	RFK Stadium, Washington, D.C., United States	Haiti	6–0	6–0	2014 CONCACAF Women's Championship
4	April 4, 2015	26	Busch Stadium, St. Louis, MO, United States	New Zealand	4–0	4–0	Friendly
5	November 10, 2016	62	Avaya Stadium, San Jose, CA, United States	Romania	3–0	8–1	Friendly
6	November 13, 2016	63	StubHub Center, Carson, CA, United States	Romania	4–0	5–0	Friendly
7	August 29, 2019	84	Lincoln Financial Field, Philadelphia, PA, United States	Portugal	2–0	4–0	Friendly
8	November 10, 2019	87	TIAA Bank Field, Jacksonville, FL, United States	Costa Rica	2–0	6–0	Friendly

== Personal life ==
Gautrat is a Christian. Gautrat is a member of the Fellowship of Christian Athletes.

She was in a relationship with Eric Bird from 2013 to 2015. She married soccer player Fabrice Gautrat in November 2017. On June 27, 2020, she wore a jersey with "Gautrat" as her name during the NWSL Challenge Cup, reportedly "to surprise her husband."

== Honors and awards ==
Lyon

- Division 1 Féminine: 2017–18

Orlando Pride

- NWSL Shield: 2024
- NWSL Championship: 2024

United States U20

- CONCACAF Women's U-20 Championship: 2012
- FIFA U-20 Women's World Cup: 2012

United States

- CONCACAF Women's Championship: 2014, 2018
- Algarve Cup: 2015
- FIFA Women's World Cup: 2015, 2019
- CONCACAF Women's Olympic Qualifying Tournament: 2016
- She Believes Cup: 2016; 2018; 2022
- Tournament of Nations: 2018

Individual

- Parade National Player of the Year: 2010
- NSCAA Youth Player of the Year: 2010
- NSCAA High School and Youth All-American: 2010
- ESPN Rise All-American: 2010
- Gatorade Georgia State Player of the Year: 2010, 2011
- Soccer America National Freshman of the Year: 2011
- NSCAA All-American First Team: 2011, 2013, 2014
- Soccer America First Team MVP: 2011
- MAC Hermann Trophy Semi-finalist: 2011
- NSCAA All-Southeast Region First Team: 2011, 2012, 2013, 2014
- ACC Freshman of the Year: 2011
- All-ACC First Team: 2011, 2012, 2013, 2014
- VaSID State Freshman of the Year: 2011
- ACC Tournament MVP: 2012
- Soccer America Second Team MVP: 2012
- TopDrawerSoccer.com Team of the Season, Second Team: 2012
- VaSID All-State First Team: 2012
- MAC Hermann Trophy Winner: 2013, 2014
- Soccer America Player of the Year: 2013
- TopDrawerSoccer.com Player of the Year: 2013
- Honda Award Nominee 2013, 2014
- Soccer America First Team MVP: 2013, 2014
- TopDrawer Soccer.com Best XI First Team: 2013
- College Soccer Madness All-American First Team: 2013
- VaSID State Player of the Year: 2013, 2014
- All-NCAA Tournament Team: 2013, 2014
- ACC All-Tournament Team: 2013, 2014
- Virginia Nike Soccer Classic All-Tournament Team: 2013
- TopDrawerSoccer.com Preseason Best XI First Team: 2013, 2014
- TopDrawerSoccer.com National Player of the Year Award: 2014
- NWSL Team of the Month: September 2019, July 2021, September 2021, October 2021
- U.S. Soccer Young Female Athlete of the Year Finalist: 2013
- 2016 CONCACAF Women's Olympic Qualifying Championship Golden Ball Winner

== In popular culture ==
=== Video games ===
Gautrat was featured along with her national teammates in the EA Sports' FIFA video game series in FIFA 16, the first time women players were included in the game.

=== Ticker-tape parade and White House honor ===
Following the United States' win at the 2015 FIFA Women's World Cup, Gautrat and her teammates became the first women's sports team to be honored with a Ticker tape parade in New York City. Each player received a key to the city from Mayor Bill de Blasio. In October of the same year, the team was honored by President Barack Obama at the White House.
