= Cami Privett =

American soccer player (b. 1993)

Personal information
- Full name: Cambria Danielle Privett
- Date of birth: March 16, 1993 (age 33)
- Place of birth: Bakersfield, California, United States
- Height: 5 ft 8 in (1.73 m)
- Position: Midfielder

College career
Years	Team	Apps	(Gls)
2011–2014	UC Irvine Anteaters	42	(7)

Senior career*
Years	Team	Apps	(Gls)
2015	Houston Dash	4	(0)
2015	Kolbotn	11	(3)
2016–2017	Houston Dash	31	(0)
2018–2019	Logroño	12	(1)
2019–2021	Houston Dash	4	(0)
- * Club domestic league appearances and goals as of August 11, 2021

Cambria Danielle Privett (born March 16, 1993, Bakersfield, CA) is an American soccer player who plays as a midfielder.

== Playing career ==
=== UC Irvine Anteaters, 2011–2014 ===
Privett attended UC Irvine where played for the Anteaters from 2011 to 2014 and studied Sociology. As a freshman, Privett was named the Big West Conference Freshman of the Year and second team All-Big West. She scored five goals, two game-winners, and assisted on five while registering 14 shots, 9 of which were on goal. During her sophomore season, she started 13 of the 16 matches she played in, recording on assist and seven shots, 5 of which were on goal. As a junior, Privett started 15 of the 16 matches she played, scoring 2 goals and 2 assists, with 17 shots, 7 of which were on goal.

=== Houston Dash, 2015–2017 ===
In 2015, Privett played for the Houston Dash as an amateur player. Privett made the Houston Dash's amateur squad after paying a $75 fee to attend an open tryout. After getting an invitation to attend the Dash pre-season, she cancelled her plans to try out for other squads and focused on making the Dash. Between injuries, trades, and the Women's World Cup, Privett became needed in the midfield and made her NWSL debut as a 58th-minute substitute against FC Kansas City on May 2.

Dash head coach Randy Waldrum said of Privett making the squad: "Cami is kind of a dream story where, I think, I'll go to the open tryouts and pay $75 to go try out, and, all of the sudden, the next thing I know, a few months later, I'm playing in my first pro game. You'd never know that around her; the moment doesn't seem to faze her."

During the Dash's offseason, Privett played for the Norwegian club Kolbotn, as a Dash teammate, Rachel Axon, had played there the previous offseason. Although the language barrier made training difficult, Privett was able to score goals, get starts, get minutes, and worked on catching up on the "speed of play coming from college... is the biggest difference." Of the difference in styles, Privett said that Kolbotn "play[s] a lot more direct then we do here [at the Dash]."

In February 2016, Privett signed a professional contract with the Dash. She made her season debut for the club in the Dash's 0–0 draw against Sky Blue FC. Privett played in 15 of 20 games for the Dash during the 2016 season, recording 11 starts and tallied 1,059 total minutes.

While the Dash had 7 players at the 2016 Olympics, Privett was asked to make a start at the right back position against the Portland Thorns on July 16. Privett had only played on the outside for one season: when she was a freshman at California-Irvine, she played wide midfield. "We felt like we needed her on the field," Waldrum said, "Missing our national team players, it is about figuring out how we get the best 11 on the field at the same time. If I had put her at center back, then I have to sit Ellie (Brush) or Cari (Roccaro). If I put her at holding midfield, I have to sit Amber (Brooks). All of those players, we need." Privett did well in this position, and continued to be utilized as a rotating substitute or starter at the position for the remainder of the 2016 season.

During the 2016 offseason, Privett focused on improving her skills as a defensive back, continuing her transition from midfield to out-side defensive back to center back.

As part of Randy Waldrum's experimentation with the Dash's backline in 2017 (that saw Rocarro, Bruna, Van Wyk, Polianna, Levin, Privett, and Daly all get starts), Privett started twice at the center back position on May 20 at Sky Blue and May 27 vs Seattle. Interim-head coach Omar Gonzalez solidified this back line with Levin-Van Wyk-Brooks-Poliana after a shutout victory in Orlando on June 24, starting a 6-game unbeaten streak for the Dash. With Morgan Brian suffering from injuries and Amber Brookes playing on the backline, Privett started at the defending midfield position on July 2 at Kansas City, June 8 vs Portland, and June 15 vs Washington. On June 22 vs Boston, she played defensive midfield as a 60th minute sub for Morgan Brian.

On March 9, 2018, Privett announced her retirement.

=== EDF Logroño, 2018–2019 ===
After announcing her retirement in March 2018, Privett returned to professional soccer on December 11, 2018, as she signed with EDF Logroño in the Spanish Primera División. She left the team at the end of the season.

=== Houston Dash 2019–2021 ===
In July 2019, the Houston Dash announced that Cami Privett is rejoining the team as a supplemental roster player.

== Honors ==
Houston Dash

- NWSL Challenge Cup: 2020
