= Poliana (footballer) =

Brazilian footballer

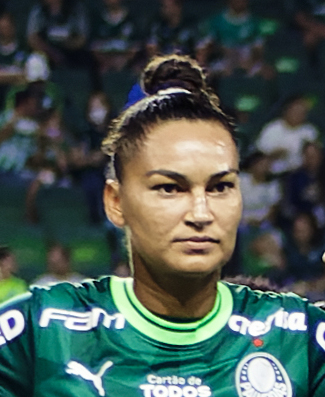
- Poliana playing for Palmeiras in 2023

Personal information
- Full name: Poliana Barbosa Medeiros
- Date of birth: 6 February 1991 (age 35)
- Place of birth: Ituiutaba, Brazil
- Height: 1.74 m (5 ft 8 1/2 in)
- Position: Right back

Team information
- Current team: Palmeiras
- Number: 3

Senior career*
Years	Team	Apps	(Gls)
- América/Juventude
2009	Santos		
2010–2014	São José	12	(3)
2015	Stjarnan	5	(3)
2016–2017	Houston Dash	37	(5)
2018	Orlando Pride	10	(0)
2019	São José	17	(1)
2020–2021	Corinthians	15	(1)
2022	São José	15	(1)
2023–	Palmeiras	20	(2)

International career^{‡}
2010	Brazil U20	1	(0)
2012–	Brazil	41	(2)
Medal record
Women's football
Representing Brazil
Pan American Games
Gold medal – first place	2015 Toronto	Team
- * Club domestic league appearances and goals as of 00:35, 25 April 2024 ‡ National team caps and goals as of 00:35, 25 April 2024

Poliana Barbosa Medeiros (born 6 February 1991), known as Poliana, is a Brazilian football defender who plays for Palmeiras and the Brazil women's national football team.

== Club career ==
=== Santos ===
Poliana signed for Santos in 2009 after a successful trial period.

=== First spell at São José ===
After moving on to São José, Poliana won the Copa Libertadores Femenina three times in 2011, 2013 and 2014. She scored two goals in the 2014 final.

In December 2014, Poliana played for São José in the 2014 International Women's Club Championship, which they won by thrashing English wild-card entrant Arsenal Ladies 2–0 in the final.

=== Houston Dash ===
Later that month, she agreed a transfer to the United States, with National Women's Soccer League (NWSL) team Houston Dash.

Before Poliana could play for Houston, she was included in an 18-month residency programme intended to prepare Brazil's national team for the 2015 FIFA Women's World Cup in Canada and the 2016 Rio Olympics.

Poliana made her league debut against Chicago Red Stars on 17 April 2016. She scored her first league goal against Orlando Pride on 4 September 2016, scoring in the 48th minute.

=== Stjarnan ===
In July 2015, Poliana agreed to play for Icelandic Úrvalsdeild club Stjarnan in their UEFA Women's Champions League qualifiers the following month. She scored on her league debut against Valur on 6 August 2015, scoring in the 59th minute.

=== Orlando Pride ===
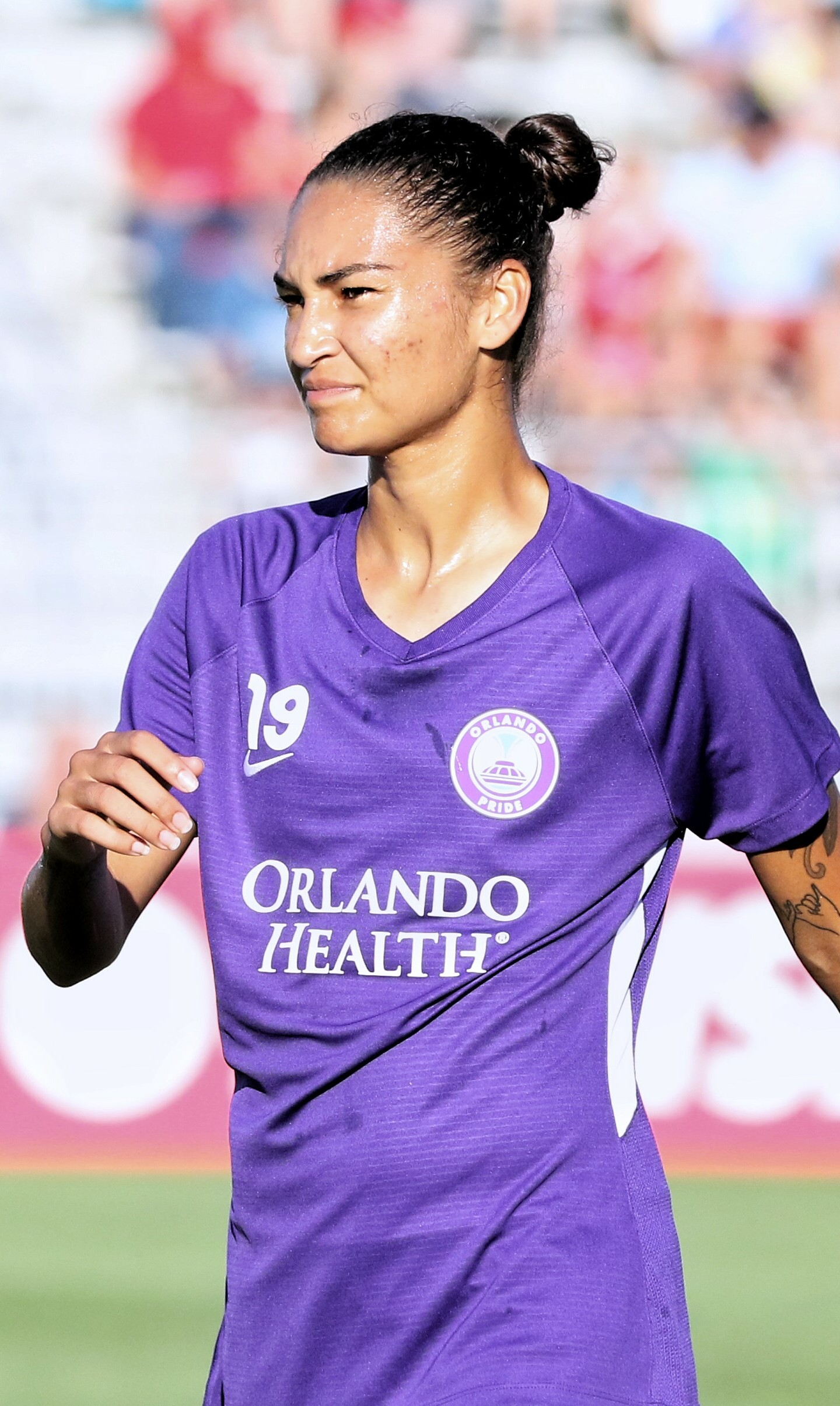
Poliana playing for Orlando Pride in 2018

On 6 February 2018, Poliana was traded by the Dash to the Orlando Pride for a second-round pick in the 2019 NWSL College Draft. She made her league debut against Utah Royals on 24 March 2018. Poliana was waived at the end of the season having made 10 appearances.

=== Second spell at São José ===
During her second spell at the club, Poliana made her league debut against Minas Brasilia on 16 March 2019. She scored her first league goal against Corinthians on 14 August 2019, scoring in the 24th minute.

=== Corinthians ===
Poliana made her league debut against Avaí on 13 February 2020.

=== Third spell at São José ===
Poliana was announced at São José on 15 Jan 2022. During her third spell at the club, she scored on her league debut against Avaí on 5 March 2022, scoring in the 2nd minute.

=== Palmeiras ===
Poliana was announced at Palmeiras on 15 August 2022. She scored on her league debut against Real Ariquemes on 26 February 2023, scoring in the 71st minute.

During her spell at Palmeiras, she became the first women's player to win 5 Libertadores.

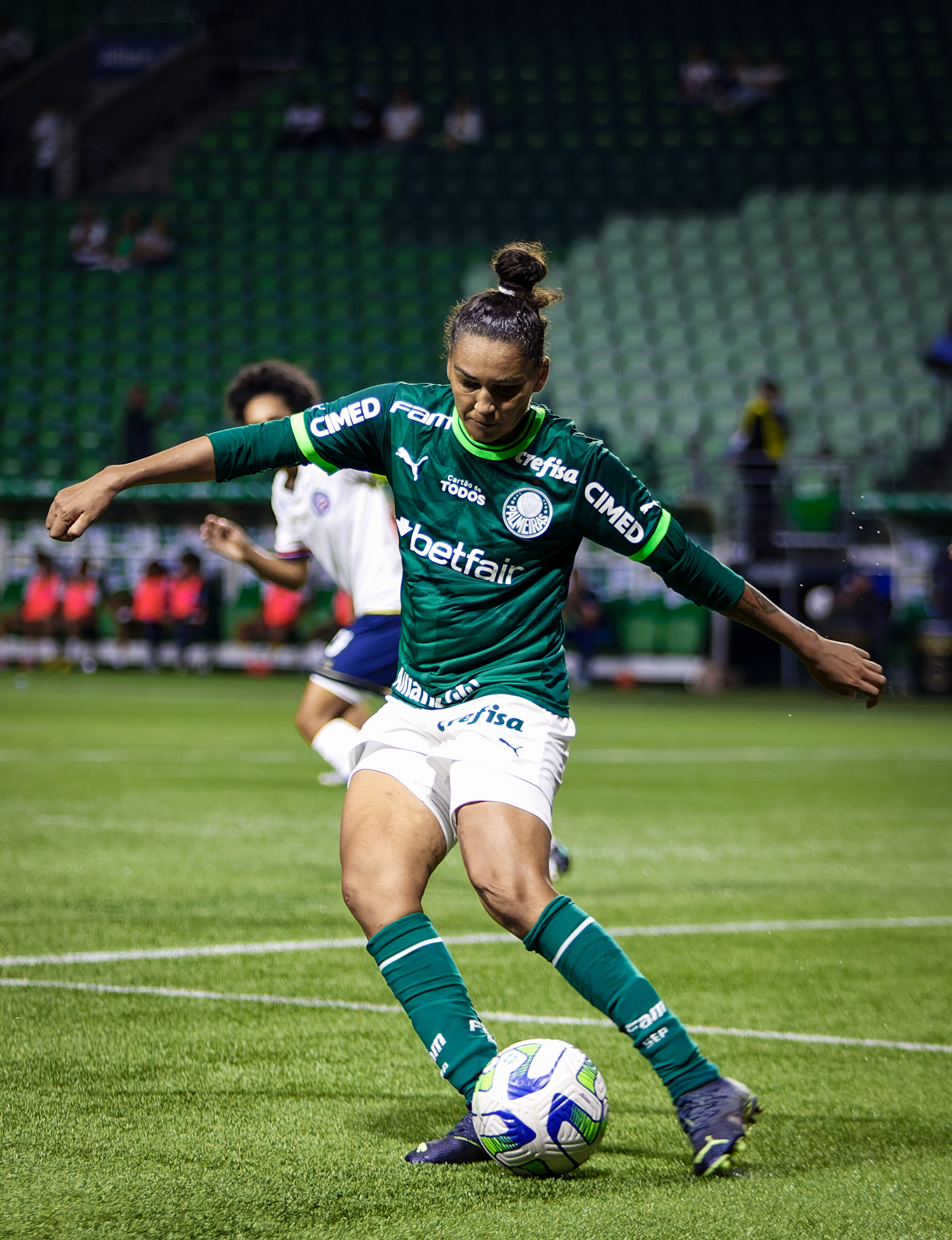
Poliana playing for Palmeiras in 2023

== International career ==
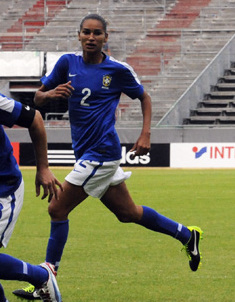
Poliana representing Brazil in a match against Sweden

Poliana made her debut against North Korea U20s on 13 July 2010.

After representing Brazil at the 2010 edition of the FIFA U-20 Women's World Cup, Poliana made her senior debut at the 2012 Torneio Internacional Cidade de São Paulo de Futebol Feminino.

Poliana was not included in Brazil's initial squad for the 2019 FIFA Women's World Cup, but received a late call-up when Fabiana withdrew with a thigh injury.

=== International goals ===
Goal	Date	Location	Opponent	#	Score	Result	Competition
1	2014-03-10	Santiago, Chile	Venezuela	1.1	4–0	5–0	South American Games 2014
2	2014-03-16	Santiago, Chile	Venezuela	1.1	2–0	2–0	South American Games 2014
3	2015-09-19	Le Havre, France	France	1.1	1–2	1–2	Friendly game
4	2015-12-01	Cuiabá, Brazil	New Zealand	1.1	1–1	5–1	Friendly game
5	2015-12-13	Natal, Brazil	Mexico	1.1	6–0	6–0	Torneio Internacional Natal 2015
