= Randy Waldrum =

American soccer player and coach

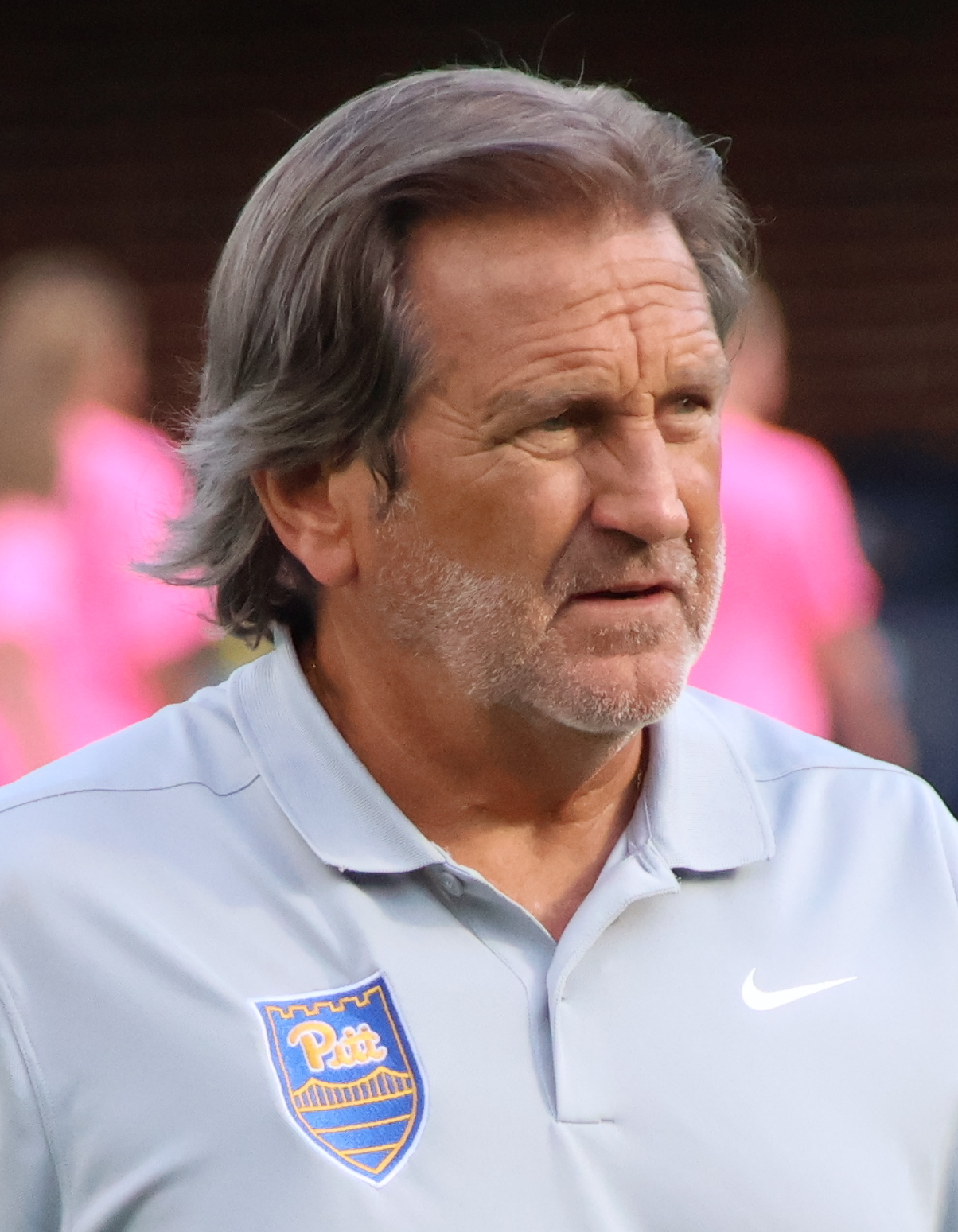
- Randy Waldrum (2025)

Personal information
- Full name: Randy Marlon Waldrum
- Date of birth: September 25, 1956 (age 70)
- Place of birth: Irving, Texas, United States
- Position: Midfielder

College career
Years	Team	Apps	(Gls)
1979–1981	Midwestern State University		

Senior career*
Years	Team	Apps	(Gls)
- Los Angeles Skyhawks
- Indianapolis Daredevils
- New York Cosmos

Managerial career
- 1978–1989: Pittsburg State (women)
- 1989–1994: Tulsa (men)
- 1989–1994: Tulsa (women)
- 1996–1998: Baylor (women)
- 1999–2013: Notre Dame (women)
- 2014–2016: Trinidad and Tobago (women)
- 2014–2017: Houston Dash
- 2018–2025: Pittsburgh (women)
- 2020–2023: Nigeria (women)
- 2023: Nigeria (women)
- * Club domestic league appearances and goals

Randy Marlon Waldrum (born September 25, 1956) is an American former professional soccer player, current technical director of University of Pittsburgh Panthers women's soccer team, and was the head coach of the Nigeria women's national team.

== Coaching career ==
He started his coaching career at Austin College in 1982, leading the men's soccer team to a 4–12–1 record. In 1988, he was the head men's soccer coach at Texas Wesleyan University, and compiled a 6–10 record. From 1989 to 1994, he coached both the men's and women's soccer teams at the University of Tulsa. He posted a 66–33–6 record with the men, and a 61–36–9 record with the women. In 1996, he founded the Baylor University women's soccer program, and went 46–14–3 from 1996 to 1998. He was the head women's soccer coach at the University of Notre Dame from 1999 through 2013, where the team's record in 15 seasons was 292–58–17.

Waldrum led the Notre Dame women's soccer team to two national championships, in 2004 and 2010. The 2010 title game was his 300th match at Notre Dame.

The National Women's Soccer League 2014 expansion team Houston Dash named Waldrum as the team's first head coach. Waldrum signed a three-year contract ahead of the 2014 season and a one-year extension for the 2017 season, but left as head coach on May 29, 2017, after the seventh week of the 2017 season. Under Waldrum, the Dash had a 19–39–13 record and did not make the league playoffs.

Waldrum was fired as the Trinidad and Tobago women's national team coach in January 2016.

In October 2017, Waldrum was appointed to be technical adviser and head coach of the Nigeria women's national team, and was expected to take charge of the team ahead of the 2018 Africa Women Cup of Nations qualification tournament. However, he turned down the role and was not appointed coach.

In December 2017, Waldrum was appointed as the head coach of the Pittsburgh Panthers.

On October 5, 2020, Waldrum was appointed the head coach of Nigeria women's national team, barely three years after turning down the role.

Waldrum was promoted to Technical Director of the Pittsburgh program on May 22, 2025, relinquishing his head coaching role.

== Personal life ==
Waldrum is a native of Irving, Texas, and graduated from MacArthur High School in 1975. He was inducted into the Irving Independent School District Athletic Hall of Fame in 2014. He and his wife Dianna have one son, Ben Waldrum, who is head coach under his father for the Pittsburgh Panthers.

== See also ==
- List of college women's soccer career coaching wins leaders
