= 2023 NJ/NY Gotham FC season =

NJ/NY Gotham FC's fourteenth season

NJ/NY Gotham FC
2023 season
- Managing owner: Ed Nalbandian
- General manager: Yael Averbuch West
- Head coach: Juan Carlos Amorós
- Stadium: Red Bull Arena; Harrison, New Jersey; (Capacity: 25,000)
- League: 6th
- Challenge Cup: Group Stage
- Playoffs: Champions
- Top goalscorer: League: Lynn Williams (7); All: Lynn Williams (9)
- Highest home attendance: 15,058; (Jun 5 vs. SD)
- Lowest home attendance: 3,200; (Apr 22 vs. NC)
- Average home league attendance: 6,293
- Biggest win: 4–1; (May 21 vs. RGN)
- Biggest defeat: 0–2; (two matches)
Home colors	Away colors
- All statistics correct as of October 16, 2023.

The 2023 NJ/NY Gotham FC season was the team's 14th season as a professional women's soccer team and eleventh participating in the National Women's Soccer League (NWSL), the top tier of women's soccer in the United States. Gotham FC defeated OL Reign in the championship, winning the team's second championship (and the first under the current name and under its participation with the NWSL).

== Background ==
=== Coaching changes ===
On November 1, 2022, Gotham FC hired Houston Dash manager Juan Carlos Amorós. He succeeded interim head coach Hue Menzies, who had served since August 13, 2022.

=== Notable offseason transactions ===
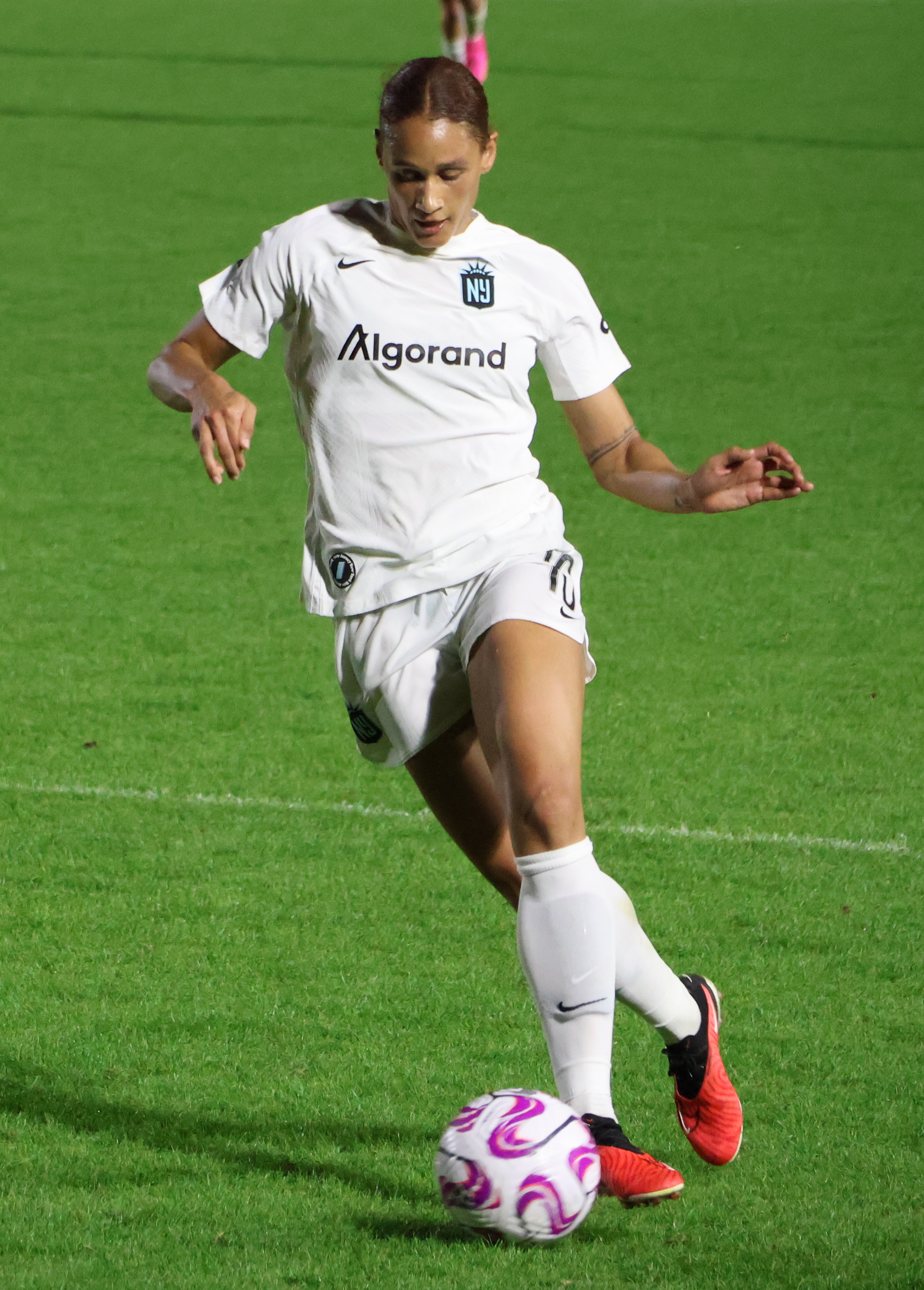
On January 12, 2023, Gotham FC acquired Lynn Williams via trade from Kansas City Current.

On November 15, 2022, Gotham FC made the first domestic free agency acquisition in the league's history by signing Washington Spirit and United States women's national soccer team defender Kelley O'Hara to a two-year contract. O'Hara had last played for the club from 2013 to 2017, before its rebranding from Sky Blue FC.

On November 16, goalkeeper Ashlyn Harris retired to join Gotham FC's front office.

On November 28, Gotham signed free-agent goalkeeper Abby Smith of Portland Thorns FC to a three-year contract. Smith would become Gotham's starting goalkeeper in eight of its first nine matches across competitions, winning week 7 NWSL Player of the Week and NWSL Save of the Week honors for her performance in a May 14 shutout draw against Orlando Pride.

On December 1, free-agent defender Estelle Johnson signed a two-year contract with North Carolina Courage.

On January 12, 2023, the day of the 2023 NWSL Draft, Gotham FC traded its second-overall selection to Kansas City Current in exchange for forward Lynn Williams, who had missed most of the 2022 season with a hamstring injury. Williams was in New Zealand for training camp with the United States national team during the trade and had not been aware of Kansas City's intent to trade her. The terms of the trade required Williams's approval, which she granted with three minutes to spare before the league deadline. Williams would go on to score more league goals by May than any Gotham player had scored in the 2022 season.

At the draft, Gotham selected Hermann Trophy finalist and Florida State 2021 national championship winner Jenna Nighswonger with the fourth-overall pick. Nighswonger scored her first NWSL goal in the 5th minute of a 2–1 road win against Chicago Red Stars on May 7. Gotham had acquired the pick by trading forward Paige Monaghan, $150,000 in allocation money, and a 2023 international roster spot to Racing Louisville FC.

Gotham invited retired player Sinead Farrelly to training camp and subsequently signed her to a one-year contract with a second-year option on March 25. Farrelly had not played in the NWSL since 2015. She then was selected for and debuted with the Ireland national team in a friendly against the United States on April 8, 2023.

=== New kit ===
Gotham announced new home football kits on March 6, 2023, featuring a teal lightning-bolt motif on black. The kits retained the Algorand front-of-shirt sponsorship, and Carmax and Ally Financial sleeve sponsorships. Like all NWSL kits, Gotham's are manufactured by Nike, Inc.

== Summary ==
=== March/April ===
On March 23, three days before Gotham's season-opening, defender Ali Krieger announced on CBS Mornings that she would retire after the season's conclusion.

Gotham FC opened its season on March 26 with a 2–1 win on the road in front of a sell-out crowd at Angel City FC, in a match that also featured the league's first use of video assistant referee in the regular season that denied the Los Angeles team a goal. Newly signed striker Lynn Williams scored her first goal for Gotham in the 64th minute of her debut with the club, despite injuring her arm in the first half and requiring a splint to be applied mid-game. The goal held up as the match winner. Williams celebrated her goal by gesturing bat ears on her forehead and flapping her arms, along with the rallying call "go bats". Williams' teammate Smith later adopted the celebration after scoring a goal. When asked about playing through the injury in a post-match interview, Williams said, "It's an arm. I need my legs to play soccer, not my arm." Her performance earned Williams the season's first NWSL Player of the Week award.

Gotham lost its first match of the season 0–2 in its home opener against OL Reign on April 1, following a 90-minute weather delay. The match featured the Gotham debut of Sinead Farrelly for her first NWSL match since 2015, and the home return of Allie Long following her maternity leave in the 2022 season.

Returning to the road, Gotham defeated Orlando Pride 2–0 on April 15, registering 20 shots and 10 corners while Abby Smith was credited with 5 saves in the clean-sheet performance. Both of Gotham's goals were scored during 18 minutes of second-half stoppage time: a penalty kick from a handball foul in the box confirmed via video assistant referee in the 10th minute of stoppage and scored by Margaret Purce, and a second goal scored by Williams in the 17th minute of stoppage. Each goal successively set the league record for latest goals scored in a match.

On April 19, Gotham won its 2023 NWSL Challenge Cup opening match against Washington Spirit 1–0 on a 56th-minute Williams goal. Then on April 23, in its third match in 7 days, Gotham defeated North Carolina Courage 1–0 at home thanks to an 80th-minute Williams goal. The match was delayed by weather for two hours at halftime. Williams's goal was her 60th, making her the third player after Sam Kerr and Christine Sinclair to reach the mark; Sinclair had done so on the same day in a match against Racing Louisville FC hours before. Williams won her second NWSL Player of the Week award of the season for her performance.

Gotham ended April with its second loss, conceding two late goals to Kansas City Current's Debinha in an 0–2 shutout on April 30 at the Current's Children's Mercy Park.

On May 3, the NWSL named Williams to its Best XI of March/April.

==== Transactions ====
On April 25, Gotham FC waived backup goalkeeper and 2022 NWSL Draft selection Hensley Hancuff.

On April 27, Gotham FC traded midfielder Victoria Pickett to the North Carolina Courage in exchange for $200,000 in allocation money. Gotham had acquired Pickett in August 2022 from Kansas City Current in exchange for $200,000 in allocation money and a first-round selection in the 2023 NWSL Draft, and had re-signed Pickett to a three-year contract in December 2022.

=== May ===
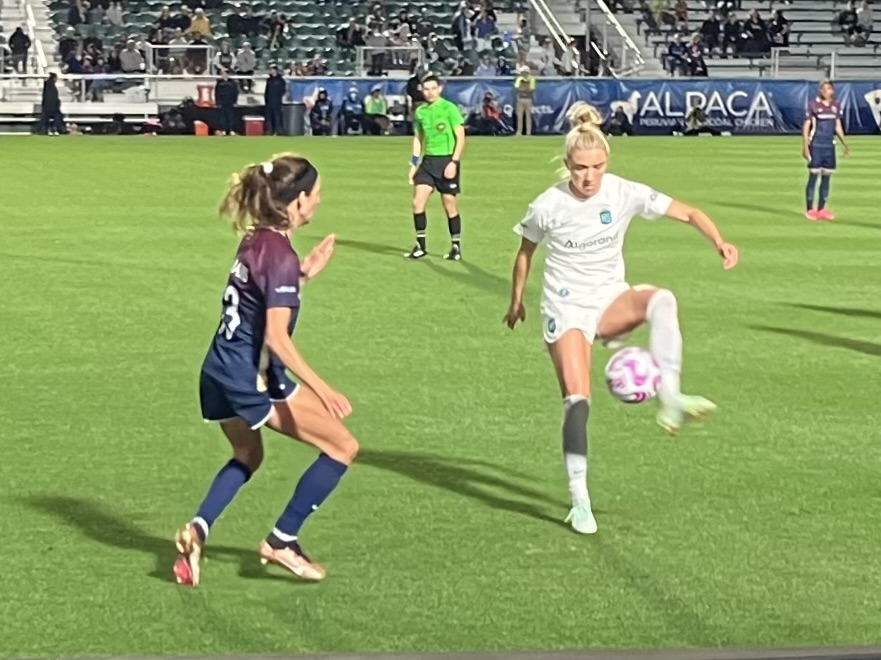
Gotham FC drew against North Carolina Courage in their second match of the 2023 NWSL Challenge Cup.

On May 3, Michelle Betos made her first start of the season in goal for a 1–1 Challenge Cup draw against North Carolina. After a third-minute Courage goal by Mille Gejl, Betos saved an 11th-minute penalty kick that resulted from a handball call in the box confirmed by the video assistant referee. In the 65th minute, the referee also showed Betos a red card that was overturned by the video assistant referee. Williams, entering as a substitute, scored the equalizer in the 74th minute.

On May 7, Williams scored her 103rd total goal or assist in all competitions during Gotham's 2–1 win over Chicago Red Stars, surpassing Sam Kerr for the league record. Gotham followed the win with a draw at home against Orlando Pride, where Abby Smith held Orlando scoreless in a six-save effort that earned her both NWSL Player and Save of the Week honors.

On May 21, Gotham defeated OL Reign 4–1 to ascend to the top of the table, completing a worst-to-first turnaround from their last-place finish in the 2022 season and marking their first time leading the league's standings since 2013. Williams scored in the game, which took place on her 30th birthday, marking the third time she scored a goal on her birthday in her NWSL career. Bruninha and Taylor Smith each scored their first goals of the season in the match, and Nighswonger scored her second. Williams won her third NWSL Player of the Week award of the season for her performance. Gotham's fifth win and 16th point in the standings also exceeded the team's totals of four wins and 13 points during the 2022 season.

On May 23, Gotham announced that it had sold more than 10,000 tickets for its June 4 match against San Diego Wave FC, breaking the team's all-time ticket sales record of 9,500 set by then-Sky Blue FC's August 18, 2019, match against OL Reign.

On May 24, Gotham announced a partnership with S.L. Benfica that would allow Benfica to recruit Gotham FC players and for Gotham to access Benfica's academy and development systems.

=== June ===
On June 4, Gotham broke their all-time home attendance record, drawing a crowd of 15,058 spectators for their match against San Diego Wave FC on the team's Pride Night. This marked the first time the club sold tickets to the upper bowl of Red Bull Arena and beat the previous attendance record of 9,415 spectators, set on August 18, 2019, while facing OL Reign. The match ended in a 0–1 loss after Makenzy Doniak scored a goal for San Diego in the 46th minute.

On June 7, the league postponed Gotham's Challenge Cup match that evening against Orlando Pride to August 9 due to poor air quality in the New York City metropolitan area.

On June 25, Gotham signed midfielder Mana Shim to a short-term injury replacement contract. Shim had last played for the Houston Dash in 2018 and was, with Farrelly, one of the whistleblowers of the 2021 NWSL abuse scandal. Shim's contract would allow her continue to chair the United States Soccer Federation's participant safety taskforce.

== Style of play ==
In its first season under manager Juan Carlos Amorós, Gotham deployed a 4–1–4–1 formation or a pressing 4–3–3 formation. The team engaged in high-pressing tactics, allowing opponents to pass the ball across their defensive half but countering aggressively when they attempt to progress the ball, and through the first half of the season had led the league in defensive actions outside of their own defensive third. Gotham's backline and goalkeeper also played relatively far up the pitch positionally. The tactic required a high defensive work rate from its wingers to provide coverage. In Gotham's May 21 win against OL Reign, Williams — a career center forward with North Carolina Courage playing as an attacking right winger for Gotham in the match — was also credited with 10 defensive recoveries, the most among Gotham's field players in the match.

== Stadium and facilities ==
Gotham FC continued to play in Red Bull Arena, their full-time home venue since 2020, and train at Red Bulls Training Facility in East Hanover, New Jersey, continuing an agreement with New York Red Bulls established in 2020. Gotham's preseason training camp took place at IMG Academy in Bradenton, Florida, from February 8 to March 3.

== Broadcasting ==
On April 1, 2023, Gotham FC announced that MSG Networks would broadcast eight home matches during the 2023 regular season. These were in addition to the league's national broadcast and streaming agreements with CBS and Paramount+ in the United States, and with The Sports Network in Canada.

== Team ==
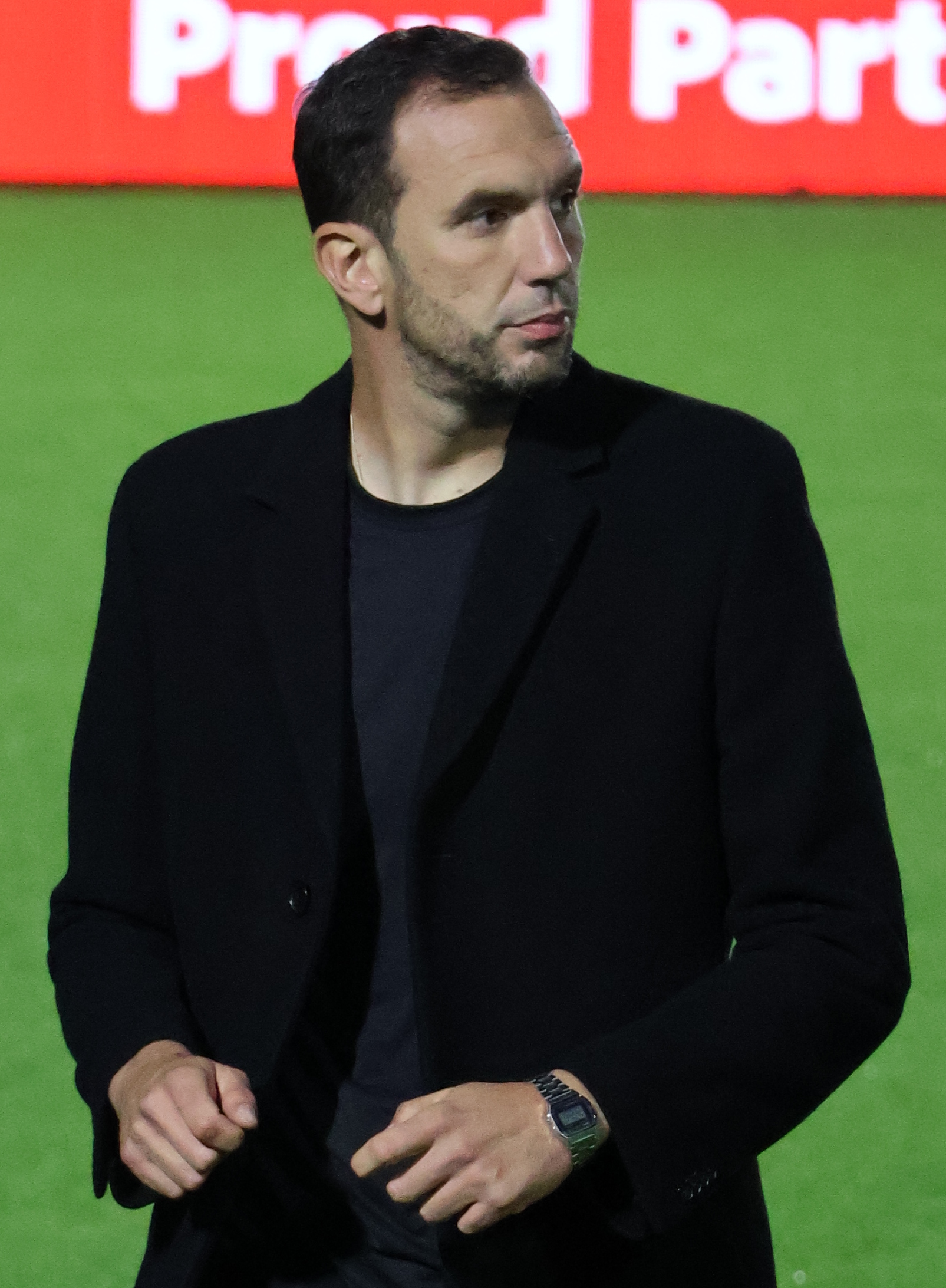
2023 was Juan Carlos Amorós's first season as manager of Gotham FC.

=== Staff ===
As of April 20, 2023

Front office staff
Role	Name
General manager Head of soccer operations	Yael Averbuch West
Acting president	Nan Vogel

Technical staff
Role	Name
Head coach	Juan Carlos Amorós
Assistant coaches	Jen Lalor
Assistant coaches	Shaun Harris
Assistant coaches	Ak Lakhani
Goalkeeper coach	Brody Sams
Head of tactical analysis	Jesús Botello Hermosa
Head of sports science	Philip Congleton
Strength and conditioning coach	Adrián Benítez Jiménez

=== Squad ===
As of July 8, 2023.

#	P.	Nation	Name	Birthday (age)	Since	Previous team	Notes
1	GK	(United States) USA	Michelle Betos	February 20, 1988 (aged 35)	2022	(United States) Racing Louisville FC	
4	GK	(United States) USA	Abby Smith	October 4, 1993 (aged 29)	2022	(United States) Portland Thorns FC	
24	GK	(United States) USA	Mandy Haught	November 3, 1998 (aged 24)	2023	(Sweden) Piteå IF	
2	DF	(United States) USA	Imani Dorsey	March 21, 1996 (aged 27)	2018	(United States) Duke University	
3	DF	(Brazil) BRA	Bruninha	June 16, 2002 (aged 20)	2022	(Brazil) Santos FC	INT (Note: INT: International player)
5	DF	(United States) USA	Kelley O'Hara	August 4, 1988 (aged 34)	2023	(United States) Washington Spirit	
11	DF	(United States) USA	Ali Krieger	July 28, 1984 (aged 38)	2022	(United States) Orlando Pride	
12	DF	(United States) USA	Kristen Edmonds	May 22, 1987 (aged 35)	2022	(United States) Kansas City Current	
14	DF	(United States) USA	Nealy Martin	April 22, 1998 (aged 24)	2022	(United States) Racing Louisville FC	
15	DF	(Mexico) MEX	Sabrina Flores	January 31, 1996 (aged 27)	2020	(Spain) Sevilla FC	
21	DF	(United States) USA	Ellie Jean	January 31, 1997 (aged 26)	2022	(Netherlands) PSV Eindhoven	
22	DF	(United States) USA	Mandy Freeman	March 23, 1995 (aged 28)	2017	(United States) University of Southern California	
6	MF	(United States) USA	Allie Long	August 13, 1987 (aged 35)	2021	(United States) OL Reign	
7	MF	(United States) USA	McCall Zerboni	December 13, 1986 (aged 36)	2020	(United States) North Carolina Courage	
8	MF	(United States) USA	Taryn Torres	August 23, 1999 (aged 23)	2021	(United States) University of Virginia	SEI (Note: SEI: Added to the season-ending injury list)
13	MF	(United States) USA	Mana Shim	September 25, 1991 (aged 31)	2023	(United States) Houston Dash	IRP (Note: IRP: Injury replacement player)
17	MF	(United States) USA	Delanie Sheehan	January 13, 1999 (aged 24)	2021	(United States) University of California, Los Angeles	
18	MF	(United States) USA	Yazmeen Ryan	February 25, 1999 (aged 24)	2023	(United States) Portland Thorns FC (via Angel City FC)	
19	MF	(United States) USA	Kristie Mewis	February 25, 1991 (aged 32)	2021	(United States) Houston Dash (via San Diego Wave FC)	
32	MF	(United States) USA	Jenna Nighswonger	February 25, 1994 (aged 29)	2020	(United States) Florida State	
33	MF	(Republic of Ireland) IRL	Sinead Farrelly	November 16, 1989 (aged 33)	2023	(United States) Boston Breakers	
77	MF	(Spain) ESP	Maitane López	March 13, 1995 (aged 28)	2023	(Spain) Atlético Madrid	INT
10	FW	(United States) USA	Lynn Williams	May 21, 1993 (aged 29)	2023	(United States) Kansas City Current	
16	FW	(Iceland) ISL	Svava Rós Guðmundsdóttir	November 11, 1995 (aged 27)	2023	(Norway) SK Brann	INT
20	FW	(United States) USA	Taylor Smith	December 1, 1993 (aged 29)	2022	(United States) North Carolina Courage	
23	FW	(United States) USA	Margaret Purce	September 18, 1995 (aged 27)	2020	(United States) Portland Thorns FC	
25	FW	(Nigeria) NGR	Ifeoma Onumonu	February 25, 1994 (aged 29)	2020	(United States) OL Reign	
28	FW	(United States) USA	Katie Stengel	February 29, 1992 (aged 31)	2023	(England) Liverpool	LOAN (Note: LOAN: On loan)

== Competitions ==
=== NWSL Challenge Cup ===
Gotham FC finished third in the East Division during the 2022 NWSL Challenge Cup and did not advance. Gotham FC returned to the East Division in the 2023 tournament.

==== Group stage ====
April 19, 2023	NJ/NY Gotham FC	1–0	Washington Spirit	Harrison, New Jersey
5:30 p.m. EDT (UTC-4)	Williams 56' (Mewis); Nighswonger (yellow card) 90'	Report	Sanchez (yellow card) 74'	Stadium: Red Bull Arena; Attendance: 7,543; Referee: Shawn Tehini

May 3, 2023	North Carolina Courage	1–1	NJ/NY Gotham FC	Cary, North Carolina
7:17 p.m. EDT (UTC-4)	Martin (yellow card) 72'; Williams 74' (Nighswonger)	Report	Gejl 3' (Wingate)	Stadium: WakeMed Soccer Park; Attendance: 2,761; Referee: Joshua Encarnación
Note: VAR awarded a penalty kick to NC at 8', but NC failed to convert it. VAR rescinded a red card issued to Betos at 67'.

July 23, 2023	Orlando Pride	1–3	NJ/NY Gotham FC	Orlando, Florida
7:00 p.m. EDT (UTC-4)	Montefusco 9' (Tymrak); Martínez (yellow card) 45+2'; Listro (yellow card) 63'	Report	Nighswonger 35' (pen.); Zerboni 55' (Nighswonger); Ryan 57' (Zerboni)	Stadium: Exploria Stadium; Attendance: 4,051; Referee: Shawn Tehini
Note: Postponed to from June 28 due to Gotham FC weather and travel delays.

July 28, 2023	Washington Spirit	4–2	NJ/NY Gotham FC	Washington, D.C.
7:00 p.m. EDT (UTC-4)	Hatch 25' (Silano), 63'; Brooks (yellow card) 49'; Biegalski 55' (Brooks); Ricketts 70' (Hatch)	Report	Purce 4'; Nighswonger 8' (Purce); Zerboni (yellow card) 45+3'	Stadium: Audi Field; Attendance: 4,732

August 5, 2023	NJ/NY Gotham FC	2–0	North Carolina Courage	Harrison, New Jersey
7:30 p.m. EDT (UTC-4)	Stengel 16' (Purce); Zerboni 59' (Sheehan) (yellow card) 80'	Report	Ratcliffe (yellow card) 36'; Pickett (yellow card) 49'	Stadium: Red Bull Arena; Attendance: 3,004

August 9, 2023	NJ/NY Gotham FC	1–1	Orlando Pride	Harrison, New Jersey
7:30 p.m. EDT (UTC-4)	Sheehan (yellow card) 53'; Shim 90+1' (Purce) (yellow card) 84'	Report	Bright 32' (Abello); Cluff (yellow card) 37'; Montefusco (yellow card) 45+3'	Stadium: Red Bull Arena; Attendance: 2,038
Note: Postponed from 7:30 p.m. EDT on June 7 due to poor air quality in the New York City metropolitan area.

==== East Division standings ====
Pos	Team	Pld	W	T	L	GF	GA	GD	Pts	Qualification	NC	NJY	WAS	ORL
1	North Carolina Courage	6	3	2	1	15	5	+10	11	Advance to knockout stage	—	1–1	6–0	0–0
2	NJ/NY Gotham FC	6	3	2	1	10	7	+3	11		2–0	—	1–0	1–1
3	Washington Spirit	6	3	0	3	10	13	−3	9		1–2	4–2	—	4–2
4	Orlando Pride	6	0	2	4	5	15	−10	2		1–1	1–3	0–1	—

Source: NWSL

==== Results by matchday ====
Matchday	1	2	3	4	5	6
Stadium	H	A	A	A	H	H
Result	W	D	W	L	W	D
Position	1	1	2			2

Updated to match(es) played on July 23, 2023. Source: NWSL
A = Away; H = Home; W = Win; D = Draw; L = Loss

=== Regular season ===
Gotham FC finished the 2022 National Women's Soccer League season in last place.

==== Matches ====
March 26, 2023 1	Angel City FC	1–2	NJ/NY Gotham FC	Los Angeles, California
	Thompson 11' (Weatherholt); Riley (yellow card) 50'; Haračić (yellow card) 54'; McCaskill (yellow card) 54'; Johnson (yellow card) 54'	Report	Ryan (yellow card) 21'; Purce 55' (pen.); Williams 65' (Purce); Bruninha (yellow card) 69'	Stadium: BMO Stadium; Attendance: 22,000; Referee: Elijio Arreguin

April 1, 2023 2	NJ/NY Gotham FC	0–2	OL Reign	Harrison, New Jersey
	Long (yellow card) 75'; Purce (yellow card) 90+4'	Report	Fishlock 31' (Lavelle); Balcer 62'	Stadium: Red Bull Arena; Attendance: 7,534; Referee: Brad Jensen

April 15, 2023 4	Orlando Pride	0–2	NJ/NY Gotham FC	Orlando, Florida
10:36 p.m. EDT (UTC−4)		Report	Ryan (yellow card) 45+1'; Farrelly (yellow card) 83'; Purce 90+10' (pen.); Williams 90+17' (Purce)	Stadium: Exploria Stadium; Attendance: 5,258; Referee: Elvis Osmanovic
Note: Kickoff delayed by weather from 4:30 p.m.

April 22, 2023 4	NJ/NY Gotham FC	1–0	North Carolina Courage	Harrison, New Jersey
7:30 p.m. EDT (UTC-4)	Long (yellow card) 5'; Williams 80' (Ryan)	Report		Stadium: Red Bull Arena; Attendance: 3,200; Referee: Matthew Thompson

April 30, 2023 5	Kansas City Current	2–0	NJ/NY Gotham FC	Kansas City, Kansas
5:00 p.m. CDT (UTC-5)	Debinha 57' (LaBonta), 61'; Rodriguez (yellow card) 81'	Report	Krieger (yellow card) 20'; Ryan (yellow card) 47'	Stadium: Children's Mercy Park; Attendance: 9,409; Referee: Adorae Monroy

May 7, 2023 6	Chicago Red Stars	1–2	NJ/NY Gotham FC	Chicago, Illinois
5:00 p.m. CDT (UTC-5)	Stevens 54' (Bianchi); Petrucelli (yellow card) 79'	Report	Nighswonger 5'; Williams 45+2' (Farrelly); Onumonu (yellow card) 79'	Stadium: SeatGeek Stadium; Attendance: 3,692; Referee: Natalie Simon

May 14, 2023 7	NJ/NY Gotham FC	0–0	Orlando Pride	Harrison, New Jersey
5:30 p.m. EDT (UTC-4)	O'Hara (yellow card) 35'; Farrelly (yellow card) 66'; Zerboni (yellow card) 90'	Report		Stadium: Red Bull Arena; Attendance: 3,468; Referee: Anja Voigt

May 21, 2023 8	OL Reign	1–4	NJ/NY Gotham FC	Seattle, Washington
3:00 p.m. PDT (UTC-7)	Latsko (yellow card) 71'; Huitema 77' (Bennett); Fishlock (yellow card) 78'	Report	Nighswonger 10' (Mewis); Williams 12'; T. Smith 38' (Sheehan); Bruninha 73'; Ryan (yellow card) 80'	Stadium: Lumen Field; Attendance: 8,146; Referee: Katja Koroleva

May 28, 2023 9	Washington Spirit	1–1	NJ/NY Gotham FC	Washington, D.C.
5:00 p.m. EDT (UTC-4)	Metayer 69' (Hatch)	Report	Bruninha; Nighswonger (yellow card) 62'; Onumonu (yellow card) 88'	Stadium: Audi Field; Attendance: 11,545; Referee: Karen Callado

June 4, 2023 10	NJ/NY Gotham FC	0–1	San Diego Wave FC	Harrison, New Jersey
5:30 p.m. EDT (UTC-4)		Report	Doniak 46' (Shaw); Colaprico (yellow card) 90+9'	Stadium: Red Bull Arena; Attendance: 15,058; Referee: Eric Tattersall

June 11, 2023 11	Houston Dash	1–1	NJ/NY Gotham FC	Houston, Texas
6:00 p.m. CDT (UTC-5)	Sánchez 36' (Alozie); Laity (yellow card) 65'; Chapman (yellow card) 79'; Jacobs (yellow card) 88'; Dydasco (yellow card) 90+12'	Report	Williams 53' (pen.); O'Hara (yellow card) 85'	Stadium: Shell Energy Stadium; Attendance: 5,827; Referee: Alex Billeter

June 18, 2023 12	Racing Louisville FC	2–0	NJ/NY Gotham FC	Louisville, Kentucky
4:00 p.m. EDT (UTC-4)	DeMelo 23'; Kgatlana 46' (Davis); Pickett (yellow card) 78'	Report	Nighswonger (yellow card) 27'; Long (yellow card) 71'; Williams (yellow card) 89'	Stadium: Lynn Family Stadium; Attendance: 5,103; Referee: Rebecca Pagan

June 25, 2023 13	NJ/NY Gotham FC	2–1	Chicago Red Stars	Harrison, New Jersey
5:30 p.m. EDT (UTC-4)	Williams 46' (Martin); Long 69'; Freeman (yellow card) 86'	Report	Roccaro 55' (Griffith); Bianchi (yellow card) 63'; Milazzo (yellow card) 81'	Stadium: Red Bull Arena; Attendance: 5,601; Referee: Matthew Corrigan
Note: Match was paused for 50 minutes due to lightning in the area at the 53rd minute.

July 2, 2023 14	NJ/NY Gotham FC	0–0	Angel City FC	Harrison, New Jersey
5:30 p.m. EDT (UTC-4)	Nighswonger (yellow card) 35'; Martin (yellow card) 54'	Report	Nabet (yellow card) 44'	Stadium: Red Bull Arena; Attendance: 4,991; Referee: Calin Radosav

July 9, 2023 15	NJ/NY Gotham FC	2–1	Portland Thorns FC	Harrison, New Jersey
5:30 p.m. EDT (UTC-4)	Long 21'; Purce (yellow card) 27'; Stengel 56'	Report	Bixby (yellow card) 6'; Betfort 62' (Klingenberg)	Stadium: Red Bull Arena; Attendance: 3,932; Referee: Greg Dopka

August 19, 2023 16	San Diego Wave FC	2–1	NJ/NY Gotham FC	San Diego, California
7:00 p.m. PDT (UTC-7)	Doniak 17' (Barcenas) (yellow card) 56'; Ali 85' (Shaw)	Report	Stengel 90+12' (Onumonu) (yellow card) 44'	Stadium: Snapdragon Stadium; Attendance: 12,045

August 27, 2023 17	NJ/NY Gotham FC	0–0	Racing Louisville FC	Harrison, New Jersey
5:30 p.m. EDT (UTC-4)	Onumonu (yellow card) 21'; Ryan (yellow card) 41'	Report	DeMelo (yellow card) 53'; Borges (yellow card) 89'	Stadium: Red Bull Arena; Attendance: 4,231

September 2, 2023 18	North Carolina Courage	3–3	NJ/NY Gotham FC	Cary, North Carolina
7:00 p.m. EDT (UTC-4)	Miura 19' (Kerolin); Kerolin 45' (Hopkins) (yellow card) 40'; Hopkins 68' (Kerolin); Lussi (yellow card) 85'	Report	Nighswonger 64'; López 73'; Purce 82' (Williams) (yellow card) 75'	Stadium: WakeMed Soccer Park; Attendance: 6,389

September 16, 2023 19	NJ/NY Gotham FC	2–0	Washington Spirit	Harrison, New Jersey
7:30 p.m. EDT (UTC-4)	Nighswonger (yellow card) 15'; González 65', 70' (Williams) (yellow card) 60'	Report	Rodman (yellow card) 60'	Stadium: Red Bull Arena; Attendance: 6,202

October 1, 2023 20	NJ/NY Gotham FC	0–2	Houston Dash	Harrison, New Jersey
6:30 p.m. EDT (UTC-4)	Purce (yellow card) 49'; Farrelly (yellow card) 54'; Haught (yellow card) 68'	Report	Alozie 45+5', 67'	Stadium: Red Bull Arena; Attendance: 6,001; Referee: Elijio Arreguin

October 7, 2023 21	Portland Thorns FC	1–0	NJ/NY Gotham FC	Portland, Oregon
2:00 p.m. PDT (UTC-4)	Sugita 54'	Report		Stadium: Providence Park; Attendance: 19,599; Referee: Danielle Chesky

October 15, 2023 22	NJ/NY Gotham FC	2–2	Kansas City Current	Harrison, New Jersey
5:00 p.m. EDT (UTC-4)	Purce 6'; Ryan 15'	Report	Spaanstra 26'; Nighswonger 36' (o.g.)	Stadium: Red Bull Arena; Attendance: 9,005; Referee: Alyssa Nichols

==== Regular season standings ====
Pos	Team	Pld	W	D	L	GF	GA	GD	Pts	Qualification
1	San Diego Wave FC (S)	22	11	4	7	31	22	+9	37	NWSL Shield, Playoff semifinals, and CONCACAF W Champions Cup
2	Portland Thorns FC	22	10	5	7	42	32	+10	35	Playoff semifinals and W Champions Cup
3	North Carolina Courage	22	9	6	7	29	22	+7	33	Playoff quarterfinals
4	OL Reign	22	9	5	8	29	24	+5	32	Playoff quarterfinals
5	Angel City FC	22	8	7	7	31	30	+1	31	Playoff quarterfinals
6	NJ/NY Gotham FC (C)	22	8	7	7	25	24	+1	31	Playoff quarterfinals
7	Orlando Pride	22	10	1	11	27	28	−1	31	
8	Washington Spirit	22	7	9	6	26	29	−3	30	
9	Racing Louisville FC	22	6	9	7	25	24	+1	27	
10	Houston Dash	22	6	8	8	16	18	−2	26	
11	Kansas City Current	22	8	2	12	30	36	−6	26	
12	Chicago Red Stars	22	7	3	12	28	50	−22	24	

Source: NWSL
Rules for classification: Tiebreakers
(C) Champions and W Champions Cup; (S) NWSL Shield

==== Results summary ====
Overall								Home						Away					
Pld	W	D	L	GF	GA	GD	Pts	W	D	L	GF	GA	GD	W	D	L	GF	GA	GD
22	8	7	7	25	24	+1	31	4	4	3	9	9	0	4	3	4	16	15	+1

Last updated: October 15, 2023.
Source: NWSLsoccer.com

==== Results by matchday ====
Matchday	1	2	3	4	5	6	7	8	9	10	11	12	13	14	15	16	17	18	19	20	21	22
Stadium	A	H	A	H	A	A	H	A	A	H	A	A	H	H	H	A	H	A	H	H	A	H
Result	W	L	W	W	L	W	D	W	D	L	D	L	W	D	W	L	D	D	W	L	L	D
Position	3	7	5	4	5	4	3	1	1	4	5	6	5	5	3	3	4	5	3	3	4	6

Updated to match(es) played on October 15, 2023. Source: NWSL
A = Away; H = Home; W = Win; D = Draw; L = Loss

=== Playoffs ===
October 22, 2023 First round	North Carolina Courage	0–2	NJ/NY Gotham FC	Cary, North Carolina
7:00 pm EDT		Report	Sheehan 45'; Ryan 90+1'	Stadium: WakeMed Soccer Park; Attendance: 4,612; Referee: Katja Koroleva

November 5, 2023 Semi-finals	Portland Thorns FC	0–1 (a.e.t.)	NJ/NY Gotham FC	Portland, Oregon
4:00 pm PST	Sugita (yellow card) 81'	Report; Box	Martin (yellow card) 40'; Nighswonger (yellow card) 70'; López (yellow card) 90+3'; Krieger (yellow card) 96'; Stengel 107'	Stadium: Providence Park; Attendance: 25,218; Referee: Danielle Chesky

November 11, 2023 Championship	OL Reign	1–2	NJ/NY Gotham FC	San Diego, California
5:00 pm PST	Lavelle 29'	Report; Box	Williams 24'; Gonzalez 45+2'; Haught (red card) 90+7'	Stadium: Snapdragon Stadium; Attendance: 25,011; Referee: Katja Koroleva

== Statistics ==
As of matches played November 11, 2023.

Goalscorers
No.	Pos.	Nat.	Name	NWSL	Cup	Playoffs	Total
10	FW	(United States) USA	Lynn Williams	7	2	1	10
32	MF	(United States) USA	Jenna Nighswonger	3	2	0	5
23	FW	(United States) USA	Margaret Purce	3	1	0	4
29	FW	(United States) USA	Katie Stengel	2	1	1	4
3	DF	(Brazil) BRA	Bruninha	3	0	0	3
6	MF	(United States) USA	Allie Long	2	0	0	2
7	MF	(United States) USA	McCall Zerboni	0	2	0	2
18	MF	(United States) USA	Yazmeen Ryan	0	1	1	2
9	FW	(Spain) ESP	Esther Gonzalez	1	0	1	2
20	FW	(United States) USA	Taylor Smith	1	0	0	1
13	MF	(United States) USA	Meleana Shim	0	1	0	1
17	MF	(United States) USA	Delanie Sheehan	0	0	1	1
Total				22	10	5	37

Clean sheets
No.	Pos.	Nat.	Name	NWSL	Cup	Playoffs	Total
4	GK	(United States) USA	Abby Smith	4	1	0	5
24	GK	(United States) USA	Mandy Haught	2	1	2	5
Total				6	2	2	10

== Awards ==
As of July 3, 2023.

=== NWSL monthly awards ===
Best XI of the Month
Month	Pos.	Nat.	Player	Ref.
March/ April	FW	(United States) USA	Lynn Williams	
May	DF	(Brazil) BRA	Bruninha	
May	MF	(United States) USA	Jenna Nighswonger	
May	GK	(United States) USA	Abby Smith	
May	FW	(United States) USA	Lynn Williams (2)	
June	FW	(United States) USA	Lynn Williams (3)	

=== NWSL weekly awards ===
Player of the Week
Wk.	Pos.	Nat.	Player	Won	Ref.
1	FW	(United States) USA	Lynn Williams	Won	
4	FW	(United States) USA	Lynn Williams (2)	Won	
7	GK	(United States) USA	Abby Smith	Won	
8	FW	(United States) USA	Lynn Williams (3)	Won	
9	DF	(Brazil) BRA	Bruninha	Won	
13	FW	(United States) USA	Lynn Williams	Nom.	
15	GK	(United States) USA	Abby Smith	Nom.	

Save of the Week
Wk.	Pos.	Nat.	Player	Won	Ref.
4	GK	(United States) USA	Abby Smith	Won	
5	GK	(United States) USA	Abby Smith (2)	Won	
6	GK	(United States) USA	Mandy Haught	Nom.	
7	GK	(United States) USA	Abby Smith (3)	Won	
10	DF	(Brazil) BRA	Bruninha	Won	
10	GK	(United States) USA	Abby Smith (4)	Won	
11	GK	(United States) USA	Abby Smith	2nd	
14	GK	(United States) USA	Abby Smith (5)	Won	

== Transactions ==
=== 2023 NWSL Draft ===
Draft picks are not automatically signed to the team roster. The 2023 NWSL Draft was held on January 12, 2023, in Philadelphia, Pennsylvania.

R.	P.	Pos.	Nat.	Player	College	Status	Ref.
1	4	FW/MF	(United States) USA	Jenna Nighswonger	Florida State	Signed.	
4	44	MF	(United States) USA	Iliana Hocking	Arizona	Not signed.	

=== Loans in ===
Date	Pos.	Nat.	Player	Previous club	Fee/notes	Ref.
July 5, 2023	FW	(United States) USA	Katie Stengel	(England) Liverpool	Loaned through September 3, 2023.	

=== Transfers in ===
Date	Pos.	Nat.	Player	Previous club	Fee/notes	Ref.
November 28, 2022	GK	(United States) USA	Abby Smith	(United States) Portland Thorns FC	Signed as a free agent through 2025.	
December 1, 2022	DF	(United States) USA	Kristen Edmonds	(United States) Kansas City Current	Signed as a free agent through 2024.	
December 8, 2022	DF	(United States) USA	Nealy Martin	(United States) Racing Louisville FC	Signed off waivers to a one-year contract with one-year option.	
January 5, 2023	DF	(United States) USA	Yazmeen Ryan	(United States) Portland Thorns FC (via Angel City FC)	Acquired via trade with $250,000 in allocation money in exchange for the first-overall pick in the 2023 NWSL Draft.	
January 12, 2023	FW	(United States) USA	Lynn Williams	(United States) Kansas City Current	Acquired via trade in exchange for the 2nd-overall pick in the 2023 NWSL Draft.	
January 25, 2023	DF	(United States) USA	Kelley O'Hara	(United States) Washington Spirit	Signed as a free agent through 2024.	
March 15, 2023	FW/MF	(United States) USA	Jenna Nighswonger	(United States) Florida State	2023 NWSL Draft selection signed a three-year contract.	
June 25, 2023	MF	(United States) USA	Mana Shim	Retirement; previously (United States) Houston Dash	Signed a short-term injury replacement contract.	
July 6, 2023	MF	(Spain) ESP	Maitane López	(Spain) Atlético Madrid	Free transfer signed a two-year contract with an option for an additional year.	

=== Contract operations ===
Date	Pos.	Nat.	Player	Fee/notes	Ref.
October 14, 2022	MF	(United States) USA	Nicole Baxter	Contracts not renewed.	
October 14, 2022	MF	(Ghana) GHA	Jennifer Cudjoe	Contracts not renewed.	
October 14, 2022	FW	(Japan) JPN	Kumi Yokoyama	Contracts not renewed.	
October 14, 2022	FW	(United States) USA	Jenna Bike	Contracts not renewed.	
October 14, 2022	FW	(United States) USA	Domi Richardson	Contract option not exercised.	
June 20, 2023	FW	(United States) USA	Lynn Williams	Contract renewed through 2025.	

=== Transfers out ===
Date	Pos.	Nat.	Player	Destination team	Fee/notes	Ref.
December 2, 2022	DF	(Cameroon) CMR	Estelle Johnson	(United States) North Carolina Courage	Free agent signing.	
January 12, 2023	FW	(United States) USA	Paige Monaghan	(United States) Racing Louisville FC	Traded with $150,000 in allocation money and a 2023 international slot in exchange for the fourth-overall pick in the 2023 NWSL Draft.	
January 18, 2023	FW	(United States) USA	Cameron Tucker	—	Waived.	
February 2, 2023	DF	(United States) USA	Kelly Ann Livingstone	(Denmark) Fortuna Hjørring	Waived.	
April 25, 2023	GK	(United States) USA	Hensley Hancuff		Waived.	
April 27, 2023	MF	(Canada) CAN	Victoria Pickett	(United States) North Carolina Courage	Traded in exchange for $200,000 in allocation money.	
July 8, 2023	MF	(Japan) JPN	Nahomi Kawasumi		Contract mutually terminated.	

=== Retirements ===
Date	Pos.	Nat.	Player	Notes	Ref.
October 14, 2022	MF	(United States) USA	Nicole Baxter	Retired.	
November 16, 2022	GK	(United States) USA	Ashlyn Harris	Retired; joined Gotham FC's front office.	
