= 2024 NJ/NY Gotham FC season =

NJ/NY Gotham FC's fifteenth season

NJ/NY Gotham FC
2024 season
- Operating owners: Carolyn Tisch Blodgett (lead); Ed Nalbandian
- General manager: Yael Averbuch West
- Head coach: Juan Carlos Amorós
- Stadium: Red Bull Arena; Harrison, New Jersey; (Capacity: 25,000)
- League: 3rd
- Challenge Cup: Runners-up
- NWSL x Liga MX Femenil Summer Cup: Runners-up
- CONCACAF W Champions Cup: Semifinals
- Top goalscorer: League: Esther González (9); All: Esther González (10)
- Highest home attendance: 11,662 (Jun 8 vs LA)
- Lowest home attendance: 5,883 (Sep 8 vs HOU)
- Average home league attendance: 8,589
- Biggest win: League: 5–1 (Oct 5 vs. BAY); All competitions: 0–13 (Oct 13 at Frazsiers Whip, CONCACAF)
- Biggest defeat: 2 goals (3 league matches, 5 all competitions)
Home colors	Away colors
- All statistics correct as of November 16, 2024.

The 2024 NJ/NY Gotham FC season was the team's 15th season as a professional women's soccer team and eleventh participating in the National Women's Soccer League (NWSL), the top tier of women's soccer in the United States.

As reigning champions, Gotham opened the 2024 NWSL season against San Diego Wave FC, the previous season's NWSL Shield winners, in the 2024 NWSL Challenge Cup one day before the beginning of the regular season.

Gotham finished the regular season in third place and advanced to the NWSL playoffs, where they defeated Portland Thorns FC in the quarterfinals before drawing against the Washington Spirit in regulation and losing the penalty shootout after extra time in the semifinals.

== Background ==
=== Notable offseason transactions ===
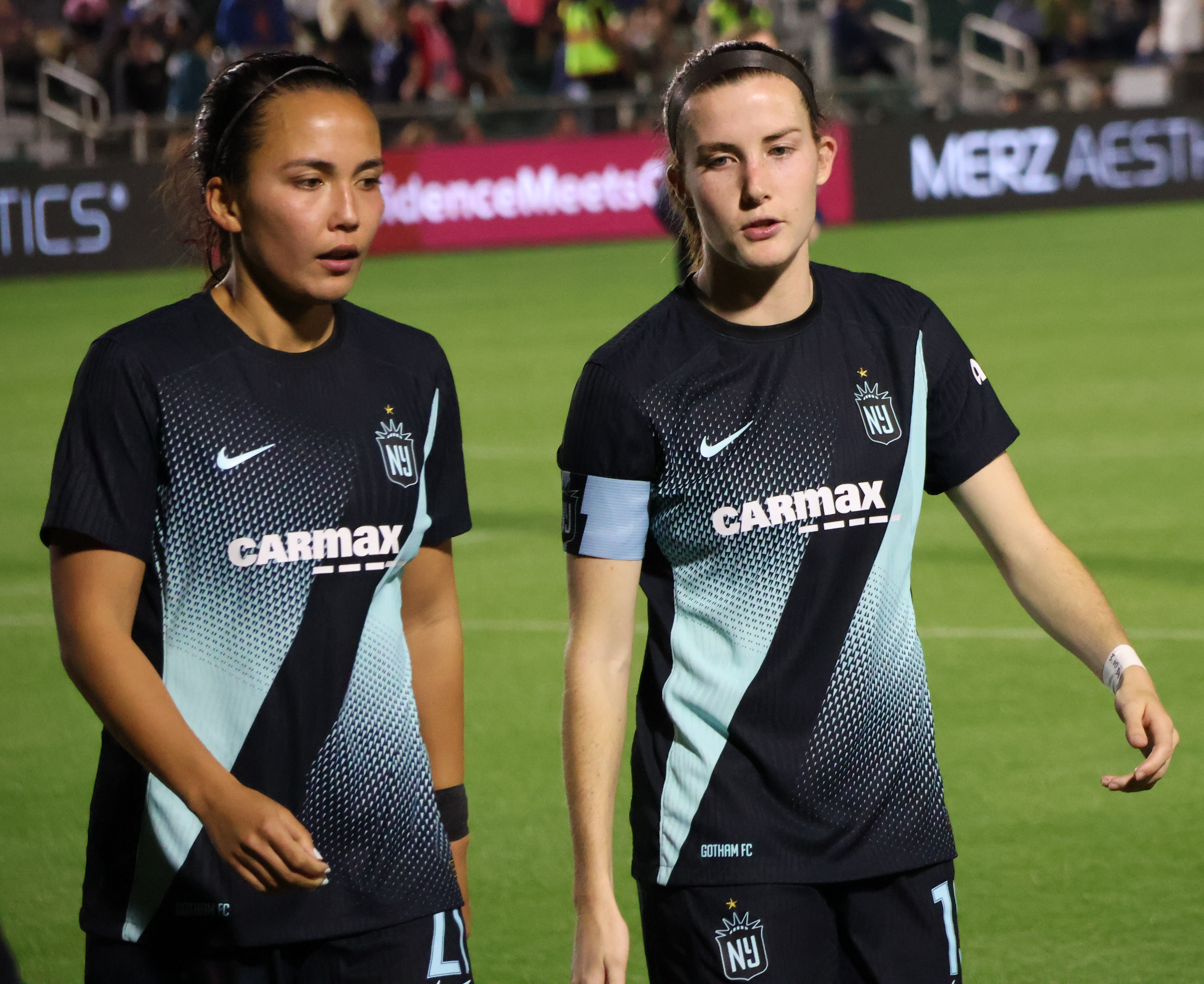
Defenders Sam Hiatt and Tierna Davidson joined Gotham in 2024.

By December 2023, Gotham were in negotiations to sign four members of the United States women's national soccer team: Tierna Davidson, Crystal Dunn, Rose Lavelle, and Emily Sonnett. Dunn and Davidson were signed the next month, followed by Lavelle and Sonnett days later.

== Team ==
=== Staff ===
As of March 7, 2024

Technical staff
Role	Name
General manager Head of soccer operations	Yael Averbuch West
Head coach	Juan Carlos Amorós
Assistant coaches	Jen Lalor
Assistant coaches	Shaun Harris
Assistant coaches	Ak Lakhani
Goalkeeper coach	Brody Sams
Head of tactical analysis	Jesús Botello Hermosa
Head of sports science	Philip Congleton
Strength and conditioning coach	Adrián Benítez Jiménez

=== Current squad ===
As of March 16, 2024.

No.	Pos.	Nation	Player
1	GK	USA	Michelle Betos
3	DF	BRA	Bruninha
4	GK	USA	Abby Smith
5	DF	USA	Kelley O'Hara
6	MF	USA	Emily Sonnett
7	MF	USA	McCall Zerboni
8	DF	USA	Taryn Torres
10	FW	USA	Lynn Williams
11	FW	ESP	Esther González
12	DF	USA	Kristen Edmonds
14	MF	USA	Nealy Martin
15	DF	USA	Tierna Davidson
16	MF	USA	Rose Lavelle
17	MF	USA	Delanie Sheehan
18	MF	USA	Yazmeen Ryan
19	FW	USA	Crystal Dunn
20	FW	USA	Taylor Smith
21	DF	USA	Sam Hiatt
22	DF	USA	Mandy Freeman
23	FW	USA	Margaret Purce
25	DF	USA	Maycee Bell
28	FW	USA	Katie Stengel
2	DF	USA	Jenna Nighswonger
33	MF	IRL	Sinead Farrelly
38	GK	USA	Cassie Miller
77	DF	ESP	Maitane López
13	FW	USA	Ella Stevens
—	FW	ISL	Svava Rós Guðmundsdóttir
—	GK	USA	Erin McKinney

== Competitions ==
=== Friendlies ===
August 19	NJ/NY Gotham FC (United States)	1–3	(England) Chelsea Women	Harrison, New Jersey
7:00 pm ET	Carter 31', (yellow card) 71'; Martin (yellow card) 65'	Report	Kaneryd 7', 15'; Jones 26'; Bright (yellow card) 45+3'	Stadium: Red Bull Arena

=== NWSL Challenge Cup ===
The Challenge Cup was reformatted in 2024 to open the season as a single contest between the prior season's NWSL Shield winner and the reigning NWSL Champion.

March 15	NJ/NY Gotham FC	0–1	San Diego Wave FC	Harrison, New Jersey
8:00 pm ET		Report	Morgan 88'	Stadium: Red Bull Arena; Attendance: 14,241; Referee: Danielle Chesky

=== Regular season ===
March 24 1	Portland Thorns FC	0–1	NJ/NY Gotham FC	Portland, Oregon
7:00 pm ET		Report	González 72'	Stadium: Providence Park; Attendance: 19,857; Referee: Ricardo Fierro

March 30 2	North Carolina Courage	1–0	NJ/NY Gotham FC	Cary, North Carolina
7:00 pm ET	Pinto 44'	Report		Stadium: WakeMed Soccer Park; Attendance: 5,281; Referee: Elton García

April 14 3	NJ/NY Gotham FC	1–1	Kansas City Current	Harrison, New Jersey
6:00 pm ET	González 51'	Report	Chawinga 17'	Stadium: Red Bull Arena; Attendance: 8,573; Referee: Anya Voigt

April 20 4	Washington Spirit	2–0	NJ/NY Gotham FC	Washington, District of Columbia
1:00 pm ET	Bethune 41'; Hatch 69' (pen.)	Report		Stadium: Audi Field; Attendance: 15,004; Referee: Ekaterina Koroleva

April 28 5	NJ/NY Gotham FC	1–1	Racing Louisville FC	Harrison, New Jersey
5:00 pm ET	Lavelle 90+7'	Report	Turner 90+5'	Stadium: Red Bull Arena; Attendance: 6,015; Referee: Calin Radosav

May 4 6	NJ/NY Gotham FC	1–0	North Carolina Courage	Harrison, New Jersey
7:30 pm ET	Williams 11'	Report		Stadium: Red Bull Arena; Attendance: 6,184; Referee: Jeremy Scheer

May 8 7	Houston Dash	0–1	NJ/NY Gotham FC	Houston, Texas
8:00 pm ET		Report	Williams 8'	Stadium: Shell Energy Stadium; Attendance: 4,438; Referee: Laura Rodriguez

May 12 8	San Diego Wave FC	1–1	NJ/NY Gotham FC	San Diego, California
8:00 pm ET	Lundkvist 64'	Report	Stevens 25'	Stadium: Snapdragon Stadium; Attendance: 16,024; Referee: Matthew Thompson

May 19 9	NJ/NY Gotham FC	2–1	Chicago Red Stars	Harrison, New Jersey
5:00 pm ET	Williams 57'; Stevens 90'	Report	Hocking 74'	Stadium: Red Bull Arena; Attendance: 8,996; Referee: Ekaterina Koroleva

May 24 10	Bay FC	0–2	NJ/NY Gotham FC	San Jose, California
10:00 pm ET		Report	Stevens 31', 33'	Stadium: PayPal Park; Attendance: 12,643; Referee: Alyssa Nichols

June 8 11	NJ/NY Gotham FC	2–1	Angel City FC	Harrison, New Jersey
12:30 pm ET	Dunn 26'; Lavelle 62'	Report	Le Bihan 51'	Stadium: Red Bull Arena; Attendance: 11,662; Referee: Rebecca Pagan

June 15 12	Racing Louisville FC	0–2	NJ/NY Gotham FC	Louisville, Kentucky
1:00 pm ET		Report	Ryan 21'; Stevens 53'	Stadium: Lynn Family Stadium; Attendance: 6,412; Referee: Danielle Chesky

June 19 13	NJ/NY Gotham FC	2–1	San Diego Wave FC	Harrison, New Jersey
7:00 pm ET	Lavelle 45+3'; Bell 90+8'	Report	Jones 48'	Stadium: Red Bull Arena; Attendance: 10,718; Referee: Anya Voigt

June 23 14	NJ/NY Gotham FC	0–2	Washington Spirit	Harrison, New Jersey
12:30 pm ET	Ryan (red card) 45+9'	Report	Brown 27'; Rodman 47'	Stadium: Red Bull Arena; Attendance: 8,396; Referee: Jeremy Scheer

June 30 15	NJ/NY Gotham FC	1–1	Seattle Reign FC	Harrison, New Jersey
1:00 pm ET	Lavelle 47'	Report	Brown 90+9' (o.g.)	Stadium: Red Bull Arena; Attendance: 7,064; Referee: Elvis Osmanovic

July 6 16	Angel City FC	1–2	NJ/NY Gotham FC	Los Angeles, California
10:00 pm ET	Emslie 69' (pen.)	Report	Lavelle 16'; Sheehan 40'	Stadium: BMO Stadium; Attendance: 16,542; Referee: Ekaterina Koroleva

August 24 17	NJ/NY Gotham FC	2–0	Portland Thorns FC	Harrison, New Jersey
2:00 pm ET	Stevens 7'; Ryan 70'	Report		Stadium: Red Bull Arena; Attendance: 10,640; Referee: Darren Bandy

September 1 18	Orlando Pride	2–0	NJ/NY Gotham FC	Orlando, Florida
6:00 pm ET	Adriana 6', 19'	Report		Stadium: Inter&Co Stadium; Attendance: 8,726; Referee: Thomas Snyder

September 8 19	NJ/NY Gotham FC	2–1	Houston Dash	Harrison, New Jersey
1:00 pm ET	Ryan 10'; Sheehan (yellow card) 32'; Silva (yellow card) 79'; González 90+3'	Report	Ordóñez 16'; Tarciane (yellow card) 32'	Stadium: Red Bull Arena; Attendance: 5,883; Referee: Joshua Encarnación

September 16 20	Seattle Reign FC	0–2	NJ/NY Gotham FC	Seattle, Washington
10:00 pm ET	King (yellow card) 59'	Report	Sheehan 41'; Martin (yellow card) 73'; Esther 85'	Stadium: Lumen Field; Referee: Shawn Tehini

September 22 21	NJ/NY Gotham FC	1–0	Utah Royals	Harrison, New Jersey
1:00 pm ET	Ryan 3'	Report	Lacasse (yellow card) 43'; Betfort (yellow card) 87'	Stadium: Red Bull Arena; Attendance: 7,680; Referee: Eric Tattersall

September 28 22	Kansas City Current	1–1	NJ/NY Gotham FC	Kansas City, Missouri
1:00 pm ET	Chawinga 51', (yellow card) 80'	Report	Cook 15' (o.g.); Martin (yellow card) 14'	Stadium: CPKC Stadium; Attendance: 11,500; Referee: Katja Koroleva

October 5 23	NJ/NY Gotham FC	5–1	Bay FC	Harrison, New Jersey
7:30 pm ET	Nighswonger 9' (pen.); Lavelle 69'; González 71', 73'; Kizer 83'	Report	Oshoala 17'	Stadium: Red Bull Arena; Attendance: 9,092; Referee: Sergii Demianchuk

October 12 24	Chicago Red Stars	0–2	NJ/NY Gotham FC	Bridgeview, Illinois
4:00 pm ET	Groom (yellow card) 29'	Report	L. Williams 87' (pen.); Sonnett (yellow card) 80'; Esther 90+8'	Stadium: SeatGeek Stadium; Referee: Greg Dopka

October 20 25	NJ/NY Gotham FC	3–1	Orlando Pride	Harrison, New Jersey
5:00 pm ET	Hiatt 13'; Lavelle 45+1'; Stevens 49'; Nighswonger (yellow card) 54'; Martin (yellow card) 88'	Report	Adriana 31' (pen.)	Stadium: Red Bull Arena; Attendance: 10,757; Referee: Ricardo Fierro

November 1 26	Utah Royals	1–4	NJ/NY Gotham FC	Sandy, Utah
9:30 pm ET	Betfort 73'	Report	Ryan 14'; Freeman 16'; Stevens (yellow card) 21'; Esther 76', 83'; Nighswonger (yellow card) 86'; Carter (yellow card) 90+6'	Stadium: America First Field; Attendance: 9,879; Referee: Adorae Monroy

==== Regular season standings ====
Pos	Team	Pld	W	D	L	GF	GA	GD	Pts	Qualification
1	Orlando Pride (C, S)	26	18	6	2	46	20	+26	60	NWSL Shield, playoffs, and CONCACAF W Champions Cup
2	Washington Spirit	26	18	2	6	51	28	+23	56	Playoffs, and CONCACAF W Champions Cup
3	NJ/NY Gotham FC	26	17	5	4	41	20	+21	56	Playoffs, and CONCACAF W Champions Cup (Note: With Orlando Pride winning both the 2024 National Women's Soccer League Championship and 2024 National Women's Soccer League Shield, the third qualifying spot for the United States went to the next best club in 2024 National Women's Soccer League Shield standings not already qualified, Gotham FC.)
4	Kansas City Current	26	16	7	3	57	31	+26	55	Playoffs
5	North Carolina Courage	26	12	3	11	34	28	+6	39	Playoffs

Source: NWSL
Rules for classification: Tiebreakers
(C) Champions and W Champions Cup; (S) NWSL Shield

==== Results summary ====
Overall								Home						Away					
Pld	W	D	L	GF	GA	GD	Pts	W	D	L	GF	GA	GD	W	D	L	GF	GA	GD
26	17	5	4	41	20	+21	56	9	3	1	23	11	+12	8	2	3	18	9	+9

Last updated: November 1, 2024.
Source: NWSLsoccer.com

==== Results by matchday ====
Matchday	1	2	3	4	5	6	7	8	9	10	11	12	13	14	15	16	17	18	19	20	21	22	23	24	25	26
Stadium	A	A	H	A	H	H	A	A	H	A	H	A	H	H	H	A	H	A	H	A	H	A	H	A	H	A
Result	W	L	D	L	D	W	W	D	W	W	W	W	W	L	D	W	W	L	W	W	W	D	W	W	W	W
Position	8	4	7	7	11	11	9	7	7	5	5	4	4	4	4	4	4	4	4	4	3	3	3	3	3	3

Updated to match(es) played on November 2, 2024. Source: NWSL
A = Away; H = Home; W = Win; D = Draw; L = Loss

=== Playoffs ===
November 10, 2024 Quarterfinals	NJ/NY Gotham FC	2–1	Portland Thorns FC	Harrison, New Jersey
3:00 PM EST	Davidson 67'; Carter (yellow card) 74'; Lavelle 90+7'	Report	Turner 75'	Stadium: Red Bull Arena; Attendance: 15,540; Referee: Danielle Chesky
Note: Set all-time club attendance record for a home match in all competitions.

November 16, 2024 Semifinals	Washington Spirit	1–1 (a.e.t.) (3–0 p)	NJ/NY Gotham FC	Washington, District of Columbia
12:00 p.m. EST (UTC−5)	Hershfelt 90+3'; Krueger (yellow card) 97'; Rodman (yellow card) 102'	Report	Carter (yellow card) 17'; Sheehan (yellow card) 23'; González 56'; Bruninha (yellow card) 72' (yellow-red card) 101'; Nighswonger (yellow card) 90+2'; Zerboni (yellow card) 116'	Stadium: Audi Field; Attendance: 19,365; Referee: Matthew Thompson
	Penalties
	Hatch (penalty scored); Silano (penalty scored); McKeown (penalty scored)		(penalty missed) González; (penalty missed) Zerboni; (penalty missed) Nighswonger

=== NWSL x Liga MX Femenil Summer Cup ===
Pos	Team	Pld	W	PW	PL	L	GF	GA	GD	Pts	Qualification	NYJ	CHI	WAS	GUA
1	(United States Soccer Federation) NJ/NY Gotham FC	3	2	1	0	0	4	0	+4	8	Advances to knockout stage	—	0–0	1–0	3–0
2	(United States Soccer Federation) Chicago Red Stars	3	1	0	1	1	3	3	0	4		0–0	—	3–2	0–1
3	(United States Soccer Federation) Washington Spirit	3	1	0	0	2	4	5	−1	3		0–1	2–3	—	2–1
4	(Mexican Football Federation) Guadalajara	3	1	0	0	2	2	5	−3	3		0–3	1–0	1–2	—

Source: NWSL
Rules for classification: tiebreakers

July 20, 2024 1	Chicago Red Stars (United States)	0–0 (4–5 p)	(United States) NJ/NY Gotham FC	Bridgeview, Illinois
5:00 p.m. CDT (UTC-7)		Report		Stadium: SeatGeek Stadium; Referee: Salvador Flores
	Penalties
	Schlegel (penalty scored); Anderson (penalty scored); Bike (penalty scored); Groom (penalty missed); Bianchi (penalty scored)		(penalty scored) Ryan; (penalty scored) Stevens; (penalty scored) Sheehan; (penalty scored) Stengel; (penalty scored) Edmonds

July 28, 2024 2	NJ/NY Gotham FC (United States)	1–0	(United States) Washington Spirit	Chester, Pennsylvania
5:00 p.m. EDT (UTC-7)	Ryan 62' (pen.)	Report		Stadium: Subaru Park; Referee: Sergii Demianchuk

August 2, 2024 3	NJ/NY Gotham FC (United States)	3–0	(Mexico) C.D. Guadalajara	Harrison, New Jersey
8:00 p.m. EDT (UTC-7)		Report		Stadium: Red Bull Arena

August 6, 2024 SF	NJ/NY Gotham FC (United States)	1–0	(United States) Angel City FC	Kansas City, Missouri
5:00 p.m. EDT (UTC-7)	Sheehan 48'	Report		Stadium: CPKC Stadium; Referee: Elijio Arreguin

October 25, 2024 F	NJ/NY Gotham FC (United States)	0–2	(United States) Kansas City Current	San Antonio, Texas
5:00 p.m. EDT (UTC-7)		Report		Stadium: Toyota Field

=== 2024–25 CONCACAF W Champions Cup ===
Pos	Team	Pld	W	D	L	GF	GA	GD	Pts	Qualification	TUA	NYJ	MON	LDA	FRA
1	(Mexico) Tigres UANL	4	3	1	0	18	6	+12	10	Advance to knockout stage	—	—	4–0	3–1	—
2	(United States) NJ/NY Gotham	4	2	2	0	21	4	+17	8	Advance to knockout stage	4–4	—	0–0	—	—
3	(Mexico) Monterrey	4	2	1	1	8	4	+4	7		—	—	—	3–0	5–0
4	(Costa Rica) Alajuelense	4	1	0	3	6	10	−4	3		—	0–4	—	—	5–0
5	(Jamaica) Frazsiers Whip	4	0	0	4	1	30	−29	0		1–7	0–13	—	—	—

Source: CONCACAF
Rules for classification: Tiebreakers

NJ/NY Gotham FC qualified as the 2023 National Women's Soccer League champions.

==== Group stage ====
September 5, 2024 1	Alajuelense (Costa Rica)	0–4	(United States) NJ/NY Gotham FC	Alajuela, Costa Rica
8:00 p.m. EDT (UTC-4)		Report	Gonzalez 3'; Stengel 31' (pen.); Nighswonger 45+1'; Sheehan 54'	Stadium: Estadio Alejandro Morera Soto; Referee: Merlin Soto (Honduras)

September 19, 2024 2	NJ/NY Gotham (United States)	0–0	(Mexico) C.F. Monterrey Feminil	Harrison, United States
7:00 p.m. EDT (UTC-4)		Report		Stadium: Red Bull Arena

October 2, 2024 3	Frazsiers Whip (Jamaica)	0–13	(United States) NJ/NY Gotham FC	Kingston, Jamaica
8:00 p.m. EDT (UTC-4)		Report	Ryan 13', 18', 90+2'; Freeman 39'; Kizer 45+5'; Nighswonger 47'; Torres 52', 53'; Williams 82', 86', 90+3'; Silva 84'; Able 85' (o.g.)	Stadium: National Stadium; Referee: Amairany Garcìa (Mexico)

October 16, 2024 4	NJ/NY Gotham (United States)	4–4	(Mexico) Tigres Femenil	Harrison, United States
8:00 p.m. EDT (UTC-4)	Zerboni 4'; González 21'; Sheehan 42'; López 71'	Report	Mayor 6'; Dias 15', 25'; Ovalle 60' (pen.)	Stadium: Red Bull Arena; Referee: Astrid Gramajo (Guatemala)

==== Semifinals ====
May 22, 2025	América (Mexico)	–	(United States) NJ/NY Gotham
--:--

== Transactions ==
=== 2024 NWSL Draft ===
Draft picks are not automatically signed to the team roster.

Round	Pick	Pos.	Nat.	Player	College	Status	Ref.
1	14	DF	(United States) USA	Maycee Bell	North Carolina Tar Heels	Signed.	

=== Transfers in ===
Date	Pos.	Nat.	Player	Previous club	Fee/notes	Ref.
January 2, 2024	DF	(United States) USA	Tierna Davidson	(United States) Chicago Red Stars		
January 2, 2024	MF	(United States) USA	Crystal Dunn	(United States) Portland Thorns FC		
January 4, 2024	DF	(United States) USA	Rose Lavelle	(United States) OL Reign	Free agent	
January 4, 2024	DF	(United States) USA	Emily Sonnett	(United States) OL Reign	Free agent	
January 23, 2024	GK	(United States) USA	Cassie Miller	(United States) Kansas City Current	Trade	
January 24, 2024	DF	(United States) USA	Sam Hiatt	(United States) OL Reign	Trade	

==== Loans out ====
Start date	End date	Pos.	Nat.	Player	Destination club	Ref.
January 31, 2024		DF	(United States) USA	Taylor Smith	(England) Brighton & Hove Albion W.F.C.	
