= 2021 NJ/NY Gotham FC season =

NJ/NY Gotham FC
2021 season
- Club Chair: Tammy Murphy
- Head coach: Freya Coombe (until August 29); Scott Parkinson (from August 31)
- Stadium: Red Bull Arena; Harrison, New Jersey (Capacity: 25,000)
- NWSL: 5th
- Playoffs: Quarter-finals
- Challenge Cup: Runners-up
- Top goalscorer: League: Margaret Purce (9); All: Margaret Purce (11)
Home colors	Away colors

The 2021 NJ/NY Gotham FC season was the team's 12th season as a professional women's soccer team and their ninth season as a member of the National Women's Soccer League, the top division of women's soccer in the United States. It is the first season following the club's change of name from Sky Blue FC, which it played under from 2007 to 2020.

On May 2, Gotham qualified for the final of the NWSL Challenge Cup, marking the club's first appearance in a final since the 2009 Women's Professional Soccer playoffs. However, following a 1–1 draw with the Portland Thorns, Gotham were defeated 6–5 on penalties in the final.

On August 22, it was announced that head coach Freya Coombe would be taking over Angel City FC for the 2022 National Women's Soccer League season. Although initially slated to remain in her post for the remainder of the season, following concerns about possible conflicts of interest Coombe stepped down on August 29, with her final match in charge being a 1–0 defeat to the Orlando Pride on that day. Scott Parkinson was subsequently announced as Coombe's successor on August 31. On October 30, Gotham qualified for the NWSL playoffs for the first time since 2013, but were subsequently eliminated in the first round by the Chicago Red Stars.

== Team ==
=== First-team roster ===
As of July 22, 2021

No.	Name	Nationality	Position(s)	Date of birth (age)	Signed from	Notes (Note: denotes a season-ending injury.)
Goalkeepers
1	Kailen Sheridan	(Canada)	GK	July 16, 1995 (age 31)	(United States) Clemson Tigers	
13	DiDi Haracic	(Bosnia and Herzegovina)	GK	April 12, 1992 (age 34)	(United States) Washington Spirit	
21	Mandy McGlynn	(United States)	GK	November 3, 1998 (age 27)	(United States) Virginia Cavaliers	
35	Megan Hinz	(United States)	GK	December 4, 1995 (age 30)	(United States) Chicago Red Stars	
Defenders
3	Caprice Dydasco	(United States)	RB/LB	August 19, 1993 (age 33)	(United States) Washington Spirit	
8	Erica Skroski	(United States)	CB/LB	February 14, 1994 (age 32)	(United States) Rutgers Scarlet Knights	
12	Gina Lewandowski	(United States)	CB	April 13, 1985 (age 41)	(Germany) Bayern Munich	
15	Sabrina Flores	(Mexico)	RB/LB	January 31, 1996 (age 30)	(Spain) Sevilla	
22	Mandy Freeman	(United States)	CB	March 23, 1995 (age 31)	(United States) USC Trojans	
24	Estelle Johnson	(Cameroon)	CB	July 21, 1988 (age 38)	(United States) Washington Spirit	
28	Imani Dorsey	(United States)	LB/LW	March 21, 1996 (age 30)	(United States) Duke Blue Devils	
Midfielders
2	Brianna Pinto	(United States)	CM	May 24, 2000 (age 26)	(United States) University of North Carolina	
5	Nicole Baxter	(United States)	DM/CM/AM	May 24, 1994 (age 32)	(Sweden) Asarums IF	
6	Jennifer Cudjoe	(Ghana)	CM/AM	March 7, 1994 (age 32)	(United States) Racing Louisville	
7	McCall Zerboni (captain)	(United States)	CM/AM	December 13, 1986 (age 39)	(United States) North Carolina Courage	
9	Nahomi Kawasumi	(Japan)	LW/AM/FW	September 23, 1985 (age 40)	(United States) OL Reign	
11	Lee So-dam	(South Korea)	CM	October 12, 1994 (age 31)	(South Korea) Hyundai Steel Red Angels	
14	Kenie Wright	(United States)	DM/CB/RB/LB	August 14, 1997 (age 29)	(United States) Rutgers Scarlet Knights	
16	Allie Long	(United States)	CM	August 13, 1987 (age 39)	(United States) OL Reign	
17	Domi Richardson	(United States)	DM/CM/CB	October 18, 1992 (age 33)	Free agent	
18	Delanie Sheehan	(United States)	CM/RB	January 13, 1999 (age 27)	(United States) UCLA	
19	Elizabeth Eddy	(United States)	CM/AM/RW/LB	September 13, 1991 (age 35)	(United States) North Carolina Courage	
27	Gaëtane Thiney	(France)	AM/FW	October 28, 1985 (age 40)	(France) Paris FC	Loan in
Forwards
4	Paige Monaghan	(United States)	RW/FW	November 13, 1996 (age 29)	(United States) Butler Bulldogs	
10	Carli Lloyd	(United States)	FW/DM/CM/AM	July 16, 1982 (age 44)	(United States) Houston Dash	
20	Évelyne Viens	(Canada)	FW	February 6, 1997 (age 29)	(United States) South Florida Bulls	
23	Margaret Purce	(United States)	RW/LW/FW/RB	September 18, 1995 (age 31)	(United States) Portland Thorns FC	
25	Ifeoma Onumonu	(Nigeria)	FW	February 25, 1994 (age 32)	(United States) OL Reign	

=== Coaching staff ===
As of August 31, 2021

Position	Staff
Head Coach	(England) Scott Parkinson
Assistant Coach	(United States) Beverly Goebel Yanez
Assistant Coach	(England) Becki Tweed
Goalkeeper Coach	(England) Daniel Ball
High Performance Coach	(United States) Philip Congleton
Technical Advisor	(United States) Marcia McDermott
Head Physio	(United States) Joelle Muro
Head Athletic Trainer	(United States) Sara Carpentieri

== Competitions ==
=== Overview ===
Competition	First match	Last match	Final position	Record							
Competition	First match	Last match	Final position	Pld	W	D	L	GF	GA	GD	Win %
National Women's Soccer League	May 15, 2021	October 31, 2021	5th	24	8	11	5	29	21	+8	33.33
NWSL Challenge Cup	April 14, 2021	May 8, 2021	Runners-up	5	2	3	0	6	4	+2	40.00
NWSL Playoffs	November 7, 2021		Quarter-finals	1	0	0	1	0	1	−1	0.00
Total				30	10	14	6	35	26	+9	33.33

Last updated: November 7, 2021
Source: Competitions

=== Preseason ===
Preseason training camp began on February 1, 2021. On the same day, Gotham FC announced a 28-player preseason roster, including four non-roster invitees. The club's first preseason friendly was announced on March 3, to be played behind closed doors. Another friendly, against fellow NWSL club Washington Spirit, was announced on March 7.

==== Matches ====
March 7, 2021	Gotham FC	6–0	James Madison Dukes	Hanover Township, New Jersey
14:30 EST	Kawasumi 21'; Eddy 25'; Lloyd 46', 88'; Monaghan 68'; Purce 70'	Report		Stadium: Red Bulls Training Facility; Attendance: 0

March 20, 2021	Gotham FC	4–0	Virginia Cavaliers	Hanover Township, New Jersey
12:00 EDT	Onumonu 13'; Freeman 24'; Baxter 59'; Eddy 83'	Report		Stadium: Red Bulls Training Facility; Attendance: 0

March 28, 2021	Washington Spirit	1–2	Gotham FC	Washington, D.C.
	Nielsen (yellow card) 27'; Sanchez 37'	Report	Zerboni (yellow card) 5' (yellow-red card) 73'; Monaghan 6'; Freeman (yellow card) 37'; Lee 60', (yellow card) 90'	Stadium: Audi Field

=== National Women's Soccer League ===
==== Regular season ====
===== Standings =====
Pos	Team	Pld	W	D	L	GF	GA	GD	Pts	Qualification
1	Portland Thorns FC	24	13	5	6	33	17	+16	44	NWSL Shield
2	OL Reign	24	13	3	8	37	24	+13	42	Playoffs – Semi-finals
3	Washington Spirit (C)	24	11	6	7	29	26	+3	39	Playoffs – First round
4	Chicago Red Stars	24	11	5	8	28	28	0	38	Playoffs – First round
5	NJ/NY Gotham FC	24	8	11	5	29	21	+8	35	Playoffs – First round
6	North Carolina Courage	24	9	6	9	28	23	+5	33	Playoffs – First round
7	Houston Dash	24	9	5	10	31	31	0	32	
8	Orlando Pride	24	7	7	10	27	32	−5	28	
9	Racing Louisville FC	24	5	7	12	21	40	−19	22	
10	Kansas City	24	3	7	14	15	36	−21	16	

Source: NWSL
Rules for classification: Tiebreakers
(C) Champions

===== Results summary =====
Overall								Home						Away					
Pld	W	D	L	GF	GA	GD	Pts	W	D	L	GF	GA	GD	W	D	L	GF	GA	GD
24	8	11	5	29	21	+8	35	4	5	3	10	8	+2	4	6	2	19	13	+6

Last updated: October 31, 2021.
Source: NWSLsoccer.com

===== Results by matchday =====
Round	1	2	3	4	5	6	7	8	9	10	11	12	13	14	15	16	17	18	19	20	21	22	23	24
Stadium	H	A	H	H	A	A	H	A	A	H	A	H	H	A	A	H	H	H	H	A	A	A	A	H
Result	W	D	L	W	D	W	D	D	W	W	D	L	D	L	L	L	D	W	D	W	W	D	D	D
Position	1	3	5	3	4	5	5	6	4	2	2	3	3	4	5	7	7	6	7	5	5	5	5	5

Updated to match(es) played on October 31, 2021. Source: NWSLsoccer.com
A = Away; H = Home; W = Win; D = Draw; L = Loss

===== Matches =====
The regular season schedule was announced on April 27, 2021.

May 15, 2021 1	Gotham FC	1–0	Houston Dash	Harrison, New Jersey
	Cudjoe (yellow card) 8'; Purce 30'; Monaghan (yellow card) 73'	Report	Hanson (yellow card) 66'; Prince (yellow card) 68'; Daly (yellow card) 81'; Schmidt (yellow card) 90+1'	Stadium: Red Bull Arena

May 22, 2021 2	Chicago Red Stars	0–0	Gotham FC	Bridgeview, Illinois
20:00 EDT	Sharples (yellow card) 70'; Colaprico (yellow card) 86'	Report	Viens (yellow card) 43'; Purce (yellow card) 74'	Stadium: SeatGeek Stadium; Attendance: 3,121

May 30, 2021 3	Gotham FC	0–1	Portland Thorns	Harrison, New Jersey
	Dydasco (yellow card) 19'; Long (yellow card) 83'	Report	Dunn 56'; Klingenberg (yellow card) 69'; Rodriguez (yellow card) 75'	Stadium: Red Bull Arena

June 5, 2021 4	Gotham FC	1–0	OL Reign	Harrison, New Jersey
	Onumonu 13'	Report	Angelina (yellow card) 67'	Stadium: Red Bull Arena; Attendance: 2,601

June 20, 2021 5	Orlando Pride	1–1	Gotham FC	Orlando, Florida
	McClernon (yellow card) 26'; Petersen 90'	Report	Cudjoe (yellow card) 35'; Dydasco 45'	Stadium: Exploria Stadium

June 26, 2021 6	OL Reign	0–3	Gotham FC	Tacoma, Washington
	Cruz (yellow card) 47'	Report	Onumonu 38'; Purce 60'; Richardson 85'	Stadium: Cheney Stadium; Attendance: 3,007

July 2, 2021 7	Gotham FC	1–1	Kansas City NWSL	Harrison, New Jersey
	Onumonu 31'; Long (yellow card) 46'	Report	Larroquette 83'	Stadium: Red Bull Arena

July 11, 2021 8	Portland Thorns	0–0	Gotham FC	Portland, Oregon
		Report	Lewandowski (yellow card) 10'; Purce (yellow card) 29'; Kawasumi (yellow card) 33'; Dorsey (yellow card) 90+2'	Stadium: Providence Park; Attendance: 14,731

July 18, 2021 9	Washington Spirit	2–3	Gotham FC	Leesburg, Virginia
17:00 EDT	Staab (red card) 7'; Rodman 13'; Sanchez 56'	Report	Kawasumi 24'; Zerboni 35'; Long (yellow card) 51'; Purce 76', (yellow card) 90+2'	Stadium: Segra Field

July 25, 2021 10	Gotham FC	2–1	Chicago Red Stars	Harrison, New Jersey
	Dorsey (yellow card) 10'; Long 48'; Onumonu (yellow card) 67'; Purce 70'	Report	Watt (yellow card) 49'; St-Georges (red card) 90+4'; Doniak 90+6'	Stadium: Red Bull Arena

August 1, 2021 11	Houston Dash	1–1	Gotham FC	Houston, Texas
	Seiler 51'; Groom (yellow card) 90+6'	Report	Onumonu (yellow card) 27', (goal) 89'	Stadium: BBVA Stadium; Attendance: 3,517

August 7, 2021 12	Gotham FC	0–1	North Carolina Courage	Harrison, New Jersey
	Zerboni (yellow card) 58'	Report	Speck 38'	Stadium: Red Bull Arena; Attendance: 2,179

August 15, 2021 13	Gotham FC	1–1	Racing Louisville	Harrison, New Jersey
	Onumonu 83'	Report	Nadim 13'; Bonner (yellow card) 67'; Riehl (yellow card) 90+6'	Stadium: Red Bull Arena; Attendance: 2,200

August 21, 2021 14	OL Reign	3–2	Gotham FC	Tacoma Washington
	McNabb 57'; Rapinoe 77', 90+1'	Report	Onumonu 9', 15'; Lee (yellow card) 32'; Long (yellow card) 79'	Stadium: Cheney Stadium; Attendance: 3,657

August 25, 2021 15	Portland Thorns	2–1	Gotham FC	Portland, Oregon
	Smith 29'; Sinclair 41'; Horan (yellow card) 52'	Report	Skroski (yellow card) 40'; Lloyd 78'	Stadium: Providence Park

August 29, 2021 16	Gotham FC	0–1	Orlando Pride	Harrison, New Jersey
	Dydasco (yellow card) 54'; Johnson (yellow card) 83'	Report	Tymrak 49'; Viggiano (yellow card) 90+3'	Stadium: Red Bull Arena; Attendance: 7,035

September 4, 2021 17	Gotham FC	0–0	Chicago Red Stars	Harrison, New Jersey
	Lloyd (yellow card) 27'; Dorsey (yellow card) 66'	Report	Gautrat (yellow card) 29'; DiBernardo (yellow card) 86'	Stadium: Red Bull Arena

September 25, 2021 18	Gotham FC	3–1	North Carolina Courage	Harrison, New Jersey
	Onumonu (yellow card) 15'; Lloyd (yellow card) 18', (goal) 28'; Purce 36'; Monaghan (yellow card) 77', (goal) 82'; Sheridan (yellow card) 85'	Report	James 20', (yellow card) 63'; Caldwell (yellow card) 40'	Stadium: Red Bull Arena; Attendance: 2,887

October 6, 2021 19	Gotham FC	0–0	Washington Spirit	Chester, Pennsylvania
	Long (yellow card) 79'	Report	Sullivan (yellow card) 77'	Stadium: Subaru Park; Attendance: 9,532

October 9, 2021 20	Orlando Pride	2–3	Gotham FC	Orlando, Florida
	Dougherty Howard (yellow card) 65'; Tymrak 84'; Marta 89'	Report	Thiney 3', 47'; Purce 50'; Lee (yellow card) 81'	Stadium: Exploria Stadium

October 17, 2021 21	North Carolina Courage	0–3	Gotham FC	Cary, North Carolina
	Mathias (yellow card) 45+2'	Report	Purce 54', 64'; Lloyd 67'; Thiney (yellow card) 83'	Stadium: WakeMed Soccer Park

October 22, 2021 22	Kansas City NWSL	1–1	Gotham FC	Kansas City, Kansas
	Edmonds 45'; McCain (yellow card) 53'	Report	Dydasco (yellow card) 22'; Purce 25'; Long (yellow card) 55'	Stadium: Field of Legends

October 28, 2021 23	Racing Louisville	1–1	Gotham FC	Louisville, Kentucky
	Ashley (yellow card) 31'; Kizer 52'	Report	Onumonu 7'; Lloyd (yellow card) 90'	Stadium: Lynn Family Stadium

October 31, 2021 24	Gotham FC	1–1	Racing Louisville	Harrison, New Jersey
	Purce (yellow card) 45+4'; Lloyd 53'; Freeman (yellow card) 72'	Report	Salmon (yellow card) 54'; Kizer 69'; Nagasoto (yellow card) 81'	Stadium: Red Bull Arena; Attendance: 6,362

==== Playoffs ====
===== Matches =====
November 7, 2021 Quarterfinals	Chicago Red Stars	1–0	Gotham FC	Bridgeview, Illinois
15:00 ET	Woldmoe (yellow card) 51'; Pugh 61'; DiBernardo (yellow card) 80'	Report	Freeman (yellow card) 67'; Lloyd (yellow card) 72'; Johnson (yellow card) 90'	Stadium: SeatGeek Stadium; Attendance: 7,027

=== Challenge Cup ===
The schedule for the 2021 NWSL Challenge Cup was announced on March 9, 2021. Under the rules of the competition, Gotham played four matches as part of the East Division. On April 5, the club announced a twenty-four player roster for the tournament.

==== Standings ====
Pos	Team	Pld	W	D	L	GF	GA	GD	Pts	Qualification
1	NJ/NY Gotham FC	4	2	2	0	5	3	+2	8	Qualification for the Championship
2	North Carolina Courage	4	2	1	1	9	8	+1	7	
3	Orlando Pride	4	1	2	1	3	3	0	5	
4	Washington Spirit	4	1	1	2	3	4	−1	4	
5	Racing Louisville FC	4	0	2	2	4	6	−2	2	

Source: NWSL
Rules for classification: Tiebreakers

==== Matches ====
April 14, 2021	Orlando Pride	0–1	Gotham FC	Orlando, Florida
19:00 EST	Plummer (yellow card) 82'	Report	Skroski (yellow card) 24'; Dydasco (yellow card) 52'; Monaghan 79'	Stadium: Exploria Stadium

April 20, 2021	Gotham FC	4–3	North Carolina Courage	Montclair, New Jersey
18:00 EST	Purce 18', 26'; Lloyd 32'; Cudjoe (yellow card) 86'; Viens 90+2'	Report	Debinha 22', 24'; McDonald 50'	Stadium: MSU Soccer Park at Pittser Field

April 27, 2021	Washington Spirit	0–0	Gotham FC	Washington, D.C.
16:00 EST	Heilferty (yellow card) 88'	Report		Stadium: Audi Field; Attendance: 2,039

May 2, 2021	Gotham FC	0–0	Racing Louisville FC	Montclair, New Jersey
	Cudjoe (yellow card) 28'	Report		Stadium: MSU Soccer Park at Pittser Field

==== Championship ====
As a result of their performances in the East Division of the 2021 NWSL Challenge Cup, in which Gotham FC went unbeaten, the club qualified for the championship match on May 2, 2021. However, because West Division champions Portland Thorns FC had a better overall record in the cup, Portland were selected as the home team for the final.

May 8, 2021	Portland Thorns FC	1–1 (6–5 p)	Gotham FC	Portland, Oregon
	Sinclair 8'; Charley (yellow card) 79'	Report	Lewandowski (yellow card) 38'; Lloyd 61'	Stadium: Providence Park
	Penalties
	Sinclair (penalty scored); Klingenberg (penalty missed); Horan (penalty scored); Rodriguez (penalty scored); Dunn (penalty scored); Sauerbrunn (penalty scored); Weaver (penalty scored)		Long (penalty scored); Lloyd (penalty scored); Cudjoe (penalty missed); Freeman (penalty scored); Onumonu (penalty scored); Viens (penalty scored); Kawasumi (penalty missed)

== Squad statistics ==
=== Appearances ===
As of November 7, 2021

No.	Pos.	Nat.	Player	NWSL		Playoffs		Challenge Cup		Total	
No.	Pos.	Nat.	Player	Apps	Starts	Apps	Starts	Apps	Starts	Apps	Starts
1	GK	(Canada)	Kailen Sheridan	16	16	1	1	0	0	17	17
2	MF	(United States)	Brianna Pinto	10	0	0	0	0	0	10	0
3	DF	(United States)	Caprice Dydasco	24	23	1	1	5	4	30	28
4	FW	(United States)	Paige Monaghan	12	5	1	0	5	5	18	10
5	MF	(United States)	Nicole Baxter	0	0	0	0	1	1	1	1
6	MF	(United States)	Jennifer Cudjoe	11	6	0	0	5	5	16	11
7	MF	(United States)	McCall Zerboni	20	18	1	1	1	0	22	19
8	DF	(United States)	Erica Skroski	11	7	0	0	1	1	12	8
9	MF	(Japan)	Nahomi Kawasumi	23	18	1	1	5	5	29	24
10	FW	(United States)	Carli Lloyd	12	12	1	1	4	4	17	17
11	MF	(South Korea)	Lee So-dam	14	5	0	0	4	4	18	9
12	DF	(United States)	Gina Lewandowski	20	20	1	1	5	5	26	26
13	GK	(Bosnia and Herzegovina)	DiDi Haracic	8	8	0	0	5	5	13	13
15	DF	(Mexico)	Sabrina Flores	5	3	0	0	3	0	8	3
16	MF	(United States)	Allie Long	21	21	1	1	2	1	24	23
17	MF	(United States)	Domi Richardson	7	0	0	0	2	0	9	0
18	MF	(United States)	Delanie Sheehan	6	2	0	0	0	0	6	2
19	MF	(United States)	Elizabeth Eddy	17	5	1	0	3	0	21	5
20	FW	(Canada)	Évelyne Viens	13	3	1	0	3	0	17	3
21	GK	(United States)	Mandy McGlynn	1	0	0	0	0	0	1	0
22	DF	(United States)	Mandy Freeman	10	8	1	0	4	4	15	12
23	FW	(United States)	Margaret Purce	16	16	1	1	4	4	21	21
24	DF	(Cameroon)	Estelle Johnson	19	19	1	1	3	1	23	21
25	FW	(Nigeria)	Ifeoma Onumonu	24	21	1	1	5	1	30	23
27	MF	(France)	Gaëtane Thiney	12	8	1	0	0	0	13	8
28	DF	(United States)	Imani Dorsey	15	13	1	1	5	5	21	19
Players who went out on loan or left permanently but made appearances for Gotham prior to departing
18	MF	(United States)	Taylor Aylmer	0	0	0	0	1	0	1	0
Total				24		1		5		30	

=== Goals ===
As of November 7, 2021

No.	Nat.	Pos.	Player	NWSL		Playoffs		Challenge Cup	Total		
No.	Nat.	Pos.	Player	23	(United States)	FW	Margaret Purce	9	0	2	11
25	(Nigeria)	FW	Ifeoma Onumonu	8		0		0	8		
10	(United States)	FW	Carli Lloyd	4		0		2	6		
4	(United States)	FW	Paige Monaghan	1		0		1	2		
27	(France)	MF	Gaëtane Thiney	2		0		0	2		
3	(United States)	DF	Caprice Dydasco	1		0		0	1		
7	(United States)	MF	McCall Zerboni	1		0		0	1		
9	(Japan)	MF	Nahomi Kawasumi	1		0		0	1		
16	(United States)	MF	Allie Long	1		0		0	1		
17	(United States)	MF	Domi Richardson	1		0		0	1		
20	(Canada)	FW	Évelyne Viens	0		0		1	1		
Own goals				0		0		0	0		
Total				29		0		6	35		

=== Assists ===
As of November 7, 2021

No.	Nat.	Pos.	Player	NWSL		Playoffs		Challenge Cup	Total		
No.	Nat.	Pos.	Player	25	(Nigeria)	FW	Ifeoma Onumonu	4	0	2	6
3	(United States)	DF	Caprice Dydasco	5		0		0	5		
9	(Japan)	MF	Nahomi Kawasumi	4		0		0	4		
20	(Canada)	FW	Évelyne Viens	3		0		0	3		
28	(United States)	DF	Imani Dorsey	0		0		2	2		
4	(United States)	FW	Paige Monaghan	0		0		1	1		
6	(Ghana)	MF	Jennifer Cudjoe	0		0		1	1		
7	(United States)	MF	McCall Zerboni	1		0		0	1		
10	(United States)	MF	Carli Lloyd	1		0		0	1		
18	(United States)	MF	Delanie Sheehan	1		0		0	1		
19	(United States)	MF	Elizabeth Eddy	1		0		0	1		
23	(United States)	FW	Margaret Purce	1		0		0	1		
24	(Cameroon)	DF	Estelle Johnson	1		0		0	1		

=== Shutouts ===
As of November 7, 2021

No.	Nat.	Player	NWSL	Playoffs	Challenge Cup	Total							
No.	Nat.	Player	NWSL	Playoffs	Challenge Cup	Total	1	(Canada)	Kailen Sheridan	6	0	0	6
13	(Bosnia and Herzegovina)	DiDi Haracic	2	0	3	5							
21	(United States)	Mandy McGlynn	0	0	0	0							

=== Disciplinary record ===
As of November 7, 2021

No.	Pos.	Nat.	Player	NWSL		Playoffs		Challenge Cup		Total	
No.	Pos.	Nat.	Player	Booked	Sent off (straight red)	Booked	Sent off (straight red)	Booked	Sent off (straight red)	Booked	Sent off (straight red)
1	GK	(Canada)	Kailen Sheridan	1	0	0	0	0	0	1	0
3	DF	(United States)	Caprice Dydasco	3	0	0	0	1	0	4	0
4	FW	(United States)	Paige Monaghan	2	0	0	0	0	0	2	0
6	MF	(Ghana)	Jennifer Cudjoe	2	0	0	0	2	0	4	0
7	MF	(United States)	McCall Zerboni	1	0	0	0	0	0	1	0
8	DF	(United States)	Erica Skroski	1	0	0	0	1	0	2	0
9	MF	(Japan)	Nahomi Kawasumi	1	0	0	0	0	0	1	0
10	FW	(United States)	Carli Lloyd	3	0	1	0	0	0	4	0
11	MF	(South Korea)	Lee So-dam	2	0	0	0	0	0	2	0
12	DF	(United States)	Gina Lewandowski	1	0	0	0	1	0	2	0
16	MF	(United States)	Allie Long	6	0	0	0	0	0	6	0
20	FW	(Canada)	Évelyne Viens	1	0	0	0	0	0	1	0
22	DF	(United States)	Mandy Freeman	1	0	1	0	0	0	2	0
23	FW	(United States)	Margaret Purce	4	0	0	0	0	0	4	0
24	DF	(Cameroon)	Estelle Johnson	1	0	1	0	0	0	2	0
25	FW	(Nigeria)	Ifeoma Onumonu	3	0	0	0	0	0	3	0
27	MF	(France)	Gaëtane Thiney	1	0	0	0	0	0	1	0
28	DF	(United States)	Imani Dorsey	4	0	0	0	0	0	4	0
Total				38	0	3	0	5	0	46	0

== Transfers ==
=== 2021 NWSL Draft ===
Round	Pick	Nat.	Player	Pos.	College
1	3	(United States)	Brianna Pinto	MF	University of North Carolina
3	23	(United States)	Taryn Torres	MF	University of Virginia
4	33	(United States)	Delanie Sheehan	DF	UCLA
4	40	(United States)	Tess Boade	FW	Duke University

=== Transfers in ===
Date	Nat.	Player	Pos.	Previous club	Fee/notes	Ref.
January 5, 2021	(South Korea)	Lee So-dam	MF	(South Korea) Hyundai Steel Red Angels	Free agent	
January 13, 2021	(Ghana)	Jennifer Cudjoe	MF	(United States) Racing Louisville FC	Trade for allocation money and 13th overall pick in the 2021 NWSL Draft	
April 9, 2021	(United States)	Taylor Aylmer	MF	(United States) Rutgers Scarlet Knights	National team replacement player	
April 9, 2021	(United States)	Claire Winter	MF	(United States) UCLA Bruins	National team replacement player	
April 27, 2021	(United States)	Allie Long	MF	(United States) OL Reign	Trade for allocation money and 2nd round pick in the 2022 NWSL Draft	
June 4, 2021	(United States)	Brianna Pinto	MF	(United States) University of North Carolina	Draft pick. Signed two-year contract.	
July 8, 2021	(United States)	Delanie Sheehan	MF	(United States) UCLA	Draft pick. National team replacement player.	

=== Transfers out ===
Date	Nat.	Player	Pos.	Destination club	Fee/notes	Ref.
November 12, 2020	(Ghana)	Jennifer Cudjoe	MF	(United States) Racing Louisville FC	2020 NWSL Expansion Draft	
November 12, 2020	(United States)	Kaleigh Riehl	DF	(United States) Racing Louisville FC	2020 NWSL Expansion Draft	
December 29, 2020	(United States)	Mallory Pugh	FW	(United States) Chicago Red Stars	Trade for draft picks and International slots	
December 29, 2020	(United States)	Sarah Woldmoe	MF	(United States) Chicago Red Stars	Trade for draft picks and International slots	

=== Loans in ===
Start date	End date	Pos.	No.	Nat.	Player	From club	Ref.
June 8, 2021	End of season	MF	27	(France)	Gaëtane Thiney	(France) Paris FC	

=== Loans out ===
Start date	End date	Pos.	No.	Nat.	Player	Destination club	Ref.
August 28, 2020	February 28, 2021	FW	20	(Canada)	Évelyne Viens	(France) Paris FC	

=== New contracts ===
Date	Nat.	Player	Pos.	Ref.
December 10, 2020	(United States)	Nicole Baxter	MF	
December 14, 2020	(United States)	Kenie Wright	MF	
December 16, 2020	(Japan)	Nahomi Kawasumi	MF	
December 18, 2020	(United States)	Mandy Freeman	DF	
December 21, 2020	(Nigeria)	Ifeoma Onumonu	FW	
December 22, 2020	(United States)	Gina Lewandowski	DF	
January 20, 2021	(United States)	Caprice Dydasco	DF	
January 26, 2021	(United States)	McCall Zerboni	MF	
January 28, 2021	(United States)	Megan Hinz	GK	
January 29, 2021	(Bosnia and Herzegovina)	DiDi Haracic	GK	

== Awards ==
=== NWSL annual awards ===
- Best XI: (Canada) Kailen Sheridan, (United States) Caprice Dydasco, (United States) Margaret Purce
- Second XI: (Nigeria) Ifeoma Onumonu
- Defender of the Year: (United States) Caprice Dydasco

=== Monthly awards ===
==== NWSL Player of the Month ====
Month	Player	Ref.
October	(United States) Margaret Purce	

==== NWSL Team of the Month ====
Month	Player(s)	Ref.
May	(Canada) Kailen Sheridan (United States) Caprice Dydasco	
June	(United States) Caprice Dydasco	
July	(United States) Caprice Dydasco (United States) Allie Long	
August	(United States) Caprice Dydasco (Nigeria) Ifeoma Onumonu	
September	(Canada) Kailen Sheridan (Cameroon) Estelle Johnson	
October	(United States) Caprice Dydasco (United States) Margaret Purce	

=== Weekly awards ===
==== Challenge Cup ====
===== Save of the Week =====
Week	Player	Ref.
5	(Bosnia and Herzegovina) DiDi Haracic	

==== National Women's Soccer League ====
===== NWSL Player of the Week =====
Week	Player	Ref.
1	(United States) Margaret Purce	
13	(Nigeria) Ifeoma Onumonu	
21	(United States) Margaret Purce	

===== NWSL Save of the Week =====
Week	Player	Ref.
3	(Canada) Kailen Sheridan	
8	(Bosnia and Herzegovina) DiDi Haracic	
22	(Canada) Kailen Sheridan	
