= 2022 NJ/NY Gotham FC season =

NJ/NY Gotham FC
2022 season
- Club Chair: Tammy Murphy
- Head coach: Scott Parkinson (until August 11); Hue Menzies (interim) (from August 13)
- Stadium: Red Bull Arena; Harrison, New Jersey (Capacity: 25,000)
- NWSL: 12th
- Challenge Cup: Group stage
- Top goalscorer: League: Margaret Purce (3); Paige Monaghan (3); McCall Zerboni (3); All: Margaret Purce (4); Kristie Mewis (4)
- Highest home attendance: 7,145 (June 19 vs. SD)
- Lowest home attendance: 2,130 (Sept. 11 vs. KC)
- Average home league attendance: 4,415
Home colors	Away colors

The 2022 NJ/NY Gotham FC season was the team's 13th season as a professional women's soccer team and their tenth season as a member of the National Women's Soccer League, the top division of women's soccer in the United States.

== Background ==
=== Ownership changes ===
After retiring as a player for Gotham FC, Carli Lloyd joined the ownership group on April 27, 2022. On May 4, 2022, NBA player Kevin Durant and investor Rich Kleiman announced their minority investment into Gotham FC via their investment company Thirty Five Ventures. On July 29, 2022, WNBA player Sue Bird joined Gotham FC's ownership group as a minority owner, consultant, and advisor. On August 10, 2022, Gotham FC announced the addition of former New York Giants quarterback Eli Manning and Giants chief commercial officer Pete Guelli to its ownership group as minority owners. The investments raised the club's valuation to an estimated $40 million.

=== Coaching changes ===
On August 11, 2022, Gotham FC fired head coach Scott Parkinson following a 4–8–0 start to the 2021 season and announced an immediate search for a new coach to be hired for the 2023 season. On August 13, 2022, the club named former Jamaica women's national football team coach Hue Menzies as interim head coach.

=== Management changes ===
On August 17, 2022, Gotham FC named Nathán Goldberg Crenier as its new assistant general manager, replacing Stephanie Lee, who left to become the NWSL's director of player affairs.

== Team ==
=== First-team roster ===
As of August 23, 2022

No.	Name	Nationality	Position(s)	Date of birth (age)	Signed from	Notes (Note: denotes a season-ending injury.)
Goalkeepers
1	Michelle Betos	(United States)	GK	February 20, 1988 (age 38)	(United States) Free agency	
18	Ashlyn Harris	(United States)	GK	October 19, 1985 (age 40)	(United States) Orlando Pride	
51	Hensley Hancuff	(United States)	GK	August 3, 2000 (age 25)	(United States) Clemson	
Defenders
11	Ali Krieger	(United States)	CB/LB	July 28, 1984 (age 41)	(United States) Orlando Pride	
15	Sabrina Flores	(Mexico)	RB/LB	January 31, 1996 (age 30)	(Spain) Sevilla	
21	Ellie Jean	(United States)	FB	January 31, 1997 (age 29)	(Netherlands) PSV Eindhoven	
22	Mandy Freeman	(United States)	CB	March 23, 1995 (age 31)	(United States) USC Trojans	
24	Estelle Johnson	(Cameroon)	CB	July 21, 1988 (age 37)	(United States) Washington Spirit	
27	Kelly Ann Livingstone	(United States)	DF	November 23, 1998 (age 27)	(United States) Georgetown	
28	Imani Dorsey	(United States)	LB/LW	March 21, 1996 (age 30)	(United States) Duke Blue Devils	
	Bruninha	(Brazil)	RB	June 16, 2002 (age 23)	(Brazil) Santos FC	
Midfielders
5	Nicole Baxter	(United States)	DM/CM/AM	May 24, 1994 (age 32)	(Sweden) Asarums IF	
6	Jennifer Cudjoe	(Ghana)	CM/AM	March 7, 1994 (age 32)	(United States) Racing Louisville	
7	McCall Zerboni (captain)	(United States)	CM/AM	December 13, 1986 (age 39)	(United States) North Carolina Courage	
8	Taryn Torres	(United States)	MF	April 23, 1999 (age 27)	(United States) University of Virginia	
9	Nahomi Kawasumi	(Japan)	LW/AM/FW	September 23, 1985 (age 40)	(United States) OL Reign	
14	Delanie Sheehan	(United States)	MF	January 13, 1999 (age 27)	(United States) UCLA	
16	Allie Long	(United States)	CM	August 13, 1987 (age 38)	(United States) OL Reign	On maternity leave
17	Domi Richardson	(United States)	DM/CM/CB	October 18, 1992 (age 33)	Free agent	
19	Kristie Mewis	(United States)	AM	February 25, 1991 (age 35)	(United States) San Diego Wave FC	
	Victoria Pickett	(Canada)	MF	August 12, 1996 (age 29)	(United States) Kansas City Current	
Forwards
2	Cameron Tucker	(United States)	FW	July 15, 1999 (age 26)	(United States) BYU	
4	Paige Monaghan	(United States)	RW/FW	November 13, 1996 (age 29)	(United States) Butler Bulldogs	
13	Kumi Yokoyama	(Japan)	FW	August 13, 1993 (age 32)	(United States) Washington Spirit	
20	Taylor Smith	(United States)	FW	December 1, 1993 (age 32)	(United States) North Carolina Courage	Claimed off waivers
20	Évelyne Viens	(Canada)	FW	February 6, 1997 (age 29)	(United States) South Florida Bulls	Loaned to Kristianstads DFF
23	Margaret Purce	(United States)	RW/LW/FW/RB	September 18, 1995 (age 30)	(United States) Portland Thorns FC	
25	Ifeoma Onumonu	(Nigeria)	FW	February 25, 1994 (age 32)	(United States) OL Reign	
44	Jenna Bike	(United States)	FW	February 2, 1998 (age 28)	(United States) Boston College Eagles	

=== Staff ===
As of August 17, 2022

Front Office
Position	Name
General manager and head of soccer operations	(United States) Yael Averbuch West
Interim head of business operations	(United States) Kristin Bernert
Assistant general manager	(United States) Nathán Goldberg Crenier
Director of communications	(United States) Mike Kowalsky
Technical Staff
Interim head coach	(England) Hue Menzies
Assistant coach	(United States) Beverly Goebel Yanez
Assistant coach	(England) Becki Tweed
Goalkeeper coach	(Australia) Brody Sams
High performance director	(United States) Philip Congleton
Head physical therapist	(United States) Joelle Muro
Head athletic trainer	(United States) Sara Carpentieri

== Competitions ==
=== Challenge Cup ===
==== Standings ====
Pos	Team	Pld	W	T	L	GF	GA	GD	Pts	Qualification	NC	WAS	NJY	ORL
1	North Carolina Courage	6	3	3	0	12	7	+5	12	Advance to knockout stage	—	2–2	2–0	1–0
2	Washington Spirit	6	2	4	0	12	7	+5	10	Advance to knockout stage based on ranking	2–2	—	1–1	4–1
3	NJ/NY Gotham FC	6	1	3	2	5	8	−3	6		1–1	1–3	—	1–1
4	Orlando Pride	6	0	2	4	4	11	−7	2		2–4	0–0	0–1	—

Source: NWSL
Rules for classification: 1) Total points; 2) Total goal differential; 3) Total number of goals scored; 4) Head-to-head points record; 5) Head-to-head goal differential; 6) Head-to-head number of goals scored; 7) Fewest disciplinary points; 8) Drawing of lots

==== Matches ====
March 19, 2022	North Carolina Courage	2–0	NJ/NY Gotham FC	Cary, North Carolina
19:00 EST	Pinto 22' (Pickett); Erceg 51' (Berkely)	Report	Cudjoe (yellow card) 46'	Stadium: WakeMed Soccer Park; Attendance: 2,537; Referee: Karen Callado

March 25, 2022	Washington Spirit	1–1	NJ/NY Gotham FC	Leesburg, Virginia
19:30 EST	Brooks (yellow card) 37' (yellow-red card) 65'; Rodman (yellow card) 55'; Hatch 61'	Report	Mewis 23' (pen.); Lewandowski (yellow card) 90+1'; Torres (yellow card) 90+3'	Stadium: Segra Field; Attendance: 3,421; Referee: Alyssa Nichols

March 30, 2022	Orlando Pride	0–1	NJ/NY Gotham FC	Orlando, Florida
19:00 EST	Strom (yellow card) 4'	Report	Krieger (yellow card) 26'; Zerboni (yellow card) 53'; Purce 83' (Jean)	Stadium: Exploria Stadium; Attendance: 3,551; Referee: Anya Voigt

April 3, 2022	NJ/NY Gotham FC	1–1	North Carolina Courage	Harrison, New Jersey
15:00 EST	Monaghan (yellow card) 24'; Richardson (yellow card) 50'; Cudjoe (yellow card) 80'; Onumonu 84' (Mewis)	Report	Berkely (yellow card) 76'; Debinha 25'	Stadium: Red Bull Arena; Attendance: 1,408; Referee: Laura Rodriguez

April 17, 2022	NJ/NY Gotham FC	1–3	Washington Spirit	Harrison, New Jersey
15:00 EST	Kawasumi 4'; Dorsey (yellow card) 30'	Report	Sanchez 24'; Rodman 39' (O'Hara), 75' (Sanchez); Aylmer (yellow card) 53'	Stadium: Red Bull Arena; Attendance: 2,061; Referee: Elvis Osmanovic

April 23, 2022	NJ/NY Gotham FC	1–1	Orlando Pride	Harrison, New Jersey
19:00 EST	Mewis 45+1' (pen.); Zerboni (yellow card) 72'	Report	Jónsdóttir 10' (James)	Stadium: Red Bull Arena; Attendance: 2,734; Referee: Jeremy Scheer

== Regular season ==
=== Matches ===
May 1, 2022 1	Orlando Pride	0–3	NJ/NY Gotham FC	Orlando, Florida
19:00 EDT	Megan Montefusco (yellow card) 53'	Report	Zerboni 29' (Purce); Purce 30' (Dorsey); Mewis 41' (Purce); Zerboni (yellow card) 78'	Stadium: Exploria Stadium; Attendance: 4,304; Referee: Natalie Simon

May 7, 2022 2	San Diego Wave FC	4–0	NJ/NY Gotham FC	San Diego, California
19:00 PDT	Morgan 45+1' (pen.), 66' (pen.), 70', 90+1'	Report	Dydasco (yellow card) 45+6'; Jean (yellow card) 88'	Stadium: Torero Stadium; Attendance: 5,000; Referee: Alex Billeter

May 14, 2022 3	NJ/NY Gotham FC	v	North Carolina Courage	Harrison, New Jersey
		Report		Stadium: Red Bull Arena
Note: Postponed; 11 players unavailable due to COVID-19 protocols

May 22, 2022 4	NY/NJ Gotham FC	0–1	Racing Louisville FC	Harrison, New Jersey
17:00 EDT	Johnson (yellow card) 19'; Baxter (yellow card) 69'	Report	Milliet 13' (McDonald); Howell (yellow card) 73'; Olofsson (yellow card) 90+4'	Stadium: Red Bull Arena; Attendance: 2,672; Referee: Thomas Snyder

May 29, 2022 5	Angel City FC	0–1	NJ/NY Gotham FC	Los Angeles, California
17:00 PDT		Report	Dorsey (yellow card) 13'; Mewis (yellow card) 18'; Purce (yellow card) 45+2'; Onumonu 57' (Purce)	Stadium: Banc of California Stadium; Attendance: 18,784; Referee: Malik Badawi

June 4, 2022 6	NJ/NY Gotham FC	1–0	Washington Spirit	Harrison, New Jersey
19:00 PDT	Purce 21' (Onumonu); Monaghan (yellow card) 74'; Betos (yellow card) 88'	Report	Goff (yellow card) 90+8'	Stadium: Red Bull Arena; Attendance: 6,433; Referee: John Griggs

June 11, 2022 7	Kansas City Current	1–0	NJ/NY Gotham FC	Kansas City, Kansas
19:30 CDT	Hamilton 84' (Rodriguez)	Report	Torres (yellow card) 53'	Stadium: Children's Mercy Park; Attendance: 5,695; Referee: Samantha Martinez

June 19, 2022 8	NJ/NY Gotham FC	0–3	San Diego Wave FC	Harrison, New Jersey
13:00 EDT	Mewis (yellow card) 44'	Report	Morgan 19' (Kornieck), 43' (Jakobsson); McNabb (yellow card) 31'; Doniak 69' (Morgan); Taylor (yellow card) 82'; van Egmond (yellow card) 86'; Schimmer (yellow card) 88'	Stadium: Red Bull Arena; Attendance: 7,145; Referee: Alyssa Nichols

July 2, 2022 9	NJ/NY Gotham FC	0–3	Chicago Red Stars	Harrison, New Jersey
19:00 EDT	Dydasco (yellow card) 39'; Zerboni (yellow card) 64'	Report	Luebbert 16' (Stevens); DiBernardo 25' (Milazzo); Stevens 84' (Nagasato)	Stadium: Red Bull Arena; Attendance: 3,499; Referee: Matthew Corrigan

July 8, 2022 10	Racing Louisville FC	1–2	NJ/NY Gotham FC	Louisville, Kentucky
17:00 EDT	Lester (yellow card) 58'; DeMelo 67', (yellow card) 90+1'; Howell (yellow card) 85'	Report	Dydasco (yellow card) 23'; Dorsey (yellow card) 24'; Monaghan 25' (Sheehan); Zerboni (yellow card) 43'; Cudjoe (yellow card) 74'; Smith 80' (Kawasumi)	Stadium: Lynn Family Stadium; Attendance: 5,771; Referee: Danielle Chesky

July 16, 2022 11	Portland Thorns FC	5–0	NJ/NY Gotham FC	Portland, Oregon
19:30 PDT	Porter 5'; Moultrie 7' (Ryan); Everett 11' (Weaver); Pogarch (yellow card) 33'; Betfort 65' (Pogarch); Weaver 80'	Report	Dydasco (yellow card) 30'	Stadium: Providence Park; Attendance: 16,870; Referee: Elijio Arreguin

July 31, 2022 12	NJ/NY Gotham FC	2–4	Houston Dash	Harrison, New Jersey
14:00 EDT	Monaghan 4' (Smith), (yellow card) 45+2'; Purce 82' (Jean)	Report	Freeman 18' (o.g.); Groom 36' (Sánchez); Schmidt 70' (Viggiano); Salmon 73' (pen.)	Stadium: Red Bull Arena; Attendance: 5,631; Referee: Adorae Monroy

August 7, 2022 13	Chicago Red Stars	2–0	NJ/NY Gotham FC	Bridgeview, Illinois
15:00 CDT	Milazzo 45+5' (Colaprico); Cook 66' (Pugh)	Report	Mewis (yellow card) 34'; Baxter (yellow card) 89'; Tucker (yellow card) 90+3'	Stadium: SeatGeek Stadium; Attendance: 5,078; Referee: Kevin Broadley

August 14, 2022 14	OL Reign	4–1	NJ/NY Gotham FC	Seattle, Washington
12:00 PDT	Lavelle 15' (Rapinoe); Rapinoe 42' (pen.), 69' (Huitema); Freeman 73' (o.g.); Barnes (yellow card) 87'; Heath (yellow card) 90'	Report	Johnson (yellow card) 24'; Jean (yellow card) 41'; Smith 72' (Onumonu)	Stadium: Lumen Field; Attendance: 7,048; Referee: Matthew Corrigan

August 17, 2022 15	Houston Dash	2–1	NJ/NY Gotham FC	Houston, Texas
17:30 CDT	Salmon 73'; Viggiano 76' (Schmidt); Campbell (yellow card) 79'	Report	Purce (yellow card) 24' (yellow-red card) 58'; Onumonu (yellow card) 58'; Zerboni 80' (Mewis)	Stadium: PNC Stadium; Attendance: 4,753; Referee: Alex Billeter

August 20, 2022 16	NJ/NY Gotham FC	1–2	Orlando Pride	Philadelphia, Pennsylvania
16:00 EDT	Dorsey (yellow card) 42'; Mewis 75' (Kawasumi)	Report	Listro (yellow card) 6'; Celia 49'; Watt 73' (Dougherty Howard)	Stadium: Subaru Park; Attendance: 4,107; Referee: Katja Koroleva

August 28, 2022 17	NJ/NY Gotham FC	1–3	Angel City FC	Harrison, New Jersey
17:00 EDT	Freeman (yellow card) 36'; Monaghan 52'	Report	McCaskill 16'; Roccaro 25'; Emslie 31' (McCaskill); Haračić (yellow card) 72'	Stadium: Red Bull Arena; Attendance: 6,796; Referee: Brandon Stevis

September 4, 2022 3	NJ/NY Gotham FC	0–1	North Carolina Courage	Harrison, New Jersey
17:00 EDT	Dorsey (yellow card) 71'	Report	Nagano 81'; Baisden (yellow card) 84'	Stadium: Red Bull Arena; Attendance: 3,124; Referee: Danielle Chesky
Note: Rescheduled from May 14

September 11, 2022 18	NJ/NY Gotham FC	0–1	Kansas City Current	Harrison, New Jersey
15:00 EDT		Report	Merrick (yellow card) 2'; Mace 78' (pen.)	Stadium: Red Bull Arena; Attendance: 2,130; Referee: Brad Jensen

September 17, 2022 19	Washington Spirit	2–0	NJ/NY Gotham FC	Washington, D.C.
16:00 EDT	Staab (yellow card) 33'; McKeown 51'; Hatch (yellow card) 79'; Sanchez 86'	Report	Monaghan (yellow card) 29'	Stadium: Audi Field; Attendance: 8,781; Referee: Shawn Tehini

September 21, 2022 20	NJ/NY Gotham FC	0–1	OL Reign	Harrison, New Jersey
19:00 EDT	Krieger (yellow card) 57'; Bike (yellow card) 84'	Report	Huitema (yellow card) 24'; Rapinoe 58' (pen.); Huerta (yellow card) 77'; Fishlock (yellow card) 90+1'	Stadium: Red Bull Arena; Attendance: 2,274; Referee: Anya Voigt

September 24, 2022 21	North Carolina Courage	3-0	NJ/NY Gotham FC	Cary, North Carolina
16:00 EDT	O'Sullivan (yellow card) 8'; Debinha 27' (Pickett), 34' (Williams), 81' (Boade)	Report	Torres (yellow card) 32'	Stadium: WakeMed Soccer Park; Attendance: 6,376

October 1, 2022 22	NJ/NY Gotham FC	3–3	Portland Thorns FC	Harrison, New Jersey
15:00 EDT	Kawasumi 39'; Onumonu 56'; Zerboni 74'; Freeman (yellow card) 90 +1'	Report	Smith 44', 45 +1'; Weaver 53'	Stadium: Red Bull Arena; Attendance: 4,752

=== League table ===
Pos	Team	Pld	W	D	L	GF	GA	GD	Pts	Qualification
1	OL Reign	22	11	7	4	32	19	+13	40	NWSL Shield, Playoffs – semi-finals
2	Portland Thorns FC (C)	22	10	9	3	49	24	+25	39	Playoffs – semi-finals
3	San Diego Wave FC	22	10	6	6	32	21	+11	36	Playoffs – first round
4	Houston Dash	22	10	6	6	35	27	+8	36	Playoffs – first round
5	Kansas City Current	22	10	6	6	29	29	0	36	Playoffs – first round
6	Chicago Red Stars	22	9	6	7	34	28	+6	33	Playoffs – first round
7	North Carolina Courage	22	9	5	8	46	33	+13	32	
8	Angel City FC	22	8	5	9	23	27	−4	29	
9	Racing Louisville FC	22	5	8	9	23	35	−12	23	
10	Orlando Pride	22	5	7	10	22	45	−23	22	
11	Washington Spirit	22	3	10	9	26	33	−7	19	
12	NJ/NY Gotham FC	22	4	1	17	16	46	−30	13	

Source: NWSL
Rules for classification: Tiebreakers
(C) Champions

==== Results summary ====
Overall								Home						Away					
Pld	W	D	L	GF	GA	GD	Pts	W	D	L	GF	GA	GD	W	D	L	GF	GA	GD
22	4	1	17	16	46	−30	13	1	1	9	8	22	−14	3	0	8	8	24	−16

Last updated: October 1, 2022.
Source: NWSLsoccer.com

==== Results by matchday ====
Matchday	1	2	3	4	5	6	7	8	9	10	11	12	13	14	15	16	17	18	19	20	21	22
Stadium	A	A	H	H	A	H	A	H	H	A	A	H	A	A	A	H	H	H	A	H	A	H
Result	W	L	L	L	W	W	L	L	L	W	L	L	L	L	L	L	L	L	L	L	L	D
Position	1	7	8	10	10	5	7	8	10	8	9	10	11	11	11	12	12	12	12	12	12	12

Updated to match(es) played on October 1, 2022. Source: NWSL
A = Away; H = Home; W = Win; D = Draw; L = Loss

== Squad statistics ==
=== Goalscorers ===
As of matches played October 1, 2022

Rank	Pos.	No.	Name	NWSL	Cup	Total
1	MF	19	(United States) Kristie Mewis	2	2	4
1	FW	23	(United States) Margaret Purce	3	1	4
3	FW	4	(United States) Paige Monaghan	3	0	3
3	FW	25	(Nigeria) Ifeoma Onumonu	2	1	3
3	MF	7	(United States) McCall Zerboni	3	0	3
6	FW	20	(United States) Taylor Smith	2	0	2
6	MF	9	(Japan) Nahomi Kawasumi	1	1	2
Total				16	5	21

=== Clean sheets ===
As of matches played October 1, 2022

Rank	Pos.	No.	Name	NWSL	Cup	Total
1	GK	18	(United States) Ashlyn Harris	2	1	3
2	GK	1	(United States) Michelle Betos	1	0	1
Total				3	1	4

== Transfers ==
=== NWSL Expansion Draft ===
The 2022 NWSL Expansion Draft was an expansion draft held by the NWSL on December 16, 2021, for two expansion teams, Angel City FC and San Diego Wave FC, to select players from existing teams in the league.

On December 4, Gotham FC traded goalkeeper Kailen Sheridan in exchange for allocation money and roster protection from San Diego Wave FC. On December 8, Gotham FC traded goalkeeper DiDi Haračić in exchange for allocation money and roster protection from Angel City FC.

=== NWSL Draft ===
Round	Pick	Nat.	Player	Pos.	College
2	24	(United States)	Kelly Ann Livingstone	DF	Georgetown
3	34	(United States)	Hensley Hancuff	GK	Clemson
4	46	(Argentina)	Raleigh Loughman	MF	Michigan

=== Transfers in ===
Date	Nat.	Player	Pos.	Previous club	Fee/notes	Ref.
December 6, 2021	(United States)	Ali Krieger	DF	(United States) Orlando Pride	Acquired in exchange for a first-round pick in the 2022 NWSL Draft, a natural third-round pick in the 2023 NWSL Draft, and $50,000 in allocation money.	
December 6, 2021	(United States)	Ashlyn Harris	GK	(United States) Orlando Pride	Acquired in exchange for a first-round pick in the 2022 NWSL Draft, a natural third-round pick in the 2023 NWSL Draft, and $50,000 in allocation money.	
December 16, 2021	(United States)	Kristie Mewis	MF	(United States) Houston Dash (via San Diego Wave FC)	Acquired in exchange for $200,000 in allocation money.	
January 11, 2022	(United States)	Michelle Betos	GK	(United States) Racing Louisville FC	Signed off waivers on a two-year contract.	
January 31, 2022	(United States)	Ellie Jean	DF	(Netherlands) PSV	Signed to one-year contract with one-year option.	
February 17, 2022	(Japan)	Kumi Yokoyama	DF	(United States) Washington Spirit	Acquired in exchange for Gotham FC's natural fourth-round pick in the 2023 NWSL Draft.	
June 24, 2022	(United States)	Taylor Smith	DF/FW	(United States) North Carolina Courage	Signed off waivers.	
June 27, 2022	(United States)	Jenna Bike	FW	(United States) Boston College	Signed as National Team Replacement players.	
June 27, 2022	(United States)	Amanda Visco	FW	(Cyprus) Apollon Ladies F.C.	Signed as National Team Replacement players.	
August 22, 2022	(Canada)	Victoria Pickett	MF	(United States) Kansas City Current	Acquired in exchange for $200,000 in allocation money and a conditional first-round draft pick in the 2023 NWSL Draft.	
August 23, 2022	(Brazil)	Bruninha	DF	(Brazil) Santos FC	Transferred for an undisclosed fee.	

=== Transfers out ===
Date	Nat.	Player	Pos.	Destination club	Fee/notes	Ref.
December 4, 2021	(United States)	Megan Hinz	GK	None	Contracts expired.	
December 4, 2021	(South Korea)	Lee So-dam	MF	None	Contracts expired.	
December 4, 2021	(United States)	Kenie Wright	DF	None	Contracts expired.	
December 4, 2021	(Canada)	Kailen Sheridan	GK	(United States) San Diego Wave FC	Traded in exchange for roster protection in the 2022 NWSL Expansion Draft and $130,000 in allocation money.	
December 6, 2021	(United States)	Brianna Pinto	MF	(United States) North Carolina Courage	Traded in exchange for $125,000 in allocation money.	
December 8, 2021	(Bosnia and Herzegovina)	DiDi Haračić	GK	(United States) Angel City FC	Traded in exchange for roster protection in the 2022 NWSL Expansion Draft and $50,000 in allocation money.	
December 15, 2021	(United States)	Mandy McGlynn	GK	(Sweden) Piteå IF	No transfer terms disclosed. Gotham FC retains NWSL playing rights until 2024 pre-season.	
March 11, 2022	(United States)	Elizabeth Eddy	DF/MF	(United States) Houston Dash	Traded in exchange for a fourth-round pick in the 2023 NWSL Draft.	
August 19, 2022	(United States)	Caprice Dydasco	DF	(United States) Houston Dash	Traded in exchange for $120,000 in allocation money, and up to $150,000, increasing by $10,000 per playoff appearance.	

=== Loans out ===
Start date	End date	Pos.	No.	Nat.	Player	Destination club	Ref.
November 30, 2021	March 28, 2022	DF/MF		(United States)	Elizabeth Eddy	(Australia) Newcastle Jets FC	
December 16, 2021	End of 2022 NWSL season	FW		(Canada)	Évelyne Viens	(Sweden) Kristianstads DFF	

=== New contracts ===
Date	Nat.	Player	Pos.	Terms	Ref.
December 4, 2021	(United States)	Allie Long	MF	Signed two-year contract.	
December 15, 2021	(United States)	Cameron Tucker	MF	Signed two-year contract.	
December 20, 2021	(Cameroon)	Estelle Johnson	DF	Signed one-year contract.	
December 22, 2021	(United States)	Taryn Torres	MF	Signed one-year contract with one-year option.	
January 10, 2022	(United States)	Caprice Dydasco	DF	Signed two-year contract.	
January 12, 2022	(United States)	Domi Richardson	FW	Signed one-year contract with one-year option.	
January 14, 2022	(United States)	Imani Dorsey	DF	Signed two-year contract.	
January 19, 2022	(United States)	Kristie Mewis	MF	Signed three-year contract.	
January 20, 2022	(United States)	Margaret Purce	FW	Signed two-year contract.	
January 20, 2022	(Nigeria)	Ifeoma Onumonu	FW	Signed one-year contract.	
March 14, 2022	(Japan)	Nahomi Kawasumi	MF	Signed two-year contract.	
March 14, 2022	(United States)	Hensley Hancuff	GK	Signed one-year contract with one-year option.	
March 31, 2022	(United States)	Kelly Ann Livingstone	DF	Signed one-year contract with one-year option.	
August 5, 2022	(United States)	Jenna Bike	FW	Signed through the rest of the 2022 season with a one-year option.	
