= Delanie Sheehan =

American soccer player (born 1999)

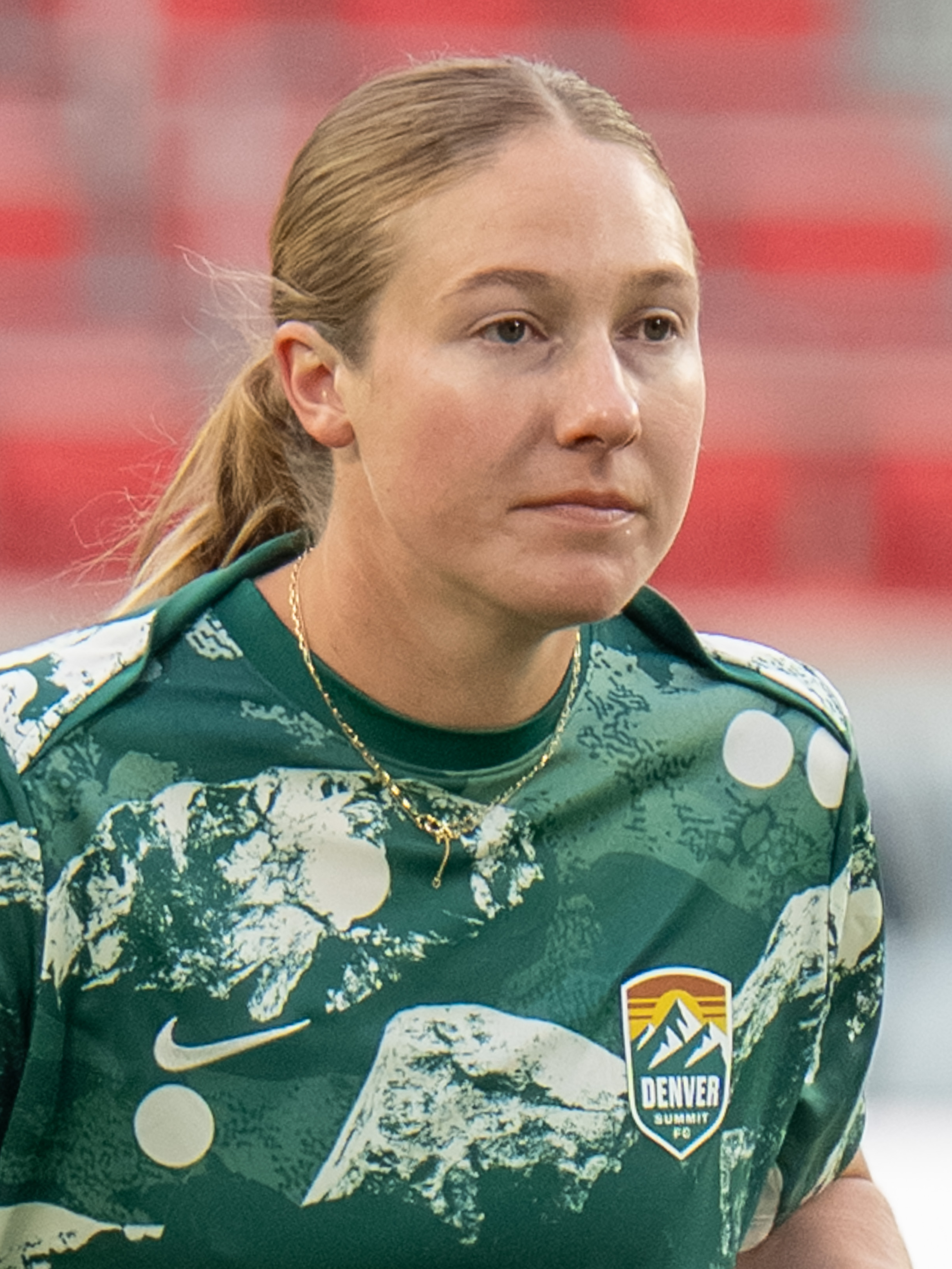
- Sheehan with the Denver Summit in 2026

Personal information
- Full name: Delanie Breann Sheehan
- Date of birth: January 13, 1999 (age 27)
- Place of birth: Walnut Creek, California, U.S.
- Height: 5 ft 6 in (1.68 m)
- Position: Midfielder

Team information
- Current team: Denver Summit
- Number: 24

College career
Years	Team	Apps	(Gls)
2017–2021	UCLA Bruins	86	(15)

Senior career*
Years	Team	Apps	(Gls)
2021–2024	NJ/NY Gotham FC	59	(2)
2021	→ Paris FC (loan)	6	(0)
2025–2026	Houston Dash	26	(1)
2026–	Denver Summit	28	(2)
- * Club domestic league appearances and goals as of 06:41, November 8, 2026 (UTC)

Delanie Breann Sheehan (born January 13, 1999) is an American professional soccer player who plays as a midfielder for Denver Summit FC of the National Women's Soccer League (NWSL). She played college soccer for the UCLA Bruins and was drafted by NJ/NY Gotham FC in the 2021 NWSL Draft. She won an NWSL Championship with Gotham in 2023.

== Early life ==
Sheehan was born in Walnut Creek, California, on January 13, 1999. She started playing soccer at age four. She played high school soccer at Liberty High School in Brentwood, California, and graduated in 2017. She also played softball and basketball in high school. She was a Gatorade State Player of the Year finalist, a three-time North Coast Section (NCS) first-team selection, and a two-time Bay Valley Athletic League (BVAL) MVP in 2015 and 2016. In her senior year, she scored the tying goal in a 3–2 victory over Carondelet in the 2017 NCS Division I championship match.

== College career ==
Sheehan played college soccer at the University of California, Los Angeles, from 2017 to 2021. As a freshman, she was named to the Pac-12 All-Freshman team and scored the tying goal in a 2–3 loss to Stanford in the 2017 NCAA Division I tournament final. In her sophomore year, she switched positions to play as a defender and was named to the All-Pac-12 third team. She was selected as the Pac-12 Defensive Player of the Week in October 2018 and September 2019.

Sheehan began playing as a midfielder again in her senior year and was the team's vice captain. Helping UCLA win their first Pac-12 Championship in six years, she was named to the All-Pac-12 first team and was the Pac-12 Midfielder of the Year, a Hermann Trophy semifinalist, and a Senior CLASS Award candidate. Over four seasons in college, she tallied 15 goals and 18 assists in 86 appearances.

== Club career ==
=== Gotham FC ===
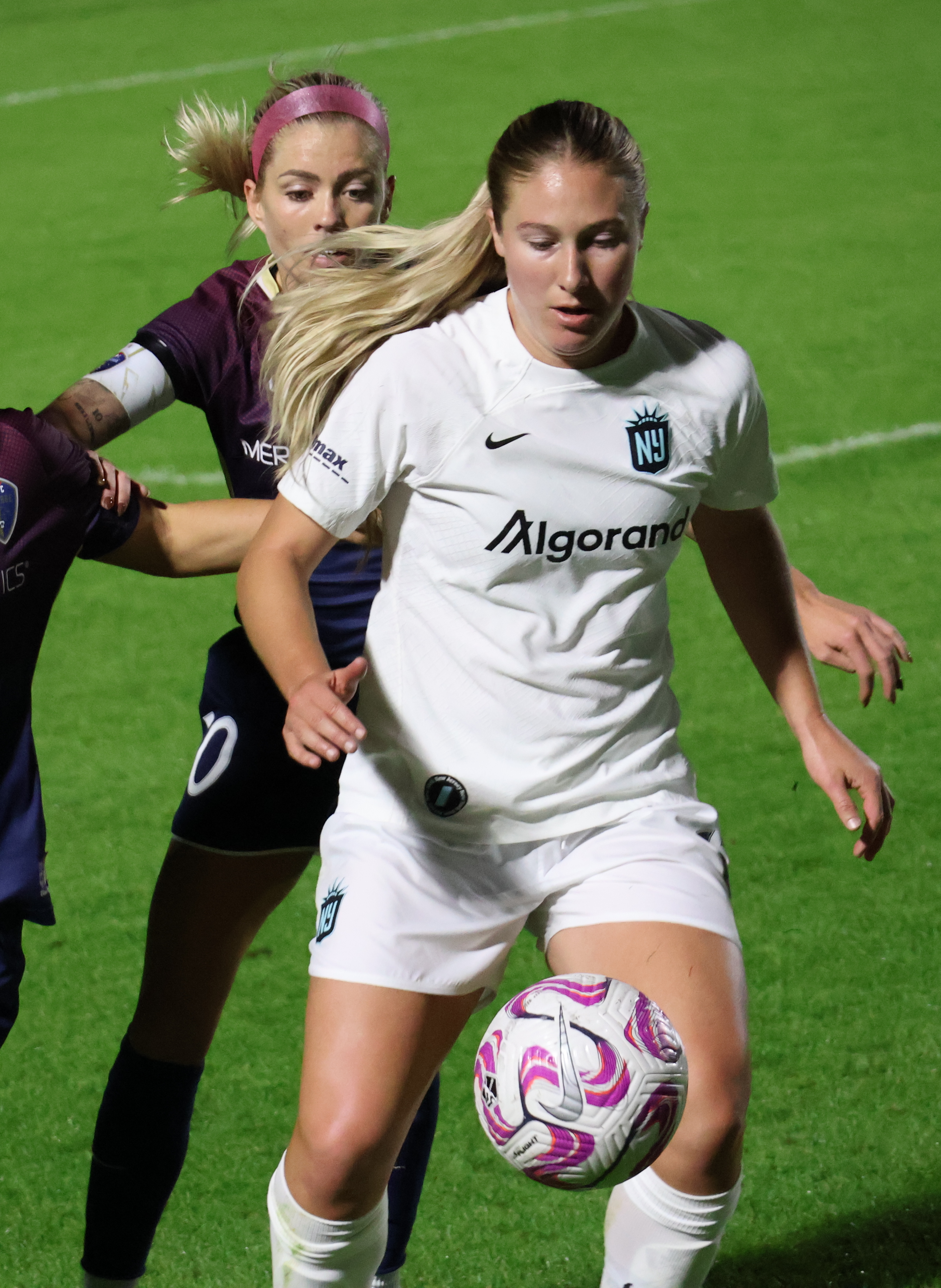
Sheehan playing for Gotham in 2023

NJ/NY Gotham FC (then known as Sky Blue FC) selected Sheehan 33rd overall in the fourth round of the 2021 NWSL Draft, which took place online on her 21st birthday. She signed a national team replacement (NTR) contract with Gotham in July 2021. She made five appearances for Gotham before she was loaned in September to the Division 1 Féminine club Paris FC for the rest of the year, a move that she said she eagerly accepted for the opportunity to improve her tactical skills. She made nine appearances for Gotham in 2022.

Sheehan signed a two-year contract with Gotham in January 2023. That season, she had a regular starting spot in Gotham's lineup, her position varying between forward and attacking midfielder. She scored her first professional goal on October 22, 2023, in the first round of the NWSL playoffs against the North Carolina Courage, notching Gotham's first NWSL postseason goal and helping the team to their first NWSL playoff win.

Sheehan appeared in all 26 games (25 starts) for Gotham during the 2024 season and played the most minutes of any Gotham player in all competitions.

=== Houston Dash ===
On December 4, 2024, the Houston Dash announced that they had signed Sheehan through 2026 with a mutual option for 2027. In her sole season with the Dash, Sheehan made 26 appearances (25 starts) and racked up a total of 2,087 minutes on the field.

=== Denver Summit ===
In March 2026, the Dash traded Sheehan and teammate Yazmeen Ryan to NWSL expansion team Denver Summit FC.

== International career ==
Sheehan was a member of youth national teams at the under-18, under-19, and under-20 levels. She represented the United States under-20 team at the 2018 Sud Ladies Cup.

== Career statistics ==
As of November 2, 2025

Appearances and goals by club, season and competition
Club	Season	League			Cup (Note: Includes the NWSL Challenge Cup and Coupe de France féminine)		Playoffs (Note: Includes NWSL Playoffs)		Continental (Note: Includes CONCACAF W Champions Cup)		Other (Note: Includes NWSL x Liga MX Femenil Summer Cup)		Total		Ref.
Club	Season	Division	Apps	Goals	Apps	Goals	Apps	Goals	Apps	Goals	Apps	Goals	Apps	Goals	Ref.
NJ/NY Gotham FC	2021	NWSL	6	0	0	0	0	0	—		—		6	0	
NJ/NY Gotham FC	2022	NWSL	9	0	1	0	—		—		—		10	0	
NJ/NY Gotham FC	2023	NWSL	18	0	5	0	3	1	—		—		26	1	
NJ/NY Gotham FC	2024	NWSL	26	2	1	0	2	0	4	2	5	1	38	5	
NJ/NY Gotham FC	Total		59	2	7	0	5	1	4	2	5	1	80	6	–
Paris FC (loan)	2021–22	D1F	6	0	0	0	—		—		—		6	0	
Houston Dash	2025	NWSL	25	1	—		0	0	—		0	0	25	1	
Career total			90	3	7	0	5	1	4	2	5	1	111	8	–
