= Nicole Baxter =

American professional soccer player

Personal information
- Full name: Nicole Alexandra Baxter
- Date of birth: May 12, 1994 (age 32)
- Place of birth: Pennington, New Jersey, United States
- Height: 5 ft 4 in (1.63 m)
- Position: Midfielder

Youth career
- 2004–2012: FC Bucks

College career
Years	Team	Apps	(Gls)
2012–2015	William & Mary Tribe	77	(8)

Senior career*
Years	Team	Apps	(Gls)
2016–2017	New Jersey Copa	15	(5)
2018	Telge United FF	22	(3)
2019	Asarums IF	10	(0)
2019–2022	NJ/NY Gotham FC (Note: Sky Blue FC changed its name to NJ/NY Gotham FC in 2021)	9	(0)
- * Club domestic league appearances and goals as of July 4, 2020

Nicole Alexandra Baxter (born May 12, 1994) is an American former professional soccer player who played as a midfielder.

== Early life ==
Raised in Pennington, New Jersey, Baxter played prep soccer at The Pennington School.

== Club career ==
Baxter made her NWSL debut in the 2020 NWSL Challenge Cup on July 4, 2020.

She retired from professional soccer in March 2023.

== Career statistics ==
Club	Season	League			Cup (Note: Includes the NWSL Challenge Cup)		Playoffs (Note: Includes NWSL Playoffs)		Other		Total	
Club	Season	Division	Apps	Goals	Apps	Goals	Apps	Goals	Apps	Goals	Apps	Goals
Telge United FF	2018	Division 1	19	3	—		—		—		19	3
Asarums IF	2019	Elitettan	10	0	—		—		—		10	0
NJ/NY Gotham FC	2019	NWSL	0	0	—		—		—		0	0
NJ/NY Gotham FC	2020	NWSL	—		1	0	—		4 (Note: Includes the NWSL Fall Series)	0	5	0
NJ/NY Gotham FC	2021	NWSL	0	0	1	0	0	0	—		1	0
NJ/NY Gotham FC	2022	NWSL	9	0	1	0	—		—		10	0
Career total			38	3	3	0	0	0	4	0	45	3
