= Mandy Freeman =

American soccer player (born 1995)

- Freeman with Gotham FC in 2026

Personal information
- Full name: Miranda Alexis Freeman
- Date of birth: March 23, 1995 (age 31)
- Place of birth: Royal Palm Beach, Florida, U.S.
- Height: 5 ft 8 in (1.73 m)
- Positions: Right back; center back

Team information
- Current team: Gotham FC
- Number: 22

College career
Years	Team	Apps	(Gls)
2013–2016	USC Trojans	88	(2)

Senior career*
Years	Team	Apps	(Gls)
2017–	Gotham FC (Note: Sky Blue FC changed its name to NJ/NY Gotham FC in 2021 and to Gotham FC in 2025)	133	(1)

International career
2011–2012	United States U17		
2013–2014	United States U20		
2016–2017	United States U23		
- * Club domestic league appearances and goals as of November 1, 2026

Miranda Alexis Freeman (born March 23, 1995) is an American professional soccer player who plays as a right back for and captains Gotham FC of the National Women's Soccer League (NWSL). She played college soccer the USC Trojans, winning the 2016 national championship. She was selected tenth overall by Sky Blue FC (which became Gotham FC) in the 2017 NWSL College Draft. She won her first NWSL Championship in 2023. In 2025, she captained Gotham to the CONCACAF W Champions Cup and NWSL Championship titles.

== College career ==
Freeman played for USC from 2013 to 2016, and she was part of team that won the 2016 NCAA National Championship.

== Club career ==
Freeman was drafted by Sky Blue FC with the 10th overall pick in the 2017 NWSL College Draft. She appeared in 21 games in the 2017 season. Freeman returned to Sky Blue FC for the 2018 season, where she once again appeared in 21 games for the team.

Freeman tore the achilles tendon in her right ankle during preseason training ahead of the 2019 NWSL season, ruling her out for the season.

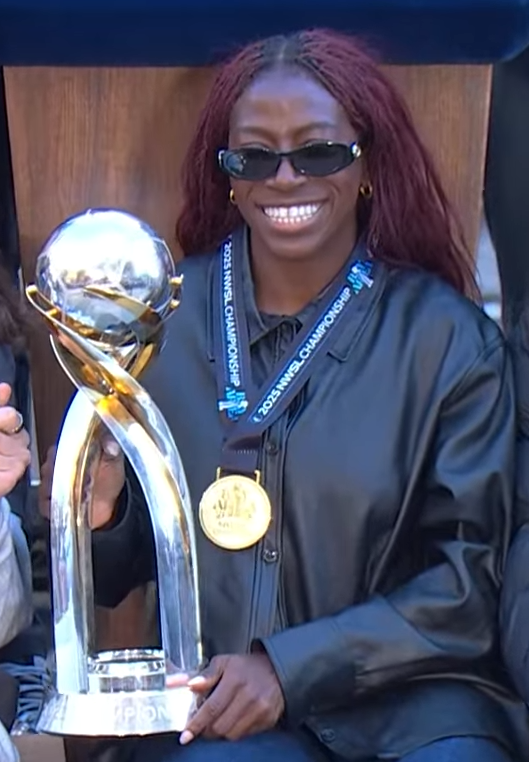
Freeman with the 2025 NWSL Championship trophy

On May 25, 2025, she captained Gotham in the 2025 CONCACAF W Champions Cup final against Tigres, where Gotham won 1–0 to become the inaugural winners of the competition.

== Career statistics ==
=== College ===
Club	Season	Apps	Goals
USC	2013	20	0
USC	2014	20	0
USC	2015	23	2
USC	2016	25	0
Career totals		88	2

=== Club ===
As of April 22, 2023

Appearances and goals by club, season and competition
Club	Season	League			Cup (Note: Includes the NWSL Challenge Cup)		Playoffs (Note: Includes NWSL Playoffs)		Other		Total	
Club	Season	Division	Apps	Goals	Apps	Goals	Apps	Goals	Apps	Goals	Apps	Goals
Gotham FC	2017	NWSL	21	0	—		—		—		21	0
Gotham FC	2018	NWSL	21	0	—		—		—		21	0
Gotham FC	2019	NWSL	0	0	—		—		—		0	0
Gotham FC	2020	NWSL	—		0	0	—		4 (Note: Includes the NWSL Fall Series)	0	4	0
Gotham FC	2021	NWSL	10	0	4	0	1	0	—		15	0
Gotham FC	2022	NWSL	17	0	5	0	—		—		22	0
Gotham FC	2023	NWSL	3	0	0	0	—		—		3	0
Career total			72	0	9	0	1	0	4	0	86	0

== Honors ==
USC Trojans

- NCAA Division I Women's Soccer Championship: 2016

Gotham FC

- NWSL Championship: 2023, 2025
- NWSL Shield: 2026
- NWSL Challenge Cup: 2026
- CONCACAF W Champions Cup: 2024–25
