= Lee So-dam =

South Korean footballer

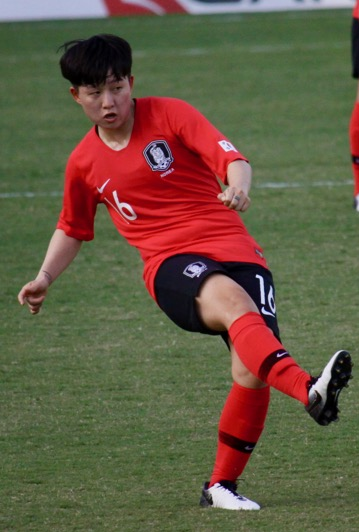

Personal information
- Full name: Lee So-dam
- Date of birth: 12 October 1994 (age 32)
- Place of birth: Icheon, Gyeonggi, South Korea
- Height: 1.57 m (5 ft 2 in)
- Position: Midfielder

Senior career*
Years	Team	Apps	(Gls)
-2017	Gumi Sportstoto		
2018–2020	Hyundai Steel Red Angels	0	(0)
2021	NJ/NY Gotham FC	14	(0)
2022-2024	Gyeongju KHNP WFC	6	(2)

International career^{‡}
2010	South Korea U17	7	(1)
2012–2014	South Korea U20	17	(4)
2013–2019	South Korea	55	(6)
Medal record
Asian Games
Bronze medal – third place	2014 Incheon	Team
- * Club domestic league appearances and goals as of 8 December 2021 ‡ National team caps and goals as of 14 June 2020

- Lee So-dam
- Hangul: 이소담
- RR: I Sodam
- MR: I Sodam

Lee So-dam (Korean: 이소담, Korean pronunciation: [i.so.dam]; born 12 October 1994) is a South Korean former footballer who played as a midfielder.

== Club career ==
Lee joined Incheon Hyundai Steel Red Angels before the start of the 2018 season.

Lee joined American club Sky Blue FC on 5 January 2021 on a one-year contract with an option for a second year. The club rebranded to NJ/NY Gotham FC during her tenure. On 4 December 2021, the club declined to exercise Lee's contract offer, releasing her.

== International goals ==
Scores and results list South Korea's goal tally first.

No.	Date	Venue	Opponent	Score	Result	Competition
1.	21 December 2014	Munhak Stadium, Incheon, South Korea	Maldives	3–0	13–0	2014 Asian Games
2.	21 January 2016	Shenzhen Universiade Sports Centre, Foshan, China	Vietnam	5–0	5–0	2016 Four Nations Tournament
3.	11 November 2016	Hong Kong Football Club Stadium, Hong Kong	Hong Kong	14–0	14–0	2017 EAFF E-1 Football Championship
4.	5 April 2017	Kim Il-sung Stadium, Pyongyang, North Korea	India	9–0	10–0	2018 AFC Women's Asian Cup qualification
5.	28 February 2019	Leichhardt Oval, Sydney, Australia	Argentina	3–0	5–0	2019 Cup of Nations
6.	3 February 2020	Jeju World Cup Stadium, Seogwipo, South Korea	Myanmar	2–0	7–0	2020 AFC Women's Olympic Qualifying Tournament

== Honours ==
- Asian Games Bronze medal: 2014
