= 2026 Gotham FC season =

Gotham FC's seventeenth season

Gotham FC
2026 season
- Operating owners: Carolyn Tisch Blodgett (lead); Ed Nalbandian
- General manager: Yael Averbuch West
- Head coach: Juan Carlos Amorós
- Stadium: Sports Illustrated Stadium; Harrison, New Jersey; (Capacity: 25,000)
- NWSL: 1st (NWSL Shield)
- Top goalscorer: Jaedyn Shaw (11)
- Highest home attendance: 42,175 (vs WAS, Jul 15)
- Lowest home attendance: 4,738 (vs SEA, Jul 18)
- Average home league attendance: 10,943
- Biggest win: 3–0 (vs BAY (H), NWSL, Apr 25)
- Biggest defeat: 0–3 (vs DEN (A), NWSL, Sep 6)
Home colors	Away colors	Third colors
- All statistics correct as of November 1, 2026.

The 2026 Gotham FC season is the team's 17th as a professional women's soccer team and their 12th participating in the National Women's Soccer League (NWSL), the top tier of women's soccer in the United States.

== Team ==
=== Current squad ===
As of November 9, 2026

No.	Nat.	Name	Date of birth (age)	Since	Previous team	Notes (Note: denotes a season-ending injury.)
Goalkeepers
1	(United States)	Shelby Hogan	May 10, 1998 (aged 27)	2025	(United States) Portland Thorns FC	
12	(United States)	Ryan Campbell	March 18, 2002 (aged 23)	2025	(United States) UCLA Bruins	Out on Loan
30	(Germany)	Ann-Katrin Berger	October 9, 1990 (aged 35)	2024	(England) Chelsea	INT
31	(United States)	Teagan Wy	July 30, 2004 (aged 21)	2026	(United States) California Golden Bears	
Defenders
3	(Brazil)	Bruninha	June 16, 2002 (aged 23)	2022	(Brazil) Santos	INT
4	(Spain)	Leila Ouahabi	March 22, 1993 (aged 33)	2026	(United States) Chicago Stars FC	INT
6	(United States)	Emily Sonnett	November 25, 1993 (aged 32)	2024	(United States) OL Reign	
15	(United States)	Tierna Davidson	September 19, 1998 (aged 27)	2024	(United States) Chicago Red Stars	
19	(United States)	Kayla Duran	September 29, 1999 (aged 26)	2025	(United States) USC Trojans	
22	(United States)	Mandy Freeman	March 23, 1995 (aged 30)	2017	(United States) USC Trojans	
27	(England)	Jess Carter	October 27, 1997 (aged 28)	2024	(England) Chelsea	INT
Midfielders
5	(Republic of Ireland)	Denise O'Sullivan	February 4, 1994 (aged 32)	2026	(England) Liverpool	INT
7	(United States)	Jaelin Howell	November 21, 1999 (aged 26)	2025	(United States) Seattle Reign FC	
8	(United States)	Taryn Torres	April 23, 1999 (aged 26)	2021	(United States) Virginia Cavaliers	
10	(United States)	Jaedyn Shaw	November 20, 2004 (aged 21)	2025	(United States) North Carolina Courage	
13	(United States)	Savannah McCaskill	July 31, 1996 (aged 29)	2026	(United States) San Diego Wave	
14	(Israel)	Talia Sommer	February 19, 2004 (aged 22)	2026	(United States) Butler Bulldogs	INT
16	(United States)	Rose Lavelle	May 14, 1995 (aged 30)	2024	(United States) OL Reign	
21	(United States)	Sofia Cook	August 7, 2004 (aged 21)	2025	(United States) UCLA Bruins	
25	(United States)	Meredith Speck	February 1, 1993 (aged 33)	2026	(United States) North Carolina Courage	
28	(United States)	Tess Boade	February 3, 1999 (aged 27)	2026	(United States) Bay FC	
Forwards
2	(United States)	Jordynn Dudley	November 21, 2004 (aged 21)	2026	(United States) Florida State Seminoles	
17	(United States)	Mak Whitham	July 27, 2010 (aged 15)	2024	(United States) Slammers FC HB Køge	U18- Out on loan
18	(Norway)	Guro Reiten	July 26, 1994 (aged 31)	2026	(England) Chelsea	INT
20	(Australia)	Sam Kerr	September 10, 1993 (aged 32)	2026	(England) Chelsea	INT
23	(United States)	Midge Purce	September 18, 1995 (aged 30)	2020	(United States) Portland Thorns FC	
24	(United States)	Andrea Kitahata	January 1, 2003 (aged 23)	2026	(United States) Stanford Cardinal	
29	(United States)	Olivia Wingate	January 20, 2000 (aged 26)	2026	(United States) North Carolina Courage	
99	(England)	Princess Ademiluyi	July 14, 2006 (aged 19)	2025	(England) West Ham United	INT - Out on loan

=== Technical staff ===
As of July 9, 2026

Technical staff
Role	Name
President of soccer operations	Yael Averbuch West
Head coach	Juan Carlos Amorós
Lead Assistant coach	Shaun Harris
Assistant coach and analyst	Ak Lakhani
Assistant coach and analyst	Guillermo Amoros
Head goalkeeper coach	Brody Sams
Director of scouting & roster development	Richard Gunney
Head of soccer administration	Max Feldman
Head of player development & management	Anton Blackwood
Strength & conditioning and return to play coach	Eric Gorman

== Competitions ==
Win Draw Loss

=== Regular season ===
March 14 1	Boston Legacy FC	0–1	Gotham FC	Foxborough, Massachusetts
12:30 p.m. EDT (UTC-4)	Caño (yellow card) 29'; St-Georges (yellow card) 40' (red card) 77'; Carabalí (yellow card) 73'; Kaká (yellow card) 88'; Karich (yellow card) 90+2'	Report	Carter (yellow card) 30'; González 55'; Purce (yellow card) 83'; Howell (yellow card) 90+6'	Stadium: Gillette Stadium; Attendance: 30,207; Referee: Jeremy Scheer

March 21 2	Gotham FC	0–0	North Carolina Courage	Harrison, New Jersey
6:30 PM ET	Harper (yellow card) 79'	Report	Jackson (yellow card) 83'	Stadium: Sports Illustrated Stadium; Attendance: 10,796; Referee: Cristian Campo Hernández

March 25 3	Gotham FC	0–2	Denver Summit FC	Harrison, New Jersey
7:00 p.m. MDT (UTC-6)	Reale (yellow card) 39'; Howell (yellow card) 90+5'	Report	Flint (yellow card) 26', (goal) 73'; Kössler 58'; Reid (yellow card) 63'	Stadium: Sports Illustrated Stadium; Attendance: 5,000; Referee: Muhammad Hassan

March 29 4	Gotham FC	0–0	Orlando Pride	Harrison, New Jersey
7:00 PM ET	Duran (yellow card) 69'; Carter (yellow card) 81'; Dudley (yellow card) 87'	Report	Mace (yellow card) 63'	Stadium: Sports Illustrated Stadium; Attendance: 6,009; Referee: Nabil Bensalah

April 4 5	Kansas City Current	2–1	Gotham FC	Kansas City, Missouri
4:00 PM ET	Debinha 37'; Cooper 60'	Report	Shaw 29'	Stadium: CPKC Stadium; Attendance: 11,500; Referee: Katja Koroleva

April 25 6	Gotham FC	3–0	Bay FC	Harrison, New Jersey
10:00 a.m. PDT (UTC-7)	Lema 20' (o.g.); Lavelle 40'; González 45+6' (pen.)	Report	Hutton (yellow card) 74'	Stadium: Sports Illustrated Stadium; Attendance: 7,184; Referee: Natalie Simon

April 29 7	Chicago Stars FC	0–2	Gotham FC	Evanston, Illinois
8:00 PM ET		Report	Dudley 1', (yellow card) 22'; Lavelle 10'	Stadium: Martin Stadium; Attendance: 2,607; Referee: Marie Durr

May 3 8	Gotham FC	1–0	Racing Louisville FC	Harrison, New Jersey
5:00 PM ET	Shaw 16'	Report	O'Kane (yellow card) 7'; Flint (yellow card) 45+5'; McMahon (yellow card) 90+1'	Stadium: Sports Illustrated Stadium; Attendance: 6,193; Referee: JC Griggs

May 9 9	Gotham FC	1–1	Boston Legacy FC	Harrison, New Jersey
6:30 PM ET	Shaw 37'	Report	Olivieri (yellow card) 21'; Smith (yellow card) 28'; Caño 40', (yellow card) 45+2'; Araújo (yellow card) 67'	Stadium: Sports Illustrated Stadium; Attendance: 11,308; Referee: Matthew Thompson

May 15 10	Seattle Reign FC	0–2	Gotham FC	Seattle, Washington
10:00 PM ET		Report	Shaw (yellow card) 22', (goal) 24'; Davidson 57'	Stadium: Lumen Field; Attendance: 6,406; Referee: Alyssa Pennington

May 31 11	Gotham FC	1–0	Houston Dash	Harrison, New Jersey
3:00 PM ET	Dudley 18'; Howell (yellow card) 90'	Report		Stadium: Sports Illustrated Stadium; Attendance: 10,549; Referee: Joshua Encarnacion

July 4 12	San Diego Wave FC	2–0	Gotham FC	San Diego, California
8:45 PM ET	Barcenas 45'; Dali (yellow card) 72'; Byars 90+3'	Report	Sonnett (yellow card) 62'	Stadium: Snapdragon Stadium; Attendance: 10,592; Referee: Jaclyn Metz

July 10 13	Utah Royals	1–3	Gotham FC	Sandy, Utah
10:00 PM ET	Delzer 23'; Del Fava (yellow card) 45+1'; Lacasse (yellow card) 45+7'; Pierre-Louis (yellow card) 75'	Report	González 26' (pen.), 70'; Howell (yellow card) 32'; Purce (yellow card) 63'; Davidson 45+5'	Stadium: America First Field; Attendance: 10,014; Referee: Alexandra Billeter

July 15 14	Gotham FC	1–0	Washington Spirit	New York, New York
8:00 PM ET	Lavelle 37'	Report	Carle (yellow card) 45+4'; Hershfelt (yellow card) 70'; Monday (yellow card) 80'; Rudd (yellow card) 86'	Stadium: Citi Field; Attendance: 42,175; Referee: Jeremy Scheer

July 18 15	Gotham FC	3–2	Seattle Reign FC	New York, New York
12:00 PM ET	Freeman (yellow card) 12'; González 81', 90+4'; Lavelle 90+7'	Report	Fishel 14' (pen.); Mercado 22'; Meza (yellow card) 45'; Dahlien (penalty missed) 57'	Stadium: Icahn Stadium; Attendance: 4,738; Referee: Calin Radosav

July 24 16	Portland Thorns FC	2–2	Gotham FC	Portland, Oregon
10:00 pm EDT	Lyles 21'; Fleming 53'; Müller (yellow card) 56'; Perry (red card) 73'; Arnold (yellow card) 74'	Report	Purce 2'; Carter (yellow card) 40'; Dudley (yellow card) 57'; Kerr 62'; Howell (yellow card) 69'	Stadium: Providence Park; Attendance: 21,743; Referee: Katja Koroleva

July 29 17	Bay FC	0–1	Gotham FC	San Jose, California
10:00 PM ET	Moreau (yellow card) 60'	Report	Purce 2'; Lavelle (yellow card) 81'	Stadium: PayPal Park; Attendance: 12,178; Referee: Servando Berna Rico

August 1 18	Houston Dash	0–1	Gotham FC	Houston, Texas
8:00 PM ET	Boattin (yellow card) 4'; Larisey (yellow card) 90+1'	Report	Kerr (penalty missed) 22', 46'	Stadium: Shell Energy Stadium; Attendance: 7,512; Referee: Lauren Aldrich

August 7 19	Gotham FC	1–0	San Diego Wave FC	Harrison, New Jersey
8:00 PM ET	McCaskill (yellow card) 35'; Shaw 44'	Report		Stadium: Sports Illustrated Stadium; Attendance: 6,329; Referee: Nabil Bensalah

August 14 20	Gotham FC	2–1	Kansas City Current	Harrison, New Jersey
8:00 PM ET	Purce 13'; Kerr 41'	Report	White 1'; Ball (yellow card) 33'	Stadium: Sports Illustrated Stadium; Attendance: 9,622; Referee: Muhammad Hassan

August 23 21	Angel City FC	0–0	Gotham FC	Los Angeles, California
8:00 PM ET	Chilufya (yellow card) 45+5'; Ary Borges (yellow card) 67'	Report	Shaw (yellow card) 59'; Reiten (penalty missed) 87'; Dudley (yellow card) 90+5'	Stadium: BMO Stadium; Attendance: 15,860; Referee: Gerald Flores

August 28 22	Gotham FC	1–1	Portland Thorns FC	Harrison, New Jersey
8:00 PM ET	Shaw 60'; Purce (yellow card) 90+6'	Report	Nijstad (yellow card) 43'; Wilson 75' (pen.); Vignola (yellow card) 90+1'	Stadium: Sports Illustrated Stadium; Attendance: 10,379; Referee: Joshua Encarnación

September 6 23	Denver Summit FC	3–0	Gotham FC	Centennial, Colorado
2:00 PM ET	Yamamoto 50'; Thomas 82'; Ryan 88'	Report		Stadium: Centennial Stadium; Attendance: 12,372; Referee: Calin Radosav

September 11 24	Racing Louisville FC	1–2	Gotham FC	Louisville, Kentucky
6:30 PM ET	Fischer 17'; Weber (yellow card) 45'; Milliet (yellow card) 69'; Morris (yellow card) 90+3'	Report	Reiten 8'; Shaw 46'	Stadium: Lynn Family Stadium; Attendance: 5,748; Referee: Robert Vincze

September 19 25	North Carolina Courage	1–2	Gotham FC	Cary, North Carolina
6:30 PM ET	Staude 69'; Weatherholt (yellow card) 88'	Report	Dudley 8', 90+1'; Davidson (yellow card) 90+5'	Stadium: WakeMed Soccer Park; Attendance: 10,551; Referee: John Matto

September 25 26	Gotham FC	3–1	Chicago Stars FC	Harrison, New Jersey
8:00 PM ET	Purce (yellow card) 20'; Shaw 9', 66'; Kerr 50'; Bruninha (yellow card) 84'	Report	Gasper (yellow card) 14'; Pinto (yellow card) 28'; Dellarose 87'; Johnson (yellow card) 89'	Stadium: Sports Illustrated Stadium; Attendance: 9,176; Referee: Lauren Aldrich

October 4 27	Gotham FC	1–1	Angel City FC	Harrison, New Jersey
12:00 PM ET	Shaw 66'	Report	Niehues (yellow card) 76'; Suarez 90+1'	Stadium: Sports Illustrated Stadium; Attendance: 13,475; Referee: Nabil Bensalah

October 17 28	Washington Spirit	1–0	Gotham FC	Washington, D.C.
12:30 PM ET	Di Guglielmo 70'	Report	Howell (yellow card) 61'; Torres (yellow card) 90+4'	Stadium: Audi Field; Attendance: 19,215; Referee: Abdou Ndiaye

October 25 29	Orlando Pride	1–2	Gotham FC	Orlando, Florida
3:00 PM ET	Washington 65'	Report	Purce 22'; Davidson (yellow card) 45+1', (goal) 62'; Howell (yellow card) 63'	Stadium: Inter.co Stadium; Attendance: 11,544; Referee: Jaclyn Metz

November 1 30	Gotham FC	2–0	Utah Royals	Harrison, New Jersey
3:00 pm MST (UTC-7)	Reiten 9'; Shaw 80', (yellow card) 90+2'	Report	Joseph (yellow card) 64'	Stadium: Sports Illustrated Stadium; Attendance: 11,209; Referee: Alyssa Pennington

==== Regular-season standings ====
Pos	Team	Pld	W	D	L	GF	GA	GD	Pts	Qualification
1	Gotham FC (S)	30	18	7	5	39	23	+16	61	Playoffs and CONCACAF W Champions Cup
2	San Diego Wave FC	30	18	4	8	45	31	+14	58	Playoffs and CONCACAF W Champions Cup
3	Washington Spirit	30	17	4	9	43	28	+15	55	Playoffs
4	Kansas City Current	30	16	5	9	54	39	+15	53	Playoffs
5	Angel City FC	30	15	7	8	54	32	+22	52	Playoffs

Source: NWSL
Rules for classification: 1) points; 2) total goal difference; 3) total wins; 4) total goals scored; 5) head-to-head points; 6) head-to-head goal goals scored; 7) fewest disciplinary points; 8) coin toss (if 2 clubs tied) or drawing of lots (if ≥3 clubs tied).
(S) NWSL Shield

=== Playoffs ===
Quarterfinals
1	Gotham FC	1
8	Seattle Reign FC	0
4	Kansas City Current (a.e.t.)	1
5	Angel City FC	0
2	San Diego Wave FC	0
7	Utah Royals	1
3	Washington Spirit	4
6	Portland Thorns FC	1

Semifinals
1	Gotham FC	1
4	Kansas City Current	2
3	Washington Spirit	2
7	Utah Royals	1

Championship
3	Washington Spirit
4	Kansas City Current

November 8, 2026 Quarterfinals	Gotham FC	1–0	Seattle Reign FC	Harrison, New Jersey
12:30 pm ET	Bugg 4' (o.g.); Shaw (yellow card) 76'; Ouahabi (yellow card) 90'	Report		Stadium: Sports Illustrated Stadium; Attendance: 11,328; Referee: Brad Jensen

November 15, 2026 Semifinals	Gotham FC	1–2	Kansas City Current	New York, New York
3:00 pm ET	Rouse 69' (o.g.); Carter (yellow card) 72'	Report	Bethune 20'; Rodríguez (yellow card) 64'; Hopkins 89'	Stadium: Icahn Stadium; Referee: Alyssa Pennington

== Statistics ==
As of August 14, 2026

=== Appearances and goals ===
Starting appearances are listed first, followed by substitute appearances after the + symbol where applicable.

No.	Pos	Nat	Player	Total		NWSL	
No.	Pos	Nat	Player	Apps	Goals	Apps	Goals
Goalkeepers
1	GK	(United States) USA	Shelby Hogan	3	0	3	0
30	GK	(Germany) GER	Ann-Katrin Berger	17	0	17	0
31	GK	(United States) USA	Teagan Wy	0	0	0	0
Defenders
3	DF	(Brazil) BRA	Bruninha	8	0	1+7	0
6	DF	(United States) USA	Emily Sonnett	13	0	10+3	0
15	DF	(United States) USA	Tierna Davidson	19	2	15+4	2
22	DF	(United States) USA	Mandy Freeman	9	0	1+8	0
27	DF	(England) ENG	Jess Carter	20	0	19+1	0
Midfielders
5	MF	(Republic of Ireland) IRL	Denise O'Sullivan	2	0	0+2	0
7	MF	(United States) USA	Jaelin Howell	20	0	20	0
8	MF	(United States) USA	Taryn Torres	4	0	0+4	0
10	MF	(United States) USA	Jaedyn Shaw	17	5	17	5
11	MF	(United States) USA	Sarah Schupansky	15	0	7+8	0
13	MF	(United States) USA	Savannah McCaskill	20	0	19+1	0
14	MF	(Israel) ISR	Talia Sommer	4	0	0+4	0
16	MF	(United States) USA	Rose Lavelle	18	4	16+2	4
21	MF	(United States) USA	Sofia Cook	13	0	2+11	0
Forwards
2	FW	(United States) USA	Jordynn Dudley	19	2	14+5	2
17	FW	(United States) USA	Mak Whitham	1	0	0+1	0
18	FW	(Norway) NOR	Guro Reiten	15	0	14+1	0
20	FW	(Australia) AUS	Sam Kerr	7	3	5+2	3
23	FW	(United States) USA	Midge Purce	19	3	14+5	3
24	FW	(United States) USA	Andrea Kitahata	6	0	1+5	0
Other players (departed during season, out on loan, season-ending injury etc.)
4	DF	(United States) USA	Lilly Reale	9	0	5+4	0
9	FW	(Spain) ESP	Esther González	15	6	12+3	6
12	GK	(United States) USA	Ryan Campbell	0	0	0	0
19	DF	(United States) USA	Kayla Duran	5	0	4+1	0
34	FW	(United States) USA	Khyah Harper	5	0	0+5	0
99	FW	(England) ENG	Princess Ademiluyi	0	0	0	0

== Transactions ==
=== Loaned out ===
Date	Player	Pos.	Current club	Fee/notes	Ref.
February 3, 2026	(England) Princess Ademiluyi	FW	(England) Ipswich Town	Loaned out through the 2026 calendar year	
July 16, 2026	(United States) Ryan Campbell	GK	(United States) Lexington SC	Loaned out through December 2026	
August 4, 2026	(United States) Mak Whitham	FW	(United States) DC Power FC	Loaned out through the 2026 calendar year	

=== Transfers in ===
Date	Player	Pos.	Previous club	Fee/notes	Ref.
December 9, 2025	(Israel) Talia Sommer	MF	(United States) Butler Bulldogs	First Israeli player to play in the NWSL	
January 2, 2026	(United States) Savannah McCaskill	MF	(United States) San Diego Wave FC	Trade	
January 8, 2026	(United States) Andrea Kitahata	FW	(United States) Stanford Cardinal	First professional contract	
January 16, 2026	(United States) Teagan Wy	GK	(United States) California Golden Bears	First professional contract	
January 26, 2026	(United States) Jordynn Dudley	FW	(United States) Florida State Seminoles	First professional contract	
June 29, 2026	(Australia) Sam Kerr	FW	(England) Chelsea	Free agent signing	
July 1, 2026	(Norway) Guro Reiten	MF	(England) Chelsea	Initially joined on loan before joining permanently in July 2026	
July 14, 2026	(Republic of Ireland) Denise O'Sullivan	MF	(England) Liverpool	Joined on loan with an obligation for a permanent transfer	
August 6, 2026	(United States) Meredith Speck	MF	(United States) North Carolina Courage	Joined as a free agent through the end of the 2026 season	

=== Transfers out ===
Date	Player	Pos.	Destination club	Fee/notes	Ref.
December 22, 2025	(United States) Ella Stevens	FW	(United States) Boston Legacy FC	Out of contract, joined Boston Legacy FC	
March 2, 2026	(Brazil) Gabi Portilho	FW	(United States) San Diego Wave FC	Trade	
March 4, 2026	(Ghana) Stella Nyamekye	FW	(Norway) SK Brann	Transfer, undisclosed	
June 17, 2026	(United States) Lilly Reale	DF	(United States) Boston Legacy FC	Traded in exchange for $350,000 in allocation money and $50,000 in intraleague transfer funds	
June 30, 2026	(United States) Katie Lampson	FW		Retired from professional soccer	
July 27, 2026	(Spain) Esther González	FW		Agreed to a mutual contract termination	
July 28, 2026	(United States) Khyah Harper	FW	(United States) Houston Dash	Free transfer	
