= 2025 CONCACAF W Champions Cup final =

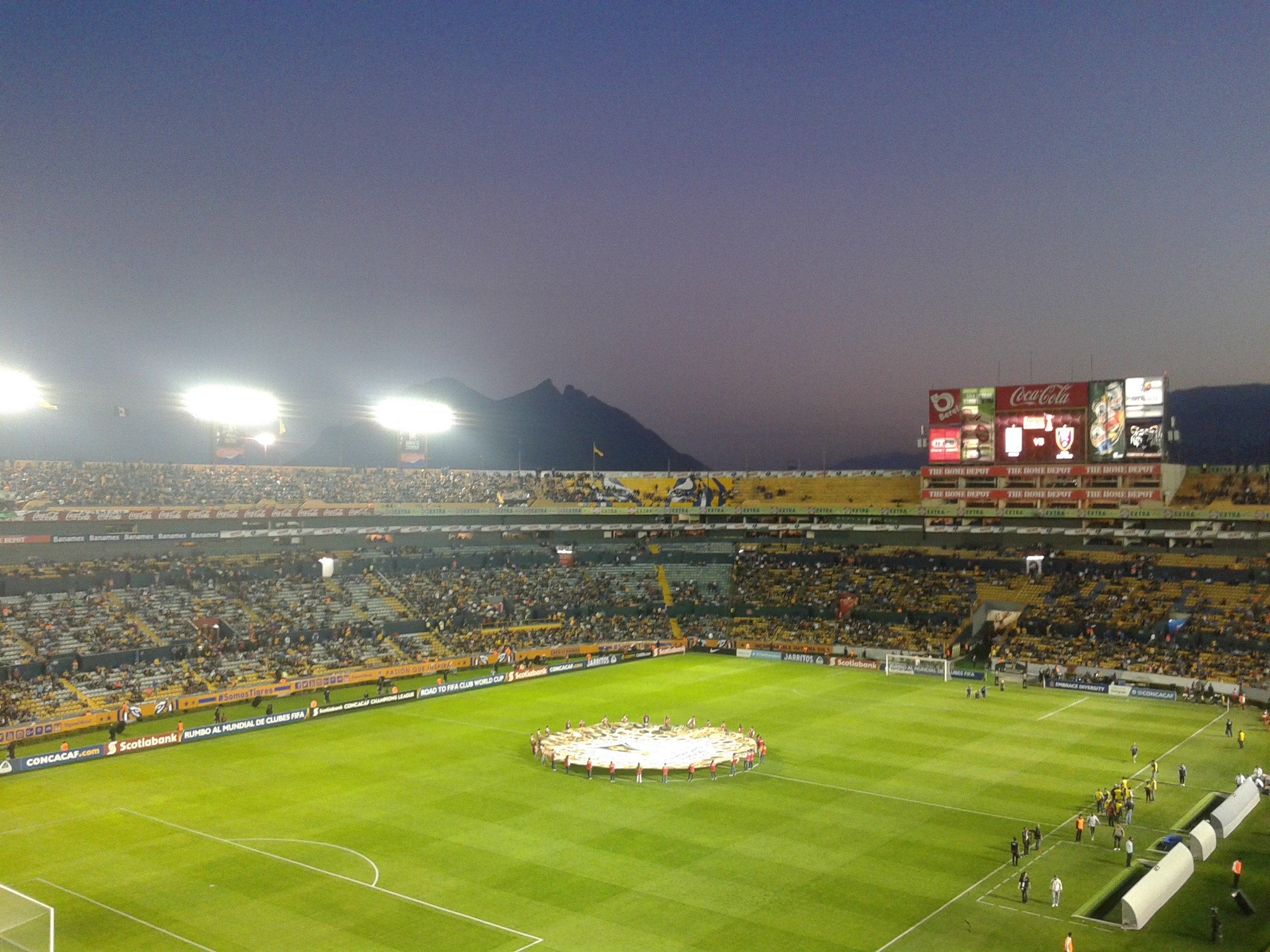
- Estadio Universitario
- Event: 2024–25 CONCACAF W Champions Cup
Tigres UANL	Gotham FC
(Mexico)	(United States)
0	1
- Date: 24 May 2025
- Venue: Estadio Universitario, San Nicolás de los Garza
- Player of the Match: Esther González (Gotham FC)
- Referee: Marianela Araya (Costa Rica)

The 2025 CONCACAF W Champions Cup final was the final match of the 2024–25 CONCACAF W Champions Cup, the 1st season of North America, Central America, and the Caribbean's premier club association football tournament organized by CONCACAF. It was played on 24 May 2025.

The winner, Gotham FC, qualified as a result for both the 2026 FIFA Women's Champions Cup and the 2028 FIFA Women's Club World Cup.

== Match ==
=== Details ===
24 May 2025
21:00 CT

Tigres UANL (Mexico)	0–1	(United States) Gotham FC
	Report	González 82'

Estadio Universitario, San Nicolás de los Garza
Referee: Marianela Araya (Costa Rica)

Tigres UANL	Gotham FC

GK	23	(Mexico) Itzel González
DF	4	(Mexico) Greta Espinoza
DF	6	(Mexico) Jimena López (substituted off) 86'
DF	13	(Portugal) Ana Seiça
DF	22	(Mexico) Anika Rodríguez
MF	8	(Mexico) Alexia Delgado (substituted off) 86'
MF	9	(Mexico) Stephany Mayor (substituted off) 64'
MF	14	(Mexico) Jacqueline Ovalle (c)
MF	32	(Mexico) Aaliyah Farmer
FW	10	(Spain) Jenni Hermoso (substituted off) 64'
FW	16	(South Africa) Thembi Kgatlana (substituted off) 74'
Substitutes:
GK	1	(Mexico) Cecilia Santiago
DF	2	(Mexico) Natalia Colin
DF	3	(Mexico) Bianca Sierra
DF	15	(Mexico) Cristina Ferral	(substituted on) 86'
DF	17	(Mexico) Natalia Villarreal	(substituted on) 86'	(yellow card) 90+1'
MF	11	(Mexico) Nayeli Rangel	(substituted on) 64'
MF	25	(Mexico) Joseline Montoya
MF	26	(Mexico) Andrea Hernández
MF	51	(Mexico) María González
FW	7	(Brazil) Jheniffer (substituted on) 64'
FW	21	(Portugal) Ana Dias (substituted on) 74'
FW	34	(Mexico) Deiry Ramírez
Head coach:
(Spain) Pedro Martínez (yellow card) 69'

GK	30	(Germany) Ann-Katrin Berger
DF	4	(United States) Lilly Reale
DF	6	(United States) Emily Sonnett
DF	22	(United States) Mandy Freeman (c)
DF	27	(England) Jess Carter
MF	7	(United States) Jaelin Howell
MF	11	(United States) Sarah Schupansky (substituted off) 78'
FW	8	(United States) Taryn Torres (substituted off) 78'
FW	9	(Spain) Esther González
FW	10	(Brazil) Geyse
FW	23	(United States) Midge Purce
Substitutes:
GK	12	(United States) Ryan Campbell
GK	26	(United States) Tyler McCamey
DF	3	(Brazil) Bruninha
MF	13	(United States) Ella Stevens (substituted on) 78' (yellow card) 89'
MF	14	(United States) Nealy Martin	(substituted on) 78'
MF	24	(United States) Emerson Elgin
MF	34	(United States) Khyah Harper
FW	17	(United States) Mak Whitham
FW	20	(Portugal) Jéssica Silva
FW	90	(Ghana) Stella Nyamekye
Head coach:
(Spain) Juan Carlos Amorós

Player of the Match:
Esther González (Gotham FC)
