= 2025 Houston Dash season =

Houston Dash
2025 season
- Majority owner: Ted Segal
- President of Women's Soccer: Angela Hucles Mangano
- Head coach: Fabrice Gautrat
- Stadium: Shell Energy Stadium, Houston
- NWSL: 10th
- 2025 Copa Tejas Shield: 6th
- Top goalscorer: League: (United States) Yazmeen Ryan (4 goals} All: (United States) Yazmeen Ryan (4 goals}
- Highest home attendance: 6,406
- Lowest home attendance: 5,084
- Average home league attendance: 6,153
- Biggest win: SAN 0–3 HOU (9/7) NWSL
- Biggest defeat: WAS 4–0 HOU (9/28) NWSL
Home colors	Away colors
- All statistics correct as of 00:51, November 5, 2025 (UTC).

The 2025 Houston Dash season was the team's twelfth season as an American professional women's soccer team in the National Women's Soccer League.

== Season summary ==
=== Pre-season ===
Immediately following the 2024 season, the Houston Dash started their preparation for the 2025 NWSL Season.

Houston began the offseason by strengthening their roster, signing Delanie Sheehan from NJ/NY Gotham FC on December 4, 2024. The next day, Houston started work to extend contracts to players, signing defender Avery Patterson for another three seasons with the team. On December 6, 2024, Houston made two more roster moves agreeing to mutually terminate Elin Rubensson's contract and offering a contract extension to Kiki Van Zanten for another two years with a mutual year option.

On December 9, the Dash announced the hiring of Angela Hucles Mangano, formerly general manager of Angel City FC, to the new role of president of women's soccer. The role's duties included those of the general manager and chief of soccer operations.

On December 10, 2024, Houston made a flurry of moves as they moved forward towards the 2025 season. They signed Christen Westphal in a trade with San Diego Wave FC, giving up a 2025 international slot and $14,000 in allocation money in the trade. The team also extended contracts on defender Jyllissa Harris through the 2027 season with a mutual year option, defender Allysha Chapman through the 2026 season with a mutual year option, and forward Amanda West through the 2026 season with a mutual year contract. Houston also announced the roster decision which included exercising the mutual option on midfielder Sophie Schmidt, unilateral option on goalkeeper Heather Hinz, and contract renewals of forward Michelle Alozie, defender Natalie Jacobs, defender Paige Nielsen, midfielder Bárbara Olivieri, and midfielder Sarah Puntigam. In addition to signings, Houston announced they had agreed to decline the mutual options of forward Paulina Gramaglia, midfielder Andressa, and defender Croix Soto. In addition goalkeeper Erin McKinney and midfielder Havana Solaun were out of contract. Lastly they agreed to mutual contract termination with forward Cece Kizer and midfielder Madison Ayson.

On December 17, 2024, Houston announced they would be taking part in the Coachella Valley Invitational in February 2025 as part of their pre-season games. December 27, 2024 Houston announced they had acquired Yazmeen Ryan.

On January 3, 2025, Houston announced they had hired Fabrice Gautrat as the new head coach headed into the 2025 season.

On January 17, 2025, Houston announced that they had signed Abby Smith. Smith was acquired on a trade with NJ/NY Gotham FC for $20,000 of intra-league transfer funds. On January 21, 2025, Houston Dash announced the signing of midfielder Maggie Graham to a contract through 2027. Graham played her last five years at Duke and is the first collegiate players signed by Houston since the NWSL's new CBA. On the same day, Houston announced the signing of midfielder Danielle Colaprico through the 2026 season. On January 27, Houston announced the signing of forward Messiah Bright from Angel City FC for $100,000 in inter-league transfer funds.

On February 2, Houston announced Tarciane had been traded to Lyon for an undisclosed record fee. On February 10, 2025, Houston announced the signing of Swedish midfielder Evelina Duljan for the 2025 season.

On March 4, Yuki Nagasato announced her retirement from professional football.

=== March/April ===
Houston started their season at home with a 1–2 loss to the Washington Spirit, with Maggie Graham getting the first goal of her career. In their first road game of the year, Houston secured their first win of the season, 2–1 against Chicago Stars FC on the back of goals by Paige Nielsen and Maggie Graham. Houston returned home and earned their first clean sheet of the season, playing NJ/NY Gotham FC to a 0–0 draw. Returning from the international break, Houston fell 1–3 to Angel City FC at home, with Bárbara Olivieri getting her first goal of the season. Houston travelled to the undefeated Kansas City Current, falling 0–2 as Kansas City expanded their regular season undefeated streak to an NWSL record nine game. Houston returned home for a two-game stand, facing Utah Royals FC, earning their first home win of the season 1–0.

=== May/June ===
In their second game of the two game home stance, Houston fell to Racing Louisville FC 1–2 after two long weather delays. Houston travelled to Seattle for their next match, earning a road victory over the Seattle Reign 1–0 on a goal by Graham in the second half. Houston returned home to host Portland Thorns, falling 1–4, with the only goal coming from an Own goal. The next week, Houston hosted Bay FC, earning a 2–2 draw on goals by Avery Patterson and Messiah Bright. On May 30, Houston announced they had transferred Diana Ordóñez to Tigres Femenil for an undisclosed amount. Houston fell in a defensive struggle against the Pride 0–1. On June 12, Houston signed Ellie Ospeck on a short-term contract. Houston hosted San Diego, but fell to the Wave 2–3, with goals from Olivieri and Ryan. Houston ended the first half of the season with another loss falling to North Carolina 1–2 with a goal from Patterson, but lost Puntingam after getting two yellows, and being sent off.

=== July/August ===
On July 22, Houston announced the signing of Canadian international forward Clarissa Larisey from Crystal Palace for an undisclosed fee. Larisey is signed through the 2027 season. Houston returned from the summer break and earned a 2–2 against Bay FC. Getting goals from van Zanten and Schmidt. Houston returned home and earned a dramatic 2–1 win against North Carolina with a stoppage time goal by Schmidt, adding to an earlier goal by van Zanten. On July 11, Houston announced the signing of Italian International Defender Lisa Boattin for an undisclosed amount. Boattin is signed through the 2027 season. On August 22, Houston traded Olivieri to expansion team Boston Legacy FC for $100,000, half of which will come in 2025 and half in 2026. Houston extended their unbeaten streak to four games, earning a 1–1 draw against Seattle Reign, on a goal by Ryan. Houston ended the month of August unbeaten with a 1–1 draw versus Louisville, on a goal by Duljan.

=== September/October ===
Houston continued their good form, with a 3–0 road win versus San Diego. Goals were scored by Larisey, Ryan and Bright. Houston earned a 1–0 win against Chicago on a goal by Ryan, breaking the Stars 8-game unbeaten run. Houston travelled to the nation's capital, falling 0–4 to the Spirit, their worst defeat of the season to date. Malia Berkely scored her first goal for Houston, but the team failed to secure all three points after giving up a late game goal, earning a 1–1 draw against Orlando at home. Houston then travelled to California to face Angel City FC, falling 0–2, ending their chance for a playoff bid. Houston then returned home to face league leading Kansas City, ending their 17 game unbeaten streak with a 1-0 win for their final home game of the season. Houston ended their season with an 0–2 away loss to the Thorns.

== Roster ==
As of October 2, 2025.

No.	Name	Nationality	Position(s)	Date of birth (age)	Signed in	Previous club	Apps	Goals
Goalkeepers
1	Jane Campbell	(United States)	GK	February 17, 1995 (age 31)	2017	(United States) Stanford Cardinal	17	0
3	Liz Beardsley	(United States)	GK	April 23, 2003 (age 23)	2025	(United States) Maryland	0	0
35	Abby Smith	(United States)	GK	October 4, 1993 (age 33)	2025	(United States) NJ/NY Gotham FC	9	0
	Heather Hinz	(United States)	GK	July 27, 2001 (age 25)	2024	(United States) Virginia Tech Hokies	0	0
	Nadia Cooper	(United States)	GK	January 19, 2003 (age 23)	2025	(United States) Minnesota Aurora FC	0	0
Defenders
2	Allysha Chapman	(Canada)	DF	January 25, 1989 (age 37)	2018	(United States) North Carolina Courage	10	0
10	Malia Berkely	(United States)	DF	February 13, 1998 (age 28)	2025	(United States) North Carolina Courage	5	1
14	Paige Nielsen	(United States)	DF	October 14, 1993 (age 33)	2024	(United States) Angel City FC	24	2
20	Christen Westphal	(United States)	DF	September 2, 1993 (age 33)	2025	(United States) San Diego Wave FC	8	0
25	Katie Lind	(United States)	DF	February 15, 1994 (age 32)	2020	(Australia) Perth Glory	16	0
27	Lisa Boattin	(Italy)	DF	May 3, 1997 (age 29)	2025	(Italy) Juventus	4	0
29	Rebeca	(Brazil)	DF	September 1, 2005 (age 21)	2025	(Brazil) Cruzeiro	0	0
42	Anna Heilferty	(United States)	DF	April 17, 1999 (age 27)	2025	(United States) Washington Spirit	4	0
	Natalie Jacobs	(United States)	DF	August 16, 1997 (age 29)	2022	(Spain) Real Betis Féminas	15	0
Midfielders
5	Zoe Matthews (Note: Under-18 Entry Mechanism)	(Jamaica)	MF	May 25, 2007 (age 19)	2024	(United States) Solar SC	0	0
7	Evelina Duljan	(Sweden)	MF	May 12, 2003 (age 23)	2025	(United States) Orlando Pride FC	12	1
8	Delanie Sheehan	(United States)	MF	January 13, 1999 (age 27)	2025	(United States) NJ/NY Gotham FC	24	1
12	Kiki Van Zanten	(Jamaica)	MF	August 25, 2001 (age 25)	2024	(United States) Notre Dame Fighting Irish	15	2
13	Sophie Schmidt (Note: Season ending injury on September 13)	(Canada)	MF	June 28, 1998 (age 28)	2019	(Germany) FFC Frankfurt	9	2
17	Sarah Puntigam	(Austria)	MF	October 13, 1992 (age 34)	2023	(Germany) FC Köln	15	0
19	Belle Briede	(United States)	MF	October 3, 1998 (age 28)	2024	(United States) San Diego Wave FC	0	0
23	Maggie Graham (Note: Season ending injury on September 18)	(United States)	MF	July 10, 2002 (age 24)	2025	(United States) Duke	19	3
24	Danielle Colaprico	(United States)	MF	May 6, 1993 (age 33)	2025	(United States) San Diego Wave FC	23	0
89	Chloe Ricketts	(United States)	MF	May 23, 2007 (age 19)	2025	(United States) Washington Spirit	1	0
	Bárbara Olivieri	(Venezuela)	MF	February 24, 2002 (age 24)	2023	(Mexico) Monterrey	13	2
Forwards
6	Messiah Bright	(United States)	FW	December 12, 2000 (age 25)	2025	(United States) Angel City FC	24	2
9	Clarissa Larisey	(Canada)	FW	July 2, 1999 (age 27)	2025	(England) Crystal Palace	9	1
11	Yazmeen Ryan	(United States)	FW	February 25, 1999 (age 27)	2025	(United States) NJ/NY Gotham FC	21	4
15	Avery Patterson	(United States)	FW	June 14, 2002 (age 24)	2024	(United States) North Carolina Tar Heels	20	3
21	Ryan Gareis	(United States)	FW	November 13, 1998 (age 28)	2022	(United States) South Carolina Gamecocks	17	1
22	Michelle Alozie	(Nigeria)	FW	April 28, 1997 (age 29)	2021	(United States) Tennessee Volunteers	18	0
	Ramona Bachmann	(Switzerland)	FW	December 25, 1990 (age 35)	2024	(France) Paris Saint-Germain F.C. (women)	2	0
	Diana Ordóñez	(Mexico)	FW	September 26, 2001 (age 25)	2023	(United States) North Carolina Courage	3	0
	Ellie Ospeck	(United States)	FW		2025	(United States) Notre Dame	0	0

== Transactions ==
=== Transfers in ===
Date	Nat.	Player	Pos.	Previous club	Fee/notes	Ref.
December 4, 2024	(United States)	Delanie Sheehan	MF	(United States) NJ/NY Gotham FC	2026+ 1 year	
December 10, 2024	(United States)	Christen Westphal	DF	(United States) San Diego Wave FC	2025 International slot and $14,000 Allocation Money	
December 27, 2024	(United States)	Yazmeen Ryan	FW	(United States) NJ/NY Gotham FC	Received Ryan and $80,000 inter-league trade funds in exchange for $400,000 Allocation funds and a 2025 International slot	
January 17, 2025	(United States)	Abby Smith	GK	(United States) NJ/NY Gotham FC	$20,000 Intra-league transfer funds	
January 21, 2025	(United States)	Maggie Graham	MF	(United States) Duke	Free Agent	
January 21, 2025	(United States)	Danielle Colaprico	MF	(United States) San Diego Wave FC	Free Agent	
January 27, 2025	(United States)	Messiah Bright	FW	(United States) Angel City FC	$100,000 Inter-league transfer money	
February 10, 2025	(Sweden)	Evelina Duljan	MF	(United States) Orlando Pride FC	Free Agent	
March 11, 2025	(United States)	Liz Beardsley	GK	(United States) Maryland	Short–term contract	
March 26, 2025	(Brazil)	Rebeca (footballer)	DF	(Brazil) Cruzeiro	2027 + one-year option	
June 12, 2025	(United States)	Ellie Ospeck	FW	(United States) Notre Dame	Short-term contract	
July 22, 2025	(Canada)	Clarissa Larisey	FW	(United States) Crystal Palace	Transfer, undisclosed fee	
August 11, 2025	(Italy)	Lisa Boattin	DF	(Italy) Juventus	Transfer, undisclosed fee	
August 22, 2025	(United States)	Nadia Cooper	GK	(United States) Minnesota Aurora	Short–term contract	
September 12, 2025	(United States)	Malia Berkely	DF	(United States) North Carolina Courage	$75,000 in 2026 intra-league transfer funds	
September 12, 2025	(United States)	Anna Heilferty	DF	(United States) Washington Spirit	Short–term contract	
October 1, 2025	(United States)	Chloe Ricketts	MF	(United States) Washington Spirit	$15,000 in intra–league transfer funds	
October 1, 2025	(United States)	Nadia Cooper	GK	(United States) Minnesota Aurora	Free agent	

=== Transfers out ===
Date	Nat.	Player	Pos.	Destination club	Fee/notes	Ref.
December 6, 2024	(Sweden)	Elin Rubensson	MF	(Sweden) BK Häcken FF	Mutual Contract Termination	
December 10, 2024	(Argentina)	Paulina Gramaglia	FW	(Spain) CD Tenerife	Mutual Option Declined	
December 10, 2024	(Brazil)	Andressa	MF	(Brazil) Corinthians	Mutual Option Declined	
December 10, 2024	(United States)	Croix Soto	DF	(Canada) AFC Toronto	Mutual Option Declined	
December 10, 2024	(United States)	Erin McKinney	GK	(United States) Fort Lauderdale United FC	Out of Contract	
December 10, 2024	(Jamaica)	Havana Solaun	MF	N/A	Out of Contract	
December 10, 2024	(United States)	Cece Kizer	FW	(United States) NJ/NY Gotham FC	Mutual Contract Termination	
December 10, 2024	(United States)	Madison Ayson	MF	(Australia) Canberra United FC	Mutual Contract Termination	
February 2, 2025	(Brazil)	Tarciane	DF	(France) Lyon	Undisclosed Fee	
March 3, 2025	(Japan)	Yuki Nagasato	FW	N/A	Retired	
May 30, 2025	(Mexico)	Diana Ordóñez	FW	(Mexico) Tigres Femenil	Undisclosed Fee	
June 30, 2025	(United States)	Ellie Ospeck	FW	(United States) San Diego Wave FC	End of short–term contract	
June 30, 2025	(Venezuela)	Bárbara Olivieri	MF	(United States) Boston Legacy FC	$100,000	
September 12, 2025	(Switzerland)	Ramona Bachmann	FW	(Switzerland) BSC YB	Mutual agreement	
September 12, 2025	(United States)	Natalie Jacobs	DF	(United States) North Carolina Courage	Transfer	
September 18, 2025	(United States)	Nadia Cooper	GK	(United States) Houston Dash	End of short–term contract	

=== Loan out ===
No.	Pos.	Player	Loaned to	Start	End	Source
18	GK	(United States) Heather Hinz	(United States) Fort Lauderdale United FC	November 9, 2024	February 16, 2025	
33	DF	(United States) Jyllissa Harris	(Canada) Ottawa Rapid FC	March 10, 2025	December 31, 2025	
16	FW	(Canada) Amanda West	(Canada) AFC Toronto	April 4, 2025	August 18, 2025	
29	DF	(Brazil) Rebeca	(Spain) Dux Logroño	August 19, 2025	June 30, 2025	
5	DF	(United States) Zoe Matthews	(Spain) Dux Logroño	August 20, 2025	June 30, 2025	

=== New contracts ===
Date	Pos.	No.	Player	Contract until	Ref.
December 5, 2024	DF	30	(United States) Avery Patterson	2027	
December 6, 2024	MF	12	(Jamaica) Kiki Van Zanten	2026 + 1 mutual year	
December 10, 2024	DF	33	(United States) Jylissa Harris	2027 + 1 mutual year	
December 10, 2024	DF	2	(Canada) Allysha Chapman	2026 + 1 mutual year	
December 10, 2024	FW	16	(Canada) Amanda West	2026 + 1 mutual year	
December 10, 2024	MF	13	(Canada) Sophie Schmidt	Exercised mutual option through 2025	
December 10, 2024	GK	18	(United States) Heather Hinz	Exercised unilateral option through 2025	
December 10, 2024	FW	11	(United States) Michelle Alozie	Contract Renewal	
December 10, 2024	DF	4	(United States) Natalie Jacobs	Contract Renewal	
December 10, 2024	DF	7	(United States) Paige Nielsen	Contract Renewal	
December 10, 2024	MF	15	(Venezuela) Bárbara Olivieri	Contract Renewal	
December 10, 2024	MF	17	(Austria) Sarah Puntigam	Contract Renewal	
December 18, 2024	MF	19	(United States) Belle Briede	2025	
December 18, 2024	DF	20	(United States) Christen Westphal	2026 + 1 mutual year	
June 4, 2025	FW	6	(United States) Messiah Bright	2026 + 1 mutual year	
June 30, 2025	GK	3	(United States) Liz Beardsley	2027 + 1 mutual year	

== Staff ==
As of 4 June 2025

Role	Name
President	(United States) Jessica O'Neill
President of Women's soccer	(United States) Angela Hucles Mangano
Head coach	(United States) Fabrice Gautrat
Assistant coach	(United States) Ricky Clarke
Assistant coach	(United States) Jaime Frias
Goalkeeping coach	(United States) Eric Klenofsky
Assistant goalkeeping coach	(United States) Megan Kinneman
Assistant coach Video analyst	(United States) Hiro Suzuki
Technical Director	(Sweden) Pablo Piñones Arce
Equipment manager	(United States) Paloma Paez

== Non-competitive fixtures ==
=== Preseason ===
Win	Draw	Loss

Date	Opponent	Venue	Location	Result (Note: Houston Dash score written first)	Scorers
February 16	San Diego Wave FC	Coachella Valley Invitational	Indio, California	0–0	
February 22	Portland Thorns FC	Coachella Valley Invitational	Indio, California	3–2	Gareis X 2 Bright

=== Midseason ===
Date	Opponent	Venue	Location	Result (Note: Houston Dash score written first)	Scorers
July 8	Monterrey	Shell Energy Stadium	Houston, Texas	4–0	Sheehan 24'; Patterson; Graham 73'; Van Zanten 87'
July 20	Carolina Ascent FC	Shell Energy Stadium	Houston, Texas	2–0	Sheehan 30'; Jacobs 76'

== Competitive fixtures ==
=== 2025 National Women's Soccer League season ===
==== Regular-season standings ====
Pos	Team	Pld	W	D	L	GF	GA	GD	Pts	Qualification
8	Gotham FC (C)	26	9	9	8	35	25	+10	36	Playoffs and CONCACAF W Champions Cup
9	North Carolina Courage	26	9	8	9	37	39	−2	35	
10	Houston Dash	26	8	6	12	27	39	−12	30	
11	Angel City FC	26	7	6	13	31	41	−10	27	
12	Utah Royals	26	6	7	13	28	42	−14	25	

Source: NWSL
Rules for classification: 1) points; 2) total goal difference; 3) total wins; 4) total goals scored; 5) head-to-head points; 6) head-to-head goals scored; 7) fewest disciplinary points; 8) coin toss (if 2 clubs tied) or drawing of lots (if ≥3 clubs tied).
(C) Champions

==== Results summary ====
Overall								Home						Away					
Pld	W	D	L	GF	GA	GD	Pts	W	D	L	GF	GA	GD	W	D	L	GF	GA	GD
26	8	6	12	27	41	−14	30	4	4	5	15	19	−4	4	2	7	12	22	−10

Last updated: November 2, 2025.
Source: NWSLsoccer.com

Matchday	1	2	3	4	5	6	7	8	9	10	11	12	13	14	15	16	17	18	19	20	21	22	23	24	25	26
Stadium	H	A	H	H	A	H	H	A	H	H	A	H	A	A	H	A	H	A	A	A	H	A	H	A	H	A
Result	L	W	D	L	L	W	L	W	L	D	L	L	L	D	W	W	D	D	W	L	W	L	D	L	W	L
Position	13	6	6	10	10	10	12	12	12	12	12	12	12	12	12	10	11	11	9	10	9	10	10	10	10	10

Updated to match(es) played on November 2, 2025. Source: NWSL
A = Away; H = Home; W = Win; D = Draw; L = Loss

==== Legend ====
Win	Draw	Loss	Postponed

=== League ===
Win	Draw	Loss

Matchday	Date	Opponent	Venue	Location	Result (Note: Houston Dash score written first)	Scorers	Attendance	Referee	Position
1	March 14	Washington Spirit	Shell Energy Stadium	Houston, Texas	1–2	Graham 74'		Matthew Thompson	13th
2	March 23	Chicago Stars FC	SeatGeek Stadium	Bridgeview, Illinois	2–1	Nielsen 20'; Graham 64'	3,376	Iryna Petrunok	6th
3	March 28	NJ/NY Gotham FC	Shell Energy Stadium	Houston, Texas	0–0			Shawn Tehini	6th
4	April 12	Angel City FC	Shell Energy Stadium	Houston, Texas	1–3	Olivieri 61'		Jaclyn Metz	10th
5	April 19	Kansas City Current	CPKC Stadium	Kansas City, Missouri	0–2		11,500	Ekaterina Koroleva	10th
6	April 25	Utah Royals FC	Shell Energy Stadium	Houston, Texas	1–0	Sheehan 80'	5,084	Adorae Monroy	10th
7	May 2	Racing Louisville FC	Shell Energy Stadium	Houston, Texas	1–2	Patterson 8'	5,765	Marie Durr	12th
8	May 11	Seattle Reign	Lumen Field	Seattle, Washington	0–1	Graham 57'		Alyssa Nichols	12th
9	May 16	Portland Thorns	Shell Energy Stadium	Houston, Texas	1–4	Own goal	6,217	Shawn Tehini	12th
10	May 24	Bay FC	Shell Energy Stadium	Houston, Texas	2–2	Patterson 33'; Bright 88'	5,595	Alexandra Billeter	12th
11	June 7	Orlando Pride	Inter&Co Stadium	Orlando, Florida	0–1		9,766	Benjamin Meyer	12th
12	June 13	San Diego Wave FC	Shell Energy Stadium	Houston, Texas	2–3	Olivieri 61'; Ryan 68'	6,241	Greg Dopka	12th
13	June 21	North Carolina Courage	WakeMed Soccer Park	Cary, North Carolina	1–2	Patterson 1'	6,624	Calin Radosav	12th
14	August 2	Bay FC	PayPal Park	San Jose, California	2–2	Van Zanten 72'; Schmidt 80'	15,002		12th
15	August 8	North Carolina Courage	Shell Energy Stadium	Houston, Texas	2–1	Van Zanten 39'; Schmidt 90+5'	5,409	Shawn Tehini	12th
16	August 17	NJ/NY Gotham FC	Sports Illustrated Stadium	Harrison, New Jersey	2–1	Sonnett 51' (OG); Alozie 90+3'	7,519	Elijio Arreguin	10th
17	August 24	Seattle Reign	Shell Energy Stadium	Houston, Texas	1–1	Ryan 47'	5,481	Iryna Petrunok	11th
18	August 29	Racing Louisville FC	Lynn Family Stadium	Louisville, Kentucky	1–1	Duljan 90+1'	6,095	Matthew Rodman	11th
19	September 7	San Diego Wave FC	Snapdragon Stadium	San Diego, California	3–0	Larisey 17'; Ryan 45'; Bright 77'	15,626	Thomas Snyder	9th
20	September 14	Utah Royals FC	America First Field	Sandy, Utah	0–2			Marie Durr	10th
21	September 19	Chicago Stars FC	Shell Energy Stadium	Houston, Texas	1–0		Ryan 28'	Abdou Ndiaye	9th
22	September 28	Washington Spirit	Audi Field	Washington D.C.	0–4		12,715	Alexandra Billeter	10th
23	October 3	Orlando Pride	Shell Energy Stadium	Houston, Texas	1–1	Berkely 62'	6,406	John Griggs	10th
24	October 12	Angel City FC	BMO Stadium	Los Angeles, California	0–2			Matthew Corrigan	10th
25	October 18	Kansas City Current	Shell Energy Stadium	Houston, Texas	1–0	Gareis 69'	8,436	Iryna Petrunok	10th
26	November 2	Portland Thorns	Providence Park	Portland, Oregon	0–2			Matthew Thompson	10th

== Awards and honors ==
=== Rookie of the Month ===
Month	Player	Ref.
March	(United States) Maggie Graham	

=== End-of-season awards ===
Award	Winner	Ref
Most Valuable Player	(United States) Avery Patterson	
Players’ Player of the Year	(United States) Katie Lind	
Golden Boot	(Mexico) Yazmeen Ryan	
Defender of the Year	(United States) Paige Nielsen	
Newcomer of the Year	(United States) Yazmeen Ryan	
Young Player of the Year	(Venezuela) Maggie Graham	

== See also ==
- 2025 National Women's Soccer League season
- 2025 in American soccer
