= Itzel González =

Mexican footballer (born 1994)

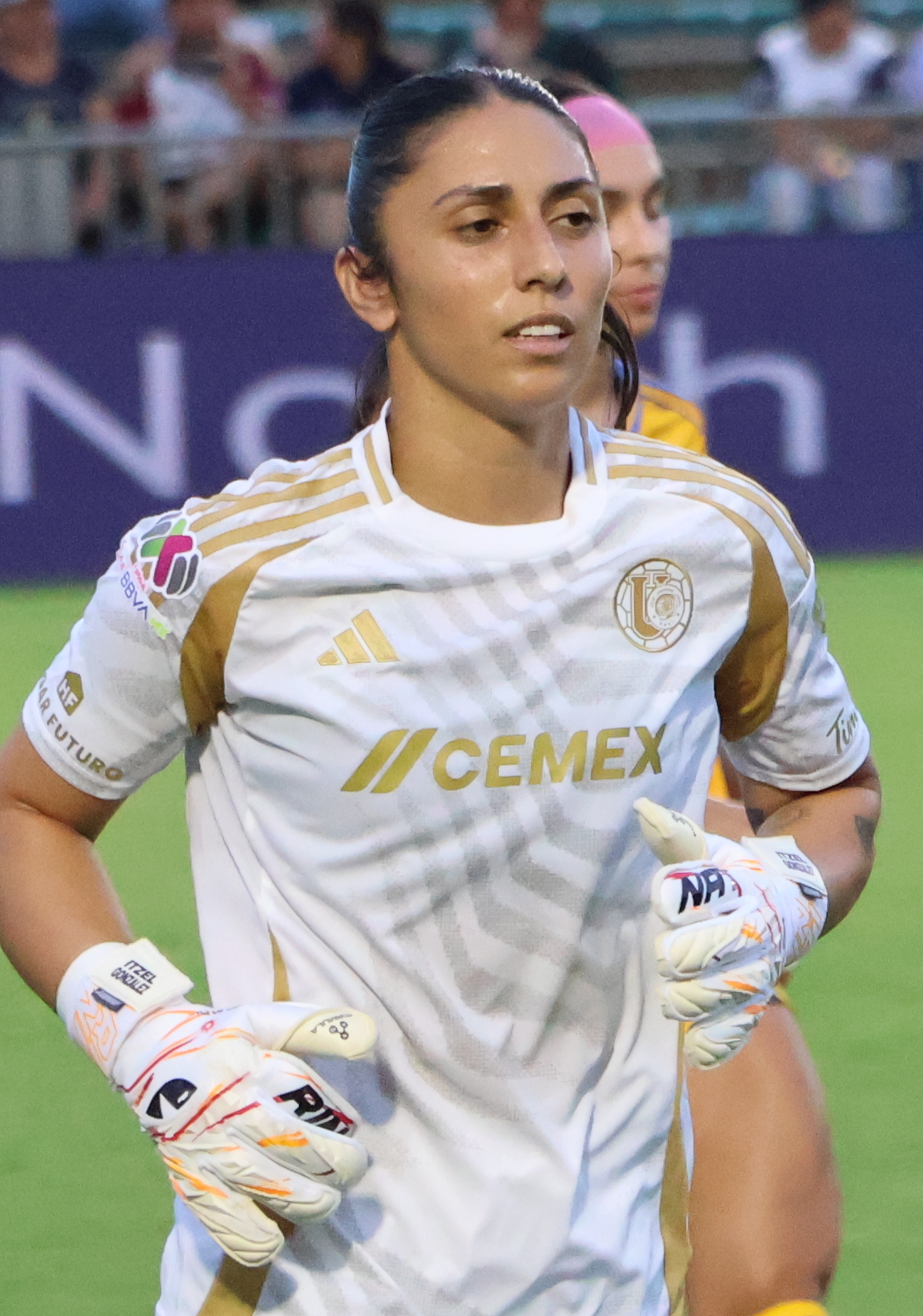
- González with Tigres UANL in 2025

Personal information
- Full name: Itzel González Rodríguez
- Date of birth: 14 August 1994 (age 32)
- Place of birth: Tijuana, Baja California, Mexico
- Height: 1.65 m (5 ft 5 in)
- Position: Goalkeeper

Team information
- Current team: UANL
- Number: 23

College career
Years	Team	Apps	(Gls)
2012–2016	UC San Diego Tritons	28	(0)

Senior career*
Years	Team	Apps	(Gls)
2017–2022	Tijuana	129	(0)
2022	→ Sevilla (loan)	0	(0)
2022–2024	América	49	(0)
2024–	UANL	20	(0)

International career^{‡}
2011–2012	Mexico U20		
2019–	Mexico	20	(0)
Medal record
Women's football
Representing Mexico
Central American and Caribbean Games
Gold medal – first place	2023 San Salvador
- * Club domestic league appearances and goals as of 1 September 2025 ‡ National team caps and goals as of 19 February 2025

Itzel González Rodríguez (born 14 August 1994) is a Mexican professional footballer who plays as a goalkeeper for Liga MX Femenil club Tigres UANL and the Mexico national team.

== College career ==
González played college soccer for the UC San Diego Tritons between 2012 and 2016, redshirting in 2015.

== Club career ==
On 24 May 2025, González made several key saves for Tigres in the 2025 CONCACAF W Champions Cup final against Gotham FC. She stopped two penalty kicks during regulation but could not deny Esther on the rebound of the second penalty as Tigres lost 1–0.

== International career ==
González was a non-playing squad member for the Mexico women's national under-20 football team at the 2012 FIFA U-20 Women's World Cup.

González made her debut for the senior Mexico women's national team on 15 December 2019, in a 4–0 friendly defeat by Brazil at Estadio Fonte Luminosa in Araraquara.

== Honours ==
=== Club ===
Club América

- Liga MX Femenil: Clausura 2023
