= Kayla Duran =

American soccer player (born 1999)

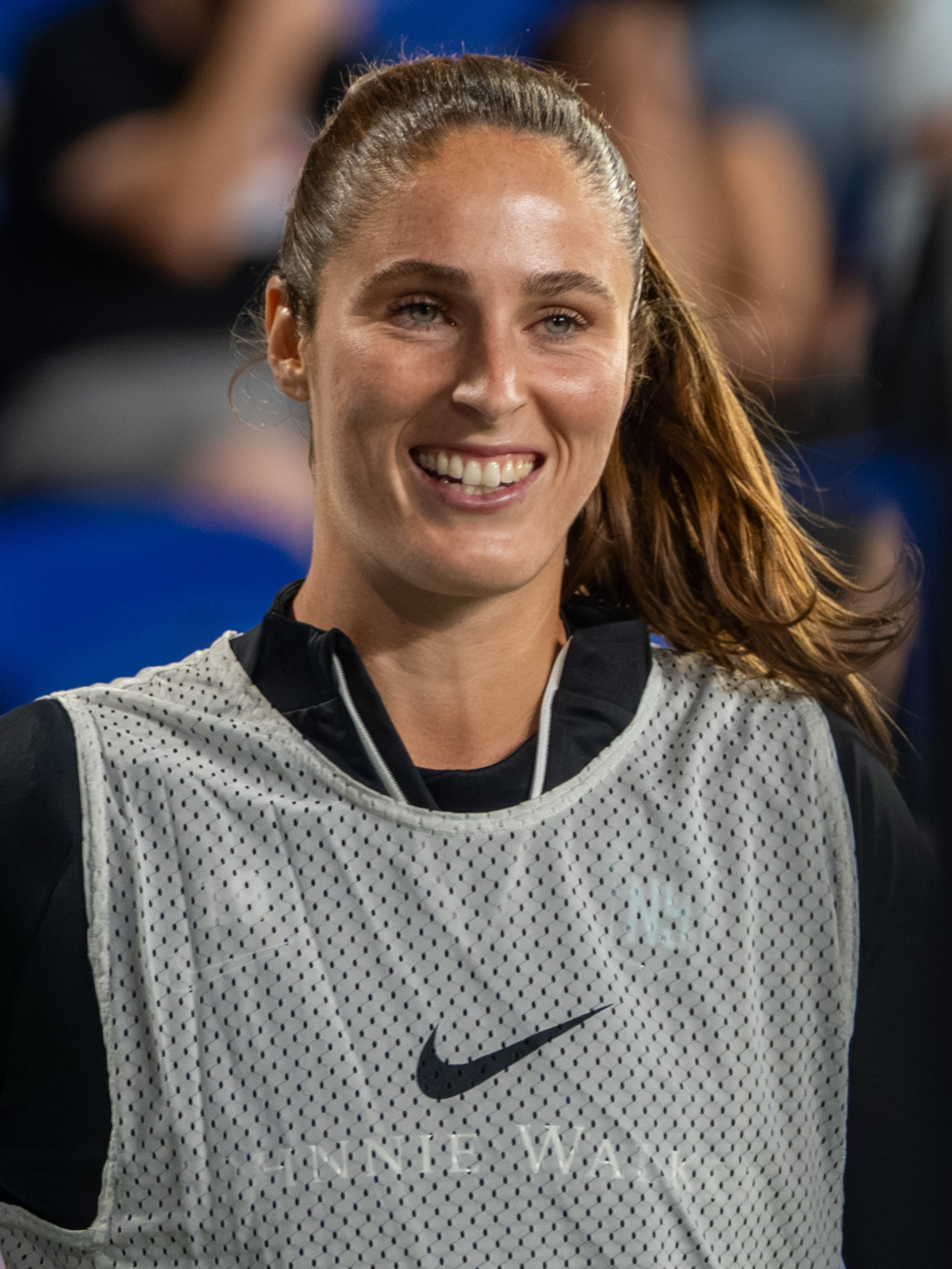
- Duran with Gotham FC in 2025

Personal information
- Full name: Kayla Jennifer Duran
- Date of birth: September 29, 1999 (age 27)
- Height: 5 ft 10 in (1.78 m)
- Position: Defender

Team information
- Current team: Gotham FC
- Number: 19

Youth career
- FC Stars

College career
Years	Team	Apps	(Gls)
2018–2019	Boston College Eagles	20	(1)
2020–2022	Brown Bears	33	(2)
2023	USC Trojans	19	(1)

Senior career*
Years	Team	Apps	(Gls)
2025–	Gotham FC	12	(0)
- * Club domestic league appearances and goals as of November 1, 2026

Kayla Jennifer Duran (born September 29, 1999) is an American professional soccer player who plays as a defender for Gotham FC of the National Women's Soccer League (NWSL). She played college soccer for the Boston College Eagles, Brown Bears, and USC Trojans.

== Early life ==
A native of Woburn, Massachusetts, Duran played soccer for local club FC Stars. She contributed to two ECNL final four appearances and also won the 2018 Massachusetts Gatorade Player of the Year award. Duran was a dual-sport athlete at Buckingham Browne & Nichols School, participating in both soccer and ice hockey. With the soccer team, she totaled 63 goals and 44 assists across all 3 positional lines. She helped Buckingham Browne & Nichols win one league championship. She also received individual honors, landing a spot on the 2017 High School All-American East team and bagging one League MVP title.

== College career ==
=== Boston College Eagles ===
Duran kicked off her college career with the Boston College Eagles. She started all 20 games of her freshman year and was named to the 2018 ACC All-Freshman team. She recorded 1827 minutes of play, reaching a single-game personal record of 110 minutes against Miami on October 13. She scored her first college goal on September 20, 2018, picking off a rebound to help Boston College beat Syracuse, 3–0. However, Duran picked up a season-ending injury in the build-up to her sophomore year. She was forced to miss the entire season and never appeared for the Eagles again.

=== Brown Bears ===
Duran transferred to Brown University in 2020, partially due to the school's open curriculum education program. Her return to the field was later pushed back another year, as the COVID-19 pandemic caused the Ivy League to cancel the 2020 athletic season. During their time off the field, Duran and the Bears worked hard to prepare for the 2021 campaign. Their efforts proved to be successful, as Brown won their second Ivy League title in a row upon returning to the pitch. Duran, who was originally brought in as a midfielder, spent the majority of her time at Brown playing as a center back. Her positional move paid off, as she was named the Ivy League defensive player of the year and was named first-team All-Ivy and All-Region. She also scored a goal for Brown on October 9, 2021, heading in a Sheyenne Allen corner kick to beat Princeton by a 3–1 scoreline.

In her second year at Brown, Duran was named one of three team captains. She led the team to their third consecutive Ivy League title and played in every match of the year. She was also named to the All-American third team and maintained her spot on the All-Ivy and All-Region first teams. In her two active seasons of play with Brown, Duran started every single available match.

=== USC Trojans ===
In 2023, Duran entered the NCAA transfer portal for the second time. She went on to play one year with the USC Trojans as a graduate student. She started all 17 of the Trojans' Pac-12 games and synergized with USC's defensive unit to post 9 shutouts. She also participated in both of the team's NCAA tournament games as they were eliminated in the second round by BYU. On November 3, 2023, Duran scored her only goal with USC and also tallied an assist as rivals UCLA beat the Trojans, 4–2. At the end of the season, Duran was named to the All Pac-12 first team.

== Club career ==
After her final year playing collegiately for the Trojans, Duran recovered from a concussion as she completed her master's program at USC. Following her graduation in December 2024, Duran began working full-time as an analyst in the property and casualty insurance sector and stepped away from high-level competition. She occasionally played in local men’s leagues and realized how much she missed the sport. In spring 2025, Duran received an invitation from former United States women’s national team goalkeeper Hope Solo to play for Solo FC in The Soccer Tournament, a seven-a-side competition. Following this experience, she reconnected with coaches and pursued professional opportunities, ultimately securing representation from an agent. Duran subsequently received an invitation to train with Gotham FC in the summer of 2025.

Duran signed her first professional deal, a national team replacement contract, with Gotham FC on July 14, 2025. On August 8, she extended her contract with Gotham through February 2026. Duran made her professional debut the very next day, coming in as a substitute for Jess Carter in a scoreless draw with the Washington Spirit. As the season went on, Duran found success in Gotham's CONCACAF W Champions Cup games; she recorded her first career start in August 2025 against Monterrey, her first professional goal on September 2 versus Alianza, and her first assist later the same month against the Vancouver Rise Academy. In Gotham's NWSL quarterfinal victory over the shield-winning Kansas City Current, Duran contributed a header that led to Katie Stengel's game-winning goal. Gotham would go on to win the NWSL championship, beating the Washington Spirit on a goal from Rose Lavelle.

Duran's first appearance of 2026 came in Gotham's FIFA Women's Champions Cup third place match against AS FAR on January 1; she started and played the entirety of the 4–0 win. In February 2026, she extended her contract with Gotham through the 2027 season. Two months later, Duran picked up a season-ending ACL injury in a match against the Kansas City Current, sidelining her for the remainder of the year.

== International career ==
As a high school sophomore, Duran received a call-up to the United States national under-17 team.

== Personal life ==
Duran's brother, Riley Duran, is a professional ice hockey player who was selected by the Boston Bruins in the 2020 NHL entry draft. Both of Duran's parents were former collegiate athletes; her father played ice hockey for the SUNY Plattsburgh Cardinals while her mother played soccer, softball, and basketball for the Utica Pioneers.

Duran continues to maintain her full-time career as a data analyst alongside her soccer career in the NWSL.

== Career statistics ==
=== Club ===
As of March 18, 2026

Appearances and goals by club, season and competition
Club	Season	League			Cup (Note: Includes NWSL playoffs)		Playoffs (Note: Includes the CONCACAF W Champions Cup)		Continental		Total	
Club	Season	Division	Apps	Goals	Apps	Goals	Apps	Goals	Apps	Goals	Apps	Goals
Gotham FC	2025	NWSL	7	0	—		2	0	4	1	13	1
Gotham FC	2026	NWSL	3	0	—		—		1	0	4	0
Career total			10	0	0	0	2	0	5	1	17	1

== Honors ==
Gotham FC

- NWSL Championship: 2025
- NWSL Shield: 2026
- NWSL Challenge Cup: 2026
