= Lilly Reale =

American soccer player (born 2003)

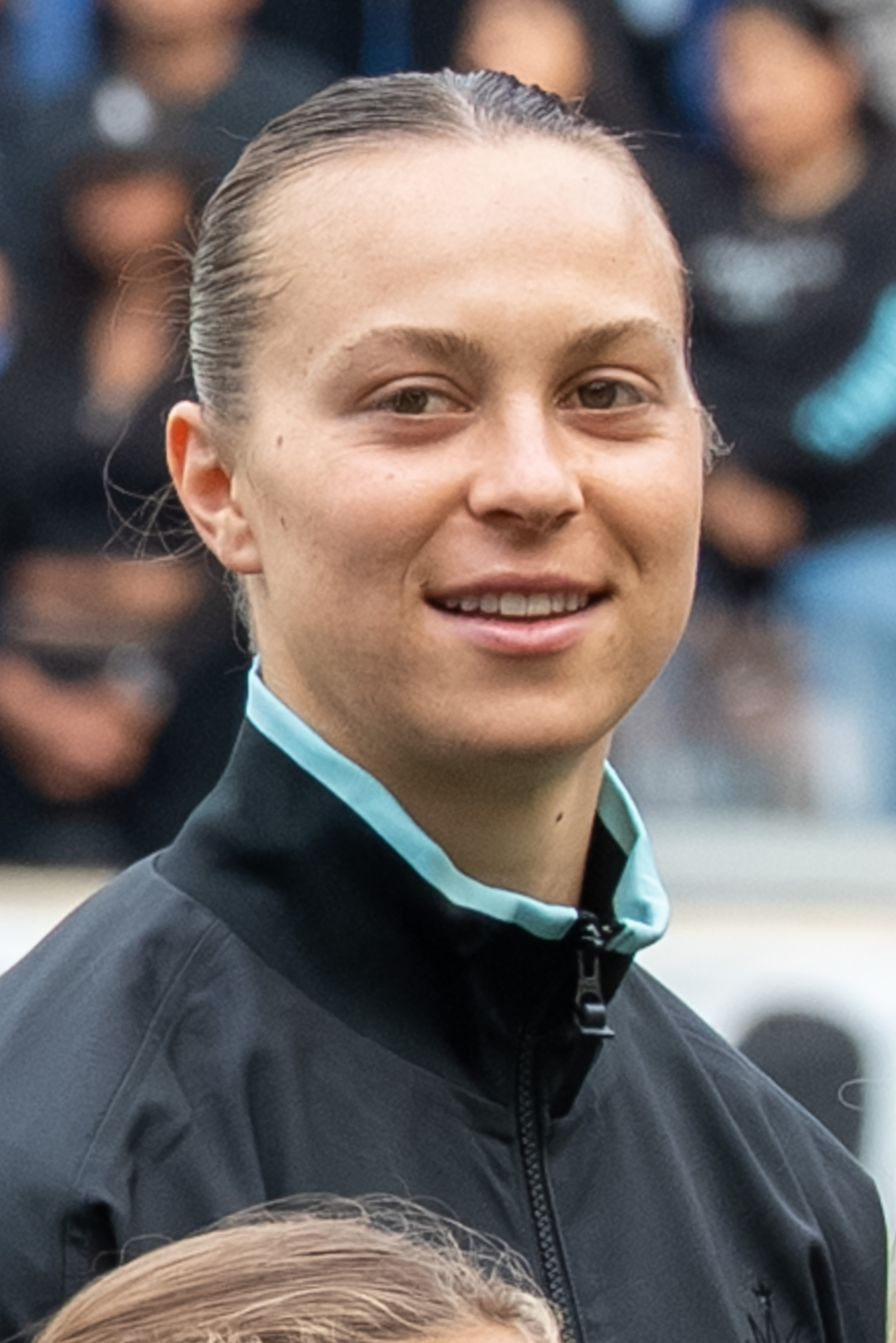
- Reale with Gotham FC in 2025

Personal information
- Full name: Lilly Ann Reale
- Date of birth: August 12, 2003 (age 23)
- Place of birth: Boston, Massachusetts, U.S.
- Height: 5 ft 9 in (1.75 m)
- Positions: Left back; center back

Team information
- Current team: Boston Legacy
- Number: 2

Youth career
- South Shore Select

College career
Years	Team	Apps	(Gls)
2021–2024	UCLA Bruins	83	(3)

Senior career*
Years	Team	Apps	(Gls)
2025–2026	Gotham FC	35	(1)
2026–	Boston Legacy	16	(0)

International career^{‡}
2019	United States U-17	3	(0)
2022	United States U-20	9	(1)
2023–	United States U-23	3	(1)
2025–	United States	9	(0)
- * Club domestic league appearances and goals as of 02:16, November 8, 2026 (UTC) ‡ National team caps and goals as of April 17, 2026

Lilly Ann Reale (born August 12, 2003) is an American professional soccer player who plays as a defender for Boston Legacy FC of the National Women's Soccer League (NWSL) and the United States national team.

Reale played college soccer for the UCLA Bruins, earning All-American honors three times and winning the national championship in 2022. She was also named the Pac-12 or Big Ten Defender of the Year three times. She started her professional career with Gotham FC in 2025, winning the NWSL Championship in her debut season and being named NWSL Rookie of the Year.

Reale represented the United States at the youth international level, appearing at the 2022 FIFA U-20 Women's World Cup, before making her senior debut and being named the U.S. Soccer Young Female Player of the Year in 2025.

== Early life ==
Reale was born in Boston, Massachusetts, to Melissa and Jeff Reale, and has two younger siblings. Reale was raised in Hingham and started playing soccer at three or four. She played club soccer for South Shore Select alongside Ally Sentnor. She played both forward and center back at Hingham High School, scoring 15 goals as a freshman and 21 as a sophomore before dedicating herself to defense. She initially committed to play college soccer at Boston College, but after its head coach left, she changed her commitment to the University of California, Los Angeles (UCLA). Her sister, Sophie, played with her at UCLA for one season before transferring to Boston College.

== College career ==
Reale was a four-year starter for the UCLA Bruins, making 83 appearances. In her freshman season in 2021, she contributed to the team posting an eight-game shutout streak during the regular season. She received All-Pac-12 Conference first-team and TopDrawerSoccer Freshman Best XI honors. UCLA went undefeated to win the Pac-12 conference title but were upset in the first round of the NCAA tournament. In her sophomore season in 2022, Reale was named the Pac-12 Defender of the Year and second-team All-American by United Soccer Coaches. In the 2022 national title game, UCLA went down 2–0 to North Carolina but recovered late to win 3–2 in overtime. Reale played every minute of the NCAA tournament and was named its Most Outstanding Defensive Player. After the season, she was awarded the Honda Sports Award as the best player in college soccer.

Reale led the Bruins to her second Pac-12 championship in her junior season in 2023. She was named first-team All-American and became the only player to win consecutive Pac-12 Defender of the Year awards (and second to win twice overall after Naomi Girma). With the program's move to the Big Ten Conference in her senior season in 2024, Reale helped UCLA win the Big Ten tournament without conceding in three tournament games. She was named the Big Ten Defender of the Year, first-team All-Big Ten, and first-team All-American.

== Club career ==
=== Gotham FC ===
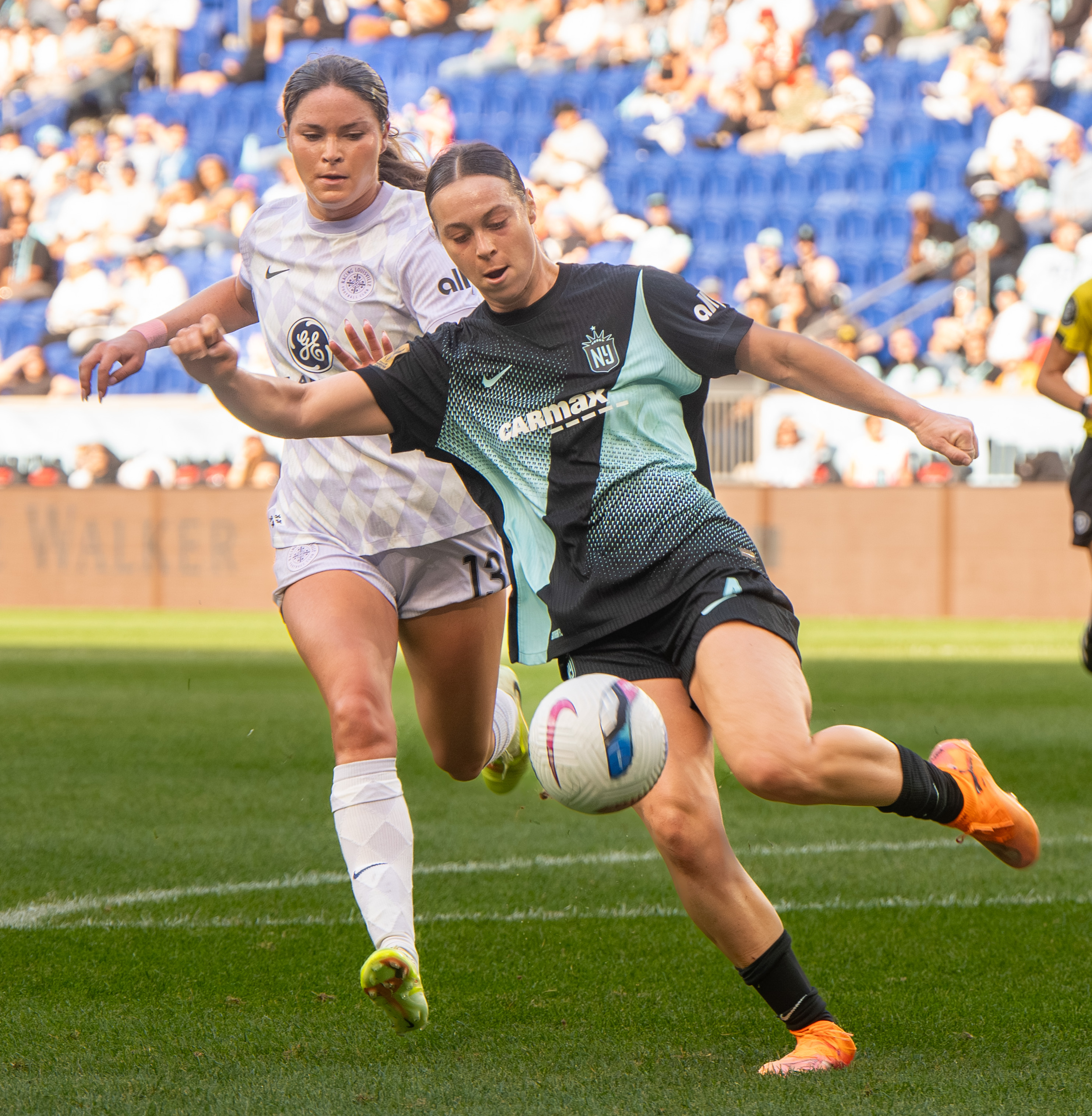
Reale playing for Gotham in 2025

Gotham FC announced on January 3, 2025, that they had signed Reale to her first professional contract on a three-year deal. Previously a center back in college, she was moved to left back by head coach Juan Carlos Amorós. She made her professional debut on March 15 as a substitute after Mandy Freeman was ejected late on the opening matchday against the Seattle Reign. The following week, she scored an own goal two minutes into her first professional start, a 2–0 defeat to the Orlando Pride. Despite the error, Amorós said she "was outstanding" over the rest of the game. She scored her first professional goal for Gotham on April 13, heading in the third in a 3–1 win over the North Carolina Courage. On May 25, she started in the 2025 CONCACAF W Champions Cup final against Tigres and played the entire match as Gotham won 1–0 to become the inaugural winners of the competition.

Reale played in all 26 league games, starting 21, as Gotham placed eighth in the standings. She had one goal and logged over 1,900 minutes in the regular season, with only Emily Sonnett playing more for the team as a defender. In the playoffs, she started all three games as Gotham defeated the NWSL Shield winners Kansas City Current in the quarterfinals, defending champions Orlando Pride in the semifinals, and the Washington Spirit in the final. In the championship game, she was booked while containing Rosemonde Kouassi and substituted out after 63 minutes as Gotham won 1–0 on a goal from Rose Lavelle. She was named the NWSL Rookie of the Year and included in the NWSL Best XI Second Team at the end of the season.

Reale began her second season with Gotham at the inaugural FIFA Women's Champions Cup. After losing 1–0 to Corinthians in the semifinals, she assisted the opening goal against AS FAR in the 4–0 win for third place at the Emirates Stadium. On March 14, 2026, she made a homecoming to Massachusetts as Gotham began the NWSL season against expansion team Boston Legacy. She played the full match in a 1–0 victory at Gillette Stadium.

=== Boston Legacy ===
On June 17, 2026, Reale was traded to the Boston Legacy in exchange for US$350,000 in allocation funds and US$50,000 in intraleague transfer funds, signing a four-year contract with her hometown club through 2029.

== International career ==
Reale was first called into training camp with the United States national under-15 team in 2017. She played international friendly matches for the under-15 and under-16 teams in 2018 and the under-17 team the following year. While in college, Reale started for the under-20s at the 2022 CONCACAF Women's U-20 Championship, winning the tournament. She competed with the team at the 2022 FIFA U-20 Women's World Cup, where they did not advance out of the group stage. She played friendlies for the under-23 team in 2023. She was called up by Emma Hayes into Futures Camp, practicing concurrently with the senior national team, in January 2025. In May 2025, Reale was called up to the under-23 team for two friendlies against Germany, scoring in the first game.

Hayes gave Reale her first senior national team call-up in June 2025. She made her senior debut in the June 26 friendly against the Republic of Ireland, playing the full match and assisting Alyssa Thompson in the 4–0 win. She was named the U.S. Soccer Young Female Player of the Year following her early senior caps and her rookie season with Gotham FC.

== Career statistics ==
As of June 17, 2026 (upon transfer to Boston)

Appearances and goals by club, season and competition
Club	Season	League			Playoffs		Continental (Note: Includes the CONCACAF W Champions Cup)		Total	
Club	Season	Division	Apps	Goals	Apps	Goals	Apps	Goals	Apps	Goals
Gotham FC	2025	NWSL	26	1	3	0	2	0	31	1
Boston Legacy FC	2026	NWSL	9	1	0	0	4	0	13	1
Career total			35	2	3	0	6	0	44	2

=== International ===
As of match played April 17, 2026

National Team	Year	Apps	Goals
United States	2025	6	0
United States	2026	3	0
Total		9	0

== Honors and awards ==
UCLA Bruins

- NCAA Division I women's soccer tournament: 2022
- Pac-12 Conference: 2021, 2023
- Big Ten women's soccer tournament: 2024

Gotham FC

- NWSL Championship: 2025
- CONCACAF W Champions Cup: 2024–25

United States U-20

- CONCACAF Women's U-20 Championship: 2022

United States

- SheBelieves Cup: 2026

Individual

- U.S. Soccer Young Female Player of the Year: 2025
- NWSL Rookie of the Year: 2025
- NWSL Best XI Second Team: 2025
- First-team All-American: 2023, 2024
- Second-team All-American: 2022
- Pac-12 Defender of the Year: 2022, 2023
- Big Ten Defender of the Year: 2024
- First-team All-Pac-12: 2021, 2022, 2023
- First-team All-Big Ten: 2024
- NCAA Division I Women's Soccer Tournament Most Outstanding Player: 2022
