= Pac-12 Conference women's soccer awards =

The Pac-12 Conference (previously the Pac-10 Conference) presented several annual honors for the best women's soccer players of the season. Individual awards included Player of the Year (1995–2016), Forward of the Year, Midfielder of the Year, Defender of the Year, Goalkeeper of the Year, and Freshman of the Year. The conference also presented an award for Coach of the Year.

== Key ==
| * | Awarded a national player of the year award: Hermann Trophy (1988–present); Honda Sports Award (1988–present); TopDrawerSoccer National Player of the Year (2011–present); Soccer America Player of the Year (1985–2014) |

== Player of the Year ==
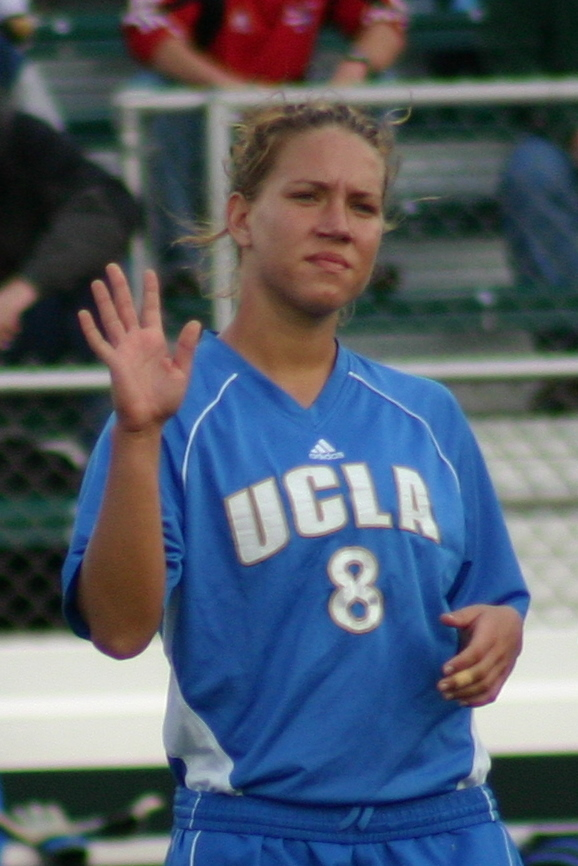
Lauren Cheney, UCLA, 2007

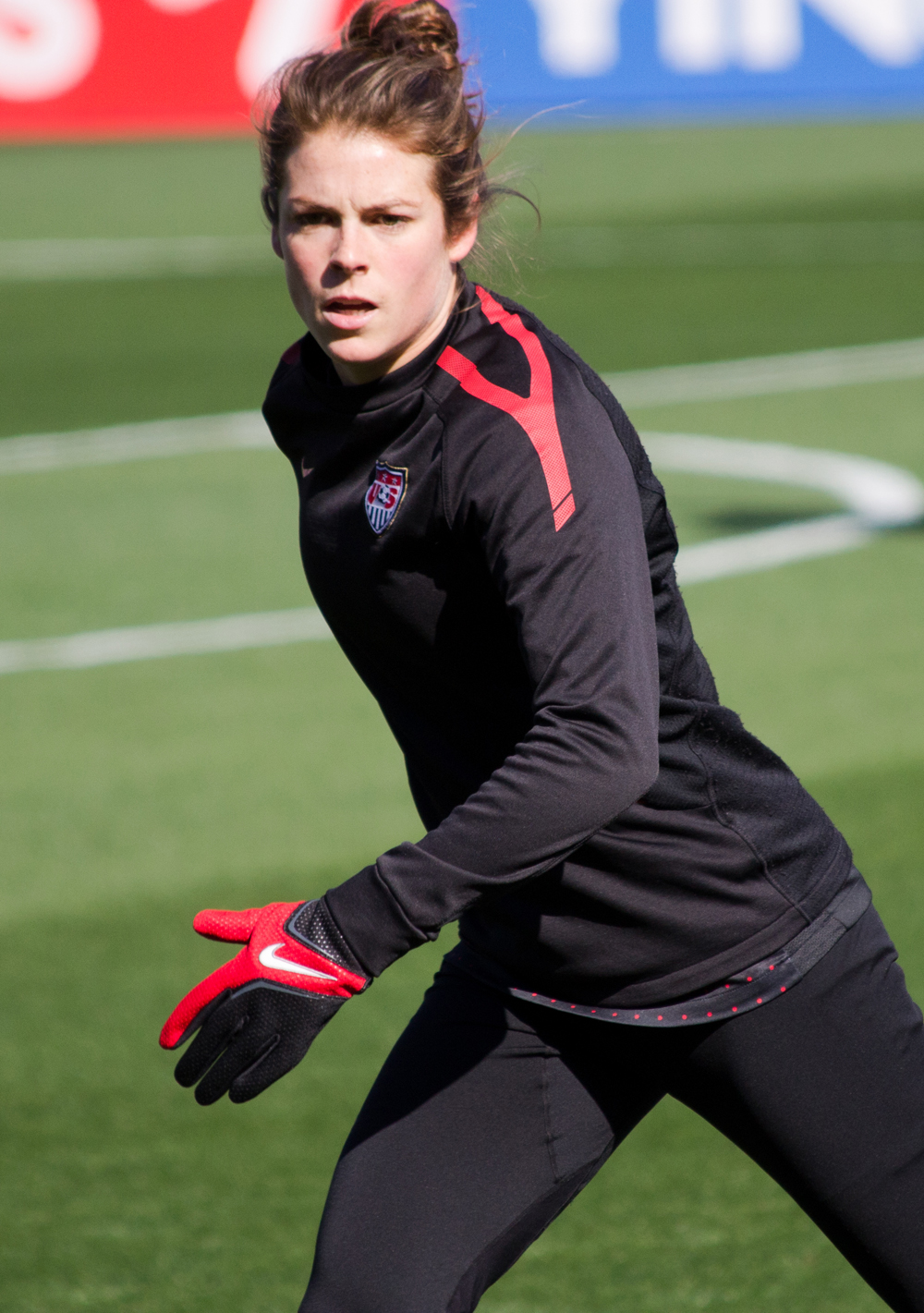
Kelley O'Hara, Stanford, 2009

Pac-12 Conference Player of the Year
| Season | Player | School | Position | Class | Ref. |
|---|---|---|---|---|---|
| 1995 | Carmel Murphy | Stanford | Midfielder | Senior | |
| 1996 | Erin Martin | Stanford | Forward | Senior | |
| 1997 | Traci Arkenberg | UCLA | Forward | Senior | |
| 1998 | Tracye Lawyer | Stanford | Midfielder | Senior | |
| 1998 | Isabelle Harvey | USC | Midfielder/forward | Sophomore | |
| 1999 | Stacey Tullock | Arizona State | Midfielder | Sophomore | |
| 2000 | Tracey Milburn | UCLA | Forward | Senior | |
| 2001 | Hope Solo | Washington | Goalkeeper | Junior | |
| 2002 | Marcia Wallis | Stanford | Midfielder/forward | Senior | |
| 2003 | Tina Frimpong | Washington | Forward | Junior | |
| 2003 | Nandi Pryce | UCLA | Defender | Senior | |
| 2004 | Tina Frimpong (2) | Washington | Forward | Senior | |
| 2005 | Mallory Miller | Arizona | Midfielder/forward | Senior | |
| 2006 | Nicole Garbin | Oregon | Forward | Sixth-year senior | |
| 2007 | Lauren Cheney * | UCLA | Forward | Sophomore | |
| 2008 | Christina DiMartino | UCLA | Midfielder | Senior | |
| 2009 | Kelley O'Hara * | Stanford | Forward | Senior | |
| 2010 | Christen Press * | Stanford | Forward | Senior | |
| 2011 | Lindsay Taylor * | Stanford | Forward | Senior | |
| 2012 | Zakiya Bywaters | UCLA | Midfielder/forward | Senior | |
| 2013 | Micaela Castain | Washington State | Forward | Senior | |
| 2014 | Sam Mewis * | UCLA | Midfielder | Senior | |
| 2015 | Arielle Ship | California | Forward | Junior | |
| 2016 | Andi Sullivan | Stanford | Midfielder | Junior | |

== Forward of the Year ==
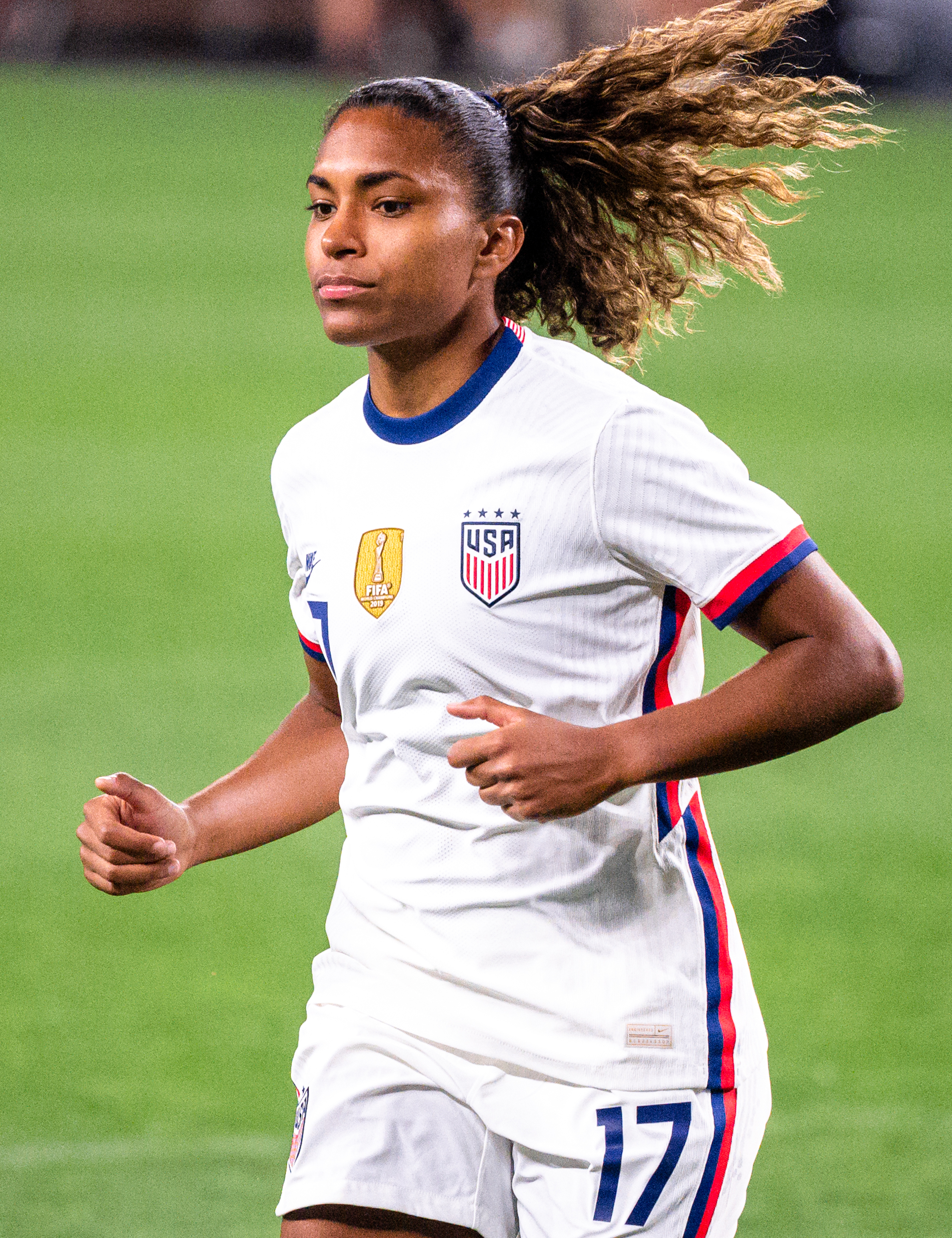
Catarina Macario, Stanford, 2× Pac-12 Forward of the Year and 1× Pac-12 Midfielder of the Year

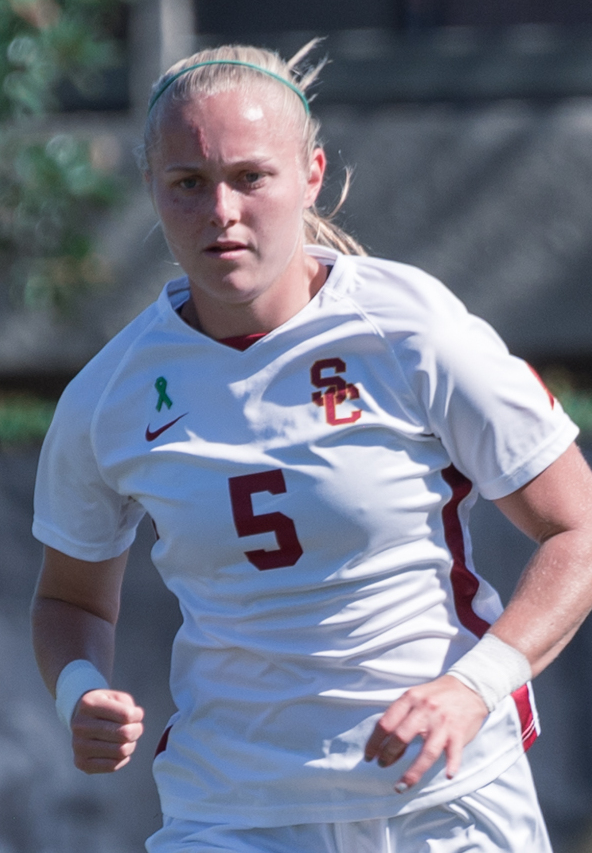
Penelope Hocking, USC, 2× Pac-12 Forward of the Year

Pac-12 Conference Forward of the Year
| Season | Player | School | Class | Ref. |
|---|---|---|---|---|
| 2017 | Catarina Macario | Stanford | Freshman | |
| 2018 | Catarina Macario (2) * | Stanford | Sophomore | |
| 2019 | Tara McKeown | USC | Junior | |
| 2020 | Penelope Hocking | USC | Junior | |
| 2021 | Penelope Hocking (2) | USC | Senior | |
| 2022 | Nicole Douglas | Arizona State | Graduate | |
| 2023 | Reilyn Turner | UCLA | Senior | |

== Midfielder of the Year ==
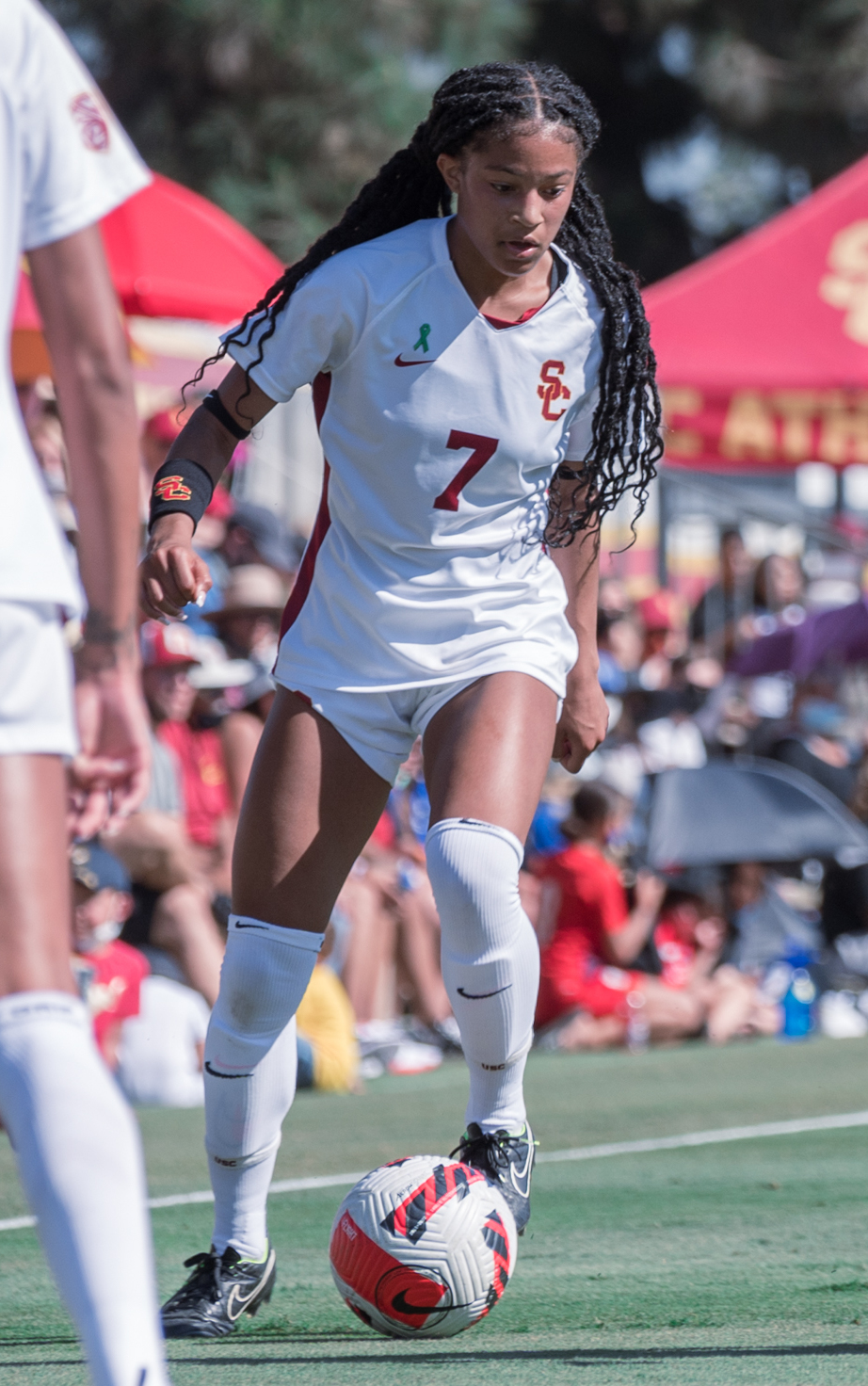
Croix Bethune, USC, 2× Pac-12 Midfielder of the Year

Pac-12 Conference Midfielder of the Year
| Season | Player | School | Class | Ref. |
|---|---|---|---|---|
| 2017 | Andi Sullivan * | Stanford | Senior | |
| 2018 | Jordan DiBiasi | Stanford | Senior | |
| 2019 | Catarina Macario * | Stanford | Junior | |
| 2020 | Delanie Sheehan | UCLA | Senior | |
| 2021 | Croix Bethune | USC | Junior | |
| 2022 | Croix Bethune (2) | USC | Senior | |
| 2023 | Jasmine Aikey | Stanford | Sophomore | |

== Defender of the Year ==
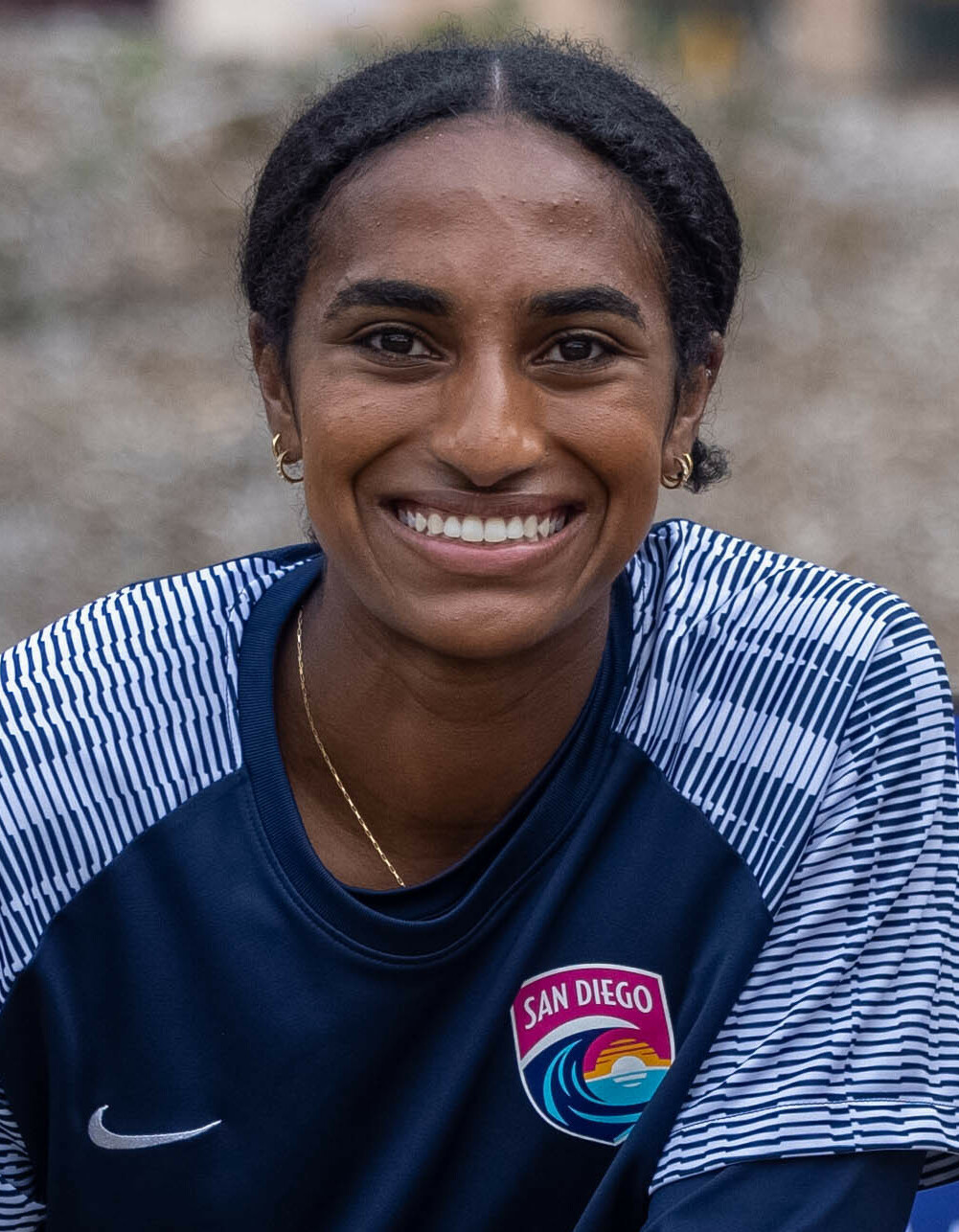
Naomi Girma, Stanford, 2× Pac-12 Defender of the Year

Pac-12 Conference Defender of the Year
| Season | Player | School | Class | Ref. |
|---|---|---|---|---|
| 1999 | Andrea Morelli | Washington | Sophomore | |
| 2014 | Abby Dahlkemper | UCLA | Senior | |
| 2015 | Kayla Mills | USC | Senior | |
| 2016 | Mandy Freeman | USC | Senior | |
| 2017 | Tierna Davidson | Stanford | Sophomore | |
| 2018 | Alana Cook | Stanford | Senior | |
| 2019 | Naomi Girma | Stanford | Sophomore | |
| 2020 | Kiki Pickett | Stanford | Senior | |
| 2021 | Naomi Girma (2) | Stanford | Senior | |
| 2022 | Lilly Reale * | UCLA | Sophomore | |
| 2023 | Lilly Reale (2) | UCLA | Junior | |

== Goalkeeper of the Year ==
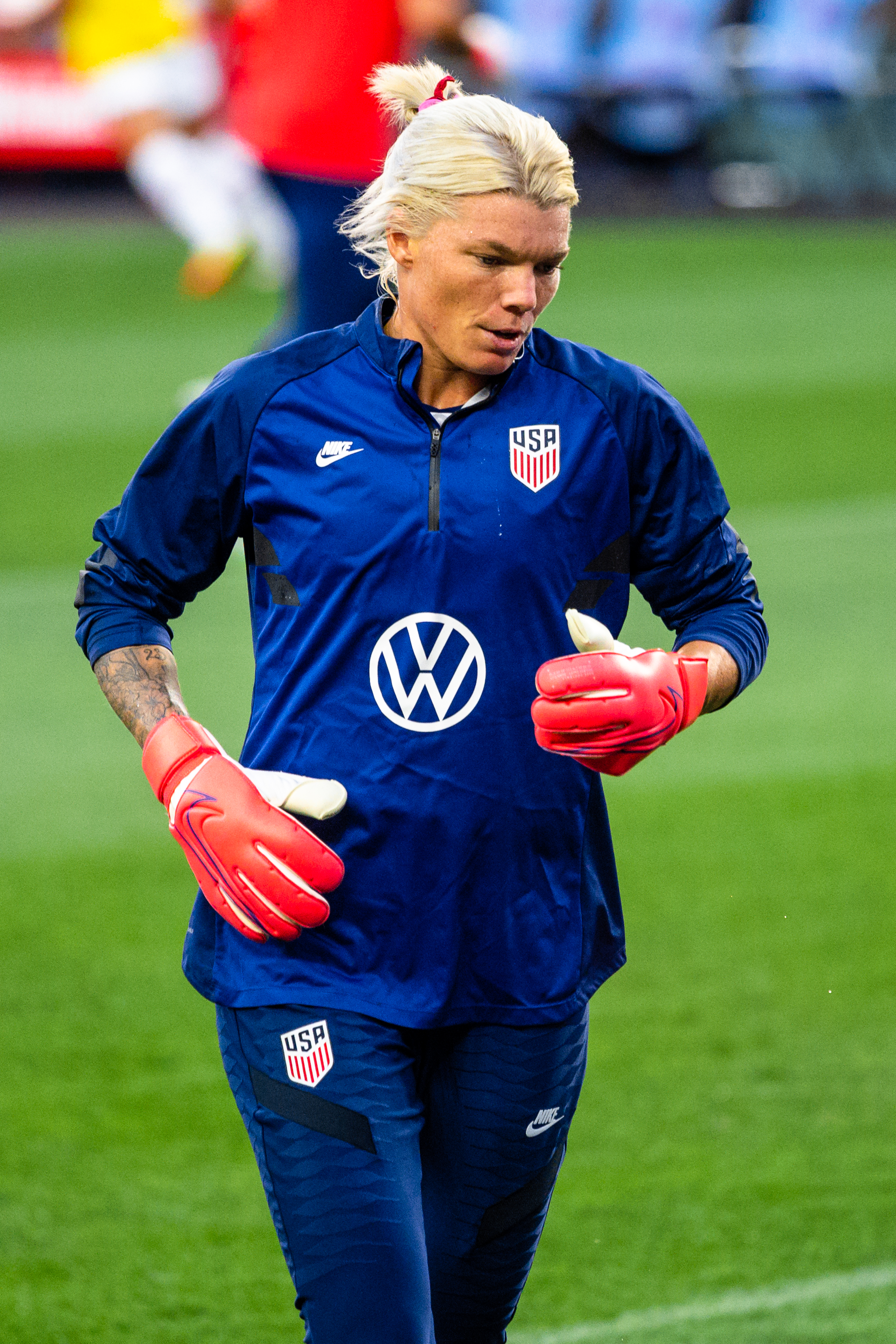
Jane Campbell, Stanford, 2015

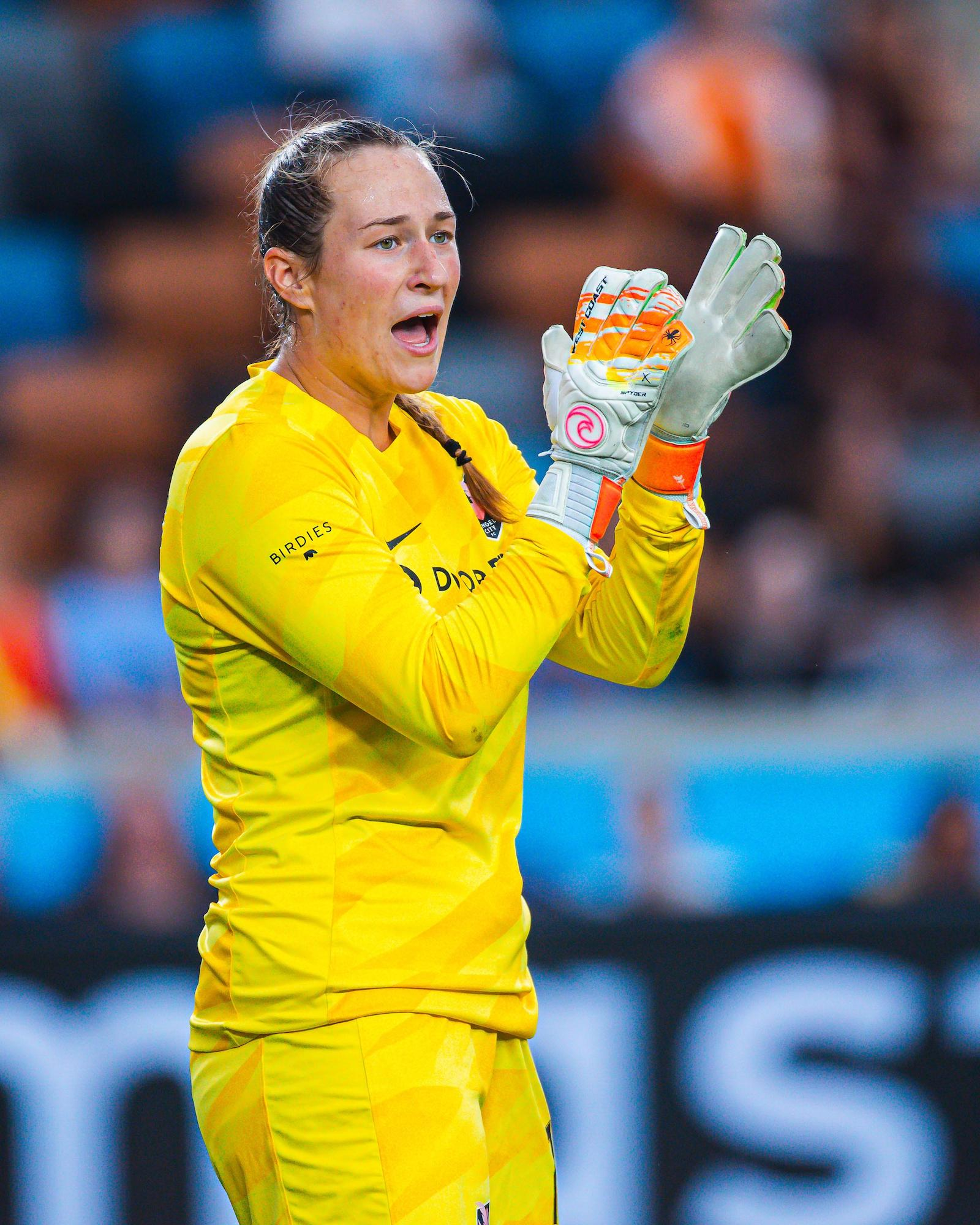
Angelina Anderson, California, 2019

Pac-12 Conference Goalkeeper of the Year
| Season | Player | School | Class | Ref. |
|---|---|---|---|---|
| 2014 | Katelyn Rowland | UCLA | Senior | |
| 2015 | Jane Campbell | Stanford | Senior | |
| 2016 | Sammy Jo Prudhomme | USC | Senior | |
| 2017 | Emily Boyd | California | Senior | |
| 2018 | Kaylie Collins | USC | Sophomore | |
| 2019 | Angelina Anderson | California | Freshman | |
| 2020 | Lauren Brzykcy | UCLA | Junior | |
| 2021 | Nadia Cooper | Washington State | Freshman | |
| 2022 | Leah Freeman | Oregon | Junior | |
| 2023 | Ryan Campbell | Stanford | Senior | |

== Freshman of the Year ==
Pac-12 Conference Newcomer/Freshman of the Year
| Season | Player | School | Position | Ref. |
|---|---|---|---|---|
| 1998 | Stacey Tullock | Arizona State | Midfielder | |
| 1999 | Marcia Wallis | Stanford | Midfielder/forward | |
| 1999 | Jessica Winton | UCLA | Forward | |
| 2000 | Marcie Ward | Stanford | Forward | |
| 2001 | Megan Kakadelas | USC | Forward/midfielder | |
| 2002 | Elizabeth Bogus | Arizona State | Forward | |
| 2003 | Rosa Anna Tantillo | USC | Midfielder | |
| 2004 | Jodie Taylor | Oregon State | Forward | |
| 2005 | Amy Rodriguez | USC | Forward | |
| 2006 | Lauren Cheney | UCLA | Forward | |
| 2007 | Christen Press | Stanford | Forward | |
| 2008 | Lindsay Taylor | Stanford | Forward | |
| 2009 | Mariah Nogueira | Stanford | Midfielder | |
| 2010 | Jenna Richardson | Oregon State | Forward | |
| 2011 | Chioma Ubogagu | Stanford | Forward | |
| 2012 | Ifeoma Onumonu | California | Forward | |
| 2013 | Darian Jenkins | UCLA | Forward | |
| 2014 | Andi Sullivan | Stanford | Midfielder | |
| 2015 | Alana Cook | Stanford | Defender | |
| 2016 | Taylor Kornieck | Colorado | Midfielder | |
| 2017 | Catarina Macario | Stanford | Forward | |
| 2018 | Penelope Hocking | USC | Forward | |
| 2019 | Angelina Anderson | California | Goalkeeper | |
| 2020 | Reilyn Turner | UCLA | Forward | |
| 2021 | Nadia Cooper | Washington State | Goalkeeper | |
| 2022 | Elise Evans | Stanford | Defender | |
| 2023 | Maribel Flores | USC | Forward | |

== Coach of the Year ==
Pac-12 Conference Coach of the Year
| Season | Coach | School | Ref. |
|---|---|---|---|
| 1995 | Ian Sawyers | Stanford | |
| 1996 | Jim Millinder | USC | |
| 1997 | Joy Fawcett | UCLA | |
| 1998 | Jim Millinder (2) | USC | |
| 1999 | Steve Swanson | Stanford | |
| 2000 | Lesle Gallimore | Washington | |
| 2001 | Andy Nelson | Stanford | |
| 2002 | Dan Tobias | Washington State | |
| 2003 | Jill Ellis | UCLA | |
| 2004 | Dan Tobias (2) | Arizona | |
| 2005 | Kevin Boyd | California | |
| 2006 | Tara Erickson | Oregon | |
| 2007 | Jill Ellis (2) | UCLA | |
| 2008 | Paul Ratcliffe | Stanford | |
| 2009 | Paul Ratcliffe (2) | Stanford | |
| 2010 | Paul Ratcliffe (3) | Stanford | |
| 2011 | Paul Ratcliffe (4) | Stanford | |
| 2012 | Paul Ratcliffe (5) | Stanford | |
| 2013 | Keidane McAlpine | Washington State | |
| 2014 | Amanda Cromwell | UCLA | |
| 2015 | Paul Ratcliffe (6) | Stanford | |
| 2016 | Paul Ratcliffe (7) | Stanford | |
| 2017 | Paul Ratcliffe (8) | Stanford | |
| 2018 | Paul Ratcliffe (9) | Stanford | |
| 2019 | Lesle Gallimore (2) | Washington | |
| 2020 | Amanda Cromwell (2) | UCLA | |
| 2021 | Keidane McAlpine (2) | Washington State | |
| 2022 | Margueritte Aozasa | UCLA | |
| 2023 | Margueritte Aozasa (2) | UCLA | |

== See also ==
- Atlantic Coast Conference women's soccer awards
- Big 12 Conference women's soccer awards
- Big Ten Conference women's soccer awards
- Southeastern Conference women's soccer awards
