= Yazmeen Ryan =

American soccer player (born 1999)

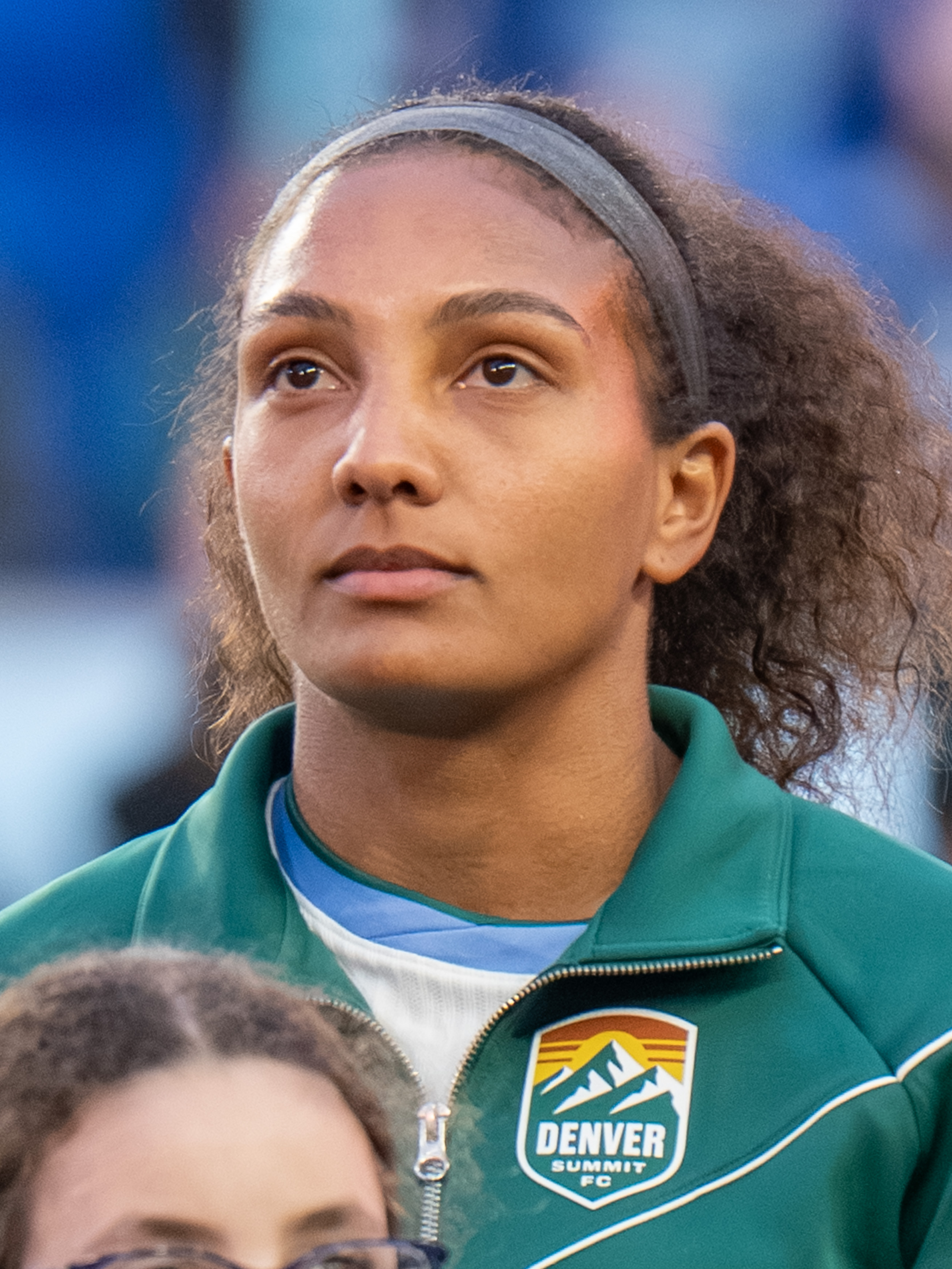
- Ryan with the Denver Summit in 2026

Personal information
- Full name: Yazmeen Ann Ryan
- Date of birth: February 25, 1999 (age 27)
- Place of birth: Norman, Oklahoma, US
- Height: 5 ft 6 in (1.68 m)
- Positions: Forward; midfielder

Team information
- Current team: Denver Summit
- Number: 9

Youth career
- Norman Celtic

College career
Years	Team	Apps	(Gls)
2017–2021	TCU Horned Frogs	68	(19)

Senior career*
Years	Team	Apps	(Gls)
2017–2019	Oklahoma City FC		
2021–2022	Portland Thorns	28	(2)
2023–2024	NJ/NY Gotham FC	46	(6)
2025–2026	Houston Dash	25	(4)
2026–	Denver Summit	29	(7)

International career^{‡}
2018	United States U18	2	(0)
2019	United States U23	3	(0)
2024–	United States	16	(2)
- * Club domestic league appearances and goals as of 06:41, November 8, 2026 (UTC) ‡ National team caps and goals as of January 27, 2026

Yazmeen Ann Ryan (born February 25, 1999) is an American professional soccer player who plays as a forward or a midfielder for Denver Summit FC of the National Women's Soccer League (NWSL) and the United States national team. She played college soccer for the TCU Horned Frogs and was drafted sixth overall by Portland Thorns FC in the 2021 NWSL Draft. She played for two years in Portland before joining NJ/NY Gotham FC. Ryan has won two NWSL Championships, one each with Portland and Gotham.

== Early life ==
Ryan grew up in Norman, Oklahoma, and attended Norman North High School. She played for the club team Oklahoma Celtic. As a freshman, she led Norman North to their first-ever girls soccer state championship.

== College career ==
Ryan joined the TCU Horned Frogs as an attacking midfielder in 2017 and captained the team in 2020. She led the team to their first-ever Big 12 conference championship; however, Ryan missed the championship-clinching game due to injury.

While in college, Ryan played for Oklahoma City FC of the Women's Premier Soccer League and was named to the club's all-time Best XI.

== Club career ==
=== Portland Thorns ===
Ryan was drafted at No. 6 overall by the Portland Thorns in the 2021 NWSL Draft. Ryan was the Thorns' "top target". After they attempted to trade into the #4 draft position, the Thorns eventually traded two later picks plus an international slot to move up to select Ryan. Ryan appeared in the starting lineup for the Portland Thorns in the 2022 NWSL Championship Final on October 29, 2022.

=== NJ/NY Gotham FC ===
On January 5, 2023, Ryan was traded to NJ/NY Gotham FC as part of a three-team trade. She made the most appearances for Gotham of any player in the 2023 season. She started in the 2023 NWSL Championship Final, in which Gotham defeated OL Reign 2–1.

=== Houston Dash ===
The Houston Dash announced on December 7, 2024, that they had acquired Ryan from Gotham in exchange for $80,000 in intra-league transfer funds, $400,000 of allocation money, and a 2025 NWSL international roster spot. In her lone season in Houston, Ryan started 24 matches and led the Dash in both goals and shots on goal.

=== Denver Summit ===
In March 2026, the Dash traded Ryan and teammate Delanie Sheehan to NWSL expansion team Denver Summit FC.

== International career ==
Ryan made two appearances for the United States under-18 team in April 2018 and three for the under-23 team in April 2019.

She received her first call-up to the senior national team in October 2024 for the team's Olympic gold medal victory tour. Ryan earned her first cap on October 24, 2024, in a 3–1 victory over Iceland.

== Career statistics ==
=== Club ===
As of November 2, 2025

Appearances and goals by club, season and competition
Club	Season	League			Cup (Note: Includes the NWSL Challenge Cup)		Playoffs (Note: Includes NWSL Playoffs.)		Continental (Note: Includes CONCACAF W Champions Cup.)		Other		Total	
Club	Season	Division	Apps	Goals	Apps	Goals	Apps	Goals	Apps	Goals	Apps	Goals	Apps	Goals
Portland Thorns FC	2021	NWSL	10	0	0	0	1	0	—		—		11	0
Portland Thorns FC	2022	NWSL	18	2	5	1	2	0	—		—		25	3
Portland Thorns FC	Total		28	2	5	1	3	0	0	0	0	0	36	3
NJ/NY Gotham FC	2023	NWSL	21	1	6	1	3	1	—		—		30	3
NJ/NY Gotham FC	2024	NWSL	25	5	1	0	2	0	3	3	4 (Note: Includes the NWSL x Liga MX Femenil Summer Cup)	1	35	9
NJ/NY Gotham FC	Total		46	6	7	1	5	1	3	3	4	1	65	12
Houston Dash	2025	NWSL	22	4	—		0	0	—		0	0	22	4
Career total			96	12	12	2	8	0	3	3	4	1	123	19

=== International ===
As of match played October 29, 2025

National Team	Year	Apps	Goals
United States	2024	4	0
United States	2025	11	2
United States	2026	1	0
Total		16	2

Scores and results list United States's goal tally first, score column indicates score after each Ryan goal.

List of international goals scored by Yazmeen Ryan
No.	Date	Venue	Opponent	Score	Result	Competition	Ref.
1	June 29, 2025	Cincinnati, Ohio	Republic of Ireland	3–0	4–0	Friendly	
2	July 2, 2025	Washington, D.C.	Canada	3–0	3–0	Friendly	

== Honors ==
Portland Thorns FC

- NWSL Championship: 2022

NJ/NY Gotham FC

- NWSL Championship: 2023

Individual

- NWSL Second XI: 2024
