= Nadia Cooper =

American soccer player (born 2003)

Personal information
- Full name: Nadia Michelle Cooper
- Date of birth: January 19, 2003 (age 23)
- Place of birth: Fort Bragg, North Carolina, U.S.
- Height: 5 ft 8 in (1.73 m)
- Position: Goalkeeper

College career
Years	Team	Apps	(Gls)
2021–2024	Washington State Cougars	73	(0)

Senior career*
Years	Team	Apps	(Gls)
2025	Minnesota Aurora	5	(0)
2025	Houston Dash	0	(0)

International career
2018	United States U-15		
2018–2020	United States U-17		
- * Club domestic league appearances and goals as of September 12, 2025

Nadia Michelle Cooper (born January 19, 2003) is an American professional soccer player who plays as a goalkeeper. She played college soccer for the Washington State Cougars and was named the Pac-12 Goalkeeper of the Year as a freshman in 2021.

== Early life ==
Cooper was born in Fort Bragg, North Carolina, to Myron and Caroline Cooper, and has five sisters. After her family moved to Katy, Texas, she played club soccer for the Albion Hurricanes, Shattuck-Saint Mary's, and Challenge SC. She committed to Washington State during her freshman year at Shattuck-Saint Mary's, a boarding school in Faribault, Minnesota.

== College career ==
Cooper became the starter for the Washington State Cougars early into her freshman season in 2021. She conceded zero goals for over 500 minutes to begin her career and finished her freshman season with 7 solo clean sheets (11 total) against 10 goals allowed in 17 appearances. She helped the Cougars place third in the Pac-12 Conference, their best result in six years, and return to the NCAA tournament after a two-year absence, reaching the second round. Cooper was named first-team All-Pac-12, the Pac-12 Freshman of the Year, and the Pac-12 Goalkeeper of the Year, becoming the third Cougar to receive a conference award. TopDrawerSoccer ranked her as the best freshman goalkeeper in the nation. In her senior season in 2024, the program's first year West Coast Conference (WCC), Cooper kept 7 shutouts in 19 games, earning second-team All-WCC honors. She completed her college career with 21 solo clean sheets in 73 appearances.

== Club career ==
After playing for Minnesota Aurora in the summer USL W League, Cooper joined the Houston Dash as a trialist in mid-2025. On August 23, the Dash announced that Cooper had signed a short-term contract with the club through September 12. On October 1, she re-signed with the Dash on a roster relief deal until the end of the season. She did not make a professional appearance prior to the expiration of her contract.

== International career ==
Cooper trained and played friendlies with the United States under-15 and under-17 teams from 2018 to 2020. She was set to play at the 2020 CONCACAF Women's U-17 Championship before the tournament was cancelled due to the COVID-19 pandemic. She later trained with the under-20 team in 2021 and 2022.

== Honors and awards ==
Individual

- First-team All-Pac-12: 2021
- Pac-12 Goalkeeper of the Year: 2021
- Pac-12 Freshman of the Year: 2021
