= Ryan Campbell (soccer) =

American soccer player (born 2002)

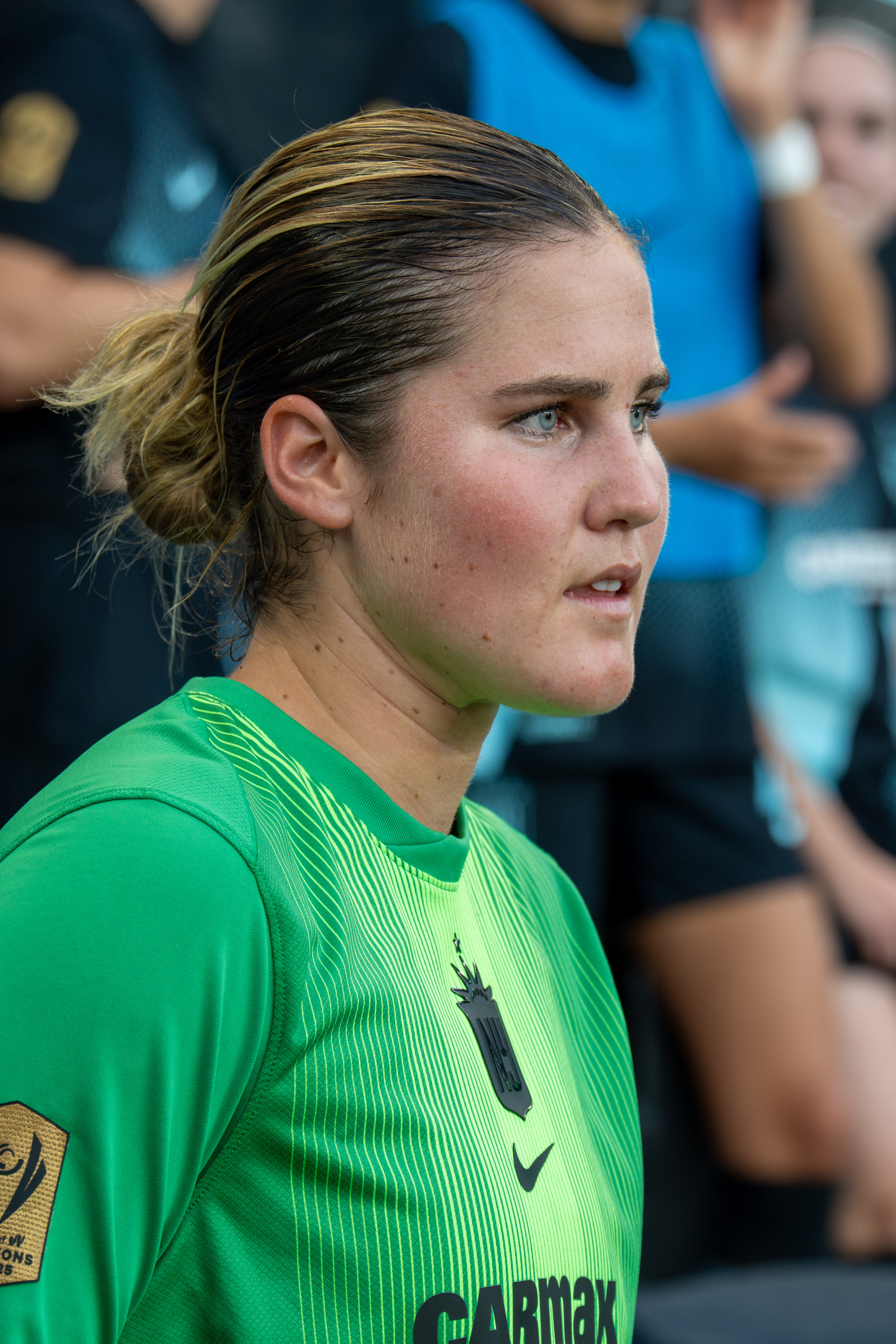
- Campbell with Gotham FC in 2025

Personal information
- Full name: Ryan Cady Campbell
- Date of birth: March 18, 2002 (age 24)
- Place of birth: Mission Viejo, California, United States
- Height: 5 ft 11 in (1.80 m)
- Position: Goalkeeper

Team information
- Current team: Lexington SC (on loan from Gotham FC)
- Number: 24

Youth career
- So Cal Blues

College career
Years	Team	Apps	(Gls)
2020–2023	Stanford Cardinal	49	(0)
2024	UCLA Bruins	24	(0)

Senior career*
Years	Team	Apps	(Gls)
2025–	Gotham FC	1	(0)
2026–	→ Lexington SC (loan)	1	(0)
- * Club domestic league appearances and goals as of 05:26, August 16, 2026 (UTC)

Ryan Cady Campbell (born March 18, 2002) is an American professional soccer player who plays as a goalkeeper for USL Super League club Lexington SC, on loan from Gotham FC. She played college soccer for the Stanford Cardinal and the UCLA Bruins and was named the Pac-12 Goalkeeper of the Year with Stanford in 2023.

== Early life ==
Campbell was born in Mission Viejo, California, and grew up in Laguna Beach. She attended JSerra Catholic High School in San Juan Capistrano, where she played soccer, basketball, and tennis. With the soccer team, she won three consecutive CIF Southern Section state championships and was named the Trinity League defensive player of the year in 2019. She played club soccer for So Cal Blues, winning four ECNL national championships and earning ECNL All-American honors in 2018. She initially committed to UCLA, but switched her commitment to Stanford.

== College career ==
=== Stanford Cardinal ===
Campbell served as the understudy to starting goalkeeper Katie Meyer during her first two seasons with the Stanford Cardinal, redshirting as a freshman and making only five appearances as a sophomore in 2021. Meyer died by suicide in the spring of 2022. In her junior season in 2022, Campbell started 21 games and kept 8 solo clean sheets (along with 4 combined) against only 11 goals allowed, earning third-team All-Pac-12 honors. Stanford won the Pac-12 Conference but lost to BYU on penalties in the NCAA tournament second round. In her senior season in 2023, she started 23 games and kept 11 solo clean sheets (plus 2 combined) against only 13 goals allowed. Until the national title game, Stanford had allowed no more than one goal per game all season and conceded only once through the first five rounds in the NCAA tournament. The team was pummeled 5–1 by Florida State in the final, ending their otherwise undefeated season. Campbell was named first-team All-Pac-12 and the Pac-12 Goalkeeper of the Year at the end of the season.

=== UCLA Bruins ===
Campbell transferred to the UCLA Bruins for her graduate season in 2024. She played every minute in all 24 games and led the nation with 16 clean sheets against 10 goals allowed. In the program's first season in the Big Ten Conference, she allowed no goals as UCLA won the Big Ten tournament. The team lost to Virginia Tech in the NCAA tournament second round. Campbell was named second-team All-Big Ten and fourth-team All-American by United Soccer Coaches.

== Club career ==
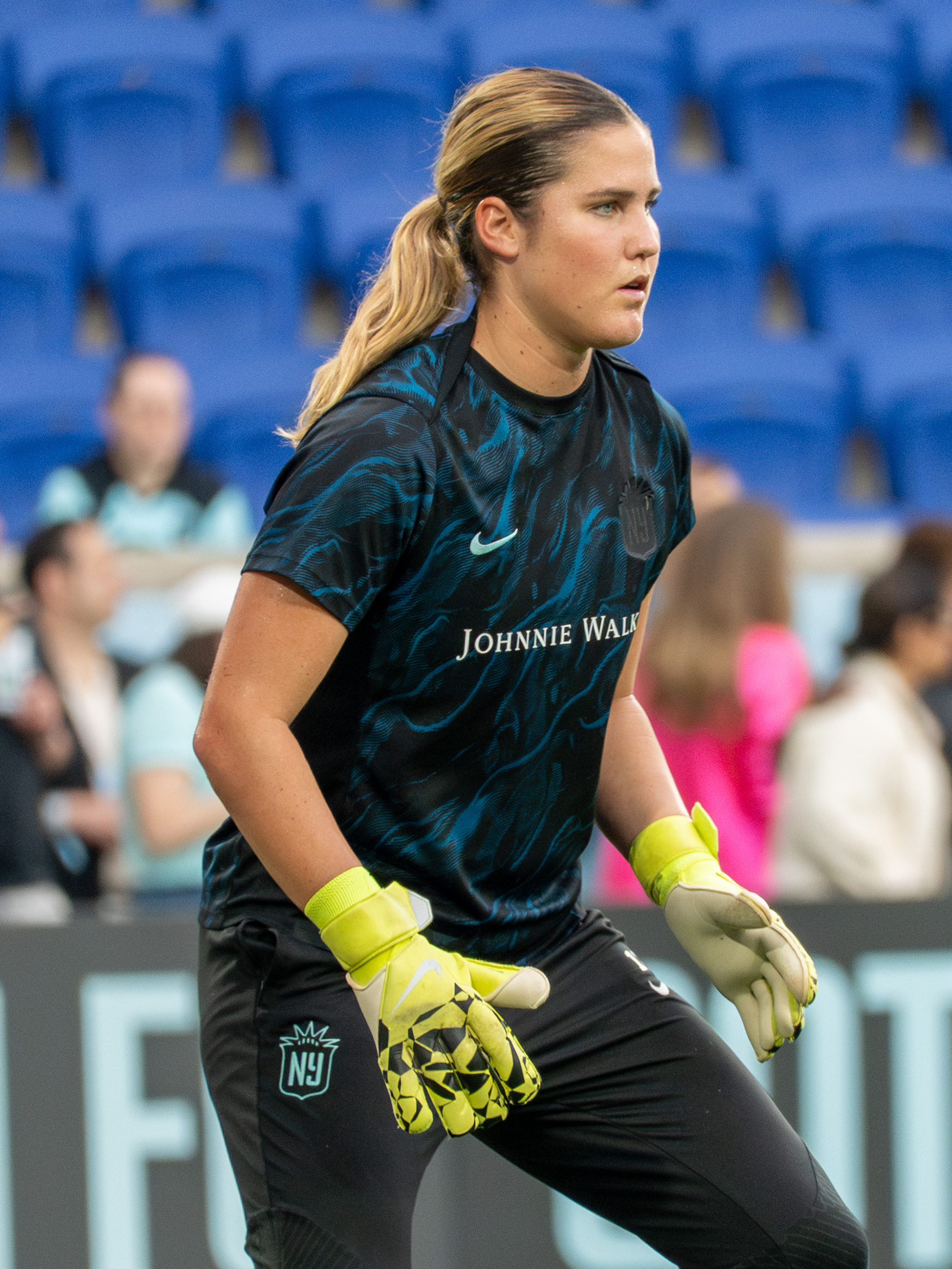
Campbell warming up with Gotham FC in 2025

Gotham FC announced on January 10, 2025, that they had signed Campbell to her first professional contract on a one-year contract. On March 15, she picked up a yellow card from the bench for delay of game in stoppage time of the season opener against the Seattle Reign. In April, after injuries to Campbell and Shelby Hogan, assistant goalkeeping coach Michelle Betos briefly came out of retirement to back up Ann-Katrin Berger. Campbell made her professional debut against the Utah Royals on June 13, replacing Berger to see out the last 10 minutes as Gotham was down to nine players by the end of their 3–0 victory. On August 12, Gotham announced a three-year contract extension for Campbell, keeping her with the club through 2028. She made her first professional start on September 17, featuring in a 4–1 win against the Vancouver Rise Academy in the CONCACAF W Champions Cup group stage. The third-choice rookie was unused the rest of the season as Gotham won the 2025 NWSL Championship over the Washington Spirit, the club's second NWSL title.

On July 16, 2026, Campbell joined USL Super League champions Lexington SC on loan for the rest of the year with the option to extend the loan another six months. She made her Super League debut on August 15, 2026, keeping a clean sheet in Lexington's season-opening victory over Brooklyn FC.

== International career ==
Campbell trained with the United States youth national team at the under-14, under-15, under-16, under-17, and under-23 levels.

== Personal life ==
Campbell is the daughter of Terry and Joe Campbell and has an older brother. She is close friends with former UCLA and Gotham FC teammate Lilly Reale. She was Gotham's nominee for the Lauren Holiday Impact Award in 2025, recognizing her work with Katie's Save, a mental health advocacy group founded in honor of her Stanford teammate Katie Meyer.

== Honors and awards ==
Stanford Cardinal

- Pac-12 Conference: 2022

UCLA Bruins

- Big Ten Conference tournament: 2024

Gotham FC

- NWSL Championship: 2025
- NWSL Challenge Cup: 2026
- CONCACAF W Champions Cup: 2024–25

Individual

- Fourth-team All-American: 2024
- Pac-12 Goalkeeper of the Year: 2023
- First-team All-Pac-12: 2023
- Second-team All-Big Ten: 2024
- Third-team All-Pac-12: 2022
