= Juan Carlos Amorós =

Spanish football manager (born 1984)

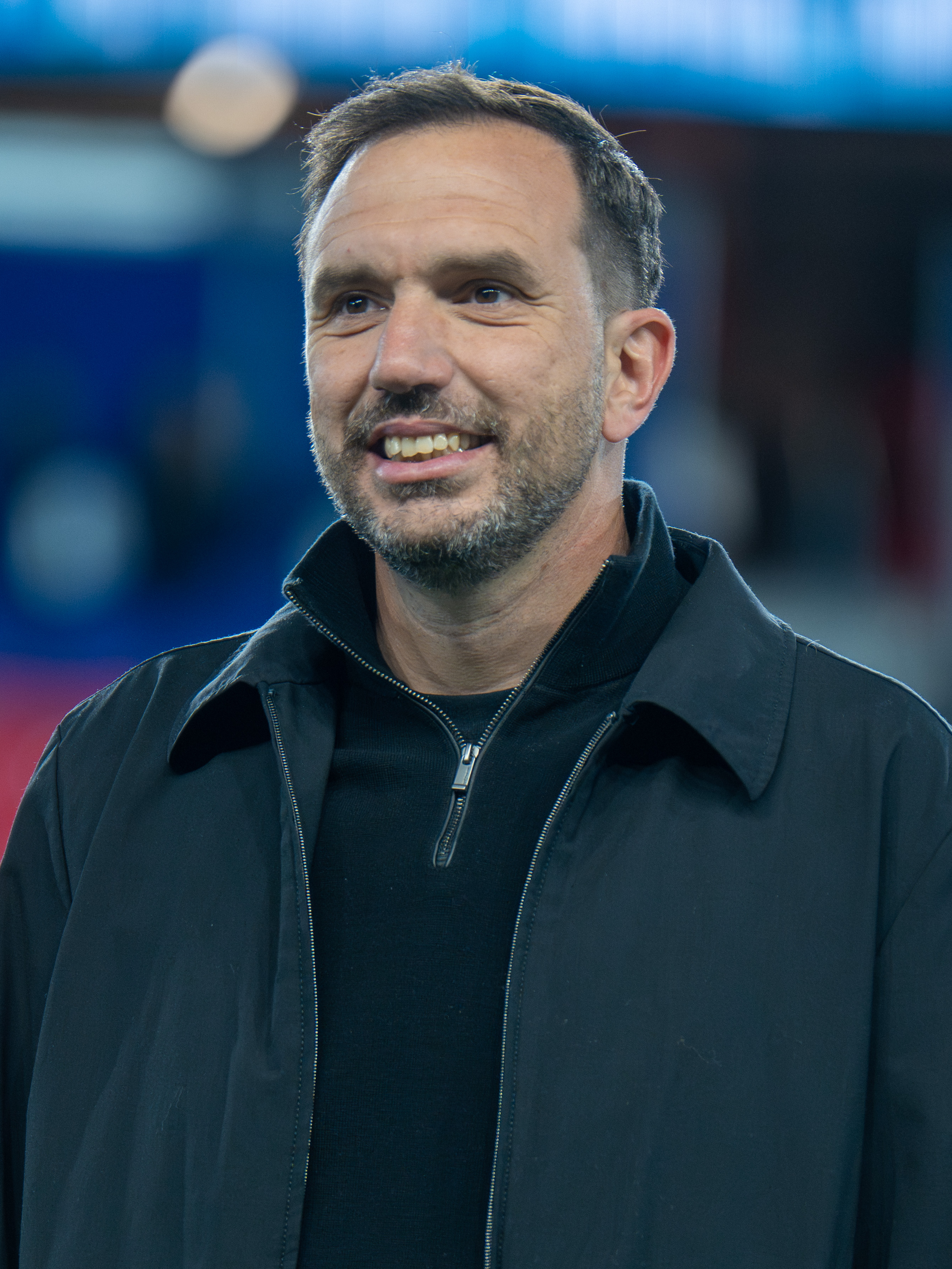
- Amorós in 2026

Personal information
- Full name: Juan Carlos Amorós López
- Date of birth: 3 June 1984 (age 42)
- Place of birth: Madrid, Spain

Team information
- Current team: Gotham FC (head coach)

Managerial career
- Years: Team
- 2011–2020: Tottenham Hotspur Women
- 2021–2022: Real Betis Féminas
- 2022: Houston Dash (interim)
- 2023–: Gotham FC

Juan Carlos Amorós López (born 3 June 1984) is a Spanish football manager who is currently the head coach of Gotham FC of the American National Women's Soccer League (NWSL). He previously managed NWSL club Houston Dash, and the women's sides of Spanish club Real Betis, and English club Tottenham Hotspur.

== Managerial career ==
=== Tottenham Hotspur ===
Amorós began his coaching career at Tottenham Hotspur F.C. Women in 2011, as co-manager with Karen Hills. Following the club's promotion to the top-flight Women's Super League after the 2018–19 season, Hills and Amorós signed two-year deals to continue in their roles. However, they were both fired seven matches into the 2019–20 season and replaced with England women's national football team assistant Rehanne Skinner.

=== Real Betis ===
On 16 January 2021, Primera Iberdrola club Real Betis Féminas signed Amorós to a contract until 30 June 2021, with an option to extend by one year. However, Amorós and the club mutually ended the contract in May 2022 following a 9th-place finish in the 2021–22 season.

=== Houston Dash ===
Following the suspension of head coach and general manager James Clarkson, the Houston Dash appointed assistant coach Sarah Lowdon as acting head coach. On 15 June 2022, the Dash appointed Amorós as the club's new interim head coach pending visa approval. Amorós would not join the team until 12 July while waiting for his visa. In his first match managing the Dash on 16 July, with newly acquired striker Ebony Salmon scoring a hat-trick, the Dash defeated the Chicago Red Stars 4–1.

=== Gotham FC ===
After leading Houston Dash to their first-ever NWSL Playoffs appearance as interim head coach in 2022, Amorós signed on as fellow NWSL club Gotham FC's permanent head coach on a three-year contract in November 2022. With Amorós at the helm, Gotham finished the 2023 regular season with an 8–7–7 record and the team led the NWSL in possessions won (1,544) and shots faced (205). After taking Gotham from last place with the worst record in the league to the NWSL Championship, Amorós was named the 2023 National Women's Soccer League Coach of the Year. In May 2025, Amorós led Gotham to win the inaugural CONCACAF W Champions Cup. In November, he led Gotham FC to their 2nd NWSL Championship in a 1–0 win against Washington Spirit in San Jose.

== Honours ==
Tottenham Hotspur Women

- FA South-East Combination: 2010–11
- London County Senior Cup: 2011–12
- Ryman's Women's Cup: 2015–16, 2016–17
- FA Women's Premier League Cup: 2015–16, 2016–17
- FA Women's Premier League Championship Play-off: 2016–17
- FA Women's Premier League Southern Division: 2016–17

Gotham FC

- NWSL Championship: 2023, 2025
- CONCACAF W Champions Cup: 2024–25
- The Women's Cup: 2024
- FIFA Women's Champions Cup third place: 2026

Individual

- FA Manager of the Year: 2018–19
- NWSL Coach of the Year: 2023
