= 2025 National Women's Soccer League season =

13th season of the National Women's Soccer League

National Women's Soccer League
- Season: 2025
- Dates: March 14 – November 2 (regular season); November 7 – November 22 (playoffs)
- Champions: Gotham FC (2nd title)
- NWSL Shield: Kansas City Current (1st shield)
- Challenge Cup: Washington Spirit (1st cup)
- CONCACAF W Champions Cup: Gotham FC; Kansas City Current; Washington Spirit
- Matches: 182
- Goals: 484 (2.66 per match)
- Top goalscorer: Temwa Chawinga (15)
- Biggest home win: 6 goals ORL 6–0 CHI (Mar 14)
- Biggest away win: 4 goals LA 0–4 GFC (Apr 18)
- Highest scoring: 7 goals WAS 3–4 LA (May 2); SD 5–2 NC (May 25); CHI 5–2 ORL (Sep 7); SD 6–1 CHI (Oct 18)
- Longest winning run: 8 wins Kansas City Current (May 11 – Aug 8)
- Longest unbeaten run: 17 matches Kansas City Current (May 11 – Oct 11)
- Longest winless run: 15 matches Bay FC (Jun 13 – Nov 2)
- Longest losing run: 4 losses Utah Royals (May 23 – Jun 21); Bay FC (Aug 16 – Sep 6)
- Highest attendance: 40,091; BAY 2–3 WAS (Aug 23)
- Lowest attendance: 1,806; CHI 0–1 LOU (Mar 30)
- Total attendance: 1,926,090
- Average attendance: 10,583
- All statistics correct as of November 2, 2025.

The 2025 National Women's Soccer League season was the 13th season for the National Women's Soccer League (NWSL), the top division of women's soccer in the United States. Including the NWSL's two professional predecessors, Women's Professional Soccer (2009–2011) and the Women's United Soccer Association (2001–2003), it was the 19th overall season of FIFA and USSF-sanctioned top division women's soccer in the United States.

The league had 14 teams, unchanged from the 2024 season, which set a record for average attendance and television ratings. It is the second under a set of national broadcasting agreements with CBS Sports, ESPN, Amazon Prime Video and Scripps Sports that run through the 2027 season. The 2025 season did not see the return of the NWSL x Liga MX Femenil Summer Cup, an international competition in 2024 between clubs from the NWSL and Liga MX Femenil of Mexico. It was the first season without a college draft; the 2025 rookie class entered the league as free agents. All teams played 26 regular-season matches.

The defending NWSL Championship and NWSL Shield winner was the Orlando Pride. The Kansas City Current won the 2025 NWSL Shield with a record 21 wins and a record 65 points.

Gotham FC defeated the Washington Spirit in the championship match, 1–0, to win their second title.

== Teams, stadiums, and personnel ==
=== Team names ===
The Chicago Red Stars re-branded to Chicago Stars FC prior to the season.

NJ/NY Gotham FC re-named to Gotham FC prior to the season.

=== Stadiums and locations ===
Team	Stadium	Capacity
Angel City FC	BMO Stadium	22,000
Bay FC	PayPal Park	18,000
Chicago Stars FC	SeatGeek Stadium	20,000
Houston Dash	Shell Energy Stadium	22,039
Kansas City Current	CPKC Stadium	11,500
Gotham FC	Sports Illustrated Stadium	25,000
North Carolina Courage	First Horizon Stadium at WakeMed Soccer Park	10,000
Orlando Pride	Inter&Co Stadium	25,500
Portland Thorns FC	Providence Park	25,218
Racing Louisville FC	Lynn Family Stadium	11,700 (Note: Seated capacity; full capacity with standing room is 15,304.)
San Diego Wave FC	Snapdragon Stadium	35,000
Seattle Reign FC	Lumen Field	10,000 (Note: Lumen Field has a capacity of 68,740; standard configuration for Reign games seats 10,000 but can expand based on demand for individual games.)
Utah Royals	America First Field	20,213
Washington Spirit	Audi Field	20,000

Locations of the National Women's Soccer League teams in 2025.

=== Personnel and sponsorship ===
Note: All teams use Nike as their kit manufacturer as part of a league-wide sponsorship agreement renewed in November 2021.

Team	Head coach	Captain(s)	Shirt sponsor
Angel City FC	(Norway) Alexander Straus	(New Zealand) Ali Riley (United States) Sarah Gorden	DoorDash
Bay FC	(United States) Albertin Montoya	(United States) Abby Dahlkemper (United States) Tess Boade	Sutter Health
Chicago Stars FC	(Sweden) Anders Jacobson (interim)	(United States) Alyssa Naeher	Wintrust
Gotham FC	(Spain) Juan Carlos Amorós	(United States) Tierna Davidson (United States) Mandy Freeman	CarMax
Houston Dash	(United States) Fabrice Gautrat	(United States) Jane Campbell	MD Anderson Cancer Center
Kansas City Current	(North Macedonia) Vlatko Andonovski	(United States) Lo'eau LaBonta	United Way of Greater Kansas City
North Carolina Courage	(England) Nathan Thackeray (interim)	(Republic of Ireland) Denise O'Sullivan	Merz Aesthetics
Orlando Pride	(England) Seb Hines	(Brazil) Marta	Orlando Health
Portland Thorns FC	(England) Rob Gale	(United States) Sam Coffey	ring
Racing Louisville FC	(United States) Bev Yanez	(United States) Arin Wright	GE Appliances
San Diego Wave FC	(Sweden) Jonas Eidevall	(Canada) Kailen Sheridan	Kaiser Permanente
Seattle Reign FC	(England) Laura Harvey	(United States) Lauren Barnes	Trupanion
Utah Royals	(Belgium) Jimmy Coenraets	(United States) Paige Monaghan	America First Credit Union
Washington Spirit	(Spain) Adrián González	(United States) Aubrey Kingsbury	CVS Health

=== Coaching changes ===
Team	Outgoing coach	Manner of departure	Date of vacancy	Position in table	Incoming coach	Date of appointment	Ref.
San Diego Wave FC	(United States) Landon Donovan (interim)	End of interim period	November 18, 2024	Preseason	(Sweden) Jonas Eidevall	January 7, 2025	
Houston Dash	(England) Ricky Clarke (interim)	End of interim period	December 9, 2024	Preseason	(United States) Fabrice Gautrat	January 3, 2025	
Angel City FC	(England) Becki Tweed	Fired	December 9, 2024	Preseason	(Wales) Eleri Earnshaw (interim)	December 9, 2024	
Angel City FC	(Wales) Eleri Earnshaw (interim)	End of interim period	January 22, 2025	Preseason	(England) Sam Laity (interim)	January 22, 2025	
Chicago Stars FC	(Jamaica) Lorne Donaldson	Fired	April 30, 2025	14th	(Japan) Masaki Hemmi (interim)	April 30, 2025	
Angel City FC	(England) Sam Laity (interim)	End of interim period	May 31, 2025	7th	(Norway) Alexander Straus	June 1, 2025	
Washington Spirit	(Spain) Jonatan Giráldez	Signed with Lyon	June 23, 2025	4th	(Spain) Adrián González	July 18, 2025	
Chicago Stars FC	(Japan) Masaki Hemmi (interim)	End of interim period	July 3, 2025	13th	(United States) Ella Masar (interim)	July 3, 2025	
North Carolina Courage	(United States) Sean Nahas	Fired	August 6, 2025	9th	(England) Nathan Thackeray (interim)	August 6, 2025	
Chicago Stars FC	(United States) Ella Masar (interim)	End of interim period	August 13, 2025	13th	(Sweden) Anders Jacobson (interim)	August 13, 2025	

== Regular season ==
=== Standings ===
Pos	Team	Pld	W	D	L	GF	GA	GD	Pts	Qualification
1	Kansas City Current (S)	26	21	2	3	49	13	+36	65	Playoffs and CONCACAF W Champions Cup
2	Washington Spirit	26	12	8	6	42	33	+9	44	Playoffs and CONCACAF W Champions Cup
3	Portland Thorns FC	26	11	7	8	36	29	+7	40	Playoffs
4	Orlando Pride	26	11	7	8	33	27	+6	40	Playoffs
5	Seattle Reign FC	26	10	9	7	32	29	+3	39	Playoffs
6	San Diego Wave FC	26	10	7	9	41	34	+7	37	Playoffs
7	Racing Louisville FC	26	10	7	9	35	38	−3	37	Playoffs
8	Gotham FC (C)	26	9	9	8	35	25	+10	36	Playoffs and CONCACAF W Champions Cup
9	North Carolina Courage	26	9	8	9	37	39	−2	35	
10	Houston Dash	26	8	6	12	27	39	−12	30	
11	Angel City FC	26	7	6	13	31	41	−10	27	
12	Utah Royals	26	6	7	13	28	42	−14	25	
13	Bay FC	26	4	8	14	26	41	−15	20	
14	Chicago Stars FC	26	3	11	12	32	54	−22	20	

Source: NWSL
Rules for classification: 1) points; 2) total goal difference; 3) total wins; 4) total goals scored; 5) head-to-head points; 6) head-to-head goals scored; 7) fewest disciplinary points; 8) coin toss (if 2 clubs tied) or drawing of lots (if ≥3 clubs tied).
(C) Champions; (S) NWSL Shield

==== Tiebreakers ====
The initial determining factor for a team's position in the standings is most points earned, with three points earned for a win, one point for a draw, and zero points for a loss. If two or more teams tie in total points total when determining rank, playoff qualification, and seeding, the NWSL uses the following tiebreaker criteria, going down the list until all teams are ranked.

1. Greater goal difference across the entire regular season (against all teams, not just tied teams).
2. Most total wins across the entire regular season (against all teams, not just tied teams).
3. Most goals scored across the entire regular season (against all teams, not just tied teams).
4. Head-to-head results (total points) between the tied teams.
5. Head-to-head most goals scored between the tied teams.
6. Fewest disciplinary points accumulated across the entire regular season (against all teams, not just tied teams).
7. Coin flip (if two teams are tied) or drawing of lots (if three or more teams are tied).

=== Format ===
The regular season began on March 14 with each team playing 26 matches—13 at home and 13 away. Matches were paused from June 23 to July 31 to accommodate international competitions, including the UEFA Women's Euro and Copa América Femenina. The regular season culminated with "Decision Day" on November 2, when most teams played at the same time. The NWSL playoffs will begin on November 7 and finish with the NWSL Championship on November 22.

=== Results ===
Home \ Away	BAY	CHI	HOU	KC	LA	LOU	NC	NJY	ORL	POR	SD	SEA	UTA	WAS
Bay FC	—	1–2	2–2	0–2	2–0	2–0	1–4	1–1	0–1	1–0	1–2	1–1	0–2	2–3
Chicago Stars FC	1–1	—	1–2	1–3	2–1	0–1	3–3	1–1	5–2	1–1	0–3	2–2	2–2	2–3
Houston Dash	2–2	1–0	—	1–0	1–3	1–2	2–1	0–0	1–1	1–4	2–3	1–1	1–0	1–2
Kansas City Current	4–1	4–1	2–0	—	1–0	4–2	2–0	2–0	0–0	3–1	2–1	2–0	3–0	0–0
Angel City FC	2–1	2–2	2–0	0–1	—	2–3	1–2	0–4	1–0	0–2	1–1	2–1	2–0	2–2
Racing Louisville FC	1–0	1–1	1–1	0–2	1–0	—	1–1	1–0	2–0	1–2	1–4	0–1	3–2	0–2
North Carolina Courage	0–1	2–0	2–1	3–2	2–1	1–3	—	3–2	1–1	1–1	0–0	1–2	1–1	1–1
Gotham FC	2–1	0–0	1–2	1–2	3–1	2–2	3–1	—	0–2	3–0	0–1	0–0	0–0	0–0
Orlando Pride	1–1	6–0	1–0	0–1	3–2	1–1	0–1	0–2	—	1–0	2–1	1–1	1–1	0–1
Portland Thorns FC	2–1	1–0	2–0	0–2	1–1	3–3	0–0	4–1	1–0	—	1–1	4–2	1–2	2–0
San Diego Wave FC	2–1	6–1	0–3	0–2	1–1	0–1	5–2	0–2	1–2	1–1	—	1–2	3–2	0–0
Seattle Reign FC	1–1	3–3	0–1	1–0	2–0	1–0	2–1	1–1	0–1	1–0	0–0	—	2–1	1–2
Utah Royals	1–1	1–0	2–0	0–1	0–0	3–2	0–2	0–3	1–3	0–1	2–3	1–4	—	1–0
Washington Spirit	2–0	1–1	4–0	0–2	3–4	2–2	3–1	0–3	2–3	2–1	2–1	2–0	3–3	—

Source: NWSL
Legend: Blue = home team win; Yellow = draw; Red = away team win.

== Attendance ==
=== Average home attendances ===
Ranked from highest to lowest average attendance.

Regular season
Rank	Team	GP	Attendance	High	Low	Average
1	Portland Thorns FC	13	236,243	21,903	15,373	18,173
2	Angel City FC	13	211,336	19,841	11,147	16,257
3	Washington Spirit	13	198,362	19,254	12,140	15,259
4	Bay FC	13	192,695	40,091	10,798	14,823
5	San Diego Wave FC	13	174,550	18,465	10,403	13,427
6	Kansas City Current	13	149,500	11,500	11,500	11,500
7	Gotham FC	13	115,598	13,860	7,115	8,892
8	Utah Royals	13	113,452	17,085	5,051	8,727
9	Orlando Pride	13	109,832	19,237	5,307	8,449
10	Seattle Reign FC	13	102,310	10,117	5,912	7,870
11	North Carolina Courage	13	99,895	11,170	6,235	7,684
12	Houston Dash	13	78,533	8,436	5,084	6,041
13	Chicago Stars FC	13	72,009	26,492	1,806	5,539
14	Racing Louisville FC	13	71,775	8,113	2,847	5,521
	Total	182	1,926,090	40,091	1,806	10,583

Updated through 2025 Season

=== Highest attendances ===
Regular season
Rank	Home team	Score	Away team	Attendance	Date	Stadium
1	Bay FC	2–3	Washington Spirit	40,091*	August 23, 2025	Oracle Park
^{†}	Chicago Stars FC	2–2	Seattle Reign FC	26,942^{†}	June 14, 2025	Soldier Field
2	Portland Thorns FC	2–0	Houston Dash	21,903	November 2, 2025	Providence Park
3	Portland Thorns FC	4–2	Seattle Reign FC	21,811	August 10, 2025	Providence Park
4	Portland Thorns FC	2–0	Washington Spirit	21,268	June 17, 2025	Providence Park
5	Portland Thorns FC	2–1	Bay FC	21,104	October 4, 2025	Providence Park
6	Angel City FC	1–1	San Diego Wave FC	19,728	March 16, 2025	BMO Stadium
7	Washington Spirit	0–2	Kansas City Current	19,254	March 22, 2025	Audi Field
8	Orlando Pride	6–0	Chicago Stars FC	19,237	March 14, 2025	Inter&Co Stadium
9	San Diego Wave FC	3–2	Utah Royals	18,465	March 22, 2025	Snapdragon Stadium
9	Angel City FC	0–4	Gotham FC	18,465	April 18, 2025	BMO Stadium
11	Portland Thorns FC	1–1	San Diego Wave FC	18,443	September 20, 2025	Providence Park
12	Portland Thorns FC	1–0	Orlando Pride	17,776	May 3, 2025	Providence Park

Updated through September 20, 2025

* NWSL attendance record for a standalone (non-doubleheader) game.

^{†} Doubleheader match with Major League Soccer team; not included in ranking.

== Statistical leaders ==
As of November 2, 2025.

=== Top scorers ===
Rank	Player	Club	Goals
1	(Malawi) Temwa Chawinga	Kansas City Current	15
2	(Spain) Esther González	Gotham FC	13
3	(Japan) Manaka Matsukubo	North Carolina Courage	11
4	(Brazil) Ludmila	Chicago Stars FC	10
4	(United States) Emma Sears	Racing Louisville FC	10
6	(Zambia) Barbra Banda	Orlando Pride	8
6	(Brazil) Debinha	Kansas City Current	8
6	(Nigeria) Gift Monday	Washington Spirit	8
6	(United States) Olivia Moultrie	Portland Thorns FC	8
6	(United States) Riley Tiernan	Angel City FC	8

=== Top assists ===
Rank	Player	Club	Assists
1	(France) Delphine Cascarino	San Diego Wave FC	6
1	(United States) Izzy Rodriguez	Kansas City Current	6
3	(Canada) Jessie Fleming	Portland Thorns FC	5
3	(United States) Hailie Mace	Kansas City Current	5
3	(United States) Alyssa Malonson	Bay FC	5
3	(United States) Ally Schlegel	Chicago Stars FC	5
3	(United States) Sarah Schupansky	Gotham FC	5
3	(Canada) Janine Sonis	Racing Louisville FC	5
3	(United States) Gisele Thompson	Angel City FC	5
10	8 players tied		4

=== Clean sheets ===
Rank	Player	Club	Clean sheets
1	(Brazil) Lorena	Kansas City Current	14
2	(Germany) Ann-Katrin Berger	Gotham FC	10
3	(United States) Aubrey Kingsbury	Washington Spirit	8
4	(United States) Claudia Dickey	Seattle Reign FC	7
4	(England) Anna Moorhouse	Orlando Pride	7
6	(United States) Jordyn Bloomer	Racing Louisville FC	5
6	(United States) Mandy McGlynn	Utah Royals	5
6	(Canada) Kailen Sheridan	San Diego Wave FC	5
9	(Australia) Mackenzie Arnold	Portland Thorns FC	4
9	(United States) Jane Campbell	Houston Dash	4
9	(United States) Casey Murphy	North Carolina Courage	4
9	(United States) Jordan Silkowitz	Bay FC	4

=== Hat-tricks ===
Player	For	Against	Score	Date	Ref.
(Zambia) Barbra Banda	Orlando Pride	vs. Utah Royals	3–1	May 23, 2025	
(Brazil) Ludmila	Chicago Stars FC	vs. North Carolina Courage	3–3	August 22, 2025	
(Nigeria) Gift Monday	Washington Spirit	vs. Houston Dash	4–0	September 28, 2025	
(Japan) Manaka Matsukubo	North Carolina Courage	vs. Bay FC	4–1	October 17, 2025	

== Playoffs ==
=== Bracket ===
Quarterfinals
1	Kansas City Current	1
8	Gotham FC (a.e.t.)	2
4	Orlando Pride	2
5	Seattle Reign FC	0
2	Washington Spirit (p)	1 (3)
7	Racing Louisville FC	1 (1)
3	Portland Thorns FC (a.e.t.)	1
6	San Diego Wave FC	0

Semifinals
8	Gotham FC	1
4	Orlando Pride	0
2	Washington Spirit	2
3	Portland Thorns FC	0

Championship
8	Gotham FC	1
2	Washington Spirit	0

=== Quarterfinals ===
November 7, 2025
8:00 pm EST

Orlando Pride	2–0	Seattle Reign FC
McCutcheon 21'; Luana 90+8' (pen.)	Report

Inter&Co Stadium, Orlando, Florida
Attendance: 11,355
Referee: Abdou Ndiaye
November 8, 2025
12:00 pm EST

Washington Spirit	1–1 (a.e.t.)	Racing Louisville FC
Monday 73'	Report	Fischer 90+2'
Penalties
Bernal (penalty scored); Morgan (penalty scored); Hershfelt (penalty scored)	3–1	(penalty scored) Balcer; (penalty missed) Jean; (penalty missed) DiGrande; (penalty missed) Borges

Audi Field, Washington, District of Columbia
Attendance: 19,215
Referee: Nabil Bensalah
November 9, 2025
12:30 pm EST

Kansas City Current	1–2 (a.e.t.)	Gotham FC
Wheeler 90+6'	Report	Shaw 68'; Stengel 120+1'

CPKC Stadium, Kansas City, Missouri
Attendance: 11,500
Referee: Elijio Arreguin
November 9, 2025
3:00 pm EST

Portland Thorns FC	1–0 (a.e.t.)	San Diego Wave FC
Turner 94'	Report

Providence Park, Portland, Oregon
Attendance: 19,303
Referee: Thomas Snyder

=== Semifinals ===
November 15, 2025
12:00 pm EST

Washington Spirit	2–0	Portland Thorns FC
Monday 27'; Bethune 83'	Report

Audi Field, Washington, District of Columbia
Attendance: 19,365
Referee: Brad Jensen
November 16, 2025
3:00 pm EST

Orlando Pride	0–1	Gotham FC
	Report	Shaw 90+7'

Inter&Co Stadium, Orlando, Florida
Attendance: 15,714
Referee: Alyssa Pennington

=== Championship ===
November 22, 2025
5:00 PST

Washington Spirit	0–1	Gotham FC
	Report	Lavelle 80'

PayPal Park, San Jose, California
Attendance: 18,000
Referee: Natalie Simon (Florida)

== Challenge Cup ==
March 7, 2025
8:00 pm EDT

Orlando Pride	1–1	Washington Spirit
Souza 41'	Report	Santos 72'
Penalties
Doyle (penalty scored); Angelina (penalty scored); Yates (penalty missed); Lemos (penalty missed)	2–4	(penalty scored) Hatch; (penalty scored) Bernal; (penalty scored) Miura; (penalty scored) McKeown

Inter&Co Stadium, Orlando, Florida
Attendance: 8,880
Referee: Alex Billeter

== Individual awards ==
As of November 20, 2025

=== Annual awards ===
Award	Winner		Nominees	Ref.
Golden Boot	(Malawi) Temwa Chawinga	Kansas City Current	N/A	
Most Valuable Player	(Malawi) Temwa Chawinga	Kansas City Current	(France) Delphine Cascarino, San Diego Wave (Spain) Esther González, Gotham FC (Japan) Manaka Matsukubo, North Carolina Courage (Brazil) Bia Zaneratto, Kansas City Current	
Defender of the Year	(United States) Tara McKeown	Washington Spirit	(United States) Jordyn Bugg, Seattle Reign (United States) Avery Patterson, Houston Dash (United States) Izzy Rodriguez, Kansas City Current (United States) Kayla Sharples, Kansas City Current	
Midfielder of the Year	(Japan) Manaka Matsukubo	North Carolina Courage	(France) Kenza Dali, San Diego Wave (Brazil) Debinha, Kansas City Current (United States) Claire Hutton, Kansas City Current (United States) Olivia Moultrie, Portland Thorns	
Goalkeeper of the Year	(Brazil) Lorena	Kansas City Current	(Germany) Ann-Katrin Berger, Gotham FC (United States) Claudia Dickey, Seattle Reign	
Rookie of the Year	(United States) Lilly Reale	Gotham FC	(United States) Maddie Dahlien, Seattle Reign (United States) Riley Tiernan, Angel City FC	
Coach of the Year	(United States) Beverly Yanez	Racing Louisville FC	Vlatko Andonovski, Kansas City Current (Spain) Adrian Gonzalez, Washington Spirit	

==== Teams of the Year ====
Announced November 19, 2025

Best XI

POSITION	PLAYER	CLUB
GK	(Brazil) Lorena	Kansas City Current
DF	(United States) Tara McKeown	Washington Spirit
DF	(United States) Avery Patterson	Houston Dash
DF	(United States) Izzy Rodriguez	Kansas City Current
DF	(United States) Kayla Sharples	Kansas City Current
MF/FW	(Malawi) Temwa Chawinga	Kansas City Current
MF/FW	(United States) Sam Coffey	Portland Thorns
MF/FW	(Spain) Esther González	Gotham FC
MF/FW	(United States) Claire Hutton	Kansas City Current
MF/FW	(Japan) Manaka Matsukubo	North Carolina Courage
MF/FW	(United States) Olivia Moultrie	Portland Thorns FC

Second XI

POSITION	PLAYER	CLUB
GK	(United States) Claudia Dickey	Seattle Reign
DF	(United States) Jordyn Bugg	Seattle Reign
DF	(United States) Hailie Mace	Kansas City Current
DF	(United States) Lilly Reale	Gotham FC
DF	(United States) Emily Sonnett	Gotham FC
MF/FW	(United States) Croix Bethune	Washington Spirit
MF/FW	(France) Delphine Cascarino	San Diego Wave
MF/FW	(France) Kenza Dali	San Diego Wave
MF/FW	(United States) Taylor Flint	Racing Louisville FC
MF/FW	(United States) Emma Sears	Racing Louisville FC
MF/FW	(Brazil) Bia Zaneratto	Kansas City Current

=== Monthly awards ===
As of November 7, 2025

==== Player of the Month ====
Month	Player	Team	Ref.
March	(Malawi) Temwa Chawinga	Kansas City Current	
April	(Spain) Esther González	Gotham FC	
May	(Malawi) Temwa Chawinga (2)	Kansas City Current	
June	(Spain) Esther González (2)	Gotham FC	
August	(Brazil) Ludmila	Chicago Stars FC	
September	(United States) Trinity Rodman	Washington Spirit	
October/November	(Japan) Manaka Matsukubo	North Carolina Courage	

==== Rookie of the Month ====
Month	Player	Team	Ref.
March	(United States) Maggie Graham	Houston Dash	
April	(United States) Riley Tiernan	Angel City FC	
May	(United States) Riley Tiernan (2)	Angel City FC	
June	(United States) Pietra Tordin	Portland Thorns FC	
August	(United States) Pietra Tordin (2)	Portland Thorns FC	
September	(Nigeria) Deborah Abiodun	Washington Spirit	
October/November	(United States) Taylor Huff	Bay FC	

==== Coach of the Month ====
Month	Player	Team	Ref.
March	No award		
April	No award		
May	(Sweden) Jonas Eidevall	San Diego Wave FC	
June	(North Macedonia) Vlatko Andonovski	Kansas City Current	
August	(North Macedonia) Vlatko Andonovski (2)	Kansas City Current	
September	(North Macedonia) Vlatko Andonovski (3)	Kansas City Current	
October/November	(United States) Bev Yanez	Racing Louisville FC	

==== Team of the Month ====
Month	Goalkeeper	Defenders	Midfielders	Forwards	Ref.
March	(Brazil) Lorena, KC	(United States) Kerry Abello, ORL; (United States) Jordyn Bugg, SEA; (United States) Alana Cook, KC; (United States) Ryan Williams, NC	(Germany) Gia Corley, SD; (Brazil) Debinha, KC; (United States) Lo'eau LaBonta, KC	(Zambia) Barbra Banda, ORL; (Malawi) Temwa Chawinga, KC; (United States) Ashley Hatch, WAS	
April	(United States) Aubrey Kingsbury, WAS	(United States) Lilly Reale, GFC; (United States) Izzy Rodriguez, KC; (United States) Emily Sonnett, GFC; (United States) Ryan Williams, NC; (2)	(France) Kenza Dali, SD; (Brazil) Debinha, KC (2); (United States) Lo'eau LaBonta, KC; (2)	(Zambia) Barbra Banda, ORL (2); (France) Delphine Cascarino, SD; (Spain) Esther González, GFC	
May	(United States) Claudia Dickey, SEA	(United States) Trinity Armstrong, SD; (United States) Casey Krueger, WAS; (United States) Hailie Mace, KC; (United States) Gisele Thompson, LA	(United States) Sam Coffey, POR; (United States) Taylor Flint, LOU; (Japan) Manaka Matsukubo, NC	(Zambia) Barbra Banda, ORL (3); (Malawi) Temwa Chawinga, KC (2); (United States) Riley Tiernan, LA	
June	(Brazil) Lorena, KC (2)	(United States) Jordyn Bugg, SEA (2); (United States) Caprice Dydasco, BAY; (United States) Courtney Petersen, LOU; (United States) Kayla Sharples, KC	(United States) Sam Coffey, POR (2); (France) Kenza Dali, SD (2); (Japan) Manaka Matsukubo, NC (2)	(United States) Emeri Adames, SEA; (Malawi) Temwa Chawinga, KC (3); (Spain) Esther González, GFC (2)	
August	(United States) Jordyn Bloomer, LOU	(United States) Sofia Huerta, SEA; (United States) Izzy Rodriguez, KC (2); (United States) Kayla Sharples, KC (2); (United States) Sam Staab, CHI	(France) Kenza Dali, SD (3); (Wales) Jess Fishlock, SEA; (United States) Taylor Flint, LOU (2)	(Malawi) Temwa Chawinga, KC (4); (Spain) Esther González, GFC (3); (Brazil) Ludmila, CHI	
September	(United States) Aubrey Kingsbury, WAS (2)	(United States) Caprice Dydasco, BAY (2); (United States) Carson Pickett, ORL; (United States) Kayla Sharples, KC (3); (Denmark) Janni Thomsen, UTA	(United States) Croix Bethune, WAS; (France) Kenza Dali, SD (4); (United States) Rose Lavelle, GFC	(Malawi) Temwa Chawinga, KC (5); (United States) Paige Monaghan, UTA; (United States) Trinity Rodman, WAS	
October/November	(Australia) Mackenzie Arnold, POR	(United States) Sofia Huerta, SEA (2); (United States) Izzy Rodriguez, KC (3); (Canada) Janine Sonis, LOU; (United States) Sam Staab, CHI; (2)	(United States) Rose Lavelle, GFC (2); (Japan) Manaka Matsukubo, NC (3); (United States) Olivia Moultrie, POR	(Brazil) Dudinha, SD; (United States) Emma Sears, LOU; (Japan) Mina Tanaka, UTA	

=== Weekly awards ===
Week	Player of the Week		Save of the Week		Ref.
Week	Player	Club	Player	Club	Ref.
1	(Zambia) Barbra Banda	Orlando Pride	(Canada) Kailen Sheridan	San Diego Wave FC	
2	(Germany) Gia Corley	San Diego Wave FC	(Brazil) Lorena	Kansas City Current	
3	(United States) Ashley Hatch	Washington Spirit	(Australia) Mackenzie Arnold	Portland Thorns FC	
4	(United States) Alyssa Thompson	Angel City FC	(United States) Jordan Silkowitz	Bay FC	
5	(France) Delphine Cascarino	San Diego Wave FC	(Canada) Kailen Sheridan (2)	San Diego Wave FC	
6	(Spain) Esther González	Gotham FC	(Brazil) Lorena (2)	Kansas City Current	
7	(United States) Riley Tiernan	Angel City FC	(United States) Jordyn Bloomer	Racing Louisville FC	
8	(Brazil) Debinha	Kansas City Current	(United States) Aubrey Kingsbury	Washington Spirit	
9	(Japan) Manaka Matsukubo	North Carolina Courage	(United States) Mandy McGlynn	Utah Royals	
10	(Canada) Adriana Leon	San Diego Wave FC	(United States) Mandy McGlynn (2)	Utah Royals	
11	(United States) Brittany Ratcliffe	Washington Spirit	(United States) Claudia Dickey	Seattle Reign FC	
12	(Canada) Jessie Fleming	Portland Thorns FC	(Germany) Ann-Katrin Berger	Gotham FC	
13	(United States) Aubrey Kingsbury	Washington Spirit	(Brazil) Lorena (3)	Kansas City Current	
14	(United States) Croix Bethune	Washington Spirit	(United States) Aubrey Kingsbury (2)	Washington Spirit	
15	(United States) Jordyn Bloomer	Racing Louisville FC	(United States) Jordyn Bloomer (2)	Racing Louisville FC	
16	(Canada) Jordyn Huitema	Seattle Reign FC	(United States) Aubrey Kingsbury (3)	Washington Spirit	
17	(Brazil) Ludmila	Chicago Stars FC	(United States) Hannah Seabert	Angel City FC	
18	(United States) Riley Tiernan (2)	Angel City FC	(United States) Aubrey Kingsbury (4)	Washington Spirit	
19	(United States) Trinity Rodman	Washington Spirit	(United States) Jordan Silkowitz (2)	Bay FC	
20	(United States) Tara McKeown	Washington Spirit	(United States) Jordan Silkowitz (3)	Bay FC	
21	(Colombia) Leicy Santos	Washington Spirit	(United States) Alyssa Naeher	Chicago Stars FC	
22	(Nigeria) Gift Monday	Washington Spirit	(United States) Mia Justus	Utah Royals	
23	(Ivory Coast) Rosemonde Kouassi	Washington Spirit	(Australia) Mackenzie Arnold (2)	Portland Thorns FC	
24	(United States) Kennedy Fuller	Angel City FC	(United States) Alyssa Naeher (2)	Chicago Stars FC	
25	(Japan) Manaka Matsukubo (2)	North Carolina Courage	(United States) Shelby Hogan	Gotham FC	
26	(Canada) Jessie Fleming (2)	Portland Thorns FC	(United States) Alyssa Naeher (3)	Chicago Stars FC	

Week	Goal of the Week		Assist of the Week		Ref.
Week	Player	Club	Player	Club	Ref.
1	(United States) Kiki Pickett	Bay FC	(United States) Mandy McGlynn	Utah Royals	
2	(United States) Jordyn Bugg	Seattle Reign FC	(United States) Ally Sentnor	Utah Royals	
3	(United States) Alyssa Thompson	Angel City FC	(United States) Kennedy Fuller	Angel City FC	
4	(Colombia) Leicy Santos	Washington Spirit	(United States) Jameese Joseph	Chicago Red Stars	
5	(United States) Kiki Pickett (2)	Bay FC	(France) Delphine Cascarino	San Diego Wave FC	
6	(United States) Reilyn Turner	Portland Thorns FC	(United States) Jayden Perry	Portland Thorns FC	
7	(United States) Gisele Thompson	Angel City FC	(United States) Alyssa Thompson	Angel City FC	
8	(United States) Christen Press	Angel City FC	(United States) Tara McKeown	Washington Spirit	
9	(United States) Casey Krueger	Washington Spirit	(United States) Tara McKeown (2)	Washington Spirit	
10	(Canada) Adriana Leon	San Diego Wave FC	(Brazil) Bia Zaneratto	Kansas City Current	
11	(United States) Emma Sears	Racing Louisville FC	(United States) Casey Krueger	Washington Spirit	
12	(Brazil) Ludmila	Chicago Stars FC	(United States) Gisele Thompson	Angel City FC	
13	(Brazil) Geyse	Gotham FC	(United States) Nealy Martin	Gotham FC	
14	(United States) Trinity Rodman	Washington Spirit	(United States) Croix Bethune	Washington Spirit	
15	(Jamaica) Kiki Van Zanten	Houston Dash	(Iceland) Sveindís Jane Jónsdóttir	Angel City FC	
16	(United States) Alyssa Naeher	Chicago Stars FC	(United States) Taylor Malham	Chicago Stars FC	
17	(Brazil) Ludmila (2)	Chicago Stars FC	(United States) Sofia Huerta	Seattle Reign FC	
18	(United States) Riley Tiernan	Angel City FC	(United States) Rose Lavelle	Gotham FC	
19	(United States) Trinity Rodman (2)	Washington Spirit	(Colombia) Leicy Santos	Washington Spirit	
20	(United States) Olivia Moultrie	Portland Thorns FC	(United States) Jaelin Howell	Gotham FC	
21	(Japan) Mina Tanaka	Utah Royals	(United States) Gisele Thompson (2)	Angel City FC	
22	(Italy) Sofia Cantore	Washington Spirit	(United States) Rose Lavelle (2)	Gotham FC	
23	(Ivory Coast) Rosemonde Kouassi	Washington Spirit	(Nigeria) Deborah Abiodun	Washington Spirit	
24	(United States) Trinity Rodman (3)	Washington Spirit	(Japan) Jun Endo	Angel City FC	
25	(Italy) Sofia Cantore (2)	Washington Spirit	(United States) Tyler Lussi	North Carolina Courage	
26	(Venezuela) Deyna Castellanos	Portland Thorns FC	(United States) Katie O'Kane	Racing Louisville FC	
