= NWSL Save of the Week =

Weekly soccer award for the National Women's Soccer League (NWSL)

The National Women's Soccer League Save of the Week is a weekly soccer award given to individual players in the National Women's Soccer League since 2016. The honor is awarded by popular social media vote to the player deemed to have scored the best save over the past week.

== Winners ==
=== 2016 ===
Week	Player	Team	Ref.
1	(United States) Michelle Betos	Portland Thorns FC	
2	(United States) Ashlyn Harris	Orlando Pride	
3	(United States) Ashlyn Harris (2)	Orlando Pride	
4	(United States) Ashlyn Harris (3)	Orlando Pride	
5	(Australia) Lydia Williams	Houston Dash	
6	(United States) Ashlyn Harris (4)	Orlando Pride	
7	(United States) Katherine Reynolds (Note: Nominated or won as a field player.)	Portland Thorns FC	
8	(United States) Ashlyn Harris (5)	Orlando Pride	
9	(United States) Ashlyn Harris (6)	Orlando Pride	
10	(United States) Ashlyn Harris (7)	Orlando Pride	
11	(United States) Nicole Barnhart	FC Kansas City	
12	(United States) Michelle Betos (2)	Portland Thorns FC	
13	(United States) Michelle Betos (3)	Portland Thorns FC	
14	(United States) Kendall Fletcher	Seattle Reign FC (Note: Seattle Reign FC was previously known as Reign FC and OL Reign.)	
15	(United States) Michelle Betos (4)	Portland Thorns FC	
16	(United States) Alyssa Naeher	Chicago Red Stars	
17	(United States) Alyssa Naeher (2)	Chicago Red Stars	
18	(United States) Ashlyn Harris (8)	Orlando Pride	
19	(Australia) Lydia Williams (2)	Houston Dash	

=== 2017 ===
Week	Player	Team	Ref.
1	(United States) Ashlyn Harris	Orlando Pride	
2	(Brazil) Mônica	Orlando Pride	
3	(United States) Adrianna Franch	Portland Thorns FC	
4	(United States) Ashlyn Harris (2)	Orlando Pride	
5	(United States) Alyssa Naeher	Chicago Red Stars	
6	(United States) Abby Smith	Boston Breakers	
7	(United States) Danielle Colaprico	Chicago Red Stars	
8	(United States) Adrianna Franch (2)	Portland Thorns FC	
9	(United States) Aubrey Bledsoe (Note: Aubrey Kingsbury, née Aubrey Bledsoe.)	Orlando Pride	
10	(Australia) Steph Catley	Orlando Pride	
11	(Canada) Stephanie Labbé	Washington Spirit	
12	(United States) Aubrey Bledsoe (2)	Orlando Pride	
13	(United States) Aubrey Bledsoe (3)	Orlando Pride	
14	(United States) Alyssa Naeher (2)	Chicago Red Stars	
15	(United States) Adrianna Franch (3)	Portland Thorns FC	
16	(United States) Adrianna Franch (4)	Portland Thorns FC	
17	(United States) Ashlyn Harris (3)	Orlando Pride	
18	(United States) Ashlyn Harris (4)	Orlando Pride	
19	(United States) Jane Campbell	Houston Dash	
20	(Bosnia and Herzegovina) DiDi Haračić	Washington Spirit	
20	(United States) Whitney Church	Washington Spirit	
21	(United States) Ashlyn Harris (5)	Orlando Pride	
21	(Brazil) Mônica (2)	Orlando Pride	
22	(United States) Ashlyn Harris (6)	Orlando Pride	

=== 2018 ===
Week	Player	Team	Ref.
1	(United States) Adrianna Franch	Portland Thorns FC	
2	(United States) Jane Campbell	Houston Dash	
3	(United States) Ashlyn Harris	Orlando Pride	
4	(United States) Aubrey Bledsoe	Washington Spirit	
5	(United States) Aubrey Bledsoe (2)	Washington Spirit	
6	(United States) Alyssa Naeher	Chicago Red Stars	
7	(United States) Ashlyn Harris (2)	Orlando Pride	
8	(United States) Katelyn Rowland	North Carolina Courage	
9	(United States) Ashlyn Harris (3)	Orlando Pride	
10	(United States) Haley Kopmeyer	Orlando Pride	
11/12	(United States) Britt Eckerstrom	Portland Thorns FC	
13	(United States) Ashlyn Harris (4)	Orlando Pride	
14	(United States) Adrianna Franch (2)	Portland Thorns FC	
15	(United States) Adrianna Franch (3)	Portland Thorns FC	
16	(Scotland) Rachel Corsie	Utah Royals FC	
17	(Scotland) Rachel Corsie (2)	Utah Royals FC	
18	No award		
19	(United States) Ashlyn Harris (5)	Orlando Pride	
20	(United States) Adrianna Franch (4)	Portland Thorns FC	
21	(United States) Ashlyn Harris (6)	Orlando Pride	
22	(United States) Ashlyn Harris (7)	Orlando Pride	
23	No award		
24	(United States) Nicole Barnhart	Utah Royals FC	

=== 2019 ===
Week	Honor	Player	Team	Ref.
1	Winner	(United States) Ashlyn Harris	Orlando Pride	(Note: National Women's Soccer League [@NWSL] (April 16, 2019). "Save of the Week : Ashlyn Harris" (Tweet) – via Twitter.)
1	Nominees	(United States) Alyssa Naeher	Chicago Red Stars	(Note: National Women's Soccer League [@NWSL] (April 16, 2019). "Save of the Week : Ashlyn Harris" (Tweet) – via Twitter.)
1	Nominees	(United States) Jane Campbell	Houston Dash	(Note: National Women's Soccer League [@NWSL] (April 16, 2019). "Save of the Week : Ashlyn Harris" (Tweet) – via Twitter.)
1	Nominees	(United States) Michelle Betos	Reign FC	(Note: National Women's Soccer League [@NWSL] (April 16, 2019). "Save of the Week : Ashlyn Harris" (Tweet) – via Twitter.)
2	Winner	(Canada) Kailen Sheridan	Sky Blue FC (Note: NJ/NY Gotham FC was previously known as Sky Blue FC.)	
2	Nominees	(United States) Alyssa Naeher	Chicago Red Stars	
2	Nominees	(United States) Ashlyn Harris	Orlando Pride	
2	Nominees	(United States) Michelle Betos	Reign FC	
3	Winner	(Canada) Kailen Sheridan (2)	Sky Blue FC	
3	Nominees	(United States) Nicole Barnhart	Utah Royals FC	
3	Nominees	(Australia) Lydia Williams	Reign FC	
3	Nominees	(United States) Jane Campbell	Houston Dash	
4	Winner	(United States) Aubrey Bledsoe	Washington Spirit	
4	Nominees	(United States) Nicole Barnhart	Utah Royals FC	
4	Nominees	(Canada) Kailen Sheridan	Sky Blue FC	
4	Nominees	(United States) Merritt Mathias	North Carolina Courage	
5	Winner	(United States) Haley Kopmeyer	Orlando Pride	
5	Nominees	(Bosnia and Herzegovina) DiDi Haračić	Sky Blue FC	
5	Nominees	(United States) Britt Eckerstrom	Portland Thorns FC	
5	Nominees	(United States) Emily Boyd	Chicago Red Stars	
6	Winner	(United States) Britt Eckerstrom	Portland Thorns FC	
6	Honorary winner	(United States) Morgan Andrews (Note: Nominated or won as a field player substituting in goal.)	Reign FC	
6	Nominees	(Bosnia and Herzegovina) DiDi Haračić	Sky Blue FC	
6	Nominees	(United States) Michelle Betos	Reign FC	
6	Nominees	(United States) Emily Boyd	Chicago Red Stars	
7	Winner	(United States) Paige Nielsen	Washington Spirit	
7	Nominees	(Bosnia and Herzegovina) DiDi Haračić	Sky Blue FC	
7	Nominees	(United States) Nicole Barnhart	Utah Royals FC	
7	Nominees	(United States) Merritt Mathias	North Carolina Courage	
8	Winner	(United States) Jane Campbell	Houston Dash	
8	Nominees	(United States) Aubrey Bledsoe	Washington Spirit	
8	Nominees	(United States) Haley Kopmeyer	Orlando Pride	
9	Winner	(United States) Haley Kopmeyer (2)	Orlando Pride	
9	Nominees	(Bosnia and Herzegovina) DiDi Haračić	Sky Blue FC	
9	Nominees	(United States) Casey Murphy	Reign FC	
9	Nominees	(United States) Aubrey Bledsoe	Washington Spirit	
10	Winner	(United States) Haley Kopmeyer (3)	Orlando Pride	
10	Nominees	(United States) Nicole Barnhart	Utah Royals FC	
10	Nominees	(Bosnia and Herzegovina) DiDi Haračić	Sky Blue FC	
10	Nominees	(United States) Casey Murphy	Reign FC	
11	Winner	(United States) Haley Kopmeyer (4)	Orlando Pride	
11	Nominees	(United States) Katelyn Rowland	North Carolina Courage	
11	Nominees	(United States) Emily Boyd	Chicago Red Stars	
11	Nominees	(United States) Casey Murphy	Reign FC	
12	Winner	(United States) Aubrey Bledsoe (2)	Washington Spirit	
12	Nominees	(United States) Casey Murphy	Reign FC	
12	Nominees	(Canada) Kailen Sheridan	Sky Blue FC	
12	Nominees	(United States) Haley Kopmeyer	Orlando Pride	
12	Winner	(United States) Haley Kopmeyer (5)	Orlando Pride	
12	Nominees	(United States) Casey Murphy	Reign FC	
12	Nominees	(United States) Nicole Barnhart	Utah Royals FC	
14	Winner	(United States) Adrianna Franch	Portland Thorns FC	
14	Nominees	(Canada) Kailen Sheridan	Sky Blue FC	
14	Nominees	(United States) Jane Campbell	Houston Dash	
14	Nominees	(United States) Alyssa Naeher	Chicago Red Stars	
15	Winner	(United States) Jane Campbell (2)	Houston Dash	
15	Nominees	(Canada) Kailen Sheridan	Sky Blue FC	
15	Nominees	(United States) Alyssa Naeher	Chicago Red Stars	
15	Nominees	(United States) Casey Murphy	Reign FC	
16	Winner	(United States) Aubrey Bledsoe (3)	Washington Spirit	
16	Nominees	(Canada) Stephanie Labbé	North Carolina Courage	
16	Nominees	(United States) Nicole Barnhart	Utah Royals FC	
16	Nominees	(Canada) Kailen Sheridan	Sky Blue FC	
17	Winner	(United States) Adrianna Franch (2)	Portland Thorns FC	
17	Nominees	(Canada) Kailen Sheridan	Sky Blue FC	
17	Nominees	(Canada) Stephanie Labbé	North Carolina Courage	
17	Nominees	(United States) Casey Murphy	Reign FC	
18	Winner	(Canada) Kailen Sheridan (3)	Sky Blue FC	
18	Nominees	(United States) Aubrey Bledsoe	Washington Spirit	
18	Nominees	(United States) Adrianna Franch	Portland Thorns FC	
18	Nominees	(United States) Casey Murphy	Reign FC	
19	Winner	(United States) Ashlyn Harris (2)	Orlando Pride	
19	Nominees	(United States) Casey Murphy	Reign FC	
19	Nominees	(United States) Aubrey Bledsoe	Washington Spirit	
19	Nominees	(United States) Jane Campbell	Houston Dash	
20	Winner	(United States) Lainey Burdett	Orlando Pride	
20	Nominees	(United States) Shae Yáñez	Washington Spirit	
21	Winner	(United States) Nicole Barnhart	Utah Royals FC	
21	Nominees	(Canada) Kailen Sheridan	Sky Blue FC	
21	Nominees	(United States) Alyssa Naeher	Chicago Red Stars	
21	Nominees	(United States) Jane Campbell	Houston Dash	
22	Winner	(United States) Ashlyn Harris (3)	Orlando Pride	
22	Nominees	(United States) Jane Campbell	Houston Dash	
22	Nominees	(United States) Casey Murphy	Reign FC	
22	Nominees	(United States) Alyssa Naeher	Chicago Red Stars	
23	Winner	(United States) Alyssa Naeher	Chicago Red Stars	
23	Nominees	(United States) Jane Campbell	Houston Dash	
23	Nominees	(Canada) Stephanie Labbé	North Carolina Courage	
23	Nominees	(Canada) Kailen Sheridan	Sky Blue FC	
24	Winner	(United States) Ashlyn Harris (4)	Orlando Pride	
24	Nominees	(United States) Jane Campbell	Houston Dash	
24	Nominees	(United States) Nicole Barnhart	Utah Royals FC	
24	Nominees	(United States) Paige Nielsen	Washington Spirit	
25	Winner	(United States) Casey Murphy	Reign FC	
25	Nominees	(Canada) Kailen Sheridan	Sky Blue FC	
25	Nominees	(United States) Jane Campbell	Houston Dash	
25	Nominees	(United States) Aubrey Bledsoe	Washington Spirit	

=== 2021 ===
Week	Honor	Player	Team	Ref.
1	Winner	(United States) Ashlyn Harris	Orlando Pride	
1	Nominees	(England) Karen Bardsley	OL Reign	
1	Nominees	(United States) Casey Murphy	North Carolina Courage	
1	Nominees	(United States) Michelle Betos	Racing Louisville FC	
2	Winner	(Canada) Erin McLeod	Orlando Pride	
2	Nominees	(Canada) Kailen Sheridan	NJ/NY Gotham FC	
2	Nominees	(United States) Casey Murphy	North Carolina Courage	
2	Nominees	(England) Karen Bardsley	OL Reign	
3	Winner	(Canada) Kailen Sheridan	NJ/NY Gotham FC	
3	Nominees	None		
4	Winner	(United States) Ashlyn Harris (2)	Orlando Pride	
4	Nominees	(United States) Michelle Betos	Racing Louisville FC	
4	Nominees	(United States) Casey Murphy	North Carolina Courage	
4	Nominees	(United States) Jane Campbell	Houston Dash	
5	Winner	(United States) Abby Smith	Kansas City NWSL (Note: Kansas City Current was previously known as Kansas City NWSL.)	
5	Nominees	(United States) Michelle Betos	Racing Louisville FC	
5	Nominees	(United States) Casey Murphy	North Carolina Courage	
5	Nominees	(United States) Alyssa Naeher	Chicago Red Stars	
6	Winner	(United States) Michelle Betos	Racing Louisville FC	
6	Nominees	(Canada) Kailen Sheridan	NJ/NY Gotham FC	
6	Nominees	(United States) Casey Murphy	North Carolina Courage	
6	Nominees	(United States) Alyssa Naeher	Chicago Red Stars	
7	Winner	(United States) Ashlyn Harris (3)	Orlando Pride	
7	Nominees	(United States) Aubrey Bledsoe	Washington Spirit	
7	Nominees	(United States) Nicole Barnhart	Kansas City NWSL	
7	Nominees	(United States) Jane Campbell	Houston Dash	
8	Winner	(Bosnia and Herzegovina) DiDi Haračić	NJ/NY Gotham FC	
8	Nominees	(United States) Aubrey Bledsoe	Washington Spirit	
8	Nominees	(United States) Nicole Barnhart	Kansas City NWSL	
8	Nominees	(United States) Casey Murphy	North Carolina Courage	
9	Winner	(United States) Ashlyn Harris (4)	Orlando Pride	
9	Nominees	(United States) Aubrey Bledsoe	Washington Spirit	
9	Nominees	(Bosnia and Herzegovina) DiDi Haračić	NJ/NY Gotham FC	
9	Nominees	(United States) Cassie Miller	Chicago Red Stars	
10	Winner	(United States) Ashlyn Harris (5)	Orlando Pride	
10	Nominees	(United States) Aubrey Bledsoe	Washington Spirit	
10	Nominees	(United States) Kristen Edmonds	Kansas City NWSL	
10	Nominees	(United States) Casey Murphy	North Carolina Courage	
11	Winner	(United States) Bella Bixby	Portland Thorns FC	
11	Nominees	(United States) Lindsey Harris	Houston Dash	
11	Nominees	(United States) Ashlyn Harris	Orlando Pride	
11	Nominees	(Bosnia and Herzegovina) DiDi Haračić	NJ/NY Gotham FC	
12	Winner	(United States) Christen Westphal	Portland Thorns FC	
12	Nominees	(United States) Cassie Miller	Chicago Red Stars	
12	Nominees	(United States) Ashlyn Harris	Orlando Pride	
12	Nominees	(United States) Casey Murphy	North Carolina Courage	
13	Winner	(United States) Ashlyn Harris (6)	Orlando Pride	
13	Nominees	(Canada) Kailen Sheridan	NJ/NY Gotham FC	
13	Nominees	(United States) Bella Bixby	Portland Thorns FC	
13	Nominees	(United States) Casey Murphy	North Carolina Courage	
14	Winner	(France) Sarah Bouhaddi	OL Reign	
14	Nominees	(United States) Katelyn Rowland	Kansas City NWSL	
14	Nominees	(United States) Aubrey Bledsoe	Washington Spirit	
14	Nominees	(United States) Casey Murphy	North Carolina Courage	
15	Winner	(United States) Ashlyn Harris (7)	Orlando Pride	
15	Nominees	(United States) Michelle Betos	Racing Louisville FC	
15	Nominees	(United States) Cassie Miller	Chicago Red Stars	
15	Nominees	(France) Sarah Bouhaddi	OL Reign	
16	Winner	(United States) Ashlyn Harris (8)	Orlando Pride	
16	Nominees	(Canada) Kailen Sheridan	NJ/NY Gotham FC	
16	Nominees	(United States) Adrianna Franch	Kansas City NWSL	
16	Nominees	(United States) Casey Murphy	North Carolina Courage	
17	Winner	(United States) Bella Bixby (2)	Portland Thorns FC	
17	Nominees	(United States) Michelle Betos	Racing Louisville FC	
17	Nominees	(United States) Jane Campbell	Houston Dash	
17	Nominees	(United States) Casey Murphy	North Carolina Courage	
18	Winner	(United States) Ashlyn Harris (9)	Orlando Pride	
18	Nominees	(United States) Michelle Betos	Racing Louisville FC	
18	Nominees	(United States) Aubrey Bledsoe	Washington Spirit	
18	Nominees	(France) Sarah Bouhaddi	OL Reign	
19	No award			
20	Winner	(United States) Ashlyn Harris (10)	Orlando Pride	
20	Nominees	(United States) Michelle Betos	Racing Louisville FC	
20	Nominees	(United States) Jane Campbell	Houston Dash	
20	Nominees	(United States) Adrianna Franch	Kansas City NWSL	
21	Winner	(Wales) Jess Fishlock	OL Reign	
21	Nominees	(Canada) Erin McLeod	Orlando Pride	
21	Nominees	(Canada) Kailen Sheridan	NJ/NY Gotham FC	
21	Nominees	(Canada) Allysha Chapman	Houston Dash	
22	Winner	(Canada) Kailen Sheridan (2)	NJ/NY Gotham FC	
22	Nominees	(United States) Adrianna Franch	Kansas City NWSL	
22	Nominees	(United States) Jane Campbell	Houston Dash	
22	Nominees	(United States) Casey Murphy	North Carolina Courage	

=== 2022 Challenge Cup ===
Week	Honor	Player	Team	Ref.
1	Winner	(Canada) Kailen Sheridan	San Diego Wave FC	
1	Nominees	(England) Gemma Bonner	Racing Louisville FC	
1	Nominees	(Canada) Erin McLeod	Orlando Pride	
1	Nominees	(United States) Ashlyn Harris	NJ/NY Gotham FC	
2	Winner	(United States) Phallon Tullis-Joyce	OL Reign	
2	Nominees	(United States) Katie Lund (Note: Katie Atkinson, née Katie Lund)	Racing Louisville FC	
2	Nominees	(United States) Abby Smith	Portland Thorns FC	
2	Nominees	(Canada) Kailen Sheridan	San Diego Wave FC	
3	Winner	(United States) Phallon Tullis-Joyce (2)	OL Reign	
3	Nominees	(United States) Jane Campbell	Houston Dash	
3	Nominees	(United States) Alyssa Naeher	Chicago Red Stars	
3	Nominees	(Canada) Katelyn Rowland	North Carolina Courage	
4	Winner	(United States) Phallon Tullis-Joyce (3)	OL Reign	
4	Nominees	(United States) Ashlyn Harris	NJ/NY Gotham FC	
4	Nominees	(England) Carly Telford	San Diego Wave FC	
4	Nominees	(United States) Katie Lund	Racing Louisville FC	
5	Winner	(United States) Kristen Edmonds	Kansas City Current	
5	Nominees	(United States) Aubrey Kingsbury	Washington Spirit	
5	Nominees	(Bosnia and Herzegovina) DiDi Haračić	Angel City FC	
5	Nominees	(United States) Bella Bixby	Portland Thorns FC	

=== 2022 NWSL season ===
Week	Honor	Player	Team	Ref.
1	Winner	(Bosnia and Herzegovina) DiDi Haračić	Angel City FC	
1	Nominees	(United States) Aubrey Kingsbury	Washington Spirit	
1	Nominees	(United States) Adrianna Franch	Kansas City Current	
1	Nominees	(United States) Alyssa Naeher	Chicago Red Stars	
2	Winner	(United States) Phallon Tullis-Joyce	OL Reign	
2	Nominees	(United States) Aubrey Kingsbury	Washington Spirit	
2	Nominees	(United States) Adrianna Franch	Kansas City Current	
2	Nominees	(United States) Jane Campbell	Houston Dash	
3	Winner	(United States) Phallon Tullis-Joyce (2)	OL Reign	
3	Nominees	(United States) Adrianna Franch	Kansas City Current	
3	Nominees	(United States) Aubrey Kingsbury	Washington Spirit	
3	Nominees	(Canada) Erin McLeod	Orlando Pride	
4	Winner	(Bosnia and Herzegovina) DiDi Haračić (2)	Angel City FC	
4	Nominees	(United States) Bella Bixby	Portland Thorns FC	
4	Nominees	(United States) Alyssa Naeher	Chicago Red Stars	
4	Nominees	(United States) Katie Lund	Racing Louisville FC	
5	Winner	(United States) Ashlyn Harris	NJ/NY Gotham FC	
5	Nominees	(United States) Adrianna Franch	Kansas City Current	
5	Nominees	(United States) Alyssa Naeher	Chicago Red Stars	
5	Nominees	(United States) Katie Lund	Racing Louisville FC	
6	Winner	(Bosnia and Herzegovina) DiDi Haračić (3)	Angel City FC	
6	Nominees	(United States) Alyssa Naeher	Chicago Red Stars	
6	Nominees	(United States) Adrianna Franch	Kansas City Current	
6	Nominees	(United States) Casey Murphy	North Carolina Courage	
7	Winner	(United States) Jane Campbell	Houston Dash	
7	Nominees	(United States) Phallon Tullis-Joyce	OL Reign	
7	Nominees	(United States) Alyssa Naeher	Chicago Red Stars	
7	Nominees	(Bosnia and Herzegovina) DiDi Haračić	Angel City FC	
8	Winner	(United States) Bella Bixby	Portland Thorns FC	
8	Nominees	(United States) Alyssa Naeher	Chicago Red Stars	
8	Nominees	(Canada) Erin McLeod	Orlando Pride	
8	Nominees	(Bosnia and Herzegovina) DiDi Haračić	Angel City FC	
9	Winner	(United States) Shelby Hogan	Portland Thorns FC	
9	Nominees	(United States) Adrianna Franch	Kansas City Current	
9	Nominees	(Bosnia and Herzegovina) DiDi Haračić	Angel City FC	
9	Nominees	(Canada) Katelyn Rowland	North Carolina Courage	
10	Winner	(United States) Adrianna Franch	Kansas City Current	
10	Nominees	(United States) Ashlyn Harris	NJ/NY Gotham FC	
10	Nominees	(United States) Bella Bixby	Portland Thorns FC	
10	Nominees	(England) Carly Telford	San Diego Wave FC	
11	Winner	(United States) Adrianna Franch (2)	Kansas City Current	
11	Nominees	(England) Carly Telford	San Diego Wave FC	
11	Nominees	(United States) Katie Lund	Racing Louisville FC	
11	Nominees	(Canada) Erin McLeod	Orlando Pride	
12	Winner	(Canada) Kailen Sheridan	San Diego Wave FC	
12	Nominees	(United States) Adrianna Franch	Kansas City Current	
12	Nominees	(United States) Bella Bixby	Portland Thorns FC	
12	Nominees	(Canada) Erin McLeod	Orlando Pride	
13	Winner	(United States) Katie Lund	Racing Louisville FC	
13	Nominees	(Canada) Kailen Sheridan	San Diego Wave FC	
13	Nominees	(United States) Bella Bixby	Portland Thorns FC	
13	Nominees	(Canada) Erin McLeod	Orlando Pride	
14	Winner	(United States) Michelle Betos	NJ/NY Gotham FC	
14	Nominees	(United States) Bella Bixby	Portland Thorns FC	
14	Nominees	(United States) Aubrey Kingsbury	Washington Spirit	
14	Nominees	(United States) Alyssa Naeher	Chicago Red Stars	
15	Winner	(United States) Michelle Betos (2)	NJ/NY Gotham FC	
15	Nominees	(Bosnia and Herzegovina) DiDi Haračić	Angel City FC	
15	Nominees	(Canada) Erin McLeod	Orlando Pride	
15	Nominees	(United States) Casey Murphy	North Carolina Courage	
16	Winner	(United States) Abby Smith	Portland Thorns FC	
16	Nominees	(United States) Alyssa Naeher	Chicago Red Stars	
16	Nominees	(Canada) Erin McLeod	Orlando Pride	
16	Nominees	(United States) Casey Murphy	North Carolina Courage	
17	Winner	(United States) Paige Monaghan	NJ/NY Gotham FC	
17	Nominees	(United States) Alyssa Naeher	Chicago Red Stars	
17	Nominees	(United States) Adrianna Franch	Kansas City Current	
17	Nominees	(Bosnia and Herzegovina) DiDi Haračić	Angel City FC	
18	Winner	(Canada) Kailen Sheridan (2)	San Diego Wave FC	
18	Nominees	(United States) Adrianna Franch	Kansas City Current	
18	Nominees	(Bosnia and Herzegovina) DiDi Haračić	Angel City FC	
18	Nominees	(United States) Michelle Betos	NJ/NY Gotham FC	
19	Winner	(United States) Bella Bixby (2)	Portland Thorns FC	
19	Nominees	(United States) Aubrey Kingsbury	Kansas City Current	
19	Nominees	(United States) Michelle Betos	NJ/NY Gotham FC	
19	Nominees	(Canada) Erin McLeod	Orlando Pride	

=== 2023 ===
Week	Honor	Player	Team	Ref.
1	Not awarded			
2	Not awarded			
3	Not awarded			
4	Winner	(United States) Abby Smith	NJ/NY Gotham FC	
4	Nominees	(United States) Bella Bixby	Portland Thorns FC	
4	Nominees	(United States) Aubrey Kingsbury	Washington Spirit	
4	Nominees	(United States) Katie Lund	Racing Louisville FC	
5	Winner	(United States) Abby Smith (2)	NJ/NY Gotham FC	
5	Nominees	(United States) Phallon Tullis-Joyce	OL Reign	
5	Nominees	(United States) Cassie Miller	Kansas City Current	
5	Nominees	(England) Anna Moorhouse	Orlando Pride	
6	Winner	(United States) Katie Lund	Racing Louisville FC	
6	Nominees	(United States) Bella Bixby	Portland Thorns FC	
6	Nominees	(United States) Mandy Haught (Note: Mandy McGlynn, formerly Mandy Haught.)	NJ/NY Gotham FC	
6	Nominees	(England) Anna Moorhouse	Orlando Pride	
7	Winner	(United States) Abby Smith (3)	NJ/NY Gotham FC	
7	Nominees	(Canada) Kailen Sheridan	San Diego Wave FC	
7	Nominees	(United States) Casey Murphy	North Carolina Courage	
7	Nominees	(United States) Alyssa Naeher	Chicago Red Stars	
8	Winner	(United States) Alyssa Naeher	Chicago Red Stars	
8	Nominees	(United States) Katie Lund	Racing Louisville FC	
8	Nominees	(England) Anna Moorhouse	Orlando Pride	
8	Nominees	(Bosnia and Herzegovina) DiDi Haračić	Angel City FC	
9	Winner	(United States) Alyssa Naeher (2)	Chicago Red Stars	
9	Nominees	(United States) Bella Bixby	Portland Thorns FC	
9	Nominees	(Canada) Kailen Sheridan	San Diego Wave FC	
9	Nominees	(United States) Casey Murphy	North Carolina Courage	
10	Winner	(Brazil) Bruninha and (United States) Abby Smith (4)	NJ/NY Gotham FC	
10	Nominees	(United States) Bella Bixby	Portland Thorns FC	
10	Nominees	(United States) Carson Pickett	Racing Louisville FC	
10	Nominees	(United States) Jane Campbell	Houston Dash	
11	Winner	(United States) Phallon Tullis-Joyce	OL Reign	
11	Nominees	(United States) Abby Smith	NJ/NY Gotham FC	
11	Nominees	(United States) Nicole Barnhart	Washington Spirit	
11	Nominees	(Bosnia and Herzegovina) DiDi Haračić	Angel City FC	
12	Winner	(United States) Phallon Tullis-Joyce (2)	OL Reign	
12	Nominees	(Bosnia and Herzegovina) DiDi Haračić	Angel City FC	
12	Nominees	(United States) Ryanne Brown	OL Reign	
12	Nominees	(England) Anna Moorhouse	Orlando Pride	
13	Winner	(United States) Phallon Tullis-Joyce (3)	OL Reign	
13	Nominees	(United States) Shelby Hogan	Portland Thorns FC	
13	Nominees	(United States) Shae Yáñez	San Diego Wave FC	
13	Nominees	(England) Anna Moorhouse	Orlando Pride	
14	Winner	(United States) Abby Smith (5)	NJ/NY Gotham FC	
14	Nominees	(Bosnia and Herzegovina) DiDi Haračić	Angel City FC	
14	Nominees	(United States) Shae Yáñez	San Diego Wave FC	
14	Nominees	(United States) Cassie Miller	Kansas City Current	
15	Winner	(United States) Abby Smith (6)	NJ/NY Gotham FC	
15	Nominees	(United States) Adrianna Franch	Kansas City Current	
15	Nominees	(United States) Phallon Tullis-Joyce	OL Reign	
15	Nominees	(United States) Katelyn Rowland	North Carolina Courage	
16	Winner	(United States) Adrianna Franch	Kansas City Current	
16	Nominees	(United States) Bella Bixby	Portland Thorns FC	
16	Nominees	(United States) Mandy Haught	NJ/NY Gotham FC	
16	Nominees	(United States) Shae Yañez	San Diego Wave FC	
17	Winner	(United States) Angelina Anderson	Angel City FC	
17	Nominees	(United States) Emily Boyd	Chicago Red Stars	
17	Nominees	(United States) Jane Campbell	Houston Dash	
17	Nominees	(United States) Katie Lund	Racing Louisville FC	
18	Winner	(United States) Abby Smith (7)	NJ/NY Gotham FC	
18	Nominees	(United States) Nicole Barnhart and (United States) Dorian Bailey	Houston Dash	
18	Nominees	(United States) Jane Campbell	Houston Dash	
18	Nominees	(Bosnia and Herzegovina) DiDi Haračić	Angel City FC	
19	Winner	(United States) Adrianna Franch (2)	Kansas City Current	
19	Nominees	(United States) Aubrey Kingsbury	Washington Spirit	
19	Nominees	(United States) Katie Lund	Racing Louisville FC	
19	Nominees	(United States) Shea Yañez	San Diego Wave FC	
20	Winner	(United States) Jane Campbell	Houston Dash	
20	Nominees	(Bosnia and Herzegovina) DiDi Haračić	Angel City FC	
20	Nominees	(United States) Mandy Haught	NJ/NY Gotham FC	
20	Nominees	(Canada) Kailen Sheridan	San Diego Wave FC	
21	Winner	(United States) Angelina Anderson (2)	Angel City FC	
21	Nominees	(United States) Bella Bixby	Portland Thorns FC	
21	Nominees	(United States) Adrianna Franch	Kansas City Current	
21	Nominees	(United States) Carly Nelson	Orlando Pride	
22	Winner	(United States) Adrianna Franch (3)	Kansas City Current	
22	Nominees	(United States) Jane Campbell	Houston Dash	
22	Nominees	(Bosnia and Herzegovina) DiDi Haračić	Angel City FC	
22	Nominees	(United States) Aubrey Kingsbury	Washington Spirit	
23	Winner	(United States) Casey Krueger	Chicago Red Stars	
23	Nominees	(United States) Bella Bixby	Portland Thorns FC	
23	Nominees	(United States) Jane Campbell	Houston Dash	
23	Nominees	(Canada) Kailen Sheridan	San Diego Wave FC	
24	Winner	(United States) Claudia Dickey	OL Reign	
24	Nominees	(United States) Jane Campbell	Houston Dash	
24	Nominees	(United States) Madison Pogarch	San Diego Wave FC	
24	Nominees	(Canada) Kailen Sheridan	San Diego Wave FC	
25	Winner	(United States) Ali Krieger	NJ/NY Gotham FC	
25	Nominees	(United States) Adrianna Franch	Kansas City Current	
25	Nominees	(Canada) Kailen Sheridan	San Diego Wave FC	
25	Nominees	(United States) Arin Wright	Chicago Red Stars	

=== 2024 ===
Week	Honor	Player	Team	Ref.
1	Winner	(United States) Alyssa Naeher	Chicago Red Stars	
1	Nominees	(United States) Adrianna Franch	Kansas City Current	
1	Nominees	(United States) Casey Murphy	North Carolina Courage	
1	Nominees	(Canada) Lysianne Proulx	Bay FC	
2	Winner	(Austria) Sarah Puntigam	Houston Dash	
2	Nominees	(United States) Adrianna Franch	Kansas City Current	
2	Nominees	(United States) Mandy Haught	Utah Royals	
2	Nominees	(Canada) Kailen Sheridan	San Diego Wave FC	
3	Winner	(United States) Aubrey Kingsbury	Washington Spirit	
3	Nominees	(United States) Katie Lund	Racing Louisville FC	
3	Nominees	(United States) Paige Nielsen	Angel City FC	
3	Nominees	(Canada) Lysianne Proulx	Bay FC	
4	Winner	(United States) Tatumn Milazzo	Chicago Red Stars	
4	Nominees	(United States) Adrianna Franch	Kansas City Current	
4	Nominees	(United States) Aubrey Kingsbury	Washington Spirit	
4	Nominees	(Canada) Kailen Sheridan	San Diego Wave FC	
5	Winner	(United States) Tatumn Milazzo (2)	Chicago Red Stars	
5	Nominees	(United States) Mandy Haught	Utah Royals	
5	Nominees	(United States) Cassie Miller	NJ/NY Gotham FC	
5	Nominees	(Canada) Kailen Sheridan	San Diego Wave FC	
6	Winner	(United States) Carson Pickett	Racing Louisville FC	
6	Nominees	(United States) Adrianna Franch	Kansas City Current	
6	Nominees	(Finland) Natalia Kuikka	Chicago Red Stars	
6	Nominees	(United States) Alyssa Naeher	Chicago Red Stars	
7	Winner	(United States) Laurel Ivory	Seattle Reign FC	
7	Nominees	(United States) Jane Campbell	Houston Dash	
7	Nominees	(Bosnia and Herzegovina) DiDi Haračić	Angel City FC	
7	Nominees	(United States) Shelby Hogan	Portland Thorns FC	
8	Winner	(United States) Kelli Hubly	Portland Thorns FC	
8	Nominees	(Germany) Ann-Katrin Berger	NJ/NY Gotham FC	
8	Nominees	(United States) Laurel Ivory	Seattle Reign FC	
8	Nominees	(United States) Aubrey Kingsbury	Washington Spirit	
9	Winner	(United States) Kiki Pickett	Bay FC	
9	Nominees	(United States) Adrianna Franch	Kansas City Current	
9	Nominees	(United States) Mandy Haught	Utah Royals	
9	Nominees	(United States) Laurel Ivory	Seattle Reign FC	
10	Winner	(United States) Lauren Flynn	Utah Royals	
10	Nominees	(Bosnia and Herzegovina) DiDi Haračić	Angel City FC	
10	Nominees	(United States) Mandy Haught	Utah Royals	
10	Nominees	(Canada) Kailen Sheridan	San Diego Wave FC	
11	Winner	(United States) Mandy Haught	Utah Royals	
11	Nominees	(Germany) Ann-Katrin Berger	NJ/NY Gotham FC	
11	Nominees	(United States) Adrianna Franch	Kansas City Current	
11	Nominees	(Bosnia and Herzegovina) DiDi Haračić	Angel City FC	
12	Winner	(Canada) Kailen Sheridan	San Diego Wave	
12	Nominees	(United States) Jane Campbell	Houston Dash	
12	Nominees	(United States) Mandy Haught	Utah Royals	
12	Nominees	(United States) Katie Lund	Racing Louisville FC	
13	Winner	(Bosnia and Herzegovina) DiDi Haračić	Angel City FC	
13	Nominees	(United States) Mandy Haught	Utah Royals	
13	Nominees	(United States) Katie Lund	Racing Louisville FC	
13	Nominees	(United States) Alyssa Naeher	Chicago Red Stars	
14	Winner	(United States) Alyssa Naeher (2)	Chicago Red Stars	
14	Nominees	(United States) Shelby Hogan	Portland Thorns FC	
14	Nominees	(United States) Aubrey Kingsbury	Washington Spirit	
14	Nominees	(United States) Tatumn Milazzo	Chicago Red Stars	
15	Winner	(United States) Claudia Dickey	Seattle Reign FC	
15	Nominees	(United States) Mandy Haught	Utah Royals FC	
15	Nominees	(United States) Shelby Hogan	Portland Thorns FC	
15	Nominees	(England) Anna Moorhouse	Orlando Pride	
16	Winner	(Bosnia and Herzegovina) DiDi Haračić (2)	Angel City FC	
16	Nominees	(United States) Jane Campbell	Houston Dash	
16	Nominees	(United States) Casey Murphy	North Carolina Courage	
16	Nominees	(Canada) Kailen Sheridan	San Diego Wave FC	
17	Winner	(Australia) Mackenzie Arnold	Portland Thorns FC	
17	Nominees	(United States) Alana Cook	Kansas City Current	
17	Nominees	(Bosnia and Herzegovina) DiDi Haračić	Angel City FC	
17	Nominees	(Canada) Kailen Sheridan	San Diego Wave FC	
18	Winner	(Finland) Natalia Kuikka	Chicago Red Stars	
18	Nominees	(United States) Katie Lund	Racing Louisville FC	
18	Nominees	(United States) Casey Murphy	North Carolina Courage	
18	Nominees	(Germany) Almuth Schult	Kansas City Current	
19	Winner	(Germany) Ann-Katrin Berger	NJ/NY Gotham FC	
19	Nominees	(United States) Katie Lund	Racing Louisville FC	
19	Nominees	(United States) Casey Murphy	North Carolina Courage	
19	Nominees	(Germany) Almuth Schult	Kansas City Current	
20	Winner	(England) Anna Moorhouse	Orlando Pride	
20	Nominees	(Bosnia and Herzegovina) DiDi Haračić	Angel City FC	
20	Nominees	(United States) Katie Lund	Racing Louisville FC	
20	Nominees	(Germany) Almuth Schult	Kansas City Current	
21	Winner	(United States) Aubrey Kingsbury (2)	Washington Spirit	
21	Nominees	(United States) Jane Campbell	Houston Dash	
21	Nominees	(Puerto Rico) Cristina Roque	Utah Royals	
21	Nominees	(Germany) Almuth Schult	Kansas City Current	
22	Winner	(United States) Kaleigh Kurtz	North Carolina Courage	
22	Nominees	(United States) Mandy Haught	Utah Royals	
22	Nominees	(United States) Shelby Hogan	Portland Thorns	
22	Nominees	(United States) Casey Murphy	North Carolina Courage	
23	Winner	(United States) Kayla Sharples	Kansas City Current	
23	Nominees	(Bosnia and Herzegovina) DiDi Haračić	Angel City FC	
23	Nominees	(United States) Aubrey Kingsbury	Washington Spirit	
23	Nominees	(United States) Katie Lund	Racing Louisville FC	
24	Winner	(United States) Alyssa Naeher (3)	Chicago Red Stars	
24	Nominees	(Bosnia and Herzegovina) DiDi Haračić	Angel City FC	
24	Nominees	(United States) Shelby Hogan	Portland Thorns FC	
24	Nominees	(United States) Casey Murphy	North Carolina Courage	
25	Winner	(United States) Katie Lund	Racing Louisville FC	
25	Nominees	(United States) Heather Hinz	Houston Dash	
25	Nominees	(United States) Casey Murphy	North Carolina Courage	
25	Nominees	(Germany) Almuth Schult	Kansas City Current	

=== 2025 ===
Week	Honor	Player	Team	Ref.
1	Winner	(Canada) Kailen Sheridan	San Diego Wave FC	
1	Nominees	(United States) Angelina Anderson	Angel City FC	
1	Nominees	(Brazil) Lorena	Kansas City Current	
1	Nominees	(United States) Casey Murphy	North Carolina Courage	
2	Winner	(Brazil) Lorena	Kansas City Current	
2	Nominees	(United States) Angelina Anderson	Angel City FC	
2	Nominees	(Germany) Ann-Katrin Berger	NJ/NY Gotham FC	
2	Nominees	(United States) Aubrey Kingsbury	Washington Spirit	
3	Winner	(Australia) Mackenzie Arnold	Portland Thorns FC	
3	Nominees	(United States) Aubrey Kingsbury	Washington Spirit	
3	Nominees	(United States) Alyssa Naeher	Chicago Stars FC	
3	Nominees	(Canada) Kailen Sheridan	San Diego Wave FC	
4	Winner	(United States) Jordan Silkowitz	Bay FC	
4	Nominees	(United States) Claudia Dickey	Seattle Reign FC	
4	Nominees	(Brazil) Lorena	Kansas City Current	
4	Nominees	(England) Anna Moorhouse	Orlando Pride	
5	Winner	(Canada) Kailen Sheridan (2)	San Diego Wave FC	
5	Nominees	(United States) Angelina Anderson	Angel City FC	
5	Nominees	(United States) Bella Bixby	Portland Thorns FC	
5	Nominees	(United States) Claudia Dickey	Seattle Reign FC	
6	Winner	(Brazil) Lorena (2)	Kansas City Current	
6	Nominees	(Germany) Ann-Katrin Berger	NJ/NY Gotham FC	
6	Nominees	(United States) Jane Campbell	Houston Dash	
6	Nominees	(England) Anna Moorhouse	Orlando Pride	
7	Winner	(United States) Jordyn Bloomer	Racing Louisville FC	
7	Nominees	(Canada) Zara Chavoshi	Orlando Pride	
7	Nominees	(United States) Alyssa Naeher	Chicago Stars FC	
7	Nominees	(United States) Jordan Silkowitz	Bay FC	
8	Winner	(United States) Aubrey Kingsbury	Washington Spirit	
8	Nominees	(United States) Jordyn Bloomer	Racing Louisville FC	
8	Nominees	(Canada) Kailen Sheridan	San Diego Wave FC	
8	Nominees	(United States) Abby Smith	Houston Dash	
9	Winner	(United States) Mandy McGlynn	Utah Royals	
9	Nominees	(United States) Bella Bixby	Portland Thorns FC	
9	Nominees	(United States) Casey Murphy	North Carolina Courage	
9	Nominees	(United States) Alyssa Naeher	Chicago Stars FC	
10	Winner	(United States) Mandy McGlynn (2)	Utah Royals	
10	Nominees	(United States) Jordyn Bloomer	Racing Louisville FC	
10	Nominees	(United States) Jordan Silkowitz	Bay FC	
10	Nominees	(United States) Abby Smith	Houston Dash	
11	Winner	(United States) Claudia Dickey	Seattle Reign FC	
11	Nominees	(United States) Aubrey Kingsbury	Washington Spirit	
11	Nominees	(United States) Mandy McGlynn	Utah Royals	
11	Nominees	(United States) Jordan Silkowitz	Bay FC	
12	Winner	(Germany) Ann-Katrin Berger	Gotham FC	
12	Nominees	(United States) Halle Mackiewicz	Chicago Stars FC	
12	Nominees	(England) Anna Moorhouse	Orlando Pride	
12	Nominees	(United States) Abby Smith	Houston Dash	
13	Winner	(Brazil) Lorena (3)	Kansas City Current	
13	Nominees	(United States) Jane Campbell	Houston Dash	
13	Nominees	(United States) Mandy McGlynn	Utah Royals	
13	Nominees	(Canada) Kailen Sheridan	San Diego Wave FC	
14	Winner	(United States) Aubrey Kingsbury (2)	Washington Spirit	
14	Nominees	(Germany) Ann-Katrin Berger	Gotham FC	
14	Nominees	(United States) Laurel Ivory	Kansas City Current	
14	Nominees	(United States) Mia Justus	Utah Royals	
15	Winner	(United States) Jordyn Bloomer (2)	Racing Louisville FC	
15	Nominees	(United States) Claudia Dickey	Seattle Reign FC	
15	Nominees	(Canada) Kailen Sheridan	San Diego Wave FC	
15	Nominees	(United States) Jordan Silkowitz	Bay FC	
16	Winner	(United States) Aubrey Kingsbury (3)	Washington Spirit	
16	Nominees	(United States) Emily Mason	Seattle Reign FC	
16	Nominees	(United States) Mandy McGlynn	Utah Royals	
16	Nominees	(United States) Jordan Silkowitz	Bay FC	
16	Winner	(United States) Aubrey Kingsbury (3)	Washington Spirit	
16	Nominees	(United States) Emily Mason	Seattle Reign FC	
16	Nominees	(United States) Mandy McGlynn	Utah Royals	
16	Nominees	(United States) Jordan Silkowitz	Bay FC	
17	Winner	(United States) Hannah Seabert	Angel City FC	
17	Nominees	(United States) Jordyn Bloomer	Racing Louisville FC	
17	Nominees	(United States) Aubrey Kingsbury	Washington Spirit	
17	Nominees	(United States) Jordan Silkowitz	Bay FC	
18	Winner	(United States) Aubrey Kingsbury (4)	Washington Spirit	
18	Nominees	(United States) Jane Campbell	Houston Dash	
18	Nominees	(Brazil) Lorena	Kansas City Current	
18	Nominees	(United States) Mandy McGlynn	Utah Royals	
19	Winner	(United States) Jordan Silkowitz (2)	Bay FC	
19	Nominees	(Germany) Ann-Katrin Berger	Gotham FC	
19	Nominees	(United States) Jane Campbell	Houston Dash	
19	Nominees	(United States) Alyssa Naeher	Chicago Stars FC	
20	Winner	(United States) Jordan Silkowitz (3)	Bay FC	
20	Nominees	(Australia) Mackenzie Arnold	Portland Thorns FC	
20	Nominees	(Germany) Ann-Katrin Berger	Gotham FC	
20	Nominees	(United States) Jordyn Bloomer	Racing Louisville FC	
21	Winner	(United States) Alyssa Naeher	Chicago Stars FC	
21	Nominees	(United States) Angelina Anderson	Angel City FC	
21	Nominees	(Australia) Mackenzie Arnold	Portland Thorns FC	
21	Nominees	(United States) Maycee Bell	Gotham FC	
22	Winner	(United States) Mia Justus	Utah Royals	
22	Nominees	(United States) Angelina Anderson	Angel City FC	
22	Nominees	(Brazil) Lorena	Kansas City Current	
22	Nominees	(England) Anna Moorhouse	Orlando Pride	
23	Winner	(Australia) Mackenzie Arnold (2)	Portland Thorns FC	
23	Nominees	(United States) Jordyn Bloomer	Racing Louisville FC	
23	Nominees	(United States) Claudia Dickey	Seattle Reign FC	
23	Nominees	(Canada) Kailen Sheridan	San Diego Wave FC	
24	Winner	(United States) Alyssa Naeher (2)	Chicago Stars FC	
24	Nominees	(Australia) Mackenzie Arnold	Portland Thorns FC	
24	Nominees	(England) Anna Moorhouse	Orlando Pride	
24	Nominees	(United States) Jordan Silkowitz	Bay FC	
25	Winner	(United States) Shelby Hogan	Gotham FC	
25	Nominees	(United States) Jordyn Bloomer	Racing Louisville FC	
25	Nominees	(United States) Alyssa Naeher	Chicago Stars FC	
25	Nominees	(United States) Jordan Silkowitz	Bay FC	
26	Winner	(United States) Alyssa Naeher (3)	Chicago Stars FC	
26	Nominees	(United States) Angelina Anderson	Angel City FC	
26	Nominees	(Germany) Ann-Katrin Berger	Gotham FC	
26	Nominees	(United States) Aubrey Kingsbury	Washington Spirit	

=== 2026 ===
Week	Honor	Player	Team	Ref.
1	Winner	(United States) Jordyn Bloomer	Racing Louisville FC	
1	Nominees	(United States) Jane Campbell	Houston Dash	
1	Nominees	(Bosnia and Herzegovina) DiDi Haračić	San Diego Wave FC	
1	Nominees	(Canada) Kailen Sheridan	North Carolina Courage	
2	Winner	(United States) Abby Smith	Denver Summit FC	
2	Nominees	(United States) Jordyn Bloomer	Racing Louisville FC	
2	Nominees	(United States) Mia Justus	Utah Royals	
2	Nominees	(United States) Casey Murphy	Boston Legacy FC	
3	Winner	(United States) Morgan Messner	Portland Thorns FC	
3	Nominees	(United States) Mia Justus	Utah Royals	
3	Nominees	(Scotland) Sandy MacIver	Washington Spirit	
3	Nominees	(United States) Alyssa Naeher	Chicago Stars FC	
4	Winner	(Germany) Kathrin Hendrich	Chicago Stars FC	
4	Nominees	(United States) Jordyn Bloomer	Racing Louisville FC	
4	Nominees	(United States) Mia Justus	Utah Royals	
4	Nominees	(United States) Jordan Silkowitz	Bay FC	
5	Winner	(United States) Katie Atkinson	Chicago Stars FC	
5	Nominees	(Australia) Mackenzie Arnold	Portland Thorns FC	
5	Nominees	(Scotland) Sandy MacIver	Washington Spirit	
5	Nominees	(United States) Jordan Silkowitz	Bay FC	
6	Winner	(United States) Jordan Silkowitz	Bay FC	
6	Nominees	(United States) Jordyn Bloomer	Racing Louisville FC	
6	Nominees	(United States) Jane Campbell	Houston Dash	
6	Nominees	(United States) Mandy McGlynn	Utah Royals	
7	Winner	(Colombia) Jorelyn Carabalí	Boston Legacy FC	
7	Nominees	(United States) Kate Del Fava	Utah Royals	
7	Nominees	(Canada) Kailen Sheridan	North Carolina Courage	
7	Nominees	(United States) Jordan Silkowitz	Bay FC	
8	Winner	(United States) Angelina Anderson	Angel City FC	
8	Nominees	(Germany) Ann-Katrin Berger	Gotham FC	
8	Nominees	(United States) Jordyn Bloomer	Racing Louisville FC	
8	Nominees	(Brazil) Lorena	Kansas City Current	
9	Winner	(United States) Malia Berkely	Houston Dash	
9	Nominees	(United States) Angelina Anderson	Angel City FC	
9	Nominees	(England) Anna Moorhouse	Orlando Pride	
9	Nominees	(United States) Katie Atkinson	Chicago Stars FC	
10	Winner	(Canada) Kailen Sheridan	North Carolina Courage	
10	Nominees	(United States) Mandy McGlynn	Utah Royals	
10	Nominees	(United States) Abby Smith	Denver Summit FC	
10	Nominees	(Bosnia and Herzegovina) DiDi Haračić	San Diego Wave FC	
11	Winner	(United States) Jane Campbell	Houston Dash	
11	Nominees	(United States) Jordan Silkowitz	Bay FC	
11	Nominees	(United States) Cassie Miller	Seattle Reign FC	
11	Nominees	(England) Anna Moorhouse	Orlando Pride	
12	Winner	(Germany) Ann-Katrin Berger	Gotham FC	
12	Nominees	(England) Anna Moorhouse	Orlando Pride	
12	Nominees	(United States) Mandy McGlynn	Utah Royals	
12	Nominees	(United States) Casey Murphy	Boston Legacy FC	
13	Winner	(Canada) Kailen Sheridan (2)	North Carolina Courage	
13	Nominees	(United States) Katie Atkinson	Chicago Stars FC	
13	Nominees	(United States) Jordyn Bloomer	Racing Louisville FC	
13	Nominees	(United States) Abby Smith	Denver Summit FC	
14	Winner	(United States) Katie Atkinson (2)	Chicago Stars FC	
14	Nominees	(United States) Jane Campbell	Houston Dash	
14	Nominees	(United States) Jordyn Bloomer	Racing Louisville FC	
14	Nominees	(United States) Angelina Anderson	Angel City FC	
15	Winner	(United States) Mandy McGlynn	Utah Royals	
15	Nominees	(United States) Shelby Hogan	Gotham FC	
15	Nominees	(Scotland) Sandy MacIver	Washington Spirit	
15	Nominees	(United States) Angelina Anderson	Angel City FC	
16	Winner	(Australia) Mackenzie Arnold	Portland Thorns FC	
16	Nominees	(Canada) Kailen Sheridan	North Carolina Courage	
16	Nominees	(United States) Abby Smith	Denver Summit FC	
16	Nominees	(United States) Jordyn Bloomer	Racing Louisville FC	

== Multiple winners ==
The below table lists players who have won Save of the Week on more than one occasion as of August 11, 2026.

Rank	Player	Team(s) played for as winner	Wins
1	(United States) Ashlyn Harris	Orlando Pride, NJ/NY Gotham FC	36
2	(United States) Adrianna Franch	Portland Thorns FC, Kansas City Current	16
3	(United States) Aubrey Kingsbury^{*}	Orlando Pride, Washington Spirit	14
3	(United States) Alyssa Naeher^{*}	Chicago Stars FC	14
5	(Canada) Kailen Sheridan^{*}	NJ/NY Gotham FC, San Diego Wave FC, North Carolina Courage	13
6	(United States) Abby Smith^{*}	Boston Breakers, Kansas City Current, Portland Thorns FC, NJ/NY Gotham FC, Denver Summit FC	11
7	(United States) Phallon Tullis-Joyce	OL Reign	8
8	(United States) Michelle Betos	Portland Thorns FC, Racing Louisville FC, NJ/NY Gotham FC	7
9
9	(United States) Jane Campbell^{*}	Houston Dash	6
9	(Bosnia and Herzegovina) DiDi Haračić^{*}	NJ/NY Gotham FC, Angel City FC	6
9	(United States) Haley Kopmeyer	Orlando Pride	6
12	(United States) Katie Atkinson^{*}	Racing Louisville FC, Chicago Stars FC	5
13	(Australia) Mackenzie Arnold^{*}	Portland Thorns FC	4
13	(United States) Bella Bixby^{*}	Portland Thorns FC	4
13	(United States) Mandy McGlynn^{*}	Utah Royals	4
13	(United States) Jordan Silkowitz^{*}	Bay FC	4
17	(United States) Angelina Anderson^{*}	Angel City FC	3
17	(Germany) Ann-Katrin Berger^{*}	Gotham FC	3
17	(United States) Jordyn Bloomer^{*}	Racing Louisville FC	3
17	(United States) Nicole Barnhart	FC Kansas City, Utah Royals FC	3
17	(United States) Claudia Dickey^{*}	Seattle Reign FC	3
17	(Brazil) Lorena^{*}	Kansas City Current	3
23	(Scotland) Rachel Corsie	Utah Royals FC	2
23	(United States) Britt Eckerstrom	Western New York Flash, Portland Thorns FC	2
23	(United States) Shelby Hogan^{*}	Portland Thorns FC, Gotham FC	2
23	(United States) Tatumn Milazzo^{*}	Chicago Red Stars	2
23	(Brazil) Mônica	Orlando Pride	2
23	(Australia) Lydia Williams	Houston Dash	2

Bold^{*} indicates players playing in the NWSL and their current team.
Italics indicates players playing professional soccer outside of the NWSL.

== See also ==
- List of sports awards honoring women
- NWSL awards
- NWSL records and statistics
- Women's soccer in the United States
