= NWSL Goalkeeper of the Year =

National Women's Soccer League award

2024 and 2026 winner Ann-Katrin Berger

The NWSL Goalkeeper of the Year award is presented annually to the best goalkeeper in the National Women's Soccer League (NWSL).

Nicole Barnhart (2013) won the first Goalkeeper of the Year award in the NWSL's inaugural season. The most recent winner is Lorena (2024 and 2026).

As of 2025, the NWSL's individual end-of-year awards are voted upon in two rounds: in the first round, players (50%), owners/general managers/coaches (25%), and media (25%) vote to determine the nominees; in the second round, players (40%), owners/general managers/coaches (25%), media (25%), and fans (10%) vote among the nominees to determine the winner.

== Winners ==
| Season | Player | Nationality | Club | Other finalists | Ref. |
|---|---|---|---|---|---|
| 2013 | Nicole Barnhart | United States | FC Kansas City | | |
| 2014 | Alyssa Naeher | United States | Boston Breakers | Ashlyn Harris, Hope Solo | |
| 2015 | Michelle Betos | United States | Portland Thorns FC | Nicole Barnhart, Brittany Cameron | |
| 2016 | Ashlyn Harris | United States | Orlando Pride | Michelle Betos, Alyssa Naeher | |
| 2017 | Adrianna Franch | United States | Portland Thorns FC | Alyssa Naeher, Katelyn Rowland | |
| 2018 | Adrianna Franch (2) | United States | Portland Thorns FC | Lydia Williams, Aubrey Bledsoe | |
| 2019 | Aubrey Kingsbury | United States | Washington Spirit | Casey Murphy, Kailen Sheridan | |
| 2020 | 2020 regular season cancelled due COVID-19 pandemic | | | | |
| 2021 | Aubrey Kingsbury (2) | United States | Washington Spirit | Bella Bixby, Kailen Sheridan | |
| 2022 | Kailen Sheridan | Canada | San Diego Wave FC | Adrianna Franch, Phallon Tullis-Joyce | |
| 2023 | Jane Campbell | United States | Houston Dash | Katie Lund, Kailen Sheridan | |
| 2024 | Ann-Katrin Berger | Germany | NJ/NY Gotham FC | Mandy Haught, Anna Moorhouse | |
| 2025 | Lorena | Brazil | Kansas City Current | Ann-Katrin Berger, Claudia Dickey | |
| 2026 | Ann-Katrin Berger (2) | Germany | Gotham FC | Jane Campbell, Jordan Silkowitz | |

== Wins by team ==
| Club | Wins |
|---|---|
| Portland Thorns FC | 3 |
| Gotham FC | 2 |
| Washington Spirit | 2 |
| Boston Breakers | 1 |
| FC Kansas City | 1 |
| Houston Dash | 1 |
| Kansas City Current | 1 |
| Orlando Pride | 1 |
| San Diego Wave FC | 1 |

== Wins by nationality ==
| Nationality | Wins |
|---|---|
| United States | 9 |
| Germany | 2 |
| Brazil | 1 |
| Canada | 1 |

== See also ==
- List of sports awards honoring women
- NWSL Players' Awards
- NWSL awards
- NWSL records and statistics
- Women's soccer in the United States
