= Michelle Betos =

American soccer player (born 1988)

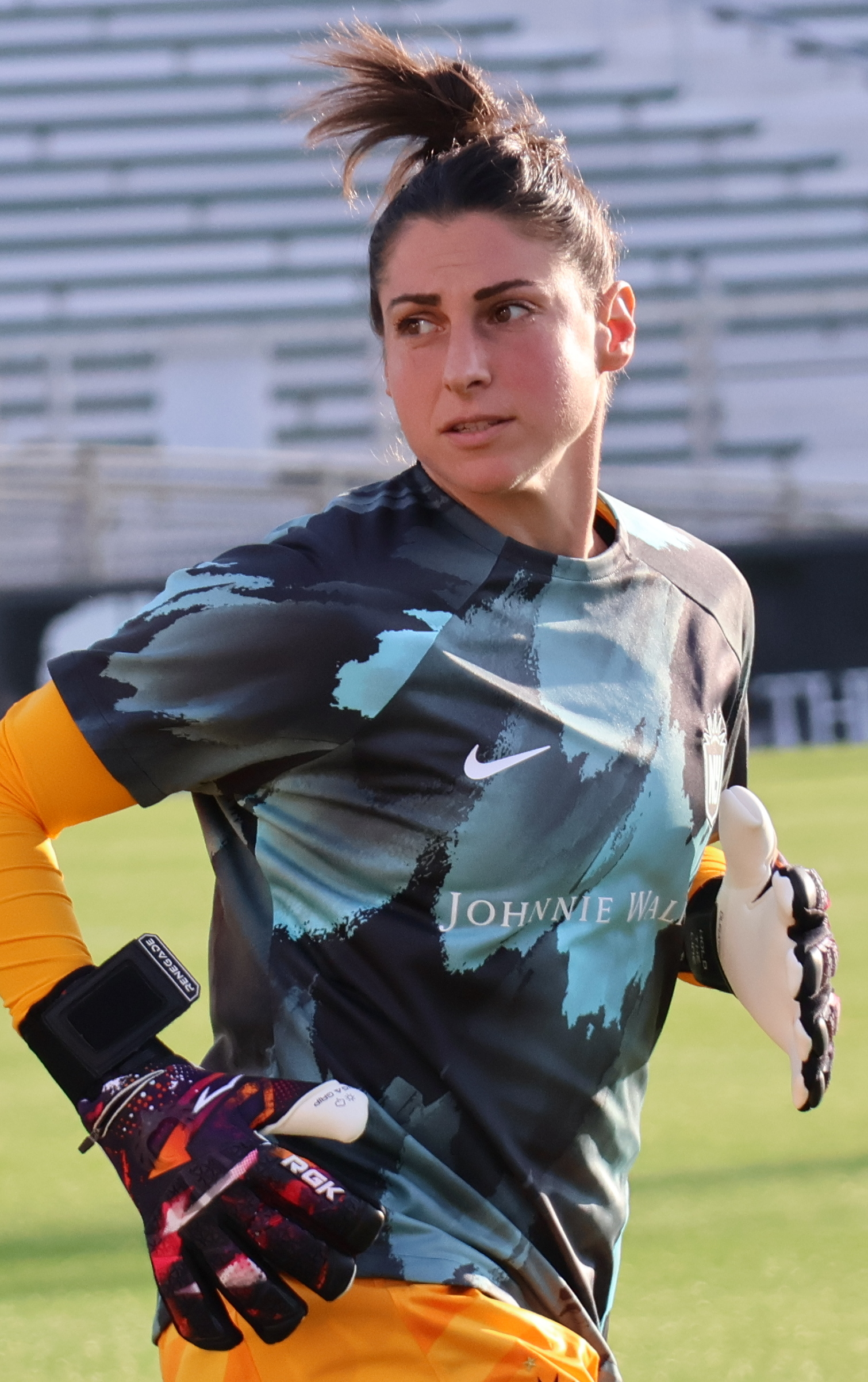
- Betos with Gotham FC in 2024

Personal information
- Full name: Michelle Jenny Betos
- Date of birth: February 20, 1988 (age 38)
- Place of birth: Queens, New York, United States
- Height: 5 ft 9 in (1.75 m)
- Position: Goalkeeper

Youth career
- 2004–2006: Albertson Fury

College career
Years	Team	Apps	(Gls)
2006–2009	Georgia Bulldogs	81	(0)

Senior career*
Years	Team	Apps	(Gls)
2009	Atlanta Silverbacks		
2010	River Plate		
2011	Boston Aztec		
2012	New York Fury		
2012–2013	Apollon Limassol		
2013	Seattle Reign FC	7	(0)
2014–2016	Portland Thorns FC	31	(1)
2014	→ Fortuna Hjørring (loan)		
2015–2016	→ Sydney FC (loan)	13	(0)
2017	Vålerenga	20	(0)
2018–2020	OL Reign	12	(0)
2021	Racing Louisville	20	(0)
2022–2024	Gotham FC	14	(0)
2025	Gotham FC	0	(0)
- * Club domestic league appearances and goals as of November 29, 2023

Michelle Jenny Betos (born February 20, 1988) is an American professional soccer coach and former player who played as a goalkeeper. She is perhaps best known for being the first NWSL goalkeeper to score a goal in league play.

Betos played collegiate soccer at the University of Georgia and signed her first pro contract with the USL W-League Atlanta Silverbacks in 2009. Prior to the founding of the NWSL, she played for Club Atlético River Plate, Apollon Limassol, and WPSL Elite teams Boston Aztec and New York Fury. She signed with Seattle Reign FC ahead of the NWSL's first season, starting in seven league matches while Hope Solo recovered from a wrist injury.

Following a trade to the Portland Thorns in 2014 and a loan spell at Fortuna Hjorring, Betos had her breakout campaign during the 2015 season, replacing Nadine Angerer as first-choice keeper to start 14 games for the Thorns, and winning the NWSL Goalkeeper of the Year award. In 2016, she won the NWSL Shield with the Thorns. After a further loan to Sydney FC, and a season at Vålerenga, she returned to the NWSL for a further two seasons at the Reign during which she made 12 starts.

Betos was selected by Racing Louisville in the 2020 NWSL Expansion Draft and went on to captain the team during their inaugural season, starting in 20 league games. She signed for Gotham FC in January 2022 and went on to win the 2023 NWSL Championship with the team. After retiring as a player following the 2024 season, she joined the Gotham FC staff as assistant goalkeeper coach.

== Early life ==
Born in Queens, New York to parents Luke and Susan Betos, Michelle began playing soccer at age five at the urging of her father, a one-time semi-professional player in Greece. She attended St. Francis Preparatory School in the New York City borough of Queens. She was a two-year captain on the soccer team and was named 2005 Most Valuable Player. She played for the Albertson Fury '87 from 2004 to 2006, during which time she was coached by Paul Riley, and was a member of the Region I Olympic Development Program (ODP) team in 2006. In 2005, she was named an ENYSSA State Team player and participated in the Super Y-League Olympic Development Program (ODP) National Camp.

== College career ==
=== University of Georgia ===
Betos attended the University of Georgia. She finished her college career with a total of 316 saves, ranking third all-time at Georgia and second in shutouts (26) and wins (48). During her senior year, she started all 22 games, logging 1,929 minutes and earned eight shutouts and a goals-against average (GAA) of 1.12 per game. Her junior year, she appeared in all 23 games making 22 starts. She recorded seven shutouts and a 1.19 GAA, finishing the season with 117 saves. Betos was named SEC All-Tournament Team and SEC Defensive Player of the Week on October 21, 2008. In 2007, she started all 24 games, finishing with 18 wins, eight shutouts and a 0.79 GAA. She recorded a save percentage of .816, making 84 saves and allowing 19 goals. She was named the team's Defensive Most Valuable Player. During her freshman year, Betos appeared in 12 games in goal, making eight starts. She led Georgia in GAA (1.18), save percentage (.732), fewest goals allowed (11), wins (5), shutouts (3) and saves (30). She was named to the SEC All-Freshman Team the same year.

== Club career ==
=== Atlanta Silverbacks, 2009 ===
Betos played for the Atlanta Silverbacks of the W-League during the 2009 season. She was named W-League Goalkeeper of the Year after leading the Atlanta Silverbacks to the regular season Southeast Division title. She finished the season with a 9–1–1 record and the team finished 10–1–1. She ranked second in the league for her 0.188 goals-against average, nine wins and nine shutouts.

=== New York Fury, 2012 ===
Betos signed with the New York Fury in the Women's Premier Soccer League Elite for the 2012 season, where she was reunited with former youth coach Paul Riley.

=== Apollon Limassol, 2012-2013 ===
Betos signed with Apollon Limassol for the 2012–2013 UEFA Women's Champions League campaign. She recorded five appearances for the team for a total of 450 minutes.

=== Seattle Reign FC, 2013 ===
Betos was selected by the Seattle Reign FC during the 2013 NWSL Supplemental Draft as their fifth pick and 34th pick overall. Intended to serve as a backup to Hope Solo, she was the starting goalkeeper for seven of the club's matches during the beginning of the 2013 season while Solo recovered from wrist surgery. Betos made 34 saves and registered a 2.0 goals against average.

=== Portland Thorns FC, 2014–2016 ===
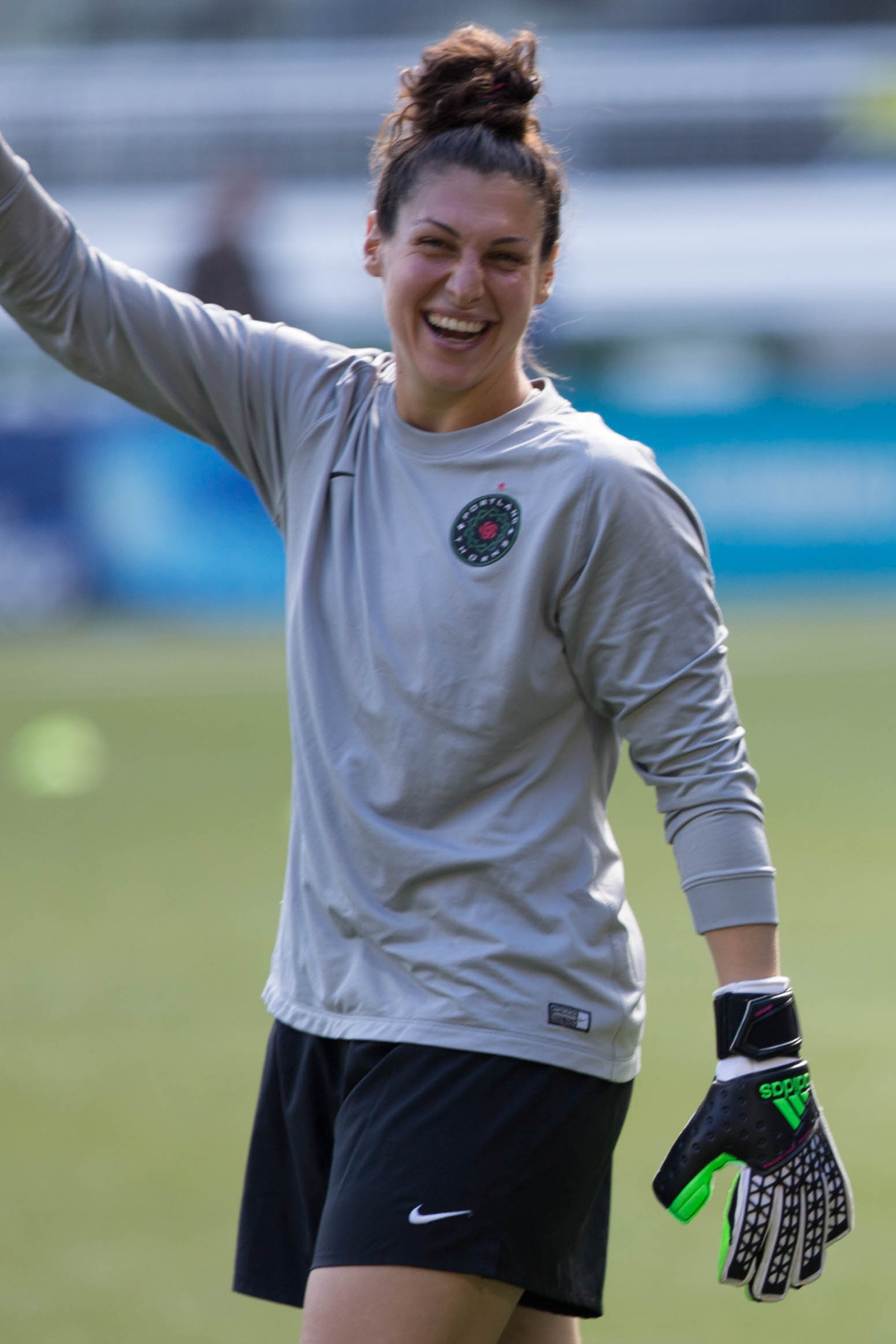
Bethos playing for the Thorns in 2016

In the 2013–14 offseason, Seattle traded Betos and Kristie Mewis to the Boston Breakers in exchange for Sydney Leroux. Boston soon traded Betos to Portland for the thirty-fourth pick in the 2014 NWSL College Draft. Initially serving as a backup to Nadine Angerer, Betos made 14 starts during the 2015 season. On June 19, 2015, Betos scored the equalizing goal for 10-woman Portland in the 95th minute against FC Kansas City. This was the first goal ever scored by a goalkeeper in the NWSL. Her goal was featured on ESPN SportsCenter as the #2 play during the show's Top 10 feature. She was subsequently named NWSL Player of the Week. Following the season, she was named NWSL Goalkeeper of the Year in spite of the team's relatively poor sixth-place finish. Betos was part of the 2016 Thorns team that won the NWSL Shield, making 14 appearances, with Adrianna Franch starting in the other six games. She was one of three finalists for Goalkeeper of the Year in 2016.

==== Loan to Sydney FC 2015-2016 ====
In September 2015, Betos joined Sydney FC on loan for the 2015–16 season, helping the team to a place in the 2016 W-League Grand Final.

=== Vålerenga, 2017 ===
Betos signed with Norwegian Toppserien side Vålerenga Fotball in 2017 in search of more starts, playing in all but three matches.

=== Return to Seattle Reign FC, 2018-2020 ===
On January 30, 2018, Seattle Reign FC announced that Betos would be returning to the club for the 2018 NWSL season. Betos would play in only 12 league games and three Challenge Cup games, struggling with injuries throughout her time at the Reign.

=== Racing Louisville FC, 2021 ===
On November 12, 2020, Betos was selected by Racing Louisville FC in the 2020 NWSL Expansion Draft. Betos captained the team during their first season in the NWSL, starting in 20 games and logging 95 saves, second in the league, and four clean sheets.

=== NJ/NY Gotham FC, 2022–2025 ===
After being released by Racing Louisville, Betos returned to her native New York by signing with NJ/NY Gotham FC on January 11, 2022. Betos competed with Ashlyn Harris for a starting spot during her first season at the club, with Betos playing in 14 games and Harris in eight. Following the signings of Abby Smith and Mandy Haught, Betos did not feature in the 2023 season, which ended in a sixth-place finish and an NWSL Championship win.

Betos was nominated as Gotham FC's candidate for the 2023 Ally Award, presented to the teammate who "embodies the spirit of the consummate teammate, inspiring rookies and veterans alike" on behalf of the NWSL Players Association. As of November 2023, Betos serves as one of Gotham FC's player representatives for the NWSLPA. She served on the bargaining committee for the NWSLPA's 2022-2026 collective bargaining agreement, the first in league history.

On January 22, 2025, Betos announced her retirement from professional soccer. The following month, Gotham FC announced Betos would join the team technical staff as assistant goalkeeper coach. She temporarily unretired in April 2025, filling in as an injury replacement player for backup goalkeepers Shelby Hogan and Ryan Campbell, but did not play in any games.

== Awards and honors ==
Portland Thorns FC

- NWSL Shield: 2016

NJ/NY Gotham FC

- NWSL Championship: 2023

Individual

- W-League Goalkeeper of the Year: 2009
- NWSL Best XI: 2015
- NWSL Goalkeeper of the Year: 2015
- NWSL Player of the Week: 2015 Week 10, 2021 Week 5
