= 2023 NWSL Championship =

Women's soccer match in California

- Event: NWSL Championship
OL Reign	NJ/NY Gotham FC
1	2
- Date: November 11, 2023
- Venue: Snapdragon Stadium, San Diego, California, U.S.
- Most Valuable Player: Midge Purce (NJ/NY Gotham FC)
- Referee: Katja Koroleva
- Attendance: 25,011

The 2023 NWSL Championship was the tenth edition of the NWSL Championship, the championship match of the National Women's Soccer League (NWSL), and took place on November 11, 2023. NJ/NY Gotham FC won 2–1 against OL Reign to become NWSL champions for the first time. The match was played at Snapdragon Stadium in San Diego, California.

== Road to the final ==
=== OL Reign ===
After winning the NWSL Shield the previous year, OL Reign placed fourth in the 2023 regular-season standings, one point above the playoff line. In the first round of the playoffs, an 87th-minute goal scored by Veronica Latsko was the difference in the 1–0 win over fifth seed Angel City at Lumen Field, the Reign's first playoff win since 2015. In the semifinals, Latsko scored again in the 47th minute against the NWSL Shield champion San Diego Wave FC as the Reign won 1–0 to reach their third NWSL final.

=== NJ/NY Gotham FC ===
After a bottom-of-the-table finish the previous year, Gotham FC rose to sixth place in the 2023 regular season, making the playoffs on goal difference. In the first round of the playoffs, Delanie Sheehan and Yazmeen Ryan each scored as Gotham won 2–0 against the third seed North Carolina Courage at WakeMed Soccer Park, giving Gotham their first NWSL playoff win. In the semifinals, Gotham won 1–0 against the second seed Portland Thorns FC, with Katie Stengel hitting the extra-time winner at Providence Park to send Gotham to their first NWSL final.

== Match ==
=== Details ===
November 11, 2023
17:00 PST

OL Reign	1–2	NJ/NY Gotham FC
Lavelle 29'	Report	Williams 24'; Esther 45+2'

Snapdragon Stadium, San Diego, California
Attendance: 25,011
Referee: Katja Koroleva

OL Reign	NJ/NY Gotham FC

GK	30	(United States) Claudia Dickey
LB	21	(United States) Phoebe McClernon
CB	3	(United States) Lauren Barnes
CB	4	(United States) Alana Cook
RB	11	(United States) Sofia Huerta
CM	10	(Wales) Jess Fishlock		(substituted off) 85'
DM	2	(United States) Emily Sonnett	(yellow card) 87'
AM	16	(United States) Rose Lavelle
LW	15	(United States) Megan Rapinoe		(substituted off) 6'
FW	9	(Canada) Jordyn Huitema
RW	24	(United States) Veronica Latsko		(substituted off) 76'
Substitutes:
GK	18	(United States) Laurel Ivory
MF	5	(United States) Quinn		(substituted in) 76'
MF	6	(Brazil) Angelina
MF	7	(United States) Nikki Stanton
FW	8	(United States) Bethany Balcer		(substituted in) 6'
DF	17	(United States) Sam Hiatt
FW	23	(United States) Tziarra King
MF	33	(United States) Olivia Van der Jagt
FW	34	(United States) Elyse Bennett		(substituted in) 85'
Manager:
(England) Laura Harvey

GK	24	(United States) Mandy Haught	(red card) 90+7'
LB	32	(United States) Jenna Nighswonger
CB	11	(United States) Ali Krieger
CB	77	(Spain) Maitane
RB	3	(Brazil) Bruninha
DM	14	(United States) Nealy Martin
LM	10	(United States) Lynn Williams
CM	17	(United States) Delanie Sheehan		(substituted off) 82'
CM	18	(United States) Yazmeen Ryan		(substituted off) 69'
RM	23	(United States) Midge Purce
FW	9	(Spain) Esther		(substituted off) 89'
Substitutes:
GK	1	(United States) Michelle Betos
DF	5	(United States) Kelley O'Hara
MF	6	(United States) Allie Long		(substituted in) 82'
DF	12	(United States) Kristen Edmonds
MF	13	(United States) Mana Shim
MF	19	(United States) Kristie Mewis
DF	21	(United States) Ellie Jean
FW	28	(United States) Katie Stengel		(substituted in) 89'
MF	33	(Republic of Ireland) Sinead Farrelly		(substituted in) 69'
Manager:
(Spain) Juan Carlos Amorós

Most Valuable Player:
(United States) Midge Purce

Assistant referees:
Jennifer Garner (United States)
Katarzyna Wasiak (United States)
Fourth official:
Anya Voigt (United States)
Video assistant referee:
Kevin Broadley (United States)

Match rules

- 90 minutes.
- 30 minutes of extra time if necessary.
- Penalty shootout if scores still level.
- Maximum of three substitutions.
