= Lorena (footballer) =

Brazilian footballer (born 1997)

- Lorena with the Kansas City Current in 2026

Personal information
- Full name: Lorena da Silva Leite
- Date of birth: 6 May 1997 (age 29)
- Place of birth: Ituverava, Brazil
- Height: 1.83 m (6 ft 0 in)
- Position: Goalkeeper

Team information
- Current team: Kansas City Current

Youth career
- 2011: Bangu
- 2012: Centro Olímpico
- 2013–2014: Grêmio
- 2015–2016: Centro Olímpico

Senior career*
Years	Team	Apps	(Gls)
2016	Centro Olímpico	0	(0)
2017–2018	Sport Recife	27	(0)
2019–2024	Grêmio	26	(0)
2025–	Kansas City Current	45	(0)

International career^{‡}
2016	Brazil U20	0	(0)
2021–	Brazil	22	(0)
Medal record
Women's football
Representing Brazil
Copa América Femenina
Gold medal – first place	2025 Ecuador
Olympic Games
Silver medal – second place	2024 Paris
- * Club domestic league appearances and goals as of 16:49, 14 November 2026 (UTC) ‡ National team caps and goals as of 23:23, 22 April 2024 (UTC)

Lorena da Silva Leite (born 6 May 1997), simply known as Lorena, is a Brazilian professional footballer who plays as a goalkeeper for the Kansas City Current of the National Women's Soccer League (NWSL) and the Brazil national team.

== Club career ==
=== Centro Olímpico ===
Born in Ituverava, São Paulo, Lorena was the third-choice goalkeeper for Centro Olímpico in 2016. She made the bench once against Rio Preto.

=== Sport Recife ===
For the 2017 season, she joined Sport Recife, where she became a regular starter. Lorena made her league debut against Audax on 12 March 2017.

=== Grêmio ===
In 2019, Lorena joined Grêmio, a club she had already represented at youth level. She was initially a backup to Raissa, but took over the starting spot in the 2021 season.

=== Kansas City Current ===
After five years at Grêmio, Lorena signed a three-year contract with NWSL club Kansas City Current on 23 December 2024. She made her NWSL debut in a 3–1 opening day win over the Portland Thorns on 15 March 2025. The following week, she kept her first NWSL clean sheet in a 2–0 win over the Washington Spirit, going on to keep four consecutive shutouts. Starting just before the summer break, she set an NWSL record with 690 consecutive shutout minutes. She finished the season with a league record 14 clean sheets in 24 league games, helping the Current win the NWSL Shield with the best regular-season record. The team set multiple NWSL records including most points, most wins, and fewest goals allowed in a season. In the playoffs, the Current were upset 2–1 by Gotham FC in the quarterfinals. Lorena was named the NWSL Goalkeeper of the Year at the end of the season.

== International career ==
After representing Brazil at under-20 level, Lorena received her first call up for the full side on 31 August 2021. She made her international debut on 29 November of that year, starting in a 4–1 International Women's Football Tournament of Manaus win over Venezuela.

After missing the 2023 FIFA Women's World Cup due to an ACL injury, Lorena made her major tournament debut at the 2024 Summer Olympics. She played every minute of the Olympics, keeping clean sheets in three of six matches and helping Brazil to the silver medal as runners-up to the United States.

== Career statistics ==
=== International ===
As of 4 March 2022

Brazil
Year	Apps	Goals
2021	1	0
2022	2	0
Total	3	0

== Honours ==
Grêmio

- Campeonato Gaúcho de Futebol Feminino: 2022, 2024

Kansas City Current

- NWSL Championship: 2026
- NWSL Shield: 2025

Brazil

- Summer Olympics silver medal: 2024
- Copa América Femenina: 2022, 2025

Individual

- Copa América Femenina best goalkeeper: 2022
- Copa América Femenina team of the tournament: 2022
- NWSL Goalkeeper of the Year: 2025
- NWSL Best XI First Team: 2025

== Personal life ==
Lorena married Carla Tatiane in 2024.
