= Jordan Silkowitz =

American soccer player (born 2000)

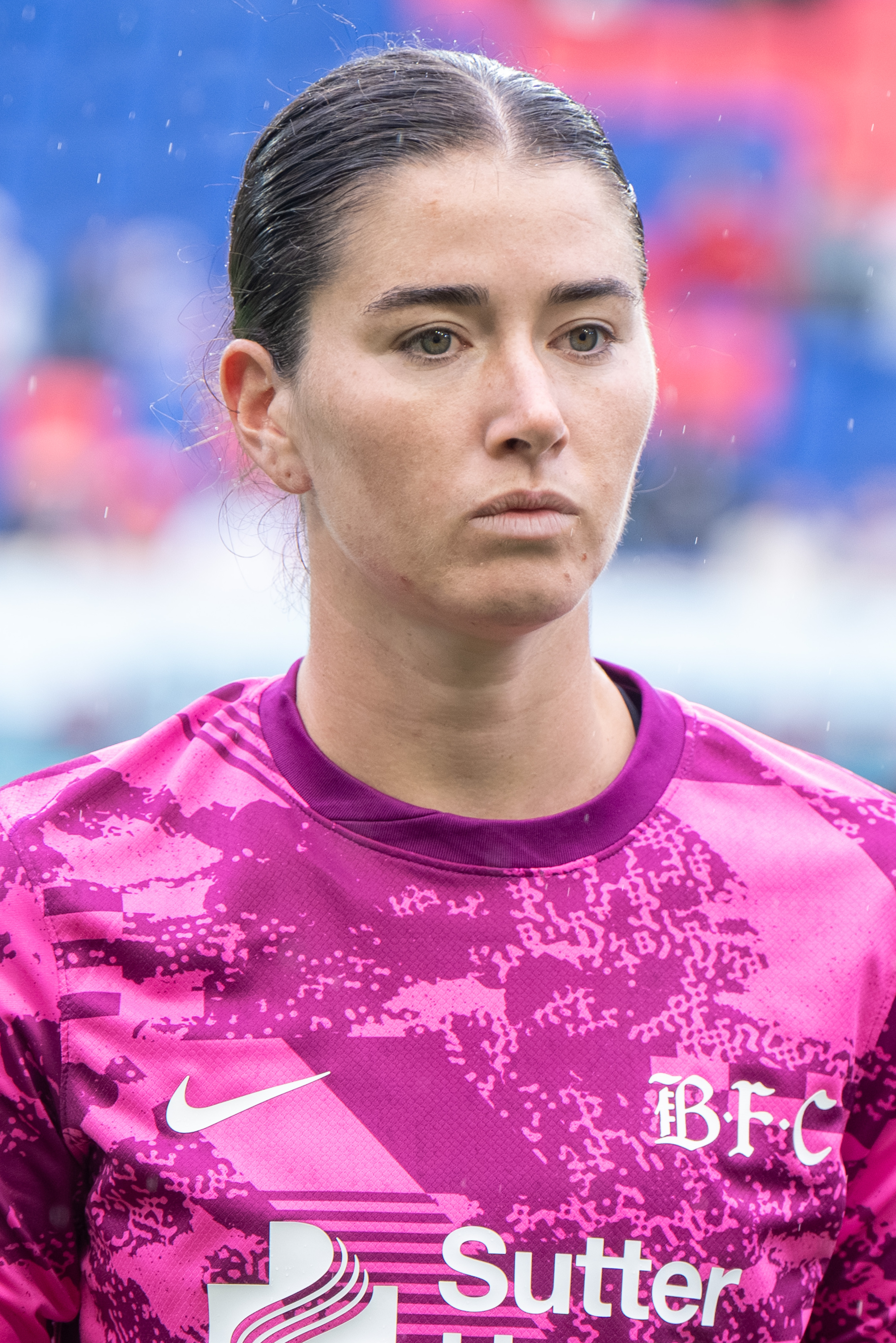
- Silkowitz with Bay FC in 2026

Personal information
- Full name: Jordan Michele Silkowitz
- Date of birth: March 27, 2000 (age 26)
- Height: 6 ft 0 in (1.83 m)
- Position: Goalkeeper

Team information
- Current team: Bay FC
- Number: 29

College career
| Years | Team | Apps | (Gls) |
| 2018–2019 | Ohio State Buckeyes | 18 | (0) |
| 2020–2022 | Iowa State Cyclones | 43 | (0) |

Senior career*
| Years | Team | Apps | (Gls) |
| 2023–2024 | Kansas City Current | 0 | (0) |
| 2023–2024 | → Brisbane Roar (loan) | 19 | (0) |
| 2024– | Bay FC | 53 | (0) |

International career^{‡}
| 2025 | United States U23 | 2 | (0) |
- * Club domestic league appearances and goals as of 04:58, November 2, 2026 (UTC) ‡ National team caps and goals as of 00:38, September 12, 2026 (UTC)

Jordan Michele Silkowitz (born March 27, 2000) is an American professional soccer player who plays as a goalkeeper for Bay FC of the National Women's Soccer League (NWSL). She played college soccer for the Ohio State Buckeyes and the Iowa State Cyclones and was drafted by the Kansas City Current in the second round of the 2023 NWSL Draft.

== Early life ==
Silkowitz was raised in Fairfax, Virginia, one of two children born to Robert Silkowitz and Joni Henderson. She attended Woodson High School, where she lettered in soccer all four years and was named second-team all-state in 2017. She played ECNL club soccer for McLean Youth Soccer. She committed to play college soccer for Ohio State during her senior year.

== College career ==
Silkowitz redshirted her freshman season with the Ohio State Buckeyes as a backup to Big Ten Goalkeeper of the Year Devon Kerr in 2018. In 2019, she made 4 starts and played in all 18 games with 8 scoreless outings, earning Big Ten all-freshman honors. She then transferred to the Iowa State Cyclones in 2020, starting all 13 games. She started 14 games and kept 4 clean sheets in 2021, including a shutout against top seed TCU in the Big 12 tournament before losing on penalties. She started all 17 games and led the Big 12 Conference with 100 saves while keeping 3 shutouts in 2022.

== Club career ==
=== Kansas Current and Brisbane Roar ===
Silkowitz was drafted by the Kansas City Current with the 18th overall pick in the second round of the 2023 NWSL Draft, becoming the first Iowa State player to be drafted in the NWSL. She was signed to a two-year contract. She never appeared in a competitive game for Kansas City, being a backup to Cassie Miller and Adrianna Franch.

On September 13, 2023, it was announced that Silkowitz would join the Brisbane Roar on a season-long loan. On October 15, three days after arriving in Australia, she made her professional debut starting in the season opener against Melbourne Victory. She played in 19 games on loan and kept 3 clean sheets before she was recalled to the Current on March 8, 2024.

=== Bay FC ===
On August 28, 2024, Bay FC acquired Silkowitz in exchange for Kayla Sharples and $15,000 in allocation money. She signed a two-year contract extension the following month.

Bay's starting goalkeeper job opened up after previous starter Katelyn Rowland retired during the 2025 preseason. Silkowitz earned the job and made her NWSL debut in a season-opening 1–1 draw with the Utah Royals on March 15, 2025. The following week, she kept her first NWSL clean sheet in a 2–0 home win over Racing Louisville. On May 4, she faced her first NWSL penalty and denied the effort from María Sánchez, but Bay lost 2–1 to the San Diego Wave. On August 5, she signed a contract extension through 2027, with the club option to extend to 2028. On October 17, she allowed a hat trick to Manaka Matsukubo even after stopping a penalty from the player in a 4–1 loss to the North Carolina Courage. She started 24 games and ranked top five in the league in saves, shots faced on target, and goals allowed. Her performances earned a league-leading 13 nominations for NWSL Save of the Week, winning the award 3 times.

== International career ==
Silkowitz was called up to the United States under-23 team as an overage player in May 2025. She made her international debut in a 2–1 loss to Germany U-23 on June 2, 2025. In November 2025, Emma Hayes gave Silkowitz her first call-up to the senior national team before a pair of friendlies against Italy.

== Honors and awards ==
Individual

- Big Ten all-freshman team: 2019
