= Jordyn Bloomer =

American soccer player (born 1997)

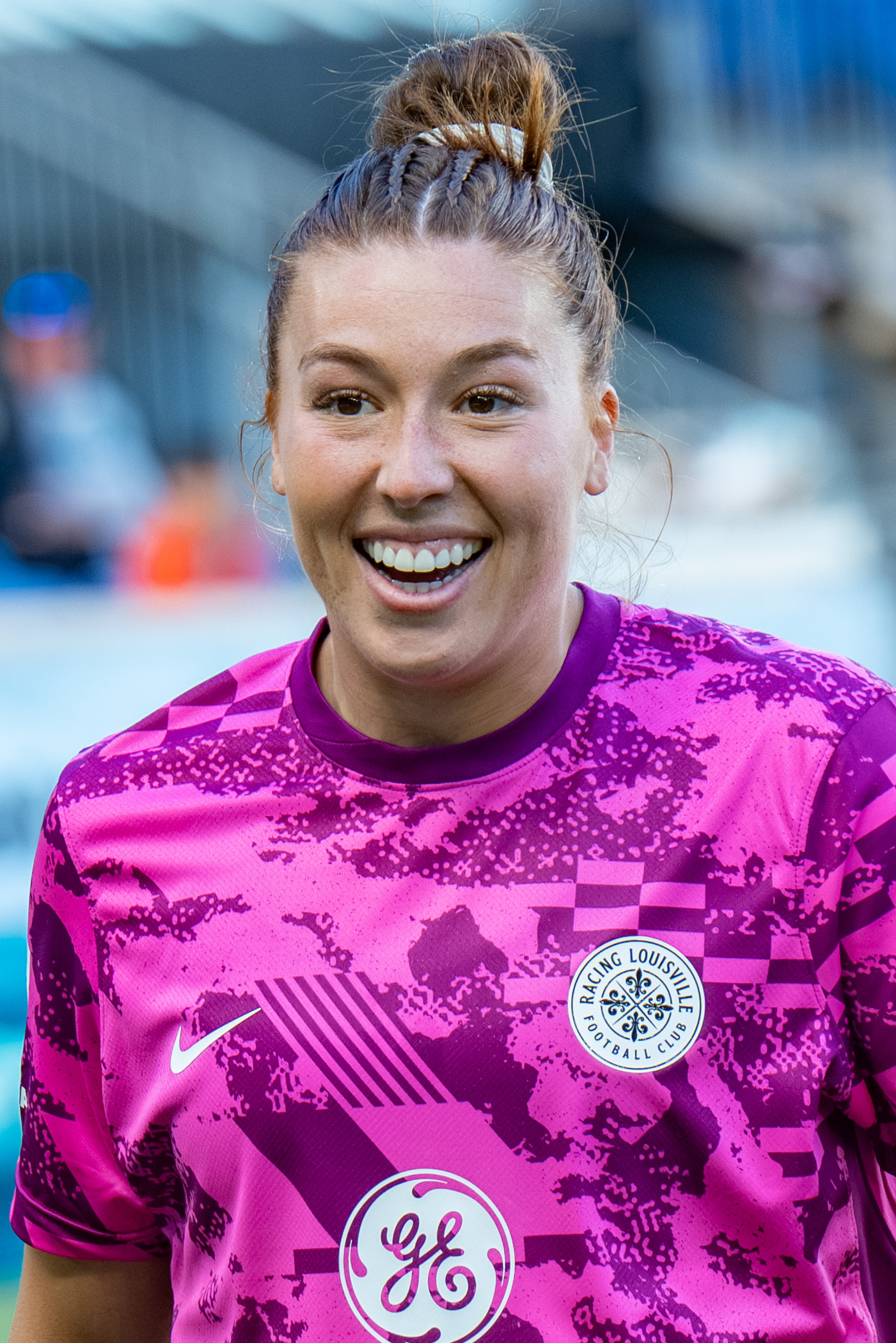
- Bloomer with Racing Louisville in 2026

Personal information
- Full name: Jordyn Rebecca Bloomer
- Date of birth: October 14, 1997 (age 29)
- Height: 5 ft 8 in (1.73 m)
- Position: Goalkeeper

Team information
- Current team: Racing Louisville FC
- Number: 24

Youth career
- FC Wisconsin Eclipse

College career
Years	Team	Apps	(Gls)
2016–2021	Wisconsin Badgers	82	(0)

Senior career*
Years	Team	Apps	(Gls)
2022–	Racing Louisville FC	47	(0)
2022–2023	→ Western Sydney; Wanderers (loan)	14	(0)

International career
2015	United States U19		
- * Club domestic league appearances and goals as of 05:54, November 2, 2026 (UTC)

Jordyn Rebecca Bloomer (born October 14, 1997) is an American professional soccer player who plays as a goalkeeper for Racing Louisville of the National Women's Soccer League (NWSL). She played college soccer for the Wisconsin Badgers, earning first-team All-American honors in 2019.

== Early life ==
Raised in Hartland, Wisconsin, Bloomer attended Arrowhead High School. She played ECNL club soccer for FC Wisconsin Eclipse. She committed to Wisconsin during her sophomore year.

== College career ==
Bloomer spent her first two years with the Wisconsin Badgers as a backup to Caitlyn Clem. She became the primary keeper in the 2018 season, starting all 22 games and keeping 8 clean sheets. She had two shutouts in the NCAA tournament before falling to Stanford. She had a breakout 2019 season with 12 shutouts in 22 games, helping the Badgers go undefeated to win the Big Ten Conference regular-season title and again reaching the NCAA tournament round of 16. After the season, she was named first-team All-Big Ten, first-team All-American, and the Big Ten Goalkeeper of the Year.

Bloomer kept 7 clean sheets in 14 games in the 2020 season (pushed to the following spring due to the COVID-19 pandemic). She was named first-team All-Big Ten, second-team All-American, and the Big Ten Goalkeeper of the Year. Despite reaching the Big Ten tournament final, the Badgers missed the NCAA tournament. In her fourth and final season as a starter in 2021, she recorded 9 shutouts in 22 games and again made the third round of the NCAA tournament.

== Club career ==
Bloomer was drafted 26th overall by Racing Louisville FC in the 2022 NWSL Draft and signed to a one-year contract with an option for another year. She made her professional debut on April 24, 2022, starting in Racing's last 2022 NWSL Challenge Cup game against the Houston Dash.

After her rookie season, Bloomer joined Australian side Western Sydney Wanderers on loan in October 2022. She played 14 games for the Wanderers and kept 4 clean sheets.

Bloomer played for Racing in one game in the 2023 preseason before suffering a season-ending back injury later in the spring. She signed a new one-year deal with another year option after the 2023 season.

Bloomer made two starts for Racing in the 2024 NWSL x Liga MX Femenil Summer Cup. The following January, she signed a new two-year contract.

== International career ==
Bloomer was called up to the United States under-19 team in 2015.

== Career statistics ==
As of March 26, 2023

Appearances and goals by club, season and competition
Club	Season	League			Cup (Note: Includes the NWSL Challenge Cup)		Playoffs (Note: Includes NWSL Playoffs and A-League Women Finals series)		Total	
Club	Season	Division	Apps	Goals	Apps	Goals	Apps	Goals	Apps	Goals
Racing Louisville FC	2022	NWSL	0	0	1	0	—		1	0
Racing Louisville FC	2023	NWSL	0	0	0	0	—		0	0
Western Sydney Wanderers FC	2022–23	A-League	14	0	—		—		14	0
Career total			14	0	1	0	0	0	15	0
