= Mandy McGlynn =

American soccer player (born 1998)

- McGlynn in 2026

Personal information
- Birth name: Amanda Kathleen McGlynn
- Date of birth: November 3, 1998 (age 28)
- Place of birth: Jacksonville, Florida, U.S.
- Height: 5 ft 9 in (1.75 m)
- Position: Goalkeeper

Team information
- Current team: Utah Royals
- Number: 1

College career
Years	Team	Apps	(Gls)
2016–2019	Virginia Tech Hokies		

Senior career*
Years	Team	Apps	(Gls)
2020–2021	NJ/NY Gotham FC	1	(0)
2021–2022	Piteå IF	26	(0)
2023	NJ/NY Gotham FC	11	(0)
2024–	Utah Royals	72	(0)

International career^{‡}
2017–2018	United States U20		
2024–	United States	6	(0)
- * Club domestic league appearances and goals as of 04:21, November 10, 2026 (UTC) ‡ National team caps and goals as of June 6, 2026

Amanda Kathleen McGlynn (formerly Haught; born November 3, 1998) is an American professional soccer player who plays as a goalkeeper for the Utah Royals of the National Women's Soccer League and the United States national team. She previously played for NJ/NY Gotham FC, winning the 2023 NWSL Championship. She played college soccer for the Virginia Tech Hokies.

== College career ==
Growing up in the American South, McGlynn attended Sandalwood High School in Jacksonville, Florida and received a scholarship to play soccer at Virginia Tech. She started as a goalkeeper during her four seasons of soccer at Virginia Tech, where she was a back-to-back All-ACC first-team goalkeeper.

== Club career ==
Mandy McGlynn with the Utah Royals 2026

McGlynn registered for the 2020 NWSL College Draft in January 2020. Sky Blue FC selected her with the 20th overall pick.

=== NJ/NY Gotham FC (2020–2021) ===
The 2020 NWSL season was cancelled due to the impact of the COVID-19 pandemic on sports. McGlynn signed a one-year contract with Sky Blue FC in June 2020, joining the team for the 2020 NWSL Challenge Cup tournament.

McGlynn made her NWSL debut in a 1–1 draw against Kansas City NWSL on July 3, 2021. The match was her only appearance of the season.

=== Piteå IF (2021–2022) ===
On December 15, 2021, Gotham FC announced that McGlynn had signed with Piteå IF of the Swedish Damallsvenskan but would retain her rights to play in the NWSL until the 2024 NWSL pre-season. Piteå signed McGlynn to replace departing goalkeeper Guro Pettersen.

McGlynn appeared in all 26 of the team's matches in the 2022 Damallsvenskan, conceding 26 goals and being credited with 9 clean sheets. Piteå finished the season in 7th place. She announced in October that she would leave the team and return to the United States to get married. Before leaving, McGlynn was awarded the 2022 Norrstjärnan award as the top women's footballer in Norrbotten County.

=== NJ/NY Gotham FC (2023) ===
McGlynn signed a two-year contract with NJ/NY Gotham FC on January 6, 2023. In August, she became the team's starting keeper after Abby Smith's season-ending injury. In the 2023 NWSL Championship, McGlynn was sent off in the 90+7th minute for handling the ball outside the penalty box. Outfield player Nealy Martin replaced her in net as Gotham held on to claim the championship 2–1 against OL Reign.

=== Utah Royals (2024–) ===
McGlynn was traded to Utah Royals in December 2023. She had a breakout 2024 season starting 24 regular-season games and making 84 saves (fourth in the league), earning a nomination for NWSL Goalkeeper of the Year. Utah signed McGlynn to a five-year contract extension after the season, keeping with the team until 2029, the longest active contract in the NWSL.

McGlynn registered her first career assist on March 15, 2025, playing a long ball to newly signed Bianca St-Georges who finished against Bay FC in the season opener, which finished 1–1.

== International career ==
McGlynn has represented the United States youth national team at the under-18 and the under-20 levels.

McGlynn received her first senior national team call up on October 25, 2024, to replace an injured Jane Campbell for the team's Olympic gold medal victory tour. She made her senior team debut a few days later on October 30, starting in a friendly against Argentina and keeping a clean sheet to secure a 3–0 victory.

== Personal life ==
In January 2021, McGlynn announced her engagement to Tommy Haught, who proposed to her in Jacksonville Beach, Florida. The couple had been dating since October 2019. The two married on December 1, 2022. In early 2025, she returned to using her maiden name, McGlynn. Since 2025, she has been in a relationship with teammate Ana Tejada.

== Career statistics ==
=== Club ===
As of May 23, 2025

Appearances and goals by club, season and competition
Club	Season	League			Cup (Note: Includes the NWSL Challenge Cup, Svenska Cupen, & NWSL x Liga MX Femenil Summer Cup.)		Playoffs (Note: Includes NWSL Playoffs.)		Other		Total	
Club	Season	Division	Apps	Goals	Apps	Goals	Apps	Goals	Apps	Goals	Apps	Goals
NJ/NY Gotham FC	2020	NWSL	—		0	0	—		—		0	0
NJ/NY Gotham FC	2021	NWSL	1	0	0	0	—		—		1	0
Piteå IF	2021-22	Damallsvenskan	0	0	1	0	—		—		27	0
Piteå IF	2022-23	Damallsvenskan	26	0	2	0	—		—		2	0
NJ/NY Gotham FC	2023	NWSL	10	0	4	0	3	0			17	0
Utah Royals	2024	NWSL	24	0	1	0	—		1	0	26	0
Utah Royals	2025	NWSL	10	0	—		—		—		10	0
Career total			71	0	8	0	3	0	1	0	83	0

=== International ===
As of match played June 6, 2026, 2026

National Team	Year	Apps	Goals
United States	2024	1	0
United States	2025	3	0
United States	2026	2	0
Total		6	0

== Honors ==
United States

- SheBelieves Cup: 2026
