= Shelby Hogan =

American soccer player (born 1998)

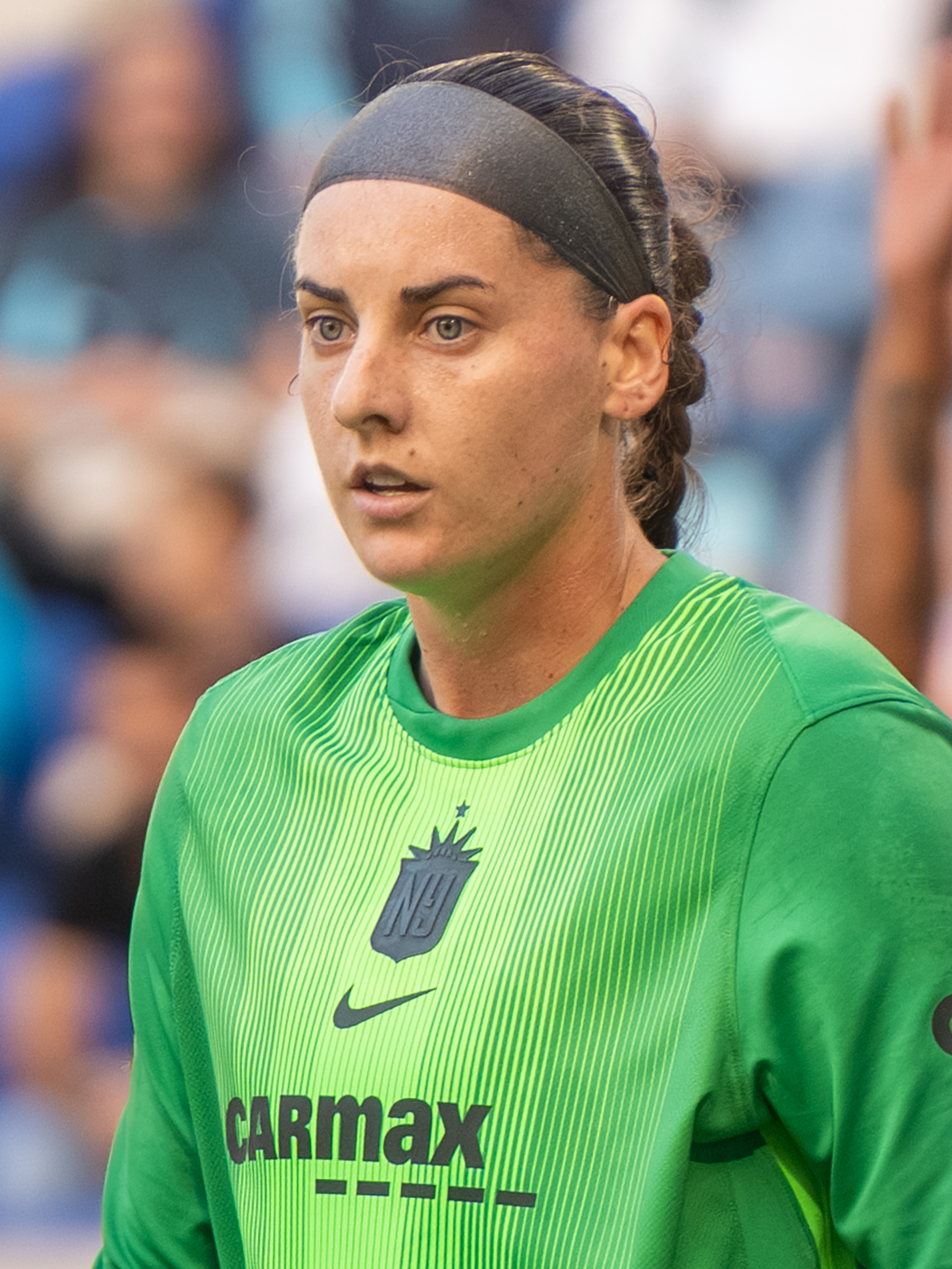
- Hogan with Gotham FC in 2025

Personal information
- Full name: Shelby Ann Hogan
- Date of birth: May 10, 1998 (age 28)
- Place of birth: Franklin, Massachusetts, United States
- Height: 5 ft 10 in (1.78 m)
- Position: Goalkeeper

Youth career
- 2013–2016: Bishop Feehan High School
- FC Stars

College career
Years	Team	Apps	(Gls)
2016–2019	Providence Friars	60	(0)

Senior career*
Years	Team	Apps	(Gls)
2021–2024	Portland Thorns	23	(0)
2025–	Gotham FC	5	(0)

International career
2016	United States U18		
2022	United States U23		
- * Club domestic league appearances and goals as of November 1, 2026

Shelby Ann Hogan (born May 10, 1998) is an American professional soccer player who plays as a goalkeeper for Gotham FC of the National Women's Soccer League (NWSL). She played college soccer for the Providence Friars and began her professional career with the Portland Thorns in 2021.

== Youth career ==
Hogan was raised in Franklin, Massachusetts, where she graduated from Bishop Feehan High School in Attleboro, Massachusetts. She also played youth club soccer for FC Stars of the Elite Clubs National League.

== College career ==
Hogan played for the Providence Friars women's soccer team from 2016 to 2019. She was named Big East Conference co-Freshman of the Year in 2017 for starting 20 matches for the Friars and maintaining a 1.05 average goals conceded with seven shutouts. She was also named 2019 Big East Goalkeeper of the Year and to the all-conference first team. She initially planned to return to the team in 2020 but instead turned professional.

Hogan graduated from Providence in December 2020 with a bachelor's of science degree.

== Club career ==
In February 2021, Hogan signed with NWSL club Portland Thorns FC. She made her friendly debut against fellow NWSL club Houston Dash in the 2021 Women's International Champions Cup. In the semi-final, Hogan saved three shots in the penalty shoot-out to send the Thorns to the championship match, and in the final, earned a shutout in the Thorns' 1-0 victory.

On January 27, 2023, the Thorns re-signed Hogan to a three-year contract with an option for an additional year.

The Thorns traded Hogan and $40,000 of NWSL allocation money to Gotham FC in exchange for intra-league transfer funds and a 2025 international slot on December 31, 2024.

== International career ==
Hogan was a member of the United States women's national under-18 soccer team and invited to the under-20 team's training camp in 2017. In June 2022, the United States named her to the under-23 team roster for the Three Nations Tournament against India and Sweden, where Hogan recorded a shutout win over Sweden on June 28.

== Honors ==
Portland Thorns FC

- NWSL Championship: 2022
- NWSL Shield: 2021
- NWSL Challenge Cup: 2021
- International Champions Cup: 2021

Gotham FC

- NWSL Championship: 2025
- NWSL Shield: 2026
- NWSL Challenge Cup: 2026
- CONCACAF W Champions Cup: 2024–25
