= Jane Campbell (soccer) =

American soccer player (born 1995)

- Campbell with the Houston Dash in 2026

Personal information
- Full name: Carolyn Jane Campbell
- Date of birth: February 17, 1995 (age 31)
- Place of birth: Kennesaw, Georgia, U.S.
- Height: 5 ft 9 in (1.75 m)
- Position: Goalkeeper

Team information
- Current team: Houston Dash
- Number: 1

Youth career
- 2008–2010: North Atlanta Soccer Association
- 2011–2012: Concorde Fire South

College career
Years	Team	Apps	(Gls)
2013–2016	Stanford Cardinal	84	(0)

Senior career*
Years	Team	Apps	(Gls)
2017–	Houston Dash	197	(0)

International career^{‡}
2008–2010	United States U15		
2011–2012	United States U17	8	(0)
2013–2014	United States U20	0	(0)
2015–2018	United States U23	1	(0)
2017–	United States	10	(0)
Medal record
Olympic Games
Bronze medal – third place	2020 Tokyo	Team
CONCACAF W Gold Cup
Winner	2024 United States
- * Club domestic league appearances and goals as of 03:11, November 8, 2026 (UTC) ‡ National team caps and goals as of 3 August 2025

Carolyn Jane Campbell (born February 17, 1995) is an American professional soccer player who plays as a goalkeeper for the Houston Dash of the National Women's Soccer League (NWSL) and the United States national team.

Campbell played college soccer for the Stanford Cardinal and was selected by Houston in the 2017 NWSL College Draft. With Houston, she won the 2020NWSL Challenge Cup and was named NWSL Goalkeeper of the Year and NWSL Best XI First Team goalkeeper in 2023. She earned a bronze medal with the United States at the 2020 Summer Olympic and was selected as an alternate for the 2024 Summer Olympics.

== Early life ==
Campbell grew up in Kennesaw, Georgia, and attended Darlington School in Rome, Georgia. She played club soccer with North Atlanta Soccer Association and later Concorde Fire South. In 2011, she was named NSCAA Youth Girls Player of the Year and was a two-time NSCAA Youth All- American.

Campbell attended Stanford University from 2013 to 2016 and played for the Stanford Cardinal. She appeared in 84 matches for Stanford, recorded 14 shutouts in 2014, and finished first in program history in goalkeeping minutes played.

== Club career ==
Campbell was selected by the Houston Dash with the 15th overall pick in the 2017 NWSL Draft. She made her Dash debut on April 22, 2017, away against Seattle Reign FC, and was later named a finalist for the 2017 NWSL Rookie of the Year award.

In 2020, Campbell was part of the Houston Dash team that won the NWSL Challenge Cup. During the tournament, she recorded four clean sheets and made two penalty-kick saves in the quarterfinal shootout against Utah Royals FC.

Campbell played every minute of the 2023 regular season. She recorded eight shootouts in 22 regular-season matches, led by the league with 93 saves, and was named NWSL Goalkeeper of the Year. She was also selected as the goalkeeper of the 2023 NWSL Best XI First Team.

On May 5, 2024, Campbell made 12 saves in a 1-1 draw against the Kansas City Current, matching the NWSL single-game saves record. On June 20, 2024, she signed a contract with Houston through the 2027 season, with an option for 2028.

In November 2025, Campbell became the third goalkeeper in NWSL history to reach 600 saves and reached 15,000 career minutes. Houston stated that she was the only NWSL goalkeeper to reach both marks with one club.

== Coaching Career ==
In 2025, Campbell joined the Rice University women's soccer staff as a volunteer coach ahead of the 2025 season.

== International career ==
Campbell was a member of the US team that won the 2012 CONCACAF Women's U-17 Championship in Guatemala and qualified for the Azerbaijan 2012 FIFA U-17 Women's World Cup. In Guatemala, Campbell started and played every minute of all five games; had all shutout games, and made one assist during the tournament on a goal by Andi Sullivan off a booming punt against Trinidad and Tobago women's national football team.

Campbell is undefeated in her U-17 national team career with nine wins, 3 draws and no loss. Campbell first played for U-17 national team at the age of 15; and she attended United States women's national under-23 soccer team training camp in October 2011 as a 16-year-old.

On January 22, 2013, Campbell was called to the national training camp for the first time by head coach Tom Sermanni, to train with the team who were training for a friendly match ahead of the 2013 Algarve Cup, becoming the youngest goalkeeper to be called up to the senior national team. She made her senior team debut in April 2017 in a friendly against Russia, coming on as a second-half substitute for Ashlyn Harris.

On August 23, 2018, she was named to the United States U-23 team for the 2018 Nordic tournament.

Campbell was a member of the national team at the 2020 Summer Olympics. Although she did not appear in any games in Tokyo, she won a bronze medal as a member of the team.

Campbell was named as an alternate to the national team for the 2024 Summer Olympics in France.

In 2025, Campbell started the United States 2-0 win against Colombia in the SheBelieves Cup and recorded her sixth international shutout.

In April 2026, Campbell was named to the United States roster for three friendlies against Japan.

== Personal life ==
Campbell was on Headmaster's List in 2010 and was a member of the National Honor Society in 2012. Both of her parents are former Navy fighter pilots, and both parents were collegiate athletes. Her mother Chrystal rowed crew at the Naval Academy and her father Mike played hockey and rowed crew at Wesleyan University in Middletown, Connecticut. She followed the footsteps of her grandfather and great-great-grandfather to Stanford University in 2013.

Campbell married retired professional women's soccer player Christine Nairn in December 2023.

== Career statistics ==
=== International ===
As of match played February 26, 2025

National Team	Year	Apps	Goals
United States	2017	2	0
United States	2018	1	0
United States	2019	0	0
United States	2020	0	0
United States	2021	4	0
United States	2022	0	0
United States	2023	0	0
United States	2024	1	0
United States	2025	2	0
Total		10	0

== Honors ==
United States

- CONCACAF W Gold Cup: 2024
- SheBelieves Cup: 2024

Houston Dash

- NWSL Challenge Cup: 2020

Individual

- NWSL Goalkeeper of the Year: 2023
- NWSL Best XI: 2023
- NWSL Best XI Second Team: 2026
- Pac-12 Conference Goalkeeper of the Year: 2015
