= 2020 NWSL Challenge Cup squads =

The 2020 NWSL Challenge Cup was a one-off tournament during the 2020 National Women's Soccer League season to mark the league's return to action from the COVID-19 pandemic.

NWSL teams were required to submit finalized rosters to participate in the 2020 NWSL Challenge Cup on June 21. Roster sizes were required to be a minimum of 22 players and maximum of 28 players (24 senior players + 4 supplemental players) and contain at least three goalkeepers. Only players listed on that final roster will be permitted to participate in the tournament. Furthermore, teams could sign a maximum of 4 players they had the rights to but were not yet under contract to short-term contracts lasting the duration of the tournament. Short-term loans from teams outside the NWSL were also permissible.

Squads were announced on June 23, 2020. 22 of the 32 federation players were included in the squads.

The age listed is as of June 27, 2020, the first day of the tournament. Flags indicate national team as defined under FIFA eligibility rules. Players may hold more than one non-FIFA nationality.

== Chicago Red Stars ==
The final 28-player roster was announced on June 23, 2020.

Head coach: (United States) Rory Dames

No.	Nationality	Name	Position(s)	Date of birth (age)	Designation
Goalkeepers
1	(United States)	Alyssa Naeher	GK	April 20, 1988 (aged 32)	Federation
21	(United States)	Emily Boyd	GK	July 25, 1996 (aged 23)	
38	(United States)	Cassie Miller	GK	April 28, 1995 (aged 25)	
Defenders
6	(United States)	Casey Short	DF	August 23, 1990 (aged 29)	Federation
8	(United States)	Julie Ertz	DF	April 6, 1992 (aged 28)	Federation
11	(United States)	Sarah Gorden	DF	September 13, 1992 (aged 27)	
14	(United States)	Zoe Morse	DF	April 1, 1998 (aged 22)	
16	(United States)	Camryn Biegalski	DF	August 11, 1998 (aged 21)	
23	(United States)	Julia Bingham	DF	May 25, 1998 (aged 22)	
26	(United States)	Tierna Davidson	DF	September 19, 1998 (aged 21)	Federation
28	(United States)	Kayla Sharples	DF	June 17, 1997 (aged 23)	
29	(Canada)	Bianca St. Georges	DF	July 28, 1997 (aged 22)	
30	(United States)	Hannah Davison	DF	April 9, 1997 (aged 23)	
32	(United States)	Zoey Goralski	DF	January 22, 1995 (aged 25)	
Midfielders
9	(United States)	Savannah McCaskill	MF	July 31, 1996 (aged 23)	
10	(United States)	Vanessa DiBernardo	MF	May 15, 1992 (aged 28)	
12	(Japan)	Yūki Nagasato	MF	July 15, 1987 (aged 32)	International
13	(United States)	Morgan Gautrat	MF	February 26, 1993 (aged 27)	Federation
18	(United States)	Ella Stevens	MF	December 11, 1997 (aged 22)	
24	(United States)	Danielle Colaprico	MF	May 6, 1993 (aged 27)	
25	(United States)	Cassie Rohan	MF	February 28, 1998 (aged 22)	
Forwards
2	(United States)	Kealia Watt	FW	January 31, 1992 (aged 28)	
5	(United States)	Rachel Hill	FW	April 17, 1995 (aged 25)	
7	(United States)	Michele Vasconcelos	FW	May 11, 1994 (aged 26)	
15	(United States)	Makenzy Doniak	FW	February 25, 1994 (aged 26)	
19	(United States)	Sarah Luebbert	FW	December 16, 1997 (aged 22)	
22	(United States)	Zoe Redei	FW	October 8, 1997 (aged 22)	
33	(Mexico)	Katie Johnson	FW	September 14, 1994 (aged 25)	

== Houston Dash ==
The final 24-player roster was announced on June 23, 2020.

Head coach: (England) James Clarkson

No.	Nationality	Name	Position(s)	Date of birth (age)	Designation
Goalkeepers
1	(United States)	Jane Campbell	GK	February 17, 1995 (aged 25)	
20	(United States)	Lindsey Harris	GK	November 13, 1993 (aged 26)	
99	(United States)	Amanda Dennis	GK	May 25, 1998 (aged 22)	
Defenders
2	(Canada)	Allysha Chapman	DF	January 25, 1989 (aged 31)	Federation
11	(United States)	Megan Oyster	DF	September 3, 1992 (aged 27)	
17	(United States)	Erin Simon	DF	August 19, 1994 (aged 25)	
23	(United States)	Ally Prisock	DF	January 18, 1997 (aged 23)	
25	(United States)	Katie Naughton	DF	February 15, 1994 (aged 26)	
Midfielders
5	(United States)	CeCe Kizer	MF	August 7, 1997 (aged 22)	
6	(United States)	Shea Groom	MF	March 4, 1993 (aged 27)	
9	(United States)	Haley Hanson	MF	February 22, 1996 (aged 24)	
10	(United States)	Christine Nairn	MF	September 25, 1990 (aged 29)	
13	(Canada)	Sophie Schmidt	MF	June 28, 1988 (aged 31)	Federation
14	(United States)	Brianna Visalli	MF	April 17, 1995 (aged 25)	
19	(United States)	Kristie Mewis	MF	February 25, 1991 (aged 29)	
28	(United States)	Cami Privett	MF	March 16, 1993 (aged 27)	
Forwards
3	(England)	Rachel Daly	FW	December 6, 1991 (aged 28)	International
4	(Canada)	Maegan Kelly	FW	February 19, 1992 (aged 28)	
7	(United States)	Katie Stengel	FW	February 29, 1992 (aged 28)	
8	(Canada)	Nichelle Prince	FW	February 19, 1995 (aged 25)	Federation
12	(United States)	Veronica Latsko	FW	December 12, 1995 (aged 24)	
16	(Jamaica)	Kayla McCoy	FW	September 3, 1996 (aged 23)	
24	(United States)	Jamia Fields	FW	September 24, 1993 (aged 26)	
26	(United States)	Bridgette Andrzejewski	FW	January 27, 1997 (aged 23)	

== North Carolina Courage ==
The final 25-player roster was announced on June 23, 2020.

Head coach: (England) Paul Riley

No.	Nationality	Name	Position(s)	Date of birth (age)	Designation
Goalkeepers
0	(United States)	Katelyn Rowland	GK	March 16, 1994 (aged 26)	
1	(Canada)	Stephanie Labbé	GK	October 10, 1986 (aged 33)	Federation
42	(United States)	Samantha Murphy	GK	April 21, 1997 (aged 23)	
Defenders
3	(United States)	Kaleigh Kurtz	DF	September 9, 1994 (aged 25)	
6	(New Zealand)	Abby Erceg	DF	November 20, 1989 (aged 30)	
7	(United States)	Abby Dahlkemper	DF	May 13, 1993 (aged 27)	Federation
13	(United States)	Ryan Williams	DF	February 23, 1996 (aged 24)	
15	(United States)	Jaelene Daniels	DF	May 28, 1993 (aged 27)	
16	(United States)	Hailie Mace	DF	March 24, 1997 (aged 23)	
20	(Canada)	Lindsay Agnew	DF	March 31, 1995 (aged 25)	
22	(United States)	Hailey Harbison	DF	October 3, 1996 (aged 23)	
26	(United States)	Sinclaire Miramontez	DF	April 11, 1998 (aged 22)	
27	(United States)	Addisyn Merrick	DF	March 4, 1998 (aged 22)	
Midfielders
2	(United States)	Lauren Milliet	MF	December 1, 1996 (aged 23)	
5	(United States)	Sam Mewis	MF	October 9, 1992 (aged 27)	Federation
8	(Republic of Ireland)	Denise O'Sullivan	MF	February 4, 1994 (aged 26)	International
10	(Brazil)	Debinha	MF	October 20, 1991 (aged 28)	International
19	(United States)	Crystal Dunn	MF	July 3, 1992 (aged 27)	Federation
21	(United States)	Cari Roccaro	MF	July 18, 1994 (aged 25)	
25	(United States)	Meredith Speck	MF	February 1, 1993 (aged 27)	
Forwards
4	(United States)	McKenzie Meehan	FW	December 25, 1994 (aged 25)	
9	(United States)	Lynn Williams	FW	May 21, 1993 (aged 27)	
14	(United States)	Jessica McDonald	FW	February 28, 1988 (aged 32)	
17	(United States)	Ally Watt	FW	March 12, 1997 (aged 23)	
23	(United States)	Kristen Hamilton	FW	April 17, 1992 (aged 28)	

== OL Reign ==
The final 28-player roster was announced on June 23, 2020.

Head coach: (France) Farid Benstiti

No.	Nationality	Name	Position(s)	Date of birth (age)	Designation
Goalkeepers
1	(United States)	Michelle Betos	GK	February 20, 1988 (aged 32)	
26	(United States)	Casey Murphy	GK	April 25, 1996 (aged 24)	
27	(United States)	Carly Nelson	GK	February 11, 1998 (aged 22)	
Defenders
2	(United States)	Amber Brooks	DF	January 23, 1991 (aged 29)	
3	(United States)	Lauren Barnes	DF	May 31, 1989 (aged 31)	
4	(United States)	Alana Cook	DF	April 11, 1997 (aged 23)	Loan
13	(Spain)	Celia Jiménez Delgado	DF	June 20, 1995 (aged 25)	International
14	(United States)	Stephanie Cox	DF	April 3, 1986 (aged 34)	
19	(United States)	Kristen McNabb	DF	April 17, 1994 (aged 26)	
23	(United States)	Taylor Smith	DF	December 1, 1993 (aged 26)	
29	(United States)	Adrienne Jordan	DF	January 30, 1994 (aged 26)	
30	(United States)	Machaela George	DF	October 3, 1997 (aged 22)	
99	(United States)	Madison Hammond	DF	November 15, 1997 (aged 22)	
Midfielders
5	(Canada)	Quinn (Note: Then known as Rebecca Quinn)	MF	August 11, 1995 (aged 24)	International
6	(United States)	Allie Long	MF	August 13, 1987 (aged 32)	Federation
10	(Wales)	Jess Fishlock	MF	January 14, 1987 (aged 33)	
12	(United States)	Morgan Andrews	MF	March 25, 1995 (aged 25)	
17	(United States)	Dani Weatherholt	MF	March 17, 1994 (aged 26)	
25	(United States)	Kelcie Hedge	MF	September 19, 1997 (aged 22)	
28	(Costa Rica)	Shirley Cruz	MF	August 28, 1985 (aged 34)	International
31	(New Zealand)	Rosie White	MF	June 6, 1993 (aged 27)	International
Forwards
9	(England)	Jodie Taylor	FW	May 17, 1986 (aged 34)	
11	(United States)	Darian Jenkins	FW	January 5, 1995 (aged 25)	
18	(United States)	Mariah Lee	FW	June 30, 1995 (aged 24)	
20	(United States)	Sofia Huerta	FW	December 14, 1992 (aged 27)	
21	(Japan)	Nicole Momiki	FW	April 9, 1996 (aged 24)	
22	(United States)	Jasmyne Spencer	FW	August 27, 1990 (aged 29)	
24	(United States)	Bethany Balcer	FW	March 7, 1997 (aged 23)	

== Portland Thorns FC ==
The final 25-player roster was announced on June 23, 2020.

Head coach: (England) Mark Parsons

No.	Nationality	Name	Position(s)	Date of birth (age)	Designation
Goalkeepers
24	(United States)	Adrianna Franch	GK	November 2, 1990 (aged 29)	Federation
31	(United States)	Bella Bixby	GK	November 20, 1995 (aged 24)	
33	(United States)	Britt Eckerstrom	GK	May 28, 1993 (aged 27)	
Defenders
2	(United States)	Katherine Reynolds	DF	September 14, 1987 (aged 32)	
4	(United States)	Becky Sauerbrunn	DF	June 6, 1985 (aged 35)	Federation
5	(United States)	Emily Menges	DF	July 28, 1992 (aged 27)	
15	(United States)	Madison Pogarch	DF	November 5, 1997 (aged 22)	
18	(United States)	Christen Westphal	DF	September 2, 1993 (aged 26)	
20	(United States)	Kelli Hubly	DF	August 9, 1994 (aged 25)	
25	(United States)	Meghan Klingenberg	DF	August 2, 1988 (aged 31)	
39	(United States)	Meaghan Nally	DF	June 30, 1998 (aged 21)	
43	(United States)	Autumn Smithers	DF	November 4, 1997 (aged 22)	
Midfielders
10	(United States)	Lindsey Horan	MF	May 26, 1994 (aged 26)	Federation
11	(Costa Rica)	Raquel Rodríguez	MF	October 28, 1993 (aged 26)	International
30	(United States)	Celeste Boureille	MF	April 20, 1994 (aged 26)	
35	(United States)	Gabby Seiler	MF	September 14, 1994 (aged 25)	
36	(United States)	Angela Salem	MF	July 24, 1988 (aged 31)	
37	(United States)	Emily Ogle	MF	August 5, 1996 (aged 23)	
Forwards
9	(United States)	Sophia Smith	FW	August 10, 2000 (aged 19)	
12	(Canada)	Christine Sinclair	FW	June 12, 1983 (aged 37)	Federation
22	(United States)	Morgan Weaver	FW	October 18, 1997 (aged 22)	
34	(United States)	Tyler Lussi	FW	January 26, 1995 (aged 25)	
38	(United States)	Simone Charley	FW	February 4, 1995 (aged 25)	
40	(United States)	Marissa Everett	FW	August 29, 1997 (aged 22)	
41	(United States)	Anika Rodriguez	FW	January 1, 1997 (aged 23)	

== Sky Blue FC ==
The final 26-player roster was announced on June 23, 2020.

Head coach: (England) Freya Coombe

No.	Nationality	Name	Position(s)	Date of birth (age)	Designation
Goalkeepers
1	(Canada)	Kailen Sheridan	GK	July 16, 1995 (aged 24)	Federation
13	(Bosnia and Herzegovina)	DiDi Haracic	GK	April 12, 1992 (aged 28)	
21	(United States)	Mandy McGlynn	GK	November 3, 1998 (aged 21)	
35	(United States)	Megan Hinz	GK	December 4, 1995 (aged 24)	
Defenders
2	(United States)	Kaleigh Riehl	DF	October 21, 1996 (aged 23)	
8	(United States)	Erica Skroski	DF	February 14, 1991 (aged 29)	
12	(United States)	Gina Lewandowski	DF	April 13, 1985 (aged 35)	
15	(Mexico)	Sabrina Flores	DF	January 31, 1996 (aged 24)	
22	(United States)	Mandy Freeman	DF	March 23, 1995 (aged 25)	
24	(Cameroon)	Estelle Johnson	DF	July 21, 1988 (aged 31)	
26	(Jamaica)	Chantelle Swaby	DF	August 6, 1998 (aged 21)	
Midfielders
5	(United States)	Nicole Baxter	MF	May 12, 1994 (aged 26)	
6	(Ghana)	Jennifer Cudjoe	MF	March 7, 1994 (aged 26)	International
7	(United States)	McCall Zerboni	MF	December 13, 1986 (aged 33)	
9	(Japan)	Nahomi Kawasumi	MF	September 23, 1985 (aged 34)	International
14	(United States)	Kenie Wright	MF	August 14, 1997 (aged 22)	
16	(United States)	Sarah Woldmoe	MF	July 27, 1992 (aged 27)	
17	(United States)	Domi Richardson	MF	October 18, 1992 (aged 27)	
18	(United States)	Cassidy Benintente	MF	June 12, 1994 (aged 26)	
19	(United States)	Elizabeth Eddy	MF	September 13, 1991 (aged 28)	
23	(United States)	Midge Purce	MF	September 18, 1995 (aged 24)	
73	(United States)	Madison Tiernan	MF	July 3, 1995 (aged 24)	
Forwards
4	(United States)	Paige Monaghan	FW	November 13, 1996 (aged 23)	
20	(Canada)	Evelyne Viens	FW	February 6, 1997 (aged 23)	International
25	(United States)	Ifeoma Onumonu	FW	February 25, 1994 (aged 26)	
28	(United States)	Imani Dorsey	FW	March 21, 1996 (aged 24)	

== Utah Royals FC ==
The final 28-player roster was announced on June 23, 2020.

Head coach: (England) Craig Harrington

No.	Nationality	Name	Position(s)	Date of birth (age)	Designation
Goalkeepers
1	(United States)	Abby Smith	GK	October 4, 1993 (aged 26)	
18	(United States)	Nicole Barnhart	GK	October 10, 1981 (aged 38)	
61	(United States)	Melissa Lowder	GK	January 29, 1997 (aged 23)	
Defenders
2	(Scotland)	Rachel Corsie	DF	August 17, 1989 (aged 30)	
5	(United States)	Kelley O'Hara	DF	August 4, 1988 (aged 31)	Federation
6	(New Zealand)	Katie Bowen	DF	April 15, 1994 (aged 26)	
7	(United States)	Elizabeth Ball	DF	October 20, 1995 (aged 24)	
14	(United States)	Gaby Vincent	DF	December 7, 1997 (aged 22)	
19	(United States)	Michelle Maemone	DF	March 18, 1997 (aged 23)	
20	(United States)	Mallory Weber	DF	April 4, 1994 (aged 26)	
22	(United States)	Madeline Nolf	DF	March 29, 1996 (aged 24)	
24	(United States)	Taylor Leach	DF	January 19, 1992 (aged 28)	
30	(United States)	Marissa Sheva	DF	April 22, 1997 (aged 23)	
Midfielders
9	(United States)	Lo'eau LaBonta	MF	March 18, 1993 (aged 27)	
10	(Canada)	Diana Matheson	MF	April 6, 1984 (aged 36)	Federation
11	(Canada)	Desiree Scott	MF	July 31, 1987 (aged 32)	Federation
13	(United States)	Chestley Strother	MF	June 13, 1994 (aged 26)	
21	(Spain)	Verónica Boquete	MF	April 9, 1987 (aged 33)	International
29	(United States)	Kate Del Fava	MF	July 23, 1998 (aged 21)	
38	(France)	Aminata Diallo	MF	April 3, 1995 (aged 25)	International, Loan
66	(Iceland)	Gunnhildur Yrsa Jónsdóttir	MF	September 28, 1988 (aged 31)	
Forwards
3	(United States)	Tziarra King	FW	August 24, 1998 (aged 21)	
8	(United States)	Amy Rodriguez	FW	February 17, 1987 (aged 33)	
12	(United States)	Taylor Lytle	FW	March 31, 1989 (aged 31)	
17	(United States)	Arielle Ship	FW	May 2, 1995 (aged 25)	
25	(United States)	Brittany Ratcliffe	FW	February 7, 1994 (aged 26)	
33	(United States)	Holly Daugirda	FW	December 24, 1997 (aged 22)	
42	(United States)	Raisa Strom-Okimoto	FW	October 25, 1997 (aged 22)	

== Washington Spirit ==
The final 26-player roster was announced on June 23, 2020.

Head coach: (England) Richie Burke

No.	Nationality	Name	Position(s)	Date of birth (age)	Designation
Goalkeepers
1	(United States)	Aubrey Bledsoe	GK	November 20, 1991 (aged 28)	
21	(United States)	Katie Lund	GK	November 27, 1996 (aged 23)	
25	(Canada)	Devon Kerr	GK	July 3, 1997 (aged 22)	
Defenders
3	(United States)	Sam Staab	DF	March 28, 1997 (aged 23)	
4	(United States)	Natalie Jacobs	DF	August 16, 1997 (aged 22)	
5	(United States)	Brooke Hendrix	DF	May 6, 1993 (aged 27)	
9	(United States)	Tegan McGrady	DF	October 11, 1997 (aged 22)	
14	(United States)	Paige Nielsen	DF	October 24, 1993 (aged 26)	
22	(Canada)	Jenna Hellstrom	DF	April 2, 1995 (aged 25)	International
23	(United States)	Tori Huster	DF	September 23, 1989 (aged 30)	
24	(United States)	Kaiya McCullough	DF	May 29, 1998 (aged 22)	
Midfielders
7	(United States)	Jaye Boissiere	MF	February 16, 1996 (aged 24)	
8	(United States)	Meggie Dougherty Howard	MF	July 27, 1995 (aged 24)	
10	(United States)	Rose Lavelle	MF	May 14, 1995 (aged 25)	Federation
11	(United States)	Jordan DiBiasi	MF	October 28, 1996 (aged 23)	
12	(United States)	Andi Sullivan	MF	December 20, 1995 (aged 24)	
18	(United States)	Jessie Scarpa	MF	May 5, 1996 (aged 24)	
19	(United States)	Dorian Bailey	MF	January 28, 1997 (aged 23)	
26	(United States)	Meghan McCool	MF	September 14, 1997 (aged 22)	
Forwards
2	(United States)	Ashley Sanchez	FW	March 16, 1999 (aged 21)	
6	(United States)	Katie McClure	FW	March 14, 1998 (aged 22)	
13	(United States)	Bayley Feist	FW	March 14, 1997 (aged 23)	
16	(United States)	Averie Collins	FW	March 3, 1997 (aged 23)	
17	(Japan)	Kumi Yokoyama	FW	August 13, 1993 (aged 26)	International
31	(United States)	Crystal Thomas	FW	January 18, 1994 (aged 26)	
33	(United States)	Ashley Hatch	FW	May 25, 1995 (aged 25)	
