= 2020 Sky Blue FC season =

Sky Blue FC
2020 season
- Club Chair: Tammy Murphy
- Head coach: Freya Coombe
- Stadium: Red Bull Arena; Harrison, New Jersey (Capacity: 25,000)
- NWSL: Cancelled
- Challenge Cup: Semi-finals
- Fall Series: 4th
- Top goalscorer: Ifeoma Onumonu; Paige Monaghan (3)
Home colors	Away colors

The 2020 Sky Blue FC season was the team's 11th season as a professional women's soccer team, and their eighth season as a member of the National Women's Soccer League.

The season was originally scheduled to begin on March 18, 2020. However, due to the COVID-19 pandemic, the start date was delayed. Preseason matches were cancelled on March 12 and on April 4 it was announced that a moratorium on training would continue through May 5, 2020. On April 24, the NWSL announced the moratorium on training would be extended through May 15. The start date of the season was further shifted to an indeterminate point, with the league promising to "include an appropriate preseason training period" before launching the season. Small group training resumed on May 25, and on May 27 the NWSL announced that the 2020 NWSL Challenge Cup would mark the league's return to action following the COVID-19 pandemic. The tournament was hosted in Utah from June 27 to July 26.

On June 22, 2020, the NWSL confirmed that the regular season had been cancelled and the Challenge Cup would act as the 2020 season. Sky Blue finished the preliminary round as the seventh seed before ultimately being eliminated in the semi-finals by the Chicago Red Stars.

On August 25, the NWSL announced that the season would continue with a Fall Series beginning on September 5. Per the rules of the series, Sky Blue played four matches as part of a three-team regional pod with the Chicago Red Stars and Washington Spirit. Sky Blue ultimately placed fourth in the Fall Series.

== Team ==
=== First-team roster ===
As of November 16, 2020

Note: Flags indicate national team as defined under FIFA eligibility rules; some limited exceptions apply. Players may hold more than one non-FIFA nationality.

No.	Pos.	Nation	Player
1	GK	CAN	Kailen Sheridan
3	DF	USA	Caprice Dydasco
4	MF	USA	Paige Monaghan
5	MF	USA	Nicole Baxter
7	MF	USA	McCall Zerboni
8	DF	USA	Erica Skroski
10	MF	USA	Carli Lloyd
11	FW	USA	Mallory Pugh
12	DF	USA	Gina Lewandowski
13	GK	BIH	DiDi Haracic
14	MF	USA	Kenie Wright

No.	Pos.	Nation	Player
15	DF	MEX	Sabrina Flores
16	MF	USA	Sarah Woldmoe (captain)
17	DF	USA	Domi Richardson
21	GK	USA	Mandy McGlynn
22	DF	USA	Mandy Freeman
23	FW	USA	Margaret Purce
24	DF	CMR	Estelle Johnson
25	FW	USA	Ifeoma Onumonu
28	MF	USA	Imani Dorsey
35	GK	USA	Megan Hinz

=== Challenge Cup roster ===
On June 23, 2020, Sky Blue announced their twenty-six player roster for the 2020 NWSL Challenge Cup. In the same announcement, the club confirmed that three players contracted to the club (Carli Lloyd, Caprice Dydasco, and Mallory Pugh) had been left out through injury. On June 26, Madison Tiernan was also ruled out of the tournament with an injury.

Squad no.	Name (Note: denotes season-ending injury.)	Nationality	Position(s)	Date of birth
Goalkeepers
1	Kailen Sheridan	(Canada)	GK	July 16, 1995 (age 31)
13	DiDi Haracic	(Bosnia and Herzegovina)	GK	April 12, 1992 (age 34)
21	Mandy McGlynn	(United States)	GK	November 3, 1998 (age 28)
35	Megan Hinz	(United States)	GK	December 4, 1995 (age 30)
Defenders
2	Kaleigh Riehl	(United States)	DF	October 21, 1996 (age 30)
8	Erica Skroski	(United States)	DF	February 14, 1994 (age 32)
12	Gina Lewandowski	(United States)	DF / MF	April 13, 1985 (age 41)
15	Sabrina Flores	(Mexico)	DF / MF	January 31, 1996 (age 30)
22	Mandy Freeman	(United States)	DF	March 25, 1995 (age 31)
24	Estelle Johnson	(Cameroon)	DF	July 21, 1988 (age 38)
26	Chantelle Swaby	(Jamaica)	DF	August 6, 1998 (age 28)
Midfielders
5	Nicole Baxter	(United States)	MF	May 12, 1994 (age 32)
6	Jennifer Cudjoe	(Ghana)	MF	March 7, 1994 (age 32)
7	McCall Zerboni	(United States)	MF	December 13, 1986 (age 39)
9	Nahomi Kawasumi	(Japan)	MF / FW	September 23, 1985 (age 41)
14	Kenie Wright	(United States)	MF	August 22, 1997 (age 29)
16	Sarah Woldmoe (captain)	(United States)	MF	July 27, 1992 (age 34)
17	Domi Richardson	(United States)	MF	October 18, 1992 (age 34)
18	Cassidy Benintente	(United States)	MF / DF	June 12, 1994 (age 32)
19	Elizabeth Eddy	(United States)	MF	September 13, 1991 (age 35)
23	Margaret Purce	(United States)	MF / FW / DF	September 18, 1995 (age 31)
73	Madison Tiernan	(United States)	MF	July 3, 1995 (age 31)
Forwards
4	Paige Monaghan	(United States)	FW / MF	November 13, 1996 (age 29)
20	Evelyne Viens	(Canada)	FW	February 6, 1997 (age 29)
25	Ifeoma Onumonu	(United States)	FW	February 25, 1994 (age 32)
28	Imani Dorsey	(United States)	FW / MF / DF	March 21, 1996 (age 30)

=== Coaching staff ===
As of June 16, 2020

Position	Staff
Head coach	(England) Freya Coombe
Assistant coach	(United States) Rebecca Moros
Assistant coach	(England) Becki Tweed
Goalkeeper coach	(England) Dean O'Leary
High Performance Coach	(United States) Philip Congleton
Technical Advisor	(United States) Marcia McDermott
Head physio	(United States) Joelle Muro

== Competitions ==
=== Overview ===
Competition	First match	Last match	Starting round	Final position	Record							
Competition	First match	Last match	Starting round	Final position	Pld	W	D	L	GF	GA	GD	Win %
NWSL Fall Series	September 5, 2020	October 10, 2020	Matchday 1	Fourth place	4	2	0	2	6	7	−1	50.00
Challenge Cup	June 30, 2020	July 22, 2020	Preliminary round	Semi-finals	6	1	2	3	4	6	−2	16.67
Total					10	3	2	5	10	13	−3	30.00

Last updated: October 17, 2020
Source: Competitions

=== Preseason ===
Preseason training and matches were originally scheduled to take place beginning on March 28, but on March 12 all preseason matches were cancelled.

==== Matches ====
April 1, 2020	University of North Carolina	Cancelled	Sky Blue FC	North Carolina

April 4, 2020	University of Virginia	Cancelled	Sky Blue FC	North Carolina

April 5, 2020	North Carolina Courage	Cancelled	Sky Blue FC	Cary, North Carolina
				Stadium: WakeMed Soccer Park

=== National Women's Soccer League ===
==== Regular season ====
===== Matches =====
The regular season schedule was announced on February 25, 2020. However, following the onset of the COVID-19 pandemic, the regular season was eventually cancelled and replaced by the 2020 NWSL Challenge Cup.

April 19, 2020 1	Orlando Pride	Cancelled	Sky Blue FC	Orlando, Florida
				Stadium: Exploria Stadium

April 16, 2020 2	Sky Blue FC	Cancelled	OL Reign	Harrison, New Jersey
				Stadium: Red Bull Arena

May 3, 2020 3	Houston Dash	Cancelled	Sky Blue FC	Houston, Texas
				Stadium: BBVA Stadium

May 9, 2020 4	Sky Blue FC	Cancelled	Washington Spirit	Harrison, New Jersey
16:00 ET				Stadium: Red Bull Arena

May 13, 2020 5	Sky Blue FC	Cancelled	North Carolina Courage	Harrison, New Jersey
19:30 ET				Stadium: Red Bull Arena

May 24, 2020 6	Sky Blue FC	Cancelled	Houston Dash	Harrison, New Jersey
15:00 ET				Stadium: Red Bull Arena

May 30, 2020 7	Portland Thorns FC	Cancelled	Sky Blue FC	Portland, Oregon
22:30 ET				Stadium: Providence Park

June 13, 2020 8	Sky Blue FC	Cancelled	Chicago Red Stars	Harrison, New Jersey
				Stadium: Red Bull Arena

June 20, 2020 9	Sky Blue FC	Cancelled	Utah Royals FC	Harrison, New Jersey
				Stadium: Red Bull Arena

June 27, 2020 10	OL Reign	Cancelled	Sky Blue FC	Tacoma, Washington
				Stadium: Cheney Stadium

July 3, 2020 11	Washington Spirit	Cancelled	Sky Blue FC	Leesburg, Virginia
				Stadium: Segra Field

July 11, 2020 12	Portland Thorns FC	Cancelled	Sky Blue FC	Portland, Oregon
				Stadium: Providence Park

July 18, 2020 13	Sky Blue FC	Cancelled	North Carolina Courage	Harrison, New Jersey
				Stadium: Red Bull Arena

August 7, 2020 14	Orlando Pride	Cancelled	Sky Blue FC	Orlando, Florida
				Stadium: Exploria Stadium

August 16, 2020 15	Sky Blue FC	Cancelled	Houston Dash	Harrison, New Jersey
				Stadium: Red Bull Arena

August 23, 2020 16	Chicago Red Stars	Cancelled	Sky Blue FC	Bridgeview, Illinois
				Stadium: SeatGeek Stadium

August 30, 2020 17	Washington Spirit	Cancelled	Sky Blue FC	Washington, D.C.
				Stadium: Audi Field

September 5, 2020 18	Utah Royals FC	Cancelled	Sky Blue FC	Sandy, Utah
				Stadium: Rio Tinto Stadium

September 13, 2020 19	Sky Blue FC	Cancelled	OL Reign	Harrison, New Jersey
				Stadium: Red Bull Arena

September 26, 2020 20	Sky Blue FC	Cancelled	Portland Thorns FC	Harrison, New Jersey
				Stadium: Red Bull Arena

September 30, 2020 21	North Carolina Courage	Cancelled	Sky Blue FC	Cary, North Carolina
				Stadium: WakeMed Soccer Park

October 3, 2020 22	Sky Blue FC	Cancelled	Orlando Pride	Harrison, New Jersey
				Stadium: Red Bull Arena

October 11, 2020 23	Sky Blue FC	Cancelled	Utah Royals FC	Harrison, New Jersey
				Stadium: Red Bull Arena

October 17, 2020 24	Chicago Red Stars	Cancelled	Sky Blue FC	Bridgeview, Illinois
				Stadium: SeatGeek Stadium

==== Fall Series ====
On September 1, the NWSL announced a partial schedule for the NWSL Fall Series. The full schedule was subsequently announced on September 3.

===== Standings =====
Pos	Team	Pld	W	D	L	GF	GA	GD	Pts	Qualification
1	Portland Thorns FC (C)	4	3	1	0	10	3	+7	10	Community Shield
2	Houston Dash	4	3	0	1	12	7	+5	9	Runners-up
3	Washington Spirit	4	2	1	1	5	4	+1	7	Third place
4	Sky Blue FC	4	2	0	2	6	7	−1	6	
5	North Carolina Courage	4	1	2	1	8	10	−2	5	
6	Chicago Red Stars	4	1	1	2	7	7	0	4	
7	OL Reign	4	1	1	2	6	8	−2	4	
8	Orlando Pride	4	0	2	2	5	8	−3	2	
9	Utah Royals FC	4	0	2	2	3	8	−5	2	

Source: NWSL
Rules for classification: Tiebreakers
(C) Champions

===== Results by matchday =====
Round	1	2	3	4
Stadium	A	A	H	H
Result	W	L	L	W
Position	1	5	6	4

Updated to match(es) played on October 10, 2020. Source: NWSLsoccer.com
A = Away; H = Home; W = Win; D = Draw; L = Loss

===== Matches =====
September 5, 2020 1	Washington Spirit	1–2	Sky Blue FC	Leesburg, Virginia
13:00 EST	Hendrix (yellow card) 41'; Nielsen 89'	Report	Onumonu 18'; Purce 90+2'	Stadium: Segra Field; Attendance: 0 Referee: Danielle Chesky

September 20, 2020 2	Chicago Red Stars	4–1	Sky Blue FC	Bridgeview, Illinois
13:00 EST	Watt 10', 57'; Goralski 28'; DiBernardo 44'; Davison (yellow card) 90+1'	Report	Onumonu 6'; Monaghan (yellow card) 47'; Cudjoe (yellow card) 67'	Stadium: SeatGeek Stadium; Referee: Rebecca Pagan

October 3, 2020 3	Sky Blue FC	0–1	Washington Spirit	Montclair, New Jersey
12:30 EST	Richardson (yellow card) 56'; Cudjoe (yellow card) 82'	Report	Yokoyama 50'; Hellstrom (yellow card) 54'; Howard (yellow card) 90+1'	Stadium: MSU Soccer Park at Pittser Field

October 10, 2020 4	Sky Blue FC	3–1	Chicago Red Stars	Montclair, New Jersey
12:30 EST	Monaghan 25', 45+2'; Onumomu 35'; Skroski (yellow card) 51'	Report	Davidson (yellow card) 11'; Gautrat 89'	Stadium: MSU Soccer Park at Pittser Field

=== Challenge Cup ===
==== Preliminary round ====
===== Standings =====
Pos	Team	Pld	W	D	L	GF	GA	GD	Pts
1	North Carolina Courage	4	4	0	0	7	1	+6	12
2	Washington Spirit	4	2	1	1	4	4	0	7
3	OL Reign	4	1	2	1	1	2	−1	5
4	Houston Dash	4	1	1	2	5	6	−1	4
5	Utah Royals FC (H)	4	1	1	2	4	5	−1	4
6	Chicago Red Stars	4	1	1	2	2	3	−1	4 (Note: Chicago Red Stars won the tiebreaker against Sky Blue FC on fewer yellow cards (1 to 4).)
7	Sky Blue FC	4	1	1	2	2	3	−1	4
8	Portland Thorns FC	4	0	3	1	2	3	−1	3

Source: NWSL
Rules for classification: Tiebreakers
(H) Host

===== Results by matchday =====
Round	1	2	3	4
Stadium	N	N	N	N
Result	D	L	W	L
Position	5	8	2	7

Updated to match(es) played on July 22, 2020. Source: NWSLsoccer.com
A = Away; H = Home; N = Neutral venue; W = Win; D = Draw; L = Loss; P = Postponed

===== Matches =====
Sky Blue were originally slated to play the Orlando Pride as part of the preliminary round of the competition. However, on June 22 it was reported that several of Orlando's players and staff had tested positive for COVID-19 and that Orlando would be withdrawing from the competition. A revised schedule was subsequently announced on June 23.

June 30, 2020 1	OL Reign	0–0	Sky Blue FC	Herriman, Utah
22:00 EDT	Cook (yellow card) 59'	Report		Stadium: Zions Bank Stadium; Attendance: 0 Referee: Michael Radchuk

July 4, 2020 2	Utah Royals FC	1–0	Sky Blue FC	Herriman, Utah
12:30 EDT	Rodriguez 41'; Del Fava (yellow card) 46'; Ship (yellow card) 90+4'	Report	Purce (yellow card) 8'; Cudjoe (yellow card) 67'	Stadium: Zions Bank Stadium; Attendance: 0 Referee: Katja Koroleva

July 8, 2020 3	Sky Blue FC	2–0	Houston Dash	Herriman, Utah
22:00 EDT	Monaghan 17'; Kawasumi 34'; Zerboni (yellow card) 37'; Woldmoe (yellow card) 64'	Report		Stadium: Zions Bank Stadium; Attendance: 0 Referee: Tori Penso

July 13, 2020 4	Sky Blue FC	0–2	North Carolina Courage	Herriman, Utah
22:00 EDT		Report	Mewis 7'; Dunn 56'	Stadium: Zions Bank Stadium; Attendance: 0 Referee: Lukasz Szpala

==== Knockout round ====
===== Quarter-finals =====
July 18, 2020	Washington Spirit	0–0 (3–4 p)	Sky Blue FC	Herriman, Utah
12:30 EDT		Report	Johnson (yellow card) 18'; Evelyne Viens (yellow card) 90+2'	Stadium: Zions Bank Stadium; Attendance: 0 Referee: Karen Abt
	Penalties
	Lavelle (penalty scored); Hatch (penalty scored); Staab (penalty missed); Thomas (penalty scored); Feist (penalty missed)		(penalty scored) Woldmoe; (penalty scored) Kawasumi; (penalty missed) Richardson; (penalty scored) Zerboni; (penalty scored) Eddy

===== Semi-finals =====
July 22, 2020	Sky Blue FC	2–3	Chicago Red Stars	Sandy, Utah
22:00 EDT	Viens 72'; Onumonu (yellow card) 74'; Ertz 77' (o.g.)	Report	St. Georges 8'; Hill 11'; McCaskill 60'	Stadium: Rio Tinto Stadium; Attendance: 0 Referee: Lukasz Szpala

== Squad statistics ==
=== Appearances ===
As of match played October 10, 2020

No.	Pos.	Nat.	Player	Challenge Cup		Fall Series		Total	
No.	Pos.	Nat.	Player	Apps	Starts	Apps	Starts	Apps	Starts
1	GK	(Canada)	Kailen Sheridan	6	6	4	3	10	9
2	DF	(United States)	Kaleigh Riehl	1	1	0	0	1	1
4	FW	(United States)	Paige Monaghan	6	6	4	4	10	10
5	MF	(United States)	Nicole Baxter	1	0	4	1	5	1
6	MF	(Ghana)	Jennifer Cudjoe	6	4	3	3	9	7
7	MF	(United States)	McCall Zerboni	5	5	0	0	5	5
8	DF	(United States)	Erica Skroski	5	0	4	1	9	1
9	MF	(Japan)	Nahomi Kawasumi	6	6	0	0	6	6
11	FW	(United States)	Mallory Pugh	0	0	1	0	1	0
12	DF	(United States)	Gina Lewandowski	6	6	2	2	8	8
13	GK	(Bosnia and Herzegovina)	DiDi Haracic	0	0	1	1	1	1
15	DF	(Mexico)	Sabrina Flores	6	4	4	3	10	7
16	MF	(United States)	Sarah Woldmoe	6	6	4	4	10	10
17	MF	(United States)	Domi Richardson	5	2	4	4	9	6
18	FW	(England)	Mikaela Howell	0	0	1	0	1	0
19	MF	(United States)	Elizabeth Eddy	5	1	0	0	5	1
20	FW	(Canada)	Evelyne Viens	6	1	0	0	6	1
22	DF	(United States)	Mandy Freeman	0	0	4	4	4	4
23	MF	(United States)	Margaret Purce	5	5	4	4	9	9
24	DF	(Cameroon)	Estelle Johnson	6	5	3	2	9	8
25	FW	(United States)	Ifeoma Onumonu	6	5	4	4	10	9
28	FW	(United States)	Imani Dorsey	4	3	4	4	8	7
Total				6		4		10	

=== Goals and assists ===
As of match played October 10, 2020

No.	Nat.	Pos.	Player	Challenge Cup		Fall Series		Total	
No.	Nat.	Pos.	Player	Goals	Assists	Goals	Assists	Goals	Assists
25	(United States)	FW	Ifeoma Onumonu	0	1	3	0	3	1
4	(United States)	FW	Paige Monaghan	1	0	2	1	3	1
23	(United States)	MF	Margaret Purce	0	0	1	2	1	2
9	(Japan)	MF	Nahomi Kawasumi	1	0	0	0	1	0
20	(Canada)	FW	Evelyne Viens	1	0	0	0	1	0
7	(United States)	MF	McCall Zerboni	0	1	0	0	0	1
11	(United States)	FW	Mallory Pugh	0	0	0	1	0	1
Own goals				1	–	0	–	1	–
Total				4	2	6	4	10	6

=== Shutouts ===
As of match played October 10, 2020

No.	Nat.	Player	Challenge Cup	Fall Series	Total						
No.	Nat.	Player	Challenge Cup	Fall Series	Total	1	(Canada)	Kailen Sheridan	3	0	3
13	(Bosnia and Herzegovina)	DiDi Haracic	0	0	0						
Total			3	0	3						

=== Disciplinary record ===
As of match played October 10, 2020

No.	Pos.	Nat.	Player	Challenge Cup		Fall Series		Total	
No.	Pos.	Nat.	Player	Yellow card	Red card	Yellow card	Red card	Yellow card	Red card
23	MF	(United States)	Margaret Purce	1	0	0	0	1	0
6	MF	(Ghana)	Jennifer Cudjoe	1	0	2	0	3	0
7	MF	(United States)	McCall Zerboni	1	0	0	0	1	0
16	MF	(United States)	Sarah Woldmoe	1	0	0	0	1	0
24	DF	(Cameroon)	Estelle Johnson	1	0	0	0	1	0
20	FW	(Canada)	Evelyne Viens	1	0	0	0	1	0
25	FW	(United States)	Ifeoma Onumonu	1	0	0	0	1	0
4	FW	(United States)	Paige Monaghan	0	0	1	0	1	0
17	MF	(United States)	Domi Richardson	0	0	1	0	1	0
8	DF	(United States)	Erica Skroski	0	0	1	0	1	0
Total				7	0	5	0	12	0

== Transfers ==
=== 2020 NWSL College Draft ===
Round	Pick	Nat.	Player	Pos.	College
1	5	(Canada)	Evelyne Viens	FW	South Florida
2	11	(United States)	Kaleigh Riehl	DF	Penn State
3	20	(United States)	Amanda McGlynn	GK	Virginia Tech
4	29	(Jamaica)	Chantelle Swaby	MF	Rutgers

=== Transfers in ===
Date	Nat.	Player	Pos.	Previous club	Fee/notes	Ref.
January 16, 2020	(United States)	Mallory Pugh	FW	Washington Spirit	Trade for draft slots.	
January 17, 2020	(United States)	Ifeoma Onumonu	FW	OL Reign	Trade for rights to Julia Ashley.	
February 11, 2020	(Canada)	Evelyne Viens	FW	USF	Draft pick. Two-year deal.	
February 11, 2020	(United States)	Kaleigh Riehl	DF	Penn State	Draft pick. One-year deal.	
March 2, 2020	(United States)	McCall Zerboni	MF	North Carolina Courage	Trade for rights to Hailie Mace.	
March 7, 2020	(United States)	Margaret Purce	FW / MF	Portland Thorns FC	Trade for Raquel Rodriguez.	
June 12, 2020	(United States)	Mandy McGlynn	GK	Virginia Tech	Draft pick. One-year deal.	
June 18, 2020	(Ghana)	Jennifer Cudjoe	MF	Asheville City SC	Short-term contract.	
June 18, 2020	(United States)	Nicole Baxter	MF	(Sweden) Asarums IF FK	Short-term contract.	
June 18, 2020	(United States)	Cassidy Benintente	MF / DF	(Sweden) Asarums IF FK	Short-term contract.	
June 21, 2020	(Mexico)	Sabrina Flores	DF / MF	(Spain) Sevilla	Signed two-year deal.	
June 22, 2020	(Jamaica)	Chantelle Swaby	DF	Rutgers	Draft pick. Short-term contract.	
October 2, 2020	(England)	Mikaela Howell	FW		Short-term contract.	

=== Transfers out ===
Date	Nat.	Player	Pos.	Destination club	Fee/notes	Ref.
January 8, 2020	(Costa Rica)	Raquel Rodriguez	FW	Portland Thorns FC	Trade for Margaret Purce.	
January 18, 2020	(Canada)	Amandine Pierre-Louis	DF	(France) FC Metz	Waived.	
February 7, 2020	(United States)	Jen Hoy	FW		Retired.	
September 1, 2020	(United States)	Madison Tiernan	MF		Retired.	
September 4, 2020	(United States)	Cassidy Benintente	MF		Retired.	
September 4, 2020	(Jamaica)	Chantelle Swaby	DF		End of contract.	
November 12, 2020	(Ghana)	Jennifer Cudjoe	MF	Racing Louisville FC	2020 NWSL Expansion Draft	
November 12, 2020	(United States)	Kaleigh Riehl	DF	Racing Louisville FC	2020 NWSL Expansion Draft	

=== Loans out ===
Start date	End date	Pos.	No.	Nat.	Player	Destination club	Ref.
August 1, 2020	November 30, 2020	MF	19	(United States)	Elizabeth Eddy	(Sweden) Vittsjö GIK	
August 15, 2020	December 31, 2020	MF	9	(Japan)	Nahomi Kawasumi	(Japan) INAC Kobe Leonessa	
August 28, 2020	February 28, 2021	FW	20	(Canada)	Evelyne Viens	(France) Paris FC	
September 18, 2020	February 28, 2021	DF	2	(United States)	Kaleigh Riehl	(France) Paris FC	

=== New contracts ===
Date	Nat.	Player	Pos.	Ref.
January 13, 2020	(United States)	Sarah Woldmoe	MF	
January 22, 2020	(Cameroon)	Estelle Johnson	DF	
January 27, 2020	(Japan)	Nahomi Kawasumi	MF	
January 29, 2020	(United States)	Gina Lewandowski	DF	
February 3, 2020	(United States)	Paige Monaghan	MF	
February 6, 2020	(United States)	Erica Skroski	DF	
February 13, 2020	(United States)	Imani Dorsey	MF	
February 20, 2020	(United States)	Elizabeth Eddy	MF	
February 26, 2020	(United States)	Domi Richardson	DF	
August 28, 2020	(Ghana)	Jennifer Cudjoe	MF	
September 4, 2020	(United States)	Nicole Baxter	MF	

== Awards ==
=== Team ===
- Most Valuable Player: Kailen Sheridan
- Player's Player: Kailen Sheridan
- Unsung Hero: Sarah Woldmoe
- Defender of the Year: Gina Lewandowski
- Newcomer of the Year: Margaret Purce

==== Challenge Cup ====
- SBFC Most Valuable Player: Kailen Sheridan

=== NWSL Challenge Cup ===
- Golden Glove: Kailen Sheridan

=== 2020 NCAA Woman of the Year Award ===
==== Nominated ====
- Evelyne Viens
- Kaleigh Riehl
