= 2019 Sky Blue FC season =

Sky Blue FC
2019 season
- President & CEO: Thomas Hofstetter
- Head coach: Denise Reddy (until June 28); Hugo Macedo (caretaker, from June 28 until September 4); Freya Coombe (from September 4)
- Stadium: Yurcak Field; Piscataway, New Jersey (Capacity: 5,000)
- NWSL: 8th
- Top goalscorer: Carli Lloyd (8)
- Highest home attendance: 9,415 vs Reign FC, August 18, 2019
- Lowest home attendance: 1,321 vs Portland Thorns FC, April 28, 2019
- Average home league attendance: 3,338
Home colors	Away colors

The 2019 Sky Blue FC season was the team's tenth season as a professional women's soccer team. Sky Blue FC plays in the National Women's Soccer League, the top tier of women's soccer in the United States.

Since the 2018 Sky Blue finished in last place and only won one game, 2019 offered opportunities for improvement. The off-season didn't get off to a promising start as two of the team's top draft picks, Hailie Mace (2nd overall pick) and Julia Ashley (6th overall pick) chose not to sign with the club. Mace signed with FC Rosengård and Ashley with Linköpings FC. Sky Blue's third and fourth picks, Paige Monaghan (10th overall pick) and Julie James (11th overall pick) did however choose to come to preseason and were ultimately signed. During preseason training two Sky Blue players suffered season-ending injuries. Defender Mandy Freeman ruptured her Achilles tendon and midfielder Madison Tiernan tore her ACL and MCL.

On April 9, 2019 General Manager and President Tony Novo resigned from his position, Sky Blue Vice-President Alyse LaHue was appointed to take over as interim general manager. Kyra Carusa, Sky Blue's 19th overall pick in the 2019 Draft signed with Le Havre AC in France on April 25, making her the third Sky Blue draft pick to sign in Europe.

On June 28, Denise Reddy was fired as the team's head coach. Her record as head coach was 1-8-24. Goalkeeper coach Hugo Macedo filled in on a temporary basis until the club named Freya Coombe interim head coach on September 4.

Sky Blue played their first ever game at Red Bull Arena on August 18 against Reign FC. They set a club record with 9,415 in attendance for the game, which finished in a 1–1 draw. The positive feedback and high demand led the club to move their September 29 home finale to Red Bull Arena, where they drew 8,314 for a 1–1 draw against the Orlando Pride.

== Team ==
=== First-team roster ===
As of July 19, 2019 Note: Flags indicate national team as defined under FIFA eligibility rules; some limited exceptions apply. Players may hold more than one non-FIFA nationality.

No.	Pos.	Nation	Player
1	GK	CAN	Kailen Sheridan
3	DF	USA	Caprice Dydasco
4	MF	USA	Paige Monaghan
5	MF	USA	Julie James
7	FW	USA	Jen Hoy
8	DF	USA	Erica Skroski
9	FW	JPN	Nahomi Kawasumi
10	MF	USA	Carli Lloyd
11	MF	CRC	Raquel Rodriguez
12	DF	USA	Gina Lewandowski
13	GK	BIH	DiDi Haracic

No.	Pos.	Nation	Player
14	MF	USA	Kenie Wright
16	MF	USA	Sarah Killion
17	DF	USA	Domi Richardson
19	MF	USA	Elizabeth Eddy
22	DF	USA	Mandy Freeman
24	DF	CMR	Estelle Johnson
28	MF	USA	Imani Dorsey
29	DF	CAN	Amandine Pierre-Louis
73	MF	USA	Madison Tiernan
—	MF	USA	Nicole Baxter

== Competitions ==
=== Preseason ===
March 16, 2019	Sky Blue FC	6–0	St. John's University	Manalapan, New Jersey
3:00 p.m.		Report	Monaghan 12', 45'; Dorsey 23'; Hoy 33'; Lloyd 41', 65'	Stadium: Sportika Sports

March 23, 2019	Sky Blue FC	0–0	West Virginia University	Manalapan, New Jersey
3:00 p.m.				Stadium: Sportika Sports

March 29, 2019	Sky Blue FC	2–0	Rutgers University	Manalapan, New Jersey
7:00 p.m.	Hoy 9'; Monaghan 77'	Report		Stadium: Sportika Sports

=== Regular season ===
April 13, 2019 1	Washington Spirit	2–0	Sky Blue FC	Boyds, Maryland
19:00	Staab 59'; Crosson 90+2'	Report		Stadium: Maryland SoccerPlex; Attendance: 2.373

April 20, 2019 2	Sky Blue FC	0–1	Houston Dash	Piscataway, New Jersey
18:00	Lloyd (yellow card) 80'	Report	Agnew (yellow card) 49'; Huerta 83'	Stadium: Yurcak Field; Attendance: 1,394

April 28, 2019 3	Sky Blue FC	2–2	Portland Thorns FC	Piscataway, New Jersey
18:00	Lloyd 6', 18'; James (yellow card) 60'	Report	Sonnett 32'; Heath 34'	Stadium: Yurcak Field; Attendance: 1,321

May 4, 2019 4	North Carolina Courage	0–0	Sky Blue FC	Cary, North Carolina
19:00	McCall Zerboni (yellow card) 87'	Report	Paige Monaghan (yellow card) 34'	Stadium: WakeMed Soccer Park; Attendance: 5,039

May 11, 2019 5	Sky Blue FC	2–3	Washington Spirit	Piscataway, New Jersey
15:00	Rodriguez 32'; Dorsey 80'	Report	Matthews 22', 68'; Dougherty Howard (yellow card) 27'; DiBiasi 55'; Nielsen (yellow card) 54'	Stadium: Yurcak Field; Attendance: 1,330

May 18, 2019 6	Reign FC	2–1	Sky Blue FC	Tacoma, Washington
16:00	James 13' (o.g.); Taylor 78'; Onumonu (yellow card) 90+8'	Box	Rodriguez 10'; McCaskill (yellow card) 45+1'	Stadium: Cheney Stadium; Attendance: 3,036

May 25, 2019 7	Sky Blue FC	0–1	Portland Thorns FC	Piscataway, New Jersey
18:00		Box	Purce 69'; Brynjarsdottir (yellow card) 87'	Stadium: Yurcak Field; Attendance: 1,472

June 15, 2019 8	Utah Royals FC	1–0	Sky Blue FC	Sandy, Utah
22:00	Rodriguez 16'; Tymrak (yellow card) 90+2'	Box	Skroski (yellow card) 84'	Stadium: Rio Tinto Stadium; Attendance: 5,777

June 22, 2019 9	Sky Blue FC	1–2	Orlando Pride	Piscataway, New Jersey
19:00	Killion 67' (pen.); Dydasco (yellow card) 90+3'	Box	Ubogagu 32' (pen.); Lewandowski 67' (o.g.)	Stadium: Yurcak Field; Attendance: 1,644

July 6, 2019 10	Chicago Red Stars	1–2	Sky Blue FC	Bridgeview, Illinois
20:00	Colaprico 83'	Report	Rodriguez 23'; Hoy 81'; James (yellow card) 90+4'	Stadium: SeatGeek Stadium; Attendance: 2,374

July 12, 2019 11	Sky Blue FC	1–0	Utah Royals FC	Piscataway, New Jersey
19:30	James (yellow card) 42'; Flores (yellow card) 77'; Pierre-Louis (yellow card) 88'; Hoy 90+2'	Report		Stadium: Yurcak Field; Attendance: 1,842

July 20, 2019 12	Orlando Pride	1–0	Sky Blue FC	Orlando, Florida
19:30	Viggiano 23'; Zadorsky (yellow card) 52'; Ubogagu (yellow card) 78'	Report		Stadium: Exploria Stadium; Attendance: 9,415; Referee: Danielle Chesky

July 24, 2019 13	Sky Blue FC	0–1	Washington Spirit	Piscataway, New Jersey
19:30	James (yellow card) 50'	Report	Hatch 54'; Huster (yellow card) 90+2'	Stadium: Yurcak Field; Attendance: 5,003

July 28, 2019 14	Houston Dash	1–0	Sky Blue FC	Houston, Texas
19:00	Daly 22'	Report	Dorsey (yellow card) 68'	Stadium: BBVA Compass Stadium; Attendance: 3,510

August 4, 2019 15	Portland Thorns FC	1–1	Sky Blue FC	Portland, Oregon
23:00	Sinclair 39' (pen.)	Report	Dorsey 69'; Pierre-Louis (yellow card) 73' (yellow-red card) 90+2'	Stadium: Providence Park; Attendance: 19,070

August 7, 2019 16	Utah Royals FC	3–0	Sky Blue FC	Sandy, Utah
22:00	Press 27', 29'; Rodriguez 48'	Report	Hoy (yellow card) 60'; Wright (yellow card) 60'	Stadium: Rio Tinto Stadium; Attendance: 7,715

August 14, 2019 17	Sky Blue FC	2–1	Chicago Red Stars	Piscataway, New Jersey
19:00	Monaghan 71' (Lloyd), 90+3' (Lloyd); Wright (yellow card) 56'	Report	Kerr 90+1' (Nagasato); Nagasato (yellow card) 62'; Naughton (yellow card) 64'	Stadium: Yurcak Field; Attendance: 2,558; Referee: Thomas Snyder

August 18, 2019 18	Sky Blue FC	1–1	Reign FC	Harrison, New Jersey
13:00	Eddy 36'	Report	Taylor 38'; Long (yellow card) 84'	Stadium: Red Bull Arena; Attendance: 9,415

August 24, 2019 19	Houston Dash	1–2	Sky Blue FC	Houston, Texas
20:30	Ohai 90+4'	Report	Dydasco (yellow card) 9'; Lloyd 26', 41'; Skroski (yellow card) 34'; Lewandowski (yellow card) 49'; Sheridan (yellow card) 83'	Stadium: BBVA Stadium; Attendance: 4,102

September 7, 2019 20	Sky Blue FC	1–2	North Carolina Courage	Piscataway, New Jersey
15:00	Lloyd 13' (pen.); Rodriguez (yellow card) 79'	Report	Skroski 1' (o.g.); Dunn 57'	Stadium: Yurcak Field; Attendance: 2,895

September 15, 2019 21	Sky Blue FC	0–3	Chicago Red Stars	Piscataway, New Jersey
17:00	Rodriguez (yellow card) 78'	Report	Brian 31'; Kerr 33'; Nagasato 80'	Stadium: Yurcak Field; Attendance: 2,871

September 21, 2019 22	Reign FC	0–1	Sky Blue FC	Tacoma, Washington
22:00		Box; Report	Dorsey (yellow card) 43'; Lloyd (yellow card) 50' (goal) 77'	Stadium: Cheney Stadium; Attendance: 6,189

September 29, 2019 23	Sky Blue FC	1–1	Orlando Pride	Harrison, New Jersey
11:00	Dorsey (yellow card) 45+2'; Monaghan (yellow card) 56'; Lloyd 88'	Report	Zadorsky 18'; Edmonds (yellow card) 42'	Stadium: Red Bull Arena; Attendance: 8,314

October 12, 2019 24	North Carolina Courage	3–2	Sky Blue FC	Cary, North Carolina
19:00	McDonald 16'; Debinha 28'; McDonald 81'	Report	Lloyd 26'; Richardson 86'	Stadium: WakeMed Soccer Park; Attendance: 9,195

==== Regular-season standings ====
Pos	Team	Pld	W	D	L	GF	GA	GD	Pts	Qualification
1	North Carolina Courage (C)	24	15	4	5	54	23	+31	49	NWSL Shield
2	Chicago Red Stars	24	14	2	8	41	28	+13	44	NWSL Playoffs
3	Portland Thorns FC	24	11	7	6	40	31	+9	40	NWSL Playoffs
4	Reign FC	24	10	8	6	27	27	0	38	NWSL Playoffs
5	Washington Spirit	24	9	7	8	30	25	+5	34	
6	Utah Royals FC	24	10	4	10	25	25	0	34	
7	Houston Dash	24	7	5	12	21	36	−15	26	
8	Sky Blue FC	24	5	5	14	20	34	−14	20	
9	Orlando Pride	24	4	4	16	24	53	−29	16	

Source: NWSL
Rules for classification: Tiebreakers
(C) Champions

===== Results summary =====
Overall								Home						Away					
Pld	W	D	L	GF	GA	GD	Pts	W	D	L	GF	GA	GD	W	D	L	GF	GA	GD
22	5	4	13	17	30	−13	19	2	2	7	10	17	−7	3	2	6	7	13	−6

Last updated: September 22, 2019.
Source: NWSLsoccer.com

===== Results by round =====
Round	1	2	3	4	5	6	7	8	9	10	11	12	13	14	15	16	17	18	19	20	21	22	23	24
Stadium	A	H	H	A	H	A	H	A	H	A	H	A	H	A	A	A	H	H	A	H	H	A	H	A
Result	L	L	D	D	L	L	L	L	L	W	W	L	L	L	D	L	W	D	W	L	L	W	D	L
Position	8	9	8	8	8	8	8	8	9	9	9	9	9	9	9	9	8	8	8	8	8	8	8	8

Updated to match(es) played on September 22, 2019. Source: NWSLsoccer.com
A = Away; H = Home; W = Win; D = Draw; L = Loss

== Statistical leaders ==
=== Top scorers ===
Rank	Player	Goals
1	(United States) Carli Lloyd	8
2	(Costa Rica) Raquel Rodriguez	3
3	(United States) Jen Hoy	2
3	(United States) Imani Dorsey	2
3	(United States) Paige Monaghan	2
6	(United States) Sarah Killion	1
6	(United States) McKenzie Meehan	1
6	(United States) Domi Richardson	1
6	(United States) Elizabeth Eddy	1

=== Top assists ===
Rank	Player	Assists
1	(United States) Sarah Killion	3
1	(Costa Rica) Raquel Rodriguez	3
3	(United States) Carli Lloyd	1
3	(United States) Paige Monaghan	1
3	(United States) Jen Hoy	1
3	(United States) Elizabeth Eddy	1
3	(United States) Julie James	1
3	(Japan) Nahomi Kawasumi	1
3	(Canada) Amandine Pierre-Louis	1
3	(United States) Kenie Wright	1
3	(United States) Savannah McCaskill	1

=== Shutouts ===
Rank	Player	Clean sheets
1	(Canada) Kailen Sheridan	3

== Player transactions ==
=== 2019 NWSL College Draft ===
Source: National Women's Soccer League

Round	Pick	Nat.	Player	Pos.	Previous Team
Round 1	2	(United States)	Hailie Mace	F	UCLA
Round 1	6	(United States)	Julia Ashley	D	University of North Carolina
Round 2	10	(United States)	Paige Monaghan	F	Butler University
Round 2	11	(United States)	Julie James	M	Baylor University
Round 3	19	(United States)	Kyra Carusa	F	Georgetown University
Round 4	28	(United States)	Kaylan Marckese	G	University of Florida
Round 4	29	(United States)	Kenie Wright	M	Rutgers University
Round 4	34	(United States)	Sabrina Flores	D	University of Notre Dame

=== In ===
Date	Player	Positions played	Previous club	Fee/notes	Ref.
January 10, 2019	(United States) Caprice Dydasco	DF	Washington Spirit	Acquired in Trade with the Washington Spirit for the 3rd Overall Pick in the 2019 NWSL College Draft	
January 10, 2019	(Bosnia and Herzegovina) DiDi Haracic	GK	Washington Spirit	Acquired in Trade with the Washington Spirit for the 3rd Overall Pick in the 2019 NWSL College Draft	
January 10, 2019	(Cameroon) Estelle Johnson	DF	Washington Spirit	Acquired in Trade with the Washington Spirit for the 3rd Overall Pick in the 2019 NWSL College Draft	
January 14, 2019	(Japan) Nahomi Kawasumi	FW	Reign FC	Acquired in Trade with Reign FC in exchange for Shea Groom	
April 10, 2019	(Brazil) Gabi	MF	(Brazil) Esporte Clube Iranduba da Amazônia	Signed.	
May 7, 2019	(United States) Gina Lewandowski	DF	(Germany) Bayern Munich	Signed.	
June 11, 2019	(United States) Elizabeth Eddy	MF	North Carolina Courage	Acquired in a trade with the North Carolina Courage in exchange for McKenzie Meehan	
July 19, 2019	(United States) Nicole Baxter	MF	(Sweden) Asarums IF	Signed.	

=== Out ===
Date	Player	Positions played	Destination club	Fee/notes	Ref.
November 14, 2018	(United States) Amanda Frisbie	DF	(Norway) Klepp IL	Signed with Klepp IL in Norway.	
November 20, 2018	(New Zealand) Rebekah Stott	DF	(Norway) Avaldsnes IL	Signed with Avaldsnes IL in Norway.	
January 9, 2019	(Mexico) Katie Johnson	FW	Chicago Red Stars	Traded to the Chicago Red Stars in exchange for the 6th overall pick in the 2019 NWSL College Draft and the highest second-round pick in 2020.	
January 12, 2019	(United States) Christina Gibbons	DF		Retired	
January 14, 2019	(United States) Shea Groom	FW	Reign FC	Traded to Reign FC in exchange for Nahomi Kawasumi	
March 8, 2019	(United States) Caroline Casey	GK		Retired	
June 11, 2019	(United States) McKenzie Meehan	FW	North Carolina Courage	Traded to the North Carolina Courage in exchange for Elizabeth Eddy.	
June 19, 2019	(United States) Savannah McCaskill	FW	Chicago Red Stars	Traded to the Chicago Red Stars in exchange for a First and Second Round draft pick in the 2020 NWSL College Draft	
July 14, 2019	(Brazil) Gabi	MF		Released	
July 19, 2019	(Mexico) Sabrina Flores	MF	(Spain) Sevilla	Released	

== Awards ==
=== NWSL Team of the Month ===
Month	Goalkeeper	Defenders	Midfielders	Forwards	Ref
April	(Canada) Kailen Sheridan				
July	(Canada) Kailen Sheridan				

=== NWSL Weekly Awards ===
==== NWSL Goal of the Week ====
Week	Result	Player	Ref.
6	Nominated	(Costa Rica) Raquel Rodriguez	
13	Nominated	(United States) Jennifer Hoy	
16	Nominated	(United States) Imani Dorsey	
18	Nominated	(United States) Paige Monaghan	
23	Nominated	(United States) Carli Lloyd	
24	Nominated	(United States) Carli Lloyd	
25	Nominated	(United States) Domi Richardson	

==== NWSL Save of the Week ====
Week	Result	Player	Ref.
2	Won	(Canada) Kailen Sheridan	
3	Won	(Canada) Kailen Sheridan	
4	Nominated	(Canada) Kailen Sheridan	
5	Nominated	(Bosnia and Herzegovina) DiDi Haracic	
6	Nominated	(Bosnia and Herzegovina) DiDi Haracic	
7	Nominated	(Bosnia and Herzegovina) DiDi Haracic	
9	Nominated	(Bosnia and Herzegovina) DiDi Haracic	
10	Nominated	(Bosnia and Herzegovina) DiDi Haracic	
12	Nominated	(Canada) Kailen Sheridan	
14	Nominated	(Canada) Kailen Sheridan	
15	Nominated	(Canada) Kailen Sheridan	
16	Nominated	(Canada) Kailen Sheridan	
17	Nominated	(Canada) Kailen Sheridan	
18	Nominated	(Canada) Kailen Sheridan	
21	Nominated	(Canada) Kailen Sheridan	
23	Nominated	(Canada) Kailen Sheridan	
25	Nominated	(Canada) Kailen Sheridan	

== See also ==
- 2019 National Women's Soccer League season
- 2019 in American soccer
