= The Offseason =

American reality television miniseries

- Genre: Reality television
- Created by: Midge Purce
- Country of origin: United States
- Original language: English
- No. of seasons: 1
- No. of episodes: 6

Production
- Running time: 22–30 minutes
- Production companies: 32 Flavors; Box To Box Films

Original release
- Network: Twitter
- Release: October 18, 2024 – present

The Offseason is an American reality television miniseries created by Midge Purce that follows a group of soccer players in the offseason of the National Women's Soccer League (NWSL). It premiered on Twitter on October 18, 2024.

== Overview ==
Midge Purce and ten other NWSL players live and train together in Miami as they prepare for the NWSL preseason.

| Season | Episodes | Originally released | |
| Season | Episodes | First released | Last released |
|---|---|---|---|
| 1 | 6 | October 18, 2024 | November 22, 2024 |

== Episodes ==
=== Season 1 ===
- Michelle Alozie, Houston Dash
- Lo'eau LaBonta, Kansas City Current
- Paige Nielsen, Angel City FC
- Ifeoma Onumonu, NJ/NY Gotham FC
- Midge Purce, NJ/NY Gotham FC
- María Sánchez, Houston Dash
- Taylor Smith, NJ/NY Gotham FC
- Nikki Stanton, Seattle Reign FC
- Taryn Torres, NJ/NY Gotham FC
- Ally Watt, Orlando Pride
- Kelli Hubly, Portland Thorns

This is a caption
| No. in season | Title | Original release date |
|---|---|---|
| 1 | "Episode 1" | October 18, 2024 |
Michelle Alozie and María Sánchez of the Houston Dash; Lo'eau LaBonta of the Kansas City Current; Paige Nielsen of Angel City FC; Ifeoma Onumonu, Midge Purce, Taylor Smith (soccer)], and Taryn Torres of NJ/NY Gotham FC; Nikki Stanton of Seattle Reign FC; and Ally Watt of the Orlando Pride come together in Miami to prepare for the 2024 season.
| 2 | "Episode 2" | October 25, 2024 |
| 3 | "Episode 3" | November 1, 2024 |
| 4 | "Episode 4" | November 8, 2024 |
| 5 | "Episode 5" | November 15, 2024 |
| 6 | "Episode 6" | November 24, 2024 |

== Production and release ==
In December 2022, Midge Purce invited eleven other NWSL players (Note: Michelle Alozie, Nicole Baxter, Ryan Gareis, Sarah Gorden, Kelli Hubly, Darian Jenkins, Lo'eau LaBonta, Ifeoma Onumonu, Midge Purce, Taylor Smith, Nikki Stanton, and Taryn Torres) to two houses in Jupiter, Florida, as a proof of concept for the show. The players lived together for two weeks and trained in preparation for the 2023 season. Some footage from the fortnight was posted on social media. The following year, Alexis Ohanian and Vanderpump Rules executive producer Alex Baskin joined Purce as executive producers for the project. The Offseason filmed its first season in January 2024 in Miami, Florida, just before the 2024 preseason. The series premiered on Twitter on October 18, 2024.
