= Mónica Flores =

Mexican footballer (born 1996)

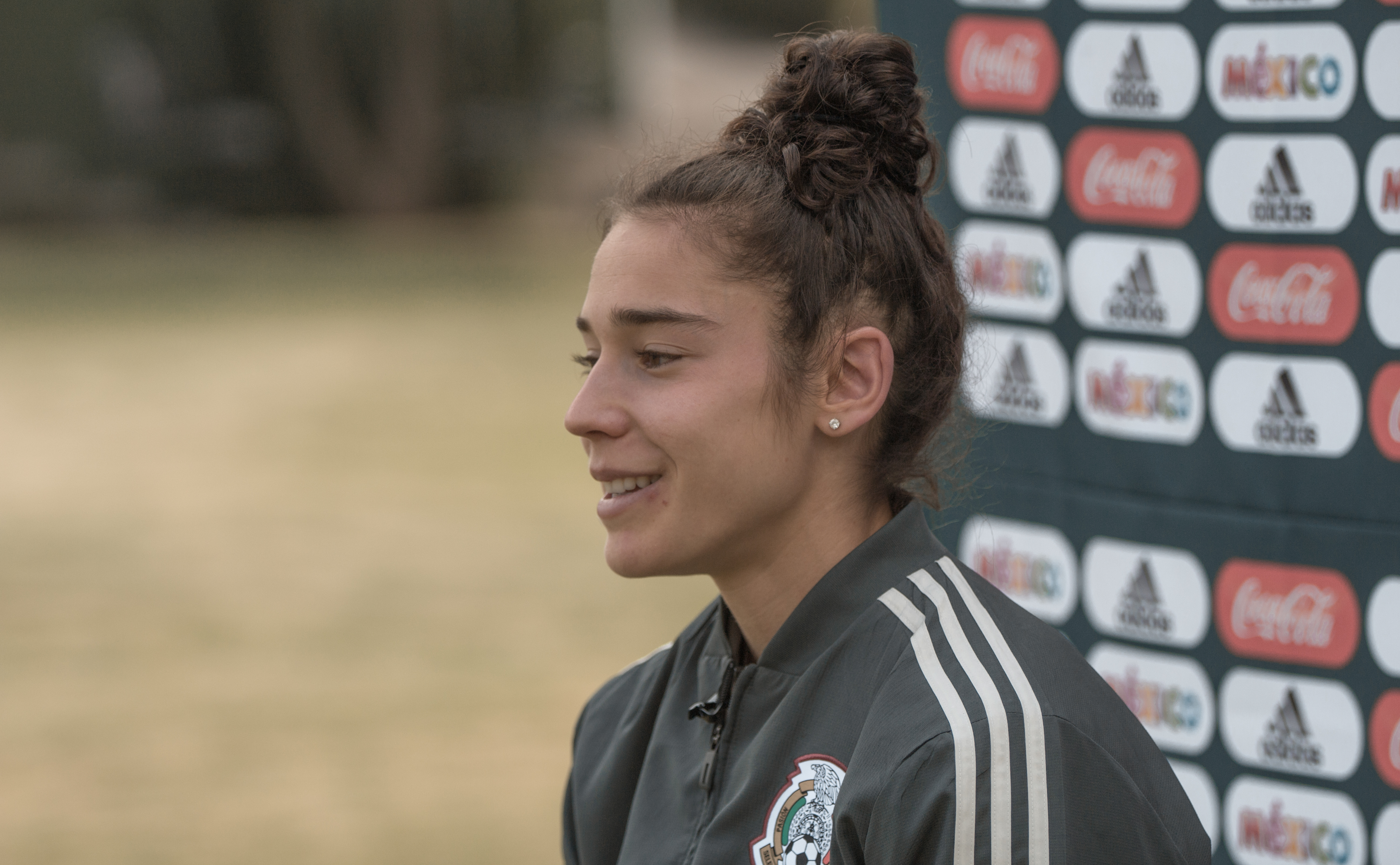

Personal information
- Full name: Mónica Irina Flores Grigoriu
- Date of birth: 31 January 1996 (age 30)
- Place of birth: Livingston, New Jersey United States
- Height: 1.60 m (5 ft 3 in)
- Position: Left-back

College career
Years	Team	Apps	(Gls)
2014–2017	Notre Dame Fighting Irish	55	(1)

Senior career*
Years	Team	Apps	(Gls)
2018–2020	Valencia	35	(0)
2020–2023	Monterrey	93	(2)

International career^{‡}
2015–2016	Mexico U20	8	(0)
2016–2023	Mexico	12	(0)
- * Club domestic league appearances and goals as of 16 August 2020 ‡ National team caps and goals as of 25 November 2017

Mónica Irina Flores Grigoriu (born 31 January 1996) is a former footballer who last played as a left-back for Liga MX Femenil club CF Monterrey. Born in the United States, she played for the Mexico national team.

== International career ==
Flores made her full international debut for Mexico on January 23, 2016.

== Personal life ==
Flores was born to a Mexican father and a Romanian mother. Flores grew up in Livingston, New Jersey and played soccer at Livingston High School. Her twin sister Sabrina Flores represented United States U-20 and they faced each other at the 2015 CONCACAF Women's U-20 Championship and the 2016 FIFA U-20 Women's World Cup. In June 2018, Sabrina joined Mónica in the Mexico national team after doing the one-time international allegiance switch.

== Professional career ==
=== Valencia ===
In 2018, Flores joined Spanish side Valencia where she played for two seasons. On 28 May 2020, via Twitter, Flores announced that she would be leaving Valencia.

=== Monterrey ===
In June 2020, Monterrey announced that Flores would be joining the club for the 2020–21 season.
