= Cassidy Benintente =

American association football player

Personal information
- Date of birth: June 12, 1994 (age 32)
- Place of birth: Jackson Township, New Jersey
- Height: 5 ft 2 in (1.57 m)
- Positions: Defender; midfielder

College career
Years	Team	Apps	(Gls)
2012–2015	Rutgers Scarlet Knights		

Senior career*
Years	Team	Apps	(Gls)
2017–2018	Sky Blue FC	1	(0)
2018	Olimpia Cluj		
2019	Asarum	10	(1)
2020	Sky Blue FC	0	(0)
- * Club domestic league appearances and goals as of June 28, 2020

Cassidy Benintente (born June 12, 1994) is an American former professional soccer player who last played as a defender and midfielder for Sky Blue FC of the National Women's Soccer League (NWSL).

Raised in Jackson Township, New Jersey, Benitente played prep soccer at Jackson Liberty High School.
