= Midge Purce =

American soccer player (born 1995)

- Purce with Gotham FC in 2026

Personal information
- Full name: Margaret Melinda Williams-Purce
- Date of birth: September 18, 1995 (age 31)
- Place of birth: Silver Spring, Maryland, United States
- Height: 5 ft 5 in (1.65 m)
- Positions: Winger; right back

Team information
- Current team: Gotham FC
- Number: 23

College career
Years	Team	Apps	(Gls)
2013–2016	Harvard Crimson	69	(42)

Senior career*
Years	Team	Apps	(Gls)
2017	Boston Breakers	22	(1)
2018–2019	Portland Thorns	41	(8)
2020–	Gotham FC (Note: Sky Blue FC changed its name to NJ/NY Gotham FC in 2021)	95	(21)

International career^{‡}
2011–2012	United States U17		
2013–2014	United States U20		
2015–2018	United States U23		
2019–	United States	30	(4)
- * Club domestic league appearances and goals as of November 1, 2026 ‡ National team caps and goals as of March 10, 2024

Margaret Melinda "Midge" Williams-Purce (born September 18, 1995) is an American soccer player who plays as a winger or right back for Gotham FC of the National Women's Soccer League (NWSL) and the United States national team. She previously played for Portland Thorns FC and the Boston Breakers. The Most Valuable Player of Gotham's 2023 NWSL Championship, she is known for her strength on the ball and her willingness to defend from the attack.

She was first selected to play for the United States at the under-17 level, appearing at the 2012 FIFA U-17 Women's World Cup and the 2014 FIFA U-20 Women's World Cup. She made her first appearance for the senior national team in 2019, following a strong season with the Thorns.

She played college soccer at Harvard University. In 2022, she was elected to a six-year term on the Board of Overseers of Harvard University with the support of Harvard Forward, an alumni climate activism group. She is an outspoken advocate for equal pay and is a co-founder and board member of the Black Women's Players Collective.

== Early life ==
Purce is the daughter of James Purce, and has an older brother, JP Purce. She began playing soccer as a child, following in the footsteps of her brother. She attended Parkland Magnet Middle School for Aerospace Technology in Silver Spring, Maryland. She also attended Our Lady of Good Counsel Catholic High School in Olney, Maryland, near her hometown of Silver Spring, Maryland where she was named Maryland Gatorade Player of the Year in 2012 and an NSCAA All-American in 2010 and 2011.

== College career ==
Purce scored 42 goals in 69 appearances with the Harvard Crimson women's soccer team. She was named Ivy League Player of the Year in both 2015 and 2016 and a first-team NSCAA All-American in 2016. She majored in psychology at Harvard in pursuit of a career in law.

== Club career ==
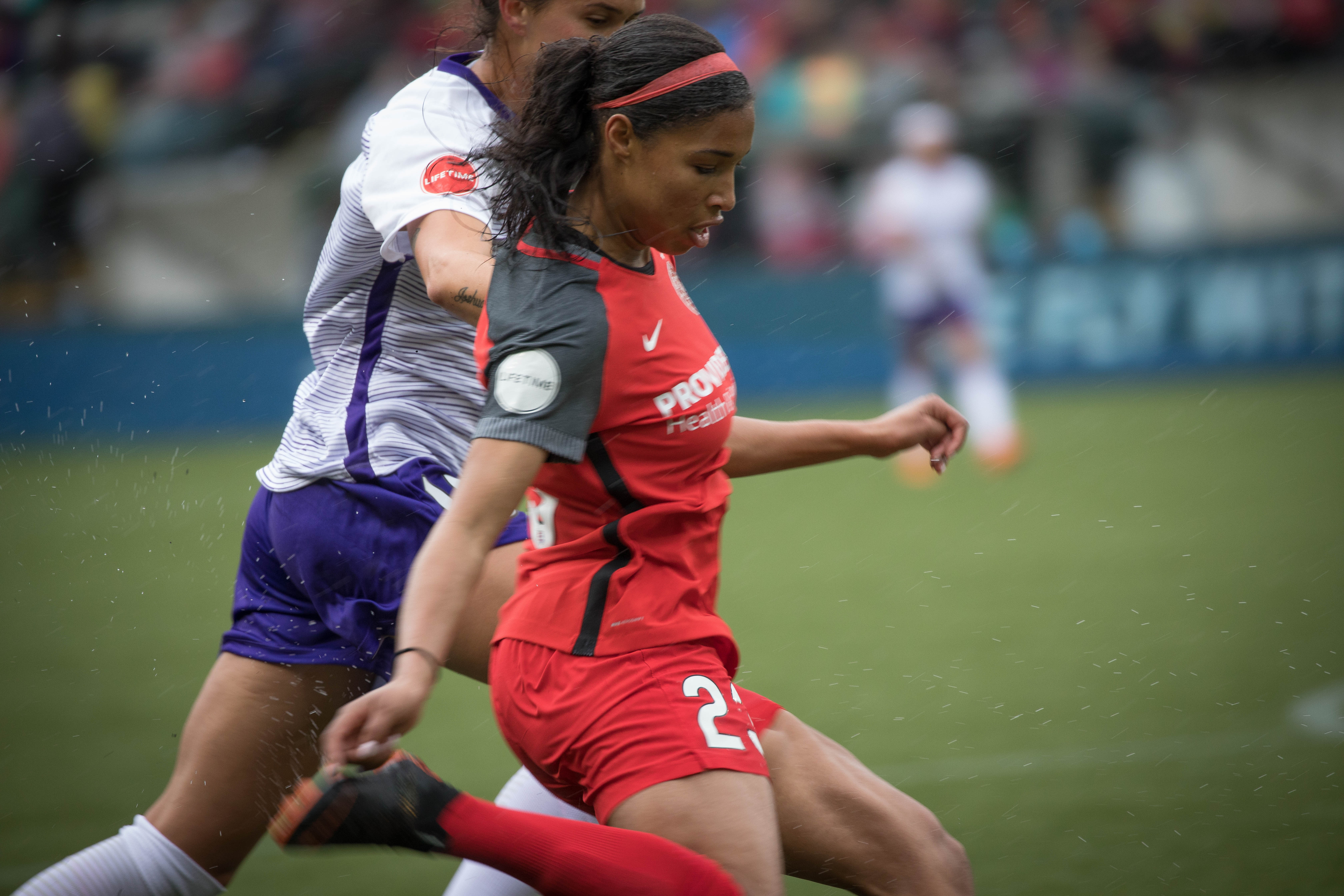
Purce with Portland in 2018

=== Boston Breakers, 2017 ===
After playing for Harvard, Purce was drafted by the Boston Breakers with the 9th pick in the 2017 NWSL College Draft. She appeared in 22 games for Boston and scored one goal.

=== Portland Thorns FC, 2018–2019 ===
After the Breakers folded in January 2018, the league held a dispersal draft for the Breakers' players; Purce was selected with the 4th pick by the Portland Thorns.

Purce made 21 appearances and 16 starts for the Thorns in 2018, playing primarily as a right fullback. During the 2019 NWSL season, Purce moved into wide and central forward positions, and at one point scored 5 goals in a span of 5 games.

=== Gotham FC, 2020–present ===
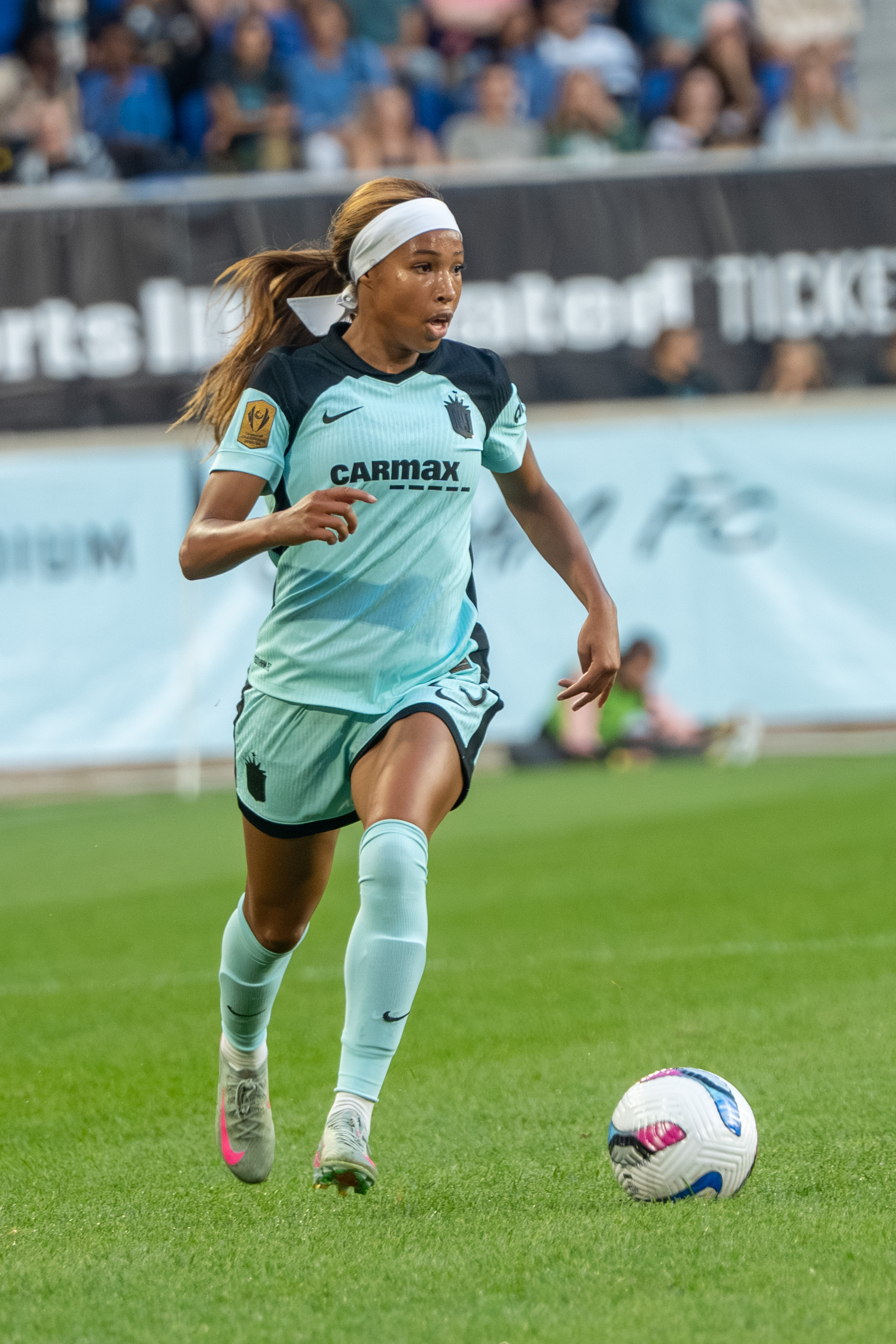
Midge Purce with Gotham FC in 2025

Purce was traded to Sky Blue FC in 2020. During the 2021 NWSL season Purce played as a forward and scored nine goals, leading the team. She came in second in the NWSL Golden Boot race and was named to the NWSL Best XI in the 2021 NWSL Awards alongside teammates Caprice Dydasco and Kailen Sheridan. Purce was also a finalist for 2021 NWSL MVP following a breakout season.

In January 2022, Purce signed a two-year contract extension with NJ/NY Gotham FC. Though sidelined through much of the 2023 NWSL season after tearing her quad, Purce was instrumental in Gotham FC's NWSL playoff run. She assisted both goals in Gotham FC's 1-2 Championship win over OL Reign and was named the Championship MVP. While at Gotham FC, Purce established a reputation as a strong dribbler and a dynamic, attacking player who is willing to take on defensive responsibilities.

Purce found her 2024 season curtailed prematurely after injuring her ACL in a match against the Portland Thorns FC near the beginning of the year. After missing a season, she returned to the field in March 2025 and recorded an assist in her second game back. During her time in recovery, Purce signed a new contract with Gotham FC that kept her for an additional year.

In May 2025, Purce scored her first goal since her injury return in the semifinals of the 2024–25 CONCACAF W Champions Cup, drawing and scoring a penalty in a 3–1 win against Club América. In the final against Tigres, she again drew a penalty but had it saved by Itzel González. Gotham went on to win 1–0 and become the inaugural winners of the competition.

On November 1, 2026, the last day of the season, Purce set up both goals in a 2–0 win over the Utah Royals as Gotham secured their first NWSL Shield.

== International career ==
=== Youth USWNT (2011–2018) ===
Purce was called up to the United States women's national under-17, under-20, and under-23 teams. She played in the 2012 FIFA U-17 Women's World Cup, made 4 appearances and 3 starts in the 2014 FIFA U-20 Women's World Cup, and scored goals for the US U20s against France in a friendly and against Mexico in the 2014 CONCACAF U20 Championship.

=== Senior USWNT (2017–) ===
Purce received her first call-up to the United States women's national team for the 2017 Tournament of Nations but she did not appear in any of the three games. She received another call-up in June 2018 for a pair of friendlies against China PR, but she sustained an ankle injury in training camp and was ruled out for the two friendlies.

In November 2019, Purce received a call-up to Vlatko Andonovski's first training camp as the new USWNT head coach. After playing as a right-back and a forward during her professional career, she was called in as a defender. Purce played in her first match for the United States women's national team in their friendly against Costa Rica on November 10, 2019. She played the full 90 minutes of the game as right back, and had a cross deflected in for a Costa Rica own goal in the U.S. team's 6–0 victory. Purce scored her first senior national team goal against Colombia on January 21, 2021.

In November 2021, Purce was called up to her first senior national team camp as a forward. She has appeared in 25 games for the national team, winning the 2021, 2022, and 2023 editions of the SheBelieves Cup as well as the 2022 CONCACAF W Championship with the United States. Following an injury in April 2023, Purce was not selected for the 2023 FIFA Women's World Cup squad.

== Advocacy ==
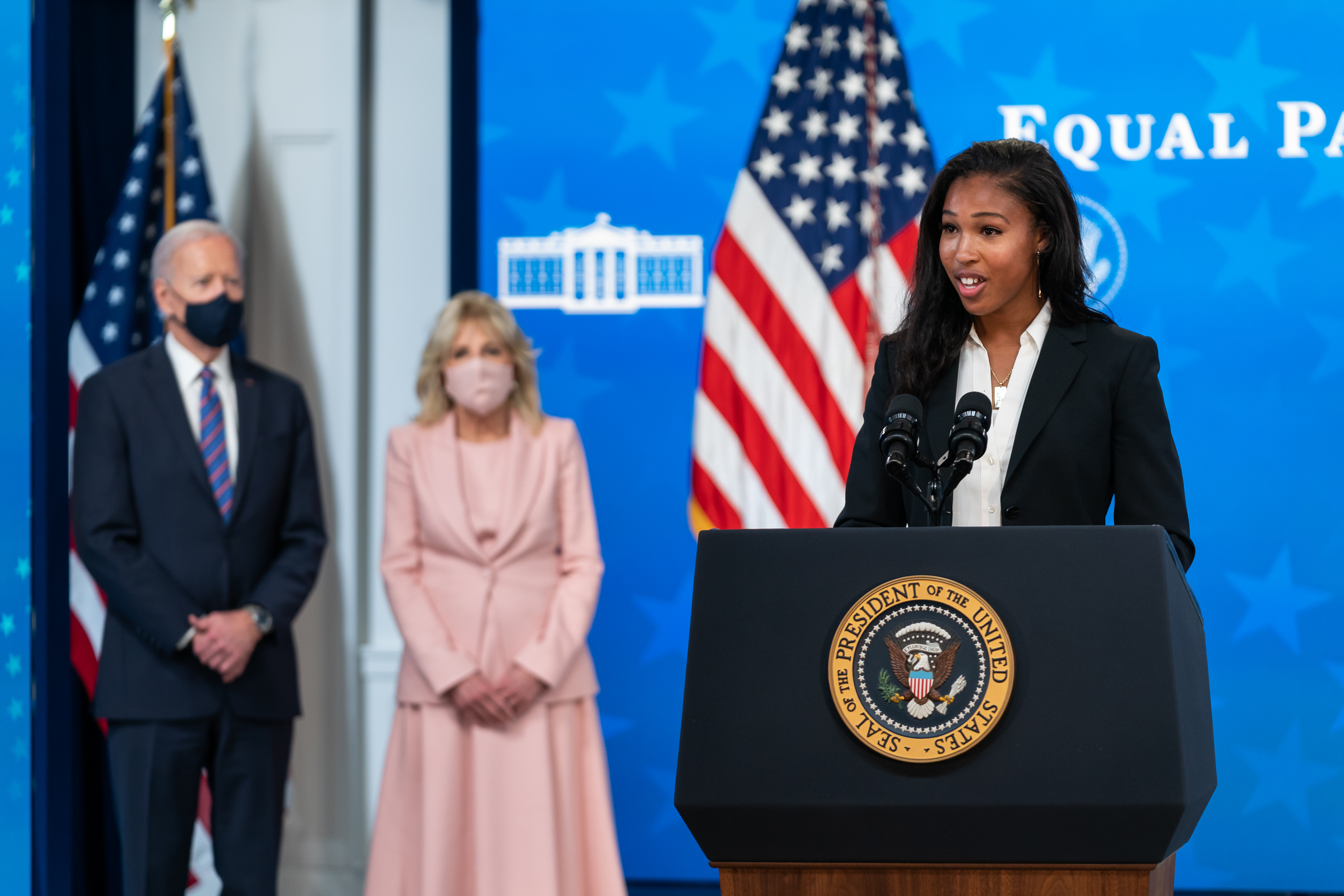
Purce delivers remarks during a virtual Equal Pay Day event Wednesday, March 24, 2021 at the White House.

Purce is currently serving a six-year term as a member of the Board of Overseers at Harvard University. She was elected in 2020 with the support of Harvard Forward, an alumni climate activism group. Purce co-founded and currently serves as a board member for the Black Women's Players Collective (BWPC), a nonprofit with the goal of advancing opportunities for black girls in sport and beyond. She was named to the 2023 Forbes 30 under 30 list in the Sports category for her work with the BWPC.

On March 24, 2021, Purce made an appearance at the White House with USWNT teammate Megan Rapinoe to raise awareness of the importance of equal pay. In her remarks to introduce First Lady Jill Biden, Purce said, "You would never expect a flower to bloom without water, but women in sport who have been denied water, sunlight, and soil are somehow expected to blossom. Invest in women, then let's talk again when you see the return."

== Media ==
Purce is the creator of The Offseason, a reality television starring NWSL players in training before the new season, which premiered in 2024.

In April 2026, Purce's podcast with Vox Media, Confessions of an Elite Athletes, launched. The podcast will release two episodes a month and gives athletes the chance to open up about their real experiences in their sport.

== Career statistics ==
=== Club ===
As of March 24, 2024

Club	Season	League			Cup (Note: Includes the NWSL Challenge Cup)		Playoffs (Note: Includes NWSL Playoffs)		Other		Total	
Club	Season	Division	Apps	Goals	Apps	Goals	Apps	Goals	Apps	Goals	Apps	Goals
Boston Breakers	2017	NWSL	22	1	—		—		—		22	1
Portland Thorns FC	2018	NWSL	19	0	—		2	0	—		21	0
Portland Thorns FC	2019	NWSL	22	8	—		1	0	—		23	8
Portland Thorns FC	Total		63	9	0	0	3	0	0	0	66	9
Gotham FC	2020	NWSL	—		5	0	—		4 (Note: Includes the NWSL Fall Series)	1	9	1
Gotham FC	2021	NWSL	17	9	4	2	1	0	—		22	11
Gotham FC	2022	NWSL	16	3	5	1	—		—		21	4
Gotham FC	2023	NWSL	12	4	5	1	3	0	—		20	5
Gotham FC	2024	NWSL	1	0	1	0	—		—		2	0
Gotham FC	2025	NWSL	0	0	0	0	0	0	0	0	0	0
Gotham FC	Total		46	16	20	4	4	0	0	0	70	20
Career total			109	25	20	4	7	0	4	1	140	30

=== International ===
As of match played March 10, 2024

National Team	Year	Apps	Goals
United States	2019	1	0
United States	2020	1	0
United States	2021	7	2
United States	2022	11	2
United States	2023	6	0
United States	2024	4	0
Total		30	4

Scores and results list United States's goal tally first, score column indicates score after each Purce goal.

List of international goals scored by Midge Purce
No.	Date	Venue	Opponent	Score	Result	Competition	Ref.
1	January 22, 2021	Orlando, Florida	Colombia	6–0	6–0	Friendly	
2	June 13, 2021	Orlando, Florida	Jamaica	3–0	4–0	Friendly	
3	April 12, 2022	Chester, Pennsylvania	Uzbekistan	8–0	9–0	Friendly	
4	July 4, 2022	San Nicolás de los Garza, Mexico	Haiti	3–0	3–0	2022 CONCACAF W Championship	

== Honors and awards ==
Gotham FC

- NWSL Championship: 2023, 2025
- NWSL Shield: 2026
- NWSL Challenge Cup: 2026
- CONCACAF W Champions Cup: 2024–25

United States

- CONCACAF Women's Championship: 2022
- CONCACAF W Gold Cup: 2024
- SheBelieves Cup: 2021; 2022; 2023

Individual

- NWSL Team of the Month: June 2019, August 2019
- NWSL Player of the Week: 2019 week 19, 2021 week 1, 2021 week 21
- NWSL Goal of the Week: 2019 week 8
- Portland Thorns Supporters' Player Of The Year: 2019
- NWSL Best XI First Team: 2021
- NWSL Championship Game MVP: 2023
