= Imani Dorsey =

American soccer player (born 1996)

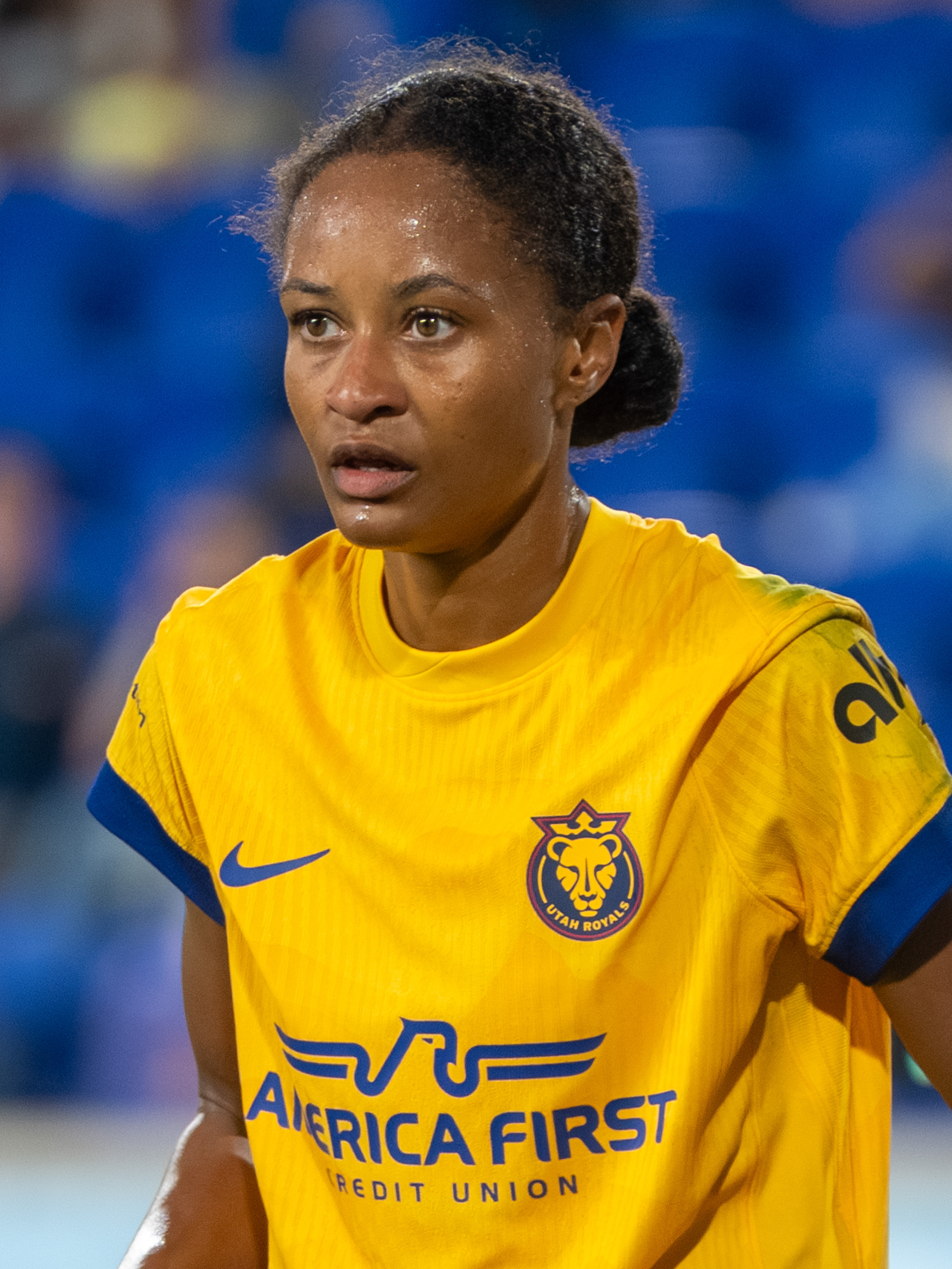
- Dorsey with the Utah Royals in 2025

Personal information
- Full name: Imani Michelle Dorsey
- Date of birth: March 21, 1996 (age 30)
- Place of birth: Elkridge, Maryland, United States
- Height: 5 ft 7 in (1.70 m)
- Positions: Forward; defender

College career
Years	Team	Apps	(Gls)
2014–2017	Duke Blue Devils	87	(29)

Senior career*
Years	Team	Apps	(Gls)
2015	Washington Spirit Reserves		(8)
2018–2023	NJ/NY Gotham FC	72	(6)
2024–2025	Utah Royals	19	(0)

International career^{‡}
2018–2019	United States U23		
2021	United States	1	(0)
- * Club domestic league appearances and goals as of November 3, 2025 ‡ National team caps and goals as of July 20, 2023

Imani Michelle Dorsey (born March 21, 1996) is an American former professional soccer player who played as a defender. Dorsey played college soccer for Duke University, where she was a semifinalist for the MAC Herman Trophy. She was selected by Sky Blue FC with the 5th overall pick in the 2018 NWSL College Draft and named the 2018 Rookie of the Year. In total, Dorsey made 72 appearances for NJ/NY Gotham FC.

Dorsey did not play during the 2023 NWSL season, making use of the league's mental health leave policy. Following the 2023 season, Dorsey became a free agent and signed with the Utah Royals.

Following a strong 2020 NWSL season, Dorsey made her first appearance for the United States women's national soccer team (USWNT) in a friendly against Australia. That same year, Dorsey won the United States Soccer Federation's One Nation. Social Impact Award, which honors "a player from U.S. Soccer's National Team programs for their off-field contributions making a positive impact in the areas of diversity, equity, inclusion and belonging" for her work with the Black Women's Players Collective.

== College career ==
Dorsey played for Duke University from 2014 to 2017. In 2017 she was named ACC Offensive Player of the Year, was a United Soccer Coaches All-American, and was a semifinalist for the MAC Hermann Trophy, among other accolades. She finished her career ranked fourth all time in career goals at Duke.

== Club career ==
In 2015 she played for the Washington Spirit Reserves in the W-League. She scored eight goals, helping the team win the W-League Championship. She was named W-League Rookie of the Year.

=== NJ/NY Gotham FC, 2018–2023 ===
Dorsey was selected by Sky Blue FC with the 5th overall pick in the 2018 NWSL College Draft. She joined the team in May after completing her degree at Duke University and was added to the active roster as a National Team Replacement Player on June 1, 2018. Dorsey received a full professional contract on June 15. On July 7 she scored her first NWSL goal against the Chicago Red Stars. After scoring four goals and one assist while maintaining a 74.4% passing accuracy in 332 passes, she was named 2018 NWSL Rookie of the Year. Dorsey was the second Sky Blue player to win Rookie of the Year, after Raquel Rodriguez won it in 2016.

Primarily playing in the attack through her college career and rookie year, Dorsey began playing as an outside back during the 2019 season, in part due to interest from the United States women's national team. Dorsey made 72 league appearances for the club, which was re-branded as NJ/NY Gotham FC preceding the 2021 NWSL season. Dorsey did not play in the 2023 season, making use of the league's excused absence policy due to mental health concerns.

=== Utah Royals, 2024–2025 ===
Dorsey was named a free agent following the completion of 2023 season. She signed a contract with the Utah Royals on November 29, 2023, becoming the sixth player on the newly re-formed Utah Royals team. She is in contract through 2025. On March 22, 2024, while playing against NC Courage, Dorsey ruptured her Achilles tendon. Royals coach Amy Rodriguez said that Dorsey will be out "for the foreseeable future.". On October 21, 2025, it was announced via social media that Dorsey was retiring; "The curtain closes on a spectacular career. Congratulations Imani Dorsey, and thank you for everything you've given this sport and to our community!!"

== International career ==
Dorsey trained with the United States youth national teams beginning at the U-15 level. On August 23, 2018, Dorsey was named to the United States U-23 team for the 2018 Nordic tournament.

Following a strong 2019 NWSL season, Dorsey received her first senior call-up to the United States national team on October 31, 2019, earning her place on Vlatko Andonovski's first roster as head coach. Dorsey made her first appearance for the team on November 30, 2021, in a friendly against Australia. That same year, Dorsey won the United States Soccer Federation's One Nation. Social Impact Award, which honors "a player from U.S. Soccer's National Team programs for their off-field contributions making a positive impact in the areas of diversity, equity, inclusion and belonging" for her work with the Black Women's Players Collective.

== Advocacy ==
Dorsey is a founding board member of the Black Women's Players Collective (BWPC), a 501(c)(3) "created by the black players in the National Women's Soccer League (NWSL) to advance opportunities for black girls in sport and beyond." She has spearheaded efforts including the construction of 12 mini pitches in cities across the United States and the Voices in Sport mentorship program, which connects young black female athletes with established pros.

Dorsey served on the bargaining committee for the NWSL Players Associations's 2022-2026 collective bargaining agreement, the first in league history. She also serves as an Athlete Ally ambassador and received a 2021 Athlete Ally Action Award for her advocacy on behalf of the LGBT community, particularly transgender athletes.

== Career statistics ==
=== International ===
As of match played November 30, 2021

National Team	Year	Apps	Goals
United States	2021	1	0
Total		1	0
