= Ifeoma Onumonu =

Nigerian footballer (born 1994)

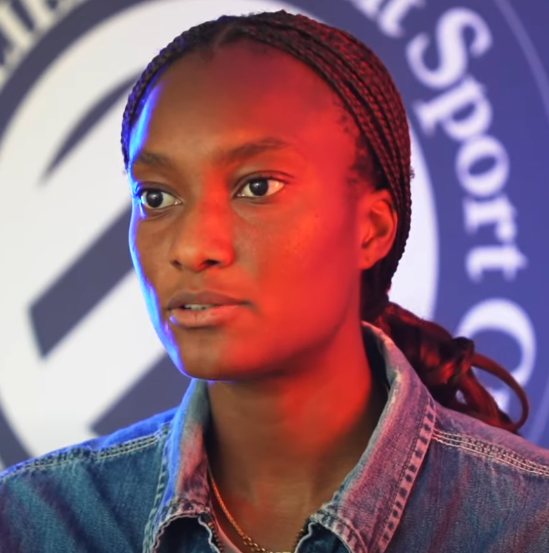
- Onumonu in 2024

Personal information
- Full name: Ifeoma Chukwufumnaya Onumonu
- Date of birth: 25 February 1994 (age 32)
- Place of birth: Rancho Cucamonga, California, United States,
- Height: 1.78 m (5 ft 10 in)
- Position: Forward

College career
Years	Team	Apps	(Gls)
2012–2016	California Golden Bears	82	(33)

Senior career*
Years	Team	Apps	(Gls)
2017	Boston Breakers	18	(0)
2018–2019	Portland Thorns	8	(0)
2019	Reign FC	20	(2)
2020–2023	Gotham FC	55	(8)
2024	Utah Royals	5	(0)
2024–2025	Montpellier	20	(7)
Total		126	(17)

International career
2017	United States U23		
2021–2025	Nigeria	32	(5)
- * Club domestic league appearances and goals as of 04:29, 19 September 2025 (UTC)

Ifeoma Chukwufumnaya Onumonu OON (born 25 February 1994) is a former professional footballer who played as a forward. Born in the United States, she played for the Nigeria national team for four years. With the Super Falcons, Onumonu participated in the 2023 FIFA Women's World Cup, 2024 Summer Olympics, and contributed to a 2024 Women's Africa Cup of Nations win.

Onumonu played college soccer for the California Golden Bears before being selected by the Boston Breakers in the 2017 NWSL College Draft. She then played for fellow NWSL clubs Portland Thorns FC, Reign FC, Gotham FC, and the Utah Royals before completing her career with Première Ligue club Montpellier HSC.

== Club career ==
After playing collegiately at the University of California, Berkeley, Onumonu was drafted by the Boston Breakers with the 8th overall pick in the 2017 NWSL College Draft. She appeared in 18 games for Boston in her rookie season.

After the Boston Breakers folded ahead of the 2018 season, Onumonu was selected by the Portland Thorns in the 2018 Dispersal Draft. She was waived on 8 May 2019, after playing in eight games.

On 14 May 2019, Onumonu signed with Reign FC as a National Team Replacement player. After stellar performances, she earned a supplemental roster spot on 28 June.

On 17 January 2020, Onumonu was traded to Sky Blue FC. She re-signed with the team on a one-year deal on 20 January 2022 based on her strong performance during the 2021 NWSL season, which saw her named to the Best XI Second Team. On 25 October 2022, Onumonu signed a new three-year contract that would keep her with Gotham FC through the 2025 season.

On 30 December 2023, Onumonu was traded to Utah Royals for $40,000 in allocation money.

On 9 September 2024, Montpellier HSC announced that they had signed Onumonu as a free agent.

Onumonu announced her retirement from professional football via social media in October 2025.

== International career ==
Onumonu has represented the United States on the Under-23 Women's National Team. In June 2021 she received her first call up to the Nigeria Women's National Team.

On 16 June 2023, she was included in the 23-player Nigerian squad for the 2023 FIFA Women's World Cup.

Onumonu was initially named as an alternate for Nigeria's squad at the 2024 Summer Olympics, but was later elevated to the full 18-player roster after Halimatu Ayinde dropped out due to injury.

== Personal life ==
In 2024, Onumonu appeared in the first season of The Offseason, a reality television series following a group of NWSL players training before the new season.

== International goals ==
No.	Date	Venue	Opponent	Score	Result	Competition
1.	18 February 2022	Moshood Abiola National Stadium, Abuja, Nigeria	Ivory Coast	1–0	2–0	2022 Women's Africa Cup of Nations qualification
2.	18 February 2022	Moshood Abiola National Stadium, Abuja, Nigeria	Ivory Coast	2−0	2–0	2022 Women's Africa Cup of Nations qualification
3.	11 April 2022	Starlight Stadium, Langford, Canada	Canada	1–0	2–2	Friendly
4.	7 July 2022	Stade Moulay Hassan, Rabat, Morocco	Botswana	1–0	2–0	2022 Women's Africa Cup of Nations
5.	30 November 2024	Stade Raymond Kopa, Angers, France	France	1–2	1–2	Friendly

== Honours ==
NJ/NY Gotham FC

- NWSL Championship: 2023

Nigeria

- Women's Africa Cup of Nations: 2024

Individual

- NWSL Best XI Second Team: 2021
- NWSL Team of the Month: June 2019, August 2021
- NWSL Player of the Week: 2019 week 10, 2021 week 13

Orders

- Officer of the Order of the Niger
