= Sabrina Flores =

Mexican professional footballer (born 1996)

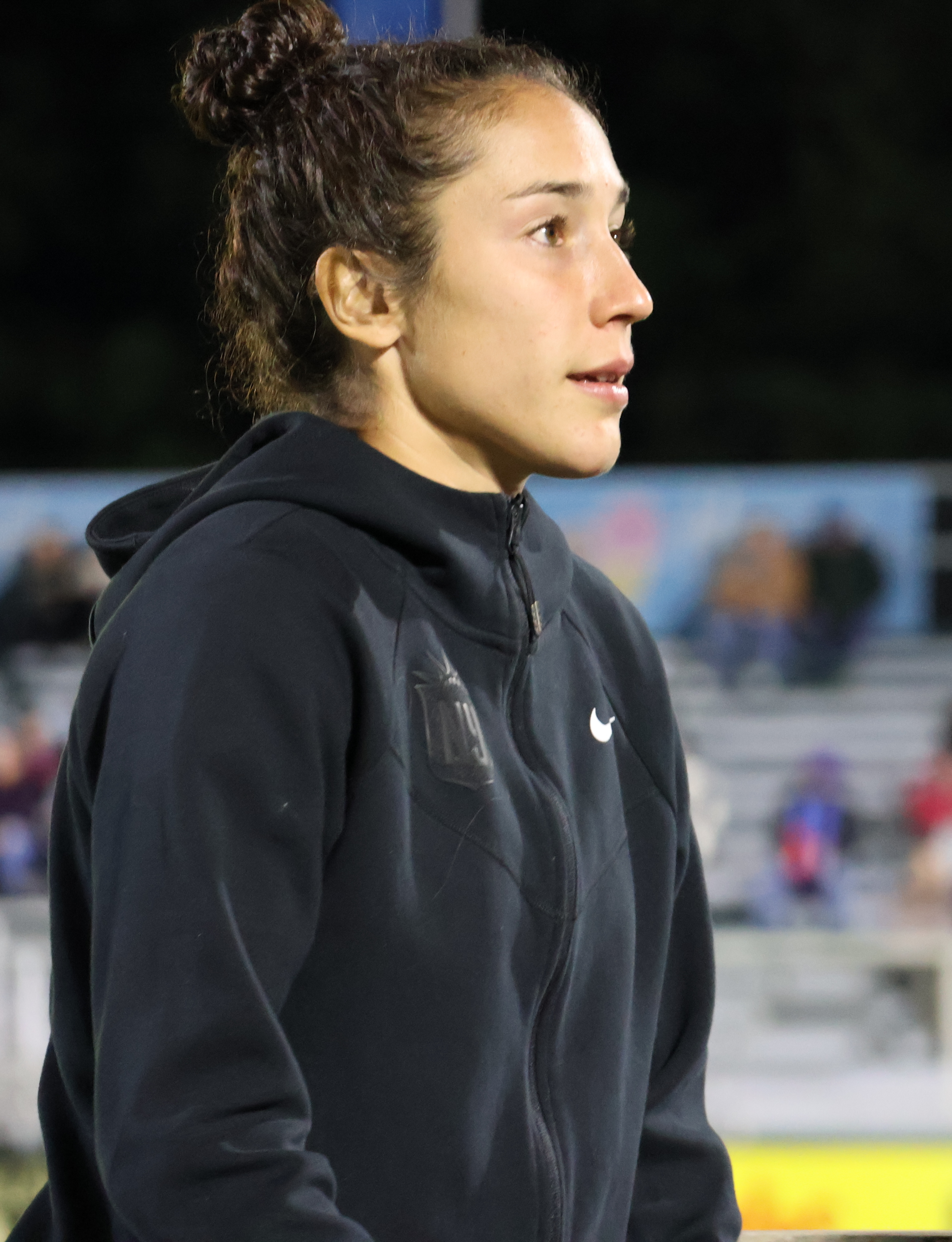
- Flores with Gotham in 2023

Personal information
- Full name: Sabrina Inés Flores Grigoriu
- Date of birth: 31 January 1996 (age 30)
- Place of birth: Livingston, New Jersey, United States
- Height: 1.60 m (5 ft 3 in)
- Positions: Midfielder; defender

College career
Years	Team	Apps	(Gls)
2014–2018	Notre Dame Fighting Irish	82	(5)

Senior career*
Years	Team	Apps	(Gls)
2018	LA Galaxy OC	8	(0)
2019	Sky Blue FC	4	(0)
2019–2020	Sevilla	13	(0)
2020–2023	NJ/NY Gotham FC	11	(0)

International career^{‡}
2015–2016	United States U20	2	(0)
2018	Mexico	1	(0)
- * Club domestic league appearances and goals as of 18 April 2023 ‡ National team caps and goals as of 3 December 2016

Sabrina Inés Flores Grigoriu (Note: In this Spanish name, the first or paternal surname is Flores and the second or maternal family name is Grigoriu.) (born 31 January 1996) is a retired footballer who played as a defender. Born in the United States, she represents the Mexico national team.

== Personal life ==
Born in Livingston, New Jersey to a Mexican father and a Romanian mother, Flores graduated from Livingston High School. Sabrina and her twin sister, Monica Flores, both attended and played for Notre Dame.

While representing United States U-20, she faced her twin sister, who represented Mexico U-20, at the 2015 CONCACAF Women's U-20 Championship and the 2016 FIFA U-20 Women's World Cup.
