= Domi Richardson =

American soccer player (born 1992)

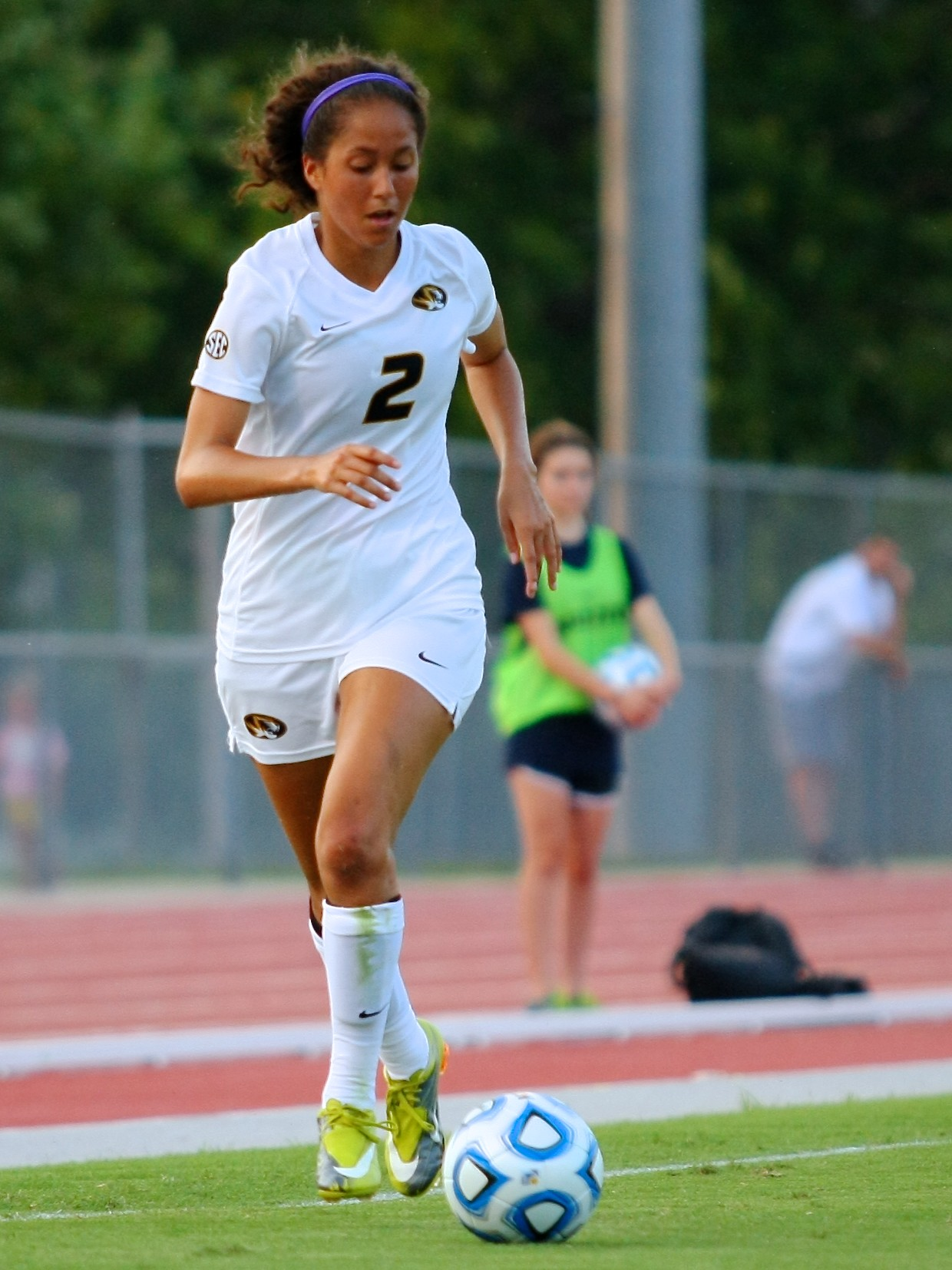
- Richardson in 2013

Personal information
- Full name: Dominique Elyse Richardson
- Date of birth: October 18, 1992 (age 34)
- Place of birth: Fullerton, California, United States
- Height: 1.68 m (5 ft 6 in)
- Position: Defender

College career
Years	Team	Apps	(Gls)
2010–2013	Missouri Tigers	82	(17)

Senior career*
Years	Team	Apps	(Gls)
2014	Houston Dash	2	(0)
2015	FC Kansas City	0	(0)
2016–2022	NJ/NY Gotham FC	42	(2)
2024–2025	Tampa Bay Sun	5	(0)

International career
2011	United States U20		
- * Club domestic league appearances and goals as of June __, 2025

Dominique Elyse Richardson (born October 18, 1992) is an American soccer player who plays as a defender. She previously played in the National Women's Soccer League (NWSL) for the Houston Dash and NJ/NY Gotham FC (formerly Sky Blue FC).

== Club career ==
=== Houston Dash, 2014 ===
Richardson signed with the Houston Dash after participating in open tryouts. She played in 2 games before being released by the club in May 2014.

=== FC Kansas City, 2015 ===
Richardson signed with FC Kansas City as a discovery player in 2015. She was on the roster but never appeared in a game for FCKC. She was waived by the club on July 17, 2015

=== NJ/NY Gotham FC, 2016–2022 ===
Richardson signed with Sky Blue FC in 2016. The team changed its name to NJ/NY Gotham FC in 2021.

=== Tampa Bay Sun FC, 2024– ===
On April 23, 2024, Richardson was announced was announced as one of the first-ever signings for Tampa Bay Sun, who will begin play in the USL Super League in August 2024. Richardson was joined by Erika Tymrak and Jordyn Listro.

== Honors ==
FC Kansas City

- NWSL Championship: 2015

Tampa Bay Sun

- USL Super League: 2024–25
