= Kenie Wright =

American soccer player

Personal information
- Full name: Makenzie Wright
- Date of birth: August 14, 1997 (age 29)
- Place of birth: Mount Laurel, New Jersey, United States
- Height: 5 ft 3 in (1.60 m)
- Position: Midfielder

College career
Years	Team	Apps	(Gls)
2015–2018	Rutgers Scarlet Knights	88	(2)

Senior career*
Years	Team	Apps	(Gls)
2019–2021	NJ/NY Gotham FC	5	(0)
- * Club domestic league appearances and goals

Makenzie "Kenie" Wright (born August 14, 1997) is an American former soccer player who played as a midfielder for NJ/NY Gotham FC in the National Women's Soccer League.

== Career ==
=== High school ===
Born and raised in Mount Laurel, New Jersey, Wright attended Lenape High School.

=== Professional ===
Wright was drafted by Sky Blue FC in the 4th round of the 2019 NWSL College Draft.
