= Gina Lewandowski =

American soccer player (born 1985)

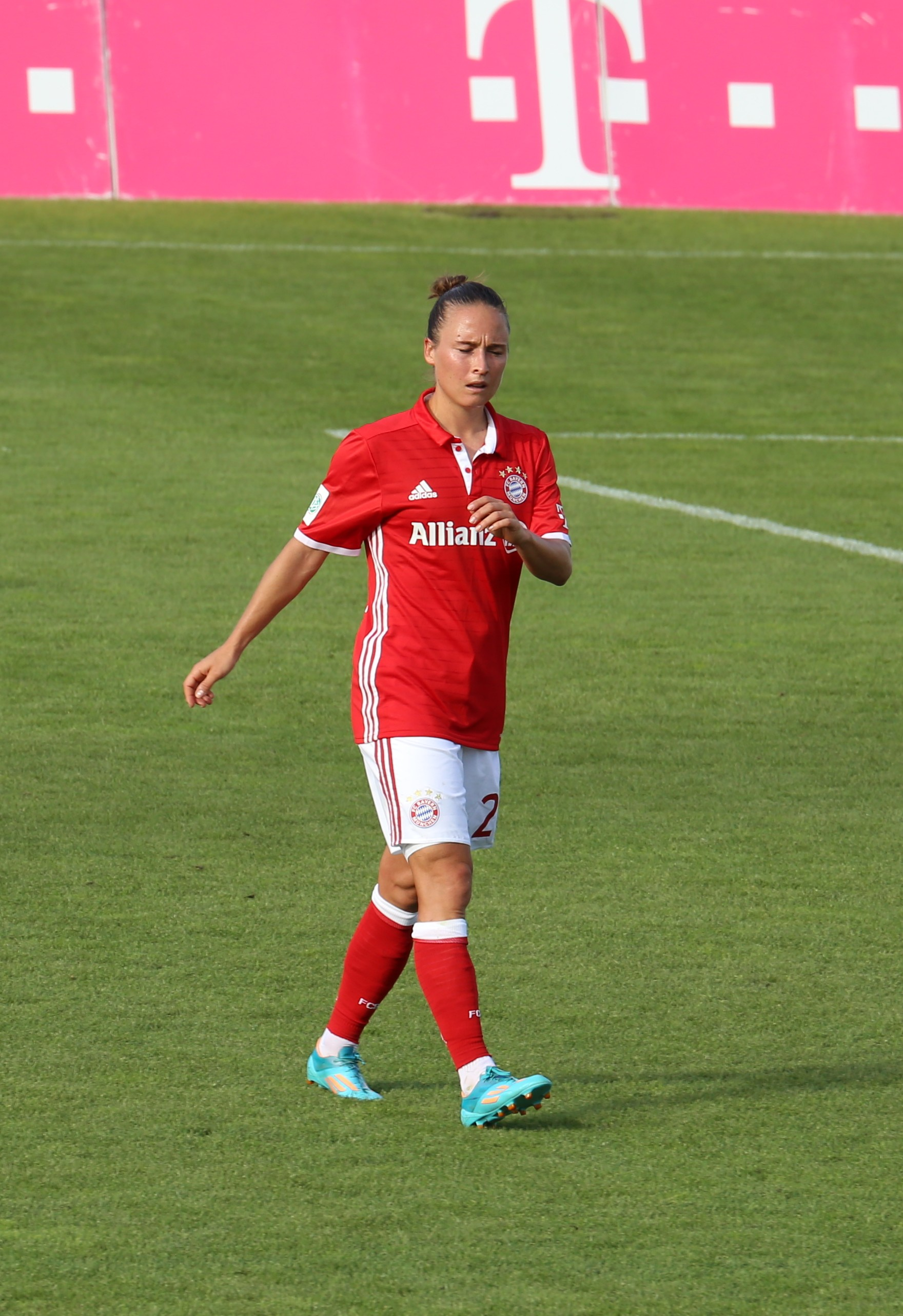
- Lewandowski playing for Bayern Munich in 2016

Personal information
- Full name: Gina Loren Lewandowski
- Date of birth: April 13, 1985 (age 41)
- Place of birth: Bethlehem, Pennsylvania, U.S.
- Height: 5 ft 7 in (1.70 m)
- Positions: Midfielder; defender

College career
Years	Team	Apps	(Gls)
2003–2006	Lehigh Mountain Hawks	70	(36)

Senior career*
Years	Team	Apps	(Gls)
2006	Northampton Laurels	23	(3)
2007	Charlotte Lady Eagles	16	(2)
2007–2012	1. FFC Frankfurt	83	(2)
2011	Western New York Flash	8	(0)
2012–2019	Bayern Munich	116	(18)
2019–2022	NJ/NY Gotham FC	38	(0)

International career
2015	United States	1	(0)

Managerial career
- 2022–2024: Lehigh (Asst./assoc. head coach)
- 2025–: Notre Dame (assistant)
- * Club domestic league appearances and goals

Gina Loren Lewandowski (born April 13, 1985) is an American former soccer player who is currently an assistant coach for the Notre Dame Fighting Irish.

== Early life and education ==
Lewandowski was born in Bethlehem, Pennsylvania, was raised in nearby Coopersburg, Pennsylvania. She graduated from Allentown Central Catholic High School in Allentown, Pennsylvania.

She attended Lehigh University in Bethlehem, where she received a degree in biology. She is of Polish ancestry. Despite sharing the same last name and at one point playing simultaneously at Bayern Munich, she is not related to Robert Lewandowski.

=== Collegiate career ===
Lewandowski played her collegial soccer at Lehigh University, where she was named Patriot League Offensive Player of the Year in 2004 and 2005 and Patriot League Rookie of the Year in 2003. She led all scorers in the league in 2004 with eight goals and 16 points. She finished her college career with 36 goals and 8 assists in 70 games. She then played for the Northampton Laurels in 2006.

== Professional career ==
Following university Lewandowski tried outs for two teams in Germany, heading overseas on May 22, 2007. Her desire to play lead her to "... go over and see where it takes me," Lewandowski said, "It's just a leap of faith."

=== 1. FFC Frankfurt ===
Following a successful trial, the four-time All-Patriot League moved to 1. FFC Frankfurt with fellow American Alexandra Krieger on July 30, 2007. While at Frankfurt Lewandowski won the treble in 2007–08 (Bundesliga-Pokal-Champions League). She helped Frankfurt win the Pokal again in 2011. Lewandowski also went on to another Champion's League final in 2011–12, losing to Lyon.

=== Western New York Flash ===
Lewandowski left Frankfurt to play one season in the Women's Professional Soccer (WPS) league in the summer of 2011. She appeared 8 times for the Western New York Flash and helped the club win both the league and the championship. The WPS folded in the following off-season.

=== Bayern Munich ===
Lewandowski returned to Germany following the WPS, this time with Bayern Munich. From 2012 to 2019, she appeared in 116 times for the club in regular season games, scoring 18 times. Along with Bayern she won the Frauen-Bundesliga two more times in 2015 and 2016.

=== NJ/NY Gotham FC ===
Lewandowski signed with NJ/NY Gotham FC, a National Women's Soccer League (NWSL) team based in New Jersey, 90 minutes from where she grew up, on May 7, 2019. In January 2020, she signed a new one-year contract.

On May 30, 2022, she announced her plans to retire in July 2022.

== Coaching career ==
On March 7, 2025, Lewandowski was announced as an assistant coach at Notre Dame.

== International career ==
May 9, 2012, Lewandowski called up for the United States match against China.

On October 25, 2015, at age 30, Lewandowski earned her only cap for the United States in an international friendly (Victory Tour) match against Brazil, coming off the bench in the 74th minute to play left wingback.

== Honors and awards ==
=== Club ===
1. FFC Frankfurt

- UEFA Women's Cup (1): Winner 2007–08
- German Cup (2): Winner 2007–08, 2010–11
- Bundesliga (1): Winner 2007–08

Bayern Munich

- Bundesliga (2): Winner 2014–15, 2015–16

=== Individual ===
- 2003: Patriot League Rookie of the Year
- 2004: Patriot League Offensive Player of the Year
- 2005: Patriot League Offensive Player of the Year
