= Paige Nielsen =

American soccer player (born 1993)

- Nielsen with the Houston Dash in 2026

Personal information
- Full name: Paige Kathleen Nielsen
- Date of birth: October 14, 1993 (age 33)
- Place of birth: Lincoln, Nebraska, United States
- Height: 5 ft 5 in (1.65 m)
- Position: Center back

Team information
- Current team: Houston Dash
- Number: 14

College career
Years	Team	Apps	(Gls)
2012–2015	North Carolina Tar Heels	83	(13)

Senior career*
Years	Team	Apps	(Gls)
2016	Seattle Reign FC	2	(0)
2016	Apollon		
2016–2017	Western Sydney Wanderers	12	(1)
2017–2018	Suwon UDC	42	(13)
2018	Canberra United	5	(0)
2019–2021	Washington Spirit	38	(1)
2022–2024	Angel City	46	(2)
2024–	Houston Dash	70	(3)
- * Club domestic league appearances and goals as of 03:16, November 8, 2026 (UTC)

Paige Kathleen Nielsen (born October 14, 1993) is an American professional soccer player who plays as a center back for Houston Dash of the National Women's Soccer League (NWSL).

She previously played for the Washington Spirit, Seattle Reign FC, and Angel City FC in the NWSL, Canberra United and Western Sydney Wanderers in the Australian W-League, Suwon UDC in Korea's WK League, and Apollon in Cyprus's First Division.

== Early life ==
Born in Lincoln, Nebraska to Kathy Nielsen, Paige attended Lincoln Southeast High School where she was a four-year varsity soccer player. She was twice named a Nebraska Gatorade Player of the Year nominee in 2011 and 2012. She set new school records after ending her high school career with 79 goals and 35 assists. She was twice-named to All-State, All-Conference and All-City soccer teams.

Nielsen played club soccer for Toro Bravo soccer in Omaha, Nebraska and helped lead the team to three state championships, the Midwest Regional League championship in 2011, and National League Red Division championship in 2012. She played for the Nebraska Olympic Development (ODP) team from 2007 to 2010.

== College career ==
=== University of North Carolina ===
Nielsen attended the University of North Carolina, Chapel Hill from 2012 to 2015 where she played for the Tar Heels. During her freshman season, Nielsen played in 20 games for the Tar Heels, starting five. That same year, the team won the NCAA Division I Women's Soccer Championship for the 21st time. The following year, Nielsen ranked fourth on the team in goals scored. She finished her sophomore season with six goals and four assists. During her junior season in 2014, she played in 20 games, starting nine. Four of the five goals she scored were game-winning goals, which ranked first on the team in game-winning goals. Nielsen captained the Tar Heels during her senior season and finished her collegiate career with 13 goals and 7 assists playing as both a defender and forward.

== Club career ==
=== Seattle Reign FC, 2016 ===
In January 2016, Nielsen was selected as the 25th overall pick of the 2016 NWSL College Draft by the Seattle Reign, becoming the first Nebraskan native to be drafted by an NWSL team. She signed with the club in May of the same year. She made her debut for the club in a match against the Chicago Red Stars on May 22. The following week, she played the full ninety minutes in the forward position in a friendly against recent FA WSL champion Arsenal L.F.C. Nielsen was waived by the Reign in July 2016.

=== Western Sydney Wanderers, 2016–2017 ===
After short stint with Apollon in Cyprus, Nielsen signed with the Western Sydney Wanderers for the 2016-17 W-League season where she started all twelve games for the Wanderers.

=== Suwon UDC, 2017–2018 ===
After the conclusion of the W-League season, Nielsen signed with Suwon UDC in the WK League in South Korea.

=== Canberra United, 2018 ===
In November 2018, Nielsen signed with Canberra United in the W-League. She departed the club in December after making five appearances for the team.

=== Washington Spirit, 2019–2021 ===
In February 2019, Nielsen returned to the NWSL signing with the Washington Spirit.

=== Angel City FC, 2022–2024 ===
On December 16, 2021 Nielsen was selected by Angel City FC in the 2022 NWSL Expansion Draft and went on to make twenty appearances and sixteen starts in her first season with the club. The club finished their first season in eighth place with a 8–9–5 record. Nielsen signed a two-year contract extension in December 2022.

External videos
- Nielsen's equalizer goal against San Diego Wave, June 2023 retrieved March 23, 2024

During the 2023 season, Nielsen was a starting defender in all 21 games she played. She scored the equalizer goal in the club's 2-1 win against Southern California rivals San Diego Wave FC on June 17. Angel City finished in fifth place during the regular season and advanced to the playoffs for the first time where they were eliminated by Seattle Reign FC in the quarter final match.

=== Houston Dash, 2024– ===
On April 20, 2024, Angel City FC announced that Nielsen had been traded to the Houston Dash in exchange for $50,000 in allocation and $50,000 in transfer funds. She scored a 98th-minute goal to beat her former team, Angel City, 1–0 on May 12.

== Personal life ==
Nielsen has said that she plays for her mother, Kathy, who lost her life to Hodgkin lymphoma when Nielsen was a senior in college. She married Jennifer Riservato on January 22, 2022.

Nielsen had emergency surgery for a blood clotting condition in 2022.

=== Television and film ===
Nielsen was featured the documentary series Angel City in 2023. In 2024, she appeared in the first season of The Offseason, a reality television series following a group of NWSL players training before the new season.

== See also ==
- List of University of North Carolina at Chapel Hill alumni
- List of foreign A-League Women players
- List of OL Reign players
- List of Washington Spirit players
