= List of National Women's Soccer League draftees by college team =

The following is a list of National Women's Soccer League (NWSL) draftees by college soccer team.

Composed of four rounds, the NWSL Draft was a mechanism by which NWSL franchises are able to select college athletes from the NCAA and the NAIA who are in their senior season in college or have exhausted their collegiate eligibility. In total, 12 NWSL college drafts were held from the 2013 NWSL College Draft until the final 2024 NWSL Draft. In August 2024, the draft was abolished as part of the new Collective Bargaining Agreement. The NWSL became the first major professional sports league in the United States to eliminate the draft system.

In total there were 490 players from 101 different schools (100 colleges and one high school) selected in the NWSL College Draft. The North Carolina Tar Heels hold the all-time record for most players drafted with 27 players. 26 schools have had only one player selected. The most selections from one college team in a single draft is six, achieved three times: by the UCLA Bruins in 2015, Duke Blue Devils in 2018 and North Carolina Tar Heels in 2024. The Virginia Cavaliers and Stanford Cardinal remain the only teams to have players drafted in all 12 NWSL Drafts.

40 college teams have had at least one player drafted in the first round. Stanford Cardinal hold the all-time record for first-round picks with 12 in total. The most first-round picks from one college team in a single draft is three which has happened on six occasions: UCLA Bruins in 2015, Florida State Seminoles in both 2016 and 2023, USC Trojans in 2017, Stanford Cardinal in 2019 and North Carolina Tar Heels in 2024. Five colleges have produced first overall picks: Stanford Cardinal (4), North Carolina Tar Heels (3), Virginia Cavaliers (2), UCLA Bruins (1), and Wisconsin Badgers (1). In 2023, Alyssa Thompson became the first high school player selected in an NWSL Draft when she was taken first overall out of Harvard-Westlake School (1).

== Alabama Crimson Tide ==
All-time Alabama Crimson Tide NWSL Draft picks
Draft	Round	Pick	Nat.	Player	Pos.	NWSL team
2018	4	36	(Spain)	Celia Jiménez	DF	Seattle Reign FC
2023	1	5	(Mexico)	Reyna Reyes	DF	Portland Thorns FC
2023	3	30	(Panama)	Riley Tanner	FW	Washington Spirit
2023	3	31	(United States)	Riley Mattingly Parker	FW	Racing Louisville FC
2024	3	37	(United States)	Felicia Knox	MF	Angel City FC

== Arizona Wildcats ==
All-time Arizona Wildcats NWSL Draft picks
Draft	Round	Pick	Nat.	Player	Pos.	NWSL team
2023	4	44	(United States)	Iliana Hocking	MF	NJ/NY Gotham FC
2024	4	46	(United States)	Hope Hisey	GK	Kansas City Current

== Arizona State Sun Devils ==
All-time Arizona State Sun Devils NWSL Draft picks
Draft	Round	Pick	Nat.	Player	Pos.	NWSL team
2016	2	12	(United States)	Cali Farquharson	FW	Washington Spirit
2016	3	21	(United States)	McKenzie Berryhill	DF	Portland Thorns FC
2022	4	49	(Jamaica)	Jayda Hylton-Pelaia	DF	Chicago Red Stars
2023	3	26	(England)	Nicole Douglas	FW	Washington Spirit

== Arkansas Razorbacks ==
All-time Arkansas Razorbacks NWSL Draft picks
Draft	Round	Pick	Nat.	Player	Pos.	NWSL team
2016	4	39	(United States)	Ashleigh Ellenwood	FW	Chicago Red Stars
2021	3	21	(United States)	Parker Goins	FW	Racing Louisville FC
2022	3	37	(United States)	Kayla McKeon	MF	Chicago Red Stars
2024	3	35	(United States)	Anna Podojil	FW	Washington Spirit
2024	3	41	(United States)	Bea Franklin	MF	Chicago Red Stars

== Auburn Tigers ==
All-time Auburn Tigers NWSL Draft picks
Draft	Round	Pick	Nat.	Player	Pos.	NWSL team
2020	4	36	(United States)	Bri Folds	MF	North Carolina Courage
2021	2	20	(United States)	Alyssa Malonson	DF	North Carolina Courage

== Baylor Bears ==
All-time Baylor Bears NWSL Draft picks
Draft	Round	Pick	Nat.	Player	Pos.	NWSL team
2019	2	11	(United States)	Julie James	MF	Sky Blue FC

== Boston College Eagles ==
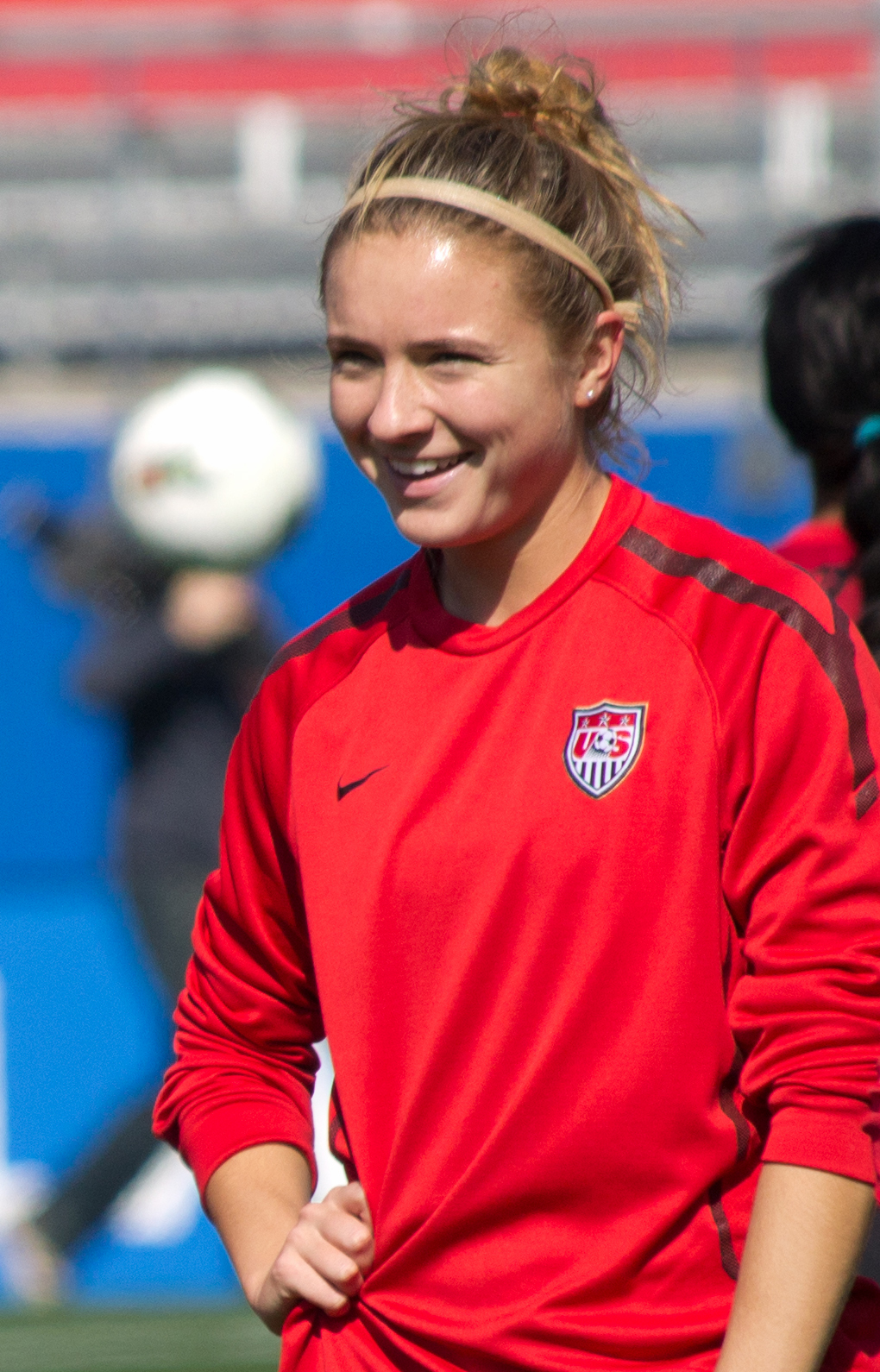
Boston College's Kristie Mewis has scored for a joint-record five different NWSL teams.

All-time Boston College Eagles NWSL Draft picks
Draft	Round	Pick	Nat.	Player	Pos.	NWSL team
2013	1	3	(United States)	Kristie Mewis	MF	FC Kansas City
2013	3	22	(United States)	Vicki DiMartino	FW	Western New York Flash
2015	1	5	(United States)	Stephanie McCaffrey	FW	Chicago Red Stars
2017	4	34	(United States)	McKenzie Meehan	FW	Sky Blue FC
2017	4	38	(United States)	Hayley Dowd	FW	Boston Breakers

== Boston University Terriers ==
All-time Boston University Terriers NWSL Draft picks
Draft	Round	Pick	Nat.	Player	Pos.	NWSL team
2021	2	19	(United States)	Anna Heilferty	FW	Washington Spirit

== Bowling Green Falcons ==
All-time Bowling Green Falcons NWSL Draft picks
Draft	Round	Pick	Nat.	Player	Pos.	NWSL team
2020	4	30	(United States)	Chelsee Washington	MF	Orlando Pride

== Butler Bulldogs ==
All-time Butler Bulldogs NWSL Draft picks
Draft	Round	Pick	Nat.	Player	Pos.	NWSL team
2019	2	10	(United States)	Paige Monaghan	FW	Sky Blue FC

== BYU Cougars ==
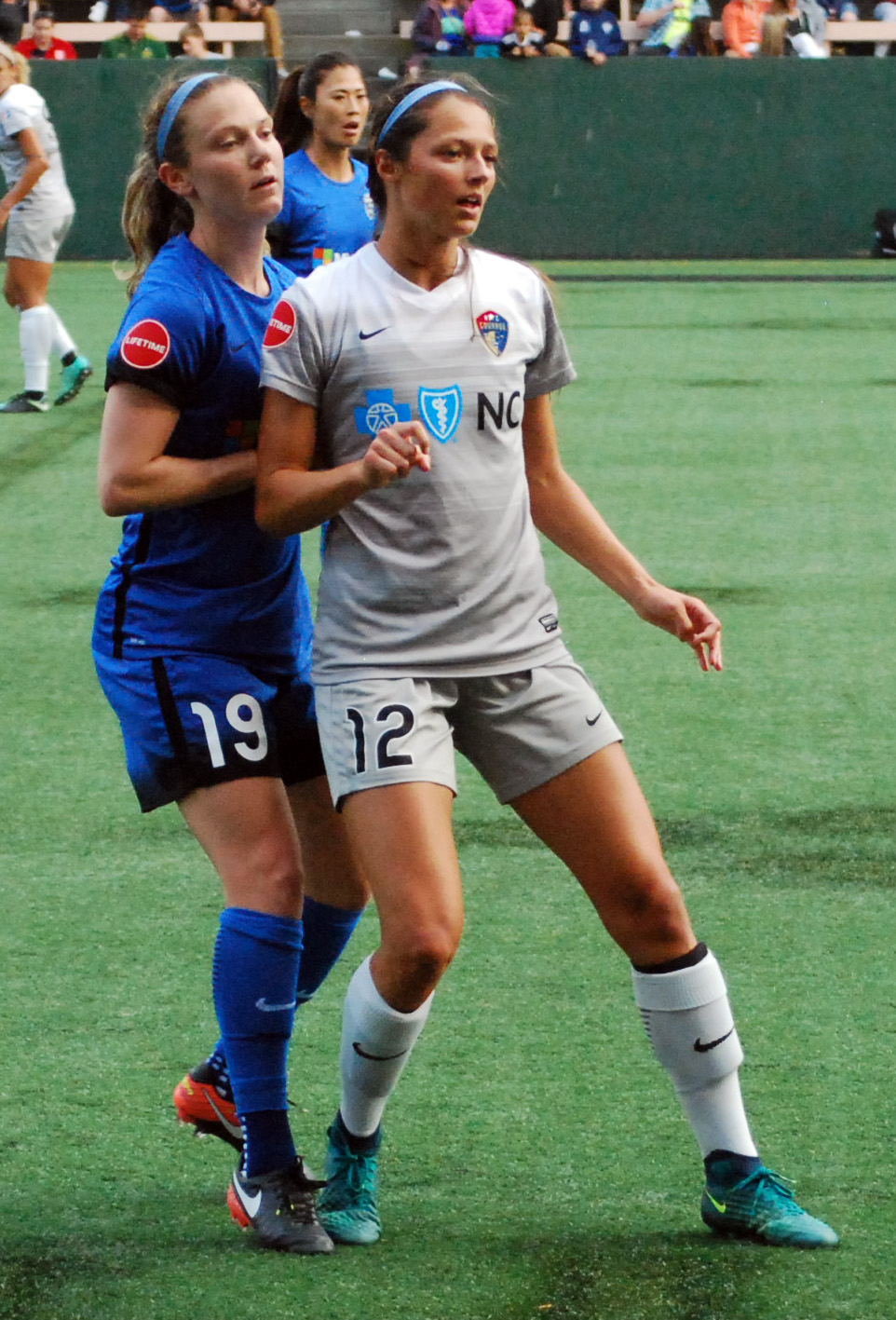
BYU's Ashley Hatch (right) was named 2017 NWSL Rookie of the Year and won the Golden Boot in 2021.

All-time BYU Cougars NWSL Draft picks
Draft	Round	Pick	Nat.	Player	Pos.	NWSL team
2013	1	4	(United States)	Lindsi Lisonbee Cutshall	DF	Sky Blue FC
2014	2	14	(United States)	Cloee Colohan	MF	Western New York Flash
2017	1	2	(United States)	Ashley Hatch	FW	North Carolina Courage
2017	2	11	(United States)	Michele Vasconcelos	FW	Chicago Red Stars
2018	2	14	(United States)	Taylor Isom	DF	Utah Royals FC
2018	3	23	(Portugal)	Nádia Gomes	FW	Orlando Pride
2021	2	14	(United States)	Mikayla Colohan	MF	Orlando Pride
2024	1	4	(United States)	Brecken Mozingo	FW	Utah Royals
2024	2	20	(United States)	Olivia Smith-Griffitts	DF	Utah Royals
2024	2	23	(United States)	Olivia Wade-Katoa	MF	Portland Thorns FC
2024	3	30	(United States)	Jamie Shepherd	MF	Bay FC
2024	4	55	(Tonga)	Laveni Vaka	DF	Bay FC

== Cal State Fullerton Titans ==
All-time Cal State Fullerton Titans NWSL Draft picks
Draft	Round	Pick	Nat.	Player	Pos.	NWSL team
2016	2	15	(Mexico)	Christina Burkenroad	FW	Orlando Pride

== California Golden Bears ==
All-time California Golden Bears NWSL Draft picks
Draft	Round	Pick	Nat.	Player	Pos.	NWSL team
2016	1	10	(United States)	Sam Witteman	DF	Orlando Pride
2017	1	8	(Nigeria)	Ifeoma Onumonu	FW	Boston Breakers
2017	3	26	(United States)	Arielle Ship	FW	Seattle Reign FC
2018	2	15	(United States)	Emily Boyd	GK	Chicago Red Stars
2018	2	18	(United States)	Indigo Gibson	DF	Chicago Red Stars
2020	3	26	(Ghana)	Abi Kim	FW	Orlando Pride
2021	4	31	(United States)	Emily Smith	DF	Racing Louisville FC
2023	1	8	(Canada)	Sydney Collins	DF	North Carolina Courage
2023	3	27	(United States)	Angelina Anderson	GK	Angel City FC

== Clemson Tigers ==
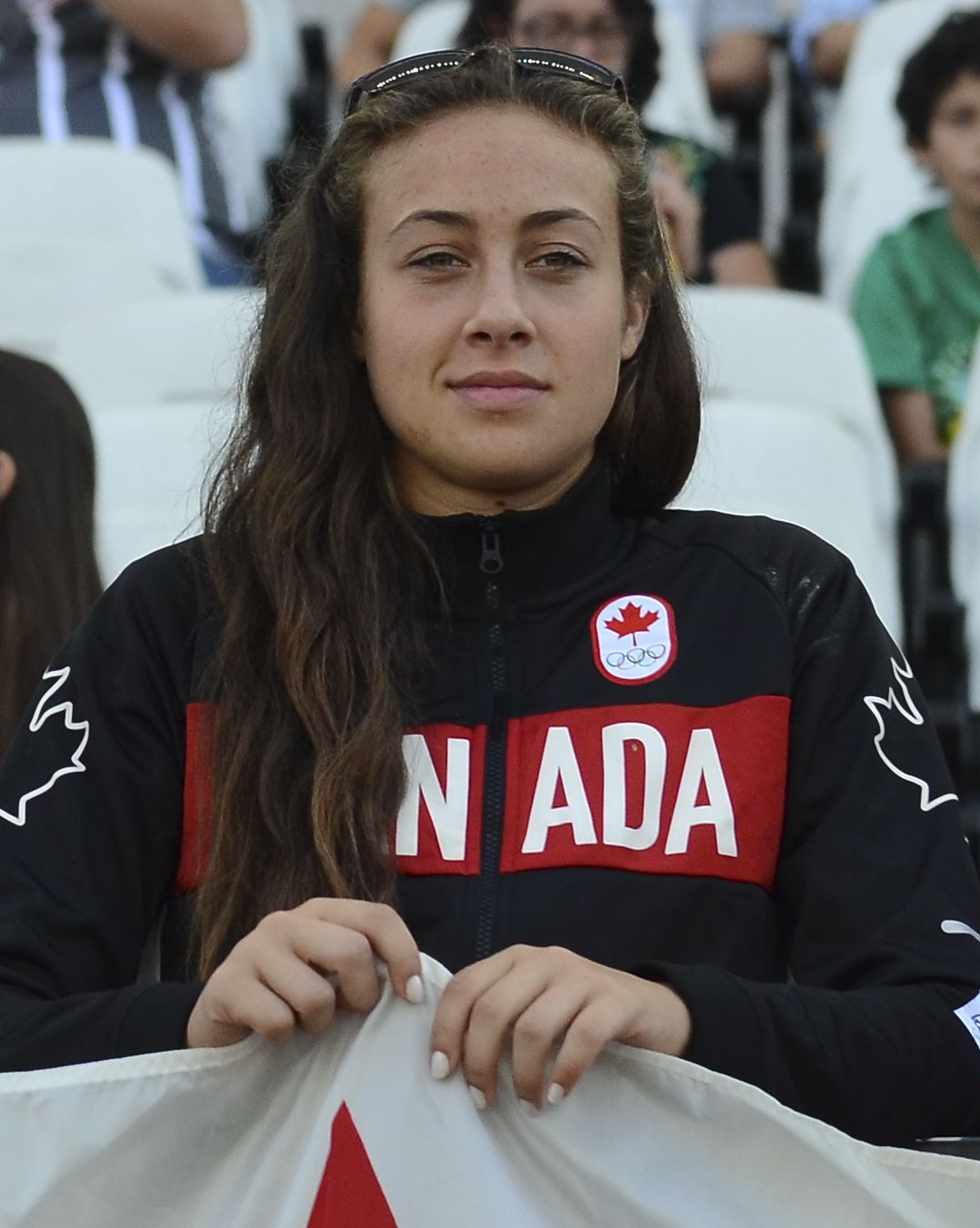
Clemson's Kailen Sheridan was named to the NWSL Best XI in 2021.

All-time Clemson Tigers NWSL Draft picks
Draft	Round	Pick	Nat.	Player	Pos.	NWSL team
2017	2	20	(United States)	Claire Wagner	DF	North Carolina Courage
2017	3	23	(Canada)	Kailen Sheridan	GK	Sky Blue FC
2017	3	30	(United States)	Catrina Atanda	MF	Sky Blue FC
2019	1	4	(United States)	Sam Staab	DF	Washington Spirit
2021	4	39	(Venezuela)	Mariana Speckmaier	FW	Washington Spirit
2022	3	34	(United States)	Hensley Hancuff	GK	NJ/NY Gotham FC
2024	1	5	(United States)	Hal Hershfelt	MF	Washington Spirit
2024	1	13	(United States)	Makenna Morris	DF	Washington Spirit
2024	3	32	(United States)	Halle Mackiewicz	GK	Kansas City Current
2024	3	34	(United States)	Caroline Conti	MF	Bay FC

== Colorado Buffaloes ==
All-time Colorado Buffaloes NWSL Draft picks
Draft	Round	Pick	Nat.	Player	Pos.	NWSL team
2013	2	14	(United States)	Amy Barczuk	MF	Western New York Flash
2017	3	22	(United States)	Danica Evans	FW	Orlando Pride
2018	2	20	(United States)	Rebecca Rasmussen	MF	North Carolina Courage
2019	3	25	(United States)	Erin Greening	MF	Orlando Pride
2020	1	3	(United States)	Taylor Kornieck	MF	Orlando Pride
2023	4	37	(United States)	Civana Kuhlmann	FW	Washington Spirit

== Colorado College Tigers ==
All-time Colorado College Tigers NWSL Draft picks
Draft	Round	Pick	Nat.	Player	Pos.	NWSL team
2015	3	26	(United States)	Jessica Ayers	MF	FC Kansas City
2019	2	14	(United States)	Lauren Milliet	MF	North Carolina Courage

== Dayton Flyers ==
All-time Dayton Flyers NWSL Draft picks
Draft	Round	Pick	Nat.	Player	Pos.	NWSL team
2013	4	26	(United States)	Colleen Williams	MF	Washington Spirit

== Denver Pioneers ==
All-time Denver Pioneers NWSL Draft picks
Draft	Round	Pick	Nat.	Player	Pos.	NWSL team
2014	4	36	(United States)	Kristen Hamilton	FW	Western New York Flash
2020	3	21	(United States)	Cheyenne Shorts	DF	Orlando Pride
2022	4	48	(United States)	Natalie Beckman	FW	Portland Thorns FC

== DePaul Blue Demons ==
All-time DePaul Blue Demons NWSL Draft picks
Draft	Round	Pick	Nat.	Player	Pos.	NWSL team
2016	3	22	(United States)	Sarah Gorden	DF	Chicago Red Stars
2018	4	37	(United States)	Alexa Ben	MF	Chicago Red Stars

== Duke Blue Devils ==
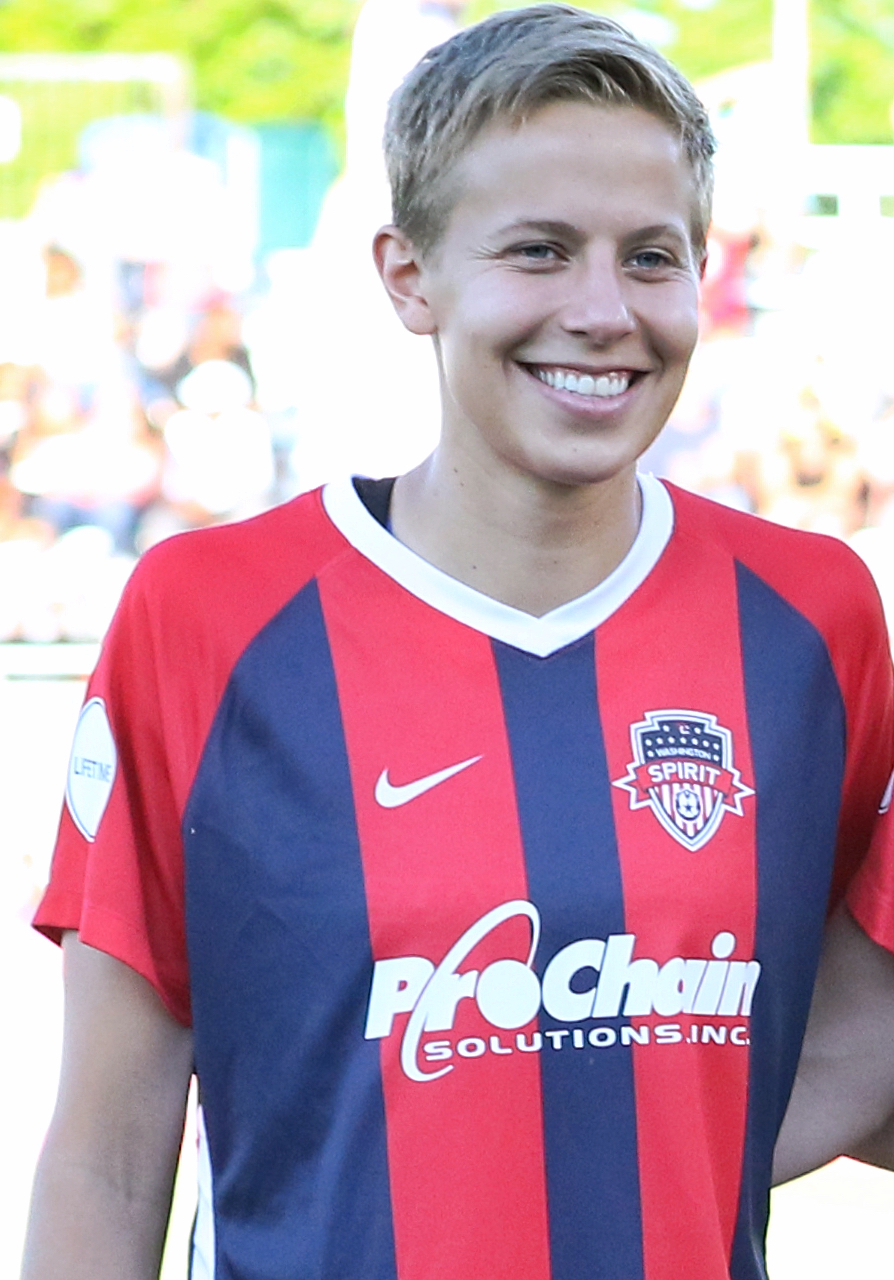
Quinn was the first of a record-equalling six Duke players selected in the 2018 NWSL Draft.

All-time Duke Blue Devils NWSL Draft picks
Draft	Round	Pick	Nat.	Player	Pos.	NWSL team
2014	2	13	(Iceland)	Natasha Anasi	DF	Boston Breakers
2014	3	23	(United States)	Mollie Pathman	MF	Boston Breakers
2014	4	34	(United States)	Kim DeCesare	FW	Boston Breakers
2016	4	37	(United States)	Kara Marie Wilson	DF	Washington Spirit
2017	1	5	(United States)	Christina Gibbons	MF	FC Kansas City
2017	2	13	(Nigeria)	Toni Payne	FW	FC Kansas City
2018	1	3	(Canada)	Quinn (Note: Known at the time of the draft as Rebecca Quinn)	MF	Washington Spirit
2018	1	5	(United States)	Imani Dorsey	FW	Sky Blue FC
2018	2	11	(United States)	Schuyler DeBree	DF	Washington Spirit
2018	3	22	(United States)	Ashton Miller	MF	Boston Breakers
2018	4	34	(United States)	Emma Jane Proctor	GK	Utah Royals FC
2018	4	38	(United States)	Morgan Reid	DF	North Carolina Courage
2019	2	18	(Jamaica)	Kayla McCoy	FW	Houston Dash
2020	3	24	(United States)	Ella Stevens	FW	Chicago Red Stars
2021	4	40	(United States)	Tess Boade	FW	Sky Blue FC
2022	1	10	(United States)	Caitlin Cosme	DF	Orlando Pride
2022	3	36	(United States)	Lily Nabet	MF	Angel City FC
2023	1	2	(United States)	Michelle Cooper	FW	Kansas City Current
2023	4	40	(United States)	Delaney Graham	DF	Washington Spirit
2023	4	43	(United States)	Sophie Jones	MF	Chicago Red Stars

== Florida Gators ==
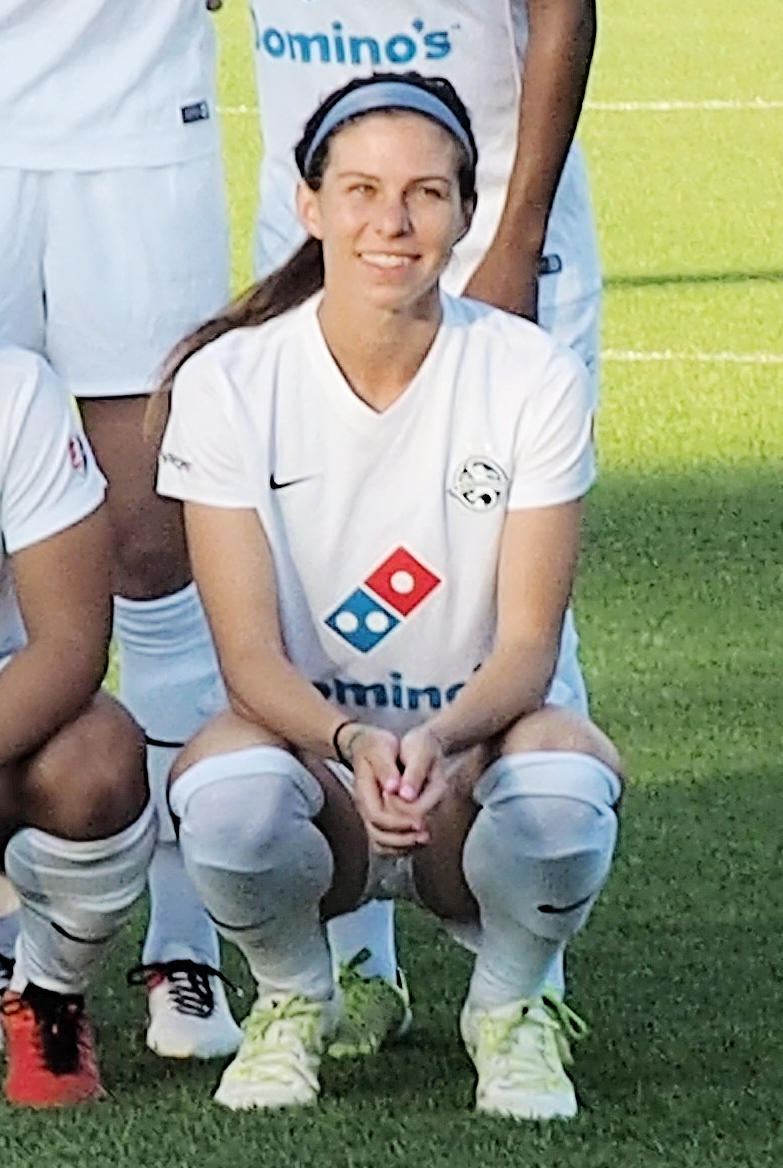
Florida's Erika Tymrak was named NWSL Rookie of the Year in the inaugural season.

All-time Florida Gators NWSL Draft picks
Draft	Round	Pick	Nat.	Player	Pos.	NWSL team
2013	1	8	(United States)	Kat Williamson	DF	Portland Thorns FC
2013	2	11	(United States)	Erika Tymrak	MF	FC Kansas City
2013	3	18	(United States)	Holly King	MF	Washington Spirit
2013	3	21	(United States)	Jo Dragotta	MF	Boston Breakers
2015	2	15	(Jamaica)	Havana Solaun	MF	Seattle Reign FC
2016	1	3	(United States)	Christen Westphal	DF	Boston Breakers
2017	2	18	(United States)	Savannah Jordan	FW	Portland Thorns FC
2017	3	29	(United States)	Meggie Dougherty Howard	MF	Washington Spirit
2018	1	9	(United States)	Gabby Seiler	MF	Portland Thorns FC
2019	4	28	(United States)	Kaylan Marckese	GK	Sky Blue FC
2021	1	10	(Canada)	Deanne Rose	FW	North Carolina Courage

== Florida State Seminoles ==
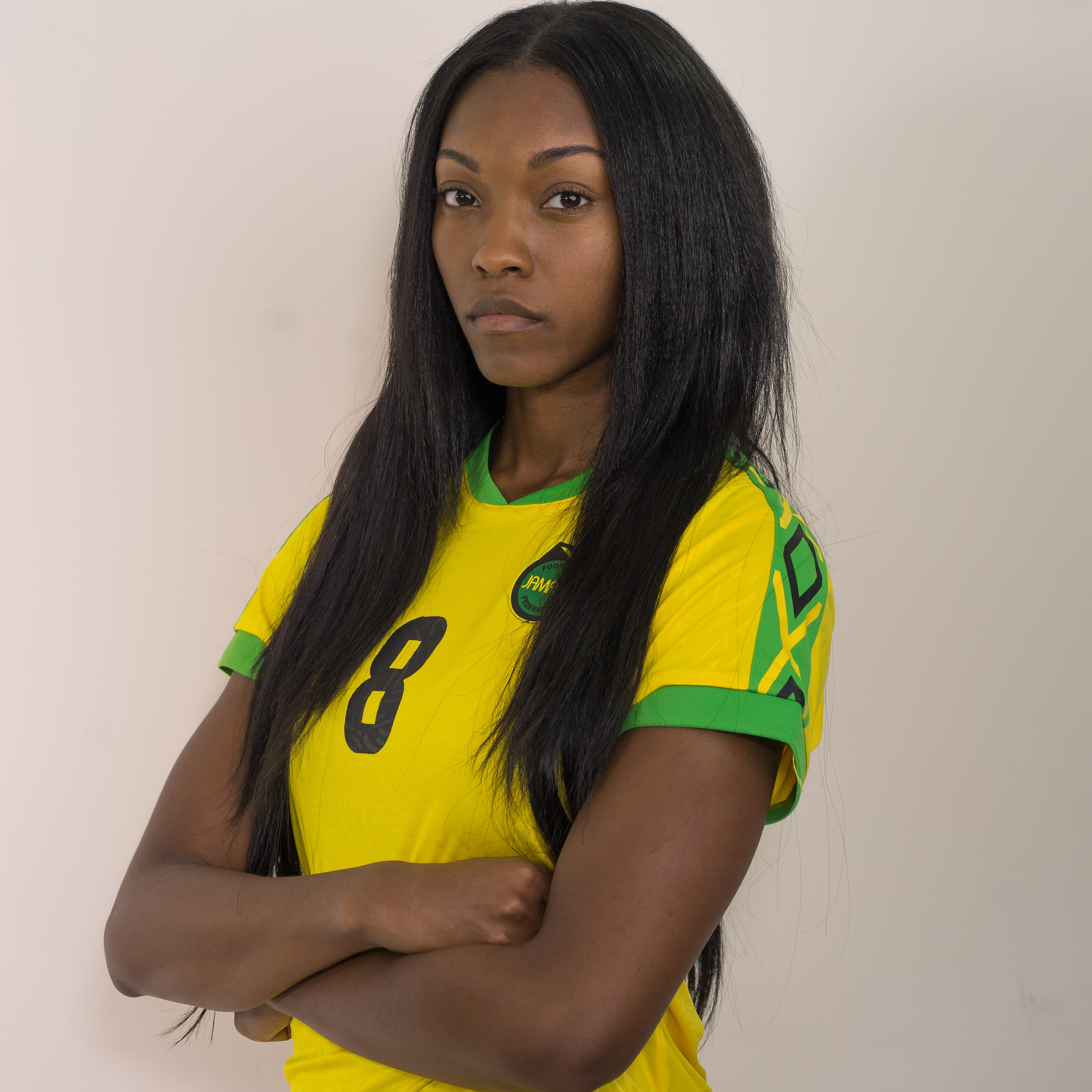
Cheyna Williams was one of a record-equalling three first-round draft picks for FSU in 2016.

All-time Florida State Seminoles NWSL Draft picks
Draft	Round	Pick	Nat.	Player	Pos.	NWSL team
2013	1	2	(United States)	Tiffany McCarty	FW	Washington Spirit
2013	1	5	(United States)	Casey Short	DF	Boston Breakers
2013	3	17	(United States)	Taylor Vancil	GK	Chicago Red Stars
2014	1	5	(United States)	Kassey Kallman	DF	FC Kansas City
2014	2	18	(United States)	Kelsey Wys	GK	Western New York Flash
2015	2	10	(United States)	Kristin Grubka	DF	Sky Blue FC
2015	2	14	(United States)	Jamia Fields	FW	Boston Breakers
2016	1	4	(United States)	Carson Pickett	DF	Seattle Reign FC
2016	1	7	(Jamaica)	Cheyna Williams	FW	Washington Spirit
2016	1	9	(United States)	Michaela Hahn	MF	Western New York Flash
2019	4	36	(United States)	Kaycie Tillman	MF	North Carolina Courage
2022	1	2	(United States)	Jaelin Howell	MF	Racing Louisville FC
2023	1	3	(United States)	Emily Madril	DF	Orlando Pride
2023	1	4	(United States)	Jenna Nighswonger	MF	NJ/NY Gotham FC
2023	1	9	(United States)	Clara Robbins	MF	North Carolina Courage
2024	1	10	(Bermuda)	Leilanni Nesbeth	MF	Chicago Red Stars
2024	2	16	(United States)	Lauren Flynn	DF	Utah Royals
2024	3	33	(Puerto Rico)	Cristina Roque	GK	Utah Royals

== Georgetown Hoyas ==
All-time Georgetown Hoyas NWSL Draft picks
Draft	Round	Pick	Nat.	Player	Pos.	NWSL team
2014	3	25	(United States)	Emily Menges	DF	Portland Thorns FC
2015	3	22	(France)	Daphné Corboz	MF	Sky Blue FC
2018	2	17	(United States)	Elizabeth Wenger	DF	Boston Breakers
2019	3	19	(Republic of Ireland)	Kyra Carusa	FW	Sky Blue FC
2020	3	25	(United States)	Meaghan Nally	DF	Portland Thorns FC
2022	2	24	(United States)	Kelly Ann Livingstone	DF	NJ/NY Gotham FC
2022	4	42	(Guyana)	Sydney Cummings	DF	Racing Louisville FC

== Georgia Bulldogs ==
All-time Georgia Bulldogs NWSL Draft picks
Draft	Round	Pick	Nat.	Player	Pos.	NWSL team
2013	3	20	(England)	Ashley Baker	GK	Sky Blue FC
2022	4	40	(United States)	Kayla Bruster	DF	San Diego Wave FC
2024	1	3	(United States)	Croix Bethune	MF	Washington Spirit

== Gonzaga Bulldogs ==
All-time Gonzaga Bulldogs NWSL Draft picks
Draft	Round	Pick	Nat.	Player	Pos.	NWSL team
2022	4	50	(United States)	Jordan Thompson	DF	Washington Spirit
2023	3	28	(United States)	Lyza Bosselmann	GK	Washington Spirit

== Grand Canyon Antelopes ==
All-time Grand Canyon Antelopes NWSL Draft picks
Draft	Round	Pick	Nat.	Player	Pos.	NWSL team
2022	1	9	(Germany)	Marleen Schimmer	FW	San Diego Wave FC

== Harvard Crimson ==
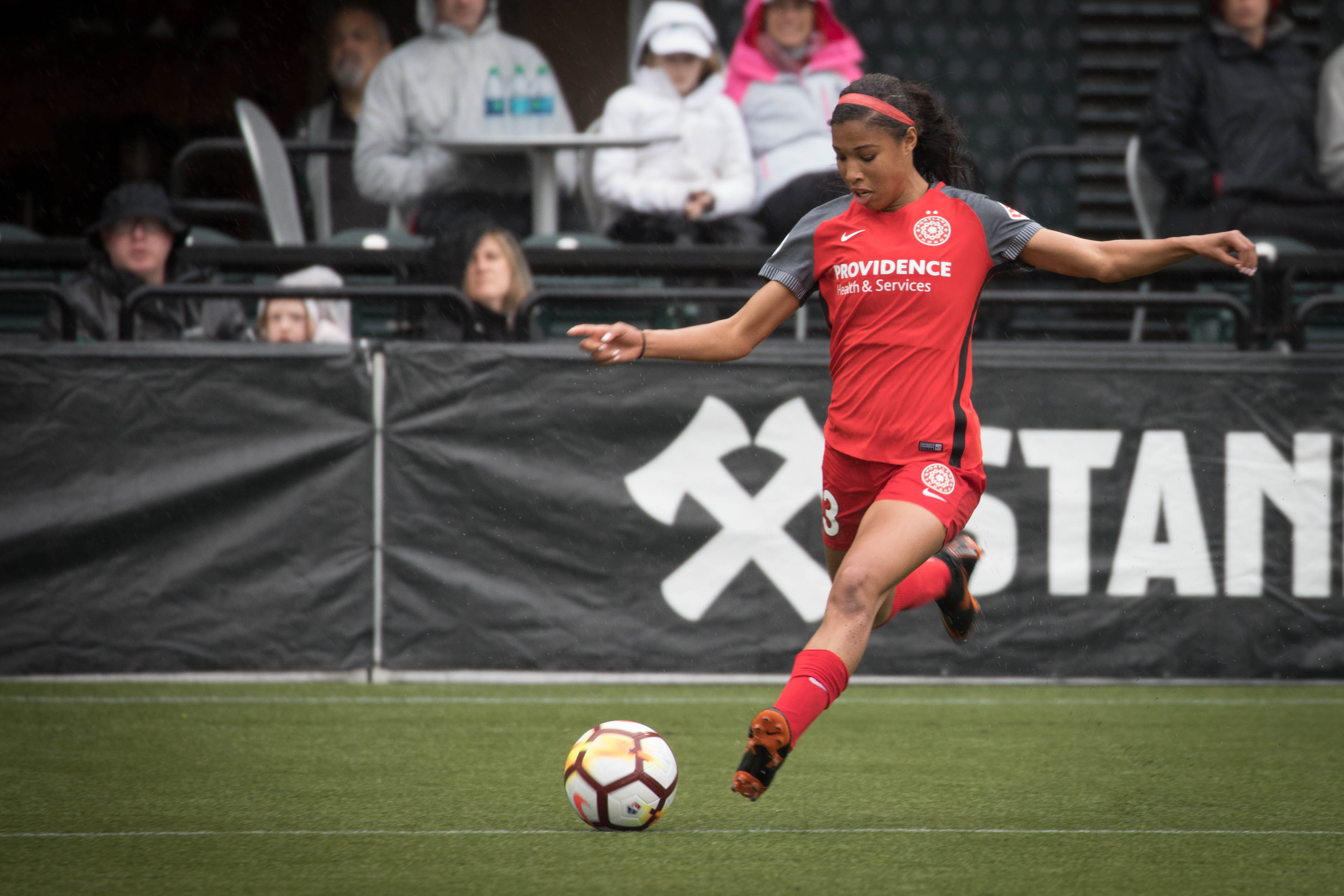
In 2017, Margaret Purce became the first Harvard player to be selected in an NWSL Draft..

All-time Harvard Crimson NWSL Draft picks
Draft	Round	Pick	Nat.	Player	Pos.	NWSL team
2017	1	9	(United States)	Midge Purce	FW	Boston Breakers
2023	2	20	(United States)	Sophie Hirst	MF	Houston Dash

== Hofstra Pride ==
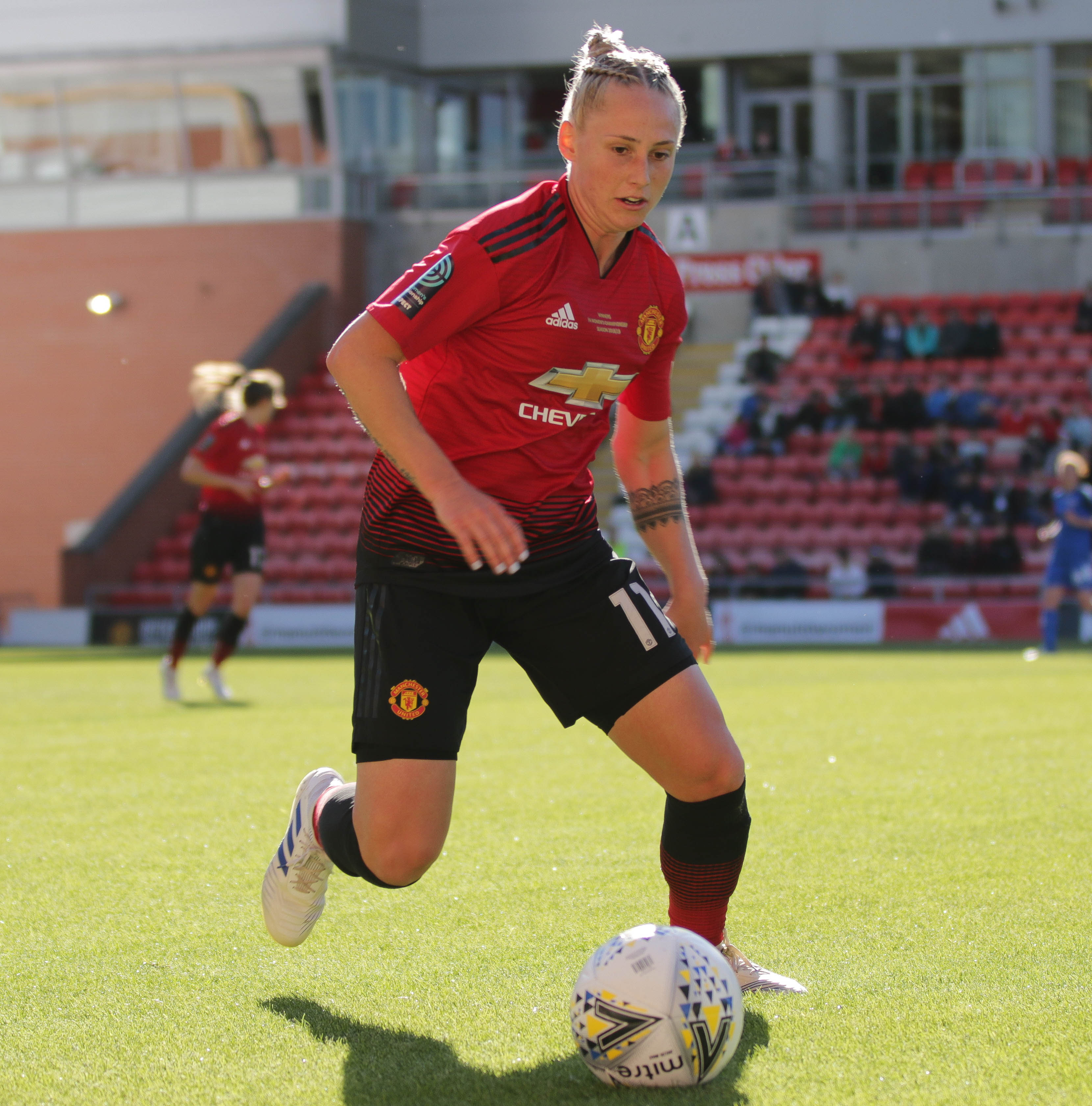
In 2016, Leah Galton became the first Hofstra player to be selected in an NWSL Draft.

All-time Hofstra Pride NWSL Draft picks
Draft	Round	Pick	Nat.	Player	Pos.	NWSL team
2016	2	13	(England)	Leah Galton	FW	Sky Blue FC
2022	2	23	(England)	Lucy Shepherd	FW	Washington Spirit
2022	4	39	(England)	Miri Taylor	FW	Angel City FC

== Illinois Fighting Illini ==
All-time Illinois Fighting Illini NWSL Draft picks
Draft	Round	Pick	Nat.	Player	Pos.	NWSL team
2014	1	4	(United States)	Vanessa DiBernardo	MF	Chicago Red Stars
2016	4	33	(United States)	Jannelle Flaws	FW	Chicago Red Stars
2022	3	28	(United States)	Hope Breslin	MF	Angel City FC

== Illinois State Redbirds ==
All-time Illinois State Redbirds NWSL Draft picks
Draft	Round	Pick	Nat.	Player	Pos.	NWSL team
2015	4	32	(United States)	Rachel Tejada	FW	Chicago Red Stars
2020	2	12	(United States)	Kate Del Fava	MF	Utah Royals FC

== Iowa Hawkeyes ==
All-time Iowa Hawkeyes NWSL Draft picks
Draft	Round	Pick	Nat.	Player	Pos.	NWSL team
2024	4	48	(United States)	Samantha Cary	DF	Racing Louisville FC

== Iowa State Cyclones ==
All-time Iowa State Cyclones NWSL Draft picks
Draft	Round	Pick	Nat.	Player	Pos.	NWSL team
2023	2	18	(United States)	Jordan Silkowitz	GK	Kansas City Current

== James Madison Dukes ==
All-time James Madison Dukes NWSL Draft picks
Draft	Round	Pick	Nat.	Player	Pos.	NWSL team
2015	3	20	(United States)	Sam Lofton	DF	Boston Breakers

== Kansas Jayhawks ==
All-time Kansas Jayhawks NWSL Draft picks
Draft	Round	Pick	Nat.	Player	Pos.	NWSL team
2013	3	19	(United States)	Whitney Berry	MF	FC Kansas City
2020	3	23	(United States)	Katie McClure	FW	Washington Spirit
2020	4	28	(United States)	Addisyn Merrick	DF	North Carolina Courage
2023	4	42	(United States)	Rylan Childers	MF	Kansas City Current

== Kansas State Wildcats ==
All-time Kansas State Wildcats NWSL Draft picks
Draft	Round	Pick	Nat.	Player	Pos.	NWSL team
2021	4	38	(United States)	Brookelynn Entz	MF	Kansas City NWSL

== Kentucky Wildcats ==
All-time Kentucky Wildcats NWSL Draft picks
Draft	Round	Pick	Nat.	Player	Pos.	NWSL team
2015	1	8	(United States)	Arin Gilliland	DF	Chicago Red Stars
2016	4	32	(United States)	Courtney Raetzman	MF	Chicago Red Stars

== Long Beach State Beach ==
All-time Long Beach State Beach NWSL Draft picks
Draft	Round	Pick	Nat.	Player	Pos.	NWSL team
2022	1	12	(United States)	Kaitlin Fregulia	DF	North Carolina Courage
2023	3	34	(United States)	Lena Silano	FW	Washington Spirit

== Louisville Cardinals ==
All-time Louisville Cardinals NWSL Draft picks
Draft	Round	Pick	Nat.	Player	Pos.	NWSL team
2021	1	5	(Bosnia and Herzegovina)	Emina Ekić	MF	Racing Louisville FC

== Loyola Ramblers ==
All-time Loyola Ramblers NWSL Draft picks
Draft	Round	Pick	Nat.	Player	Pos.	NWSL team
2019	4	35	(United States)	Jenna Szczesny	FW	Chicago Red Stars

== LSU Tigers ==
All-time LSU Tigers NWSL Draft picks
Draft	Round	Pick	Nat.	Player	Pos.	NWSL team
2016	4	38	(United States)	Alex Arlitt	DF	FC Kansas City
2022	2	14	(England)	Tinaya Alexander	FW	Washington Spirit
2023	3	36	(United States)	Lindsi Jennings	DF	Houston Dash

== Marquette Golden Eagles ==
All-time Marquette Golden Eagles NWSL Draft picks
Draft	Round	Pick	Nat.	Player	Pos.	NWSL team
2014	4	35	(Canada)	Maegan Kelly	FW	FC Kansas City
2017	2	12	(United States)	Morgan Proffitt	MF	Chicago Red Stars

== Maryland Terrapins ==
All-time Maryland Terrapins NWSL Draft picks
Draft	Round	Pick	Nat.	Player	Pos.	NWSL team
2013	4	28	(United States)	Becky Kaplan	FW	Sky Blue FC
2014	3	22	(United States)	Hayley Brock	FW	Chicago Red Stars
2015	3	25	(United States)	Shade Pratt	DF	Sky Blue FC

== Memphis Tigers ==
All-time Memphis Tigers NWSL Draft picks
Draft	Round	Pick	Nat.	Player	Pos.	NWSL team
2024	3	42	(Canada)	Mya Jones	FW	San Diego Wave FC

== Michigan Wolverines ==
All-time Michigan Wolverines NWSL Draft picks
Draft	Round	Pick	Nat.	Player	Pos.	NWSL team
2013	4	31	(United States)	Haley Kopmeyer	GK	Seattle Reign FC
2014	1	8	(Canada)	Nkem Ezurike	FW	Boston Breakers
2022	4	46	(Argentina)	Raleigh Loughman	MF	NJ/NY Gotham FC

== Michigan State Spartans ==
All-time Michigan State Spartans NWSL Draft picks
Draft	Round	Pick	Nat.	Player	Pos.	NWSL team
2022	2	18	(United States)	Ava Cook	FW	Chicago Red Stars
2023	2	24	(United States)	Lauren DeBeau	FW	Portland Thorns FC
2023	3	32	(United States)	Lauren Kozal	GK	Portland Thorns FC
2024	4	45	(United States)	Celia Gaynor	MF	Chicago Red Stars

== Minnesota Golden Gophers ==
All-time Minnesota Golden Gophers NWSL Draft picks
Draft	Round	Pick	Nat.	Player	Pos.	NWSL team
2017	4	35	(United States)	Rashida Beal	DF	FC Kansas City
2019	4	31	(United States)	April Bockin	FW	Chicago Red Stars

== Mississippi State Bulldogs ==
All-time Mississippi State Bulldogs NWSL Draft picks
Draft	Round	Pick	Nat.	Player	Pos.	NWSL team
2014	4	31	(United States)	Elisabeth Sullivan	FW	Portland Thorns FC
2018	2	16	(United States)	Mallory Eubanks	FW	Washington Spirit

== Missouri State Lady Bears ==
All-time Missouri State Lady Bears NWSL Draft picks
Draft	Round	Pick	Nat.	Player	Pos.	NWSL team
2013	4	27	(United States)	Nia Williams	DF	FC Kansas City

== Missouri Tigers ==
All-time Missouri Tigers NWSL Draft picks
Draft	Round	Pick	Nat.	Player	Pos.	NWSL team
2015	4	35	(United States)	Kaysie Clark	MF	FC Kansas City
2016	4	36	(Panama)	Candace Johnson	DF	Chicago Red Stars

== NC State Wolfpack ==
All-time NC State Wolfpack NWSL Draft picks
Draft	Round	Pick	Nat.	Player	Pos.	NWSL team
2020	1	8	(United States)	Tziarra King	FW	Utah Royals FC
2024	2	15	(United States)	Jameese Joseph	FW	Chicago Red Stars

== Nebraska Cornhuskers ==
All-time Nebraska Cornhuskers NWSL Draft picks
Draft	Round	Pick	Nat.	Player	Pos.	NWSL team
2014	4	28	(United States)	Jordan Jackson	MF	Houston Dash
2017	3	27	(United States)	Jaycie Johnson	FW	North Carolina Courage
2017	4	40	(United States)	Caroline Flynn	MF	Portland Thorns FC
2018	1	7	(United States)	Haley Hanson	MF	Houston Dash
2020	3	27	(United States)	Sinclaire Miramontez	DF	North Carolina Courage
2020	4	34	(United States)	Meg Brandt	MF	Reign FC

== New Mexico Lobos ==
All-time New Mexico Lobos NWSL Draft picks
Draft	Round	Pick	Nat.	Player	Pos.	NWSL team
2023	3	29	(United States)	Jadyn Edwards	MF	Racing Louisville FC

== North Carolina Tar Heels ==
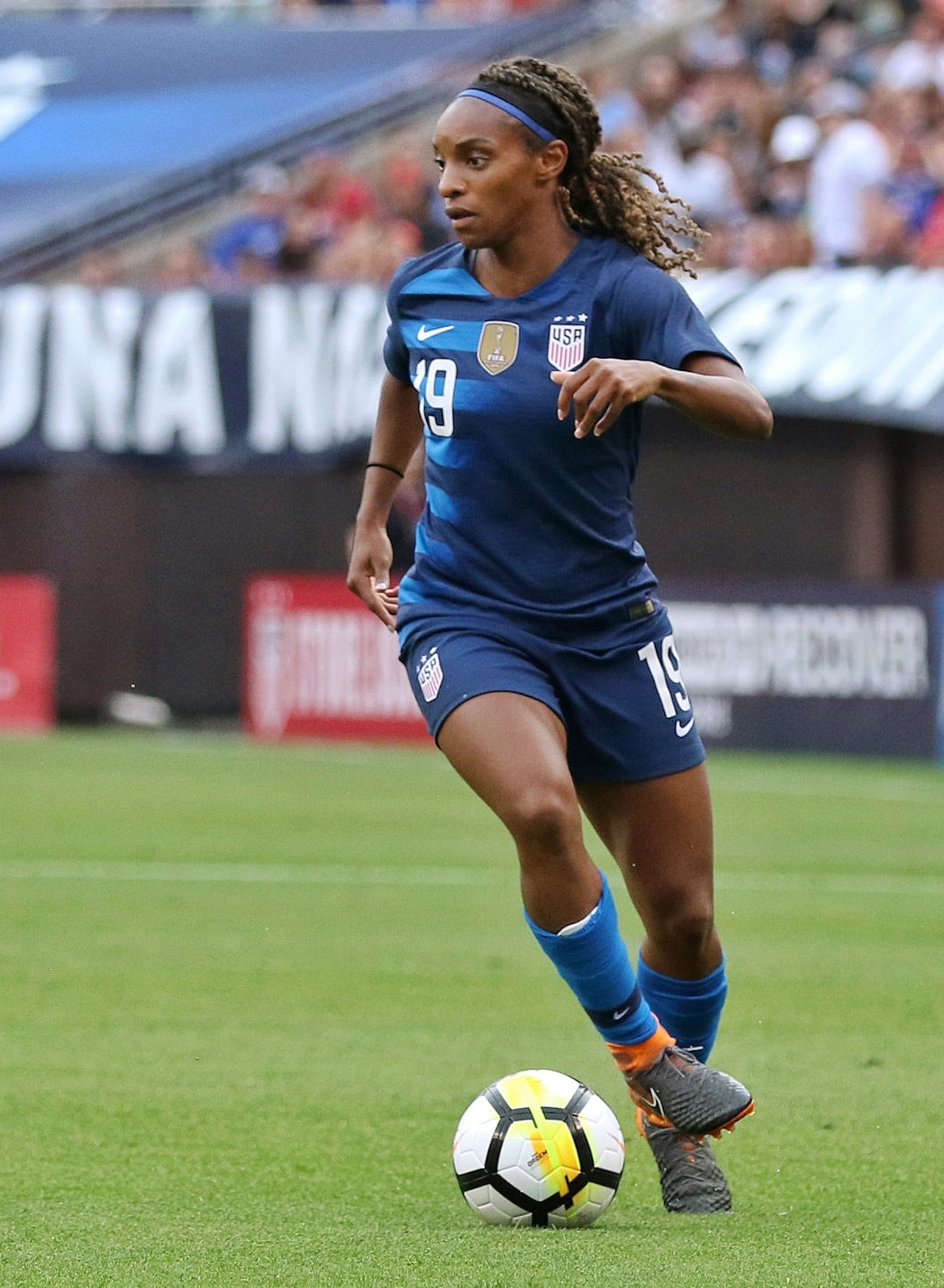
Crystal Dunn was the first of three North Carolina Tar Heels to be selected first overall. She was named NWSL MVP in 2015.

All-time North Carolina Tar Heels NWSL Draft picks
Draft	Round	Pick	Nat.	Player	Pos.	NWSL team
2013	3	24	(United States)	Amber Brooks	MF	Portland Thorns FC
2014	1	1	(United States)	Crystal Dunn	FW	Washington Spirit
2014	1	2	(United States)	Kealia Ohai	FW	Houston Dash
2014	2	17	(United States)	Megan Brigman	DF	Seattle Reign FC
2016	2	16	(New Zealand)	Katie Bowen	DF	FC Kansas City
2016	3	25	(United States)	Paige Nielsen	DF	Seattle Reign FC
2016	3	28	(United States)	Alexa Newfield	FW	FC Kansas City
2016	3	30	(United States)	Summer Green	FW	Seattle Reign FC
2017	4	36	(United States)	Cameron Castleberry	MF	Washington Spirit
2018	3	24	(United States)	Megan Buckingham	MF	Chicago Red Stars
2018	3	30	(United States)	Abby Elinsky	MF	Houston Dash
2018	4	32	(United States)	Joanna Boyles	MF	Boston Breakers
2019	1	6	(United States)	Julia Ashley	DF	Sky Blue FC
2019	1	8	(United States)	Dorian Bailey	MF	Washington Spirit
2019	4	32	(Peru)	Alexandra Kimball	MF	Utah Royals FC
2020	2	18	(United States)	Bridgette Andrzejewski	FW	Houston Dash
2021	1	1	(United States)	Emily Fox	DF	Racing Louisville FC
2021	1	3	(United States)	Brianna Pinto	MF	Sky Blue FC
2021	2	11	(United States)	Taylor Otto	MF	Racing Louisville FC
2022	2	20	(United States)	Claudia Dickey	GK	OL Reign
2023	3	25	(United States)	Tori Hansen	DF	Orlando Pride
2024	1	1	(United States)	Ally Sentnor	MF	Utah Royals
2024	1	2	(United States)	Savy King	DF	Bay FC
2024	1	14	(United States)	Maycee Bell	DF	NJ/NY Gotham FC
2024	2	17	(United States)	Sam Meza	MF	Seattle Reign FC
2024	2	19	(United States)	Avery Patterson	FW	Houston Dash
2024	3	40	(United States)	Julia Dorsey	DF	North Carolina Courage

== Northeastern Huskies ==
All-time Northeastern Huskies NWSL Draft picks
Draft	Round	Pick	Nat.	Player	Pos.	NWSL team
2015	4	33	(United States)	Bianca Calderone	DF	Boston Breakers

== Northern Colorado Bears ==
All-time Northern Colorado Bears NWSL Draft picks
Draft	Round	Pick	Nat.	Player	Pos.	NWSL team
2016	4	35	(United States)	Adrienne Jordan	DF	Chicago Red Stars

== Northwestern Wildcats ==
All-time Northwestern Wildcats NWSL Draft picks
Draft	Round	Pick	Nat.	Player	Pos.	NWSL team
2019	3	26	(United States)	Kayla Sharples	DF	Chicago Red Stars
2019	4	30	(United States)	Marisa Viggiano	MF	Orlando Pride
2019	4	33	(United States)	Hannah Davison	DF	Chicago Red Stars

== Notre Dame Fighting Irish ==
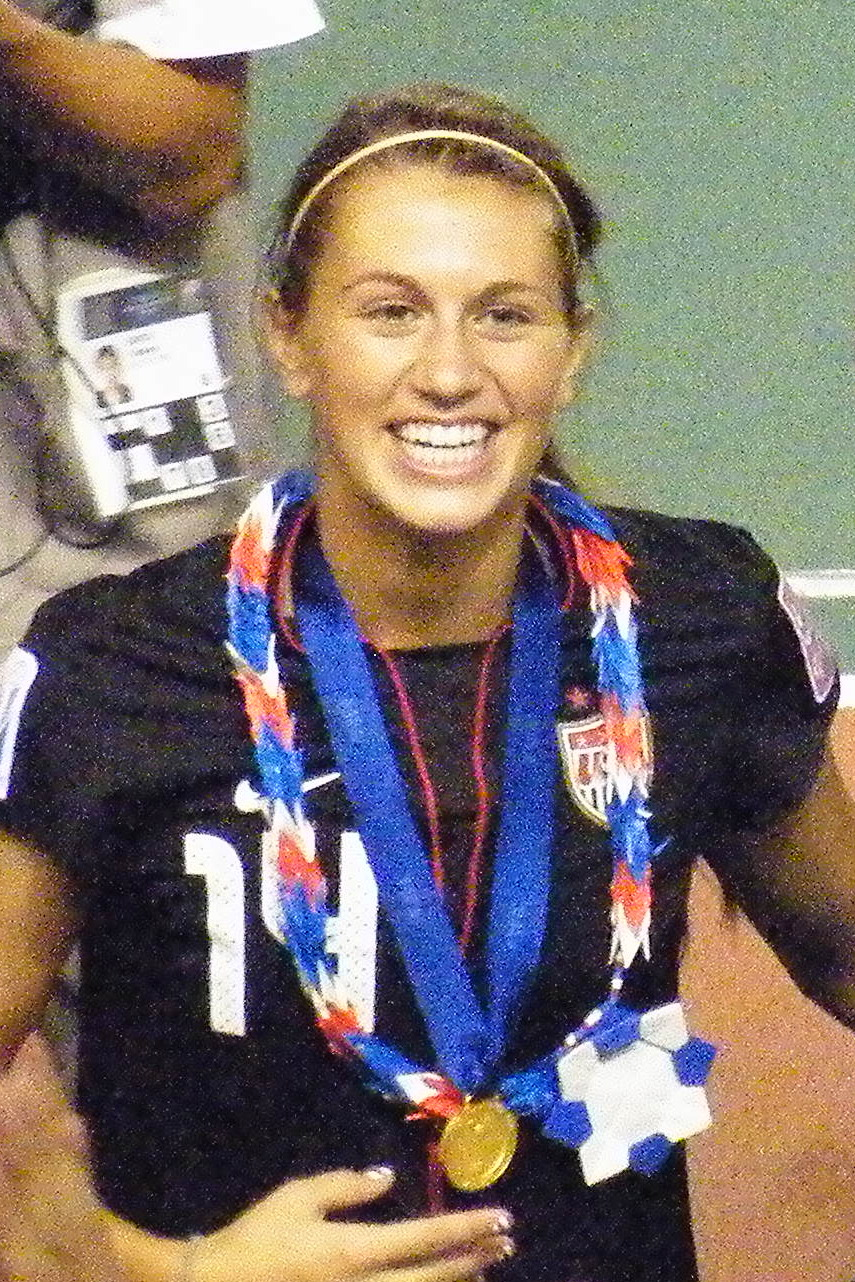
Notre Dame's Mandy Laddish was a two-time NWSL Champion with FC Kansas City.

All-time Notre Dame Fighting Irish NWSL Draft picks
Draft	Round	Pick	Nat.	Player	Pos.	NWSL team
2014	3	20	(United States)	Mandy Laddish	MF	FC Kansas City
2016	1	5	(United States)	Cari Roccaro	DF	Houston Dash
2016	2	19	(United States)	Katie Naughton	DF	Chicago Red Stars
2018	1	8	(United States)	Sandra Yu	MF	Portland Thorns FC
2019	4	34	(Mexico)	Sabrina Flores	DF	Sky Blue FC
2022	2	19	(El Salvador)	Samantha Fisher	MF	Chicago Red Stars
2023	1	6	(United States)	Olivia Wingate	FW	North Carolina Courage
2023	2	17	(United States)	Brianna Martinez	DF	Racing Louisville FC
2024	2	21	(Jamaica)	Kiki Van Zanten	FW	Houston Dash
2024	2	27	(United States)	Maddie Mercado	FW	Seattle Reign FC

== Ohio State Buckeyes ==
All-time Ohio State Buckeyes NWSL Draft picks
Draft	Round	Pick	Nat.	Player	Pos.	NWSL team
2017	2	19	(Canada)	Lindsay Agnew	FW	Washington Spirit
2017	3	28	(Canada)	Nichelle Prince	FW	Houston Dash
2022	4	43	(United States)	Izzy Rodriguez	DF	Kansas City Current
2023	2	16	(United States)	Kayla Fischer	FW	Racing Louisville FC
2024	2	28	(United States)	Emma Sears	FW	Racing Louisville FC

== Oklahoma State Cowgirls ==
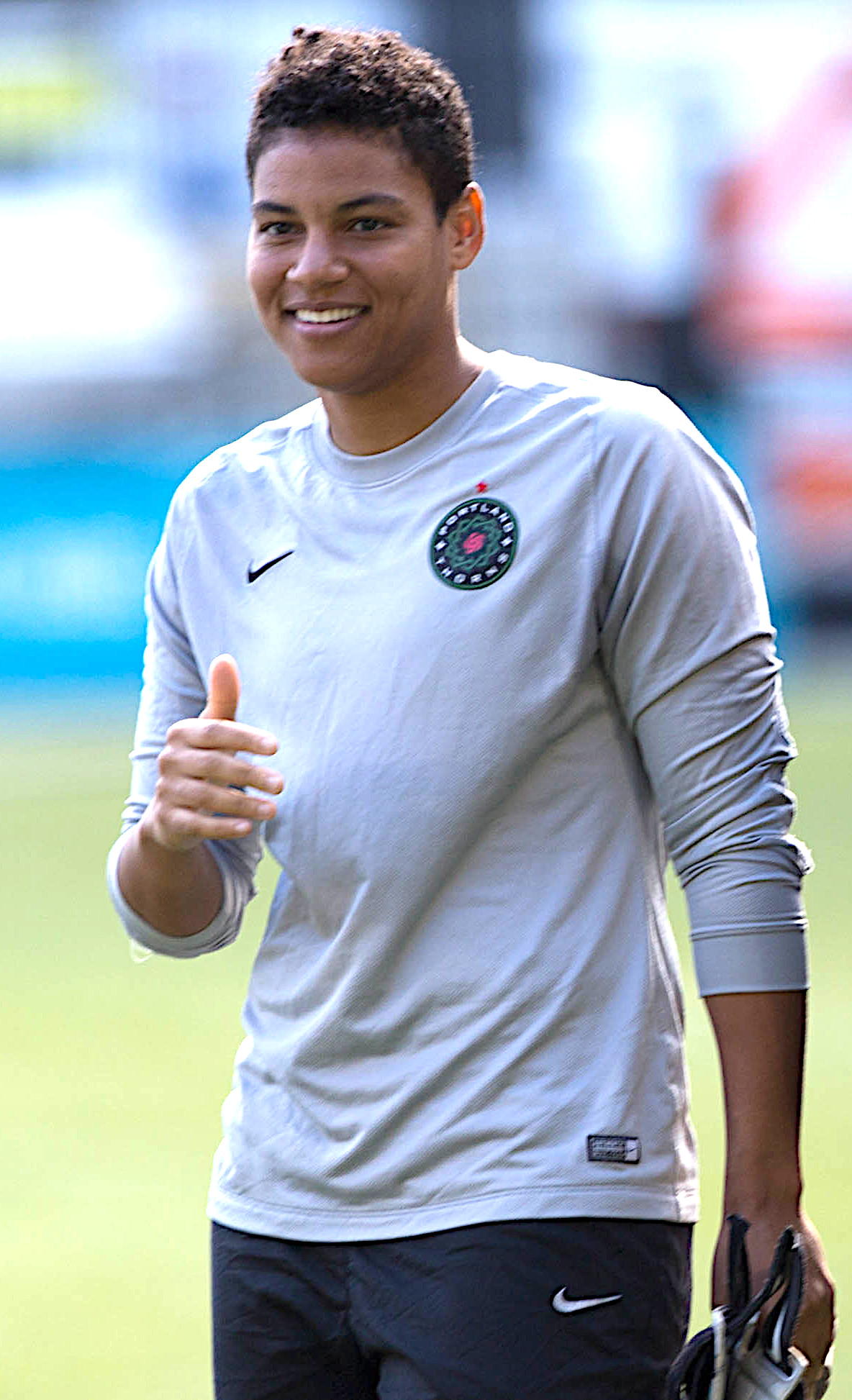
Selected sixth overall in 2013, Oklahoma's Adrianna Franch is the only goalkeeper in NWSL history to be drafted in the first round.

All-time Oklahoma State Cowgirls NWSL Draft picks
Draft	Round	Pick	Nat.	Player	Pos.	NWSL team
2013	1	6	(United States)	Adrianna Franch	GK	Western New York Flash
2022	2	16	(United States)	Charmé Morgan	DF	Racing Louisville FC
2023	2	14	(United States)	Grace Yochum	MF	Chicago Red Stars

== Ole Miss Rebels ==
All-time Ole Miss Rebels NWSL Draft picks
Draft	Round	Pick	Nat.	Player	Pos.	NWSL team
2014	2	10	(Brazil)	Rafaelle Souza	FW	Houston Dash
2019	2	13	(United States)	Cece Kizer	FW	Houston Dash
2021	4	32	(United States)	Channing Foster	FW	Chicago Red Stars
2022	3	29	(United States)	Haleigh Stackpole	MF	North Carolina Courage
2023	4	47	(United States)	Ashley Orkus	GK	Kansas City Current

== Oregon Ducks ==
All-time Oregon Ducks NWSL Draft picks
Draft	Round	Pick	Nat.	Player	Pos.	NWSL team
2019	3	21	(United States)	Jazmin Jackmon	DF	Houston Dash
2022	2	17	(United States)	Chardonnay Curran	MF	Kansas City Current

== Oregon State Beavers ==
All-time Oregon State Beavers NWSL Draft picks
Draft	Round	Pick	Nat.	Player	Pos.	NWSL team
2018	3	29	(United States)	Bella Geist	GK	Portland Thorns FC

== Penn State Nittany Lions ==
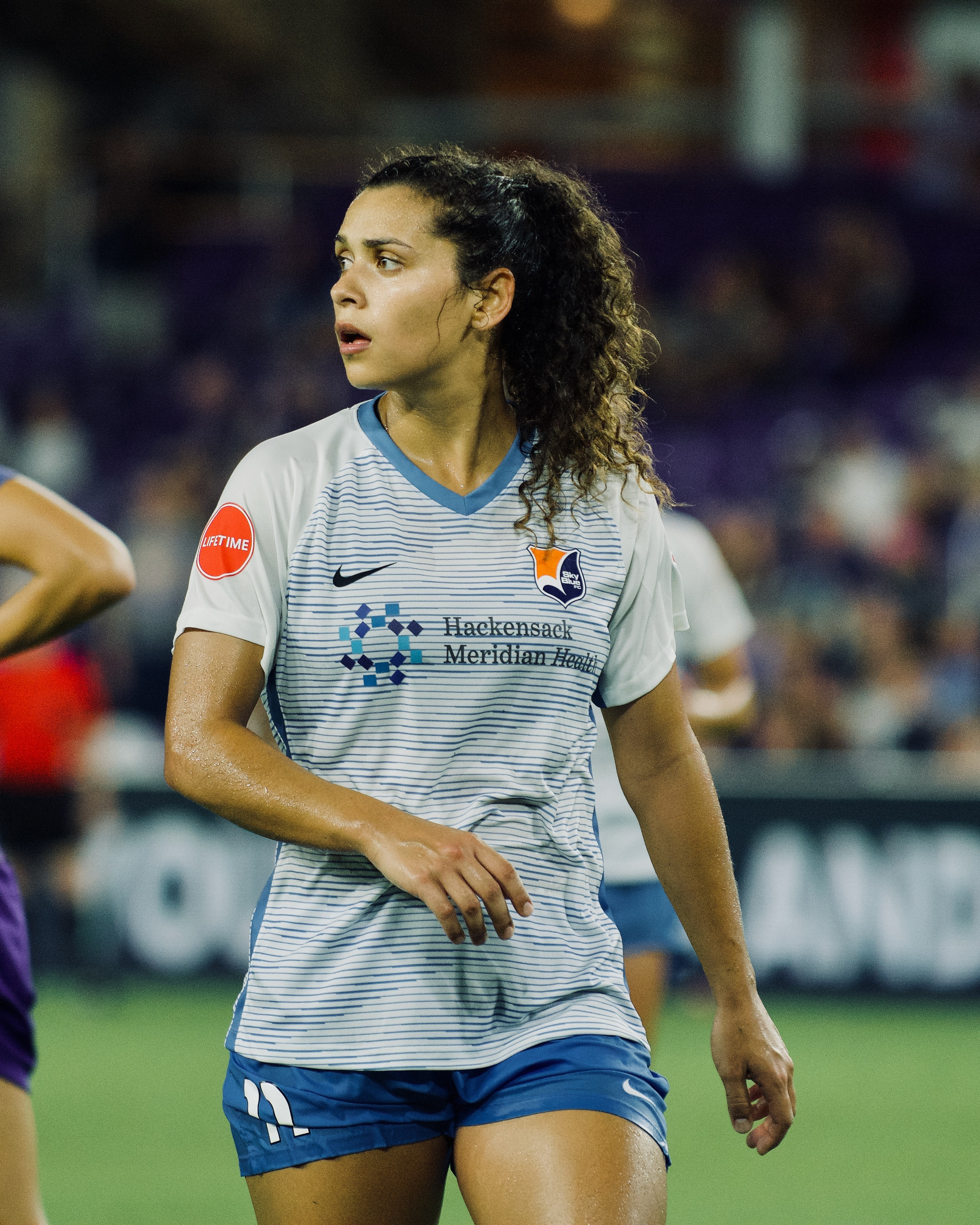
Penn State's Raquel Rodríguez was named NWSL Rookie of the Year in 2016.

All-time Penn State Nittany Lions NWSL Draft picks
Draft	Round	Pick	Nat.	Player	Pos.	NWSL team
2013	1	7	(United States)	Christine Nairn	MF	Seattle Reign FC
2013	4	29	(United States)	Maddy Evans	MF	Boston Breakers
2014	1	6	(United States)	Maya Hayes	FW	Sky Blue FC
2015	4	30	(United States)	Whitney Church	DF	Washington Spirit
2016	1	2	(Costa Rica)	Rocky Rodríguez	FW	Sky Blue FC
2016	2	14	(United States)	Mallory Weber	FW	Western New York Flash
2016	3	26	(United States)	Britt Eckerstrom	GK	Western New York Flash
2017	4	32	(Puerto Rico)	Nickolette Driesse	MF	Orlando Pride
2018	1	10	(United States)	Frannie Crouse	FW	North Carolina Courage
2018	3	21	(United States)	Brittany Basinger	DF	Washington Spirit
2019	3	24	(United States)	Emily Ogle	MF	Portland Thorns FC
2019	3	27	(United States)	Maddie Nolf	DF	Utah Royals FC
2020	2	11	(United States)	Kaleigh Riehl	DF	Sky Blue FC
2021	2	12	(United States)	Sam Coffey	MF	Portland Thorns FC
2021	3	24	(United States)	Kerry Abello	DF	Orlando Pride
2023	1	7	(United States)	Penelope Hocking	FW	Chicago Red Stars
2023	2	23	(United States)	Ally Schlegel	FW	Chicago Red Stars
2024	1	7	(United States)	Kate Wiesner	DF	Washington Spirit
2024	1	11	(United States)	Payton Linnehan	FW	Portland Thorns FC
2024	2	18	(United States)	Ellie Wheeler	DF	Kansas City Current
2024	2	22	(United States)	Cori Dyke	MF	Orlando Pride
2024	3	39	(United States)	Kat Asman	GK	Portland Thorns FC

== Pepperdine Waves ==
All-time Pepperdine Waves NWSL Draft picks
Draft	Round	Pick	Nat.	Player	Pos.	NWSL team
2013	4	32	(South Africa)	Roxanne Barker	GK	Portland Thorns FC
2014	3	24	(Chinese Taipei)	Michelle Pao	MF	Sky Blue FC
2015	1	6	(United States)	Lynn Williams	FW	Western New York Flash
2018	2	19	(United States)	Brianna Visalli	MF	Chicago Red Stars
2019	1	9	(United States)	Hailey Harbison	FW	North Carolina Courage
2019	3	23	(United States)	Michelle Maemone	DF	Utah Royals FC
2021	3	26	(United States)	Joelle Anderson	MF	Houston Dash

== Pittsburgh Panthers ==
All-time Pittsburgh Panthers NWSL Draft picks
Draft	Round	Pick	Nat.	Player	Pos.	NWSL team
2024	3	36	(Canada)	Amanda West	FW	Houston Dash
2024	4	52	(United States)	Landy Mertz	FW	North Carolina Courage

== Portland Pilots ==
All-time Portland Pilots NWSL Draft picks
Draft	Round	Pick	Nat.	Player	Pos.	NWSL team
2013	2	12	(United States)	Kendall Johnson	DF	Sky Blue FC
2014	1	7	(United States)	Amanda Frisbie	DF	Seattle Reign FC
2014	4	30	(United States)	Ellen Parker	MF	Seattle Reign FC

== Princeton Tigers ==
All-time Princeton Tigers NWSL Draft picks
Draft	Round	Pick	Nat.	Player	Pos.	NWSL team
2013	4	25	(United States)	Jen Hoy	FW	Chicago Red Stars
2017	3	21	(United States)	Tyler Lussi	FW	Portland Thorns FC
2024	4	51	(United States)	Madison Curry	DF	Angel City FC

== Purdue Boilermakers ==
All-time Purdue Boilermakers NWSL Draft picks
Draft	Round	Pick	Nat.	Player	Pos.	NWSL team
2022	3	35	(United States)	Sarah Griffith	FW	Chicago Red Stars
2022	4	45	(United States)	Marisa Bova	GK	North Carolina Courage

== Rutgers Scarlet Knights ==
All-time Rutgers Scarlet Knights NWSL Draft picks
Draft	Round	Pick	Nat.	Player	Pos.	NWSL team
2016	2	18	(Dominican Republic)	Brianne Reed	DF	FC Kansas City
2016	3	23	(United States)	Erica Skroski	DF	Sky Blue FC
2017	3	24	(United States)	Madison Tiernan	FW	Sky Blue FC
2017	4	33	(United States)	Erin Smith	DF	Houston Dash
2018	2	13	(United States)	Casey Murphy	GK	Sky Blue FC
2019	4	29	(United States)	Kenie Wright	MF	Sky Blue FC
2020	4	29	(Jamaica)	Chantelle Swaby	MF	Sky Blue FC
2021	3	22	(United States)	Amirah Ali	FW	Portland Thorns FC
2022	2	22	(United States)	Gabby Provenzano	DF	Portland Thorns FC

== Saint Mary's Gaels ==
All-time Saint Mary's Gaels NWSL Draft picks
Draft	Round	Pick	Nat.	Player	Pos.	NWSL team
2024	4	43	(United States)	Makena Carr	MF	Seattle Reign FC

== San Francisco Dons ==
All-time San Francisco Dons NWSL Draft picks
Draft	Round	Pick	Nat.	Player	Pos.	NWSL team
2016	4	34	(United States)	Madalyn Schiffel	GK	Washington Spirit

== Santa Clara Broncos ==
All-time Santa Clara Broncos NWSL Draft picks
Draft	Round	Pick	Nat.	Player	Pos.	NWSL team
2014	1	3	(United States)	Julie Johnston	DF	Chicago Red Stars
2014	2	12	(United States)	Morgan Marlborough	FW	FC Kansas City
2015	2	11	(United States)	Sofia Huerta	FW	Chicago Red Stars
2016	4	31	(United States)	Dani Weatherholt	MF	Orlando Pride
2019	2	15	(Mexico)	María Sánchez	FW	Chicago Red Stars
2020	1	9	(United States)	Kelcie Hedge	MF	Reign FC
2021	2	18	(United States)	Kelsey Turnbow	FW	Chicago Red Stars
2021	4	36	(United States)	Alex Loera	MF	Kansas City NWSL
2022	1	11	(United States)	Julie Doyle	FW	Orlando Pride
2022	3	32	(United States)	Kaile Halvorsen	FW	OL Reign
2023	1	12	(United States)	Izzy D'Aquila	FW	Portland Thorns FC
2024	4	47	(United States)	Alyssa Bourgeois	DF	Houston Dash

== Seattle Redhawks ==
All-time Seattle Redhawks NWSL Draft picks
Draft	Round	Pick	Nat.	Player	Pos.	NWSL team
2015	4	29	(United States)	Stephanie Verdoia	FW	Boston Breakers

== South Carolina Gamecocks ==
All-time South Carolina Gamecocks NWSL Draft picks
Draft	Round	Pick	Nat.	Player	Pos.	NWSL team
2015	3	21	(Canada)	Sabrina D'Angelo	GK	Western New York Flash
2018	1	2	(United States)	Savannah McCaskill	FW	Boston Breakers
2022	4	44	(United States)	Ryan Gareis	FW	Houston Dash
2023	2	22	(United States)	Jyllissa Harris	DF	Houston Dash
2024	3	38	(United States)	Heather Hinz	GK	Houston Dash

== South Florida Bulls ==
All-time South Florida Bulls NWSL Draft picks
Draft	Round	Pick	Nat.	Player	Pos.	NWSL team
2020	1	5	(Canada)	Evelyne Viens	FW	Sky Blue FC
2022	2	13	(United States)	Sydny Nasello	FW	Portland Thorns FC

== St. John's Red Storm ==
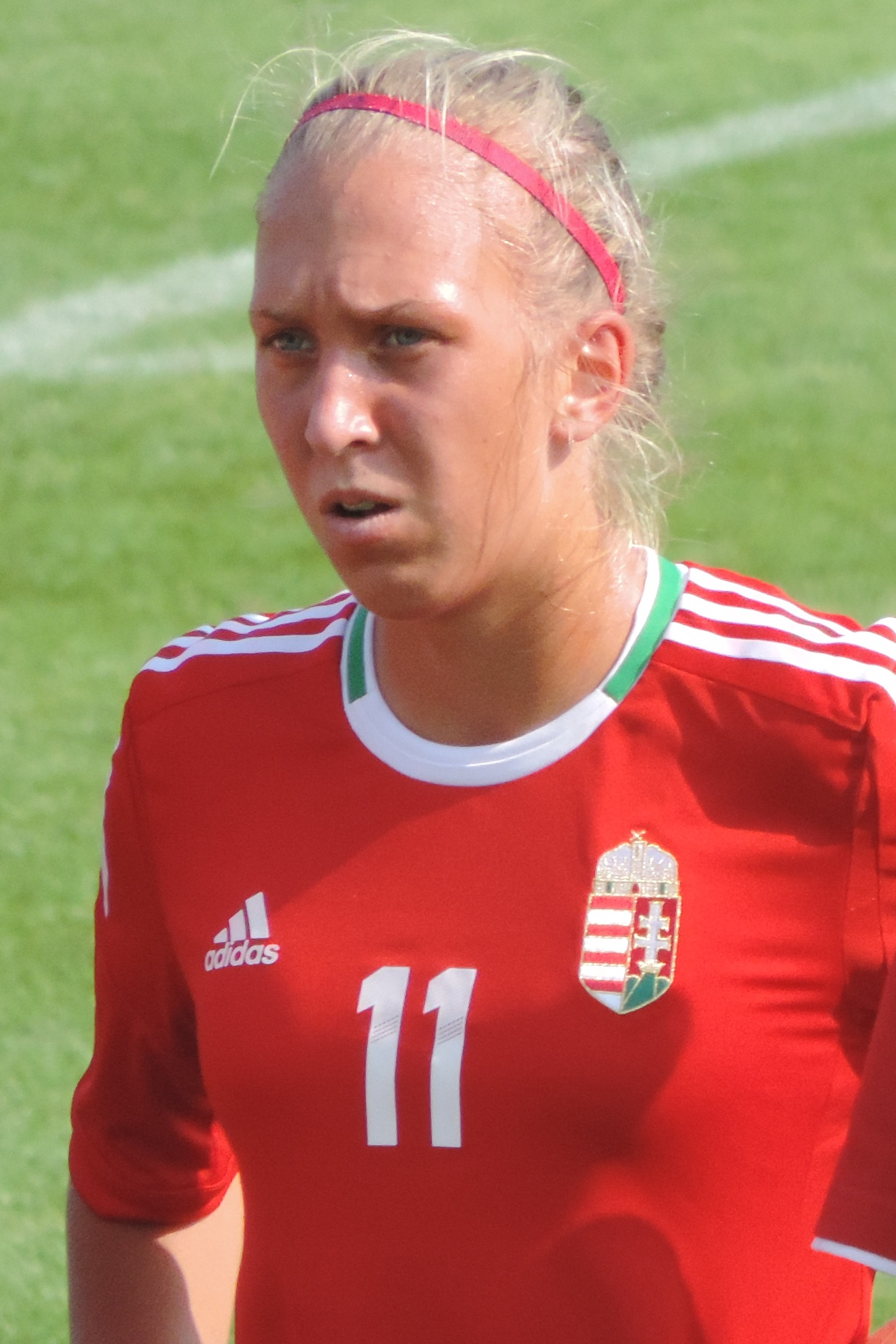
In 2022, St. John's' Zsanett Kaján became the first Hungarian to be selected in an NWSL Draft.

All-time St. John's Red Storm NWSL Draft picks
Draft	Round	Pick	Nat.	Player	Pos.	NWSL team
2016	1	6	(England)	Rachel Daly	FW	Houston Dash
2022	1	8	(Hungary)	Zsanett Kaján	FW	OL Reign
2024	4	44	(United States)	Jessica Garziano	MF	Angel City FC

== Stanford Cardinal ==
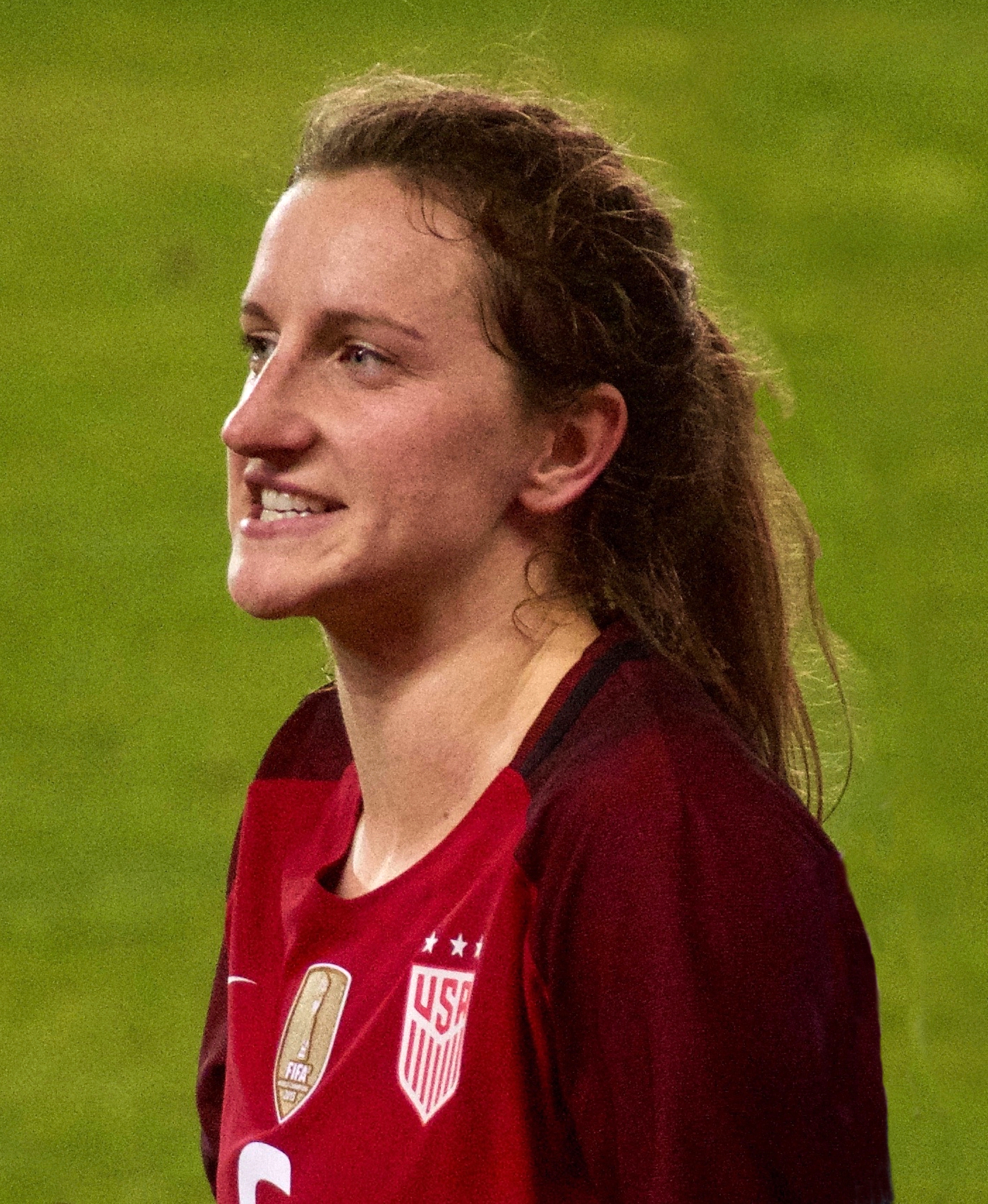
Selected first overall in 2018, Andi Sullivan was the first in a string of three consecutive #1 picks out of Stanford.

All-time Stanford Cardinal NWSL Draft picks
Draft	Round	Pick	Nat.	Player	Pos.	NWSL team
2013	2	9	(Canada)	Rachel Quon	DF	Chicago Red Stars
2013	2	13	(Samoa)	Mariah Nogueira	MF	Boston Breakers
2014	1	9	(United States)	Courtney Verloo	FW	Western New York Flash
2015	4	28	(England)	Chioma Ubogagu	FW	Sky Blue FC
2015	4	34	(United States)	Lo'eau LaBonta	FW	Sky Blue FC
2015	4	36	(United States)	Kendall Romine	DF	Seattle Reign FC
2016	3	24	(United States)	Laura Liedle	DF	Western New York Flash
2017	1	6	(United States)	Maddie Bauer	DF	Seattle Reign FC
2017	2	15	(United States)	Jane Campbell	GK	Houston Dash
2018	1	1	(United States)	Andi Sullivan	MF	Washington Spirit
2019	1	1	(United States)	Tierna Davidson	DF	Chicago Red Stars
2019	1	3	(United States)	Jordan DiBiasi	MF	Washington Spirit
2019	1	7	(United States)	Tegan McGrady	DF	Washington Spirit
2020	1	1	(United States)	Sophia Smith	FW	Portland Thorns FC
2020	4	33	(United States)	Sam Hiatt	MF	Reign FC
2021	1	4	(United States)	Kiki Pickett	DF	Kansas City NWSL
2021	1	7	(United States)	Madison Haley	FW	Chicago Red Stars
2022	1	1	(United States)	Naomi Girma	DF	San Diego Wave FC
2022	3	27	(United States)	Belle Briede	MF	San Diego Wave FC
2023	2	13	(United States)	Sierra Enge	MF	San Diego Wave FC
2024	1	8	(United States)	Maya Doms	MF	Bay FC
2024	1	12	(United States)	Kennedy Wesley	DF	San Diego Wave FC
2024	4	53	(United States)	Katie Duong	MF	Portland Thorns FC

== TCU Horned Frogs ==
All-time TCU Horned Frogs NWSL Draft picks
Draft	Round	Pick	Nat.	Player	Pos.	NWSL team
2018	4	40	(United States)	Ryan Williams	DF	North Carolina Courage
2021	1	6	(United States)	Yazmeen Ryan	MF	Portland Thorns FC
2022	4	41	(United States)	Jenna Winebrenner	DF	Kansas City Current
2023	2	21	(United States)	Messiah Bright	FW	Orlando Pride

== Texas A&M Aggies ==
All-time Texas A&M Aggies NWSL Draft picks
Draft	Round	Pick	Nat.	Player	Pos.	NWSL team
2015	2	12	(United States)	Shea Groom	FW	FC Kansas City
2015	2	16	(United States)	Meghan Streight	DF	FC Kansas City
2015	3	24	(United States)	Bianca Brinson	FW	Boston Breakers
2020	1	6	(United States)	Ally Watt	FW	North Carolina Courage
2021	2	17	(United States)	Addie McCain	MF	Kansas City NWSL
2021	3	28	(Mexico)	Jimena López	DF	OL Reign

== Texas Longhorns ==
All-time Texas Longhorns NWSL Draft picks
Draft	Round	Pick	Nat.	Player	Pos.	NWSL team
2016	3	27	(United States)	Abby Smith	GK	Boston Breakers
2020	4	31	(United States)	Cyera Hintzen	FW	Utah Royals FC

== Texas Tech Red Raiders ==
All-time Texas Tech Red Raiders NWSL Draft picks
Draft	Round	Pick	Nat.	Player	Pos.	NWSL team
2014	2	15	(United States)	Hayley Haagsma	DF	Sky Blue FC
2015	1	7	(United States)	Jaelene Hinkle	DF	Western New York Flash
2016	1	8	(Canada)	Janine Beckie	FW	Houston Dash
2016	2	20	(Republic of Ireland)	Alli Murphy	MF	Washington Spirit
2021	2	13	(United States)	Kirsten Davis	FW	Racing Louisville FC
2024	3	31	(United States)	Hannah Anderson	DF	Chicago Red Stars
2024	4	50	(United States)	Alex Kerr	FW	Orlando Pride
2024	4	54	(United States)	Madison White	GK	Racing Louisville FC

== UC Irvine Anteaters ==
All-time UC Irvine Anteaters NWSL Draft picks
Draft	Round	Pick	Nat.	Player	Pos.	NWSL team
2018	4	35	(Mexico)	Kiana Palacios	FW	Sky Blue FC

== UCF Knights ==
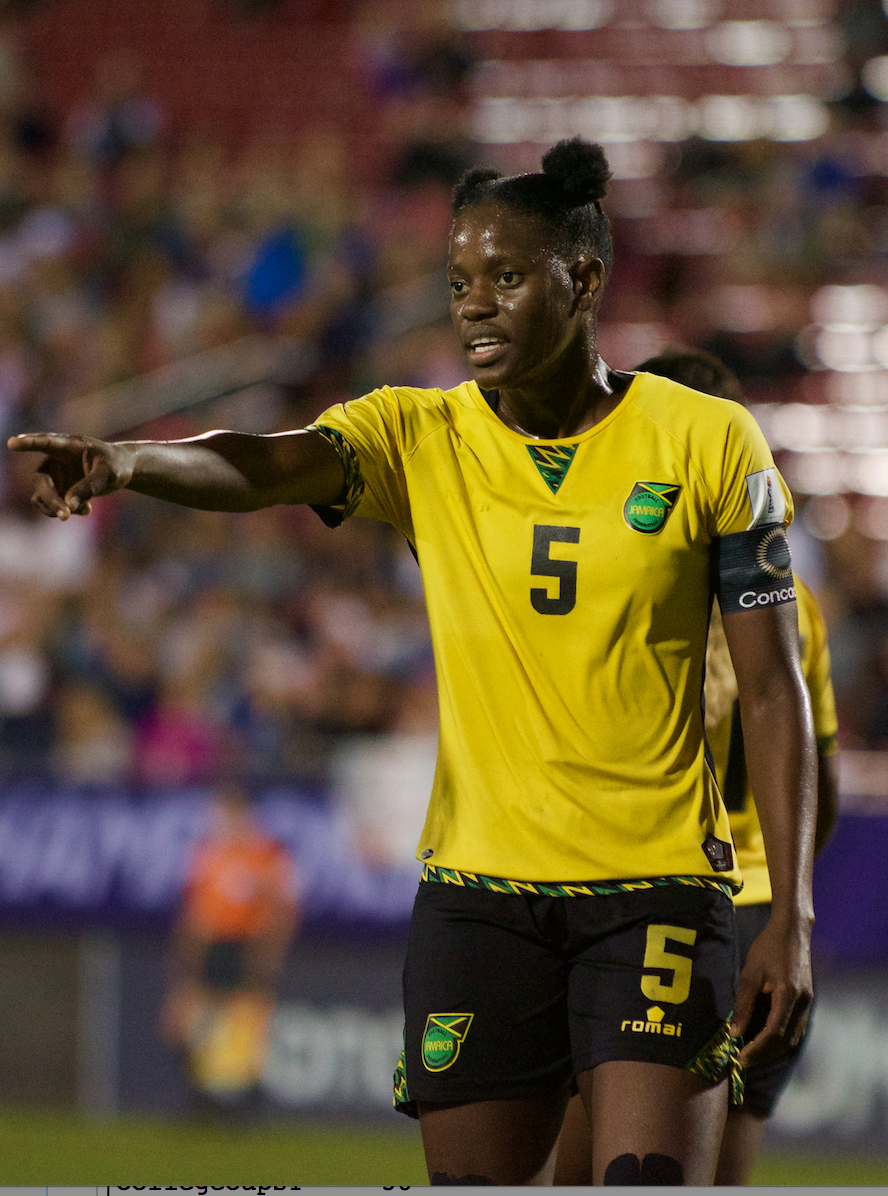
In 2020, UCF's Konya Plummer became the first Jamaican-born player to be selected in an NWSL Draft.

All-time UCF Knights NWSL Draft picks
Draft	Round	Pick	Nat.	Player	Pos.	NWSL team
2013	2	16	(United States)	Nicolette Radovcic	FW	Portland Thorns FC
2014	2	11	(United States)	Marissa Diggs	DF	Houston Dash
2015	2	18	(United States)	Tatiana Coleman	FW	Western New York Flash
2015	4	31	(United States)	Carleigh Williams	DF	Houston Dash
2020	2	10	(Jamaica)	Konya Plummer	DF	Orlando Pride
2023	4	41	(United States)	Kristen Scott	FW	Orlando Pride
2024	4	56	(United States)	Talia Gabarra	MF	Orlando Pride

== UCLA Bruins ==
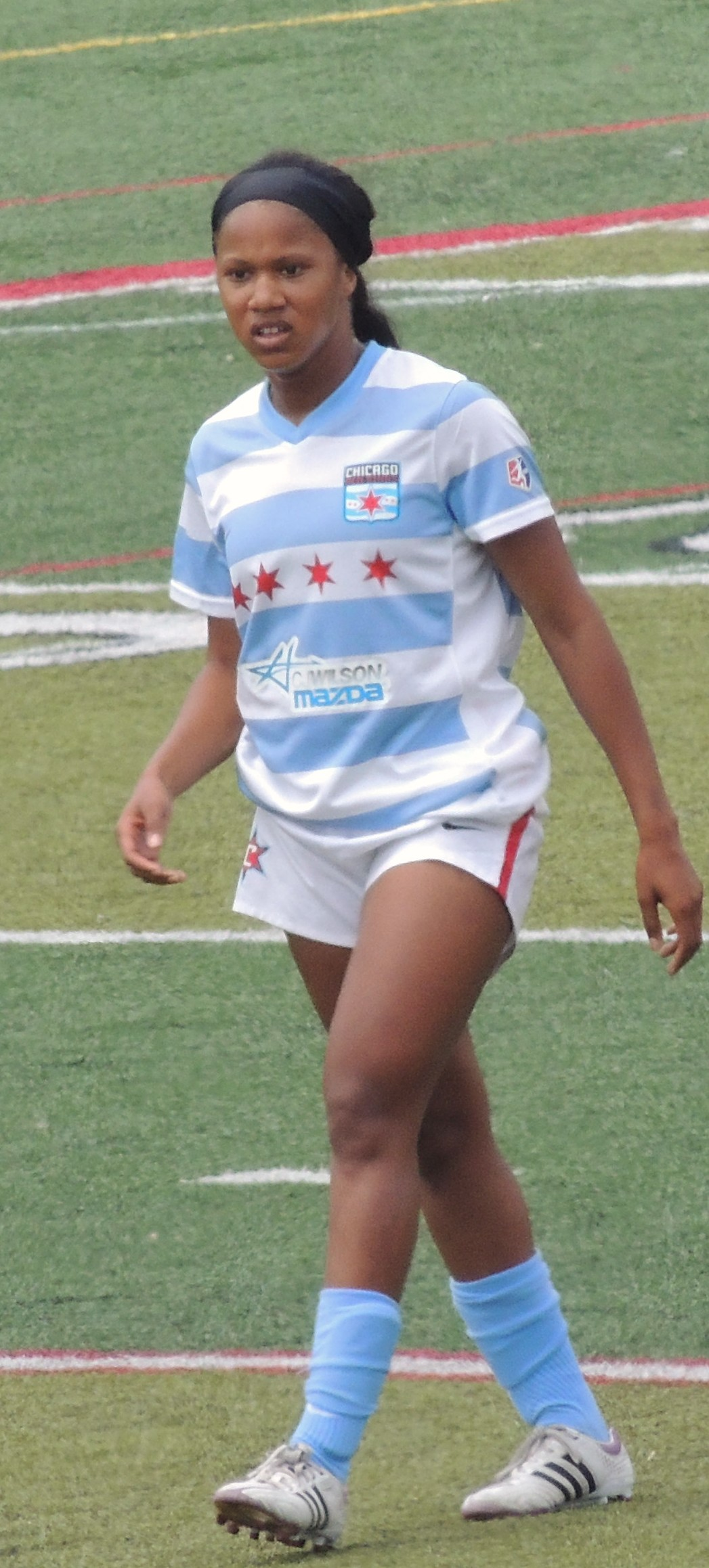
UCLA's Zakiya Bywaters was the first overall selection in the first NWSL College Draft.

All-time UCLA Bruins NWSL Draft picks
Draft	Round	Pick	Nat.	Player	Pos.	NWSL team
2013	1	1	(United States)	Zakiya Bywaters	FW	Chicago Red Stars
2014	2	16	(United States)	Jenna Richmond	MF	FC Kansas City
2015	1	2	(United States)	Sarah Killion	MF	Sky Blue FC
2015	1	3	(United States)	Abby Dahlkemper	DF	Western New York Flash
2015	1	4	(United States)	Sam Mewis	MF	Western New York Flash
2015	2	13	(United States)	Megan Oyster	DF	Washington Spirit
2015	2	17	(United States)	Katelyn Rowland	GK	FC Kansas City
2015	3	19	(United States)	Caprice Dydasco	DF	Washington Spirit
2017	1	7	(United States)	Darian Jenkins	DF	North Carolina Courage
2017	4	39	(United States)	Lauren Kaskie	MF	Chicago Red Stars
2018	3	27	(United States)	Zoey Goralski	DF	Chicago Red Stars
2019	1	2	(United States)	Hailie Mace	DF	Sky Blue FC
2020	1	4	(United States)	Ashley Sanchez	FW	Washington Spirit
2020	3	22	(United States)	Chloe Castaneda	FW	Houston Dash
2020	4	32	(United States)	Kaiya McCullough	DF	Washington Spirit
2021	1	9	(United States)	Viviana Villacorta	MF	Orlando Pride
2021	2	16	(England)	Lucy Parker	DF	Kansas City NWSL
2021	4	33	(United States)	Delanie Sheehan	DF	Sky Blue FC
2022	1	5	(United States)	Mia Fishel	FW	Orlando Pride
2022	4	47	(United States)	Marley Canales	MF	OL Reign
2023	3	33	(Hungary)	Lauren Brzykcy	GK	San Diego Wave FC
2023	4	48	(United States)	Madelyn Desiano	DF	Houston Dash
2024	1	6	(United States)	Reilyn Turner	FW	Racing Louisville FC
2024	1	9	(United States)	Ally Lemos	MF	Orlando Pride

== UConn Huskies ==
All-time UConn Huskies NWSL Draft picks
Draft	Round	Pick	Nat.	Player	Pos.	NWSL team
2017	2	14	(United States)	Rachel Hill	FW	Portland Thorns FC
2017	2	17	(United States)	Stephanie Ribeiro	FW	FC Kansas City

== UNC Wilmington Seahawks ==
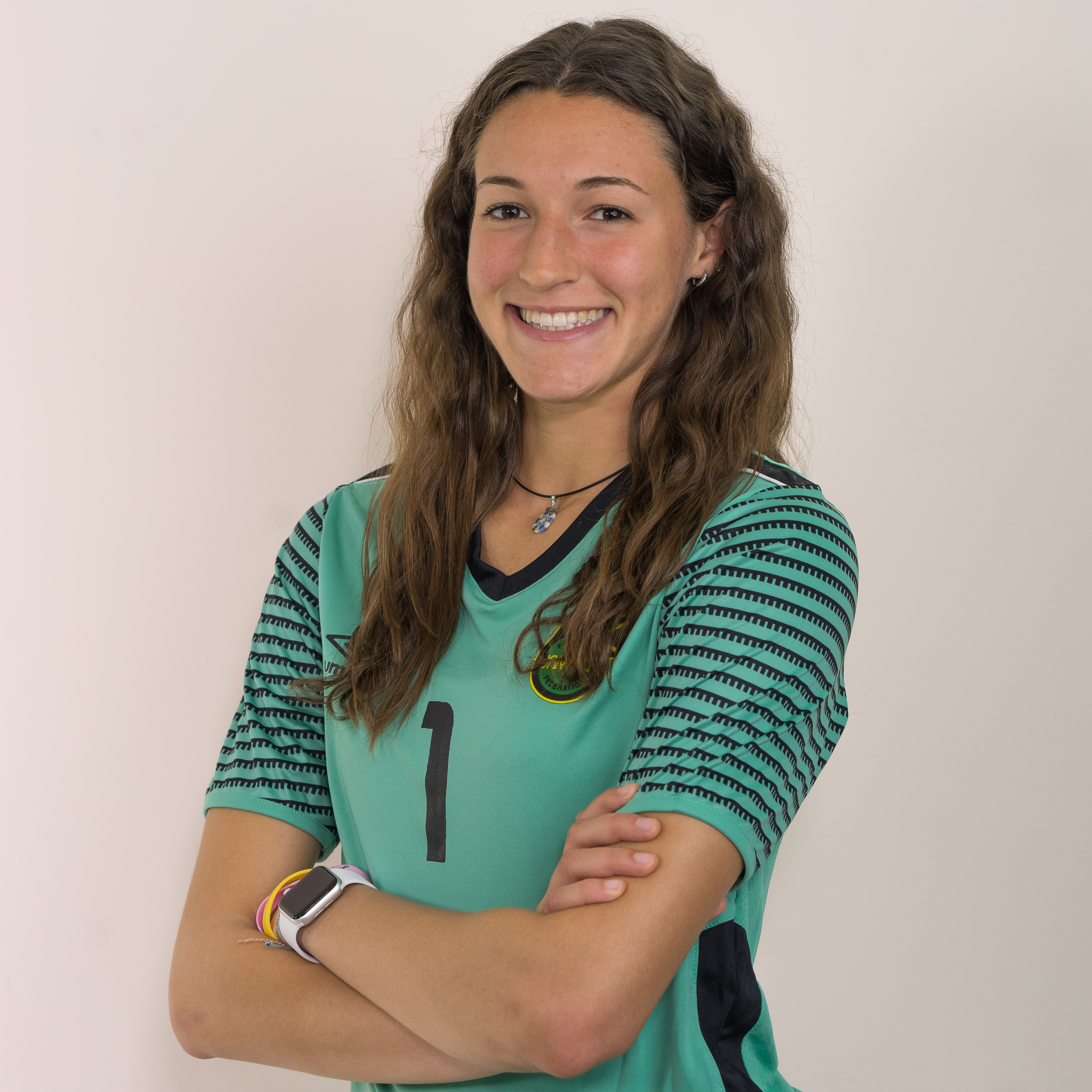
In 2021, Sydney Schneider became the first player to be drafted out of UNC Wilmington.

All-time UNC Wilmington Seahawks NWSL Draft picks
Draft	Round	Pick	Nat.	Player	Pos.	NWSL team
2021	3	29	(Jamaica)	Sydney Schneider	GK	Washington Spirit
2022	3	38	(United States)	Audrey Harding	FW	Washington Spirit

== USC Trojans ==
All-time USC Trojans NWSL Draft picks
Draft	Round	Pick	Nat.	Player	Pos.	NWSL team
2014	4	33	(United States)	Elizabeth Eddy	MF	Sky Blue FC
2017	1	3	(United States)	Morgan Andrews	MF	Boston Breakers
2017	1	4	(United States)	Kayla Mills	DF	Sky Blue FC
2017	1	10	(United States)	Mandy Freeman	DF	Sky Blue FC
2017	2	16	(Mexico)	Katie Johnson	FW	Seattle Reign FC
2017	4	31	(United States)	Sammy Jo Prudhomme	GK	Boston Breakers
2019	1	5	(United States)	Leah Pruitt	FW	North Carolina Courage
2019	2	12	(United States)	Ally Prisock	DF	Houston Dash
2020	2	13	(United States)	Natalie Jacobs	MF	Washington Spirit
2020	2	15	(United States)	Julia Bingham	DF	Chicago Red Stars
2021	1	8	(United States)	Tara McKeown	FW	Washington Spirit
2021	4	34	(United States)	Kaylie Collins	GK	Orlando Pride
2022	1	4	(United States)	Savannah DeMelo	MF	Racing Louisville FC
2022	3	31	(United States)	Jada Talley	FW	Orlando Pride
2024	3	29	(Canada)	Zoe Burns	DF	Utah Royals

== Utah State Aggies ==
All-time Utah State Aggies NWSL Draft picks
Draft	Round	Pick	Nat.	Player	Pos.	NWSL team
2024	2	25	(United States)	Kelsey Kaufusi	DF	Portland Thorns FC

== Utah Utes ==
All-time Utah Utes NWSL Draft picks
Draft	Round	Pick	Nat.	Player	Pos.	NWSL team
2016	4	40	(United States)	Lindsey Luke	GK	Seattle Reign FC
2024	4	49	(United States)	Courtney Brown	MF	Washington Spirit

== Vanderbilt Commodores ==
All-time Vanderbilt Commodores NWSL Draft picks
Draft	Round	Pick	Nat.	Player	Pos.	NWSL team
2021	3	30	(United States)	Myra Konte	DF	North Carolina Courage
2022	2	15	(United States)	Maddie Elwell	FW	Washington Spirit
2023	4	38	(United States)	Ella Shamburger	DF	Kansas City Current

== Villanova Wildcats ==
All-time Villanova Wildcats NWSL Draft picks
Draft	Round	Pick	Nat.	Player	Pos.	NWSL team
2014	4	32	(United States)	Jami Kranich	GK	Boston Breakers

== Virginia Cavaliers ==
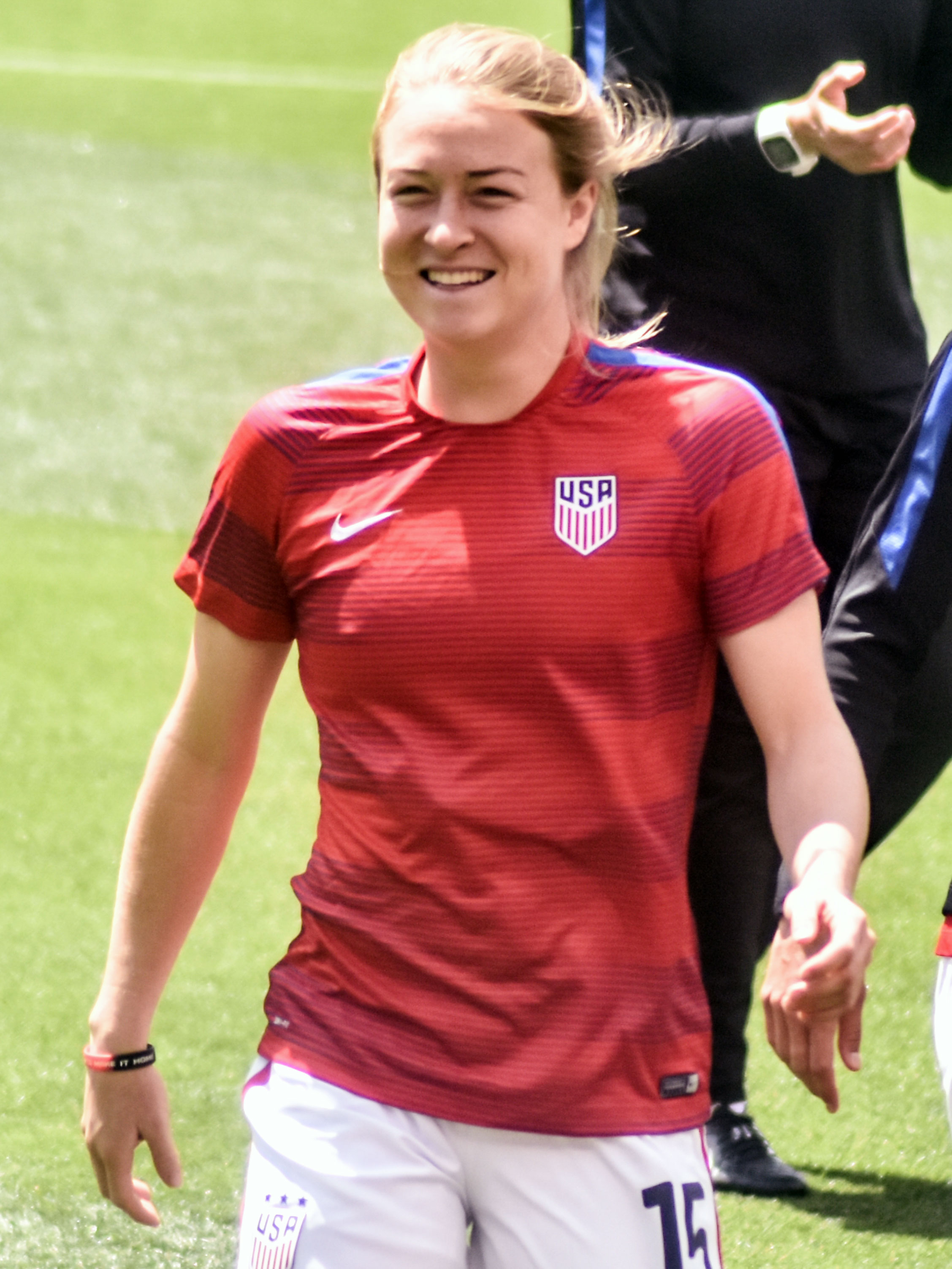
Virginia's Emily Sonnett was selected first overall in 2016, one year after college teammate Morgan Brian also went at #1.

All-time Virginia Cavaliers NWSL Draft picks
Draft	Round	Pick	Nat.	Player	Pos.	NWSL team
2013	2	10	(United States)	Caroline Miller	FW	Washington Spirit
2014	3	26	(United States)	Molly Menchel	DF	Washington Spirit
2014	3	27	(United States)	Annie Steinlage	DF	Western New York Flash
2014	4	29	(United States)	Shasta Fisher	DF	Washington Spirit
2015	1	1	(United States)	Morgan Brian	MF	Houston Dash
2015	1	9	(United States)	Danielle Colaprico	MF	Chicago Red Stars
2016	1	1	(United States)	Emily Sonnett	DF	Portland Thorns FC
2016	2	11	(United States)	Makenzy Doniak	FW	Western New York Flash
2016	2	17	(United States)	Brittany Ratcliffe	MF	Boston Breakers
2017	3	25	(United States)	Alexis Shaffer	MF	FC Kansas City
2017	4	37	(United States)	Kristen McNabb	DF	Seattle Reign FC
2018	3	28	(United States)	Veronica Latsko	FW	Houston Dash
2019	2	16	(United States)	Betsy Brandon	MF	Houston Dash
2020	1	7	(United States)	Courtney Petersen	DF	Orlando Pride
2020	2	14	(United States)	Phoebe McClernon	DF	Orlando Pride
2020	3	19	(United States)	Zoe Morse	MF	Chicago Red Stars
2021	3	23	(United States)	Taryn Torres	MF	Sky Blue FC
2021	4	35	(United States)	Alissa Gorzak	FW	Chicago Red Stars
2022	1	6	(Mexico)	Diana Ordóñez	FW	North Carolina Courage
2023	1	10	(United States)	Alexa Spaanstra	FW	Kansas City Current
2023	1	11	(United States)	Haley Hopkins	FW	North Carolina Courage
2024	2	24	(United States)	Talia Staude	DF	North Carolina Courage

== Virginia Tech Hokies ==
All-time Virginia Tech Hokies NWSL Draft picks
Draft	Round	Pick	Nat.	Player	Pos.	NWSL team
2014	3	21	(United States)	Jazmine Reeves	FW	Boston Breakers
2020	3	20	(United States)	Mandy McGlynn	GK	Sky Blue FC
2022	1	3	(United States)	Emily Gray	MF	North Carolina Courage

== Wake Forest Demon Deacons ==
All-time Wake Forest Demon Deacons NWSL Draft picks
Draft	Round	Pick	Nat.	Player	Pos.	NWSL team
2013	3	23	(United States)	Kristen Meier	MF	Seattle Reign FC
2013	4	30	(United States)	Jackie Logue	DF	Western New York Flash
2018	3	25	(Canada)	Ally Haran	DF	Seattle Reign FC
2018	3	26	(United States)	Maddie Huster	MF	Washington Spirit
2019	2	17	(United States)	Bayley Feist	MF	Washington Spirit
2021	4	37	(United States)	Hannah Betfort	DF	Portland Thorns FC
2022	2	21	(United States)	Ryanne Brown	FW	OL Reign
2022	3	30	(United States)	Jenna Menta	FW	Racing Louisville FC
2023	4	45	(United States)	Giovanna DeMarco	MF	San Diego Wave FC

== Washington Huskies ==
All-time Washington Huskies NWSL Draft picks
Draft	Round	Pick	Nat.	Player	Pos.	NWSL team
2018	2	12	(United States)	Kimberly Keever	FW	Houston Dash
2018	4	33	(United States)	Sarah Shimer	GK	Houston Dash
2022	3	33	(United States)	Olivia Van der Jagt	MF	OL Reign
2023	2	19	(United States)	Shae Holmes	DF	OL Reign
2023	4	39	(United States)	Summer Yates	MF	Orlando Pride

== Washington State Cougars ==
All-time Washington State Cougars NWSL Draft picks
Draft	Round	Pick	Nat.	Player	Pos.	NWSL team
2015	3	27	(Canada)	Nicole Setterlund	MF	Chicago Red Stars
2020	1	2	(United States)	Morgan Weaver	FW	Portland Thorns FC
2020	2	17	(United States)	Averie Collins	MF	Washington Spirit
2021	1	2	(United States)	Trinity Rodman	FW	Washington Spirit
2021	3	25	(United States)	Brianna Alger	DF	Chicago Red Stars
2021	3	27	(United States)	Makamae Gomera-Stevens	FW	Houston Dash
2022	1	7	(United States)	Elyse Bennett	FW	Kansas City Current
2022	2	25	(United States)	Sydney Pulver	MF	San Diego Wave FC
2023	3	35	(United States)	Mykiaa Minniss	DF	Kansas City Current

== West Virginia Mountaineers ==
All-time West Virginia Mountaineers NWSL Draft picks
Draft	Round	Pick	Nat.	Player	Pos.	NWSL team
2014	3	19	(United States)	Frances Silva	FW	FC Kansas City
2018	1	4	(Cameroon)	Michaela Abam	FW	Sky Blue FC
2018	1	6	(Canada)	Amandine Pierre-Louis	DF	Sky Blue FC
2019	3	20	(Canada)	Bianca St-Georges	FW	Chicago Red Stars
2019	3	22	(United States)	Grace Cutler	MF	Houston Dash
2023	2	15	(United States)	Gabrielle Robinson	DF	Kansas City Current

== William & Mary Tribe ==
All-time William & Mary Tribe NWSL Draft picks
Draft	Round	Pick	Nat.	Player	Pos.	NWSL team
2013	2	15	(United States)	Mallory Schaffer	MF	Seattle Reign FC
2016	3	29	(United States)	Caroline Casey	GK	Sky Blue FC
2018	4	31	(United States)	Rachel Moore	MF	Washington Spirit

== Wisconsin Badgers ==
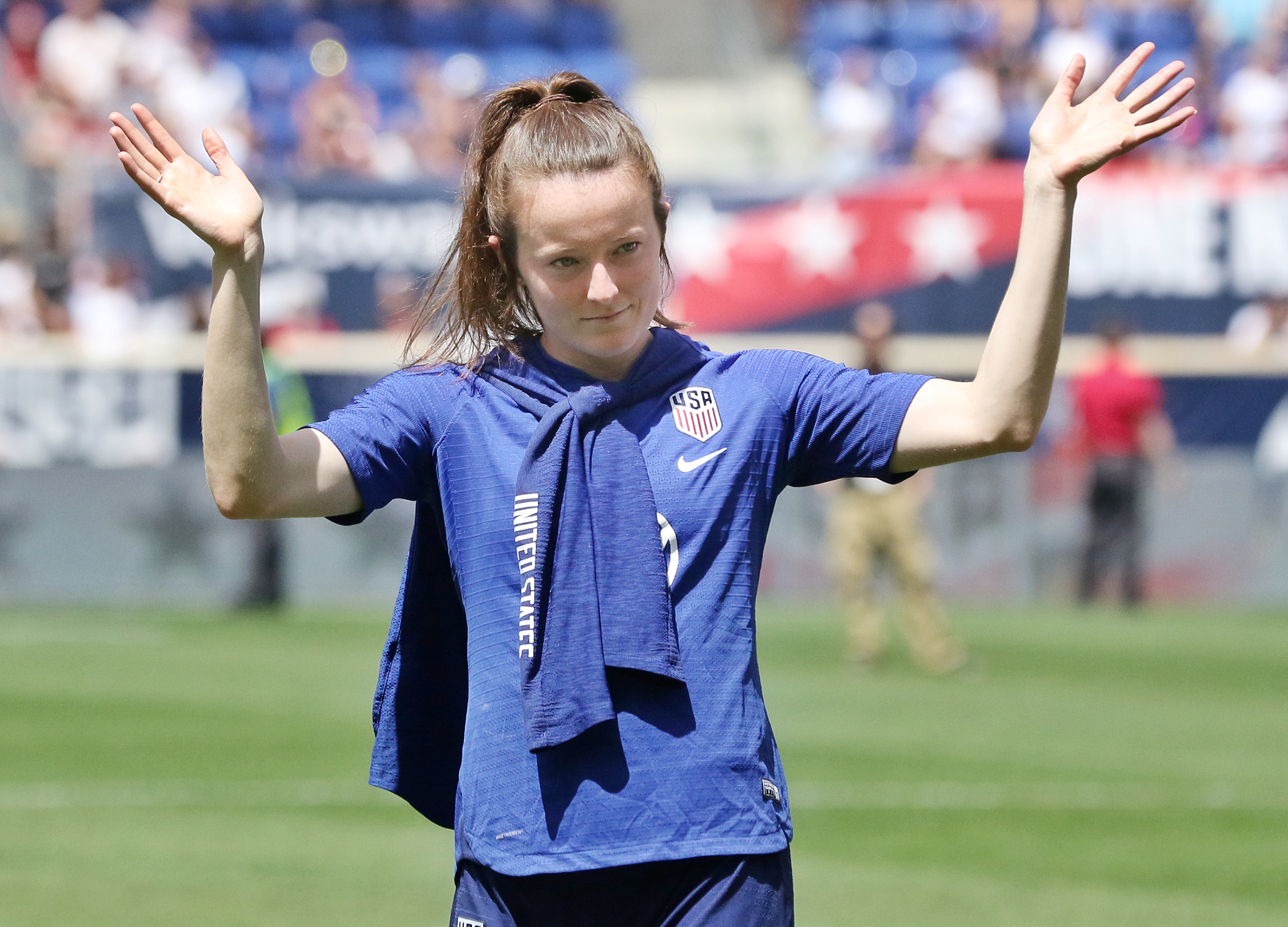
Rose Lavelle, selected first overall in 2017, is Wisconsin's only first-round pick.

All-time Wisconsin Badgers NWSL Draft picks
Draft	Round	Pick	Nat.	Player	Pos.	NWSL team
2015	3	23	(United States)	Cara Walls	FW	Chicago Red Stars
2017	1	1	(United States)	Rose Lavelle	FW	Boston Breakers
2020	2	16	(United States)	Camryn Biegalski	DF	Chicago Red Stars
2021	2	15	(Canada)	Victoria Pickett	MF	Kansas City NWSL
2022	2	26	(United States)	Jordyn Bloomer	GK	Racing Louisville FC
2023	4	46	(United States)	Natalie Viggiano	MF	OL Reign
2024	2	26	(United States)	Emma Jaskaniec	MF	Utah Royals

== Yale Bulldogs ==
All-time Yale Bulldogs NWSL Draft picks
Draft	Round	Pick	Nat.	Player	Pos.	NWSL team
2018	4	39	(United States)	Carlin Hudson	DF	North Carolina Courage
2020	4	35	(United States)	Aerial Chavarin	FW	Chicago Red Stars

== Non-college athletes ==
All-time non-collegiate NWSL Draft picks
Draft	Round	Pick	Nat.	Player	Pos.	NWSL team	School
2023	1	1	(United States)	Alyssa Thompson	FW	Angel City FC	Harvard-Westlake School (Los Angeles)

== See also ==
- NWSL Draft
- List of drafts held by the NWSL
