= 2015 FC Kansas City season =

FC Kansas City
2015 season
- Owner: Brian Budzinski, Chris Likens, Brad Likens, Greg Likens
- Head coach: Vlatko Andonovski
- Stadium: Swope Soccer Village
- NWSL: 3rd
- 2015 NWSL Playoffs: Winners
- Top goalscorer: League: Liz Bogus (3); Shea Groom (3); All: Erika Tymrak (7)
- Highest home attendance: 8,489 (Apr. 12 vs. Sky Blue, at Sporting Park)
- Lowest home attendance: 1,592 (May 23 vs. Chicago)
- Average home league attendance: 3,091
Home colors	Away colors

The 2015 season was FC Kansas City's third season of existence. The team competes in the National Women's Soccer League, the top division of women's soccer in the United States.

== First-team squad ==
Note: Flags indicate national team as defined under FIFA eligibility rules; some limited exceptions apply. Players may hold more than one non-FIFA nationality.

No.	Pos.	Nation	Player
0	GK	USA	Katelyn Rowland
2	FW	USA	Shea Groom
3	MF	USA	Rebecca Moros
4	DF	USA	Becky Sauerbrunn
5	FW	USA	Liz Bogus
6	MF	USA	Jen Buczkowski
7	DF	USA	Meghan Lisenby
8	FW	USA	Amy Rodriguez
9	MF	USA	Heather O'Reilly
10	MF	USA	Kaysie Clark
11	FW	USA	Frances Silva

No.	Pos.	Nation	Player
12	FW	USA	Lauren Holiday
13	DF	USA	Leigh Ann Robinson
14	MF	USA	Yael Averbuch
15	MF	USA	Erika Tymrak
17	DF	USA	Amy LePeilbet
18	GK	USA	Nicole Barnhart
21	MF	USA	Domi Richardson
22	FW	USA	Sarah Hagen
23	FW	USA	Caroline Kastor
25	MF	USA	Mandy Laddish

== Match results ==
Win Draw Loss

=== Preseason ===
March 15, Sun 1	Nebraska Cornhuskers	1–8	FC Kansas City	Lincoln, Nebraska
CDT UTC-5	Johnson 41'	Report	Tymrak 13', 45'; Groom 18'; Hagen 23', 35'; Moros 31'; DeCesare 71'; King 86' (o.g.)	Stadium: Hawks Championship Center

April 1, Wed 2	Kansas Jayhawks	0–2	FC Kansas City	Lawrence, Kansas
CDT UTC-5		Report	Tymrak 3'; Groom 53'	Stadium: Rock Chalk Park

April 4, Sat 3	FC Kansas City	1–0	Iowa State Cyclones	Maryland Heights, Missouri
CDT UTC-5	Tymrak 41'	Report		Stadium: Lou Fusz Soccer Complex
Note: 45-minute match.

April 4, Sat 4	Missouri Tigers	0–4	FC Kansas City	Maryland Heights, Missouri
CDT UTC-5		Report	Tymrak 10'; Groom 18'; Clark 23'; DeCesare 34'	Stadium: Lou Fusz Soccer Complex
Note: 45-minute match.

=== National Women's Soccer League ===
==== Regular season ====
April 12, Sun 1	FC Kansas City	0–1	Sky Blue FC	Kansas City, Kansas
15:00 CDT UTC-5		Report	Nadim 29'; O'Hara (yellow card) 90'	Stadium: Sporting Park; Attendance: 8,849

April 18, Sat 2	Washington Spirit	3–1	FC Kansas City	Germantown, Maryland
18:00 CDT UTC-5	Nairn 9', 65'; Huster (yellow card) 27'; Dunn 46'; Salem (yellow card) 56'	Report	O'Reilly 5'; LePeilbet (yellow card) 65'; Groom (yellow card) 95'	Stadium: Maureen Hendricks Field at Maryland SoccerPlex

April 23, Thu 3	FC Kansas City	1–0	Seattle Reign FC	Kansas City, Missouri
19:00 CDT UTC-5	Rodriguez 49' (Hagen)	Report		Stadium: Swope Soccer Village; Attendance: 2,466

May 2, Sat 4	Houston Dash	0–2	FC Kansas City	Houston
19:30 CDT UTC-5		Report	Bogus 42' (unassisted); Groom 51' (Hagen); Moros (yellow card) 63'	Stadium: BBVA Compass Stadium; Attendance: 4,186; Referee: Margaret Domka

May 8, Fri 5	Western New York Flash	0–1	FC Kansas City	Rochester, New York
18:00 CDT UTC-5		Report	Buczkowski (yellow card) 33'; Bogus 73'	Stadium: Sahlen's Stadium; Attendance: 1,802

May 14, Thu 6	FC Kansas City	0–0	Western New York Flash	Kansas City, Missouri
19:00 CDT UTC-5	Bogus (yellow card) 15'; Hagen (yellow card) 48+'; Groom (yellow card) 57'	Report	Taylor (yellow card) 36'; Edwards (yellow card) 69'; Jones (yellow card) 84'; Williams (yellow card) 86'	Stadium: Swope Soccer Village; Attendance: 1,847

May 23, Sat 7	FC Kansas City	1–2	Chicago Red Stars	Kansas City, Missouri
19:00 CDT UTC-5	LePeilbet 68'	Report	Huerta 33' (DiBernardo); Hemmings 82' (Lomnicki)	Stadium: Swope Soccer Village; Attendance: 1,592

May 30, Sat 8	Boston Breakers	1–0	FC Kansas City	Boston
18:00 CDT UTC-5	K Mewis 51' (Schoepfer)	Report		Stadium: Soldiers Field Soccer Stadium; Attendance: 3,176; Referee: Cedric Adams

June 19, Fri 9	Portland Thorns FC	1–1	FC Kansas City	Portland, Oregon
21:00 CDT UTC-5	Long (yellow card) 44'; Johnson (yellow card) 60'; Zerboni (red card) 70'; Betos 90+5'	Report	Hagen 51' (yellow card) 61'; Groom (yellow card) 71'	Stadium: Providence Park; Attendance: 15,214; Referee: Brandon Artis

June 27, Sat 10	Seattle Reign FC	2–1	FC Kansas City	Seattle
21:30 CDT UTC-5	Yanez 62'; Little 64'; Barnes (yellow card) 67'	Report	Groom 90+1'	Stadium: Memorial Stadium; Attendance: 3,331; Referee: Ekaterina Koroleva

July 3, Fri 11	FC Kansas City	3–0	Washington Spirit	Kansas City, Missouri
19:00 CDT UTC-5	Averbuch 27'; Groom 53'; Bogus 65'	Report	Johnson (yellow card) 26'	Stadium: Swope Soccer Village; Attendance: 2,079; Referee: Tori Penso

July 9, Thu 12	Boston Breakers	2–3	FC Kansas City	Boston
17:00 CDT UTC-5	Marlborough 3'; Mewis 60'	Report	Tymrak 1', 45'; Groom 79'; Silva (yellow card) 90+3'	Stadium: Soldiers Field Soccer Stadium; Attendance: 2,525; Referee: Margaret Domka

July 20, Mon 13	FC Kansas City	1–1	Houston Dash	Kansas City, Missouri
19:00 CDT UTC-5	Pressley 55' (o.g.)	NWSL report	Masar (yellow card) 40'; Lloyd 45'	Stadium: Swope Soccer Village; Attendance: 3,557; Referee: Randall Kelley

July 29, Wed 14	Houston Dash	3–2	FC Kansas City	Houston
19:30 CDT UTC-5	Brush 12' (Ohai); McDonald 17' (Klingenberg); Lloyd 86' (Cross)	Report	Holiday 3' (Rodriguez); Hagen 84'	Stadium: BBVA Compass Stadium; Attendance: 6,425; Referee: Matthew Mercier

August 1, Sat 15	Chicago Red Stars	2–2	FC Kansas City	Lisle, Illinois
19:00 CDT UTC-5	Press 12' (Chalupny); 74' (Chalupny); Erceg (yellow card) 42'	Report	LePeilbet 35' (Holiday); Hagen 87' (O'Reilly)	Stadium: Village of Lisle-Benedictine University Sports Complex; Attendance: 3,477; Referee: Matthew Franz

August 8, Sat 16	FC Kansas City	4–0	Western New York Flash	Kansas City, Missouri
19:00 CDT UTC-5	Robinson 39' (Laddish); Averbuch 69' (unassisted); O'Reilly 84' (Rodriguez); Buczkowski 87' (Silva)	Report	Dahlkemper (yellow card) 65'	Stadium: Swope Soccer Village; Attendance: 3,086

August 12, Wed 17	FC Kansas City	3–0	Portland Thorns FC	Kansas City, Missouri
19:00 CDT UTC-5	Laddish 60' (Robinson); Rodriguez 63' (O'Reilly); Tymrak 76' (Laddish)	Report	Menges (yellow card) 70'	Stadium: Swope Soccer Village; Attendance: 2,982; Referee: Ekaterina Koroleva

August 22, Sat 18	FC Kansas City	3–0	Boston Breakers	Kansas City, Missouri
19:00 CDT UTC-5	Rodriguez 29' (Robinson), 52' (Holiday); Holiday 50' (Rodriguez)	FCKC report NWSL report	Marlborough (yellow card) 81'	Stadium: Swope Soccer Village; Attendance: 2,321; Referee: Brandon Artis

August 27, Thu 19	FC Kansas City	0–0	Washington Spirit	Kansas City, Missouri
19:00 CDT UTC-5		Report	Huster (yellow card) 53'; Okobi (yellow card) 76'; Matheson (yellow card) 79'	Stadium: Swope Soccer Village; Attendance: 2,492

September 2, Wed 20	Sky Blue FC	2–3	FC Kansas City	Piscataway, New Jersey
18:00 CDT UTC-5	Kerr 39' (O'Hara), 72' (Killion)	Report	Hagen 5' (Rodriguez); Rodriguez 42' (O'Reilly), 52' (Moros); Becky Sauerbrunn (yellow card) 92'	Stadium: Yurcak Field; Referee: Levi Rippy

==== Postseason playoff ====
September 13, Sun Semifinal	Chicago Red Stars	0–3	FC Kansas City	Bridgeview, Illinois
12:30 CDT (UTC-05)	Samantha Johnson (yellow card) 68'	Report	Rodriguez 16' (unassisted); Tymrak 21' (O'Reilly); Rodriguez 35' (O'Reilly)	Stadium: Toyota Park; Referee: Karen Abt

October 1, Thu Final	Seattle Reign FC	0–1	FC Kansas City (Champion)	Portland, Oregon
8:30 CDT (UTC-05)		Report	Sauerbrunn (yellow card) 76'; Rodriguez 78' (O'Reilly)	Stadium: Providence Park; Attendance: 13,264; Referee: Katja Koroleva

==== Regular-season standings ====
Pos	Team	Pld	W	D	L	GF	GA	GD	Pts	Qualification
1	Seattle Reign FC	20	13	4	3	41	21	+20	43	NWSL Shield
2	Chicago Red Stars	20	8	9	3	31	22	+9	33	NWSL Playoffs
3	FC Kansas City (C)	20	9	5	6	32	20	+12	32	NWSL Playoffs
4	Washington Spirit	20	8	6	6	31	28	+3	30	NWSL Playoffs
5	Houston Dash	20	6	6	8	21	26	−5	24	
6	Portland Thorns FC	20	6	5	9	27	29	−2	23	
7	Western New York Flash	20	6	5	9	24	34	−10	23	
8	Sky Blue FC	20	5	7	8	22	28	−6	22	
9	Boston Breakers	20	4	3	13	22	43	−21	15	

Source: NWSL
Rules for classification: Tiebreakers
(C) Champions

Results summary

Overall								Home						Away					
Pld	W	D	L	GF	GA	GD	Pts	W	D	L	GF	GA	GD	W	D	L	GF	GA	GD
20	9	5	6	32	20	+12	32	5	3	2	16	4	+12	4	2	4	16	16	0

Last updated: September 5, 2015.
Source: Match reports

Round	1	2	3	4	5	6	7	8	9	10	11	12	13	14	15	16	17	18	19	20
Ground	H	A	H	A	A	H	H	A	A	A	H	A	H	A	A	H	H	H	H	A
Result	L	L	W	W	W	D	L	L	D	L	W	W	D	L	D	W	W	W	D	W
Position (Note: FC Kansas City's standing in the league at the end of match day)	3	8	8	5	2	2	3	4	4	6	4	3	4	5	5	4	4	4	3	3

Updated to match(es) played on September 5, 2015. Source: Match reports
A = Away; H = Home; W = Win; D = Draw; L = Loss

== Squad statistics ==
Source: NWSL

Key to positions: FW – Forward, MF – Midfielder, DF – Defender, GK – Goalkeeper

N	Pos	Player	GP	GS	Min	G	A	WG	Shot	SOG	Cro	CK	Off	Foul	FS	YC	RC
14	MF	Yael Averbuch	18	13	1250	2	0	1	18	9	0	2	0	8	4	0	0
5	FW	Liz Bogus	18	10	882	3	0	2	8	5	3	0	2	7	9	1	0
6	MF	Jen Buczkowski	20	20	1781	1	2	0	8	3	1	0	0	18	7	1	0
10	MF	Kaysie Clark	1	0	6	0	0	0	0	0	0	0	0	0	0	0	0
2	FW	Shea Groom	13	9	788	4	2	1	19	13	2	0	12	10	12	4	0
22	FW	Sarah Hagen	17	11	994	4	2	0	28	12	2	0	14	11	14	2	0
12	FW	Lauren Holiday	9	9	757	2	2	0	29	18	0	65	2	5	6	0	0
23	FW	Caroline Kastor	8	1	161	0	0	0	2	2	2	0	4	1	1	0	0
25	MF	Mandy Laddish	16	13	1180	1	3	1	11	5	0	1	0	10	11	0	0
17	DF	Amy LePeilbet	20	20	1800	2	0	0	4	3	0	1	0	6	13	1	0
7	DF	Meghan Lisenby	5	0	14	0	0	0	1	0	0	0	0	0	2	0	0
3	DF	Becca Moros	20	20	1730	0	1	0	4	2	1	0	1	5	13	1	0
9	MF	Heather O'Reilly	11	11	928	2	3	0	17	12	0	1	7	6	2	0	0
13	DF	Leigh Ann Robinson	20	20	1800	1	3	1	5	3	4	19	1	4	6	0	0
8	FW	Amy Rodriguez	11	11	956	6	4	3	46	16	0	0	24	3	8	0	0
4	DF	Becky Sauerbrunn	11	11	990	0	0	0	3	0	0	0	1	3	6	1	0
11	FW	Frances Silva	15	3	437	0	3	0	6	0	1	0	4	3	8	1	0
15	MF	Erika Tymrak	19	18	1546	3	1	0	29	16	3	19	4	15	34	0	0

N	Pos	Goal keeper	GP	GS	Min	W	L	T	Shot	SOG	Sav	GA	GA/G	Pen	PKF	SO
18	GK	Nicole Barnhart	17	17	1530	8	6	3	179	70	54	16	.941	0	0	8
0	GK	Katelyn Rowland	3	3	270	1	0	2	29	17	13	4	1.333	0	0	1
