= Kaysie Clark =

American former soccer player

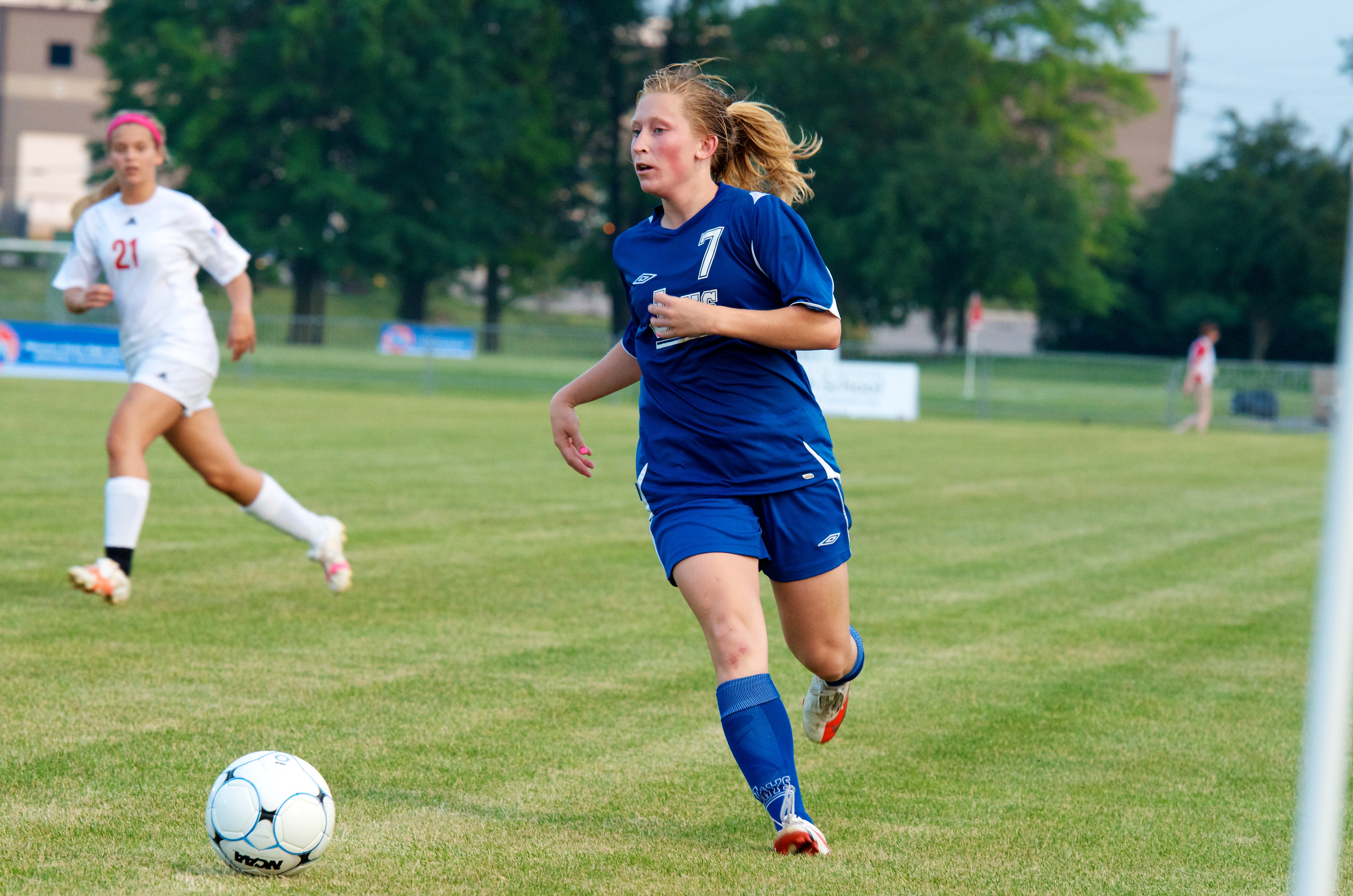

Personal information
- Full name: Kaysie Brooke Clark
- Date of birth: January 31, 1993 (age 33)
- Place of birth: Liberty, Missouri, United States
- Height: 1.65 m (5 ft 5 in)
- Position: Midfielder

College career
Years	Team	Apps	(Gls)
2011–2014	Missouri Tigers		

Senior career*
Years	Team	Apps	(Gls)
2015	FC Kansas City	1	(0)

International career
2010	United States U17	5	(2)
- * Club domestic league appearances and goals

Kaysie Brooke Clark (born January 31, 1993) is an American former soccer player who played for FC Kansas City in the National Women's Soccer League.

== Club career ==
After playing collegiately for the University of Missouri, Clark was draft by FC Kansas City with the 35th pick in the 2015 NWSL College Draft. She made one appearance for FCKC in 2015, as the team went on to win the 2015 NWSL Championship. Clark did not join the team for the 2016 season, as she chose to pursue other opportunities.

== Career statistics ==
Appearances and goals by club, season and competition
Club	Season	League			Playoffs (Note: Includes NWSL playoffs)		Total	
Club	Season	Division	Apps	Goals	Apps	Goals	Apps	Goals
FC Kansas City	2015	NWSL	1	0	0	0	1	0
Career total			1	0	0	0	1	0

== Honors ==
FC Kansas City

- National Women's Soccer League: 2015
