= Kim DeCesare =

American soccer player and coach

Kim DeCesare (van Bennekom)
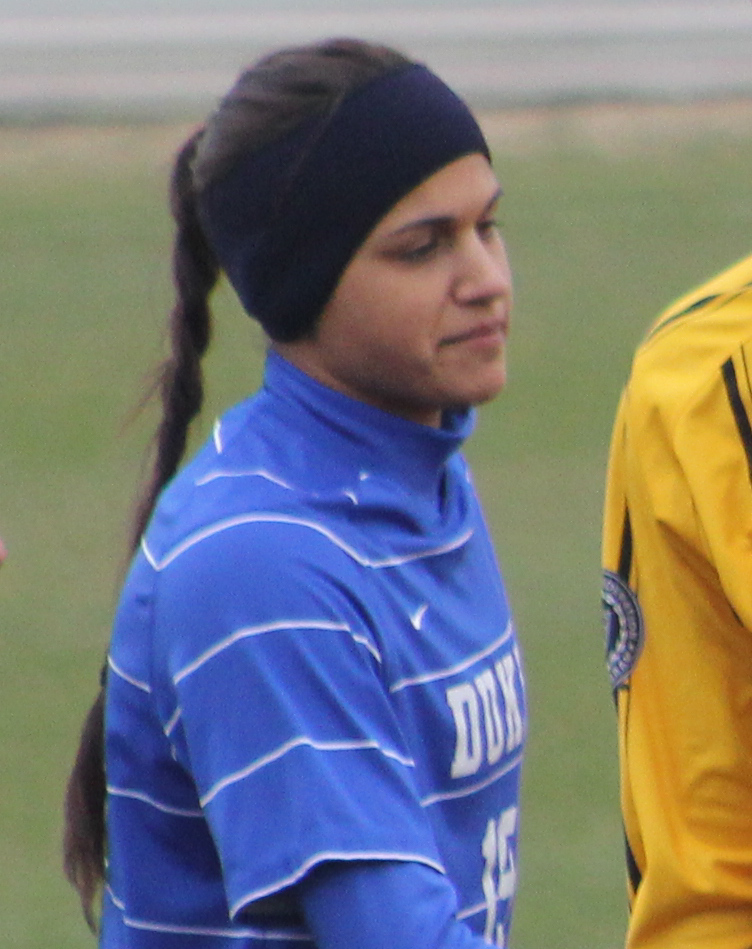

Personal information
- Full name: Kimberly Mary DeCesare
- Date of birth: August 11, 1991 (age 35)
- Place of birth: Massapequa Park, New York, U.S.
- Height: 5 ft 10 in (1.78 m)
- Position: Midfielder

College career
Years	Team	Apps	(Gls)
2009–2013	Duke Blue Devils		

Senior career*
Years	Team	Apps	(Gls)
2014	Boston Breakers	1	(0)
2014	Eskilstuna United DFF	6	(2)
2015–2017	Sky Blue FC	15	(0)
2017–2018	PSV Vrouwen	9	(1)
- * Club domestic league appearances and goals

KVB Soccer Consulting

Kimberly Mary DeCesare (born August 11, 1991) is an American soccer player and coach. She played soccer for Duke University as a forward, before joining Eskilstuna United DFF in Sweden. Returning to the United States she played three seasons with Sky Blue FC, making 15 appearances in the National Women's Soccer League before asking to be released on July 19, 2017. DeCesare then moved to PSV Vrouwen in the Netherlands, making nine appearances. Following an injury, she decided to retire from playing and become a coach. In August of 2025, DeCesare started a college soccer recruiting consulting business, KVB Soccer Consulting (kvbsoccer.com), to help high school student-athletes and their families navigate the ever changing landscape of college soccer recruiting.
