= 2020 Utah Royals FC season =

Utah Royals FC
2020 season
- Owner: Dell Loy Hansen
- Head coach: Amy LePeilbet (interim)
- Stadium: Rio Tinto Stadium
- NWSL
- 2020 NWSL Challenge Cup: Quarter-finals
Home colors	Away colors

The 2020 Utah Royals FC season marks the team's third year and final season of existence in the National Women's Soccer League (NWSL), the top division of the American soccer pyramid. After this season, the team folded and transferred players and coaches to the new Kansas City NWSL, now known as the Kansas City Current.

On January 6, 2020 the team mutually parted ways with head coach Laura Harvey so she could take a position with U.S Soccer as the head coach for the U-20 Women's National Team.

== Competitions ==
Due to the COVID-19 pandemic the NWSL did not hold a regular season as originally scheduled. The season was replaced by the 2020 NWSL Challenge Cup in July and the Fall Series in September and October.

=== 2020 NWSL Challenge Cup ===
The Royals began their Challenge Cup against the Houston Dash on June 30. They were without forward Christen Press who opted out of the tournament and Desiree Scott who withdrew from the tournament for personal reasons.

Pos	Team	Pld	W	D	L	GF	GA	GD	Pts
1	North Carolina Courage	4	4	0	0	7	1	+6	12
2	Washington Spirit	4	2	1	1	4	4	0	7
3	OL Reign	4	1	2	1	1	2	−1	5
4	Houston Dash	4	1	1	2	5	6	−1	4
5	Utah Royals FC (H)	4	1	1	2	4	5	−1	4
6	Chicago Red Stars	4	1	1	2	2	3	−1	4 (Note: Chicago Red Stars won the tiebreaker against Sky Blue FC on fewer yellow cards (1 to 4).)
7	Sky Blue FC	4	1	1	2	2	3	−1	4
8	Portland Thorns FC	4	0	3	1	2	3	−1	3

Source: NWSL
Rules for classification: Tiebreakers
(H) Host

==== Challenge Cup match results ====
Preliminary round

June 30, 2020 1	Houston Dash	3–3	Utah Royals FC	Herriman, Utah
10:30	Daly 45+1', 47'; Groom 67'	Report	Matheson 35'; Boquete 82'; King 89'	Stadium: Zions Bank Stadium; Referee: Karen Abt

July 4, 2020 2	Utah Royals FC	1–0	Sky Blue FC	Herriman, Utah
10:30	Rodriguez 41'	Report		Stadium: Zions Bank Stadium; Referee: Katja Koroleva

July 8, 2020 3	Utah Royals FC	0–1	OL Reign	Herriman, Utah
10:30		Report	Balcer 90+1'	Stadium: Zions Bank Stadium; Referee: Danielle Chesky

July 12, 2020 4	Chicago Red Stars	1–0	Utah Royals FC	Herriman, Utah
20:00	Short 85'	Report		Stadium: Zions Bank Stadium; Referee: Michael Radchuk

Knockout round

July 17, 2020 Quarter-final	Houston Dash	0–0 (3–2 p)	Utah Royals FC	Zions Bank Stadium; Herriman, Utah
20:00		Report
	Penalties
	Schmidt (penalty scored); Nairn (penalty scored); Daly (penalty scored); Visalli (penalty missed)		(penalty missed) Rodriguez; (penalty scored) LaBonta; (penalty missed) Corsie; (penalty scored) King; (penalty missed) Boquete

=== Fall Series ===
The Royals would be without several players for the NWSL Fall Series. Forward Christen Press signed with Manchester United. Rachel Corsie went on loan to Birmingham City and Gunnhildur Jónsdóttir was loaned to Valur. Kelley O'Hara, Desiree Scott and Diana Matheson all opted out of the Fall Series.

Head Coach Craig Harrington and assistant coach Louis Lancaster were placed on administrative leave prior to the first game of the Fall Series, Amy LePeilbet was named interim head coach.

Pos	Team	Pld	W	D	L	GF	GA	GD	Pts	Qualification
1	Portland Thorns FC (C)	4	3	1	0	10	3	+7	10	Community Shield
2	Houston Dash	4	3	0	1	12	7	+5	9	Runners-up
3	Washington Spirit	4	2	1	1	5	4	+1	7	Third place
4	Sky Blue FC	4	2	0	2	6	7	−1	6	
5	North Carolina Courage	4	1	2	1	8	10	−2	5	
6	Chicago Red Stars	4	1	1	2	7	7	0	4	
7	OL Reign	4	1	1	2	6	8	−2	4	
8	Orlando Pride	4	0	2	2	5	8	−3	2	
9	Utah Royals FC	4	0	2	2	3	8	−5	2	

Source: NWSL
Rules for classification: Tiebreakers
(C) Champions

==== Fall Series match results ====
September 20, 2020 1	Portland Thorns FC	3–0	Utah Royals FC	Portland, Oregon
	Charley 35'; Smith 72'; Horan 81'			Stadium: Providence Park

September 26, 2020 2	Utah Royals FC	2–2	OL Reign	Sandy, Utah
	Diallo 9'; King 22'		Balcer 23'; White 28'	Stadium: Rio Tinto Stadium

October 3, 2020 3	Utah Royals FC	1–1	Portland Thorns FC	Sandy, Utah
	Rodriguez 9'		Sinclair 59'	Stadium: Rio Tinto Stadium

October 17, 2020 4	OL Reign	2–0	Utah Royals FC	Tacoma, Washington
	Huerta 24'; Pruitt 51'			Stadium: Cheney Stadium

== Club ==
=== Roster ===
- Age calculated as of the start of the 2020 Fall Series.

As of September 11, 2020

No.	Name	Nationality	Positions	Date of birth (age)	Signed from	Year with club (year signed)
1	Abby Smith	United States	GK	October 4, 1993 (aged 26)	(United States) Boston Breakers	3 (2018)
2	Rachel Corsie	Scotland	DF	August 17, 1989 (aged 31)	(United States) Seattle Reign	3 (2018)
3	Tziarra King	United States	FW	August 24, 1998 (aged 22)	(United States) North Carolina State University	1 (2020)
5	Kelley O'Hara	United States	DF	August 4, 1988 (aged 32)	(United States) Sky Blue FC	3 (2018)
6	Katie Bowen	New Zealand	DF	April 15, 1994 (aged 26)	(United States) FC Kansas City	3 (2018)
7	Elizabeth Ball	United States	DF	October 20, 1995 (aged 24)	(United States) Portland Thorns	1 (2020)
8	Amy Rodriguez	United States	FW	February 17, 1987 (aged 33)	(United States) FC Kansas City	3 (2018)
9	Lo'eau LaBonta	United States	MF	March 18, 1993 (aged 27)	(United States) FC Kansas City	3 (2018)
10	Diana Matheson	Canada	MF	April 6, 1984 (aged 36)	(United States) Seattle Reign FC	3 (2018)
11	Desiree Scott	Canada	MF	July 31, 1987 (aged 33)	(United States) FC Kansas City	3 (2018)
12	Taylor Lytle	United States	MF	March 31, 1989 (aged 31)	(United States) Sky Blue FC	3 (2018)
13	Chestley Strother	United States	MF	June 13, 1994 (aged 26)	(Sweden) Sundsvalls DFF	1 (2020)
14	Gaby Vincent	United States	DF	December 7, 1997 (aged 22)	(United States) University of Louisville	2 (2019)
17	Arielle Ship	United States	FW	May 2, 1995 (aged 25)	(United States) Washington Spirit	1 (2020)
18	Nicole Barnhart	United States	GK	October 10, 1981 (aged 38)	(United States) FC Kansas City	3 (2018)
19	Michelle Maemone	United States	DF	March 18, 1997 (aged 23)	(United States) Pepperdine University	2 (2019)
20	Mallory Weber	United States	FW	April 4, 1994 (aged 26)	(United States) Portland Thorns	2 (2019)
21	Verónica Boquete	Spain	FW	April 9, 1987 (aged 33)	(China) Beijing BG Phoenix	2 (2019)
22	Madeline Nolf	United States	DF	March 29, 1996 (aged 24)	(United States) Penn State University	2 (2019)
24	Taylor Leach	United States	DF	January 19, 1992 (aged 28)	(Sweden) Kopparbergs/Göteborg FC	1 (2020)
25	Brittany Ratcliffe	United States	FW	February 7, 1994 (aged 26)	(United States) FC Kansas City	3 (2018)
29	Kate Del Fava	United States	FW	July 23, 1998 (aged 22)	(United States) Illinois State University	1 (2020)
38	Aminata Diallo	France	MF	April 3, 1995 (aged 25)	(France) Paris Saint-Germain	1 (2020)
42	Raisa Strom-Okimoto	United States	FW	October 25, 1997 (aged 22)	(United States) University of Hawaii	2 (2019)
61	Melissa Lowder	United States	GK		(United States) Santa Clara University	2 (2019)
66	Gunnhildur Jónsdóttir	Iceland	MF	September 28, 1988 (aged 31)	(Norway) Vålerenga	3 (2018)
	Michele Vasconcelos	United States	FW	May 11, 1994 (aged 26)	(United States) Chicago Red Stars	1 (2020)

== Player transactions ==
As of September 11, 2020

=== Transfers in ===
Date	Player	Positions played	Previous club	Fee/notes	Ref.
11/05/19	(United States) Kyra Carusa	FW	(United States) Sky Blue FC	Re-Entry Wire	
11/05/19	(United States) Cali Farquharson	FW	(United States) Washington Spirit	Re-Entry Wire	
11/05/19	(United States) Arielle Ship	FW	(United States) Washington Spirit	Re-Entry Wire	
01/06/20	(United States) Taylor Leach	DF	(Sweden) Kopparbergs/Göteborg FC	Signed	
01/07/20	(United States) Chestley Strother	MF	(Sweden) Sundsvalls DFF	Signed	
03/03/20	(United States) Elizabeth Ball	DF	(United States) Portland Thorns	Acquired in a trade with the Portland Thorns in exchange for Becky Sauerbrunn and allocation money.	
03/11/20	(France) Aminata Diallo	MF	(France) Paris Saint-Germain	Signed on loan from Paris Saint-Germain.	
09/10/20	(United States) Michele Vasconcelos	FW	(United States) Chicago Red Stars	Acquired in a trade with the Chicago Red Stars in exchange for $55,000 in allocation money.	

=== Transfers out ===
Date	Player	Positions played	Destination club	Fee/notes	Ref.
12/12/19	(United States) Cali Farquharson	FW	(Sweden) KIF Örebro DFF	Waived	
12/19/19	(United States) Makenzy Doniak	FW	(United States) Chicago Red Stars	Traded to the Chicago Red Stars, in exchange for Chicago's second round pick in the 2021 NWSL College Draft	
01/06/20	(United States) Erika Tymrak	MF		Retired	
01/08/20	(United States) Katie Stengel	FW	(United States) Houston Dash	Traded to the Houston Dash along with Utah's third round pick in the 2020 College Draft in exchange for Houston's second round pick in the 2020 and 2021 NWSL College Drafts	
02/03/20	(United States) Mandy Laddish	MF		Retired	
02/03/20	(United States) Becca Moros	DF		Waived	
02/19/20	(United States) Sydney Miramontez	DF		Retired	
03/03/20	(United States) Becky Sauerbrunn	DF	(United States) Portland Thorns	Traded to the Portland Thorns in exchange for Elizabeth Ball and allocation money.	
09/09/20	(United States) Christen Press	FW	(England) Manchester United	Signed with Manchester United in the FA Women's Super League, Utah retains her rights in the NWSL.	

=== 2020 NWSL College Draft ===
Source: National Women's Soccer League

Round	Pick	Nat.	Player	Pos.	Previous Team
Round 1	8	(United States)	Tziarra King	F	North Carolina State University
Round 2	12	(United States)	Kate Del Fava	M	Illinois State University
Round 4	31	(United States)	Cyera Hintzen	F	University of Texas
