= 2019 Utah Royals FC season =

Utah Royals FC
2019 season
- Owner: Dell Loy Hansen
- Head Coach: Laura Harvey
- Stadium: Rio Tinto Stadium
- NWSL: 5th
- Top goalscorer: Amy Rodriguez (9)
- Highest home attendance: 18,015 vs Washington Spirit, April 20th, 2019
- Lowest home attendance: 5,777 vs Sky Blue, June 15th, 2019
- Average home league attendance: 10,774
Home colors	Away colors

The 2019 Utah Royals FC season marks the team's second year of existence and its second season in the National Women's Soccer League (NWSL), the top division of the American soccer pyramid.

In an effort to improve on the team's 5th-place finish in 2018, the Royals signed former Spanish international and Spain's all-time leading scorer Vero Boquete for the 2019 season.

Utah encountered numerous injury problems to start the season as both Brittany Ratcliffe and Taylor Lytle suffered season ending injuries before the season began. Canadian international Diana Matheson suffered a toe injury with the Canadian National Team which would require surgery, this injury would also force her to miss the World Cup. To help deal with these absences, Utah claimed Mallory Weber off waivers from the Portland Thorns FC.

Six members of the Royals would miss games due to their participation at the 2019 FIFA Women's World Cup. Becky Sauerbrunn, Kelley O'Hara and Christen Press for the United States, Desiree Scott for Canada, Katie Bowen for New Zealand and Rachel Corsie for Scotland.

The Royals would lose another player at the end of June as defender Samantha Johnson announced her retirement from professional soccer.

Defender Kelley O'Hara suffered an ankle injury during the first USWNT victory tour match on August 3, she would miss the remainer of Utah's season due to this injury.

On August 14, Royals forward Christen Press was named NWSL Player of the Week for Week 17, this was the first time a player on the Utah Royals had received this award. Press was also named Player of the Month for August, which was also a first for the club.

The Royals were eliminated from playoff contention on September 28 after their fourth consecutive loss.

Utah defender Becky Sauerbrunn was named 2019 NWSL Defender of the Year, this was her fourth time winning the award, as she had previously won it three times while playing for FC Kansas City.

== Competitions ==
=== Pre Season ===
March 20, 2019	Long Beach State	0–4	Utah Royals FC	Long Beach, California
19:00			Jónsdóttir 71', 72', 75'; Strom-Okimito 86'	Stadium: George Allen Field

March 23, 2019	USC Trojans	v	Utah Royals FC	Long Beach, California
12:15		Report		Stadium: George Allen Field

=== NWSL Regular Season ===
==== Overall Table ====
Pos	Team	Pld	W	D	L	GF	GA	GD	Pts	Qualification
1	North Carolina Courage (C)	24	15	4	5	54	23	+31	49	NWSL Shield
2	Chicago Red Stars	24	14	2	8	41	28	+13	44	NWSL Playoffs
3	Portland Thorns FC	24	11	7	6	40	31	+9	40	NWSL Playoffs
4	Reign FC	24	10	8	6	27	27	0	38	NWSL Playoffs
5	Washington Spirit	24	9	7	8	30	25	+5	34	
6	Utah Royals FC	24	10	4	10	25	25	0	34	
7	Houston Dash	24	7	5	12	21	36	−15	26	
8	Sky Blue FC	24	5	5	14	20	34	−14	20	
9	Orlando Pride	24	4	4	16	24	53	−29	16	

Source: NWSL
Rules for classification: Tiebreakers
(C) Champions

==== Results summary ====
Overall								Home						Away					
Pld	Pts	W	L	T	GF	GA	GD	W	L	T	GF	GA	GD	W	L	T	GF	GA	GD
24	34	10	10	4	25	25	0	7	4	1	15	12	+3	3	6	3	10	13	−3

Last updated: October 12, 2019
Source: NWSL Results
Pld = Matches played; Pts = Points; W = Matches won; T = Matches tied; L = Matches lost; GF = Goals for; GA = Goals against; GD = Goal difference

==== Results by round ====
Round	1	2	3	4	5	6	7	8	9	10	11	12	13	14	15	16	17	18	19	20	21	22	23	24
Ground	H	A	H	H	A	H	A	H	A	H	A	H	H	A	H	A	A	A	H	A	A	H	A	H
Result	W	W	W	L	D	W	L	W	D	L	L	D	L	L	W	W	W	D	W	L	L	L	L	W
Position (Note: UTA's position at the end of the matchweek not the match itself.)	4	2	1	2	2	1	3	2	2	4	5	6	7	7	6	5	4	4	4	4	4	5	5	6

Source: NWSLsoccer.com
A = Away; H = Home; W = Win; D = Draw; L = Loss

==== Match results ====
April 20, 2019 1	Utah Royals FC	1–0	Washington Spirit	Sandy, Utah
7:00 pm MST	Labonta 10'	Report	Matthews (yellow card) 26'	Stadium: Rio Tinto Stadium; Attendance: 18,015

April 27, 2019 2	Orlando Pride	0–1	Utah Royals FC	Orlando, Florida
7:00 pm MST	Kennedy (yellow card) 40'; Pickett (yellow card) 90'	Report	Press 19'; Bowen (yellow card) 87'	Stadium: Orlando City Stadium; Attendance: 4,640; Referee: Jon Freemon

May 3, 2019 3	Utah Royals FC	1–0	Chicago Red Stars	Sandy, Utah
7:00 pm MST	Maemone (yellow card) 66' Rodriguez 83'	Report	K.Johnson (red card) 42' Stanton (yellow card) 66' Kerr (yellow card) 80'	Stadium: Rio Tinto Stadium; Attendance: 16,556

May 11, 2019 4	Utah Royals FC	1–2	Houston Dash	Sandy, Utah
7:00 pm MST	Rodriguez 29'; S. Johnson (yellow card) 44'; Corsie (yellow card) 69'	Report	Daly 42' 50'; Hanson (yellow card) 72'; Nairn (yellow card) 83'	Stadium: Rio Tinto Stadium; Attendance: 10,138

May 19, 2019 5	North Carolina Courage	1–1	Utah Royals FC	Cary, North Carolina
3:00 pm MST	Eddy 78'	Report	Rodriguez 7'; Rodriguez (yellow card) 40'	Stadium: Sahlen's Stadium at WakeMed Soccer Park; Attendance: 4,821

May 25, 2019 6	Utah Royals FC	2–0	Orlando Pride	Sandy, Utah
6:00 pm MST	Rodriguez 31' (pen.); Doniak 89'	Box	Weatherholt (yellow card) 64'; Callahan (yellow card) 68'	Stadium: Rio Tinto Stadium; Attendance: 7,345; Referee: Karen Abt

June 1, 2019 7	Washington Spirit	2–0	Utah Royals FC	Boyds, Maryland
7:00 pm MST	Hatch 23' Bailey 70'	Box		Stadium: Maryland SoccerPlex; Referee: 4,575

June 15, 2019 8	Utah Royals FC	1–0	Sky Blue FC	Sandy, Utah
8:00 pm MST	Rodriguez 16'; Tymrak (yellow card) 90+2'	Box	Skroski (yellow card) 84'	Stadium: Rio Tinto Stadium; Attendance: 5,777

June 21, 2019 9	Portland Thorns FC	0–0	Utah Royals FC	Portland, Oregon
8:00 pm MST	LaBonta (yellow card) 56'	Box	Boureille (yellow card) 30'	Stadium: Providence Park; Attendance: 15,581

June 28, 2019 10	Utah Royals FC	0–2	Reign FC	Sandy, Utah
8:00 pm MST	Stengel (yellow card) 84'	Box; Report	Fishlock 30'; Onumonu 35'; Groom (yellow card) 49'	Stadium: Rio Tinto Stadium; Attendance: 6,910

July 12, 2019 11	Sky Blue FC	1–0	Utah Royals FC	Piscataway, New Jersey
7:00 pm MST	James (yellow card) 42'; Flores (yellow card) 77'; Pierre-Louis (yellow card) 88'; Hoy 90+2'	Report		Stadium: Yurcak Field; Attendance: 1,842

July 19, 2019 12	Utah Royals FC	2–2	Portland Thorns FC	Sandy, Utah
8:00 pm MST	Press 43'; Corsie 90'	Report	Sinclair 9'; Foord (yellow card) 83'; Sauerbrunn 87' (o.g)	Stadium: Rio Tinto Stadium; Attendance: 15,931

July 27, 2019 13	Utah Royals FC	1–2	North Carolina Courage	Sandy, Utah
8:00 pm MST	Press 13'	Report	Hamilton 34'; McDonald 54'	Stadium: Rio Tinto Stadium; Attendance: 10,545

August 3, 2019 14	Chicago Red Stars	2–0	Utah Royals FC	Bridgeview, Illinois
7:00 pm MST	Kerr 5'; Elby 85'	Report	Jónsdóttir (yellow card) 74'	Stadium: Toyota Park; Attendance: 4,335

August 7, 2019 15	Utah Royals FC	3–0	Sky Blue FC	Sandy, Utah
8:00 pm MST	Press 27', 29'; Rodriguez 28'	Report	Hoy (yellow card) 60'; Wright (yellow card) 60'	Stadium: Rio Tinto Stadium; Attendance: 7,715

August 11, 2019 16	Reign FC	1–3	Utah Royals FC	Tacoma, Washington
7:00 pm MST	Long (yellow card) 14'; Groom 41'; Celia (yellow card) 68'	Report	Stengel 3'; LaBonta 59'; Rodriguez 67'; Weber (yellow card) 81'	Stadium: Cheney Stadium; Attendance: 5,939

August 17, 2019 17	Orlando Pride	0–2	Utah Royals FC	Orlando, Florida
7:00 pm MST	Edmonds (yellow card) 63'	Report	Press 60'; Rodriguez 77'	Stadium: Orlando City Stadium; Attendance: 5,279

August 21, 2019 18	Washington Spirit	0–0	Utah Royals FC	Boyds, Maryland
7:00 pm MST	Kellond-Knight (yellow card) 5'	Report	Press (yellow card) 50'	Stadium: Maryland SoccerPlex; Attendance: 2,430

September 6, 2019 19	Utah Royals FC	1–0	Portland Thorns FC	Sandy, Utah
7:30 pm MST	Sauerbrunn 36'; Corsie (yellow card) 65'; Rodriguez (yellow card) 78'	Report	Sonnett (yellow card) 61' (yellow-red card) 77'; Horan (yellow card) 80'	Stadium: Rio Tinto Stadium; Attendance: 10,897

September 13, 2019 20	Houston Dash	2–1	Utah Royals FC	Houston, Texas
7:00 pm MST	Huerta 27', 62'; Nairn (yellow card) 87'	Report	Jónsdóttir 75'	Stadium: BBVA Compass Stadium; Attendance: 4,538

September 21, 2019 21	Utah Royals FC	0–3	North Carolina Courage	Sandy, Utah
7:00 pm MST		Report	Mewis 30' (pen.); O'Sullivan (yellow card) 35'; Hinkle 65'; Debinha 70'	Stadium: Rio Tinto Stadium; Attendance: 9,946

September 25, 2019 22	Reign FC	2–1	Utah Royals FC	Tacoma, Washington
7:00 pm MST	Balcer 40'; McNabb (yellow card) 77'; Taylor 86'	Box; Report	Stengel 67'	Stadium: Cheney Stadium; Attendance: 5,015
Note: Game was rescheduled from September 18th due to unplayable field conditions

September 28, 2019 23	Chicago Red Stars	2–1	Utah Royals FC	Bridgeview, Illinois
7:00 pm MST	DiBernardo 40'; Short (yellow card) 67'; Nagasato 85'	Report	Press 42'	Stadium: Toyota Park; Attendance: 4,839

October 12, 2019 24	Utah Royals FC	2-1	Houston Dash	Sandy, Utah
7:30 pm MST	Press 3'; Rodriguez 23'; Weber (yellow card) 70'	Report	Schmidt (yellow card) 26'; Romero (yellow card) 29'; Daly (yellow card) 70'; Mewis 78'	Stadium: Rio Tinto Stadium; Attendance: 9,513

== Stats ==
As of October 12, 2019

Goals
Rank	Player	Nation	Goals
1	Amy Rodriguez	(United States)	9
2	Christen Press	(United States)	8
3	Lo'eau LaBonta	(United States)	2
3	Katie Stengel	(United States)	2
5	Makenzy Doniak	(United States)	1
5	Rachel Corsie	(Scotland)	1
5	Becky Sauerbrunn	(United States)	1
5	Gunnhildur Jónsdóttir	(Iceland)	1

Assists
Rank	Player	Nation	Assists
1	Vero Boquete	(Spain)	6
2	Gunnhildur Jónsdóttir	(Iceland)	4
3	Lo'eau LaBonta	(United States)	2
3	Christen Press	(United States)	2
5	Michelle Maemone	(United States)	1
5	Kelley O'Hara	(United States)	1
5	Mallory Weber	(United States)	1
5	Erika Tymrak	(United States)	1
5	Katie Stengel	(United States)	1

Shutouts
Rank	Player	Nation	Shutouts
1	Nicole Barnhart	(United States)	10

== Honors and awards ==
As of October 24, 2019.

=== NWSL awards ===
==== Best XI ====
Player	Position	Ref
(United States) Becky Sauerbrunn	Defender	
(United States) Christen Press	Forward	

==== Second XI ====
Player	Position	Ref
(United States) Kelley O'Hara	Defender	

=== NWSL Monthly Awards ===
==== NWSL Player of the Month ====
Month	Result	Player	Ref.
August	Won	(United States) Christen Press	

==== NWSL Team of the Month ====
Month	Goalkeeper	Defenders	Midfielders	Forwards	Ref
April		(United States) Becky Sauerbrunn		(United States) Christen Press	
May		(Scotland) Rachel Corsie	(Spain) Vero Boquete	(United States) Amy Rodriguez	
June				(United States) Amy Rodriguez	
August			(United States) Lo'eau LaBonta	(United States) Christen Press (United States) Amy Rodriguez	

=== NWSL Weekly Awards ===
==== NWSL Player of the Week ====
Week	Result	Player	Ref.
17	Won	(United States) Christen Press	

==== NWSL Goal of the Week ====
Week	Result	Player	Ref.
2	Nominated	(United States) Lo'Eau LaBonta	
3	Nominated	(United States) Christen Press	
4	Nominated	(United States) Amy Rodriguez	
5	Nominated	(United States) Amy Rodriguez	
6	Nominated	(United States) Amy Rodriguez	
7	Nominated	(United States) Makenzy Doniak	
9	Won	(United States) Amy Rodriguez	
14	Won	(United States) Christen Press	
15	Won	(United States) Christen Press	
17	Won	(United States) Amy Rodriguez	
18	Won	(United States) Christen Press	
21	Won	(United States) Becky Sauerbrunn	
25	Nominated	(United States) Amy Rodriguez	

==== NWSL Save of the Week ====
Week	Result	Player	Ref.
3	Nominated	(United States) Nicole Barnhart	
4	Nominated	(United States) Nicole Barnhart	
7	Nominated	(United States) Nicole Barnhart	
10	Nominated	(United States) Nicole Barnhart	
13	Nominated	(United States) Nicole Barnhart	
16	Nominated	(United States) Nicole Barnhart	
21	Won	(United States) Nicole Barnhart	
24	Nominated	(United States) Nicole Barnhart	

== Club ==
=== Roster ===
- Age calculated as of the start of the 2019 season.

As of August 5, 2019

No.	Name	Nationality	Positions	Date of birth (age)	Signed from	Year with club (year signed)
1	Abby Smith	United States	GK	October 4, 1993 (aged 25)	(United States) Boston Breakers	2 (2018)
2	Rachel Corsie	Scotland	DF	August 17, 1989 (aged 29)	(United States) Seattle Reign	2 (2018)
3	Rebecca Moros	United States	DF	May 6, 1985 (aged 33)	(United States) FC Kansas City	2 (2018)
4	Becky Sauerbrunn	United States	DF	June 6, 1985 (aged 33)	(United States) FC Kansas City	2 (2018)
5	Kelley O'Hara	United States	DF	August 4, 1988 (aged 30)	(United States) Sky Blue FC	2 (2018)
6	Katie Bowen	New Zealand	DF	April 15, 1994 (aged 24)	(United States) FC Kansas City	2 (2018)
7	Mandy Laddish	United States	MF	May 13, 1992 (aged 26)	(United States) FC Kansas City	2 (2018)
8	Amy Rodriguez	United States	FW	February 17, 1987 (aged 32)	(United States) FC Kansas City	2 (2018)
9	Lo'eau LaBonta	United States	MF	March 18, 1993 (aged 26)	(United States) FC Kansas City	2 (2018)
10	Diana Matheson	Canada	MF	April 6, 1984 (aged 35)	(United States) Seattle Reign FC	2 (2018)
11	Desiree Scott	Canada	MF	July 31, 1987 (aged 31)	(United States) FC Kansas City	2 (2018)
12	Taylor Lytle	United States	MF	March 31, 1989 (aged 30)	(United States) Sky Blue FC	2 (2018)
13	Makenzy Doniak	United States	FW	February 25, 1994 (aged 25)	(United States) North Carolina Courage	2 (2018)
14	Gaby Vincent	United States	DF	December 7, 1997 (aged 21)	(United States) University of Louisville	1 (2019)
15	Erika Tymrak	United States	MF	August 7, 1991 (aged 27)	(United States) FC Kansas City	2 (2018)
17	Sydney Miramontez	United States	DF	October 11, 1994 (aged 24)	(United States) FC Kansas City	2 (2018)
18	Nicole Barnhart	United States	GK	October 10, 1981 (aged 37)	(United States) FC Kansas City	2 (2018)
19	Michelle Maemone	United States	DF	March 18, 1997 (aged 22)	(United States) Pepperdine University	1 (2019)
20	Mallory Weber	United States	FW	April 4, 1994 (aged 25)	(United States) Portland Thorns FC	1 (2019)
21	Verónica Boquete	Spain	FW	April 9, 1987 (aged 32)	(China) Beijing BG Phoenix	1 (2019)
22	Madeline Nolf	United States	DF	March 29, 1996 (aged 23)	(United States) Penn State University	1 (2019)
23	Christen Press	United States	FW	December 29, 1988 (aged 30)	(Sweden) Kopparbergs/Göteborg FC	2 (2018)
24	Katie Stengel	United States	FW	February 29, 1992 (aged 27)	(United States) Boston Breakers	2 (2018)
25	Brittany Ratcliffe	United States	FW	February 7, 1994 (aged 25)	(United States) FC Kansas City	2 (2018)
42	Raisa Strom-Okimoto	United States	FW		(United States) University of Hawaii	1 (2019)
66	Gunnhildur Jónsdóttir	Iceland	MF	September 28, 1988 (aged 30)	(Norway) Vålerenga	2 (2018)
	Melissa Lowder	United States	GK		(United States) Santa Clara University	1 (2019)

== Player Transactions ==
As of August 3, 2019

=== Transfers In ===
Player	Position	Previous Club	Fees/Notes	Date
(Spain) Verónica Boquete	MF	(China) Beijing BG Phoenix	Signed	01/04/19
(United States) Gaby Vincent	DF	University of Louisville	Signed	04/17/19
(United States) Mallory Weber	FW	Portland Thorns FC	Acquired off the NWSL Waiver Wire	05/13/19
(United States) Raisa Strom-Okimoto	DF	University of Hawaii	Signed	07/26/19
(United States) Melissa Lowder	GK	Santa Clara University	Signed	07/26/19

=== Transfers Out ===
Player	Position	Next Club	Fees/Notes	Date
(United States) Alex Arlitt	DF	unattached	option declined	10/01/18
(Australia) Katrina Gorry	MF	(Australia) Brisbane Roar	option declined	10/01/18
(Norway) Elise Thorsnes	FW	(Norway) LSK Kvinner	option declined	10/01/18
(United States) Samantha Johnson	DF	retired		06/28/19

=== 2019 NWSL College Draft ===
Source: National Women's Soccer League

Round	Pick	Nat.	Player	Pos.	Previous Team
Round 3	23	(United States)	Michelle Maemone	D	Pepperdine
Round 3	26	(United States)	Madeline Nolf	D	Penn State
Round 4	32	(Peru)	Alexandra Kimball	M	North Carolina
