= 2018 Utah Royals FC season =

Utah Royals FC
2018 season
- Owner: Dell Loy Hansen
- Head coach: Laura Harvey
- Stadium: Rio Tinto Stadium
- NWSL: 5th
- Top goalscorer: Katie Stengel (6)
- Highest home attendance: 19,203 (Apr 14 vs. CHI)
- Lowest home attendance: 7,137 (May 9 vs. ORL)
- Average home league attendance: 9,466
Home colors	Away colors

The 2018 Utah Royals FC season was the team's inaugural season, and its first in the National Women's Soccer League (NWSL), the top division of women's soccer in the United States.

== Non-competitive ==
=== Preseason ===
March 3, 2018 Friendly	Utah Royals FC	v	BYU	Herriman, Utah
				Stadium: Zions Bank Stadium

March 16, 2018 Friendly	UCLA	1–4	Utah Royals FC	Los Angeles, California
9 AM PT	Sheehan 81'	Report	Ratcliffe 10' (Jonsdottir); Matheson 27' (pen.); Kelly 62'; Tymrak 88' (Jonsdottir)	Stadium: Frank Marshall Field

== Competitions ==
=== NWSL regular season ===
==== Standings ====
Pos	Team	Pld	W	D	L	GF	GA	GD	Pts	
1	North Carolina Courage (C)	24	17	6	1	53	17	+36	57	NWSL Shield
2	Portland Thorns FC	24	12	6	6	40	28	+12	42	NWSL Playoffs
3	Seattle Reign FC	24	11	8	5	27	19	+8	41	NWSL Playoffs
4	Chicago Red Stars	24	9	10	5	38	28	+10	37	NWSL Playoffs
5	Utah Royals FC	24	9	8	7	22	23	−1	35	
6	Houston Dash	24	9	5	10	35	39	−4	32	
7	Orlando Pride	24	8	6	10	30	37	−7	30	
8	Washington Spirit	24	2	5	17	12	35	−23	11	
9	Sky Blue FC	24	1	6	17	21	52	−31	9	

Source: NWSL
Rules for classification: Tiebreakers
(C) Champions

==== Results summary ====
Overall								Home						Away					
Pld	Pts	W	L	T	GF	GA	GD	W	L	T	GF	GA	GD	W	L	T	GF	GA	GD
24	35	9	7	8	22	23	−1	5	3	4	11	7	+4	4	4	4	11	16	−5

Last updated: September 8, 2018
Source: NWSLsoccer.com
Pld = Matches played; Pts = Points; W = Matches won; T = Matches tied; L = Matches lost; GF = Goals for; GA = Goals against; GD = Goal difference

==== Results by round ====
Round	1	2	3	4	5	6	7	8	9	10	11	12	13	14	15	16	17	18	19	20	21	22	23	24
Stadium	A	A	H	A	H	H	H	H	A	A	A	A	H	H	A	A	H	H	A	H	H	A	A	H
Result	D	D	L	D	D	W	D	W	L	W	W	L	D	W	L	L	L	D	W	W	L	D	W	W
Position (Note: UTA's position at the end of the matchweek, not the match itself.)	4	5	7	7	7	6	7	6	7	6	5	6	5	5	6	6	6	7	6	6	6	6	5	5

Updated to match(es) played on September 8, 2018. Source: NWSLsoccer.com
A = Away; H = Home; W = Win; D = Draw; L = Loss

==== Match results ====
===== March =====
Sat 24 March 1	Orlando Pride	1–1	Utah Royals FC	Orlando, Florida
7:30 PM ET	Marta 21' (pen.); Krieger (yellow card) 90+3'	Report	Jónsdóttir 3' (Matheson); Sauerbrunn (yellow card) 21'; Ratcliffe (yellow card) 58'	Stadium: Orlando City Stadium; Attendance: 9,017; Referee: Danielle Chesky

Fri 30 March 2	Houston Dash	0–0	Utah Royals FC	Houston, Texas
7 PM CT		Report		Stadium: BBVA Compass Stadium; Attendance: 3,433

===== April =====
Sat 14 April 3	Utah Royals FC	0–1	Chicago Red Stars	Sandy, Utah
1:30 PM MT		Report	Colaprico 27'	Stadium: Rio Tinto Stadium; Attendance: 19,203
Note: Televised on Lifetime.

Sat 21 April 4	North Carolina Courage	2–2	Utah Royals FC	Cary, North Carolina
3:30 PM ET	Mathias 6'; Hamilton (yellow card) 17'; Dunn 80'; Dahlkemper (yellow card) 87'	Report	Ratcliffe (yellow card) 28' (goal) 66'; Stengel 52'	Stadium: Sahlen's Stadium at WakeMed Soccer Park; Attendance: 3,958; Referee: Jon Fremon
Note: Televised on Lifetime.

Sat 28 April 5	Utah Royals FC	1–1	Portland Thorns FC	Sandy, Utah
7 PM MT	Rodriguez 53'; Jonsdottir (yellow card) 49'; Scott (yellow card) 85'	Report	Heath 67' (Sinclair); Purce (yellow card) 36'	Stadium: Rio Tinto Stadium; Attendance: 8,446

===== May =====
Sat 5 May 6	Utah Royals FC	2–0	Washington Spirit	Sandy, Utah
7 PM MT	O’Hara 7'; Sauerbrunn (yellow card) 15'; Matheson 66'	Report	Smith (yellow card) 72'	Stadium: Rio Tinto Stadium; Attendance: 7,551; Referee: Reyna Fonseca

Wed 9 May 7	Utah Royals FC	0–0	Orlando Pride	Sandy, Utah
7 PM MT	Gorry (yellow card) 86'	Report		Stadium: Rio Tinto Stadium; Attendance: 7,137

Sat 19 May 8	Utah Royals FC	1–0	Houston Dash	Sandy, Utah
1:30 PM MT	Elby (yellow card) 9'; Tymrak 51'; Matheson (yellow card) 55'	Report	Daly (yellow card) 12'	Stadium: Rio Tinto Stadium; Attendance: 8,323; Referee: Eric Tattersall
Note: Televised on Lifetime.

Fri 25 May 9	Portland Thorns FC	2–0	Utah Royals FC	Portland, Oregon
	Sinclair 18'; Horan 39', (yellow card) 67'	Report	Corsie (yellow card) 69'; Jónsdóttir (yellow card) 83'	Stadium: Providence Park; Attendance: 15,113; Referee: Lukasz Szpala

===== June =====
Sat 2 June 10	Sky Blue FC	1–2	Utah Royals FC	Piscataway, New Jersey
7 PM ET	Groom 10'; Tiernan (yellow card) 92+'	Report	Matheson 3'; Freeman 85' (o.g.)	Stadium: Yurcak Field; Attendance: 2,229; Referee: Lorant Varga

Sat 16 June 11	North Carolina Courage	0–1	Utah Royals FC	Cary, North Carolina
7 PM ET		Report	Scott (yellow card) 26'; Ratcliffe 90+4'	Stadium: Sahlen's Stadium at WakeMed Soccer Park; Attendance: 5,164

Sat 23 June 12	Chicago Red Stars	2–0	Utah Royals FC	Bridgeview, Illinois
7 PM ET	Naughton 62' (Colaprico); DiBernardo 70' (Kerr); Nagasato (yellow card) 87'	Report		Stadium: Toyota Park; Attendance: 3,317; Referee: Natalie Simon

Wed 27 June 13	Utah Royals FC	0–0	Seattle Reign FC	Sandy, Utah
8 PM MT		Report	Catley (yellow card) 59'	Stadium: Rio Tinto Stadium; Attendance: 8,504

Sat 30 June 14	Utah Royals FC	3–1	Sky Blue FC	Sandy, Utah
8 PM MT	Press 7'; Stengel 25' (Press), 29' (Gorry)	Report	Lloyd 62' (Dorsey)	Stadium: Rio Tinto Stadium; Attendance: 8,394

===== July =====
Fri 6 July 15	Portland Thorns FC	4–0	Utah Royals FC	Portland, Oregon
8 PM PT	Heath 2' (Crnogorčević); Horan 32' (Heath); Crnogorčević 34'; Lussi 62' (Horan)	Report	Johnson (yellow card) 31'; Matheson (yellow card) 45'	Stadium: Providence Park; Attendance: 17, 930

Wed 11 July 16	Seattle Reign FC	1–0	Utah Royals FC	Seattle, Washington
7:30 PM PT	Long (yellow card) 45+2'; Rapinoe 54' (Catley)	Report	Johnson (yellow card) 12'; Corsie (yellow card) 45+2'; Jónsdótti (yellow card) 66'	Stadium: Memorial Stadium (Seattle); Attendance: 3,191

Sat 14 July 17	Utah Royals FC	1–2	Orlando Pride	Sandy, Utah
5:00 PM PT	Rodriguez 8' (Corsie)	Report	Hill (yellow card) 24'; Morgan 45+2' (pen.); Edmonds 52' (Krieger); Kennedy (yellow card) 68'; Ubogagu (yellow card) 75'; Camila (yellow card) 89'	Stadium: Rio Tinto Stadium; Attendance: 8,761
Note: Televised on ESPNews.

Fri 20 July 18	Utah Royals FC	0–0	North Carolina Courage	Sandy, Utah
8 PM PT		Report		Stadium: Rio Tinto Stadium; Attendance: 8,529; Referee: Christina Unkel

===== August =====
Sun 5 August 19	Houston Dash	1–2	Utah Royals FC	Houston, Texas
7:30 PM CT	Latsko 41' (Huerta); Huerta (yellow card) 48'	Report	Press 77'; Stengel 83' (Tymrak)	Stadium: BBVA Compass Stadium; Attendance: 3,907

Wed 8 August 20	Utah Royals FC	1–0	Washington Spirit	Sandy, Utah
8 PM MT	Stengel 74' (Lytle)	Report		Stadium: Rio Tinto Stadium; Attendance: 8,154

Sat 11 August 21	Utah Royals FC	0–1	Seattle Reign FC	Sandy, Utah
1:30 PM MT	Fishlock 48' (Oyster) (yellow card) 74'	Report	Moros (yellow card) 90'	Stadium: Rio Tinto Stadium; Attendance: 8,740
Note: Televised on Lifetime.

Sat 18 August 22	Sky Blue FC	2–2	Utah Royals FC	Piscataway, New Jersey
7 PM ET	Johnson 14' (Rodriguez), 48'; Killion (yellow card) 39'; Lloyd (yellow card) 69'; Tiernan (yellow card) 76'	Report	Richardson 58' (o.g.); Rodriguez 90+4' (Press)	Stadium: Yurcak Field; Attendance: 3,468

Wed 22 August 23	Washington Spirit	0–1	Utah Royals FC	Boyds, Maryland
7:30 PM ET		Report	Rodriguez 12'; Corsie (yellow card) 17'	Stadium: Maryland SoccerPlex; Attendance: 3,318

===== September =====
Sat 8 September 24	Utah Royals FC	2–1	Chicago Red Stars	Sandy, Utah
1:30 PM MT	Rodriguez 55' (Bowen); Stengel 64' (Lytle)	Report	Gilliland (yellow card) 17'; Stanton (yellow card) 25'; Kerr 39' (Gilliland)	Stadium: Rio Tinto Stadium; Attendance: 11,851; Referee: Rosendo Mendoza

== Stats ==
As of September 8, 2018.

Goals
Rank	Player	Nation	Goals
1	Katie Stengel	(United States)	6
2	Amy Rodriguez	(United States)	5
3	Diana Matheson	(Canada)	2
3	Brittany Ratcliffe	(United States)	2
3	Christen Press	(United States)	2
5	Gunnhildur Jónsdóttir	(Iceland)	1
5	Kelley O'Hara	(United States)	1
5	Erika Tymrak	(United States)	1

Assists
Rank	Player	Nation	Assists
1	Gunnhildur Jónsdóttir	(Iceland)	2
1	Christen Press	(United States)	2
1	Taylor Lytle	(United States)	2
4	Rachel Corsie	(Scotland)	1
4	Katrina Gorry	(Australia)	1
4	Diana Matheson	(Canada)	1
4	Amy Rodriguez	(United States)	1
4	Erika Tymrak	(United States)	1
4	Katie Bowen	(New Zealand)	1

Shutouts
Rank	Player	Nation	Shutouts
1	Abby Smith	(United States)	6
2	Nicole Barnhart	(United States)	3

== Honors and awards ==
=== NWSL season awards ===
- Defender of the Year: Becky Sauerbrunn
- Best XI: Becky Sauerbrunn

=== NWSL Team of the Month ===
Month	Goalkeeper	Defenders	Midfielders	Forwards	Ref.
March		(United States) Becky Sauerbrunn	(Iceland) Gunnhildur Jonsdottir		
April		(United States) Becky Sauerbrunn			
May	(United States) Abby Smith	(United States) Becky Sauerbrunn			
June		(United States) Becca Moros (United States) Becky Sauerbrunn			
July		(Scotland) Rachel Corsie			

=== NWSL weekly awards ===
==== Goal of the Week ====
Week	Result	Player	Ref.
1	Won	(Iceland) Gunnhildur Jonsdottir	
4	Nominated	(United States) Brittany Ratcliffe	
5	Nominated	(United States) Amy Rodriguez	
6	Won	(Canada) Diana Matheson	
8	Nominated	(United States) Erika Tymrak	
11/12	Won	(United States) Brittany Ratcliffe	
19	Won	(United States) Katie Stengel	
20	Nominated	(United States) Katie Stengel	
21	Nominated	(United States) Amy Rodriguez	
24	Nominated	(United States) Amy Rodriguez	

==== Save of the Week ====
Week	Result	Player(s)	Ref.
5	Nominated	(United States) Abby Smith	
9	Nominated	(United States) Abby Smith and (United States) Becky Sauerbrunn	
16	Won	(Scotland) Rachel Corsie	
17	Won	(Scotland) Rachel Corsie	
20	Nominated	(United States) Abby Smith	
24	Won	(United States) Nicole Barnhart	

== Club ==
=== Roster ===
As of July 20, 2018. Age calculated as of the start of the 2018 season. All players were in their first year with the club and signed in 2018.

No.	Name	Nat.	Pos.	Date of birth (age)	Previous team
1	Abby Smith	(United States) USA	GK	October 4, 1993 (aged 24)	(United States) Boston Breakers
2	Rachel Corsie	(Scotland) SCO	DF	August 17, 1989 (aged 28)	(United States) Seattle Reign
3	Rebecca Moros	(United States) USA	DF	May 6, 1985 (aged 32)	(United States) FC Kansas City
4	Becky Sauerbrunn	(United States) USA	DF	June 6, 1985 (aged 32)	(United States) FC Kansas City
5	Kelley O'Hara	(United States) USA	DF	August 4, 1988 (aged 29)	(United States) Sky Blue FC
6	Katie Bowen	(New Zealand) NZL	DF	April 15, 1994 (aged 23)	(United States) FC Kansas City
7	Mandy Laddish	(United States) USA	MF	May 13, 1992 (aged 25)	(United States) FC Kansas City
8	Amy Rodriguez	(United States) USA	FW	February 17, 1987 (aged 31)	(United States) FC Kansas City
9	Lo'eau LaBonta	(United States) USA	MF	March 18, 1993 (aged 25)	(United States) FC Kansas City
10	Diana Matheson	(Canada) CAN	MF	April 6, 1984 (aged 34)	(United States) Seattle Reign FC
11	Desiree Scott	(Canada) CAN	MF	July 31, 1987 (aged 30)	(United States) FC Kansas City
12	Taylor Lytle	(United States) USA	MF	March 31, 1989 (aged 29)	(United States) Sky Blue FC
13	Makenzy Doniak	(United States) USA	FW	February 25, 1994 (aged 24)	(United States) North Carolina Courage
14	Alex Arlitt	(United States) USA	DF	August 25, 1993 (aged 24)	(United States) FC Kansas City
15	Erika Tymrak	(United States) USA	MF	August 7, 1991 (aged 26)	(United States) FC Kansas City
16	Samantha Johnson	(United States) USA	DF	June 10, 1991 (aged 26)	(United States) Chicago Red Stars
17	Sydney Miramontez	(United States) USA	DF	October 11, 1994 (aged 23)	(United States) FC Kansas City
18	Nicole Barnhart	(United States) USA	GK	October 10, 1981 (aged 36)	(United States) FC Kansas City
19	Katrina Gorry	(Australia) AUS	MF	August 13, 1992 (aged 25)	(Australia) Brisbane Roar
20	Elise Thorsnes	(Norway) NOR	FW	August 14, 1988 (aged 29)	(Norway) Avaldsnes
21	Christen Press	(United States) USA	FW	December 29, 1988 (aged 29)	(Sweden) Kopparbergs/Göteborg FC
23	Gunnhildur Yrsa Jónsdóttir	(Iceland) ISL	MF	September 28, 1988 (aged 29)	(Norway) Vålerenga
24	Katie Stengel	(United States) USA	FW	February 29, 1992 (aged 26)	(United States) Boston Breakers
25	Brittany Ratcliffe	(United States) USA	FW	February 7, 1994 (aged 24)	(United States) FC Kansas City

=== Transfers ===
As of July 19, 2018.

==== In ====
Date	Pos.	Nat.	Player	Previous club	Fees/notes	Ref.
June 18, 2018	FW	(United States) USA	Christen Press	(Sweden) Kopparbergs/Göteborg FC	Acquired in a three-team trade with Chicago Red Stars and Houston Dash.	
June 18, 2018	DF	(United States) USA	Samantha Johnson	(United States) Chicago Red Stars	Acquired in a three-team trade with Chicago Red Stars and Houston Dash.	
June 28, 2018	FW	(United States) USA	Makenzy Doniak	(United States) North Carolina Courage	Acquired in trade with the North Carolina Courage for the rights to Heather O'Reilly.	

==== Out ====
Player	Position	Destination club	Fees/notes	Date
(United States) Alexa Newfield	MF	unattached	Released	07/19/18
(United States) Maegan Kelly	MF	unattached	Released	06/20/18
(United States) E.J. Proctor	GK	unattached	Released	06/20/18
(United States) Brooke Elby	MF	Chicago Red Stars	Three team trade with the Chicago Red Stars and Houston Dash	06/18/18

Notes

1. Option Declined (OPT): Players who have had their option declined may still be resigned by the club under a new contract.
2. Free Agent (FREE): Players who are out of contract may still be resigned by the club under a new contract.

=== Trialist ===
Player	Position	Previous team	Notes	Date	Result
(United States) Taylor Isom	Defender	Brigham Young University	2018 NWSL College Draft pick #14	01/18/18	
(United States) E.J. Proctor	Goalkeeper	Duke University	2018 NWSL College Draft pick #34	01/18/18	

== See also ==
- 2018 National Women's Soccer League season
