= Lo'eau LaBonta =

American soccer player (born 1993)

- LaBonta with the Kansas City Current in 2026

Personal information
- Full name: Lo'eau Kaiulani LaBonta
- Date of birth: March 18, 1993 (age 33)
- Place of birth: Rancho Cucamonga, California, U.S.
- Height: 5 ft 1 in (1.55 m)
- Position: Midfielder

Team information
- Current team: Kansas City Current
- Number: 10

College career
Years	Team	Apps	(Gls)
2011–2014	Stanford Cardinal	78	(22)

Senior career*
Years	Team	Apps	(Gls)
2015	Sky Blue FC	6	(0)
2016–2017	FC Kansas City	22	(2)
2017–2019	→ WS Wanderers (loan)	21	(1)
2018–2020	Utah Royals	42	(2)
2021–	Kansas City Current	132	(23)

International career^{‡}
2025–	United States	5	(0)
- * Club domestic league appearances and goals as of 16:49, November 14, 2026 (UTC) ‡ National team caps and goals as of January 24, 2026

Loʻeau Kaiulani LaBonta (born March 18, 1993) is an American professional soccer player who plays as a midfielder for the Kansas City Current of the National Women's Soccer League (NWSL), which she captains, and the United States national team.

LaBonta played college soccer for the Stanford Cardinal, where she won the 2011 national championship. She was drafted by Sky Blue FC in the 2015 NWSL College Draft before signing with FC Kansas City in 2016. After FC Kansas City folded, she went to the Utah Royals for three years before returning when the Kansas City Current began play in 2021. She helped lead the Current to the NWSL title game and was named to the NWSL Best XI in 2022. She won the NWSL Shield in 2025 and the NWSL Championship in 2026.

== College soccer ==
LaBonta attended Stanford University from 2011 to 2014, and was part of the NCAA National Championship winning team in the 2011 NCAA Division I women's soccer tournament.

== Club career ==
=== Sky Blue FC, 2015 ===
Sky Blue FC drafted LaBonta from Stanford with the 37th overall pick in the 2015 NWSL College Draft. She made six appearances before Sky Blue FC waived her and Meg Morris in July 2015 to make room on the roster for players returning from the 2015 FIFA Women's World Cup.

=== FC Kansas City, 2016–2017 ===
FC Kansas City signed LaBonta in May 2016. She debuted for FCKC against the Orlando Pride shortly thereafter, and soon earned a regular starting position with the team. FCKC head coach Vlatko Andonovski cited her tenacity in winning possession from opponents for her increased playing time.

==== Western Sydney Wanderers, 2017–2019 (loan) ====
In October 2017, LaBonta joined Australian club Western Sydney Wanderers. She played every match for the Red & Black, scoring one goal. She returned to the Wanderers for the 2018–19 season and appeared in 9 games.

=== Utah Royals FC, 2018–2020 ===
After FC Kansas City ceased operations after the 2017 season, LaBonta was officially added to the roster of the Utah Royals FC on February 8, 2018. LaBonta appeared in 16 games for the Royals in the 2018 NWSL season.

She returned to Utah for the 2019 season and scored her first goal for the club on April 21, in a 1–0 win over the Washington Spirit. LaBonta was named to the NWSL Team of the Month for August, she had 1 goal and 2 assists during the month of August.

=== Kansas City Current, 2021–present ===
Lo'eau LaBonta during Gotham FC vs Kansas City Current on 15 November 2026

LaBonta followed the transfer of player-related assets to the Kansas City expansion team Kansas City Current after the Utah Royals FC folded. It was LaBonta who coined the team chant "KC Baby" as the new team developed an identity.

LaBonta finished the 2022 season with seven goals (five off penalties) and four assists and was selected to the NWSL Best XI. She converted a penalty in the first round of the playoffs, opening a 2–1 win against the Houston Dash. Kansas City reached the championship game, where they lost 2–0 to the Portland Thorns.

LaBonta became the Current's first-choice captain at the start of 2024. She scored her first career brace in a 4–1 win against Portland Thorns on June 23, 2024. On October 26, she assisted both of Temwa Chawinga's goals in the final of the 2024 NWSL x Liga MX Femenil Summer Cup, a 2–0 victory against NJ/NY Gotham FC. She finished the regular season with six goals with one assist as she led the Current to fourth place. In the playoff semifinals, she entered questionable for a leg injury and subbed off at halftime tied 1–1 with the Orlando Pride; the match finished 3–2 to Orlando. LaBonta was named to the NWSL Team of the Month four times and NWSL Second XI at the end of the year.

== International career ==
In May 2025, LaBonta received her first call-up to the United States national team. On May 31, 2025, she made her international debut in a 3–0 victory over China, becoming the oldest player in USWNT history to receive her first cap.

== Personal life ==
LaBonta was born in Rancho Cucamonga, California. She is Native Hawaiian via her mom’s family, and her middle name is in honor of Princess Ka’iulani. LaBonta is married to retired Sporting Kansas City player Roger Espinoza.

In 2008, LaBonta served as a ball girl at a USWNT match in Los Angeles. After learning that LaBonta also shared Native Hawaiian heritage, Natasha Kai sought her out and gave her an autographed cleat.

While attending Stanford, LaBonta earned a degree in engineering.

LaBonta's reputation for elaborate goal celebrations—for which she earned the nickname "Celly Queen"—dates to a penalty kick she took against Angel City FC on August 19, 2022. After scoring, she ran toward the corner flag and motioned as if she had injured her hamstring only to break out into a twerk. Video of the celebration went viral online, and it was emulated by athletes in other sports including Travis Kelce and Alexander Mattison.

In 2024, LaBonta appeared in the first season of The Offseason, a reality television series following a group of NWSL players training before the new season.

== Career statistics ==
=== Club ===
last updated February 16, 2025

Club	Season	Regular Season (Note: Includes playoffs)			Domestic Cup		International		Total	
Club	Season	Division	Apps	Goals	Apps	Goals	Apps	Goals	Apps	Goals
Sky Blue FC	2016	NWSL	6	0	—		—		6	0
FC Kansas City	2017	NWSL	22	2	—		—		22	2
Utah Royals	2018	NWSL	16	0	—		—		16	0
Utah Royals	2019	NWSL	22	2	—		—		27	2
Utah Royals	2020	NWSL	0	0	5	0	—		5	0
Kansas City Current	2021	NWSL	19	1	3	0	—		22	1
Kansas City Current	2022	NWSL	23	8	7	1	—		30	9
Kansas City Current	2023	NWSL	17	2	5	0	—		22	2
Kansas City Current	2024	NWSL	26	6	—		5	2	26	6
Kansas City Current	Total		156	21	20	1	5	2	181	24
WS Wanderers (loan)	2017–2018	W-League	12	1	—		—		12	1
WS Wanderers (loan)	2018–2019	W-League	9	0	—		—		9	0
WS Wanderers (loan)	Total		21	1	0	0	0	0	21	1
Career total			177	22	20	1	5	2	202	25

=== International ===
As of match played January 24, 2026

National team	Year	Apps	Goals
United States	2025	4	0
United States	2026	1	0
Total		5	0

== Honors ==
Kansas City Current

- NWSL Championship: 2026
- NWSL Shield: 2025
- NWSL x Liga MX Femenil Summer Cup: 2024

Individual

- NWSL Best XI: 2022
- NWSL Best XI Second Team: 2024
