= Gunnhildur Yrsa Jónsdóttir =

Icelandic footballer (born 1988)

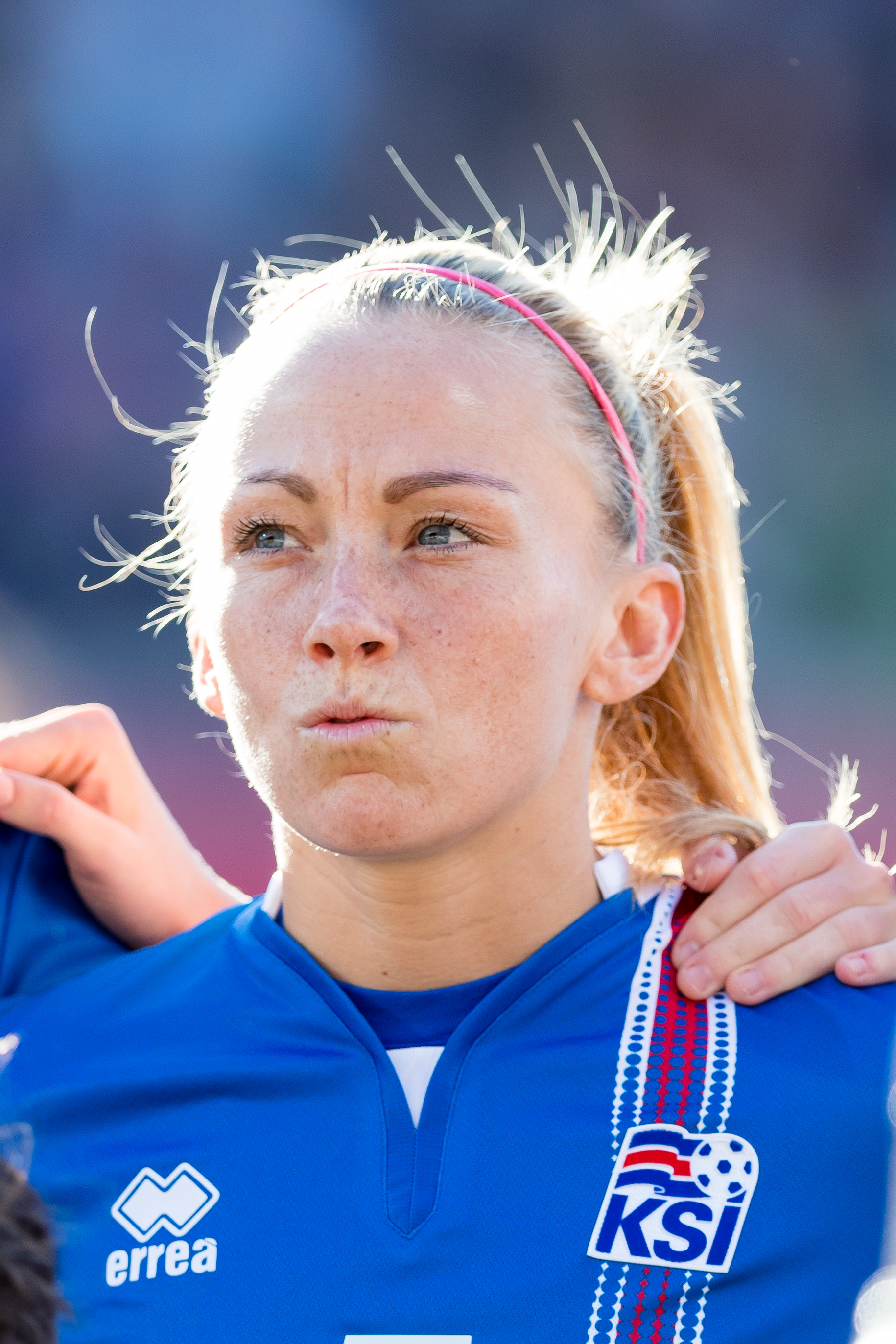
- Gunnhildur with Iceland in 2017

Personal information
- Full name: Gunnhildur Yrsa Jónsdóttir
- Date of birth: 28 September 1988 (age 38)
- Place of birth: Garðabær, Iceland
- Height: 1.65 m (5 ft 5 in)
- Position: Midfielder

College career
Years	Team	Apps	(Gls)
2010	Pepperdine Waves	19	(0)

Senior career*
Years	Team	Apps	(Gls)
2003–2012	Stjarnan	119	(25)
2013–2014	Arna-Bjørnar	14	(0)
2014	Grand Bodø	11	(1)
2015–2016	Stabæk	43	(9)
2017–2018	Vålerenga	21	(5)
2018–2020	Utah Royals FC	48	(2)
2018–2019	→ Adelaide United (loan)	11	(1)
2020	→ Valur (loan)	8	(3)
2021–2022	Orlando Pride	40	(3)
2023–2024	Stjarnan	20	(5)
2025	Halifax Tides FC	14	(1)

International career^{‡}
2004	Iceland U16	4	(0)
2004	Iceland U19	3	(0)
2011–2023	Iceland	102	(14)
- * Club domestic league appearances and goals as of 17 October 2025 ‡ National team caps and goals as of 7 April 2023

Gunnhildur Yrsa Jónsdóttir (born 28 September 1988) is an Icelandic professional footballer who plays as a midfielder. She was a member of the Iceland national team from 2011 to 2023.

== Early life ==
Born in Garðabær, Iceland, Gunnhildur lived in Hartford, Connecticut and Philadelphia from 1996 to 2002 while her mother studied paediatrics. During a chance meeting with Philadelphia Charge and Iceland international Margrét Rannveig Ólafsdóttir in 2001, Margrét offered Gunnhildur tickets to the team's next WUSA game, inspiring her to take up football.

== Club career ==
=== Stjarnan ===
Upon returning to Iceland, Gunnhildur joined Úrvalsdeild side Stjarnan. She made her senior first-team debut on 20 May 2003 at the age of 14 years and 234 days as a 59th-minute substitute in a 4–0 league loss to ÍBV. In 2011, she captained Stjarnan to the first Úrvalsdeild title in club history, scoring 7 goals in 18 appearances. She captained the team to their first Icelandic Cup win the following season, scoring the only goal in the 81st-minute in a 1–0 win over Valur in the final. In 2012 Stjarnan also won the Icelandic Super Cup and made their UEFA Women's Champions League debut against fellow Russian debutants Zorky Krasnogorsk in September 2012. Gunnhildur started the game but was sent off in the 37th-minute for a second booking, leaving Stjarnan to play out a goalless draw. They lost the away leg, for which Gunnhildur was suspended, 3–1.

==== Pepperdine Waves semester ====
In 2010, Gunnhildur transferred from Reykjavík University to study at Pepperdine University for a semester and spent one season playing college soccer for Pepperdine Waves. She made 19 appearances and was an All-WCC honorable mention as a freshman before returning to Iceland.

=== Move to Norway ===
In January 2013, Gunnhildur was recruited by Norwegian Toppserien side Arna-Bjørnar to replace homegrown talisman Maren Mjelde following her transfer to Bundesliga team Turbine Potsdam. She scored her first goal for the club on 5 June 2013 in a 2–0 win over Åsane in the Norwegian Cup. In total she made 16 appearances in 18 months, scoring two cup goals.

In July 2014, Gunnhildur transferred to fellow Toppserien side IK Grand Bodø midway through the season. She scored her only goal for the team on 30 August 2014 in a 5–2 league defeat to Stabæk.

Ahead of the 2015 season, Gunnhildur joined Stabæk. She played in every league game and scored three goals as Stabæk finished fourth. She played in all but one game in the following season, recording her Toppserien-best six goals as Stabæk finished in third place.

Ahead of the 2017 season, Gunnhildur was one of several senior internationals recruited by Vålerenga as they invested in their women's team to push for a first league title and Champions League qualification. She captained the team as they reached their first Norwegian Cup final, losing 1–0 to Avaldsnes IL. Vålerenga finished seventh in the league.

=== Utah Royals ===
In January 2018, Gunnhildur signed with NWSL expansion side Utah Royals for the team's inaugural season. On 24 March 2018, she scored the first goal in club history, giving Utah a lead over Orlando Pride in the third minute. The game finished 1–1. She was named to the NWSL team of the month for March 2018. Gunnhildur played every minute of the 2018 NWSL season with Utah, registering one goal and two assists. She also appeared in every game during the 2019 season, scoring one goal and finishing second on the team for assists with four. With the 2020 season cancelled due to the coronavirus pandemic, Gunnhildur made four appearances during the small schedule 2020 NWSL Challenge Cup replacement tournament. In December 2020, it was announced that the Royals would cease operations and relocate to Kansas City, transferring all player assets in the process. Prior to the team dissolving, Gunnhildur led the franchise with a record 52 appearances.

==== Loan to Adelaide United ====
During the NWSL offseason, Gunnhildur was one of six Utah Royals players loaned to the W-League for the 2018–19 season. She joined Adelaide United alongside Iceland teammate Fanndís Fridriksdóttir and played every minute of the season, scoring one goal.

==== Loan to Valur ====
Following the conclusion of the 2020 NWSL Challenge Cup, Gunnhildur opted to spend the rest of the year on loan with Valur. It marked the first time since 2012 she had played for a club in her native Iceland. The team finished second on a points-per-game basis following the abandonment of the Úrvalsdeild in October with two rounds to go. Gunnhildur scored three goals in eight league appearances and also scored her first career Champions League goal on 4 November 2020 in a first round qualifying 3–0 win against HJK.

=== Orlando Pride ===
On 30 January 2021, Gunnhildur was traded to Orlando Pride along with the playing rights to Erika Tymrak in exchange for Kristen Edmonds and the natural second-round pick in the 2022 NWSL Draft. On 24 January 2023, Orlando announced Gunnhildur would be departing the club to return to Iceland with wife and teammate Erin McLeod following their marriage earlier in the month.

=== Stjarnan return ===
On 25 January 2023, Gunnhildur rejoined hometown club Stjarnan 10 years after she last captained the team. She did not play in the 2024 season, due to her pregnancy.

=== Halifax Tides ===
In 2025, she joined Halifax Tides FC of the Northern Super League.

== International career ==
Gunnhildur made her senior international debut for Iceland on 26 October 2011 as an 89th-minute substitute in a 2–0 win over Northern Ireland during UEFA Women's Euro 2013 qualifying. It was her only appearance in the competition as Iceland qualified for Euro 2013 but she was not selected for the tournament roster.

On 4 April 2015, she scored her first goal for Iceland on her 18th cap in a 2–1 friendly win over the Netherlands.

Gunnhildur played in every match for Iceland during UEFA Women's Euro 2017 qualifying, scoring two goals as Iceland won their group and qualified for Euro 2017. She was named to the tournament squad, her first major international tournament, and started all three games as Iceland lost all three, finishing bottom of the group.

Gunnhildur competed with the Iceland at the 2016 and 2017 Algarve Cup.

Gunnhildur played all eight games of 2019 FIFA Women's World Cup qualification and scored four goals including her first career international brace in an 8–0 win against the Faroe Islands. Iceland finished second in their qualifying group, missing out on the play-offs by one point.

Gunnhildur once again started every game during UEFA Women's Euro 2022 qualifying as Iceland finished second in the group to Sweden with six wins, a draw and a loss. They qualified for their third successive Euro finals as one of the best-placed runners-up.

Following Iceland's win against Austria on 18 July 2023, she announced her retirement from the national team.

== Personal life ==
Gunnhildur, also known as Gunny, has seven siblings: Tindur, Urður, Ilmur, Þórunn, Sigurður, Sæmundur, and Elfur; her parents are Laufey Sigurðardóttir and Jón Saemundsson.

In October 2020, it was made public that Gunnhildur is in a relationship with Canadian national team player Erin McLeod. They married in January 2023. She gave birth to their son in October 2024.

== Career statistics ==
=== Club summary ===
As of 1 October 2022.

Club	Season	League			Cup (Note: Includes the Icelandic Cup, Norwegian Cup and NWSL Challenge Cup)		Continental (Note: Includes the UEFA Women's Champions League)		Other		Total	
Club	Season	Division	Apps	Goals	Apps	Goals	Apps	Goals	Apps	Goals	Apps	Goals
Stjarnan	2003	Úrvalsdeild	12	0	1	0	—		—		13	0
Stjarnan	2004	Úrvalsdeild	11	1	2	0	—		—		13	1
Stjarnan	2005	Úrvalsdeild	0	0	0	0	—		—		0	0
Stjarnan	2006	Úrvalsdeild	9	1	3	2	—		—		12	3
Stjarnan	2007	Úrvalsdeild	4	1	0	0	—		—		4	1
Stjarnan	2008	Úrvalsdeild	17	4	4	2	—		—		21	6
Stjarnan	2009	Úrvalsdeild	18	7	2	3	—		—		20	10
Stjarnan	2010	Úrvalsdeild	12	3	3	1	—		—		15	4
Stjarnan	2011	Úrvalsdeild	18	7	2	1	—		—		20	8
Stjarnan	2012	Úrvalsdeild	18	1	4	4	1	0	1 (Note: 2012 Icelandic Super Cup)	0	24	5
Stjarnan	Total		119	25	21	13	1	0	1	0	142	38
Arna-Bjørnar	2013	Toppserien	7	0	1	1	—		—		8	1
Arna-Bjørnar	2014	Toppserien	7	0	1	1	—		—		8	1
Arna-Bjørnar	Total		14	0	2	2	0	0	0	0	16	2
Grand Bodø	2014	Toppserien	11	1	1	0	—		—		12	1
Stabæk	2015	Toppserien	22	3	4	0	—		—		26	3
Stabæk	2016	Toppserien	21	6	2	1	—		—		23	7
Stabæk	Total		43	9	6	1	0	0	0	0	49	10
Vålerenga	2017	Toppserien	21	5	4	1	—		—		25	6
Utah Royals	2018	NWSL	24	1	—		—		—		24	1
Utah Royals	2019	NWSL	24	1	—		—		—		24	1
Utah Royals	2020	NWSL	—		4	0	—		—		4	0
Utah Royals	Total		48	2	4	0	0	0	0	0	52	2
Adelaide United (loan)	2018–19	W-League	11	1	—		—		—		11	1
Valur (loan)	2020	Úrvalsdeild	8	3	1	0	2	1	—		11	4
Orlando Pride	2021	NWSL	24	1	2	0	—		—		26	1
Orlando Pride	2022	NWSL	16	2	6	2	—		—		22	4
Orlando Pride	Total		40	3	8	2	0	0	0	0	48	5
Career total			315	49	47	19	3	1	1	0	366	69

=== International summary ===
As of 11 October 2022

Iceland
Year	Apps	Goals
2011	1	0
2012	6	0
2013	4	0
2014	2	0
2015	9	1
2016	12	3
2017	14	3
2018	10	2
2019	10	0
2020	8	1
2021	8	2
2022	12	2
Total	96	14

=== International goals ===
As of match played 12 April 2022. Iceland score listed first, score column indicates score after each Jónsdóttir goal.

No.	Date	Cap	Venue	Opponent	Score	Result	Competition
1	4 April 2015	18	Kórinn, Kópavogur, Iceland	Netherlands	1–1	2–1	Friendly
2	2 March 2016	23	Lagos Municipal Stadium, Lagos, Portugal	Belgium	1–0	2–1	2016 Algarve Cup
3	3 June 2016	28	Falkirk Stadium, Falkirk, Scotland	Scotland	3–0	4–0	UEFA Euro 2017 qualifying
4	16 September 2016	30	Laugardalsvöllur, Reykjavík, Iceland	Slovenia	4–0	4–0	UEFA Euro 2017 qualifying
5	1 March 2017	35	Bela Vista Municipal Stadium, Parchal, Portugal	Norway	1–1	1–1	2017 Algarve Cup
6	18 September 2017	46	Laugardalsvöllur, Reykjavík, Iceland	Faroe Islands	2–0	8–0	2019 FIFA World Cup qualification
7	18 September 2017	46	Laugardalsvöllur, Reykjavík, Iceland	Faroe Islands	5–0	8–0	2019 FIFA World Cup qualification
8	6 April 2018	54	Laugardalsvöllur, Reykjavík, Iceland	Slovenia	1–0	2–0	2019 FIFA World Cup qualification
9	10 April 2018	55	Tórsvøllur, Tórshavn, Faroe Islands	Faroe Islands	1–0	5–0	2019 FIFA World Cup qualification
10	10 March 2020	71	Pinatar Arena, San Pedro del Pinatar, Spain	Ukraine	1–0	1–0	2020 Pinatar Cup
11	11 June 2021	79	Laugardalsvöllur, Reykjavík, Iceland	Republic of Ireland	2–0	3–2	Friendly
12	22 October 2021	82	Laugardalsvöllur, Reykjavík, Iceland	Czech Republic	4–0	4–0	2023 FIFA World Cup qualification
13	7 April 2022	88	Voždovac Stadium, Belgrade, Serbia	Belarus	2–0	5–0	2023 FIFA World Cup qualification
14	12 April 2022	89	Na Stínadlech, Teplice, Czech Republic	Czech Republic	1–0	1–0	2023 FIFA World Cup qualification

== Honors ==
Stjarnan

- Úrvalsdeild: 2011
- Icelandic Cup: 2012
- Icelandic Super Cup: 2012
