= Becky Sauerbrunn =

American soccer player (born 1985)

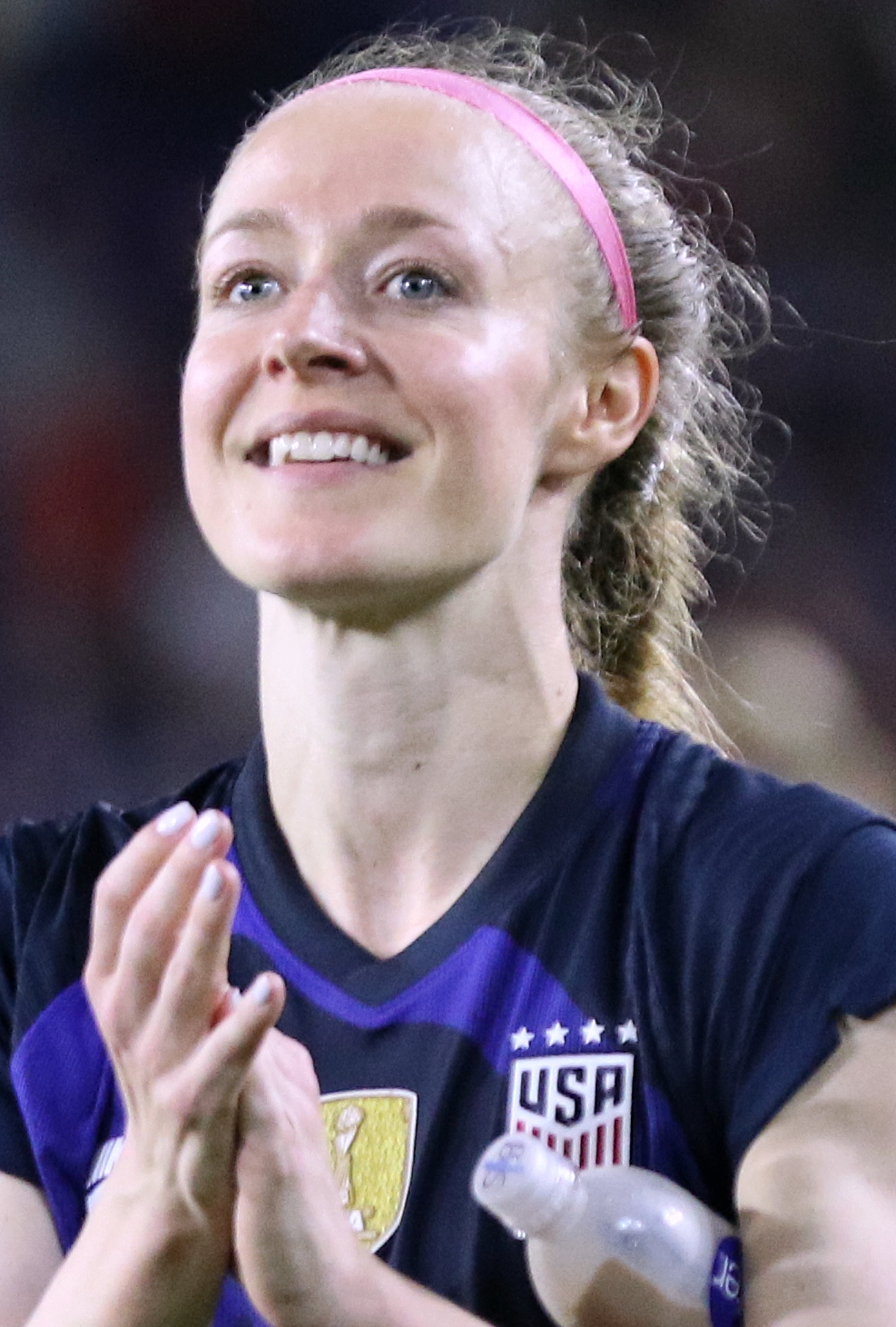
- Sauerbrunn with the United States in 2020

Personal information
- Full name: Rebecca Elizabeth Sauerbrunn
- Date of birth: June 6, 1985 (age 41)
- Place of birth: St. Louis, Missouri, U.S.
- Height: 5 ft 7 in (1.70 m)
- Position: Center back

Youth career
- Jefferson Barracks Marine

College career
Years	Team	Apps	(Gls)
2003–2007	Virginia Cavaliers	90	(2)

Senior career*
Years	Team	Apps	(Gls)
2005	Boston Renegades	11	(1)
2006–2007	Richmond Kickers Destiny	24	(3)
2008–2010	Washington Freedom	50	(1)
2009	→ Røa IL (loan)	5	(1)
2011	magicJack	13	(0)
2012	D.C. United	4	(1)
2013–2017	FC Kansas City	93	(3)
2018–2019	Utah Royals	30	(1)
2020–2024	Portland Thorns	33	(1)

International career^{‡}
2000–2002	United States U-16		
2003–2004	United States U-19		
2005–2009	United States U-23		
2008–2024	United States	219	(0)
Medal record
Women's soccer
Representing the United States
CONCACAF W Gold Cup
Winner	2024 United States
FIFA Women's World Cup
Gold medal – first place	2015 Canada	Team
Gold medal – first place	2019 France	Team
Silver medal – second place	2011 Germany	Team
Olympic Games
Gold medal – first place	2012 London	Team
Bronze medal – third place	2020 Tokyo	Team
- * Club domestic league appearances and goals as of October 29, 2022 ‡ National team caps and goals as of February 26, 2024

Rebecca Elizabeth Sauerbrunn (born June 6, 1985) is an American former professional soccer player who played as a center back. She co-captained the United States national team with Carli Lloyd from 2016 to 2018 and was the captain of the team from 2021 to 2023.

Sauerbrunn played college soccer for the Virginia Cavaliers before starting her professional career with the Washington Freedom in Women's Professional Soccer in 2010. After the National Women's Soccer League (NWSL) formed in 2013, Sauerbrunn led FC Kansas City to two of the league's first three championships. She was named NWSL Defender of the Year three times with Kansas City and once with Utah Royals FC. She won her third championship with Portland Thorns FC, with which she retired in 2024.

Sauerbrunn won gold with the national team at the 2012 London Summer Olympics, 2015 FIFA Women's World Cup, and 2019 FIFA Women's World Cup, and she played for the team at the 2011 FIFA Women's World Cup where they finished in second place. She played every minute for the United States at the 2015 FIFA Women's World Cup.

== Early life ==
Born to Jane and Scott Sauerbrunn in St. Louis, Missouri, Becky was raised with two older brothers, Grant and Adam. Growing up, her brothers motivated her to step up for herself and become physically and mentally tough.

Sauerbrunn played with the JB Marine Soccer Club beginning at age 12. She helped the team win the Missouri State Cup four times as well as a Midwest Regional Championship in 2000.

Sauerbrunn attended Ladue High School, where she was a four-year letter winner in soccer, volleyball, and basketball, where she was a three-year starter at point guard. She was named soccer team captain playing as a sweeper and central midfielder. During her senior season, she scored 21 goals and made 19 assists. She was named 2003 Missouri Gatorade Player of the Year, 2002 and 2003 Parade All-American, 2001 NSCAA Youth All-American, and 2002 NSCAA Adidas (U-17) All-American.

=== University of Virginia, 2003–2007 ===
Sauerbrunn attended the University of Virginia and was a member of the Virginia Cavaliers women's soccer team from 2003 to 2007.

In her freshman season in 2003, Sauerbrunn played in every game for the Cavaliers, starting all 21 of her appearances. In her 1,970 minutes played, she made two assists. Her first career assist came during a match against Wake Forest on October 11. In the first round of the 2003 NCAA Women's Soccer Tournament, Virginia faced William & Mary on November 14. Virginia won the match in penalty kicks and advanced to the second round. In the second round, Virginia faced Villanova on November 16 and lost the match in penalty kicks, halting their advancement in the tournament. Following the 2003 season, Sauerbrunn received NSCAA All-Region honors, NSCAA All-American First Team honors, All-ACC Second Team honors, and ACC All-Freshman Team honors. She was also named ACC Freshman of the Year for 2003.

Sauerbrunn missed the entire 2004 season due to national team obligations at the 2004 FIFA U-20 Women's World Championships in Thailand.

In the 2005 season, Sauerbrunn played in every game for the Cavaliers, starting all 25 of her appearances. She scored her first career goal with the Cavaliers on September 16 against St. Bonaventure. Virginia went on to win the match 7–1. In her 2,289 minutes played, she made one goal and two assists. In the first round of the 2005 NCAA Women's Soccer Tournament, Virginia faced Liberty on November 11. Virginia won the match 4–0 and advanced to the second round. In the second round, Virginia faced Tennessee on November 13. Virginia won the match 3–0 and advanced to the third round. Virginia faced CS Fullerton in the third round and won the game 2–1. In the quarterfinals, Virginia was defeated by UCLA on November 25. Following the 2005 season, Sauerbrunn received NSCAA All-Region honors and All-ACC Second Team honors. She was also named to the ACC All-Academic Team.

In the 2006 season, Sauerbrunn played in every game for the Cavaliers, starting all 21 of her appearances. In the 2006 NCAA Women's Soccer Tournament, Sauerbrunn helped Virginia make it to the third round, where they lost to Texas A&M on November 17. Following the 2006 season, Sauerbrunn received NSCAA All-Region honors, All-ACC First Team honors, and NSCAA All-American Second Team Honors. She was also named to the ACC All-Academic Team.

In the 2007 season, Sauerbrunn played in every game for the Cavaliers, starting all 23 of her appearances. In her 2,232 minutes played, she made one goal and three assists. In the 2007 NCAA Women's Soccer Tournament, Sauerbrunn helped Virginia make it to the third round, where they lost to UCLA in overtime on November 23. Following the 2007 season, Sauerbrunn received NSCAA All-Region honors, NSCAA All-American First Team Honors, and All-ACC First Team honors. She made the Academic All-American team, the ACC All-Tournament Team, and the ACC All-Academic Team. She was named NSCAA Scholar-Athlete of the Year and ACC Player of the Year.

== Club career ==
=== Boston Renegades, 2005 ===
Sauerbrunn played for the Boston Renegades in the W-League in 2005. The W-League was often used by college players as a summer playing option because of its status as an open league, allowing college players to maintain eligibility. She made her first appearance for the team on May 20, 2005, against the Long Island Riders.

=== Richmond Kickers Destiny, 2006–2007 ===
Sauerbrunn played for the Richmond Kickers Destiny in the W-League for the 2006 and 2007 seasons. In her two seasons with the team, Sauerbrunn made 24 appearances, playing 2,137 minutes. Although she was mainly a defensive player, she also scored three goals in her time with the team.

=== Washington Freedom, 2008–2009 ===
Sauerbrunn played for the Washington Freedom in the W-League for the 2008 season.

The Washington Freedom joined the newly formed Women's Professional Soccer league for the 2009 season. On October 6, 2008, Sauerbrunn was picked third overall in the first round of the 2008 WPS General Draft, which assigned the WPS rights of international and domestic players to the teams in the WPS for the 2009 season. Sauerbrunn made her first appearance for the team on March 29, 2009, in a match against the Los Angeles Sol. She started all 20 games for the Freedom in the regular season and in the team's one playoff match. She made one goal during the season in the 54th minute of the match against the Chicago Red Stars on April 11.

=== Røa IL, 2009 ===
Following the 2009 season with the Washington Freedom, Sauerbrunn played for Røa IL for three months in Norway in Toppserien, the top level professional league for women in Norway. She made her first appearance for the team on September 26, 2009, in a match against Kattem IL, where she played all 90 minutes and scored a goal in the 13th minute. She made five appearances for Røa IL in the domestic league. Røa were confirmed as league champions on the last day of the season after drawing 0–0 with Stabæk on October 31, a match in which Sauerbrunn started. She then went on to play in two rounds of UEFA Women's Champions League against Everton and Zvezda 2005 Perm, helping Røa advance to the quarterfinals.

=== Washington Freedom, 2010 ===
Sauerbrunn returned to the Freedom for the 2010 WPS season. She played in all 24 games of the regular season for the Freedom. At the end of the regular season, the Freedom ranked fourth in the league and advanced to the playoffs. The Freedom faced the Philadelphia Independence in the first round of the playoffs on September 19. Sauerbrunn started the match and played all 120 minutes, which ended in a 1–0 defeat for the Freedom.

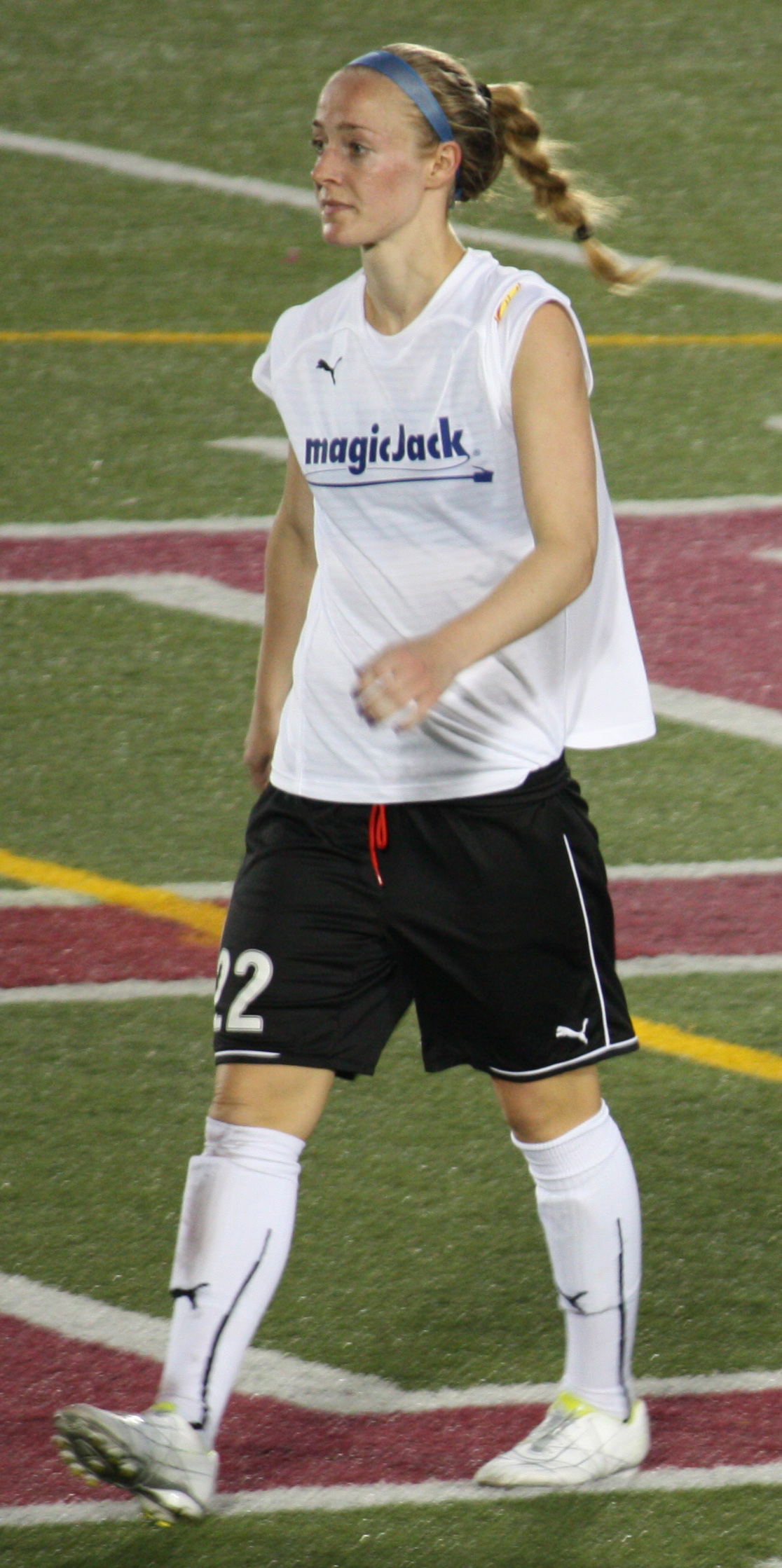
Sauerbrunn with magicJack during a match against the Boston Breakers on August 6, 2011

=== magicJack, 2011 ===
On December 2, 2010, Dan Borislow bought the Washington Freedom, changed its name to magicJack and relocated the team to Boca Raton, Florida, for the 2011 season. Sauerbrunn remained with the team after the change and made a start in the team's first appearance under the new name on April 23, 2011, against the Boston Breakers, a 1–0 win. She made 13 total appearances for the team in the regular season. magicJack ended the season ranked third in the league and advanced to the playoffs. On August 17, Sauerbrunn appeared in magicJack's match against the Boston Breakers in the first round of the playoffs. magicJack won 3–1 and they advanced to the semifinals. Sauerbrunn started in the semifinal match against Philadelphia Independence, a 2–0 defeat for magicJack.

On October 25, 2011, the WPS Board of Governors voted to terminate the magicJack franchise, accusing Borislow of violations ranging from "unprofessional and disparaging treatment of his players to failure to pay his bills." All players were released and became free agents on November 9, 2011.

=== Sky Blue FC, 2012 ===
Sauerbrunn signed with Sky Blue FC for the 2012 season. However, on January 30, 2012, the WPS Board of Governors voted to suspend the 2012 season because of an ongoing legal dispute with Borislow following the termination of magicJack. The league officially folded in May of the same year.

=== D.C. United Women, 2012 ===
In March 2012, following the suspension of the 2012 WPS season, Sauerbrunn signed with D.C. United Women in the W-League for the 2012 season. She helped the team finish first place in the Eastern Conference but was unable to appear in any playoff matches due to her national team obligations at the 2012 Summer Olympics in London.

=== FC Kansas City, 2013–2017 ===
A new professional league, the National Women's Soccer League, was announced in November 2012. On January 11, 2013, Sauerbrunn was allocated to FC Kansas City via the NWSL Player Allocation, which distributed national team players from the United States, Canada, and Mexico to teams in the NWSL. She was one of three members of the United States women's national team that was allocated to FC Kansas City, along with Nicole Barnhart and Lauren Holiday.

For the 2013 season, Sauerbrunn as named co-captain along with Holiday. Sauerbrunn made her first appearance in the team's season opener against the Portland Thorns on April 14, 2013. She went on to make a total of 19 appearances for the team in the regular season in 2013, starting all 19. She helped Kansas City finish second in the league behind the Western New York Flash. On August 24, Sauerbrunn played all 120 minutes of the semifinal match against the Portland Thorns, which ended in a 3–2 defeat for Kansas City in overtime. Sauerbrunn was awarded Defender of the Year for the 2013 season. She was also named to the 2013 NWSL Best XI.

In the 2014 season, she once again served as co-captain with Holiday. Sauerbrunn started all 22 of her appearances in the regular season, playing a total of 1935 minutes and made one goal. She scored the first goal in her career with the NWSL on July 30 against the Washington Spirit. She helped Kansas City finish second in the league behind Seattle Reign FC. On August 23, Kansas City faced the Portland Thorns in the semifinals. Sauerbrunn played all 90 minutes of the match, which ended in a 2–0 win for Kansas City. Sauerbrunn then helped Kansas City defeat Seattle Reign in the championship match on August 31. Sauerbrunn was awarded Defender of the Year for the 2014 season. She was also named to the 2014 NWSL Best XI.

Sauerbrunn made 11 appearances for FC Kansas City in the 2015 season, missing nine regular season games due to national team obligations at the 2015 FIFA Women's World Cup. She helped Kansas City finish third in the league and advance to the playoffs. Sauerbrunn played all 90 minutes of the semifinal match against Chicago Red Stars on September 13, a 3–0 win for Kansas City. Sauerbrunn then helped Kansas City defeat Seattle Reign in the championship match on October 1. Sauerbrunn was awarded Defender of the Year for the 2015 season and became the first player in NWSL history to win a league award three years in a row. She was also named to the 2015 NWSL Best XI for the third time.

=== Utah Royals FC, 2018–2019 ===
After FCKC ceased operations, her rights were transferred to Utah. Sauerbrunn was named to the NWSL Team of the Month for March, April, May and June. She was named to the NWSL Best XI for the sixth consecutive season, and was named a finalist for Defender of the Year.

Following the 2019 season, Sauerbrunn was named Defender of the Year for a fourth time.

=== Portland Thorns FC, 2020–2024 ===
In March 2020, Utah Royals FC officially traded Sauerbrunn to Portland Thorns FC in exchange for defender Elizabeth Ball and $100,000 in allocation money.

On February 7, 2022, Thorns FC announced that the club had signed Sauerbrunn to a one-year contract.

On June 19, 2022, Sauerbrunn scored her first goal for Thorns FC in a 6–0 victory against Orlando Pride.

On October 4, 2022, following the release of the Yates Report regarding the 2021 NWSL abuse scandal and other widespread abuse in the league, Sauerbrunn remarked in a press conference that "every owner and executive and U.S. Soccer official who has repeatedly failed the players, and failed to protect the players, and have not participated fully in these investigations should be gone". The report had implicated Thorns FC executives Gavin Wilkinson and Mike Golub, and owner Merritt Paulson, in failing to act on reports of abuse, and stated that the Thorns as an organization had failed to cooperate in the investigation. When asked if her statement included Paulson, Sauerbrunn reiterated that her request included "everyone that has continued to fail the players" and "who have not participated in investigations — all of them."

The offseason period prior to the 2023 National Women's Soccer League season introduced free agency, and Sauerbrunn's tenure in the league qualified her for unrestricted free agency, which allowed her to sign with any team in the league. Thorns FC announced on September 30, 2022, that the club had signed Sauerbrunn to a one-year contract extension for the 2023 season, and on January 23, 2024, that they had signed her for the 2024 season. She played her final game, a playoff loss to Gotham FC, on November 10, 2024.

== International career ==
=== Youth national teams ===
In 1999, Sauerbrunn attended the United States U-14 Girl's National Team Identification Camp.

==== U-16 national team ====
Sauerbrunn represented the United States as a member of the U-16 women's national team from 2000 to 2002. In 2001, Sauerbrunn was on the U-16 national team that competed in the United States Amateur Soccer Festival from July 29 to August 5. During the festival, Sauerbrunn appeared in a match against an older East Region Team on July 30 that ended in a 0–0 draw and a match against the West Region Team on August 1 that ended in a 5–1 win. On August 3, Sauerbrunn appeared in a match against Mexico's U-18 national team. She also appeared in the team's final match in the festival against the USASA National Select Team on August 5, which ended in a 2–2 draw. In March 2002, Sauerbrunn was on the roster for a series of three matches at the IMG Academy in Bradenton, Florida. She was then named to the roster for a three game series in Houston in July and August.

==== U-19 national team ====
In 2003, Sauerbrunn moved up to the U-19 national team and started off the year at the ARCO U.S. Olympic Training Center in San Diego, California, from January 18 to 26. In February, Sauerbrunn was on the roster for a two-game series with the full Mexican women's national team. She then joined the team once again for a nine-day training camp at the ARCO Olympic Training Center in April. While there, the team played a match against the San Diego Spirit. Sauerbrunn traveled with the U-19 national team to Spring, Texas, for the USYS Cup from May 24 to June 1. Sauerbunn started in the first match of the tournament against Canada on May 27 in a 6–1 win. Following the USYS Cup, Sauerbrunn joined the U-19 national team on a trip to Europe that involved three matches on July 2, July 5, and July 9.

The team gathered one last time for the year for a training camp from December 27 to January 2 at the U.S. Soccer's National Training Center at The Home Depot Center in Carson, California. Sauerbrunn was on the 26-player roster for the training camp. Shortly after, in 2004, Sauerbrunn joined the team for another training camp from January 23 to February first at The Home Depot Center.

Sauerbrunn was named to the 18-player roster for a two-game series against the full Mexican women's national team on February 18 and 20. Following the matches, she trained with the U-19 team at The Home Depot Center in Carson, California.

Sauerbrunn was a member of the U-19 national team that played in the Philips Lighting U-19 Women's Soccer Invitational, their first major domestic tournament, from April 6 to 10. In the first match of the tournament against Holland on April 6, Sauerbrunn made an appearance and helped the United States win 2–0. On April 8, Sauerbrunn started in the team's first-ever loss to another U-19 team in the match against Japan. She made an appearance during the team's final match against China on April 10. The match was a 4–0 win, giving the United States a second-place finish in the invitational.

On April 28, Sauerbrunn was named to the 18-player roster that would represent the United States at the CONCACAF U-19 Women's Qualifying Tournament held in Ottawa, Ontario, and Montreal, Quebec, in Canada. She was co-captain of the team and led the team's defense. Sauerbrunn started in the team's opening match against the Dominican Republic on May 28 for a 14–0 win. She then started in the game against Trinidad & Tobago on May 30. The United States won the match 11–1, guaranteeing their spot in the semifinals. She appeared once again on June 1 during the team's final group match against Costa Rica, which ended in a 0–0 draw. In the semifinal match against Mexico on June 4, Sauerbrunn helped secure the United States U-19 women's national team a place in the 2004 FIFA U-19 Women's World Championship with a 6–0 win, although they still had one more match in the tournament. Sauerbrunn started in the final against Canada on June 6. Canada won the match in overtime.

Sauerbrunn trained with the U-19 national team during their first training camp following the CONCACAF Qualifying Tournament. The training took place in from July 7 to 18 in New Jersey. Leading up to the FIFA U-19 Women's World Championship held in November, Sauerbrunn joined the U-19 team for another training at the U.S. Soccer's National Training Center at The Home Depot Center in Carson, California, in late August.

Sauerbrunn did not play with the University of Virginia Cavaliers for the 2004 season in order to train with the U-19 team leading up to the U-19 World Championship in a modified residency program. In the two months leading up to the championship, the team trained together in two-week blocks until they left for the tournament in November.

On October 12, Sauerbrunn was named to the 21-player roster that would represent the United States at the 2004 FIFA U-19 Women's World Championship in Thailand. Sauerbrunn was co-captain of the team and played every minute in all six matches of the tournament for the United States.

In the opening group match against South Korea on November 11, Sauerbrunn helped the United States post a shut out victory with a 3–0 win. On November 14, she started in the match against Russia. One goal made it through the defense and the United States won 4–1. In the team's final group match on November 18, Sauerbrunn helped the United States defeat Spain in a 1–0 victory. The United States was the only team to win all three of its group matches. In the quarterfinals, Sauerbrunn helped the United States advance with a 2–0 win over Australia. The United States moved into the semifinals, where Sauerbrunn started in the match against Germany on November 24. The Germans took the win and halted the United States' advancement in the tournament. The United States faced Brazil in the third place match, where Sauerbrunn played all 90 minutes. The United States won the game 3–0 and took away third place. Sauerbrunn was subsequently named to the Tournament All-Star Team by the FIFA Technical Study Group.

==== U-21/U-23 national team ====
Following the 2004 FIFA U-19 Women's World Championship, Sauerbrunn joined the U-21 national team for a training camp in 2005 at the U.S. Soccer National Team Training Center from March 26 to April 3 in preparation for the 2005 Nordic Cup. She trained with the team once again in late May in the largest training camp in the women's national team history. She was not named to the roster for the 2005 Nordic Cup in July.

In 2006, Sauerbrunn trained with the U-21 national team from March 19 to 24 at The Home Depot Center in preparation for the 2006 Nordic Cup. She was not named to the roster for the 2006 Nordic Cup in July.

Sauerbrunn traveled to Germany with the U-21 national team from May 18 to 27 for three matches against Gutersloh, SG Essen-Schönebeck, and 07 Bad Neuenahr in 2007. She then trained with the team in early June in Portland, Oregon, in preparation for the 2007 Nordic Cup. Following the training camp, Sauerbrunn was named to the 18-player roster for the 2007 Nordic Cup roster held in late July in Vassa, Finland. Sauerbrunn came in during the 89th minute of the team's opening match in the tournament against Norway, a 1–0 win for the United States. She also appeared in the final minutes of the match on July 22 and helped the United States defeat Sweden to advance to the championship game. In the championship game, the United States faced Germany. Sauerbrunn came in for Ali Krieger in the 79th minute to help the United States win the match and the Nordic Cup title.

In 2008, the U-21 team changed to U-23 after the Nordic Cup was changed to a U-23 competition. Following her short time with the full national team in early 2008, Sauerbrunn joined the now U-23 national team at the La Manga Tournament in Spain. The United States placed second in the tournament after a 1–1 draw with Germany in their final match. Sauerbrunn then traveled with the team to England for two matches against the England U-23 national team. The first match took place on March 12 and Sauerbrunn made the start. The United States defeated England 1–0. Sauerbrunn started in the second match on March 14 and the United States won 2–0.

Sauerbrunn trained with the U-23 national team from June 5 to 12 at The Home Depot Center in preparation for the 2008 Nordic Cup. Sauerbrunn was subsequently named to the roster or the 2008 Nordic Cup held in late July. The United States won the Nordic Cup championship after defeating Germany on July 21.

=== Senior National Team ===
==== First Cap ====
Sauerbrunn was first called up to the United States women's national team for a six-day training camp at the Home Depot Center in Carson, California, from January 3 to 8 in 2008. Following the training camp, she was named to the roster for the Four Nations Tournament in China. During the tournament, she earned her first cap against Canada on January 16, which she started. Sauerbrunn trained with the national team again in February 2008. She then went back down to the U-23 team.

==== Return to the national team, 2010 ====
In late September 2010, Sauerbrunn made her return to the national team when she was called into a national team training camp in Atlanta to replace Joanna Lohman, who was recovering from an ankle injury. Immediately following the 20-day training camp, Saeurbrunn was named to the 20-player roster for the 2010 CONCACAF Women's World Cup Qualifying tournament held from October 28 to November 8. With two caps, she had the least experience on the roster. She made one appearance during the tournament, coming in for Amy LePeilbet in the 56th minute of the match against Guatemala on October 30. The United States placed third in the tournament and a berth in a two-game series against Italy for the last spot in the 2011 FIFA Women's World Cup. Sauerbrunn was on the preliminary roster for the two matches.

==== 2011 FIFA Women's World Cup ====
Sauerbrunn started off 2011 with the national team at a six-day training camp at The Home Depot Center in Carson, California, from January 8 to 13. Following the training, Sauerbrunn was named to the 23-player roster for the 2011 Four Nations Tournament held in China. Sauerbrunn made her first start since 2008 during the tournament on January 23 in a match against Canada. She played all 90 minutes in the match, which ended in a 2–1 win for the United States. She also made an appearance during the match against China on January 25, helping the United States win the Four Nations Tournament.

Sauerbrunn joined the national team for a 32-player training camp in Florida that took place from February 3 to 9 in preparation for the 2011 Algarve Cup. Following the camp, Sauerbrunn was named to the 23-player roster for the Algarve Cup. Sauerbrunn came in during the second half in the match against Norway on March 4 as well as in the match against Finland on March 7. She started in the final against Iceland, helping the United States win the 2011 Algarve Cup title with a 4–2 win.

Sauerbrunn was named to the 23-player roster for a 20-day training camp in the United Kingdom in February and April. During the training camp, the United States played a match against England on April 2, although Sauerbrunn did not make an appearance.

From April 18 to May 6, Sauerbrunn joined the national team for a three-week training camp in Florida. On May 9, following the training camp, Sauerbrunn was named to the 21-player roster for the 2011 FIFA Women's World Cup. Sauerbrunn trained with the team in June for eight days in Austria before going to Germany for the World Cup. Sauerbrunn's one appearance during the tournament came during the semifinal against France on July 13. She replaced Rachel Buehler in the starting lineup, as she was serving a suspension and not eligible to play in the match. The United States won the match 3–1 and advanced to the final. The United States went on be defeated by Japan in the final.

Sauerbrunn trained with the national team for two weeks in November in Arizona leading into a match against Sweden on November 19. She was then named to 18-player game roster for the match against Sweden and made an appearance during the game. Following the match, Sauerbrunn was called up for an 18-day training camp in Carson, California, at The Home Depot Center from December 3 to 20.

==== 2012 Summer Olympics ====
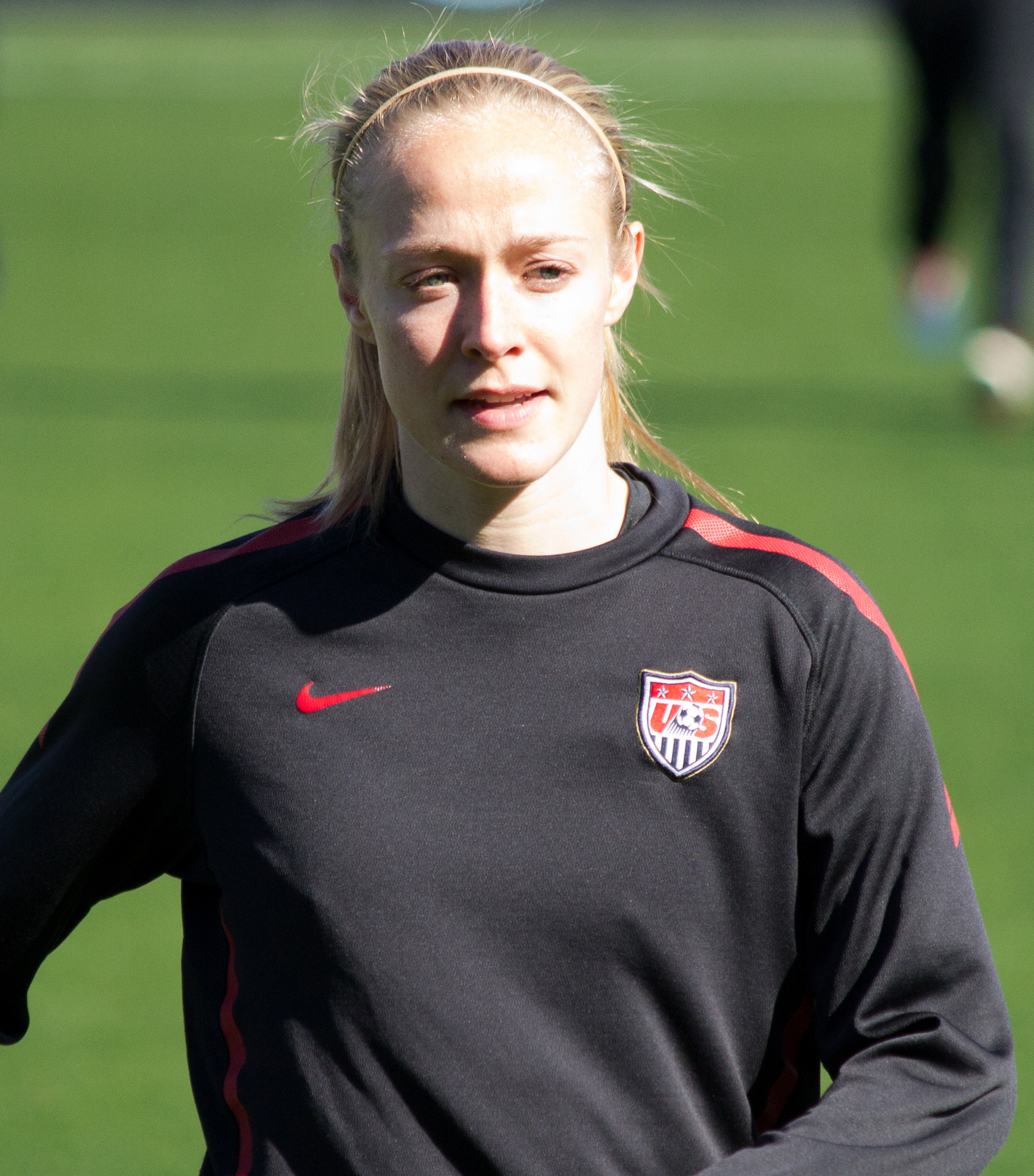
Sauerbrunn with the United States national team prior to an international friendly against New Zealand in Frisco, Texas, in February 2012

Sauerbrunn trained with the national team during the first training camp of the year from January 7 to 15. Immediately following the camp, Sauerbrunn was named to the 20-player roster for the 2012 CONCACAF Women's Olympic Qualifying tournament from January 10 to 29 in Vancouver. She started in the final two group matches against Guatemala and Mexico on January and January 24, respectively. She also started in the final match against Canada on January 29, helping the United States win 4–0. Their first place finish gave them a berth to the 2012 Summer Olympics.

Following the 2012 CONCACAF Olympic Qualifying Tournament, Sauerbrunn joined a 28-player roster for a training camp in Frisco, Texas, in the week leading up to a match against New Zealand on February 11. On February 17, Sauerbrunn was named to a 23-player roster that would travel to Portugal for the 2012 Algarve Cup. She was subsequently named to the roster of 21 players that would suit up for the matches of the tournament. Sauerbrunn made one appearance during the Algarve Cup, with a start in the match against Norway on March 2.

Sauerbrunn traveled to Japan with the national team for the Women's Kirin Challenge Cup in early April. She did not appear in the team's first match against Japan on April 1, but came in during the second half in the second match against Brazil on April 3, a 3–0 win. Following the tournament, she trained with the national team in Florida from April 18 to 30. She was then called up to a training camp in Princeton, New Jersey, from May 10 to 25 in preparation for a match against China on May 27. She was subsequently named to the 18-player roster for the match and came in during the 62nd minute of the match, a 4–1 win for the United States.

On May 27, Sauerbrunn was one of the 18 players named to the team that would represent the United States at the 2012 Summer Olympics in London. The team, plus the four alternates, then traveled to Sweden for the Volvo Winners Cup, consisting of a match against Sweden on June 16 and Japan on June 18. Sauerbrunn came in during the second half of both matches.

Sauerbrunn made her Olympic debut on July 31, 2012, in a group match against Korea DPR. She came in for Rachel Buehler in the 75th minute. She also played in the final ten minutes of the semifinal match against Canada on August 6, a 4–3 win for the United States that sent them to the final. Sauerbrunn came in during the 80th minute of the match against Japan on August 9. The United States won the match 2–1, taking away the gold medal. In her three appearances in the tournament, Sauerbrunn played a total of 38 minutes. Following the Olympics, Sauerbrunn joined the national team on the Fan Tribute Tour.

==== 2013–2014 ====
In 2013, Sauerbrunn was a consistent starter at the center-back position. She started 10 of her 12 appearances during 2013, playing a total of 940 minutes.

In January 2013, Sauerbrunn was called up to a 29-player training camp leading up to two matches against Scotland in early February. On February 21, Saeurbrunn was named to the 23-player roster for the 2013 Algarve Cup in Portugal that took place from March 6 to 13. Although she did not appear in the team's first match against Iceland on March 6, Sauerbrunn wore the captain's armband in her first appearance of the tournament on March 8 in a match against China. She also started in a match against Sweden on March 11 and came in during the 68th minute of the final match to help the United States win the Algarve Cup title.

Following the 2013 Algarve Cup, Sauerbrunn traveled to Europe with the national team for matches against Germany and the Netherlands in early April. She appeared during the match against the Netherlands on April 9, a 3–1 win for the United States. In late May, Sauerbrunn was named to the 21-player roster that traveled to Canada to train in preparation for a match against Canada on June 2. She did not appear in the match.

In 2014, Sauerbrunn made 22 appearances, starting 20, and played a total of 1,757 minutes. She started off the year at a national team training camp from January 8 to 15 at U.S. Soccer's National Training Center in Carson, California. Following the training camp, Sauerbrunn made her 50th appearance for the national team in a match against Canada on January 31 in Frisco, Texas. She was the 46th player in United States women's national team history to reach 50 caps.

On February 24, Sauerbrunn was named to the 24-player roster for the 2014 Algarve Cup that took place from March 5 to 12. She wore the captain's armband during the team's first match of the tournament on March 5 against Japan, a 1–1 draw. She also started in the match against Sweden on March 7, a game that ended the 43-game unbeaten streak for the United States. Sauerbrunn came in during the 62nd minute of the match against Denmark on March 10, a 5–3 defeat for the United States. Sauerbrunn started in the match against Korea DPR that secured their seventh place finish in the tournament.

Sauerbrunn joined the team for a two-game series against China in April. She started in both matches and wore the captain's armband in the second game on April 10. In late April, Sauerbrunn was named to a 22-player roster for a match against Canada on May 8. She played all 90 minutes in the match, which ended in a 1–1 draw. She was then named to the roster for two games against France on June 14 and 19. She started both matches. Sauerbrunn was named to a 19-player roster for a match against Switzerland on August 20 in Sandy, Utah. She started the match and was replaced by Julie Johnston in the second half. The United States went on the win 4–1.

Sauerbrunn joined the national team for a training camp at the end of August in order to prepare for two matches against Mexico in September as well as the 2014 CONCACAF Women's Qualifying tournament in October. She appeared in both games against Mexico and was subsequently named to the roster for the 2014 CONCACAF Women's Championship that served as a qualification for the 2015 FIFA Women's World Cup. Sauerbrunn made three appearances in the tournament. She started for the United States in their opening match against Trinidad & Tobago on October 15, which they won 1–0. She also appeared in the team's second group match against Guatemala on October 17, a 5–0 win for the United States. Her third appearance came during the final against Costa Rica on October 26, helping the United States win the tournament and qualify for the 2015 FIFA Women's World Cup.

Following the CONCACAF Qualifying tournament, Sauerbrunn was named to the 24-player roster for the International Tournament of Brasilia in Brazil that took place from December 10 to 21. Sauerbrunn started all four games of the tournament. She was named Budweiser Woman of the Match for the team's opening match against China, which resulted in a 1–1 draw. In the final against Brazil, Sauerbrunn made a header off of a corner kick by Megan Rapinoe, but the shot was saved by Luciana, Brazil's goalkeeper. The game was a 0–0 draw, but the tournament title was given to Brazil, who had more points from the group stage.

==== 2015 FIFA Women's World Cup ====
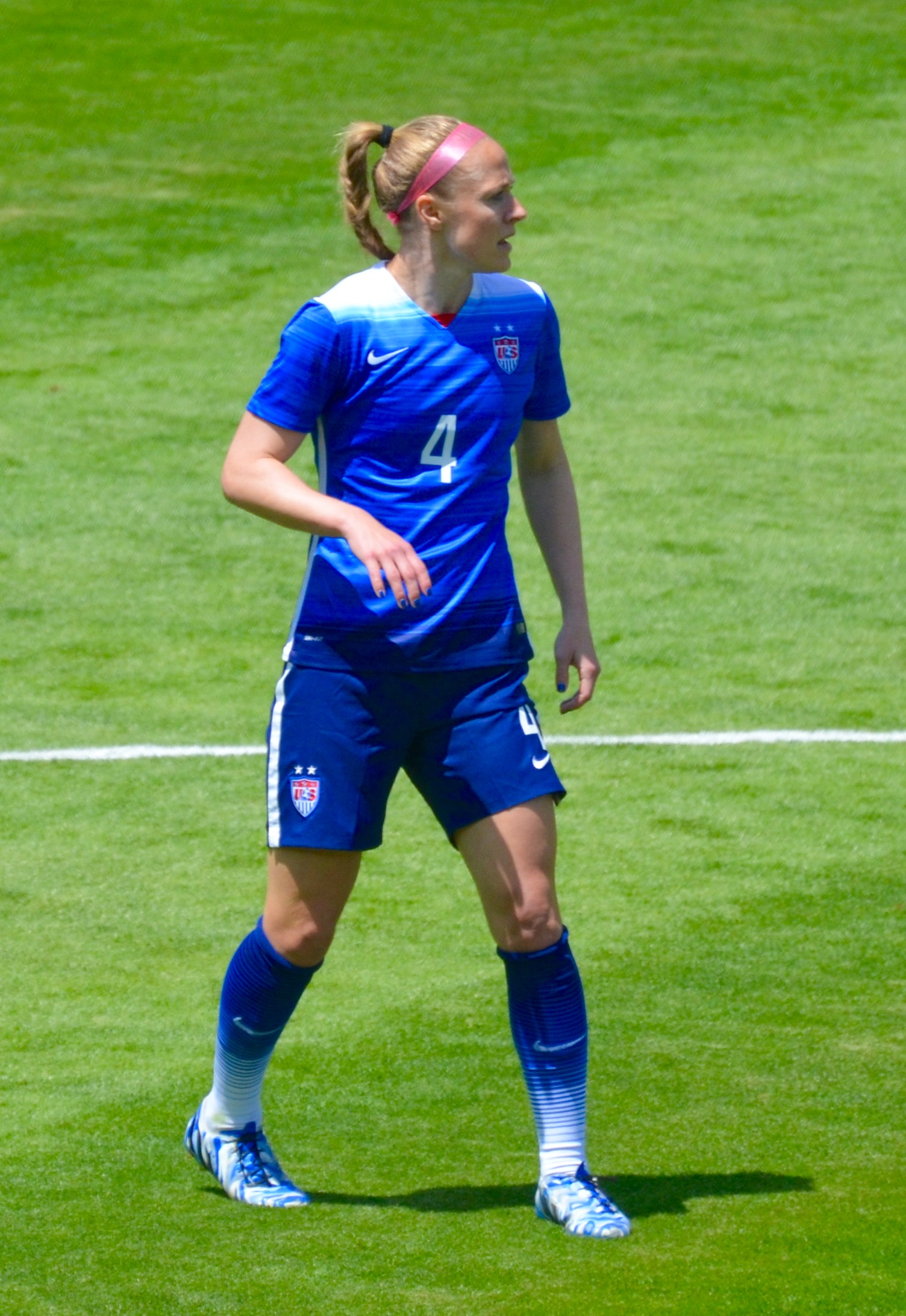
Sauerbrunn in 2015

Sauerbrunn started all 25 matches for the United States in 2015, the only player to do so. She also had the most minutes played on the team with 2,184.

Sauerbrunn started off the year at a 21-day training camp in 2015 from January 5 to 25 at the U.S. Soccer National Training Center in Carson, California. Following the training camp, Sauerbrunn was named to the 24-player team that would travel on a 13-day trip to Europe for matches against France and England in mid-February. Sauerbrunn played all 90 minutes in the match against France on February 8. She made a key save in the opening minutes of the game and assisted in halting the opposing team's attack. She was subsequently named Budweiser Woman of the Match. She also played all 90 minutes in the match against England on February 13, which was a shutout victory for the United States.

On February 21, Sauerbrunn was named to the 25-player roster for the 2015 Algarve Cup in Portugal. She started all four of the matches for the United States and was named Budweiser Woman of the Match for the 0–0 draw against Iceland on March 9. She was then named to a 25-player roster on March 20 for a match against New Zealand on April 4 in her hometown of St. Louis. She started in the match and played all 90 minutes, helping the United States defeat New Zealand 4–0.

On April 14, 2015, Sauerbrunn was named to the 23-player roster that would represent the United States at the 2015 FIFA Women's World Cup. She played every minute in all seven matches for the United States during the World Cup. Sauerbrunn became a World Cup Champion on July 5, when she helped the United States defeat Japan 5–2 in the Women's World Cup final. Sauerbrunn joined the national team on a Victory Tour following their World Cup win that started in Pittsburgh, Pennsylvania, on August 16 and ended in New Orleans, Louisiana, on December 16.

==== 2016 Summer Olympics ====
On January 9, 2016, Sauerbrunn was named captain of the United States women's national team along with Carli Lloyd.

Sauerbrunn joined the national team for their first training camp of the year at the U.S. Soccer National Training Center in Carson, California, from January 5 to 21. She was then named to the 20-player roster for 2016 CONCACAF Women's Olympic Qualifying. The United States qualified to the 2016 Olympic Games in Rio de Janeiro after a semifinal win against Trinidad & Tobago on February 19. Sauerbrunn made her 100th appearance for the national team on February 21 in the final against Canada. During the match, she also made her third career assist. The United States won the tournament after defeating Canada 2–0. Following the tournament, Sauerbrunn was named to the 2016 CONCACAF Women's Olympic Qualifying Best XI.

Sauerbrunn was named to the roster for the 2016 SheBelieves Cup that took place from March 3 to 9. She started in the team's opening match of the tournament on March 3 against England. Sauerbrunn was noted for her good positioning during the match, helping block a shot in the 59th minute. She also made appearances in other two matches of the tournament, helping the United States win the 2016 SheBelieves Cup with a 2–1 win over Germany in their final game.

Sauerbrunn joined a 23-player roster for a training camp ahead of two matches against Colombia in early April. She appeared in both matches, but did not play all 90 minutes in either game. Sauerbrunn was on the roster for another two-game series against Japan in early June and she started in both games.

On July 12, 2016, Sauerbrunn was named to the 18-player team that would represent the United States at the 2016 Olympic Games in Rio de Janeiro. She made her first appearance in Rio on August 3 in the team's opening match against New Zealand. The match marked her first Olympic start and she was subsequently named the Woman of the Match. She also appeared in the second group match against France, helping the United States take away another victory and secure their first place finish in the group. Sauerbrunn played all 90 minutes of the team's final group match against Colombia on August 9, which ended in a 2–2 draw. In the quarterfinals, Sauerbrunn started in the match against Sweden on August 12. The game was tied 1–1 after both regulation time and extra time. The United States were then defeated by Sweden in penalty kicks.

==== 2019 FIFA Women's World Cup ====
In May 2019, she was named to the final 23-player roster for the 2019 FIFA Women's World Cup. Sauerbrunn appeared in 6 of the 7 matches for the USWNT during the tournament, missing only the opening match vs Thailand. The United States went on to defeat the Netherlands 2–0 in the final, winning back-to-back World Cup titles and the fourth overall World Cup title for the United States women's national team.

==== 2023 FIFA Women's World Cup ====
In June 2023, it was announced that Sauerbrunn would miss the 2023 FIFA Women's World Cup with a foot injury she suffered in April.

==== 2024 CONCACAF W Gold Cup ====
Sauerbrunn played in the 2024 CONCACAF W Gold Cup and helped the United States win the title, her eighth CONCACAF championship. She played her last USWNT game on February 26, 2024 during that tournament.

== Organized labor activism ==
In March 2016, Sauerbrunn was one of five women's national team players to file a complaint with the Equal Employment Opportunity Commission alleging wage discrimination as compared to the men's national team.

Sauerbrunn was active in collective bargaining agreement negotiations with U.S. Soccer for several years, from at least the expiration of the previous agreement in December 2016. In February 2017, she was among the players elected to represent the team in negotiations with the federation in April 2017 and continued to be elected to and serve in this executive committee role in subsequent years. On March 4, 2020, the association announced that it had named Sauerbrunn as its first president.

Sauerbrunn represented the players association at the signing of the team's new collective bargaining agreement on September 6, 2022, prior to a national team friendly against Nigeria in Washington, D.C., and gave a speech to the audience where she declared the agreement to be "a huge win for workers and for labor rights".

== Retirement and post-retirement work ==
On December 17, 2024, Sauerbrunn announced her retirement from soccer after a 16-year career. She stated, "Sixteen years ago I woke up dreaming and I haven't slept since. That makes it sound easy. It was never easy. But even so, I'd run it back."

Following retirement, she began co-hosting the podcast "Good Vibes FC" on The Women’s Game channel, and worked as a sideline analyst for TNT Sports.

On September 3, 2026, the Portland Thorns, the club team for which she played her last five years, announced that she had been hired as a Technical Consultant for the remainder of the 2026 season.

== Personal life ==
Since 2011, Sauerbrunn has been in a relationship with Zola Short, a soccer player she met while at the University of Virginia.

Sauerbrunn is a self-described cat lover and has two cats, Missy and Olive, and is also known as a lover of books and reading.

In May 2025, she announced that she was expecting her first child. Sauerbrunn gave birth to her son on October 9, 2025.

== Player statistics ==
=== Club summary ===
†	Denotes seasons in which Sauerbrunn won a NWSL Championship

Club	Season	League					Cup (Note: Includes NWSL Challenge Cups and 2020 NWSL Fall Series)		Continental (Note: Appearances in UEFA Women's Champions League, Women's International Champions Cups, NWSL x Liga MX Femenil Summer Cups, and CONCACAF W Champions Cups)		Total		Ref.
Club	Season	Division	Regular Season		Play-offs		Cup		Continental		Total		Ref.
Club	Season	Division	Apps	Goals	Apps	Goals	Apps	Goals	Apps	Goals	Apps	Goals	Ref.
Boston Renegades	2005	USL W-League	?	?	?	?	—				11	1	
Boston Renegades	Total		?	?	?	?	—				11	1	—
Richmond Kickers Destiny	2006	USL W-League	?	?	?	?	—				?	?	
Richmond Kickers Destiny	2007	USL W-League	?	?	1	1	—				?	?	
Richmond Kickers Destiny	Total		?	?	1 + ?	1 + ?	—				24	3	—
Washington Freedom	2008	USL W-League	6	0	4	0	—				10	0	
Washington Freedom	2009	Women's Professional Soccer	20	1	1	0	—				21	1	
Washington Freedom	Total		26	1	5	0	—				31	1	—
Røa IL (loan)	2009	Toppserien	5	1	—		—		4	0	9	1	
Røa IL (loan)	Total		5	1	—		—		4	0	9	1	—
Washington Freedom	2010	Women's Professional Soccer	24	0	1	0	—				25	0	
Washington Freedom	Total		24	0	1	0	—				25	0	—
magicJack	2011	Women's Professional Soccer	13	0	2	0	—				15	0	
magicJack	Total		13	0	2	0	—				15	0	—
D.C. United	2012	USL W-League	4	1	0	0	—				4	1	
D.C. United	Total		4	1	0	0	—				4	1	—
FC Kansas City	2013	National Women's Soccer League	19	0	1	0	—				20	0	
FC Kansas City	2014 †	National Women's Soccer League	22	1	2	0	—				24	1	
FC Kansas City	2015 †	National Women's Soccer League	11	0	2	0	—				13	0	
FC Kansas City	2016	National Women's Soccer League	14	1	—		—				14	1	
FC Kansas City	2017	National Women's Soccer League	22	1	—		—				22	1	
FC Kansas City	Total		88	3	5	0	—				93	3	—
Utah Royals FC	2018	National Women's Soccer League	20	0	—		—				20	0	
Utah Royals FC	2019	National Women's Soccer League	14	1	—		—				14	1	
Utah Royals FC	Total		34	1	–		—				34	1	—
Portland Thorns FC	2020	National Women's Soccer League	— (Note: 2020 regular season and playoffs cancelled due COVID-19 pandemic)				5	0	—		5	0	
Portland Thorns FC	2021	National Women's Soccer League	15	0	1	0	3	0	1	0	20	0	
Portland Thorns FC	2022 †	National Women's Soccer League	17	1	2	0	0	0	1	0	20	1	
Portland Thorns FC	2023	National Women's Soccer League	9	0	1	0	0	0	–		10	0	
Portland Thorns FC	2024	National Women's Soccer League	25	0	1	0	0	0	3	0	29	0	
Portland Thorns FC	Total		66	1	5	0	8	0	5	0	84	1	—
Career total			260 + ?	8 + ?	19 + ?	1 + ?	8	0	9	0	330	12	—

=== International summary ===
As of match played February 26, 2024

National team	Year	Apps	Goals	Assists
United States
United States	2008	2	0	1
United States	2009	–	–	–
United States	2010	1	0	0
United States	2011	12	0	0
United States	2012	22	0	0
United States	2013	12	0	0
United States	2014	22	0	1
United States	2015	25	0	0
United States	2016	23	0	3
United States	2017	16	0	1
United States	2018	14	0	1
United States	2019	22	0	0
United States	2020	7	0	0
United States	2021	21	0	0
United States	2022	12	0	0
United States	2023	6	0	0
United States	2024	2	0	0
Total		219	0	7

== Honors and awards ==
Røa IL

- Toppserien: 2009

FC Kansas City

- NWSL Championship: 2014, 2015

Portland Thorns FC

- NWSL Community Shield: 2020
- NWSL Challenge Cup: 2021
- International Champions Cup: 2021
- NWSL Shield: 2021
- NWSL Championship: 2022

United States

- FIFA Women's World Cup: 2015, 2019
- CONCACAF Women's Championship: 2010, 2014, 2018, 2022
- CONCACAF W Gold Cup: 2024
- CONCACAF Women's Olympic Qualifying Tournament: 2012, 2016, 2020
- Summer Olympics: Gold Medal: 2012; Bronze Medal: 2020
- SheBelieves Cup: 2016, 2020, 2021, 2022, 2023
- Algarve Cup: 2011, 2013, 2015
- Four Nations Tournament: 2008, 2011
- Nordic Cup: 2007, 2008
- Tournament of Nations: 2018

Individual

- NSCAA Youth All-American: 2001
- NSCAA Adidas (U-17) All-American: 2002
- Parade All-American: 2002, 2003
- Missouri Gatorade Player of the Year: 2003
- Soccer Times All-American Third Team: 2003
- ACC Freshman of the Year: 2003
- ACC All-Freshman Team: 2003
- Soccer Buzz Mid-Atlantic Region Freshman of the Year: 2003
- Soccer Buzz National Freshman of the Year Finalist: 2003
- Soccer Buzz Freshman All-American First Team: 2003
- All-ACC Second Team: 2003, 2005
- Soccer Buzz All-American Second Team: 2003, 2007
- NSCAA All-American First Team: 2003, 2007
- Soccer Buzz All-American Honorable Mention: 2005
- NSCAA All-American Second Team: 2006
- Soccer Buzz All-American Third Team: 2006
- All-ACC First Team: 2006, 2007
- Academic All-American: 2007
- NSCAA Scholar-Athlete of the Year: 2007
- VaSID State Player of the Year: 2007
- ACC Player of the Year: 2007
- ACC All-Tournament Team: 2007
- ACC All-Academic Team: 2005, 2006, 2007
- NSCAA All-Region: 2003, 2005, 2006, 2007
- VaSID First Team All-State: 2003, 2005, 2006, 2007
- ACC Postgraduate Scholarship Award: 2008
- U.S. Soccer Athlete of the Year Nominee: 2015
- BBC Women's Footballer of the Year Nominee: 2016
- IFFHS CONCACAF Woman Team of the Decade 2011–2020
- CONCACAF W Championship Best XI: 2022
- NWSL Defender of the Year: 2013, 2014, 2015, 2019
- NWSL Best XI: 2013, 2014, 2015, 2016, 2017, 2018, 2019
- NWSL Second XI: 2022

== In popular culture ==
Sauerbrunn was featured along with her national teammates in the EA Sports' FIFA video game series in FIFA 16, the first time women players were included in the game. In September 2015, she was ranked by EA Sports as the No. 10 women's player in the game.

Following the United States' win at the 2015 FIFA Women's World Cup, Sauerbrunn and her teammates became the first women's sports team to be honored with a Ticker Tape Parade in New York City. Each player received a key to the city from Mayor Bill de Blasio. In October of the same year, the team was honored by President Barack Obama at the White House.

In April 2016, it was announced that Sauerbrunn would appear in ads and a 225-foot mural in New York for Budweiser.
