= Taylor Lytle =

American soccer player

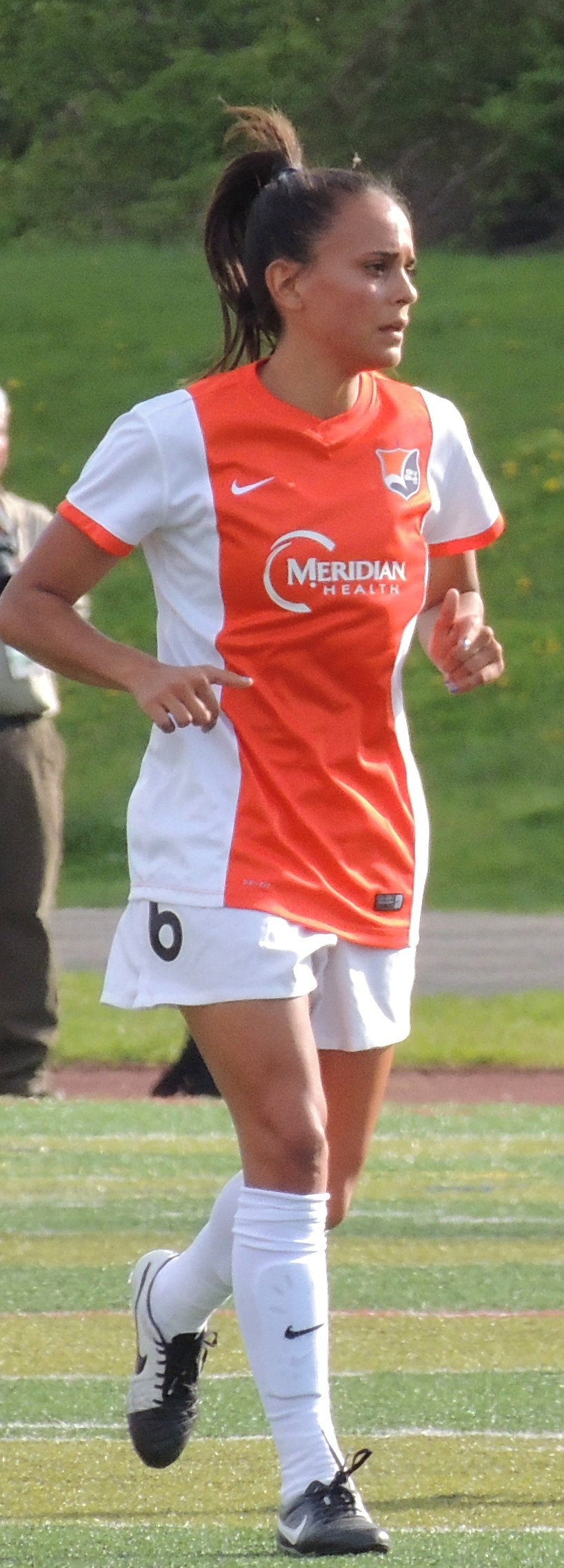
- Lytle playing for Sky Blue FC in 2015

Personal information
- Full name: Taylor Marie Lytle
- Date of birth: March 31, 1989 (age 37)
- Place of birth: Las Cruces, New Mexico, United States
- Height: 5 ft 2 in (1.57 m)
- Position: Midfielder

Youth career
- 2005: Rio Vista FC 89

College career
Years	Team	Apps	(Gls)
2008–2011	Texas Tech Red Raiders	74	(14)

Senior career*
Years	Team	Apps	(Gls)
2012	Pali Blues	1	(0)
2013–2017	Sky Blue FC	82	(5)
2018–2020	Utah Royals	13	(0)

International career
2012	United States U23	3	(1)
- * Club domestic league appearances and goals

Taylor Marie Lytle (born March 31, 1989) is an American former professional soccer player who primarily played as a midfielder.

== Early life ==
Lytle was raised in Las Cruces, New Mexico, where she attended Las Cruces High School. She helped lead the Las Cruces squad to state championship titles in 2003 and 2005 and was named first team All-District and All-State all four years. In 2005, she was named New Mexico State Player and Gatorade Player of the Year as well as NSCAA High School All-American. In 2007, she was named as one of the nation's Top 125 Freshman for the year's recruiting class by Soccer Buzz. She ended her high school career with 78 goals and 81 assists.

Lytle played for Rio Vista FC 89, who were State Champions in 2005 and was a member of the New Mexico State Olympic Development Program (ODP) team. She also participated in multiple U-14 and U-15 national camps.

== Club ==
=== Texas Tech University ===
Lytle attended Texas Tech University majoring in animal science. She played from 2008 to 2011 for the Texas Tech Red Raiders and was named to the Big 12 Conference first team in 2009 and all-second team in 2008 and 2011. During her career she scored 14 goals and 27 assists, the latter a school record. She was team captain in her Junior and Senior seasons.

=== Sky Blue FC ===
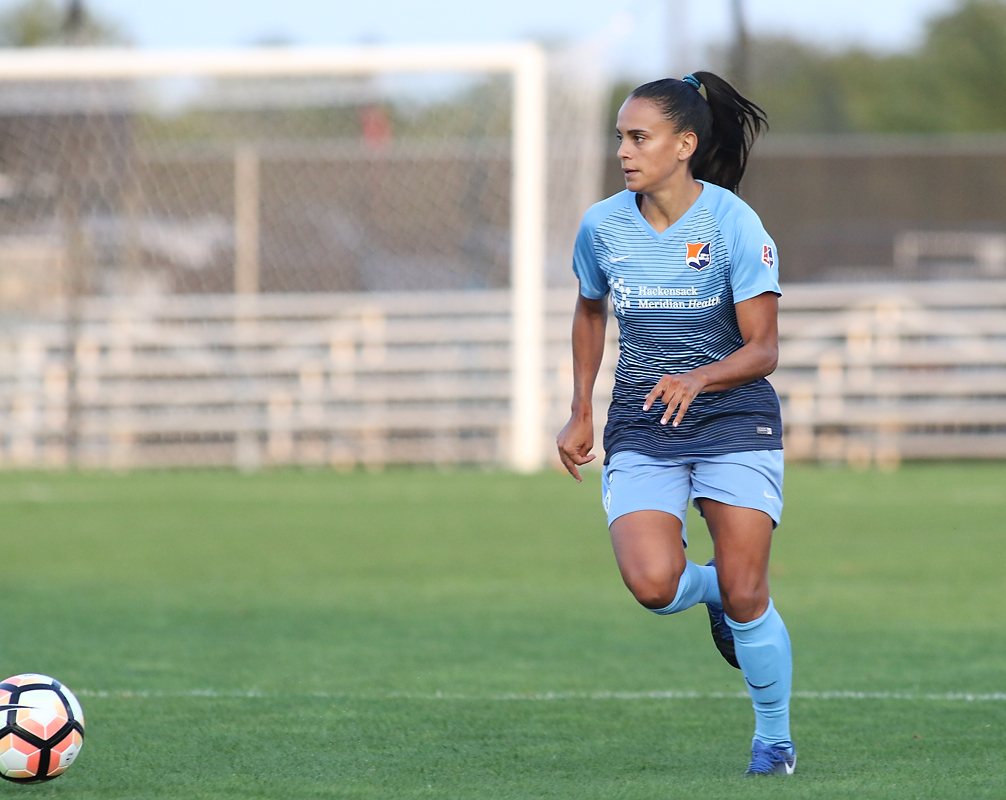
Taylor Lytle playing for Sky Blue FC in 2017

In 2013, she signed as a discovery player with Sky Blue FC in the National Women's Soccer League. Often coming off the bench, Lytle appeared in 21 of Sky Blue's 22 regular season games and scored four goals. On May 16, 2013, Lytle scored her first goal in her Sky Blue FC and National Women's Soccer League career. This goal was scored in the 80th minute of the match, and proved to be the game winner of Sky Blue's 1–0 defeat of then first place team Portland Thorns FC.

Lytle was a substitute in Sky Blue's semi-final loss to the Western New York Flash on August 24, 2013.

In 2014, Lytle played in 7 games, starting in 5, for Sky Blue before suffering a season-ending tibia fracture and lateral meniscus tear on May 11.

Lytle returned to Sky Blue in 2015 and appeared in 15 games. She appeared in 18 games in 2016 and a career high 21 games in 2017.

=== Utah Royals, 2018–2020 ===
On December 29, 2017, Sky Blue traded Lytle and teammate Kelley O'Hara to Utah Royals FC. Lytle appeared in 10 games for the Royals in 2018, she was tied for the team lead with 2 assists.

Lytle returned to Utah for the 2019 season. She suffered a serious foot injury prior to their first match of the season and was placed on the season ending injury list (SEI) and she would miss the entire 2019 season.

== International career ==
Lytle was a member of the U.S. women's national under-23 team in 2012. She came off the bench in each of the three matches of the Under-23 Four Nations Tournament in La Manga Club, Spain and scored one goal.
