= Michelle Maemone =

American soccer player

Personal information
- Full name: Michelle Hope Maemone
- Date of birth: March 18, 1997 (age 29)
- Place of birth: Los Gatos, California, U.S.
- Height: 5 ft 6 in (1.68 m)
- Position: Defender

Team information
- Current team: Kansas City
- Number: 19

Youth career
- Central Valley Arsenal
- MVLA Mercury Black
- The King's Academy

College career
Years	Team	Apps	(Gls)
2015–2018	Pepperdine Waves	78	(3)

Senior career*
Years	Team	Apps	(Gls)
2019–2020	Utah Royals	8	(0)
2021	Kansas City	5	(0)
- * Club domestic league appearances and goals as of 20 July 2022

Michelle Hope Maemone (born March 18, 1997) is a former American soccer player who played as a defender for Kansas City in the National Women's Soccer League (NWSL).

== Early years ==
Maemone was born to Joe and Anita Maemone and grew up in San Jose, California. An early enthusiast of soccer, growing up Maemone played both as a defender and forward for clubs Central Valley Arsenal and MVLA Mercury Black as well as her high school, The King's Academy.

== College career ==
Maemone played four years for the Pepperdine Waves. During her time at Pepperdine she made 78 appearances, 69 as a starter and finished with 3 goals. Maemone was twice named to the WCC Commissioner's Honor Roll "bronze" donors and received an All-WCC honourable mention honouree her sophomore year.

== Professional career ==
=== Utah Royals, 2019-2020 ===
Maemone was drafted by the Utah Royals FC in the third round, 23rd overall, of the 2019 NWSL College Draft. She was signed by the Royals in April 2019. She made her debut for the club as a starter on April 20, 2019, due to injuries to both Becca Moros and Kelley O'Hara. The day prior to her club debut, Maemone had had 101 degree fever.

=== Kansas City NWSL, 2021 ===
After the dissolution of Utah Royals FC, the NWSL awarded all of the team's player rights to the newly created Kansas City NWSL expansion team, including Maemone's. She appeared in five matches for Kansas City, starting two, before she was waived on December 21, 2021.

== Career statistics ==
As of May 3, 2019

League	Club	Season	League			Playoffs		Total	
League	Club	Season	Apps	Goals	Assists	Apps	Goals	Apps	Goals
NCAA	Pepperdine University	2015	19	1	1	-		19	1
NCAA	Pepperdine University	2016	19	0	1	2	0	21	0
NCAA	Pepperdine University	2017	19	0	2	-		19	0
NCAA	Pepperdine University	2018	19	2	0	-		19	2
NCAA	Pepperdine University	total	76	3	4	2	0	78	4
NWSL	Utah Royals FC	2019	3	0	1			3	0
NWSL	Utah Royals FC	total	3	0	1			3	0
