= Brittany Ratcliffe =

American soccer player (born 1994)

- Ratcliffe with the Seattle Reign in 2026

Personal information
- Full name: Brittany Margaret Ratcliffe
- Date of birth: February 7, 1994 (age 32)
- Place of birth: Williamstown, New Jersey, United States
- Height: 5 ft 4 in (1.63 m)
- Position: Forward

Team information
- Current team: Seattle Reign
- Number: 13

College career
Years	Team	Apps	(Gls)
2012–2015	Virginia Cavaliers	93	(24)

Senior career*
Years	Team	Apps	(Gls)
2016	Boston Breakers	15	(0)
2017	FC Kansas City	21	(1)
2018–2020	Utah Royals	10	(2)
2021	Kansas City	0	(0)
2021–2023	North Carolina Courage	30	(3)
2024–2025	Washington Spirit	37	(4)
2026–	Seattle Reign	28	(4)
- * Club domestic league appearances and goals as of 16:38, November 8, 2026 (UTC)

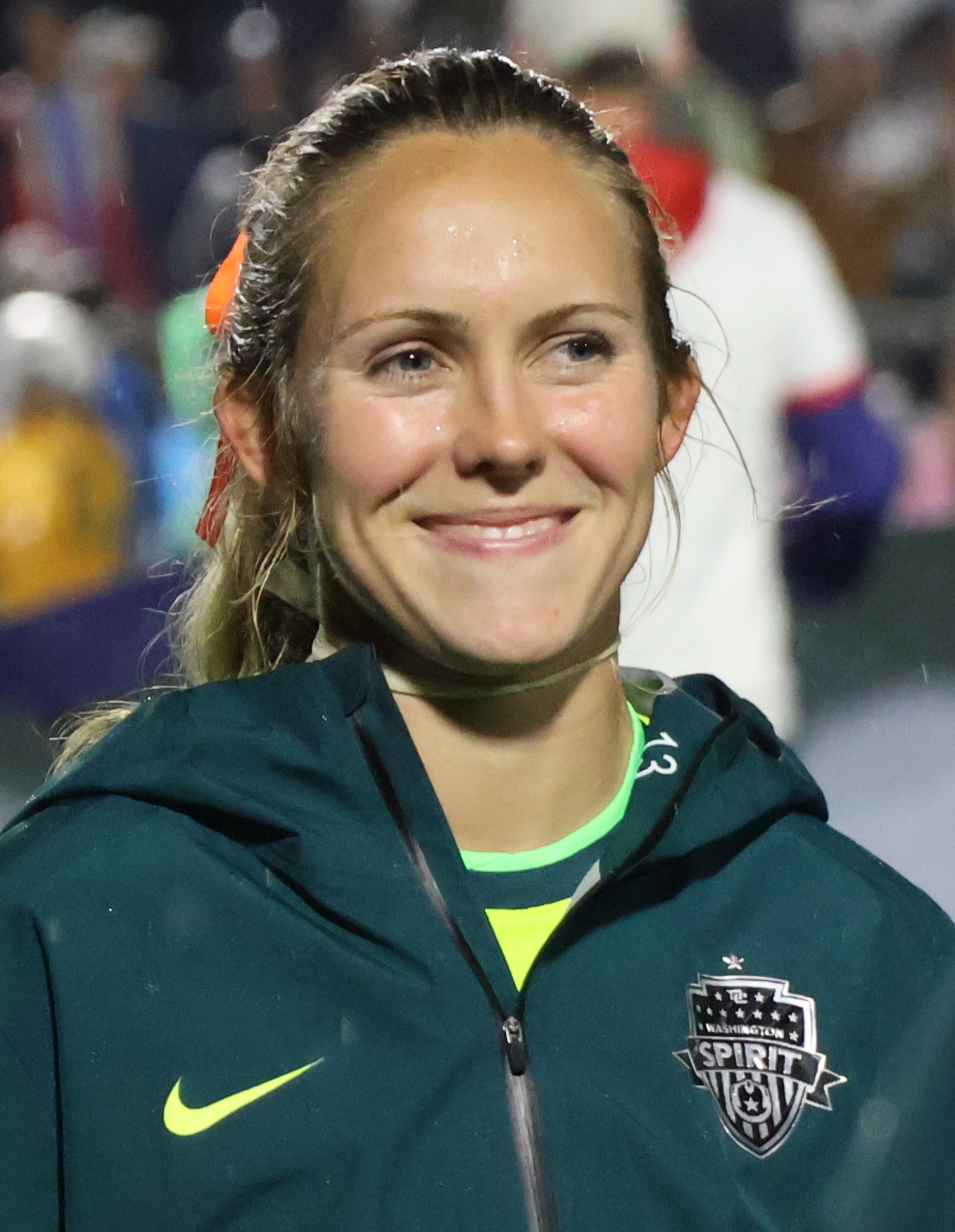
Ratcliffe with the Washington Spirit in 2025

Brittany Margaret Ratcliffe (born February 7, 1994) is an American professional soccer player who plays as a forward for Seattle Reign FC of the National Women's Soccer League (NWSL). She played college soccer for the Virginia Cavaliers and was drafted by the Boston Breakers in the second round of the 2016 NWSL College Draft. She also played for FC Kansas City, Utah Royals, the North Carolina Courage, and the Washington Spirit.

== Early life ==
Raised in the Williamstown section of Monroe Township, Gloucester County, New Jersey, Ratcliffe played soccer at Paul VI High School.

Ratcliffe played for the University of Virginia. She appeared in 93 matches throughout her career there.

== Club career ==
Ratcliffe was drafted by Boston Breakers in the 2nd round of the 2016 NWSL College Draft. She signed with Boston in April 2016 and made 15 appearances and 5 starts that season. Boston later waived Ratcliffe in February 2017.

Ratcliffe spent the 2017 preseason with the Chicago Red Stars; after she didn't make their final roster she signed with FC Kansas City on April 14.

After FC Kansas City ceased operations following the 2017 season, Ratcliffe was officially added to the roster of the Utah Royals FC on February 8, 2018. On June 16, she scored a stoppage-time goal to secure a 1–0 road win over the league-leading North Carolina Courage, their only loss of the season; her goal was voted NWSL Goal of the Week.

Ratcliffe signed with the North Carolina Courage in 2021.

On January 11, 2024, Ratcliffe signed a three-year contract with the Washington Spirit after entering free agency.

In January 2026, after leaving the Spirit by mutual contract termination, Ratcliffe signed with Seattle Reign FC on a one-year deal with the mutual option for another year, which was picked up. She made a goalscoring debut for the Reign on March 15, heading in the 2–1 winner over the Orlando Pride on the first day of the season.

== Honors and awards ==
North Carolina Courage

- NWSL Challenge Cup: 2022, 2023

Washington Spirit

- NWSL Challenge Cup: 2025

Individual

- Third-team All-ACC: 2014, 2015
