= 2017 FC Kansas City season =

FC Kansas City
2017 season
- Owner: Elam Baer
- Head coach: Vlatko Andonovski
- Stadium: Swope Soccer Village
- Average home league attendance: 2,162
Home colors	Away colors

The 2017 season was the fifth and final season for FC Kansas City, which had competed in the National Women's Soccer League, the top division of women's professional soccer in the United States, since the league's launch in 2013. FC Kansas City folded after the 2017 season and was replaced in the league by a new side owned by Major League Soccer club Real Salt Lake.

== Current squad ==
As of June 14, 2017

No.	Position	Nation	Player
2	FW	(United States) USA	Shea Groom
3	DF	(United States) USA	Becca Moros
4	DF	(United States) USA	Becky Sauerbrunn (Captain)
5	DF	(United States) USA	Alex Arlitt
6	DF	(New Zealand) NZL	Katie Bowen
7	MF	(United States) USA	Mandy Laddish
8	FW	(United States) USA	Amy Rodriguez
9	MF	(United States) USA	Lo'eau LaBonta
10	MF	(United States) USA	Yael Averbuch
11	MF	(Canada) CAN	Desiree Scott
13	DF	(United States) USA	Brittany Taylor
14	FW	(United States) USA	Sydney Leroux
15	MF	(United States) USA	Erika Tymrak
18	GK	(United States) USA	Nicole Barnhart (Vice-Captain)
19	GK	(United States) USA	Cat Parkhill
21	MF	(United States) USA	Caroline Flynn
22	DF	(Dominican Republic) DOM	Brianne Reed
25	FW	(United States) USA	Brittany Ratcliffe
31	DF	(United States) USA	Christina Gibbons
44	FW	(Canada) CAN	Maegan Kelly
88	MF	(United States) USA	Alexa Newfield

== Head coach ==
- (North Macedonia) Vlatko Andonovski (2013–2017)

== Results ==
Win Draw Loss

=== Preseason ===
Sun, Mar 19 1	University of Missouri	0–7	FC Kansas City	Columbia, Missouri
				Stadium: Audrey J Walton Stadium

Sat, Apr 1 2	University of Nebraska	1–2	FC Kansas City	Lincoln, Nebraska
				Stadium: Barbara Hibner Soccer Stadium

Mon, Apr 10 3	University of Kansas	1–3	FC Kansas City	Lawrence, Kansas
				Stadium: Rock Chalk Park

=== Regular season ===
Sun Apr 16 1	FC Kansas City	2–0	Boston Breakers	Kansas City, Missouri
	Leroux 7' (Sauerbrunn); Rodriguez 48' (Groom)	Report	Chapman (yellow card) 37'; White (yellow card) 60'	Stadium: Children’s Mercy Victory Field; Attendance: 3,340; Referee: Chris Spivey

Sat Apr 22 2	Chicago Red Stars	1–0	FC Kansas City	Bridgeview, Illinois
	Ertz 41' (Huerta)	Report		Stadium: Toyota Park; Attendance: 2,153; Referee: Greg Dopka

Sun Apr 30 3	Sky Blue FC	1–0	FC Kansas City	Piscataway, New Jersey
	Rodriguez (yellow card) 74' (goal) 83' (Freeman); Tiernan (yellow card) 90+1'	Report		Stadium: Yurcak Field; Attendance: 2,562; Referee: Kevin Broadley

Sun May 7 4	FC Kansas City	1–1	Orlando Pride	Kansas City, Missouri
	Leroux (yellow card) 45+1'; Tymrak 84'	Report	Evans (yellow card) 60'; Marta 73' (Spencer)	Stadium: Children’s Mercy Victory Field; Attendance: 2,514; Referee: Marco Vega

Sat May 13 5	FC Kansas City	0–0	Portland Thorns FC	Kansas City, Missouri
	Moros (yellow card) 74'	Report		Stadium: Children’s Mercy Victory Field; Attendance: 1,796; Referee: Karen Abt

Sat May 20 6	Washington Spirit	0–1	FC Kansas City	Boyds, Maryland
	Ordega (yellow card) 84'	Report	Newfield 39' (Leroux); Sauerbrunn (yellow card) 48'	Stadium: Maureen Hendricks Field at the Maryland SoccerPlex; Attendance: 3,714; Referee: Guido Gonzalez

Sat May 27 7	FC Kansas City	3–2	Washington Spirit	Kansas City, Missouri
	Newfield (yellow card) 15' (yellow-red card) 70'; Leroux 9' (Ratcliffe), 27' (Grooom); Sauerbrunn 60' (Newfield); Taylor (yellow card) 89'	Report	Mewis 4'; Dougherty Howard (yellow card) 38'; Solaun 83' (Ordega); Ordega (yellow card) 86'	Stadium: Children’s Mercy Victory Field; Attendance: 1,728; Referee: Rosendo Mendoza

Sat Jun 3 8	North Carolina Courage	2–0	FC Kansas City	Cary, North Carolina
	Hatch (yellow card) 13' (goal) 67' (Williams); Zerboni (yellow card) 57' (goal) 60' (Erceg)	Report	Sauerbrunn (yellow card) 43'	Stadium: Sahlen’s Stadium at WakeMed Soccer Park; Attendance: 3,717; Referee: Christina Unkel

Sun Jun 17 9	FC Kansas City	2–2	Seattle Reign FC	Kansas City, Missouri
7:30 p.m. CT	Newfield 23' (Tymrak); Groom (yellow card) 76'; Kelly 84' (Averbuch); Leroux (yellow card) 90'		Rapinoe 31' (Kawasumi); Elston (yellow card) 73'; Pickett (yellow card) 74'; Kawasumi 81' (Nairn)	Stadium: Swope Soccer Village; Attendance: 1,891; Referee: Farhad Dadkho

Sat Jun 24 10	Seattle Reign FC	1–1	FC Kansas City	Seattle, Washington
7:00 p.m. PT	Barnes (red card) 4'; Kawasumi 58'	Report	Ratcliffe 16' (Newfield); Newfield (yellow card) 30'; Groom (yellow card) 34'	Stadium: Memorial Stadium; Attendance: 3,919; Referee: Katja Koroleva

Wed Jun 28 11	Portland Thorns FC	3–0	FC Kansas City	Portland, Oregon
7:00 p.m. PT	Sinclair 15', 75' (Raso) (yellow card) 71'; Horan (yellow card) 52'; Raso 32' (Horan) (yellow card) 66'	Report	Newfield (yellow card) 54'; Ratcliffe (yellow card) 83'; Kelly (yellow card) 90+2'	Stadium: Providence Park; Attendance: 16,199; Referee: Chipalo Street

Sun Jul 2 12	FC Kansas City	1–2	Houston Dash	Kansas City, Missouri
7:00 p.m. CT	LaBonta (yellow card) 35' (yellow-red card) 62'; Groom 45+1' (Gibbons); Gibbons (yellow card) 52'	Report	Lloyd (yellow card) 52'; Daly 55'; Prince 64' (Brooks)	Stadium: Children’s Mercy Victory Field; Attendance: 1,703; Referee: Karen Abt

Sat Jul 8 13	Sky Blue FC	3–2	FC Kansas City	Piscataway, New Jersey
7:00 p.m. ET	Skroski (yellow card) 45+4'; Kerr 78' (O'Hara), 81' (Corboz), 90' (Lytle)	Report	Bowen 29' (Gibbons); Gibbons 42' (Scott); Groom (red card) 45+4'	Stadium: Yurcak Field; Attendance: 2,091; Referee: Amber O'Connor

Sat Jul 15 14	Orlando Pride	4–1	FC Kansas City	Orlando, Florida
7:30 p.m. ET	Kennedy 22' (Marta); Morgan 38' (pen.); Weatherholt (yellow card) 45'; Pressley 70' (Camila); Edmonds 75'	Report	Kelly 65' (Bowen); Gibbons (yellow card) 88'	Stadium: Orlando City Stadium; Attendance: 6,073; Referee: Greg Dopka

Thur Aug 10 15	FC Kansas City	0–1	North Carolina Courage	Kansas City, Missouri
7:00 p.m. CT	LaBonta (yellow card) 45'	Report	Williams 86'	Stadium: Children’s Mercy Victory Field; Attendance: 1,398; Referee: Jose Lara

Fri Aug 4 16	Boston Breakers	2–2	FC Kansas City	Boston, Massachusetts
7:00 p.m. ET	White 26' (Stengel), 30' (Leon)	Report	Kelly 21' (Gibbons); Tymrak 81' (Miramontez)	Stadium: Jordan Field; Attendance: 2,510; Referee: Lorant Varga

Sun Aug 13 17	Houston Dash	0–1	FC Kansas City	Houston, Texas
7:30 p.m. CT	Brooks (yellow card) 63'	Report	Groom 83' (Sauerbrunn)	Stadium: BBVA Compass Stadium; Attendance: 4,352; Referee: Robi Hullner

Wed Aug 16 18	FC Kansas City	2–1	Portland Thorns FC	Kansas City, Missouri
7:00 p.m. CT	Averbuch 65'; Leroux 69' (Ratcliffe)	Report	Henry 44' (pen.)	Stadium: Children’s Mercy Victory Field; Attendance: 428; Referee: Marco Vega

Sun Aug 20 19	Chicago Red Stars	1–3	FC Kansas City	Bridgeview, Illinois
5:00 p.m. CT	Short (yellow card) 26'; Ertz 64' (Nagasato); Naeher (yellow card) 90+3'	Report	Leroux 23' (Groom); Bowen 29' (Groom); Groom (yellow card) 45'; Kelly 80' (LaBonta)	Stadium: Toyota Park; Attendance: 3,314; Referee: Karen Abt

Sat Aug 26 20	FC Kansas City	1–2	Orlando Pride	Kansas City, Missouri
2:30 p.m. CT	LaBonta 42' (Groom)	Report	Ubogagu 16'; Camila (yellow card) 45'; Morgan 87' (Marta)	Stadium: Children’s Mercy Victory Field; Attendance: 2,812; Referee: Danielle Chesky

Sun Sep 3 21	FC Kansas City	4–1	Sky Blue FC	Kansas City, Missouri
5:00 p.m. CT	LaBonta 39' (Groom); Groom 44' (LaBonta), 64'; Leroux 90+4' (Kelly)	Report	Tiernan 83' (Lytle)	Stadium: Children’s Mercy Victory Field; Attendance: 1,571; Referee: Luis Guardia

Sat Sep 8 22	FC Kansas City	0–0	Chicago Red Stars	Kansas City, Missouri
2:30 p.m. CT	LaBonta (yellow card) 66'	Report		Stadium: Children’s Mercy Victory Field; Attendance: 963; Referee: Michael Radchuk

Sun Sep 24 23	Seattle Reign	0–1	FC Kansas City	Seattle, Washington
6:00 p.m. PT	Rapinoe (yellow card) 69'	Report	Groom 23' (Leroux)	Stadium: Memorial Stadium (Seattle); Attendance: 4,991; Referee: Karen Abt

Fri Sep 29 24	FC Kansas City	1–1	Houston Dash	Kansas City, Missouri
7:00 p.m. CT	Kelly 9' (Scott) (yellow card) 63'; Shea Groom (yellow card) 71'	Report	Benites (yellow card) 48'; Roccaro (yellow card) 51'; Daly 53' (Mewis)	Stadium: Children’s Mercy Victory Field; Attendance: 1,312; Referee: Lukasz Szpala
