= 2016 FC Kansas City season =

FC Kansas City
2016 season
- Owner: Brian Budzinski, Chris Likens, Brad Likens, Greg Likens
- Head coach: Vlatko Andonovski
- Stadium: Swope Soccer Village
- National Women's Soccer League: 6th
- NWSL Playoffs: Did not qualify
- Top goalscorer: Shea Groom (6)
- Highest home attendance: 8,022 (Apr. 16 vs. Western New York)
- Lowest home attendance: 2,013 (July 16 vs. Washington)
- Average home league attendance: 3,162
Home colors	Away colors	Third colors

The 2016 season was FC Kansas City's fourth season. The team competes in the National Women's Soccer League, the top division of women's soccer in the United States.

== First-team squad ==
Note: Flags indicate national team as defined under FIFA eligibility rules; some limited exceptions apply. Players may hold more than one non-FIFA nationality.

No.	Pos.	Nation	Player
0	GK	(United States) USA	Katelyn Rowland
2	FW	(United States) USA	Shea Groom
4	DF	(United States) USA	Becky Sauerbrunn
5	FW	(United States) USA	Liz Bogus
6	MF	(United States) USA	Jen Buczkowski
7	DF	(United States) USA	Meghan Lisenby
8	FW	(United States) USA	Amy Rodriguez
9	MF	(United States) USA	Heather O'Reilly
10	MF	(United States) USA	Kaysie Clark
11	FW	(United States) USA	Frances Silva
13	DF	(United States) USA	Brittanny Taylor

No.	Pos.	Nation	Player
14	MF	(United States) USA	Yael Averbuch
15	MF	(United States) USA	Erika Tymrak
17	DF	(United States) USA	Amanda Frisbie
18	GK	(United States) USA	Nicole Barnhart
20	MF	(United States) USA	Tiffany McCarty
21	MF	(New Zealand) NZL	Katie Bowen
22	FW	(United States) USA	Sydney Leroux
23	FW	(United States) USA	Caroline Kastor
25	MF	(United States) USA	Mandy Laddish
—	MF	(Canada) CAN	Desiree Scott

== Match results ==
Win Draw Loss

=== Preseason ===
FC Kansas City announced their preseason schedule on February 24, 2016.

Sun, March 20 1	UMKC Kangaroos	0–7	FC Kansas City	Kansas City, Missouri
1:00pm CT		Report	Clark 12'; Newfield 28' (pen.); Kastor 34', 45'; McCarty 37'; Menchel 43'; Ayers 72'	Stadium: Durwood Soccer Stadium

Mon, March 21 2	Missouri Tigers	1–3	FC Kansas City	Columbia, Missouri
5:30pm CT	Donaldson 22'	Report	O'Reilly 16', 30', 64'; Laddish (yellow card) 38'	Stadium: Audrey J. Walton Stadium

Sat, March 26 3	Kansas Jayhawks	0–3	FC Kansas City	Lawrence, Kansas
12:00pm CT		Report	Groom 7', 63'; Tymrak 16'	Stadium: Rock Chalk Park

Sun, April 3 4	Nebraska Cornhuskers	0–4	FC Kansas City	Lincoln, Nebraska
3:00pm CT		Report	Silva 14'; Groom 32', 72'; Frisbie 37'	Stadium: Barbara Hibner Soccer Stadium

Sat, April 9 5	UMKC Kangaroos	0–2	FC Kansas City	Kansas City, Missouri
1:00pm CT		Report	Groom 38'; Averbuch 45'	Stadium: Durwood Soccer Stadium
Note: 45-minute game

Sat, April 9 6	FC Kansas City	1–0	Minnesota Golden Gophers	Kansas City, Missouri
2:00pm CT	Silva 43'	Report		Stadium: Durwood Soccer Stadium
Note: 45-minute game

=== National Women's Soccer League ===
==== Regular season ====
On February 18, NWSL announced the 2016 season schedule.

April 16 1	FC Kansas City	0–1	Western New York Flash	Kansas City, Missouri
7:30 p.m. CT	Heather O'Reilly (yellow card) 74'	Report	Sam Mewis 71' (pen.)	Stadium: Children's Mercy Park; Attendance: 8,022; Referee: Farhad Dadkho

April 23 2	FC Kansas City	1–1	Portland Thorns FC	Kansas City, Missouri
7:30 p.m. CT	Shea Groom 30' (Heather O'Reilly), (yellow card) 41' (yellow-red card) 47'	FCKC Report; POR Report	Lindsey Horan 78' (Tobin Heath)	Stadium: Swope Soccer Village; Attendance: 3,022; Referee: Danielle Chesky

May 1 3	Seattle Reign FC	1–0	FC Kansas City	Seattle, Washington
6:00 p.m. CT	Kim Little 56'; Lindsay Elston (yellow card) 90+'	Boxscore; Report		Stadium: Memorial Stadium; Attendance: 4,083; Referee: Greg Dopka

May 7 4	FC Kansas City	1–2	Houston Dash	Kansas City, Missouri
7:30 p.m. CT	Yael Averbuch 87' (pen.)	Report; Boxscore	Rachel Daly (yellow card) 45+2'; Denise O'Sullivan 56' (Chioma Ubogagu); Chioma Ubogagu 71' (Rachel Daly); Ellie Brush (yellow card) 82'	Stadium: Swope Soccer Village; Attendance: 3,282; Referee: Farhad Dadkho

May 13 5	FC Kansas City	0–0	Chicago Red Stars	Kansas City, Missouri
7:30 p.m. CT		Report; Report; Box score	Samantha Johnson (yellow card) 39'	Stadium: Swope Soccer Village; Attendance: 2,217; Referee: Chipalo Street

May 22 6	Boston Breakers	1–0	FC Kansas City	Boston, Massachusetts
5:30 p.m. CT	Whitney Engen 19' (Kristie Mewis); Whitney Engen (yellow card) 91+'	Report		Stadium: Jordan Field; Attendance: 3,288; Referee: Chris Spivey

May 28 7	FC Kansas City	2–0	Orlando Pride	Kansas City, Missouri
7:30 p.m. CT	Yael Averbuch 53'; Erika Tymrak 77'	Report		Stadium: Swope Soccer Village; Attendance: 3,104; Referee: Margaret Domka

June 11 8	Sky Blue FC	1–1	FC Kansas City	Piscataway, New Jersey
6:00 p.m. CT	Sarah Killion 30' (pen.)	Report	Shea Groom 27' (Erika Tymrak)	Stadium: Yurcak Field; Attendance: 2,754; Referee: Karen Abt

June 19 9	Houston Dash	0–1	FC Kansas City	Houston, Texas
7:30 p.m. CT	Cari Roccaro (yellow card) 89'	Report	Becky Sauerbrunn 80'	Stadium: BBVA Compass Stadium; Attendance: 4,570; Referee: Matthew Franz

June 25 10	FC Kansas City	0–0	Seattle Reign FC	Kansas City, Missouri
6:00 p.m. CT	Desiree Scott (yellow card) 59'; Becky Sauerbrunn (yellow card) 90+'	Report	Rachel Corsie (yellow card) 18'; Carson Pickett (yellow card) 90'	Stadium: Swope Soccer Village; Attendance: 3,041; Referee: Greg Dopka

July 2 11	Washington Spirit	2–0	FC Kansas City	Boyds, Maryland
6:00 p.m. CT	Francisca Ordega 79'; Tori Huster 85'	Report		Stadium: Maryland SoccerPlex; Attendance: 3,036; Referee: Karen Abt

July 9 12	Portland Thorns FC	1–2	FC Kansas City	Portland, Oregon
7:30 p.m. CT	Kat Williamson 76'	Report	Shea Groom 23Tiffany McCarty'; Brianne Reed (yellow card) 51'; Shea Groom 54' (Tiffany McCarty); Yael Averbuch 90+'	Stadium: Providence Park; Attendance: 16,942; Referee: Farhad Dadkho

July 16 13	FC Kansas City	2–3	Washington Spirit	Kansas City, Missouri
6:00 p.m. CT	Lo'eau LaBonta (yellow card) 28'; Frances Silva 69' (Erika Tymrak); Shea Groom (yellow card) 78' (goal) 90+1'	Report	Estefania Banini 45+2'; Joanna Lohman 58'; Caprice Dydasco (yellow card) 62'; Shea Groom (yellow card) 78'; Estefania Banini 83'	Stadium: Swope Soccer Village; Attendance: 2,013; Referee: Elvis Mahmutovic

July 23 14	Western New York Flash	0–1	FC Kansas City	Rochester, New York
6:00 p.m. CT		Report	Shea Groom 60' (Tiffany McCarty)	Stadium: Sahlen's Stadium; Attendance: 3,556; Referee: Margaret Domka

July 30 15	Chicago Red Stars	1–0	FC Kansas City	Bridgeview, Illinois
7:00 p.m. CT	Stephanie McCaffrey 53' (unassisted)	Report		Stadium: Toyota Park; Attendance: 2,550; Referee: Andrew Musashe

August 28 16	FC Kansas City	0–2	Boston Breakers	Kansas City, Missouri
5:00 p.m. CT		Report	Katie Schoepfer 38' (Brooke Elby); Kristie Mewis 81' (unassisted)	Stadium: Swope Soccer Village; Attendance: 2,206; Referee: Christina Unkel

September 4 17	FC Kansas City	2–1	Sky Blue FC	Kansas City, Missouri
5:00 p.m. CT	Tiffany McCarty 46+' (unassisted); Yael Averbuch 85' (unassisted)	Report	Samantha Kerr 40' (Leah Galton)	Stadium: Swope Soccer Village; Attendance: 2,414; Referee: Victor Rivas

September 7 18	Chicago Red Stars	2–3	FC Kansas City	Bridgeview, Illinois
6:00 p.m. CT	Christen Press 13' (Taylor Comeau); Sofia Huerta 87' (Arin Gilliland); Julie Johnston (yellow card) 93+'	Report	Shea Groom 7' (Heather O'Reilly); Frances Silva 62' (Tiffany McCarty); Shea Groom 77' (Caroline Kastor)	Stadium: Toyota Park; Attendance: 2,068; Referee: Farhad Dadkho

September 11 19	FC Kansas City	0–0	Chicago Red Stars	Kansas City, Missouri
5:00 p.m. CT		Report		Stadium: Swope Soccer Village; Attendance: 2,303; Referee: Ekaterina Koroleva

September 24 20	Orlando Pride	1–2	FC Kansas City	Orlando, Florida
4:00 p.m. CT	Jasmyne Spencer 16' (unassisted)	Report	Tiffany McCarty 47' (unassisted); Alex Arlitt (yellow card) 80'; Heather O'Reilly 84' (penalty); Frances Silva (yellow card) 91+'	Stadium: Camping World Stadium; Attendance: 7,454; Referee: Margaret Domka

==== Postseason playoff ====
FC Kansas City ended in 6th position on regular season and did not qualify for the 2016 NWSL playoffs.

==== Regular-season standings ====
Pos	Team	Pld	W	D	L	GF	GA	GD	Pts	Qualification
1	Portland Thorns FC	20	12	5	3	35	19	+16	41	NWSL Shield
2	Washington Spirit	20	12	3	5	30	21	+9	39	NWSL Playoffs
3	Chicago Red Stars	20	9	6	5	24	20	+4	33	NWSL Playoffs
4	Western New York Flash (C)	20	9	5	6	40	26	+14	32	NWSL Playoffs
5	Seattle Reign FC	20	8	6	6	29	21	+8	30	
6	FC Kansas City	20	7	5	8	18	20	−2	26	
7	Sky Blue FC	20	7	5	8	24	30	−6	26	
8	Houston Dash	20	6	4	10	29	29	0	22	
9	Orlando Pride	20	6	1	13	20	30	−10	19	
10	Boston Breakers	20	3	2	15	14	47	−33	11	

Source: NWSL
Rules for classification: Tiebreakers
(C) Champions

Results summary

Overall								Home						Away					
Pld	W	D	L	GF	GA	GD	Pts	W	D	L	GF	GA	GD	W	D	L	GF	GA	GD
20	7	5	8	18	20	−2	26	2	4	4	8	10	−2	5	1	4	10	10	0

Last updated: September 24, 2016.
Source: Match reports

Results by round

Round	1	2	3	4	5	6	7	8	9	10	11	12	13	14	15	16	17	18	19	20
Stadium	H	H	A	H	H	A	H	A	A	H	A	A	H	A	A	H	H	A	H	A
Result	L	D	L	L	D	L	W	D	W	D	L	W	L	W	L	L	W	W	D	W

Updated to match(es) played on September 24, 2016. Source: Match reports
A = Away; H = Home; W = Win; D = Draw; L = Loss

== Squad statistics ==
Source: NWSL

N	Pos	Player	GP	GS	Min	G	A	PK	Shot	SOG	SOG%	Cro	CK	Off	Foul	FS	YC	RC
5	DF	Alex Arlitt	11	8	710	0	0	0	2	0	0%	0	0	0	4	3	1	0
10	MF	Yael Averbuch	20	20	1788	3	0	1	18	8	44%	1	4	1	19	9	1	0
18	GK	Nicole Barnhart	20	20	1800	0	0	0	1	1	100%	0	0	0	0	2	0	0
21	DF	Katie Bowen	13	11	959	0	1	0	4	2	50%	1	0	0	13	5	0	0
6	MF	Jen Buczkowski	5	5	427	0	0	0	4	3	75%	0	0	0	3	3	0	0
17	DF	Amanda Frisbie	3	3	270	0	0	0	1	0	0%	1	2	0	1	0	0	0
2	FW	Shea Groom	19	19	1659	8	0	0	48	25	52%	4	1	19	31	18	2	1
23	FW	Caroline Kastor	5	3	289	0	2	0	4	1	25%	0	0	2	5	0	0	0
1	FW	Lo'eau LaBonta	10	7	690	0	0	0	9	1	11%	0	0	0	6	4	1	0
7	MF	Mandy Laddish	19	19	1676	0	0	0	22	9	41%	0	0	3	15	12	0	0
20	FW	Tiffany McCarty	16	10	923	2	4	0	17	4	24%	2	0	14	18	12	0	0
24	MF	Molly Menchel	3	2	185	0	0	0	0	0	—	1	2	0	4	1	1	0
88	MF	Alexa Newfield	8	2	238	0	0	0	4	2	50%	0	3	0	4	4	0	0
9	MF	Heather O'Reilly	14	14	1209	1	2	1	29	13	45%	9	50	9	12	14	2	0
22	DF	Brianne Reed	7	5	441	0	0	0	0	0	—	1	0	0	5	4	1	0
4	DF	Becky Sauerbrunn	14	14	1260	1	0	0	2	1	50%	0	0	0	6	5	1	0
3	DF	Desiree Scott	14	14	1260	0	0	0	5	2	40%	1	0	0	16	10	2	0
11	FW	Frances Silva	19	10	990	2	0	0	15	7	47%	1	0	5	15	16	1	0
13	DF	Brittany Taylor	20	20	1800	0	0	0	14	4	29%	1	0	0	10	8	0	0
15	MF	Erika Tymrak	17	14	1166	1	2	0	18	7	39%	2	22	3	10	22	0	0
16	MF	Tiffany Weimer	4	0	17	0	0	0	0	0	—	0	0	0	0	0	0	0
Team Total			20	—	19757	18	11	2	217	90	41%	25	84	56	197	152	13	1

N	Pos	Goal keeper	GP	GS	Min	GA	GA/G	PKA	PKF	Shot	SOG	Sav	Sav%	YC	RC
18	GK	Nicole Barnhart	20	20	1800	20	1.00	2	2	215	103	83	81%	0	0
Team total			20	—	1800	20	1.00	2	2	215	103	83	81%	0	0
