= 2020 Houston Dash season =

Houston Dash
2020 season
- Head coach: James Clarkson
- Stadium: BBVA Stadium
- 2020 NWSL Challenge Cup: Winners
Home colors	Away colors

The 2020 Houston Dash season was the team's seventh season as an American professional women's soccer team in the National Women's Soccer League.

On January 6, 2020, the Dash traded team captain Kealia Ohai to the Chicago Red Stars, Ohai had been a member of the Dash since their inaugural season and is the team's all-time leading scorer.

== Competitions ==
Due to the COVID-19 pandemic the NWSL did not hold a regular season as originally scheduled. The season was replaced by the 2020 NWSL Challenge Cup in July and the Fall Series in September and October.

=== 2020 NWSL Challenge Cup ===
Houston won the NWSL Challenge Cup after defeating the Chicago Red Stars 2–0 in the Championship Game. Dash forward Rachel Daly was named the Challenge Cup MVP.

Pos	Team	Pld	W	D	L	GF	GA	GD	Pts
1	North Carolina Courage	4	4	0	0	7	1	+6	12
2	Washington Spirit	4	2	1	1	4	4	0	7
3	OL Reign	4	1	2	1	1	2	−1	5
4	Houston Dash	4	1	1	2	5	6	−1	4
5	Utah Royals FC (H)	4	1	1	2	4	5	−1	4
6	Chicago Red Stars	4	1	1	2	2	3	−1	4 (Note: Chicago Red Stars won the tiebreaker against Sky Blue FC on fewer yellow cards (1 to 4).)
7	Sky Blue FC	4	1	1	2	2	3	−1	4
8	Portland Thorns FC	4	0	3	1	2	3	−1	3

Source: NWSL
Rules for classification: Tiebreakers
(H) Host
Notes:

Preliminary round

June 30, 2020	Houston Dash	3–3	Utah Royals FC	Herriman, Utah
10:30	Daly 45+1', 47'; Groom 67'	Report	Matheson 35'; Boquete 82'; King 89'	Stadium: Zions Bank Stadium; Attendance: Behind closed doors Referee: Karen Abt

July 4, 2020	Houston Dash	2–0	OL Reign	Herriman, Utah
20:00	Mewis 12'; Groom 54'	Report		Stadium: Zions Bank Stadium; Attendance: Behind closed doors Referee: Lukasz Szpala

July 8, 2020	Sky Blue FC	2–0	Houston Dash	Herriman, Utah
20:00	Monaghan 17'; Kawasumi 34'	Report		Stadium: Zions Bank Stadium; Attendance: Behind closed doors Referee: Tori Penso

July 12, 2020	Washington Spirit	1–0	Houston Dash	Herriman, Utah
10:30	Feist 16'	Report		Stadium: Zions Bank Stadium; Attendance: Behind closed doors Referee: Katja Koroleva

Knockout round

July 17 Quarter-final	Houston Dash	0–0 (3–2 p)	Utah Royals FC	Herriman, Utah
20:00		Report		Stadium: Zions Bank Stadium; Attendance: Behind closed doors
	Penalties
	Schmidt (penalty scored); Nairn (penalty scored); Daly (penalty scored); Visalli (penalty missed)		(penalty missed) Rodriguez; (penalty scored) LaBonta; (penalty missed) Corsie; (penalty scored) King; (penalty missed) Boquete

July 22 Semi-final	Houston Dash	1–0	Portland Thorns FC	Sandy, Utah
10:30	Daly 69'	Report		Stadium: Rio Tinto Stadium; Attendance: Behind closed doors

July 26 Final	Houston Dash	2–0	Chicago Red Stars	Sandy, Utah
10:30	Schmidt 5' (pen.); Groom 90+1'	Report		Stadium: Rio Tinto Stadium; Attendance: Behind closed doors Referee: Katja Koroleva

=== Fall Series ===
The Dash would be without Challenge Cup MVP Rachel Daly for the Fall series as she was loaned to West Ham United for the remainder of 2020. Midfielder CeCe Kizer would also miss the fall series as she was loaned to Kolbotn IL in Norway.

Pos	Team	Pld	W	D	L	GF	GA	GD	Pts	Qualification
1	Portland Thorns FC (C)	4	3	1	0	10	3	+7	10	Community Shield
2	Houston Dash	4	3	0	1	12	7	+5	9	Runners-up
3	Washington Spirit	4	2	1	1	5	4	+1	7	Third place
4	Sky Blue FC	4	2	0	2	6	7	−1	6	
5	North Carolina Courage	4	1	2	1	8	10	−2	5	
6	Chicago Red Stars	4	1	1	2	7	7	0	4	
7	OL Reign	4	1	1	2	6	8	−2	4	
8	Orlando Pride	4	0	2	2	5	8	−3	2	
9	Utah Royals FC	4	0	2	2	3	8	−5	2	

Source: NWSL
Rules for classification: Tiebreakers
(C) Champions

==== Fall Series Match Results ====
September 12, 2020 1	North Carolina Courage	4–3	Houston Dash	Cary, North Carolina
	Dahlkemper 18' (pen.); Debinha 52', 86'; L. Williams 83'		Latsko 25'; Mewis 37'; Schmidt 70'	Stadium: WakeMed Soccer Park

September 26, 2020 2	Houston Dash	3–1	Orlando Pride	Houston, Texas
	Prince 27'; Schmidt 55' (pen.); Groom 72'		Viggiano 45+3'	Stadium: BBVA Compass Stadium

October 4, 2020 3	Houston Dash	4–1	North Carolina Courage	Houston, Texas
	Schmidt 30'; Latsko 37'; Mewis 60'; Groom 83'		Williams 74'	Stadium: BBVA Compass Stadium

October 9, 2020 4	Orlando Pride	1–2	Houston Dash	Orlando, Florida
	Leroux 47'		Groom 13'; Latsko 29'	Stadium: Osceola County Stadium

== Club ==
=== Roster ===
As of September 16, 2020.

Note: Flags indicate national team as defined under FIFA eligibility rules; some limited exceptions apply. Players may hold more than one non-FIFA nationality.

No.	Pos.	Nation	Player
1	GK	USA	Jane Campbell
2	DF	CAN	Allysha Chapman
3	FW	ENG	Rachel Daly
4	FW	CAN	Maegan Kelly
5	MF	USA	CeCe Kizer
6	FW	USA	Shea Groom
7	FW	USA	Katie Stengel
8	FW	CAN	Nichelle Prince
9	MF	USA	Haley Hanson
10	MF	USA	Christine Nairn
11	DF	USA	Megan Oyster
12	MF	USA	Veronica Latsko
13	MF	CAN	Sophie Schmidt
14	MF	USA	Brianna Visalli
15	DF	JAM	Lauren Silver
16	FW	JAM	Kayla McCoy
17	DF	USA	Erin Simon
19	MF	USA	Kristie Mewis
20	GK	USA	Lindsey Harris

No.	Pos.	Nation	Player
23	DF	USA	Ally Prisock
24	FW	USA	Jamia Fields
25	DF	USA	Katie Naughton
26	FW	USA	Bridgette Andrzejewski
28	MF	USA	Cami Privett
99	GK	USA	Amanda Dennis
-	MF	USA	Jaci Jones
-	FW	USA	Shaina Ashouri

== Player Transactions ==
As of February 8, 2020

=== Transfers In ===
Date	Player	Positions played	Previous club	Fee/notes	Ref.
01/06/20	(United States) Katie Naughton	DF	(United States) Chicago Red Stars	Acquired in a trade with Chicago in exchange for Kealia Ohai and a second-round draft pick in the 2020 NWSL College Draft	
01/08/20	(United States) Katie Stengel	FW	(United States) Utah Royals	Acquired in a trade with Utah along with a third-round pick in the 2020 College Draft in exchange for a second-round draft pick in the 2020 and 2021 NWSL College Drafts	
01/09/20	(United States) Lindsey Harris	GK	(Norway) Klepp IL	Signed	
01/24/20	(United States) Erin Simon	DF	(England) West Ham	Acquired through a transfer	
01/25/20	(United States) Megan Crosson	DF	(United States) Washington Spirit	Signed	
01/27/20	(United States) Amanda Dennis	GK	(United States) Penn State	Signed	
02/03/20	(United States) Shea Groom	FW	(United States) OL Reign	Acquired alongside Megan Oyster and a 2022 Draft pick in a trade with OL Reign for Amber Brooks and Sofia Huerta.	
02/03/20	(United States) Megan Oyster	DF	(United States) OL Reign	Acquired alongside Shea Groom and a 2022 Draft pick in a trade with OL Reign for Amber Brooks and Sofia Huerta.	

=== Transfers Out ===
Date	Player	Positions played	Destination club	Fee/notes	Ref.
11/04/19	(Australia) Kyah Simon	FW	(Australia) Melbourne City	Placed on Re-Entry Wire	
11/04/19	(Australia) Clare Polkinghorne	DF	(Australia) Brisbane Roar	Placed on Re-Entry Wire	
11/04/19	(United States) Grace Cutler	MF	unattached	Placed on Re-Entry Wire	
12/19/19	(Mexico) Ariana Calderón	FW	(Mexico) C.F. Monterrey	Waived	
01/06/20	(United States) Kealia Ohai	FW	(United States) Chicago Red Stars	Traded to Chicago for Katie Naughton and a second-round draft pick in the 2020 NWSL College Draft	
01/07/20	(Canada) Devon Kerr	GK	(France) FC Metz	Waived	
01/22/20	(Canada) Lindsay Agnew	DF	(Australia) Sydney FC	Waived	
01/22/20	(United States) Jazmin Jackmon	DF	unattached	Waived	
01/26/20	(Mexico) Bianca Henninger	GK		Retired	
02/03/20	(United States) Sofia Huerta	FW	(United States) OL Reign	Traded to OL Reign alongside Amber Brooks in exchange for a 2022 Draft pick, Shea Groom and Megan Oyster.	
02/03/20	(United States) Amber Brooks	DF	(United States) OL Reign	Traded to OL Reign alongside Sofia Huerta in exchange for a 2022 Draft pick, Shea Groom and Megan Oyster.	

== See also ==
- 2020 National Women's Soccer League season
- 2020 in American soccer
