= Caroline Kastor =

American retired soccer player (born 1991)

Personal information
- Full name: Caroline Allison Kastor
- Date of birth: October 12, 1991 (age 35)
- Place of birth: Wichita, Kansas, United States
- Height: 1.60 m (5 ft 3 in)
- Position: Forward

College career
| Years | Team | Apps | (Gls) |
| 2010–2013 | Kansas Jayhawks | 80 | (26) |

Senior career*
| Years | Team | Apps | (Gls) |
| 2015–2016 | FC Kansas City | 23 | (0) |
| 2017 | FC Wichita | 1 | (0) |
- * Club domestic league appearances and goals as of May 15, 2017

Caroline Allison Kastor (born October 12, 1991) is an American retired soccer player, who played for FC Kansas City in the National Women's Soccer League (NWSL).

== Early life ==
Caroline is the youngest of five children to parents Tina Bennett-Kastor and Frank Kastor. She attended Kapaun Mt. Carmel Catholic High School in Wichita, Kansas, where she played on the varsity soccer team for four years and scored 108 goals with 37 assists. Kastor was named to the first team all-state, all-region, all-metro and all-city during her junior and senior years. She was named the team's Offensive Player of the Year the same years.

Kastor played club soccer for the Wichita Tigers, River City Lady Tigers and River City Fire. She played for the state Olympic Development Program (ODP) regional ODP teams. In March 2009, she competed with the regional team at the Region II International Tour in Brazil.

== Playing career ==
=== Kansas Jayhawks, 2010–2013 ===
Kastor attended University of Kansas where she played soccer for the Jayhawks from 2010–2013. She scored her first goal for the Jayhawks her freshman season during the season-opening game against Eastern Kentucky. In her 11 appearances, she scored three goals and tallied two assists which tied for second on the team. In 2011, she made 11 starts in her 21 appearances and ranked third on the team with 19 points. Her seven assists ranked second on the team and tied for 10th in the Big 12 Conference. She was named to the Academic All-Big 12 First Team. As a junior in 2012, Kastor led the Jayhawks in goals (11), game-winning goals (5), shots on goal (32) and points (24). She was named Big 12 Offensive Player of the Week during the week of September 7. Kastor was the second Kansas player ever to be named to an Academic All-America team after being named to the NSCAA Academic All-America Third Team. She earned NSCAA All-Central Region Second Team, All-Big 12 Second Team, TopDrawerSoccer.com Midseason Top 100 and Academic All-Big 12 First Team honors. As of October 2015, Kastor's 26 career goals rank second all-time at Kansas.

=== FC Kansas City, 2015–2016 ===
After playing initially as an amateur call-up for FC Kansas City while the national team players were away in preparation for the 2015 FIFA Women's World Cup in Canada, Kastor signed with the team in July 2015. While attending Graduate School, she made eight appearances for Kansas City during the 2015 season recording a total of 161 minutes. After finishing the regular season in third place with a 9–6–5 record, Kansas City won the championship after defeating first place team Seattle Reign FC in the final.

Kastor's contract was extended for the 2016 season. She made 15 appearances, including 3 starts for a total of 296 minutes on the pitch. Kansas City finished in sixth place with a 7–8–5 record.

In March 2017, Kastor announced her retirement. She completed a Master of Arts Degree at Kansas University in 2017 and then attended KU School of Law, graduating in 2020.

=== FC Wichita ===
After her retirement, she joined FC Wichita and played in the Women's Premier Soccer League in the season opener against FC Dallas.

== Honors ==
with FC Kansas City

- NWSL championship: 2015
