= Amanda Dennis =

Amanda Dennis may refer to:

- Amanda Dennis (goalball), American goalball player
- Amanda Dennis (soccer), American former soccer player
