= Shea Groom =

American soccer player (born 1993)

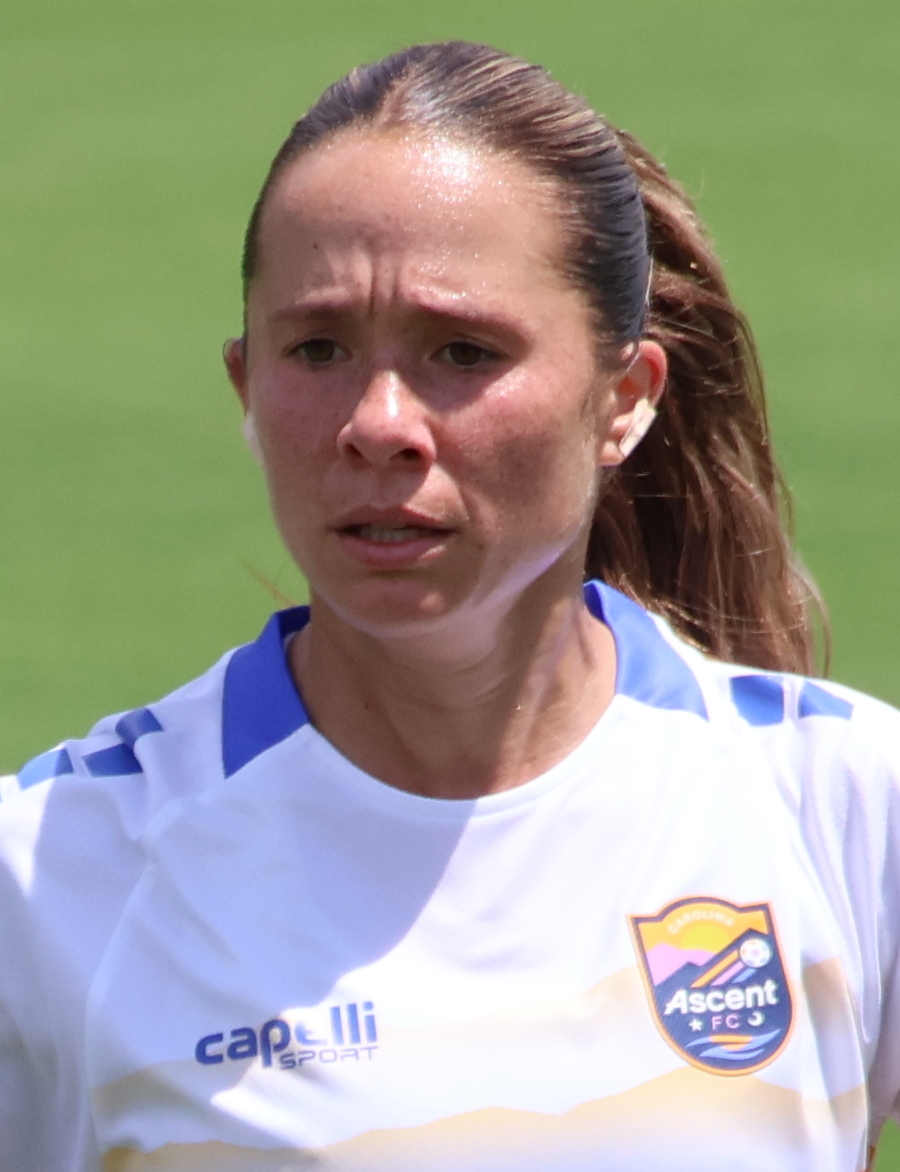
- Groom with the Carolina Ascent in 2026

Personal information
- Full name: Shea Ellese Groom
- Date of birth: March 4, 1993 (age 33)
- Place of birth: Liberty, Missouri, United States
- Height: 1.68 m (5 ft 6 in)
- Positions: Midfielder; forward

Team information
- Current team: Carolina Ascent
- Number: 20

College career
Years	Team	Apps	(Gls)
2011–2014	Texas A&M Aggies	84	(41)

Senior career*
Years	Team	Apps	(Gls)
2015–2017	FC Kansas City	54	(17)
2018	Sky Blue FC	21	(2)
2019	Reign FC	14	(2)
2020–2023	Houston Dash	46	(4)
2024–2025	Chicago Stars	31	(2)
2026–	Carolina Ascent	14	(1)

International career
2015–2016	United States U23		
- * Club domestic league appearances and goals as of 17:26, June 4, 2026 (UTC)

Shea Ellese Groom (born March 4, 1993) is an American professional soccer player who plays as a midfielder or forward for USL Super League club Carolina Ascent.

Groom played college soccer for the Texas A&M Aggies, earning first-team All-American honors in 2014, and was drafted by FC Kansas City in the second round of the 2015 NWSL College Draft. She won the NWSL Championship as a rookie and was named in the NWSL Second XI in 2016. After FCKC ceased operations in 2018, she spent one season each with Sky Blue FC and Reign FC before joining the Houston Dash, winning the 2020 NWSL Challenge Cup. She signed with the Chicago Red Stars as a free agent in 2024.

Groom played for the United States under-23 team and was called up to the full national team in 2016.

== Early life ==
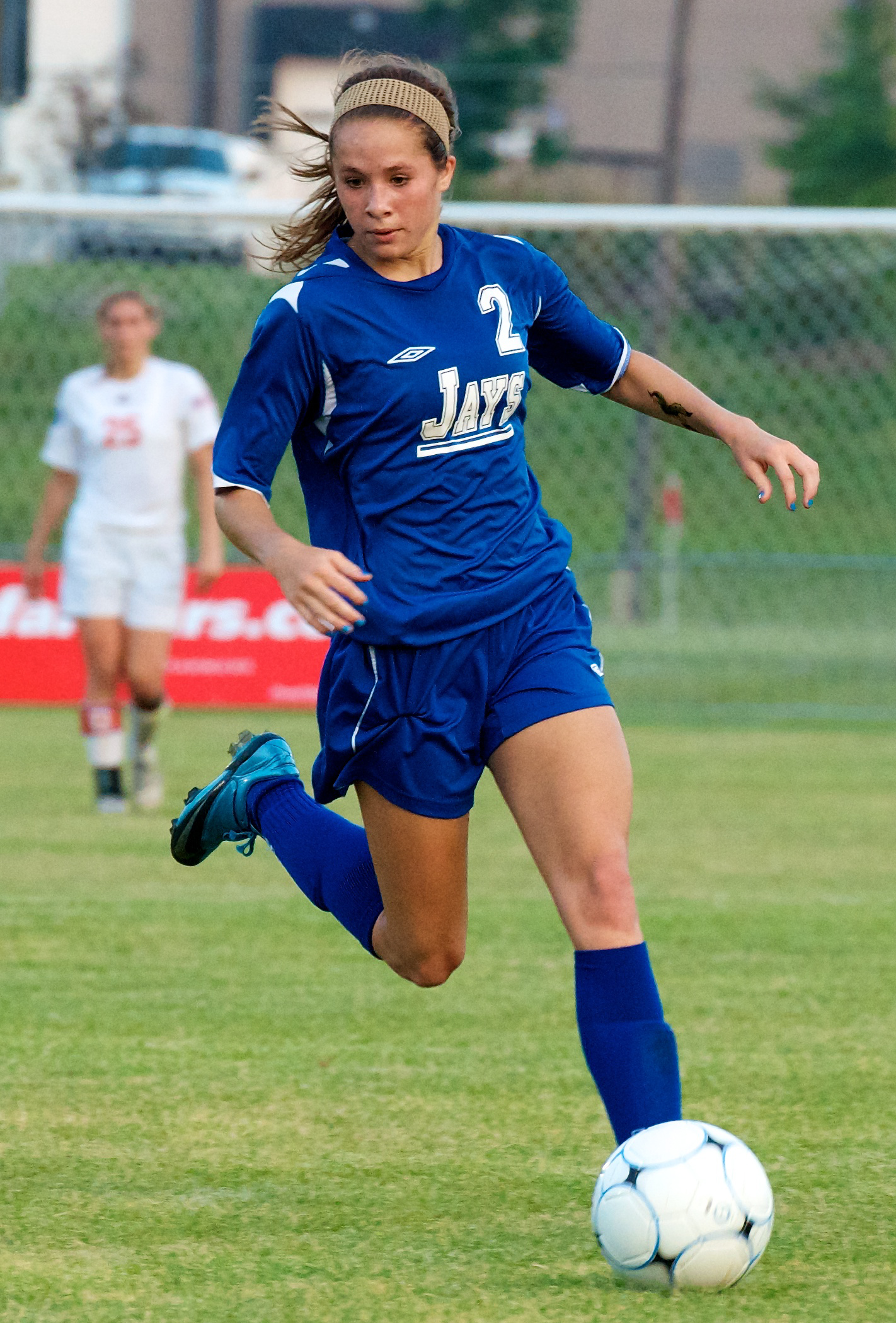
Groom playing for the Liberty Jays in 2011

Born in Liberty, Missouri, to Kelly and Lesa Groom, Groom attended Liberty High School where she led the girls' soccer team to a state championship and was named Missouri's Player of the Year in 2010. She was named Gatorade Missouri Player of the year twice in 2010 and 2011. Groom was a NSCAA High School Girls' All-America Soccer Team selection and named NSCAA State Player of the Year in 2010. In 2011, she was named All-American by ESPN Rise.

== College career ==
Groom played collegiate soccer with Texas A&M Aggies. She capped a decorated college career with 16 goals and seven assists in 26 matches in 2014. She ranked third in the Southeastern Conference and 19th in the nation for goals, which helped her win the SEC Offensive Player of the Year award. She recorded 41 goals and 25 assists in 84 career matches for the Aggies.

== Club career ==
Groom was selected by FC Kansas City as the 12th overall pick of the 2015 NWSL College Draft. She made her debut for Kansas City against Sky Blue FC on April 12, 2015. She scored her first goal for Kansas City in a 0–2 win over Houston Dash on May 2, 2015. Groom was named Player of the Week for week 13 of the 2015 National Women's Soccer League season after recording one goal and two assists against the Boston Breakers. She was also named the team's rookie of the year for 2015. Groom appeared in the 2015 NWSL Championship game as a second-half substitute, FC Kansas City won the Championship with a 1–0 win over the Seattle Reign.

On December 29, 2017, it was announced that Utah Royals FC had traded Groom along with teammate Christina Gibbons to Sky Blue FC and the no. 4 overall selection in the 2018 NWSL College Draft. The New Jersey club has acquired the players in exchange for the defender Kelley O'Hara, midfielder Taylor Lytle and the no. 25 overall pick in the 2018 NWSL College Draft.

On January 15, 2019, Reign FC acquired Groom from Sky Blue FC.

On February 3, 2020, Houston Dash acquired Groom, Megan Oyster, and a conditional draft pick from Reign FC in exchange for Sofia Huerta and Amber Brooks.

Groom signed with the Chicago Red Stars (later named Chicago Stars FC) in January 2024. She recorded 31 appearances and 2 goals across two seasons before departing from Chicago at the end of 2025.

In January 2026, Groom signed with USL Super League club Carolina Ascent.

== International career ==
Groom has represented the United States at various youth levels. She played for the under-23 national team at the 2015 La Manga Tournament. She started in all three matches and scored the first goal of the 2–0 victory over Norway.

In October 2016, Groom received her first call-up to the United States women's national soccer team for a pair of friendlies against Switzerland. She did not play in either game.

== Personal life ==
Groom's older sister, Kami, is a competitive ultimate player and has represented the United States on various national teams.

== Club statistics ==
As of October 15, 2023

Club	Season	League		Cup		Playoffs		Total	
Club	Season	Apps	Goals	Apps	Goals	Apps	Goals	Apps	Goals
FC Kansas City	2015	13	4	–	–	2	0	15	4
FC Kansas City	2016	19	8	–	–	–	–	19	8
FC Kansas City	2017	22	5	–	–	–	–	22	5
FC Kansas City	Total	54	17	0	0	2	0	56	17
Sky Blue FC	2018	21	2	–	–	–	–	21	2
Reign FC	2019	15	2	–	–	1	0	16	2
Reign FC	Total	26	4	0	0	1	0	27	4
Houston Dash	2020	4	3	7	3	–	–	11	6
Houston Dash	2021	24	3	4	1	–	–	28	4
Houston Dash	2022	20	1	5	1	1	0	26	2
Houston Dash	2023	1	0	0	0	–	–	1	0
Houston Dash	Total	49	7	16	5	1	0	67	12
Career total		129	28	16	5	4	0	149	33

== Honors and awards ==
Texas A&M Aggies

- SEC women's soccer tournament: 2013, 2014

FC Kansas City

- NWSL Championship: 2015

Houston Dash

- NWSL Challenge Cup: 2020

Individual

- NWSL Second XI: 2016
- First-team All-American: 2014
- Third-team All-American: 2013
- First-team All-SEC: 2013, 2014
- Second-team All-SEC: 2012
- SEC tournament all-tournament team: 2013, 2014
