= Alexa Newfield =

American retired soccer player (born 1991)

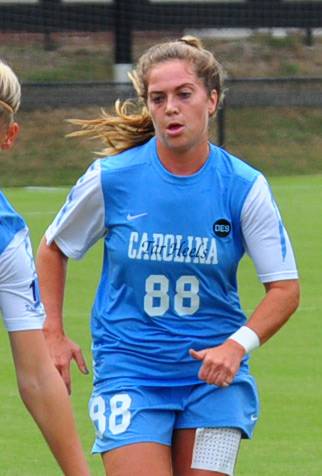
- Newfield, 2015

Personal information
- Full name: Alexa Kennedy Newfield
- Date of birth: December 3, 1991 (age 34)
- Place of birth: Atlanta, Georgia
- Height: 5 ft 3 in (1.60 m)
- Position: Forward

Youth career
- 2005–2010: GSA 92' Phoenix Re

College career
Years	Team	Apps	(Gls)
2010–2012	Georgia Bulldogs	46	(27)
2013–2015	North Carolina Tar Heels	35	(11)

Senior career*
Years	Team	Apps	(Gls)
2016–2017	FC Kansas City	25	(2)
2018	Utah Royals FC	0	(0)
2018	Washington Spirit	1	(0)
2019	Utah Royals FC	2	(0)
- * Club domestic league appearances and goals as of June 15, 2019

Alexa Kennedy Newfield (born December 3, 1991) is an American retired soccer player who last played as a forward for Washington Spirit of the National Women's Soccer League (NWSL). She also played for NWSL teams Utah Royals FC and FC Kansas City.

== Early life ==
Born and raised in Atlanta, Georgia, Newfield attended St. Pius X Catholic High School where she led the soccer team the 2009 and 2010 Georgia AAA state and NSCAA high school national championships as well as runners up at the 2008 Georgia 4A state championship. She was named to the Atlanta Journal-Constitution All-City Team in 2008 and 2009. In 2008, she was named to the 2008 ESPN Rise Top 50 Players to Watch List. The following year, she was named to the 2009 ESPN Rise Fab 50. Newfield set new school records for most career goals and most goals in a season.

Newfield played for the Georgia State Olympic Development Program (ODP) team from 2007–2008. Along with captaining the Region III ODP team and receiving u20 National Team camp invitations.

=== Georgia Bulldogs, 2010–2012 ===
Newfield attended the University of Georgia where she played for the Georgia Bulldogs from 2010–2012 and set numerous school records in goals scored and assists. All Academic SEC and First Team All-SEC every season played.

=== North Carolina Tar Heels, 2013–2015 ===
She was an ACC regular season champion in 2014, and was voted captain and was the team's leading goal scorer in her senior year. She started every game she played for the Tar Heels. She was included on the ACC Academic Honor Roll all three seasons as a Tar Heel, and was chosen first team All-Region and first team All-ACC. Previously, she was named to the SEC Preseason Watch List, College Sports Madness Preseason All-SEC Team, and the Hermann Trophy Watch List. She returned to win an ACC title and multiple ACC awards. She was called into an under-23 U.S. national team camp her junior year before suffering a season-ending knee injury.

== Club career ==
=== FC Kansas City, 2016–2017 ===
Newfield was drafted by FC Kansas City with the 28th pick in the 2016 NWSL College Draft. She signed with the club in April 2016. Newfield made eight appearances for Kansas City including two starts during the 2016 season. The team finished in sixth place during the regular season with a 7–8–5 record.

After returning to the team for the 2017 season, Newfield started 12 games and Newfield scored her first goal for FC Kansas City during a match against the Washington Spirit in May 2017 leading the team to a 1–0 win. She scored the game-opening goal against Seattle Reign FC and assisted the second on June 17 with the game ending in a 2–2 draw.

=== Utah Royals, 2018 ===
After FC Kansas City ceased operations following the 2017 season, Newfield was officially added to the roster of the Utah Royals FC on February 8, 2018.

=== Washington Spirit, 2018 ===
On August 30, 2018 Newfield was signed by the Washington Spirit for their final game of the 2018 NWSL Season.
