= Erika Tymrak =

American soccer player (born 1991)

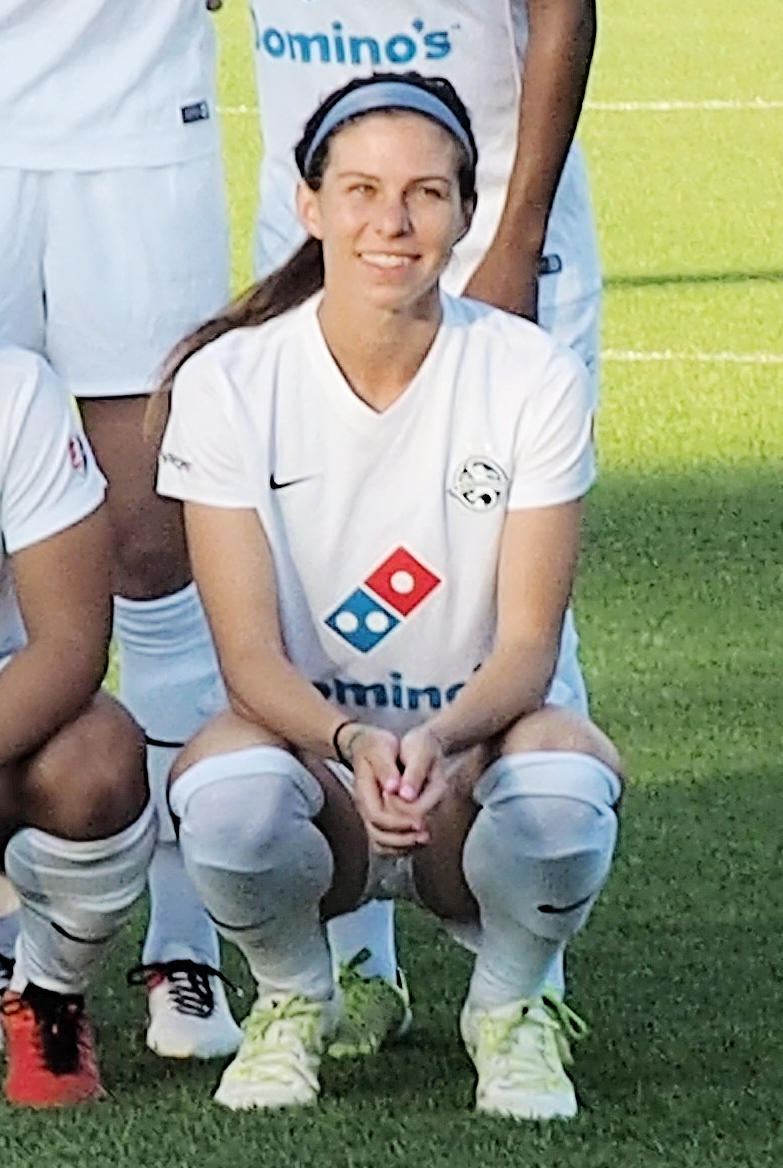
- Tymrak with FC Kansas City in 2016

Personal information
- Full name: Erika Leigh Tymrak
- Date of birth: August 7, 1991 (age 35)
- Place of birth: Detroit, Michigan, United States
- Height: 5 ft 5 in (1.65 m)
- Position: Midfielder

College career
Years	Team	Apps	(Gls)
2009–2012	Florida Gators	95	(32)

Senior career*
Years	Team	Apps	(Gls)
2013–2017	FC Kansas City	90	(16)
2013	→ Bayern Munich (loan)	6	(0)
2016–2017	→ Melbourne City (loan)	12	(2)
2018–2019	Utah Royals	30	(1)
2021–2023	Orlando Pride	48	(2)
2024–2025	Tampa Bay Sun	12	(0)
Total		198	(21)

International career^{‡}
2008	United States U-17		
- United States U-20
2011–2014	United States U-23		
2013–2014	United States	3	(1)
- * Club domestic league appearances and goals as of June 28, 2025 ‡ National team caps and goals as of January 6, 2020

Erika Leigh Tymrak (born August 7, 1991) is an American former professional soccer player who played as a midfielder. Tymrak was drafted by FC Kansas City in the 2013 NWSL College Draft and later named the NWSL Rookie of the Year in her first professional season. She spent 11 total years in the NWSL, also playing with the Utah Royals and Orlando Pride. While with FC Kansas City, she spent loan spells with international clubs Bayern Munich and Melbourne City. Tymrak closed out her career with USL Super League club Tampa Bay Sun FC, where she helped Tampa Bay win the league's inaugural championship.

Tymrak represented the United States at various youth levels. She was a member of the United States under-17 team that was runner-up at the 2008 FIFA U-17 Women's World Cup. Tymrak also made three appearances for the United States senior team.

== Early life ==
Born in Detroit, Michigan, Tymrak grew up in Lakewood Ranch, Florida, where she attended the Edison Academic Center. She was a five-year member of the club soccer team at the IMG Soccer Academy led the team to the 2009 Florida State Cup U-19 final and 2008 U-18 semifinal. She was named 2009 and 2008 IMG Soccer Player of the Year and IMG's Most Valuable Player in 2007, 2006 and 2005.

Ranked as the number eight recruit on the ESPN RISE Fab 50 list, was a 2009 Parade All-American. In 2008, she was a member of the Region III Olympic Development Program (ODP) and the Florida ODP team and was a NSCAA/adidas Youth Girls All-Region III selection as well as an NSCAA/adidas Girls Youth All-America selection.

=== University of Florida ===
As a freshman for the University of Florida Gators soccer team during the 2009 season, Tymrak played in all 20 regular season games and started in 18 of them. In the Gators' second game and the first home game of the season on August 28, 2009, she took a 20-yard shot in the 79th minute to score her first collegiate goal, helping her team to a 3–0 win over Florida International. She also had her first collegiate assist and drew her first penalty kick for the Florida Gators, resulting her team's both goals in the 2–1 overtime win over Kentucky on September 25, 2009. On October 30, 2009, Tymrak's 2 assists in the final regular season match against South Carolina brought the Florida Gators to a decisive 3–0 win and thus the 2009 SEC regular season title. She scored 5 goals (tied 4th in team) and had 7 assists with 17 points (team's 2nd most) in the regular season. With her 7 assists, Tymrak became the Gators' top leader and second in the SEC in assists.

She was one of the only two unanimous selections in the 2009 SEC All-Freshman team. She was also named to the National Soccer Coaches Association of America (NSCAA) All-South Region third team and the Soccer America All-Freshman second team. As a sophomore in 2010, Tymrak was named to the 2010 Coaches Preseason All-Southeastern Conference Team.

In 2011, Tymrak led Florida with collegiate-highs for points (32) and goals (12) and was second in assists with eight. She ranked third in final SEC standings for points, shared third in goals and shared sixth in assists. She was named to the NSCAA All-America second team selection and NSCAA All-South Region first team. She was also an All-SEC first-team selection. TopDrawerSoccer.com ranked her number 15 its final top 100 upperclassmen list of 2011.

During her senior year in 2012, Tymrak appeared in 22 matches with 21 starts and was Florida's leader in goals (9), assists (12) and points (30). She tied for third on Gators' career charts in assists (40), sixth in points (104), tied for seventh in game-winning goals (11) and eighth for goals (32) and was the SEC leader (in all matches) in assists, second on game-winning goals, third in points and tied for sixth in goals. Her twelve assists shared sixth in the NCAA Division I. She was a semi-finalist for Hermann Trophy and was nominated for the Senior CLASS Award. Tymrak was named to the National Soccer Coaches Association of America (NSCAA) All-America first team, NSCAA All-South Region first team, and All-SEC first team. She earned Southeastern Conference Offensive Player of the Year and SEC Tournament MVP honors and was a Soccer America MVP first team selection. She was ranked number 16 on TopDrawerSoccer.com's final top 100 upperclassmen list of 2012. Following a golden goal at against Duke University, Tymrak was named NSCAA Player of the Week, SEC Offensive Player of Week and named to two national teams of the week. She earned her second SEC Offensive Player of the Week honor after hitting game-winning goal at Louisiana State and assisting on a game-winning goal at then No. 5 Texas A&M University.

== Club career ==
=== FC Kansas City, 2013–2017 ===
Tymrak was selected during the second round (eleventh overall) by FC Kansas City during the 2013 NWSL College Draft. She was named the league's NWSL Player of the Month for the month of July after scoring three goals and serving one assist in six games during the month and helped FC Kansas City to a 3–0–3 record. She was named NWSL Rookie of the Year for the 2013 season.

==== Loan to Bayern Munich ====
In September 2013, Tymrak signed with German Bundesliga side Bayern Munich on loan until the end of the year.

==== Loan to Melbourne City ====
In October 2016, Tymrak joined Australian club Melbourne City on loan.

=== Utah Royals FC, 2018–2019 ===
After FC Kansas City ceased operations following the 2017 season, Tymrak was officially added to the roster of the Utah Royals FC on January 22, 2018.

Tymrak announced her retirement from soccer on January 6, 2020, at the age of 28.

=== Orlando Pride, 2021–2023 ===
On January 30, 2021, Tymrak came out of retirement after Orlando Pride acquired her playing rights as part of a trade for Gunnhildur Yrsa Jónsdóttir in exchange for Kristen Edmonds and the natural second-round pick in the 2022 NWSL Draft. In January 2024, it was announced Tymrak and Orlando had mutually agreed to the termination of her contract in order to explore opportunities outside the NWSL.

=== Tampa Bay Sun, 2024–2025 ===
On April 23, 2024, Tymrak was announced as one of the first-ever signings for Tampa Bay Sun, who will begin play in the USL Super League in August 2024. Tymrak was joined by Domi Richardson and Jordyn Listro. At the end of the season, during which Tampa Bay won the inaugural USL Super League championship, she retired from professional soccer.

== International career ==
Tymrak was a member of the United States national soccer team that finished runner-up at the 2008 FIFA U-17 Women's World Cup in New Zealand. She had an assist in the USA's come-from-behind 2–1 victory over Germany in the semifinal, helping her team to go into the final versus Korea DPR. In July 2008, she was named Player of the Match after recording four assists in the U.S. U-17 National Team's 9–1 win versus Trinidad & Tobago in the CONCACAF Championships.

On August 22, 2013, Erika Tymrak received her first United States senior team call up from US Head Coach Tom Sermanni. On September 3, 2013, Tymrak made her debut for the USA against Mexico in a friendly match at RFK Stadium in Washington, D.C.; she started in the match and played for 70 minutes. On November 10, 2013, in her second appearance, Tymrak scored her first international goal, against Brazil, on an assist from Lindsey Horan, from a spot at 18 yards surrounded by defenders.

== Career statistics ==
=== Club summary ===
As of June 28, 2025.

Club	Season	League			Cup (Note: Includes the DFB-Pokal and NWSL Challenge Cup)		Playoffs		Total	
Club	Season	Division	Apps	Goals	Apps	Goals	Apps	Goals	Apps	Goals
FC Kansas City	2013	NWSL	21	6	—		1	1	22	7
FC Kansas City	2014	NWSL	21	4	—		2	0	23	4
FC Kansas City	2015	NWSL	19	3	—		2	1	21	4
FC Kansas City	2016	NWSL	17	1	—		—		17	1
FC Kansas City	2017	NWSL	12	2	—		—		12	2
FC Kansas City	Total		90	16	0	0	5	2	95	18
Bayern Munich (loan)	2013–14	Bundesliga	6	0	2	2	—		8	2
Melbourne City (loan)	2016–17	W-League	12	2	—		2	0	14	2
Utah Royals	2018	NWSL	14	1	—		—		14	1
Utah Royals	2019	NWSL	16	0	—		—		16	0
Utah Royals	Total		30	1	0	0	0	0	30	1
Orlando Pride	2021	NWSL	20	2	2	0	—		22	2
Orlando Pride	2022	NWSL	15	0	5	0	—		20	0
Orlando Pride	2023	NWSL	13	0	6	0	—		19	0
Orlando Pride	Total		48	2	13	0	0	0	61	2
Tampa Bay Sun FC	2024–25	USL Super League	12	0	—		0	0	12	0
Career total			198	21	15	2	7	2	220	25

=== International goals ===
As of match played November 10, 2013. United States score listed first, score column indicates score after each Tymrak goal.

No.	Date	Cap	Venue	Opponent	Score	Result	Competition
1	November 10, 2013	2	Citrus Bowl, Orlando, United States	Brazil	4–1	4–1	Friendly

== Honors and awards ==
=== College ===
Florida Gators

- SEC regular season: 2009, 2010, 2012
- SEC Tournament: 2010, 2012

=== Club ===
FC Kansas City

- NWSL Championship: 2014, 2015

Melbourne City

- W-League Championship: 2017

Tampa Bay Sun

- USL Super League: 2024–25

=== Individual ===
- SEC Offensive Player of the Year: 2012
- NSCAA First Team All-America: 2012
- NWSL Rookie of the Year: 2013

== See also ==
- 2008 FIFA U-17 Women's World Cup squads
- 2008 FIFA U-17 Women's World Cup
