= Caroline Flynn =

American soccer midfielder

Personal information
- Full name: Caroline Elizabeth Flynn
- Date of birth: February 28, 1994 (age 32)
- Place of birth: Lincoln, Nebraska, United States
- Height: 5 ft 5 in (1.65 m)
- Position: Midfielder

Youth career
- 2009–2010: Lincoln Southwest High School
- 2011: Normal Community High School
- Toro Soccer Club

College career
Years	Team	Apps	(Gls)
2012–2016	Nebraska Cornhuskers	78	(11)

Senior career*
Years	Team	Apps	(Gls)
2017	FC Kansas City	10	(0)

International career
2016	United States U23		
- * Club domestic league appearances and goals

Caroline Elizabeth Flynn (born February 28, 1994) is an American soccer midfielder.

== College career ==
Flynn started to play for the Nebraska Cornhuskers in the spring semester of 2012, after she chose to forego her senior year at Lincoln Southwest High School. She played 78 matches (starting all of them) and scored 11 goals for the Huskers. Flynn earned several honors and in 2016 she helped the Huskers to reach their first NCAA Tournament since 2013.

== Club career ==
Flynn was selected by Portland Thorns FC with the 40th pick in the 2017 NWSL College Draft making her the fourth Huskers player to be picked in a NWSL Draft. The Thorns failed to sign her to a contract. On April 14, 2017, FC Kansas City announced that Flynn would be added to their roster ahead of the start of the 2017 National Women's Soccer League season.

FC Kansas City ceased operations following the 2017 season, Utah Royals FC inherited all player contracts from FCKC but Flynn did not join them.

== International career ==
On April 25, 2016, Flynn was called for the United States U23 team for a training camp in Charlottesville, Virginia that involved only college players. On May 25, 2016, she was included among the 20-players squad the travelled to England to play the 2016 Nordic Tournament, an important youth competition.
