= FC Kansas City =

Soccer team

- Full name: FC Kansas City
- Nicknames: FCKC, "The Blues"
- Founded: November 21, 2012; 13 years ago
- Dissolved: November 20, 2017; 8 years ago
- Stadium: Swope Soccer Village
- Capacity: 3,557
- League: National Women's Soccer League
- Website: http://www.fckansascity.com/
Home colors	Away colors

FC Kansas City was an American professional women's soccer club based in Kansas City, Missouri. The team was one of the eight founding clubs of the National Women's Soccer League in 2012, and began play in 2013. They were two-time NWSL champions, having won titles in 2014 and 2015. After the 2017 season, the NWSL re-acquired owner Elam Baer's membership interest and subsequently ceased the team's operations.

== History ==
=== Establishment and inaugural season ===
In November 2012, it was confirmed that a Kansas City-based women's professional soccer team had been accepted into a new women's professional soccer league, later named National Women's Soccer League. The KC ownership group was composed of Chris Likens, his two sons Brad and Greg Likens, and Brian Budzinski, the same owners of the Missouri Comets of the Major Indoor Soccer League.

On December 12, 2012, FC Kansas City announced that Vlatko Andonovski, a former professional player and head coach of the Kansas City Kings of the PASL and Missouri Olympic Development Program (ODP), would be head coach of the team. On January 11, 2013, a new logo was unveiled for the team that features the team's colors: blue, white and black. According to a team-issued press release, "the new logo also represents the ever-flowing qualities that make up the game of women's professional soccer."

On January 14, 2013, as part of the NWSL Player Allocation, Nicole Barnhart (USA), Lauren Cheney (USA), Renae Cuéllar (MEX), Marylin Diaz (MEX), Becky Sauerbrunn (USA), Desiree Scott (CAN), and Lauren Sesselmann (CAN) were named to the team. On January 18, the team selected Kristie Mewis, Erika Tymrak, Whitney Berry, and Nia Williams in the 2013 NWSL College Draft. The team signed Sinead Farrelly, Jen Buczkowski, and Leigh Ann Robinson as free agents. During the February 7, 2013 NWSL Supplemental Draft, the Blues selected Courtney Jones, Bianca Henninger, Merritt Mathias, Casey Nogueira, Tina DiMartino, and Casey Berrier. Frances Silva was drafted in the 2014 NWSL College Draft. She was the 19th overall pick.

The Blues finished second during the regular season with an 11–6–5 record earning a berth to the playoffs. Post-season, the team swept the majority of the league's annual awards with Lauren Holiday receiving Golden Boot and League MVP honors, Erika Tymrak the recipient of the Rookie of the Year, and Becky Sauerbrunn winning Defender of the Year. Head coach Vlatko Andonovski won Coach of the Year. Four players were also named to the league's Best XI: Nicole Barnhart, Leigh Ann Robinson, Becky Sauerbrunn, and Lauren Holiday.

=== New ownership ===
In January 2017, it was announced that FCKC had been purchased by Elam Baer, the CEO of Minneapolis-based North Central Equity, LLC. Jean-Yves Viardin was named the new general manager and Vlatko Andonovski remained as head coach. NWSL Commissioner Jeff Plush stated, "Elam is committed to strengthening FC Kansas City’s roots throughout the entire Kansas City metropolitan area and beyond. Elam and his partners will look to build off of what has been started by the Likens family, whose support of and many contributions to the establishment and growth of the league will never be forgotten." Less than a year later, however, mismanagement and absentee ownership forced the league to re-acquire Baer's NWSL membership interest in order to cease the team's operations in November 2017. All of the team's player contracts, draft picks, and other player-related rights would be transferred to the expansion team Utah Royals FC. The NWSL would return to Kansas City in 2021 with the Kansas City Current, which ironically was an expansion team that consisted of the assets of the Utah Royals.

== Players and coaches ==
=== Final squad ===
As of August 3, 2017.

No.	Position	Nation	Player
2	FW	USA	Shea Groom
3	DF	USA	Becca Moros
4	DF	USA	Becky Sauerbrunn (captain)
5	DF	USA	Alex Arlitt
6	DF	NZL	Katie Bowen
7	MF	USA	Mandy Laddish
8	FW	USA	Amy Rodriguez
9	MF	USA	Lo'eau LaBonta
10	MF	USA	Yael Averbuch
11	MF	CAN	Desiree Scott
13	DF	USA	Brittany Taylor
14	FW	USA	Sydney Leroux
15	MF	USA	Erika Tymrak
17	DF	USA	Sydney Miramontez
18	GK	USA	Nicole Barnhart (vice-captain)
19	GK	USA	Cat Parkhill
21	MF	USA	Caroline Flynn
25	FW	USA	Brittany Ratcliffe
31	DF	USA	Christina Gibbons
44	FW	CAN	Maegan Kelly
88	MF	USA	Alexa Newfield

=== Head coach ===
- (North Macedonia) Vlatko Andonovski (2013–2017)

=== Retired numbers ===
FC Kansas City retired numbers
No.	Nat.	Player	Position	Career	No. retirement
12	United States	Lauren Holiday	FW/MF	2013–2015	August 27, 2015

== Year-by-year ==
Year	League	Regular season	Playoffs	Avg. attendance
2013	NWSL	2nd Place	Semi-Finals	4,626
2014	NWSL	2nd Place	Champions	2,018
2015	NWSL	3rd Place	Champions	3,091
2016	NWSL	6th Place	did not qualify	3,162
2017	NWSL	7th place	did not qualify	1,788

== Stadium ==
During the inaugural season, the Blues played at Shawnee Mission District Stadium in Overland Park, Kansas. The stadium has a 6,150 seating capacity. At that time, it was the third largest stadium in the league after Jeld-Wen Field of the Portland Thorns FC and Sahlen's Stadium of the Western New York Flash.

The team announced on January 8, 2014, that they would move to the Durwood Soccer Stadium on the UMKC campus through 2015.

However, for the 2015 season, FC Kansas City entered into a partnership with Sporting Kansas City to use their training grounds at Swope Soccer Village for training and the complex's championship field for matches. The stadium has seating for 1500, but was expanded to 3,557 using the bleachers FC Kansas City had purchased for use at Durwood Stadium for the previous season.

April 11, 2015 FC Kansas City hosted Sky Blue FC at Sporting Park for its inaugural home match of the season, drawing a crowd of 8,489.

== Broadcasting ==
As of April 2017, FC Kansas City games were streamed exclusively by Go90 for American audiences and via the NWSL website for international viewers. For the 2017 season, the Blues will be featured in three nationally-televised Lifetime NWSL Game of the Week broadcasts on June 3, August 16 and September 9.

Ahead of the 2013 season, it was announced that games would be broadcast on the team's website and YouTube. Eight games were broadcast locally on Time Warner Cable’s Metro Sports. During the 2014 season, nine games were broadcast on the same channel.

== Supporters ==
FC Kansas City's official supporters group was called the KC Blue Crew.

== Honors ==
- NWSL Championship
  - Winners: 2014, 2015
