= Christina Gibbons =

American soccer player (born 1994)

Personal information
- Full name: Christina Marie Gibbons
- Date of birth: December 30, 1994 (age 31)
- Place of birth: Cincinnati, Ohio, United States
- Height: 5 ft 3 in (1.60 m)
- Position: Defender

College career
Years	Team	Apps	(Gls)
2013–2016	Duke Blue Devils	88	(10)

Senior career*
Years	Team	Apps	(Gls)
2017	FC Kansas City	24	(1)
2017–2018	→ Melbourne Victory (loan)	10	(1)
2018	Sky Blue FC	18	(0)

International career
2014	United States U20		
2015–2017	United States U23		
- * Club domestic league appearances and goals

Christina Marie Gibbons (born December 30, 1994) is an American soccer player who plays as a defender. She is married to social worker Dempsey Schott Gibbons.

== Club career ==
=== FC Kansas City, 2017 ===
After spending four years playing at Duke University, Gibbons was drafted by FC Kansas City with the 5th overall pick in the 2017 NWSL College Draft. She appeared in all 24 games for FCKC, where she scored 1 goal.

==== Loan to Melbourne Victory, 2017–2018 ====
On October 4, 2017, Gibbons was loaned to Melbourne Victory. She scored her first goal against Melbourne City, a game winner in the 86th minute.

=== Sky Blue FC, 2018 ===
In December 2017, Gibbons was traded to Sky Blue FC alongside teammate Shea Groom.

== International career ==
Gibbons received a call-up to the United States women's national soccer team for their 2017 January Camp. She has not yet been capped by the team.
