= Maegan Rosa =

American-born Canadian professional soccer player

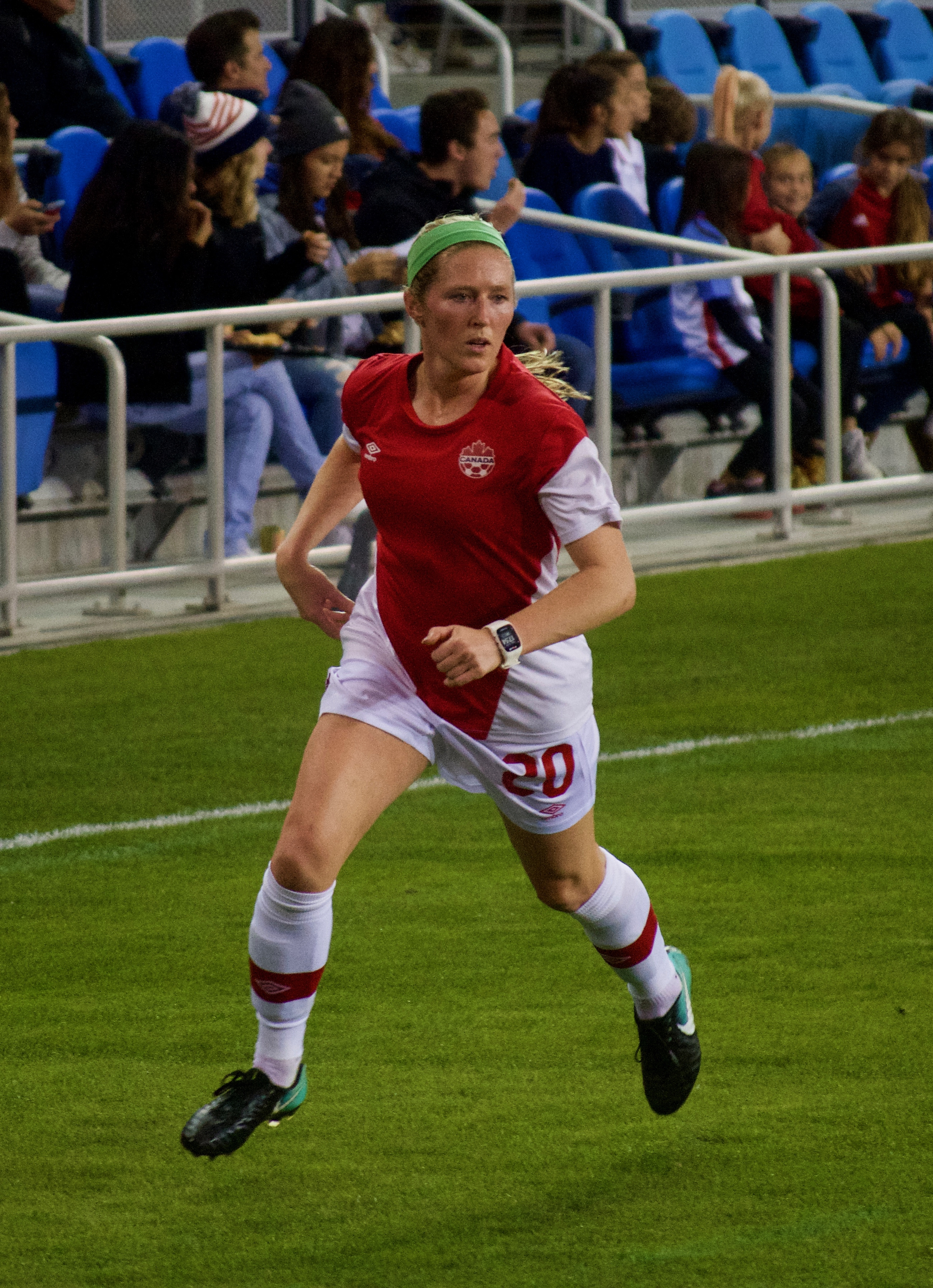

Personal information
- Full name: Maegan Lynn Rosa
- Birth name: Maegan Lynn Kelly
- Date of birth: February 19, 1992 (age 34)
- Place of birth: Kansas City, Missouri, United States
- Height: 5 ft 5 in (1.65 m)
- Position: Midfielder

College career
Years	Team	Apps	(Gls)
2010–2013	Marquette Golden Eagles		

Senior career*
Years	Team	Apps	(Gls)
2014	FC Kansas City	0	(0)
2014	Stjarnan	8	(4)
2015	Åland United	20	(4)
2016	Apollon Limassol		
2017	FC Kansas City	22	(5)
2018	Utah Royals	0	(0)
2018–2019	Atalanta Mozzanica	9	(8)
2019	Reign FC	6	(0)
2019	Florentia	10	(7)
2020–2022	Houston Dash	4	(0)

International career^{‡}
2013	United States U23		
2017–2019	Canada	5	(0)
- * Club domestic league appearances and goals as of August 7, 2021 ‡ National team caps and goals as of March 7, 2018

Maegan Lynn Rosa (née Kelly; born February 19, 1992) is an American-born Canadian professional soccer player.

== Club career ==
=== FC Kansas City, 2014 ===
Rosa was drafted by FC Kansas City in the fourth round of the 2014 NWSL College Draft.

=== UMF Stjarnan, 2014 ===
Rosa was transferred to Stjarnan later in 2014 where she played in eight games and scored four goals.

=== Åland United, 2015 ===
Rosa signed with Åland United in 2015 where she started in 19 of her 20 games with the team.

=== FC Kansas City, 2017 ===
Rosa signed with FC Kansas City in April 2017.

=== Utah Royals FC, 2018 ===
Rosa was added to the roster of the Utah Royals after FC Kansas City ceased operations. On June 20, 2018 Rosa was released from the Utah Royals after zero appearances on the field.

=== Atalanta Mozzanico, 2019 ===
On December 5, 2018 signed in the Serie A for Atalanta Mozzanica Calcio Femminile Dilettantistico. She played her debut on January 26, 2019 after a sub in for Sofia Colombia, in Minute 62 and scored, in her first game, 10 ten minutes after her substitution, in a 2:2 draw at U.P.C. Tavagnacco. She made a total of 9 appearances, scoring 8 goals for the club.

=== Reign FC, 2019 ===
On May 3, 2019 Rosa was signed by the Reign as a national team replacement player. She made her debut as a substitute against the Washington Spirit the following day. On July 15, 2019, Rosa was released by the club.

=== CF Florentia, 2019 ===
Rosa joined Italian club Florentia in 2019.

=== Houston Dash, 2020–2022 ===
On January 17, 2020 Rosa was signed by the Houston Dash.

== International career ==
In November 2017, Rosa received her first her first call up to the Canadian Women's National Team as her Dad hails from Toronto. She earned her first cap on November 9, 2017 in a friendly against the United States at BC Place in Vancouver, BC.

== Personal life ==
She married Luis Rosa in December 2020.

== Honors ==
Houston Dash

- NWSL Challenge Cup: 2020
