= Amanda Dennis (soccer) =

American soccer player (born 1998)

Personal information
- Full name: Amanda Marie Dennis
- Date of birth: May 25, 1998 (age 28)
- Place of birth: San Diego, United States
- Height: 6 ft 0 in (1.83 m)
- Position: Goalkeeper

College career
Years	Team	Apps	(Gls)
2016–2019	Penn State Nittany Lions	72	(0)

Senior career*
Years	Team	Apps	(Gls)
2020–2021	Houston Dash	1	(0)
- * Club domestic league appearances and goals

Amanda Marie Dennis (born May 25, 1998) is an American former professional soccer player who last played as a goalkeeper for Houston Dash of the National Women's Soccer League (NWSL).

== Early life ==
Dennis was born in San Diego.

== College career ==
Dennis played for Penn State Nittany Lions women's soccer team.

== Club career ==
Dennis signed for Houston Dash in January 2020. She retired from professional soccer in November 2021.

== International career ==
Dennis is a former United States youth international.

== Honors ==
Houston Dash

- NWSL Challenge Cup: 2020
