= Swope Soccer Village =

Soccer complex located in Swope Park in Kansas City, Missouri

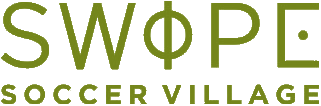

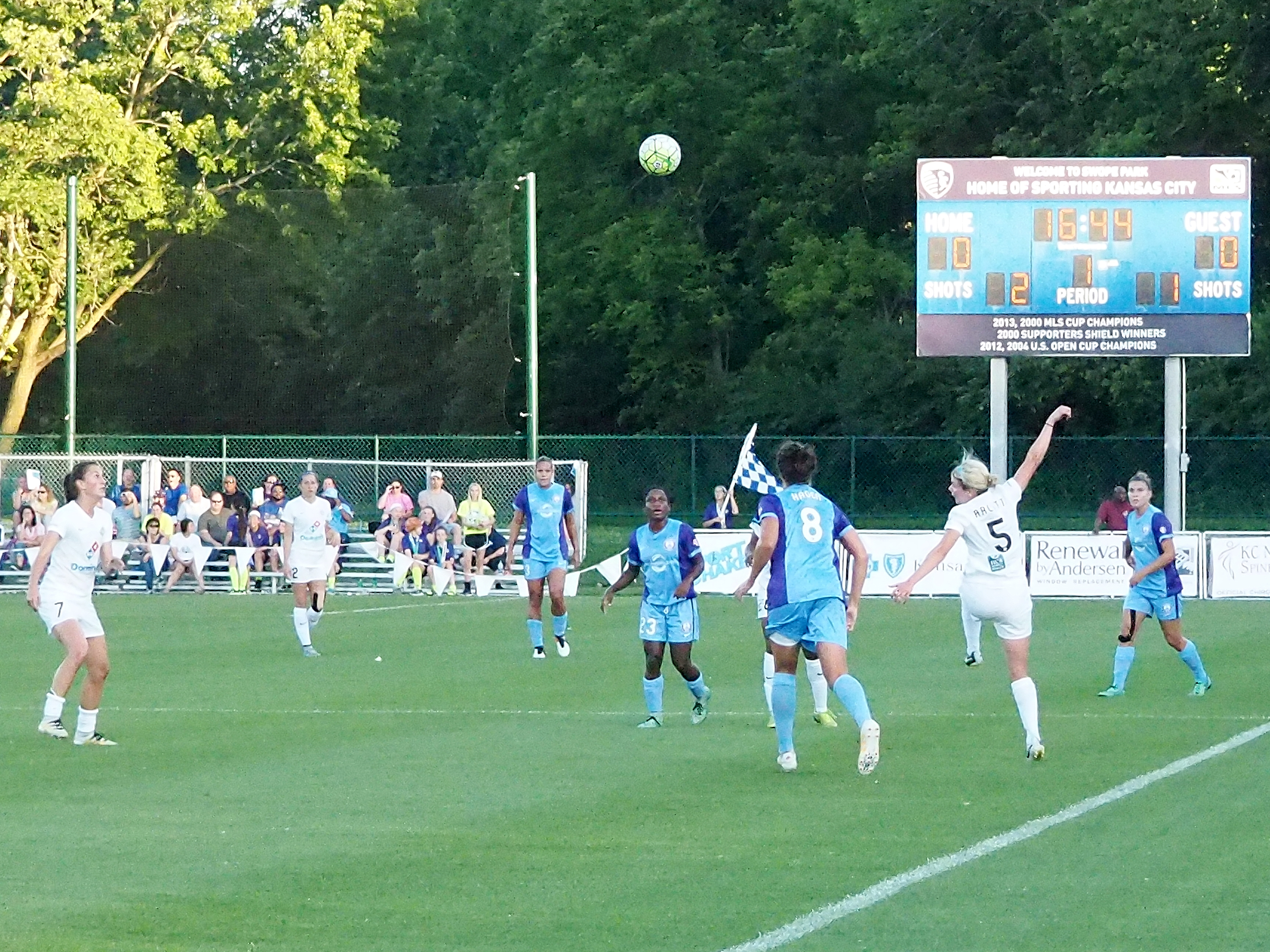
- FC Kansas City playing at Swope Park in 2016
- Interactive map of Swope Soccer Village
- Location: 6310 Lewis Road; Kansas City, Missouri 64132
- Coordinates: 39.012°N 94.520°W
- Owner: City of Kansas City
- Operator: Sporting Kansas City
- Capacity: 3,557
- Surface: Burmuda grass

Construction
- Groundbreaking: 2007
- Opened: 2007; 19 years ago

Tenants
- Sporting Kansas City II (MLSNP) (2016–2017, 2022–present); FC Kansas City (NWSL) (2015–2017); Kaw Valley FC (USL2) (2021)

Swope Soccer Village is a soccer complex located within Swope Park in Kansas City, Missouri, first dedicated in 2007 with further renovations completed in 2014. The facility is a public-private partnership between the City of Kansas City's parks department and Sporting Kansas City of Major League Soccer, with field reservations managed by Sporting Fields + Athletics. Children's Mercy Training Center is home to Sporting Kansas City II and Sporting Kansas City's six youth academy teams.

== Overview ==
The complex features nine fields in total: a natural-grass stadium field, two natural-grass practice fields for Sporting Kansas City and six artificial turf fields for local youth soccer clubs. The facility also served as the venue for the Big 12 Conference women's soccer tournament from 2013 to 2019, and has hosted the NCAA Division II Men's and Women's soccer championships, as well as the men's and women's Division III championships. In addition, the Missouri high school girls state finals were played at Swope Soccer Village from 2016–2020.

== Background and planning ==
The current Swope Soccer Village is the result of an expansion that completed in 2014 and cost $13.4 million in city funds.

The soccer complex is located on land that was the practice field for the Kansas City Chiefs before Arrowhead Stadium opened in 1972. Sporting Kansas City, then known as the Kansas City Wizards, broke ground and dedicated their training facility in Swope Park in 2007, with a second phase of construction completed in 2008.

The completed Swope Soccer Village opened in September 2015, with Sporting handing the responsibility of managing the facilities to Heartland Soccer Association prior to Sporting Fields + Athletics handling management duties. The main stadium had opened earlier, in November 2013, to host the Big 12 women's soccer tournament.

In 2022, Swope Soccer Village expanded to include an additional 1,000 parking spaces.

== Tenants ==
In January 2015, FC Kansas City of the National Women's Soccer League had reached an agreement with Sporting to play its home games at the main stadium in Swope and use the training fields. The stadium's capacity was increased to 3,557 using bleachers the team had purchased for use at Durwood Soccer Stadium, its previous home. FC Kansas City folded after the 2017 season.

For the 2026 FIFA World Cup, the England national football team used Swope as its training base for the duration of the tournament.
