= Mandy Laddish =

American soccer player (born 1992)

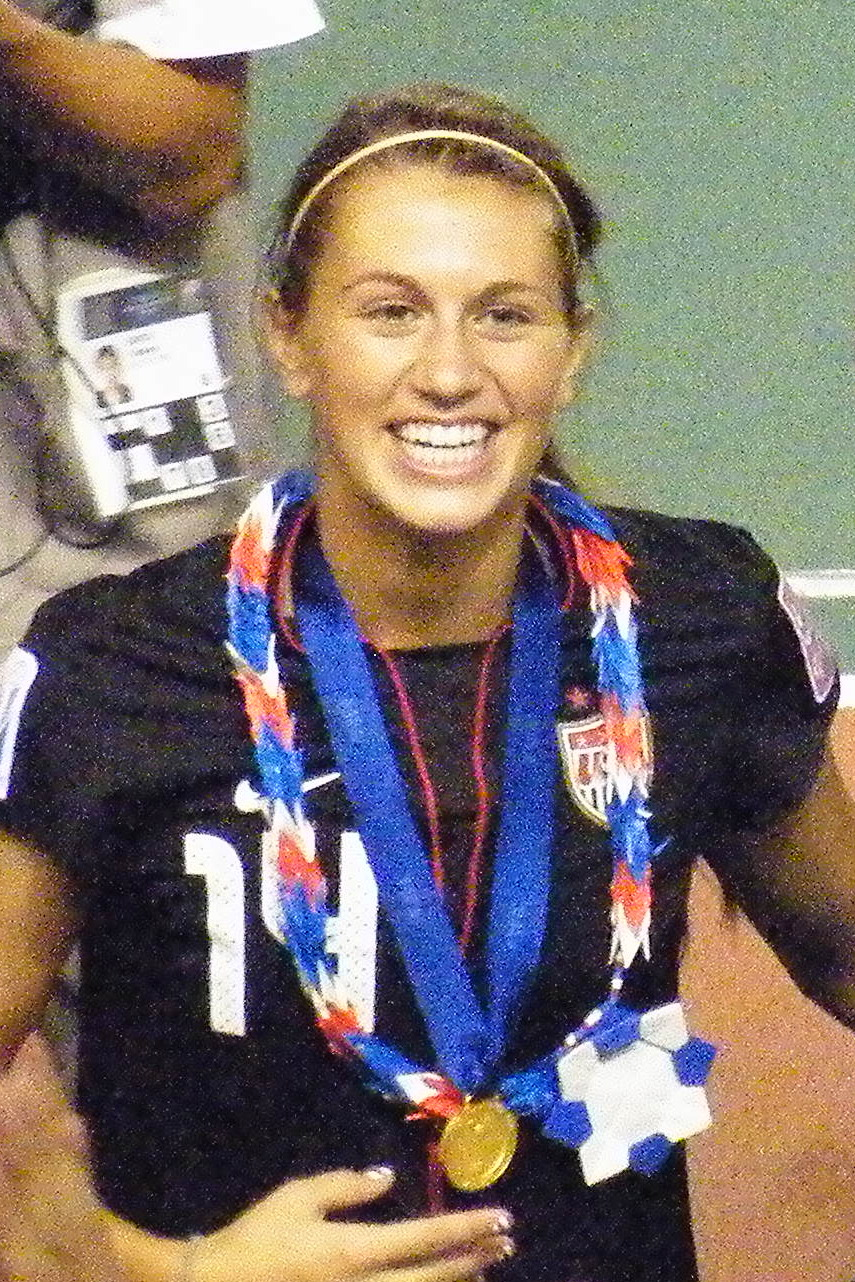
- Laddish with United States U-20 in 2012

Personal information
- Full name: Amanda Christine Laddish
- Date of birth: May 13, 1992 (age 34)
- Place of birth: Lee's Summit, Missouri, United States
- Height: 1.70 m (5 ft 7 in)
- Position: Midfielder

College career
Years	Team	Apps	(Gls)
2010–2013	Notre Dame Fighting Irish	85	(6)

Senior career*
Years	Team	Apps	(Gls)
2014–2017	FC Kansas City	39	(1)
2018–2019	Utah Royals FC	11	(0)

International career^{‡}
2008	United States U-17		
2009–2012	United States U-20	6	(0)
- * Club domestic league appearances and goals as of July 21, 2019 ‡ National team caps and goals as of December 7, 2014

Amanda Christine Laddish (born May 13, 1992) is an American retired soccer player.

== Early life ==
Laddish was raised in Lee's Summit, Missouri, where she attended Lee's Summit High School where she played for the varsity soccer team. In 2009, she was named a Parade All-American, ESPN/RISE second-team All-American, and all-state selection. She was an NSCAA youth/high school all-region selection in 2008 and 2009.

In February 2010, Laddish was ranked 26th for club soccer players across the United States by Top Drawer Soccer. In addition to playing and captaining club team Blue Valley Stars, she played for regional Olympic Development Program (ODP) teams.

=== Notre Dame Fighting Irish ===
Laddish attended the University of Notre Dame from 2010 to 2013 where she received a bachelor's degree in marketing. During her freshman season in 2010, Laddish started all 25 matches helping the team win its third national championship. She was one of 26 players in the school's history to start every game of their freshman season. Laddish is also well known for her pregame salsa dancing.

== Club career ==
=== FC Kansas City 2014–2017 ===
Laddish was selected by FC Kansas City during the 2014 NWSL College Draft in January 2014. She made her first appearance for the club during a match against the Boston Breakers in which Kansas City defeated Boston 2–0. Kansas City finished the regular season in second place and advanced to the playoffs where they eventually won the championship after defeating the Seattle Reign 2–1. Laddish signed a new contract with FC Kansas City after the 2016 season. She underwent hip surgery in 2016 and was expected to play in 2017, but she was placed on the season ending injury list (SEI) and never played in 2017.

=== Utah Royals FC 2018–2019 ===
After FC Kansas City ceased operations, Laddish was added to the roster of the Utah Royals FC. On April 8, Laddish announced that she would undergo a second hip surgery, and would miss the entire NWSL season for the second straight year. Laddish signed a new contract with the Royals prior to the 2019 NWSL season. On April 20, 2019, she appeared in her first game with the Royals, this was her first appearance on the field since September 12, 2016, with FC Kansas City.

Laddish retired from professional soccer in February 2020.

== International career ==
Laddish has appeared with the United States national U-20 soccer team, and was a member of the championship team at the 2012 FIFA U-20 Women's World Cup.

== Honors ==
Notre Dame Fighting Irish

- NCAA Division I women's soccer tournament: 2010

FC Kansas City

- NWSL Championship (2): 2014, 2015

United States U20

- FIFA U-20 Women's World Cup: 2012
- CONCACAF Women's U-20 Championship: 2012

== See also ==
- 2012 FIFA U-20 Women's World Cup squads
- 2012 CONCACAF Women's U-20 Championship squads
- 2008 FIFA U-17 Women's World Cup squads
