= Sydney Leroux =

American soccer player (born 1990)

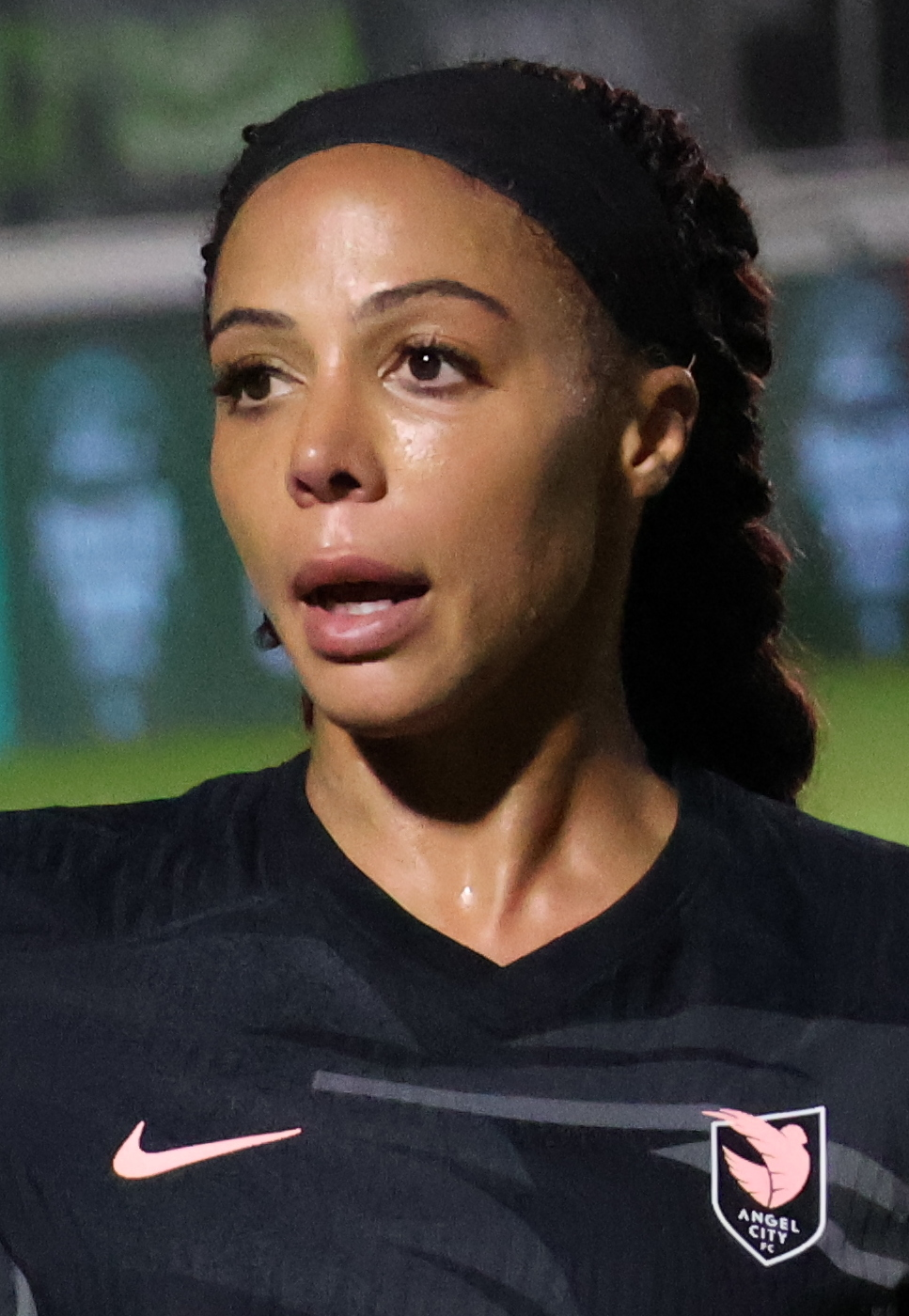
- Leroux with Angel City in 2024

Personal information
- Full name: Sydney Rae Leroux
- Date of birth: May 7, 1990 (age 36)
- Place of birth: Surrey, British Columbia, Canada
- Height: 5 ft 7 in (1.70 m)
- Position: Forward

Team information
- Current team: Angel City
- Number: 2

Youth career
- 2002–2004: Coquitlam City Wild
- 2004–2008: Sereno FC

College career
Years	Team	Apps	(Gls)
2008–2011	UCLA Bruins	?	(57)

Senior career*
Years	Team	Apps	(Gls)
2005	Vancouver Whitecaps	3	(0)
2011	Vancouver Whitecaps	11	(11)
2012	Seattle Sounders Women	2	(2)
2013	Boston Breakers	19	(11)
2014	Seattle Reign	22	(5)
2015	Western New York Flash	3	(1)
2016–2017	FC Kansas City	23	(6)
2018–2022	Orlando Pride	53	(16)
2022–	Angel City	42	(9)

International career^{‡}
2004	Canada U19	2	(0)
2008–2010	United States U20	39	(24)
2011–2017	United States	77	(35)
Medal record
Olympic Games
Gold medal – first place	2012 London
FIFA Women's World Cup
Winner	2015 Canada
- * Club domestic league appearances and goals as of 06:02, November 12, 2026 (UTC) ‡ National team caps and goals as of August 3, 2017

Sydney Rae Leroux (/ləˈruː/; born May 7, 1990) is a Canadian-born American professional soccer player who plays as a forward for Angel City FC of the National Women's Soccer League (NWSL). Leroux represented Canada at various youth levels before joining the United States women's national under-20 soccer team in 2008. She joined the U.S. senior national team in 2012. Leroux has earned over 75 caps with the national team and was part of the winning squads at the 2012 London Olympics and the 2015 FIFA Women's World Cup.

At age 15, Leroux became the youngest player to play for the semi-professional team Vancouver Whitecaps. She continued to play for the Whitecaps during college at UCLA, where she also played for the Bruins. Leroux was the number one pick by the Atlanta Beat during the Women's Professional Soccer Draft in January 2012. Following the suspension of the league the same year, she played for the Seattle Sounders Women during the summer of 2012.

In 2013, Leroux made her debut for the Boston Breakers in the NWSL during the league's inaugural season. She has also played for Seattle Reign FC, Western New York Flash and FC Kansas City.

== Early life ==
Leroux was born on May 7, 1990 in Surrey, British Columbia, to a white Canadian mother, Sandi Leroux, and a Black American father, Ray Chadwick. Her mother played third base for the Canadian national softball team. Her father was a professional baseball player who pitched briefly for the California Angels in 1986. Leroux's parents separated when her mother was three months pregnant with her, and Leroux was raised primarily by her mother. Leroux played baseball for Whalley Little League from 1994 to 2004. (Note: Attributed to multiple references:)

Leroux attended Johnston Heights Secondary School in Surrey for two years, where she was the leading scorer on the soccer team. As a track and field athlete, she won Provincials in the 4 × 100 meters relay with her team. Leroux played three seasons of club soccer with Coquitlam City Wild, helping the team to Provincial Cup Championships in 2003, 2004 and 2005. Leroux's prolific goalscoring helped the team win the under-14 national championship in 2003. She secured a bronze medal in helping the team finish third at the under-16 national tournament in 2005. The same year, Leroux played in three matches for the Vancouver Whitecaps of the W-League, recording two assists. At the age of 15, she was the youngest player to ever play for the club. She also won a championship as part of a British Columbia select team at the Canada Games in 2005.

At an early age, Leroux knew she wanted to play for the United States women's national soccer team. To pursue her goal, she moved to Scottsdale, Arizona at the age of 15 and attended Horizon High School during her junior and senior years while living with host families. (Note: Attributed to multiple references:) Despite having a challenging time adjusting to life without her family and friends, she helped lead Sereno Soccer Club to state titles in 2007 and 2008. (Note: Attributed to multiple references:)

== College career ==
Leroux played collegiate soccer for UCLA from 2008 to 2011, under head coaches Jill Ellis (2008–10) and B. J. Snow (2011). During her freshman season, she started in 18 of the 19 games in which she played. She was the sixth-highest scorer on the team, with five goals and six assists, for a total of 16 points during the season, and was named to the All-Freshman Team in the Pacific-10 Conference (Pac-10). During her second year, she led UCLA in scoring with 48 points (23 goals, two assists) and was a semi-finalist for the Hermann Trophy. Her 23 goals ranked second in the Pac-10 and she tied with her teammate Lauren Cheney for a new single-season record at UCLA. Leroux earned Soccer America MVP second team, Second-team All-Pac-10, and 2009 NCAA All-Tournament Team honors the same year. During the first round of the 2009 NCAA Division I Women's Soccer Tournament, she tied the school's record for most goals scored in a single match after scoring four during her team's 7–1 victory over Boise State.

"She's the most competitive person I've worked with, mentally and physically. She's been through a lot. When it's harder for her is when she's better."

— Jill Ellis

During the Bruins' first game of Leroux's junior season in 2010, she scored four goals against Cal Poly Pomona as her team won 7–0. She was subsequently named Pac-10 Player of the Week. Leroux scored the game-winning goal during the second round of the 2010 NCAA Tournament, helping the Bruins defeat the UCF Knights 2–1 and advance to the third round, where they lost to Stanford. As a junior, Leroux ranked fifth in UCLA history for career points (91) as well as fourth in goals (41) and game-winning goals (15). She ranked third in the Pac-10 for goals (13) and second in game-winning goals (6), which earned her First-team Soccer America MVP, Third-team NSCAA All-American, First-team NSCAA All-Pacific Region, and First-team All-Pac-10 honors.

During her final year with the Bruins in 2011, she led the team in scoring for the third straight season with 16 goals and three assists, for a total of 35 points. She was named First-team NSCAA All-American, was selected for Soccer America's MVP First Team, and was a semi-finalist for the Hermann Trophy. She scored eight game-winning goals, more than any other player in the newly renamed Pac-12 Conference. In October 2011, she scored a hat-trick within 21 minutes during a 6–1 win over Arizona State. (Note: Attributed to multiple references:) At the Bruins' next game against Colorado, Leroux scored another hat-trick as her team won 8–0. She finished her collegiate career ranked fourth in UCLA history for points (126), goals (57), and game-winning goals (23).

== Club career ==
=== 2011: Vancouver Whitecaps ===
Leroux had briefly played for the Vancouver Whitecaps in 2005 at the age of 15, and she returned to the club for the 2011 season. She finished the regular season as the second top goalscorer in the league, with 11 goals in 11 appearances. She scored once as the Whitecaps won 4–3 over Santa Clarita Blue Heat in the Western Conference Final, which saw them advance to the W-League Championship Final Four. Leroux was named to the All-Western Conference team and was named 2011 W-League Rookie of the Year.

=== 2012: WPS Draft and Seattle Sounders Women ===
Leroux was the number one pick by the Atlanta Beat in the 2012 Women's Professional Soccer Draft, but the league folded before she could play for the team. During the summer of 2012, Leroux signed with the Seattle Sounders Women of the W-League, joining her U.S. national teammates Hope Solo, Alex Morgan, Stephanie Cox, and Megan Rapinoe. Sounders head coach Michelle French described Leroux as a powerful attacker and "consummate goal scorer" who "prides herself on her defensive recovery and ability to win the ball back." Due to her national team commitments and preparation for the 2012 Summer Olympics, Leroux made only two regular season appearances for the club, scoring two goals and serving one assist. With the presence of the national team players, the Sounders sold out nine of their ten home matches at the 4,500 capacity Starfire Stadium. Average attendance during the 2012 season for the Sounders Women was four times higher than the next closest team.

=== 2013: Boston Breakers ===
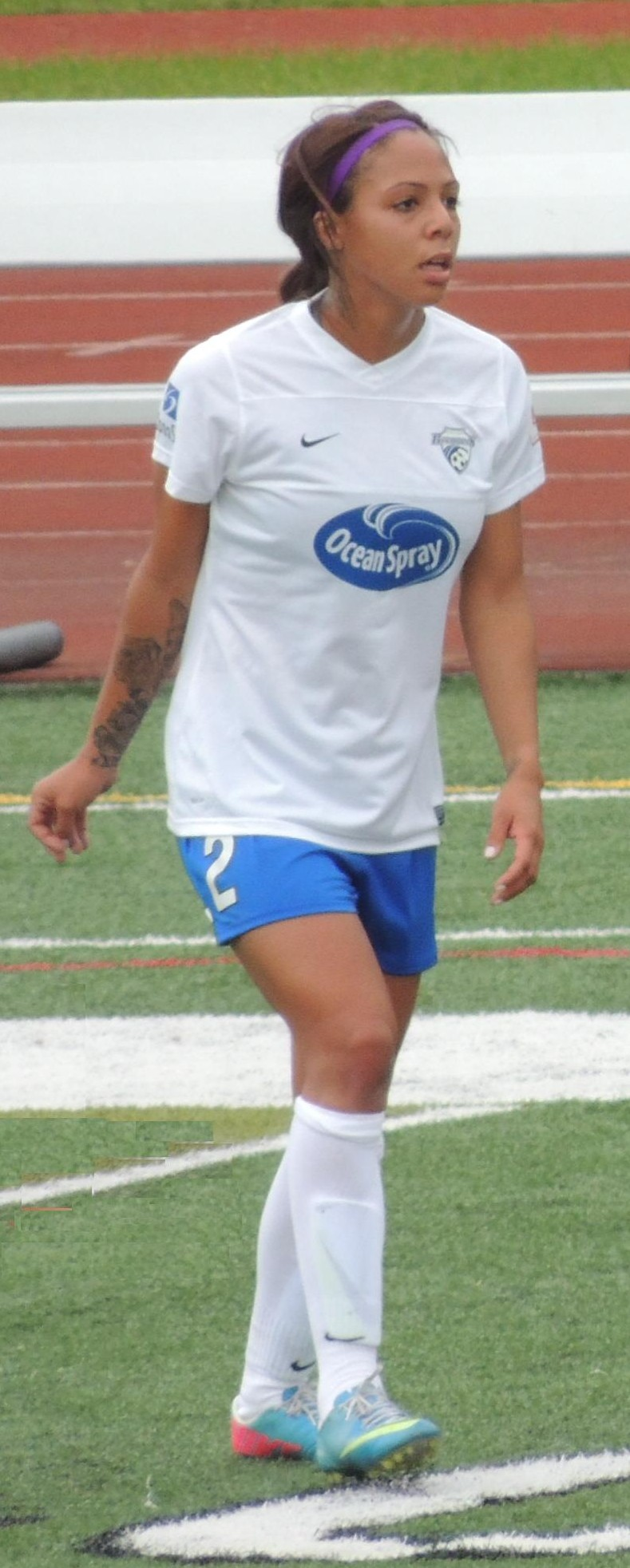
Leroux with the Boston Breakers in June 2013

In January 2013, Heather O'Reilly, Heather Mitts and Leroux were the three U.S. national team players allocated to the Boston Breakers for the inaugural season of the National Women's Soccer League (NWSL). Leroux scored her first goal with the Breakers during the team's season-opener, a 1–1 draw with the Washington Spirit. She scored the league's first hat-trick during the Breakers' 4–1 win against the Chicago Red Stars on May 4, and was subsequently named NWSL Player of the Week. On July 6, she scored two goals against the Portland Thorns, resulting in a 2–0 win for the Breakers.

Leroux's 11 goals during the season tied her for second top scorer with Abby Wambach of the Western New York Flash. The Breakers finished the 2013 season fifth in the league with an 8–6–8 record. Leroux came third in voting for NWSL Rookie of the Year.

=== 2014: Seattle Reign FC ===
In November 2013, Leroux was traded to the Seattle Reign FC for the 2014 NWSL season in exchange for Kristie Mewis, Michelle Betos and the Reign's first two picks in the 2015 draft. Reign head coach Laura Harvey described Leroux as one of the world's best forwards. She expected her to be the "consistent goal-scoring threat" that the team was lacking. Near the beginning of the 2014 season, the Reign achieved a 16-game undefeated streak, compiling a 13–0–3 record. The team finished at the top of the league in the regular season, winning the NWSL Shield. After defeating the Washington Spirit 2–1 in the playoff semi-finals, the Reign lost 2–1 to FC Kansas City during the championship final. Leroux finished the season with five goals in 22 appearances. In March 2015, it was announced that she was traded to Western New York Flash.

=== 2015: Western New York Flash ===
Due to her participation in the 2015 FIFA Women's World Cup and an ankle injury, Leroux played only three games for the Flash. She scored once in those three games.

=== FC Kansas City, 2016–2017 ===
On January 13, 2016, Leroux was traded to FC Kansas City. Leroux announced later that month that she was pregnant. Due to her pregnancy, she missed the 2016 NWSL season.

She returned to play for FC Kansas City in 2017. She scored a goal in the first game of the season, a 2–0 win over the Boston Breakers. She played in 23 games for FCKC in 2017, and scored 6 goals. Kansas City finished the season in sixth place and did not qualify for the playoffs. After FCKC ceased operations following the 2017 season, her rights were transferred to the Utah Royals.

=== Orlando Pride, 2018–2022 ===
On February 2, 2018, Leroux was traded to the Orlando Pride for Orlando's first round pick in the 2019 NWSL College Draft. Prior to the 2018 NWSL season, Leroux signed a contract with the Orlando Pride as she was no longer an allocated player by U.S. Soccer.

In March 2019, at six months pregnant with her daughter, Leroux returned to pre-season training. She returned to playing during the 2019 season, making an 86th-minute substitute appearance against Sky Blue FC on September 29, just three months after giving birth.

She signed a three-year contract extension with an additional one-year option ahead of the 2021 season.

=== Angel City FC, 2022–present ===
On June 29, 2022, Angel City FC acquired Leroux in exchange for $75,000 in allocation money and Angel City's natural first-round pick in the 2024 NWSL Draft. She made only three appearances during the club's inaugural season due to surgery on a lingering ankle injury. The club finished their first season in eighth place with a 8–9–5 record.

Video
- Bicycle kick goal by Leroux on YouTube

During the 2023 season, Leroux scored her first goal for Angel City after returning from surgery and recovery in a 2–1 loss against the Chicago Red Stars. She notched a bicycle kick goal and assist in a 5–1 rout against Portland Thorns FC on October 15. Angel City finished in fifth place during the regular season and advanced to the playoffs for the first time where they were eliminated by OL Reign in the quarter final match.

On May 3, 2024, during an away match against the Utah Royals which ended as a 2–1 victory, Leroux scored her second goal of the 2024 season which was her 43rd career goal in the NWSL, tying her for 10th in the NWSL's all-time top scorers with Carli Lloyd. On May 18, 2024, in an away match against Washington Spirit which ended as 2–4 defeat, Leroux scored her third goal of the season, her 44th in the NWSL overall, surpassing Lloyd and solidifying her spot in the top 10 all-time scorers. The goal also tied her with Alyssa Thompson as Angel City's third all-time goal scorers. In the home game against Racing Louisville on June 19, 2024, Leroux scored in the 85th minute, scoring the winning goal to secure a 3–2 win for her team. Leroux made her 150th NWSL regular season appearance on June 30, 2024, in a home match against her former club Orlando Pride. Leroux scored the 100th goal in Angel City's club history on October 20, 2024, an equalizer to secure a 1–1 draw in the final home match of the season against Utah Royals. On October 29, 2024, Angel City announced that they had signed a new contract with Leroux, keeping her at the club until 2027. Leroux described this as her "last go" and that she would end her career with Angel City.

In 2025, Leroux announced the day before Angel City's first game that she would "step away from soccer for my mental health", also saying she would return at some point. She did not play that season but as of 2026 remains on Angel City's roster.

On August 16, 2026, more than 600 days after her last appearance with Angel City, Leroux resumed her professional career when she came on in the 92nd minute of the match against Washington Spirit.

== International career ==
=== Youth national teams ===
By virtue of her parents' nationalities, Leroux was eligible to represent either Canada or the United States. Playing for Canada at the age of 14, she was the youngest individual to participate in the 2004 FIFA U-19 Women's World Cup, held in Thailand. She served as captain of Canada's under-15 team that traveled to Germany in 2005.

Leroux received clearance from FIFA to change her allegiance to the United States. In January 2006, she was named to the United States under-16 national team. In 2008 she helped the under-20 national team win the 2008 FIFA U-20 Women's World Cup in Santiago, Chile. She scored in the first half of the final against North Korea. She also represented the United States at the 2010 FIFA U-20 Women's World Cup and ended her under-20 career as the country's all-time leading scorer in Under-20 Women's World Cup play with 10 goals. At the under-20 level, she is among the country's most capped players with 36 games and is the all-time leading scorer for the U.S. with 30 goals. In 2012, she was named the 2011 U.S. Soccer Young Female Athlete of the Year, playing for both the senior and under-23 national teams.

=== U.S. senior national team ===
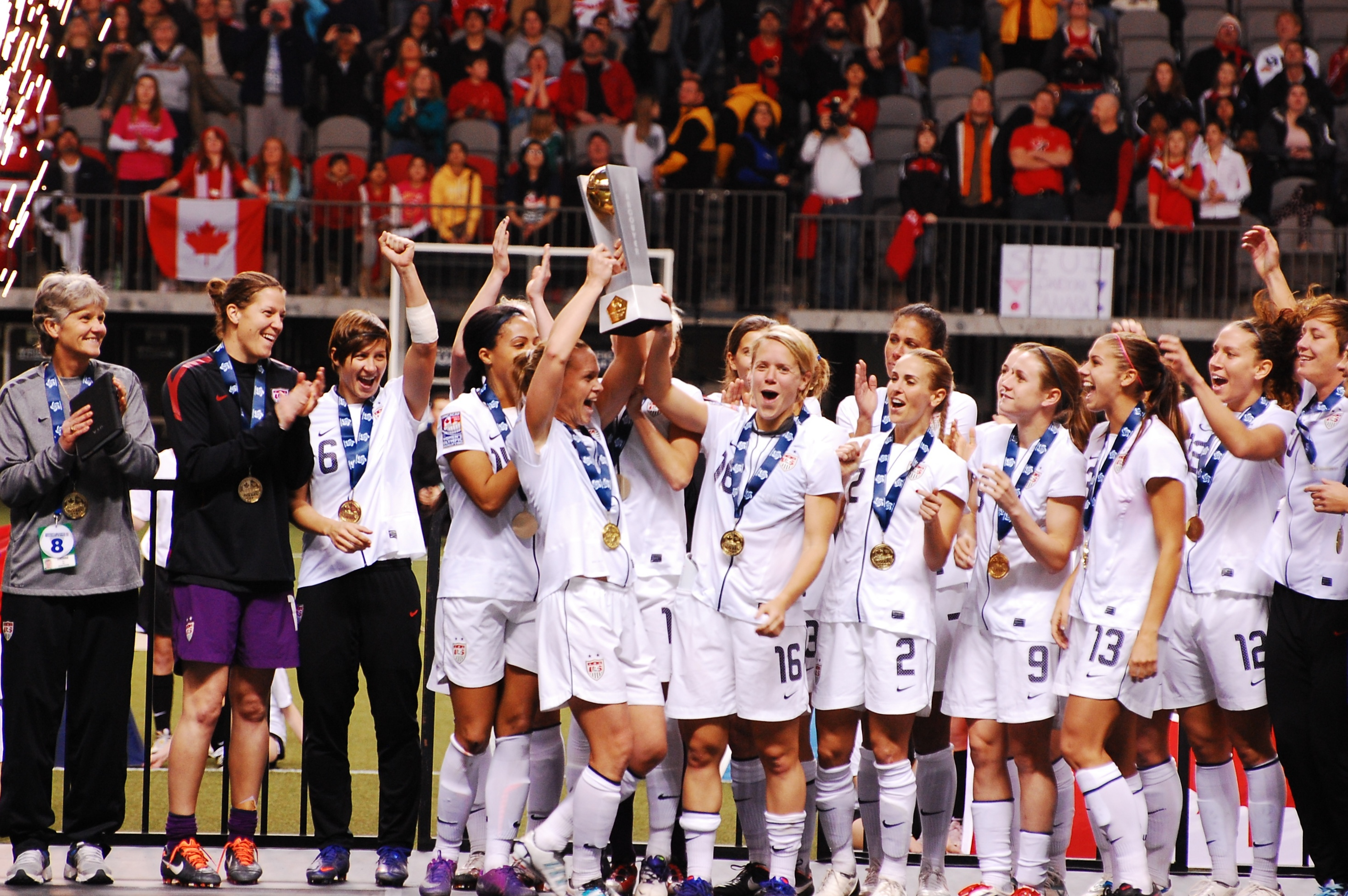
Leroux (fourth from left) celebrates with her national teammates after winning first place at the 2012 CONCACAF Olympic Qualifiers.

Leroux played at the 2012 CONCACAF Women's Olympic Qualifying Tournament as a member of the United States senior national team. In her second cap for the senior side, Leroux scored five goals in a CONCACAF Olympic qualifying match between the U.S. and Guatemala; the final score of the match was 13–0. Leroux's performance tied the record for goals scored in a single match by one player in a CONCACAF Olympic Qualifying Tournament. She also tied the single-game record for the national team, equaling previous performances by her teammates Amy Rodriguez and Abby Wambach in 2012 and 2004 respectively.

In 2012, Leroux set a new team scoring record as a reserve on the team with 12 goals scored off the bench in one year. The previous record of nine goals was set by Debbie Keller in 1998.

==== From Algarve to the London Olympics, 2012 ====
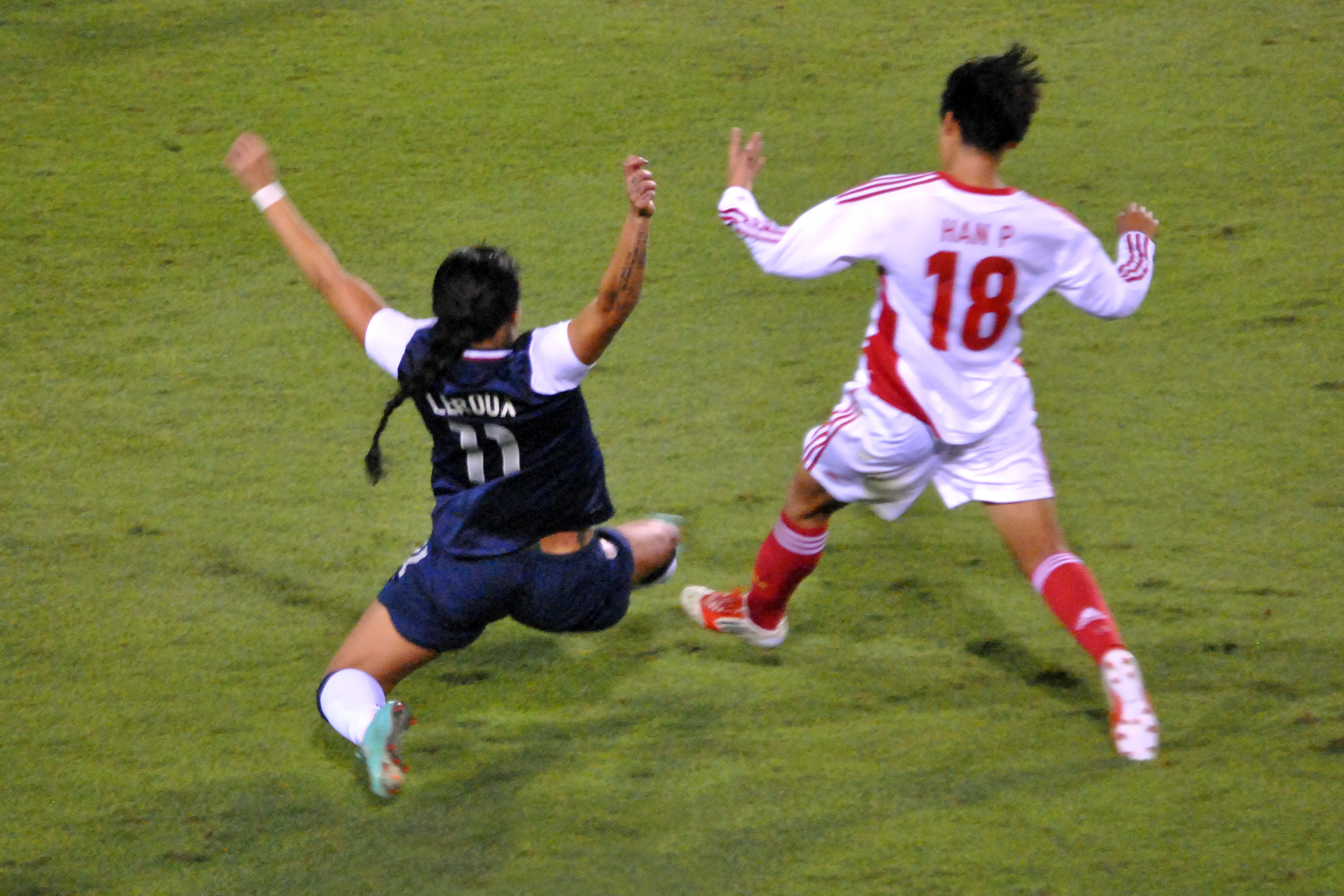
Leroux (left) during a friendly match against China on December 15, 2012.

During the 2012 Algarve Cup in Portugal, Leroux scored the team's fifth goal in the 93rd minute of the U.S.' first group stage match against Denmark, in which the U.S. won 5–0. During the team's second group stage match, she scored the game-winning goal against Norway in the 81st minute. After losing to Japan in the third group stage match, the team defeated Sweden 4–0 to clinch third place at the tournament.

Leroux was the youngest player and a goal-scoring member of the Olympic gold medal-winning team at the 2012 Summer Olympics in London. She scored the second goal against New Zealand during the quarter final match of the tournament helping the U.S. win 2–0.

==== Algarve Cup, Controversy in Toronto, 2013 ====
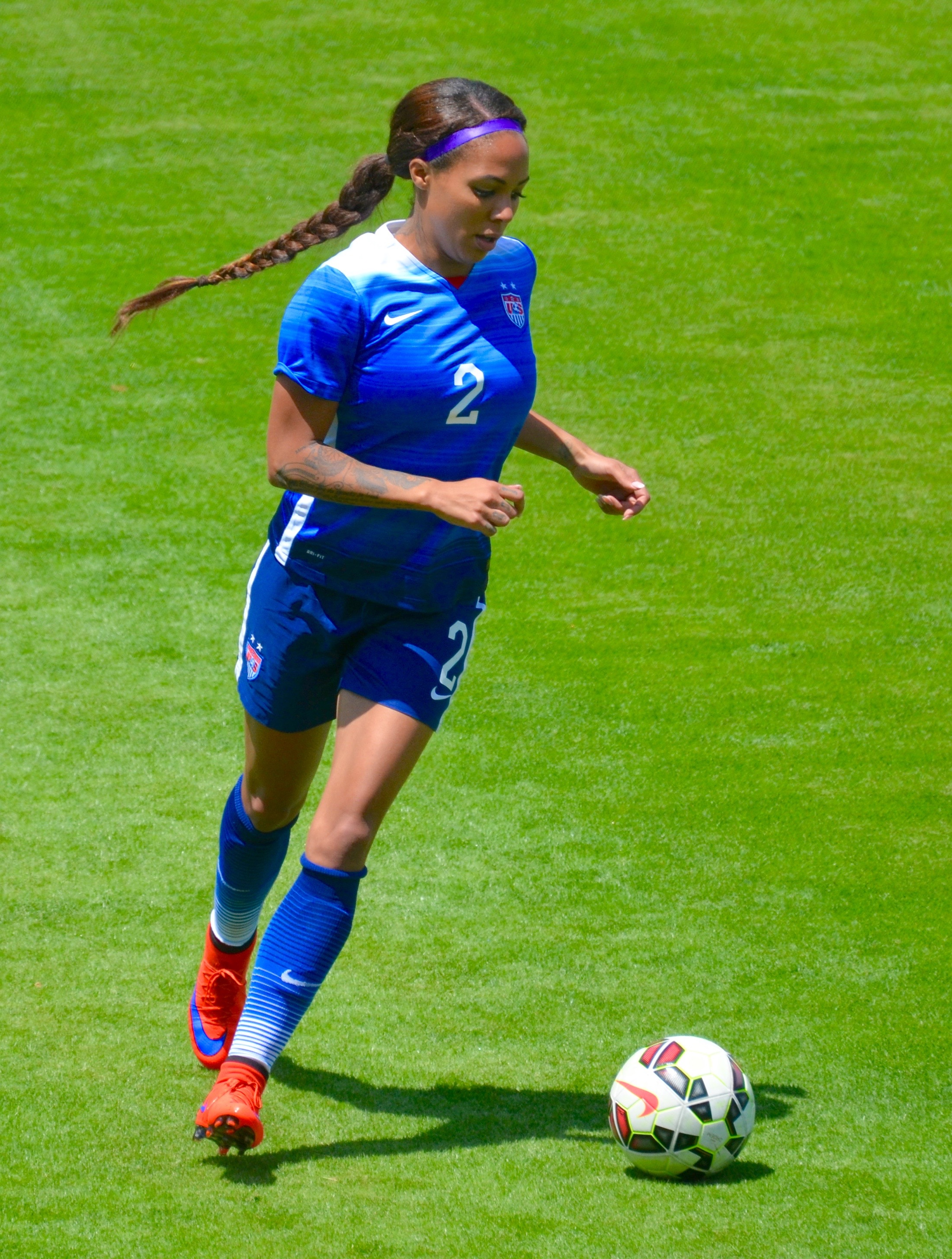
San Jose, California, 2015

During the team's second group stage match at the 2013 Algarve Cup, Leroux opened the scoring for the U.S. when she netted a goal in the 13th minute. Her goal was followed by four others from her teammates resulting in a 5–0 win over China. The U.S. went on to win the tournament after defeating Germany 2–0 in the final.

External videos
- Leroux's goal against Canada on June 2, 2013 retrieved November 1, 2014

While playing in a sold-out friendly match against Canada at BMO Field in Toronto, Ontario in June 2013, Leroux was booed by Canadian fans throughout the match. After scoring during stoppage time to bring the score to 3–0 in favor of the U.S., Leroux celebrated her goal by hushing the crowd and pointing to the U.S. emblem on her jersey which further inflamed many fans in the crowd. After the game, she stated via Twitter, "When you chant racial slurs, taunt me and talk about my family don't be mad when I shush you and show pride in what I represent. #america." The U.S. Soccer Federation announced that Leroux had "endured abuse both verbally and in social media" since switching to the U.S. national soccer team; however, Leroux later clarified that no such incidents took place at BMO Field. "My tweet from this morning wasn't in response to anything from yesterday's match at BMO Field. In fact, the atmosphere at the stadium was a positive step forward for women's soccer. Unfortunately, the type of abuse I have received in the past and via social media for my decision to play for the United States is a step backwards. That is what prompted my response in the heat of the moment."

During a friendly against Mexico in September 2013, Leroux scored a hat trick in nine minutes, helping the U.S. win 7–0.

==== 2015 FIFA Women's World Cup ====
Leroux was on the roster of the United States team for the 2015 FIFA Women's World Cup. She saw action in four of the seven games, recording an assist to a Christen Press goal in the opening game against Australia. She did not play in the Final against Japan

==== Post World Cup ====
On July 17, 2015, it was announced that Leroux would undergo ankle surgery, which would sideline her for three months. As a result, she would miss the remainder of the 2015 NWSL Season and the U.S. WNT World Cup Victory Tour.

Leroux announced her pregnancy on January 26, 2016; as a result, she did not play in 2016.

On May 27, 2017, Leroux was named to the U.S. Roster for a set of friendlies in Scandinavia. This was her first time suiting up for the U.S. since giving birth to her son. Leroux did not play in either game. Leroux was named to the roster for the 2017 Tournament of Nations. She didn't play in the first match for the U.S., but entered as a second-half substitute in their second match against Brazil. This was her first appearance for the U.S. since the semi-final of the 2015 World Cup, on June 30, 2015.

Leroux has not received a call-up since the 2017 Tournament of Nations, and she was not listed on the 35 player provisional roster for the 2018 CONCACAF Women's Championship.

== Personal life ==
Leroux holds dual citizenship in Canada and the United States. Her nickname is "Syd the Kid". Her chihuahua, "Boss Leroux," has thousands of Twitter followers and was often featured in the media along with Sydney.

Leroux became engaged to Canadian Major League Baseball player Brett Lawrie, a childhood acquaintance, in October 2010 before the engagement was called off the following year.

Leroux was previously in a relationship with English-born MLS player Dom Dwyer from 2014. On February 14, 2015 (Valentine's Day, or 2–14; her USWNT jersey number is 2 and Dwyer's is 14), it was announced that she and Dwyer had wed in January 2015 in a private ceremony. On January 25, 2016, Sydney announced on social media that she was expecting the couple's first child in September 2016. Cassius Cruz Dwyer was born on September 10, 2016. On November 28, 2018, they announced they were expecting their second child. In March 2019, at six months pregnant, Leroux was photographed participating in light preseason training with the image drawing both criticism and praise. Their daughter, Roux James Dwyer, was born on June 28, 2019. She returned to playing three months after giving birth. On August 6, 2021, Leroux announced she and Dwyer were divorcing after six years of marriage.

Leroux is currently in a relationship with NBA agent Dave Spahn.

== Endorsements ==
Leroux has appeared in several advertisements and promotional pieces for Nike. In December 2013, she and national teammate Alex Morgan were featured in Nike's "Winning in a Winter Wonderland" commercial along with other professional athletes including Robinson Canó, Justin Tuck, and Julia Mancuso. In June 2014, she signed an endorsement deal with Nestlé Nesquik. The same month, she made a cameo appearance in a commercial for Beats by Dre in preparation for the 2014 FIFA World Cup. In June 2014, she became the first female endorser for the sports drink company BODYARMOR, joining fellow professional athletes Richard Sherman, Kevin Love, and James Harden. In 2022, Sydney partnered with DIRECTV to release the Undercover Coach video, promoting the brand's partnership with LeagueSide and reminding us the future is female.

== In popular culture ==
=== Television and video ===
Leroux was the focus of an ESPN feature entitled Living Her Dream, which profiled her evolution as an international soccer player. She was a guest on Canada's Breakfast Television in August 2012 following the 2012 Olympics. In October 2013, she was interviewed by Grete Eliassen for an ESPNW short feature, Q&A With Sydney Leroux. The same month, she was profiled in Fox Soccer Exclusive: Sydney Leroux for Fox Soccer Channel. In December 2013, Leroux was featured in episode 9 of AOL's online series, My Ink. Leroux appeared as a dining room guest on an episode of Hell's Kitchen.

=== Magazines ===
Leroux was one of 21 professional athletes featured in ESPN's The Body Issue in 2013. She appeared nude on one of eight covers for the magazine. Of the experience she said,

I think a lot of females struggle with the way they look, and I wanted to show that everyone's body is different. I think it's a big deal to be an athlete and feel confident in your body and show it off. I'm not going to say I've never struggled with how I look, but I've reached a point in my life where I'm happy with who I am.

In May 2015, Leroux was featured on the cover of ESPN Magazine with teammates Abby Wambach and Alex Morgan.

In 2023, Leroux was one of the women featured in Women's Health's Body Issue magazine.

=== Video games ===
Leroux has featured along with her national teammates in multiple editions of the EA Sports' FIFA video game series with FIFA 16 the first to include female players.

=== Ticker tape parade and White House honor ===
Following the United States' win at the 2015 FIFA Women's World Cup, Leroux and her teammates became the first women's sports team to be honored with a ticker tape parade in New York City. Each player received a key to the city from Mayor Bill de Blasio. In October of the same year, the team was honored by President Barack Obama at the White House.

== Career statistics ==
=== Club ===
As of November 1, 2024.

Club	Season	League			Cup		Other (Note: Includes NWSL Fall Series, NWSL Playoffs)		Total	
Club	Season	Division	Apps	Goals	Apps	Goals	Apps	Goals	Apps	Goals
Vancouver Whitecaps	2011	W-League	11	11	–		–		11	11
Seattle Sounders	2012	W-League	2	2	–		–		2	2
Seattle Sounders	W-League Total		13	13	-	-	-	-	13	13
Boston Breakers	2013	NWSL	19	11	–		–		19	11
Seattle Reign	2014	NWSL	22	5	–		–		22	5
Western New York Flash	2015	NWSL	3	1	–		–		3	1
FC Kansas City	2017	NWSL	23	6	–		–		23	6
Orlando Pride	2018	NWSL	20	6	–		–		20	6
Orlando Pride	2019	NWSL	3	0	–		–		3	0
Orlando Pride	2020	NWSL	–		–		3	1	3	1
Orlando Pride	2021	NWSL	23	8	4	1	–		27	9
Orlando Pride	2022	NWSL	7	2	3	0	–		10	2
Angel City FC	2022	NWSL	3	0	0	0	–		3	0
Angel City FC	2023	NWSL	13	2	0	0	1	0	14	2
Angel City FC	2024	NWSL	25	7	1	1	1	0	27	7
Angel City FC	2025	NWSL	0	0	–		–		0	0
Angel City FC	NWSL Total		161	48	8	2	5	1	174	51
Career total			174	61	8	2	5	1	187	64

=== International goals ===
Goal	Date	Location	Opponent	Assist	Score	Result	Competition
1.	January 22, 2012	Vancouver	Guatemala	Alex Morgan	7–0	13–0	2012 CONCACAF Olympic qualifier: Group B
2.	January 22, 2012	Vancouver	Guatemala	Amy Rodriguez	8–0	13–0	2012 CONCACAF Olympic qualifier: Group B
3.	January 22, 2012	Vancouver	Guatemala	Alex Morgan	9–0	13–0	2012 CONCACAF Olympic qualifier: Group B
4.	January 22, 2012	Vancouver	Guatemala	Kelley O'Hara	10–0	13–0	2012 CONCACAF Olympic qualifier: Group B
5.	January 22, 2012	Vancouver	Guatemala	Amy Rodriguez	13–0	13–0	2012 CONCACAF Olympic qualifier: Group B
6.	February 22, 2012	Lagos	Denmark	Stephanie Cox	5–0	5–0	2012 Algarve Cup
7.	March 2, 2012	Lagos	Norway	Amy Rodriguez	2–0	2–0	2012 Algarve Cup
8.	August 3, 2012	Newcastle upon Tyne	New Zealand	Tobin Heath	2–0	2–0	2012 Olympics: Quarter-final
9.	September 1, 2012	Rochester	Costa Rica	Alex Morgan	6–0	8–0	Friendly
10.	September 19, 2012	Commerce City	Australia	Megan Rapinoe	6–2	6–2	Friendly
11.	November 28, 2012	Portland	Republic of Ireland	Heather O'Reilly	4–0	5–0	Friendly
12.	November 28, 2012	Portland	Republic of Ireland	Amy Rodriguez	5–0	5–0	Friendly
13.	December 8, 2012	Detroit	China	Alex Morgan	2–0	2–0	Friendly
14.	December 15, 2012	Boca Raton	China	Heather Mitts	4–1	4–1	Friendly
15.	February 9, 2013	Jacksonville	Scotland	Yael Averbuch	4–1	4–1	Friendly
16.	March 8, 2013	Albufeira	China	Alex Morgan	1–0	5–0	2013 Algarve Cup
17.	June 2, 2013	Toronto	Canada	Abby Wambach	3–0	3–0	Friendly
18.	September 3, 2013	Washington, D.C.	Mexico	Abby Wambach	2–0	7–0	Friendly
19.	September 3, 2013	Washington, D.C.	Mexico	Lauren Holiday	3–0	7–0	Friendly
20.	September 3, 2013	Washington, D.C.	Mexico	Abby Wambach	4–0	7–0	Friendly
21.	September 3, 2013	Washington, D.C.	Mexico	Lauren Holiday	5–0	7–0	Friendly
22.	October 30, 2013	Columbus	New Zealand	Kristie Mewis	1–0	1–1	Friendly
23.	November 10, 2013	Orlando	Brazil	Heather O'Reilly	1–0	4–1	Friendly
24.	November 10, 2013	Orlando	Brazil	Unassisted	3–1	4–1	Friendly
25.	January 31, 2014	Frisco	Canada	Becky Sauerbrunn	1–0	1–0	Friendly
26.	February 8, 2014	Boca Raton	Russia	Lauren Holiday	5–0	7–0	Friendly
27.	March 5, 2014	Parchal	Japan	Unassisted	1–0	1–1	2014 Algarve Cup
28.	March 10, 2014	Parchal	Denmark	Stephanie Cox	2–4	3–5	2014 Algarve Cup
29.	April 10, 2014	San Diego	China	Megan Rapinoe	3–0	3–0	Friendly
30.	May 8, 2014	Winnipeg	Canada	Unassisted	1–1	1–1	Friendly
31.	June 14, 2014	Tampa	France	Christen Press	1–0	1–0	Friendly
32.	September 13, 2014	Sandy	Mexico	Lauren Holiday	7–0	8–0	Friendly
33.	October 26, 2014	Chester	Costa Rica	Tobin Heath	6–0	6–0	2014 CONCACAF Championship: Final
34.	May 17, 2015	Carson	Mexico	Megan Rapinoe	1–0	5–1	Friendly
35.	May 17, 2015	Carson	Mexico	Morgan Brian	4–1	5–1	Friendly

== Honors ==
Seattle Reign FC

- NWSL Shield: 2014

United States

- FIFA Women's World Cup: 2015
- Olympic Gold Medal: 2012
- CONCACAF Women's Championship: 2014
- CONCACAF Women's Olympic Qualifying Tournament: 2012
- Algarve Cup: 2013, 2015

United States U20

- FIFA U-20 Women's World Cup: 2008
- CONCACAF Women's U-20 Championship: 2010; runner-up: 2008

Individual

- FIFA U-20 Women's World Cup Golden Boot: 2008
- FIFA U-20 Women's World Cup Golden Ball: 2008
- FIFA U-20 Women's World Cup Bronze Ball: 2010
- FIFA U-20 Women's World Cup All-star team: 2008, 2010
- CONCACAF Women's U-20 Championship Golden Boot: 2010
- CONCACAF Women's U-20 Championship Golden Ball: 2010
- U.S. Soccer Young Female Athlete of the Year: 2011
- NWSL Best XI: 2013
- Little League Hall of Excellence induction: 2017
- NWSL Second XI: 2021

== See also ==
- List of FIFA Women's World Cup winning players
- List of Olympic medalists in football
- List of UCLA professional athletes
