= Alex Arlitt =

American soccer player (born 1993)

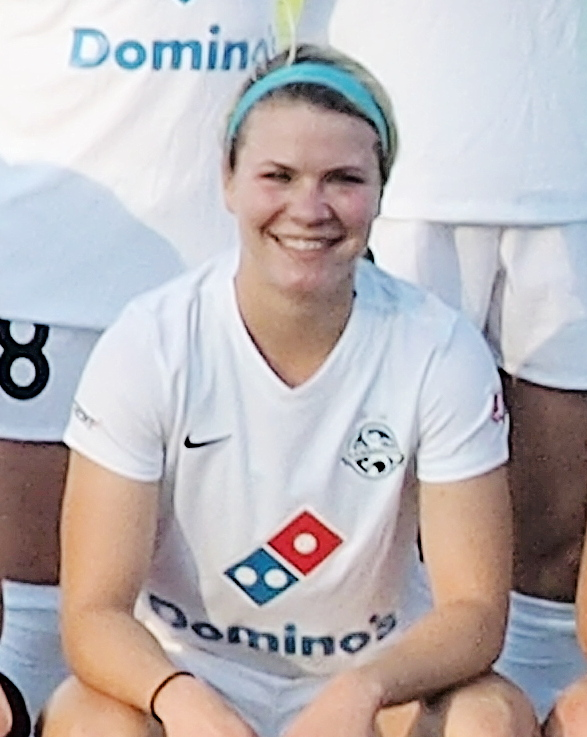
- Arlitt with FC Kansas City in 2016

Personal information
- Full name: Alexis Elaine Arlitt
- Date of birth: August 25, 1993 (age 33)
- Place of birth: Houston, Texas
- Height: 5 ft 5 in (1.65 m)
- Position: Defender

College career
Years	Team	Apps	(Gls)
2011–2015	LSU Tigers	89	(9)

Senior career*
Years	Team	Apps	(Gls)
2016–2017	FC Kansas City	11	(0)
2016–2017	Western Sydney Wanderers	5	(0)
2018	Utah Royals FC	0	(0)
- * Club domestic league appearances and goals as of October 24, 2017

Alexis Elaine Arlitt (born August 25, 1993) is an American former soccer player who played as a defender for FC Kansas City in the NWSL.

== Early career ==
She attended Clear Lake High School in Houston.

=== College ===
Arlitt played college soccer for the LSU Tigers from 2011 to 2015.

After an ankle injury forced her to miss all but four matches during the 2014 season, she applied for a medical redshirt, and was granted a fifth year of eligibility for the 2015 season.

== Club career ==
=== FC Kansas City, 2016–2017 ===
Arlitt was drafted by FC Kansas City in the 4th round of the 2016 NWSL College Draft. She signed with FC Kansas City in April 2016. Arlitt was injured for seven weeks during the 2016 season with a stress reaction in her left fibula. She missed the entire 2017 season with a left knee injury.

==== Western Sydney Wanderers, 2016–2017 (loan) ====
In September 2016, Arlitt joined Australian club Western Sydney Wanderers on loan for the 2016–17 W-League season. She played five games for Western Sydney Wanderers, but was then injured and subsequently missed FC Kansas City's season.

=== Utah Royals FC, 2018 ===
After FC Kansas City ceased operations, Arlitt officially joined the Utah Royals FC on February 12, 2018. Arlitt began the 2018 season on the 45-Day Disabled List (D45) as she was still recovering from a knee injury. On June 21 she was transferred to the Season Ending Injury List (SEI), meaning she would miss the entire NWSL season for the second straight year. On October 1, 2018, Utah declined Arlitt's contract option and she was placed on the Re-Entry Wire, where she was not claimed by another team.
