= List of FC Kansas City players =

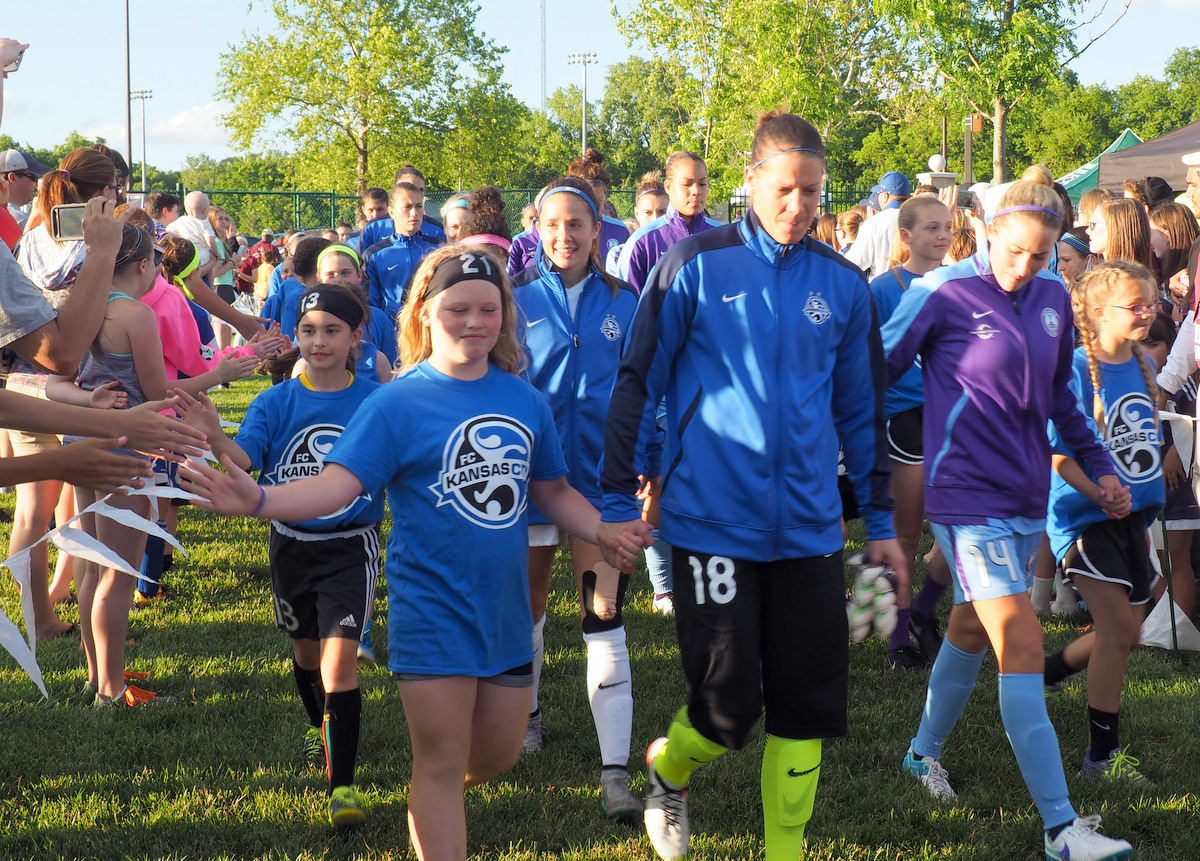
Nicole Barnhart (center) led all FC Kansas City players in total appearances, and is the only player to surpass 100 appearances with the club

FC Kansas City (FCKC) was an American women's soccer club which began play in the National Women's Soccer League (NWSL) in its inaugural season of 2013 and was dissolved after the 2017 season in November 2017.

The club swept all of the 2013 season's annual NWSL awards and won two consecutive NWSL Championships in 2014 and 2015.

After folding, its roster was relocated to Salt Lake City, Utah-based expansion team Utah Royals FC, which also folded in 2020. The roster was then relocated back to Kansas City to the expansion team Kansas City Current, the successor to FC Kansas City, which began play in the NWSL in 2021 season as Kansas City NWSL.

All FC Kansas City players who have appeared for the team in an official competition or have been contracted to play for the team are listed below.

== Key ==
- The list is ordered first by total number of appearances, then by number of regular-season appearances, and then if necessary in alphabetical order.
- Appearances as a substitute are included.
- Statistics are correct as of September 29, 2017, the end of the 2017 NWSL season.

Positions key
GK	Goalkeeper
DF	Defender
MF	Midfielder
FW	Forward

Nationality
Unless otherwise noted, the nationality of a player is determined by the country they most recently represented in international play, or if said player has not played international football then by their country of birth.
Position
Playing positions are listed according to the player's roster designation as of the list's most recent update.
FCKC career
FCKC career is defined as the first and last calendar years in which the player was rostered for the club in any of the competitions listed below.
Appearances
This list counts appearances only in official NWSL competitions, including the NWSL regular season and playoffs.

== Players ==
Player				Appearances		
Name	Nat.	Pos.	FCKC career	NWSL	Playoffs	Total
Nicole Barnhart	(United States) USA	GK	2013–2017	103	5	108
Erika Tymrak	(United States) USA	FW	2013–2017	90	5	95
Becky Sauerbrunn	(United States) USA	DF	2013–2017	88	5	93
Jen Buczkowski	(United States) USA	DF	2013–2016	71	5	76
Leigh Ann Brown	(United States) USA	DF	2013–2015	65	5	70
Yael Averbuch	(United States) USA	DF	2015–2017	61	2	63
Desiree Scott	(Canada) CAN	MF	2013, 2016–2017	55	1	56
Shea Groom	(United States) USA	FW	2015–2017	54	2	56
Frances Silva	(United States) USA	FW	2014–2016	52	1	53
Lauren Holiday	(United States) USA	FW	2013–2015	48	5	53
Merritt Mathias	(United States) USA	DF	2013–2014	42	3	45
Brittany Kolmel	(United States) USA	DF	2016–2017	43	0	43
Rebecca Moros	(United States) USA	DF	2015, 2017	39	2	41
Mandy Laddish	(United States) USA	MF	2014–2017	37	2	39
Amy Rodriguez	(United States) USA	FW	2014–2015, 2017	34	4	38
Amy LePeilbet	(United States) USA	DF	2014–2015	31	4	35
Katie Bowen	(New Zealand) NZL	DF	2016–2017	34	0	34
Lo'eau LaBonta	(United States) USA	MF	2016–2017	33	0	33
Liz Bogus	(United States) USA	FW	2014–2015	31	1	32
Sarah Hagen	(United States) USA	FW	2014–2015	26	3	29
Heather O'Reilly	(United States) USA	FW	2015–2016	25	2	27
Alexa Newfield	(United States) USA	FW	2016–2017	25	0	25
Nikki Phillips	(Poland) POL	DF	2014	23	2	25
Christina Gibbons	(United States) USA	MF	2017	24	0	24
Jenna Richmond	(United States) USA	MF	2014	22	2	24
Caroline Kastor	(United States) USA	FW	2015–2016	23	0	23
Sydney Leroux	(United States) USA	FW	2017	23	0	23
Melissa Henderson	(United States) USA	FW	2013–2014	22	1	23
Courtney Jones	(United States) USA	DF	2013	22	1	23
Maegan Rosa	(Canada) CAN	MF	2017	22	0	22
Brittany Ratcliffe	(United States) USA	MF	2017	21	0	21
Kristie Mewis	(United States) USA	DF	2013	20	1	21
Lauren Sesselmann	(Canada) CAN	DF	2013	19	1	20
Kassey Kallman	(United States) USA	DF	2014	18	2	20
Sinead Farrelly	(Republic of Ireland) IRL	MF	2013	16	1	17
Tiffany McCarty	(United States) USA	FW	2016	16	0	16
Alex Arlitt	(United States) USA	DF	2016–2017	12	0	12
Renae Cuéllar	(Mexico) MEX	FW	2013	11	0	11
Caroline Flynn	(United States) USA	MF	2017	10	0	10
Katrina Gorry	(Australia) AUS	MF	2014	9	1	10
Morgan Marlborough	(United States) USA	FW	2014	9	0	9
Nia Williams	(United States) USA	DF	2013–2014	9	0	9
Katie Kelly	(United States) USA	DF	2013	7	0	7
Teresa Noyola	(Mexico) MEX	FW	2013	7	0	7
Brianne Reed	(Dominican Republic) DOM	DF	2016–2017	7	0	7
Meghan Lisenby	(United States) USA	DF	2015	5	0	5
Sydney Miramontez	(United States) USA	DF	2017	5	0	5
Casey Loyd	(United States) USA	MF	2013	4	1	5
Tiffany Weimer	(United States) USA	FW	2016	4	0	4
Amanda Frisbie	(United States) USA	DF	2016	3	0	3
Molly Menchel	(United States) USA	DF	2016	3	0	3
Katelyn Rowland	(United States) USA	GK	2015–2016	3	0	3
Missy Geha	(United States) USA	MF	2013–2014	2	0	2
Bianca Henninger	(Mexico) MEX	GK	2013	2	0	2
Sara Keane	(United States) USA	GK	2014	2	0	2
Tiffany Cameron	(Jamaica) JAM	FW	2013	1	0	1
Kaysie Clark	(United States) USA	MF	2015	1	0	1
Molly Dreska	(United States) USA	MF	2014	1	0	1
Jaime French	(United States) USA	FW	2013	1	0	1
Natalie Norris	(United States) USA	DF	2013	1	0	1
Catherine Parkhill	(United States) USA	GK	2016–2017	0	0	0

== See also ==
- List of Utah Royals FC players
- List of Kansas City Current players
- List of top-division football clubs in CONCACAF countries
- List of professional sports teams in the United States and Canada
