= 2013 FC Kansas City season =

FC Kansas City
2013 season
- Owner: Brian Budzinski; Chris Likens; Brad Likens; Greg Likens
- Head coach: Vlatko Andonovski
- Stadium: Shawnee Mission District Stadium
- NWSL: 2nd
- NWSL Playoffs: Semifinals
- Top goalscorer: Lauren Cheney (12)
- Highest home attendance: 6,784 (Apr 13 vs. POR)
- Lowest home attendance: 3,057 (Jun 23 vs. WAS)
- Average home league attendance: 4,604
- Biggest win: 3–0 (Jul 24 vs. BOS)
- Biggest defeat: 1–3 (Jun 16 vs. CHI)
Home colors	Away colors	Third colors

The 2013 season was FC Kansas City's first season of existence, in which they competed in the National Women's Soccer League (NWSL), the top division of women's soccer in the United States.

== Background ==
On January 11, 2013, FC Kansas City announced a new logo, which would remain the club's logo until its dissolution in 2017. The team was the league's first to unveil its kits in March, using the same standard templates as the rest of the league in blue, white, and black colors. Overland Park-based Title Boxing Club sponsored the fronts of the shirts.

== Summary ==
=== Founding ===
In November 2012, it was confirmed that a Kansas City-based women's professional soccer team had been accepted into a new women's professional soccer league, later named National Women's Soccer League. The KC ownership group was composed of Chris Likens, his two sons Brad and Greg Likens, and Brian Budzinski, the same owners of the Missouri Comets of the Major Indoor Soccer League.

=== Preseason transactions ===
On January 14, 2013, as part of the NWSL Player Allocation, Nicole Barnhart (USA), Lauren Cheney (USA), Renae Cuéllar (MEX), Marylin Diaz (MEX), Becky Sauerbrunn (USA), Desiree Scott (CAN), and Lauren Sesselmann (CAN) were named to the team.

On January 18, the team selected Kristie Mewis, Erika Tymrak, Whitney Berry, and Nia Williams in the 2013 NWSL College Draft. The team signed Sinead Farrelly, Jen Buczkowski, and Leigh Ann Robinson as free agents.

During the February 7 Supplemental Draft, the Blues selected Courtney Jones, Bianca Henninger, Merritt Mathias, Casey Nogueira, Tina DiMartino, and Casey Berrier.

FC Kansas City held open tryouts in February, calling back nine players to be amateur reserves of the 65 who attended: forward Gisela Arrieta, goalkeeper Colleen Boyd, forward Ariana Calderon, defender Natalie Carter, midfielder Molly Dreska, midfielder Jaime French, defender Natalie Norris, forward Andrea Rodriguez, and midfielder Vendula Strnadova.

=== Regular season ===
On April 13, 2013, FC Kansas City hosted Portland Thorns FC in the first regular-season match in NWSL history. In the 3rd minute of the match, Renae Cuéllar scored the first goal in the histories of both FC Kansas City and the NWSL. The match drew a sellout crowd of 6,784 and ended in a 1–1 draw.

Due to the search for suspects in the Boston Marathon bombing, the Boston Breakers were unable to travel to Kansas City for their scheduled match against Kansas City on April 19, resulting in a postponement. Kansas City won its first game in its second match, defeating Seattle Reign FC 2–0 at home on April 26.

On July 1, head coach Vlatko Andonovski traded Cuéllar to Seattle Reign FC for Teresa Noyola.

FC Kansas City clinched its first playoff qualification after defeating Portland Thorns FC 3–2 on August 4, with Lauren Holiday scoring a brace and Kristie Mewis scoring the match-winning goal in the 74th minute. The road match set a league attendance record of 17,619.

However, despite opportunities to clinch the NWSL Shield, Kansas City lost to the Boston Breakers on August 10 and the Chicago Red Stars on August 18, resulting in a three-way tie atop the table for points. With the league's first tiebreaker being head-to-head record, the Western New York Flash won the 2013 Shield, Kansas City finished second, and Portland finished third.

The loss to the Breakers snapped a 10-match unbeaten streak, the season's longest, and was the last time an opponent would shutout Kansas City in any competition until Sky Blue FC in the opening match of the 2015 season, a streak of 25 regular-season matches and 28 including playoffs. The team's 11 shutouts on the season set a league record that stood until North Carolina Courage recorded 12 in the 2017 season, which was two matches longer.

=== Postseason ===
On August 24, Kansas City hosted Portland in the first-ever NWSL Playoffs match in the league's history. After taking a 2–0 lead at halftime on goals by Erika Tymrak and Melissa Henderson, Portland scored twice in the second half to draw in regulation and force extra time. Thorns midfielder Allie Long scored the match-winning goal in the 103rd minute and Kansas City were unable to equalize, eliminating Kansas City from the postseason. The loss was the seventh time in all of the season's competitions that Kansas City had led by two or more goals during a match but failed to win.

=== Honors ===
FC Kansas City swept the league's postseason individual awards, led by Holiday winning the golden boot and most valuable player awards. Her 12 goals and 9 assists led the league in both categories, and she scored a goal or assist in 10 consecutive appearances, interrupted only by international duty and her wedding to Jrue Holiday.

== Stadium ==
On February 6, the club announced its home matches would be played at Shawnee Mission District Stadium in Overland Park, Kansas, a 6,150-capacity high-school gridiron football and track and field stadium with artificial turf. Season tickets were initially priced from $135 to $255.

== Club ==
=== Roster ===
As of August 1, 2013.

No.	Pos.	Nation	Player
1	GK	USA	Bianca Henninger
2	FW	USA	Melissa Henderson
3	FW	CAN	Tiffany Cameron
4	DF	USA	Becky Sauerbrunn
6	MF	USA	Jen Buczkowski
7	FW	USA	Casey Loyd
8	DF	USA	Courtney Jones
9	DF	USA	Merritt Mathias
10	MF	MEX	Teresa Noyola
11	MF	CAN	Desiree Scott
12	FW	USA	Lauren Cheney
13	DF	USA	Leigh Ann Robinson
14	DF	CAN	Lauren Sesselmann
15	MF	USA	Erika Tymrak
16	DF	USA	Nia Williams
17	MF	USA	Sinead Farrelly
18	GK	USA	Nicole Barnhart
19	MF	USA	Kristie Mewis
20	DF	USA	Katie Kelly
22	DF	USA	Natalie Norris (reserve)
23	MF	USA	Missy Geha (reserve)
26	FW	USA	Jaime French
—	MF	CZE	Vendula Strnadová (reserve)

=== Transactions ===
- July 1: (Mexico) Renae Cuéllar and 3rd-round pick in the 2014 NWSL College Draft traded to Seattle Reign FC for (Mexico) Teresa Noyola, rights to (Poland) Nikki Krzysik, and a 2nd-round pick in the 2014 draft.
- July 31: (United States) Jaime French signed

=== Team management ===
FC Kansas City's ownership group was composed of Chris, Brad and Greg Likens, and Brian Budzinski. The group also owns the Missouri Comets of the Major Indoor Soccer League. Budzinski is also owner of the Kansas City Soccerdome. On December 12, 2012, the team announced the hiring of Vlatko Andonovski, a former professional player and head coach of the Kansas City Kings of the PASL and Missouri Olympic Development Program (ODP), as head coach for the season.

== Competitions ==
Key

Win Draw Loss

=== Preseason ===
April 6, 2013 1	FC Kansas City	8–0	Nebraska Cornhuskers' Women's Soccer	Parkville, Missouri
14:30	Cuéllar 16', 20', 44', 55', 67'; Jones 17'; Farrelly 51'	Report		Stadium: Julian Field; Attendance: 410; Referee: Brandon Marshall

=== NWSL regular season ===
==== Results summary ====
Overall								Home						Away					
Pld	W	D	L	GF	GA	GD	Pts	W	D	L	GF	GA	GD	W	D	L	GF	GA	GD
22	11	5	6	34	22	+12	38	6	2	3	16	7	+9	5	3	3	18	15	+3

Last updated: August 18, 2013.
Source: Match reports

Round	1	2	3	4	5	6	7	8	9	10	11	12	13	14	15	16	17	18	19	20	21	22	23
Stadium	H	H	H	A	A	H	H	A	A	A	H	H	A	H	A	H	A	H	H	A	A	A	H
Result	D	P	W	W	L	W	L	L	W	W	L	W	D	W	D	D	D	W	W	W	W	L	L

Updated to match(es) played on August 18, 2013. Source: Match reports
A = Away; H = Home; W = Win; D = Draw; L = Loss; P = Postponed

==== Matches ====
Kickoff times are in CDT (UTC-05)

April 13, 2013 1	FC Kansas City	1–1	Portland Thorns FC	Overland Park, Kansas
19:35	Cuéllar 3'; Mewis (yellow card) 43'	KC Report; Portland Report	Sinclair 66' (pen.); Washington (yellow card) 70'; Williamson (yellow card) 82'	Stadium: Shawnee Mission District Stadium; Attendance: 6,784; Referee: Kari Seitz

April 20, 2013 2	FC Kansas City	Postponed	Boston Breakers	Overland Park, Kansas
19:35		Boston Marathon bombing		Stadium: Shawnee Mission District Stadium

April 26, 2013 3	FC Kansas City	2–0	Seattle Reign FC	Overland Park, Kansas
19:35	Farrelly 21'; Cuéllar 71'	Report		Stadium: Shawnee Mission District Stadium; Attendance: 4064; Referee: Christina Unkel

May 4, 2013 4	Seattle Reign FC	0–1	FC Kansas City	Tukwila, Washington
22:00	Reed (yellow card) 29'; Fishlock (yellow card) 32'	Report	Sesselmann (yellow card) 58'; Cuéllar 69'	Stadium: Starfire Stadium; Attendance: 2,618; Referee: Margaret Domka

May 11, 2013 5	Western New York Flash	2–1	FC Kansas City	Rochester, New York
18:35	Wambach 34', 39'; Heyboer (yellow card) 95'	Report	Cheney 53'; Sesselmann (yellow card) 91'	Stadium: Sahlen's Stadium; Attendance: 2,738; Referee: Katja Koroleva

May 18, 2013 6	FC Kansas City	2–0	Boston Breakers	Overland Park, Kansas
19:35	Cuéllar 17'; Mathias (yellow card) 23'; Cheney 64'	Report		Stadium: Shawnee Mission District Stadium; Attendance: 4,362; Referee: Miguel Panduro Jr.

May 25, 2013 7	FC Kansas City	0–1	Sky Blue FC	Overland Park, Kansas
19:35	Sesselmann (red card) 22'	Report	Schmidt 23' (pen.)	Stadium: Shawnee Mission District Stadium; Attendance: 4186; Referee: John McCloskey

June 6, 2013 8	Portland Thorns FC	4–3	FC Kansas City	Portland, Oregon
21:30	Morgan 13', 66' (yellow card) 80'; Wetzel 20'; Foxhoven 48'	Report	Cheney 31' (pen.), 56'; Tymrak 81'; Jones (yellow card) 89'	Stadium: JELD-WEN Field; Attendance: 10,886; Referee: Miguel Panduro Jr

June 9, 2013 9	Seattle Reign FC	0–1	FC Kansas City	Tukwila, Washington
21:00	Kyle (yellow card) 92'	Report	Tymrak 63'	Stadium: Starfire Stadium; Attendance: 1,377; Referee: Kara Honthumb

June 13, 2013 10	Chicago Red Stars	0–2	FC Kansas City	Lisle, Illinois
18:30	Vandenbergh (yellow card) 34'	Report	Loyd 27' (pen.); Jones 66'	Stadium: Benedictine University Sports Complex Stadium; Attendance: 1,141; Referee: Josh Wilkens

June 16, 2013 11	FC Kansas City	1–3	Chicago Red Stars	Overland Park, Kansas
15:10	Cuéllar 4'; Wiliams (yellow card) 79'	Report	Grings 29' (yellow card) 43'; Masar 58'; Fuss 91' (pen.)	Stadium: Shawnee Mission District Stadium; Attendance: 3,421; Referee: Juliana Duncan

June 23, 2013 12	FC Kansas City	2–0	Washington Spirit	Overland Park, Kansas
15:10	Cheney 17', 65'	Summary	Pressley (yellow card) 29'	Stadium: Shawnee Mission District Stadium; Attendance: 3,057; Referee: (United States) Katja Koroleva

June 26, 2013 13	Sky Blue FC	2–2	FC Kansas City	Piscataway, New Jersey
19:35	Ocampo 85', 90+2'	Summary	Tymrak 14'; Cheney 74'	Stadium: Yurcak Field; Attendance: 1,126; Referee: (United States) Robert Sibiga

June 30, 2013 14	FC Kansas City	2–0	Portland Thorns FC	Overland Park, Kansas
15:10	Cheney 10'; Mathias 71'	Summary		Stadium: Shawnee Mission District Stadium; Attendance: 4,774; Referee: (United States) Christina Unkel

July 3, 2013 15	Washington Spirit	1–1	FC Kansas City	Germantown, Maryland
18:30	Matheson 86' (pen.)	Report	Tymrak 55'	Stadium: Maryland SoccerPlex; Attendance: 2,467

July 7, 2013 16	FC Kansas City	0–0	Western New York Flash	Overland Park, Kansas
15:10	Robinson (yellow card) 61'	Report	Reynolds (yellow card) 30'	Stadium: Shawnee Mission District Stadium; Attendance: 5,031; Referee: Elvis Mahmutovic

July 14, 2013 17	Chicago Red Stars	3–3	FC Kansas City	Lisle, Illinois
15:00	Dominguez 41'; Masar 90'; Chalupny 96+'	Report	Holiday 17'; Hemmings 43' (o.g.); Tymrak 87'	Stadium: Village of Lisle-Benedictine University Sports Complex; Attendance: 1,549; Referee: Josh Wilkens

July 20, 2013 18	FC Kansas City	2–0	Seattle Reign FC	Overland Park, Kansas
19:35 (PST)	Holiday 39'; Tymrak 86'	Report		Stadium: Shawnee Mission District Stadium; Attendance: 5,271; Referee: Boris Senic

July 24, 2013 2R	FC Kansas City	3–0	Boston Breakers	Overland Park, Kansas
19:35 (PST)	McNeill 72' (o.g.); Jones 85'; Mathias 90'			Stadium: Shawnee Mission District Stadium; Attendance: 5,024

July 28, 2013 19	Sky Blue FC	0–1	FC Kansas City	Piscataway, New Jersey
17:00	Jones 76'			Stadium: Yurcak Field; Attendance: 1,302

August 4, 2013 20	Portland Thorns FC	2–3	FC Kansas City	Portland, Oregon
16:00	Foxhoven 51'; Morgan 89'		Holiday 23' 55'; Mewis 74'	Stadium: JELD-WEN Field; Attendance: 17,619

August 10, 2013 21	Boston Breakers	1–0	FC Kansas City	Somerville, Massachusetts
17:00	Leroux 65'	Report		Stadium: Dilboy Stadium; Attendance: 2,116; Referee: Kara Honthumb

August 18, 2013 22	FC Kansas City	1–2	Chicago Red Stars	Overland Park, Kansas
15:10	Jones 20'	Report	Hoy 45', 92'; Grings (yellow card) 65'; Santacaterina (yellow card) 68'	Stadium: Shawnee Mission District Stadium; Attendance: 4,910; Referee: Elvid Mahmutovic

==== Standings ====
Pos	Team	Pld	W	D	L	GF	GA	GD	Pts	Qualification
1	Western New York Flash	22	10	8	4	36	20	+16	38	NWSL Shield
2	FC Kansas City	22	11	5	6	34	22	+12	38	NWSL Playoffs
3	Portland Thorns FC (C)	22	11	5	6	32	25	+7	38	NWSL Playoffs
4	Sky Blue FC	22	10	6	6	31	26	+5	36	NWSL Playoffs
5	Boston Breakers	22	8	6	8	35	34	+1	30	
6	Chicago Red Stars	22	8	6	8	32	36	−4	30	
7	Seattle Reign FC	22	5	3	14	22	36	−14	18	
8	Washington Spirit	22	3	5	14	16	39	−23	14	

Source: soccerway.com
Rules for classification: Tiebreakers
(C) Champions

==== Statistics ====
Field player regular-season statistics
N	P	Nation	Name	GP	GS	Min	G	A	WG	Shot	SOG	Cros	CK	Off	Foul	FS	YC	RC
6	MF	(United States) USA	Jen Buczkowski	22	22	1,980 (Note: Played every available minute of the season.)	0	2	0	11	11	0	0	1	11	14	0	0
13	DF	(United States) USA	Leigh Ann Robinson	22	22	1,900	0	5	0	10	6	16	0	2	5	5	1	0
11	MF	(Canada) CAN	Desiree Scott	20	20	1,800	0	0	0	7	5	2	0	0	24	12	0	0
19	MF	(United States) USA	Kristie Mewis	20	20	1,784	1	0	1	34	13	10	43	1	12	19	2	0
9	DF	(United States) USA	Merritt Mathias	22	19	1,738	2	3	0	25	17	19	4	7	22	13	3	0
4	DF	(United States) USA	Becky Sauerbrunn	19	19	1,710	0	1	0	2	1	1	0	0	2	5	0	0
14	DF	(Canada) CAN	Lauren Sesselmann	19	19	1,633	0	0	0	4	1	3	0	0	17	10	3	1
12	MF	(United States) USA	Lauren Cheney	18	18	1,620	12	9	3	63	31	9	27	3	14	28	0	0
15	MF	(United States) USA	Erika Tymrak	21	16	1,453	6	4	1	26	14	6	3	5	2	18	0	0
2	MF	(United States) USA	Melissa Henderson	17	13	1,030	0	0	0	12	9	2	0	16	11	9	0	0
17	MF	(United States) USA	Sinead Farrelly	16	10	896	1	0	1	9	3	0	0	6	4	7	0	0
10	FW	(Mexico) MEX	Renae Cuéllar	11	8	682	5	0	2	27	16	0	0	18	3	8	0	0
8	DF	(United States) USA	Courtney Jones	22	6	670	4	1	1	32	21	6	0	12	6	7	0	0
7	MF	(United States) USA	Casey Loyd	4	3	275	1	1	1	9	4	2	5	1	2	4	0	0
20	DF	(Canada) CAN	Katie Kelly	7	2	207	0	0	0	2	1	0	0	0	2	1	0	0
16	DF	(United States) USA	Nia Williams	4	2	182	0	0	0	0	0	0	0	0	3	1	1	0
10	MF	(Mexico) MEX	Teresa Noyola	7	1	155	0	0	0	3	0	1	0	0	2	1	0	0
16	FW	(United States) USA	Jaime French	1	0	11	0	0	0	0	0	0	0	0	0	0	0	0
3	FW	(Canada) CAN	Tiffany Cameron	1	0	4	0	0	0	0	0	0	0	0	0	0	0	0
22	MF	(United States) USA	Missy Geha	1	0	1	0	0	0	0	0	0	0	0	0	0	0	0
23	DF	(United States) USA	Natalie Norris	1	0	1	0	0	0	0	0	0	0	0	0	0	0	0

Goalkeeper regular-season statistics
N	P	Nation	Name	GP	GS	Min	W	L	T	Shot	SOG	Save	GA	GA/G	Pen	PKF	SO
18	GK	(United States) USA	Nicole Barnhart	20	20	1,800	10	5	5	187	86	67	19	0.95	3	3	10
1	GK	(United States) USA	Bianca Henninger	2	2	180	1	1	0	17	8	5	3	1.50	1	1	1

=== NWSL Championship Playoffs ===
August 24, 2013 Semifinal	FC Kansas City	2–3 (a.e.t.)	Portland Thorns FC	Overland Park, Kansas
13:00 CDT	Tymrak 12'; Henderson 25'; Scott (yellow card) 73'; Buczkowski (yellow card) 86'		Heath 33'; Dougherty (yellow card) 50'; Long (yellow card) 61' (goal) 103'; Weimer 66'	Stadium: Shawnee Mission District Stadium; Attendance: 4,016; Referee: Christina Unkel

== Honors and awards ==
- Lauren Holiday – NWSL Player of the Month, June 2013
- Erika Tymrak – NWSL Player of the Week, week 15
- Erika Tymrak – NWSL Player of the Month, July 2013
- Lauren Holiday – NWSL Golden Boot
- Erika Tymrak – NWSL Rookie of the Year
- Nicole Barnhart – NWSL Goalkeeper of the Year
- Becky Sauerbrunn – NWSL Defender of the Year
- Vlatko Andonovski – NWSL Coach of the Year
- Lauren Holiday – NWSL Most Valuable Player
- NWSL Team of the Year
  - First XI – GK Nicole Barnhart, DF Leigh Ann Robinson, DF Becky Sauerbrunn, MF Lauren Holiday
  - Second XI – DF Lauren Sesselmann, MF Desiree Scott, MF Erika Tymrak
