= List of Utah Royals players =

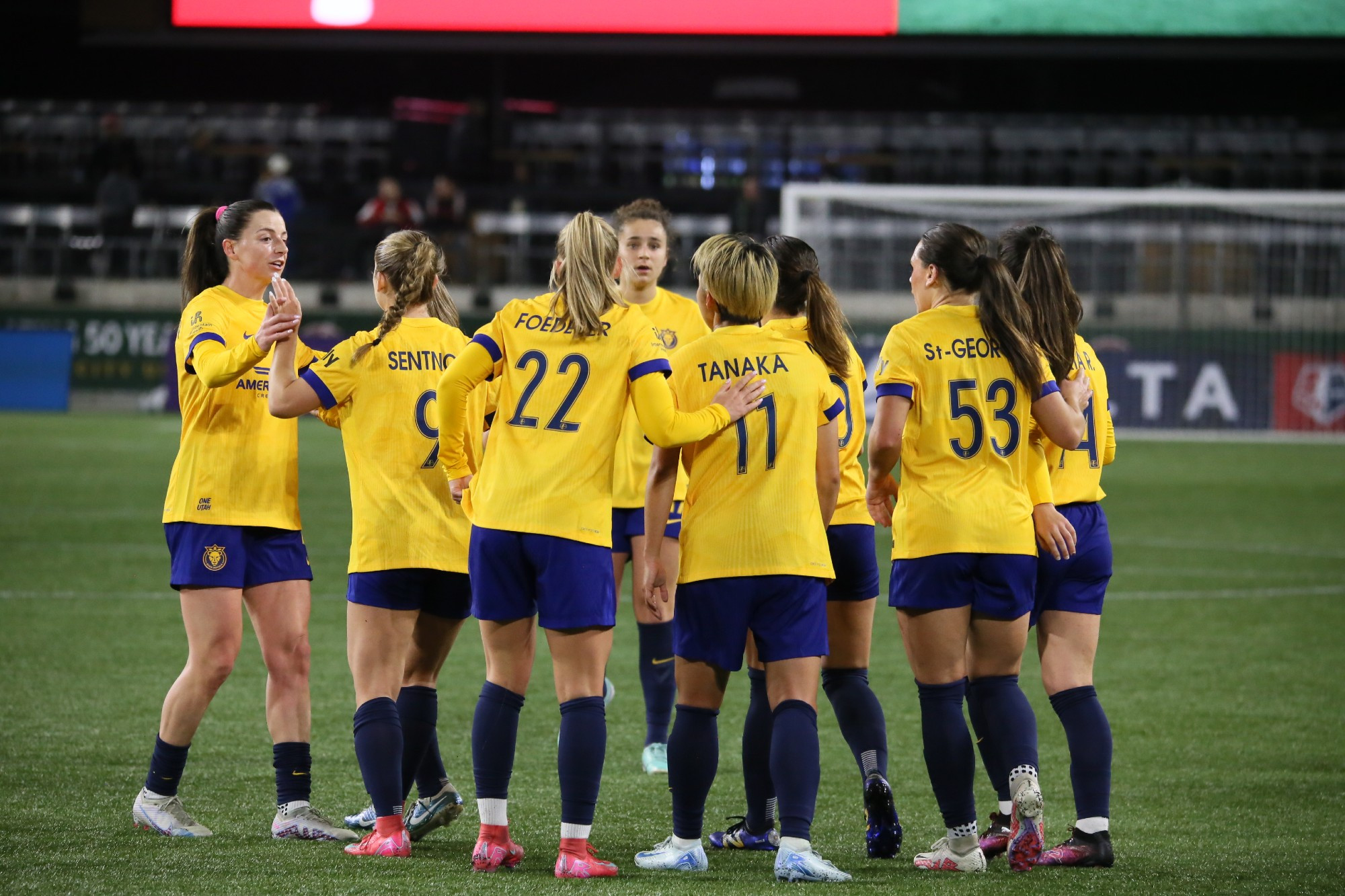
Utah Royals players in a preseason match against the Portland Thorns on March 7, 2025.

The Utah Royals (also known as Utah Royals FC) is an American professional women's soccer club. The first iteration of the Royals played in the National Women's Soccer League (NWSL) during its 2018 and 2019 seasons, and in the 2020 NWSL Challenge Cup and NWSL Fall Series. Its initial roster was relocated from FC Kansas City, which dissolved in 2017.

In December 2020, Utah Royals FC was dissolved, and its player contracts and franchise rights were transferred to a new team provisionally named Kansas City NWSL and later renamed Kansas City Current. The NWSL went three seasons without the Utah Royals before the club, under new ownership, re-entered the NWSL in 2024 as an expansion team.

All Royals players who have appeared for the team in an official competition are listed below. This includes members of the 2018–2020 and 2024–present versions of the club.

== Key ==
- The list is ordered alphabetically.
- Appearances as a substitute are included.
- Statistics are correct as of November 22, 2025, the end of the 2025 National Women's Soccer League season, and are updated once a year after the conclusion of the NWSL season.
- Players whose names are highlighted in **bold** were active players on the Royals roster as of the list's most recent update.

Positions key
GK	Goalkeeper
DF	Defender
MF	Midfielder
FW	Forward

Nationality
Unless otherwise noted, the nationality of a player is determined by the country they most recently represented in international play, or if said player has not played international football then by their country of birth.
Position
Playing positions are listed according to the player's roster designation as of the list's most recent update.
Years
Years are defined as the first and last calendar years in which the player was rostered for the club in any of the competitions listed below.
Appearances and goals
This list counts appearances and goals in the NWSL, NWSL playoffs, NWSL Challenge Cup, NWSL Fall Series, and NWSL x Liga MX Femenil Summer Cup.

== Players ==
Yrs	No.	Pos	Nat	Player	Total		NWSL		Playoffs		Cup (Note: Includes the NWSL Challenge Cup)		Other (Note: Includes the NWSL Fall Series and the NWSL x Liga MX Femenil Summer Cup)	
Yrs	No.	Pos	Nat	Player	Apps	Goals	Apps	Goals	Apps	Goals	Apps	Goals	Apps	Goals
2020	7	DF	(United States) USA	Elizabeth Ball	18	0	9	0	0	0	5	0	4	0
2018–2020	18	GK	(United States) USA	Nicole Barnhart (Note: Player acquired upon the club's formation via roster and rights transfer from FC Kansas City's dissolution.)	33	0	32	0	0	0	1	0	0	0
2024	33	FW	(United States) USA	Hannah Betfort	27	4	24	2	0	0	0	0	3	2
2019–2020	21	FW	(Spain) ESP	Verónica Boquete	29	1	21	0	0	0	5	1	3	0
2024	2	MF	(United States) USA	Ellie Boren	2	0	0	0	0	0	0	0	2	0
2024–2025	6	DF	(New Zealand) NZL	Katie Bowen	47	0	38	0	0	0	5	0	4	0
2018–2020	12	DF	(Canada) CAN	Zoe Burns	24	0	21	0	0	0	0	0	3	0
2019	21	MF	(United States) USA	Mikayla Cluff	11	0	11	0	0	0	0	0	0	0
2018–2020	2	DF	(Scotland) SCO	Rachel Corsie	48	1	43	1	0	0	5	0	0	0
2019	46	DF	(United States) USA	Meghan Cox	2	0	2	0	0	0	0	0	0	0
2020, 2024–	29, 8	DF	(United States) USA	Kate Del Fava	61	2	52	2	0	0	4	0	5	0
2020	38	MF	(France) FRA	Aminata Diallo	7	1	0	0	0	0	3	0	4	1
2018–2019	13	FW	(United States) USA	Makenzy Doniak	11	1	11	1	0	0	0	0	0	0
2024–2025	28	DF	(United States) USA	Imani Dorsey	19	0	19	0	0	0	0	0	0	0
2018	33	MF	(United States) USA	Brooke Elby	7	0	7	0	0	0	0	0	0	0
2024–	5	DF	(United States) USA	Lauren Flynn	21	0	21	0	0	0	0	0	0	0
2024–2025	22	MF	(Netherlands) NED	Dana Foederer	50	1	47	1	0	0	0	0	3	0
2024–2025	14	MF	(New Zealand) NZL	Macey Fraser	9	0	9	0	0	0	0	0	0	0
2018	19	MF	(Australia) AUS	Katrina Gorry	16	0	16	0	0	0	0	0	0	0
2024–	24	MF	(United States) USA	Emily Gray	2	0	2	0	0	0	0	0	0	0
2024–2025	3	DF	(United States) USA	Olivia Griffitts	15	1	13	1	0	0	0	0	2	0
2025	15	DF	(Colombia) COL	Ana María Guzmán	5	0	5	0	0	0	0	0	0	0
2024	10	MF	(France) FRA	Amandine Henry	10	0	10	0	0	0	0	0	0	0
2018	16	DF	(United States) USA	Samantha Johnson	6	0	6	0	0	0	0	0	0	0
2025	34	DF	(United States) USA	Sydney Jones	1	0	1	0	0	0	0	0	0	0
2025–	23	GK	(United States) USA	Mia Justus	2	0	2	0	0	0	0	0	0	0
2020	3	FW	(United States) USA	Tziarra King	8	2	0	0	0	0	4	1	4	1
2025–	25	FW	(United States) USA	Cece Kizer	10	1	10	1	0	0	0	0	0	0
2018–2020	9	MF	(United States) USA	Lo'eau LaBonta	47	2	38	2	0	0	5	0	4	0
2024–	24	FW	(Canada) CAN	Cloé Lacasse	21	5	21	5	0	0	0	0	0	0
2018–2019	7	MF	(United States) USA	Mandy Laddish	11	0	11	0	0	0	0	0	0	0
2020	24	DF	(United States) USA	Taylor Leach	4	0	0	0	0	0	2	0	2	0
2025–	12	MF	(United States) USA	Alex Loera	1	0	1	0	0	0	0	0	0	0
2019–2020	61	GK	(United States) USA	Melissa Lowder	1	0	0	0	0	0	0	0	1	0
2018–2020	12	MF	(United States) USA	Taylor Lytle (Note: Taylor Lytle and Kelley O'Hara were the Royals' first acquisitions not to be from the FC Kansas City roster distribution, via trade with Sky Blue FC on April 13, 2018, in exchange for the player rights to Christina Gibbons and Shea Groom, and the fourth-overall pick in the 2018 NWSL College Draft.)	15	0	10	0	0	0	2	0	3	0
2019–2020	19	DF	(United States) USA	Michelle Maemone	11	0	7	0	0	0	3	0	1	0
2018–2020	10	MF	(Canada) CAN	Diana Matheson	25	3	21	2	0	0	4	1	0	0
2024–	1	GK	(United States) USA	Mandy McGlynn	49	0	48	0	0	0	0	0	1	0
2024	13	DF	(United States) USA	Addisyn Merrick	7	0	4	0	0	0	0	0	3	0
2018–2019	17	DF	(United States) USA	Sydney Miramontez	14	0	14	0	0	0	0	0	0	0
2024–	4	FW	(United States) USA	Paige Monaghan	41	8	38	7	0	0	0	0	3	1
2018–2019	3	DF	(United States) USA	Becca Moros	30	0	30	0	0	0	0	0	0	0
2024–	15, 13	FW	(United States) USA	Brecken Mozingo	44	5	41	3	0	0	0	0	3	2
2024	35	FW	(United States) USA	Shaelan Murison	5	0	3	0	0	0	0	0	2	0
2025–	33	MF	(United States) USA	Aria Nagai	11	0	11	0	0	0	0	0	0	0
2024	27	GK	(United States) USA	Carly Nelson	1	0	1	0	0	0	0	0	0	0
2018, 2019	48	MF	(United States) USA	Alexa Newfield	2	0	2	0	0	0	0	0	0	0
2019–2020	22	DF	(United States) USA	Maddie Nolf	3	0	0	0	0	0	3	0	0	0
2024	6	MF	(Sweden) SWE	Agnes Nyberg	12	0	11	0	0	0	0	0	1	0
2024	23	DF	(United States) USA	Darielle O'Brien	1	0	0	0	0	0	0	0	1	0
2018–2020	5	DF	(United States) USA	Kelley O'Hara	14	1	12	1	0	0	2	0	0	0
2024	11	FW	(Nigeria) NGA	Ifeoma Onumonu	5	0	5	0	0	0	0	0	0	0
2024–2025	16	DF	(United States) USA	Madison Pogarch	46	0	43	0	0	0	0	0	3	0
2025–	9	FW	(Slovenia) SVN	Lara Prašnikar	5	0	5	0	0	0	0	0	0	0
2018–2019	21, 23	FW	(United States) USA	Christen Press	25	10	25	10	0	0	0	0	0	0
2025–	14	DF	(Spain) ESP	Nuria Rábano	22	0	22	0	0	0	0	0	0	0
2018–2020	25	FW	(United States) USA	Brittany Ratcliffe	19	2	10	2	0	0	5	0	4	0
2025–	19	FW	(United States) USA	KK Ream	9	1	9	1	0	0	0	0	0	0
2024–	18	DF	(United States) USA	Kaleigh Riehl	29	1	26	1	0	0	0	0	3	0
2018–2020	8	FW	(United States) USA	Amy Rodriguez	51	16	43	14	0	0	4	1	4	1
2024–2025	32	GK	(Puerto Rico) PUR	Cristina Roque	3	0	1	0	0	0	0	0	2	0
2018–2019	4	DF	(United States) USA	Becky Sauerbrunn	34	1	34	1	0	0	0	0	0	0
2018–2020	11	MF	(Canada) CAN	Desiree Scott	38	0	38	0	0	0	0	0	0	0
2024–2025	9	FW	(United States) USA	Ally Sentnor	36	6	34	4	0	0	0	0	2	2
2020	17	FW	(United States) USA	Arielle Ship	5	0	0	0	0	0	2	0	3	0
2018–2020	1	GK	(United States) USA	Abby Smith	24	0	17	0	0	0	4	0	3	0
2025	30	FW	(Guatemala) GUA	Aisha Solórzano	20	1	20	1	0	0	0	0	0	0
2025	53	FW	(Canada) CAN	Bianca St-Georges	22	3	22	3	0	0	0	0	0	0
2018–2019	24	FW	(United States) USA	Katie Stengel	47	8	47	8	0	0	0	0	0	0
2019–2020	42	FW	(United States) USA	Raisa Strom-Okimoto	8	0	3	0	0	0	3	0	2	0
2024	19	MF	(United States) USA	Frankie Tagliaferri	6	0	6	0	0	0	0	0	0	0
2024–	29, 11	FW	(Japan) JPN	Mina Tanaka	30	7	30	7	0	0	0	0	0	0
2024–	17	DF	(Spain) ESP	Ana Tejada	41	2	38	2	0	0	0	0	3	0
2025–	7	DF	(Denmark) DEN	Janni Thomsen	26	3	26	3	0	0	0	0	0	0
2018	20	FW	(Norway) NOR	Elise Thorsnes	9	0	9	0	0	0	0	0	0	0
2024	20	FW	(United States) USA	Cameron Tucker	19	2	18	1	0	0	0	0	1	1
2018–2019	15	MF	(United States) USA	Erika Tymrak	30	1	30	1	0	0	0	0	0	0
2020–2024	15, 7	FW	(United States) USA	Michele Vasconcelos	17	1	14	0	0	0	0	0	3	1
2019–2020	14	DF	(United States) USA	Gaby Vincent	11	0	9	0	0	0	0	0	2	0
2019–2020	20	FW	(United States) USA	Mallory Weber	26	0	18	0	0	0	4	0	4	0
2018–2020	23, 66	MF	(Iceland) ISL	Gunnhildur Yrsa Jónsdóttir (Note: Icelandic player Gunnhildur Yrsa Jónsdóttir was the Royals' first international signing, acquired on January 3, 2018. Jónsdóttir would also score the club's first-ever goal, three minutes into the club's season opener against Orlando Pride on March 24, 2018.)	52	2	48	2	0	0	4	0	0	0
2024–2025	26, 10	MF	(Spain) ESP	Claudia Zornoza	34	3	34	3	0	0	0	0	0	0

== By nationality ==
In total, 82 players representing 18 different countries have appeared for the Utah Royals.

Note: Countries indicate national team as defined under FIFA eligibility rules. Players may hold more than one non-FIFA nationality.

Country	Total players
Australia	1
Canada	5
Colombia	1
Denmark	1
France	2
Guatemala	1
Iceland	1
Japan	1
Netherlands	1
Nigeria	1
Norway	1
New Zealand	2
Puerto Rico	1
Scotland	1
Slovenia	1
Spain	4
Sweden	1
United States	56

== See also ==
- List of FC Kansas City players
- List of Kansas City Current players
- List of top-division football clubs in CONCACAF countries
- List of professional sports teams in the United States and Canada
