= 2021 Kansas City NWSL season =

Kansas City NWSL's first season

Kansas City NWSL
2021 season
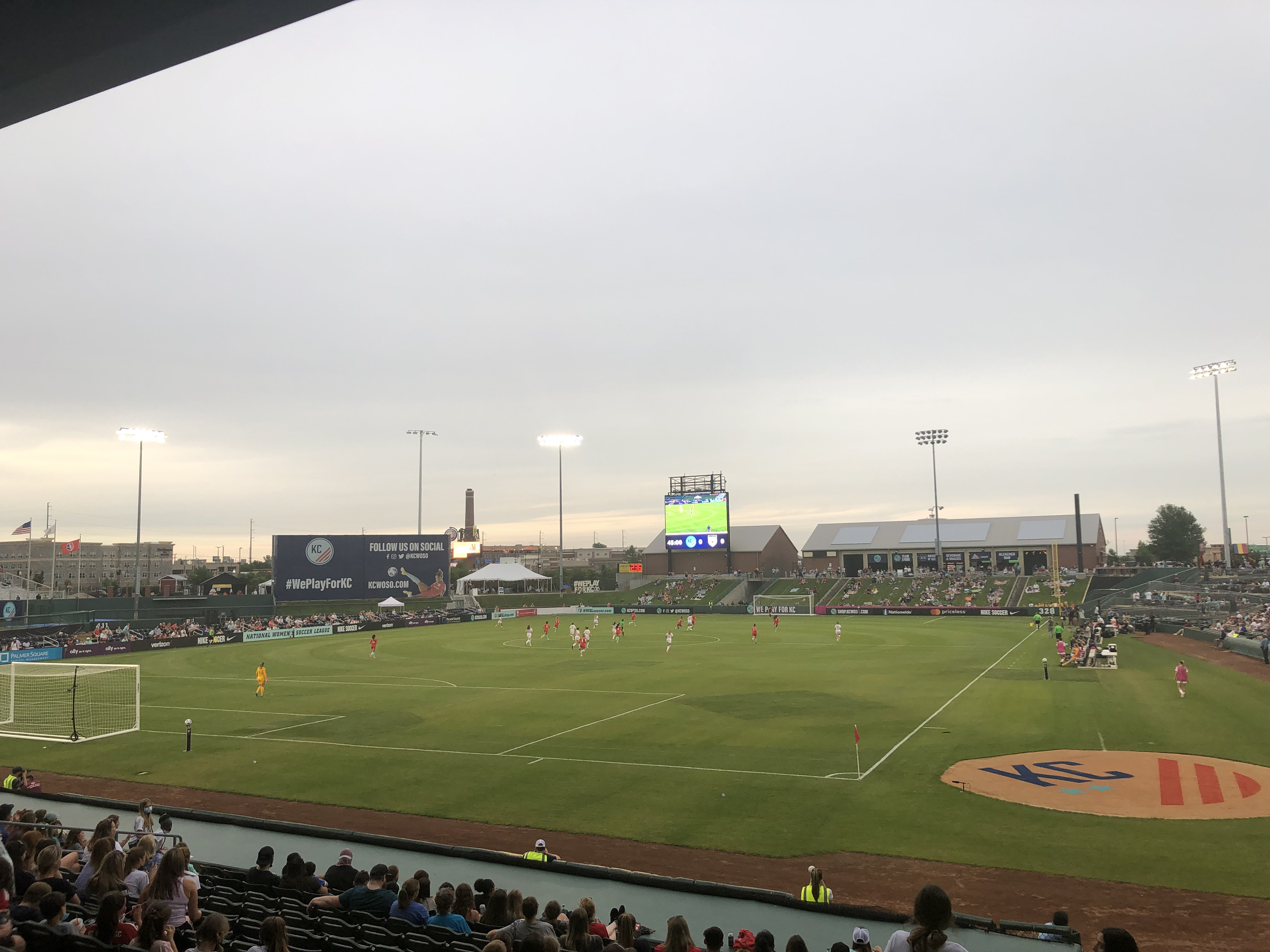
- Kansas City NWSL's 2021 home opener on May 26, 2021, at Legends Field in Kansas City, Kansas.
- Owners: Angie Long; Chris Long; Brittany Mahomes
- General manager: Camille Levin Ashton
- Head coach: Huw Williams
- Stadium: Legends Field (capacity: 10,385)
- 2021: 10th
- 2021 NWSL Challenge Cup: 5th, West Division
- Top goalscorer: League: Darian Jenkins (3); All: Amy Rodriguez (4)
- Highest home attendance: 6,345 (Oct. 30 vs. RGN)
- Lowest home attendance: 3,449 (Oct. 13 vs. HOU)
- Average home league attendance: 4,861
- Biggest win: 3–0 (Oct. 13 vs. HOU)
- Biggest defeat: 0–4 (Aug. 21 at NC)
Home colors	Away colors
- All statistics correct as of July 20, 2022.

The 2021 Kansas City NWSL season was the team's first season as a professional women's soccer team. Kansas City NWSL plays in the National Women's Soccer League, the top tier of women's soccer in the United States. The team rebranded at halftime of its final match to the Kansas City Current.

== Background ==
Kansas City previously had an NWSL team in 2017, when two-time champions FC Kansas City ceased operations and its player-related assets were transferred to expansion team Utah Royals FC. Three years later, the Royals also had to cease operations, and a Kansas City-based ownership group led by financial executives Angie and Chris Long took advantage to secure an expansion team along with the Royals' player-related assets on December 7, 2020. Brittany Mahomes, wife of Kansas City Chiefs quarterback Patrick Mahomes and former college soccer player at University of Texas at Tyler, purchased a stake in the team as well.

== Stadium ==
The team began play at 10,385-capacity Legends Field, a baseball park in Kansas City, Kansas, that was home to the Kansas City Monarchs of the American Association of Professional Baseball. However, the team moved its inaugural home match, scheduled for April 26, to Children's Mercy Park due to delays in construction at Legends Field.

== Team ==
=== Staff ===
Upon forming Kansas City NWSL, the Longs immediately named Huw Williams, former general manager of FC Kansas City, as the team's inaugural head coach. The team subsequently named the rest of its staff on January 11, 2021.

As of January 11, 2021.

Technical
General manager	Derek Shoare
Head coach	Huw Williams
Assistant coaches	Natalia Astrain; Goran Karadjov; Lucas Rodriguez
Goalkeeper coach	Alli Lipsher
Sports Science and Medical
Sports performance coach	Terrence Kennell
Athletic trainer	Bailey Torrez
Medical director	Kirk McCullough
Team doctor	Meg Gibson
Team Operations
Equipment manager	Karly Cebula
Team administrator	Jessica Buller

=== Squad ===
Upon formation, the NWSL awarded Kansas City NWSL with the player rights, draft picks, and other roster-related assets of the defunct Utah Royals FC, which formed the team's inaugural roster.

As of November 4, 2021.

No.	Pos.	Nation	Player
0	GK	USA	Katelyn Rowland
1	GK	USA	Adrianna Franch
2	DF	SCO	Rachel Corsie
4	FW	USA	Hailie Mace
5	DF	USA	Sydney Miramontez
6	DF	SCO	Katie Bowen
7	DF	USA	Elizabeth Ball
9	MF	USA	Lo'eau LaBonta
11	MF	CAN	Desiree Scott
13	FW	USA	Darian Jenkins
14	MF	USA	Gaby Vincent
16	FW	USA	Jaycie Johnson
17	FW	USA	Arielle Ship
19	DF	USA	Michelle Maemone
20	DF	USA	Mallory Weber
21	FW	ARG	Mariana Larroquette
22	MF	USA	Maddie Nolf
23	DF	USA	Kiki Pickett
24	DF	USA	Taylor Leach
25	FW	USA	Kristen Hamilton
26	MF	CAN	Jordyn Listro
28	MF	USA	Addie McCain
29	DF	USA	Kate Del Fava
66	MF	AUS	Chloe Logarzo
77	FW	POR	Jéssica Silva
99	MF	CAN	Victoria Pickett

== Competitions ==
=== Challenge Cup ===
==== Group stage ====
April 9, 2021 1	Portland Thorns FC	2–1	Kansas City NWSL	Portland, Oregon
19:30 PDT	Rodríguez 8' (Klingenberg); Charley (yellow card) 49' (yellow-red card) 90'; Parsons (yellow card) 90' (red card); Lussi 58' (Westphal); Weaver (yellow card) 90+4' (red card)	Report	Pickett (yellow card) 48'; Rodriguez (yellow card) 70', (goal) 80' (Pickett); Del Fava (yellow card) 90+1'; Edmonds (yellow card) 90+4' (red card)	Stadium: Providence Park; Attendance: 4,646; Referee: Danielle Chesky; Assistant referees: Deleana Quan, Kali Smith; Fourth official: Adorae Monroy

April 21, 2021 2	Chicago Red Stars	1–1	Kansas City NWSL	Bridgeview, Illinois
17:30 CDT	Colaprico (yellow card) 25'; Ertz (yellow card) 66'; Johnson 82' (Wright)	Report	Rodriguez 80' (Smith)	Stadium: SeatGeek Stadium; Referee: Natalie Simon; Assistant referees: Jennifer Garner, Rachel Smith; Fourth official: Calin Radosav

April 26, 2021 3	Kansas City NWSL	0–3	Houston Dash	Kansas City, Kansas
19:30 CDT	Miramontez (yellow card) 29'; Corsie (yellow card) 40'; Del Fava (yellow card) 54'	Report	Mewis 25', 71' (Prince); Campbell (yellow card) 34'; Daly 45+1' (pen.); Visalli (yellow card) 58'	Stadium: Children's Mercy Park; Attendance: 4,669; Referee: Alyssa Nichols; Assistant referees: Tiffini Turpin, Melissa Gonzalez; Fourth official: Luis Tribaldo

May 3, 2021 4	Kansas City NWSL	1–2	OL Reign	Kansas City, Kansas
19:00 CDT	Weber 6' (Pickett)	Report	Fishlock 34', (yellow card) 59'; King (yellow card) 35'; Pruitt (yellow card) 79'; Celia 84' (Barnes)	Stadium: Legends Field; Attendance: 3,079; Referee: Karen Callado; Assistant referees: Kali Smith, Jack Ryan-Feldman; Fourth official: Velimir Stefanovic

==== West Division standings ====
Pos	Team	Pld	W	D	L	GF	GA	GD	Pts	Qualification
1	Portland Thorns FC	4	3	1	0	6	2	+4	10	Qualification for the Championship
2	OL Reign	4	2	1	1	5	5	0	7	
3	Houston Dash	4	1	3	0	4	2	+2	6	
4	Chicago Red Stars	4	0	2	2	3	5	−2	2	
5	Kansas City	4	0	1	3	4	8	−4	1	

Source: NWSL
Rules for classification: Tiebreakers

=== Regular season ===
==== Matches ====
May 15, 2021 1	Racing Louisville FC	0–0	Kansas City NWSL	Louisville, Kentucky
17:00 EDT	McCaskill (yellow card) 53'	Report		Stadium: Lynn Family Stadium; Attendance: 6,622

May 23, 2021 2	Houston Dash	2–2	Kansas City NWSL	Houston, Texas
18:00 CDT	Schmidt (yellow card) 57'; Daly 60' (Chapman); Groom 66' (Mewis)	Report	Rodriguez 13' (Mallory Weber); Ball (yellow card) 53'; Leach 90+2' (Larroquette)	Stadium: BBVA Stadium; Attendance: 3,034

May 26, 2021 3	Kansas City NWSL	0–2	Chicago Red Stars	Kansas City, Kansas
19:00 CDT	Weber (yellow card) 82'	Report	Johnson (yellow card) 42'; Gautrat (yellow card) 66'; Watt 67' (Pugh); Doniak 70' (Pugh); Naeher (yellow card) 89'	Stadium: Legends Field; Attendance: 5,272

May 30, 2021 4	Orlando Pride	1–0	Kansas City NWSL	Orlando, Florida
18:00 EDT	Morgan 16' (Petersen); Jónsdóttir (yellow card) 36'	Report	McCain (yellow card) 37'; Weber (yellow card) 45'; Larroquette (yellow card) 62'	Stadium: Exploria Stadium; Attendance: 4,044

June 6, 2021 5	Kansas City NWSL	0–1	Houston Dash	Kansas City, Kansas
13:00 CDT	Smith (yellow card) 27'	Report	Prisock (yellow card) 18'; Groom (yellow card) 27'; Seiler (yellow card) 40'; Mewis (yellow card) 52'; Naughton 79' (Mewis); Montefusco (yellow card) 89'	Stadium: Legends Field; Attendance: 4,265

June 20, 2021 6	Portland Thorns FC	1–0	Kansas City NWSL	Portland, Oregon
13:00 PDT	Charley 45+5' (Dunn)	Report	Ball (yellow card) 12'; Edmonds (yellow card) 37'; Pickett (yellow card) 84'	Stadium: Providence Park

June 23, 2021 7	Kansas City NWSL	1–3	Orlando Pride	Kansas City, Kansas
13:00 CDT	Larroquette 45+8' (Silva)	Report	Tymrak (yellow card) 45+6'; Dougherty Howard (yellow card) 45+8'; Leroux 45+10' (Washington), 49' (Jónsdóttir); Marta 85' (Jónsdóttir)	Stadium: Legends Field; Attendance: 4,197

June 26, 2021 8	Kansas City NWSL	1–2	Washington Spirit	Kansas City, Kansas
19:30 CDT	Rodriguez 3' (Silva); LaBonta (yellow card) 33'; Edmonds (yellow card) 56'; Jenkins (yellow card) 73'	Report	Sanchez 78' (Rodman); Rodman 90+5' (Huster)	Stadium: Legends Field; Attendance: 5,157

July 2, 2021 9	NJ/NY Gotham FC	1–1	Kansas City NWSL	Harrison, New Jersey
22:20 EDT	Onumonu 31' (Kawasumi); Long (yellow card) 45+1'	Report	Larroquette 83'	Stadium: Red Bull Arena; Attendance: 2,307

July 11, 2021 10	OL Reign	2–0	Kansas City NWSL	Tacoma, Washington
16:00 PDT	Balcer 3', 29' (Huerta); Barnes (yellow card) 45+1'; Bouhaddi (yellow card) 70' (red card); Marozsán (yellow card) 79'; Le Sommer (yellow card) 90+2'	Report	Weber (yellow card) 49'	Stadium: Cheney Stadium; Attendance: 3,124

July 23, 2021 11	Kansas City NWSL	0–0	North Carolina Courage	Kansas City, Kansas
19:00 CDT		Report	Rodriguez (yellow card) 55'; Speck (yellow card) 75'	Stadium: Legends Field; Attendance: 5,239

August 1, 2021 12	Portland Thorns FC	2–0	Kansas City NWSL	Portland, Oregon
12:00 PDT	Edmonds 10' (o.g.); Everett 42' (Smith); Moultrie (yellow card) 87'	Report		Stadium: Providence Park; Attendance: 16,246

August 8, 2021 13	Racing Louisville FC	3–1	Kansas City NWSL	Louisville, Kentucky
14:00 EDT	Nadim (yellow card) 21', (goal) 55' (McCaskill); Fox (yellow card) 35'; McCaskill (yellow card) 38'; Salmon 43' (McCaskill); Matthews 86', (yellow card) 90'	Report	Pickett (yellow card) 45+1'; Jenkins 45+9'; LaBonta (yellow card) 63'; Silva (yellow card) 82'	Stadium: Lynn Family Stadium; Attendance: 5,843

August 14, 2021 14	Kansas City NWSL	1–0	OL Reign	Kansas City, Kansas
19:00 CDT	K. Pickett (yellow card) 27'; V. Pickett 73'	Report	Cook (yellow card) 45+2'	Stadium: Legends Field; Attendance: 5,368

August 21, 2021 15	North Carolina Courage	4–0	Kansas City NWSL	Cary, North Carolina
19:00 EDT	Williams 12' (Pickett); McDonald 21' (Pickett); Solaun (yellow card) 40' (yellow-red card) 75'; Rodriguez 64' (Williams); Speck 90' (Smith)	Report	McCain (yellow card) 44'; Pickett (yellow card) 47'	Stadium: WakeMed Soccer Park; Attendance: 4,943

August 25, 2021 16	Kansas City NWSL	2–1	Racing Louisville FC	Kansas City, Kansas
19:00 CDT	Ball (yellow card) 10'; Simon 17' (o.g.); Hamilton 40' (Mace); LaBonta (yellow card) 45+2'; Weber (yellow card) 50'; Vincent (yellow card) 79'	Report	Nadim (yellow card) 27'; Kizer 65' (Nadim); Miramontez (yellow card) 88' (yellow-red card) 90+2'	Stadium: Legends Field; Attendance: 3,997

August 28, 2021 17	Chicago Red Stars	3–0	Kansas City NWSL	Bridgeview, Illinois
19:00 CDT	Woldmoe 36' (Pugh), 62', (yellow card) 89'; Johnson 81' (Watt)	Report		Stadium: SeatGeek Stadium; Attendance: 3,536

September 5, 2021 18	Kansas City NWSL	0–0	North Carolina Courage	Kansas City, Kansas
18:00 CDT	Mace (yellow card) 20'	Report	Roccaro (yellow card) 26'	Stadium: Legends Field; Attendance: 4,583

September 26, 2021 19	Washington Spirit	2–1	Kansas City NWSL	Leesburg, Virginia
17:00 EDT	Sullivan 45+3'; McKeown 46'; Sanchez (yellow card) 53'; Rodman (yellow card) 84'; Huster (yellow card) 90'	Report	Jenkins 8' (LaBonta); Pickett (yellow card) 45+2'; Hamilton (yellow card) 45+2'	Stadium: Segra Field; Attendance: 3,295

October 10, 2021 20	Kansas City NWSL	0–0	Portland Thorns FC	Kansas City, Kansas
16:00 CDT		Report		Stadium: Legends Field; Attendance: 5,438

October 13, 2021 21	Kansas City NWSL	3–0	Houston Dash	Kansas City, Kansas
19:00 CDT	Jenkins 18'; Ball 36' (Bowen); Pickett (yellow card) 87'; LaBonta 90+2'	Report	Spencer (yellow card) 90+4'	Stadium: Legends Field; Attendance: 3,449

October 16, 2021 22	Chicago Red Stars	2–1	Kansas City NWSL	Bridgeview, Illinois
19:00 CDT	Edmonds 34' (o.g.); Doniak 50' (Watt)	Report	Mace 37' (Bowen); Ball (yellow card) 88'	Stadium: SeatGeek Stadium; Attendance: 4,488

October 22, 2021 23	Kansas City NWSL	1–1	NJ/NY Gotham FC	Kansas City, Kansas
19:00 CDT	Edmonds 45' (pen.); Addie McCain (yellow card) 53'	Report	Dydasco (yellow card) 22'; Purce 25' (Zerboni); Long (yellow card) 55'	Stadium: Legends Field; Attendance: 4,733

October 30, 2021 24	Kansas City Current	0–3	OL Reign	Kansas City, Kansas
19:00 CDT	LaBonta (yellow card) 44'	Report	Pickett 35' (o.g.); Le Sommer 49' (Lavelle), 64' (Rapinoe); Brooks (yellow card) 90+5'	Stadium: Legends Field; Attendance: 6,345
Note: Kansas City NWSL changed its name and crest at halftime to Kansas City Current.

==== Regular season standings ====
Pos	Team	Pld	W	D	L	GF	GA	GD	Pts	Qualification
1	Portland Thorns FC	24	13	5	6	33	17	+16	44	NWSL Shield
2	OL Reign	24	13	3	8	37	24	+13	42	Playoffs – Semi-finals
3	Washington Spirit (C)	24	11	6	7	29	26	+3	39	Playoffs – First round
4	Chicago Red Stars	24	11	5	8	28	28	0	38	Playoffs – First round
5	NJ/NY Gotham FC	24	8	11	5	29	21	+8	35	Playoffs – First round
6	North Carolina Courage	24	9	6	9	28	23	+5	33	Playoffs – First round
7	Houston Dash	24	9	5	10	31	31	0	32	
8	Orlando Pride	24	7	7	10	27	32	−5	28	
9	Racing Louisville FC	24	5	7	12	21	40	−19	22	
10	Kansas City	24	3	7	14	15	36	−21	16	

Source: NWSL
Rules for classification: Tiebreakers
(C) Champions

==== Results summary ====
Overall								Home						Away					
Pld	W	D	L	GF	GA	GD	Pts	W	D	L	GF	GA	GD	W	D	L	GF	GA	GD
24	3	7	14	15	36	−21	16	3	4	5	9	13	−4	0	3	9	6	23	−17

Last updated: October 30, 2021.
Source: NWSLsoccer.com

==== Results by matchday ====
Matchday	1	2	3	4	5	6	7	8	9	10	11	12	13	14	15	16	17	18	19	20	21	22	23	24
Stadium	A	A	H	A	H	A	H	H	A	A	H	A	A	H	A	H	A	H	A	H	H	A	H	H
Result	D	D	L	L	L	L	L	L	D	L	D	L	L	W	L	W	L	D	L	D	W	L	D	L
Position	2	6	8	10	10	10	10	10	10	10	10	10	10	10	10	10	10	10	10	10	10	10	10	10

Updated to match(es) played on October 30, 2021. Source: NWSL
A = Away; H = Home; W = Win; D = Draw; L = Loss

== Statistical leaders ==
As of October 30, 2021, for all competitions.

=== Top scorers ===
Rank	Nat.	Player	Goals
1	(United States)	Amy Rodriguez	4
2	(United States)	Darian Jenkins	3
3	(Argentina)	Mariana Larroquette	2
4	—	9 players	1

=== Top assists ===
Rank	Nat.	Player	Assists
1	(New Zealand)	Katie Bowen	2
1	(United States)	Lo'eau LaBonta	2
1	(Canada)	Victoria Pickett	2
1	(Portugal)	Jéssica Silva	2
5	(Argentina)	Mariana Larroquette	1
5	(United States)	Hailie Mace	1
5	(United States)	Abby Smith	1
5	(United States)	Mallory Weber	1

=== Shutouts ===
Rank	Nat.	Player	Clean sheets
1	(United States)	Adrianna Franch	3
2	(United States)	Nicole Barnhart	1
2	(United States)	Carly Nelson	1
2	(United States)	Abby Smith	1

== Awards ==
=== NWSL weekly awards ===
==== Player of the Week ====
Week	Nat.	Player	Won	Ref.
5	(United States)	Elyse Bennett	Won	

==== Save of the Week ====
Week	Nat.	Player	Won	Ref.
5	(United States)	Abby Smith	Won	
7	(United States)	Nicole Barnhart	Nom.	
8	(United States)	Nicole Barnhart	Nom.	
10	(United States)	Kristen Edmonds	Nom.	
14	(United States)	Katelyn Rowland	Nom.	
16	(United States)	Adrianna Franch	Nom.	
20	(United States)	Adrianna Franch	Nom.	
22	(United States)	Adrianna Franch	Nom.	

== Transactions ==
=== 2021 NWSL Draft ===
Draft picks are not automatically signed to the team roster. The 2021 NWSL Draft was held on January 13, 2021. The NWSL awarded Kansas City all of the defunct Utah Royals FC team's player rights and draft picks upon its dissolution.

Round	Pick	Nat.	Player	Pos.	College	Status	Ref.
1	4	(United States)	Kiki Pickett	DF	Stanford	Signed to three-year contract	
2	15	(Canada)	Victoria Pickett	MF	Wisconsin	Signed to three-year contract	
2	16	(England)	Lucy Parker	DF	UCLA	Not signed or named to preseason roster	
2	17	(United States)	Addie McCain	MF	Texas A&M	Signed to two-year contract	
4	36	(United States)	Alex Loera	MF	Santa Clara	Signed to two-year contract in 2022	
4	36	(United States)	Brookelynn Entz	MF	Kansas State	Not signed or named to preseason roster	

=== Transfers in ===
Date	Nat.	Player	Pos.	Previous club	Fee/notes	Ref.
December 22, 2020	(Argentina)	Mariana Larroquette	FW	(Norway) Lyn Fotball	Signed two-year contract; no fee disclosed.	
January 28, 2021	(Australia)	Chloe Logarzo	MF	(England) Bristol City W.F.C.	Signed two-year contract; no fee disclosed.	
March 30, 2021	(Canada)	Jordyn Listro	MF	(United States) Orlando Pride	Acquired in exchange for Kansas City's natural third-round pick in the 2022 NWSL Draft, or conditionally the team's second-round pick in the 2022 or 2023 NWSL Drafts.	
May 10, 2021	(Portugal)	Jéssica Silva	FW	(France) Olympique Lyonnais Féminin	Signed two-year contract.	
July 22, 2021	(United States)	Kristen Hamilton	FW	(United States) North Carolina Courage	Acquired in exchange for $60,000 in allocation money and Amy Rodriguez.	
July 22, 2021	(United States)	Hailie Mace	MF	(United States) North Carolina Courage	Acquired in exchange for $60,000 in allocation money and Amy Rodriguez.	
July 22, 2021	(United States)	Katelyn Rowland	GK	(United States) North Carolina Courage	Acquired in exchange for $60,000 in allocation money and Amy Rodriguez.	
August 18, 2021	(United States)	Adrianna Franch	GK	(United States) Portland Thorns FC	Acquired in exchange for $150,000 in allocation money and Abby Smith.	

=== Transfers out ===
Date	Nat.	Player	Pos.	Destination club	Fee/notes	Ref.
July 22, 2021	(United States)	Amy Rodriguez	FW	(United States) North Carolina Courage	Traded with $60,000 in allocation money in exchange for Kristen Hamilton, Hailie Mace, and Katelyn Rowland.	
August 18, 2021	(United States)	Abby Smith	GK	(United States) Portland Thorns FC	Traded with $150,000 in allocation money in exchange for Adrianna Franch.	
August 24, 2021	(United States)	Carly Nelson	GK	(Denmark) FC Nordsjælland	Loaned for duration of FC Nordsjælland's season.	
September 1, 2021	(United States)	Michele Vasconcelos	FW	(Spain) Sevilla FC	On loan until June 2022.	
December 20, 2021	(United States)	Gaby Vincent	DF/MF	(United States) Washington Spirit	Traded in exchange for $25,000 in allocation money and Washington's natural fourth-round selection in the 2023 NWSL Draft.	
December 21, 2021	(Argentina)	Mariana Larroquette	FW	—	Bought out of the remainder of her contract.	
December 21, 2021	(Scotland)	Katie Bowen	DF	—	Waived.	
December 21, 2021	(United States)	Michelle Maemone	DF	—	Waived.	
January 11, 2022	(United States)	Darian Jenkins	FW	(United States) Orlando Pride	Traded in exchange for $75,000 in allocation money and Orlando's natural second-round pick in the 2023 NWSL Draft.	
January 21, 2022	(Portugal)	Jéssica Silva	FW	(Portugal) S.L. Benfica	Transferred for undisclosed terms.	
January 27, 2022	(Scotland)	Rachel Corsie	DF	(England) Aston Villa W.F.C.	Transferred for undisclosed terms.	
