= List of Kansas City Current players =

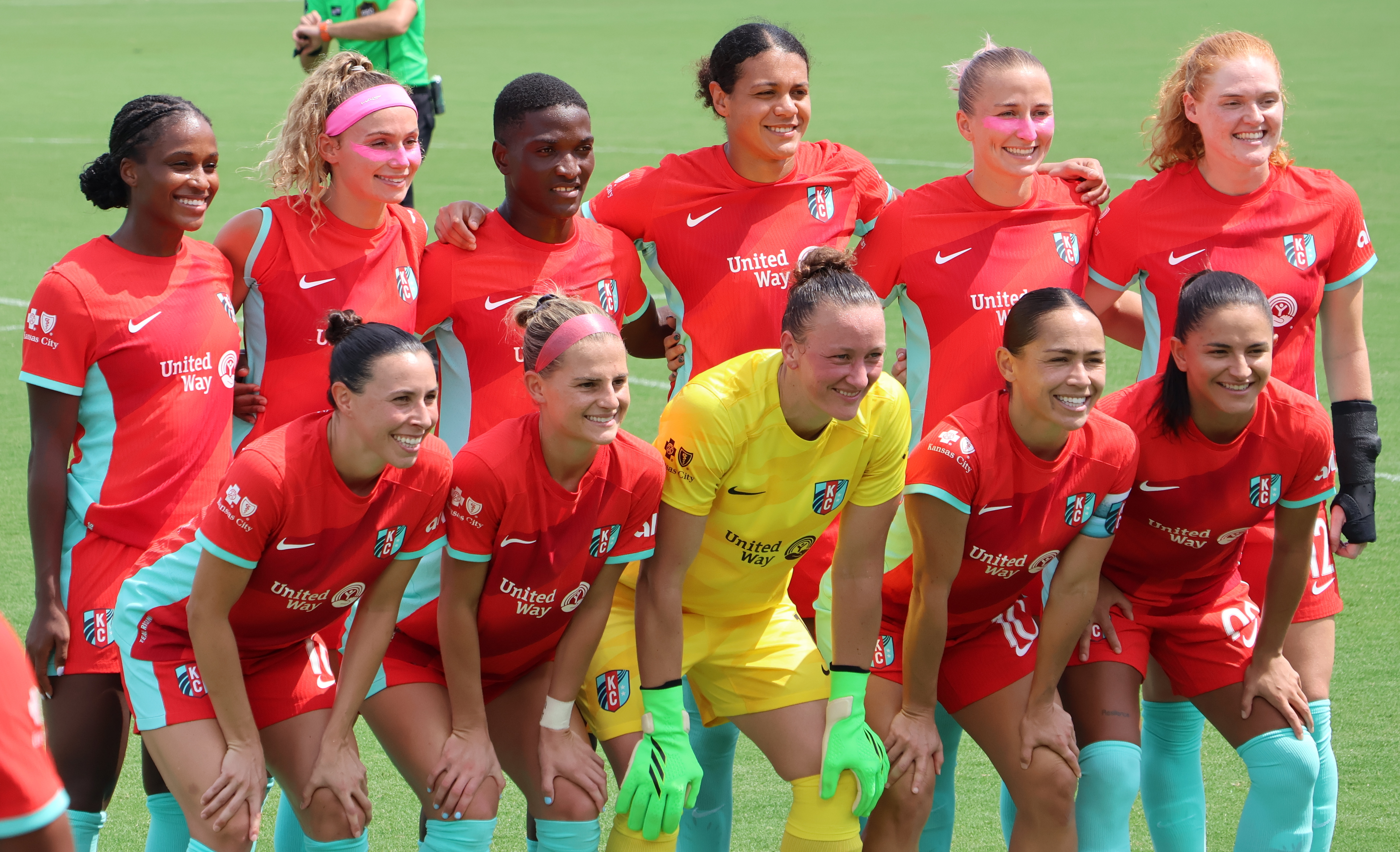
Kansas City Current lineup, week 18 of 2024: Prince, Wheeler, Chawinga, Cook, Mace, Ballisager DiBernardo, Feist, Schult, LaBonta, Debinha

Kansas City Current is an American women's soccer club which began play in the National Women's Soccer League (NWSL) in 2021 as Kansas City NWSL. It is the successor to FC Kansas City, the previous Kansas City-based team to compete in the NWSL from 2013–2017, and relocated the roster of Utah Royals FC, which suspended operations in 2020.

All Kansas City Current players who have appeared for the team in an official competition are listed below.

== Key ==
- The list is ordered alphabetically.
- Appearances as a substitute are included.
- Statistics are correct as of November 22, 2025, the end of the 2025 National Women's Soccer League season, and are updated once a year after the conclusion of the NWSL season.
- Players whose names are highlighted in **bold** were active players on the Kansas City Current roster as of the list's most recent update.

Positions key
| GK | Goalkeeper |
| DF | Defender |
| MF | Midfielder |
| FW | Forward |

Nationality
Unless otherwise noted, the nationality of a player is determined by the country they most recently represented in international play, or if said player has not played international football then by their country of birth.
Position
Playing positions are listed according to the player's roster designation as of the list's most recent update.
Years
Years are defined as the first and last calendar years in which the player was rostered for the club in any of the competitions listed below.
Appearances and goals
This list counts appearances and goals in the NWSL, NWSL playoffs, NWSL Challenge Cup, and NWSL x Liga MX Femenil Summer Cup.

== Players ==
| Yrs | No. | Pos | Nat | Player | Total | | NWSL | | Playoffs | | Cup (Note: Includes the NWSL Challenge Cup) | | Other (Note: Includes the 2024 NWSL x Liga MX Femenil Summer Cup) | |
| Yrs | No. | Pos | Nat | Player | Apps | Goals | Apps | Goals | Apps | Goals | Apps | Goals | Apps | Goals |
|---|---|---|---|---|---|---|---|---|---|---|---|---|---|---|
| 2024 | 32 | MF | (United States) USA | Grace Bahr | 1 | 0 | 0 | 0 | 0 | 0 | 0 | 0 | 1 | 0 |
| 2021– | 7 | DF | (United States) USA | Elizabeth Ball (Note: Acquired upon the team's formation via the league's relocation of player rights from Utah Royals FC, in addition to rights to Gunnhildur Yrsa Jónsdóttir, Tziarra King, Taylor Lytle, Diana Matheson, and Arielle Ship, who did not play for Kansas City.) | 103 | 3 | 88 | 3 | 4 | 0 | 10 | 0 | 1 | 0 |
| 2023–2024 | 12 | DF | (Denmark) DEN | Stine Ballisager | 25 | 1 | 21 | 1 | 1 | 0 | 0 | 0 | 3 | 0 |
| 2021 | 18 | GK | (United States) USA | Nicole Barnhart | 8 | 0 | 6 | 0 | 0 | 0 | 2 | 0 | 0 | 0 |
| 2021 | 23 | FW | (United States) USA | Elyse Bennett | 31 | 3 | 21 | 3 | 3 | 0 | 7 | 0 | 0 | 0 |
| 2021 | 6 | DF | (New Zealand) NZL | Katie Bowen | 20 | 0 | 17 | 0 | 0 | 0 | 3 | 0 | 0 | 0 |
| 2024– | 5 | DF | (United States) USA | Ellie Bravo-Young | 52 | 4 | 44 | 2 | 3 | 1 | 0 | 0 | 5 | 1 |
| 2024– | 6 | FW | (Malawi) MWI | Temwa Chawinga | 53 | 39 | 48 | 35 | 2 | 1 | 0 | 0 | 3 | 3 |
| 2023 | 6 | MF | (United States) USA | Rylan Childers | 10 | 0 | 4 | 0 | 0 | 0 | 6 | 0 | 0 | 0 |
| 2024– | 15 | DF | (United States) USA | Alana Cook | 22 | 0 | 17 | 0 | 2 | 0 | 0 | 0 | 3 | 0 |
| 2023– | 17 | FW | (United States) USA | Michelle Cooper | 74 | 14 | 62 | 12 | 2 | 0 | 5 | 1 | 5 | 1 |
| 2021 | 2 | DF | (Scotland) SCO | Rachel Corsie | 22 | 0 | 18 | 0 | 0 | 0 | 4 | 0 | 0 | 0 |
| 2022–2023 | 14 | MF | (United States) USA | Chardonnay Curran | 40 | 0 | 29 | 0 | 1 | 0 | 10 | 0 | 0 | 0 |
| 2023– | 99 | MF | (United States) USA | Debinha | 73 | 28 | 62 | 20 | 3 | 1 | 3 | 3 | 5 | 4 |
| 2024 | 43 | MF | (Philippines) PHI | Janae DeFazio | 1 | 0 | 0 | 0 | 0 | 0 | 0 | 0 | 1 | 0 |
| 2021–2023 | 29, 8 | DF | (United States) USA | Kate Del Fava | 70 | 1 | 53 | 0 | 3 | 1 | 14 | 0 | 0 | 0 |
| 2023– | 16 | MF | (United States) USA | Vanessa DiBernardo | 56 | 7 | 47 | 5 | 2 | 1 | 2 | 1 | 5 | 0 |
| 2021–2022 | 3 | DF | (United States) USA | Kristen Edmonds | 53 | 1 | 42 | 1 | 3 | 0 | 8 | 0 | 0 | 0 |
| 2024– | 22 | MF | (United States) USA | Bayley Feist | 33 | 1 | 25 | 1 | 3 | 0 | 0 | 0 | 5 | 0 |
| 2021–2024 | 1, 21 | GK | (United States) USA | Adrianna Franch | 73 | 0 | 57 | 0 | 3 | 0 | 9 | 0 | 4 | 0 |
| 2023 | 2 | MF | (United States) USA | Morgan Gautrat | 7 | 0 | 5 | 0 | 0 | 0 | 2 | 0 | 0 | 0 |
| 2023–2024 | 3 | DF | (Sweden) SWE | Hanna Glas | 1 | 0 | 0 | 0 | 0 | 0 | 0 | 0 | 1 | 0 |
| 2021–2025 | 25 | FW | (United States) USA | Kristen Hamilton | 72 | 23 | 53 | 10 | 4 | 1 | 11 | 10 | 4 | 2 |
| 2021 | 30 | FW | (United States) USA | Allie Hess | 1 | 0 | 1 | 0 | 0 | 0 | 0 | 0 | 0 | 0 |
| 2025– | 13 | FW | (United States) USA | Haley Hopkins | 21 | 1 | 20 | 1 | 1 | 0 | 0 | 0 | 0 | 0 |
| 2024–2025 | 14 | MF | (United States) USA | Claire Hutton | 55 | 1 | 47 | 0 | 3 | 0 | 0 | 0 | 5 | 1 |
| 2025 | 81 | GK | (United States) USA | Laurel Ivory | 2 | 0 | 2 | 0 | 0 | 0 | 0 | 0 | 0 | 0 |
| 2021 | 13 | FW | (United States) USA | Darian Jenkins | 23 | 3 | 22 | 3 | 0 | 0 | 1 | 0 | 0 | 0 |
| 2024–2025 | 33 | FW | (Kenya) KEN | Mwanalima Adam Jereko | 2 | 0 | 1 | 0 | 0 | 0 | 0 | 0 | 1 | 0 |
| 2021–2022 | 16 | FW | (United States) USA | Jaycie Johnson | 8 | 0 | 7 | 0 | 0 | 0 | 1 | 0 | 0 | 0 |
| 2022–2023 | 5 | FW | (United States) USA | Cece Kizer | 44 | 15 | 35 | 13 | 3 | 0 | 6 | 2 | 0 | 0 |
| 2021– | 9, 10 | MF | (United States) USA | Lo'eau LaBonta | 128 | 25 | 103 | 21 | 6 | 1 | 14 | 1 | 5 | 2 |
| 2025– | 30 | FW | (Angola) ANG | Flora Marta Lacho | 6 | 0 | 6 | 0 | 0 | 0 | 0 | 0 | 0 | 0 |
| 2021 | 21 | FW | (Argentina) ARG | Mariana Larroquette (Note: Larroquette was the team's first new international free-agent signing, announced on December 22, 2020.) | 21 | 2 | 19 | 2 | 0 | 0 | 2 | 0 | 0 | 0 |
| 2023 | 9 | FW | (Sweden) SWE | Mimmi Larsson | 25 | 2 | 20 | 2 | 0 | 0 | 5 | 0 | 0 | 0 |
| 2023–2024 | 78 | DF | (Brazil) BRA | Lauren | 5 | 1 | 5 | 1 | 0 | 0 | 0 | 0 | 0 | 0 |
| 2022–2024 | 94 | MF | (France) FRA | Claire Lavogez | 36 | 5 | 27 | 4 | 1 | 0 | 8 | 1 | 0 | 0 |
| 2021–2022 | 24 | DF | (United States) USA | Taylor Leach | 34 | 2 | 25 | 1 | 1 | 0 | 8 | 1 | 0 | 0 |
| 2021 | 26 | MF | (Canada) CAN | Jordyn Listro | 9 | 0 | 7 | 0 | 0 | 0 | 2 | 0 | 0 | 0 |
| 2022–2023 | 22 | DF | (United States) USA | Alex Loera | 43 | 2 | 30 | 0 | 3 | 1 | 10 | 1 | 0 | 0 |
| 2021–2023 | 66 | MF | (Australia) AUS | Chloe Logarzo | 9 | 0 | 6 | 0 | 0 | 0 | 3 | 0 | 0 | 0 |
| 2024 | 31 | MF | (United States) USA | Allie Long | 1 | 0 | 0 | 0 | 0 | 0 | 0 | 0 | 1 | 0 |
| 2025– | 19 | FW | (United States) USA | Mary Long | 10 | 0 | 10 | 0 | 0 | 0 | 0 | 0 | 0 | 0 |
| 2025– | 23 | GK | (Brazil) BRA | Lorena | 25 | 0 | 24 | 0 | 1 | 0 | 0 | 0 | 0 | 0 |
| 2021–2025 | 4 | DF | (United States) USA | Hailie Mace | 114 | 7 | 95 | 5 | 6 | 0 | 9 | 2 | 4 | 0 |
| 2021 | 19 | DF | (United States) USA | Michelle Maemone | 9 | 0 | 5 | 0 | 0 | 0 | 4 | 0 | 0 | 0 |
| 2024 | 66 | FW | (South Africa) RSA | Hildah Magaia | 6 | 0 | 6 | 0 | 0 | 0 | 0 | 0 | 0 | 0 |
| 2021–2022 | 28 | MF | (United States) USA | Addie McCain | 33 | 1 | 25 | 0 | 0 | 0 | 8 | 1 | 0 | 0 |
| 2022–2023 | 26 | DF | (United States) USA | Addisyn Merrick | 34 | 0 | 27 | 0 | 3 | 0 | 4 | 0 | 0 | 0 |
| 2022–2023 | 15 | MF | (United States) USA | Sam Mewis | 2 | 0 | 0 | 0 | 0 | 0 | 2 | 0 | 0 | 0 |
| 2022–2023 | 38 | GK | (United States) USA | Cassie Miller | 16 | 0 | 12 | 0 | 0 | 0 | 4 | 0 | 0 | 0 |
| 2021 | 5 | DF | (United States) USA | Sydney Miramontez | 3 | 0 | 1 | 0 | 0 | 0 | 2 | 0 | 0 | 0 |
| 2021–2022 | 27 | GK | (United States) USA | Carly Nelson | 1 | 0 | 1 | 0 | 0 | 0 | 0 | 0 | 0 | 0 |
| 2021–2022 | 13 | MF | (United States) USA | Maddie Nolf | 11 | 0 | 7 | 0 | 0 | 0 | 4 | 0 | 0 | 0 |
| 2024–2025 | 47 | FW | (United States) USA | Alex Pfeiffer | 15 | 1 | 14 | 1 | 1 | 0 | 0 | 0 | 0 | 0 |
| 2021 | 23 | DF | (United States) USA | Kiki Pickett (Note: Kiki Pickett was the first-ever NWSL Draft selection by Kansas City NWSL, selected fourth overall in the 2021 NWSL Draft.) | 16 | 0 | 16 | 0 | 0 | 0 | 0 | 0 | 0 | 0 |
| 2021–2022 | 99 | MF | (Canada) CAN | Victoria Pickett | 44 | 2 | 35 | 1 | 0 | 0 | 9 | 1 | 0 | 0 |
| 2024–2025 | 8 | FW | (Canada) CAN | Nichelle Prince | 37 | 3 | 34 | 3 | 3 | 0 | 0 | 0 | 0 | 0 |
| 2025 | 25 | FW | (United States) USA | Brittany Ratcliffe | 1 | 0 | 0 | 0 | 0 | 0 | 1 | 0 | 0 | 0 |
| 2023– | 24 | DF | (United States) USA | Gabrielle Robinson | 45 | 1 | 39 | 1 | 0 | 0 | 6 | 0 | 0 | 0 |
| 2021 | 8 | FW | (United States) USA | Amy Rodriguez | 14 | 4 | 10 | 2 | 0 | 0 | 4 | 2 | 0 | 0 |
| 2022– | 18 | DF | (United States) USA | Izzy Rodriguez | 105 | 5 | 85 | 5 | 4 | 0 | 13 | 0 | 3 | 0 |
| 2025– | 11 | MF | (Costa Rica) CRC | Rocky Rodríguez | 20 | 0 | 20 | 0 | 0 | 0 | 0 | 0 | 0 | 0 |
| 2021 | 0 | GK | (United States) USA | Katelyn Rowland | 4 | 0 | 4 | 0 | 0 | 0 | 0 | 0 | 0 | 0 |
| 2024 | 1 | GK | (Germany) GER | Almuth Schult | 12 | 0 | 9 | 0 | 2 | 0 | 0 | 0 | 1 | 0 |
| 2021–2024 | 11 | MF | (Canada) CAN | Desiree Scott | 58 | 0 | 42 | 0 | 4 | 0 | 10 | 0 | 2 | 0 |
| 2025– | 31 | DF | (United States) USA | Katie Scott | 2 | 0 | 2 | 0 | 0 | 0 | 0 | 0 | 0 | 0 |
| 2025– | 21 | MF | (United States) USA | Ally Sentnor | 12 | 0 | 11 | 0 | 1 | 0 | 0 | 0 | 0 | 0 |
| 2024– | 27 | DF | (United States) USA | Kayla Sharples | 36 | 2 | 32 | 2 | 3 | 0 | 0 | 0 | 1 | 0 |
| 2021 | 77 | FW | (Portugal) POR | Jéssica Silva | 14 | 0 | 14 | 0 | 0 | 0 | 0 | 0 | 0 | 0 |
| 2021 | 1 | GK | (United States) USA | Abby Smith | 8 | 0 | 6 | 0 | 0 | 0 | 2 | 0 | 0 | 0 |
| 2023 | 23 | DF | (United States) USA | Croix Soto | 15 | 0 | 12 | 0 | 0 | 0 | 3 | 0 | 0 | 0 |
| 2023–2024 | 77 | FW | (United States) USA | Alexa Spaanstra | 35 | 3 | 26 | 3 | 0 | 0 | 5 | 0 | 4 | 0 |
| 2024–2025 | 2 | DF | (United States) USA | Regan Steigleder | 8 | 0 | 4 | 0 | 0 | 0 | 0 | 0 | 4 | 0 |
| 2021 | 42 | FW | (United States) USA | Raisa Strom-Okimoto | 1 | 0 | 0 | 0 | 0 | 0 | 1 | 0 | 0 | 0 |
| 2022 | 42 | FW | (United States) USA | Jada Talley | 1 | 0 | 1 | 0 | 0 | 0 | 0 | 0 | 0 | 0 |
| 2021 | 15 | FW | (United States) USA | Michele Vasconcelos | 14 | 1 | 10 | 0 | 0 | 0 | 4 | 1 | 0 | 0 |
| 2021 | 14 | MF | (United States) USA | Gaby Vincent | 19 | 0 | 16 | 0 | 0 | 0 | 3 | 0 | 0 | 0 |
| 2021–2024 | 20 | DF | (United States) USA | Mallory Weber | 26 | 0 | 20 | 0 | 0 | 0 | 6 | 0 | 0 | 0 |
| 2022 | 6 | FW | (United States) USA | Lynn Williams | 1 | 0 | 0 | 0 | 0 | 0 | 1 | 0 | 0 | 0 |
| 2022–2023 | 19 | DF | (United States) USA | Jenna Winebrenner | 32 | 0 | 19 | 0 | 0 | 0 | 13 | 0 | 0 | 0 |
| 2024–2025 | 9 | FW | (Brazil) BRA | Bia Zaneratto | 41 | 12 | 40 | 12 | 1 | 0 | 0 | 0 | 0 | 0 |

== See also ==
- List of FC Kansas City players
- List of Utah Royals FC players
- List of top-division football clubs in CONCACAF countries
- List of professional sports teams in the United States and Canada
