= Thori Staples Bryan =

American soccer player (born 1974)

Personal information
- Full name: Thori Yvette Staples Bryan
- Birth name: Thori Yvette Staples
- Date of birth: April 17, 1974 (age 52)
- Place of birth: Baltimore, Maryland, U.S.
- Height: 5 ft 8 in (1.73 m)
- Position: Defender

College career
| Years | Team | Apps | (Gls) |
| 1992–1995 | NC State Wolfpack | | |

Senior career*
| Years | Team | Apps | (Gls) |
| 1998–2000 | Raleigh Wings | | |
| 1999 | Fortuna Hjørring | | |
| 2001–2003 | Bay Area CyberRays | 62 | (0) |
| 2004 | Carolina Dynamo | 8 | (0) |
| 2008 | Carolina Railhawks | | |

International career
| 1993–2003 | United States | 65 | (1) |
Medal record
Women's football (soccer)
Representing the United States
Olympic Games
| Gold medal – first place | 1996 Atlanta | Team |
- * Club domestic league appearances and goals

Thori Yvette Staples Bryan (née Staples; born April 17, 1974) is an American retired soccer defender who previously played for the United States women's national soccer team and the Bay Area CyberRays in the Women's United Soccer Association.

== Early life ==
Bryan grew up in Joppatowne, Maryland and played soccer for the Columbia Crusaders for five years. She won state championships in long jump, 400-meter dash and 800-meter run.

=== North Carolina State University ===
In 1992, her first season with North Carolina State University, she started all 22 games and was named the ACC Rookie of the Year in 1992. During her time at North Carolina, she was a three-time All-Atlantic Coast Conference (ACC) and All-South Region selection.

Bryan was nominated for the Missouri Athletic Club National Player of the Year award in 1994 and 1995. During her senior year, she started all 22 regular season games while the Wolfpack posted an 18–4–0 record and No. 9 national ranking.

== Playing career ==
=== Club ===
Staples-Bryan played for the San Jose CyberRays in the Women's United Soccer Association, the first professional soccer league in the United States, from 2001 to 2003 and was a key member of the 2001 Founders Cup Championship team. She was a first-round pick and the first American player to be selected in the inaugural draft.

In April 2004, Staples-Bryan signed for Carolina Dynamo. She made eight appearances for the club in the 2004 USL W-League season.

In 2008, after a more than four-year hiatus after the folding of the WUSA, she returned to play with the Carolina Railhawks in the W-League.

=== International ===
Bryan made her first appearance for the United States women's national soccer team on March 11, 1993, in a game against Denmark. She would go on to earn 64 caps with the team from 1993 to 2003.

In 1994, she helped the team win the title at the CONCACAF Qualifying Championship in Montreal and qualify for the 1995 FIFA Women's World Championship and FIFA Women's World Championship in Sweden.

Bryan was a member of the 1995 Women's National Team that placed third at Sweden. She was an alternate on the 1996 Olympic Team.

In 2003, she was named by national team head coach, April Heinrichs, as one of the 20 players that would travel to China for the Four Nations Tournament.

== Coaching career ==
Bryan was an assistant coach at Virginia Tech. She runs the Thori Bryan Soccer Academy in Wake Forest, North Carolina.

== Personal life ==
Staples Bryan married Kip Bryan in 1998.

== See also ==
- United States women's national soccer team
- Bay Area CyberRays
- Carolina Railhawks
