= Cary Lady Clarets =

- Full name: Cary Lady Clarets
- Nickname: Lady Clarets
- Founded: 2007
- Stadium: WakeMed Soccer Park
- Capacity: 7,130
- Chairman: (United States) Chris Economides
- Manager: (United States) Jay Howell
- League: USL W-League
- 2008: 5th, Atlantic Division
Home colours	Away colours

Cary Lady Clarets was an American women's soccer team, founded in 2007. The team was a member of the United Soccer Leagues W-League, the second tier of women's soccer in the United States and Canada. The team played in the Atlantic Division of the Eastern Conference.

The team played its home games at WakeMed Soccer Park in Cary, North Carolina. The club's colors was claret, blue and white.

The team was a sister organization of the men's Carolina RailHawks team, which plays in the USL First Division. The formation of the women's team was announced on November 30, 2007 at a press conference at WakeMed Soccer Park. The team was originally named Carolina RailHawks Women; in November 2008, Next Level Academy, which owns the club, announced a partnership with Burnley Football Club of the English Championship in order to jointly develop professional footballers; as part of the agreement, the team was renamed the Cary Lady Clarets.

The team folded after the 2009 season.

The team was coached by Jay Howell, Director of Coaching at the Capital Area Soccer League in Raleigh, North Carolina, and features many players with local amateur or collegiate affiliations from Triangle area high schools and universities such as the University of North Carolina at Chapel Hill, Duke University, and North Carolina State University.

== Players ==
=== Squad 2009 ===
Note: Flags indicate national team as defined under FIFA eligibility rules; some limited exceptions apply. Players may hold more than one non-FIFA nationality.

No.	Pos.	Nation	Player
0	GK	USA	Anna Rodenbough
1	GK	USA	Molly Baird
2	DF	USA	Sarah Jackyra
3	MF	USA	Casey Godwin
4	MF	USA	Kendall Bradley
5	MF	USA	Lindsey Jackson
6	MF	USA	Kelly Hathorn
7	MF	USA	Jane Alukonis
8	MF	USA	Morven Ross
9	FW	USA	Carrie Patterson
11	DF	USA	Thori Bryan
12	MF	USA	Sarah Winslow
14	MF	USA	Jennifer Bronson
15	FW	USA	Allie Wilkerson

No.	Pos.	Nation	Player
16	DF	USA	Betsy Frederick
17	FW	USA	Sterling Smith
21	MF	USA	Alison Baker
22	MF	USA	Bess Harrington
23	FW	USA	Kelly Attayek
24	DF	USA	Nicole Danford
25	DF	USA	Tara Knauss
26	FW	USA	McKenzie Burman
27	FW	USA	Casey Nogueira
28	DF	USA	Kimberly Crowe
29	MF	USA	Amanda Mueller
34	MF	USA	Mandy Moraca
—	MF	USA	CJ Ludemann

== Year-by-year ==
Year	Division	League	Reg. season	Playoffs
2008	1	USL W-League	5th, Atlantic	Did not qualify
2009	2	USL W-League	5th, Atlantic	Did not qualify
