= Sinead Farrelly =

Irish footballer (born 1989)

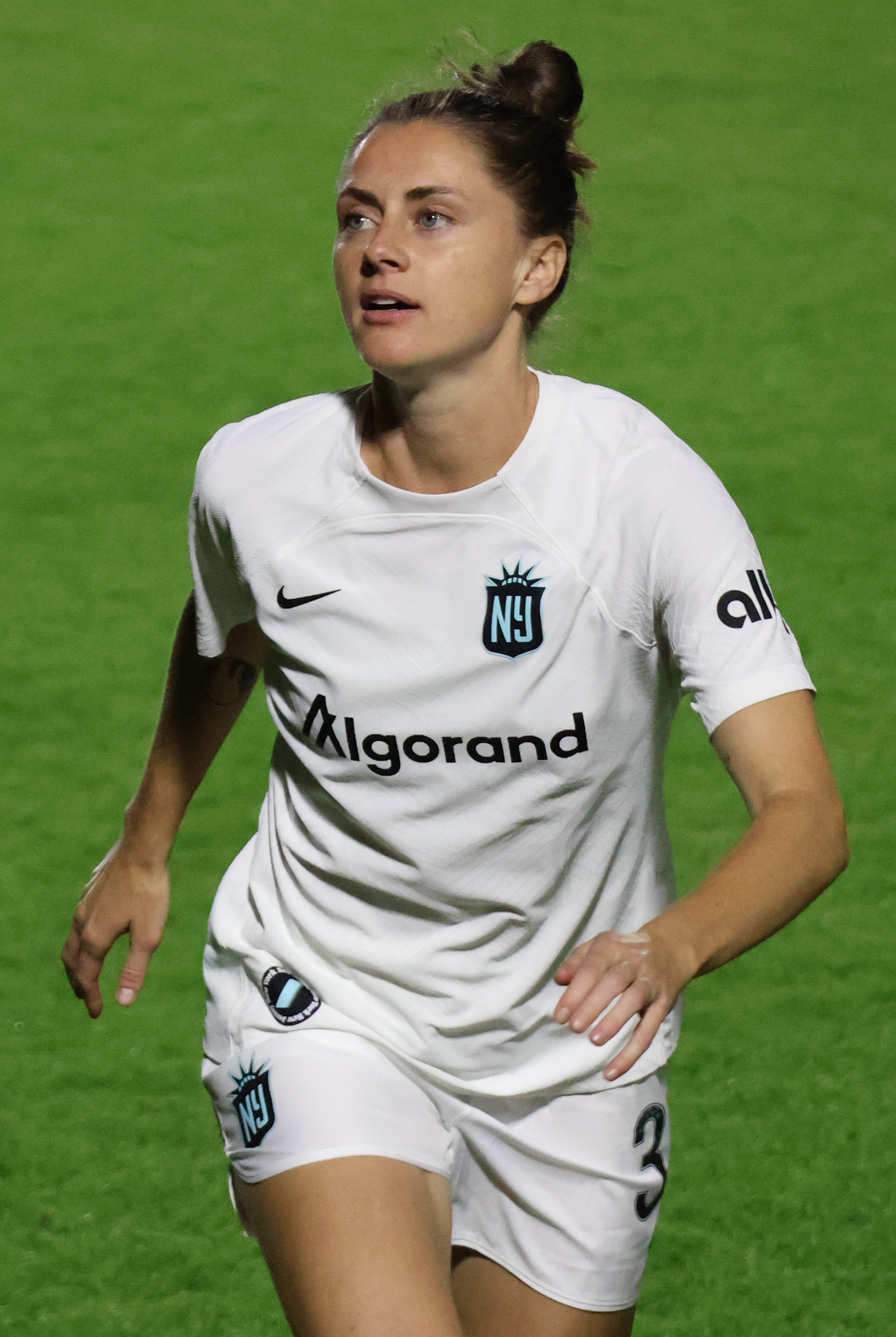
- Farrelly with Gotham in 2023

Personal information
- Full name: Sinead Louise Farrelly
- Date of birth: 16 November 1989 (age 36)
- Place of birth: Havertown, Pennsylvania, U.S.
- Height: 5 ft 5 in (1.65 m)
- Position: Midfielder

Youth career
- 2001–2005: FC Delco
- 2005–2006: Spirit United Gaels

College career
Years	Team	Apps	(Gls)
2007–2010	Virginia Cavaliers		

Senior career*
Years	Team	Apps	(Gls)
2011	Philadelphia Independence	14	(1)
2011–2012	New York Fury	1	(0)
2012	Apollon Limassol	5	(6)
2013	FC Kansas City	16	(1)
2013–2014	→ Apollon Limassol (loan)	10	(0)
2014–2015	Portland Thorns FC	36	(2)
2016	Boston Breakers	0	(0)
2023–2024	NJ/NY Gotham FC	22	(0)

International career^{‡}
2006	United States U-17		
2007–2008	United States U-20		
2009–2012	United States U-23		
2023	Republic of Ireland	8	(0)
- * Club domestic league appearances and goals as of 7 June 2024 ‡ National team caps and goals as of 29 April 2024

Sinead Louise Farrelly (born 16 November 1989) is a retired Irish professional footballer. Born and raised in the United States to an Irish father, she initially represented her country of birth at the youth international level before switching to play for the Republic of Ireland senior national team in 2023. She spent most of her professional career in the National Women's Soccer League. In 2011, she played for the Philadelphia Independence of the WPS and was a member of the United States women's national under-23 team. She was selected by the Philadelphia Independence as the No. 2 overall pick in the 2011 WPS Draft from University of Virginia. She was a Hermann Trophy semifinalist in 2009 and 2010.

In 2024, she announced her retirement from international and professional football due to post-concussion syndrome.

== Early life ==
Born and raised in Havertown, Pennsylvania, Farrelly began playing soccer at the age of five. She attended Haverford High School where she was a four-time team MVP and earned First Team All All-Southeastern PA honors. She was named a 2006 NSCAA Youth All-American and ranked seventh as the nation's top recruit by SoccerBuzz.

Farrelly was a member of the Spirit United Gaels club that was the 2006 National Runner-Up and was played for the Region I Olympic Development Program (ODP) team. During her time with the Spirit United Gaels, the team was a US Youth Soccer National Finalist (2006), a USYS Regional Champions (2006), and a Two-Time State Champions (2005 & 2006. Her team's incredible run in 2006, although cut short by a loss to FC Wisconsin Eclipse in the National Championship in Des Moines, Iowa, won their head coach, Sean McCafferty, the 2006 EPYSA Girls' Coach of the Year Award and 2006 NSCAA Regional Youth Girls' Coach of the Year Award. The Gaels made it through to Regionals the next year on a wildcard after a tough loss to the FC Pennsylvania Strikers in the State Cup Final. Their Regionals drive did not finish as they would have aspired to, as they did not even make the final this year.

=== University of Virginia ===
Farrelly attended the University of Virginia and played for the Cavaliers in the Atlantic Coast Conference (ACC). As a freshman in 2007, she started all 23 games and ranked third on the team with five goals (including three game-winners) and four assists. She was named First Team All-ACC, Second Team NSCAA All-Mid-Atlantic, and Top Drawer Soccer Co-National Rookie of the Year. During her sophomore season, she started all 23 games and ranked third on the team in scoring with five goals and three assists. She was named to the ACC All-Tournament Team, First Team All-ACC, and NSCAA and Soccer Buzz All Mid-Atlantic Region. As a junior, she started all 22 games and led the Cavaliers in scoring with eight goals and eight assists for a total of 24 points. She was named Second Team NSCAA All-America selection and was a MAC Hermann Trophy semifinalist. During her senior year, Farrelly was honored as the University of Virginia's top female athlete of 2010–11 after starting all 22 games and leading the Cavaliers with 12 goals and seven assists (for a total of 31 points). She was named ACC Offensive Player of the Year and was a NSCAA First Team All-American. She earned her fourth straight All-ACC selection and was a MAC Hermann Trophy semifinalist for the second time.

Farrelly's 90 games started ranks her second to future FC Kansas City teammate Becky Sauerbrunn in the school's history. She ranked eighth in school history with 84 points scored in her career and eighth for most in a season with 31.

== Club career ==
=== Philadelphia Independence, 2011 ===
Farrelly was the number two pick in the 2011 WPS Draft by the Philadelphia Independence. She tallied one goal and two assists for the Independence while starting in 13 of 14 games played (1,101 minutes). Her first WPS career goal occurred during a match against Western New York, which ended up being the game-winning goal and solidified a first place standing for the Independence in mid-July. The Independence would later come in second at the WPS Championship.

=== New York Fury, 2012 ===
After the WPS suspended operations in early 2012, Farrelly signed with the New York Fury in the WPSL Elite.

=== Apollon Limassol, 2012–2013 ===
Farrelly played for Apollon Limassol from 2012 to 2013 in the UEFA Women's Champions League. She made five starts in five games for the club and scored six goals. During this time. Farrelly broke her arm in their first leg of their first game of the Knockout Stage against ASD Torres CF.

=== FC Kansas City, 2013 ===
In 2013, Farrelly signed with FC Kansas City for the inaugural season of the National Women's Soccer League. She scored her first goal for the club in a home match against Seattle Reign FC, helping the Blues notch their first win for the season.

=== Apollon Limassol, 2013–2014 ===
At the end of the 2013 NWSL season, Farrelly joined Cypriot team Apollon Limassol for a second time, this time on loan from FC Kansas City. The loan spell ended on 31 January 2014.

=== Portland Thorns FC, 2014–2015 ===
On 13 January 2014, Portland Thorns FC announced that they had obtained Farrelly from FC Kansas City in exchange for a second-round draft pick (16th pick overall) in the 2014 NWSL College Draft. On April 11, 2015, Farrelly scored her first goal for the club, in a season-opening 4–1 win against the Boston Breakers.

=== Boston Breakers, 2016 ===
On 26 October 2015, Boston Breakers announced that they had obtained Farrelly from Portland Thorns FC in a package deal along with McCall Zerboni for first-round (No. 2 overall) and second-round (No. 20 overall) picks in the 2016 National Women's Soccer League College Draft. Farrelly sat the season out due to neck and back injuries sustained in a car crash.

In October 2016, Seattle Reign FC selected Farrelly off the NWSL Re-Entry Wire after the Breakers waived her at the end of the 2016 season. However, Farrelly announced her retirement on Facebook on 2 December 2016.

=== First Retirement, 2016–2023 ===
After her retirement, Farrelly moved back to Portland and worked as a nanny. After a brief marriage in 2019, she also participated in the George Floyd protests in Portland, then moved to California.

=== NJ/NY Gotham FC, 2023–2024 ===
In the summer of 2022, Farrelly decided to resume her professional football career, quit her job, and moved from California to Pennsylvania to resume training. Her former college coach Steve Swanson connected Farrelly to NJ/NY Gotham FC general manager Yael Averbuch West, who arranged a tryout. Farrelly chose Gotham in part due to the number of former Thorns teammates on the team, including Michelle Betos, McCall Zerboni, and Allie Long, and Averbuch West, who had competed against Farrelly during her own playing career.

On 25 March 2023, over six years after her retirement from professional soccer, Farrelly signed for NJ/NY Gotham FC on a one-year contract with an option for 2024. She debuted with Gotham FC on 1 April 2023, as a 70th-minute substitute against OL Reign.

On 7 June 2024, Farrelly announced her retirement from professional football due to post-concussion syndrome.

== International career ==
=== United States ===
Farrelly has represented the United States at the U-15, U-16, U-17, U-20, and U-23 levels. In 2011 she was called up to a United States Women's National Team (USWNT) training camp in the lead-up to the 2011 World Cup, but declined a successive invitation and did not go to the World Cup. It was stated later that the pressure she felt from her club coach, Paul Riley, factored into this decision.

=== Ireland ===
In April 2023, Farrelly was called up to the Republic of Ireland national team for the first time. She earned her first senior international cap with Ireland on 8 April 2023, by starting and playing 60 minutes in a friendly against the United States senior team.

In June 2023, Ireland called Farrelly up to its squad for the 2023 FIFA Women's World Cup and made her World Cup debut on 19 July 2023 by starting Ireland's opening group-stage match against Australia.

In April 2024, Farrelly announced her retirement from international football.

== Personal life ==
Farrelly began dating a Portland Thorns teammate during the 2014 season.

Farrelly got married in 2019, but divorced within ten months.

During her career, Farrelly was closely connected to former women's soccer coach Paul Riley, playing for three of his teams in three different leagues. She publicly revealed accusations of sexual coercion against Riley for a 2021 story in The Athletic. Soon after, Riley was fired from his position as head coach of the North Carolina Courage. Both the NWSL and FIFA commenced investigations, which resulted in Riley being banned from the NWSL for life.

She has described God as the most important thing to her.

== Career statistics ==
=== International appearances ===
Appearances by national team and year
National team	Year	Apps
Republic of Ireland	2023	8
Total		8

== Honours ==
NJ/NY Gotham FC

- NWSL Championship: 2023
