= Shawnee Mission District Stadium =

Sport stadium in Overland Park, Kansas

Coordinates: 39.021358°N 94.67113°W

- Interactive map of Shawnee Mission District Stadium
- Location: 7401 Johnson Drive; Overland Park, Kansas
- Owner: Shawnee Mission School District
- Operator: Shawnee Mission School District
- Capacity: 6,150
- Surface: Multi-use artificial surface

Construction
- Opened: 2005

Tenants
- Shawnee Mission North High School; Shawnee Mission Northwest High School; Sporting Kansas City (2008); FC Kansas City (2013)

Shawnee Mission District Stadium is a multi-purpose sport stadium located in Overland Park, Kansas. The facility is primarily used by Shawnee Mission North High School, Shawnee Mission Northwest High School and Shawnee Mission East High School. In the 2013 season of the National Women's Soccer League, the stadium served as the home field for FC Kansas City. Sporting Kansas City, then called the Kansas City Wizards, played at the stadium in a match against the Colorado Rapids during the 2008 Lamar Hunt U.S. Open Cup.

The stadium is one of two in the Shawnee Mission School District. The other is at Shawnee Mission South High School.

== Stadium ==
After demolition of the stadium originally built in the 1950s, the current stadium was built in 2005. The turf was refinished in 2006. The stadium features a 6,150 seating capacity, multi-use artificial surface with a track around it, and seating on each sideline.

In February 2013, team president, Bud Budzinski, announced that the stadium would be the home field for the FC Kansas City for the inaugural season of the National Women's Soccer League, a new professional women's soccer league in the United States. It is the third largest stadium in the NWSL after Jeld-Wen Field in Portland, Oregon, home of the Portland Thorns and Sahlen's Stadium in Rochester, New York, home of the Western New York Flash.

The field was known as Verizon Wireless Field for FC Kansas City games in 2013 due to a partnership with Verizon Wireless.

== See also ==
- Shawnee Mission North High School
- Shawnee Mission Northwest High School
- FC Kansas City
