= Teresa Noyola =

Mexican footballer (born 1990)

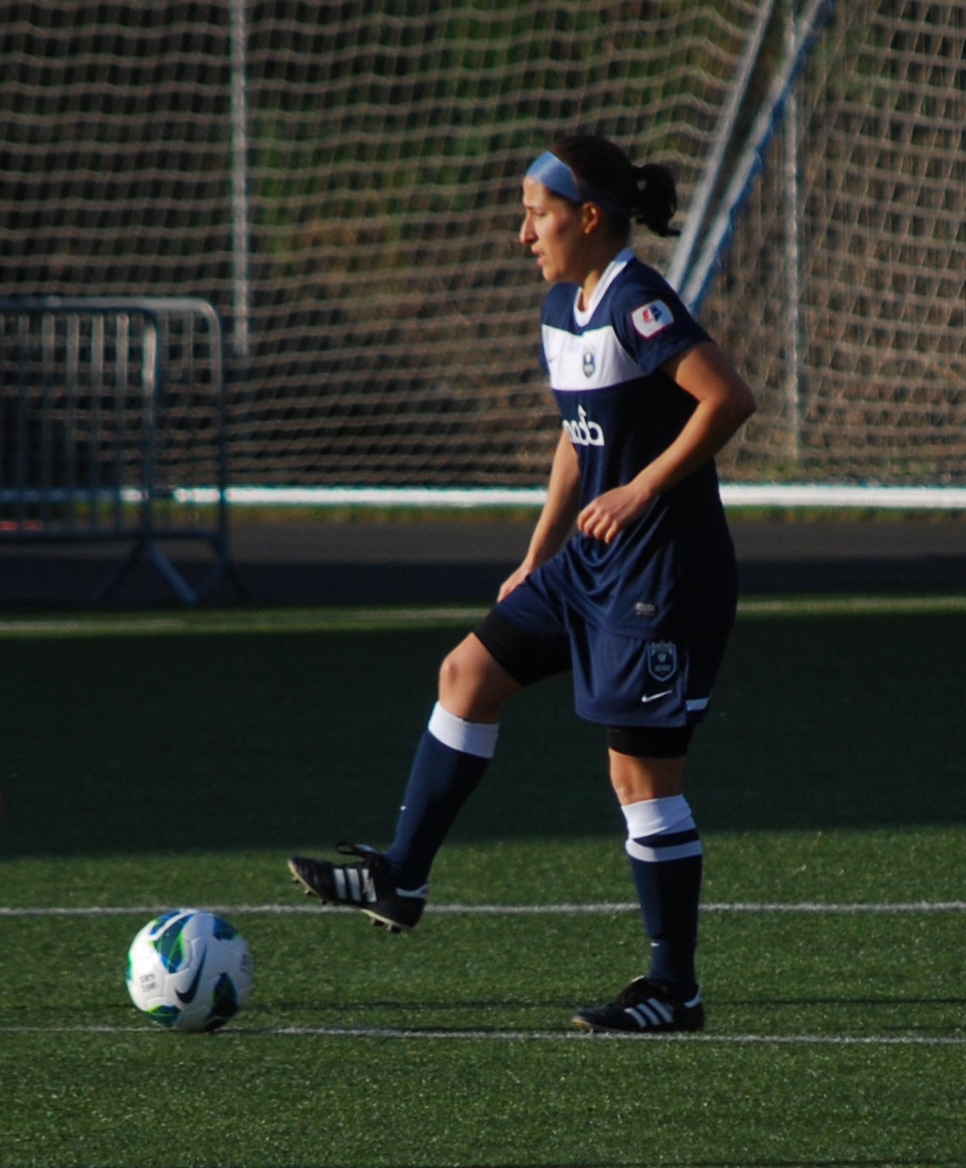
- Noyola playing for Seattle Reign FC

Personal information
- Full name: Teresa Noyola Bayardo
- Date of birth: 15 April 1990 (age 36)
- Place of birth: Mexico City, Mexico
- Height: 1.57 m (5 ft 2 in)
- Positions: Attacking midfielder; striker

Team information
- Current team: Oakland Soul
- Number: 22

Youth career
- 2004–2008: MVLA Mercury

College career
| Years | Team | Apps | (Gls) |
| 2008–2011 | Stanford Cardinal | 102 | (31) |

Senior career*
| Years | Team | Apps | (Gls) |
| 2008 | California Storm | | |
| 2012–2013 | ADO Den Haag | 15 | (3) |
| 2013 | Seattle Reign FC | 11 | (1) |
| 2013 | FC Kansas City | 7 | (0) |
| 2014 | Houston Dash | 10 | (3) |
| 2016 | California Storm | | |
| 2016–2017 | FC Kibi International University Charme | | |
| 2018 | Valur | 5 | (0) |
| 2023– | Oakland Soul | | |

International career^{‡}
| 2005–2007 | United States U-17 | | |
| 2008 | United States U-18 | | |
| 2007–2010 | United States U-20 | 26 | (5) |
| 2010–2018 | Mexico | 40 | (3) |
Medal record
Representing United States
Women's Football
Pan American Games
| Silver medal – second place | 2007 Rio de Janeiro | Team competition |
- * Club domestic league appearances and goals as of 21 September 2018 ‡ National team caps and goals as of 09:54, 18 June 2015 (UTC)

Teresa Noyola Bayardo (born 15 April 1990) is a Mexican footballer who plays as an attacking midfielder for Oakland Soul. She previously played for the Houston Dash, FC Kansas City, and Seattle Reign FC in the National Women's Soccer League, and for Icelandic club Valur. She has been a member of the Mexico women's national team. She also holds American citizenship. In 2011, she was the recipient of the Hermann Trophy award.

== Early life ==
Born in Mexico City, Mexico to Pedro Noyola and Bárbara Bayardo, Teresa was introduced to the game of soccer at an early age by her father who played baseball. Her family moved to the San Francisco Bay Area in California at age three. Noyola attended Palo Alto High School located across the street from Stanford University, where she would eventually attend college. She earned a high school GPA over 4.0 and was named the National Youth Club Player of the Year by the National Soccer Coaches Association of America, as well as National Scholar-Athlete of the Year.

=== Stanford University, 2008–2011 ===
Noyola attended Stanford University majoring in math and computational science. Her parents had also attended Stanford for their graduate-level education. During her senior year, Noyola scored nine goals and provided 15 assists. She also scored the winning and only goal against Duke in the national finals. During her four seasons playing for Stanford, she was a major component in helping the team earn a 95–4–4 record, including 53–0–1 at home.

In 2011, she was named Pac-12 Scholar-Athlete of the Year and the College Cup's Most Outstanding Offensive Player. The same year, she became the third consecutive Stanford student to be awarded the Hermann Trophy, following Kelley O'Hara in 2009 and Christen Press in 2010. The last incidence of a three consecutive school award streak was the University of North Carolina with Kristine Lilly in 1991, Mia Hamm in 1992 and 1993, and Tisha Venturini in 1994. As a senior, she won the Honda Sports Award as the nation's top soccer player. Noyola finished her career at Stanford with a total of 31 goals and 40 assists and 102 caps.

== Club career ==
=== ADO Den Haag, 2012–2013 ===
Noyola signed with Dutch side, ADO Den Haag for the 2012–2013 season. She made 15 appearances for the club, scoring three goals, before being released early to join the National Women's Soccer League in the United States.

=== Seattle Reign FC and FC Kansas City, 2013 ===
In 2013, she joined Seattle Reign FC as part of the NWSL Player Allocation for the inaugural season of the National Women's Soccer League. Noyola scored her first goal for the Reign during a match against the Washington Spirit on 16 May 2013. After a solid cross from Christine Nairn, Noyola headed it in between two defenders and past the Spirit goalkeeper. Noyola made 11 appearances for the Reign with eight starts. She scored one goal and served one assist before being traded mid-season to FC Kansas City.

On 1 July 2013, it was announced that Noyola had been traded to FC Kansas City for Renae Cuellar. She made seven appearances for the club during the 2013 season. Kansas City finished second during the regular season advancing to the playoffs, however they were eliminated in the semifinal match against eventual champions Portland Thorns after being defeated 3–2 in overtime.

=== Houston Dash, 2014 ===
In January 2014, Noyola was allocated to expansion team Houston Dash for the 2014 season via changes to the NWSL Player Allocation. She scored two goals against the Boston Breakers on 20 April leading to the team's first win in the expansion team's history. She was subsequently named NWSL Player of the Week for week 2 of the 2014 season. The Dash finished their first season in last place with a 5–3–16 record. Noyola made ten appearances for the club and scored three goals. In January 2015, it was announced that Noyola would not be joining the Dash for the 2015 season.

== International career ==
Noyola played for the United States national team programs from the age of 14 to 20. As a young teenager, she was moved up to U-16 team. At age 17, she began playing for the United States women's national under-20 soccer team. In 2010, at age 20, she joined the Mexico women's national football team, and will not be allowed to play again for the United States.

Noyola was part of Mexico's squad at the 2011 and 2015 World Cup.

== Personal life ==
Besides playing soccer, Noyola loves playing the drums. Her nickname is "T."

== See also ==
- List of Mexican Fútbol (soccer) athletes
- List of Stanford University people
