= Huw Williams =

Welsh soccer coach

Personal information
- Full name: Huw John Williams
- Date of birth: 20 November 1960 (age 65)
- Place of birth: Porthmadog, Wales

Team information
- Current team: Kansas City Current (technical staff)

Managerial career
- Years: Team
- 2013–2016: FC Kansas City (assistant/tech. director)
- 2021: Kansas City Current

Huw John Williams (born 20 November 1960) is a Welsh football coach and former player who was previously the head coach of Kansas City NWSL in the American National Women's Soccer League (NWSL) for their inaugural season.

== Early life ==
Born in Porthmadog, Gwynedd, Williams attended Cardiff University where he played football for the British Colleges and the All British Students teams. While at Cardiff, he was selected to play in the World Student Games in Tokyo. At age 14, he joined professional club Blackburn Rovers F.C. where he played for five years.

== Coaching career ==
=== Early coaching in the US ===
Williams is a former director of coaching for Kansas Youth Soccer and a member of the Regional II coaching staff of the United States Youth Soccer Association. He was the men's coach at Avila University in Kansas City, Missouri, from 1989 to 1992.

Williams was a founder, assistant coach and general manager of the now-defunct FC Kansas City of the National Women's Soccer League. He was also the sports manager for GSI Sports, a US youth football tournament and league management company.

=== Kansas City (2021) ===
On 29 January 2021, Williams was announced as the head coach of the new expansion team Kansas City NWSL. After one season as head coach he moved to a technical-staff scouting and talent identification role. The club went 3-14-7 in his lone year at the helm finishing last in the NWSL with 16 points. Williams transitioned to a front office role with the newly-named Kansas City Current but was relieved of his duties by November 2022 following accusations of disrespectful and inappropriate conduct towards the team's roster.

== Personal life ==
His daughter, Nia Williams, played soccer professionally for FC Kansas City in the NWSL.
