= Jaime French =

American soccer player (born 1989)

Personal information
- Full name: Jaime French
- Birth name: Jaime Orewiler
- Date of birth: November 9, 1989 (age 37)
- Place of birth: Wheaton, Illinois
- Height: 5 ft 3 in (1.60 m)
- Position: Forward

College career
Years	Team	Apps	(Gls)
2008–2011	Wheaton Thunder		

Senior career*
Years	Team	Apps	(Gls)
2010	Chicago Red Eleven		
2013	FC Kansas City	1	(0)
- * Club domestic league appearances and goals

Jaime French (née Orewiler; born November 9, 1989) is an American former women's soccer player who played for FC Kansas City in the National Women's Soccer League (NWSL).

== Career ==
French played for the Chicago Red Eleven of the USL W-League in 2010. In 2011, she was named the NSCAA Division III Women's Soccer Player of the Year. She was added to the roster of FC Kansas City in June 2013.

French was one of 65 players who participated in NWSL club FC Kansas City's open tryouts in February 2013, and one of nine players called into the team's amateur reserves by coach Vlatko Andonovski. She trained as an amateur reserve for FC Kansas City through the 2013 season until the club signed her to a professional contract for the remainder of the season on July 31, 2013. After making one appearance for the team, FC Kansas City waived her on February 20, 2014.

== Personal life ==
She married Josh French in June 2012. Josh was killed in a car accident in March 2013.
