= Casey Loyd =

American soccer player (born 1989)

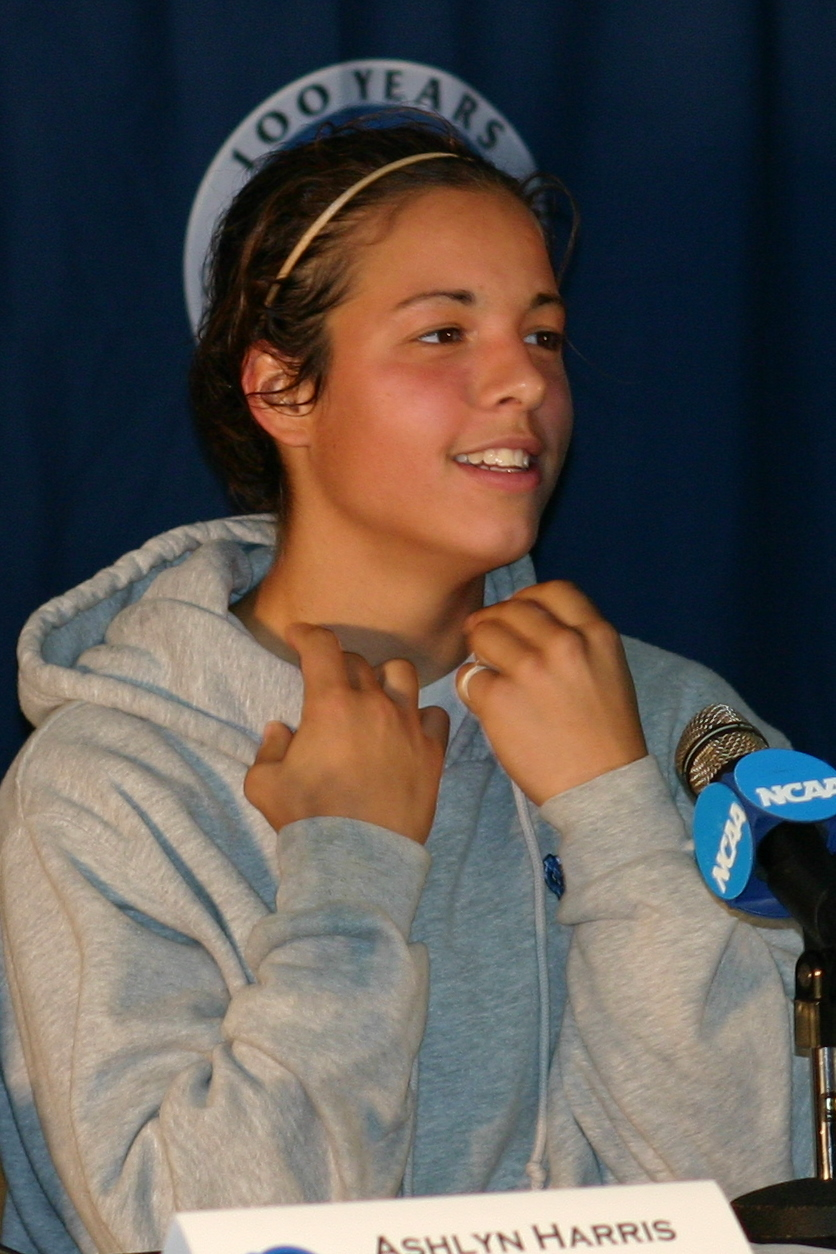
- December 2006

Personal information
- Full name: Casey Nicole Loyd
- Birth name: Casey Nicole Nogueira
- Date of birth: February 23, 1989 (age 37)
- Place of birth: San Diego, California, United States
- Height: 5 ft 6 in (1.68 m)
- Position: Midfielder

Youth career
- 2004–2006: CASL Spartan Elite

College career
Years	Team	Apps	(Gls)
2006–2009	North Carolina Tar Heels		

Senior career*
Years	Team	Apps	(Gls)
2008–2009	Cary Lady Clarets	10	(7)
2010	Chicago Red Stars	24	(3)
2011	Sky Blue FC	18	(5)
2012	FC Dallas Women		
2013	FC Kansas City	4	(1)

International career^{‡}
2007–2010	United States	5	(0)
Medal record
Women's soccer
Representing the United States
Pan American Games
Silver medal – second place	2007 Rio de Janeiro	Team
- * Club domestic league appearances and goals as of May 26, 2013 ‡ National team caps and goals as of May 22, 2010

Casey Nicole Loyd (née Nogueira; born February 23, 1989) is an American former professional soccer midfielder. She played collegiately for the North Carolina Tar Heels, where she won two national championships. She played professionally for the Los Angeles Sol, Sky Blue FC, and Chicago Red Stars of the WPS and FC Kansas City of the NWSL. She earned five caps with the United States national team. As a member of the national under-20 team, she played at the 2006 FIFA U-20 Women's World Championship and the 2007 Pan American Games.

== Early life ==
Daughter of Victor Nogueira, Casey was born in San Diego, California while her father played for the San Diego Sockers. She began playing soccer when she was five. In 1992, her father moved to the Milwaukee Wave where he played for 12 seasons. Nogueira grew up in nearby Cedarburg, Wisconsin with her mother. Her father coached her on local boys' teams until she entered Cedarburg High School at which point, she played for the girls' soccer team. In 2004, having spent her freshman year in Wisconsin, Nogueira moved to Raleigh, North Carolina with her mother.

In North Carolina, Nogueira attended Broughton High School. She was the 2005 Gatorade Player of the Year. She was a 2005 Parade Magazine and NSCAA high school All American and graduated a year early in 2006. The Capitals won one state championship and finished runner up once during her two years with the team. She was the 2005 state championship MVP. In addition to her high school team, Nogueira also played for the CASL Spartan Elite, winning the 2005 regional championship and finishing third at the national U-17 championship.

=== University of North Carolina ===
In 2006, Nogueira played for the North Carolina Tar Heels women's soccer team. The Tar Heels won the 2006 National Championship. While Nogueira had started only one game that season, she started both the semifinal and final games due to team injuries. Nogueira scored in both games, earning a position on the all tournament team. She led the team in scoring with 21 goals her junior season, capping the year when she scored both goals as UNC won the 2008 NCAA championships, 2–1 over the University of Notre Dame. As a junior, she won the Honda Sports Award as the nation's top soccer player.

== Playing career ==
=== Club ===
==== Carolina RailHawk Women ====
In 2008, Nogueira signed with the Carolina RailHawks Women, now known as the Cary Lady Clarets, an expansion W-League team.

==== Los Angeles Sol ====
Nogueira was drafted 8th overall to the Los Angeles Sol.

==== Chicago Red Stars ====
After the Sol folded, Nogueira was drafted to the Chicago Red Stars. Nogueira made her WPS league debut for the Red Stars as a second-half substitute against Sky Blue FC on April 11, 2010, and scored her first league goal for the club against St. Louis Athletica on April 17, 2010.

==== Sky Blue FC ====
After Chicago Red Stars announced it would not be part of the Women's Professional Soccer in 2011, Nogueira signed as a free agent with Sky Blue FC on December 23, 2010. She was named Player of the Week on June 30, 2011.

==== FC Kansas City ====
WPS folded in January 2012 and rather than pursue top-flight soccer overseas, Nogueira and moved to Dallas area to be close to her boyfriend and FC Dallas defender Zach Loyd (the two became engaged that February and married in October). After a season with FC Dallas's women's team in the Women's Premier Soccer League, Nogueira –now known as Casey Loyd– was selected during the fourth round (30th overall) of the 2013 NWSL Supplemental Draft by FC Kansas City.

=== International ===
==== Youth teams ====
Noguiera entered the national team program in 2004, when she was called into the U-16 Women's National Team. She moved up to the U-17 team the next year. In 2006, she was a member of the U.S. U-20 women's national team which took fourth place at the 2006 FIFA U-20 Women's World Championship. In 2007, the U.S. entered its U-20 team in the 2007 Pan American Games even though the other participating nations sent their full national teams. The U.S. won the silver medal, falling to Brazil in the final. Noguiera scored a goal in each of the three group games.

==== Senior team ====
She earned her first cap with the senior team in a 1–1 tie with England on January 28, 2007. She started, but came off for Lindsay Tarpley at half time. She was called up to the senior team in May 2009 versus Canada but did not play. In February 2010, she was named to the Algarve Cup roster.

== Personal life ==
She married fellow Tar Heel and FC Dallas defender Zach Loyd on October 13, 2012. In 2012, the couple began coaching Vickery United, a youth soccer team for children of refugees in the North Dallas neighborhood of Vickery Meadow. They have two sons.
