= Nia Williams =

American soccer player (born 1990)

Personal information
- Full name: Nia Jensen
- Birth name: Nia Williams
- Date of birth: September 19, 1990 (age 36)
- Place of birth: Roeland Park, Kansas, U.S.
- Height: 5 ft 4 in (1.63 m)
- Position: Defender

College career
| Years | Team | Apps | (Gls) |
| 2009–2012 | Missouri State Lady Bears | | |

Senior career*
| Years | Team | Apps | (Gls) |
| 2013–2014 | FC Kansas City | 9 | (0) |
- * Club domestic league appearances and goals

Nia Jensen (née Williams; born September 19, 1990) is an American retired soccer player who played as a defender for FC Kansas City in the National Women's Soccer League.

== Early life ==
Born in Roeland Park, Kansas to Huw Williams and Nina Leek, Williams attended and played for St. James Academy in Lenexa, Kansas. In 2009, she was named Shawnee Dispatch Female Athlete of the Year for after starting as a defender all four years for St. James. A three-time all-state and two-time all-metro selection, Williams also earned all-conference and all-state academic honors in 2009 and all-county honors in 2008. She helped lead her squad to the state championship during her final two seasons at the school. In 2006, Williams was an all-conference honoree as a sophomore and earned her first of three consecutive team MVP awards as a freshman. In 2008, she was named conference defensive player of the year.

=== Missouri State University ===
Williams attended Missouri State University where she majored in elementary education. As a defender for the Missouri State Bears, Williams started every match on defense during her freshman season. She recorded one point with an assist and tallied three shots, two of which were on goal. Williams was named to the Missouri Valley Conference (MVC) All-Freshman squad and received All-MVC honorable mention honors. During her sophomore season in 2010, she led the squad with six assists. She was named MVC Defensive Player of the Week on September 7. Williams earned All-MVC second team honors and, after registering an assist in the MVC Championship match, was named to the MVC All-Tournament team. She was also named MVC Scholar-Athlete honorable mention. As a junior, Williams registered a team-high of five assists and was named an All-MVC second team selection. She also helped lead the defense to a 1.11 goals against average and eight shutouts.

During the span of her collegiate career, Williams started all 69 matches that she appeared in and was a three-time MVC Defensive Player of the Week honoree. A defensive leader, Williams was a major part of the Bears' defense that allowed just two home goals in nine matches during her final season.

== Club career ==
Williams was selected during the fourth round (27th overall) of the 2013 NWSL College Draft, going to FC Kansas City. She made her debut for the Blues during a match against the Boston Breakers on May 18, 2013, in which the squad won 2–0, continuing their undefeated streak at home.

== Personal life ==
Her father, Huw Williams, played professionally for the Blackburn Rovers in the U.K. and was an assistant coach for FC Kansas City. He later went on to be its general manager and the head coach of the new Kansas City Current club before being fired in 2021.
