= Gaby Vincent =

American soccer player (born 1997)

Personal information
- Full name: Gabrielle Marie Vincent
- Date of birth: December 7, 1997 (age 28)
- Place of birth: Columbia, Maryland, United States
- Height: 5 ft 8 in (1.73 m)
- Position: Defender

College career
Years	Team	Apps	(Gls)
2015–2018	Louisville Cardinals	54	(6)

Senior career*
Years	Team	Apps	(Gls)
2019–2020	Utah Royals	11	(0)
2021	Kansas City	16	(0)
2022	Washington Spirit	1	(0)

International career
2019	United States U23		
- * Club domestic league appearances and goals as of June 30, 2023

Gabrielle Marie Vincent (born December 7, 1997) is a former American women's soccer player who last played as a defender for the Washington Spirit. She works as a community outreach specialist for the Mayor of the District of Columbia's Office of LGBTQ Affairs.

She played college soccer at the University of Louisville.

== Early life ==
Vincent grew up in Columbia, Maryland, and is the daughter of Mark and Jennifer Vincent. She attended Oakland Mills High School for her freshman and sophomore years and transferred to McDonogh School for her junior and senior years. She also played for Maryland United FC under coach Shannon Higgins-Cirovski.

=== Louisville Cardinals, 2015–2018 ===
Vincent attended the University of Louisville where she played for the Cardinals women's soccer team from 2015 to 2018. She started in all 54 appearances and scored 6 goals and 3 assists. While in college, Vincent majored in mechanical engineering.

== Club career ==
After Vincent wasn't selected in the 2019 NWSL College Draft, she was invited to open try-outs by several teams, including the Utah Royals. Following try-outs with the Royals, Vincent was invited by coach Laura Harvey to remain with the team during preseason.

In April 2019, Utah Royals signed Vincent to their supplemental roster. She made her debut in a 1–1 draw against the North Carolina Courage on May 19, 2019. Vincent started seven games for the Royals while their internationals were away for the World Cup. On July 26, 2019, Vincent was signed to a full contract by Utah.

When the Royals dissolved after the 2020 season, Vincent's rights were transferred to expansion team Kansas City, where she made 16 appearances, 11 of them starts. After the 2021 season on December 20, 2021, Kansas City traded Vincent to the Washington Spirit for $25,000 in NWSL allocation money and a fourth-round pick in the 2023 NWSL Draft.

Vincent suffered a calf injury during the 2022 season, and the team placed her on its 45-day disabled list on May 1, 2022. She made one league and two cup appearances for the club.

On November 15, 2022, the Spirit announced that they had allowed Vincent's contract to expire, releasing her from the club.

== After soccer ==
As of May 30, 2023, Vincent was a community outreach and relations specialist for the Mayor of the District of Columbia's Office of LGBTQ Affairs, where she helped coordinate the Spirit's 2023 LGBT pride night.

In 2024, she become the color commentator for the Washington Spirit on WSBN radio, the Washington, D.C. area's ESPN radio affiliate.

In 2026, she was a recipient of the Torchbearer "Carrying Change" Awards' Illuminator Award.
