= Katie Kelly =

American-Canadian soccer player and manager

Katie LaForge
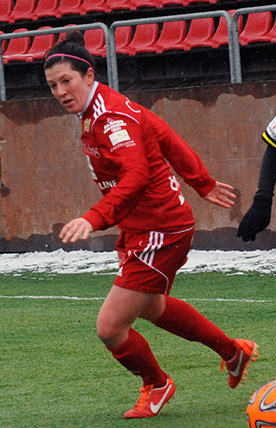

Personal information
- Full name: Kathleen Elizabeth Kelly
- Date of birth: June 2, 1987 (age 39)
- Place of birth: Kansas City, Missouri, U.S.
- Height: 5 ft 5 in (1.65 m)
- Position: Defender

Team information
- Current team: Avila Eagles (head coach)

College career
Years	Team	Apps	(Gls)
2005–2008	Marquette Golden Eagles		

Senior career*
Years	Team	Apps	(Gls)
2010	Kristianstads	20	(0)
2011	Hammarby	10	(1)
2011	F.C. Indiana	5	(0)
2012	Lokomotive Leipzig	11	(1)
2013	FC Kansas City	7	(0)
2014	Kokkola Futis 10	23	(6)
2015	Åland United	23	(2)
2017	KC Courage	10	(2)

International career
2011	Canada	0	(0)

Managerial career
- 2017: Kansas City Kansas Blue Devils (asst.)
- 2018–: Avila Eagles
- * Club domestic league appearances and goals as of End of Career

Kathleen Elizabeth Kelly (born June 2, 1987) is a former American-Canadian soccer player and current manager.

== Early life ==
Born and raised in Kansas City, Missouri by parents Neil and Shelley Kelly, Katie, attended and played for St. Teresa's Academy. She earned many accolades while playing for the Stars, helping them to state titles in 2002, 2003 and 2005. During her time with the squad, she scored 32 goals and served 59 assists. During her freshman year, she was an all-state second-team selection and first-team all-district selection. She was named first-team all-state, all-conference, all-district and all-metro during her final three years. During her senior year, she was named Missouri State Player of the Year, Western Region Player of the Year and was a high school All-America selection.

Kelly played club for the 2001 National Champions, five-time USYSA Kansas State Champions, K.C. Dynamo, who also were Region II champions in 2001 and 2005 and finalists in 2000, 2002, 2003. She helped the Missouri State '86 Olympic Development Program (ODP) team to the National Championship in 2004.

=== Marquette University ===
Kelly attended Marquette University where she majored in Public Relations. As a freshman in 2005, Kelly became Marquette's corner kick specialist and provided an offensive threat from the back line. She scored three goals and served four assists finishing with 11 points. She was named Big East Conference Rookie of the Week after a goal and an assist in the win over Northwestern on August 28. She was named to the Soccer Buzz Great Lakes All-Freshman Team and was also an honorable mention Freshman All-American by Soccer Buzz. During her sophomore year, she started in all 23 matches and was Marquette's secret weapon on offense serving up a team high of eight assists for the season – third best single season total in program history. She registered 10 total points on the season to rank her fourth on the team. She was named the Big East Defensive Player of the Week and to the Soccer Buzz Elite Team of the Week for the second consecutive week. Kelly was the only player in the conference in 2006 to earn repeat defensive player of the week honors. She earned Soccer Buzz All- Great Lakes Third Team honors. In 2007 during her junior season, Kelly started in all 20 games and lead the team with nine assists. Her 0.45 assists per game for the season rank as the third-best average in single-season history at Marquette. Her nine assists ranked third in the Big East Conference that year and also ranked third on Marquette's all-time list. As an integral member of a Marquette defense that allowed just 17 goals on the season, and shut out nine teams, Kelly garnered several prestigious post-season honors, including a third team All-Big East selection and a spot on the Soccer Buzz Great Lakes Region second team. It was also the third consecutive year she was honored by Soccer Buzz. In addition, she was named to the NSCAA All-Great Lakes third team and the Top Drawer Soccer College Team of the Season first team. During her senior year, Kelly started all 22 games and ranked second on the team with 2,015 minutes played. She received Fourth Team All-America accolades by Soccer Buzz and was selected to the 2008 second team All-BIG East – the third All-BIG EAST selection of her career. She was also named to the 2008 NSCAA All-Great Lakes Region Third Team as well as the First Team All-Great Lakes by Soccer Buzz.

== Playing career ==
=== Club ===
==== Kristianstads DFF ====
Kelly signed with Swedish side, Kristianstads DFF, in the Damallsvenskan for the 2010 season. She made 20 appearances for the squad with 12 starts for a total of 1,205 minutes.

==== FC Kansas City ====
In 2013, Kelly was signed by FC Kansas City as a discovery player headed into the inaugural season with the National Women's Soccer League.

==== Kansas City Courage ====
Kelly played the 2017 season for KC Courage.

==== National team ====
In 2011 earned a call up by John Herdman for the Canada, but the defender didn't play for the team.

=== Coaching career ===
==== Avila University ====
On 29 November 2017 was named as Head coach of the Women soccer team, of the Avila Eagles.

=== Personal life ===
On 29 December 2017 she married dentist Brian LaForge and took his name.
