= Maddie Nolf =

American soccer player

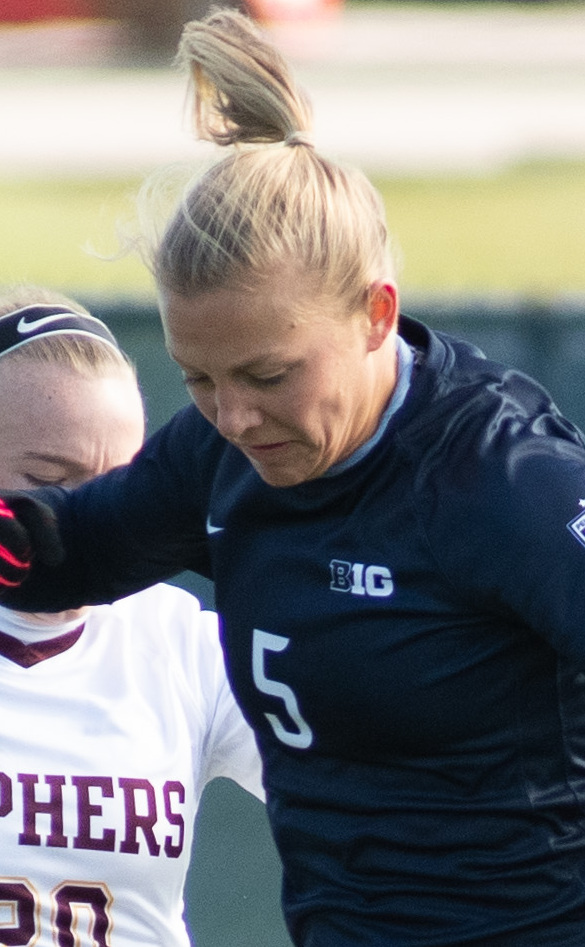
- Nolf with Penn State in 2018

Personal information
- Full name: Madeline Marie Nolf
- Birth name: Madeline Marie Elliston
- Date of birth: March 29, 1996 (age 30)
- Place of birth: Omaha, Nebraska, United States
- Height: 1.60 m (5 ft 3 in)
- Position: Defender

College career
Years	Team	Apps	(Gls)
2014–2018	Penn State Nittany Lions		

Senior career*
Years	Team	Apps	(Gls)
2019–2020	Utah Royals	1	(0)
2021–2022	Kansas City Current	7	(0)
2022–2023	Rangers	0	(0)

International career
2016	United States U-20		
- * Club domestic league appearances and goals

Madeline Marie Nolf (née Elliston; born March 29, 1996) is an American former professional soccer player who last played as a defender for Rangers in the Scottish Women's Premier League.

== Career ==
She was drafted by Utah Royals FC in the 2019 NWSL College Draft. She remained with the roster when it was transferred to Kansas City NWSL following the dissolution of Utah Royals FC.

On September 20, 2022, Kansas City transferred Nolf to Scottish club Rangers W.F.C. for an undisclosed transfer fee.

In June 2023, Rangers announced that Nolf would depart the club prior to the start of the 2023–24 season.

== Personal life ==
In June 2018, she married wrestler Jason Nolf.

== Honors ==
Penn State Nittany Lions

- NCAA Division I Women's Soccer Championship: 2015
