= 2019 Orlando Pride season =

Fourth season of Orlando Pride in the NWSL

Orlando Pride
2019 season
- CEO: Alex Leitão
- Head coach: Marc Skinner
- Stadium: Exploria Stadium; Orlando, Florida
- NWSL: 9th of 9
- Playoffs: Did not qualify
- Top goalscorer: Marta (6)
- Highest home attendance: 9,415 (June 20 vs. Sky Blue FC)
- Lowest home attendance: 3,703 (July 6 vs. Washington Spirit)
- Average home league attendance: 5,565
Home colors	Away colors

The 2019 Orlando Pride season was Orlando Pride's fourth season in the National Women's Soccer League, the top division of women's soccer in the United States. The team played its home games at Exploria Stadium, renamed from Orlando City Stadium on June 4, 2019. Following the departure of Tom Sermanni at the end of the 2018 season, Marc Skinner was announced as his replacement in January.

== Notable events ==
Seven players signed with Australian W-League teams to play with during the 2018–19 NWSL offseason: Chioma Ubogagu and Carson Pickett joined Brisbane Roar, Dani Weatherholt and Christine Nairn joined Melbourne Victory, Rachel Hill joined Perth Glory, Alanna Kennedy joined Sydney FC and Emily van Egmond joined Newcastle Jets. Alanna Kennedy, Rachel Hill and Christine Nairn were named to the W-League Team of the Season. Weatherholt and Nairn won the regular season Premiership title with Melbourne Victory and Kennedy won the 2019 W-League grand final with Sydney FC.

The team's opening day roster was announced on April 10 and included 17 returning squad members. Sydney Leroux was notably placed on the supplemental roster instead of being deactivated on maternity leave in the hope she returned before the end of the season. She returned on September 29, making an 86th minute substitute appearance against Sky Blue FC, just three months after giving birth.

On May 23, after losing Shelina Zadorsky, Emily van Egmond, Camila, Marta, Ali Krieger, Alex Morgan, Alanna Kennedy and Ashlyn Harris to the World Cup, the Pride temporarily signed three National Team Replacement players.

On August 7, the club announced that Toni Pressley underwent surgery and was beginning treatment for breast cancer. She was placed on the 45-day disabled list. The final game of the season was designated as a Breast Cancer Awareness match with the team wearing limited edition pink pre-match warm-up tops to be auctioned off later. All nine NWSL teams also donated autographed items for the online fundraising auction. Pressley made her first appearance since the surgery during the game, coming on as a substitute with Harris handing her the captain's armband.

On August 15, the club announced that Emily van Egmond would undergo season-ending ankle surgery in Australia. She was placed on the season ending injury list.

On September 16, the club announced that Alex Morgan would be placed on the season ending injury list following a knee injury picked up on international duty.

== Roster ==
As of September 16, 2019

No.	Nationality	Name	Position(s)	Date of birth (age)	Previous club	Notes
Goalkeepers
18	(United States)	Lainey Burdett	GK	December 22, 1996 (aged 22)	(United States) Arizona Wildcats	SUP
24	(United States)	Ashlyn Harris	GK	October 19, 1985 (aged 33)	(United States) Washington Spirit	FED
28	(United States)	Haley Kopmeyer	GK	June 28, 1990 (aged 28)	(United States) Seattle Reign FC	–
Defenders
3	(United States)	Toni Pressley	DF	February 19, 1990 (aged 29)	(United States) Houston Dash	–
4	(Canada)	Shelina Zadorsky	DF	October 24, 1992 (aged 26)	(United States) Washington Spirit	FED
11	(United States)	Ali Krieger	DF	July 28, 1984 (aged 34)	(United States) Washington Spirit	–
14	(Australia)	Alanna Kennedy	DF	January 21, 1995 (aged 24)	(United States) Western New York Flash	INT
16	(United States)	Carson Pickett	DF	September 15, 1993 (aged 25)	(United States) Seattle Reign FC	–
19	(United States)	Erin Greening	DF	June 20, 1997 (aged 21)	(United States) Colorado Buffaloes	–
21	(United States)	Julie King	DF	October 21, 1989 (aged 29)	(United States) North Carolina Courage	–
27	(United States)	Morgan Reid	DF	June 13, 1995 (aged 23)	(United States) North Carolina Courage	–
29	(Jamaica)	Alika Keene	DF	January 15, 1994 (aged 25)	(United States) Harvard Crimson	NTR
32	(United States)	Hana Kerner	DF	March 17, 1997 (aged 22)	(United States) Virginia Cavaliers	NTR
Midfielders
5	(Australia)	Emily van Egmond	MF	July 12, 1993 (aged 25)	(Australia) Newcastle Jets	INT D45
9	(Brazil)	Camila	MF	October 10, 1994 (aged 24)	(Brazil) Ferroviária	–
12	(United States)	Kristen Edmonds	MF	May 22, 1987 (aged 31)	(United States) Western New York Flash	–
17	(United States)	Dani Weatherholt	MF	March 17, 1994 (aged 25)	(United States) Santa Clara Broncos	–
20	(United States)	Abby Elinsky	MF	January 8, 1996 (aged 23)	(France) ASPTT Albi	–
22	(United States)	Bridget Callahan	MF	April 16, 1996 (aged 22)	(United States) UCF Knights	–
23	(United States)	Marisa Viggiano	MF	February 5, 1997 (aged 22)	(United States) Northwestern Wildcats	–
25	(United States)	Joanna Boyles	MF	November 13, 1995 (aged 23)	(United States) Chicago Red Stars	SUP
Forwards
2	(United States)	Sydney Leroux	FW	May 7, 1990 (aged 28)	(United States) FC Kansas City	SUP
7	(Scotland)	Claire Emslie	FW	March 8, 1994 (aged 25)	(England) Manchester City	INT
8	(United States)	Danica Evans	FW	June 2, 1995 (aged 23)	(United States) Colorado Buffaloes	–
10	(Brazil)	Marta	FW	February 19, 1986 (aged 33)	(Sweden) FC Rosengård	INT
13	(United States)	Alex Morgan	FW	July 2, 1989 (aged 29)	(United States) Portland Thorns FC	FED D45
15	(United States)	Rachel Hill	FW	April 17, 1995 (aged 23)	(United States) UConn Huskies	–
26	(United States)	Caitlin Farrell	FW	September 29, 1997 (aged 21)	(United States) Georgetown Hoyas	SUP

== Staff ==
As of February 27, 2019

Executive
Majority owner and chairman	(Brazil) Flávio Augusto da Silva
Minor owner/life president	(England) Phil Rawlins
Owner	(England) John Bonner
Chief executive officer	(Brazil) Alex Leitão
General manager	(Guam) Erik Ustruck
Coaching staff
Head coach	(England) Marc Skinner
Assistant coach	(England) Carl Green
Goalkeeping coach	(England) Lloyd Yaxley

== Transfers and loans ==
=== 2019 NWSL College Draft ===
Draft picks are not automatically signed to the team roster. The 2019 college draft was held on January 10, 2019. Orlando had two selections.

Round	Pick	Player	Pos.	College	Status
3	25	(United States) Erin Greening	DF	University of Colorado	Signed
4	30	(United States) Marisa Viggiano	MF	(Illinois) Northwestern University	Signed

=== Transfers in ===
Date	Player	Pos.	Previous club	Fee/notes	Ref.
April 4, 2019	(United States) Morgan Reid	DF	(United States) North Carolina Courage	Traded in exchange for Orlando's natural fourth round pick in the 2020 draft	
April 10, 2019	(United States) Abby Elinsky	MF	(France) ASPTT Albi	Free agent signing	
April 10, 2019	(United States) Bridget Callahan	MF	(United States) UCF Knights	Free agent signing	
April 10, 2019	(United States) Joanna Boyles	MF	(United States) Chicago Red Stars	Free agent signing; signed to supplemental roster	
April 10, 2019	(United States) Lainey Burdett	GK	(United States) Arizona Wildcats	Free agent signing; signed to supplemental roster	
April 10, 2019	(United States) Caitlin Farrell	FW	(United States) Georgetown Hoyas	Free agent signing; signed to supplemental roster	
May 23, 2019	(Jamaica) Alika Keene	DF	(United States) Harvard Crimson	National Team Replacement signing (short-term)	
May 23, 2019	(United States) Taylor Porter	MF	(United States) NC State Wolfpack	National Team Replacement signing (short-term)	
May 23, 2019	(United States) Hana Kerner	DF	(United States) Virginia Cavaliers	National Team Replacement signing (short-term)	
May 30, 2019	(Scotland) Claire Emslie	FW	(England) Manchester City	Free agent signing	
August 8, 2019	(United States) Julie King	DF	(United States) North Carolina Courage	Free agent signing (via Discovery)	

=== Transfers out ===
Date	Player	Pos.	Destination club	Fee/notes	Ref.
January 25, 2019	(Brazil) Poliana	DF	(Brazil) São José	Waived	
February 18, 2019	(Brazil) Mônica	DF	(Brazil) Corinthians	Contract expired	
February 26, 2019	(United States) Christine Nairn	MF	(United States) Houston Dash	Traded in exchange for a 2019 international roster spot and Houston's natural third and fourth round 2020 draft picks	
July 5, 2019	(United States) Taylor Porter	MF	(Serbia) Spartak Subotica	Released from National Team Replacement contract	
August 29, 2019	(England) Chioma Ubogagu	FW	(Spain) CD Tacón	Waived	

=== Preseason trialists ===
Orlando Pride began preseason training on March 4, 2019. The squad included eight non-roster invitees on trial with the team during preseason. A total of five were eventually signed by the team with another later added as a temporary national team replacement player.

2019 Orlando Pride trialists
Player	Position	Previous team
(United States) Lainey Burdett	GK	(United States) Arizona Wildcats
(Jamaica) Alika Keene	DF	(United States) Harvard Crimson
(United States) Kim Reynolds	DF	(United States) Orlando Kicks
(United States) Joanna Boyles	MF	(United States) Chicago Red Stars
(United States) Bridget Callahan	MF	(United States) UCF Knights
(United States) Abby Elinsky	MF	(France) ASPTT Albi
(United States) Leah Mohammadi	MF	(United States) Harvard Crimson
(United States) Caitlin Farrell	FW	(United States) Georgetown Hoyas

Signed to first team contract.
Signed to supplemental roster.
Signed as National Team Replacement player.

== Match results ==
As per league schedule, preseason camp began on March 4 with many of the squad still away on international duty. The Pride played their first ever preseason game against fellow NWSL opposition on March 23, taking part in North Carolina Courage's inaugural Friendship Cup which ended in a 4–0 defeat. On March 30, the Pride hosted the University of South Florida for a closed-door friendly, marking the fourth consecutive preseason meeting between the two teams. Liga PR Femenino champions Sol traveled to Orlando the week before the NWSL season began for the final preseason friendly, a match open to the public with for free. The Pride won both of their final two preseason games.

=== Preseason ===
March 23	North Carolina Courage	4–0	Orlando Pride	Cary, North Carolina
1 PM ET	Speck 35'; McDonald 61'; Williams 69'; Spetsmark 89'			Stadium: WakeMed Soccer Park
Note: Friendship Cup

March 30	Orlando Pride	6–0	South Florida Bulls	Sanford, Florida
	Ubogagu 1'; Unnamed 4' (o.g.); Hill 47', 49', 52'; Marta 54'			Stadium: Sylvan Lake Park; Attendance: Closed-door

April 7	Orlando Pride	5–0	Puerto Rico Sol	Orlando, Florida
5 PM ET	Camila 41' (pen.), 86'; Pickett 59'; Callahan 72'; Hill 83'			Stadium: Orlando City Stadium; Attendance: 2,137

=== National Women's Soccer League ===
Results summary

Overall								Home						Away					
Pld	W	D	L	GF	GA	GD	Pts	W	D	L	GF	GA	GD	W	D	L	GF	GA	GD
24	4	4	16	24	53	−29	16	2	1	9	10	24	−14	2	3	7	14	29	−15

Last updated: October 12, 2019.
Source: NWSLsoccer.com

Results by round

Round	1	2	3	4	5	6	7	8	9	10	11	12	13	14	15	16	17	18	19	20	21	22	23	24
Stadium	H	A	A	H	A	H	A	H	A	A	H	H	A	H	H	H	A	A	A	H	A	A	H	H
Result	L	L	D	L	L	L	L	L	D	W	L	W	L	W	L	L	W	L	L	L	L	D	L	D
Position (Note: ORL's position at the end of the matchweek, not their match.)	8	–	8	9	9	9	9	9	9	8	8	8	8	8	8	9	–	9	9	–	9	9	9	9

Updated to match(es) played on October 12, 2019. Source: NWSLsoccer.com
A = Away; H = Home; W = Win; D = Draw; L = Loss

Results

April 14 1	Orlando Pride	0–2	Portland Thorns FC	Orlando, Florida
5:00pm ET	Camila (yellow card) 90+1'	Report	Foord 45'; Heath 49'	Stadium: Orlando City Stadium; Attendance: 7,189; Referee: Ekaterina Koroleva

April 17 2	North Carolina Courage	5–0	Orlando Pride	Cary, North Carolina
7:00pm	Williams 45'; O'Sullivan (yellow card) 45+1'; McDonald 55'; Zerboni (yellow card) 64'; Dunn 70', 77'; Spetsmark 88'	Report	Marta (yellow card) 85'	Stadium: WakeMed Soccer Park; Attendance: 4,292; Referee: Danielle Chesky

April 21 3	Reign FC	1–1	Orlando Pride	Tacoma, Washington
10:00pm	Balcer 21'	Report	Kennedy 6'; van Egmond (yellow card) 58'; Morgan (yellow card) 90+3'	Stadium: Cheney Stadium; Attendance: 5,323; Referee: Reyna Fonseca

April 27 4	Orlando Pride	0–1	Utah Royals	Orlando, Florida
7:30pm	Kennedy (yellow card) 40'; Pickett (yellow card) 90'	Report	Press 19'; Bowen (yellow card) 87'	Stadium: Orlando City Stadium; Attendance: 4,640; Referee: Jon Freemon

May 5 5	Houston Dash	1–0	Orlando Pride	Houston, Texas
6:00pm	Ohai 7'	Report	Marta (yellow card) 90+2'	Stadium: BBVA Compass Stadium; Attendance: 4,173; Referee: Victor Rivas

May 11 6	Orlando Pride	1–3	Portland Thorns FC	Orlando, Florida
7:30pm	Pressley 10'; Hill (yellow card) 35'; Pickett (yellow card) 74'	Report	Brynjarsdóttir 28'; Andressinha 36'; Foord 57'; Boureille (yellow card) 61'	Stadium: Orlando City Stadium; Attendance: 4,369; Referee: Marie-Soleil Beaudoin
Note: Play suspended for inclement weather in second half stoppage time

May 25 7	Utah Royals	2–0	Orlando Pride	Sandy, Utah
8:00pm	Rodriguez 31' (pen.); Doniak 89'	Report	Ubogagu (yellow card) 31'; Weatherholt (yellow card) 64'; Callahan (yellow card) 68'	Stadium: Rio Tinto Stadium; Attendance: 7,345; Referee: Karen Abt

June 1 8	Orlando Pride	0–3	North Carolina Courage	Orlando, Florida
7:30pm	Ubogagu (yellow card) 56'	Report	O'Sullivan (yellow card) 53'; Hamilton 59', 66', 85'	Stadium: Orlando City Stadium; Attendance: 4,427; Referee: Eric Tattersall

June 15 9	Houston Dash	2–2	Orlando Pride	Houston, Texas
8:30pm	Brooks (yellow card) 11'; Huerta 47'; Mewis 67'	Report	Boyles 13'; Reid (yellow card) 29'; Viggiano (yellow card) 66'; Evans 71'; Greening (yellow card) 84'	Stadium: BBVA Stadium; Attendance: 3,776; Referee: Samantha Martinez

June 22 10	Sky Blue FC	1–2	Orlando Pride	Piscataway, New Jersey
7:00pm	Killion 67' (pen.); Dydasco (yellow card) 90+3'	Report	Ubogagu 32' (pen.); Lewandowski 81' (o.g.)	Stadium: Yurcak Field; Attendance: 1,644

June 30 11	Orlando Pride	2–3	Chicago Red Stars	Orlando, Florida
5:00pm	Ubogagu 22'; Marta 79' (pen.); Camila (yellow card) 87'	Report	Kerr 7', 45+2', 55'; Colaprico (yellow card) 61'	Stadium: Exploria Stadium; Attendance: 3,906; Referee: Jasmine Peralta
Note: Pride night

July 6 12	Orlando Pride	4–3	Washington Spirit	Orlando, Florida
7:30pm	Ubogagu 21'; Hill 26'; Marta 48', 78'; Pressley (yellow card) 62'	Report	Feist 7'; Matthews 30'; Staab (yellow card) 59'; Dougherty Howard (yellow card) 73'; DiBiasi 90+4'	Stadium: Exploria Stadium; Attendance: 3,703; Referee: Greg Dopka
Note: Kickoff delayed due to inclement weather

July 14 13	Portland Thorns FC	4–3	Orlando Pride	Portland, Oregon
3:00pm	Raso 3'; Purce 58'; Sinclair 66'; Seiler (yellow card) 83'; Lussi 90+4'	Report	Hill (yellow card) 36'; Marta 61'; Menges 68' (o.g.); Greening (yellow card) 69', (goal) 90'; Elinsky (yellow card) 90+2'	Stadium: Providence Park; Attendance: 18,909; Referee: Matt Franz
Note: Televised on ESPNews

July 20 14	Orlando Pride	1–0	Sky Blue FC	Orlando, Florida
7:30pm	Viggiano 23'; Zadorsky (yellow card) 52'; Ubogagu (yellow card) 78'	Report		Stadium: Exploria Stadium; Attendance: 9,415; Referee: Danielle Chesky

August 10 15	Orlando Pride	0–1	Houston Dash	Orlando, Florida
7:30pm	King (red card) 61'; Marta (yellow card) 74' (red card) 85'; Emslie (yellow card) 90+2'	Report	Kizer (yellow card) 82'; Daly 87' (pen.)	Stadium: Exploria Stadium; Attendance: 5,106; Referee: Reyna Fonseca

August 17 16	Orlando Pride	0–2	Utah Royals	Orlando, Florida
7:30pm	Edmonds (yellow card) 63'	Report	Press 60'; Rodriguez 77'	Stadium: Exploria Stadium; Attendance: 5,279; Referee: Malik Badawi

August 21 17	Chicago Red Stars	1–2	Orlando Pride	Bridgeview, Illinois
7:30pm	Davidson 90+6'	Report	Hill 33'; Ubogagu 61'; Krieger (yellow card) 81'; Kennedy (red card) 90'	Stadium: SeatGeek Stadium; Attendance: 5,454; Referee: Rebecca Pagan

August 24 18	Washington Spirit	2–1	Orlando Pride	Washington, D.C.
7:30pm	Nielsen (yellow card) 38'; Thomas 9'; Hatch 59'; Feist (yellow card) 90+1'	Report	Marta 31'; Emslie (yellow card) 90+1'	Stadium: Audi Field; Attendance: 19,470; Referee: Matt Franz

August 31	Orlando Pride	P–P	Washington Spirit	Orlando, Florida
7:30pm				Stadium: Exploria Stadium
Note: Rescheduled to October 5 in anticipation of Hurricane Dorian

September 7 19	Reign FC	3–1	Orlando Pride	Tacoma, Washington
10:00pm	Jenkins 3', 12'; Yanez 17'; Barnes (yellow card) 61'	Report	Camila 79' (pen.)	Stadium: Cheney Stadium; Attendance: 6,668; Referee: Karen Abt

September 11 20	Orlando Pride	0–1	Chicago Red Stars	Orlando, Florida
7:30pm	Emslie (yellow card) 24'	Report	Johnson (yellow card) 39' (yellow-red card) 64'; Short 90+5'	Stadium: Exploria Stadium; Attendance: 4,592; Referee: Elvis Osmanovic
Note: Televised on ESPNews

September 14 21	North Carolina Courage	6–1	Orlando Pride	Cary, North Carolina
7:00pm	Williams 6'; Edmonds 37' (o.g); McDonald 41'; Meehan 78'; O'Reilly 85'; Debinha 90+2'	Report	Greening (yellow card) 11'; Kennedy (yellow card) 28'; Elinsky (yellow card) 28'; Hill 82'	Stadium: WakeMed Soccer Park; Attendance: 9,563; Referee: Natalie Simon

September 29 22	Sky Blue FC	1–1	Orlando Pride	Harrison, New Jersey
11:00am	Monaghan (yellow card) 56'; Lloyd 88'	Report	Zadorsky 18'; Edmonds (yellow card) 42'	Stadium: Red Bull Arena; Attendance: 8,314; Referee: Karen Callado
Note: Moved from Yurcak Field

October 5 23	Orlando Pride	0–3	Washington Spirit	Orlando, Florida
5:00pm	Emslie (yellow card) 71'	Report	Feist (yellow card) 1'; Hatch 5'; Thomas 62'; McCarty 85'	Stadium: Exploria Stadium; Attendance: 6,054; Referee: Tori Penso
Note: Rescheduled from August 31 due to Hurricane Dorian

October 12 24	Orlando Pride	2–2	Reign FC	Orlando, Florida
7:30pm	Hill 24'; Marta (yellow card) 39', (goal) 86'; Elinsky (yellow card) 90+2'	Report	Long (yellow card) 29'; Jenkins 34'; Taylor 41'; McNabb (yellow card) 59'; Celia (yellow card) 89'	Stadium: Exploria Stadium; Attendance: 8,103; Referee: Kevin Broadley
Note: Breast Cancer Awareness match

League standings

Pos	Team	Pld	W	D	L	GF	GA	GD	Pts	Qualification
1	North Carolina Courage (C)	24	15	4	5	54	23	+31	49	NWSL Shield
2	Chicago Red Stars	24	14	2	8	41	28	+13	44	NWSL Playoffs
3	Portland Thorns FC	24	11	7	6	40	31	+9	40	NWSL Playoffs
4	Reign FC	24	10	8	6	27	27	0	38	NWSL Playoffs
5	Washington Spirit	24	9	7	8	30	25	+5	34	
6	Utah Royals FC	24	10	4	10	25	25	0	34	
7	Houston Dash	24	7	5	12	21	36	−15	26	
8	Sky Blue FC	24	5	5	14	20	34	−14	20	
9	Orlando Pride	24	4	4	16	24	53	−29	16	

Source: NWSL
Rules for classification: Tiebreakers
(C) Champions

== Squad statistics ==
=== Appearances ===
As of matches played October 12, 2019

No.	Pos.	Name	NWSL	
No.	Pos.	Name	Apps	Starts
2	FW	(United States) Sydney Leroux	3	0
3	DF	(United States) Toni Pressley	10	9
4	DF	(Canada) Shelina Zadorsky	16	16
5	MF	(Australia) Emily van Egmond	8	7
6	FW	(England) Chioma Ubogagu	17	15
7	FW	(Scotland) Claire Emslie	11	9
8	FW	(United States) Danica Evans	9	4
9	MF	(Brazil) Camila	16	4
10	FW	(Brazil) Marta	14	14
11	DF	(United States) Ali Krieger	12	12
12	DF	(United States) Kristen Edmonds	13	9
13	FW	(United States) Alex Morgan	6	5
14	DF	(Australia) Alanna Kennedy	15	15
15	FW	(United States) Rachel Hill	24	23
16	DF	(United States) Carson Pickett	20	19
17	MF	(United States) Dani Weatherholt	19	16
18	GK	(United States) Lainey Burdett	1	1
19	DF	(United States) Erin Greening	17	16
20	MF	(United States) Abby Elinsky	18	5
21	DF	(United States) Julie King	2	2
22	MF	(United States) Bridget Callahan	8	6
23	MF	(United States) Marisa Viggiano	19	15
24	GK	(United States) Ashlyn Harris	13	13
25	MF	(United States) Joanna Boyles	19	16
26	FW	(United States) Caitlin Farrell	3	0
27	DF	(United States) Morgan Reid	7	7
28	GK	(United States) Haley Kopmeyer	10	10
29	DF	(Jamaica) Alika Keene	0	0
31	MF	(United States) Hana Kerner	0	0
32	DF	(United States) Taylor Porter	0	0

=== Goalscorers ===
As of matches played October 12, 2019

Rank	No.	Pos.	Name	NWSL
1	10	FW	(Brazil) Marta	6
2	6	FW	(England) Chioma Ubogagu	4
2	15	FW	(United States) Rachel Hill	4
4	3	DF	(United States) Toni Pressley	1
4	4	DF	(Canada) Shelina Zadorsky	1
4	8	FW	(United States) Danica Evans	1
4	9	MF	(Brazil) Camila	1
4	14	DF	(Australia) Alanna Kennedy	1
4	19	DF	(United States) Erin Greening	1
4	23	MF	(United States) Marisa Viggiano	1
4	25	MF	(United States) Joanna Boyles	1
Own goal				2
Total				24

=== Shutouts ===
As of matches played October 12, 2019

Rank	No.	Name	NWSL
1	24	(United States) Ashlyn Harris	1
Total			1

=== Disciplinary record ===
As of matches played October 12, 2019

No.	Pos.	Name	NWSL	
No.	Pos.	Name	Booked	Sent off (straight red)
3	DF	(United States) Toni Pressley	1	0
4	DF	(Canada) Shelina Zadorsky	1	0
5	MF	(Australia) Emily van Egmond	1	0
6	FW	(England) Chioma Ubogagu	3	0
7	FW	(Scotland) Claire Emslie	4	0
9	MF	(Brazil) Camila	2	0
10	FW	(Brazil) Marta	4	1
11	DF	(United States) Ali Krieger	1	0
12	DF	(United States) Kristen Edmonds	2	0
13	FW	(United States) Alex Morgan	1	0
14	DF	(Australia) Alanna Kennedy	2	1
15	FW	(United States) Rachel Hill	2	0
16	DF	(United States) Carson Pickett	2	0
17	MF	(United States) Dani Weatherholt	1	0
19	DF	(United States) Erin Greening	3	0
20	MF	(United States) Abby Elinsky	3	0
21	DF	(United States) Julie King	0	1
22	MF	(United States) Bridget Callahan	1	0
23	MF	(United States) Marisa Viggiano	1	0
27	DF	(United States) Morgan Reid	1	0
Total			35	3

== Honors and awards ==
As of October 24, 2019.

=== NWSL Team of the Season ===
Player	Position	Ref.
(United States) Ali Krieger	Defender	

=== NWSL Team of the Month ===
Month	Player	Position	Ref.
July	(Brazil) Marta	Forward	

=== NWSL Weekly Awards ===
NWSL Player of the Week

Week	Result	Player	Ref.
13	Won	(Brazil) Marta	

NWSL Goal of the Week

Week	Result	Player	Ref.
2	Won	(Australia) Alanna Kennedy	
9	Nominated	(United States) Joanna Boyles	
12	Won	(Brazil) Marta	
13	Nominated	(Brazil) Marta	
14	Nominated	(United States) Marisa Viggiano	
19	Nominated	(Brazil) Marta	
22	Nominated	(United States) Rachel Hill	
25	Won	(Brazil) Marta	

NWSL Save of the Week

Week	Result	Player	Ref.
1	Won	(United States) Ashlyn Harris	
2	Nominated	(United States) Ashlyn Harris	
5	Won	(United States) Haley Kopmeyer	
8	Nominated	(United States) Haley Kopmeyer	
9	Won	(United States) Haley Kopmeyer	
10	Won	(United States) Haley Kopmeyer	
11	Won	(United States) Haley Kopmeyer	
12	Nominated	(United States) Haley Kopmeyer	
13	Won	(United States) Haley Kopmeyer	
19	Won	(United States) Ashlyn Harris	
22	Won	(United States) Ashlyn Harris	
24	Won	(United States) Ashlyn Harris	
20 (Note: Match vs. Washington Spirit was originally scheduled in game week 20 but later postponed until October and was the only game played. One save was nominated from each team.)	Won	(United States) Lainey Burdett	
