= 2019 Chicago Red Stars season =

Chicago Red Stars
2019 season
- Owner: Arnim Whisler
- Head coach: Rory Dames
- Stadium: SeatGeek Stadium (capacity: 20,000)
- Top goalscorer: Sam Kerr (18)
- Highest home attendance: 17,388 vs North Carolina Courage, July 21
- Lowest home attendance: 2,113 vs North Carolina Courage, May 11
- Average home league attendance: 7,744
Home colors	Away colors

The 2019 Chicago Red Stars season was the team's eleventh season and seventh season in the National Women's Soccer League, the top tier of women's soccer in the United States.

== First-team squad ==
=== 2019 squad ===
Updated August 12, 2019 Players under contract to play for the club during 2019 season.
bold type indicates player played for her national team.
Note: Flags indicate national team as defined under FIFA eligibility rules; some limited exceptions apply. Players may hold more than one non-FIFA nationality.

No.	Pos.	Nation	Player
1	GK	USA	**Alyssa Naeher**
2	MF	USA	Nikki Stanton
3	DF	USA	Arin Wright
4	MF	USA	Alyssa Mautz
5	DF	USA	Katie Naughton
6	DF	USA	**Casey Short**
7	FW	USA	Michele Vasconcelos
8	MF	USA	**Julie Ertz**
9	FW	USA	**Savannah McCaskill**
10	DF	USA	Vanessa DiBernardo
12	FW	JPN	**Yūki Nagasato**
13	MF	USA	**Morgan Brian**
14	DF	USA	Sarah Gorden

No.	Pos.	Nation	Player
15	MF	MEX	**Maria Sánchez**
16	GK	USA	Alison Jahansouz
18	GK	AUS	**Mackenzie Arnold**
20	FW	AUS	**Sam Kerr**
21	GK	USA	Emily Boyd
23	MF	USA	Brooke Elby
24	MF	USA	**Danielle Colaprico**
28	DF	USA	Zoey Goralski
26	DF	USA	**Tierna Davidson**
28	DF	USA	Kayla Sharples
30	DF	USA	Hannah Davison
31	DF	USA	Jenna Szczesny
33	FW	MEX	**Katie Johnson**

== Player transactions ==
=== 2019 NWSL College Draft ===
Round	Pick	Nat.	Player	Pos.	Previous Team
Round 1	1	(United States)	Tierna Davidson	D	Stanford University
Round 2	15	(Mexico)	María Sánchez	F	Santa Clara University
Round 3	20	(Canada)	Bianca St. Georges	F	West Virginia University
Round 3	26	(United States)	Kayla Sharples	D	Northwestern University
Round 4	28	(United States)	April Bockin	F	University of Minnesota
Round 4	33	(United States)	Hannah Davison	D	Northwestern University
Round 4	35	(United States)	Jenna Szczesny	F	Loyola University Chicago

=== In ===
Date	Player	Positions played	Previous club	Fee/notes	Ref.
January 9, 2019	(Mexico) Katie Johnson	FW	Sky Blue FC	Acquired in a Trade with Sky Blue FC for the 6th Overall Pick in the 2019 NWSL College Draft and Chicago's highest second round pick in 2020	
June 19, 2019	(United States) Savannah McCaskill	FW	Sky Blue FC	Acquired in a Trade with Sky Blue FC for a First and Second Round Pick at the 2020 NWSL College Draft	
August 1, 2019	(Australia) Mackenzie Arnold	GK	(Norway) Arna-Bjørnar	Signed.	

=== Out ===
Date	Player	Positions played	Destination club	Fee/notes	Ref.
January 7, 2019	(United States) Summer Green	FW	(Sweden) Vittsjö	Signed with Vittsjö	
March 2, 2019	(New Zealand) Rosie White	MF	Reign FC	Left team to focus on preparing for the 2019 FIFA Women's World Cup with New Zealand.	
March 3, 2019	(United States) Stephanie McCaffrey	FW		Retired.	

== Management and staff ==
Front Office

- Owner: Arnim Whisler

Coaching Staff

- Manager: Rory Dames
- Assistant coach: Craig Harrington
- Assistant coach: Gary Curneen
- Goalkeeper coach: Jordi King
- Strength & Conditioning Coach: Evan Johnson
- Volunteer Assistant Coach: Brian Kibler

== Competitions ==
=== League standing ===
Pos	Team	Pld	W	D	L	GF	GA	GD	Pts	Qualification
1	North Carolina Courage (C)	24	15	4	5	54	23	+31	49	NWSL Shield
2	Chicago Red Stars	24	14	2	8	41	28	+13	44	NWSL Playoffs
3	Portland Thorns FC	24	11	7	6	40	31	+9	40	NWSL Playoffs
4	Reign FC	24	10	8	6	27	27	0	38	NWSL Playoffs
5	Washington Spirit	24	9	7	8	30	25	+5	34	
6	Utah Royals FC	24	10	4	10	25	25	0	34	
7	Houston Dash	24	7	5	12	21	36	−15	26	
8	Sky Blue FC	24	5	5	14	20	34	−14	20	
9	Orlando Pride	24	4	4	16	24	53	−29	16	

Source: NWSL
Rules for classification: Tiebreakers
(C) Champions

==== Results summary ====
Overall								Home						Away					
Pld	W	D	L	GF	GA	GD	Pts	W	D	L	GF	GA	GD	W	D	L	GF	GA	GD
24	14	2	8	41	28	+13	44	7	1	4	24	15	+9	7	1	4	17	13	+4

==== Results by round ====
Round	1	2	3	4	5	6	7	8	9	10	11	12	13	14	15	16	17	18	19	20	21	22	23	24
Stadium	A	H	H	A	H	A	H	A	H	A	H	A	H	A	H	A	A	H	A	H	A	A	H	H
Result	D	D	W	L	W	W	L	L	L	W	L	W	W	W	W	W	L	L	L	W	W	W	W	W
Position	4	7	3	5	3	1	4	4	7	6	6	6	3	3	3	2	2	3	3	3	3	2	2	2

Updated to match(es) played on September 29, 2019. Source: NWSLsoccer.com
A = Away; H = Home; W = Win; D = Draw; L = Loss

=== Weekly schedule ===
Win Tie Loss

All times are in Central Time unless otherwise noted.

==== Preseason ====
Sat., Mar. 9 Closed door scrimmage	Chicago Red Stars	––	Missouri Tigers	Bridgeview, Illinois
14:00				Stadium: SeatGeek Stadium
Note: Closed door scrimmage

Sun., Mar. 24 Thorns Spring Invitational	Portland Thorns FC	2–1	Chicago Red Stars	Portland, Oregon
17:00	Lussi 6'; Horan 74'		Sharples 54'	Stadium: Merlo Field

Wed., Mar. 27 Thorns Spring Invitational	Reign FC	2–1	Chicago Red Stars	Portland, Oregon
13:30	Andrews 38'; Nielsen 64'		Johnson 5'	Stadium: Merlo Field

Sat., Mar. 30 Thorns Spring Invitational	United States U-23	2–1	Chicago Red Stars	Portland, Oregon
13:30	Fox 29'; Foster 90+2'		Kerr 14'	Stadium: Merlo Field

==== Regular season ====
Sat., Apr. 13 1	North Carolina Courage	1–1	Chicago Red Stars	Cary, North Carolina
18:00	Dunn 66'	Report	Kerr 26'	Stadium: WakeMed Soccer Park; Attendance: 4,053

Sat., Apr. 20 2	Chicago Red Stars	4–4	Portland Thorns FC	Bridgeview, Illinois
14:30	Nagasato 18' (pen.), 90+1'; Kerr 20'; Vasconcelos 78'	Report	Sinclair 16', 51', 87' (pen.); Crnogorčević 33'	Stadium: SeatGeek Stadium; Attendance: 12,967; Referee: Karen Abt

Sat., Apr. 27 3	Chicago Red Stars	3–0	Reign FC	Bridgeview, Illinois
19:00	Short 13'; Nagasato 53'; Elby 90'			Stadium: SeatGeek Stadium; Attendance: 2,804
Note: Game played at 12pm on Sunday, April 28 due to poor field conditions

Fri., May 3 4	Utah Royals FC	1–0	Chicago Red Stars	Sandy, Utah
7:00 pm MST	Maemone (yellow card) 66' Rodriguez 83'	Report	K.Johnson (red card) 42' Stanton (yellow card) 66' Kerr (yellow card) 80'	Stadium: Rio Tinto Stadium; Attendance: 16,556

Sun., May 12 5	Chicago Red Stars	3–1	North Carolina Courage	Bridgeview, Illinois
17:00	Kerr 13' 90+3'; Vasconcelos 40'; Stanton (yellow card) 72'	Report	Williams 33'; Williams (yellow card) 80'	Stadium: SeatGeek Stadium; Attendance: 2,113

Sun., May 19 6	Houston Dash	1–2	Chicago Red Stars	Houston, Texas
17:00	Huerta 26'; Murray (yellow card) 54'	Box	Kerr 8' 13'; Stanton (yellow card) 49'	Stadium: BBVA Compass Stadium; Attendance: 3,690

Sun., May 26 7	Chicago Red Stars	0–2	Washington Spirit	Bridgeview, Illinois
17:00	Johnson (yellow card) 90+3'	Box	Nagasato 9' (o.g.) Dougherty Howard (yellow card) 16' Hatch 63'	Stadium: SeatGeek Stadium; Attendance: 3,447

Sun., June 2 8	Portland Thorns FC	3–0	Chicago Red Stars	Portland, Oregon
17:00	Purce 27', 31'; Ball (yellow card) 37'; Everett 85'	*Box	Short (yellow card) 66'	Stadium: Providence Park; Attendance: 19,461; Referee: Victor Rivas

Sun., June 23 9	Chicago Red Stars	0–1	Reign FC	Bridgeview, Illinois
17:00	Stanton (yellow card) 29'	Box	Fishlock 80'; Barnes (yellow card) 90+3'	Stadium: SeatGeek Stadium; Attendance: 2,023

Sun., June 30 10	Orlando Pride	2–3	Chicago Red Stars	Orlando, Florida
16:00	Ubogagu 22'; Marta 79' (pen.); Camila (yellow card) 87'	Report	Kerr 7', 45+2', 55'; Colaprico (yellow card) 61'	Stadium: Exploria Stadium; Attendance: 3,906

Sat., July 6 11	Chicago Red Stars	1–2	Sky Blue FC	Bridgeview, Illinois
19:00	Colaprico 83'		Rodriguez 23'; Hoy 81'	Stadium: SeatGeek Stadium

Sat., July 13 12	Houston Dash	0–1	Chicago Red Stars	Houston, Texas
19:30	Hanson (yellow card) 77'		Johnson 7'; Stanton (yellow card) 66'	Stadium: BBVA Compass Stadium; Attendance: 5,327

Sun., July 21 13	Chicago Red Stars	2–1	North Carolina Courage	Bridgeview, Illinois
17:00	Naughton (yellow card) 14'; DiBernardo 37'; Kerr 58'		Williams 30'; McDonald (yellow card) 51'	Stadium: SeatGeek Stadium; Attendance: 17,388
Note: Game was broadcast on ESPN 2

Sun., July 28 14	Reign FC	0–4	Chicago Red Stars	Tacoma, Washington
15:00	Barnes (yellow card) 34'	Box; Report	Wright 4'; DiBernardo 14'; Nagasato 51'; Ertz (yellow card) 59'; Kerr 81'	Stadium: Cheney Stadium; Attendance: 7,479

Sat., Aug. 3 15	Chicago Red Stars	2–0	Utah Royals FC	Bridgeview, Illinois
19:00	Kerr 5'; Elby 85'		Jónsdóttir (yellow card) 74'	Stadium: SeatGeek Stadium; Attendance: 4,335

Sat., Aug. 10 16	Washington Spirit	0–1	Chicago Red Stars	Boyds, Maryland
18:00	Sullivan (yellow card) 13'; Lavelle (yellow card) 64'		Colaprico (yellow card) 46'; Nagasato 65'	Stadium: Maryland SoccerPlex; Attendance: 5,300

Wed., Aug. 14 17	Sky Blue FC	2–1	Chicago Red Stars	Piscataway, New Jersey
18:00	Monaghan 71', 90+3'; Wright (yellow card) 56'	Report	Kerr 90+1'; Nagasato (yellow card) 62'; Naughton (yellow card) 64'	Stadium: Yurcak Field; Attendance: 2,558; Referee: Thomas Snyder

Wed., Aug. 21 18	Chicago Red Stars	1–2	Orlando Pride	Bridgeview, Illinois
18:30	Davidson 90+6'	Report	Hill 33'; Ubogagu 61'; Krieger (yellow card) 81'; Kennedy (red card) 90'	Stadium: SeatGeek Stadium

Sun., Aug. 25 19	Portland Thorns FC	3–0	Chicago Red Stars	Portland, Oregon
14:00	Sinclair 12'; Purce 24', 56'; Heath (yellow card) 70'		Stanton (yellow card) 63'; Nagasato (yellow card) 84'	Stadium: Providence Park; Attendance: 17,542

Sun., Sep. 8 20	Chicago Red Stars	3–0	Houston Dash	Bridgeview, Illinois
17:00	Kerr 7', 44'; McCaskill 65'; Nagasato (yellow card) 90'		Agnew (yellow card) 40'	Stadium: SeatGeek Stadium; Attendance: 3,345

Wed., Sep. 11 21	Orlando Pride	0–1	Chicago Red Stars	Orlando, Florida
18:30	Emslie (yellow card) 24'	Report	Johnson (yellow card) 39' (yellow-red card) 64'; Short 90+5'	Stadium: Exploria Stadium; Attendance: 4,592; Referee: Elvis Osmanovic
Note: Televised on ESPNews

Sun., Sep. 15 22	Sky Blue FC	0–3	Chicago Red Stars	Piscataway, New Jersey
16:00	Rodriguez (yellow card) 78'		Brian 31'; Kerr 33'; Nagasato 80'	Stadium: Yurcak Field; Attendance: 2,871

Sat., Sep. 21 23	Chicago Red Stars	3–1	Washington Spirit	Bridgeview, Illinois
19:00	Kerr 9', 49'; Nagasato 23'		Nielsen (yellow card) 53'; Staab (yellow card) 62'; Daugherty Howard (yellow card) 65'; Pugh 80'	Stadium: SeatGeek Stadium; Attendance: 4,317

Sat., Sep. 28 24	Chicago Red Stars	2–1	Utah Royals FC	Bridgeview, Illinois
19:00	DiBernardo 40'; Short (yellow card) 67'; Nagasato 85'		Press 42'	Stadium: Toyota Park; Attendance: 4,839

==== Postseason playoffs ====
October 20 Semifinal	Chicago Red Stars	1–0	Portland Thorns FC	Bridgeview, Illinois
2:30 p.m. CDT	Kerr 8'	Report	Ball (yellow card) 45+1'	Stadium: SeatGeek Stadium
Note: Televised on ESPN2

October 27 Final	North Carolina Courage	4–0	Chicago Red Stars	Cary, North Carolina
4:30 p.m. EST				Stadium: Sahlen's Stadium at WakeMed Soccer Park

== Statistical leaders ==
As of September 28, 2019 *Denotes League Leader

=== Top scorers ===
Rank	Player	Goals
1	(Australia) Sam Kerr	18 *
2	(Japan) Yuki Nagasato	7
3	(United States) Vanessa DiBernardo	3
4	(United States) Michele Vasconcelos	2
4	(United States) Brooke Elby	2
4	(United States) Casey Short	2
7	(United States) Danielle Colaprico	1
7	(Mexico) Katie Johnson	1
7	(United States) Arin Wright	1
7	(United States) Tierna Davidson	1
7	(United States) Savannah McCaskill	1
7	(United States) Morgan Brian	1

=== Top assists ===
Rank	Player	Assists
1	(Japan) Yuki Nagasato	8 *
2	(Australia) Sam Kerr	5
3	(United States) Michele Vasconcelos	3
3	(United States) Casey Short	3
3	(Mexico) Katie Johnson	3
6	(United States) Vanessa DiBernardo	2
7	(United States) Julie Ertz	1
7	(United States) Arin Wright	1
7	(United States) Savannah McCaskill	1
7	(United States) Morgan Brian	1
7	(United States) Zoey Goralski	1

=== Shutouts ===
Rank	Player	Clean sheets
1	(United States) Alyssa Naeher	6
2	(United States) Emily Boyd	2

== Honors and awards ==
As of October 3, 2019.

=== NWSL Monthly Award ===
==== NWSL Player of the Month ====
Month	Result	Player	Ref.
May	Won	(Australia) Sam Kerr	
September	Won	(Australia) Sam Kerr	

==== NWSL Team of the Month ====
Month	Goalkeeper	Defenders	Midfielders	Forwards	Ref
April		(United States) Casey Short	(Japan) Yuki Nagasato	(Australia) Sam Kerr	
May		(United States) Casey Short	(Japan) Yuki Nagasato	(Australia) Sam Kerr	
June		(United States) Casey Short			
July		(United States) Casey Short (United States) Sarah Gorden	(United States) Vanessa DiBernardo	(Australia) Sam Kerr	
August		(United States) Casey Short			
September	(United States) Alyssa Naeher	(United States) Casey Short (United States) Julie Ertz	(United States) Morgan Brian	(Japan) Yuki Nagasato (Australia) Sam Kerr	

=== NWSL Weekly Awards ===
==== NWSL Player of the Week ====
Week	Result	Player	Ref.
3	Won	(Japan) Yuki Nagasato	
5	Won	(Australia) Sam Kerr	
6	Won	(Australia) Sam Kerr	
11	Won	(Australia) Sam Kerr	
14	Won	(Australia) Sam Kerr	
16	Won	(Australia) Sam Kerr	
23	Won	(Australia) Sam Kerr	

==== NWSL Goal of the Week ====
Week	Result	Player	Ref.
3	Nominated	(Japan) Yuki Nagasato	
5	Nominated	(Australia) Sam Kerr	
11	Nominated	(Australia) Sam Kerr	
14	Nominated	(Australia) Sam Kerr	
15	Nominated	(Japan) Yuki Nagasato	
16	Won	(Australia) Sam Kerr	

==== NWSL Save of the Week ====
Week	Result	Player	Ref.
1	Nominated	(United States) Alyssa Naeher	
2	Nominated	(United States) Alyssa Naeher	
5	Nominated	(United States) Emily Boyd	
6	Nominated	(United States) Emily Boyd	
11	Nominated	(United States) Emily Boyd	
14	Nominated	(United States) Alyssa Naeher	
15	Nominated	(United States) Alyssa Naeher	
