= 2019 National Women's Soccer League season =

Seventh season of the National Women's Soccer League

National Women's Soccer League
- Season: 2019
- Champions: North Carolina Courage
- NWSL Shield: North Carolina Courage
- Matches: 108
- Goals: 282 (2.61 per match)
- Top goalscorer: Sam Kerr (18) (NWSL Record)
- Biggest home win: NCC 5–0 ORL (April 17); POR 5–0 HOU (July 24)
- Biggest away win: POR 0–6 NCC (September 11)
- Highest scoring: CHI 4–4 POR (April 20)
- Longest winning run: 5 games Chicago Red Stars (July 13 – August 10)
- Longest unbeaten run: 7 games Washington Spirit (May 4 – July 6)
- Longest winless run: 9 games Orlando Pride (April 14 – June 15); Sky Blue FC (April 13 – July 6)
- Longest losing run: 5 games Orlando Pride (April 27 – June 1); Sky Blue FC (May 11 – July 6)
- Highest attendance: 25,218; POR 2–1 NCC (August 11)
- Lowest attendance: 1,321; SKY 2–2 POR (April 28)
- Total attendance: 798,056
- Average attendance: 7,389
- All statistics correct as of October 12, 2019.

The 2019 National Women's Soccer League season was the seventh season of the National Women's Soccer League, the top division of women's soccer in the United States. Including the NWSL's two professional predecessors, Women's Professional Soccer (2009–2011) and the Women's United Soccer Association (2001–2003), it was the thirteenth overall season of FIFA and USSF-sanctioned top division women's soccer in the United States.

The league is operated by the United States Soccer Federation and receives major financial backing from that body. Further financial backing is provided by the Canadian Soccer Association. Both national federations pay the league salaries of many of their respective national team members in an effort to nurture talent in those nations and take the financial burden of individual clubs.

== Teams, stadiums, and personnel ==
=== Stadiums and locations ===
The Dash does not make its stadium's entire capacity available for home games, instead restricting ticket sales at a lower level. The full capacity of this venue is included in parentheses and italics.

Two stadiums were renamed during the season. First, on June 4, Exploria Resorts acquired the naming rights to Orlando City Stadium, which was accordingly renamed Exploria Stadium. Then, on June 13, the U.S. arm of the Spanish multinational bank BBVA announced a rebranding of the U.S. operations from "BBVA Compass" to "BBVA". As part of the rebranding, BBVA Compass Stadium became simply BBVA Stadium.

Team	Stadium	Capacity
Chicago Red Stars	SeatGeek Stadium	20,000
Houston Dash	BBVA Stadium	7,000 (22,039)
North Carolina Courage	Sahlen's Stadium at WakeMed Soccer Park	10,000
Orlando Pride	Exploria Stadium	25,500
Portland Thorns	Providence Park	25,218
Reign FC	Cheney Stadium	6,500
Sky Blue FC	Yurcak Field (Note: Sky Blue played two home games at Red Bull Arena (capacity 25,000).)	5,000
Utah Royals FC	Rio Tinto Stadium	20,213
Washington Spirit	Maryland SoccerPlex (Note: The Spirit played two home games at Audi Field (capacity 20,000).)	4,000

Locations of the National Women's Soccer League teams in 2019.

=== Personnel and sponsorship ===
Note: All teams use Nike as their kit manufacturer.

Team	Head coach	Shirt sponsor
Chicago Red Stars	(United States) Rory Dames	—
Houston Dash	(England) James Clarkson	—
North Carolina Courage	(England) Paul Riley	Continental AG
Orlando Pride	(England) Marc Skinner	Orlando Health
Portland Thorns	(England) Mark Parsons	Providence Health & Services
Reign FC	(North Macedonia) Vlatko Andonovski	Zulily
Sky Blue FC	(England) Freya Coombe (interim)	Meridian Health
Utah Royals FC	(England) Laura Harvey	Conservice
Washington Spirit	(England) Richie Burke	GEICO

=== Coaching changes ===
Team	Outgoing manager	Manner of departure	Date of vacancy	Incoming manager	Date of appointment	Ref.
Washington Spirit	(United States) Tom Torres	End of interim period	September 2, 2018	(England) Richie Burke	January 8, 2019	
Orlando Pride	(Scotland) Tom Sermanni	Mutual separation	September 14, 2018	(England) Marc Skinner	January 14, 2019	
Houston Dash	(Netherlands) Vera Pauw	Mutual separation	September 20, 2018	(England) James Clarkson	December 11, 2018	
Sky Blue FC	(United States) Denise Reddy	Fired	June 28, 2019	(England) Freya Coombe (interim)	September 4, 2019	

== League standings ==
Pos	Team	Pld	W	D	L	GF	GA	GD	Pts	Qualification
1	North Carolina Courage (C)	24	15	4	5	54	23	+31	49	NWSL Shield
2	Chicago Red Stars	24	14	2	8	41	28	+13	44	NWSL Playoffs
3	Portland Thorns FC	24	11	7	6	40	31	+9	40	NWSL Playoffs
4	Reign FC	24	10	8	6	27	27	0	38	NWSL Playoffs
5	Washington Spirit	24	9	7	8	30	25	+5	34	
6	Utah Royals FC	24	10	4	10	25	25	0	34	
7	Houston Dash	24	7	5	12	21	36	−15	26	
8	Sky Blue FC	24	5	5	14	20	34	−14	20	
9	Orlando Pride	24	4	4	16	24	53	−29	16	

Source: NWSL
Rules for classification: Tiebreakers
(C) Champions

=== Tiebreakers ===
The initial determining factor for a team's position in the standings is most points earned, with three points earned for a win, one point for a draw, and zero points for a loss. If two or more teams tie in point total, when determining rank and playoff qualification and seeding, the NWSL uses the following tiebreaker rules, going down the list until all teams are ranked.

1. Head-to-head win–loss record between the teams (or points per game if more than two teams).
2. Greater goal difference across the entire season (against all teams, not just tied teams).
3. Greatest total number of goals scored (against all teams).
4. Apply #1–3 to games played on the road.
5. Apply #1–3 to games played at home.
6. If teams are still equal, ranking will be determined by a coin toss.

NOTE: If two clubs remain tied after another club with the same number of points advances during any step, the tiebreaker reverts to step 1 of the two-club format.

== Attendance ==
=== Average home attendances ===
Ranked from highest to lowest average attendance.

Team	GP	Attendance	High	Low	Average
Portland Thorns FC	12	241,181	25,218	15,581	20,098
Utah Royals FC	12	129,288	18,015	5,777	10,774
Washington Spirit	12	73,661	19,871	2,097	6,138
North Carolina Courage	12	70,496	9,563	4,053	5,875
Orlando Pride	12	66,783	9,415	3,703	5,565
Chicago Red Stars	12	65,406	17,388	2,023	5,451
Reign FC	12	62,551	7,479	3,032	5,213
Houston Dash	12	48,631	5,327	2,933	4,053
Sky Blue FC	12	40,059	9,415	1,321	3,338
Total	108	798,056	25,218	1,321	7,389

Updated through end of regular season on October 12, 2019.

=== Highest attendances ===
Regular season

Rank	Home team	Score	Away team	Attendance	Date	Stadium
1	Portland Thorns FC	2–1	North Carolina Courage	25,218	August 11, 2019	Providence Park
2	Portland Thorns FC	0–0	Washington Spirit	24,521	October 12, 2019	Providence Park
3	Portland Thorns FC	5–0	Houston Dash	22,329	July 24, 2019	Providence Park
4	Portland Thorns FC	1–0	Houston Dash	21,022	September 21, 2019	Providence Park
5	Portland Thorns FC	3–1	Washington Spirit	20,895	August 17, 2019	Providence Park
6	Washington Spirit	2–1	Orlando Pride	19,871	August 24, 2019	Audi Field
7	Portland Thorns FC	3–0	Chicago Red Stars	19,461	June 2, 2019	Providence Park
8	Portland Thorns FC	0–1	Reign FC	19,116	July 5, 2019	Providence Park
9	Portland Thorns FC	1–1	Sky Blue FC	19,070	August 3, 2019	Providence Park
10	Portland Thorns FC	4–3	Orlando Pride	18,909	July 14, 2019	Providence Park

Updated through end of regular season on October 12, 2019.

== Statistical leaders ==
As of October 12, 2019

=== Top scorers ===
Rank	Player	Club	Goals
1	(Australia) Sam Kerr	Chicago Red Stars	18
2	(United States) Lynn Williams	North Carolina Courage	12
3	(United States) Kristen Hamilton	North Carolina Courage	9
3	(Canada) Christine Sinclair	Portland Thorns FC	9
3	(United States) Amy Rodriguez	Utah Royals FC	9
6	(Japan) Yuki Nagasato	Chicago Red Stars	8
6	(Brazil) Debinha	North Carolina Courage	8
6	(United States) Margaret Purce	Portland Thorns FC	8
6	(United States) Carli Lloyd	Sky Blue FC	8
6	(United States) Christen Press	Utah Royals FC	8

=== Top assists ===
Rank	Player	Club	Assists
1	(Japan) Yuki Nagasato	Chicago Red Stars	8
2	(Brazil) Debinha	North Carolina Courage	7
3	(United States) Jaelene Hinkle	North Carolina Courage	6
3	(Spain) Veronica Boquete	Utah Royals FC	6
5	(Australia) Sam Kerr	Chicago Red Stars	5
5	(United States) Kristen Hamilton	North Carolina Courage	5
5	(United States) Merritt Mathias	North Carolina Courage	5
5	(United States) Lynn Williams	North Carolina Courage	5
9	(United States) Crystal Dunn	North Carolina Courage	4
9	(United States) Sofia Huerta	Houston Dash	4
9	(United States) Meghan Klingenberg	Portland Thorns FC	4
9	(Iceland) Gunnhildur Jónsdóttir	Utah Royals FC	4

=== Shutouts ===
Rank	Player	Club	Clean sheets
1	(United States) Nicole Barnhart	Utah Royals FC	10
2	(United States) Aubrey Bledsoe	Washington Spirit	9
3	(Canada) Stephanie Labbe	North Carolina Courage	8
4	(United States) Alyssa Naeher	Chicago Red Stars	6
4	(United States) Jane Campbell	Houston Dash	6
4	(United States) Casey Murphy	Reign FC	6
7	(United States) Adrianna Franch	Portland Thorns FC	5
8	(United States) Britt Eckerstrom	Portland Thorns FC	3
8	(Canada) Kailen Sheridan	Sky Blue FC	3
10	(United States) Emily Boyd	Chicago Red Stars	2

=== Hat-tricks ===
To date, 2019 had the most hat-tricks in a single NWSL season, with five.

Player	For	Against	Score	Date
(Canada) Christine Sinclair	Portland Thorns FC	Chicago Red Stars	4−4	April 20
(United States) Kristen Hamilton	North Carolina Courage	Orlando Pride	3−0	June 1
(Australia) Sam Kerr	Chicago Red Stars	Orlando Pride	2−3	June 30
(United States) Kristen Hamilton^{4}	North Carolina Courage	Houston Dash	5−2	July 5
(United States) Lynn Williams	North Carolina Courage	Portland Thorns FC	6−0	September 11

^{4} Scored 4 goals

== NWSL Playoffs ==
The top four teams from the regular season compete for the NWSL Championship. The North Carolina Courage secured the number one seed on September 21, winning their third straight NWSL Shield.

Semi-finals
1	North Carolina Courage	4
4	Reign FC	1
2	Chicago Red Stars	1
3	Portland Thorns FC	0

Championship
1	North Carolina Courage	4
2	Chicago Red Stars	0

=== Semi-finals ===
October 20, 2019
1:30pm (EDT)

North Carolina Courage	4–1 (a.e.t.)	Reign FC
O'Reilly 88' (pen.); Debinha 99'; Barnes 106' (o.g.); Dunn 107'	Report	Long (yellow card) 50'; Onumonu 90+3'

Sahlen’s Stadium at WakeMed Soccer Park
Cary, North Carolina
Attendance: 7,422
Referee: Tori Penso
October 20, 2019
2:30pm (CDT)

Chicago Red Stars	1–0	Portland Thorns FC
Kerr 8'	Report	Ball (yellow card) 45+1'

SeatGeek Stadium
Bridgeview, Illinois
Attendance: 9,218
Referee: Danielle Chesky

=== Championship ===
October 27, 2019
4:00pm (EDT)

North Carolina Courage	4–0	Chicago Red Stars
Debinha 8'; McDonald 26'; Dunn 45+5'; Mewis 61'; Zerboni (yellow card) 74'	Report	DiBernardo (yellow card) 47'; Ertz (yellow card) 67'

Sahlen’s Stadium at WakeMed Soccer Park
Cary, North Carolina
Attendance: 10,227
Referee: Rosendo Mendoza

== Individual awards ==
As of October 16, 2019

=== Monthly Awards ===
==== Player of the Month ====
Month	Player of the Month		Club	Month's Statline
April	(United States)	Crystal Dunn	North Carolina Courage	4 Goals in three games, 2 Assists and 3 chances created.
May	(Australia)	Sam Kerr	Chicago Red Stars	4 Goals in three games.
June	(Wales)	Jess Fishlock	Reign FC	3 Goals in three games. 1 Assist, 8 shots, and 7 chances created.
July	(United States)	Kristen Hamilton	North Carolina Courage	4 goals in a single match. 5 goals and 2 assists in July.
August	(United States)	Christen Press	Utah Royals FC	3 Goals, 13 shots on goal, 12 chances created.
September	(Australia)	Sam Kerr	Chicago Red Stars	5 Goals, 14 shots on goal, 3 assists.

==== Team of the Month ====
Month	Goalkeeper	Defenders	Midfielders	Forwards	Ref
April	(Canada) Kailen Sheridan, NJ	(United States) Casey Short, CHI (United States) Becky Sauerbrunn, UTA (New Zealand) Abby Erceg, NC (United States) Meghan Klingenberg, POR	(Canada) Christine Sinclair, POR (Japan) Yuki Nagasato, CHI (United States) Crystal Dunn, NC	(United States) Christen Press, UTA (Australia) Sam Kerr, CHI (United States) Tobin Heath, POR	
May	(United States) Aubrey Bledsoe, WAS	(United States) Casey Short, CHI (Scotland) Rachel Corsie, UTA (United States) Sam Staab, WAS (United States) Merritt Mathias, NC	(Japan) Yuki Nagasato, CHI (United States) Jordan DiBiasi, WAS (Spain) Vero Boquete, UTA	(Australia) Sam Kerr, CHI (United States) Amy Rodriguez, UTA (United States) Ashley Hatch, WAS	
June	(United States) Aubrey Bledsoe, WAS	(United States) Casey Short, CHI (United States) Sam Staab, WAS (United States) Megan Oyster, RFC (United States) Katherine Reynolds, POR	(United States) Andi Sullivan, WAS (Wales) Jess Fishlock, RFC (United States) Kristen Hamilton, NC	(United States) Midge Purce, POR (United States) Amy Rodriguez, UTA (United States) Ifeoma Onumonu, RFC	
July	(Canada) Kailen Sheridan, NJ	(United States) Casey Short, CHI (United States) Sarah Gorden, CHI (New Zealand) Abby Erceg, NC (United States) Merritt Mathias, NC	(United States) Vanessa DiBernardo, CHI (Brazil) Debinha, NC (United States) Gabby Seiler, POR	(United States) Kristen Hamilton, NC (Australia) Sam Kerr, CHI (Brazil) Marta, ORL	
August	(United States) Aubrey Bledsoe, WAS	(United States) Jaelene Hinkle, NC (United States) Emily Menges, POR (New Zealand) Abby Erceg, NC (United States) Casey Short, CHI	(Brazil) Debinha, NC (Canada) Christine Sinclair, POR (United States) Lo'eau LaBonta, UTA	(United States) Midge Purce, POR (United States) Christen Press, UTA (United States) Amy Rodriguez, UTA	
September	(United States) Alyssa Naeher, CHI	(United States) Jaelene Hinkle, NC (United States) Lauren Barnes, RFC (United States) Julie Ertz, CHI (United States) Casey Short, CHI	(United States) Beverly Yanez, RFC (Brazil) Debinha, NC (United States) Morgan Brian, CHI	(Japan) Yuki Nagasato, CHI (Australia) Sam Kerr, CHI (United States) Lynn Williams, NC	

=== Weekly awards ===
Week	Player of the Week		Goal of the Week		Save of the Week		Reference
Week	Player	Club	Player	Club	Player	Club	Reference
1	(United States) Tobin Heath	Portland Thorns FC	(United States) Tobin Heath	Portland Thorns FC	(United States) Ashlyn Harris	Orlando Pride	
2	(Canada) Christine Sinclair	Portland Thorns FC	(Australia) Alanna Kennedy	Orlando Pride	(Canada) Kailen Sheridan	Sky Blue FC	
3	(Japan) Yuki Nagasato	Chicago Red Stars	(United States) Tobin Heath	Portland Thorns FC	(Canada) Kailen Sheridan	Sky Blue FC	
4	(United States) Aubrey Bledsoe	Washington Spirit	(United States) Kealia Ohai	Houston Dash	(United States) Aubrey Bledsoe	Washington Spirit	
5	(Australia) Sam Kerr	Chicago Red Stars	(Brazil) Andressinha	Portland Thorns	(United States) Haley Kopmeyer	Orlando Pride	
6	(Australia) Sam Kerr	Chicago Red Stars	(United States) Jordan DiBiasi	Washington Spirit	Honorary (United States) Morgan Andrews; Winner (United States) Britt Eckerstrom	Reign FC Portland Thorns	
7	(United States) Aubrey Bledsoe	Washington Spirit	(United States) Bethany Balcer	Reign FC	(United States) Paige Nielsen	Washington Spirit	
8	(United States) Kristen Hamilton	North Carolina Courage	(United States) Margaret Purce	Portland Thorns	(United States) Jane Campbell	Houston Dash	
9	(Wales) Jess Fishlock	Reign FC	(United States) Amy Rodriguez	Utah Royals FC	(United States) Haley Kopmeyer	Orlando Pride	
10	(United States) Ifeoma Onumonu	Reign FC	(Wales) Jess Fishlock	Reign FC	(United States) Haley Kopmeyer	Orlando Pride	
11	(Australia) Sam Kerr	Chicago Red Stars	(United States) Tyler Lussi	Portland Thorns	(United States) Haley Kopmeyer	Orlando Pride	
12	(United States) Kristen Hamilton	North Carolina Courage	(Brazil) Marta	Orlando Pride	(United States) Aubrey Bledsoe	Washington Spirit	
13	(Brazil) Marta	Orlando Pride	(United States) Tyler Lussi	Portland Thorns	(United States) Haley Kopmeyer	Orlando Pride	
14	(Australia) Sam Kerr	Chicago Red Stars	(United States) Christen Press	Utah Royals FC	(United States) Adrianna Franch	Portland Thorns FC	
15	(United States) Kristen Hamilton	North Carolina Courage	(United States) Christen Press	Utah Royals FC	(United States) Jane Campbell	Houston Dash	
16	(Australia) Sam Kerr	Chicago Red Stars	(Australia) Sam Kerr	Chicago Red Stars	(United States) Aubrey Bledsoe	Washington Spirit	
17	(United States) Christen Press	Utah Royals FC	(United States) Amy Rodriguez	Utah Royals FC	(United States) Adrianna Franch	Portland Thorns FC	
18	(United States) Paige Monaghan	Sky Blue FC	(United States) Christen Press	Utah Royals FC	(Canada) Kailen Sheridan	Sky Blue FC	
19	(United States) Midge Purce	Portland Thorns FC	(United States) Kealia Ohai	Houston Dash	(United States) Ashlyn Harris	Orlando Pride	
20	(United States) Crystal Thomas	Washington Spirit	(United States) Tiffany McCarty	Washington Spirit	(United States) Lainey Burdett	Orlando Pride	
21	(United States) Darian Jenkins	Reign FC	(United States) Becky Sauerbrunn	Utah Royals FC	(United States) Nicole Barnhart	Utah Royals FC	
22	(United States) Lynn Williams	North Carolina Courage	(United States) Heather O'Reilly	North Carolina Courage	(United States) Ashlyn Harris	Orlando Pride	
23	(Australia) Sam Kerr	Chicago Red Stars	(United States) Tobin Heath	Portland Thorns FC	(United States) Alyssa Naeher	Chicago Red Stars	
24	(England) Jodie Taylor	Reign FC	(United States) Rose Lavelle	Washington Spirit	(United States) Ashlyn Harris	Orlando Pride	
25	(United States) Jessica McDonald	North Carolina Courage	(Brazil) Marta	Orlando Pride	(United States) Casey Murphy	Reign FC	

=== Annual awards ===
Award	Winner		
Golden Boot	(Australia) Sam Kerr	Chicago Red Stars	18 goals (NWSL Record)
Coach of the Year	(North Macedonia) Vlatko Andonovski	Reign FC	First head coach to win award for two different teams
Rookie of the Year	(United States) Bethany Balcer	Reign FC	6 Goals; 2 Assists
Goalkeeper of the Year	(United States) Aubrey Bledsoe	Washington Spirit	86 Saves; 9 Shutouts
Defender of the Year	(United States) Becky Sauerbrunn	Utah Royals FC	87.6% PassIng accuracy (1st in league)
Most Valuable Player	(Australia) Sam Kerr	Chicago Red Stars	18 goals; Player of the Month twice; Player of the Week six times

NWSL Team of the Season
Position	Best XI		Second XI	
Goalkeeper	(United States) Aubrey Bledsoe	Washington Spirit	(United States) Alyssa Naeher	Chicago Red Stars
Defender	(United States) Ali Krieger	Orlando Pride	(United States) Lauren Barnes	Reign FC
Defender	(United States) Becky Sauerbrunn	Utah Royals FC	(New Zealand) Abby Erceg	North Carolina Courage
Defender	(United States) Abby Dahlkemper	North Carolina Courage	(United States) Kelley O'Hara	Utah Royals FC
Defender	(United States) Casey Short	Chicago Red Stars	(United States) Emily Sonnett	Portland Thorns FC
Midfielder	(United States) Lindsey Horan	Portland Thorns FC	(United States) Bethany Balcer	Reign FC
Midfielder	(United States) Julie Ertz	Chicago Red Stars	(United States) Crystal Dunn	North Carolina Courage
Midfielder	(United States) Rose Lavelle	Washington Spirit	(Japan) Yuki Nagasato	Chicago Red Stars
Forward	(United States) Christen Press	Utah Royals FC	(United States) Kristen Hamilton	North Carolina Courage
Forward	(Australia) Sam Kerr	Chicago Red Stars	(United States) Carli Lloyd	Sky Blue FC
Forward	(United States) Tobin Heath	Portland Thorns FC	(United States) Megan Rapinoe	Reign FC

NWSL Championship Game MVP
Player	Club	Record
(Brazil) Debinha	North Carolina Courage	Scored opening goal
