= Abby Elinsky =

American soccer player

Personal information
- Full name: Sydney Abigail Elinsky
- Date of birth: January 8, 1996 (age 30)
- Place of birth: West Chester, Pennsylvania, United States
- Height: 5 ft 8 in (1.73 m)
- Position: Midfielder

College career
Years	Team	Apps	(Gls)
2014	Illinois Fighting Illini	20	(2)
2015–2017	North Carolina Tar Heels	62	(3)

Senior career*
Years	Team	Apps	(Gls)
2018	Orlando Pride	2	(0)
2018	ASPTT Albi	12	(6)
2019–2020	Orlando Pride	18	(0)
- * Club domestic league appearances and goals as of October 29, 2020

Sydney Abigail Elinsky (born January 8, 1996) is an American soccer player who plays as a midfielder.

== Early life ==
Elinsky played in the youth ranks of local development side Cleveland United SC. While attending Rocky River High School, she earned NSCAA All-American honors and was named 2013-2014 Gatorade Ohio Girls Soccer Player of the Year. As a forward she scored a school-record 43 goals in 2013 to help the Rocky River Pirates win their first-ever state championship.

=== College ===
In 2014, she played at the University of Illinois in her freshman year before transferring to the University of North Carolina. As a Tar Heel she predominantly played as holding midfielder although she was noted for her versatility, sometimes playing in defense or as a forward. She majored in exercise and sport science.

== Professional career ==
Elinsky was drafted in the third round (30th overall) of the 2018 NWSL College Draft by Houston Dash but was released two weeks prior to the start of the season.

In March 2018, she was signed by Orlando Pride to a National Team Replacement contract and made her professional debut on April 15, coming on as a substitute away to Portland Thorns.

In July 2018, Elinsky joined French Division 2 Féminine side ASPTT Albi. She made her debut for the team on September 9, starting in a 3–1 win over ASPV Strasbourg. She scored her first goal for the club on October 6 in a 2–0 win over Toulouse, the start of a three-game scoring streak. She scored a total of six goals in 12 appearances before leaving in December 2018.

Elinsky returned to Orlando Pride for the 2019 season, and was signed to the senior roster on April 10 after impressing new head coach Marc Skinner in preseason. She was waived at the end of the 2020 season and made available on the re-entry wire but was not picked up.

== Career statistics ==
=== College ===
Club	Season	Apps	Goals
Illinois Fighting Illini	2014	20	2
North Carolina Tar Heels	2015	19	0
North Carolina Tar Heels	2016	21	1
North Carolina Tar Heels	2017	22	2
Career totals		82	5

=== Club ===
As of match played October 17, 2020.

Club	Season	League			Playoffs		Other		Total	
Club	Season	Division	Apps	Goals	Apps	Goals	Apps	Goals	Apps	Goals
Orlando Pride	2018	NWSL	2	0	—		—		2	0
ASPTT Albi	2018–19	D2F	12	6	—		—		12	6
Orlando Pride	2019	NWSL	18	0	—		—		18	0
Orlando Pride	2020	NWSL	—		—		4 (Note: Includes the NWSL Fall Series)	0	4	0
Orlando Pride	Totals		18	0	0	0	4	0	22	0
Career totals			32	6	0	0	4	0	36	6

== Honors ==
=== College ===
North Carolina Tar Heels

- ACC Women's Soccer Tournament: 2017
