= Joanna Fennema =

Retired American soccer player

Personal information
- Full name: Joanna Boyles Fennema
- Birth name: Joanna Bess Boyles
- Date of birth: November 13, 1995 (age 30)
- Place of birth: Raleigh, North Carolina
- Position: Midfielder

Youth career
- 2008–2013: CASL Chelsea Ladies

College career
Years	Team	Apps	(Gls)
2013–2017	North Carolina Tar Heels	84	(14)

Senior career*
Years	Team	Apps	(Gls)
2018	Chicago Red Stars Reserves	8	(5)
2019	Orlando Pride	19	(1)

International career
2009–2010	United States U15		
2010–2012	United States U17		
2014	United States U20		

Managerial career
- 2021–2023: Columbus State Cougars (assistant)
- 2024–: Lenoir-Rhyne University (Head Coach)
- * Club domestic league appearances and goals

Joanna Boyles Fennema (born Joanna Bess Boyles; November 13, 1995) is an American soccer coach and former player who played as a midfielder. She last played for Orlando Pride in the National Women's Soccer League.

== Early life ==
Fennema graduated from Sanderson High School in 2013 having chosen to solely concentrate on club soccer with CASL Chelsea Ladies.

=== College ===
Fennema attended the University of North Carolina. In her first year with the Tar Heels she made 23 appearances all as a substitute. In 2014 she started in all 20 of her appearances. In 2016 she took a red-shirt season in order to recover from back-to-back ACL tears in both knees. She returned for her senior year in 2017, helping the team win the 2017 ACC Women's Soccer Tournament and was selected to the All-ACC Second team. Her college coach Anson Dorrance said Fennema was "technically my most gifted player. Even if you look at our entire history of our brilliant technicians she ranks right up there with the Tobin Heaths and the Meghan Klingenbergs and some of the best technical players that we've ever had here at UNC."

== Professional career ==
=== Chicago Red Stars ===
Fennema was drafted in the fourth round (32nd overall) of the 2018 NWSL College Draft by the Boston Breakers but the team folded one week later. She was picked up in the third round (25th overall) of the 2018 NWSL Dispersal Draft by the Chicago Red Stars. She spent the 2018 season with the team's reserves in the Women's Premier Soccer League.

=== Orlando Pride ===
Fennema joined Orlando Pride for the 2019 season, signing to their supplemental roster on April 10 after impressing new head coach Marc Skinner in preseason. She made her debut on April 14 in the team's season opener at home to Portland Thorns. On June 15, she scored her first goal for the team, a free kick in a 2–2 draw against Houston Dash.

Fennema retired from professional soccer after suffering a back injury on February 28, 2020.

== International career ==
Fennema represented the United States internationally at U-15 and U-17 level. In 2012 she won the CONCACAF U-17 Championship and was part of the squad that traveled to Azerbaijan for the U-17 World Cup.

In 2014, Fennema was called in regularly to train with the U-20 squad but was one of the final cuts before the 2014 U-20 World Cup.

== Coaching career ==
In January 2025, Joanna Fennema was hired as the associate head coach of the North Carolina State University women's soccer team by new NCSU head coach Gary Higgins . She was hired following her first and only season as the head coach of Lenoir-Rhyne University. Previously she was the Assistant Soccer Coach of Columbus State Cougars from 2020 to 2023.

== Personal life ==
Formerly known as Joanna Boyles, she married Parker Fennema in November 2019 and began using her married name afterward.

== Honors ==
North Carolina Tar Heels

- ACC Women's Soccer Tournament: 2017

United States U17

- CONCACAF Women's U-17 Championship: 2012
