= Tierna Davidson =

American soccer player (born 1998)

- Davidson with Gotham FC in 2026

Personal information
- Full name: Tierna Lillis Davidson
- Date of birth: September 19, 1998 (age 28)
- Place of birth: Menlo Park, California, U.S.
- Height: 5 ft 10 in (1.78 m)
- Positions: Center back; left back

Team information
- Current team: Gotham FC
- Number: 15

College career
| Years | Team | Apps | (Gls) |
| 2016–2018 | Stanford Cardinal | 46 | (5) |

Senior career*
| Years | Team | Apps | (Gls) |
| 2019–2023 | Chicago Red Stars | 48 | (1) |
| 2024– | Gotham FC | 51 | (3) |

International career^{‡}
| 2015–2018 | United States U20 | 8 | (1) |
| 2018– | United States | 72 | (3) |
Medal record
Women's soccer
Representing the United States
CONCACAF W Gold Cup
| Winner | 2024 United States |
Olympic Games
| Gold medal – first place | 2024 Paris | Team |
| Bronze medal – third place | 2020 Tokyo | Team |
FIFA Women's World Cup
| Gold medal – first place | 2019 France | Team |
- * Club domestic league appearances and goals as of November 1, 2026 ‡ National team caps and goals as of October 13, 2026

Tierna Lillis Davidson (/ˈtɪərnə/ TEER-nə; born September 19, 1998) is an American professional soccer player who plays as a center back for Gotham FC of the National Women's Soccer League (NWSL) and the United States national team.

Davidson played college soccer for the Stanford Cardinal, helping lead the team to the 2017 national championship and earning first-team All-American honors as a sophomore. After three years at Stanford, she was drafted first overall by the Chicago Red Stars in the 2019 NWSL College Draft. She spent five seasons with Chicago before signing with Gotham FC as a free agent in 2024.

Davidson made her international debut for the United States in 2018, winning U.S. Soccer Young Female Player of the Year. She was the youngest member of the squad that won the 2019 FIFA Women's World Cup. She won the bronze medal at the 2020 Tokyo Olympics and the gold medal at the 2024 Paris Olympics.

== Early life ==
Davidson intended to become an astronaut before actively pursuing professional soccer.

=== Stanford University, 2016–2018 ===
In her freshman year, Davidson started all 21 games for the Cardinal and was named to the Pac-12 All Freshman team and the All-Pac-12 Second Team. In 2017, Davidson was named Pac-12 Defensive Player of the Year. She was a key part of the Stanford team that won the 2017 NCAA Division I Women's Soccer Tournament and was named the 2017 College Cup Most Outstanding Defensive Player. In 2018 Davidson only appeared in 3 games for Stanford as she suffered a fractured ankle on September 9 against North Carolina. This would be her final appearance for Stanford as she declared for the 2019 NWSL College Draft, forgoing her final year of college eligibility.

== Club career ==
=== Chicago Red Stars, 2019–2023 ===
In November 2018, the National Women's Soccer League changed the rules for the NWSL College Draft to allow for players to enter the draft before they had exhausted their college eligibility. This allowed Davidson to declare for the 2019 NWSL College Draft after only playing three years at Stanford. Davidson was selected 1st overall at the draft by the Chicago Red Stars, she was the second consecutive Cardinal to be selected 1st overall after Andi Sullivan was the 1st overall pick in 2018. On March 11, 2019, Davidson signed a contract with the Red Stars.

Davidson suffered an ACL injury in March 2022, causing her to miss the remainder of the 2022 NWSL season.

=== Gotham FC, 2024–present ===
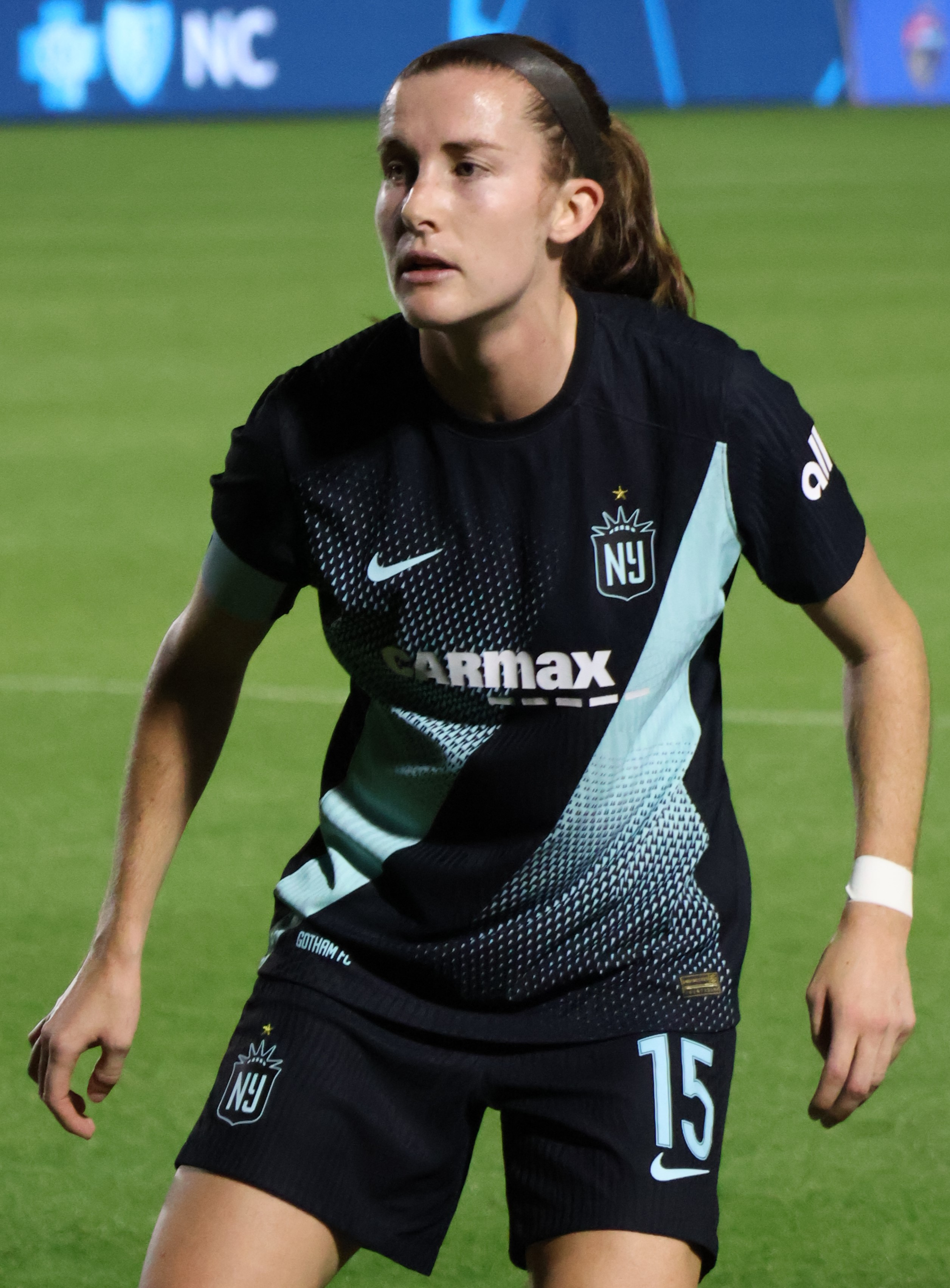
Davidson playing for Gotham FC in 2024

Upon becoming an unrestricted free agent, Davidson signed a three-year contract with Gotham FC on January 2, 2024, to play through 2026. Davidson made her debut for Gotham on March 15, 2024, in the 2024 NWSL Challenge Cup. On November 10, she scored the opening goal against Portland Thorns FC in the NWSL quarterfinals; Gotham FC would go on to win the match, 2–1. Davidson started in the team's semi-final match, where Gotham lost on penalties to the Washington Spirit.

Ahead of her second season with Gotham FC, Davidson's teammates voted her to be named the club captain. She started each of Gotham's first three regular season matches before going down with an injury in the 40th minute of the third fixture, a 0–0 draw with the Houston Dash. On April 2, 2025, Gotham FC announced that Davidson would miss the remainder of the season with a torn ACL, her second ACL injury in three years. On March 1, 2026, Gotham announced that she had been activated from the season-ending injury list.

== International career ==
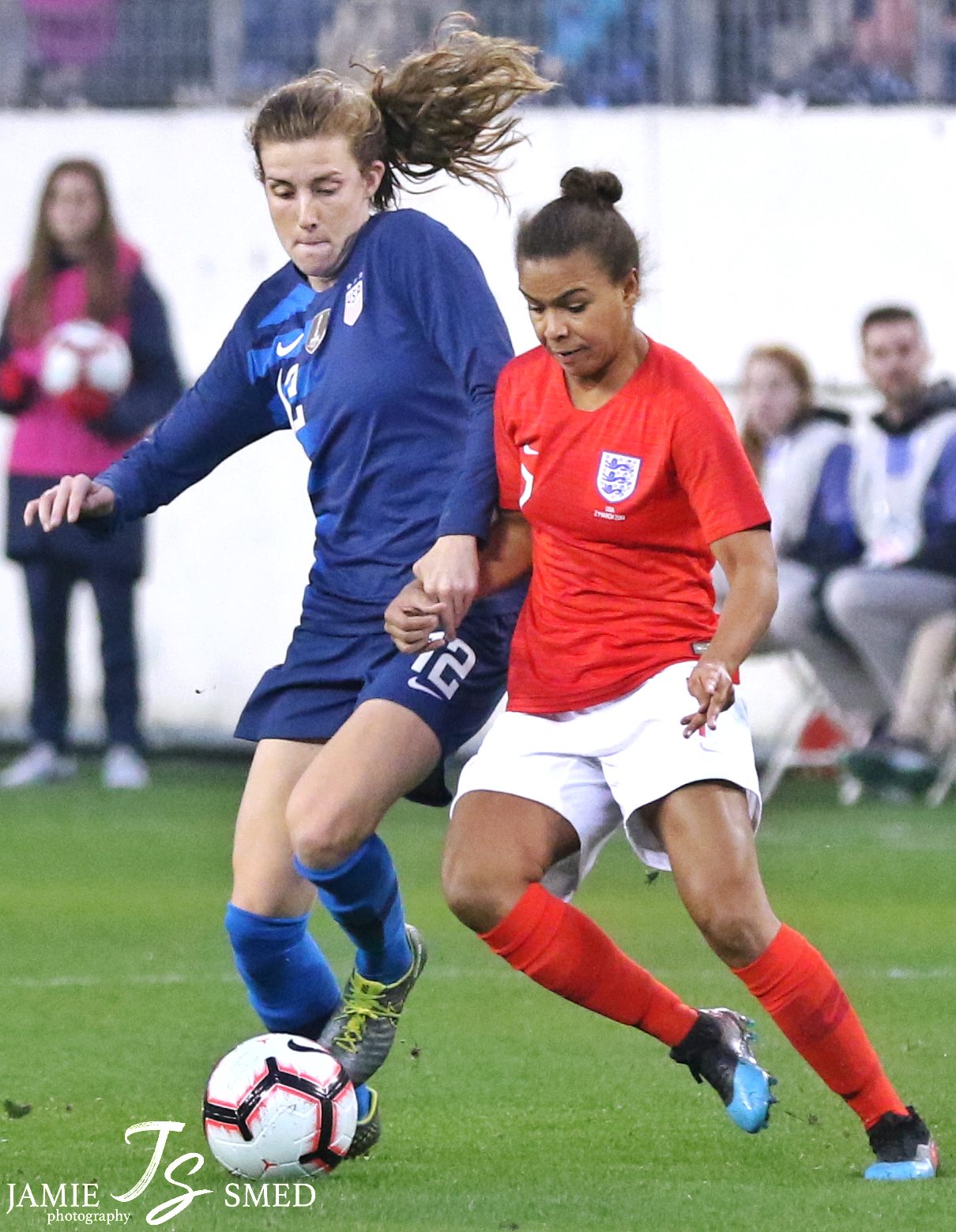
Davidson with the USWNT in 2019

In 2018 Davidson played for both the senior USWNT and the U-20 WNT. She received her first senior cap on January 21, 2018, in a friendly against Denmark. After the match, she joined the U-20 squad in Trinidad & Tobago for the 2018 CONCACAF U-20 Championship. Davidson scored the tying goal in the final against Mexico, but the United States lost on penalty kicks. Davidson was not part of the final roster for the 2018 FIFA U-20 World Cup as she had continued to receive call-ups to the senior national team. On July 18 she was named to the USWNT roster for the 2018 Tournament of Nations.

Davidson scored her first international goal on August 31, 2018, against Chile. Davidson was not part of the 2018 CONCACAF Championship due to a fractured ankle injury while playing for Stanford. In December, Davidson was named 2018 U.S. Soccer Young Female Player of the Year.

After recovering from injury, Davidson returned to the USWNT in January 2019 and was named to the roster for the 2019 SheBelieves Cup in February.

In May 2019, Davidson was named to the final 23-player squad for the 2019 FIFA World Cup. She was the youngest player on the roster and became the 6th ever under-21 player to start at a World Cup game for the USWNT after being named to the United States' starting lineup for their second group stage match. During her World Cup debut, Davidson assisted Julie Ertz and Carli Lloyd for the second and third goals of a 3–0 victory over Chile.

In June 2021, Davidson was named to the 18-player squad for the 2020 Summer Olympics held in Tokyo.

Davidson made her international return from her ACL injury in April 2023, playing in the final match before the announcement of the USWNT's 2023 FIFA Women's World Cup roster. Ultimately, she was not selected to the USWNT's squad for the tournament.

In February 2024, Davidson was named to the USWNT's CONCACAF W Gold Cup pre-tournament camp and roster. She started in the USWNT's match against Argentina and Colombia.

In June 2024, Davidson was selected to the 18-player roster for the 2024 Summer Olympics in France. She started the USWNT's first two matches but picked up a knee contusion in a group stage match versus Germany, forcing her to miss the next two matches of the tournament. Davidson then returned to the starting lineup in the USWNT's semi-final and gold medal fixtures. In both games, she was substituted off for club teammate Emily Sonnett later in the match. The United States would go on to win gold, beating Brazil 1–0 on a goal from Mallory Swanson.

== Personal life ==
Davidson is openly lesbian and married former Stanford Cardinal teammate, Alison Jahansouz, in December 2024.

== Career statistics ==
=== Club ===
As of April 2, 2025

| Club | Season | League | | | Cup (Note: Includes the NWSL Challenge Cup) | | Playoffs (Note: Includes NWSL Playoffs and A-League Women Finals series) | | Other | | Continental (Note: Includes the CONCACAF W Champions Cup) | | Total | |
| Club | Season | Division | Apps | Goals | Apps | Goals | Apps | Goals | Apps | Goals | Apps | Goals | Apps | Goals |
|---|---|---|---|---|---|---|---|---|---|---|---|---|---|---|
| Chicago Red Stars | 2019 | NWSL | 13 | 1 | — | | 1 | 0 | — | | — | | 14 | 1 |
| Chicago Red Stars | 2020 | NWSL | — | | 1 | 0 | — | | 2 (Note: Includes the NWSL Fall Series) | 0 | — | | 3 | 0 |
| Chicago Red Stars | 2021 | NWSL | 17 | 0 | 2 | 0 | 3 | 0 | — | | — | | 22 | 0 |
| Chicago Red Stars | 2022 | NWSL | 0 | 0 | 1 | 0 | 0 | 0 | — | | — | | 1 | 0 |
| Chicago Red Stars | 2023 | NWSL | 18 | 0 | 6 | 0 | — | | — | | — | | 24 | 0 |
| Chicago Red Stars | Total | | 48 | 1 | 10 | 0 | 4 | 0 | 2 | 0 | 0 | 0 | 64 | 1 |
| Gotham FC | 2024 | NWSL | 19 | 0 | 1 | 0 | 2 | 1 | 0 | 0 | 1 | 0 | 23 | 1 |
| Gotham FC | 2025 | NWSL | 3 | 0 | — | | — | | — | | — | | 3 | 0 |
| Gotham FC | Total | | 22 | 0 | 1 | 0 | 2 | 1 | 0 | 0 | 1 | 0 | 26 | 1 |
| Career total | | | 70 | 1 | 11 | 0 | 6 | 1 | 2 | 0 | 0 | 0 | 90 | 2 |

=== International ===
As of match played October 13, 2026

| National Team | Year | Apps | Goals |
|---|---|---|---|
United States
| United States | 2018 | 12 | 1 |
| United States | 2019 | 13 | 0 |
| United States | 2020 | 1 | 0 |
| United States | 2021 | 19 | 0 |
| United States | 2022 | 3 | 0 |
| United States | 2023 | 3 | 0 |
| United States | 2024 | 14 | 2 |
| United States | 2025 | 2 | 0 |
| United States | 2026 | 5 | 0 |
| Total | | 72 | 3 |

Scores and results list United States's goal tally first, score column indicates score after each Davidson goal.

List of international goals scored by Tierna Davidson
| No. | Date | Venue | Opponent | Score | Result | Competition | Ref. |
|---|---|---|---|---|---|---|---|
| 1 | August 31, 2018 | Carson, California | Chile | 1–0 | 3–0 | Friendly | |
| 2 | June 1, 2024 | Commerce City, Colorado | South Korea | 2–0 | 4–0 | Friendly | |
| 3 | June 1, 2024 | Commerce City, Colorado | South Korea | 3–0 | 4–0 | Friendly | |

== Honors ==
Stanford Cardinal

- NCAA Division I Women's Soccer Championship: 2017

Gotham FC

- NWSL Championship: 2025
- NWSL Shield: 2026
- NWSL Challenge Cup: 2026
- CONCACAF W Champions Cup: 2024–25

United States

- FIFA Women's World Cup: 2019
- Summer Olympic Games Gold Medal: 2024
- Summer Olympic Games Bronze Medal: 2020
- CONCACAF W Gold Cup: 2024
- SheBelieves Cup: 2018; 2020; 2021; 2022,2024
- Tournament of Nations: 2018

Individual

- U.S. Soccer Young Female Player of the Year: 2018
- NWSL Best XI First Team: 2026
