= 2019 NWSL College Draft =

Soccer draft

General information
- Sport: Soccer
- Date: January 10, 2019
- Time: 12:00 PM ET
- Location: Chicago, Illinois

Overview
- 36 total selections in 4 rounds
- League: National Women's Soccer League
- First selection: Tierna Davidson, Chicago Red Stars
- Most selections: Sky Blue FC (8 picks)
- Fewest selections: Seattle Reign FC (0 picks)

The 2019 NWSL College Draft was the seventh annual meeting of National Women's Soccer League (NWSL) franchises to select newly eligible college players for the 2019 NWSL season. It was held on January 10, 2019, in conjunction with the United Soccer Coaches Convention in Chicago, Illinois.

== Format ==
- Draft order was determined by the final 2018 regular season standings.
- Final list of registered players was released on January 9, 2019.

== Results ==
As of November 20, 2025

=== Key ===
^{+}	Denotes player who has been selected as NWSL Most Valuable Player
^{*}	Denotes player who has been selected for an NWSL Best XI or NWSL Second XI team
^{^}	Denotes player who has been selected as NWSL Rookie of the Year
^{#}	Denotes player who has never appeared in a competitive NWSL game (regular season, playoff, Challenge Cup, or 2020 Fall Series)

=== Picks ===
Round	Pick	Nat.	Player	Pos.	NWSL team	Notes	College
Round 1	1	(United States)	Tierna Davidson	D	Chicago Red Stars	(Note: Utah Royals FC → Chicago Red Stars. Chicago Red Stars acquired the No. 1 overall pick and the No. 7 overall pick in the 2019 NWSL College Draft from Utah Royals FC in exchange for the rights to Christen Press. Utah Royals FC received the No. 1 overall pick in the 2019 NWSL College Draft when they entered the league.)	Stanford
Round 1	2	(United States)	Hailie Mace *	D	Sky Blue FC		UCLA
Round 1	3	(United States)	Jordan DiBiasi	M	Washington Spirit	(Note: Washington Spirit → Sky Blue FC → Washington Spirit. Sky Blue FC received a conditional first-round and natural second-round pick in the 2019 NWSL College Draft from Washington Spirit in exchange for the No. 1 overall pick in the 2018 NWSL Dispersal Draft. Washington Spirit re-acquired this pick in exchange for the No. 29 overall pick, Estelle Johnson, Caprice Dydasco, and DiDi Haracic.)	Stanford
Round 1	4	(United States)	Sam Staab *	D	Washington Spirit	(Note: Orlando Pride → Washington Spirit. Washington Spirit acquired Orlando Pride's natural first-round pick in the 2019 NWSL College Draft and Aubrey Bledsoe in exchange for Shelina Zadorsky.)	Clemson
Round 1	5	(United States)	Leah Pruitt	F	North Carolina Courage	(Note: Houston Dash → North Carolina Courage. North Carolina Courage acquired Houston Dash's natural first-round pick in the 2019 NWSL College Draft in exchange for two second-round picks in the 2019 NWSL College Draft and Allysha Chapman.)	USC
Round 1	6	(United States)	Julia Ashley	D	Sky Blue FC	(Note: Chicago Red Stars → Sky Blue FC. Sky Blue FC acquired the No. 6 overall pick in the 2019 NWSL College Draft and Chicago Red Stars' highest second-round pick in the 2020 NWSL College Draft in exchange for Katie Johnson.)	North Carolina
Round 1	7	(United States)	Tegan McGrady	D	Washington Spirit	(Note: Seattle Reign FC → Orlando Pride → Utah Royals FC → Chicago Red Stars → Washington Spirit. Washington Spirit acquired the No. 7 overall pick in the 2019 NWSL College Draft from Chicago Red Stars in exchange for the No. 20 overall pick and the club's natural first-round pick in the 2020 NWSL College Draft. Chicago Red Stars acquired the No. 1 overall pick and the No. 7 overall pick in the 2019 NWSL College Draft from Utah Royals FC in exchange for the rights to Christen Press. Utah Royals FC acquired the No. 7 overall pick from Orlando Pride (via Seattle Reign FC).)	Stanford
Round 1	8	(United States)	Dorian Bailey	M	Washington Spirit	(Note: Portland Thorns FC → Washington Spirit. Washington Spirit acquired Portland Thorns FC's natural first-round pick in the 2019 NWSL College Draft in exchange for a 2018 international roster spot and future considerations.)	North Carolina
Round 1	9	(United States)	Hailey Harbison	F	North Carolina Courage	(Note: North Carolina Courage → Seattle Reign FC → North Carolina Courage. Seattle Reign FC acquired North Carolina Courage's natural first-round pick in the 2019 NWSL College Draft in exchange for Seattle's natural second-round pick in the 2019 NWSL College Draft and Merritt Mathias. North Carolina Courage re-acquired their natural first-round pick in the 2019 NWSL College Draft in exchange for the rights to Darian Jenkins.)	Pepperdine
Round 2	10	(United States)	Paige Monaghan	F	Sky Blue FC		Butler
Round 2	11	(United States)	Julie James	M	Sky Blue FC	(Note: Washington Spirit → Sky Blue FC. Sky Blue FC received a conditional first-round and natural second-round pick in the 2019 NWSL College Draft from Washington Spirit in exchange for the No. 1 overall pick in the 2018 NWSL Dispersal Draft.)	Baylor
Round 2	12	(United States)	Ally Prisock	D	Houston Dash	(Note: Orlando Pride → Houston Dash. Houston Dash acquired Orlando Pride's natural second-round pick in the 2019 NWSL College Draft in exchange for defender Poliana.)	USC
Round 2	13	(United States)	Cece Kizer	F	Houston Dash		Ole Miss
Round 2	14	(United States)	Lauren Milliet	M	North Carolina Courage	(Note: Utah Royals FC → North Carolina Courage. North Carolina Courage acquired Utah Royals FC's natural second-round pick in the 2019 NWSL College Draft and the rights to Heather O'Reilly in exchange for Makenzy Doniak and North Carolina's natural third-round pick in the 2019 NWSL College Draft.)	Colorado College
Round 2	15	(Mexico)	María Sánchez	F	Chicago Red Stars		Santa Clara
Round 2	16	(United States)	Betsy Brandon	M	Houston Dash	(Note: Seattle Reign FC → North Carolina Courage → Houston Dash. North Carolina Courage acquired Houston Dash's natural first-round pick in the 2019 NWSL College Draft in exchange for two second-round picks in the 2019 NWSL College Draft and Allysha Chapman. Seattle Reign FC acquired North Carolina Courage's natural first-round pick in the 2019 NWSL College Draft in exchange for Seattle's natural second-round pick in the 2019 NWSL College Draft and Merritt Mathias.)	Virginia
Round 2	17	(United States)	Bayley Feist	M	Washington Spirit	(Note: Portland Thorns FC → Washington Spirit. Washington Spirit acquired the No. 17 overall pick in the 2019 NWSL College Draft from Portland Thorns FC in exchange for the No. 31 overall pick in the 2019 NWSL College Draft and Washington's natural second-round pick in the 2020 NWSL College Draft.)	Wake Forest
Round 2	18	(Jamaica)	Kayla McCoy	F	Houston Dash	(Note: North Carolina Courage → Houston Dash. North Carolina Courage acquired Houston Dash's natural first-round pick in the 2019 NWSL College Draft in exchange for two second-round picks in the 2019 NWSL College Draft and Allysha Chapman.)	Duke
Round 3	19	(Republic of Ireland)	Kyra Carusa	F	Sky Blue FC		Georgetown
Round 3	20	(Canada)	Bianca St-Georges	F	Chicago Red Stars	(Note: Washington Spirit → Chicago Red Stars. Chicago Red Stars acquired the No. 20 overall pick in the 2019 NWSL College Draft and Washington Spirit's natural first-round pick in the 2020 NWSL College Draft in exchange for the No. 7 overall pick in the 2019 NWSL College Draft.)	West Virginia
Round 3	21	(United States)	Jazmin Jackmon^{#}	D	Houston Dash	(Note: Orlando Pride → Houston Dash. Houston Dash acquired Orlando Pride's natural third-round pick in the 2019 NWSL College Draft in exchange for Lotta Ökvist.)	Oregon
Round 3	22	(United States)	Grace Cutler^{#}	M	Houston Dash		West Virginia
Round 3	23	(United States)	Michelle Maemone	D	Utah Royals FC		Pepperdine
Round 3	24	(United States)	Emily Ogle	M	Portland Thorns FC	(Note: Chicago Red Stars → Portland Thorns FC. Portland Thorns FC acquired the No. 24 overall pick from the Chicago Red Stars in exchange for the No. 31 and No. 35 overall picks in the 2019 NWSL College Draft.)	Penn State
Round 3	25	(United States)	Erin Greening	M	Orlando Pride	(Note: Seattle Reign FC → Orlando Pride. Orlando Pride acquired Seattle Reign FC's natural third-round pick in the 2019 NWSL College Draft and Haley Kopmeyer in exchange for Jasmyne Spencer.)	Colorado
Round 3	26	(United States)	Kayla Sharples *	D	Chicago Red Stars	(Note: Portland Thorns FC → Chicago Red Stars. Chicago Red Stars acquired Portland Thorns FC's natural third-round pick in the 2019 NWSL College Draft in exchange for the 29th pick in the 2018 NWSL College Draft.)	Northwestern
Round 3	27	(United States)	Maddie Nolf	D	Utah Royals FC	(Note: North Carolina Courage → Utah Royals FC. North Carolina Courage acquired Utah Royals FC's natural second-round pick in the 2019 NWSL College Draft and the rights to Heather O'Reilly in exchange for Makenzy Doniak and North Carolina's natural third-round pick in the 2019 NWSL College Draft.)	Penn State
Round 4	28	(United States)	Kaylan Marckese^{#}	G	Sky Blue FC		Florida
Round 4	29	(United States)	Kenie Wright	M	Sky Blue FC	(Note: Sky Blue FC → Washington Spirit. Sky Blue FC acquired this pick, Estelle Johnson, Caprice Dydasco, and DiDi Haracic in exchange for the No. 3 overall pick.)	Rutgers
Round 4	30	(United States)	Marisa Viggiano	M	Orlando Pride		Northwestern
Round 4	31	(United States)	April Bockin^{#}	F	Chicago Red Stars	(Note: Houston Dash → Washington Spirit → Portland Thorns FC → Chicago Red Stars. Washington Spirit acquired Houston Dash's natural fourth-round pick in the 2019 NWSL College Draft in exchange for Tiffany Weimer. Portland Thorns FC acquired the No. 31 overall pick in the 2019 NWSL College Draft and Washington Spirit's natural second-round pick in the 2020 NWSL College Draft in exchange for the No. 17 overall pick in the 2019 NWSL College Draft. Chicago Red Stars then acquired the No. 31 and No. 35 overall picks in the 2019 NWSL College Draft from the Portland Thorns FC in exchange for the No. 24 overall pick in the 2019 NWSL College Draft.)	Minnesota
Round 4	32	(Peru)	Alexandra Kimball^{#}	M	Utah Royals FC		North Carolina
Round 4	33	(United States)	Hannah Davison	D	Chicago Red Stars		Northwestern
Round 4	34	(Mexico)	Sabrina Flores	D	Sky Blue FC	(Note: Seattle Reign FC → Sky Blue FC. Sky Blue FC acquired Seattle Reign FC's natural fourth-round pick in the 2019 NWSL College Draft in exchange for Adriana Leon.)	Notre Dame
Round 4	35	(United States)	Jenna Szczesny	F	Chicago Red Stars	(Note: Portland Thorns FC → Chicago Red Stars. Chicago Red Stars acquired the No. 31 and No. 35 overall picks in the 2019 NWSL College Draft from the Portland Thorns FC in exchange for the No. 24 overall pick in the 2019 NWSL College Draft.)	Loyola–Chicago
Round 4	36	(United States)	Kaycie Tillman^{#}	M	North Carolina Courage		Florida State

=== Notable undrafted players ===
Below is a list of undrafted rookies who appeared in a competitive NWSL game in 2019.

Nat.	Player	Pos.	Original NWSL team	College	Notes
(United States)	Bethany Balcer ^*	F	Seattle Reign FC	Spring Arbor	First NAIA player to sign with an NWSL club. First undrafted player named Rookie of the Year.
(United States)	Lainey Burdett	G	Orlando Pride	Arizona	
(United States)	Marissa Everett	F	Portland Thorns FC	Oregon	
(United States)	Caitlin Farrell	F	Orlando Pride	Georgetown	
(United States)	Samantha Leshnak	G	North Carolina Courage	Georgetown	
(United States)	Madison Pogarch	D	Portland Thorns FC	Rutgers	
(United States)	Raisa Strom-Okimoto	F	Utah Royals FC	Hawaii	
(United States)	Gaby Vincent	D	Utah Royals FC	Louisville	
(United States)	Shae Yáñez	G	Washington Spirit	Tennessee	

== Trades ==
Round 1:

Round 2:

Round 3:

Round 4:

== Summary ==
In 2019, a total of 26 colleges had players selected. Of these, five had a player drafted to the NWSL for the first time: Baylor, Butler, Loyola–Chicago, Northwestern and Oregon.

=== Schools with multiple draft selections ===
Selections	Schools
3	North Carolina, Northwestern, Stanford
2	Penn State, Pepperdine, USC, West Virginia

=== Selections by college athletic conference ===
Conference	Round 1	Round 2	Round 3	Round 4	Total
ACC	3	3	0	3	9
Big East	0	1	1	0	2
Big Ten	0	0	3	4	7
Big 12	0	1	2	0	3
Missouri Valley	0	0	0	1	1
Mountain West	0	1	0	0	1
Pac-12	5	1	2	0	8
SEC	0	1	0	1	2
West Coast	1	1	1	0	3

=== Selections by position ===
Position	Round 1	Round 2	Round 3	Round 4	Total
Goalkeeper	0	0	0	1	1
Defender	5	1	4	2	12
Midfielder	2	4	3	4	13
Forward	2	4	2	2	10

== See also ==
- List of NWSL drafts
- List of National Women's Soccer League draftees by college team
- 2018 National Women's Soccer League season
