= Erin Greening =

American soccer player

Personal information
- Full name: Erin Marie Greening
- Date of birth: June 20, 1997 (age 29)
- Place of birth: San Francisco, California
- Height: 5 ft 7 in (1.70 m)
- Position: Defender

Youth career
- 2011–2014: Bay Oaks Botafogo

College career
Years	Team	Apps	(Gls)
2015–2018	Colorado Buffaloes	74	(2)

Senior career*
Years	Team	Apps	(Gls)
2019	Orlando Pride	17	(1)
2021	Klepp IL	9	(0)
2022–2023	Glasgow City	14	(3)
- * Club domestic league appearances and goals as of March 12, 2023

Erin Marie Greening (born June 20, 1997) is an American soccer player who plays as a defender. She has previously played college soccer for Colorado Buffaloes before a professional career with Orlando Pride in the United States, in Norway with Klepp IL and Scottish Women's Premier League team Glasgow City.

== Early life ==
Greening played with local club side Bay Oaks Botafogo in Oakland, winning back-to-back CYSA State Championships in 2012 and 2013. She lettered four years at Piedmont High School and was named All-League for all four seasons on the way to becoming the school's all-time leading scorer.

=== Colorado Buffaloes ===
Greening attended the University of Colorado Boulder from 2015 to 2018 where she got a degree in strategic communication and was a three time Pac-12 All-Academic honorable mention. She was a multi-positional player during her collegiate career, playing midfield and forward in her first two years before transitioning to full-back. In her junior year, she was part of a defensive line that kept a school-record 14 shutouts.

== Professional career ==
=== Orlando Pride ===
Greening was selected in the third round (25th overall) of the 2019 NWSL College Draft by Orlando Pride. Following preseason, she was officially signed to the team's senior roster on April 10. She made her professional debut on April 14 as a substitute in the team's season opener at home to Portland Thorns. She scored her first professional goal on July 14, 2019, a 90th-minute equalizer against the same opposition. Portland would go on to win 4–3 in stoppage time. On August 5, 2020, Greening was waived.

=== Klepp IL ===
On January 25, 2021, Greening signed for Norwegian Toppserien team Klepp IL. In April 2021, Klepp general manager Thomas Langholm Enger confirmed Greening was one of four foreign recruits signed by the club still waiting for permission from the Norwegian government to enter the country due to the ongoing COVID-19 pandemic. After being named as an unused substitute twice, Greening made her Klepp debut on June 26 as a 64th-minute substitute in a 7–0 defeat to defending champions Vålerenga and made her first start four days later as Klepp lost 2–1 to Rosenborg. Greening missed the next fourteen weeks with a tibial fracture. In total, she appeared in nine league games with six starts as Klepp finished bottom and were relegated to the 1. divisjon.

=== Glasgow City ===
On August 1, 2022, Greening signed for Glasgow City of the Scottish Women's Premier League. She competed in the 2023 UEFA Champions League and won the Scottish Women's Premier League. She was released at the end of her contract in June 2023.

== Career statistics ==
=== Club ===
As of match played March 12, 2023.

Club	Season	League			National Cup (Note: Norwegian Women's Cup and Scottish Women's Cup)		League Cup (Note: Scottish Women's Premier League Cup)		Continental (Note: UEFA Women's Champions League)		Total	
Club	Season	Division	Apps	Goals	Apps	Goals	Apps	Goals	Apps	Goals	Apps	Goals
Orlando Pride	2019	NWSL	17	1	—		—		—		17	1
Klepp IL	2021	Toppserien	9	0	3	0	—		—		12	0
Glasgow City FC	2022–23	SWPL	14	3	1	1	2	0	2	0	19	4
Career total			40	4	4	1	2	0	2	0	48	5

== Honors ==
Glasgow City

- Scottish Women's Premier League: 2022–23
