= Bridget Callahan =

American soccer player

Personal information
- Full name: Bridget Rose Callahan
- Date of birth: April 16, 1996 (age 30)
- Place of birth: Hollywood, Florida
- Height: 5 ft 5 in (1.65 m)
- Position: Midfielder

Youth career
- Weston FC

College career
Years	Team	Apps	(Gls)
2014–2017	UCF Knights	75	(9)

Senior career*
Years	Team	Apps	(Gls)
2016–2017	FC Surge		
2018–2019	Orlando Pride	9	(0)
- * Club domestic league appearances and goals as of June 21, 2020

Bridget Rose Callahan (born April 16, 1996) is an American soccer player who last played as a midfielder for Orlando Pride in the NWSL.

== Early life ==
Callahan attended Chaminade-Madonna College Preparatory School in Hollywood, Florida, and helped the school to back-to-back district championships in 2012 and 2013, the first titles in school history. During her high school career, she was selected to the Miami Herald All-County First Team in three consecutive years. She was also honored as the Sun Sentinel team MVP after two exceptional seasons. She started her soccer career at Boggs Field with Hollywood Wildcats Soccer Club and continued to play her club soccer as part of Weston FC's academy. Callahan was also a talented volleyball player in high school.

=== UCF Knights ===
Callahan attended University of Central Florida from 2014 to 2017. She registered nine goals and two assists in 75 games from midfield. In her career at UCF, Callahan became the only player in program history to earn both AAC Offensive and Defensive player of the week honors. During her senior season as a Knight, she started 17 games and played 1301 minutes as the Knights clinched the 2017 AAC regular season title. She graduated from the University of Central Florida with a Bachelor of Arts in Human Communication.

In the off-seasons, Callahan played with local Women's Premier Soccer League side FC Surge.

== Professional career ==
=== Orlando Pride ===
On March 23, 2018, Orlando Pride signed Callahan as a National Team Replacement player. She made her professional debut on March 31, coming on as a substitute away to Washington Spirit. After appearing only once in 2018, she was re-signed to the team for the 2019 season, this time to the full senior squad under new head coach Marc Skinner. Callahan was waived on June 21, 2020, ahead of the start of the 2020 NWSL Challenge Cup.

== Career statistics ==
As of October 5, 2019

Club	League	Season	League		Cup		Continental		Total	
Club	League	Season	Apps	Goals	Apps	Goals	Apps	Goals	Apps	Goals
Orlando Pride	NWSL	2018	1	0	—		—		1	0
Orlando Pride	NWSL	2019	8	0	—		—		8	0
Career total			9	0	0	0	0	0	9	0

== Media work ==
In February 2021, Callahan began calling UCF Knights women's soccer games.
