= Morgan Reid =

American soccer player (born 1995)

Morgan Reid Allen
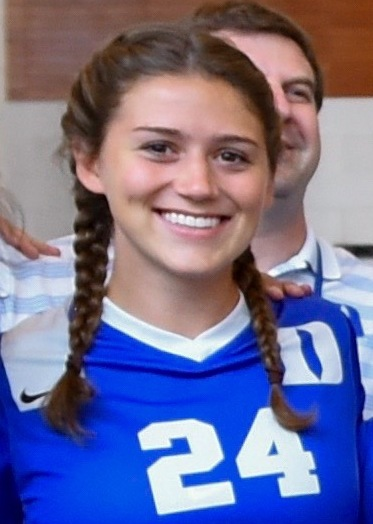
- Reid with Duke in 2016

Personal information
- Full name: Morgan Nicole Reid Allen
- Birth name: Morgan Nicole Reid
- Date of birth: June 13, 1995 (age 31)
- Place of birth: Cleveland, Ohio, United States
- Height: 5 ft 7 in (1.70 m)
- Position: Defender

College career
Years	Team	Apps	(Gls)
2014–2017	Duke Blue Devils	92	(0)

Senior career*
Years	Team	Apps	(Gls)
2018	Oak City United		
2018	North Carolina Courage	0	(0)
2019–2020	Orlando Pride	7	(0)

International career
2012	United States U17		
2014	United States U20		
- * Club domestic league appearances and goals as of October 29, 2020

Morgan Nicole Reid Allen (born Morgan Nicole Reid; June 13, 1995) is an American former soccer player who played as a defender. She played college soccer for the Duke Blue Devils and was drafted by the North Carolina Courage in the fourth round of the 2018 NWSL College Draft.

== Early life ==
Reid was born in Cleveland, Ohio. She grew up in Cary, North Carolina and attended the private Cardinal Gibbons High School in Raleigh, North Carolina, playing both soccer and basketball. She was a four-year letter winner and a two-time team MVP and the basketball team's starting point guard. In 2011 as a sophomore, Reid was invited to attend the U.S. National Soccer Camp in California, gaining a shot at the U.S. Soccer Youth National Team.

In soccer, she guided her team to the 2013 State Championship, scoring against St. Stephens High School in the final. She was named NCSCA Player of the Year and Gatorade Player of the Year for the state of North Carolina in 2014, ranking as the No. 1 player in the South Atlantic Region.

=== Duke Blue Devils (2014–17) ===
Reid attended Duke University from 2014 to 2017, where she got a degree in evolutionary anthropology and was a four-time member of the ACC Honor Roll. She was a four-year starter for the Duke Blue Devils, making a total of 92 appearances. In her senior year she helped the team secure a school-record 18 shutouts before earning another in the 2017 College Cup semi-final against UCLA. However, Duke was eliminated on penalties. Reid had previously made it to a College Cup final in 2015, eventually losing 1–0 to Penn State.

== Club career ==
=== North Carolina Courage (2018) ===
In January 2018, Reid was drafted in the fourth round (38th overall) of the 2018 NWSL College Draft. She failed to make an NWSL appearance for the Courage but did make substitute appearances in two friendlies against French Division 1 teams Paris Saint-Germain and Olympique Lyon as part of the 2018 Women's International Champions Cup. The Courage won the tournament.

=== Orlando Pride (2019–2020) ===
On April 4, 2019, Reid was traded to the Orlando Pride in exchange for a 2020 NWSL College Draft fourth-round pick. She made her competitive professional debut on May 11, 2019, starting against Portland Thorns FC. She was waived at the end of the 2020 season, having missed the year through injury, and made available on the re-entry wire but was not picked up.

=== Retirement ===
In November 2022, Reid revealed she retired due to severe hip pain. Having been misdiagnosed on five occasions, she was finally diagnosed with a labral tear that required surgery after seeing a specialist at the American Hip Institute in Chicago.

== International career ==
Reid was a member of the United States under-17 squad that won the 2012 CONCACAF Women's under-17 Championship. Later that year she was part of the team that traveled to Azerbaijan for the 2012 FIFA under-17 Women's World Cup. They failed to progress from the group stage on goal difference, the first time a team had been eliminated without losing. In 2014, she was called into under-20 camp by Michelle French.

== Personal life ==
Reid grew up in a sports-oriented family. Her parents met at Ohio State University in the late 80s; her father, Brian, was on the wrestling team, and her mother, Cheryl, played basketball. Her grandfather, George Reid, also wrestled and is a celebrated coach, notably as head coach at the University of Georgia. In 2010 he was inducted into the National Wrestling Hall of Fame. Her three brothers, Justin, Jake and Jason all play basketball, while her younger sister, Madison, is a soccer player, having been part of the North Carolina Courage Development Academy before committing to Clemson in 2020.

Reid began dating Duke men's basketball player Grayson Allen while both were attending Duke. They got engaged in February 2022 and married on July 23, 2022.

== Honors ==
Duke Blue Devils

- Atlantic Coast Conference Regular Season: 2017
- Women's College Cup runner-up: 2015

North Carolina Courage

- NWSL Champions: 2018
- NWSL Shield: 2018
- Women's International Champions Cup: 2018

United States U17

- CONCACAF Women's under-17 Championship: 2012
