= Gabby Kessler =

American soccer player (born 1994)

Personal information
- Full name: Gabrielle Lorraine Kessler
- Birth name: Gabrielle Lorraine Seiler
- Date of birth: September 14, 1994 (age 32)
- Place of birth: Fort Hood, Texas, United States
- Height: 1.65 m (5 ft 5 in)
- Position: Midfielder

Youth career
- 2010–2013: McIntosh High School
- Concorde Fire Elite

College career
Years	Team	Apps	(Gls)
2013–2014	Georgia Bulldogs	40	(10)
2015–2017	Florida Gators	46	(7)

Senior career*
Years	Team	Apps	(Gls)
2019–2020	Portland Thorns FC	15	(0)
2021	Houston Dash	24	(2)

International career
2011–2012	United States U-18		
2015	United States U-19		
2013	United States U-20		
2015–2017	United States U-23		
- * Club domestic league appearances and goals as of 01:32, November 10, 2025 (UTC)

Gabrielle Lorraine Kessler (née Seiler; born September 14, 1994) is an American former professional soccer player who last played for Houston Dash of the National Women's Soccer League (NWSL). She also played for Portland Thorns FC.

== Early life ==
Kessler was born in Texas, but was raised in Peachtree City, Georgia, alongside her older brother Zack. Kessler was an impressive multi sport athlete. During high school she was an excellent two-sport athlete in both basketball and soccer. As a basketball player Kessler was a four-year varsity player who broke the all-time scoring record of McIntosh High School with 2003 points. She was also an excellent soccer player and four year varsity player who made the 2012 NSCAA Girls High School All-America Team and NSCAA Georgia Girls State Player of the Year. She finished her high school career ranked 11th nationally by TopDrawer Soccer. Kessler ultimately chose to play soccer in college.

== College career ==
=== University of Georgia, 2013–2014 ===
Kessler started her college career at the University of Georgia. During her two years with the Georgia Bulldogs she made 40 appearances and finished with 10 goals and 11 assists. She was named Georgia's Rookie of the Year in 2013. She also made the All-SEC First-Year Honor Roll her freshman year. During her sophomore year at Georgia Kessler was named Georgia's Most Valuable player, she was also named to the NSCAA All-South Region second team, the All-SEC First Team, the SEC Academic Honor Roll and was nominated for the MAC Hermann Trophy.

=== University of Florida, 2015–2017 ===
After two years at Georgia Kessler opted to transfer to the University of Florida, to join former teammate Savannah Jordan. Due to NCAA transfer rules she was forced to sit out, redshirt, her 2015 season. Kessler made her Gators debut in 2016, starting all 23 matches while scoring one goal and providing 2 assists. Her first year as a Gator saw her pick up NSCAA All-South Region first team, All-SEC first team, SEC All-Tournament, SEC Academic Honor Roll and MAC Hermann Trophy watch list selections. She followed this with a senior year that saw her captain the Gators in 23 games and leading the team with eight assists and six goals. She was once again on the MAC Herman Trophy watch list and was named to the USC All-American third team, USC All-Southeast Region first team, All-SEC first team.

Kessler was also selected to play for the Gators women's basketball team for the 2018 season but was unfortunately unable to do so after picking up an injury. She graduated with a bachelor's degree in Telecommunications-Management and a master's degree in Management

== Club career ==
=== Portland Thorns, 2019–2021 ===
Kessler was selected in the first round, 9th overall, of the 2018 NWSL College Draft by the Portland Thorns. Kessler however missed the totality of the 2018 season due to rehabilitation to her knee. However, Mark Parson's confidence in her resulted in her making the 2019 Portland Thorns squad. She signed in April 2019 and made her debut for the club on April 20 against the Chicago Red Stars.

=== Houston Dash, 2021 ===
On July 18, Kessler scored her first professional goal against the North Carolina Courage on a free kick. She retired from professional soccer in January 2022.

== International career ==
Kessler has been called into several United States Women's National Team camps at the U-18, U-19, U-20 and U-23 levels.

== Personal life ==
She married McClain Kessler on December 18, 2021, and began using her married name Gabby Kessler.

== Career statistics ==
As of June 3, 2019

League	Club	Season	League			Playoffs		Total	
League	Club	Season	Apps	Assists	Goals	Apps	Goals	Apps	Goals
NCAA	Georgia Bulldogs	2013	19	2	1	1	0	20	1
NCAA	Georgia Bulldogs	2014	19	9	9	1	0	20	9
NCAA	Florida Gators	2016	19	2	1	4	0	23	1
NCAA	Florida Gators	2017	19	8	6	4	0	23	6
NCAA	total		76	21	17	10	0	86	17
NWSL	Portland Thorns								
NWSL	Portland Thorns	2019	6	0	0	-		6	0
NWSL	Portland Thorns	total	6	0	0	-		6	0
Career total			82	21	17	10	0	92	17
