= Emily Boyd =

American professional soccer player

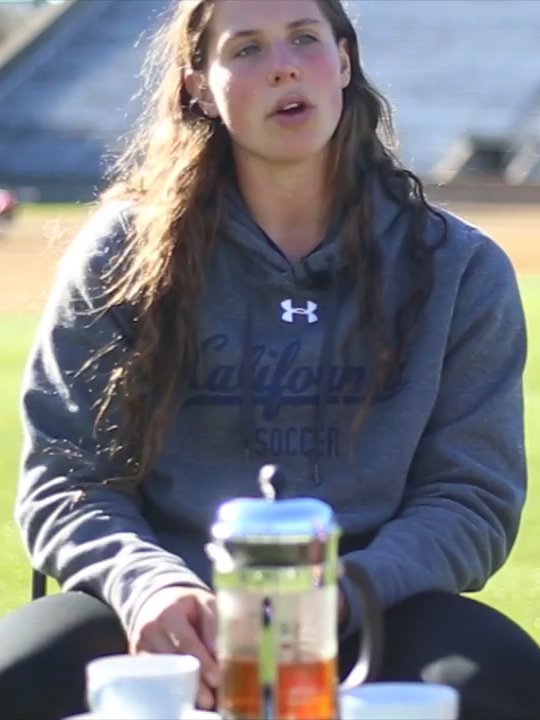
- Boyd in 2017

Personal information
- Full name: Emily Nicole Boyd
- Date of birth: July 25, 1996 (age 30)
- Place of birth: Seattle, Washington, United States
- Height: 1.75 m (5 ft 9 in)
- Position: Goalkeeper

Youth career
- 2010–2014: Nathan Hale High School
- Crossfire Premiere FC

College career
Years	Team	Apps	(Gls)
2014–2017	California Golden Bears	85	(0)

Senior career*
Years	Team	Apps	(Gls)
2018–2023	Chicago Red Stars	18	(0)
2020	→ HB Køge (loan)	8	(0)

International career
- United States U-18
- United States U-20
2018–2019	United States U-23		
- * Club domestic league appearances and goals

Emily Nicole Boyd (born July 25, 1996) is an American retired professional soccer player.

== College career ==
Boyd played four years for the University of California-Berkeley Golden Bears. During her time at Cal she made 85 appearances and finished with 36 career shutouts, twice setting the Cal single season shutout record. Her freshman year she was named the First Team Freshman All-American and Pac-12 All-Freshman Team. She followed this with All-Pac-12 Second Team honors in her sophomore and junior years. Her senior year she was named to the All-American Second team and All-Pac-12 First team and became the first Cal Bear to win the Pac-12 Goalkeeper of the Year award. While at the University of California-Berkeley Boyd majored in Sports Business and Marketing.

== Professional career ==
Boyd was drafted in round 2, 15th overall, of the 2018 NWSL College Draft by the Chicago Red Stars. She was signed by the team in March 2019. During her first season, 2018, Boyd made 2 starts with 2 shutouts for the Red Stars. Boyd's 2019 season also started off very well, seeing her nominated for the NWSL Save of the Week in two of her first three starts.

She was loaned to HB Køge in August 2020. Boyd was injured on October 3, 2020, suffering a torn anterior cruciate ligament and medial collateral ligament. Boyd returned to Chicago Red Stars in November 2020.

On February 15, 2024, Boyd announced her retirement from professional soccer.

== International career ==
Boyd has been called up to camps by the United States at the U-15, U-18, U-20 and U-23 levels.

== Career statistics ==
=== College ===
Club	Season	Apps	Goals
California	2014	22	0
California	2015	22	0
California	2016	21	0
California	2017	20	0
Career totals		85	0

=== Club ===
Club	Season	League			Cup (Note: Includes the NWSL Challenge Cup and Danish Women's Cup)		Playoffs (Note: Includes NWSL Playoffs)		Other		Total	
Club	Season	Division	Apps	Goals	Apps	Goals	Apps	Goals	Apps	Goals	Apps	Goals
Chicago Red Stars	2018	NWSL	2	0	—		0	0	—		2	0
Chicago Red Stars	2019	NWSL	10	0	—		0	0	—		10	0
Chicago Red Stars	2020	NWSL	—		1	0	—		0 (Note: Includes the NWSL Fall Series)	0	1	0
Chicago Red Stars	2021	NWSL	1	0	0	0	0	0	—		1	0
Chicago Red Stars	2022	NWSL	3	0	0	0	0	0	—		3	0
Chicago Red Stars	2023	NWSL	2	0	3	0	—		—		5	0
HB Køge	2020–21	Kvindeligaen	8	0	0	0	—		—		8	0
Career total			26	0	4	0	0	0	0	0	30	0

== Honors ==
Individual

- Pac-12 Conference Goalkeeper of the Year: 2017
