= Lainey Burdett =

American soccer player (born 1996)

Personal information
- Full name: Elaine Margaret Burdett
- Date of birth: December 22, 1996 (age 29)
- Place of birth: Las Vegas, Nevada
- Height: 5 ft 10 in (1.78 m)
- Position: Goalkeeper

Youth career
- Heat FC

College career
Years	Team	Apps	(Gls)
2015–2018	Arizona Wildcats	57	(0)

Senior career*
Years	Team	Apps	(Gls)
- FC Tucson
2019	Orlando Pride	1	(0)
2022	Åland United	20	(0)
2023	Vittsjö GIK	23	(1)
- * Club domestic league appearances and goals as of August 13, 2022

Elaine Margaret Burdett (born December 22, 1996) is an American soccer player who plays as a goalkeeper.

== Early life ==
Burdett grew up in Las Vegas and played club soccer for Heat FC.

=== Arizona Wildcats ===
Burdett played collegiate soccer at the University of Arizona in the Pac-12 Conference, becoming the winningest goalkeeper in school history and setting a record for most clean sheets in program history with 26 shutouts. She finished with a 79.7% career save percentage.

While in Arizona, Burdett also played with local Women's Premier Soccer League side FC Tucson.

== Professional career ==
=== Orlando Pride ===
Burdett went undrafted in the 2019 NWSL College Draft but joined Orlando Pride on trial during preseason and was signed to the team's supplemental roster on April 10 ahead of the 2019 season. She made her professional debut on October 5, starting in the penultimate game of the season at home to Washington Spirit. Burdett earned an NWSL save of the week award in Orlando's 3–0 loss. Burdett was waived on June 21, 2020, ahead of the start of the 2020 NWSL Challenge Cup.

=== Åland United ===
In December 2021, Burdett signed with Finnish Kansallinen Liiga team Åland United ahead of the 2022 season.

== Career statistics ==
As of August 13, 2022

Club	League	Season	League		Cup		Continental		Total	
Club	League	Season	Apps	Goals	Apps	Goals	Apps	Goals	Apps	Goals
Orlando Pride	NWSL	2019	1	0	—		—		1	0
Åland United	Kansallinen Liiga	2022	13	0	0	0	—		13	0
Career total			14	0	0	0	0	0	14	0
