= 2018 NWSL College Draft =

Soccer draft

General information
- Sport: Soccer
- Date: January 18, 2018
- Time: 11:00 AM ET
- Location: Philadelphia, Pennsylvania

Overview
- 40 total selections in 4 rounds
- First selection: Andi Sullivan, Washington Spirit
- Most selections: Washington Spirit (7 picks)
- Fewest selections: Orlando Pride (2 picks)

The 2018 NWSL College Draft was the sixth annual meeting of National Women's Soccer League (NWSL) franchises to select eligible college players. It was held on January 18, 2018, at the United Soccer Coaches Convention in Philadelphia, Pennsylvania.

== Format ==
- Draft order was determined by the final 2017 regular season standings.

== Results ==
=== Key ===
^{+}	Denotes player who has been selected as NWSL Most Valuable Player
^{*}	Denotes player who has been selected for an NWSL Best XI or NWSL Second XI team
^{^}	Denotes player who has been selected as NWSL Rookie of the Year
^{#}	Denotes player who has never appeared in a competitive NWSL game (regular season, playoff, Challenge Cup, or 2020 Fall Series)

=== Picks ===
Round	Pick	Nat.	Player	Pos.	NWSL team	Notes	College
Round 1	1	(United States)	Andi Sullivan	M	Washington Spirit		Stanford
Round 1	2	(United States)	Savannah McCaskill	F	Boston Breakers		South Carolina
Round 1	3	(Canada)	Quinn (Note: Then known as Rebecca Quinn)	M	Washington Spirit	(Note: Houston Dash → Washington Spirit. January 16, 2018: Washington Spirit acquired Houston's first overall pick 2018 NWSL College Draft in exchange for Lindsay Agnew and the sixth pick in the 2018 NWSL College Draft.)	Duke
Round 1	4	(Cameroon)	Michaela Abam	F	Sky Blue FC (Note: New club Utah Royals FC received FC Kansas City's picks in the 2018 College Draft after FC Kansas City ceased operations.)	(Note: Utah Royals FC → Sky Blue FC. December 29, 2017: Sky Blue FC acquired Shea Groom, Christina Gibbons, and the No. 4 overall pick in the 2018 NWSL College Draft from Utah Royals FC in exchange for Kelley O'Hara, Taylor Lytle, and the No. 25 overall pick in the 2018 NWSL College Draft.)	West Virginia
Round 1	5	(United States)	Imani Dorsey^{^}	F	Sky Blue FC		Duke
Round 1	6	(Canada)	Amandine Pierre-Louis	D	Sky Blue FC	(Note: Seattle Reign FC → Chicago Red Stars → Washington Spirit → Houston Dash → Sky Blue FC. January 12, 2017: Chicago Red Stars acquired Seattle's first overall pick 2018 NWSL College Draft in exchange for the 16th pick in the 2017 NWSL College Draft. August 21, 2017: Chicago Red Stars acquired Kristie Mewis from the Washington Spirit in exchange for the higher of their two picks in the first round of the 2018 NWSL College Draft. January 16, 2018: Washington Spirit acquired Houston's first overall pick 2018 NWSL College Draft in exchange for Lindsay Agnew and the sixth pick in the 2018 NWSL College Draft. January 18, 2018: In a three-team trade, the Chicago Red Stars acquired Sam Kerr, Nikki Stanton and the No. 15 draft pick from Sky Blue FC, as well as the No. 24 draft pick from the Houston Dash, Houston acquired Christen Press, a 2018 international roster spot, and the No. 7 draft pick from Chicago, and Sky Blue acquired Carli Lloyd, Janine Beckie and the No. 6 draft pick from Houston, as well as Jen Hoy and the No. 13 draft pick from Chicago.)	West Virginia
Round 1	7	(United States)	Haley Hanson	M	Houston Dash	(Note: Chicago Red Stars → Houston Dash. January 18, 2018: In a three-team trade, the Chicago Red Stars acquired Sam Kerr, Nikki Stanton and the No. 15 draft pick from Sky Blue FC, as well as the No. 24 draft pick from the Houston Dash, Houston acquired Christen Press, a 2018 international roster spot, and the No. 7 draft pick from Chicago, and Sky Blue acquired Carli Lloyd, Janine Beckie and the No. 6 draft pick from Houston, as well as Jen Hoy and the No. 13 draft pick from Chicago.)	Nebraska
Round 1	8	(United States)	Sandra Yu^{#}	M	Portland Thorns FC	(Note: Orlando Pride → Portland Thorns FC. January 18, 2017: Orlando Pride acquired the NWSL rights to Rachel Hill in exchange for their first- and fourth-round picks in the 2018 NWSL College Draft.)	Notre Dame
Round 1	9	(United States)	Gabby Seiler	M	Portland Thorns FC		Florida
Round 1	10	(United States)	Frannie Crouse	F	North Carolina Courage		Penn State
Round 2	11	(United States)	Schuyler DeBree	D	Washington Spirit		Duke
Round 2	12	(United States)	Kimberly Keever	F	Houston Dash	(Note: Boston Breakers → Seattle Reign FC → Houston Dash. August 31, 2017: Boston Breakers acquired Lindsay Elston and a conditional future pick from Seattle Reign FC in exchange for their 2018 second round pick. August 31, 2017: Seattle Reign FC acquired goalkeeper Lydia Williams from the Houston Dash in exchange for a second-round pick in the 2018 NWSL College Draft.)	Washington
Round 2	13	(United States)	Casey Murphy	G	Sky Blue FC	(Note: Houston Dash → Chicago Red Stars → Sky Blue FC. January 12, 2017: Houston Dash acquired the 28th overall pick in the 2017 NWSL College Draft from the Chicago Red Stars in exchange for a second-round pick in the 2018 NWSL College Draft. January 18, 2018: In a three-team trade, the Chicago Red Stars acquired Sam Kerr, Nikki Stanton and the No. 15 draft pick from Sky Blue FC, as well as the No. 24 draft pick from the Houston Dash, Houston acquired Christen Press, a 2018 international roster spot, and the No. 7 draft pick from Chicago, and Sky Blue acquired Carli Lloyd, Janine Beckie and the No. 6 draft pick from Houston, as well as Jen Hoy and the No. 13 draft pick from Chicago.)	Rutgers
Round 2	14	(United States)	Taylor Isom^{#}	D	Utah Royals FC		BYU
Round 2	15	(United States)	Emily Boyd	G	Chicago Red Stars	(Note: Sky Blue FC → Chicago Red Stars. January 18, 2018: In a three-team trade, the Chicago Red Stars acquired Sam Kerr, Nikki Stanton and the No. 15 draft pick from Sky Blue FC, as well as the No. 24 draft pick from the Houston Dash, Houston acquired Christen Press, a 2018 international roster spot, and the No. 7 draft pick from Chicago, and Sky Blue acquired Carli Lloyd, Janine Beckie and the No. 6 draft pick from Houston, as well as Jen Hoy and the No. 13 draft pick from Chicago.)	California
Round 2	16	(United States)	Mallory Eubanks	F	Washington Spirit	(Note: Seattle Reign FC → Washington Spirit. November 10, 2016: Seattle Reign FC acquired Christine Nairn and the NWSL rights to Madalyn Schiffel from the Washington Spirit in exchange for Havana Solaun, the 3rd and 36th overall picks in the 2017 NWSL College Draft, and a second-round pick in the 2018 NWSL College Draft.)	Mississippi State
Round 2	17	(United States)	Elizabeth Wenger^{#}	D	Boston Breakers	(Note: Chicago Red Stars → Boston Breakers. January 12, 2017: Chicago Red Stars re-acquired the 11th overall pick of the 2017 NWSL College Draft from the Boston Breakers in exchange for a second-round pick in the 2018 NWSL College Draft and a 2018 international roster spot.)	Georgetown
Round 2	18	(United States)	Indigo Gibson^{#}	D	Chicago Red Stars	(Note: Orlando Pride → Chicago Red Stars. February 14, 2017: Orlando Pride acquired a 2017 international roster spot from the Chicago Red Stars in exchange for a second-round pick in the 2018 NWSL College Draft.)	California
Round 2	19	(United States)	Brianna Visalli	M	Chicago Red Stars	(Note: Portland Thorns FC → Chicago Red Stars. January 12, 2017: Portland Thorns FC acquired the 21st overall pick in the 2017 NWSL College Draft from the Chicago Red Stars in exchange for their second- and third-round picks in the 2018 NWSL College Draft.)	Pepperdine
Round 2	20	(United States)	Rebecca Rasmussen^{#}	M	North Carolina Courage		Colorado
Round 3	21	(United States)	Brittany Basinger^{#}	D	Washington Spirit		Penn State
Round 3	22	(United States)	Ashton Miller^{#}	M	Boston Breakers		Duke
Round 3	23	(Portugal)	Nádia Gomes	F	Orlando Pride	(Note: Houston Dash → Orlando Pride. April 18, 2017: Houston Dash acquired Camille Levin from the Orlando Pride in exchange for a third-round pick in the 2018 NWSL College Draft.)	BYU
Round 3	24	(United States)	Megan Buckingham^{#}	M	Chicago Red Stars	(Note: FC Kansas City → Houston Dash → Chicago Red Stars. March 10, 2017: FC Kansas City acquired Rebecca Moros from the Houston Dash in exchange for their highest third-round pick in the 2018 NWSL College Draft. January 18, 2018: In a three-team trade, the Chicago Red Stars acquired Sam Kerr, Nikki Stanton and the No. 15 draft pick from Sky Blue FC, as well as the No. 24 draft pick from the Houston Dash, Houston acquired Christen Press, a 2018 international roster spot, and the No. 7 draft pick from Chicago, and Sky Blue acquired Carli Lloyd, Janine Beckie and the No. 6 draft pick from Houston, as well as Jen Hoy and the No. 13 draft pick from Chicago.)	North Carolina
Round 3	25	(Canada)	Ally Haran	D	Seattle Reign FC	(Note: Sky Blue FC → Utah Royals FC → Seattle Reign FC. December 29, 2017: Utah Royals FC acquired Kelley O'Hara, Taylor Lytle, and the No. 25 overall pick in the 2018 NWSL College Draft from Sky Blue FC in exchange for Shea Groom, Christina Gibbons, and the No. 4 overall pick in the 2018 NWSL College Draft. January 18, 2018: Seattle Reign FC acquired Yael Averbuch and the No. 25 overall pick in the 2018 NWSL College Draft from Utah Royals FC in exchange for Diana Matheson.)	Wake Forest
Round 3	26	(United States)	Maddie Huster^{#}	M	Washington Spirit	(Note: Seattle Reign FC → Washington Spirit. January 3, 2017: Seattle Reign FC acquired Diana Matheson from the Washington Spirit in exchange for the NWSL rights to Arielle Ship and a third-round pick in the 2018 NWSL College Draft.)	Wake Forest
Round 3	27	(United States)	Zoey Goralski	D	Chicago Red Stars		UCLA
Round 3	28	(United States)	Veronica Latsko	F	Houston Dash	(Note: Orlando Pride → Houston Dash. January 23, 2017: Orlando Pride acquired Chioma Ubogagu from the Houston Dash in exchange for a third-round pick in the 2018 NWSL College Draft.)	Virginia
Round 3	29	(United States)	Bella Geist ^{*}	G	Portland Thorns FC	(Note: Portland Thorns FC → Chicago Red Stars. January 12, 2017: Portland Thorns FC acquired the 21st overall pick in the 2017 NWSL College Draft from the Chicago Red Stars in exchange for their second-round and third-round picks in the 2018 NWSL College Draft.)	Oregon State
Round 3	30	(United States)	Abby Elinsky	M	Houston Dash	(Note: North Carolina Courage → Houston Dash. December 23, 2017: Western New York Flash acquired the NWSL rights to Rosana in exchange for a third-round pick in the 2018 NWSL College Draft.)	North Carolina
Round 4	31	(United States)	Rachel Moore^{#}	M	Washington Spirit		William & Mary
Round 4	32	(United States)	Joanna Boyles	M	Boston Breakers		North Carolina
Round 4	33	(United States)	Sarah Shimer^{#}	G	Houston Dash		Washington
Round 4	34	(United States)	Emma Jane Proctor^{#}	G	Utah Royals FC		Duke
Round 4	35	(Mexico)	Kiana Palacios	F	Sky Blue FC		UC Irvine
Round 4	36	(Spain)	Celia Jiménez	D	Seattle Reign FC		Alabama
Round 4	37	(United States)	Alexa Ben^{#}	M	Chicago Red Stars		DePaul
Round 4	38	(United States)	Morgan Reid	D	North Carolina Courage	(Note: Orlando Pride → Portland Thorns FC → North Carolina Courage. January 18, 2017: Orlando Pride acquired the NWSL rights to Rachel Hill in exchange for their first- and fourth-round picks in the 2018 NWSL College Draft. March 8, 2017: Portland Thorns FC acquired Britt Eckerstrom from the North Carolina Courage in exchange for two fourth-round picks in the 2018 NWSL College Draft.)	Duke
Round 4	39	(United States)	Carlin Hudson	D	North Carolina Courage	(Note: Portland Thorns FC → North Carolina Courage. March 8, 2017: Portland Thorns FC acquired Britt Eckerstrom from the North Carolina Courage in exchange for two fourth-round picks in the 2018 NWSL College Draft.)	Yale
Round 4	40	(United States)	Ryan Williams ^{*}	D	North Carolina Courage		TCU

=== Notable undrafted players ===
Below is a list of undrafted rookies who appeared in a competitive NWSL game in 2018.

Nat.	Player	Pos.	Original NWSL team	College	Notes
(United States)	Elizabeth Ball	D	Portland Thorns FC	Penn State	
(United States)	Bridget Callahan	M	Orlando Pride	UCF	

== Trades ==
Round 1:

Round 2:

Round 3:

Round 4:

== Summary ==
In 2018, a total of 27 colleges had players selected. Of these, six had a player drafted to the NWSL for the first time: Alabama, Oregon State, TCU, UC Irvine, Washington and Yale.

=== Schools with multiple draft selections ===
Selections	Schools
6	Duke
3	North Carolina
2	BYU, California, Penn State, Wake Forest, Washington, West Virginia

=== Selections by college athletic conference ===
Conference	Round 1	Round 2	Round 3	Round 4	Total
ACC	3	1	6	3	13
Big East	0	1	0	1	2
Big Ten	2	1	1	0	4
Big West	0	0	0	1	1
Big 12	2	0	0	1	3
Colonial	0	0	0	1	1
Ivy League	0	0	0	1	1
Pac-12	1	4	2	1	8
SEC	2	1	0	1	4
West Coast	0	2	1	0	3

=== Selections by position ===
Position	Round 1	Round 2	Round 3	Round 4	Total
Goalkeeper	0	2	1	2	5
Defender	1	4	3	4	12
Midfielder	5	2	4	3	14
Forward	4	2	2	1	9

== See also ==
- List of NWSL drafts
- List of National Women's Soccer League draftees by college team
- 2017 National Women's Soccer League season
