= Jordan Baggett =

American soccer player (born 1996)

- Baggett with Racing Louisville in 2025

Personal information
- Birth name: Jordan Elisabeth DiBiasi
- Date of birth: October 28, 1996 (age 30)
- Place of birth: Highlands Ranch, Colorado, United States
- Height: 5 ft 6 in (1.68 m)
- Position: Midfielder

Team information
- Current team: Denver Summit
- Number: 15

Youth career
- Colorado Rush

College career
Years	Team	Apps	(Gls)
2015–2018	Stanford Cardinal	92	(31)

Senior career*
Years	Team	Apps	(Gls)
2019–2023	Washington Spirit	35	(5)
2023–2025	Racing Louisville FC	13	(1)
2026–	Denver Summit	0	(0)

International career
2016	United States U20		
2017–2019	United States U23		
- * Club domestic league appearances and goals as of 22:05, December 11, 2025 (UTC)

Jordan Elisabeth Baggett (née DiBiasi; born October 28, 1996) is an American professional soccer player who plays as a midfielder for Denver Summit FC of the National Women's Soccer League (NWSL) Baggett played college soccer for the Stanford Cardinal and helped the team win the 2017 national championship. She was drafted third overall by the Washington Spirit in the 2019 NWSL College Draft. She has also played for Racing Louisville FC.

== College career ==
During her freshman season at Stanford, Baggett started all 23 games in the midfield. She scored the game-winning goal against USC to clinch the Pac-12 title. Baggett was named to the Pac-12 All-Freshman Team. In her sophomore season she played in 20 games and scored 7 goals.

Baggett started all 25 games in her junior year. She scored 9 goals, 6 of which were game winners. She scored the only 2 goals in Stanford's 2–0 win over South Carolina in the College Cup semi-final. Stanford won the 2017 College Cup and Baggett was named to the College Cup All-Tournament team and the All-Pac-12 second team. Baggett was named team captain in her senior season with Stanford. She was named 2018 Pac-12 Midfielder of the Year and was a finalist for the Hermann Trophy, her Stanford teammate Catarina Macario won the award.

== Club career ==
=== Washington Spirit ===
At the 2019 NWSL College Draft, the Washington Spirit traded three players and a fourth round draft pick to Sky Blue FC to acquire the 3rd overall pick in the draft. The Spirit used this draft pick to select Baggett. On March 4, 2019, Washington announced that Baggett had signed a contract with the club. She came third in voting for NWSL Rookie of the Year following the 2019 season. During the 2022 Challenge Cup, Baggett collided with North Carolina Courage striker Debinha and was stretchered off the field. While the medical team brought the stretcher over, multiple Spirit players ran with the cart to try to bring it to Baggett faster. The Spirit later announced Baggett was discharged from the hospital and was in concussion protocol.

On January 18, 2023, the Spirit re-signed Baggett to a new two-year contract with an option for 2025, however the club would later trade her to Racing Louisville FC on April 25, 2023. Across her four full seasons with the Spirit, Baggett appeared in 42 matches, scored five goals, and had one assist. She was a part of the 2021 Spirit team that won the club's first-ever NWSL Championship.

=== Racing Louisville ===
On April 25, 2023, the Spirit traded Baggett to Racing Louisville FC in exchange for Racing's second-round pick in the 2024 NWSL Draft and a third-round pick in the 2025 NWSL Draft. She departed from Louisville upon the expiry of her contract.

=== Denver Summit ===
On December 9, 2025, Denver Summit FC signed Baggett to a one-year contract ahead of its inaugural season in the NWSL.

== International career ==
Baggett is a United States youth international at the U20 and U23 levels.

Baggett received her first call-up to the United States women's national soccer team in December 2019.

== Personal life ==
Formerly Jordan DiBiasi, she married Ben Baggett, a former Stanford baseball player, in January 2022, and began playing under her married name.

== Honors ==
Stanford Cardinal

- NCAA Division I Women's Soccer Championship: 2017

Washington Spirit

- NWSL Championship: 2021

Individual

- Pac-12 Conference Midfielder of the Year: 2018
