= Marc Skinner =

English football coach

- Skinner in 2025

Personal information
- Date of birth: 23 March 1983 (age 43)
- Place of birth: Birmingham, England

Managerial career
- Years: Team
- 2013–2016: Solihull College (youth)
- 2015–2016: Birmingham City Women (youth)
- 2016–2019: Birmingham City Women
- 2019–2021: Orlando Pride
- 2021–2026: Manchester United Women

Marc Skinner (born 23 March 1983) is an English professional football coach who was most recently the manager of Manchester United Women in the FA Women's Super League.

Having been involved with their youth set-up, Skinner went on to manage the Birmingham City Women first team before moving to the United States to manage Orlando Pride in the NWSL. He holds a UEFA A Licence.

== Coaching career ==
=== Solihull College ===
Formerly a teacher, Skinner was football academy manager at Solihull College which opened a ladies-only academy and regional talent hub linked to professional team Birmingham City in 2013.

=== Birmingham City Women ===
Skinner had held various roles at Birmingham City since 2006 including technical director, reserve team head coach and first-team goalkeeping coach. In December 2016, he was promoted to the position of head coach of the first team. Upon the appointment he said "Since I found out I haven’t stopped smiling, this club is deep in my heart. I am extremely proud to lead this fantastic team and I am hoping to continue the success there already been in the past." The FA WSL was in the middle of a switch to the traditional autumn-to-spring calendar and, as a result, Skinner's first campaign was the shortened 8-game Spring Series from February–May 2017 where Birmingham finished 7th. The team also made the FA Cup final. The Blues improved to a 5th-place finish in the 2017–18 season.

Upon his departure in January 2019, Skinner's Birmingham side sat 4th in the WSL table. He was credited with turning around the Blues’ style of play - creating a well-organized and defensively sound system while implementing a dominant attacking style on a small budget compared to Manchester City, Arsenal and Chelsea who were above them.

=== Orlando Pride ===
On 14 January 2019, Skinner was announced as head coach of Orlando Pride, a team he called "one of the biggest clubs in the world." He became the team's second ever head coach following the departure of Tom Sermanni at the end of 2018. After a difficult start having failed to win any of his opening nine games, Skinner earned his first win as Orlando head coach on 22 June in a 2–1 victory over Sky Blue FC. In his debut campaign, Orlando finished bottom of the league with a franchise record-low 16 points. With the 2020 season disrupted by the COVID-19 pandemic, Orlando Pride saw their schedule reduced to four Fall Series matches. The team failed to win any of them but notably ended the series in dramatic fashion with a second-half comeback from three goals down to tie with North Carolina Courage. After finishing third of five teams in the group stage of the 2021 NWSL Challenge Cup, Orlando picked up 15 points in seven games during an unbeaten start to the regular season, the longest unbeaten start in club history. Combined with the two unbeaten games at the end of the Challenge Cup, the nine game streak matched Orlando's record all-time unbeaten run in all competitions set in October 2017. He stepped down on 23 July 2021, amid reports he had agreed terms with Manchester United.

=== Manchester United ===
On 29 July 2021, Skinner returned to the FA WSL to become the second head coach of Manchester United, taking over from Casey Stoney following her resignation in May 2021. He signed a two-year contract with the option for a third. Under Skinner's tenure, Manchester United finished second in the 2022–23 WSL season, their highest finish in the league to date, as well as runners-up in the FA Cup that same season. This finish also saw the club reach the UEFA Champions League qualifying rounds for the first time, though they failed to advance to the group stages after being defeated by Paris Saint-Germain across both second round qualification legs the following season.

Despite an underwhelming 2023–24 league campaign, which saw the club finish fifth in their lowest placement to date, this season saw Skinner win his first silverware as a manager as Manchester United won the 2024 FA Cup final on 12 May. He signed a one-year extension with the option for a further year on 17 May 2024. On 2 April 2025, Skinner signed a further contract extension with United, keeping him at the club until 2027 with the option for an additional year. In the 2025–26 season, Skinner led United to full qualification for the Champions League for the first time in the club's history, with the team ultimately reaching the quarter-finals of the competition. They also reached their fourth domestic cup final, finishing as runners-up in the League Cup.

On 3 August 2026, United announced that Skinner had left his role by mutual agreement.

== Personal life ==
Skinner is in a long-term relationship with former England international defender Laura Bassett having met while both coaching for Birmingham's U-14s team. Their daughter, Saede, was born in December 2018. The couple's second child was born in March 2024.

== Managerial statistics ==
All competitive games (league and domestic cups) are included.

As of 16 May 2026

Managerial record by team and tenure
Team	Nation	From	To	Record							
Team	Nation	From	To	P	W	D	L	GF	GA	GD	Win %
Birmingham City W.F.C.	England	14 December 2016	13 January 2019	54	26	11	17	76	51	+25	48.15
Orlando Pride	United States	14 January 2019	23 July 2021	43	9	12	22	46	77	−31	20.93
Manchester United W.F.C.	England	29 July 2021	3 August 2026	166	101	30	35	351	164	+187	60.84
Career totals				263	136	53	74	473	292	+181	51.71

== Honours ==
Birmingham City

- Women's FA Cup runner-up: 2016–17

Manchester United

- Women's FA Cup: 2023–24; runner-up: 2022–23, 2024–25
- Women's League Cup runner-up: 2025–26

Individual

- Women's Super League Manager of the Month: December 2021, January 2022, October 2022, December 2022, April 2023
