= 2020 NWSL Challenge Cup Championship =

Championship game of the 2020 NWSL Challenge Cup

Championship, presented by Budweiser, of the 2020 National Women's Soccer League Challenge Cup presented by P&G and Secret
- Event: 2020 NWSL Challenge Cup
Houston Dash	Chicago Red Stars
2	0
- Date: July 26, 2020
- Venue: Rio Tinto Stadium, Sandy, Utah
- Woman of the Match: Shea Groom, HOU
- Referee: Katja Koroleva
- Attendance: 0 (Behind closed doors)

The 2020 NWSL Challenge Cup Championship was a soccer match held on July 26, 2020, at the Rio Tinto Stadium in Sandy, Utah. It was the final match of the 2020 NWSL Challenge Cup, a one-off competition marking the resumption of the 2020 National Women's Soccer League season following the initial wave of the COVID-19 pandemic. The match was played behind closed doors due to the pandemic and was broadcast on CBS beginning at 12:30 ET.

Houston Dash won the match 2–0 against Chicago Red Stars to win the tournament.

== Road to the final ==
The 2020 NWSL Challenge Cup was a one-off tournament during the 2020 NWSL season to mark the league's return to action from the COVID-19 pandemic. Eight National Women's Soccer League teams participated in the tournament. The tournament, played behind closed doors in the Salt Lake City area, began on June 27 with a preliminary round, followed by a knockout round.

Note: In all results below, the score of the finalist is given first.

Houston Dash		Round	Chicago Red Stars	
Opponent	Result	Preliminary round	Opponent	Result
Utah Royals FC	3–3	Match 1	Washington Spirit	1–2
OL Reign	2–0	Match 2	Portland Thorns FC	0–0
Sky Blue FC	0–2	Match 3	North Carolina Courage	0–1
Washington Spirit	0–1	Match 4	Utah Royals FC	1–0
Pos / Team / Pld / Pts; 2 / Washington Spirit / 4 / 7; 3 / OL Reign / 4 / 5; 4 / Houston Dash / 4 / 4; 5 / Utah Royals FC (H) / 4 / 4; 6 / Chicago Red Stars / 4 / 4; Source: NWSL (H) Host		Final standings	Pos / Team / Pld / Pts; 4 / Houston Dash / 4 / 4; 5 / Utah Royals FC (H) / 4 / 4; 6 / Chicago Red Stars / 4 / 4; 7 / Sky Blue FC / 4 / 4; 8 / Portland Thorns FC / 4 / 3; Source: NWSL (H) Host	
Opponent	Result	Knockout round	Opponent	Result
Utah Royals FC	0–0 (3–2 p)	Quarter-finals	OL Reign	0–0 (4–3 p)
Portland Thorns FC	1–0	Semi-finals	Sky Blue FC	3–2

== Match ==
=== Details ===
July 26, 2020
12:30 ET

Houston Dash	2–0	Chicago Red Stars
Schmidt 5' (pen.); Groom 90+1'	Report

Rio Tinto Stadium, Sandy, Utah
Attendance: 0 (Behind closed doors)
Referee: Katja Koroleva

Houston Dash	Chicago Red Stars

GK	1	(United States) Jane Campbell
RB	9	(United States) Haley Hanson	(yellow card) 82'
CB	11	(United States) Megan Oyster
CB	25	(United States) Katie Naughton
LB	2	(Canada) Allysha Chapman
CM	6	(United States) Shea Groom
CM	13	(Canada) Sophie Schmidt
CM	19	(United States) Kristie Mewis		(substituted off) 29'
RW	8	(Canada) Nichelle Prince		(substituted off) 87'
CF	3	(England) Rachel Daly (c)
LW	14	(United States) Brianna Visalli		(substituted off) 78'
Substitutes:
GK	20	(United States) Lindsey Harris
GK	99	(United States) Amanda Dennis
DF	17	(United States) Erin Simon	(yellow card) 89'	(substituted on) 87'
DF	23	(United States) Ally Prisock
MF	5	(United States) CeCe Kizer		(substituted on) 29'
MF	10	(United States) Christine Nairn
MF	28	(United States) Cami Privett
FW	4	(Canada) Maegan Kelly
FW	7	(United States) Katie Stengel
FW	12	(United States) Veronica Latsko		(substituted on) 78'
FW	16	(Jamaica) Kayla McCoy
FW	24	(United States) Jamia Fields
FW	26	(United States) Bridgette Andrzejewski
Manager:
(England) James Clarkson

GK	1	(United States) Alyssa Naeher
RB	28	(United States) Kayla Sharples	(yellow card) 4'	(substituted off) 68'
CB	11	(United States) Sarah Gorden
CB	8	(United States) Julie Ertz (c)
LB	29	(Canada) Bianca St. Georges		(substituted off) 89'
CM	24	(United States) Danielle Colaprico
CM	10	(United States) Vanessa DiBernardo
CM	9	(United States) Savannah McCaskill		(substituted off) 78'
RW	2	(United States) Kealia Watt
CF	5	(United States) Rachel Hill
LW	33	(Mexico) Katie Johnson		(substituted off) 79'
Substitutes:
GK	21	(United States) Emily Boyd
GK	38	(United States) Cassie Miller
DF	14	(United States) Zoe Morse		(substituted on) 79'
DF	23	(United States) Julia Bingham		(substituted on) 89'
DF	30	(United States) Hannah Davison
DF	32	(United States) Zoey Goralski		(substituted on) 68'
MF	25	(United States) Cassie Rohan
FW	7	(United States) Michele Vasconcelos
FW	15	(United States) Makenzy Doniak		(substituted on) 78'
FW	19	(United States) Sarah Luebbert
FW	22	(United States) Zoe Redei
Manager:
(United States) Rory Dames

Woman of the Match:
Shea Groom, HOU
Assistant referees:
Jennifer Garner
Tiffini Turpin
Fourth official:
Tori Penso

Match rules

- 90 minutes.
- Penalty shoot-out if scores level.
- Maximum of five substitutions. (Note: Each team was given only three opportunities to make substitutions, excluding substitutions made at half-time.)

== Broadcasting ==
The match aired on CBS and CBS All Access in the United States and Canada, and on Twitch internationally. Jenn Hildreth and Lori Lindsey served as play-by-play announcer and analyst respectively on CBS, reporting remotely, while Mike Watts and Jen Cooper did the same on Twitch. Marisa Pilla was the on-field reporter. Most of the show's production staff operated off-site, including a fully remote integration model production, due to the impact of the COVID-19 pandemic on television in the United States.

CBS Sports soccer reporter Sandra Herrera and studio host Sherree Burruss hosted the pre- and post-game shows on CBS Sports HQ along with Aly Wagner. Alex Morgan also joined the pregame show.

The match registered a 0.44 Nielsen rating and 653,000 viewers, becoming the league's largest-ever domestic broadcast audience. The match viewership represented a 293-percent increase over the 2019 NWSL Championship match.
