= 2020 Chicago Red Stars season =

Chicago Red Stars
2020 season
- Chairman: Arnim Whisler
- Manager: Rory Dames
- Stadium: SeatGeek Stadium; Bridgeview, Illinois
- Regular season: Abandoned
- Challenge Cup: Runner-up
- Fall Series: 6th
Home colours	Away colours

The 2020 Chicago Red Stars season was the team's twelfth season, and its eighth season in the National Women's Soccer League (NWSL), the top tier of women's soccer in the United States. Due to the impact of the COVID-19 pandemic on sports, on March 20, 2020, the NWSL indefinitely postponed the start of the league's regular season.

== Team ==
=== Coaching staff ===
Position	Staff
Head coach	Rory Dames
Assistant coach	Scott Parkinson
Assistant coach	Julianne Sitch
Goalkeeper coach	Rade Tanaskovic

Last updated: September 27, 2020
Source: http://chicagoredstars.com/technical-staff/

=== Squad ===
First-team squad, NWSL Fall Series
No.	Nat.	Player	Nation
1	GK	USA	Alyssa Naeher
2	FW	USA	Kealia Watt
3	DF	USA	Arin Wright
4	MF	USA	Alyssa Mautz
5	FW	USA	Rachel Hill
6	DF	USA	Casey Short
7	MF	USA	Michele Vasconcelos
8	MF	USA	Julie Ertz
9	FW	USA	Savannah McCaskill
10	MF	USA	Vanessa DiBernardo
11	DF	USA	Sarah Gorden
12	FW	JPN	Yūki Nagasato
13	MF	USA	Morgan Brian
14	DF	USA	Zoe Morse
15	FW	USA	Makenzy Doniak
16	MF	USA	Camryn Biegalski
18	MF	USA	Ella Stevens
19	FW	USA	Sarah Luebbert
21	GK	USA	Emily Boyd
22	FW	USA	Zoe Redei
23	DF	USA	Julia Bingham
24	MF	USA	Danielle Colaprico
25	MF	USA	Cassie Rohan
26	DF	USA	Tierna Davidson
28	DF	USA	Kayla Sharples
29	DF	CAN	Bianca St-Georges
30	DF	USA	Hannah Davison
32	FW	USA	Zoey Goralski
33	FW	MEX	Katie Johnson
38	GK	USA	Cassie Miller

== Competitions ==
=== Challenge Cup ===
==== Preliminary round ====
27 June 2020 1	Chicago Red Stars	1–2	Washington Spirit	Herriman, Utah
8 p.m. MDT	Gautrat 51'	Report	Lavelle 8'; Hatch 46'	Stadium: Zions Bank Stadium; Referee: Katja Koroleva

1 July 2020 2	Portland Thorns FC	0–0	Chicago Red Stars	Herriman, Utah
10:30 a.m. MDT		Report		Stadium: Zions Bank Stadium; Referee: Danielle Chesky

5 July 2020 3	North Carolina Courage	1–0	Chicago Red Stars	Herriman, Utah
10:30 a.m. MDT	Erceg 81'	Report		Stadium: Zions Bank Stadium; Referee: Danielle Chesky

12 July 2020 4	Chicago Red Stars	1–0	Utah Royals FC	Herriman, Utah
8:00 p.m. MDT		Report	Short 85'	Stadium: Zions Bank Stadium; Referee: Michael Radchuk

===== Standings =====
Pos	Team	Pld	W	D	L	GF	GA	GD	Pts
1	North Carolina Courage	4	4	0	0	7	1	+6	12
2	Washington Spirit	4	2	1	1	4	4	0	7
3	OL Reign	4	1	2	1	1	2	−1	5
4	Houston Dash	4	1	1	2	5	6	−1	4
5	Utah Royals FC (H)	4	1	1	2	4	5	−1	4
6	Chicago Red Stars	4	1	1	2	2	3	−1	4 (Note: Chicago Red Stars won the tiebreaker against Sky Blue FC on fewer yellow cards (1 to 4).)
7	Sky Blue FC	4	1	1	2	2	3	−1	4
8	Portland Thorns FC	4	0	3	1	2	3	−1	3

Source: NWSL
Rules for classification: Tiebreakers
(H) Host

==== Knockout round ====
18 July 2020 QF	OL Reign	0–0 (3–4 p)	Chicago Red Stars	Herriman, Utah
8:00 p.m. MDT		Report		Stadium: Zions Bank Stadium
	Penalties
	Cruz (penalty missed); Momiki (penalty scored); Jenkins (penalty scored); Balcer (penalty scored); Barnes (penalty missed)		(penalty scored) Ertz; (penalty scored) DiBernardo; (penalty scored) Watt; (penalty scored) Hill

22 July 2020 SF	Chicago Red Stars	3–2	Sky Blue FC	Sandy, Utah
8:00 p.m. MDT	St-Georges 8'; Hill 11'; McCaskill 60'	Report	Viens 72'; Ertz 77' (o.g.)	Stadium: Rio Tinto Stadium

=== Championship ===
July 26, 2020
12:30 ET

Houston Dash	2–0	Chicago Red Stars
Schmidt 5' (pen.); Groom 90+1'	Report

Rio Tinto Stadium, Sandy, Utah
Attendance: 0 (Behind closed doors)
Referee: Katja Koroleva

=== 2020 Fall Series ===
12 September 2020 1	Washington Spirit	2–1	Chicago Red Stars	Leesburg, Virginia
	Feist 71'; Scarpa 90+3' (Thomas)	Report	Luebbert 26' (Watt); McCaskill (yellow card) 27' (yellow-red card) 42'	Stadium: Segra Field

20 September 2020 2	Chicago Red Stars	4–1	Sky Blue FC	Bridgeview, Illinois
	Watt 10' (DiBernardo), 57' (Luebbert); Goralski 28' (Brian); DiBernardo 44' (Watt); Davison (yellow card) 90+1'	Report	Onumonu 6'; Monaghan (yellow card) 47'; Cudjoe (yellow card) 67'	Stadium: SeatGeek Stadium

26 September 2020 3	Chicago Red Stars	1–1	Washington Spirit	Bridgeview, Illinois
	McCaskill 72' (Luebbert)	Report	McClure (yellow card) 30'; Hellstrom (yellow card) 63'; Thomas 88'	Stadium: SeatGeek Stadium

10 October 2020 4	Sky Blue FC	3–1	Chicago Red Stars	Montclair, New Jersey
	Monaghan 25' (Purce), 45+2' (Purce); Onumonu 35' (Monaghan); Skroski (yellow card) 51'	Report	Davidson (yellow card) 12'; Brian 89' (Davidson)	Stadium: MSU Soccer Park at Pittser Field

==== Standings ====
Pos	Team	Pld	W	D	L	GF	GA	GD	Pts	Qualification
1	Portland Thorns FC (C)	4	3	1	0	10	3	+7	10	Community Shield
2	Houston Dash	4	3	0	1	12	7	+5	9	Runners-up
3	Washington Spirit	4	2	1	1	5	4	+1	7	Third place
4	Sky Blue FC	4	2	0	2	6	7	−1	6	
5	North Carolina Courage	4	1	2	1	8	10	−2	5	
6	Chicago Red Stars	4	1	1	2	7	7	0	4	
7	OL Reign	4	1	1	2	6	8	−2	4	
8	Orlando Pride	4	0	2	2	5	8	−3	2	
9	Utah Royals FC	4	0	2	2	3	8	−5	2	

Source: NWSL
Rules for classification: Tiebreakers
(C) Champions

== Transactions ==
=== College Draft ===
Draft picks are not automatically signed to the team roster. The 2020 NWSL College Draft was held on January 16, 2020.

R	Pick	Nat.	Player	Pos.	College	Status	Ref.
2	15	(United States)	Julia Bingham	DF	University of Southern California		
2	16	(United States)	Camryn Biegalski	FW	University of Wisconsin—Madison		
3	19	(United States)	Zoe Morse	MF	University of Virginia		
3	24	(United States)	Ella Stevens	FW	Duke University		
4	35	(United States)	Aerial Chavarin	FW	Yale University		

=== Expansion Draft ===
The 2020 NWSL Expansion Draft was a special draft held on November 12, 2020, by the National Women's Soccer League (NWSL) for Racing Louisville FC, an expansion team, to select players from existing teams in the league. The league allowed Louisville to select up to 18 players from lists of unprotected players provided by the existing nine NWSL teams.

Chicago traded Yūki Nagasato and Savannah McCaskill to Racing Louisville in exchange for full roster protection in the draft.

== See also ==
- 2020 National Women's Soccer League season
- 2020 in American soccer
