= Kayla Sharples =

American soccer player (born 1997)

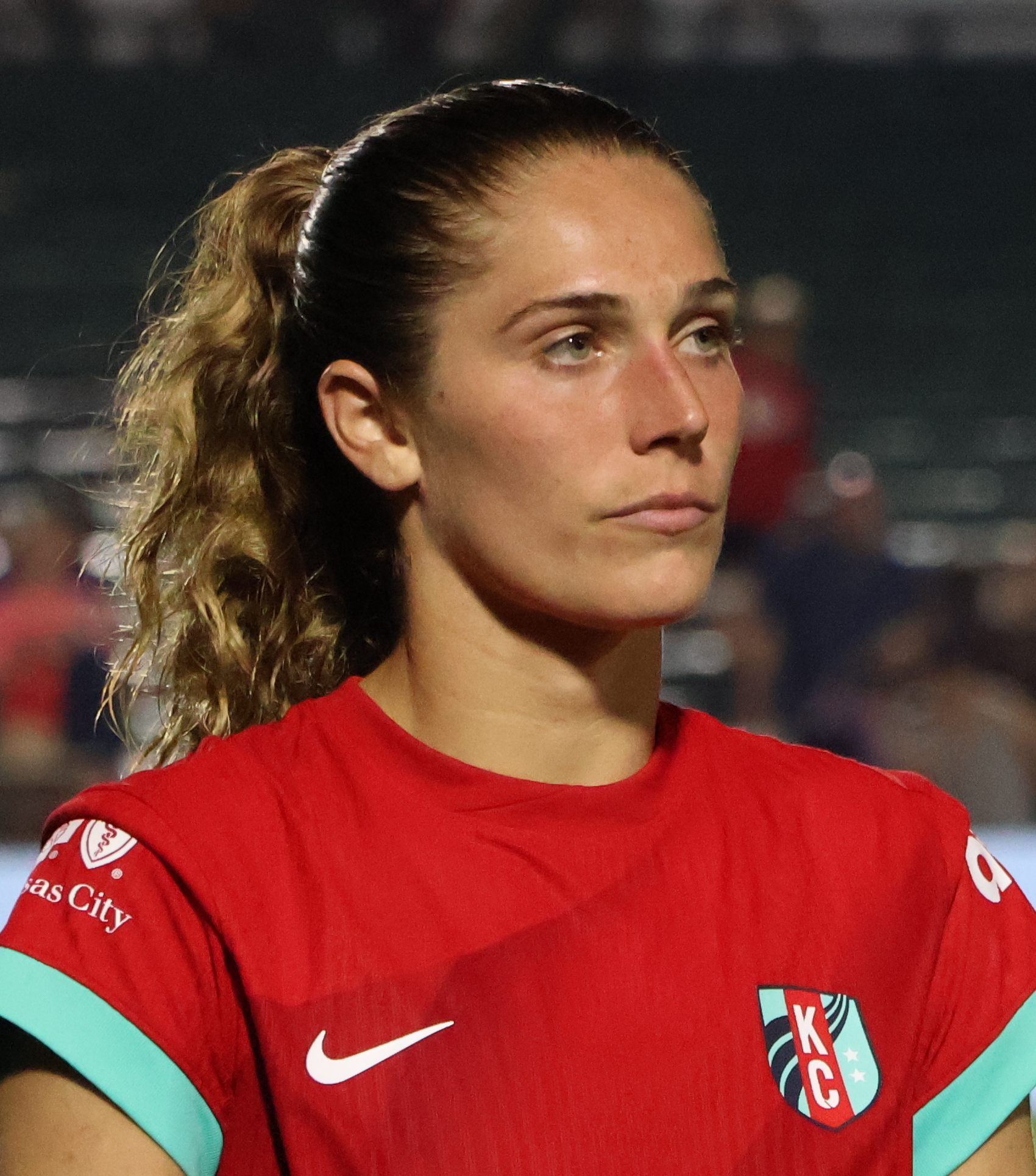
- Sharples with the Kansas City Current in 2024

Personal information
- Full name: Kayla Lynne Sharples
- Date of birth: June 17, 1997 (age 29)
- Place of birth: Naperville, Illinois, U.S.
- Height: 5 ft 11 in (1.80 m)
- Position: Center back

Team information
- Current team: Kansas City Current
- Number: 27

Youth career
- Eclipse Select

College career
Years	Team	Apps	(Gls)
2015–2018	Northwestern Wildcats	87	(9)

Senior career*
Years	Team	Apps	(Gls)
2019–2023	Chicago Red Stars	35	(1)
2020	→ KuPS (loan)	6	(1)
2021–2022	→ Adelaide United (loan)	11	(1)
2024	Bay FC	15	(2)
2024–	Kansas City Current	59	(3)
- * Club domestic league appearances and goals as of 16:51, November 14, 2026 (UTC)

Kayla Lynne Sharples (born June 17, 1997) is an American professional soccer player who plays as a center back for the Kansas City Current of the National Women's Soccer League (NWSL). She played college soccer for the Northwestern Wildcats and was drafted by hometown club Chicago Red Stars in the third round of the 2019 NWSL College Draft. She spent five seasons with Chicago, including loans to Finland's KuPS and Australia's Adelaide United, before joining expansion team Bay FC in 2024. Later that year she was traded to the Current.

== Early life ==
Sharples was born in Naperville, Illinois, and attended Naperville North High School where she played basketball and soccer, winning a state championship in soccer as a freshman in 2010. She played club soccer with Eclipse Select, winning multiple state championships. Her Chicago Red Stars jersey is displayed outside of Naperville North's gym, among jerseys of other professional athlete alumni.

=== Northwestern Wildcats ===
Sharples attended Northwestern University where she played for the Northwestern Wildcats. She led the Wildcats to four straight NCAA Tournament appearances between 2015 and 2018, a best in program history. Their furthest NCAA appearance came in the 2016 tournament, reaching the Round of 16 where they ultimate fell to the #3 seed Duke Blue Devils. It was the Northwestern's best NCAA tournament appearance since 1998. Sharples started all 87 of her matches for Northwestern, which included a streak of 86 straight starts, which is the second longest such streak in program history.

== Club career ==
=== Chicago Red Stars ===
Sharples was selected 26th overall in the 2019 NWSL College Draft by the Chicago Red Stars, her hometown team. She made her professional debut on June 2, 2019, as a substitute in a 3–0 loss away to the Portland Thorns FC. Sharples had limited minutes in the 2020 NWSL Challenge Cup, but started in the final where the Red Stars lost the inaugural Challenge Cup Championship to the Houston Dash. She suffered a season ending ACL injury on June 12, 2022, in a match against the Orlando Pride. She made her return from injury on May 31, 2023, as a substitute during a Challenge Cup group stage match against Racing Louisville FC.

==== KuPS loan (2020) ====
In August 2020 Sharples received an offer to join Kuopion Palloseura on loan for the remainder of the 2020 Kansallinen Liiga season. After consulting with Chicago head coach Rory Dames who told her that she may not get playing time in the 2020 NWSL Fall Series, Sharples accepted the offer. She made six total appearances, scoring one goal, contributing to KuPS's third place finish that season, the highest ever for the club in their history.

==== Adelaide United loan (2021–22) ====
In December 2021, Sharples was loaned to Australian club Adelaide United, just before the beginning of the 2021–22 A-League Women season. Sharples stated that it had been a goal of hers to play in Australia due to the quality of the league. Sharples missed the start of the season due to quarantine protocols upon entering Australia due to the ongoing COVID-19 pandemic. Following her quarantine, she started in 11 of Adelaide's 14 regular season matches, scoring one goal in a 3–0 win away to Western Sydney Wanderers on January 28, 2022. Sharples was part of a squad that led the club to their first ever Finals appearance in fourteen A-League seasons. On March 13, Sharples started in the club's finals debut, but Adelaide ultimately lost 1–2 to eventual 2022 A-League grand final champion Melbourne Victory. Following the loss, her loan concluded and she returned to the Chicago Red Stars to prepare for the 2022 NWSL season.

=== Bay FC ===
On December 21, 2023, Sharples signed with NWSL expansion side Bay FC, having become a free agent after her contract with Chicago expired. She was part of Bay FC's inaugural starting eleven in their first regular season NWSL match, which was a win away to Angel City FC.

=== Kansas City Current ===
Sharples was traded on August 28, 2024, to the Kansas City Current for goalkeeper Jordan Silkowitz and $15,000 in allocation money. She was immediately a starter for the Current, debuting in a 1–0 win over the Utah Royals on September 7. Her arrival was credited with improving the Current's defensive performance. Kansas City placed fourth in the standings and won 1–0 over the North Carolina Courage in the quarterfinals. On November 17, in the semifinals against the Orlando Pride, Sharples was partly responsible for two goals and missed a late header as the Current lost 3–2 to end their season.

On April 19, 2025, Sharples scored her first goal for the Current to conclude a 2–0 win over the Houston Dash. On July 29, the Current announced that the club had re-signed her through the 2027 season with the option for an additional year. Not until after clinching the NWSL Shield did the Current see any minutes without Sharples on the field.

On November 10, 2025, it was announced that Sharples was one of five finalists for the NWSL Defender of the Year award, along with defensive teammate Izzy Rodriguez. Players from the Current made up one-third of all NWSL award nominees. Sharples was named to the 2025 NWSL Best XI First Team at the NWSL Awards.

== International career ==
In October 2025, United States head coach Emma Hayes said it was a "tough" decision not to call up Sharples for a series of friendlies, adding that the "door is open for Sharples, and I think she's been a top performer".

== Honors ==
Kansas City Current

- NWSL Championship: 2026
- NWSL Shield: 2025
- NWSL x Liga MX Femenil Summer Cup: 2024

== Career statistics ==
=== Club ===
As of April 22, 2024

Club	Season	League			Cup (Note: Includes the NWSL Challenge Cup)		Playoffs (Note: Includes NWSL Playoffs and A-League Women Finals series)		Other		Total	
Club	Season	Division	Apps	Goals	Apps	Goals	Apps	Goals	Apps	Goals	Apps	Goals
Chicago Red Stars	2019	NWSL	2	0	—		0	0	—		2	0
Chicago Red Stars	2020	NWSL	—		3	0	—		0 (Note: Includes the NWSL Fall Series)	0	3	0
Chicago Red Stars	2021	NWSL	14	0	2	0	0	0	—		16	0
Chicago Red Stars	2022	NWSL	8	0	4	0	0	0	—		12	0
Chicago Red Stars	2023	NWSL	11	1	4	0	—		—		15	1
KuPS (loan)	2020	Kansallinen Liiga	6	1	0	0	—		—		6	1
Adelaide United (loan)	2021–22	A-League	11	1	—		1	0	—		12	1
Bay FC	2024	NWSL	4	2	—		—		—		4	2
Career total			56	5	13	0	1	0	0	0	70	5
