= Sarah Luebbert =

American soccer player

Personal information
- Full name: Sarah Jacquelyn Luebbert
- Date of birth: December 16, 1997 (age 28)
- Place of birth: Jefferson City, Missouri, United States
- Height: 5 ft 7 in (1.70 m)
- Position: Winger

Team information
- Current team: América
- Number: 22

Youth career
- –2016: St. Louis Scott Gallagher

College career
Years	Team	Apps	(Gls)
2016–2019	Missouri Tigers	76	(29)

Senior career*
Years	Team	Apps	(Gls)
2020–2022	Chicago Red Stars	20	(1)
2021–2022	→ América (loan)	27	(9)
2023–	América	114	(34)
- * Club domestic league appearances and goals as of May 24, 2026

Sarah Jacquelyn Luebbert (born December 16, 1997) is an American professional soccer player who plays as a winger for Liga MX Femenil side Club América.

== College career ==
Luebbert played college soccer with the Missouri Tigers women's soccer team from 2016 to 2019, making 76 match appearances and scoring 29 goals, as well as winning multiple accolades during her three years stint with the team.

== Club career ==
Previous to her professional career, Luebbert had a short spell with WPSL team Fire & Ice Soccer Club in 2018.

=== Chicago Red Stars (2020–2021) ===
In 2019, Luebbert registered in the 2020 NWSL draft, but she was not selected by any club. Luebbert signed her first professional contract with NWSL club Chicago Red Stars in June 2020, after being invited by the club to a training camp ahead of the 2020 NWSL Challenge Cup. Luebbert made her professional debut with the Red Stars in the 2020 Challenge Cup in a match against Portland Thorns on July 1, 2020.

==== 2021–2022: Loan to Club América and Return to Chicago Red Stars ====
Chicago Red Stars announced on August 30, 2021, that Luebbert was being sent on loan for the remainder of 2021 to Liga MX Femenil side Club América so that she could get more play time. Luebbert made her debut with América on the same day that her loan was announced, in a match against Necaxa as part matchday 7 of the Apertura 2021. At the time of her arrival at América, Luebbert was just the second foreign player to play for the team.

Although Luebbert spent most of the regular phase of the Apertura 2021 tournament injured, she became an important player for the team during the liguilla, scoring goals against Chivas in the quarter-finals and against Tigres in the semi-finals.

With Luebbert's loan ending at the end of 2021, América announced on January 1, 2021 that Luebbert was staying with the team for the Clausura 2022 tournament after successfully negotiating an extension of her loan with Chicago Red Stars. During the Clausura 2022, Luebbert became a regular starter for América in the attack, scoring six goals in 16 match appearances.

Luebbert returned to Chicago Red Stars to play the 2022 NWSL season after América was knock-out in the quarter-finals of the Clausura 2022 liguilla. Luebbert made 16 match appearances and scored one goal during her return campaign with the Red Stars.

=== Club América (2023–2025) ===
On December 15, 2022, Chicago Red Stars announced that Luebbert was being permanently transferred to Club América in exchange for an agreed upon transfer fee.

== Career statistics ==
=== Club ===
As of match played July 13, 2025

Club	Season	League			Cup (Note: Includes NWSL Challenge Cup and Campeon de Campeonas)		League cup (Note: Includes Summer Cup)		Continental (Note: Includes CONCACAF W Champions Cup)		Other (Note: Includes NWSL Fall Series)		Total	
Club	Season	Division	Apps	Goals	Apps	Goals	Apps	Goals	Apps	Goals	Apps	Goals	Apps	Goals
Chicago Red Stars	2020	NWSL	0	0	1	0	—		—		4	1	5	1
Chicago Red Stars	2021	NWSL	5	0	3	0	—		—		—		8	0
Chicago Red Stars	Total		5	0	4	0	—		—		4	1	13	1
Club América (Loan)	2021–22	Liga MX Femenil	27	9	—		—		—		—		27	9
Club América (Loan)	Total		27	9	—		—		—		—		27	9
Chicago Red Stars	2022	NWSL	15	1	0	0	—		—		—		15	1
Chicago Red Stars	Total		15	1	0	0	—		—		—		15	1
Club América	2022–23	Liga MX Femenil	13	3	—		—		—		—		13	3
Club América	2023–24	Liga MX Femenil	40	16	2	0	—		—		—		42	16
Club América	2024–25	Liga MX Femenil	30	13	—		2	1	5	3	—		24	16
Club América	Total		83	32	2	0	2	1	5	3	—		92	36
Career total			130	42	6	0	2	1	5	3	4	1	134	47

== Honours ==
Club América

- Liga MX Femenil: Clausura 2023, Clausura 2026
- CONCACAF W Champions Cup: 2025–26
