= 2021 Chicago Red Stars season =

Chicago Red Stars
2021 season
- Owner: Arnim Whisler
- Head coach: Rory Dames
- Stadium: SeatGeek Stadium (capacity: 20,000)
- NWSL: 4th in season Championship finalists
- Challenge Cup: 4th in East Division
- Top goalscorer: League: Kealia Watt (5); All: Kealia Watt, Mallory Pugh (5)
- Highest home attendance: Regular season: 4,488 (Oct. 16 vs. KC); Postseason: 7,027 (Nov. 7 vs. NJNY)
- Lowest home attendance: 2,265 (June 5 vs. NC)
- Average home league attendance: 3,143
- Biggest win: 3–0 (Aug. 28 vs. KC)
- Biggest defeat: 0–5 (May 16 vs. POR)
| Home colors | Away colors | Third colors |

The 2021 Chicago Red Stars season was the team's thirteenth season and ninth season in the National Women's Soccer League, the top tier of women's soccer in the United States.

== Team ==
=== Management and staff ===
As of October 8, 2021.

Technical staff
| Head coach | Rory Dames |
| Assistant coaches | Julianne Sitch |
| Goalkeeper coach | Rade Tanaskovic |
Medical staff
| Medical director | Roger N. Chams |
| Head athletic trainer | Emily Fortunato |
| Physician assistant | Molly Uyenishi |
| Physical therapist | Bria Wanzung |

==== Rory Dames resignation ====
On November 22, 2021, two days after losing to the Washington Spirit in the NWSL championship final, the Chicago Red Stars announced that head coach Rory Dames had resigned effective immediately. Later that day, The Washington Post sports reporter Molly Hensley-Clancy reported that prior to resigning, the Post had approached the Red Stars front office with allegations from players, both previous and current, of abuse by Dames. The Post also provided documentation of reports made to United States Soccer Federation by players, including Christen Press, dating as far back as 2014 that detailed abuse, harassment, and inappropriate use of Dames's power as head coach to manipulate players. “Three former Red Stars players, including one who played on the team at the time of the investigation, told The Post that they had wanted to speak to U.S. Soccer investigators but had never heard from them,” reported Hensley-Clancy. “Two had left the team because of Dames's abuse, they said.”

On November 24, the Red Stars ownership released a statement apologizing to "Christen Press, Jennifer Hoy, Samantha Johnson and those players who didn't feel safe to come forward" and saying that "our club will require significant reflection and evaluation to ensure this does not happen again."

=== First-team squad ===
As of October 30, 2021.

| No. | Pos. | Nation | Player |
|---|---|---|---|
| 1 | GK | USA | Alyssa Naeher |
| 2 | FW | USA | Kealia Watt |
| 3 | DF | USA | Arin Wright |
| 4 | MF | USA | Alyssa Mautz |
| 5 | FW | USA | Rachel Hill |
| 6 | DF | USA | Casey Krueger |
| 7 | MF | USA | Nikki Stanton |
| 8 | MF | USA | Julie Ertz |
| 9 | FW | USA | Mallory Pugh |
| 10 | MF | USA | Vanessa DiBernardo |
| 11 | DF | USA | Sarah Gorden |
| 13 | MF | USA | Morgan Gautrat |
| 14 | DF | USA | Zoe Morse |
| 15 | FW | USA | Makenzy Doniak |
| 16 | MF | USA | Sarah Woldmoe |
| 18 | MF | USA | Ella Stevens |
| 21 | GK | USA | Emily Boyd |
| 22 | DF | CAN | Bianca St. Georges |
| 23 | DF | USA | Tatumn Milazzo |
| 24 | MF | USA | Danielle Colaprico |
| 26 | DF | USA | Tierna Davidson |
| 28 | DF | USA | Kayla Sharples |
| 32 | FW | USA | Zoey Goralski |
| 33 | FW | MEX | Katie Johnson |
| 38 | GK | USA | Cassie Miller |

==== Out on loan ====
| No. | Pos. | Nation | Player |
|---|---|---|---|
| 19 | MF | USA | Sarah Luebbert (at América) |

== Competitions ==
=== Challenge Cup ===
==== Group stage ====
| April 9, 2021 1 | Houston Dash | 0–0 | Chicago Red Stars | Houston, Texas |
| | | Report | Wright (yellow card) 26' | Stadium: PNC Stadium; Attendance: 4,204 |

| April 15, 2021 2 | Chicago Red Stars | 0–1 | Portland Thorns FC | Bridgeview, Illinois |
| | Stevens (yellow card) 85' | Report | Westphal (yellow card) 45'; Weaver 66' (Boureille) | Stadium: SeatGeek Stadium |

| April 21, 2021 3 | Chicago Red Stars | 1–1 | Kansas City NWSL | Bridgeview, Illinois |
| | Colaprico (yellow card) 25'; Ertz (yellow card) 66'; Katie Johnson 82' (Wright) | Report | Rodriguez 80' (Smith) | Stadium: SeatGeek Stadium |

| April 27, 2021 4 | OL Reign | 3–2 | Chicago Red Stars | Tacoma, Washington |
| | Huerta 41' (Fishlock); Pruitt 70' (King); King 87' (Cruz) | Report | Pugh 38' (Krueger); Gautrat | Stadium: Cheney Stadium; Attendance: 1,105 |

==== West Division standings ====
| Pos | Team | Pld | W | D | L | GF | GA | GD | Pts | Qualification |
|---|---|---|---|---|---|---|---|---|---|---|
| 1 | Portland Thorns FC | 4 | 3 | 1 | 0 | 6 | 2 | +4 | 10 | Qualification for the Championship |
| 2 | OL Reign | 4 | 2 | 1 | 1 | 5 | 5 | 0 | 7 | |
| 3 | Houston Dash | 4 | 1 | 3 | 0 | 4 | 2 | +2 | 6 | |
| 4 | Chicago Red Stars | 4 | 0 | 2 | 2 | 3 | 5 | −2 | 2 | |
| 5 | Kansas City | 4 | 0 | 1 | 3 | 4 | 8 | −4 | 1 | |

Source: NWSL
Rules for classification: Tiebreakers

=== Regular season ===
==== Matches ====
| May 16, 2021 1 | Portland Thorns FC | 5–0 | Chicago Red Stars | Portland, Oregon |
| | Davidson 4' (o.g.); Sinclair 13' (pen.); Smith 16' (Weaver), 30' (Weaver); Horan (yellow card) 64'; Lussi 72' | Report | | Stadium: Providence Park |

| May 22, 2021 2 | Chicago Red Stars | 0–0 | Kansas City NWSL | Bridgeview, Illinois |
| | Sharples (yellow card) 70'; Colaprico (yellow card) 86' | Report | Viens (yellow card) 43'; Purce (yellow card) 74' | Stadium: SeatGeek Stadium; Attendance: 3,121 |

| May 26, 2021 3 | Kansas City NWSL | 0–2 | Chicago Red Stars | Kansas City, Kansas |
| | Weber (yellow card) 82' | Report | Johnson (yellow card) 42'; Gautrat (yellow card) 66'; Watt 67' (Pugh); Doniak 70' (Pugh); Naeher (yellow card) 89' | Stadium: Legends Field; Attendance: 5,272 |

| May 29, 2021 4 | Houston Dash | 2–1 | Chicago Red Stars | Houston, Texas |
| | Prince 18' (Montefusco), (yellow card) 69'; Mewis 83' (Schmidt) | Report | Pugh 4'; Gautrat (yellow card) 59' | Stadium: PNC Stadium |

| June 5, 2021 5 | Chicago Red Stars | 1–0 | North Carolina Courage | Bridgeview, Illinois |
| | Hill 29'; Woldmoe (yellow card) 88' | Report | | Stadium: SeatGeek Stadium |

| June 19, 2021 6 | Chicago Red Stars | 1–1 | Washington Spirit | Bridgeview, Illinois |
| | Gautrat 90+2' (pen.) | Report | Rodman 85' (Sullivan) | Stadium: SeatGeek Stadium; Attendance: 3,296 |

| June 22, 2021 7 | OL Reign | 2–0 | Chicago Red Stars | Tacoma, Washington |
| | Cruz 1'; Balcer 18' (Huerta), (yellow card) 25'; Marozsán (yellow card) 79'; McNabb (yellow card) 90+4' | Report | Gorden (yellow card) 40'; St-Georges (yellow card) 46' (yellow-red card) 90+2' | Stadium: Cheney Stadium; Attendance: 2,518 |

| June 26, 2021 8 | Chicago Red Stars | 0–3 | Racing Louisville FC | Bridgeview, Illinois |
| | Colaprico (yellow card) 11' (yellow-red card) 55' | Report | Nagasato (yellow card) 29', (goal) 56'; Salmon 38' (Kizer); McCaskill 62' | Stadium: SeatGeek Stadium; Attendance: 2,636 |

| July 2, 2021 9 | Washington Spirit | 0–1 | Chicago Red Stars | Leesburg, Virginia |
| | | Report | Roddar 33' (o.g.) | Stadium: Segra Field; Attendance: 3,201 |

| July 11, 2021 10 | Chicago Red Stars | 2–1 | Houston Dash | Bridgeview, Illinois |
| | Groom 73' (o.g.); Naughton 76' (o.g.) | Report | Latsko 62'; Hanson (yellow card) 88' | Stadium: SeatGeek Stadium |

| July 18, 2021 11 | Chicago Red Stars | 3–1 | OL Reign | Bridgeview, Illinois |
| | Celia 48' (o.g.); Cook 55' (o.g.); Pugh 64' (Watt) | Report | Balcer 12' (Celia); Celia (yellow card) 47'; King (yellow card) 73' | Stadium: SeatGeek Stadium; Attendance: 3,301 |

| July 25, 2021 12 | NJ/NY Gotham FC | 2–1 | Chicago Red Stars | Harrison, New Jersey |
| | Dorsey (yellow card) 10'; Long 45+3' (Dydasco); Onumonu (yellow card) 67'; Purce 70' (pen.) | Report | Watt (yellow card) 45+4'; St-Georges (yellow card) 90+4' (red card); Doniak 90+6' (Johnson) | Stadium: Red Bull Arena |

| August 1, 2021 13 | Chicago Red Stars | 3–1 | Washington Spirit | Bridgeview, Illinois |
| | Pugh 19'; Hill 39'; Gautrat 80' (pen.) | Report | Rodman (yellow card) 30', (goal) 71'; Aylmer (yellow card) 68'; Staab (yellow card) 79' | Stadium: SeatGeek Stadium; Attendance: 2,534 |

| August 8, 2021 14 | Chicago Red Stars | 0–2 | Orlando Pride | Bridgeview, Illinois |
| | Bench assistant (yellow card) 70' (red card); 2nd assistant (yellow card) 70' | Report | Taylor 15' (Krieger), (yellow card) 43'; Turner (yellow card) 45+2'; Kornieck (yellow card) 69'; Leroux 89' (Tymrak) | Stadium: SeatGeek Stadium; Attendance: 3,298 |

| August 15, 2021 15 | North Carolina Courage | 1–0 | Chicago Red Stars | Cary, North Carolina |
| | Rodriguez 39' (pen.) | Report | Watt (yellow card) 87' | Stadium: WakeMed Soccer Park; Attendance: 5,002 |

| August 18, 2021 16 | Racing Louisville FC | 1–1 | Chicago Red Stars | Louisville, Kentucky |
| | Salmon 10', (yellow card) 57'; Riehl (yellow card) 65'; Nagasato (yellow card) 90' | Report | Watt 57' | Stadium: Lynn Family Stadium; Attendance: 7,310 |

| August 28, 2021 17 | Chicago Red Stars | 3–0 | Kansas City NWSL | Bridgeview, Illinois |
| | Woldmoe 36' (Pugh), 62', (yellow card) 89'; Johnson 81' (Watt) | Report | | Stadium: SeatGeek Stadium; Attendance: 3,536 |

| September 4, 2021 18 | NJ/NY Gotham FC | 0–0 | Chicago Red Stars | Bridgeview, Illinois |
| | Lloyd (yellow card) 27'; Dorsey (yellow card) 66' | Report | Gautrat (yellow card) 29'; Wright (yellow card) 86' | Stadium: SeatGeek Stadium; Attendance: 3,252 |

| September 10, 2021 19 | Houston Dash | 1–1 | Chicago Red Stars | Houston, Texas |
| | Daly 22'; Chapman (yellow card) 76' | Report | Krueger (yellow card) 64', (goal) 77' | Stadium: PNC Stadium; Attendance: 3,155 |

| September 25, 2021 20 | Chicago Red Stars | 2–1 | Portland Thorns FC | Bridgeview, Illinois |
| | Watt 25' (Wright); Hill 65' (Pugh) | Report | Sinclair 24' (Dunn); Sauerbrunn (yellow card) 90+2' | Stadium: SeatGeek Stadium; Attendance: 3,527 |

| October 10, 2021 21 | OL Reign | 3–2 | Chicago Red Stars | Tacoma, Washington |
| | Fishlock 31' (Huerta), 35'; Lavelle 51' (Huerta) | Report | Pugh 14' (Watt); Wright (yellow card) 25'; Milazzo 69' | Stadium: Cheney Stadium; Attendance: 3,588 |

| October 13, 2021 22 | Chicago Red Stars | 1–0 | Orlando Pride | Bridgeview, Illinois |
| | Watt 6', (yellow card) 43'; Boyd (yellow card) 45'; Pugh (yellow card) 90+1' | Report | | Stadium: SeatGeek Stadium; Attendance: 3,198 |

| October 16, 2021 23 | Chicago Red Stars | 2–1 | Kansas City NWSL | Bridgeview, Illinois |
| 19:00 CDT | Edmonds 34' (o.g.); Doniak 50' (Watt) | Report | Mace 37' (Bowen); Ball (yellow card) 88' | Stadium: SeatGeek Stadium; Attendance: 4,488 |

| October 29, 2021 24 | Orlando Pride | 0–1 | Chicago Red Stars | Orlando, Florida |
| | Strom (yellow card) 30' | Report | Watt (yellow card) 55', (goal) 65' (Gautrat) | Stadium: Exploria Stadium |

==== Regular season standings ====
| Pos | Team | Pld | W | D | L | GF | GA | GD | Pts | Qualification |
|---|---|---|---|---|---|---|---|---|---|---|
| 1 | Portland Thorns FC | 24 | 13 | 5 | 6 | 33 | 17 | +16 | 44 | NWSL Shield |
| 2 | OL Reign | 24 | 13 | 3 | 8 | 37 | 24 | +13 | 42 | Playoffs – Semi-finals |
| 3 | Washington Spirit (C) | 24 | 11 | 6 | 7 | 29 | 26 | +3 | 39 | Playoffs – First round |
| 4 | Chicago Red Stars | 24 | 11 | 5 | 8 | 28 | 28 | 0 | 38 | Playoffs – First round |
| 5 | NJ/NY Gotham FC | 24 | 8 | 11 | 5 | 29 | 21 | +8 | 35 | Playoffs – First round |
| 6 | North Carolina Courage | 24 | 9 | 6 | 9 | 28 | 23 | +5 | 33 | Playoffs – First round |
| 7 | Houston Dash | 24 | 9 | 5 | 10 | 31 | 31 | 0 | 32 | |
| 8 | Orlando Pride | 24 | 7 | 7 | 10 | 27 | 32 | −5 | 28 | |
| 9 | Racing Louisville FC | 24 | 5 | 7 | 12 | 21 | 40 | −19 | 22 | |
| 10 | Kansas City | 24 | 3 | 7 | 14 | 15 | 36 | −21 | 16 | |

Source: NWSL
Rules for classification: Tiebreakers
(C) Champions

==== Results summary ====
| Overall | | | | | | | | Home | | | | | | Away | | | | | |
| Pld | W | D | L | GF | GA | GD | Pts | W | D | L | GF | GA | GD | W | D | L | GF | GA | GD |
|---|---|---|---|---|---|---|---|---|---|---|---|---|---|---|---|---|---|---|---|
| 24 | 11 | 5 | 8 | 28 | 28 | 0 | 38 | 8 | 2 | 2 | 19 | 11 | +8 | 3 | 3 | 6 | 9 | 17 | −8 |

Last updated: October 30, 2021.
Source: NWSLsoccer.com

==== Results by matchday ====
| Matchday | 1 | 2 | 3 | 4 | 5 | 6 | 7 | 8 | 9 | 10 | 11 | 12 | 13 | 14 | 15 | 16 | 17 | 18 | 19 | 20 | 21 | 22 | 23 | 24 |
|---|---|---|---|---|---|---|---|---|---|---|---|---|---|---|---|---|---|---|---|---|---|---|---|---|
| Stadium | A | H | A | A | H | H | A | H | A | H | H | A | H | H | A | A | H | A | A | H | A | H | H | A |
| Result | L | D | W | L | W | D | L | L | W | W | W | L | W | L | L | D | W | D | D | W | L | W | W | W |
| Position | 10 | 9 | 4 | 8 | 4 | 4 | 5 | 8 | 7 | 5 | 2 | 4 | 3 | 5 | 5 | 5 | 3 | 4 | 4 | 4 | 7 | 5 | 4 | 3 |

Updated to match(es) played on October 30, 2021. Source: NWSL
A = Away; H = Home; W = Win; D = Draw; L = Loss

==== Playoffs ====
===== Matches =====
| November 7, 2021 First round | Chicago Red Stars | 1–0 | NJ/NY Gotham FC | Bridgeview, Illinois |
| 14:00 CST | Woldmoe (yellow card) 51'; Pugh 61' (Woldmoe); DiBernardo (yellow card) 80' | Report | Freeman (yellow card) 67'; Lloyd (yellow card) 72'; Johnson (yellow card) 90' | Stadium: SeatGeek Stadium; Attendance: 7,027; Referee: Kevin Broadley |

| November 14, 2021 Semifinal | Portland Thorns FC | 0–2 | Chicago Red Stars | Portland, Oregon |
| 14:30 PST | Salem (yellow card) 80' | Report | Johnson 37' (DiBernardo); Woldmoe 59' (Gautrat) | Stadium: Providence Park; Attendance: 15,832; Referee: Katja Koroleva |

| November 7, 2021 Final | Washington Spirit | 2–1 (a.e.t.) | Chicago Red Stars | Louisville, Kentucky |
| 12:00 EST | Sullivan 67' (pen.); O'Hara 97' (Rodman); Roddar (yellow card) 101' | Report | Hill 45+5' (Wright) | Stadium: Lynn Family Stadium; Attendance: 10,360; Referee: Tori Penso |

== Transactions ==
=== 2021 NWSL Draft ===
Draft picks are not automatically signed to the team roster. The 2021 NWSL Draft was held on January 13, 2021.

| Round | Pick | Nat. | Player | Pos. | College | Status | Ref. |
|---|---|---|---|---|---|---|---|
| 1 | 7 | (United States) | Madison Haley | FW | Stanford | Returned to Stanford; did not make final 2022 roster | |
| 2 | 18 | (United States) | Kelsey Turnbow | FW | Santa Clara | Returned to Santa Clara; traded to San Diego Wave FC in December 2021 | |
| 3 | 25 | (United States) | Brianna Alger | DF | Washington State | Returned to Washington State; did not make final 2022 roster | |
| 4 | 32 | (United States) | Channing Foster | FW | Ole Miss | Returned to Ole Miss; signed contract in 2022 | |
| 4 | 35 | (United States) | Alissa Gorzak | FW | Virginia | Not offered a contract | |

=== Transfers out ===
| Date | Nat. | Player | Pos. | Destination club | Fee/notes | Ref. |
|---|---|---|---|---|---|---|
| March 29, 2021 | (Mexico) | María Sánchez | FW | (United States) Houston Dash | Rights traded in exchange for Houston's natural second-round pick in the 2022 NWSL Draft. | |
| November 30, 2021 | (United States) | Kayla Sharples | DF | (Australia) Adelaide United FC | Loaned until March 28, 2022. | |
| December 2, 2021 | (United States) | Makenzy Doniak | FW | (United States) San Diego Wave FC | Traded in exchange for protection in the 2022 NWSL Expansion Draft and an undisclosed amount of allocation money. | |
| December 2, 2021 | (United States) | Katie Johnson | FW | (United States) San Diego Wave FC | Traded in exchange for protection in the 2022 NWSL Expansion Draft and an undisclosed amount of allocation money. | |
| December 2, 2021 | (United States) | Kelsey Turnbow | FW | (United States) San Diego Wave FC | Traded in exchange for protection in the 2022 NWSL Expansion Draft and an undisclosed amount of allocation money. | |
| December 2, 2021 | (United States) | Julie Ertz | MF | (United States) Angel City FC | Traded with international slots in 2022 and 2023 in exchange for protection in the 2022 NWSL Expansion Draft. | |
| December 2, 2021 | (United States) | Sarah Gorden | DF | (United States) Angel City FC | Traded with international slots in 2022 and 2023 in exchange for protection in the 2022 NWSL Expansion Draft. | |
| December 2, 2021 | (United States) | Nikki Stanton | MF | (United States) OL Reign | Traded for a third-round pick in the 2022 NWSL Draft. | |
| December 8, 2021 | (United States) | Zoey Goralski | DF | — | Retired. | |
