= 2022 Chicago Red Stars season =

Chicago Red Stars
2022 season
- Owner: Arnim Whisler
- Head coach: Chris Petrucelli
- Stadium: SeatGeek Stadium; Bridgeview, Illinois (Capacity: 20,000)
- NWSL: 6th
- Challenge Cup: 2nd in Central Division
- Playoffs: First Round
- Top goalscorer: League: Mallory Pugh (11); All: Mallory Pugh (15)
- Highest home attendance: 23,951 (vs San Diego Wave FC, July 30)
- Lowest home attendance: 2,135 (vs Kansas City Current, Sept. 14)
- Average home league attendance: 5,872
- Biggest win: 4–0 (two matches)
- Biggest defeat: 3 goals (three matches)
Home colors	Away colors	Third colors
- All statistics correct as of October 16, 2022.

The 2022 Chicago Red Stars season was the team's fourteenth season as a professional women's soccer team, and ninth in the National Women's Soccer League, the top tier of women's soccer in the United States.

== Team ==
=== Management and staff ===
As of October 8, 2021.

Technical staff
Head coach	Chris Petrucelli
Assistant coaches	Morinao Imaizumi; Fabrice Gautrat
Goalkeeper coach	Rade Tanaskovic
Medical staff
Medical director	Roger N. Chams
Head athletic trainer	Emily Fortunato
Physician assistant	Molly Uyenishi
Physical therapist	Bria Wanzung
High performance director	Jake Roy

== Competitions ==
Win Tie Loss

All times are in CT unless otherwise noted.

=== Regular season ===
April 30 1	Chicago Red Stars	2–1	Racing Louisville FC	Bridgeview, Illinois
19:00 CDT	Stevens 2' (yellow card) 68'; St-Georges 25'; Colaprico (yellow card) 47'	Report	Fox 10'; Bonner (yellow card) 75'	Stadium: SeatGeek Stadium; Attendance: 3,028

May 15 2	San Diego Wave FC	2–1	Chicago Red Stars	San Diego, California
14:00 PDT	Morgan 56' (pen.); Taylor (yellow card) 61'; Riehl 89'; Sheridan (yellow card) 90'	Report	Sharples (yellow card) 55'; Cook 90'	Stadium: Torero Stadium; Attendance: 5,000

May 22 3	Orlando Pride	2–4	Chicago Red Stars	Orlando, Florida
19:00 EDT	Turner 83' (yellow card) 70'; Listro (yellow card) 76'; Pruitt 87'	Report	Griffith 11'; St-Georges 54'; Pugh 64', 86'; Morse (yellow card) 84'; Milazzo (yellow card) 90'; Kowalski (yellow card) 90+3'	Stadium: Exploria Stadium; Attendance: 3,015; Referee: Danielle Chesky

May 28 4	Chicago Red Stars	2–2	Portland Thorns FC	Bridgeview, Illinois
19:00 CDT	Pugh 5'; Hill 20'	Report	Sugita 7'; Smith 47'; Beckie (yellow card) 59'; Coffey (yellow card) 84'	Stadium: SeatGeek Stadium; Attendance: 3,268

June 1 5	Washington Spirit	1–1	Chicago Red Stars	Leesburg, Virginia
19:30 EDT	Roddar (yellow card) 29'; Staab 86'	Report	Stevens 10'; Milazzo (yellow card) 45+2'	Stadium: Segra Field; Attendance: 1,961

June 4 6	Chicago Red Stars	1–0	OL Reign	Bridgeview, Illinois
14:00 CDT	Aguilera (yellow card) 18'; Pugh 47'; Hill (yellow card) 90+2'	Report		Stadium: SeatGeek Stadium; Attendance: 3,002

June 8 7	Chicago Red Stars	0–0	Washington Spirit	Bridgeview, Illinois
19:00 CDT	Cook (yellow card) 66'	Report	Sonnett (yellow card) 24'; Aylmer (yellow card) 45'; Rodman (yellow card) 76'	Stadium: SeatGeek Stadium; Attendance: 2,312

June 12 8	Chicago Red Stars	1–0	Orlando Pride	Bridgeview, Illinois
17:00 CDT	Pugh 10' (St. Georges); Nagasato (yellow card) 49'; Colaprico (yellow card) 61'	Report	Pressley (yellow card) 56'	Stadium: SeatGeek Stadium; Attendance: 3,881; Referee: Alyssa Nichols

June 18 9	Kansas City Current	2–2	Chicago Red Stars	Kansas City, Kansas
19:30 CDT	Hamilton 8' (Mace); Kizer 68' (Bennett)	Report	DiBernardo (yellow card) 3'; Kowalski 53' (Pugh); Pugh 58' (pen.); Colaprico (yellow card) 88'	Stadium: Children's Mercy Park; Attendance: 6,848; Referee: John Griggs

July 2 10	NJ/NY Gotham FC	0–3	Chicago Red Stars	Harrison, New Jersey
19:00 EDT	Dydasco (yellow card) 39'; Zerboni (yellow card) 64'	Report	Luebbert 15' (Stevens); DiBernardo 25' (Milazzo); Stevens 84' (Nagasato)	Stadium: Red Bull Arena; Attendance: 3,499; Referee: Matthew Corrigan

July 10 11	Chicago Red Stars	2–2	North Carolina Courage	Bridgeview, Illinois
17:00 CDT	Griffith 90+1' (DiBernardo); Kowalski 90+5' (Colaprico)	Report	Pickett 22' (Speck); Ratcliffe 49' (Mathias), (yellow card) 70'; Daniels (yellow card) 65'; Baucom (yellow card) 79'	Stadium: SeatGeek Stadium; Attendance: 4,098; Referee: Alyssa Nichols

July 16 12	Houston Dash	4–1	Chicago Red Stars	Houston, Texas
19:30 CDT	Salmon 11' (Groom), 45+1' (Jacobs), 55' (Gareis); Anderson 90+3' (Farquharson)	Report	Fisher 88'	Stadium: PNC Stadium; Attendance: 4,637

July 30 13	Chicago Red Stars	0–1	San Diego Wave FC	Chicago, Illinois
19:00 CDT		Report	Dahlkemper (yellow card) 13' (yellow-red card) 59'; Girma (yellow card) 22'; Shaw 27' (K. Johnson); Briede (yellow card) 84'	Stadium: Soldier Field; Attendance: 23,951; Referee: Danielle Chesky

August 7 14	Chicago Red Stars	2–0	NJ/NY Gotham FC	Bridgeview, Illinois
17:00 CDT	Milazzo 45+5' (Colaprico); Cook 66' (Pugh)	Report	Mewis (yellow card) 34'; Baxter (yellow card) 89'; Tucker (yellow card) 90+3'	Stadium: SeatGeek Stadium; Attendance: 5,078; Referee: Kevin Broadley

August 14 15	Angel City FC	1–0	Chicago Red Stars	Los Angeles
17:00 PDT	McCaskill 48'; Lussi (yellow card) 54'	Report		Stadium: Banc of California Stadium; Attendance: 17,002; Referee: Mark Allatin

August 20 16	North Carolina Courage	4–0	Chicago Red Stars	Cary, North Carolina
19:00 EDT	Ordoñez 10' (Pickett), 74' (Nagano); Nagano 64'; Mathias (yellow card) 72'; Baisden 88' (Kerolin)	Report	Stevens (yellow card) 81'	Stadium: Sahlen's Stadium; Attendance: 3,571

August 27 17	Racing Louisville FC	0–4	Chicago Red Stars	Louisville, Kentucky
19:30 EDT	Bonner (yellow card) 22'; Nadim (yellow card) 90+4'	Report	Pugh 3' (St-Georges), 73' (Nagasato); Nagasato 18' (Pugh), 23' (Pugh)	Stadium: Lynn Family Stadium; Attendance: 8,729; Referee: Alex Billeter

September 9 18	OL Reign	2–2	Chicago Red Stars	Seattle
19:00 PDT	Huitema 18'; Lavelle 80' (Rapinoe)	Report	Stevens 45+2'; Colaprico 68' (pen.)	Stadium: Lumen Field; Attendance: 7,427

September 14 19	Chicago Red Stars	4–0	Kansas City Current	Bridgeview, Illinois
19:00 CDT	Milazzo 5'; Pugh 8' (Morse), 60', (yellow card) 26'; DiBernardo (yellow card) 47'; Kowalski 72' (Pugh), (yellow card) 75'	Report	Leach (yellow card) 42'; Ball (yellow card) 90'	Stadium: SeatGeek Stadium; Attendance: 2,135; Referee: Katja Koroleva

September 17 20	Chicago Red Stars	0–1	Houston Dash	Bridgeview, Illinois
19:00 CDT	St-Georges (yellow card) 56'	Report	Salmon 25' (Prince); Prince (yellow card) 38'	Stadium: SeatGeek Stadium; Attendance: 5,488

September 25 21	Portland Thorns FC	3–0	Chicago Red Stars	Portland, Oregon
13:00 PDT	Kuikka (yellow card) 31'; Rodríguez (yellow card) 44'; Weaver 48' (Coffey), 61' (Smith); Porter 90+3'	Report	St-Georges (red card) 58'; Morse (yellow card) 63' (yellow-red card) 90+1'	Stadium: Providence Park; Attendance: 19,127; Referee: Alexandra Billeter

October 2 22	Chicago Red Stars	2–0	Angel City FC	Bridgeview, Illinois
17:00 CDT	Pugh 45+4' (Luebbert); Colaprico (yellow card) 64'; Nagasato 77'	Report	Reid (yellow card) 68'; Le Bihan (yellow card) 74'	Stadium: SeatGeek Stadium; Attendance: 8,347; Referee: Kevin Broadley

==== Regular-season standings ====
Pos	Team	Pld	W	D	L	GF	GA	GD	Pts	Qualification
4	Houston Dash	22	10	6	6	35	27	+8	36	Playoffs – first round
5	Kansas City Current	22	10	6	6	29	29	0	36	Playoffs – first round
6	Chicago Red Stars	22	9	6	7	34	28	+6	33	Playoffs – first round
7	North Carolina Courage	22	9	5	8	46	33	+13	32	
8	Angel City FC	22	8	5	9	23	27	−4	29	

Source: NWSL
Rules for classification: Tiebreakers

===== Results summary =====
Overall								Home						Away					
Pld	W	D	L	GF	GA	GD	Pts	W	D	L	GF	GA	GD	W	D	L	GF	GA	GD
22	9	6	7	34	28	+6	33	6	3	2	16	7	+9	3	3	5	18	21	−3

Last updated: October 2, 2022.
Source: NWSLsoccer.com

===== Results by matchday =====
Matchday	1	2	3	4	5	6	7	8	9	10	11	12	13	14	15	16	17	18	19	20	21	22
Stadium	H	A	A	H	A	H	H	H	A	A	H	A	H	H	A	A	A	A	H	H	A	H
Result	W	L	W	D	D	W	D	W	D	W	D	L	L	W	L	L	W	D	W	L	L	W
Position	3	6	6	6	5	3	3	2	3	2	2	3	4	4	6	6	6	6	5	6	7	6

Updated to match(es) played on October 2, 2022. Source: NWSL
A = Away; H = Home; W = Win; D = Draw; L = Loss

=== Playoffs ===
The top six teams from the regular season qualified for the NWSL Championship playoffs, with the top two teams receiving a first-round bye. Chicago finished the season in sixth place, earning the lowest seed in the playoff tournament's first-round and facing third-seeded San Diego Wave FC on the road.

October 16 1	San Diego Wave FC	2–1 (a.e.t.)	Chicago Red Stars	San Diego, California
22:30 EDT	van Egmond 67'; Morgan 110'	Report	Nagasato 10'	Stadium: Snapdragon Stadium; Attendance: 26,215; Referee: Mark Allatin

=== Challenge Cup ===
==== Group stage ====
March 20	Houston Dash	1–3	Chicago Red Stars	Houston, Texas
18:00	Naughton 19'; Visalli (yellow card) 65'; Schmidt (yellow card) 88'	Report	St-Georges (yellow card) 18'; Pugh 27', 60'; Morse (yellow card) 45+2'; Wright 58' (pen.)	Stadium: PNC Stadium; Attendance: 4,087; Referee: Joshua Encarnación

March 25	Chicago Red Stars	1–2	Kansas City Current	Bridgeview, Illinois
19:30	DiBernardo 22'; Wright (yellow card) 54'; Cook (yellow card) 90+2'	Report	Mace 58'; Winebrenner (yellow card) 68'; Bennett (yellow card) 77'; Hamilton 86'	Stadium: SeatGeek Stadium; Attendance: 2,604; Referee: Greg Dopka

March 30	Chicago Red Stars	0–0	Racing Louisville FC	Bridgeview, Illinois
18:30	Nagasato (yellow card) 21'	Report		Stadium: SeatGeek Stadium; Referee: Calin Radosav

April 2	Chicago Red Stars	2–0	Houston Dash	Bridgeview, Illinois
19:00	St-Georges (yellow card) 6'; Pugh 32', 82'	Report		Stadium: SeatGeek Stadium; Attendance: 1,741; Referee: Katja Koroleva

April 16	Racing Louisville FC	1–1	Chicago Red Stars	Louisville, Kentucky
19:30 EDT	Olofsson (yellow card) 28'; Ekic 76'	Report	Kowalski 7'; Colaprico (yellow card) 51'; DiBernardo (yellow card) 75'; Cook (yellow card) 84'	Stadium: Lynn Family Stadium; Attendance: 4,409; Referee: Laura Rodriguez

April 24	Kansas City Current	2–1	Chicago Red Stars	Kansas City, Kansas
16:00	Loera 50'; Edmonds (yellow card) 74'; Hamilton 76'	Report	Wright (yellow card) 45+2'; St-Georges 52'	Stadium: Children's Mercy Park; Attendance: 5,107; Referee: Adorae Monroy

===== Central Division standings =====
Pos	Team	Pld	W	T	L	GF	GA	GD	Pts	Qualification	KC	CHI	LOU	HOU
1	Kansas City Current	6	4	1	1	10	7	+3	13	Advance to knockout stage	—	2–1	0–3	2–1
2	Chicago Red Stars	6	2	2	2	8	6	+2	8		1–2	—	0–0	2–0
3	Racing Louisville FC	6	1	3	2	8	7	+1	6		1–1	1–1	—	2–3
4	Houston Dash	6	2	0	4	7	13	−6	6		0–3	1–3	2–1	—

Source: NWSL
Rules for classification: 1) Total points; 2) Total goal differential; 3) Total number of goals scored; 4) Head-to-head points record; 5) Head-to-head goal differential; 6) Head-to-head number of goals scored; 7) Fewest disciplinary points; 8) Drawing of lots

== Players ==
As of October 16, 2022.

Chicago used a total of 25 players during the 2022 season, with 14 scoring goals. There were also three squad members who did not make a first-team appearance in the campaign.

The Red Stars scored 43 goals in all competitions. Mallory Pugh, with 15 goals, was the highest scorer, followed by Amanda Kowalski, Yūki Nagasato, and Ella Stevens, who scored four goals each.

Key

No. = Squad number

Pos. = Playing position

Nat. = Nationality

Apps = Appearances

G = Goals

GK = Goalkeeper

DF = Defender

MF = Midfielder

FW = Forward

= Yellow cards

= Red cards

Numbers under Apps indicate starts, and numbers in parentheses denote appearances as a substitute. Players whose names are struck through and marked † left the club during the playing season.

Player statistics
No.	Pos.	Nat.	Name	Cup		NWSL		Playoffs		Total		Discipline	
No.	Pos.	Nat.	Name	Apps	G	Apps	G	Apps	G	Apps	G	A yellow rectangular card	A red rectangular card
1	GK	(United States)	Alyssa Naeher	6	0	19	0	1	0	26	0	0	0
3	DF	(United States)	Arin Wright	5 (1)	1	7 (3)	0	1	0	13 (4)	1	2	0
4	MF	(United States)	~~Alyssa Mautz~~ †	1 (5)	0	1 (7)	0	0	0	2 (12)	0	0	0
5	MF	(United States)	Rachel Hill	0	0	15 (5)	1	1	0	16 (5)	1	0	0
7	MF	(Japan)	Yūki Nagasato	5 (1)	0	20 (1)	3	1	1	26 (2)	4	2	0
8	FW	(United States)	Ella Stevens	3 (2)	0	10 (9)	4	0 (1)	0	13 (12)	4	2	0
9	FW	(United States)	Mallory Pugh	5	4	13 (3)	11	1	0	19 (3)	15	1	0
10	MF	(United States)	Vanessa DiBernardo	6	1	22	1	1	0	29	2	3	0
11	MF	(United States)	Sarah Luebbert	0	0	9 (5)	1	1	0	10 (5)	1	0	0
12	DF	(United States)	Tierna Davidson	1	0	0	0	0	0	1	0	0	0
13	MF	(United States)	Morgan Gautrat	1 (1)	0	2 (3)	0	1	0	4 (4)	0	0	0
14	DF	(Puerto Rico)	Jill Aguilera	0 (3)	0	5 (12)	0	0 (1)	0	5 (16)	0	1	0
15	FW	(United States)	Sarah Griffith	2 (4)	0	6 (13)	2	0 (1)	0	8 (18)	2	0	0
18	FW	(United States)	Samantha Fisher	0	0	5 (8)	1	0	0	5 (8)	1	0	0
19	FW	(United States)	Channing Foster	0 (1)	0	0 (1)	0	0	0	0 (2)	0	0	0
20	DF	(United States)	Zoe Morse	6	0	21	0	1	0	28	0	4	1
21	GK	(Australia)	Emily Boyd	0	0	3	0	0	0	3	0	0	0
22	DF	(Canada)	Bianca St-Georges	4 (1)	1	13 (2)	2	0	0	17 (3)	3	3	1
23	DF	(United States)	Tatumn Milazzo	6	0	22	2	1	0	29	2	2	0
24	MF	(United States)	Danielle Colaprico	5 (1)	0	19 (3)	1	1	0	25 (4)	1	5	0
25	FW	(United States)	Ava Cook	2 (3)	0	9 (9)	2	0 (1)	0	11 (13)	2	3	0
26	DF	(United States)	Mikenna McManus	1	0	0 (1)	0	0	0	1 (1)	0	0	0
27	FW	(Australia)	Chelsie Dawber	0	0	1 (3)	0	0	0	1 (3)	0	0	0
28	DF	(United States)	Kayla Sharples	4	0	8	0	0	0	12	0	1	0
31	DF	(United States)	Amanda Kowalski	3	1	12 (5)	3	0	0	15 (5)	4	2	0

Source: NWSL, FBref
