= Makenzy Robbe =

American soccer player (born 1994)

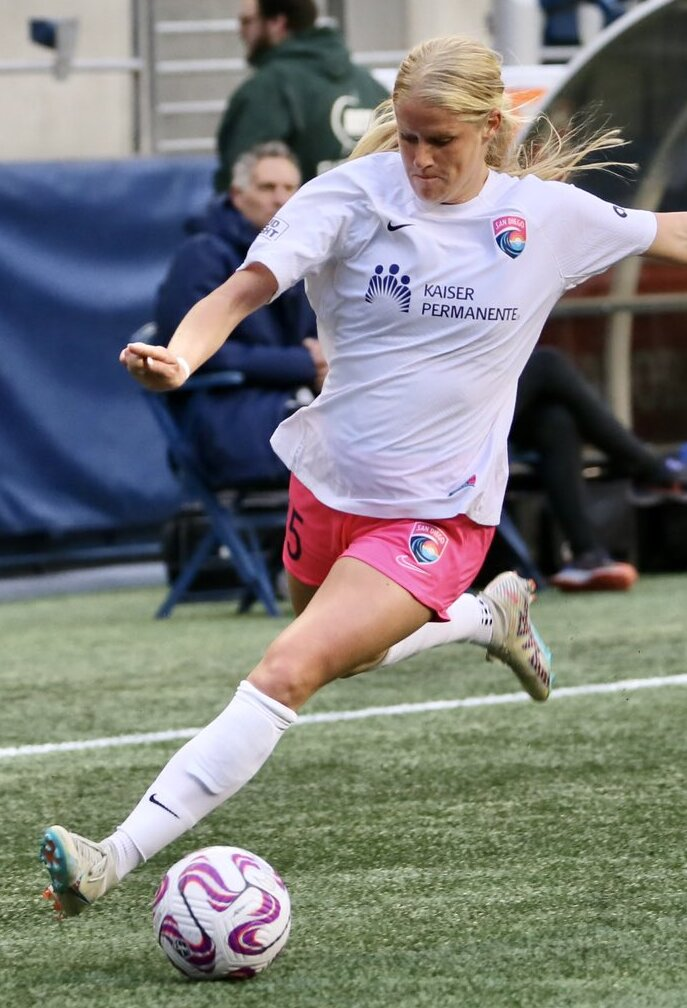
- Robbe with the San Diego Wave in 2023

Personal information
- Birth name: Makenzy Allyson Doniak
- Date of birth: February 25, 1994 (age 32)
- Place of birth: Chino Hills, California, U.S.
- Height: 5 ft 8 in (1.73 m)
- Positions: Forward; midfielder

Team information
- Current team: Houston Dash
- Number: 25

Youth career
- Slammers FC

College career
Years	Team	Apps	(Gls)
2012–2015	Virginia Cavaliers	96	(64)

Senior career*
Years	Team	Apps	(Gls)
2016	Western New York Flash	20	(3)
2017–2018	North Carolina Courage	22	(0)
2017–2018	→ Adelaide United (loan)	12	(7)
2018–2019	Utah Royals FC	11	(1)
2020–2021	Chicago Red Stars	17	(3)
2020	→ HB Køge (loan)	11	(5)
2022–2025	San Diego Wave	82	(10)
2026–	Houston Dash	3	(1)

International career
2012–2014	United States U20		
2015–2017	United States U23		
- * Club domestic league appearances and goals as of March 14, 2026

Makenzy Allyson Robbe (née Doniak; born February 25, 1994) is an American professional soccer player who plays as a forward or midfielder for the Houston Dash of the National Women's Soccer League (NWSL). She played college soccer for the Virginia Cavaliers, for which she is the all-time top scorer, before being drafted by the Western New York Flash in the second round of the 2016 NWSL College Draft.

With the Flash, Robbe won an NWSL Championship in her rookie season. She then played for the North Carolina Courage, winning an additional championship title as well as two NWSL Shields. Robbe has also played for the Chicago Red Stars, Utah Royals FC, and on loan for Danish club HB Køge and Australian club Adelaide United FC. She has spent the largest part of her career with the San Diego Wave, where she contributed to an NWSL Shield win in 2023.

== Early life ==
Robbe was raised in Chino Hills, California. After originally participating in dance, she committed herself to soccer as a teenager. Robbe attended Ruben S. Ayala High School, where she led the team to the CIF Division 3 championship match in 2017. She also played club soccer for ECNL team Slammers FC.

== College career ==
In January 2011, Robbe committed to the University of Virginia as a junior in high school. During her freshman season, she appeared in all 24 of the Cavaliers games, starting 17 of them. She finished as the second-highest scorer on the team, with 10 goals. Robbe also recorded 8 assists and 28 points in total.

As a sophomore, Robbe started in all 26 of Virginia's games and scored 20 goals, which tied UVA's single-season record that Caroline Miller had set the year before. Robbe scored her first career hat trick in November 2013, in a 5–0 victory against Saint Francis. She was a semifinalist for the Hermann Trophy and a first-team NCAA All-American in 2013.

In 2014, Robbe appeared in all 26 of Virginia's games, making the starting lineup in all but one. She set the UVA single-season points record, with 51 points, and scored 20 goals for the second year in a row. From October 9 to November 7, Robbe had a seven-game goalscoring streak. She was named as a first-team NSCAA All-American and a member of the NCAA All-Tournament and ACC All-Tournament teams. Once again, she was a semifinalist for the Hermann Trophy.

In her final season of college, Robbe led the team in assists, tallying 11 throughout the season. She was recognized as the ACC Offensive Player of the Year and a Second-Team NSCAA All-American. She was also part of the NSCAA All-Southeast Region first team and the All-ACC first team. Robbe left the Virginia Cavaliers as the career leader in points (164) and goals (64). She had made 96 total appearances in her college career.

== Club career ==
=== Western New York Flash ===
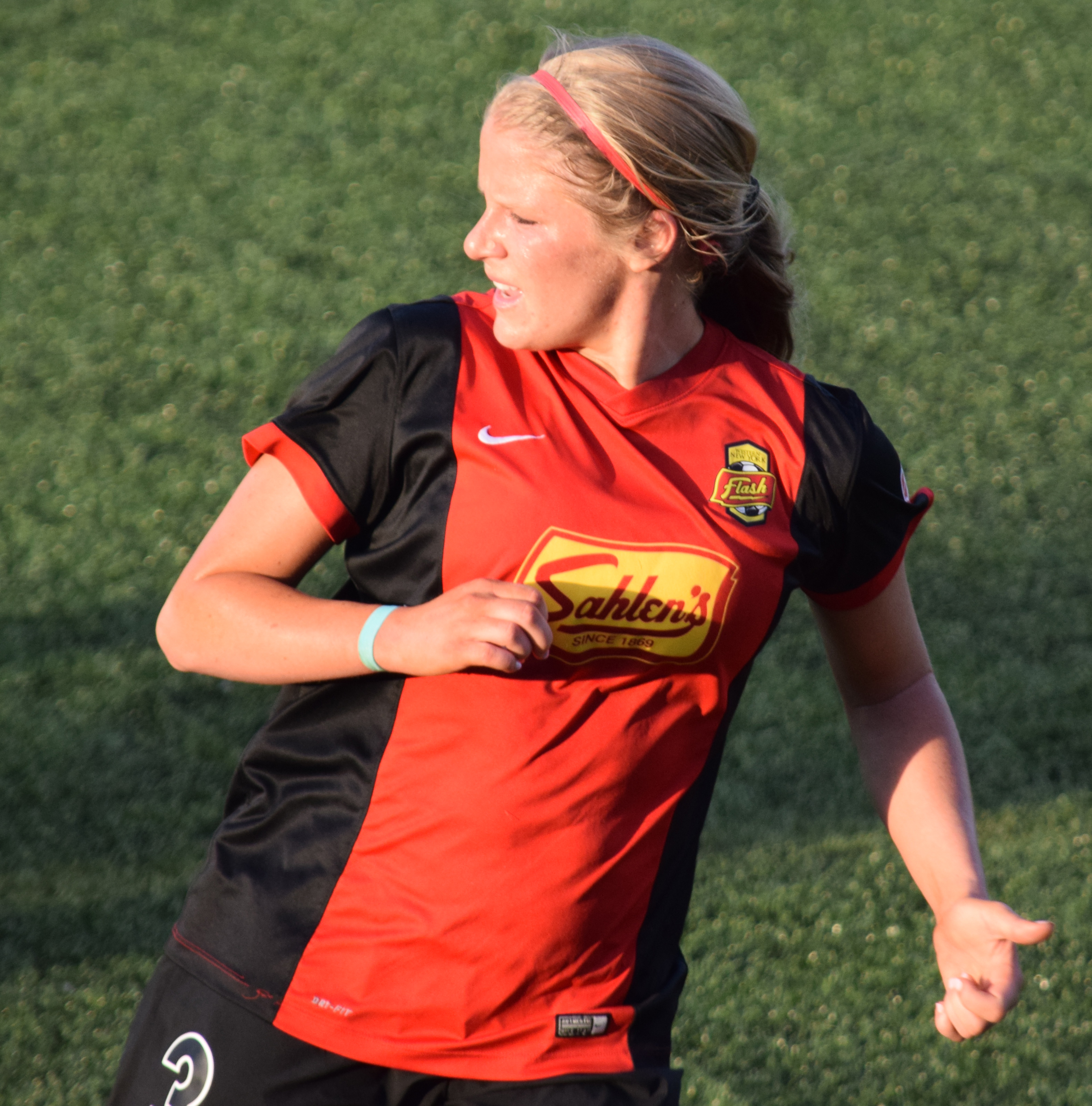
Robbe with the Flash in 2016

Robbe was drafted by Western New York Flash as the eleventh overall pick of the 2016 NWSL College Draft as the 11th overall pick. She scored her first professional goal on June 11, 2016, the game-winner in a 1–0 against the Orlando Pride. The Flash finished fourth overall in the standings and advanced to the playoffs, where they faced off against the Portland Thorns FC in the semifinals. Robbe scored a goal in the 38th minute, helping the Flash triumph over the Thorns and advance to the 2016 NWSL Championship. She played 80 minutes in the final as the Flash beat the Washington Spirit in a penalty shootout. Robbe completed her rookie NWSL season with 22 appearances and 4 goals.

=== North Carolina Courage ===
Robbe became a member of the North Carolina Courage when the Western New York Flash were purchased by the North Carolina FC Organization. She was part of the Courage team that won the 2017 NWSL Shield and advanced to the 2017 Championship Game. Robbe came in as a first half substitute in the final, replacing an injured Taylor Smith. During the match, Robbe played in several unfamiliar positions, first operating out of the midfield and then playing on the backline after an injury to Kristen Hamilton. In the end, the Courage lost to the Portland Thorns FC 1–0.

On October 27, 2017, Robbe was loaned to Australian club Adelaide United as an international player for the 2017–18 W-League season. She netted 7 goals during the season and was the team's top goalscorer. Upon returning to the Courage, Robbe tore her ACL in February 2018 and missed the entire 2018 NWSL season.

=== Utah Royals FC ===
On June 28, 2018, the Utah Royals acquired Robbe from the Courage in a trade that sent the rights for Heather O'Reilly to North Carolina. Robbe made her debut for the Royals on May 11, 2019, against the Houston Dash. She scored her first and only goal for Utah on May 26 in a 2–0 victory over the Orlando Pride. Her goal was a nominee for the NWSL Goal of the Week award, but the accolade was instead won by Bethany Balcer.

=== Chicago Red Stars ===
The Royals traded Robbe to the Chicago Red Stars on December 19, 2019, in exchange for Chicago's second round draft pick in the 2021 NWSL College Draft. She made her club debut in the 2020 NWSL Challenge Cup, appearing as a substitute in the Red Stars' 2–1 defeat to the Washington Spirit on June 27, 2020. The Red Stars ended up progressing to the playoff stages of the Challenge Cup, beating the OL Reign and Sky Blue FC before losing to the Houston Dash in the championship match. Robbe came off the bench in all three games, although she did not take a penalty kick in the quarterfinal shootout against the Reign.

On August 14, 2020, the Red Stars announced that Robbe would be starting a loan period with HB Køge, alongside teammate Emily Boyd. Robbe scored 5 goals in her loan spell with the Danish club.

Robbe made her first regular season appearance with the Red Stars on May 16, 2021. She scored her first goal for the club ten days later, contributing to a 2–0 victory over Kansas City NWSL. In 2021, the Red Stars advanced to the NWSL Playoffs. Robbe was an unused substitute for both the quarterfinal and semifinal matches, but she entered the Championship match in the 13th minute for an injured Vanessa DiBernardo. The Red Stars were defeated by the Washington Spirit, who came from behind to win the title. Robbe ended the 2021 season with 18 matches under her belt and 3 goals scored.

=== San Diego Wave ===
In December 2021, San Diego Wave FC announced it acquired the rights to Robbe, Kelsey Turnbow, and Mexican international Katie Johnson in a trade with the Chicago Red Stars. Robbe suffered a knee injury in the preseason of 2022 and missed the entire 2022 NWSL Challenge Cup. She then made her first appearance for the Wave on May 18, 2022, in a defeat to Racing Louisville FC. She scored her first goal for the club on June 19, helping San Diego register a 3–0 win over NJ/NY Gotham FC. In August 2022, Robbe was named the NWSL Player of the Week after notching 2 assists in a match against the Houston Dash. She came on as a substitute in both of the Wave's 2022 playoff games, first on October 16 against the Chicago Red Stars and then on October 23 against Portland Thorns FC. She finished the 2022 NWSL season with 18 matches played and 3 goals. The Wave subsequently exercised Robbe's contract option for 2023.

The following season, Robbe played in 22 games and scored 3 goals. She was a member of the starting lineup for the Wave in the team's semifinal match against the OL Reign and played 78 minutes in the 1–0 defeat Prior to the 2024 NWSL Season, the Wave re-signed Robbe through 2025. On June 7, 2024, Robbe came off the bench and scored for the Wave in a draw against the Orlando Pride; it would be Robbe's 8th NWSL goal as a substitute, the most of any player in league history.

Under new head coach Jonas Eidevall, Robbe found herself playing largely as a substitute in 2025. She started in only 4 of her 21 league appearances as the Wave finished sixth in the NWSL and were eliminated in the first round of the playoffs. She scored her lone goal of the season in August 2025, an 85th-minute opener against Californian rivals Angel City FC that looked to be the match-winner before opposing defender Alanna Kennedy tied the game in stoppage time. On October 11, Robbe made her 150th NWSL regular season appearance, playing in a match against the Utah Royals. She departed from San Diego as a free agent at the end of the year after having made 99 appearances for the Wave across all competitions.

=== Houston Dash ===
In January 2026, Robbe signed a one-year contract with the Houston Dash. On March 14, she made a goalscoring debut in a season-opening 1–0 win over the San Diego Wave, becoming the first NWSL player to score a winning goal against her most recent former club in her new regular-season debut. After just three appearances, she tore her ACL in training and would miss the rest of the season.

== International career ==
Robbe has represented the United States at U-20 and U-23 levels. In 2014, she was named to the USA's squad for the 2014 FIFA U-20 Women's World Cup. She also played in the 2017 La Manga Cup with the U23 team.

== Personal life ==
Robbe's mother and father were both former collegiate athletes at California State University, Long Beach. Both of Robbe's sisters, Kylie and Alyssa, also played college soccer.

She announced her engagement to Eric Robbe on November 12, 2023. The couple married in January 2025.

== Career statistics ==
=== Club ===
As of November 11, 2025

Appearances and goals by club, season and competition
Club	Season	League			Cup (Note: Includes the NWSL Challenge Cup)		Playoffs (Note: Includes NWSL Playoffs and A-League Finals Series)		Continental (Note: Includes CONCACAF W Champions Cup)		Other		Total	
Club	Season	Division	Apps	Goals	Apps	Goals	Apps	Goals	Apps	Goals	Apps	Goals	Apps	Goals
Western New York Flash	2016	NWSL	20	3	—		2	1	—		—		22	4
North Carolina Courage	2017	NWSL	22	0	—		1	0	—		—		23	0
North Carolina Courage	2018	NWSL	0	0	—		0	0	—		—		0	0
North Carolina Courage	Total		22	0	—		1	0	—		—		23	0
Adelaide United (loan)	2017–18	A-League	12	7	—		—		—		—		12	7
Utah Royals	2019	NWSL	11	1	—		—		—		—		11	1
Chicago Red Stars	2020	NWSL	— (Note: The 2020 NWSL regular season and playoffs were canceled due to the COVID-19 pandemic.)		7	0	—		—		—		7	0
Chicago Red Stars	2021	NWSL	17	3	4	0	1	0	—		—		22	3
Chicago Red Stars	Total		17	3	11	0	1	0	—		—		29	3
HB Køge (loan)	2020	Elitedivisionen	11	5	—		—		—		—		11	5
San Diego Wave FC	2022	NWSL	16	3	0	0	2	0	—		—		18	3
San Diego Wave FC	2023	NWSL	21	3	5	0	1	0	—		—		27	3
San Diego Wave FC	2024	NWSL	24	3	1	0	—		4	0	3 (Note: Includes NWSL x Liga MX Femenil Summer Cup)	0	32	3
San Diego Wave FC	2025	NWSL	21	1	—		1		—		—		22	1
San Diego Wave FC	Total		82	10	6	0	4	0	4	0	3	0	99	10
Career total			175	29	17	0	8	1	4	0	3	0	207	30

== Honors and awards ==
Virginia Cavaliers

- ACC women's soccer tournament: 2012

Western New York Flash

- NWSL Championship: 2016

North Carolina Courage

- NWSL Shield: 2017

San Diego Wave

- NWSL Shield: 2023
- NWSL Challenge Cup: 2024

Individual

- First-team All-American: 2013, 2014
- Second-team All-American: 2015
- First-team All-ACC: 2013, 2014, 2015
- ACC Offensive Player of the Year: 2015
- NCAA tournament all-tournament team: 2013, 2014
