= Danielle Colaprico =

American soccer player (born 1993)

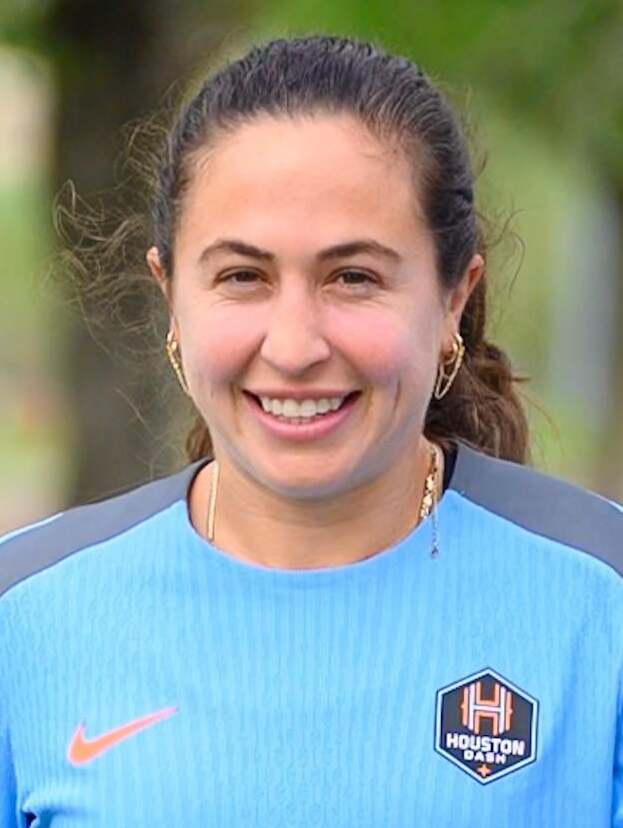
- Colaprico with the Houston Dash in 2025

Personal information
- Full name: Danielle Jessica Colaprico
- Date of birth: May 6, 1993 (age 33)
- Place of birth: Freehold Township, New Jersey, United States
- Height: 5 ft 3 in (1.60 m)
- Position: Midfielder

Team information
- Current team: Houston Dash
- Number: 24

College career
Years	Team	Apps	(Gls)
2011–2014	Virginia Cavaliers	100	(19)

Senior career*
Years	Team	Apps	(Gls)
2015–2022	Chicago Red Stars	150	(6)
2016–2018	→ Adelaide United (loan)	23	(3)
2018–2019	→ Sydney FC (loan)	9	(1)
2023–2024	San Diego Wave	45	(0)
2025–	Houston Dash	52	(2)

International career^{‡}
2014–2016	United States U23		
2018	United States	2	(0)
- * Club domestic league appearances and goals as of 03:12, November 8, 2026 (UTC) ‡ National team caps and goals as of January 19, 2024

Danielle Jessica Colaprico (born May 6, 1993) is an American professional soccer player who plays as a midfielder for the Houston Dash in the National Women's Soccer League (NWSL). She previously played for NWSL club Chicago Red Stars and Adelaide United and Sydney FC in the Australian W-League. She was named the NWSL Rookie of the Year in 2015. Colaprico made two appearances for the United States national team in 2018; she previously represented the United States on the under-23 national team.

== Early life ==
Colaprico grew up in Freehold Township, New Jersey and attended Red Bank Catholic High School.

== College career ==
Originally from Freehold, New Jersey, Colaprico attended the University of Virginia where she played for the Cavaliers from 2011 to 2014. She finished her collegiate career as the program's all-time leader in assists (44) and appearances (100).

== Club career ==
Colaprico with the Houston Dash in 2026

=== Chicago Red Stars, 2015–2022 ===
Colaprico was selected by the Chicago Red Stars as the ninth overall pick of the 2015 NWSL College Draft in January 2015. She scored her first goal for the team during a match against Sky Blue FC on May 2 helping Chicago win 1–0. On September 14, 2015, the NWSL announced that Colaprico was voted the NWSL Rookie of the Year, beating fellow finalists Sofia Huerta and Sam Mewis. Colaprico was named to the NWSL second XI in 2015, 2016 & 2017.

Colaprico departed Red Stars at the end of the 2022 NWSL season.

==== Loan to Adelaide United, 2016–2018 ====
In October 2016, Colaprico was loaned to Australian club Adelaide United along with her Red Star teammates Katie Naughton and Sofia Huerta. Colaprico re-signed with the club in October 2017, joining her Chicago teammates Katie Naughton and Alyssa Mautz.

==== Loan to Sydney FC ====
It was announced on September 28, 2018, that Colaprico would be joining Sydney FC in the W-League for the 2018–2019 season. She was one of four American players joining the club, alongside former Red Stars teammate Sofia Huerta, Aubrey Bledsoe of the Washington Spirit and Savannah McCaskill of Sky Blue FC. Colaprico appeared in 11 games for Sydney. She started both playoff games, helping Sydney win the 2018-19 W-League Championship.

=== San Diego Wave FC, 2023–2024 ===
Colaprico signed with San Diego Wave Fútbol Club on December 5, 2022. She signed a two-year deal with the Californian club.

At the end of her second season, Colaprico was out of contract with the Wave. The club later announced that she would not be returning to San Diego and would instead be exploring opportunities as a free agent.

=== Houston Dash, 2025– ===
On Jan. 21, 2025, the Houston Dash announced that they had signed Colaprico to a contract through the 2026 season. In 2025, she appeared in all 26 regular-season games, starting all of them.

== International career ==
Colaprico has represented the United States at the under-23 level. In February 2015, she scored a goal during the team's 2–0 defeat of Norway at the 2015 Six Nations Tournament in La Manga, Spain. The team won all three of its games at the tournament to win the tournament.

On November 24, 2015, Colaprico was called up to the full national team's training camp in preparation for friendly matches at the end of the victory tour organized to celebrate the winning of the 2015 FIFA Women's World Cup. After a long pause, Colaprico received her second call up to the senior team on October 6, 2016.

Colaprico was included on the preliminary roster for the 2018 CONCACAF Women's Championship but was not named to the final 20-player roster. She received a call-up to USWNT camp in Europe for a pair of friendlies against Portugal and Scotland in November 2018. This was her first call-up in two years. She received her first cap on November 8, 2018, coming on as a second-half substitute against Portugal.

Colaprico was named to the roster for the 2019 SheBelieves Cup but was forced to withdraw due to a groin injury.

== Career statistics ==
=== Club ===
As of November 2, 2025

Appearances and goals by club, season and competition
Club	Season	League			Cup (Note: Includes the NWSL Challenge Cup)		Playoffs (Note: Includes NWSL Playoffs and A-League Finals Series)		Continental (Note: Includes CONCACAF W Champions Cup)		Other		Total	
Club	Season	Division	Apps	Goals	Apps	Goals	Apps	Goals	Apps	Goals	Apps	Goals	Apps	Goals
Chicago Red Stars	2015	NWSL	20	2	—		1	0	—		—		21	2
Chicago Red Stars	2016	NWSL	20	0	—		1	0	—		—		21	0
Chicago Red Stars	2017	NWSL	23	1	—		1	0	—		—		24	1
Chicago Red Stars	2018	NWSL	24	1	—		1	0	—		—		25	1
Chicago Red Stars	2019	NWSL	22	1	—		2	0	—		—		24	1
Chicago Red Stars	2020	NWSL	— (Note: The 2020 NWSL regular season and playoffs were canceled due to the COVID-19 pandemic.)		7	0	—		—		4 (Note: Includes NWSL Fall Series)	0	11	0
Chicago Red Stars	2021	NWSL	19	0	4	0	3	0	—		—		26	0
Chicago Red Stars	2022	NWSL	22	1	6	0	1	0	—		—		29	1
Chicago Red Stars	Total		150	6	17	0	10	0	—		4	0	181	6
Adelaide United (loan)	2016–17	W-League	12	2	—		—		—		—		12	2
Adelaide United (loan)	2017–18	W-League	11	1	—		—		—		—		11	1
Adelaide United (loan)	Total		23	3	—		—		—		—		23	3
Sydney FC (loan)	2018–19	W-League	9	1	—		2	0	—		—		11	1
San Diego Wave FC	2023	NWSL	22	0	5	1	1	0	—		—		28	1
San Diego Wave FC	2024	NWSL	23	0	1	0	—		2	0	3 (Note: Includes NWSL x Liga MX Femenil Summer Cup)	0	29	0
San Diego Wave FC	Total		46	0	6	1	1	0	2	0	3	0	58	1
Houston Dash	2025	NWSL	24	0	—		0	0	—		0	0	24	0
Career total			250	10	23	1	13	0	2	0	7	0	295	11

== Honors ==
Sydney

- W-League Championship: 2018–19

San Diego Wave

- NWSL Shield: 2023
- NWSL Challenge Cup: 2024
