= Rachel Hill =

American soccer player (born 1995)

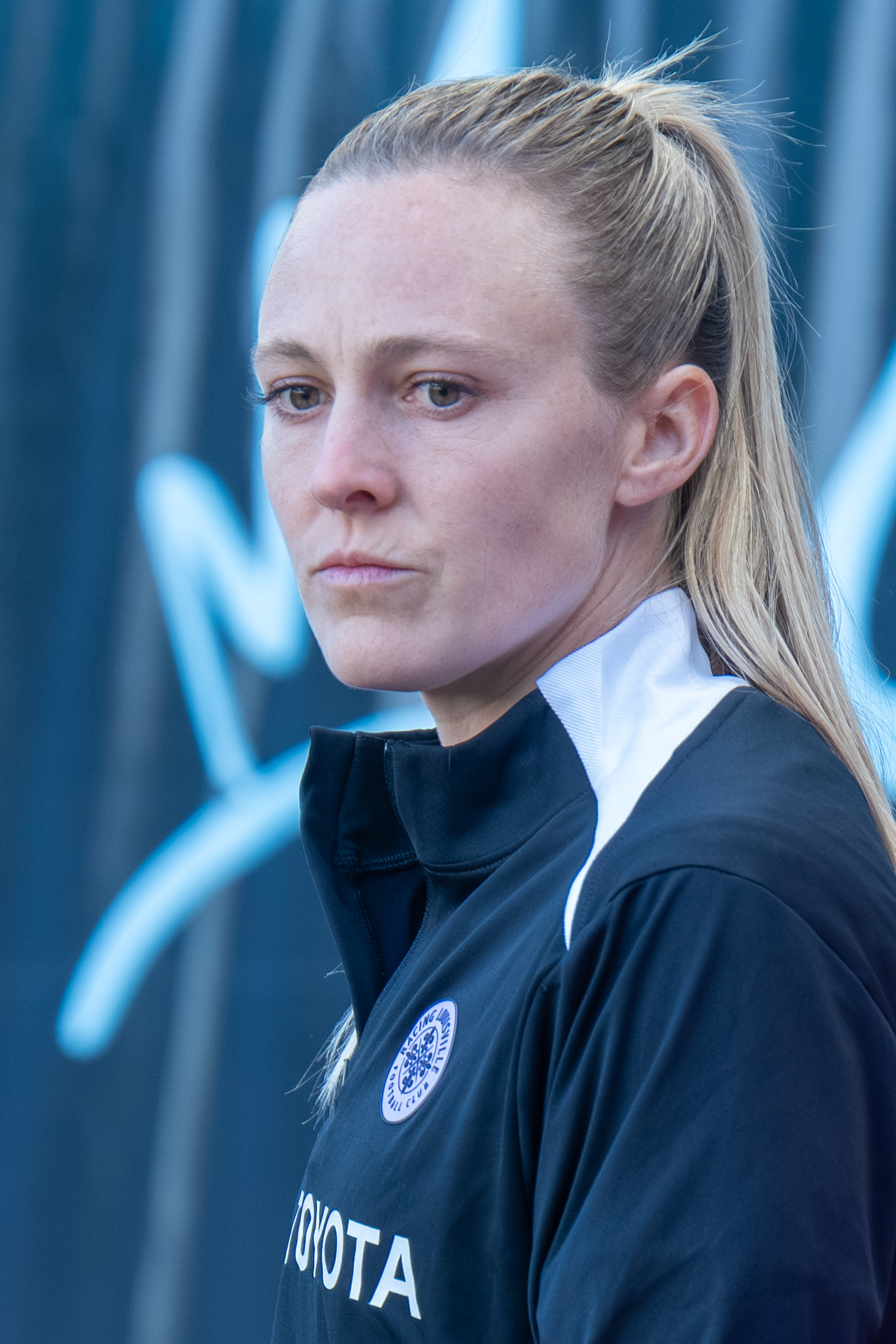
- Hill with Bay FC in 2026

Personal information
- Full name: Rachel Morgan Hill
- Date of birth: April 17, 1995 (age 31)
- Place of birth: Rollinsford, New Hampshire, United States
- Height: 5 ft 5 in (1.65 m)
- Position: Right winger

Team information
- Current team: Racing Louisville
- Number: 21

Youth career
- 2008–2012: Seacoast United
- 2012–2013: Seacoast United Phantoms

College career
Years	Team	Apps	(Gls)
2013–2016	UConn Huskies	89	(61)

Senior career*
Years	Team	Apps	(Gls)
2017–2019	Orlando Pride	60	(11)
2017–2019	→ Perth Glory (loan)	26	(15)
2020–2022	Chicago Red Stars	47	(5)
2020	→ Linköpings FC (loan)	8	(2)
2023	San Diego Wave FC	18	(0)
2024–2025	Bay FC	41	(3)
2026–	Racing Louisville	18	(0)

International career^{‡}
2014	United States U20	6	(1)
2016–2018	United States U23		
- * Club domestic league appearances and goals as of 06:02, November 2, 2026 (UTC) ‡ National team caps and goals as of June 29, 2017

Rachel Morgan Hill (born April 17, 1995) is an American professional soccer player who plays as a right winger for Racing Louisville FC of the National Women's Soccer League (NWSL).

Hill played college soccer for the UConn Huskies, earning first-team All-American honors in 2015. She was drafted in the second round of the 2017 NWSL College Draft and immediately had her rights traded to the Orlando Pride, where she played three seasons. She went on loan to Perth Glory twice and was named in the W-League PFA Team of the Season both seasons. She was traded to the Chicago Red Stars in 2020, scoring the lone goal for the club in their loss in the 2021 NWSL Championship. In 2023, she signed with the San Diego Wave and won the NWSL Shield in her only season with the club. She was then selected by Bay FC with the fifth overall pick in the 2024 NWSL Expansion Draft.

She represented the United States on the under-20 and under-23 teams, appearing at the 2014 FIFA U-20 Women's World Cup.

== Early life ==
Hill has two brothers, Zach and Jake, and played indoor soccer with them on a team coached by her father, Mike. Hill played youth soccer from age 4 until U14 with ROSO S.C. (Rollinsford Somersworth Soccer Club). She started in the town recreation program at age 4 and at age 11 started playing travel soccer with the ROSO U13 Girls travel team in 2005 and played with ROSO until 2008. She played youth soccer for Seacoast United U-14 through U-18, winning Super Y-League national championships in 2009 (U-14) and 2011 (U-16) and playing for the WPSL Seacoast United Phantoms in 2012 and 2013.

== College career ==
Hill was a two-time semi-finalist for the MAC Hermann Trophy as a forward for the University of Connecticut Huskies, in 2015 and 2016. Hill was a 1st Team NSCAA All-American in 2015 and a 2nd team All-American in 2016. She scored 61 goals in 89 collegiate appearances, ranking second all-time in career goals and 4th all time in points with 140 among University of Connecticut women's soccer players. She was the American Athletic Conference (AAC) midfielder of the year in 2016, Offensive player of the year in 2015 & 2014 and Rookie of the year in 2013.

== Club career ==
=== Orlando Pride ===
Portland Thorns FC selected Hill with the 14th pick in the 2017 NWSL College Draft and subsequently traded her to the Orlando Pride in exchange for first- and fourth-round picks in the 2018 NWSL College Draft. The Pride signed Hill in May 2017 after her college graduation, and she earned her first start on June 3.

Hill scored her first professional goal on June 28, 2017, a game-winner against Sky Blue FC. She finished her rookie season with three goals, one assist from only 14 games, 8 of which were starts. After her contract option exercised for 2018, Hill went on to play 21 games in 2018, but a nagging injury lead to her starting only seven of them. She scored four goals tying Marta as third best for the Pride. Hill had a new contract offer given at the end of the 2018 season.

==== Perth Glory (loan) ====
On October 19, 2017, Hill joined Australian club Perth Glory on loan for the 2017–18 W-League season. During her first season at Perth she finished with 9 goals, the third-most goals in the league and 6 assists, the most assists in the league.

She re-signed a loan agreement for 2018–2019 and ended the season with a further 6 goals as the team finished runners up in the Grand Final.

=== Chicago Red Stars ===
On January 16, 2020, Orlando traded Hill to the Chicago Red Stars during the 2020 NWSL College Draft along with a third-round pick, Orlando's natural first-round selection in the 2021 NWSL College Draft and an undisclosed amount of allocation money in exchange for the No. 3 overall selection and a third-round pick in the 2020 draft. With the season disrupted by the COVID-19 pandemic, Hill eventually made her Red Stars debut during the 2020 NWSL Challenge Cup. Hill scored the lone goal for Chicago in the 2021 NWSL Championship Match losing to the Washington Spirit 2-1. Hill completed her time with the team in 2022.

==== Linköpings FC (loan) ====
In August 2020, Hill joined Swedish Damallsvenskan club Linköpings FC on loan.

=== San Diego Wave ===
On December 2, 2022, Hill was signed in free agency by San Diego Wave FC. The Wave signed Hill to a two-year contract running through the 2024 season. Hill made her first appearance for the club on April 15, 2023, playing in a 0-1 defeat to the OL Reign. Hill entered the match as a substitute for Jaedyn Shaw, coming on in the 87th minute of the game. She also earned a yellow card in her debut. Hill ended up playing in 18 regular season matches for the Wave and the team won the 2023 NWSL Shield with the best regular season record.

=== Bay FC ===
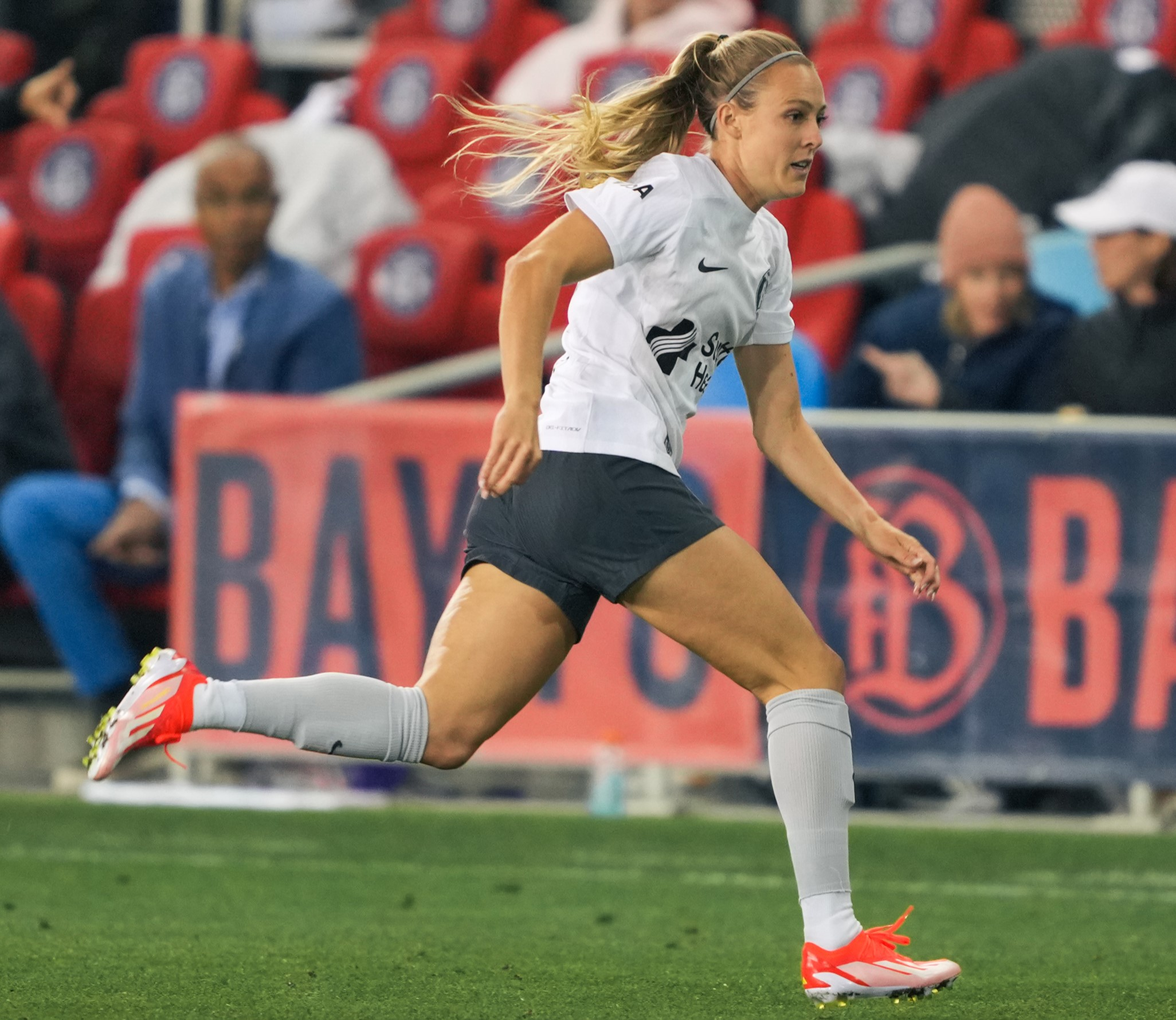
Hill with Bay FC in 2024

Hill was selected by Bay FC with the 5th overall pick in the 2024 NWSL expansion draft. She made her debut for the Californian club in Bay FC's first-ever game, a 1-0 victory over Angel City FC.

=== Racing Louisville ===
On December 23, 2025, Hill was announced to have signed a two-year contract with Racing Louisville FC.

== International career ==
Hill appeared for the United States U-20 national team in five 2014 CONCACAF Women's U-20 Championship matches in 2014, starting in four matches, scoring one goal, and leading the team with five assists as an attacking midfielder. Hill appeared for the U-20s at the 2014 FIFA U-20 Women's World Cup as a substitute against Brazil in group play.

US Soccer called Hill up to the U-23 national team in 2016 U-23 Women's Nordic Tournament in June 2016 against England, Norway, and Sweden, a tournament that the United States won.

== Career statistics ==
=== Club ===
As of match played 10 November 2024

Club	League	Season	League		Cup (Note: Includes the NWSL Challenge Cup)		Playoffs (Note: Includes W-League Finals Series and NWSL Playoffs)		Other (Note: Includes NWSL x Liga MX Femenil Summer Cup)		Total	
Club	League	Season	Apps	Goals	Apps	Goals	Apps	Goals	Apps	Goals	Apps	Goals
Orlando Pride	NWSL	2017	15	3	—		—		—		15	3
Orlando Pride	NWSL	2018	21	4	—		—		—		21	4
Orlando Pride	NWSL	2019	23	4	—		—		—		23	4
Orlando Pride	Total		60	11	—		—		—		60	11
Perth Glory (loan)	W-League	2017–18	12	9	—		—		—		12	9
Perth Glory (loan)	W-League	2018–19	12	5	—		2	1	—		14	6
Perth Glory (loan)	Total		26	15	—		2	1	—		26	15
Chicago Red Stars	NWSL	2020	— (Note: The 2020 NWSL regular season and playoffs were canceled due to the COVID-19 pandemic.)		7	1	—		—		7	1
Chicago Red Stars	NWSL	2021	26	4	3	0	3	1	—		32	5
Chicago Red Stars	NWSL	2022	21	1	0	0	1	0	—		22	1
Chicago Red Stars	Total		47	5	10	1	4	1	—		61	7
Linköpings FC (loan)	Damallsvenskan	2020	8	2	—		—		—		8	2
San Diego Wave FC	NWSL	2023	18	0	5	0	1	0	—		24	0
Bay FC	NWSL	2024	19	1	—		—		3	0	22	1
Career total			168	33	15	1	7	2	3	0	191	35

== Honors ==
San Diego Wave

- NWSL Shield: 2023

United States U-20

- CONCACAF Women's U-20 Championship: 2014

Individual

- W-League PFA Team of the Season: 2017–18, 2018–19
- First-team All-American: 2015
- Second-team All-American: 2016
- First-team All-AAC: 2013, 2014, 2015, 2016
- AAC Offensive Player of the Year: 2014, 2015
- AAC Midfielder of the Year: 2016
- AAC tournament Offensive MOP: 2014, 2016
