= Zions Bank Stadium =

Association football stadium in Herriman, Utah, United States

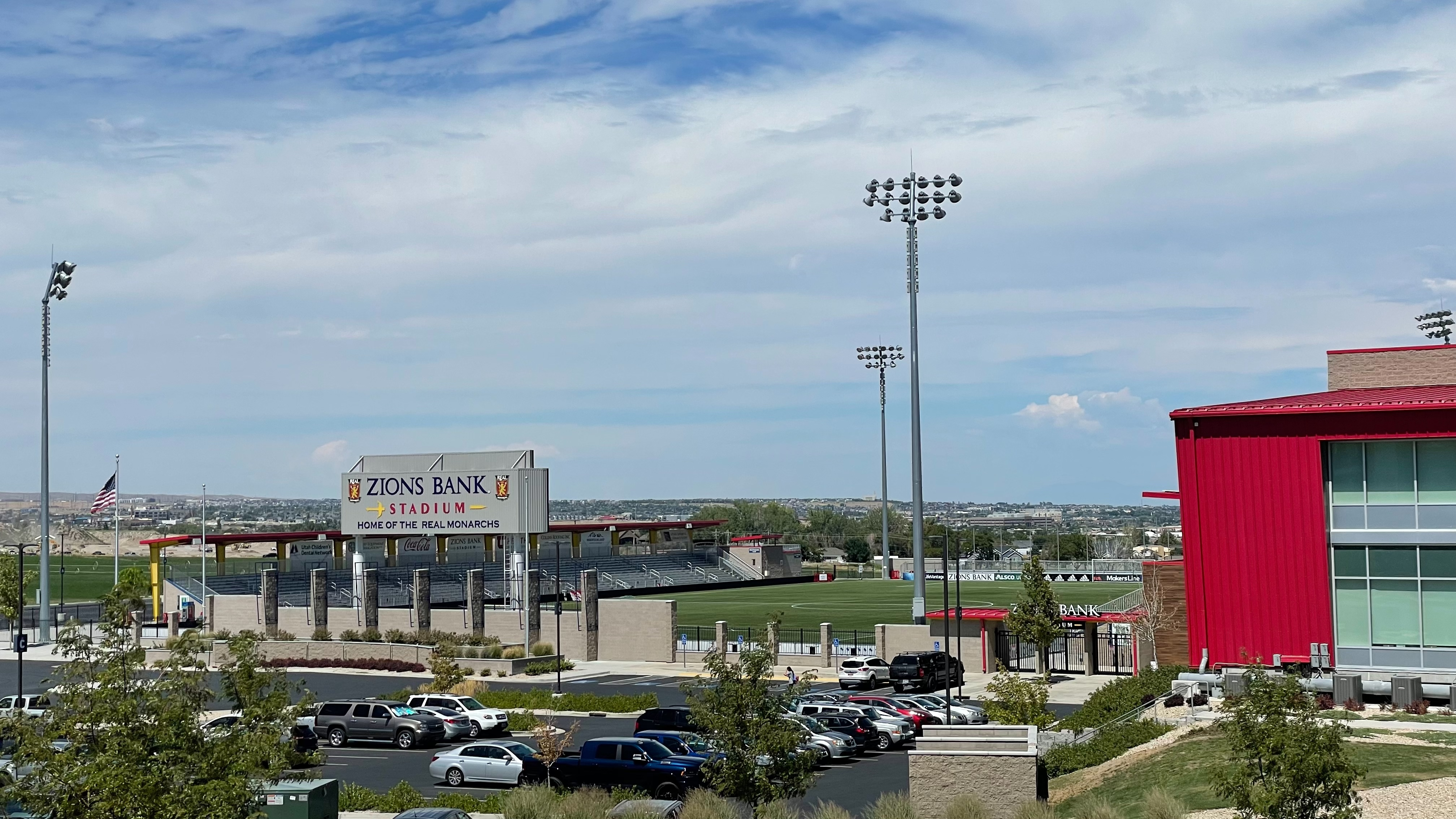
- Interactive map of Zions Bank Stadium
- Address: 14788 South Academy Parkway; Herriman, Utah 84096
- Coordinates: 40°29′02″N 111°58′46″W
- Owner: Miller Sports + Entertainment (Gail Miller)
- Operator: Real Monarchs
- Capacity: 5,000
- Field size: 120 by 75 yards (110 m × 69 m)

Construction
- Groundbreaking: August 2016
- Opened: April 20, 2018

Tenants
- Real Monarchs (MLSNP) (2018–present); Utah Warriors (MLR) (2018–2025); Salt Lake Shred (UFA) (2022–present); Utah Archers (PLL) (2024–present)

Zions Bank Stadium is a soccer stadium in Herriman, Utah, United States, with a seating capacity of 5,000. The stadium is home to Real Monarchs, a MLS Next Pro team affiliated with Real Salt Lake of Major League Soccer; the Utah Warriors, a Major League Rugby team; the Utah Archers of the Premier Lacrosse League; and the Salt Lake Shred, an Ultimate Frisbee Association team.

The stadium is part of the $78 million Zions Bank Real Academy, which includes the academy and training facilities for Real Salt Lake, and is near the Mountain View Corridor.

In May 2017, Real Salt Lake and Zions Bank announced a sponsorship deal that would give the bank naming rights to the stadium.

== Facilities ==
Zions Bank Stadium is a 5,000-seat stadium at the center of the Zions Bank Real Academy, a 42-acre (17 ha) sports campus in Herriman, Utah. The pitch measures 120 by 75 yards (110 by 69 m), the same dimensions as Rio Tinto Stadium (the home of Real Salt Lake). The east side includes a press box, an owners suite, and hospitality spaces on the east side of the pitch. The stadium's roof has 9,800 square feet (910 m^{2}) of solar panels that provide 166 kW of electricity.

== History ==
Real Salt Lake chose Herriman as the site of the stadium and academy in early 2016. The club had previously considered options in the West Valley City area and planned an 8,000-seat stadium at the Utah State Fairpark until negotiations in the state government fell apart. Construction began in August 2016 and the academy's charter school opened in August 2017. The charter school, built to serve players and residents of nearby areas, focuses on a STEM curriculum and includes an on-site dormitory.

Due to the stadium's proximity to the academy's charter school, 100 feet (30 m) away, it was unable to obtain a liquor license and was not initially able to serve alcoholic beverages. Under state laws, the license cannot be issued to businesses whose entrance is within 200 feet (61 m) of a school. In response, Real Salt Lake relocated the entrance to the northwest corner, at a cost of $250,000, and received a license from the state liquor commission. The stadium also features a 166-kilowatt array of solar panels on its roof.

The campus was named for Zions Bank in May 2017 following the signing of a naming rights sponsorship. Real Salt Lake and Real Monarchs began using the indoor training facilities in January 2018, replacing preseason camps held in California and Arizona. The stadium was originally scheduled to open on March 31, 2018, but moved back to April after construction delays.

The first sporting event at the stadium, a Utah Warriors match against the Prairie Wolf Pack, took place on April 20 and was attended by 3,143 people. Real Monarchs played their first home match on April 30, a scoreless draw against Las Vegas Lights FC that was attended by 4,065 spectators. In January 2022, the stadium and Real Monarchs were sold to David Blitzer and Ryan Smith. The Utah Royals of the National Women's Soccer League announced plans in 2023 to build their own training facilities at the Zions Bank Real Academy, expanding the campus by 12,260 square feet (1,139 m^{2}). On April 18, 2025, Miller Sports + Entertainment, led by former Utah Jazz owner Gail Miller, acquired the stadium as part of a $600 million deal that included Real Monarchs' parent franchise Real Salt Lake.

== Other events ==
=== Soccer ===
In June and July 2020, Zions Bank Stadium and Rio Tinto Stadium hosted the 2020 NWSL Challenge Cup, a special competition to begin the National Women's Soccer League's 2020 season after it was delayed due to the COVID-19 pandemic. Zions Bank Stadium hosted the competition's early rounds, with play moving to Rio Tinto Stadium for the semifinals and final.

=== Lacrosse ===
The 2020 season of the Premier Lacrosse League was moved to Zions Bank Stadium, with the Championship Series played in July and August. The teams and support staff were housed at the Real Salt Lake Training Academy under quarantine. A permanent team, the Utah Archers, is set to be based at the stadium but continue the league's touring schedule.

=== Ultimate frisbee ===
The Salt Lake Shred of the Ultimate Frisbee Association began playing home games at Zions Bank Stadium in 2022.
