= Julia Bingham =

American professional soccer player

Personal information
- Full name: Julia Patricia Bingham
- Date of birth: May 25, 1998 (age 28)
- Place of birth: Ontario, California, United States
- Height: 5 ft 4 in (1.63 m)
- Position: Defender

Youth career
- –2016: Slammers FC

College career
Years	Team	Apps	(Gls)
2016–2019	USC Trojans	89	(1)

Senior career*
Years	Team	Apps	(Gls)
2020	Chicago Red Stars	0	(0)

International career
- United States U18
- * Club domestic league appearances and goals as of July 1, 2020

Julia Patricia Bingham (born May 25, 1998) is an American professional soccer player who most recently played as a defender for National Women's Soccer League (NWSL) club Chicago Red Stars.

== Club career ==
Bingham made her NWSL debut in the 2020 NWSL Challenge Cup on July 1, 2020.

== Honors ==
USC Trojans

- NCAA Division I Women's Soccer Championship: 2016
