= Zoe Redei =

American soccer player

Personal information
- Full name: Zoe Abigail Redei
- Date of birth: October 8, 1997 (age 29)
- Place of birth: Atlanta, Georgia, United States
- Height: 5 ft 4 in (1.63 m)
- Position: Forward

Youth career
- –2016: Chicago Eclipse Select

College career
Years	Team	Apps	(Gls)
2016–2019	North Carolina Tar Heels	75	(13)

Senior career*
Years	Team	Apps	(Gls)
2020	Chicago Red Stars	0	(0)

International career
2013	United States U17		
2015	United States U20		
- * Club domestic league appearances and goals as of July 1, 2020

Zoe Abigail Redei (born October 8, 1997) is an American professional soccer player who plays as a forward.

== Club career ==
=== Chicago Red Stars ===
Redei made her NWSL debut in the 2020 NWSL Challenge Cup on July 1, 2020.

== Personal life ==
Redei is of Hungarian descent through her father.
