= Zoey Goralski =

American soccer player

Personal information
- Full name: Zoey Glenn Goralski
- Date of birth: January 22, 1995 (age 31)
- Place of birth: Naperville, Illinois, United States
- Height: 5 ft 3 in (1.60 m)
- Position: Defender

College career
Years	Team	Apps	(Gls)
2013–2017	UCLA Bruins	88	(3)

Senior career*
Years	Team	Apps	(Gls)
2018–2021	Chicago Red Stars	5	(0)

International career
2011–2012	United States U17		
2013	United States U20		
2017	United States U23		
- * Club domestic league appearances and goals as of May 9, 2020

Zoey Glenn Goralski (born January 22, 1995) is an American former soccer player. She played for the Chicago Red Stars in the National Women's Soccer League. She was previously a part of the U-15 and U-17 player pool for the women's national team and played for the U-20 women's national team and the U-23 women's national soccer team.

== Early life ==
Goralski was born in Naperville, Illinois to Ed and Teri Goralski along with two sisters, Jamie and Naomi. She began her soccer career with Team Chicago Academy Botafogo and went on to play for Neuqua Valley High School from 2009 to 2013.

While attending Neuqua Valley, Goralski was awarded NSCAA All-American in 2011 and 2012. She scored 45 goals, ranking her fourth on Neuqua's career scoring list. Goralski was placed in the United States U-15 women's national soccer team player pool in 2010. She was named Gatorade State Player of the Year finalist and Illinois High School Coaches Association Player of the Year in 2012. During this same year, Goralski was placed on the ODP Thanksgiving Interregional Best XI team.

== College career ==
Goralski attended the University of California, Los Angeles in 2013 to major in Physiological Sciences. She joined the UCLA Bruins as a Redshirted player due to her torn ACL and began playing in 2014 where she played on the All-Freshman team, scoring two goals with three assists in the 22 games played. In 2015, Goralski played 1414 minutes and was a starter in 18 of the 19 games for the season, followed by starting 21 of the 22 games in 2016. As a senior, Goralski was the team co-captain and was recognized on the UCLA Athletic Director's Honor Roll 11 times as well as Pac-12 All-American three times. She was selected for the Senior CLASS Award for her academics and athleticism. She was placed on the College Cup All-Tournament Team and started 23 of the 25 games for this season, playing a total of 88 of the 90 games for all four years as a Bruin. She brought the UCLA team to the national championship game in 2017. Goralski graduated in 2017 and contributed a total of three goals and 15 assists during her collegiate career.

== Club career ==
=== Chicago Red Stars ===
Goralski was drafted as a third round pick into the Chicago Red Stars program in January 2018. She practices with the first team but is a starter for the Red Stars Reserves team. In the 2018 season, the Red Stars Reserve team had a record of 7–0, with Goralski starting four games with three assists. She was pulled up to the first team for a game in May 2019 against Washington. Although they lost 2–0, Goralski subbed in for 15 minutes as a defender as her debut.

On December 8, 2021, Goralski announced her retirement from professional soccer.

== International career ==
In 2010, Goralski attended a training camp as a defender as part of the United States U-15 Women's National Team player pool at the Olympic Training Center in Chula Vista, California. She joined the United States U-17 Women's National Team in 2011 for training camps in Florida as Player Pool pick to possibly play in the 2012 FIFA U-17 Women's World Cup, playing in games against their Germany counterpart. She also took part in games against Loyola Marymount, Fullerton, and Japan. In 2013, Goralski joined the United States U-20 Women's National Team. She played in the game against UCLA and was selected for the 12 Nations Tournament in La Manga, Spain, where she tore her ACL playing Germany. Goralski joined the United States U-23 Women's National Team in 2017 where she played Houston Dash and Thorns FC in Seattle's Thorns Spring Invitational. In the 2017 Women's U-23 Open Nordic Tournament, Goralski defended against Norway, England, and Sweden.

== See also ==
- Chicago Red Stars
- UCLA Bruins women's soccer
