= Katja Koroleva =

American soccer referee (born 1987)

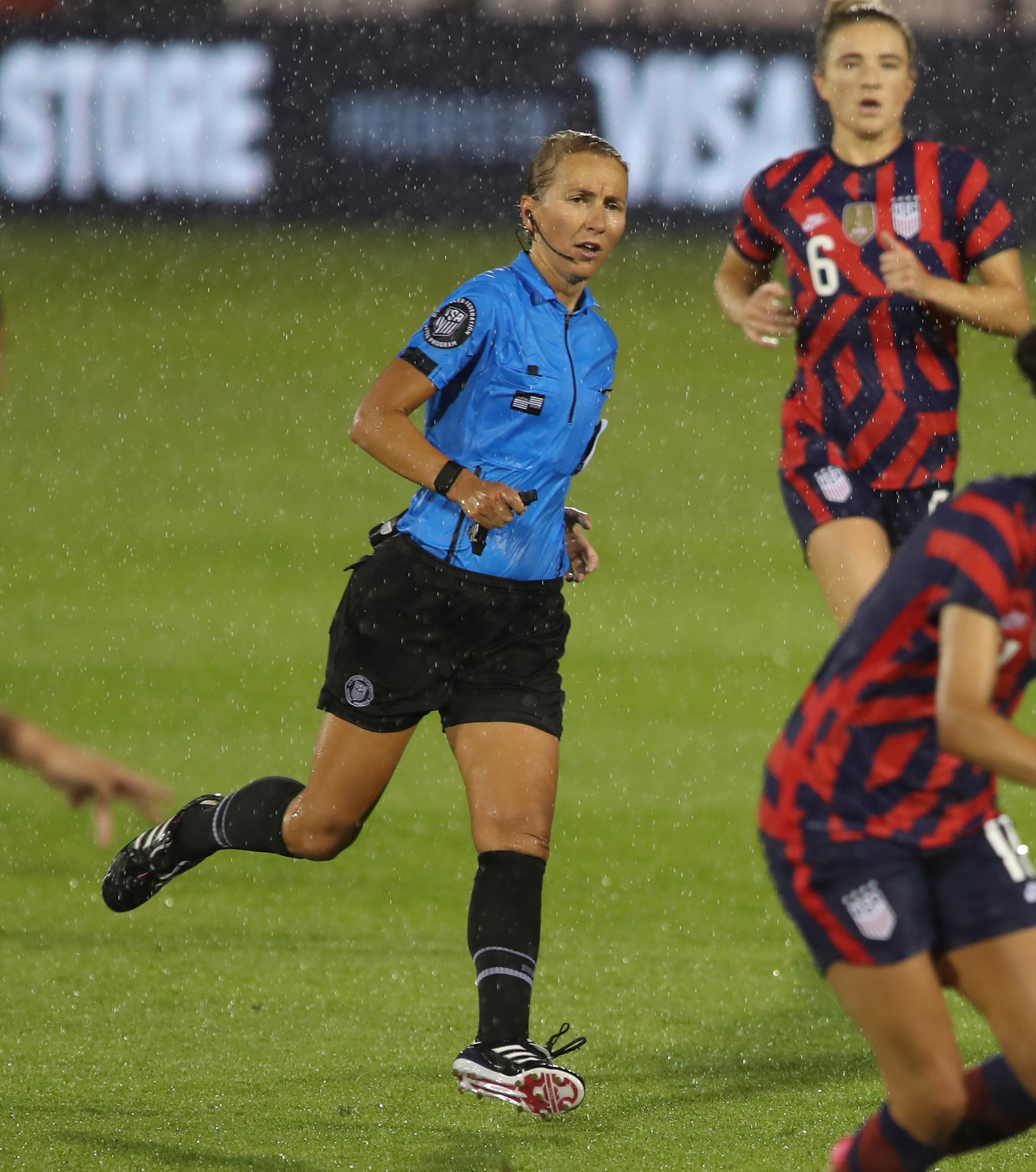
- Koroleva refereeing a USWNT match in 2021
- Full name: Ekaterina Koroleva
- Born: March 20, 1987 (age 39); Novosibirsk, Russian SFSR, Soviet Union

Domestic
Years	League	Role
2013–	NWSL	Referee
2015–	United Soccer League	Referee
2017–	MLS	Video Assistant Referee

International
Years	League	Role
2014–	FIFA listed	Referee

Ekaterina "Katja" Koroleva (Russian: Екатерина «Катя» Королева; born March 20, 1987) is an international soccer referee for the Professional Referee Organization (PRO), which she joined in 2013. Born in the Soviet Union, she represents the United States.

She is also a mid-level practitioner at Cascade Valley Hospital in Arlington, Washington, United States. In April 2020, CONCACAF recognized Koroleva for her service as a frontline healthcare worker during the COVID-19 pandemic.

== Officiating ==
=== Youth career ===
Koroleva began officiating at the age of 15 in order to help pay for youth soccer fees in the Midwest Regional League.

=== Domestic leagues ===
Koroleva officiates matches in the National Women's Soccer League (NWSL) and the United Soccer League as a referee, and in Major League Soccer as a video assistant referee. Koroleva was the center referee for the NWSL Championship in 2015 and 2023.

=== International tournaments ===
In August 2016, Koroleva was appointed to be a referee at the 2016 FIFA U-17 Women's World Cup in Jordan. She was appointed in August 2018 to referee at the 2018 FIFA U-17 Women's World Cup in Uruguay.

Koroleva was appointed to be an official at the 2019 FIFA Women's World Cup in France. She also participated in the 2022 FIFA U-17 Women's World Cup as a video assistant referee.

On January 9, 2023, FIFA appointed her to the officiating pool for the 2023 FIFA Women's World Cup in Australia and New Zealand. She was one of two center referees selected from the United States to participate in the tournament. She officiated the quarterfinals match between England and Colombia.

== Relatives ==
Koroleva was born in the Soviet Union, and her family migrated to Denmark, then to Iowa. Koroleva was raised by her single mother, Irina Koroleva, a geneticist and molecular biologist who migrated to the United States after being offered a research job at a university. Irina Koroleva also took up officiating soccer matches in the early 2000s.
