= NWSL Challenge Cup =

Women's soccer competition in the US

- Organizer(s): National Women's Soccer League
- Founded: May 27, 2020; 6 years ago
- Region: United States
- Current champion(s): Gotham FC (1st title)
- Most championships: North Carolina Courage (2 titles)
- Broadcaster: Amazon Prime Video
- Website: https://www.nwslsoccer.com/
- 2026 NWSL Challenge Cup

The NWSL Challenge Cup is an annual supercup competition organized by the National Women's Soccer League (NWSL), a division 1 women's league in the United States soccer league system. The current (2026) cup holder is Gotham FC, which defeated the Kansas City Current 2–0 on June 26, 2026.

The NWSL Challenge Cup was first announced in 2020 as a one-off, league-wide tournament to mark the league's return to action from the COVID-19 pandemic. It was the first top-tier professional sports league in the United States to restart after COVID-19 lockdowns began. Subsequently, the NWSL announced that it would return as an annual league cup tournament. Between the 2023 and 2024 editions, the NWSL announced that the Challenge Cup would change from a league-wide tournament to a single-game supercup.

== Format ==
=== 2020–2023 ===
For the first four years of the tournament, all NWSL teams began a group stage where they played four to six games, usually split geographically. The group stage was then followed by one or more knockout matches to determine the Cup winner. In 2020, all nine teams were to play four games each in a single pool, with eight teams advancing to the knockout stage; however, one team had to drop out due to COVID exposure, and the pool games among the remaining eight teams were used solely for seeding the knockout rounds. In 2021, the ten teams were divided into two divisions of five teams, with the two group winners qualifying for the final match. In 2022 and 2023, the twelve teams split into three groups of four, with the best runner-up joining the three group winners in a two-round knockout tournament. In 2023, the format remained the same but the tournament was moved to run concurrently with the season due to player concerns about injuries.

=== 2024 onward ===
In 2024, the NWSL Challenge Cup transitioned to a single pre-season match between the winners of the previous season's NWSL Shield and NWSL Championship, Should a team win both the Championship and Shield, the Challenge Cup is a rematch of the previous season's championship match.

== Records and statistics ==
=== Results by team ===
Team	Winners	Runners-up	Years won
North Carolina Courage	2	0	2023, 2022
Washington Spirit	1	1	2025
Houston Dash	1	0	2020
Portland Thorns FC	1	0	2021
San Diego Wave FC	1	0	2024
Gotham FC	1	2	2026
Chicago Stars FC	0	1	–
Kansas City Current	0	1	–
Racing Louisville FC	0	1	–
Orlando Pride	0	1	–

=== List of finals ===
Season	Challenge Cup format	Winners	Score	Runners-up	Venue	Attendance	Player of the Final	Tournament MVP until 2023
2020	tournament	Houston Dash	2–0	Chicago Red Stars	Rio Tinto Stadium	0 (behind closed doors)	Shea Groom (Houston Dash)	Rachel Daly (Houston Dash)
2021	tournament	Portland Thorns FC	1–1; 6–5 (p)	NJ/NY Gotham FC	Providence Park	4,000 – 5,000 (estimate)	Adrianna Franch (Portland Thorns FC)	Debinha (North Carolina Courage)
2022	tournament	North Carolina Courage	2–1	Washington Spirit	WakeMed Soccer Park	3,163	Kerolin (North Carolina Courage)	Debinha (North Carolina Courage)
2023	tournament	North Carolina Courage	2–0	Racing Louisville FC	WakeMed Soccer Park	3,068	Manaka Matsukubo (North Carolina Courage)	Kristen Hamilton (Kansas City Current)
2024	supercup	San Diego Wave FC	1–0	NJ/NY Gotham FC	Red Bull Arena	14,241	Alex Morgan (San Diego Wave FC)	
2025	supercup	Washington Spirit	1–1; 4–2 (p)	Orlando Pride	Inter&Co Stadium	8,880	Aubrey Kingsbury (Washington Spirit)	
2026	supercup	Gotham FC	2–0	Kansas City Current	ScottsMiracle-Gro Field	TBA		
