= 2020 NWSL Challenge Cup =

2020 National Women's Soccer League Challenge Cup presented by P&G and Secret

Tournament details
- Country: United States
- Venue(s): Rio Tinto Stadium; Sandy, Utah
- Dates: June 27 – July 26
- Teams: 8

Final positions
- Champions: Houston Dash (1st title)
- Runners-up: Chicago Red Stars
- Semifinalists: Portland Thorns FC; Sky Blue FC

Tournament statistics
- Matches played: 23
- Goals scored: 36 (1.57 per match)
- Top goal scorers: Rachel Daly; Shea Groom; Lynn Williams; (3 goals each)

Awards
- MVP: Rachel Daly

The 2020 NWSL Challenge Cup was a tournament during the 2020 National Women's Soccer League season to mark the league's return to action from the COVID-19 pandemic. It was the first professional team sports event to return to play in the United States. The final, held on July 26, was won by the Houston Dash 2-0 over the Chicago Red Stars.

Originally planned as a one-off tournament, the NWSL announced that the Challenge Cup would return in the 2021 NWSL season as a league cup competition.

== Format ==
The Challenge Cup was originally planned as a 25-game tournament featuring all nine NWSL clubs. However, on June 22, the Orlando Pride withdrew following six positive COVID-19 tests among players and four more among non-playing staff. On June 23, the NWSL released the revised schedule of an 8-team, 23-game tournament.

On June 22, the NWSL announced the full rules and regulations for the tournament. Each team would play four games in the preliminary round, with eight teams advancing to a single-elimination knockout bracket. Teams would be ranked by points in the preliminary round, with three points for a win and one for a draw, and the rankings used to determine seeding in the knockout bracket.

=== Effects of the COVID-19 pandemic ===
To lessen the impact of fixture congestion caused by the COVID-19 pandemic, NWSL clubs were permitted to roster up to 28 players (a temporary increase by two), have the full roster available for substitutions during games, and make up to five substitutions in accordance with temporary rules and regulations from the International Football Association Board. There would be no extra time; any games in the knockout round that were tied after regulation would go straight to a penalty shoot-out. Final tournament rosters had to be submitted by June 21.

In order to hold the tournament as safely as possible, all games were held behind closed doors in two stadiums near Salt Lake City, Utah. All teams were quarantined during the entirety of the tournament in the so-called "NWSL village" with all housing provided by Dell Loy Hansen, owner of Utah Royals FC. All players, officials, and essential staff members were tested for the coronavirus 48 hours before departure for Utah and remained subject to regular testing, temperature reading, and symptom review throughout the tournament.

== Squads ==
NWSL teams were required to submit finalized rosters to participate in the 2020 NWSL Challenge Cup on June 21. Roster sizes were required to be from a minimum of 22 players to maximum of 28 players (24 senior players + 4 supplemental players), and contain at least three goalkeepers. Only players listed on that final roster were permitted to participate in the tournament. International players already under contract by NWSL teams but not participating in the tournament did not count toward the roster limit. Furthermore, teams could sign a maximum of 4 players they had the rights to but were not yet under contract to short-term contracts lasting the duration of the tournament. Short-term loans from teams outside the NWSL were also permissible.

Player participation for the tournament was optional. The league allowed players to opt out without being in breach of contract, keeping all contracts, housing, insurance and other benefits guaranteed, regardless of participation in the tournament.

Squads were announced on June 23. OL Reign announced that United States international Megan Rapinoe had decided to opt out, while Julia Ashley and Leah Pruitt were unavailable due to long-term injuries. Two more U.S. internationals, Tobin Heath (Portland Thorns FC) and Christen Press (Utah Royals FC), announced their decisions to opt out. Sky Blue FC omitted U.S. internationals Carli Lloyd and Mallory Pugh, as well as Caprice Dydasco, all recovering from injuries. Merritt Mathias was unavailable due to a long-term injury for the North Carolina Courage, while Chicago Red Stars were missing Alyssa Mautz and Arin Wright due to a long-term injury and maternity leave respectively. All of the remaining teams — including the Orlando Pride, who withdrew from the tournament — named their full rosters.

== Preliminary round ==
=== Draw ===
The draw for the preliminary round was held on June 1, 2020, 12:00 ET, and streamed live on CBS Sports HQ. The nine NWSL teams were drawn randomly into nine slots, which determined each team's four-game schedule for the preliminary round. After the draw concluded, the NWSL released the full schedule of the preliminary round to be played at Zions Bank Stadium.

Slot	Team
1	Chicago Red Stars
2	Washington Spirit
3	Houston Dash
4	Utah Royals FC (H)
5	North Carolina Courage
6	Sky Blue FC
7	Portland Thorns FC
8	OL Reign
9	Orlando Pride (W)

The Orlando Pride withdrew from the tournament on June 22, 2020, after receiving multiple positive COVID-19 test results among the team's players and staff. One day later, the NWSL accordingly released a revised tournament schedule.

=== Standings ===
Pos	Team	Pld	W	D	L	GF	GA	GD	Pts
1	North Carolina Courage	4	4	0	0	7	1	+6	12
2	Washington Spirit	4	2	1	1	4	4	0	7
3	OL Reign	4	1	2	1	1	2	−1	5
4	Houston Dash	4	1	1	2	5	6	−1	4
5	Utah Royals FC (H)	4	1	1	2	4	5	−1	4
6	Chicago Red Stars	4	1	1	2	2	3	−1	4 (Note: Chicago Red Stars won the tiebreaker against Sky Blue FC on fewer yellow cards (1 to 4).)
7	Sky Blue FC	4	1	1	2	2	3	−1	4
8	Portland Thorns FC	4	0	3	1	2	3	−1	3

Source: NWSL
Rules for classification: Tiebreakers
(H) Host

==== Tiebreakers ====
The initial determining factor for a team's position in the standings is most points earned, with three points earned for a win, one point for a draw, and zero points for a loss. If two or more teams are equal on points after completion of the preliminary round, the following criteria shall be applied to determine team rankings:

1. Head-to-Head (only if two teams are tied and they've played each other).
2. Superior goal difference in all preliminary matches.
3. Greatest number of goals scored in all preliminary matches.
4. Lowest team conduct score relating to the number of yellow and red cards obtained, where only one of the below point totals shall be applied to a player in a single match:
  1. yellow card: 1 point;
  2. indirect red card (as a result of two yellow cards): 3 points;
  3. direct red card: 4 points;
  4. yellow card and direct red card: 5 points.
5. Drawing of lots by the NWSL.

=== Schedule ===
All game times are listed in MDT.

==== Matchday 1 ====
June 27, 2020
10:30

North Carolina Courage	2–1	Portland Thorns FC
Debinha 75'; L. Williams 90+4'	Report	Charley 80'

Zions Bank Stadium, Herriman, Utah
Referee: Lukasz Szpala

June 27, 2020
20:00

Chicago Red Stars	1–2	Washington Spirit
Gautrat 51'	Report	Lavelle 8'; Hatch 46'

Zions Bank Stadium, Herriman, Utah
Referee: Katja Koroleva

==== Matchday 2 ====
June 30, 2020
10:30

Houston Dash	3–3	Utah Royals FC
Daly 45+1', 47'; Groom 67'	Report	Matheson 35'; Boquete 82'; King 89'

Zions Bank Stadium, Herriman, Utah
Referee: Karen Abt

June 30, 2020
20:00

OL Reign	0–0	Sky Blue FC
	Report

Zions Bank Stadium, Herriman, Utah
Referee: Michael Radchuk

==== Matchday 3 ====
July 1, 2020
10:30

Portland Thorns FC	0–0	Chicago Red Stars
	Report

Zions Bank Stadium, Herriman, Utah
Referee: Danielle Chesky

July 1, 2020
20:00

Washington Spirit	0–2	North Carolina Courage
	Report	L. Williams 50', 61'

Zions Bank Stadium, Herriman, Utah
Referee: Lukasz Szpala

==== Matchday 4 ====
July 4, 2020
10:30

Utah Royals FC	1–0	Sky Blue FC
Rodriguez 41'	Report

Zions Bank Stadium, Herriman, Utah
Referee: Katja Koroleva

July 4, 2020
20:00

Houston Dash	2–0	OL Reign
Mewis 12'; Groom 54'	Report

Zions Bank Stadium, Herriman, Utah
Referee: Lukasz Szpala

==== Matchday 5 ====
July 5, 2020
10:30

North Carolina Courage	1–0	Chicago Red Stars
Erceg 81'	Report

Zions Bank Stadium, Herriman, Utah
Referee: Tori Penso

July 5, 2020
20:00

Portland Thorns FC	1–1	Washington Spirit
Horan 69'	Report	Staab 77'

Zions Bank Stadium, Herriman, Utah
Referee: Karen Abt

==== Matchday 6 ====
July 8, 2020
10:30

Utah Royals FC	0–1	OL Reign
	Report	Balcer 90+1'

Zions Bank Stadium, Herriman, Utah
Referee: Danielle Chesky

July 8, 2020
20:00

Sky Blue FC	2–0	Houston Dash
Monaghan 17'; Kawasumi 34'	Report

Zions Bank Stadium, Herriman, Utah
Referee: Tori Penso

==== Matchday 7 ====
July 12, 2020
10:30

Washington Spirit	1–0	Houston Dash
Feist 16'	Report

Zions Bank Stadium, Herriman, Utah
Referee: Katja Koroleva

July 12, 2020
20:00

Chicago Red Stars	1–0	Utah Royals FC
Short 85'	Report

Zions Bank Stadium, Herriman, Utah
Referee: Michael Radchuk

==== Matchday 8 ====
July 13, 2020
10:30

OL Reign	0–0	Portland Thorns FC
	Report

Zions Bank Stadium, Herriman, Utah
Referee: Karen Abt

July 13, 2020
20:00

Sky Blue FC	0–2	North Carolina Courage
	Report	Mewis 7'; Dunn 56'

Zions Bank Stadium, Herriman, Utah
Referee: Lukasz Szpala

== Knockout round ==
In the knockout round, if a game was level at the end of 90 minutes of normal playing time, there would be no extra time and the winners would be determined by a penalty shoot-out.

=== Bracket ===
Quarter-finals
July 17 – Zions Bank Stadium
Q1 North Carolina Courage	0
Q8 Portland Thorns FC	1
July 17 – Zions Bank Stadium
Q4 Houston Dash (p)	0 (3)
Q5 Utah Royals FC	0 (2)
July 18 – Zions Bank Stadium
Q3 OL Reign	0 (3)
Q6 Chicago Red Stars (p)	0 (4)
July 18 – Zions Bank Stadium
Q2 Washington Spirit	0 (3)
Q7 Sky Blue FC (p)	0 (4)

Semi-finals
July 22 – Rio Tinto Stadium
Portland Thorns FC	0
Houston Dash	1
July 22 – Rio Tinto Stadium
Chicago Red Stars	3
Sky Blue FC	2

Championship
July 26 – Rio Tinto Stadium
Houston Dash	2
Chicago Red Stars	0

All game times are listed in MDT.

=== Quarter-finals ===
July 17, 2020
10:30

North Carolina Courage	0–1	Portland Thorns FC
	Report	Weaver 68'

Zions Bank Stadium
Herriman, Utah

July 17, 2020
20:00

Houston Dash	0–0	Utah Royals FC
	Report
Penalties
Schmidt (penalty scored); Nairn (penalty scored); Daly (penalty scored); Visalli (penalty missed)	3–2	(penalty missed) Rodriguez; (penalty scored) LaBonta; (penalty missed) Corsie; (penalty scored) King; (penalty missed) Boquete

Zions Bank Stadium
Herriman, Utah

July 18, 2020
10:30

Washington Spirit	0–0	Sky Blue FC
	Report
Penalties
Lavelle (penalty scored); Hatch (penalty scored); Staab (penalty missed); Thomas (penalty scored); Feist (penalty missed)	3–4	(penalty scored) Woldmoe; (penalty scored) Kawasumi; (penalty missed) Richardson; (penalty scored) Zerboni; (penalty scored) Eddy

Zions Bank Stadium
Herriman, Utah

July 18, 2020
20:00

OL Reign	0–0	Chicago Red Stars
	Report
Penalties
Cruz (penalty missed); Momiki (penalty scored); Jenkins (penalty scored); Balcer (penalty scored); Barnes (penalty missed)	3–4	(penalty scored) Ertz; (penalty scored) DiBernardo; (penalty scored) Watt; (penalty scored) Hill

Zions Bank Stadium
Herriman, Utah

=== Semi-finals ===
July 22, 2020
10:30

Houston Dash	1–0	Portland Thorns FC
Daly 69'	Report

Rio Tinto Stadium
Sandy, Utah

July 22, 2020
20:00

Chicago Red Stars	3–2	Sky Blue FC
St. Georges 8'; Hill 11'; McCaskill 60'	Report	Viens 72'; Ertz 77' (o.g.)

Rio Tinto Stadium
Sandy, Utah

=== Championship ===
July 26, 2020
12:30 ET

Houston Dash	2–0	Chicago Red Stars
Schmidt 5' (pen.); Groom 90+1'	Report

Rio Tinto Stadium, Sandy, Utah
Attendance: 0 (Behind closed doors)
Referee: Katja Koroleva

== Statistics ==
=== Goalscorers ===
There were 36 goals scored in 23 matches, for an average of 1.57 goals per match.

3 goals

- Rachel Daly, HOU
- Shea Groom, HOU
- Lynn Williams, NC

1 goal

- Morgan Gautrat, CHI
- Rachel Hill, CHI
- Savannah McCaskill, CHI
- Casey Short, CHI
- Bianca St. Georges, CHI
- Kristie Mewis, HOU
- Sophie Schmidt, HOU
- Debinha, NC
- Crystal Dunn, NC
- Abby Erceg, NC
- Sam Mewis, NC
- Nahomi Kawasumi, NJ
- Paige Monaghan, NJ
- Evelyne Viens, NJ
- Simone Charley, POR
- Lindsey Horan, POR
- Morgan Weaver, POR
- Bethany Balcer, RGN
- Verónica Boquete, UTA
- Tziarra King, UTA
- Diana Matheson, UTA
- Amy Rodriguez, UTA
- Bayley Feist, WAS
- Ashley Hatch, WAS
- Rose Lavelle, WAS
- Sam Staab, WAS

1 own goal

- Julie Ertz, CHI (against NJ)

Source: NWSL

=== Assists ===
2 assists

- Rachel Daly, HOU
- Verónica Boquete, UTA

1 assist

- Katie Johnson, CHI
- Savannah McCaskill, CHI
- Bianca St. Georges, CHI
- Shea Groom, HOU
- Veronica Latsko, HOU
- Kristie Mewis, HOU
- Katie Stengel, HOU
- Jaelene Daniels, NC
- Debinha, NC
- Hailie Mace, NC
- Sam Mewis, NC
- Lynn Williams, NC
- Ifeoma Onumonu, NJ
- McCall Zerboni, NJ
- Meghan Klingenberg, POR
- Raquel Rodríguez, POR
- Nicole Momiki, RGN
- Amy Rodriguez, UTA
- Ashley Hatch, WAS
- Ashley Sanchez, WAS

Source: NWSL

=== Discipline ===
A player would be automatically suspended for the next match for the following offences:

- Receiving a red card (red card suspensions may be extended for serious offences);
- Receiving two yellow cards in two matches; yellow cards expire after the completion of the quarter-finals;
- Direct red card suspensions are carried forward to future NWSL regular season matches, but indirect red card suspensions will not be carried forward to any future matches.

No suspensions were served during the tournament.

=== Awards ===
The following awards were given at the conclusion of the tournament: The MVP (most outstanding player as voted by the media and sponsored by Budweiser), Golden Boot (top scorer), Golden Glove (best goalkeeper as voted by the media and sponsored by Verizon), NWSL Future Legend (the top-performing player in their first season with the NWSL), and Best XI (the best 11-players as voted by the players, media, fans, and GMs/coaches, and presented by Google).

MVP	Golden Boot	Golden Glove	Future Legend
Rachel Daly, HOU (3 G, 2 A)		Kailen Sheridan, NJ (21 SV, 3 SO, 1.00 GAA)	Ashley Sanchez, WAS (1 A, 4 SOG)

==== Best XI ====
Goalkeeper	Defenders	Midfielders	Forwards
Britt Eckerstrom, POR	Julie Ertz, CHI; Abby Erceg, NC; Casey Short, CHI; Jaelene Daniels, NC	Rachel Daly, HOU; Shea Groom, HOU; Rose Lavelle, WAS	Debinha, NC; Lynn Williams, NC; Lindsey Horan, POR

==== Fan-voted awards ====
- Play of the Tournament: Lindsey Horan, POR
- Save of the Tournament: Britt Eckerstrom, POR

== Broadcasting ==
In accordance with the broadcast deals signed by the NWSL at the start of the 2020 season, both the tournament opener and final aired on CBS. All other games were broadcast live on the CBS All Access subscription service in the U.S. and Canada and re-aired on CBS Sports Network. International fans were able to stream the full tournament on Twitch.
