= Christen Press =

American soccer player (born 1988)

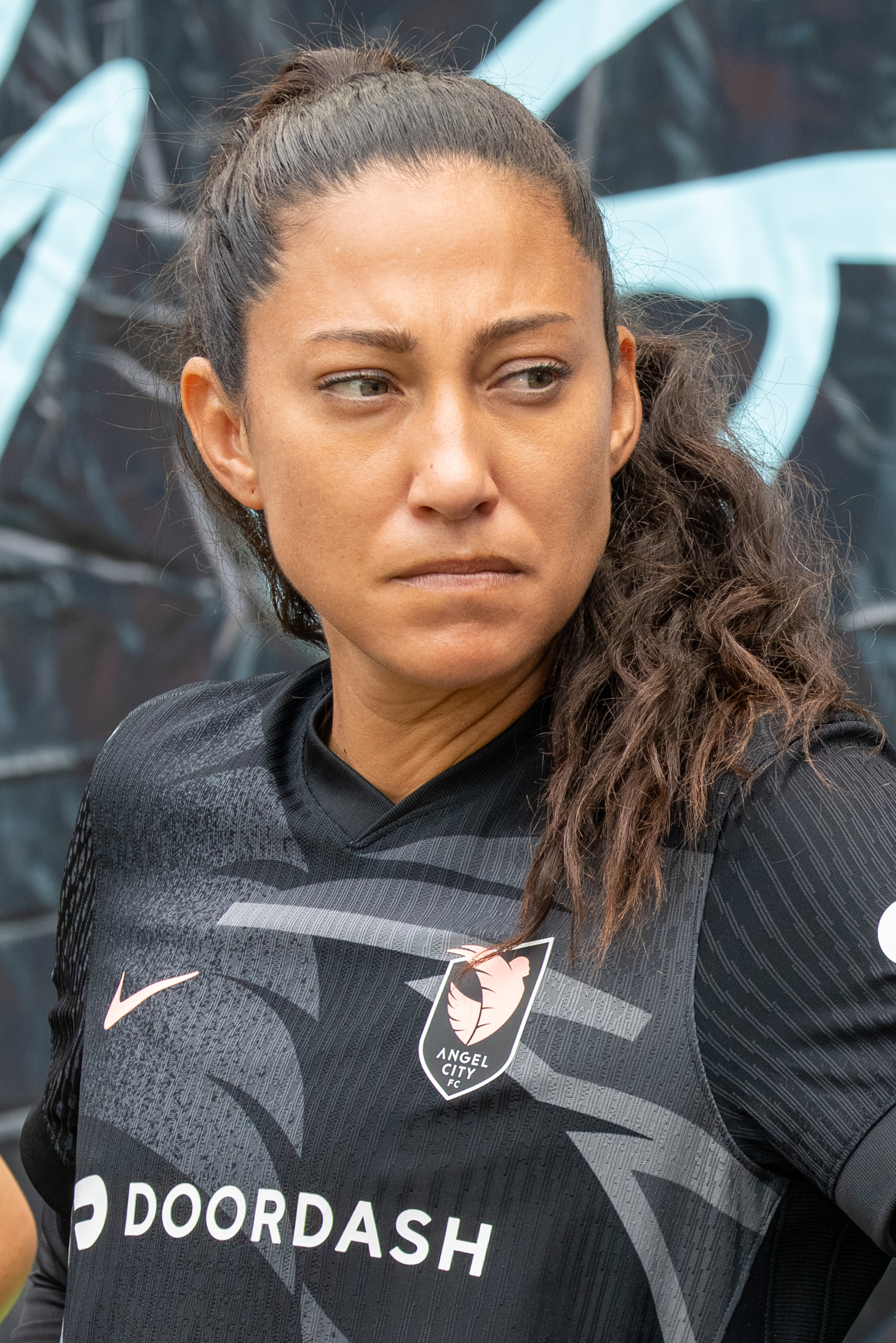
- Press with Angel City in 2025

Personal information
- Full name: Christen Annemarie Press
- Date of birth: December 29, 1988 (age 37)
- Place of birth: Los Angeles, California, United States
- Height: 5 ft 7 in (1.70 m)
- Position: Forward

Youth career
- Slammers FC
- 2003–2007: Chadwick Dolphins

College career
Years	Team	Apps	(Gls)
2007–2010	Stanford Cardinal	98	(71)

Senior career*
Years	Team	Apps	(Gls)
2009–2010	Pali Blues	10	(4)
2011	magicJack	17	(8)
2012	Kopparbergs/Göteborg FC	21	(17)
2013–2014	Tyresö FF	26	(25)
2014–2017	Chicago Red Stars	60	(35)
2018	Kopparbergs/Göteborg FC	8	(4)
2018–2020	Utah Royals	25	(10)
2020–2021	Manchester United	14	(4)
2022–2025	Angel City	39	(4)
Total		220	(111)

International career
2008	United States U20	0	(0)
2009–2010	United States U23	6	(4)
2013–2021	United States	155	(64)
Medal record
Representing United States
FIFA Women's World Cup
Winner	2015 Canada
Winner	2019 France
CONCACAF W Championship
Winner	2014 United States
Winner	2018 United States
Olympic Games
Bronze medal – third place	2020 Tokyo
- * Club domestic league appearances and goals as of 21:47, November 11, 2025 (UTC)

Christen Annemarie Press (born December 29, 1988) is an American former professional soccer player, entrepreneur, and sports journalist. She last played for Angel City FC of the National Women's Soccer League (NWSL) and the United States national team. She first appeared for the United States national team during an international friendly against Scotland on February 9, 2013. She made 155 appearances for her country and ranks ninth all-time with 64 goals scored.

Press was the recipient of the Hermann Trophy in 2010 and holds the all-time scoring record at Stanford Cardinal. Following her collegiate career, Press was selected fourth overall by the Washington Freedom in the 2011 WPS Draft, where she was named WPS Rookie of the Year. She was the Damallsvenskan's top scorer in 2013 with 23 goals scored for Tyresö FF and became the first American to earn the Golden Boot award in the history of the Swedish League.

Press has played for the Chicago Red Stars and Utah Royals in the National Women's Soccer League (NWSL), Kopparbergs/Göteborg FC and Tyresö FF in the Swedish Damallsvenskan, magicJack in Women's Professional Soccer (WPS) and Manchester United of the English FA Women's Super League. She helped the United States win their titles at the 2015 and 2019 FIFA Women's World Cup. In 2019, she co-founded a gender-neutral lifestyle brand, RE—INC, with fellow athletes Megan Rapinoe, Tobin Heath, and Meghan Klingenberg. Press co-hosts the podcast, The RE—CAP Show, with Tobin Heath.

Press is a Global Ambassador and board member of the adolescent health organization Grassroot Soccer.

== Early life ==
Born in Los Angeles to Cody and Stacy Press, Christen was raised in the suburb of Palos Verdes Estates with her two sisters, Channing and Tyler. Both of her parents played different sports: Cody was an American football player at Dartmouth and Stacy was a tennis player. She began playing soccer at age five and later attended Chadwick School for high school.

As a two-year team captain and four-year starter of her high school's soccer team, Press led Chadwick to two Southern Section Division IV titles. She also lettered in track and tennis. In 2006, she was named NSCAA High School All-American and Parade Magazine All-American. During her high school career, she scored 128 goals, including 38 her junior year alone (a school record). She was named Southern Section Division IV Offensive Player of the Year twice and was a four-time Prep League Offensive MVP.

Press played club soccer for Slammers FC of Newport Beach, California, and won the Golden Boot for most goals scored in the US Youth Soccer Association's national championship tournament.

=== Stanford Cardinal (2007–2010) ===
Press is the all-time leading scorer for the Stanford Cardinal women's soccer team with 71 goals. While playing for the Cardinal, she broke school records for career points (Note: Points: (2 * goals) + (assists).) (183), assists (41), and shots (500); as well as single-season records for goals (26), shots (180), and game-winning goals (10). She was Stanford's second Hermann Trophy winner and a two-time runner-up at the NCAA Women's College Cup.

As a freshman, Press started 18 games for Stanford. She led the team in assists (6) and ranked second in goals (8), points (22) and shots (60). One of her biggest highlights of the year came in the first round of the NCAA College Cup when she scored the fastest goal in team history in the 37th second of the match. She scored twice and also assisted on another goal in the team's 7–0 victory. Press was named Pac-10 Freshman of the Year and earned first-team Freshman All-American honors.

During her sophomore year, Press was one of only five players in the squad to start every game of the season. She scored 16 goals and had 11 assists, while her total of 43 points ranked second in school history. In the College Cup quarterfinal against the Portland Pilots, Press scored the lone goal of the match in the 86th minute to send the Cardinal to the Final Four. She was the only player from the Cardinal squad to be named to the NCAA College Cup All-Tournament Team.

During her third season with the Cardinal, Press set new program records for assists (16) and shots (143). Seven of her 21 goals during the 2009 season were game-winning goals. Her 58 points raised the bar that she set during the previous season for the second-highest point total in a single season and ranked third in the nation. Press also broke her previous record for fastest goal scored in Stanford history after scoring 23 seconds into a match against BYU. In the College Cup, she scored the golden goal and had an assist in the Cardinal's 2–1 overtime win against the UCLA Bruins to send them into their first-ever cup final. They went on to lose the final to the North Carolina Tar Heels, after Press's apparent game-tying goal in the 89th minute was ruled offside. At the end of the season, Press was named to the All-Pac-10 first team and was a semi-finalist for the Hermann Trophy.

In her senior year, Press was the recipient of the 2010 Hermann Trophy for being the nation's top college soccer player. This marked the second consecutive win for a Stanford player following Kelley O'Hara in 2009. Press led the nation in both goals and points, while the club obtained a 23–1–2 record overall. Their only loss in 2010 came in the last match of the season in the College Cup final, which was Stanford's second consecutive runner-up finish. Press was also named Soccer America Player of the Year, Pac-10 Player of the Year, and earned All-Pac-10 first team and National Soccer Coaches Association of America (NSCAA) first-team All-American honors. She displayed academic proficiency as well, receiving Academic All-America honors and winning the Pac-10's Scholar-Athlete of the Year for soccer.

==== Stanford statistics ====
Year	Apps	Starts	Gls	Asts
2007	21	18	8	6
2008	25	25	16	11
2009	26	26	21	16
2010	26	26	26	8
Totals	98	95	71	41

== Club career ==
=== magicJack (2011) ===
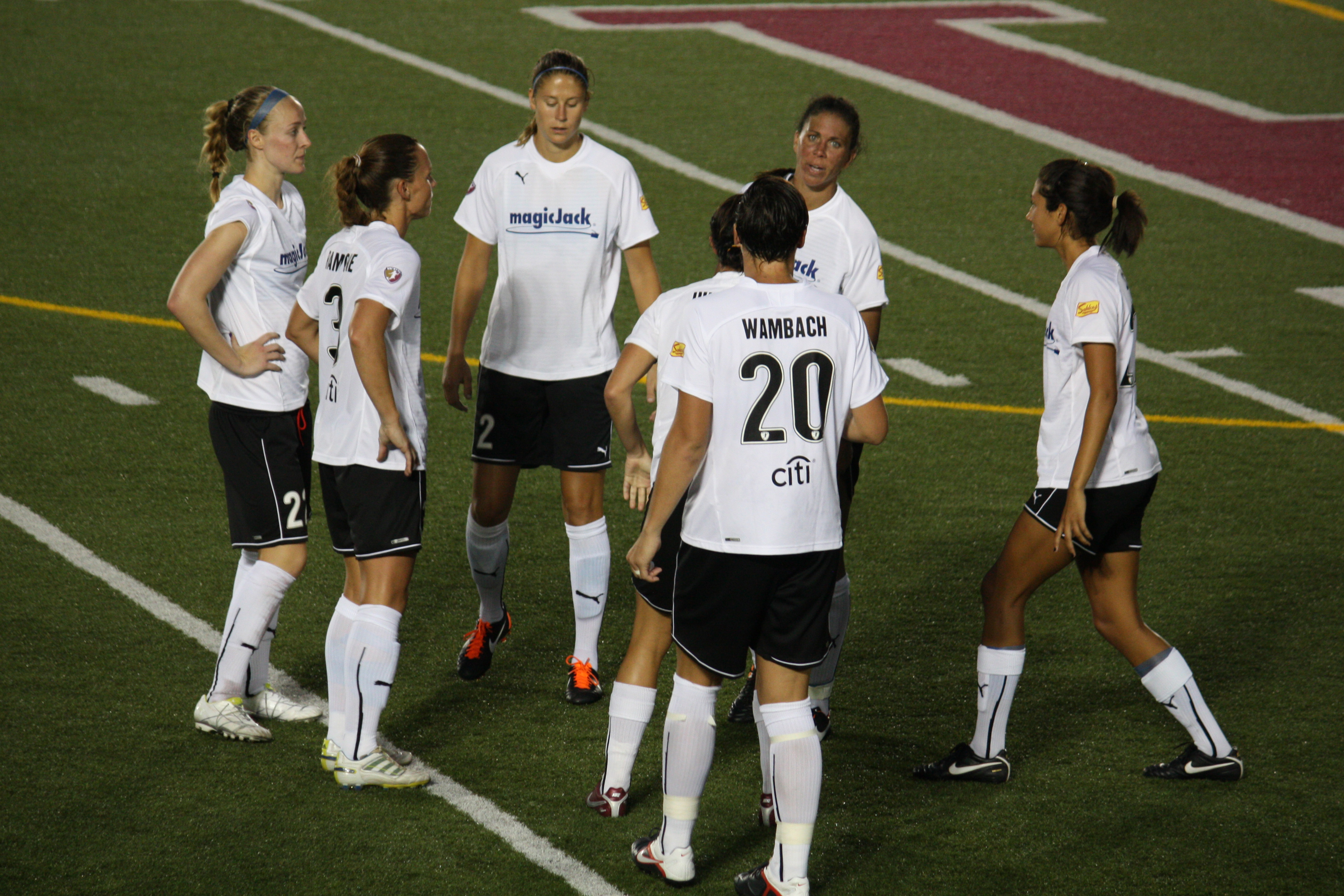
Press (far right) with her magicJack teammates during a match against the Boston Breakers on August 6, 2011. From left to right: Sauerbrunn, Rampone, Dalmy, Huffman, Wambach, Boxx, Press

Press was drafted to the Washington Freedom as the fourth overall pick in the 2011 WPS Draft. Under new ownership, the team moved to Florida and was renamed magicJack. She scored her first goal in the 64th minute of magicJack's 2–0 victory over the Atlanta Beat in May. Of the goal, Press said, "It was so good to finish. Being a forward, we go into every game thinking our job is to score, so it's nice to finally get that accomplished." During a 4–0 win against the Boston Breakers in July, Press scored her first hat trick in a professional match. After losing in the semifinal of the playoffs, she was awarded the U.S. Soccer Federation's Rookie of the Year award in part for being the first-ever rookie to have a hat trick. Press finished the season having started in 16 of the 19 games in which she appeared for magicJack. Her eight goals ranked third in the league. During the offseason, Press signed with the Atlanta Beat; however, the league suspended operations before the season began.

=== Kopparbergs/Göteborg FC (2012) ===
After Women's Professional Soccer folded in early 2012, Press signed a new professional contract with Kopparbergs/Göteborg FC in the Damallsvenskan, the top division league in Sweden. Her first game with Göteborg was a 2011–12 UEFA Women's Champions League quarterfinal match against Arsenal that ended in a 3–1 loss.

During her regular season debut with Göteborg on April 10 against Djurgården, she scored two goals (a brace), with her first goal coming in the fifth minute of the match. Later in the month, she scored another brace, this time with the goals scored five minutes apart in the team's 6–0 victory over KIF Örebro. In August, Press recorded her third brace, this time scoring two minutes apart as Göteborg defeated Umeå 5–0. Press ended the year as the second-highest scorer in the Damallsvenskan with 17 league goals, behind only Anja Mittag, and scored a total of 25 in all competitions.

During the quarterfinals of the Swedish Cup, Press scored two goals in a 3–0 victory over Kristianstad. In the semifinals, her thirteenth-minute goal helped Göteborg defeat LdB Malmö 2–1 and progress to the championship final. Göteborg won the championship over Tyresö FF by a score of 2–1 after extra time, with Press involved in both goals. She scored in the ninth minute of the game and then drew a penalty in the added time, which Marlene Sjöberg converted to secure the cup.

=== Tyresö FF (2013–2014) ===
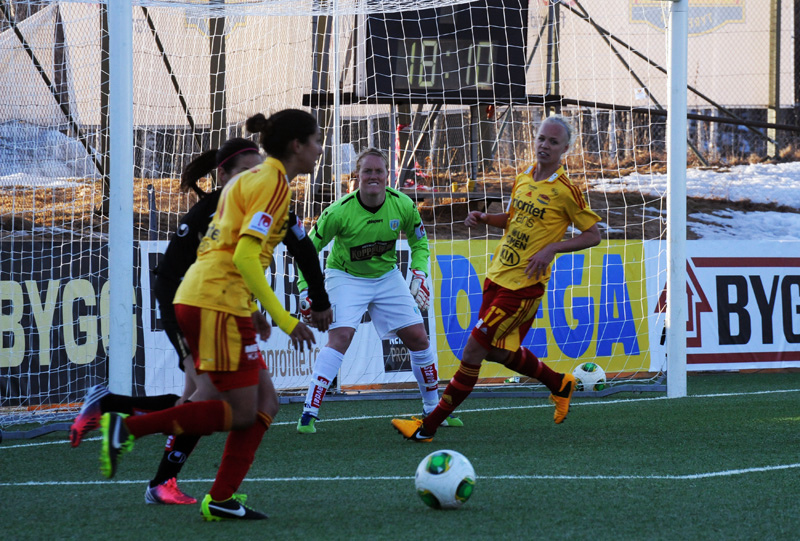
Press playing for Tyresö FF at the Svenska Supercupen, 2013

In early 2013, Press signed with Damallsvenskan champions, Tyresö FF, in Stockholm. For the second consecutive season, she scored a goal in her regular season debut. Press scored four goals in a 10–2 win over Sunnanå SK. During the team's next match, she scored two goals helping the team defeat Jitex BK 7–0. On June 9, 2013, she scored a hat trick during the squad's 5–1 win over Kristianstads DFF. After following up with a pair of goals scored in each of Tyresö's next two matches, Press scored her second and third hat tricks of the season, the second in a 5–0 win over Jitex BK on August 24, and the following in an eventual 8–0 win against Sunnanå IF. During the team's last match of the regular season, Press scored twice against her former team, Göteborg FC, helping Tyresö win 4–1.

Press finished the season as the top scorer in the league with 23 goals, becoming the first American to do so in the history of the Damallsvenskan. Tyresö finished second during the regular season with a 14–6–2 record and thus qualified for the 2014–15 UEFA Women's Champions League. In October, Press scored Tyresö's only two goals during the 2013–14 UEFA Women's Champions League's Round of 32 match, securing a 2–1 aggregate win over French side Paris Saint-Germain Féminines, and sending her team to the Round of 16. In 2013, she scored three times in the Svenska Cupen and nine times in the 2013–14 UEFA Women's Champions League competitions, for a total goal tally of 37. Her nine goals scored in the Champions League helped lift the team to the 2014 UEFA Women's Champions League Final where they lost 4–3 to VfL Wolfsburg.

=== Chicago Red Stars (2014–2017) ===
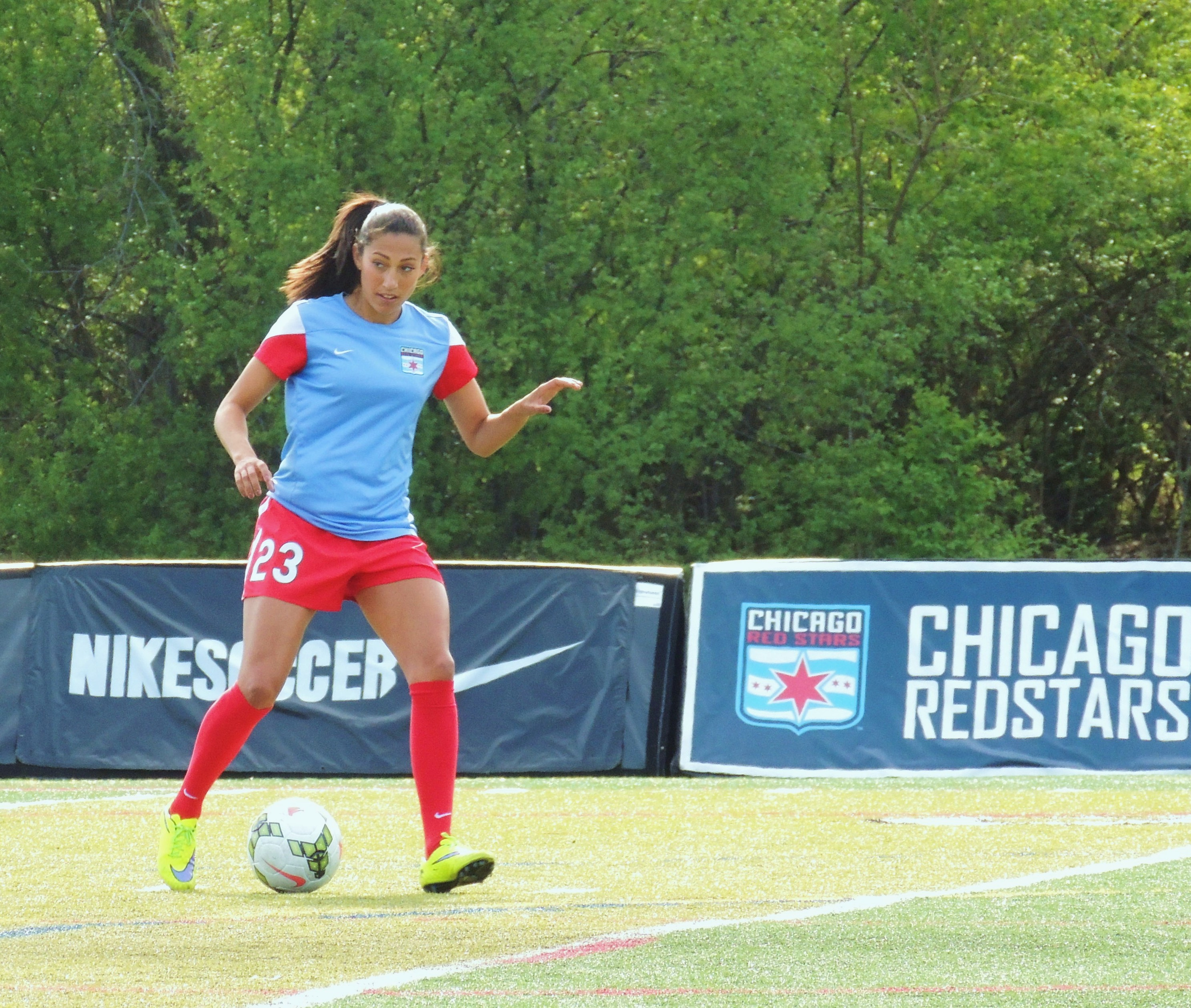
Christen Press warming up as a Red Star on May 2, 2015

In January 2014, the Chicago Red Stars announced that Press would be joining their roster for the 2014 season following the conclusion of her time with Tyresö in the 2013–14 Champions League. After Press joined the team in late May (two months into the 2014 NWSL season), she scored a team-high of six goals while playing in only 12 matches and was awarded the team's Golden Boot. During a match on July 4 against reigning champions Portland Thorns FC at Providence Park, she scored two goals in the last fifteen minutes to equalize the score, after being down 2–0 at halftime. On August 16, she scored another brace with goals in the 17th and 60th minutes helping Chicago draw 3–3 against Western New York Flash. Chicago finished fifth during the regular season with a 9–7–8 record. Press was named to the league's second XI team by players, coaches, and media.

Press returned to the Chicago Red Stars for the 2015 season. During the team's first home match against Seattle Reign FC, she scored a brace and assisted a goal scored by Jen Hoy, resulting in a 3–2 win. She was subsequently named the league's NWSL Player of the Week for week two of the season. On April 25, Press scored two early goals in a drawn match against Portland. At the end of April, having recorded four goals and one assist, Press was the league's goal leader and was named NWSL Player of the Month. Press missed the next eight games due to her participation in the 2015 FIFA Women's World Cup. After returning, she scored four goals in a three-game span, including a brace in the Red Stars' 2–2 draw with FC Kansas City on August 1.

During the 2016 season, Press was named captain and tallied eight goals in 14 games. She scored a goal in the NWSL Playoffs, though the Red Stars were eliminated after a 2–1 loss to the Washington Spirit in extra time.

Press captained the team for a second season in 2017. She was the top scorer on the team with 11 goals and the fourth highest scorer in the league. Chicago finished in fourth place during the regular season with an 11–7–6 record, securing a berth to the playoffs. The team was defeated by regular season winners North Carolina Courage 1–0 during the semi-finals. Press was named to the NWSL Best XI at the end of the season.

On January 18, 2018, Press was traded to the Houston Dash as part a three-team trade which also included Carli Lloyd and Samantha Kerr. On March 10, the Dash were informed that Press would not be joining the club and had multiple offers in Sweden.

=== Kopparbergs/Göteborg FC (2018) ===
In March 2018, Press signed a three-month contract with her former club Kopparbergs/Göteborg FC, though the Dash still held her NWSL rights. After scoring four goals in three games, Press was named Damallsvenskan Player of the Month for April. In May, she scored a brace in the team's 3–1 win against IF Limhamn Bunkeflo. On June 19, the team announced an agreement with NWSL expansion club, Utah Royals FC, to end her contract early so she could join the Royals for the remainder of the 2018 season.

=== Utah Royals FC (2018–2020) ===
On June 18, Utah Royals FC announced they had acquired the rights to Press in a trade that sent Brooke Elby and six draft picks to the Chicago Red Stars. She made her debut on June 27 in a 0–0 draw against the Seattle Reign. Press appeared in 11 games during the Royals' 2018 season, and scored 2 goals. The Royals finished in fifth place during their inaugural season, missing a berth to the NWSL Playoffs by two points.

Press began the 2019 NWSL season assisting Lo'eau LaBonta's goal in a 1–0 over the Washington Spirit in Utah's season opener. The following week, Press scored the only goal in 1–0 Royals victory over the Orlando Pride. Press was named to the NWSL Team of the Month for April. She recorded a goal or assist in her first five games of the season but, due to her participation in the 2019 Women's World Cup and subsequent Victory Tour, missed 11 Utah games during the season. Press was named NWSL Player of the Week for Week 17 and later named NWSL Player of the Month for August, her second player of the month award. Press finished second on the team in scoring with 8 goals and was named to the end of season NWSL Best XI, her fourth time being named to the Best XI.

With the 2020 season disrupted by the COVID-19 pandemic, Press elected not to participate in the 2020 NWSL Challenge Cup.

On November 12, 2020, having left Press unprotected, Utah lost her NWSL rights to Racing Louisville FC during the 2020 NWSL Expansion Draft.

=== Manchester United (2020–2021) ===
On September 9, 2020, Manchester United announced they had signed Press and her national team teammate Tobin Heath to one-year contracts. She made her debut on October 4 as a 77th-minute substitute in a 3–0 victory over Brighton & Hove Albion. She scored her first goal for the club on October 18 as part of a 4–2 WSL victory away to West Ham United. On January 31, 2021, Press scored her second goal for the club in a 2–0 away victory against Everton. She scored during a 2–0 victory against West Ham United on March 27, 2021, the team's first match played at Old Trafford. On June 24, the club announced Press would leave upon the expiry of her contract at the end of the month.

=== Angel City FC (2021–2025) ===
On August 23, 2021, Racing Louisville FC traded the NWSL playing rights of Press to Angel City FC having acquired them in the 2020 NWSL Expansion Draft. In return they received Angel City's first-round pick in the 2022 NWSL Draft, $75,000 in allocation money and roster protection from Angel City in the 2021 NWSL Expansion Draft. She signed a two-year contract with an optional third year, reportedly worth a total of $700,000, making Press one of the highest-paid players in NWSL history.

Press suffered an ACL injury in June 2022 in a NWSL match against Racing Louisville which required four surgeries to repair. She missed the entire 2023 season and returned to training with the Angel City senior team on June 11, 2024, 2 years to the day since she originally tore her ACL. Press made her return to the field 781 days after her injury on August 1, 2024, in a NWSL x Liga MX Femenil Summer Cup group stage match against the San Diego Wave. The match ended in a scoreless draw, and Press converted her penalty kick in the ensuing shootout, which Angel City won. On October 12, 2024, Press came on as a second-half substitute against the North Carolina Courage and scored her first regular season goal for Angel City since she tore her ACL, a match that ultimately ended in a draw. This match also marked the 100th appearance in the NWSL regular season for Press.

On January 17, 2025, Press and Angel City agreed to a new one-year contract through the 2025 NWSL season.

Press announced her retirement from playing professionally on October 15, 2025. Reflecting on Press' significance to the club, Angel City CEO Julie Uhrman said “Christen retires as one of the most decorated and respected forwards in U.S. soccer history, a pioneer whose legacy is woven into the very fabric of our club. As Angel City’s first signing, Christen’s contributions to the club have been unparalleled."

== International career ==
=== 2012 ===
As a member of the United States women's national soccer team player pool, Press was named to the squad for the 2012 Summer Olympics in London, though she attended as an alternate, and did not make the final roster.

=== 2013 ===
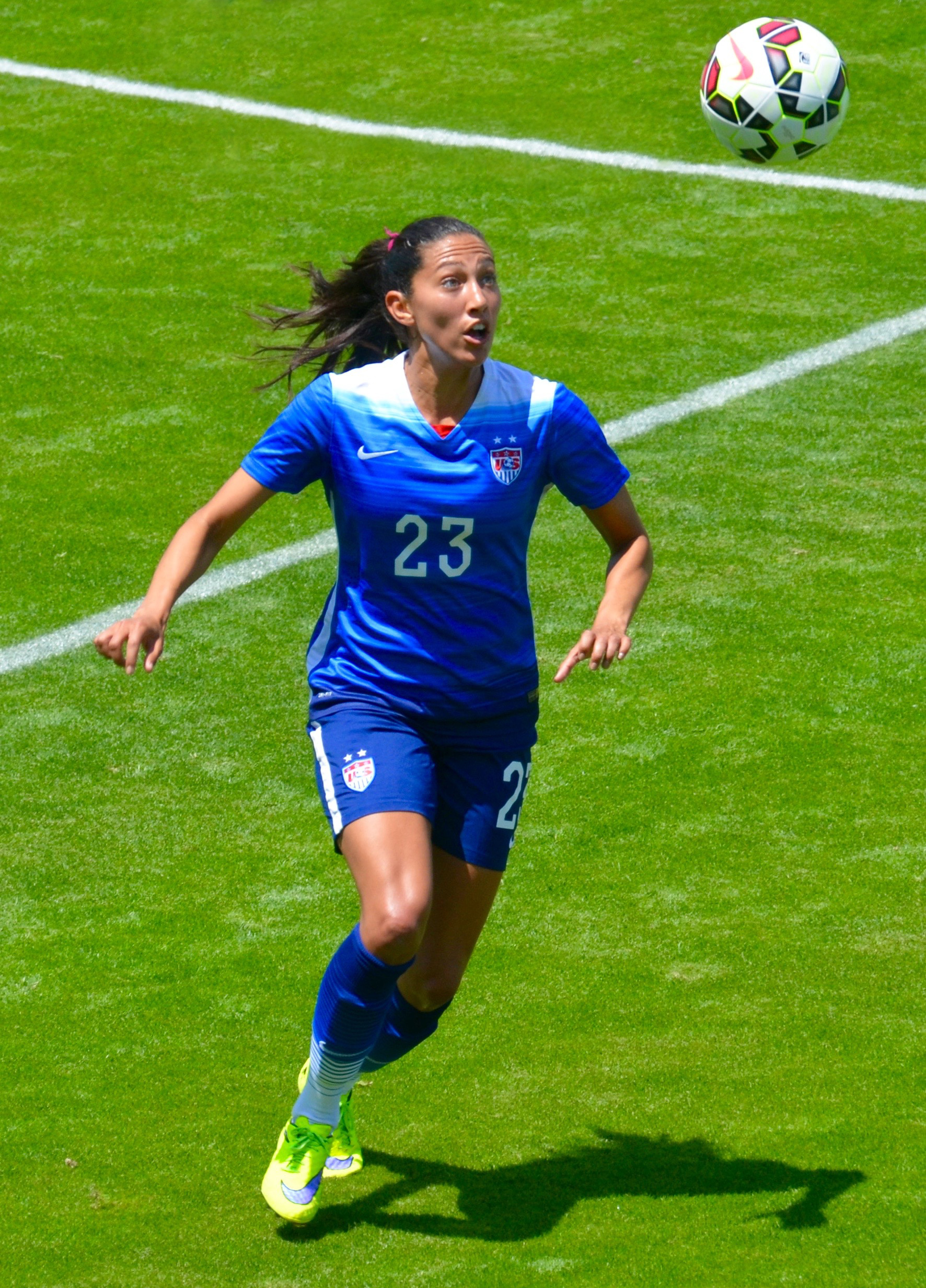
Press playing for the United States at Avaya Stadium, May 2015

She earned her first cap for the national team on February 9 in a friendly against Scotland. After scoring the first two goals of the match playing as a right midfielder, she provided the assist on the United States' third goal. Press is only the third woman to score two goals on her first match for the United States national team following Cindy Parlow Cone in 1996 and Sherrill Kester in 2000. The United States defeated Scotland 4–1 and Press was named Budweiser Woman of the Match. Four days later, she scored another goal during her second cap, helping the United States defeat Scotland 2–0. No other American woman has scored three goals in her first two games.

Press' third cap for the national team occurred at the 2013 Algarve Cup during the team's first group stage match against Iceland on March 6, 2013. Press subbed in during the 64th minute for Carli Lloyd and the U.S. defeated Iceland 3–0. During the team's next group stage match on March 8, 2013, Press scored the fourth goal in a commanding 5–0 win over China. With the goal against China, Press became the fifth women's national team player to score at least four goals in her first four matches. She earned two additional caps at the Algarve during the knockout stage match against Sweden led by former United States coach, Pia Sundhage, and started in the final against Germany. The United States took first at the 2013 Algarve Cup with a 2–0 win over Germany. Press finished her first year with the senior national team with eight goals in 12 matches.

=== 2014: CONCACAF Women's Championship ===
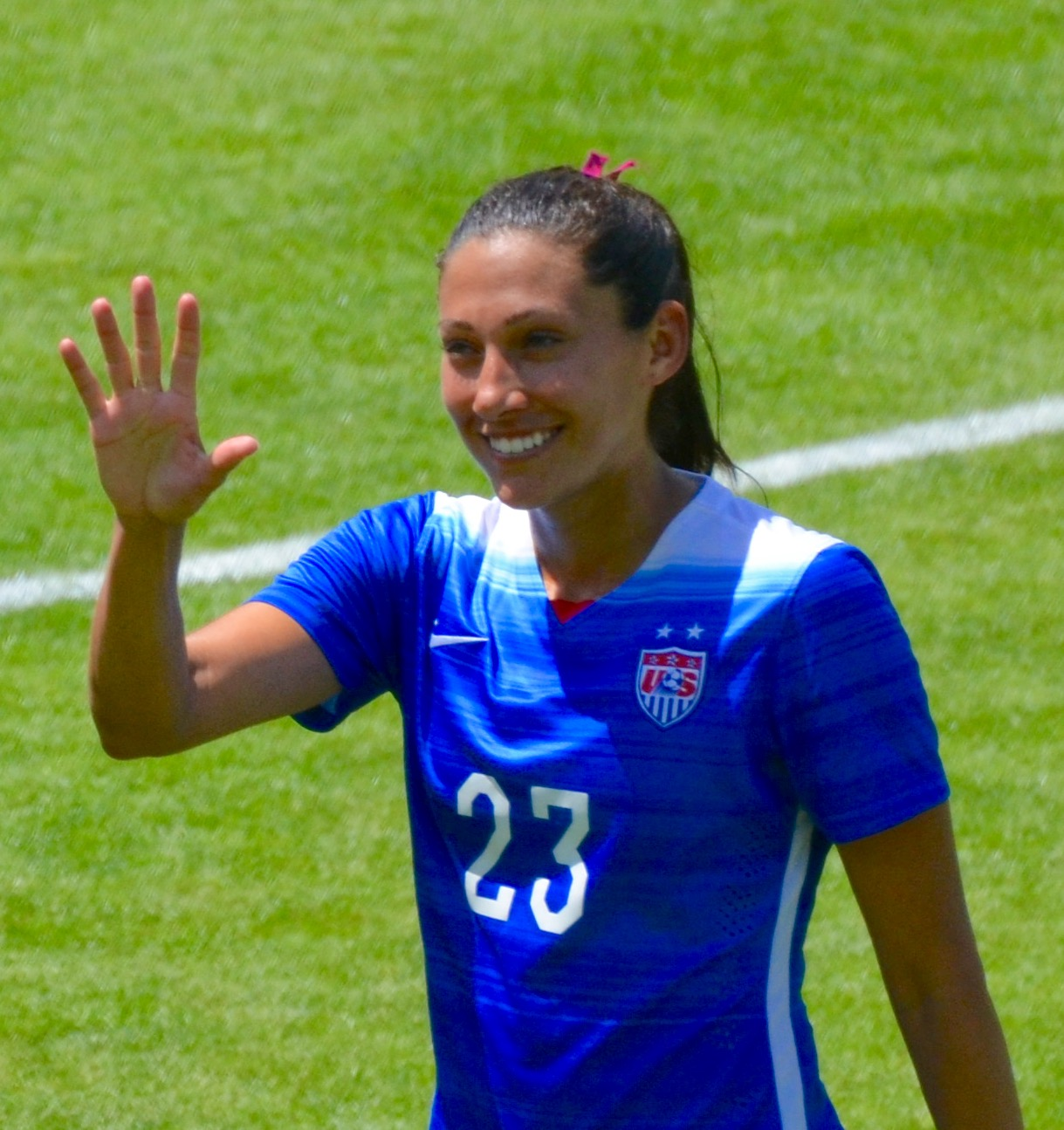
Press in 2015

Press scored a career-high 11 goals (and ranked third-best on the national team) in 2014. During a group stage match against Argentina at the 2014 International Tournament of Brasília, she scored four goals helping the United States win 7–0, and qualify for the championship game. Earlier in the year, she scored a goal against Russia in a friendly on February 8, 2014, and again on February 13, 2014. She was selected by national team head coach Tom Sermanni to play at the 2014 Algarve Cup. In October, Press featured in the 2014 CONCACAF Women's Championship where the team won the tournament.

=== 2015: FIFA Women's World Cup ===
Press was named to the national team squad for the 2015 FIFA Women's World Cup in Canada. On June 8, she made her first tournament start against Australia and scored her first World Cup goal in the 61st minute. She played in four of the team's seven games, starting two, helping the United States progress to the 2015 FIFA Women's World Cup Final. The United States won the tournament after defeating Japan 5–2.

=== 2016: Summer Olympics ===
Press was selected as one of the 18 members of the Summer Olympics team. After the team advanced to the knockout stages, they lost in the quarter-finals to Sweden. After a 1–1 draw, they lost 4–3 on a penalty shootout with Press missing the team's decisive final kick. Supporters on social media started the #DogsforChristen hashtag to cheer her up and it became a trending worldwide topic on Twitter. Press competed in all four of the team's matches and was a starting forward in the 2–2 draw against Colombia.

Press was one of two United States players to appear in all 25 games in 2016. She finished the year with 12 goals, which was the third straight year she recorded double-figure goals and was her best goal-scoring record on the team. She became the fifth player in team history to score double-figure goals for three consecutive years, joining Mia Hamm, Abby Wambach, Tiffeny Milbrett, and Carli Lloyd in the team record books.

=== 2017 ===
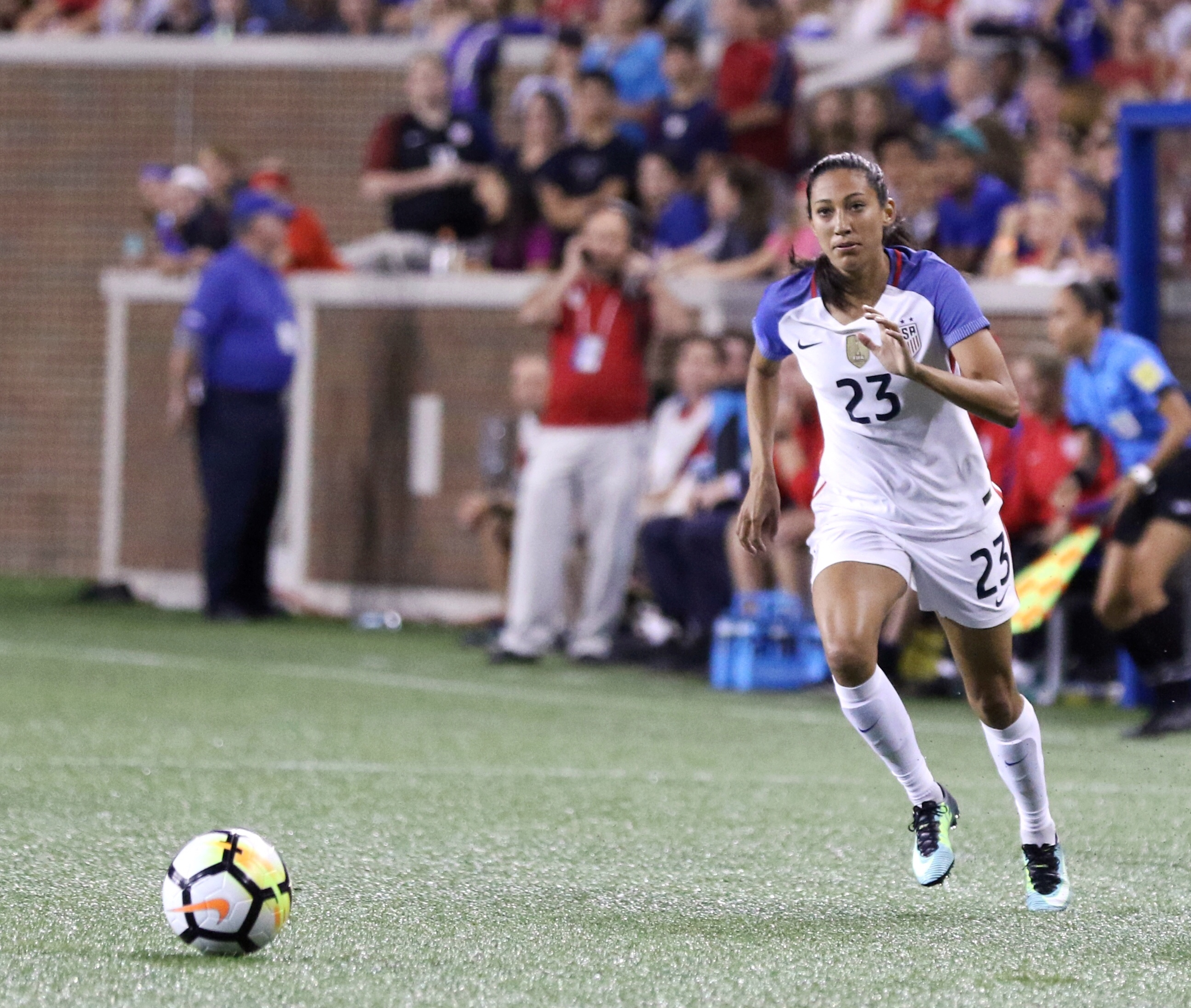
Press with the national team in 2017.

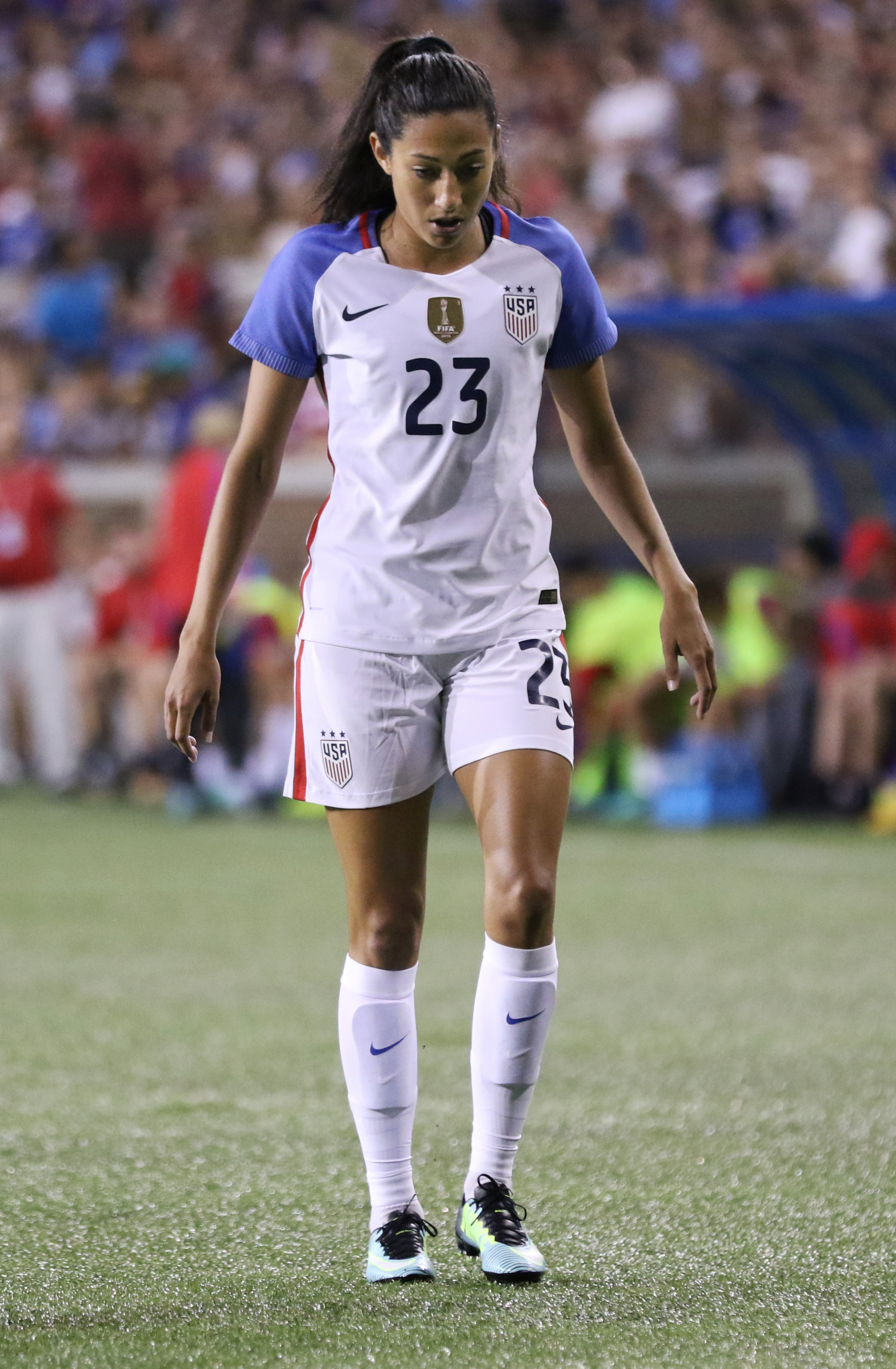
Press playing for the national team in 2017.

In 2017 Press once again appeared in every game for the United States and was one of only three players to do so. She scored the only goal in a 1–0 win over Norway in a June friendly. At the 2017 Tournament of Nations held in three different venues in California and Washington, Press scored a goal in the 80th minute against Brazil to lift the United States score deficit to 3–2. Five minutes later, she provided the assist to Megan Rapinoe's equalizer. With an additional goal from Julie Ertz, the team turned the game around for a 4–3 win. She finished 2017 with three goals and three assists.

=== 2018: CONCACAF Women's Championship ===
Press was named to the roster for the 2018 SheBelieves Cup in February. The United States won the tournament for the second time.

After she was traded against her wishes to the Houston Dash, Press declined to join the team and was reportedly considering multiple offers from Swedish clubs. She was subsequently left off the U.S. roster for a set of friendlies against Mexico in April 2018, with head coach Jill Ellis stating: "We've had several conversations and [Press] understands our expectations are that a consistent training and match environment for a professional is an important factor for selection into women's national team rosters...I am certain that once Christen transitions to a new team, she will embrace being back on the pitch and will help her team be successful."

After signing with Kopparbergs/Göteborg FC at the end of March, Press was called up to the next United States camp in June for a set of friendlies against China. On June 12, Press became the 37th female player in U.S. history to play in 100 games for the US Women's National Team. She had two assists in the game as the United States won 2–1. On August 31, Press was honored for her 100th cap during a friendly against Chile in her hometown of Los Angeles and captained the team. She scored a goal in the 59th minute and the United States won 3–0.

In September, Press was named to the 20-player squad for the 2018 CONCACAF Women's Championship. She recorded a goal and two assists in a 5–0 victory over Panama in the group stage. The United States won their second consecutive CONCACAF Championship and earned a berth to the 2019 FIFA Women's World Cup in France.

=== 2019: FIFA Women's World Cup ===
In January 2019, Press scored the only goal in a 1–0 victory over Spain in a friendly in Alicante. At the 2019 SheBelieves Cup she assisted on Alex Morgan's goal, one minute after entering the game. A month later in a friendly against Belgium, Press recorded 3 assists in a 6–0 victory.

On May 2, 2019, Press was named to the final 23–player roster for the 2019 FIFA Women's World Cup—this was her second time to play for the Cup.

Press appeared in all three group stage games and started and played the full 90 minutes in the second group match against Chile. She was a second-half substitute in both the Round of 16 and the quarter-final matches. Press started the semi-final match against England and scored a goal in the 10th minute, to put the USA ahead 1–0, the United States would go on to win 2–1, advancing to their third straight World Cup Final. Press appeared in the World Cup Final as a second-half substitute replacing Megan Rapinoe. She was one of four U.S. players to play in all seven World Cup games. The United States defeated the Netherlands 2–0 in the Final, to win their second consecutive World Cup. This was Press' second World Cup win.

On November 7, 2019, Press became the 12th player in USWNT history to score 50 international goals. Her 50th goal occurred in the 28th minute of a friendly against Sweden. The United States won 3-2 and Press also recorded an assist in the game. Press finished 2019 with 5 goals and 12 assists. Her 12 assists lead the team, she was also the only member of the USWNT to appear in all 24 games in 2019.

=== 2020 ===
Press was named to the 20-player roster for the 2020 CONCACAF Olympic Qualifying tournament, which was her second time participating in Olympic qualifying. Press scored in all three group stage games, including two goals against Costa Rica. She also scored in the semi-final against Mexico. After the United States defeated Canada in the Championship game, Press was awarded the Golden Ball as the tournaments best player.

Press was named to the United States' 23-player roster for the 2020 SheBelieves Cup, where she appeared in all three matches. She was joint top scorer of the tournament notching two goals, one against England on March 5 and one against Japan on March 11. She also registered the assist on a game-winning goal against Spain on March 8, delivering a set piece to teammate Julie Ertz. The United States won the tournament, having won all three of their matches.

Press was named to the roster when the United States traveled to the Netherlands to face off in a friendly on November 27 in Breda. The team won 2-0 and Press registered another international assist on a goal scored by Rose Lavelle. Press led the team in goals total with seven scored, in which she was tied with teammate Lindsey Horan, and registered three assists in 2020.

=== 2021: Summer Olympics ===
Press would tally a total of six goals and five assists in 2021 for the United States. After missing a series of friendlies against Colombia in January through illness, Press was recalled to the USWNT squad in February for the 2021 SheBelieves Cup. She appeared in all three games and scored twice in victories over Brazil and Argentina as the United States retained the SheBelieves Cup.

In June 2021, Press was named in the 18-player United States Women's soccer team roster for the delayed 2020 Tokyo Olympics. She appeared in all six matches for the United States in the tournament; Press scored her final international goal, and also forced an own-goal in the team's 6-1 group stage win over New Zealand on July 24, and converted a penalty kick in the team's quarter-final shootout win over the Netherlands on July 30. The tournament saw the team take home the bronze medal on August 5 following their 4–3 victory over Australia, in what would be her 155th and ultimately final international appearance.

=== Departure and retirement ===
Press announced via social media on September 9, 2021, that she, despite being called up, would not take part in the upcoming international windows, stating that she needed a few months break to focus on her mental health and spiritual growth. Ahead of two abroad friendlies vs Australia in November 2021, USWNT head coach Vlatko Andonovski opted to leave a core group of veteran players off of his 22-player roster, which included Press. As a result of this decision, Press subsequently was not included in the 23-player roster for the 2022 SheBelieves Cup in February.

On June 13, 2022, Press was not included in the 23-player roster ahead of the 2022 CONCACAF W Championship. This decision sparked some confusion amongst media and fans, many of whom questioned Andonovski after Press had been logging consistent minutes for Angel City FC in the months leading up. When questioned by reporters on omitting Press, Andonovski claimed that she was performing well, but not out-performing the players in front of her.

Press suffered an ACL tear with her club team on June 11, 2022, and remained unavailable for national team selection while she underwent a succession of surgeries and recoveries. She returned to play for her club in October 2024 but was ultimately never called up to the national team again.

Following her retirement announcement, Press would be honored by USWNT on January 24, 2026, at halftime of a friendly against Paraguay. The match and ceremony took place at Dignity Health Sports Park in Carson, California, a short distance from Press' home suburb of Palos Verdes Estates.

== Personal life ==
Press is married to USWNT and former Manchester United W.F.C. teammate Tobin Heath, having been in a relationship since 2015.

On November 22, 2021, amidst the 2021 NWSL abuse scandal, Press alleged abuse against former Chicago Red Stars manager Rory Dames. Press revealed in an article by The Washington Post that she had tried to speak up about Dames' behavior in 2014 to former US Soccer President Sunil Gulati, but her "concerns were dismissed." Press went on to say that her request for a trade from the Chicago Red Stars in 2017 was due to Dames's treatment of her, and in 2018, she filed a complaint against him to US Soccer. The NWSL Players Association released a statement in support of Press and Press's former Red Stars teammates Jen Hoy and Sam Johnson, who came forward with similar allegations.

Since 2013, Press has worked with Grassroot Soccer, an adolescent health organization that leverages the power of soccer to equip young people with the life-saving information, services, and mentorship they need to live healthier lives. First joining as a Global Ambassador, she was elected to the organization's board of directors in 2018 and has visited its soccer-based health programs in South Africa and Zambia.

== In popular culture ==
=== Media and endorsements ===
Press has appeared in several advertisements and promotional pieces for Nike. In 2014, she was featured in a promo for Wheaties. In May 2015, she starred in television commercials for Coppertone. She became a brand ambassador for nutritional product manufacturer Genesis Today in February 2016. In January 2018, she partnered with Hydrive Energy Water.

Press' likeness appeared on The Simpsons along with teammates Alex Morgan and Abby Wambach in May 2015. The same year, she starred in the short film, An Equal Playing Field. She has been featured in a number of magazines including Self, Howler, Shape, Darling Magazine, and Glamour. In 2015, she was featured on the covers of Sports Illustrated and Yoga Digest.

In 2016, Press posed nude for the ESPN's annual The Body Issue magazine and was one of the athletes featured on a cover. Regarding appearing in the issue, Press said:

I think that a lot of women experience that balance between feeling insecure about and appreciative for their bodies. I definitely have. So, when I decided to say yes [to the shoot], I had all that in my mind and realized it would be a good opportunity to face some of my own fears and show my body some love.

Press was featured with her national teammates in the EA Sports' FIFA video game series in FIFA 16, the first time women players were included in the game. In October 2015, she was announced as a host for FOX Sports' @The Buzzer and led a Chicago Cubs crowd in singing "Take Me Out to the Ballgame" along with teammates Julie Ertz and Lori Chalupny.

=== Ticker tape parade and White House honor ===
Following the United States' win at the 2015 FIFA Women's World Cup, Press and her teammates became the first women's sports team to be honored with a ticker tape parade in New York City. Each player received a key to the city from Mayor Bill de Blasio. In October of the same year, the team was honored by President Barack Obama at the White House.

== Career statistics ==
=== Club ===
As of September 13, 2025

Appearances and goals by club, season and competition
Club	Season	League			National Cup (Note: Includes the Svenska Cupen and FA Cup)		League Cup (Note: Includes the NWSL Playoffs, FA League Cup, NWSL Challenge Cup, and NWSL x Liga MX Femenil Summer Cup)		Continental (Note: Includes the UEFA Champions League)		Total	
Club	Season	Division	Apps	Goals	Apps	Goals	Apps	Goals	Apps	Goals	Apps	Goals
Pali Blues	2010	USL W-League	10	4	—		—		—		10	4
magicJack	2011	WPS	17	8	—		2	0	—		19	8
Göteborg FC	2012	Damallsvenskan	21	17	6	5	—		6	3	33	25
Tyresö FF	2013	Damallsvenskan	20	23	3	3	—		9	9	32	35
Tyresö FF	2014	Damallsvenskan	6	2	0	0	—		0	0	6	2
Tyresö FF	Total		26	25	3	3	0	0	9	9	38	37
Chicago Red Stars	2014	NWSL	12	6	—		—		—		12	6
Chicago Red Stars	2015	NWSL	11	10	—		1	0	—		12	10
Chicago Red Stars	2016	NWSL	14	8	—		1	1	—		15	9
Chicago Red Stars	2017	NWSL	23	11	—		1	0	—		24	11
Chicago Red Stars	Total		60	35	0	0	3	1	0	0	63	36
Göteborg FC	2018	Damallsvenskan	8	4	0	0	—		0	0	8	4
Utah Royals FC	2018	NWSL	11	2	—		—		—		11	2
Utah Royals FC	2019	NWSL	14	8	—		—		—		14	8
Utah Royals FC	Total		25	10	0	0	0	0	0	0	25	10
Manchester United	2020–21	FA WSL	14	4	1	0	2	0	—		17	4
Angel City FC	2022	NWSL	8	2	0	0	5	2	—		13	4
Angel City FC	2023	NWSL	0	0	0	0	0	0	—		0	0
Angel City FC	2024	NWSL	9	1	0	0	2	0	—		11	1
Angel City FC	2025	NWSL	18	1	—		—		—		18	1
Angel City FC	Total		35	4	0	0	7	2	0	0	42	6
Career total			216	111	10	8	14	3	15	12	255	134

=== International summary ===
As of August 5, 2021

United States
Year	Apps	Gls
2013	12	8
2014	23	11
2015	20	10
2016	25	12
2017	16	3
2018	10	2
2019	24	5
2020	9	7
2021	16	6
Totals	155	64

=== International goals ===
As of match played July 24, 2021. United States score listed first, score column indicates score after each Press goal.

Goal	Date	Venue	Opponent	Score	Result	Competition	Ref.
1	February 9, 2013	EverBank Field, Jacksonville, Florida	Scotland	1–0	4–1	Friendly	
2	February 9, 2013	EverBank Field, Jacksonville, Florida	Scotland	2–0	4–1	Friendly	
3	February 13, 2013	LP Field, Nashville, Tennessee	Scotland	3–0	3–1	Friendly	
4	March 8, 2013	Estádio Municipal, Albufeira, Portugal	China	4–0	5–0	2013 Algarve Cup	
5	April 9, 2013	Cars Jeans Stadion, The Hague, Netherlands	Netherlands	2–0	3–1	Friendly	
6	April 9, 2013	Cars Jeans Stadion, The Hague, Netherlands	Netherlands	3–0	3–1	Friendly	
7	October 20, 2013	Alamodome, San Antonio, Texas	Australia	3–0	3–1	Friendly	
8	October 27, 2013	Candlestick Park, San Francisco, California	New Zealand	3–0	4–1	Friendly	
9	February 8, 2014	FAU Stadium, Boca Raton, Florida	Russia	4–0	7–0	Friendly	
10	February 8, 2014	FAU Stadium, Boca Raton, Florida	Russia	6–0	7–0	Friendly	
11	February 13, 2014	Georgia Dome, Atlanta, Georgia	Russia	8–0	8–0	Friendly	
12	March 10, 2014	Estádio Municipal, Albufeira, Portugal	Denmark	1–3	3–5	2014 Algarve Cup	
13	August 20, 2014	WakeMed Soccer Park, Cary, North Carolina	Switzerland	3–1	4–1	Friendly	
14	October 20, 2014	RFK Stadium, Washington, D.C.	Haiti	5–0	6–0	2014 CONCACAF Championship	
15	October 24, 2014	PPL Park, Chester, Pennsylvania	Mexico	3–0	3–0	2014 CONCACAF Championship	
16	December 18, 2014	Estádio Nacional Mané Garrincha, Brasília, Brazil	Argentina	1–0	7–0	2014 Torneio Internacional de Brasília	
17	December 18, 2014	Estádio Nacional Mané Garrincha, Brasília, Brazil	Argentina	2–0	7–0	2014 Torneio Internacional de Brasília	
18	December 18, 2014	Estádio Nacional Mané Garrincha, Brasília, Brazil	Argentina	4–0	7–0	2014 Torneio Internacional de Brasília	
19	December 18, 2014	Estádio Nacional Mané Garrincha, Brasília, Brazil	Argentina	7–0	7–0	2014 Torneio Internacional de Brasília	
20	March 11, 2015	Estádio Algarve, Faro, Portugal	France	2–0	2–0	2015 Algarve Cup	
21	June 8, 2015	Winnipeg Stadium, Winnipeg, Manitoba	Australia	2–1	3–1	2015 FIFA World Cup	
22	August 16, 2015	Heinz Field, Pittsburgh, Pennsylvania	Costa Rica	2–0	8–0	Friendly	
23	August 16, 2015	Heinz Field, Pittsburgh, Pennsylvania	Costa Rica	4–0	8–0	Friendly	
24	August 16, 2015	Heinz Field, Pittsburgh, Pennsylvania	Costa Rica	8–0	8–0	Friendly	
25	September 17, 2015	Ford Field, Detroit, Michigan	Haiti	2–0	5–0	Friendly	
26	December 10, 2015	Alamodome, San Antonio, Texas	Trinidad and Tobago	3–0	6–0	Friendly	
27	December 10, 2015	Alamodome, San Antonio, Texas	Trinidad and Tobago	4–0	6–0	Friendly	
28	December 10, 2015	Alamodome, San Antonio, Texas	Trinidad and Tobago	5–0	6–0	Friendly	
29	December 13, 2015	University of Phoenix Stadium, Glendale, Arizona	China	2–0	2–0	Friendly	
30	February 10, 2016	Toyota Stadium, Frisco, Texas	Costa Rica	5–0	5–0	2016 Olympic qualifying	
31	February 15, 2016	Toyota Stadium, Frisco, Texas	Puerto Rico	7–0	10–0	2016 Olympic qualifying	
32	April 6, 2016	Rentschler Field, East Hartford, Connecticut	Colombia	7–0	7–0	Friendly	
33	April 10, 2016	Talen Energy Stadium, Chester, Pennsylvania	Colombia	1–0	3–0	Friendly	
34	July 23, 2016	Children's Mercy Park, Kansas City, Kansas	Costa Rica	4–0	4–0	Friendly	
35	September 15, 2016	Mapfre Stadium, Columbus, Ohio	Thailand	2–0	9–0	Friendly	
36	October 19, 2016	Rio Tinto Stadium, Sandy, Utah	Switzerland	3–0	4–0	Friendly	
37	October 23, 2016	U.S. Bank Stadium, Minneapolis, Minnesota	Switzerland	3–1	5–1	Friendly	
38	November 10, 2016	Avaya Stadium, San Jose, California	Romania	1–0	8–1	Friendly	
39	November 10, 2016	Avaya Stadium, San Jose, California	Romania	4–1	8–1	Friendly	
40	November 10, 2016	Avaya Stadium, San Jose, California	Romania	5–1	8–1	Friendly	
41	November 13, 2016	StubHub Center, Carson, California	Romania	3–0	5–0	Friendly	
42	June 11, 2017	Komplett Arena, Sandefjord, Norway	Norway	1–0	1–0	Friendly	
43	July 31, 2017	Qualcomm Stadium, San Diego, California	Brazil	2–3	4–2	2017 Tournament of Nations	
44	October 22, 2017	WakeMed Soccer Park, Cary, North Carolina	South Korea	3–0	6–0	Friendly	
45	August 31, 2018	StubHub Center, Carson, California	Chile	3–0	3–0	Friendly	
46	October 7, 2018	WakeMed Soccer Park, Cary, North Carolina	Panama	4–0	5–0	2018 CONCACAF Championship	
47	January 22, 2019	Estadio José Rico Perez, Alicante, Spain	Spain	1–0	1–0	Friendly	
48	May 26, 2019	Red Bull Arena, Harrison, New Jersey	Mexico	3–0	3–0	Friendly	
49	July 2, 2019	Parc Olympique Lyonnais, Lyon, France	England	1–0	2–1	2019 FIFA World Cup	
50	November 7, 2019	Mapfre Stadium, Columbus, Ohio	Sweden	2–0	3–2	Friendly	
51	November 10, 2019	TIAA Bank Field, Jacksonville, Florida	Costa Rica	4–0	6–0	Friendly	
52	January 28, 2020	BBVA Stadium, Houston, Texas	Haiti	1–0	4–0	2020 Olympic qualifying	
53	January 31, 2020	BBVA Stadium, Houston, Texas	Panama	5–0	8–0	2020 Olympic qualifying	
54	February 4, 2020	BBVA Stadium, Houston, Texas	Costa Rica	1–0	1–0	2020 Olympic qualifying	
55	February 4, 2020	BBVA Stadium, Houston, Texas	Costa Rica	3–0	1–0	2020 Olympic qualifying	
56	February 7, 2020	Dignity Health Sports Park, Carson, California	Mexico	4–0	4–0	2020 Olympic qualifying	
57	March 5, 2020	Exploria Stadium, Orlando, Florida	England	1–0	2–0	2020 SheBelieves Cup	
58	March 11, 2020	Toyota Stadium, Frisco, Texas	Japan	2–0	3–1	2020 SheBelieves Cup	
59	February 21, 2021	Exploria Stadium, Orlando, Florida	Brazil	1–0	2–0	2021 SheBelieves Cup	
60	February 24, 2021	Exploria Stadium, Orlando, Florida	Argentina	6–0	6–0	2021 SheBelieves Cup	
61	June 16, 2021	Q2 Stadium, Austin, Texas	Nigeria	1–0	2–0	Friendly	
62	July 1, 2021	Rentschler Field, East Hartford, Connecticut	Mexico	2–0	4–0	Friendly	
63	July 1, 2021	Rentschler Field, East Hartford, Connecticut	Mexico	4–0	4–0	Friendly	
64	July 24, 2021	Saitama Stadium 2002, Saitama, Japan	New Zealand	4–1	6–1	2020 Summer Olympics	

=== World Cup appearances ===
Match	Date	Location	Opponent	Lineup	Result	Competition
2015 FIFA Women's World Cup
1	June 9, 2015	Winnipeg, Manitoba	Australia	off 68' (on Heath)	3–1 W	Group stage
2	June 13, 2015	Winnipeg, Manitoba	Sweden	off 66' (on Wambach)	0–0 D	Group stage
3	June 23, 2015	Edmonton, Alberta	Colombia	on 75' (off Rapinoe)	2–0 W	Round of 16
4	June 27, 2015	Ottawa, Ontario	China	on 61' (off O'Hara)	1–0 W	Quarter-final
2019 FIFA Women's World Cup
5	June 11, 2019	Reims, France	Thailand	on 57' (off Heath)	13–0 W	Group stage
6	June 16, 2019	Paris, France	Chile	Start	3–0 W	Group stage
7	June 20, 2019	Le Havre, France	Sweden	on 63' (off Lavelle)	2–0 W	Group stage
8	June 24, 2019	Reims, France	Spain	on 90+7' (off Rapinoe)	2–1 W	Round of 16
9	June 28, 2019	Paris, France	France	on 87' (off Rapinoe)	2–1 W	Quarter-final
10	July 2, 2019	Lyon, France	England	Start	2–1 W	Semi-final
11	July 7, 2019	Lyon, France	Netherlands	on 79' (off Rapinoe)	2–0 W	Final

=== Olympic appearances ===
Match	Date	Location	Opponent	Lineup	Result	Competition
2016 Women's Olympic Football Tournament
1	August 3, 2016	Belo Horizonte, Brazil	New Zealand	on 81' (off Morgan)	2–0 W	Group stage
2	August 6, 2016	Belo Horizonte, Brazil	France	on 90' (off Klingenberg)	1–0 W	Group stage
3	August 9, 2016	Manaus, Brazil	Colombia	Start	2–2 D	Group stage
4	August 12, 2016	Brasília, Brazil	Sweden	on 99' (off Rapinoe)	1–1 (4–3 p) (L)	Quarter-final
2020 Women's Olympic Football Tournament
5	July 21, 2021	Tokyo, Japan	Sweden	Start	3–0 L	Group stage
6	July 24, 2021	Saitama, Japan	New Zealand	on 67' (off Rapinoe)	6–1 W	Group stage
7	July 27, 2021	Kashima, Japan	Australia	off 74' (on Williams)	0–0 D	Group stage
8	July 30, 2021	Yokohama, Japan	Netherlands	on 58' (off Williams)	2–2 (4–2 p) (W)	Quarter-final
9	August 2, 2021	Kashima, Japan	Canada	on 61' (off Williams)	0–1 L	Semi-final
10	August 5, 2021	Kashima, Japan	Australia	off 85' (on Sonnett)	4–3 W	Bronze medal match

== Honors and awards ==
Kopparbergs/Göteborg FC

- Swedish Cup: 2012

Tyresö FF

- UEFA Women's Champions League runners-up: 2013–14

United States

- FIFA Women's World Cup: 2015, 2019
- Olympic Bronze Medal: 2020
- CONCACAF Women's Championship: 2014, 2018
- CONCACAF Women's Olympic Qualifying Tournament: 2016; 2020
- Algarve Cup: 2013, 2015
- SheBelieves Cup: 2016, 2018, 2020, 2021
- Tournament of Nations: 2018

Individual

- Hermann Trophy: 2010
- Pac-10 Conference Player of the Year: 2010
- Soccer America Player of the Year Award: 2010
- WPS Rookie of the Year: 2011
- GT Kristallkulan: 2012
- Damallsvenskan Golden Boot: 2013
- NWSL Best XI: 2015, 2016, 2017, 2019
- NWSL Player of the Month: April 2015, August 2019
- Damallsvenskan Player of the Month: April 2018
- CONCACAF Women's Olympic Qualifying Tournament Golden Ball: 2020
- CONCACAF Women's Olympic Qualifying Tournament Best XI: 2020

== See also ==
- List of FIFA Women's World Cup winning players
- List of multiple Olympic gold medalists in one event
- List of Olympic medalists in football
- List of players who have won multiple FIFA Women's World Cups
- List of players who have appeared in multiple FIFA Women's World Cups
- List of Chicago Red Stars players
- List of foreign Damallsvenskan players
- List of foreign FA Women's Super League players
- List of Stanford University people
- List of Kappa Alpha Theta sisters
- List of sportswomen
