= 2017 Chicago Red Stars season =

Chicago Red Stars
2017 season
- Owner: Arnim Whisler
- Head coach: Rory Dames
- Stadium: Toyota Park (capacity: 20,000)
- NWSL: 4th
- Top goalscorer: Christen Press (11)
- Highest home attendance: 4,934 (August 12 vs. POR)
- Lowest home attendance: 1,827 (May 14 vs. BOS)
- Average home league attendance: 3,198
Home colors	Away colors

The 2017 Chicago Red Stars season was the team's ninth season. The team competed in the National Women's Soccer League, the top tier of women's soccer in the United States. In 2017, for the third consecutive season, the Red Stars made it to the post-season playoffs and was eliminated in the semi-final.

== First-team squad ==
The entire 2017 roster was returned for 2018 NWSL season.

Roster

Players who were under contract to play for the club in 2017 NWSL season.

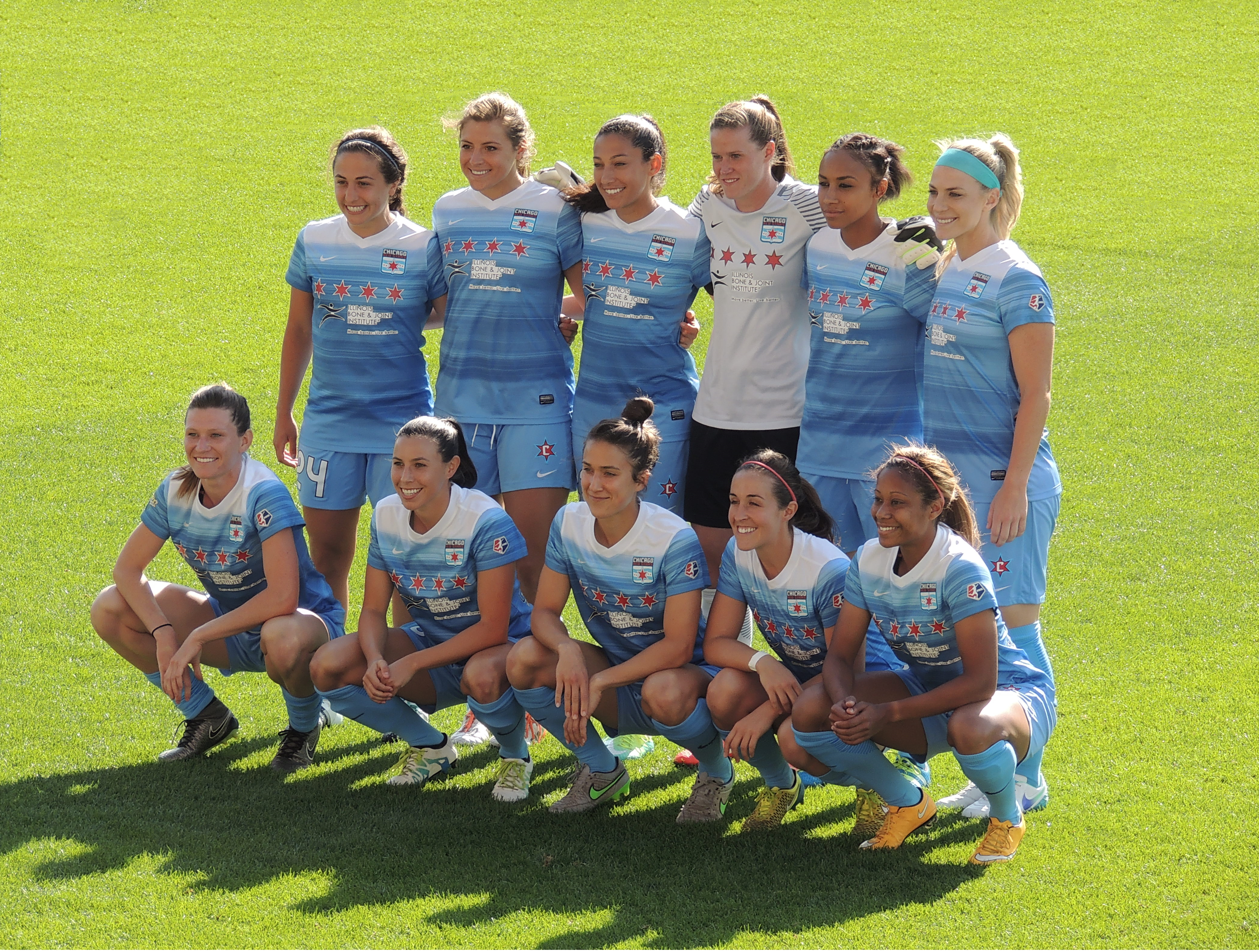
Chicago Red Stars Lineup 2017

=== 2018 squad ===
+ indicates player was added during the season, - indicates player was removed during the season.

Note: Flags indicate national team as defined under FIFA eligibility rules; some limited exceptions apply. Players may hold more than one non-FIFA nationality.

No.	Pos.	Nation	Player
1	GK	USA	Alyssa Naeher
2	FW	USA	Jen Hoy
3	DF	USA	Arin Gilliland
4	MF	USA	Alyssa Mautz
5	DF	USA	Katie Naughton
6	DF	USA	Casey Short
7	MF	USA	Taylor Comeau
8	MF	USA	Julie Ertz
9	FW	USA	Stephanie McCaffrey
10	DF	USA	Vanessa DiBernardo
11	MF	USA	Sofia Huerta

No.	Pos.	Nation	Player
12	FW	JPN	Yuki Nagasato +
13	MF	USA	Morgan Brian +
14	DF	USA	Sarah Gorden
15	MF	USA	Kristie Mewis +-
16	DF	USA	Samantha Johnson
18	GK	USA	Michele Dalton
19	MF	USA	Summer Green
23	FW	USA	Christen Press (captain)
24	MF	USA	Danielle Colaprico
30	MF	USA	Lauren Kaskie
34	MF	USA	Mary Luba -

College draft

Players selected by the club in 2017 NWSL College Draft.

Note: Flags indicate national team as defined under FIFA eligibility rules; some limited exceptions apply. Players may hold more than one non-FIFA nationality.

No.	Pos.	Nation	Player
—	FW	USA	Michele Vasconcelos
—	MF	USA	Morgan Proffitt
—	MF	USA	Lauren Kaskie

Loan to W-League clubs

After the 2018 season several Chicago Red Stars players were loaned to clubs of W-League of Australia to play in their 2017-2018 season.

Player	W-League club
Danielle Colaprico	Adelaide United FC
Alyssa Mautz	Adelaide United FC
Katie Naughton	Adelaide United FC
Arin Gilliland	Newcastle Jets FC

== Management and staff ==
Front Office

- Owner Arnim Whisler

Coaching Staff

- Manager Rory Dames
- Assistant coach Bonnie Young
- Assistant coach Brian Kibler
- Assistant and Goalkeeper Coach Jordi King

== Regular-season standings ==
=== League standing ===
Pos	Team	Pld	W	D	L	GF	GA	GD	Pts	Qualification
1	North Carolina Courage	24	16	1	7	38	22	+16	49	NWSL Shield
2	Portland Thorns FC (C)	24	14	5	5	37	20	+17	47	NWSL Playoffs
3	Orlando Pride	24	11	7	6	45	31	+14	40	NWSL Playoffs
4	Chicago Red Stars	24	11	6	7	33	30	+3	39	NWSL Playoffs
5	Seattle Reign FC	24	9	7	8	43	37	+6	34	
6	Sky Blue FC	24	10	3	11	42	51	−9	33	
7	FC Kansas City	24	8	7	9	29	31	−2	31	
8	Houston Dash	24	7	3	14	23	39	−16	24	
9	Boston Breakers	24	4	7	13	24	35	−11	19	
10	Washington Spirit	24	5	4	15	30	48	−18	19	

Source: NWSL
Rules for classification: Tiebreakers
(C) Champions

=== Weekly ranking ===
Week ending	April			May				June			July				August				September			October	
Week ending	16	23	30	7	14	21	28	4	18	25	2	9	16	23	6	13	20	27	3	10	24	1	X
Week	1	2	3	4	5	6	7	8	9	10	11	12	13	14	15	16	17	18	19	20	21	22	X
Rank	9	4	7	3	5	3	2	2	2	2	2	2	2	1	2	3	3	3	3	3	3	4	X
Games	1	2	3	4	5	6	7	8	9	10	12	13	14	15	16	17	19	20	21	22	23	24	X
Points	0	3	3	6	7	10	13	16	17	20	23	24	25	28	29	29	29	32	35	36	39	39	X

Update June 1, 2018 Source: NWSL 2017 season

=== Results summary ===
Overall								Home						Away					
Pld	W	D	L	GF	GA	GD	Pts	W	D	L	GF	GA	GD	W	D	L	GF	GA	GD
24	11	6	7	33	30	+3	39	7	2	3	19	15	+4	4	4	4	14	15	−1

Last updated: Sep 29, 2017.
Source: NWSLSoccer.com: 2017 Schedule: Chicago Red Stars

=== Match results ===
==== Preseason ====
Wed March 16	Wisconsin Badgers	Cancelled	Chicago Red Stars	Verona, Wisconsin
				Stadium: Reddan Soccer Complex
Note: Cancelled due to snow.

Sun March 26 Thorns Spring Invitational	Portland Thorns FC	1–0	Chicago Red Stars	Portland, Oregon
	Nadim 26' (pen.)			Stadium: Providence Park; Attendance: 6,802; Referee: Farhad Dadkho

Wed March 29 Thorns Spring Invitational	Chicago Red Stars	2–1	Houston Dash	Portland, Oregon
	Press 41' (pen.), 84' (Green)		Henderson 82' (pen.)	Stadium: Providence Park; Attendance: n/a Referee: Jason Perlewitz

Sat April 1 Thorns Spring Invitational	United States U-23	0–0	Chicago Red Stars	Portland, Oregon
				Stadium: Providence Park; Attendance: n/a Referee: Levi Rippy

Thurs April 6	Notre Dame Fighting Irish	1–3	Chicago Red Stars	Notre Dame, Indiana
	ND (2nd half)		Green (1st half); Gilliland (1st half); Naughton 90' (Raetzman)	Stadium: Alumni Stadium; Attendance: n/a

==== National Women's Soccer League ====
===== Regular season =====
Sat April 15 1	Houston Dash	2–0	Chicago Red Stars	Houston, Texas
	Ohai 15' (Brooks); Benites (yellow card) 56'; Daly 80' (Ohai)		Mautz (yellow card) 29'	Stadium: BBVA Compass Stadium; Attendance: 4,484; Referee: Farhad Dadkho

Sat April 22 2	Chicago Red Stars	1–0	FC Kansas City	Bridgeview, Illinois
	Ertz 41' (Huerta)			Stadium: Toyota Park; Attendance: 2,153; Referee: Greg Dopka

Sat April 29 3	Portland Thorns FC	1–0	Chicago Red Stars	Portland, Oregon
	Nadim 27' (pen.); Sonnett (yellow card) 51'; Boureille (yellow card) 67'		Ertz (yellow card) 64'; Press (yellow card) 90+2'	Stadium: Providence Park; Attendance: 14,471; Referee: Ramy Touchan

Sat May 6 4	Chicago Red Stars	2–0	Houston Dash	Bridgeview, Illinois
	Hagan 44' (o.g.); Ertz 61'; Press (yellow card) 82'		Benites (yellow card) 14'	Stadium: Toyota Park; Attendance: 2,114; Referee: Ekaterina Koroleva

Sun May 14 5	Chicago Red Stars	1–1	Boston Breakers	Bridgeview, Illinois
	Press 89' (Huerta)		Lavelle 69'; King (yellow card) 73'	Stadium: Toyota Park; Attendance: 1,827; Referee: Luis Guardia

Sun May 21 6	North Carolina Courage	1–3	Chicago Red Stars	Cary, North Carolina
	Williams 55' (Hinkle)		Press 30' (pen.); Huerta 37' (Press); DiBernardo 45' (Huerta); Short (yellow card) 75'; Ertz (yellow card) 90+4'	Stadium: Sahlen's Stadium; Attendance: 4,786; Referee: Rosendo Mendoza

Sat May 27 7	Chicago Red Stars	3–2	North Carolina Courage	Bridgeview, Illinois
15:00 CST	Colaprico 27' (DiBernardo) (yellow card) 39'; Mautz 54' (Press); DiBernardo 59'		Erceg 45+4' (Mewis); Debinha 82'	Stadium: Toyota Park; Attendance: 2,618; Referee: Becky Pagan

Sun June 4 8	Chicago Red Stars	1–0	Seattle Reign FC	Bridgeview, Illinois
15:00 CST	Press 49' (Huerta)		Rapinoe (yellow card) 89'	Stadium: Toyota Park; Attendance: 3,147; Referee: Malik Badawi

Sat June 17 9	Chicago Red Stars	1–1	Washington Spirit	Bridgeview, Illinois
14:50 CST	Naughton (yellow card) 31'; Press 82' (pen.)		Ordega 42' (Williams); Daugherty Howard (yellow card) 62'; Zadorsky (yellow card) 81'	Stadium: Toyota Park; Attendance: 3,189; Referee: Marie-Soleil Beaudoin

Sun June 25 10	Chicago Red Stars	2–1	Sky Blue FC	Bridgeview, Illinois
17:00 CST	DiBernardo 63'; Huerta 67' (Short)		Tiernan 3' (Lytle)	Stadium: Toyota Park; Attendance: 3,720; Referee: Karen Abt

Wed June 28 11	Seattle Reign FC	2–1	Chicago Red Stars	Seattle, Washington
19:30 PDT	Rapinoe 58' (pen.), 84' (pen.)		Mautz 41' (Ertz); Johnson (yellow card) 69'	Stadium: Memorial Stadium; Attendance: 3,586; Referee: Christopher Spivey

Sat July 1 12	Orlando Pride	0–1	Chicago Red Stars	Orlando, Florida
18:00 EDT	Krieger (yellow card) 52'		Press 68' (pen.)	Stadium: Orlando City Stadium; Attendance: 5,476; Referee: Guido Gonzales Jr.
Note: Kickoff was delayed by 1 hour due to rain.

Fri July 7 13	Boston Breakers	0–0	Chicago Red Stars	Boston, Massachusetts
	Mautz (yellow card) 62'		Chapman (yellow card) 80'; White (yellow card) 90'	Stadium: Jordan Field; Attendance: 2,435; Referee: Danielle Chesky

Sat July 15 14	Sky Blue FC	2–2	Chicago Red Stars	Piscataway, New Jersey
19:00 EST	Stanton (yellow card) 2'; Hayes 32'; Kerr (yellow card) 38' (goal) 90' (Killion); Skroski (yellow card) 74'; O'Hara (yellow card) 79'		Huerta 4' (Press); Press 26' (DiBernardo)	Stadium: Yurcak Field; Attendance: 2,529; Referee: Robi Hullner

Sat July 22 15	Chicago Red Stars	2–1	Orlando Pride	Bridgeview, Illinois
	Press 29' (Huerta), 52' (Hoy)		Marta (yellow card) 76'; Kennedy 90+3' (Hill)	Stadium: Toyota Park; Attendance: 4,742; Referee: Farhad Dadkho

Sat Aug 5 16	Orlando Pride	1–1	Chicago Red Stars	Orlando, Florida
	Morgan 24' (Spencer); Kennedy (yellow card) 69'		Johnson (yellow card) 51'; Huerta 53' (Hoy)	Stadium: Orlando City Stadium; Attendance: 5,667; Referee: Ekaterina Koroleva

Sat Aug 12 17	Chicago Red Stars	2–3	Portland Thorns FC	Bridgeview, Illinois
	Press 16'; Huerta 38' (Ertz); Gilliland (yellow card) 54'		Raso 3' (Horan); Sinclair 9' (Brynjarsdóttir); Sonnett 55' (Klingenberg)	Stadium: Toyota Park; Attendance: 4,934; Referee: Greg Dopka

Wed Aug 16 18	Chicago Red Stars	1–2	Seattle Reign FC	Bridgeview, Illinois
	Hoy 23' (Comeau)		Nairn (yellow card) 74'; Kawasumi 90' (Utsugi); Johnson 90+2' (Mathias)	Stadium: Toyota Park; Attendance: 2,876; Referee: Danielle Chesky

Sun Aug 20 19	Chicago Red Stars	1–3	FC Kansas City	Bridgeview, Illinois
	Short (yellow card) 26'; Ertz 64' (Nagasato); Naeher (yellow card) 90+3'		Leroux 23' (Groom); Bowen 29' (Groom); Groom (yellow card) 45'; Kelly 80' (LaBonta)	Stadium: Toyota Park; Attendance: 3,314; Referee: Karen Abt

Sat Aug 26 20	Washington Spirit	1–2	Chicago Red Stars	Boyds, Maryland
	Williams 81' (Pugh); Johnson (yellow card) 90+3'		Mewis 23' (Colaprico); Mautz (yellow card) 66'; Colaprico (yellow card) 70'; Press 87' (Ertz)	Stadium: Maryland SoccerPlex; Attendance: 3,469; Referee: Kevin Broadley

Sun Sep 3 21	Chicago Red Stars	2–1	North Carolina Courage	Bridgeview, Illinois
	Colaprico (yellow card) 40'; Nagasato 52' (Press); Ertz (yellow card) 73' (goal) 84' (Nagasato)		Williams 15' (McDonald); Zerboni (yellow card) 77'	Stadium: Toyota Park; Attendance: 3,745; Referee: Lukasz Szpala

Sat Sep 9 22	FC Kansas City	0–0	Chicago Red Stars	Kansas City, Missouri
	LaBonta (yellow card) 66'			Stadium: Swope Soccer Village; Attendance: 963; Referee: Michael Radchuk

Sat Sep 23 23	Houston Dash	2–3	Chicago Red Stars	Houston, Texas
	Brooks 24' (pen.); Andressinha (yellow card) 75'; Daly 85' (Mewis)		Hoy 12'; Short 20'; Press 45+2' (pen.); Nagasato (red card) 89'	Stadium: BBVA Compass Stadium; Attendance: 6,707; Referee: Marco Vega

Sat Sep 30 24	Portland Thorns FC	3–1	Chicago Red Stars	Portland, Oregon
	Raso 2'; Sykes 13'; Henry (yellow card) 42'; Nadim 83' (pen.)		Gilliland (yellow card) 25'; Kaskie (yellow card) 33'; Huerta 71'	Stadium: Providence Park; Attendance: 21,144; Referee: Elvis Osmanovic

===== Playoffs =====
Sun Oct 8 semi-final	North Carolina Courage	1–0	Chicago Red Stars	Cary, NC
3:30 p.m. ET	O'Sullivan 89' (McDonald)			Stadium: Sahlen's Stadium; Attendance: 10,017; Referee: Ramy Touchan

===== Players statistics =====
N	Player	GP	GS	Min	G	A	Sh	SOG	FC	Off	CK	PK	PKG	YC	RC
1	Alyssa Naeher	22	22	1980	0	0	0	0	2	0	0	0	0	1	0
2	Jen Hoy	13	8	635	2	2	10	4	7	10	0	0	0	0	0
3	Arin Gilliland	22	21	1765	0	0	5	1	21	1	3	0	0	2	0
4	Alyssa Mautz	24	15	1415	2	0	19	7	26	3	0	0	0	3	0
5	Katie Naughton	22	22	1958	0	0	3	1	6	0	0	0	0	1	0
6	Casey Short	22	21	1914	1	1	11	3	19	4	0	0	0	2	0
7	Taylor Comeau	19	10	1096	0	1	7	3	13	1	0	0	0	0	0
8	Julie Ertz	22	21	1932	4	3	16	7	36	1	0	0	0	3	0
9	Stephanie McCaffrey	12	4	364	0	0	7	3	2	3	0	0	0	0	0
10	Vanessa DiBernardo	20	20	1707	3	2	24	14	13	3	62	0	0	0	0
11	Sofia Huerta	24	21	1966	6	4	44	25	29	15	2	0	0	0	0
12	Yūki Nagasato	6	3	311	1	2	3	1	6	4	1	0	0	0	1
13	Morgan Brian	1	0	59	0	0	0	0	1	0	0	0	0	0	0
14	Sarah Gorden	4	3	224	0	0	0	0	2	0	0	0	0	0	0
15	Kristie Mewis	1	1	81	1	0	2	2	3	0	0	0	0	0	0
16	Samantha Johnson	22	22	1785	0	0	1	0	9	0	0	0	0	2	0
18	Michele Dalton	1	2	180	0	0	0	0	0	0	0	0	0	0	0
19	Summer Green	6	1	137	0	0	1	0	2	1	0	0	0	0	0
23	Christen Press	23	22	1997	11	4	84	49	24	30	0	6	4	2	0
24	Danielle Colaprico	23	21	1903	1	1	8	3	27	0	35	0	0	4	0
30	Lauren Kaskie	7	2	213	0	0	1	1	6	0	4	0	0	1	0
34	Mary Luba	0	0	0	0	0	0	0	0	0	0	0	0	0	0

== Honors and awards ==
=== NWSL annual awards ===
NWSL Best XI
Position	First team		Position	Second team	
Defender	Casey Short	2,004 minutes	Midfielder	Danielle Colaprico	1,093 minutes
Forward	Christen Press	5 game winning goals	Midfielder	Julie Ertz	4 goals, 3 assists
			Midfielder	Sofia Huerta	6 goals, 4 assists

=== NWSL Team of the Month ===
Month	Goalkeeper	Defenders	Midfielders	Forwards	Ref
April			(United States) Julie Ertz		
May		(United States) Samantha Johnson (United States) Casey Short	(United States) Danielle Colaprico	(United States) Christen Press	
June		(United States) Casey Short			
July		(United States) Casey Short	(United States) Julie Ertz		

=== NWSL Goal of the Week ===
Week	Result	Player	Ref.
5	Won	(United States) Christen Press	
6	Won	(United States) Sofia Huerta	
7	Nominated	(United States) Vanessa DiBernardo	
8	Nominated	(United States) Christen Press	
10	Won	(United States) Vanessa DiBernardo	
14	Won	(United States) Christen Press	
15	Won	(United States) Sofia Huerta	
19	Won	(United States) Julie Ertz	
21	Nominated	(United States) Casey Short	
22	Nominated	(United States) Sofia Huerta	

=== NWSL Save of the Week ===
Week	Result	Player	Ref.
4	Nominated	(United States) Alyssa Naeher	
5	Won	(United States) Alyssa Naeher	
6	Nominated	(United States) Alyssa Naeher	
7	Won	(United States) Danielle Colaprico	
11	Nominated	(United States) Danielle Colaprico	
