= Julie Ertz =

American soccer player (born 1992)

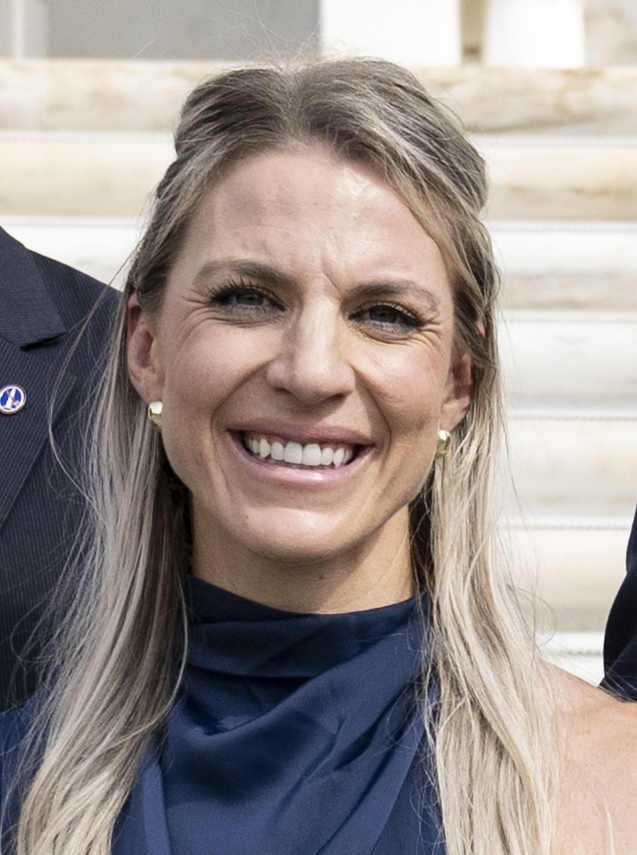
- Ertz in 2025

Personal information
- Full name: Julie Beth Ertz
- Birth name: Julie Beth Johnston
- Date of birth: April 6, 1992 (age 34)
- Place of birth: Mesa, Arizona, U.S.
- Height: 5 ft 7 in (1.70 m)
- Positions: Midfielder; defender

Youth career
- AYSO Region 503
- 2000–2004: Arizona Arsenal Soccer Club
- 2004–2010: Sereno Soccer Club

College career
Years	Team	Apps	(Gls)
2010–2013	Santa Clara Broncos	79	(31)

Senior career*
Years	Team	Apps	(Gls)
2014–2021	Chicago Red Stars	95	(6)
2023	Angel City FC	3	(1)

International career
- United States U15
- United States U18
2012	United States U20		
2013	United States U23		
2013–2023	United States	123	(20)
Medal record
Women's soccer
Representing the United States
Olympic Games
Bronze medal – third place	2020 Tokyo	Team
FIFA Women's World Cup
Gold medal – first place	2015 Canada	Team
Gold medal – first place	2019 France	Team
- * Club domestic league appearances and goals

Julie Beth Ertz (née Johnston; born April 6, 1992) is an American former professional soccer player. From 2014 to 2021, she played for National Women's Soccer League club Chicago Red Stars, and in 2023 she played for Angel City FC. A member of the United States women's national team from 2013 to 2023, she first appeared for the United States national team during an international friendly against Scotland on February 9, 2013, eventually making 123 total appearances for the team.

Ertz played collegiate soccer with the Santa Clara University Broncos from 2010 to 2013. Following her collegiate career, Ertz was selected third overall by the Chicago Red Stars in the 2014 NWSL College Draft and was named NWSL Rookie of the Year. Ertz helped the United States win their titles at the 2015 and 2019 FIFA Women's World Cup. At 23, she was the second youngest member of the 2015 team behind 22-year-old Morgan Brian. Ertz played every minute of all seven games of the 2015 tournament and was subsequently named to the FIFA Women's World Cup All-Star Team. After the 2023 World Cup, Ertz retired from international soccer.

After moving to center midfield for club and country in 2017, Ertz was awarded U.S. Soccer Female Player of the Year. Ertz was again nominated for U.S. Soccer Female Player of the Year in 2018 and won the U.S. Soccer Female Player of the Year in 2019. Her husband Zach plays in the National Football League (NFL).

== Early life ==
Born and raised in Mesa, Arizona, to Kristi and David Johnston, Ertz was raised with her sister Melanie Johnston. Julie was introduced to soccer through her local AYSO region. The Johnston sisters played for Sereno Soccer Club in Phoenix; Julie played for the 1992 side and Melanie played for the 1990s. Regarding Julie's switch to the team, Ertz stated that "it ended up being the best decision [she's] ever made." Sereno was a nationally known club with alumni that have gone on to play in college, on professional teams and for national teams. Ertz played with the team from 2004 to 2010 on the U13 through U19 teams. She won the state title nine times during her time there and was captain of the team.

Ertz attended Dobson High School in Mesa from 2006 to 2010, where she volunteered as a student athletic trainer all four years. She never played for the soccer team at the school, instead opting to devote her time to playing for Sereno. While at Dobson, Ertz was a member of the National Honor Society.

=== Santa Clara Broncos, 2010–2013 ===
Ertz attended Santa Clara University, where she majored in communications and played as a midfielder for the Broncos women's soccer team. In 2010, as a college freshman, she played in 20 games, starting 16 and accumulating 1,519 minutes of playing time. At the end of the season, she led the team in assists with five and recorded the third-most shots on the team with 31. She was named WCC Freshman of the Year and received NSCAA All-West Region Second-Team, Soccer America All-Freshman First-Team, All-WCC Second-Team, and WCC All-Freshman team honors.

As a sophomore in 2011, Ertz started all 21 games with nine goals and four assists for the Broncos. She scored four game-winning goals in matches away to Cal Poly, and at home to Washington State, California and Nevada. She was a WCC Hermann Trophy semi-finalist and was named to the NSCAA All-American First-Team as well as the All-WCC First-Team.

In 2012, which was her junior year, Ertz started 14 of the 15 games she played and led the Broncos with eight goals and was second on the team with five assists. She scored three game-winning goals and recorded an assist in the first round of the NCAA Women's Soccer Tournament in a match against Long Beach State. She was subsequently named to the All-WCC First Team and NCAA Division I Women All-West Region First Team. She was a MAC Hermann Trophy semi-finalist and was named U.S. Soccer Young Female Athlete of the Year.

In 2013, Ertz played in 22 games and led the team with eight assists and four game-winning goals. She made a total of 12 goals in the season and recorded an assist in the first round of the NCAA Women's Soccer Tournament in a match against University of California at Berkeley. At the end of the season, she was named to the NSCAA All-American First Team, NSCAA All-West Region First Team, All-WCC First Team and College Sports Madness All-WCC First Team. She was also named WCC Player of the Year and College Sports Madness WCC Player of the Year. Overall, Ertz made 79 appearances and scored 31 goals with the Broncos.

== Club career ==
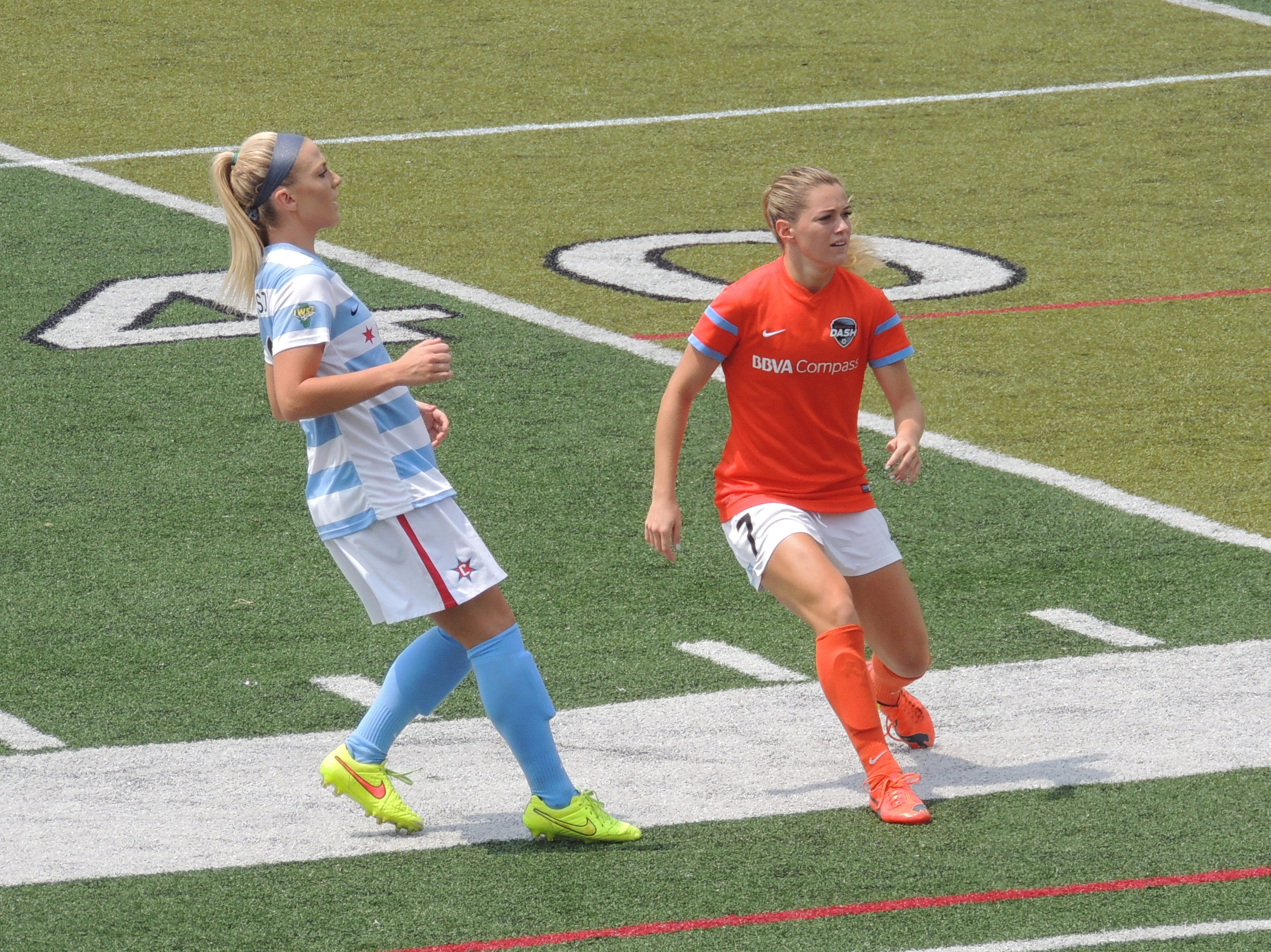
Ertz (then known as Johnston; left) with the Chicago Red Stars during a match against Houston Dash on July 26, 2014

=== Chicago Red Stars, 2014–2021 ===
On January 17, 2014, Ertz was selected third overall in the first round of the 2014 NWSL College Draft by the Chicago Red Stars. She subsequently signed with the team for the 2014 season. She made her first appearance for the team on April 19 in a match against the Western New York Flash. She scored the only goal of the match in the 59th minute. In the 2014 season, Ertz started in 21 matches and scored two goals. The Red Stars finished fifth in the regular season with a 9–7–8 record and did not advance to the playoffs. Following the 2014 season, Ertz was named NWSL Rookie of the Year and came second in voting (tied with Ali Krieger) behind Becky Sauerbrunn for NWSL Defender of the Year.

In 2015, Ertz missed almost half of the NWSL season due to commitments with the United States women's national team at the FIFA Women's World Cup in Canada. She returned to the Red Stars on July 22 during a match against the Boston Breakers, which ended in 2–1 victory for the Red Stars. She made 11 appearances for the Red Stars during the 2015 season, playing 990 minutes. The Red Stars finished second in the regular season with an 8–3–9 record and advanced to the playoffs. The Red Stars faced FC Kansas City in the semi-finals of the playoffs on September 13. Ertz started in the match, which ended in a 0–3 defeat for the Red Stars and they were eliminated from the playoffs. Following the 2015 season, Ertz was named to the NWSL Best XI and was again a finalist for Defender of the Year.

Ertz made twelve appearances for the Red Stars during the 2016 season before joining the national team in preparation for the 2016 Summer Olympics in Rio de Janeiro. She was a finalist for Defender of the Year for a third time.

In the 2017 season, Ertz debuted in a new role in attacking midfield, scoring the winning goal in a 1–0 victory over FC Kansas City in week 2. Ertz was named to the NWSL Second XI for the season after leading Chicago to the championship semi-final, where they lost out for the third consecutive season.

Ertz missed the beginning of the 2018 NWSL season as she was recovering from a knee injury suffered at the 2018 SheBelieves Cup. She made her first appearance of the season on April 28 in a 1–1 draw against the Washington Spirit. Ertz played in 15 games for the Red Stars in 2018 as they qualified for the playoffs for the fourth straight season. The semi-final was a rematch with the North Carolina Courage; Chicago lost 2–0 which was their fourth consecutive semi-final loss. Ertz was named the 2018 NWSL Second XI and was a finalist for Defender of the Year for a fourth time.

At the end of the 2019 season, Ertz and the Chicago Red Stars made their first appearance in the NWSL Championship against the North Carolina Courage.

On December 3, 2021, Ertz's rights were traded to Angel City FC ahead of the upcoming expansion draft.

=== Angel City FC, 2023 ===
After a year and a half break from competitive soccer, Ertz signed with Angel City FC as a free agent. She made her return to the NWSL in a match against San Diego Wave FC in April 2023.

On August 31, 2023, Ertz announced her retirement from professional soccer.

== International ==
=== Youth national teams ===
In 2006, Ertz attended the United States U14 National Identification Camp. In 2009, she was called into a U18 national team training camp from May 30 to June 7 at The Home Depot Center in Carson, California.

In 2012, Ertz competed in international under-20 youth soccer and scored a goal against Switzerland at the La Manga Tournament in Spain. Heading into the 2012 FIFA U-20 Women's World Cup, she had 13 caps and four goals for the U20 team. Ertz captained the United States team to the Japan 2012 U20 FIFA Women's World Cup; winning the 2012 CONCACAF Under-20 Women's Championship along the way. In the main tournament, one of the goals she scored was in the 4–0 semi-final victory over Mexico that advanced the United States to the World Cup finals. In Japan, Ertz captained her team to win the FIFA under-20 world cup, and won the Bronze Ball award herself.

In 2013, Ertz played for the U23 team in the Four Nations Tournament in La Manga, Spain. The team won the tournament, beating England in the final on March 7.

=== Senior national team ===
==== First caps, 2013–2014 ====
Ertz was first called up to the national team in January 2013, when she was on the 29-player roster for a training camp leading up to two matches against Scotland in early February. Ertz made her first appearance for the national team in their first match of the year on February 9, 2013, against Scotland. She came in for Becky Sauerbrunn in the 83rd minute to help the United States win the match 4–1.

Ertz traveled to Europe with the national team for matches against Germany and the Netherlands in early April. On April 9, Ertz started in the midfield in the match against the Netherlands. Ertz scored in the 73rd minute but the referee ruled that she was offside and the goal was called back. The United States won the match, 3–1. In late May, Ertz was named to the 21-player roster that traveled to Canada to train in preparation for a match against Canada on June 2. She did not appear in the match.

Ertz started off 2014 at a national team training camp from January 8 to 15 at U.S. Soccer's National Training Center in Carson, California. Ertz was not named to the roster for the 2014 Algarve Cup in March. In late April, Ertz was named to a 22-player roster for a match against Canada on May 8. She was then named to the roster for two games against France on June 14 and 19. Ertz was named to a 19-player roster for a match against Switzerland on August 20 in Sandy, Utah. She came in for Sauerbrunn in the second half and the United States went on to win 4–1.

Ertz joined the national team for a training camp at the end of August in order to prepare for two matches against Mexico in September as well as the 2014 CONCACAF Women's qualifying tournament in October. Initially, she was not named to the roster for the 2014 CONCACAF Women's Championship that served as a qualification for the 2015 FIFA Women's World Cup. However, one day before the team's first match of the tournament, Ertz replaced an injured Crystal Dunn on the roster. The United States qualified for the 2015 FIFA Women's World Cup after a semi-final win against Mexico on October 24. Following the CONCACAF Qualifying tournament, Ertz was named to the 24-player roster for the International Tournament of Brasília in Brazil that took place from December 10 to 21. Ertz made one appearance in the opening game of the tournament on December 10 against China, which resulted in a 1–1 draw. The final game against Brazil was a 0–0 draw, but the tournament title was given to Brazil, who had more points from the group stage.

==== 2015 FIFA Women's World Cup ====
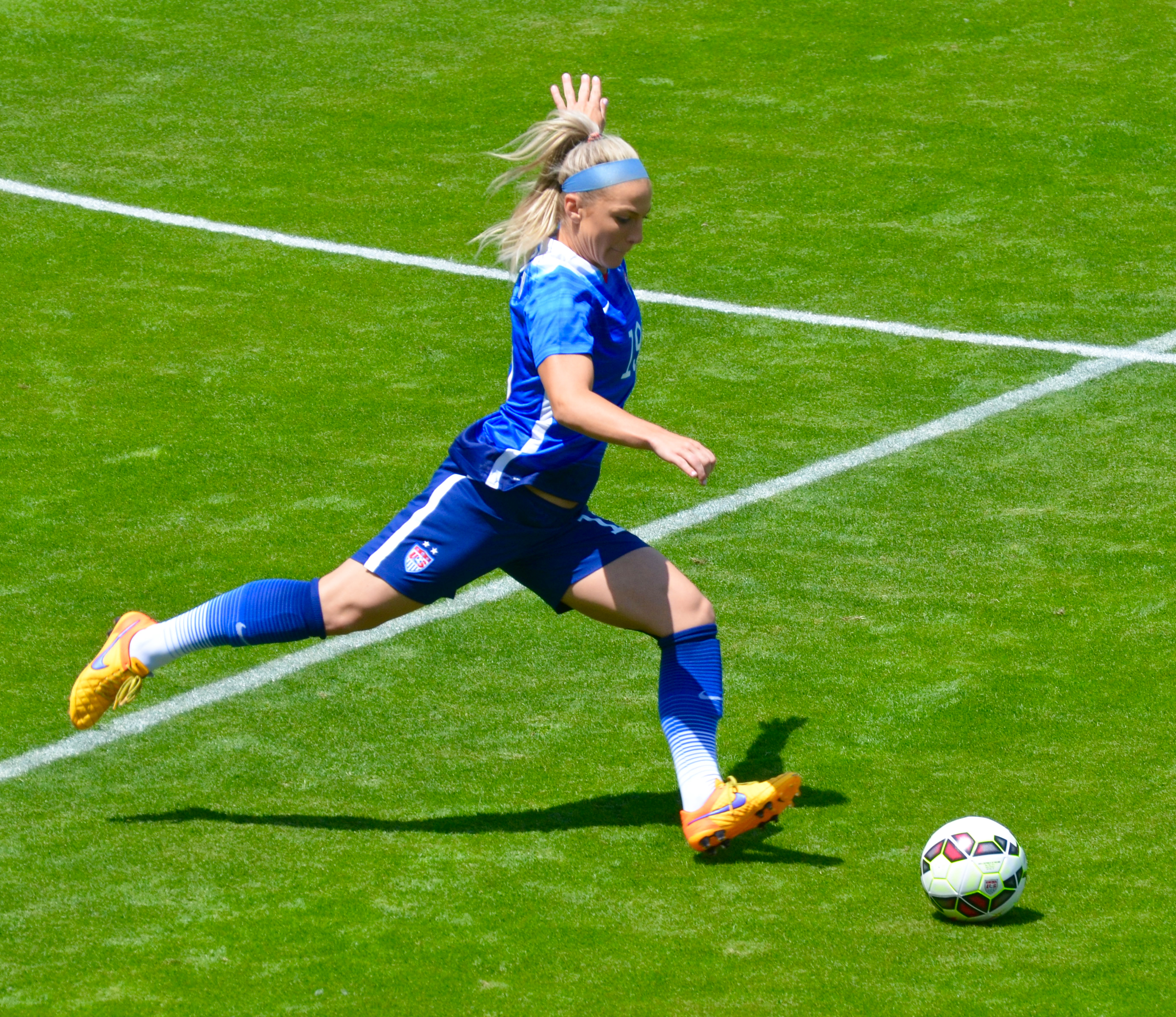
Playing in a friendly, May 2015

Ertz started off 2015 at a 21-day training camp from January 5 to 25 at the U.S. Soccer National Training Center in Carson, California. Following the training camp, she was named to the 24–player team that would travel on a 13-day trip to Europe for matches against France and England in mid-February. On February 21, Ertz was named to the 25-player roster for the 2015 Algarve Cup in Portugal. She started three matches of the tournament, including in the final against France on March 11. During the game, Ertz scored her first international goal in the 7th minute to help the United States defeat France 2–0 to win the tournament.

On April 14, Ertz was named to the 23-player roster that would represent the United States at the 2015 FIFA Women's World Cup. She was one of the five United States players that played every minute in all seven matches for the United States during the World Cup. In the 59th minute of the team's semi-final match against Germany on June 30, Ertz pulled down opposition player Alexandra Popp inside the penalty box and was given a yellow card. Celia Sasic took the subsequent penalty kick but missed the net. The United States went on to win the match 2–0 to advance to the World Cup final. In the final, the United States faced Japan on July 5. In the 52nd minute, Ertz attempted to block a free kick but instead scored an own goal. However, the United States still went on to win the match and the World Cup title. Following the tournament, Ertz was named to the FIFA Women's World Cup All-Star Team. She joined the national team on a Victory Tour following their World Cup win that started in Pittsburgh, Pennsylvania on August 16 and ended in New Orleans, Louisiana on December 16.

==== 2016 Rio Olympics ====
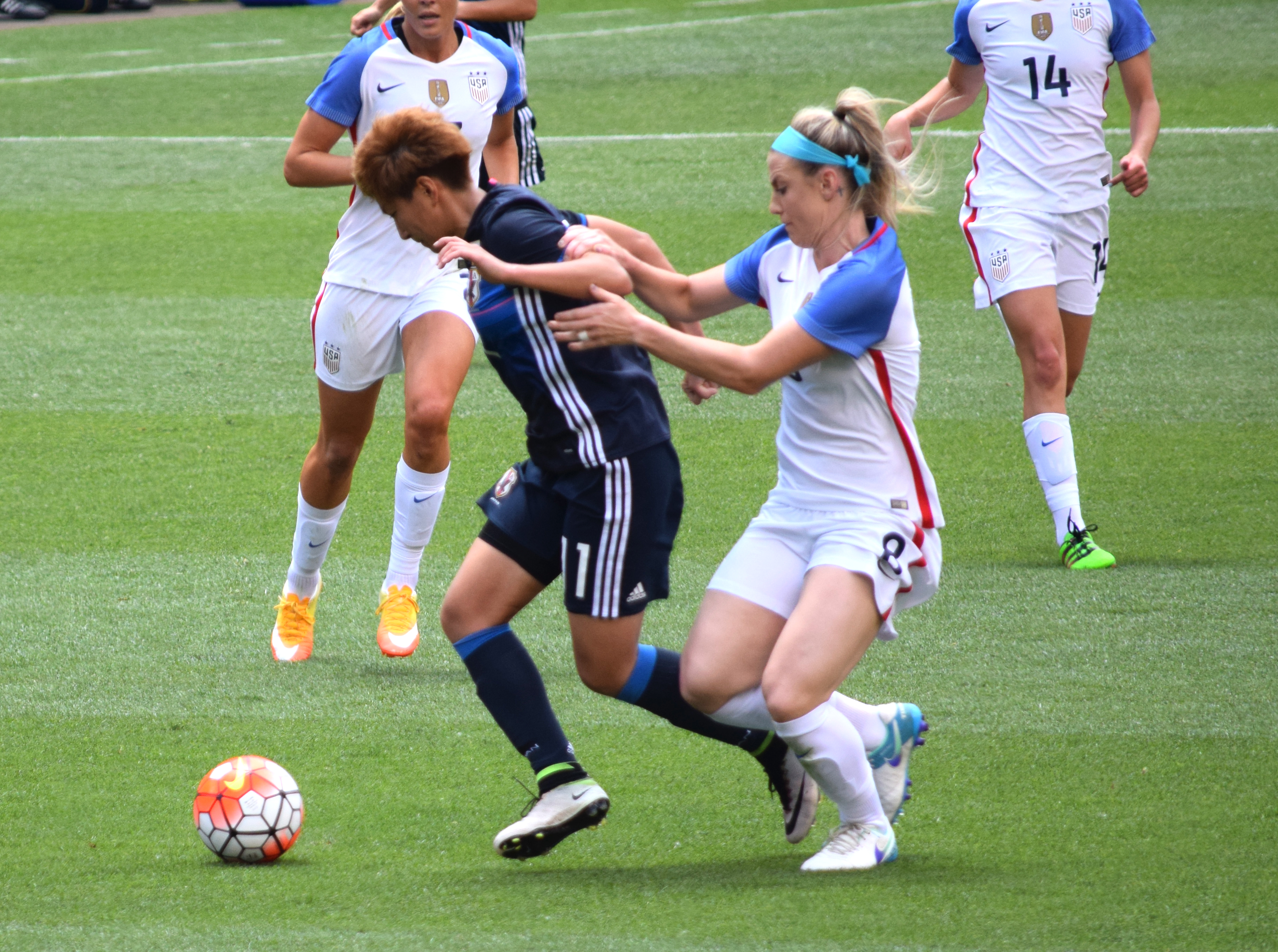
Yuika Sugasawa is fouled by Ertz in the 13th minute of the match between the United States and Japan on June 5, 2016

Ertz joined the national team for their first training camp of the year at the U.S. Soccer National Training Center in Carson, California from January 5 to 21. She was then named to the 20-player roster for 2016 CONCACAF Women's Olympic Qualifying tournament. The United States qualified to the 2016 Olympic Games in Rio de Janeiro after a semi-final win against Trinidad and Tobago on February 19. The United States won the tournament after defeating Canada 2–0 on February 21.

Ertz was named to the roster for the 2016 SheBelieves Cup that took place from March 3 to 9. She came in for Alex Morgan in the 80th minute of the team's opening match of the tournament on March 3 against England. She also made appearances in other two matches of the tournament, helping the United States win the 2016 SheBelieves Cup with a 2–1 win over Germany in their final game.

Ertz joined a 23-player roster for a training camp ahead of two matches against Colombia in early April. In the second match on April 10, Ertz played all 90 minutes and scored two goals to help the United States defeat Colombia 3–0. Ertz was on the roster for another two-game series against Japan in early June. She started in both games and scored a goal in the 27th minute of the second match on June 5.

On July 12, Ertz was selected as part of the 18-player United States squad for the 2016 Summer Olympics in Rio de Janeiro. She made her Olympic debut on August 3 in the team's opening match against New Zealand, a 2–0 victory. She did not appear in the team's remaining two group matches due to a sore groin. She returned for the team's quarterfinal match against Sweden where she played the full game, which the U.S. would go on to lose in penalty kicks.

==== 2019 FIFA World Cup ====
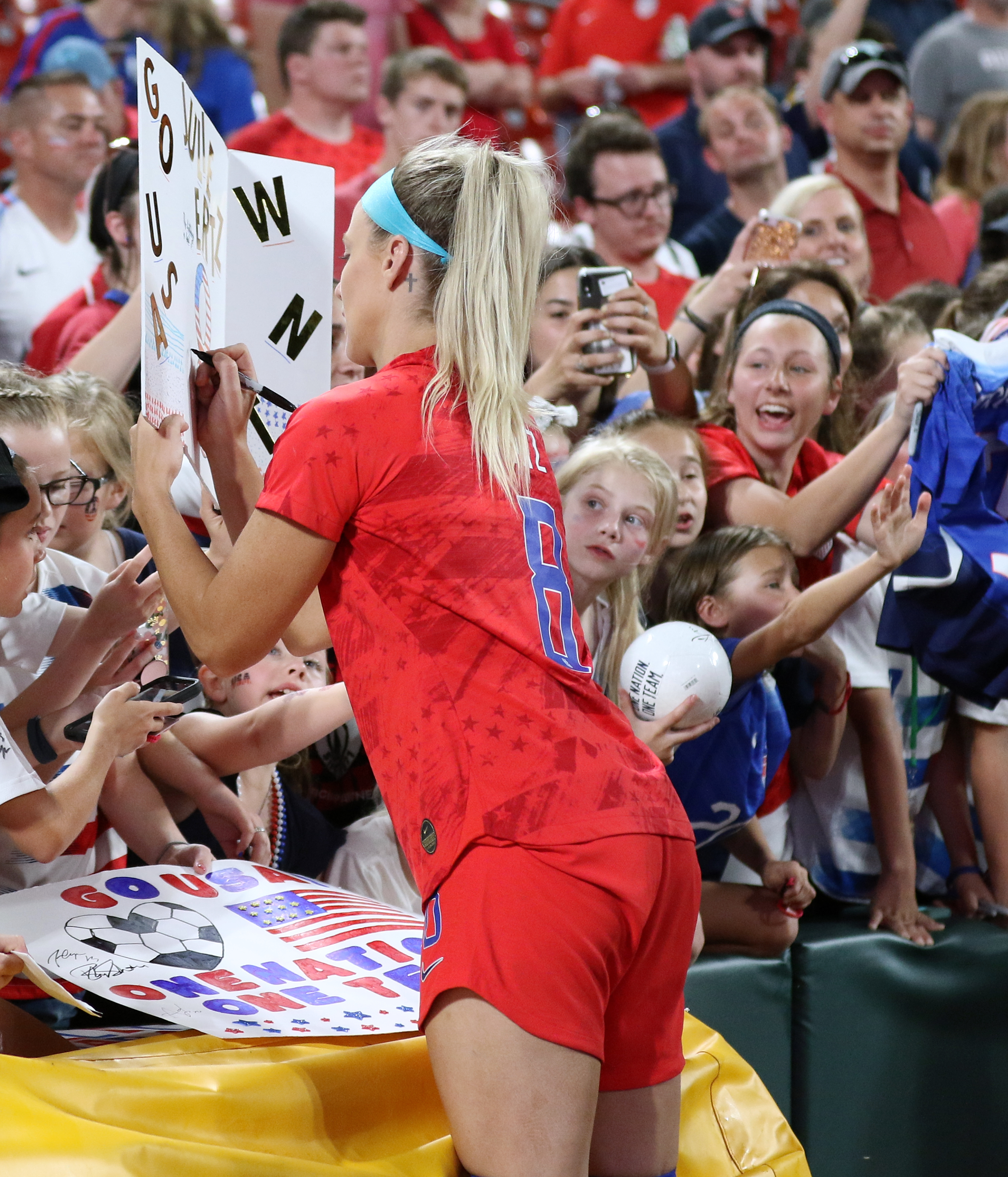
Ertz signing a fan's poster in a friendly before the 2019 FIFA Women's World Cup

Beginning in 2017, Ertz was shifted from center back to a defensive center midfield position as coach Jill Ellis experimented with new formations. She found success in the role and in 2017 she was named the U.S. Soccer Female Player of the Year. In May 2019, she was named to the final 23-player roster for the 2019 FIFA Women's World Cup in France, marking her second World Cup appearance. She scored in the 3–0 win over Chile. Ertz also won US Soccer's Female Player of the Year award. She was nominated alongside teammates Rose Lavelle, Carli Lloyd, Alex Morgan, Alyssa Naeher and Megan Rapinoe.

==== 2020 SheBelieves Cup ====
Ertz played her 100th match for the United States at the 2020 SheBelieves Cup in a 2–0 win against England.

== Personal life ==
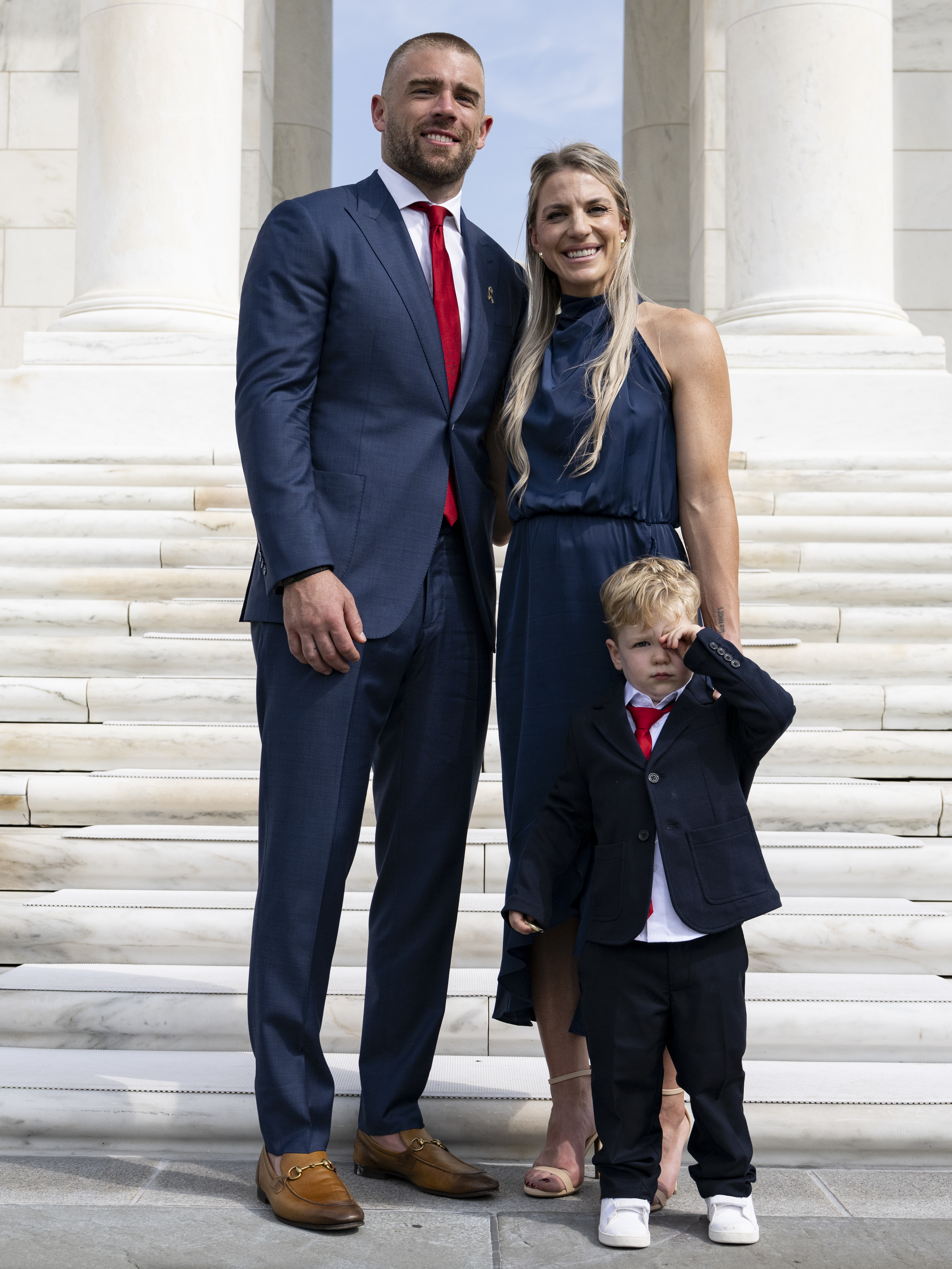
Julie, her husband Zach, and their son Madden at the Tomb of the Unknown Soldier in Arlington National Cemetery, 2025

In February 2016, she became engaged to NFL tight end Zach Ertz at Klein Field, the Stanford University baseball stadium where they first met. They were married on March 26, 2017, on the coast of Santa Barbara, California. Zach and Julie Ertz were featured in ESPN The Magazine's The Body Issue 2017. Their first son Madden was born on August 11, 2022. On August 24, 2024, they announced the birth of twin sons Kace and Kyren.

Ertz was featured along with her national teammates in the EA Sports' FIFA video game series in FIFA 16, the first time women players were included in the game and has been included in every EA Sports FIFA title since. Following the United States' win at the 2015 FIFA Women's World Cup, Ertz and her teammates became the first women's sports team to be honored with a ticker-tape parade in New York City. Each player received a key to the city from Mayor Bill de Blasio. In October of the same year, the team was honored by President Barack Obama at the White House.

== Career statistics ==
=== Club ===
As of match played May 13, 2023

Club	Season	League			Cup (Note: Includes the NWSL Challenge Cup)		Playoffs (Note: Includes NWSL Playoffs)		Other		Total	
Club	Season	Division	Apps	Goals	Apps	Goals	Apps	Goals	Apps	Goals	Apps	Goals
Chicago Red Stars	2014	NWSL	21	2	—		—		—		21	2
Chicago Red Stars	2015	NWSL	11	0	—		1	0	—		12	0
Chicago Red Stars	2016	NWSL	12	0	—		1	0	—		13	0
Chicago Red Stars	2017	NWSL	22	4	—		1	0	—		23	4
Chicago Red Stars	2018	NWSL	14	0	—		1	0	—		15	0
Chicago Red Stars	2019	NWSL	14	0	—		2	0	—		16	0
Chicago Red Stars	2020	NWSL	—		6	0	—		0 (Note: Includes the NWSL Fall Series)	0	6	0
Chicago Red Stars	2021	NWSL	1	0	2	0	0	0	—		3	0
Angel City FC	2023	NWSL	3	1	0	0	—		—		3	1
Career total			98	7	8	0	6	0	0	0	112	7

=== International ===
As of match played September 21, 2023

Appearances and goals by national team and year
National team	Year	Apps	Goals
United States	2013	2	0
United States	2014	3	0
United States	2015	21	5
United States	2016	19	3
United States	2017	12	6
United States	2018	16	4
United States	2019	22	1
United States	2020	8	1
United States	2021	13	0
United States	2022	–	–
United States	2023	7	0
Total		123	20

Scores and results list United States's goal tally first, score column indicates score after each Ertz goal.

List of international goals scored by Julie Ertz
No.	Date	Venue	Opponent	Score	Result	Competition	Ref.
1	March 11, 2015	Faro	France	1–0	2–0	2015 Algarve Cup	
2	April 4, 2015	St. Louis	New Zealand	3–0	4–0	Friendly	
3	May 10, 2015	San Jose	Republic of Ireland	3–0	3–0	Friendly	
4	August 16, 2015	Pittsburgh	Costa Rica	3–0	8–0	Friendly	
5	September 20, 2015	Birmingham	Haiti	1–0	8–0	Friendly	
6	April 10, 2016	Chester	Colombia	2–0	3–0	Friendly	
7	April 10, 2016	Chester	Colombia	3–0	3–0	Friendly	
8	June 5, 2016	Cleveland	Japan	1–0	2–0	Friendly	
9	July 31, 2017	San Diego	Brazil	4–3	4–3	2017 Tournament of Nations	
10	September 15, 2017	Commerce City	New Zealand	1–0	3–1	Friendly	
11	September 15, 2017	Commerce City	New Zealand	2–0	3–1	Friendly	
12	October 19, 2017	New Orleans	South Korea	1–0	3–1	Friendly	
13	October 22, 2017	Cary	South Korea	4–0	6–0	Friendly	
14	November 12, 2017	San Jose	Canada	1–0	3–1	Friendly	
15	January 21, 2018	San Diego	Denmark	2–1	5–1	Friendly	
16	August 2, 2018	Bridgeview	Brazil	2–1	4–1	2018 Tournament of Nations	
17	October 4, 2018	Cary	Mexico	2–0	6–0	2018 CONCACAF Women's Championship	
18	October 14, 2018	Frisco	Jamaica	3–0	6–0	2018 CONCACAF Women's Championship	
19	June 16, 2019	Paris	Chile	2–0	3–0	2019 FIFA Women's World Cup	
20	March 8, 2020	Harrison	Spain	1–0	1–0	2020 SheBelieves Cup	

== Honors and awards ==
Chicago Red Stars

- NWSL Championship runner-up: 2019, 2021
- NWSL Challenge Cup runner-up: 2020

United States U20

- CONCACAF U-20 Women's Championship: 2012
- FIFA U-20 Women's World Cup: 2012

United States

- FIFA Women's World Cup: 2015, 2019
- CONCACAF Women's Championship: 2014, 2018
- Olympic Bronze Medal: 2020
- CONCACAF Women's Olympic Qualifying Tournament: 2016; 2020
- SheBelieves Cup: 2016; 2018; 2020, 2021
- Tournament of Nations: 2018
- Algarve Cup: 2015

Individual

- U.S. Soccer Female Player of the Year: 2017, 2019
- U.S. Soccer Young Female Athlete of the Year: 2012
- CONCACAF Women's Championship Golden Ball: 2018
- CONCACAF Women's Championship Best XI: 2018
- IFFHS Women's World Team: 2019
- Best NWSL Player ESPY Award: 2021
- FIFA FIFPro Women's World XI: 2015, 2019
- NWSL Rookie of the Year: 2014
- NWSL Best XI: 2015
- NWSL Second XI: 2016, 2017, 2018
- WCC Freshman of the Year: 2010
- NSCAA All-West Region Second Team: 2010
- Soccer America All-Freshman First Team: 2010
- All-WCC Second Team: 2010
- WCC All-Freshman Team: 2010
- NSCAA All-American First Team: 2011, 2013
- All-WCC First Team: 2011, 2012, 2013
- Top Drawer Soccer Team of the Year: 2012
- NCAA Division I Women All-West Region First Team: 2012
- NSCAA All-West Region First Team: 2013
- WCC Player of the Year: 2013
- College Sports Madness WCC Player of the Year: 2013
- College Sports Madness All-WCC First Team: 2013

== See also ==
- 2012 FIFA U-20 Women's World Cup squads
