= 2020 SheBelieves Cup =

Tournament details
- Host country: United States
- Dates: March 5–11
- Teams: 4 (from 3 confederations)
- Venues: 3 (in 3 host cities)

Final positions
- Champions: United States (3rd title)
- Runners-up: Spain
- Third place: England
- Fourth place: Japan

Tournament statistics
- Matches played: 6
- Goals scored: 13 (2.17 per match)
- Attendance: 94,920 (15,820 per match)
- Top scorer(s): (Japan) Mana Iwabuchi (Spain) Lucía García (Spain) Alexia Putellas (United States) Christen Press (2 goals each)
- Best player: (Spain) Alexia Putellas

The 2020 SheBelieves Cup was the fifth edition of the SheBelieves Cup, an invitational women's soccer tournament held in the United States.

Featuring national teams from Spain, England, Japan, and hosts United States, it began on March 5 and ended on March 11, 2020, making it the last soccer tournament in the United States to be completed before the COVID-19 pandemic shut down all professional sports in the country. Apart from host United States, England were the only other team to have featured in every tournament, but this is the last time they have featured to date. 2020 was Japan's second appearance following their debut in 2019, while it was the first time Spain had taken part.

England were the defending champions.

The United States won their third overall title.

== Format ==
The four invited teams played a round-robin tournament. Points awarded in the group stage followed the formula of three points for a win, one point for a draw, and zero points for a loss. A tie in points would be decided by goal differential; other tie-breakers are listed below.

== Venues ==
Orlando	Harrison (New York City area)	Frisco (Dallas-Fort Worth area)
Exploria Stadium	Red Bull Arena	Toyota Stadium
Capacity: 25,500	Capacity: 25,000	Capacity: 20,500
2020 SheBelieves Cup is located in the United States

== Teams ==
Team	FIFA Rankings (December 2019)
United States	1
England	6
Japan	10
Spain	13

== Standings ==
Pos	Team	Pld	W	D	L	GF	GA	GD	Pts
1st place, gold medalist(s)	United States (H, C)	3	3	0	0	6	1	+5	9
2nd place, silver medalist(s)	Spain	3	2	0	1	4	2	+2	6
3rd place, bronze medalist(s)	England	3	1	0	2	1	3	−2	3
4	Japan	3	0	0	3	2	7	−5	0

Source: US Soccer
Rules for classification: 1) points; 2) goal difference; 3) goals scored; 4) head-to-head result; 5) fair play ranking
(C) Champions; (H) Hosts

== Results ==
March 5, 2020
16:15 ET

Spain	3–1	Japan
Putellas 8'; L. García 48', 78'	Report	Iwabuchi 44'

Exploria Stadium, Orlando, Florida
Attendance: 7,528
Referee: Katja Koroleva (United States)
March 5, 2020
19:00 ET

United States	2–0	England
Press 53'; Lloyd 55'	Report

Exploria Stadium, Orlando, Florida
Attendance: 16,531
Referee: Odette Hamilton (Jamaica)

March 8, 2020
14:15 ET

Japan	0–1	England
	Report	White 84'

Red Bull Arena, Harrison, New Jersey
Attendance: 14,758
Referee: Katja Koroleva (United States)
March 8, 2020
17:00 ET

United States	1–0	Spain
Ertz 87'	Report

Red Bull Arena, Harrison, New Jersey
Attendance: 26,500
Referee: Katia García (Mexico)

March 11, 2020
16:15 CT

England	0–1	Spain
	Report	Putellas 83'

Toyota Stadium, Frisco, Texas
Attendance: 10,507
Referee: Danielle Chesky (United States)
March 11, 2020
19:00 CT

United States	3–1	Japan
Rapinoe 7'; Press 26'; Horan 83'	Report	Iwabuchi 58'

Toyota Stadium, Frisco, Texas
Attendance: 19,096
Referee: Melissa Borjas (Honduras)

== Goalscorers ==
There were 13 goals scored in 6 matches, for an average of 2.17 goals per match.

2 goals

- (Japan) Mana Iwabuchi
- (Spain) Lucía García
- (Spain) Alexia Putellas
- (United States) Christen Press

1 goal

- (England) Ellen White
- (United States) Julie Ertz
- (United States) Lindsey Horan
- (United States) Carli Lloyd
- (United States) Megan Rapinoe
