= 2021 SheBelieves Cup =

Tournament details
- Host country: United States
- Dates: February 18–24
- Teams: 4 (from 2 confederations)
- Venue: 1 (in 1 host city)

Final positions
- Champions: United States (4th title)
- Runners-up: Brazil
- Third place: Canada
- Fourth place: Argentina

Tournament statistics
- Matches played: 6
- Goals scored: 17 (2.83 per match)
- Attendance: 14,682 (2,447 per match)
- Top scorer(s): (United States) Megan Rapinoe (3 goals)
- Best player: (United States) Rose Lavelle

The 2021 SheBelieves Cup was the sixth edition of the SheBelieves Cup, an invitational women's soccer tournament held in the United States.

Featuring national teams from Canada, Brazil, Argentina, and hosts United States, it began on February 18 and ended on February 24, 2021. Argentina replaced Japan after it withdrew due to the COVID-19 pandemic.

The United States successfully defended their crown, capturing their fourth title.

== Format ==
The four invited teams played a round-robin tournament. Points awarded in the group stage followed the formula of three points for a win, one point for a draw, and zero points for a loss. A tie in points would be decided by goal differential; other tie-breakers are listed below.

== Venue ==
Orlando
Exploria Stadium
Capacity: 25,500*
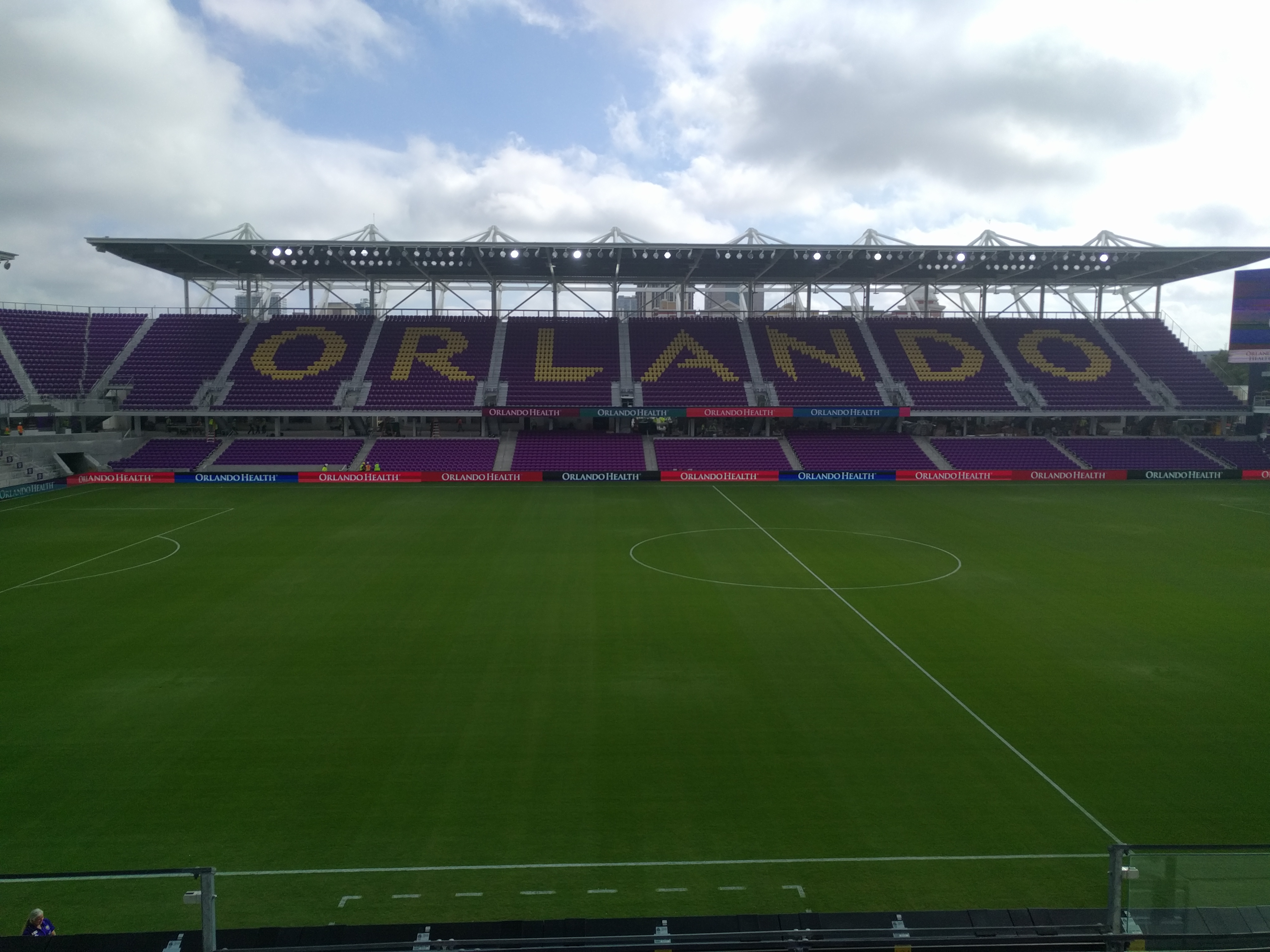

* Due to the COVID-19 pandemic, attendance at games was limited.

== Teams ==
Team	FIFA Rankings (December 2020)
United States	1
Brazil	8
Canada	8
Argentina	31

== Standings ==
Pos	Team	Pld	W	D	L	GF	GA	GD	Pts
1st place, gold medalist(s)	United States (C, H)	3	3	0	0	9	0	+9	9
2nd place, silver medalist(s)	Brazil	3	2	0	1	6	3	+3	6
3rd place, bronze medalist(s)	Canada	3	1	0	2	1	3	−2	3
4	Argentina	3	0	0	3	1	11	−10	0

Source: US Soccer
Rules for classification: 1) points; 2) goal difference; 3) goals scored; 4) head-to-head result; 5) Fair Play ranking.
(C) Champions; (H) Hosts

== Results ==
All times are local (UTC−5).

February 18, 2021
16:05

Brazil	4–1	Argentina
Marta 30' (pen.); Debinha 47'; Adriana 54'; Geyse 84'	Report	Larroquette 60'

Exploria Stadium, Orlando, Florida
Attendance: 1,119
Referee: Katja Koroleva (United States)
February 18, 2021
19:05

United States	1–0	Canada
Lavelle 79'	Report

Exploria Stadium, Orlando, Florida
Attendance: 3,104
Referee: Francia González (Mexico)

February 21, 2021
15:05

United States	2–0	Brazil
Press 11'; Rapinoe 88'	Report

Exploria Stadium, Orlando, Florida
Attendance: 4,000
Referee: Melissa Borjas (Honduras)
February 21, 2021
18:05

Argentina	0–1	Canada
	Report	Stratigakis 90+2'

Exploria Stadium, Orlando, Florida
Attendance: 1,348
Referee: Tori Penso (United States)

February 24, 2021
16:05

Canada	0–2	Brazil
	Report	Debinha 15'; Julia 39'

Exploria Stadium, Orlando, Florida
Attendance: 1,409
Referee: Danielle Chesky (United States)
February 24, 2021
19:05

United States	6–0	Argentina
Rapinoe 16', 26'; Lloyd 35'; Mewis 41'; Morgan 84'; Press 88'	Report

Exploria Stadium, Orlando, Florida
Attendance: 3,702
Referee: Marianela Araya Cruz (Costa Rica)

== Goalscorers ==
There were 17 goals scored in 6 matches, for an average of 2.83 goals per match.

3 goals

- (United States) Megan Rapinoe

2 goals

- (Brazil) Debinha
- (United States) Christen Press

1 goal

- (Argentina) Mariana Larroquette
- (Brazil) Adriana
- (Brazil) Geyse
- (Brazil) Julia Bianchi
- (Brazil) Marta
- (Canada) Sarah Stratigakis
- (United States) Rose Lavelle
- (United States) Carli Lloyd
- (United States) Kristie Mewis
- (United States) Alex Morgan
