= 2018 Chicago Red Stars season =

Chicago Red Stars
2018 season
- Owner: Arnim Whisler
- Head coach: Rory Dames
- Stadium: Toyota Park (capacity: 20,000)
- NWSL: 4th
- Top goalscorer: League: Kerr (16); All: Kerr (16)
- Highest home attendance: 13,678 (March 31, vs Portland)
- Lowest home attendance: 2,027 (May 2, vs Orlando)
- Average home league attendance: 4,004
Home colors	Away colors

The 2018 Chicago Red Stars season was the team's tenth season and sixth season in the National Women's Soccer League, the top tier of women's soccer in the United States. For the fourth consecutive season, the team qualified for the post-season playoffs and lost in the semi-final, as they were defeated by the North Carolina Courage 2–0.

== Team roster ==
=== 2018 squad ===
Note: Flags indicate national team as defined under FIFA eligibility rules; some limited exceptions apply. Players may hold more than one non-FIFA nationality.

No.	Pos.	Nation	Player
1	GK	USA	Alyssa Naeher
2	MF	USA	Nikki Stanton
3	DF	USA	Arin Gilliland
4	MF	USA	Alyssa Mautz
5	DF	USA	Katie Naughton
6	DF	USA	Casey Short
8	MF	USA	Julie Ertz
9	FW	USA	Stephanie McCaffrey
10	DF	USA	Vanessa DiBernardo
12	FW	JPN	Yuki Nagasato
13	MF	USA	Morgan Brian
14	DF	USA	Sarah Gorden
15	FW	USA	Michele Vasconcelos

No.	Pos.	Nation	Player
19	MF	USA	Summer Green
20	FW	AUS	Sam Kerr
21	GK	USA	Emily Boyd
22	MF	NZL	Rosie White
23	MF	USA	Brooke Elby
24	MF	USA	Danielle Colaprico
25	MF	USA	Erin Yenney
—	GK	USA	Ryann Torrero
—	DF	MEX	Christina Murillo
—	MF	USA	Jo Boyles
—	MF	USA	Chandra Eigenberger
—	DF	USA	Zoey Goralski

== Player transactions ==
=== College draft ===
Source: National Women's Soccer League

Round	Pick	Nat.	Player	Pos.	Previous Team
Round 2	15	(United States)	Emily Boyd	GK	University of California, Berkeley
Round 2	18	(United States)	Indigo Gibson	D	University of California, Berkeley
Round 2	19	(United States)	Brianna Visalli	M	Pepperdine University
Round 3	24	(United States)	Megan Buckingham	M	University of North Carolina
Round 3	27	(United States)	Zoey Goralski	D	University of California Los Angeles
Round 4	37	(United States)	Alexa Ben	M	DePaul University

=== Transfers in ===
Date	Player	Positions played	Previous club	Fee/notes	Ref.
January 18, 2018	(Australia) Sam Kerr	FW	Sky Blue FC	Acquired in 3-team trade with Sky Blue FC and the Houston Dash.	
January 18, 2018	(United States) Nikki Stanton	MF	Sky Blue FC	Acquired in 3-team trade with Sky Blue FC and the Houston Dash.	
January 30, 2018	(New Zealand) Rosie White	MF	Boston Breakers	Selected with the 7th pick in the Boston Breakers Dispersal Draft	
January 30, 2018	(United States) Ashton Miller	MF	Boston Breakers	Selected with the 12th pick in the Boston Breakers Dispersal Draft	
January 30, 2018	(United States) Joanna Boyles	MF	Boston Breakers	Selected with the 25th pick in the Boston Breakers Dispersal Draft	
June 18, 2018	(United States) Brooke Elby	MF	Utah Royals FC	Acquired in 3-team trade with Utah Royals FC and the Houston Dash.	
June 19, 2018	(United States) Morgan Brian	MF	(France) Olympique Lyonnais	Signed.	

=== Transfer out ===
Date	Player	Positions played	Destination club	Fee/notes	Ref.
January 1, 2018	(United States) Morgan Brian	MF	(France) Olympique Lyonnais	Signed with Olympique Lyonnais, Chicago retained her rights in the NWSL	
January 18, 2018	(United States) Christen Press	FW	Houston Dash	Traded to the Houston Dash as part of a 3-team trade with Sky Blue FC and the Houston Dash.	
January 18, 2018	(United States) Jen Hoy	FW	Sky Blue FC	Traded to Sky Blue FC as part of a 3-team trade with Sky Blue FC and the Houston Dash.	
June 16, 2018	(United States) Lauren Kaskie	MF	(Sweden) Hammarby	Waived, signed with Hammarby	
June 18, 2018	(United States) Samantha Johnson	DF	Utah Royals FC	Traded to Utah Royals FC as part of a 3-team trade with Utah Royals FC and the Houston Dash.	
June 18, 2018	(United States) Sofia Huerta	MF	Houston Dash	Traded to the Houston Dash as part of a 3-team trade with Utah Royals FC and the Houston Dash.	
June 18, 2018	(United States) Taylor Comeau	DF	Houston Dash	Traded to the Houston Dash as part of a 3-team trade with Utah Royals FC and the Houston Dash.	

=== Off-season loans ===
After the 2018 season several Chicago Red Stars players were loaned to clubs of W-League, Australia to play in their 2018-2019 season.

Player	W-League club
Sam Kerr	Perth Glory FC
Nikki Stanton	Perth Glory FC
Alyssa Mautz	Perth Glory FC
Katie Naughton	Perth Glory FC
Danielle Colaprico	Sydney FC
Yuki Nagasato	Brisbane Roar FC

== Management and staff ==
Front office

- Owner: Arnim Whisler

Coaching Staff

- Manager: Rory Dames
- Assistant Coach: Craig Harrington
- Assistant Coach: Gary Curneen
- Goalkeeper Coach: Jordi King
- Strength & Conditioning Coach: Evan Johnson
- Volunteer Assistant Coach: Brian Kibler

== Competitions ==
=== League standing ===
Pos	Team	Pld	W	D	L	GF	GA	GD	Pts	
1	North Carolina Courage (C)	24	17	6	1	53	17	+36	57	NWSL Shield
2	Portland Thorns FC	24	12	6	6	40	28	+12	42	NWSL Playoffs
3	Seattle Reign FC	24	11	8	5	27	19	+8	41	NWSL Playoffs
4	Chicago Red Stars	24	9	10	5	38	28	+10	37	NWSL Playoffs
5	Utah Royals FC	24	9	8	7	22	23	−1	35	
6	Houston Dash	24	9	5	10	35	39	−4	32	
7	Orlando Pride	24	8	6	10	30	37	−7	30	
8	Washington Spirit	24	2	5	17	12	35	−23	11	
9	Sky Blue FC	24	1	6	17	21	52	−31	9	

Source: NWSL
Rules for classification: Tiebreakers
(C) Champions

=== Weekly ranking ===
Week ending	March		April				May				June				July					August				September		
Week ending	X	25	1	15	22	29	6	13	20	27	3	10	17	24	1	8	15	22	29	5	12	19	26	2	9	X
Week	X	1	2	3	4	5	6	7	8	9	10	11	12	13	14	15	16	17	18	19	20	21	22	23	24	X
Rank	X	3	7	4	4	2	3	4	5	6	5	5	6	5	4	4	4	5	5	5	5	4	4	4	4	X
Games	X	1	2	3	5	6	8	9	10	11	12	12	13	14	15	17	18	18	18	18	19	21	22	23	24	X
Points	X	1	1	4	8	9	10	11	12	12	15	15	16	19	22	25	28	28	28	28	29	31	34	37	37	X

Update September 8, 2018 Source: NWSL 2018 season (Note: week ending April 8 had no game scheduled in the league) (Note: week 11, ending June 10, had only one game in the league) (Note: week 18, ending July 29, had one game scheduled in the league but was postponed due to inclement weather)

=== Results summary ===
Overall								Home						Away					
Pld	W	D	L	GF	GA	GD	Pts	W	D	L	GF	GA	GD	W	D	L	GF	GA	GD
24	9	10	5	38	28	+10	37	5	4	3	22	15	+7	4	6	2	16	13	+3

Last updated: September 8, 2018.
Source: NWSLSoccer.com: 2018 Schedule: Chicago Red Stars

=== National Women's Soccer League ===
==== Preseason ====
Sat Feb 24	Marquette Golden Eagles	0–2	Chicago Red Stars	Milwaukee, Wisconsin
14:30 CT				Stadium: Valley Fields; Attendance: Closed-door

Sun Mar 11 Thorns Spring Invitational	Portland Thorns FC	0–1	Chicago Red Stars	Portland, Oregon
7 PM CT			Gilliland 62' (Nagasato)	Stadium: Merlo Field; Attendance: 3,822

Wed Mar 14 Thorns Spring Invitational	Houston Dash	0–1	Chicago Red Stars	Portland, Oregon
15:30 CT			Huerta 9'	Stadium: Merlo Field

Sat Mar 17 Thorns Spring Invitational	United States U-23	1–0	Chicago Red Stars	Portland, Oregon
15:30 CT	Catalina Macario 32' (penalty)			Stadium: Merlo Field

==== Regular season ====
Sat Mar 25 1	Houston Dash	1–1	Chicago Red Stars	Houston, Texas
4 PM CT	Keever 38' (Jordan); Brooks (yellow card) 81'		Naughton (yellow card) 69'; Comeau 90+1' (Colaprico)	Stadium: BBVA Compass Stadium; Attendance: 5,846; Referee: Jasmine Peralta

Sat Mar 31 2	Chicago Red Stars	2–3	Portland Thorns FC	Bridgeview, Illinois
7:15 PM CT	Mautz 31' (Huerta), 67' (Huerta); Colaprico (yellow card) 64'		Horan 9'; Sinclair 40', 65' (pen.); Boureille (yellow card) 58'	Stadium: Toyota Park; Attendance: 13,678; Referee: Greg Dopka

Sat Apr 14 3	Utah Royals FC	0–1	Chicago Red Stars	Sandy, Utah
1:30 PM MT			Colaprico 27'	Stadium: Rio Tinto Stadium; Attendance: 19,203; Referee: Karen Abt
Note: Televised on Lifetime.

Wed Apr 18 4	Chicago Red Stars	3–0	Houston Dash	Bridgeview, Illinois
6:30 PM CT	Mewis 7' (o.g.); Gilliland (yellow card) 9'; Kaskie 11'; Huerta 74' (Colaprico); Johnson (yellow card) 90+2'		Keever (yellow card) 45'; Brooks (yellow card) 82'	Stadium: Toyota Park; Attendance: 2,327; Referee: Ekaterina Koroleva

Sat Apr 21 5	Chicago Red Stars	1–1	Sky Blue FC	Bridgeview, Illinois
7 PM CT	Huerta 1' (Mautz)		McCaskill 78' (Johnson)	Stadium: Toyota Park; Attendance: 2,413; Referee: Reyna Fonseca

Sat Apr 28 6	Washington Spirit	1–1	Chicago Red Stars	Boyds, Maryland
7 PM ET	Ordega 4' (Pugh)		Mautz 20' (yellow card) 56'; Nagasato (yellow card) 83'; Kerr (yellow card) 90+1'	Stadium: Maureen Hendricks Field Maryland SoccerPlex; Attendance: 3,448; Referee: Daniel Gutierrez

Wed May 2 7	Chicago Red Stars	0–2	Orlando Pride	Bridgeview, Illinois
6:30 PM CT	Comeau (yellow card) 87'		Ubogagu 28' (Leroux); Hill 81' (van Egmond)	Stadium: Toyota Park; Attendance: 2,027; Referee: Greg Dopka

Sun May 6 8	North Carolina Courage	1–1	Chicago Red Stars	Cary, North Carolina
3 PM ET	Mewis (yellow card) 45'; Zerboni (yellow card) 71' (goal) 82'		Kerr 37'; Nagasato (yellow card) 45+3'; Vasconcelos (yellow card) 73'	Stadium: Sahlen's Stadium at WakeMed Soccer Park; Attendance: 4,068; Referee: John Krill

Sat May 12 9	Chicago Red Stars	2–2	Houston Dash	Bridgeview, Illinois
7 PM CT	Kerr 20' (Gilliland); Johnson (yellow card) 26'; Comeau (yellow card) 59'; Huerta 68' (penalty)		Daly 6' (Prince); Mewis 48' (Simon); Ohai (yellow card) 89'	Stadium: Toyota Park; Attendance: 2,372; Referee: Danielle Chesky

Sat May 19 10	Seattle Reign FC	0–0	Chicago Red Stars	Seattle, Washington
7 PM PT	McNabb (yellow card) 86'		Stanton (yellow card) 26'; Naughton (yellow card) 46'; Colaprico (yellow card) 90+3'	Stadium: Memorial Stadium; Attendance: 3,597; Referee: Ekaterina Koroleva

Sat May 26 11	Chicago Red Stars	2–5	Orlando Pride	Bridgeview, Illinois
2:30 PM CT	Kerr 21' (Nagasato) 60' (Nagasato); Johnson (yellow card) 42'		Hill 2'; Morgan 6' (Marta); Leroux 62' (Krieger) 64'; Weatherholt 83' (Morgan)	Stadium: Toyota Park; Attendance: 5,047; Referee: Reyna Fonseca

Sat Jun 2 12	Washington Spirit	0–2	Chicago Red Stars	Boyds, Maryland
3:30 PM ET	Lohaman (yellow card) 24'		Kerr 25'; Stantaon (yellow card) 31'; Nagasato 49' (Mautz); Mautz (yellow card) 75'	Stadium: Maureen Hendricks Field Maryland SoccerPlex; Attendance: 3,199; Referee: Karen Abt
Note: game was delayed due to weather

Sat Jun 16 13	Chicago Red Stars	1–1	Portland Thorns FC	Bridgeview, Illinois
7:00 PM CT	Nagasato 43'; Stanton (yellow card) 62'		Hubly (yellow card) 42'; Horan 48' (yellow card) 54'	Stadium: Toyota Park; Attendance: 4,093; Referee: Danielle Chesky
Note: Televised on ESPNews.

Sat Jun 23 14	Chicago Red Stars	2–0	Utah Royals FC	Bridgeview, Illinois
7PM CT	Naughton 62' (Colaprico); DiBernardo 70' (Kerr); Nagasato (yellow card) 87'			Stadium: Toyota Park; Attendance: 3,317; Referee: Natalie Simon

Sun Jul 1 15	Chicago Red Stars	2–0	Washington Spirit	Bridgeview, Illinois
5 PM CT	Short 34' (Colaprico); Nagasato 60' (Kerr); Mautz (yellow card) 65'		Johnson (yellow card) 24'; Hatch (yellow card) 86'	Stadium: Toyota Park; Attendance: 2,858; Referee: Sergii Demianchuk

Wed Jul 4 16	North Carolina Courage	4–1	Chicago Red Stars	Cary, North Carolina
8 PM ET	Dunn 20' (McDonald); Williams 67' (Mathias); Debinha 69' (Mewis); Hamilton 87' (Williams)		Ertz (yellow card) 32'; Nagasato 90+3' (pen.)	Stadium: Sahlen's Stadium at WakeMed Soccer Park; Attendance: 5,295; Referee: Mathew Franz
Note: Match start delayed 1 hour, 50 minutes due to inclement weather.

Sat Jul 7 17	Sky Blue FC	1–3	Chicago Red Stars	Piscataway, New Jersey
3:30 PM ET	Dorsey 73' (McCaskill)		Kerr 40' (Mautz), 46' (Nagasato), 63' (Nagasato)	Stadium: Yurcak Field; Attendance: 2,846; Referee: Jasmine Peralta

Sat Jul 14 18	Chicago Red Stars	1–0	Seattle Reign FC	Bridgeview, Illinois
7 PM CT	Kerr 87' (Nagasato)		Fishlock (yellow card) 35'	Stadium: Toyota Park; Attendance: 3,375; Referee: Natalie Simon

Sat Jul 28	Chicago Red Stars	postponed	Sky Blue FC	Bridgeview, Illinois
7 PM CT				Stadium: Toyota Park
Note: Match postponed due to the cancellation of Sky Blue's flight to Chicago

Fri Aug 10 19	Chicago Red Stars	1–1	North Carolina Courage	Bridgeview, Illinois
7 PM CT	Kerr 64' (DiBernardo); Nagasato (yellow card) 72'		Debinha 21' (McDonald); Hamilton (yellow card) 87'	Stadium: Toyota Park; Attendance: 3,567; Referee: Matthew Franz

Wed Aug 15 20	Seattle Reign FC	0–0	Chicago Red Stars	Seattle, Washington
7:30 PM PT	Oyster (yellow card) 47'	boxscore	Kerr (yellow card) 27'; Colaprico (yellow card) 44'; Gilliland (yellow card) 75'	Stadium: Memorial Stadium; Attendance: 3,341; Referee: Lukasz Szpala

Sat Aug 18 21	Portland Thorns FC	2–2	Chicago Red Stars	Portland, Oregon
7:30 PM PT	Heath 60'; Sonnett (yellow card) 67'; Sinclair 69' (Heath)		Kerr 44' (Nagasato), 49' (DiBernardo); White (yellow card) 81'	Stadium: Providence Park; Attendance: 18,631; Referee: Malik Badawi
Note: Televised on ESPNews

Sat Aug 25 22	Orlando Pride	1–3	Chicago Red Stars	Orlando, Florida
3:30 PM ET	Camila (yellow card) 42'; Morgan 65' (Marta); Zadorsky (yellow card) 79'; Monica (yellow card) 82'		Kerr 44' (Nagasato), 59'; DiBernardo 45+1' (Kerr)	Stadium: Orlando City Stadium; Attendance: 5,016; Referee: Guido Gonzales Jr

Tue Sept 4 23	Chicago Red Stars	5–0	Sky Blue FC	Bridgeview, Illinois
6:30 PM CT	Mautz 18' (Gilliland), 46' (Gilliland); Kerr 64' (Elby); White 80' (Kerr); Vasconcelos 90+7' (White)	boxscore		Stadium: Toyota Park; Attendance: 2,974; Referee: Ismir Pekmic
Note: Match was originally scheduled for July 28th, was postponed due to the cancellation of Sky Blue's flight to Chicago.

Sat Sep 8 24	Utah Royals FC	2–1	Chicago Red Stars	Sandy, Utah
1:30 PM MT	Rodriguez 55' (Bowen); Stengel 64' (Lytle)		Gilliland (yellow card) 17'; Stanton (yellow card) 25'; Kerr 39' (Gilliland)	Stadium: Rio Tinto Stadium; Attendance: 11,851; Referee: Rosendo Mendoza

==== Postseason ====
Tue Sep 18 Semifinal	North Carolina Courage	2–0	Chicago Red Stars	Portland, Oregon
6:00 PM PT	McDonald 5' (Dunn); Mathias (yellow card) 72'; Mewis 86' (Dunn)			Stadium: Providence Park; Attendance: 4,646; Referee: Timothy Ford
Note: Televised on ESPNews. Due to the impending arrival of Hurricane Florence, the league rescheduled the Courage-Red Stars semifinal for September 18 in Portland.

== Honors and awards ==
=== NWSL annual awards ===
Award	Result	Player
Golden Boot	winner	Sam Kerr
Most Valuable Player	finalist	Sam Kerr
Defender of the Year	finalist	Julie Ertz

NWSL Best XI
Position	First team	Position	Second team
Forward	Sam Kerr	Defender	Julie Ertz

=== NWSL Player of the Month ===
Month	Result	Player	Ref.
April	Won	(United States) Sofia Huerta	
August	Won	(Australia) Sam Kerr	

=== NWSL Team of the Month ===
Month	Goalkeeper	Defenders	Midfielders	Forwards	Ref
April			(United States) Sofia Huerta		
May					
June	(United States) Alyssa Naeher		(Japan) Yuki Nagasato		
July		(United States) Katie Naughton	(Japan) Yuki Nagasato	(Australia) Sam Kerr	
August			(United States) Vanessa DiBernardo	(Australia) Sam Kerr	

=== NWSL Player of the Week ===
Week	Result	Player	Ref
4	Won	(United States) Sofia Huerta	
6	Won	(United States) Alyssa Naeher	
10	Won	(Japan) Yuki Nagasato	
15	Won	(Australia) Sam Kerr	
22	Won	(Australia) Sam Kerr	

=== NWSL Goal of the Week ===
Week	Result	Player	Ref.
2	Nominated	(United States) Alyssa Mautz	
3	Nominated	(United States) Danielle Colaprico	
4	Nominated	(United States) Sofia Huerta	
6	Nominated	(Australia) Samantha Kerr	
10	Nominated	(Japan) Yuki Nagasato	
13	Nominated	(United States) Vanessa DiBernardo	
14	Nominated	(Japan) Yuki Nagasato	
15	Nominated	(Australia) Samantha Kerr	
16	Nominated	(Australia) Samantha Kerr	
20	Nominated	(Australia) Samantha Kerr	
21	Nominated	(Australia) Samantha Kerr	
22	Nominated	(Australia) Samantha Kerr	

=== NWSL Save of the Week ===
Week	Result	Player	Ref.
1	Nominated	(United States) Alyssa Naeher	
3	Nominated	(United States) Alyssa Naeher	
4	Nominated	(United States) Alyssa Naeher	
6	Won	(United States) Alyssa Naeher	
8	Nominated	(United States) Alyssa Naeher	
10	Nominated	(United States) Emily Boyd	
11/12	Nominated	(United States) Alyssa Naeher	
15	Nominated	(United States) Alyssa Naeher	
16	Nominated	(United States) Alyssa Naeher	
24	Nominated	(United States) Alyssa Naeher	
