= 2019 Houston Dash season =

Houston Dash
2019 season
- Head coach: James Clarkson
- Stadium: BBVA Stadium
- NWSL: 7th
- Highest home attendance: 5,327 (July 13th vs. Chicago Red Stars)
- Lowest home attendance: 2,933 (April 28th vs. North Carolina Courage)
- Average home league attendance: 4,053
- Biggest win: 1–0 (four games)
- Biggest defeat: 0-5 (July 24th vs. Portland Thorns FC)
| Home colors | Away colors |

The 2019 Houston Dash season was the team's sixth season as an American professional women's soccer team in the National Women's Soccer League. James Clarkson was appointed head coach on December 11, 2018 after Vera Pauw departed the team after only one season.

== Roster ==
As of August 21, 2019.

Note: Flags indicate national team as defined under FIFA eligibility rules; some limited exceptions apply. Players may hold more than one non-FIFA nationality.

| No. | Pos. | Nation | Player |
|---|---|---|---|
| 1 | GK | USA | Jane Campbell |
| 2 | DF | MEX | Arianna Romero |
| 3 | FW | ENG | Rachel Daly |
| 4 | DF | CAN | Allysha Chapman |
| 6 | MF | USA | Mana Shim |
| 7 | FW | USA | Kealia Ohai |
| 9 | MF | USA | Haley Hanson |
| 10 | MF | USA | Christine Nairn |
| 11 | MF | USA | Sofia Huerta |
| 12 | MF | USA | Veronica Latsko |
| 13 | MF | CAN | Sophie Schmidt |
| 14 | FW | CAN | Nichelle Prince |
| 15 | FW | USA | CeCe Kizer |
| 16 | FW | JAM | Kayla McCoy |

| No. | Pos. | Nation | Player |
|---|---|---|---|
| 17 | FW | AUS | Kyah Simon |
| 18 | GK | CAN | Devon Kerr |
| 19 | MF | USA | Kristie Mewis |
| 20 | DF | CAN | Lindsay Agnew |
| 21 | DF | USA | Ally Haran |
| 22 | DF | USA | Amber Brooks |
| 23 | DF | USA | Ally Prisock |
| 24 | FW | USA | Jamia Fields |
| 25 | FW | MEX | Ariana Calderón |
| 27 | DF | USA | Betsy Brandon |
| 28 | MF | USA | Cami Privett |
| 30 | GK | MEX | Bianca Henninger |
| 34 | DF | USA | Jazmin Jackmon |
| 44 | DF | ENG | Satara Murray |

== Competitions ==
=== Regular season ===
| April 14, 2019 1 | Houston Dash | 1–1 | Reign FC | Houston, Texas |
| 15:00 | Prince 10'; Schmidt (yellow card) 67'; Nairn (yellow card) 90+3' | Box; Report | Jenkins 58'; McNabb (yellow card) 79' | Stadium: BBVA Compass Stadium; Attendance: 4,335 |

| April 20, 2019 2 | Sky Blue FC | 0–1 | Houston Dash | Piscataway, New Jersey |
| 17:00 | Lloyd (yellow card) 80' | Report | Agnew (yellow card) 49'; Huerta 83' | Stadium: Yurcak Field; Attendance: 1,394 |

| April 28, 2019 3 | Houston Dash | 1–4 | North Carolina Courage | Houston, Texas |
| 17:00 | Daly 86'; Schmidt (yellow card) 44' | Report | Williams 45+1'; Dunn 69'; Debinha 69'; Pruitt 76' | Stadium: BBVA Compass Stadium; Attendance: 2,933 |

| May 5, 2019 4 | Houston Dash | 1–0 | Orlando Pride | Houston, Texas |
| 17:00 | Kealia Ohai 7' | Report | Marta (yellow card) 90+2' | Stadium: BBVA Compass Stadium; Attendance: 4,173; Referee: Victor Rivas |

| May 11, 2019 5 | Utah Royals FC | 1–2 | Houston Dash | Sandy, Utah |
| 7:00 pm MST | Rodriguez 29'; S. Johnson (yellow card) 44'; Corsie (yellow card) 69' | Report | Daly 42', 50'; Hanson (yellow card) 72'; Nairn (yellow card) 83' | Stadium: Rio Tinto Stadium; Referee: 10,138 |

| May 19, 2019 6 | Houston Dash | 1–2 | Chicago Red Stars | Houston, Texas |
| 17:00 | Huerta 26'; Murray (yellow card) 54' | Box | Kerr 8', 13'; Stanton (yellow card) 49' | Stadium: BBVA Compass Stadium; Attendance: 3,690 |

| June 2, 2019 7 | Reign FC | 1–1 | Houston Dash | Tacoma, Washington |
| 15:00 | Balcer 32'; Groom (yellow card) 45+3' | Box | Prisock (yellow card) 66'; Nairn 90' | Stadium: Cheney Stadium; Attendance: 3,063 |

| June 15, 2019 8 | Houston Dash | 2–2 | Orlando Pride | Houston, Texas |
| 19:30 | Brooks (yellow card) 11'; Huerta 47'; Mewis 67' | Box | Boyles 13'; Reid (yellow card) 29'; Viggiano (yellow card) 66'; Evans 71'; Greening (yellow card) 84' | Stadium: BBVA Stadium; Attendance: 3,776 |

| June 22, 2019 9 | Washington Spirit | 0–0 | Houston Dash | Boyds, Maryland |
| 18:00 | | Box | Nairn (yellow card) 44'; Calderón (yellow card) 73' | Stadium: Maryland SoccerPlex; Attendance: 2,367 |

| June 29, 2019 10 | Houston Dash | 1–2 | Portland Thorns FC | Houston, Texas |
| 19:30 | Simon 51'; Murray (yellow card) 75' | Report | Ball (yellow card) 60'; Lussi 70'; Purce 75' | Stadium: BBVA Stadium; Attendance: 3,379 |

| July 5, 2019 11 | North Carolina Courage | 5–2 | Houston Dash | Cary, North Carolina |
| 18:00 | Hamilton 5', 18', 54', 71'; Williams 31' | Box | Mewis 24'; Simon 43'; Schmidt (yellow card) 53'; Hanson (yellow card) 69' | Stadium: WakeMed Soccer Park; Attendance: 5,066 |

| July 13, 2019 12 | Houston Dash | 0–1 | Chicago Red Stars | Houston, Texas |
| 19:30 | Hanson (yellow card) 77' | Report | Johnson 7'; Stanton (yellow card) 66' | Stadium: BBVA Stadium; Attendance: 5,327 |

| July 20, 2019 13 | Washington Spirit | 1–2 | Houston Dash | Boyds, Maryland |
| 18:00 | DiBiasi 53'; Hatch (yellow card) 77' | Report | Mewis 56'; Huerta (yellow card) 70'; Brooks 72'; Nairn (yellow card) 88' | Stadium: Maryland SoccerPlex; Attendance: 5,500 |

| July 24, 2019 14 | Portland Thorns FC | 5–0 | Houston Dash | Portland, Oregon |
| 21:30 | Horan 7'; Raso 12', 23'; Sinclair 18' (pen.); Campbell 71' (o.g.) | Report | Chapman (yellow card) 70' | Stadium: Providence Park; Attendance: 22,329 |

| July 28, 2019 15 | Houston Dash | 1–0 | Sky Blue FC | Houston, Texas |
| 18:00 | Daly 22' | Report | Dorsey (yellow card) 68' | Stadium: BBVA Stadium; Attendance: 3,510 |

| August 2, 2019 16 | Houston Dash | 0–1 | Reign FC | Houston, Texas |
| 18:00 | Nairn (yellow card) 90+5' | Report | White 21'; Jenkins (yellow card) 80'; Murphy (yellow card) 85' | Stadium: BBVA Stadium; Attendance: 3,621 |

| August 10, 2019 17 | Orlando Pride | 0–1 | Houston Dash | Orlando, Florida |
| 18:30 | King (red card) 61'; Marta (yellow card) 64' (red card) 85'; Emslie (yellow card) 90+2' | Report | Kizer (yellow card) 82'; Ohai (yellow card) 87'; Daly 87' (pen.) | Stadium: Exploria Stadium; Attendance: 5,106 |

| August 24, 2019 18 | Houston Dash | 1–2 | Sky Blue FC | Houston, Texas |
| 19:30 | Ohai 90+4' | Report | Dydasco (yellow card) 9'; Lloyd 26', 41'; Skroski (yellow card) 34'; Lewandowski (yellow card) 49'; Sheridan (yellow card) 83' | Stadium: BBVA Stadium; Attendance: 4,102 |

| September 8, 2019 19 | Chicago Red Stars | 3–0 | Houston Dash | Bridgeview, Illinois |
| 17:00 | Kerr 7', 44'; McCaskill 65'; Nagasato (yellow card) 90' | Report | Agnew (yellow card) 40' | Stadium: SeatGeek Stadium; Attendance: 3,345 |

| September 13, 2019 20 | Houston Dash | 2–1 | Utah Royals FC | Houston, Texas |
| 19:30 | Huerta 27', 62'; Nairn (yellow card) 87' | Report | Jónsdóttir 75' | Stadium: BBVA Compass Stadium; Attendance: 4,538 |

| September 17, 2019 21 | North Carolina Courage | 1–0 | Houston Dash | Cary, North Carolina |
| 18:30 | Mewis 87' (pen.) | Report | Daly (yellow card) 73'; Brooks (yellow card) 74'; Mewis (yellow card) 86' | Stadium: Sahlen's Stadium at WakeMed Soccer Park; Attendance: 4,943 |

| September 21, 2019 22 | Portland Thorns FC | 1–0 | Houston Dash | Portland, Oregon |
| 21:30 | Heath 48' | Report | | Stadium: Providence Park; Attendance: 21,022 |

| September 25, 2019 23 | Houston Dash | 0–0 | Washington Spirit | Houston, Texas |
| 19:30 | Chapman (yellow card) 44' | Report | Staab (yellow card) 12'; Nielsen (yellow card) 66' | Stadium: BBVA Stadium; Attendance: 5,247 |

| October 12, 2019 24 | Utah Royals FC | 2-1 | Houston Dash | Sandy, Utah |
| 19:30 | Press 3'; Rodriguez 23'; Weber (yellow card) 70' | Report | Schmidt (yellow card) 26'; Romero (yellow card) 29'; Daly (yellow card) 70'; Mewis 78' | Stadium: Rio Tinto Stadium; Attendance: 9,513 |

==== Regular-season standings ====
| Pos | Team | Pld | W | D | L | GF | GA | GD | Pts | Qualification |
|---|---|---|---|---|---|---|---|---|---|---|
| 1 | North Carolina Courage (C) | 24 | 15 | 4 | 5 | 54 | 23 | +31 | 49 | NWSL Shield |
| 2 | Chicago Red Stars | 24 | 14 | 2 | 8 | 41 | 28 | +13 | 44 | NWSL Playoffs |
| 3 | Portland Thorns FC | 24 | 11 | 7 | 6 | 40 | 31 | +9 | 40 | NWSL Playoffs |
| 4 | Reign FC | 24 | 10 | 8 | 6 | 27 | 27 | 0 | 38 | NWSL Playoffs |
| 5 | Washington Spirit | 24 | 9 | 7 | 8 | 30 | 25 | +5 | 34 | |
| 6 | Utah Royals FC | 24 | 10 | 4 | 10 | 25 | 25 | 0 | 34 | |
| 7 | Houston Dash | 24 | 7 | 5 | 12 | 21 | 36 | −15 | 26 | |
| 8 | Sky Blue FC | 24 | 5 | 5 | 14 | 20 | 34 | −14 | 20 | |
| 9 | Orlando Pride | 24 | 4 | 4 | 16 | 24 | 53 | −29 | 16 | |

Source: NWSL
Rules for classification: Tiebreakers
(C) Champions

===== Results summary =====
| Overall | | | | | | | | Home | | | | | | Away | | | | | |
| Pld | W | D | L | GF | GA | GD | Pts | W | D | L | GF | GA | GD | W | D | L | GF | GA | GD |
|---|---|---|---|---|---|---|---|---|---|---|---|---|---|---|---|---|---|---|---|
| 23 | 7 | 5 | 11 | 20 | 34 | −14 | 26 | 4 | 3 | 6 | 13 | 17 | −4 | 3 | 2 | 5 | 7 | 17 | −10 |

Last updated: September 25, 2019.
Source: NWSLsoccer.com

===== Results by round =====
| Round | 1 | 2 | 3 | 4 | 5 | 6 | 7 | 8 | 9 | 10 | 11 | 12 | 13 | 14 | 15 | 16 | 17 | 18 | 19 | 20 | 21 | 22 | 23 | 24 |
|---|---|---|---|---|---|---|---|---|---|---|---|---|---|---|---|---|---|---|---|---|---|---|---|---|
| Stadium | H | A | H | H | A | H | A | H | A | H | A | H | A | A | H | H | A | A | H | A | H | A | H | A |
| Result | D | W | L | W | W | L | D | D | D | L | L | L | W | L | W | L | W | L | L | W | L | L | D | L |
| Position | 6 | 5 | 5 | 3 | 1 | 3 | 6 | 5 | 5 | 7 | 7 | 7 | 7 | 7 | 6 | 7 | 6 | 7 | 7 | 7 | 7 | 7 | 7 | 7 |

Source: NWSLsoccer.com
A = Away; H = Home; W = Win; D = Draw; L = Loss

== Statistical leaders ==
=== Top scorers ===
| Rank | Player | Goals |
|---|---|---|
| 1 | (England) Rachel Daly | 5 |
| 1 | (United States) Sofia Huerta | 5 |
| 3 | (United States) Kristie Mewis | 4 |
| 4 | (Australia) Kyah Simon | 2 |
| 4 | (United States) Kealia Ohai | 2 |
| 6 | (Canada) Nichelle Prince | 1 |
| 6 | (United States) Christine Nairn | 1 |
| 6 | (United States) Amber Brooks | 1 |

=== Top assists ===
| Rank | Player | Assists |
|---|---|---|
| 1 | (United States) Sofia Huerta | 4 |
| 2 | (Australia) Kyah Simon | 2 |
| 2 | (United States) Christine Nairn | 2 |
| 4 | (Canada) Sophie Schmidt | 1 |
| 4 | (Mexico) Arianna Romero | 1 |
| 4 | (United States) Kealia Ohai | 1 |
| 4 | (United States) Kristie Mewis | 1 |
| 4 | (England) Rachel Daly | 1 |
| 4 | (Mexico) Ariana Calderón | 1 |

=== Shutouts ===
| Rank | Player | Clean sheets |
|---|---|---|
| 1 | (United States) Jane Campbell | 6 |

== Awards ==
As of October 10, 2019.

=== NWSL Weekly Awards ===
==== NWSL Goal of the Week ====
| Week | Result | Player | Ref. |
|---|---|---|---|
| 1 | Nominated | (Canada) Nichelle Prince | |
| 4 | Won | (United States) Kealia Ohai | |
| 8 | Nominated | (United States) Christine Nairn | |
| 19 | Won | (United States) Kealia Ohai | |

==== NWSL Save of the Week ====
| Week | Result | Player | Ref. |
|---|---|---|---|
| 1 | Nominated | (United States) Jane Campbell | |
| 3 | Nominated | (United States) Jane Campbell | |
| 8 | Won | (United States) Jane Campbell | |
| 14 | Nominated | (United States) Jane Campbell | |
| 15 | Won | (United States) Jane Campbell | |
| 19 | Nominated | (United States) Jane Campbell | |
| 21 | Nominated | (United States) Jane Campbell | |
| 22 | Nominated | (United States) Jane Campbell | |
| 23 | Nominated | (United States) Jane Campbell | |
| 24 | Nominated | (United States) Jane Campbell | |
| 25 | Nominated | (United States) Jane Campbell | |

== Player Transactions ==
=== 2019 NWSL College Draft ===
Source: National Women's Soccer League

| Round | Pick | Nat. | Player | Pos. | Previous Team |
|---|---|---|---|---|---|
| Round 2 | 12 | (United States) | Ally Prisock | D | University of Southern California |
| Round 2 | 13 | (United States) | CeCe Kizer | F | Mississippi |
| Round 2 | 16 | (United States) | Betsy Brandon | M | University of Virginia |
| Round 2 | 18 | (Jamaica) | Kayla McCoy | F | Duke University |
| Round 3 | 21 | (United States) | Jazmin Jackmon | D | University of Oregon |
| Round 3 | 22 | (United States) | Grace Cutler | M | West Virginia University |

=== In ===
| Date | Player | Positions played | Previous club | Fee/notes | Ref. |
|---|---|---|---|---|---|
| February 26, 2019 | (United States) Christine Nairn | MF | Orlando Pride | Acquired in Trade with the Orlando Pride for a third and fourth pick in the 2020 NWSL draft. | |
| March 4, 2019 | (Mexico) Arianna Romero | DF | (Iceland) Valur | Signed | |
| March 4, 2019 | (England) Satara Murray | DF | (England) Liverpool F.C. Women | Signed | |
| March 12, 2019 | (Canada) Sophie Schmidt | MF | unattached | Signed | |
| April 13, 2019 | (United States) Jamia Fields | FW | (Norway) Avaldsnes IL | Signed | |
| April 13, 2019 | (Canada) Devon Kerr | GK | Ohio State University | Signed | |

=== Out ===
| Date | Player | Positions played | Destination club | Fee/notes | Ref. |
|---|---|---|---|---|---|
| October 1, 2018 | (South Africa) Janine Van Wyk | DF | unattached | Waived | |
| October 1, 2018 | (United States) Michaela Hahn | MF | | Retired | |
| February 5, 2019 | (South Africa) Thembi Kgatlana | FW | (China) Beijing BG Phoenix F.C. | Waived | |
| February 5, 2019 | (South Africa) Linda Motlhalo | MF | (China) Beijing BG Phoenix F.C. | Waived | |
| March 4, 2019 | (United States) Sammy Jo Prudhomme | GK | Washington Spirit | Waived | |
| March 4, 2019 | (United States) Savannah Jordan | FW | | Retired | |
| March 4, 2019 | (United States) Kimberly Keever | FW | | Departed team | |
| June 19, 2019 | (United States) Taylor Comeau | DF | | Retired | |
| August 21, 2019 | (Australia) Clare Polkinghorne | DF | | Family reasons | |

== See also ==
- 2019 National Women's Soccer League season
- 2019 in American soccer
