= 2018 Houston Dash season =

Houston Dash
2018 season
- Managing Director: Brian Ching
- Head coach: Vera Pauw
- Stadium: BBVA Compass Stadium
Home colors	Away colors

The 2018 Houston Dash season was the team's fifth season as an American professional women's soccer team in the National Women's Soccer League. Before the start of the 2018 season Vera Pauw was appointed as head coach.

== Team information ==
=== Rosters ===
Players and squad numbers last updated on June 20, 2018.
Note: Flags indicate national team as has been defined under FIFA eligibility rules. Players may hold more than one non-FIFA nationality.

No.	Name	Country	Position	Date of birth (age)
Goalkeepers
1	Jane Campbell	United States	GK	February 17, 1995 (age 31)
30	Bianca Henninger	Mexico	GK	October 22, 1990 (age 35)
16	Sammy Jo Prudhomme	United States	GK	October 25, 1993 (age 32)
Defenders
22	Amber Brooks	United States	DF	January 23, 1991 (age 35)
55	Janine van Wyk	South Africa	DF	April 17, 1987 (age 39)
4	Allysha Chapman	Canada	DF	January 25, 1989 (age 37)
8	Clare Polkinghorne	Australia	DF	February 1, 1989 (age 37)
18	Kimberly Keever	United States	DF	September 22, 1995 (age 30)
Midfielders
19	Kristie Mewis	United States	MF	February 25, 1991 (age 35)
6	Meleana Shim	United States	MF	September 25, 1991 (age 34)
21	Taylor Comeau	United States	MF	July 21, 1993 (age 33)
9	Haley Hanson	United States	MF	February 22, 1996 (age 30)
10	Linda Motlhalo	South Africa	MF	July 1, 1998 (age 28)
23	Sofia Huerta	United States	MF	December 14, 1992 (age 33)
Forwards
3	Rachel Daly	England	FW	December 6, 1991 (age 34)
7	Kealia Ohai	United States	FW	January 31, 1992 (age 34)
14	Nichelle Prince	Canada	FW	February 19, 1995 (age 31)
20	Lindsay Agnew	Canada	FW	March 31, 1995 (age 31)
13	Savannah Jordan	United States	FW	January 24, 1995 (age 31)
11	Thembi Kgatlana	South Africa	FW	May 2, 1996 (age 30)
12	Veronica Latsko	United States	FW	December 12, 1995 (age 30)
17	Kyah Simon	Australia	FW	June 25, 1991 (age 35)

== Competitions ==
=== League standings ===
Pos	Team	Pld	W	D	L	GF	GA	GD	Pts	
1	North Carolina Courage (C)	24	17	6	1	53	17	+36	57	NWSL Shield
2	Portland Thorns FC	24	12	6	6	40	28	+12	42	NWSL Playoffs
3	Seattle Reign FC	24	11	8	5	27	19	+8	41	NWSL Playoffs
4	Chicago Red Stars	24	9	10	5	38	28	+10	37	NWSL Playoffs
5	Utah Royals FC	24	9	8	7	22	23	−1	35	
6	Houston Dash	24	9	5	10	35	39	−4	32	
7	Orlando Pride	24	8	6	10	30	37	−7	30	
8	Washington Spirit	24	2	5	17	12	35	−23	11	
9	Sky Blue FC	24	1	6	17	21	52	−31	9	

Source: NWSL
Rules for classification: Tiebreakers
(C) Champions

=== Results by round ===
Round	1	2	3	4	5	6	7	8	9	10	11	12	13	14	15	16	17	18	19	20	21	22	23	24
Stadium	H	H	A	A	H	A	H	A	A	H	H	H	H	A	A	H	A	A	H	A	H	A	H	A
Result	D	D	L	L	L	W	D	D	L	W	W	D	L	W	L	W	L	W	L	W	W	L	W	L
Position (Note: HOU's position at the end of the matchweek, not their match.)	5	6	7	8	8	8	7	7	7	7	5	7	7	7	7	7	7	6	7	7	7	7	6	6

Updated to match(es) played on September 8, 2018. Source: NWSLsoccer.com
A = Away; H = Home; W = Win; D = Draw; L = Loss

=== Matches ===
==== Pre-season and friendlies ====
Mar 2	Texas A&M	0–1	Houston Dash	College Station
		Report	Heap 87'	Stadium: Ellis Field (Texas A&M)

Mar 11 Thorns Spring Invitational	United States U-23	1–2	Houston Dash	Portland, Oregon
1:30 PM CDT		Report	Latsko 17'; Brooks 55'	Stadium: Merlo Field

Mar 14 Thorns Spring Invitational	Chicago Red Stars	1–0	Houston Dash	Portland, Oregon
3:30 PM CDT	Huerta 9'			Stadium: Merlo Field

Mar 17 Thorns Spring Invitational	Portland Thorns FC	0–0	Houston Dash	Portland, Oregon
9:30 PM CDT		Report		Stadium: Merlo Field; Attendance: 3,119

==== Regular season ====
Sun 25 Mar 2018 1	Houston Dash	1–1	Chicago Red Stars	Houston, Texas
4 PM CT	Keever 38' (Jordan); Brooks (yellow card) 81'	Report	Naughton (yellow card) 69'; Comeau 90+1' (Colaprico)	Stadium: BBVA Compass Stadium; Attendance: 5,846

Fri 30 Mar 2018 2	Houston Dash	0–0	Utah Royals FC	Houston, Texas
7 PM CT		Report		Stadium: BBVA Compass Stadium; Attendance: 3,433

Wed 18 Apr 2018 3	Chicago Red Stars	3–0	Houston Dash	Bridgeview, Illinois
6:30 PM CT	Mewis 7' (o.g.); Gilliland (yellow card) 9'; Kaskie 11'; Huerta 74' (Colaprico); Johnson (yellow card) 90+2'	Report	Keever (yellow card) 45'; Brooks (yellow card) 82'	Stadium: Toyota Park; Attendance: 2,327

Sun 22 Apr 2018 4	Orlando Pride	1–0	Houston Dash	Orlando, Florida
5 PM ET	Ubogagu 65' (Nairn)	Report		Stadium: Orlando City Stadium; Attendance: 3,890

Sat 28 Apr 2018 5	Houston Dash	0–2	North Carolina Courage	Houston, Texas
2:30 PM CT		Report	Dunn 3' (McDonald); Hamilton 48' (O'Sullivan); Mathias (yellow card) 44'	Stadium: BBVA Compass Stadium
Note: Televised on Lifetime.

Sat 5 May 2018 6	Sky Blue FC	2–3	Houston Dash	Piscataway, New Jersey
7 PM ET	Johnson 57' (Groom), 73' (Killion); McCaskill (yellow card) 64'	Report	Prince 24' (Agnew); Daly 59' (Ohai) (yellow card) 84'; Latsko 79' (Kgatlana)	Stadium: Yurcak Field; Attendance: 2,065

Wed 9 May 2018 7	Houston Dash	1–1	Portland Thorns FC	Houston, Texas
7 PM ET	Simon 57' (Latsko); Van Wyk (yellow card) 90+1'	Report	Crnogorčević 25' (Sinclair)	Stadium: BBVA Compass Stadium; Attendance: 2,668

Sat 12 May 2018 8	Chicago Red Stars	2–2	Houston Dash	Bridgeview, Illinois
7 PM CT	Kerr 20' (Gilliland); Johnson (yellow card) 26'; Comeau (yellow card) 59'; Huerta 65' (pen.)	Report	Daly 6' (Prince); Mewis 48' (Simon); Ohai (yellow card) 89'	Stadium: Toyota Park; Attendance: 2,372; Referee: Danielle Chesky

Sat 19 May 2018 9	Utah Royals FC	1–0	Houston Dash	Sandy, Utah
1:30 PM MT	Elby (yellow card) 9'; Tymrak 51' (Jonsdottir); Matheson (yellow card) 55'	Report	Daly (yellow card) 12'	Stadium: Rio Tinto Stadium; Attendance: 8,323; Referee: Eric Tattersall
Note: Televised on Lifetime.

Wed 23 May 2018 10	Houston Dash	2–1	Seattle Reign FC	Houston, Texas
7 PM CT	Mewis 68'; Latsko 90+2' (Kgatlana)	Report	Yanez 13' (Taylor); McNabb (yellow card) 67'	Stadium: BBVA Compass Stadium; Attendance: 2,376

Sun 27 May 2018 11	Houston Dash	3–2	Washington Spirit	Houston, Texas
5 PM CT	Daly 45+1' (Prince), 78' (Kgatlana) (yellow card) 90+2'; Ohai 46'	Report	Dougherty Howard (yellow card) 5'; Ordega (yellow card) 45+2'; Banini; Hatch 90+1'	Stadium: BBVA Compass Stadium; Attendance: 4,045

Sun 3 Jun 2018 12	Houston Dash	1–1	North Carolina Courage	Houston, Texas
7:30 PM CT	Ohai 49' (Campbell); Daly (yellow card) 68'; Kgatlana (yellow card) 90+3'	Report	Williams (yellow card) 45+1'; Crouse 80'	Stadium: BBVA Compass Stadium; Attendance: 2,941; Referee: Natalie Simon

Fri 22 Jun 2018 13	Houston Dash	1–3	Portland Thorns FC	Houston, Texas
7:30 PM CT	Huerta 12'; Simon (yellow card) 85'	Report	Heath 9' (Sinclair); Crnogorčević 33'; Sinclair 83' (Lussi)	Stadium: BBVA Compass Stadium; Attendance: 3,480

Wed 27 Jun 2018 14	Orlando Pride	1–2	Houston Dash	Orlando, Florida
7:30 PM	Morgan 22' (Zadorsky); Pickett (yellow card) 90'; Monica (yellow card) 90+1'; Nairn (yellow card) 90+1'; Leroux (yellow card) 90+3'	Report	Chapman (yellow card) 75'; Ohai 79' (Motlhalo); Huerta 83' (pen.)	Stadium: Orlando City Stadium; Attendance: 3,215

Sat 7 Jul 2018 15	Seattle Reign FC	3–1	Houston Dash	Seattle, Washington
7 PM PT	Taylor 37' (Rapinoe); Rapinoe 56' (pen.); Long 85' (Rapinoe); Rapinoe (yellow card) 90+4'	Report	Brooks 12' (Huerta); Chapman (yellow card) 59'	Stadium: Memorial Stadium; Attendance: 3,172

Wed 11 Jul 2018 16	Houston Dash	3–1	Orlando Pride	Houston, Texas
7:30 PM CT	Daly 17' (Ohai), 50'; Hanson (yellow card) 90+1'; Kgatlana 90+5' (Chapman)	Report	Leroux 55' (Zadorsky); Ubogagu (yellow card) 80'; Zadorsky (yellow card) 87'; Marta (red card) 90+6'	Stadium: BBVA Compass Stadium; Attendance: 3,308

Sun 15 Jul 2018 17	Portland Thorns FC	3–1	Houston Dash	Portland, Oregon
8 PM PT	Horan 16' (Sonnett), 31'; Crnogorčević 48' (Raso)	Report	Ohai 37'	Stadium: Providence Park; Attendance: 15,327; Referee: Eric Tattersall

Sun 22 Jul 2018 18	Washington Spirit	0–1	Houston Dash	Boyds, Maryland
10 AM ET		Report	Daly 3' (Huerta)	Stadium: Maryland SoccerPlex; Attendance: 3,623
Note: Game was originally scheduled for July 21, was rescheduled due to poor weather conditions

Sun 5 Aug 2018 19	Houston Dash	1–2	Utah Royals FC	Houston, Texas
7:30 PM CT	Latsko 41' (Huerta); Huerta (yellow card) 48'	Report	Press 77'; Stengel 83' (Tymrak)	Stadium: BBVA Compass Stadium; Attendance: 3,907

Sat 11 Aug 2018 20	Sky Blue FC	1–2	Houston Dash	Piscataway, New Jersey
7 PM ET	Tiernan 64'	Report	Daly 7' (Ohai), 73' (pen.)	Stadium: Yurcak Field; Attendance: 2,126

Fri 17 Aug 2018 21	Houston Dash	4–0	Washington Spirit	Houston, Texas
7:30 PM CT	Ohai 42' (Daly); Huerta 58' (Comeau), 76' (Daly); Simon 84' (Latsko)	Report		Stadium: BBVA Compass Stadium; Attendance: 3,007

Tue 21 Aug 2018 22	Seattle Reign FC	2–0	Houston Dash	Seattle, Washington
7:30 PM PT	Oyster (yellow card) 28'; Taylor 58' (Nielsen), 61' (Rapinoe)	Box; Report	Brooks (yellow card) 83'	Stadium: Memorial Stadium; Attendance: 3,193

Sat 25 Aug 2018 23	Houston Dash	6–1	Sky Blue FC	Houston, Texas
7:30 PM CT	Motlhalo 22'; Latsko 48' (Huerta); Huerta 65' (Ohai); Daly 67' (pen.); Hanson 88' (Simon); Kgatlana 90' (Hanson)	Report	Dorsey 54'	Stadium: BBVA Compass Stadium; Attendance: 4,257

Sat 8 Sep 2018 24	North Carolina Courage	5–0	Houston Dash	Cary, North Carolina
7 PM ET	Jessica McDonald 13' (Erceg); Crystal Dunn 26'; Williams 44' (McDonald), 57' (McDonald); Hamilton 70'	Report		Stadium: Sahlen's Stadium at WakeMed Soccer Park; Attendance: 9,505

== Statistics ==
=== Appearances ===
No.	Pos	Nat	Player	NWSL				
No.	Pos	Nat	Player	Apps	Goals	Booked	(yellow card) (yellow-red card)	Sent off (straight red)
Goalkeepers
1	GK	(United States)	Jane Campbell	22	0	0	0	0
30	GK	(Mexico)	Bianca Henninger	0	0	0	0	0
16	GK	(United States)	Sammy Jo Prudhomme	0	0	0	0	0
Defenders
4	DF	(Canada)	Allysha Chapman	14	0	2	0	0
8	DF	(Australia)	Clare Polkinghorne	9	0	0	0	0
12	DF	(United States)	Amber Brooks	22	0	3	0	0
18	DF	(United States)	Kimberly Keever	10	1	1	0	0
55	DF	(South Africa)	Janine van Wyk	18	0	1	0	0
Midfielders
9	MF	(United States)	Haley Hanson	17	0	1	0	0
21	MF	(United States)	Taylor Comeau	10	0	0	0	0
19	MF	(United States)	Kristie Mewis	11	2	0	0	0
23	MF	(United States)	Sofia Huerta	10	4	1	0	0
10	MF	(South Africa)	Linda Motlhalo	19	1	0	0	0
6	MF	(United States)	Meleana Shim	8	0	0	0	0
Forwards
3	FW	(England)	Rachel Daly	22	9	4	0	0
7	FW	(United States)	Kealia Ohai	17	5	1	0	0
20	FW	(Canada)	Lindsay Agnew	11	0	0	0	0
11	FW	(South Africa)	Thembi Kgatlana	15	1	1	0	0
14	FW	(Canada)	Nichelle Prince	18	1	0	0	0
17	FW	(Australia)	Kyah Simon	13	2	1	0	0
13	FW	(United States)	Savannah Jordan	10	0	0	0	0
12	FW	(United States)	Veronica Latsko	19	3	0	0	0

Last updated: August 22, 2018.
Source: Competitive matches

== Honors and awards ==
=== NWSL Yearly Awards ===
==== NWSL Team of the Year ====
Team	Position	Player	Ref.
Second XI	Forward	(England) Rachel Daly	
Second XI	Forward	(United States) Sofia Huerta	

=== NWSL Monthly Awards ===
==== NWSL Player of the Month ====
Month	Result	Player	Ref
June	Won	(England) Rachel Daly	

==== NWSL Team of the Month ====
Month	Goalkeeper	Defenders	Midfielders	Forwards	Ref.
March	(United States) Jane Campbell	(England) Rachel Daly			
April					
May			(United States) Kristie Mewis	(England) Rachel Daly	
June				(United States) Kealia Ohai	
July				(England) Rachel Daly	
August		(United States) Taylor Comeau	(United States) Sofia Huerta		

=== NWSL Weekly Awards ===
==== NWSL Player of the Week ====
Week	Result	Player	Ref
9	Won	(England) Rachel Daly	
17	Won	(United States) Jane Campbell	

==== NWSL Save of the Week ====
Week	Result	Player	Ref.
2	Won	(United States) Jane Campbell	
4	Nominated	(United States) Jane Campbell	
6	Nominated	(United States) Amber Brooks	
7	Nominated	(United States) Van Wyk	
8	Nominated	(United States) Jane Campbell	
14	Nominated	(United States) Jane Campbell	
17	Nominated	(United States) Jane Campbell	
20	Nominated	(United States) Jane Campbell	
22	Nominated	(United States) Jane Campbell	

==== NWSL Goal of the Week ====
Week	Result	Player	Ref.
7	Nominated	(United States) Kristie Mewis	
9	Nominated	(United States) Kealia Ohai	
14	Won	(United States) Kealia Ohai	
17	Nominated	(England) Rachel Daly	
21	Nominated	(United States) Kealia Ohai	
22	Nominated	(United States) Sofia Huerta	

== Player transactions ==
=== 2018 NWSL College Draft ===
Source: National Women's Soccer League

Round	Pick	Nat.	Player	Pos.	Notes	Previous Team
Round 1	7	(United States)	Haley Hanson	MF		University of Nebraska-Lincoln
Round 2	12	(United States)	Kimberly Keever	FW		University of Washington
Round 3	28	(United States)	Veronica Latsko	FW		University of Virginia
Round 3	30	(United States)	Abby Elinsky	DF/MF		University of North Carolina
Round 4	33	(United States)	Sarah Shimer	GK		University of Washington

=== In ===
Date	Player	Positions played	Previous club	Fee/notes	Ref.
January 12, 2018	(United States) Savannah Jordan	FW	(United States) Portland Thorns FC	Acquired in trade for Andressinha.	
January 16, 2018	(Canada) Lindsay Agnew	FW	(United States) Washington Spirit	Acquired in trade for 3rd pick in 2018 NWSL College Draft.	
January 18, 2018	(United States) Christen Press	FW	(United States) Chicago Red Stars	Acquired in trade for Carli Lloyd and Janine Beckie. Draft picks and international roster spot were also part of trade.	
January 31, 2018	(United States) Michaela Hahn	MF	(Cyprus) Apollon Ladies F.C.	Signed during the offseason	
January 31, 2018	(United States) Allison Wetherington	MF	(United States) Portland Pilots	Signed during the offseason	
February 1, 2018	(South Africa) Linda Motlhalo	MF	(South Africa) JVW FC	Signed during the offseason	
February 13, 2018	(United States) Tiffany Weimer	FW	(United States) Washington Spirit	Acquired in trade for Dash's natural fourth-round pick in 2019 NWSL College Draft	
February 17, 2018	(South Africa) Thembi Kgatlana	FW	(South Africa) University of Western Cape	Signed during the offseason	
February 28, 2018	(Australia) Kyah Simon	FW	(United States) Boston Breakers	Acquired rights during Boston Breakers Dispersal Draft	
March 6, 2018	(United States) Meleana Shim	MF	(Sweden) Växjö DFF	Signed during preseason	
June 7, 2018	(Australia) Clare Polkinghorne	DF	(Australia) Brisbane Roar	Signed during season.	
June 18, 2018	(United States) Sofia Huerta	MF	(United States) Chicago Red Stars	Acquired in trade for Christen Press and 2020 first round draft pick.	
June 18, 2018	(United States) Taylor Comeau	MF	(United States) Chicago Red Stars	Acquired in trade for Christen Press and 2020 first round draft pick.	

=== Out ===
Date	Player	Positions played	Destination club	Fee/notes	Ref.
October 23, 2017	(United States) Kelly Conheeney	MF		Waived.	
January 12, 2018	(Brazil) Andressinha	MF	(United States) Portland Thorns FC	Traded for Savannah Jordan.	
January 19, 2018	(United States) Carli Lloyd	MF	(United States) Sky Blue FC	Traded (along with Janine Beckie) as part of a three team trade that also included Christen Press, Sam Kerr, Nikki Stanton and Jen Hoy. Draft picks and international roster spot were also part of trade.	
January 19, 2018	(Canada) Janine Beckie	FW	(United States) Sky Blue FC	Traded (along with Carli Lloyd) as part of a three team trade that also included Christen Press, Sam Kerr, Nikki Stanton and Jen Hoy. Draft picks and international roster spot were also part of trade.	
February 6, 2018	(Brazil) Poliana	DF	(United States) Orlando Pride	Traded for Orlando Pride's natural second-round pick in the 2019 NWSL College Draft	
February 8, 2018	(Brazil) Bruna Benites	DF		Waived.	
March 9, 2018	(United States) Cami Privett	MF		Retired.	
March 19, 2018	(United States) Cari Roccaro	MF	(United States) North Carolina Courage	Waived. Signed with the North Carolina Courage.	
March 19, 2018	(United States) Camille Levin	MF	(Norway) Vålerenga	Waived. Signed with Vålerenga in the Toppserien.	
March 21, 2018	(United States) Tiffany Weimer	FW	(United States) Washington Spirit	Waived. Claimed off waivers by the Washington Spirit.	
June 18, 2018	(United States) Claire Falknor	MF	(Spain) EDF Logroño	Waived. Signed with EDF Logroño in the Primera División.	
June 18, 2018	(Republic of Ireland) Alli Murphy	MF		Waived.	
June 18, 2018	(United States) Christen Press	FW	(United States) Utah Royals FC	Traded along with a 2020 first round draft pick as part of a three team trade involving the Chicago Red Stars and Utah Royals FC.	
August 16, 2018	(United States) Michaela Hahn	MF		Retired.	
