= Haley McCutcheon =

American soccer player (born 1996)

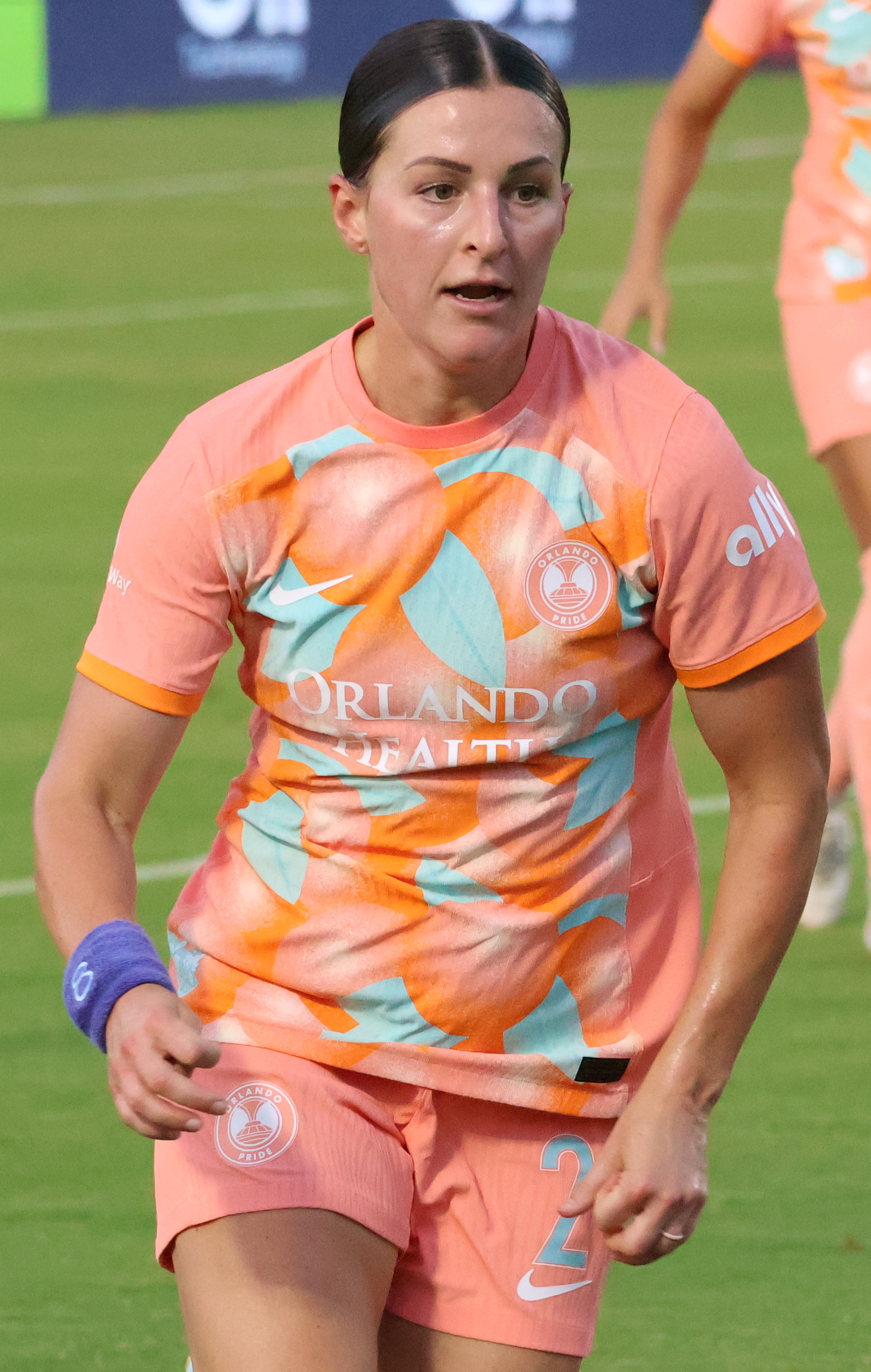
- McCutcheon with the Orlando Pride in 2024

Personal information
- Full name: Haley Jean McCutcheon
- Birth name: Haley Jean Hanson
- Date of birth: February 22, 1996 (age 30)
- Place of birth: Overland Park, Kansas, United States
- Height: 5 ft 6 in (1.68 m)
- Positions: Defensive midfielder; full back

Team information
- Current team: Orlando Pride
- Number: 2

College career
Years	Team	Apps	(Gls)
2014–2017	Nebraska Cornhuskers	75	(19)

Senior career*
Years	Team	Apps	(Gls)
2018–2022	Houston Dash	80	(1)
2019–2020	→ Melbourne Victory (loan)	12	(1)
2022–	Orlando Pride	105	(10)

International career^{‡}
2017–2019	United States U23	6	
2018	United States	1	(0)
- * Club domestic league appearances and goals as of 03:27, November 8, 2026 (UTC) ‡ National team caps and goals as of April 8, 2018

Haley Jean McCutcheon (née Hanson; born February 22, 1996) is an American professional soccer player who plays as a defensive midfielder for the Orlando Pride of the National Women's Soccer League (NWSL). She has previously played for Houston Dash of the NWSL and Melbourne Victory in the Australian W-League. She made her senior international debut for the United States in 2018.

== Club career ==
=== Houston Dash, 2018–2022 ===
McCutcheon was chosen by the Houston Dash with the 7th overall pick in the 2018 NWSL College Draft out of the University of Nebraska. She signed with the Dash and made her debut on March 25, 2018, in a 1–1 draw against Chicago Red Stars.

=== Orlando Pride, 2022–present ===
On August 18, 2022, McCutcheon was acquired via trade by the Orlando Pride in exchange for $75,000 in allocation money and a second-round pick in the 2023 NWSL Draft.

McCutcheon won the NWSL Shield with the Pride as they finished the 2024 regular season in first place. On November 8, 2024, she made her first NWSL playoff appearance; only Kealia Watt (138) had played more regular-season games before her playoff debut than McCutcheon (130). McCutcheon headed in the opening goal in that game, a 4–1 win over the Chicago Red Stars. On October 17, during the semifinal game vs the KC Current, with the Current up 1-0, McCutcheon scored the tying goal off an assist from Ally Watt (the Pride went on to win 3-2).

== International career ==
McCutcheon received her first call-up to the United States Women's National Team in April 2018 as she was added to the roster as a replacement for Kelley O'Hara who pulled out due to injury. She earned her first cap on April 8 in a friendly against Mexico.

On August 23, 2018, she was named to the United States U-23 team for the 2018 Nordic tournament.

== Personal life ==
She married her husband Payne McCutcheon in December 2022.

== Career statistics ==
=== College ===
Team	Season	Total		
Team	Season	Division	Apps	Goals
Nebraska Cornhuskers	2014	Div. I	19	0
Nebraska Cornhuskers	2015	Div. I	15	3
Nebraska Cornhuskers	2016	Div. I	22	7
Nebraska Cornhuskers	2017	Div. I	19	9
Total			75	19

=== Club ===
As of October 2, 2026.

Club	Season	League			Cup (Note: Includes the NWSL Challenge Cup)		Playoffs (Note: Includes W-League Finals series and NWSL playoffs)		Other		Total	
Club	Season	Division	Apps	Goals	Apps	Goals	Apps	Goals	Apps	Goals	Apps	Goals
Houston Dash	2018	NWSL	19	1	—		—		—		19	1
Houston Dash	2019	NWSL	24	0	—		—		—		24	0
Houston Dash	2020	NWSL	—		7	0	—		4 (Note: Includes the NWSL Fall Series)	0	11	0
Houston Dash	2021	NWSL	22	0	4	0	—		—		26	0
Houston Dash	2022	NWSL	15	0	5	0	—		—		20	0
Houston Dash	Total		80	1	16	0	0	0	4	0	100	1
Melbourne Victory (loan)	2019–20	W-League	12	1	—		1	0	—		13	1
Orlando Pride	2022	NWSL	6	0	0	0	—		—		6	0
Orlando Pride	2023	NWSL	22	1	4	0	—		—		26	1
Orlando Pride	2024	NWSL	22	0	—		3	2	2 (Note: Includes the 2024 NWSL x Liga MX Femenil Summer Cup)	0	27	2
Orlando Pride	2025	NWSL	26	4	1	0	2	0	1 (Note: Includes the CONCACAF W Champions Cup)	0	30	4
Orlando Pride	2026	NWSL	18	7	—		—		—		18	7
Orlando Pride	Total		94	12	5	0	5	2	3	0	107	14
Career total			185	14	21	0	6	2	7	0	219	16

=== International ===
United States
Year	Apps	Goals
2018	1	0
Total	1	0

== Honors ==
Houston Dash

- NWSL Challenge Cup: 2020

Orlando Pride

- NWSL Shield: 2024
- NWSL Championship: 2024
