= List of Senior CLASS Award women's soccer winners =

Senior CLASS Award for women's soccer
- Awarded for: the outstanding senior NCAA Division I Student-Athlete of the Year in women's soccer
- Country: United States
- First award: 2007
- Currently held by: Gabrielle Carle, Florida State
- Website: http://www.seniorclassaward.com/womenssoccer/

The Senior CLASS Award is presented each year to the outstanding senior NCAA Division I Student-Athlete of the Year in women's soccer. The award was established in 2007.

Year	Winner	School	Reference
2007	Stephanie Lopez	Portland	
2008	Kerri Hanks	Notre Dame	
2009	Emily Peterson	Texas A&M	
2010	Ali Hawkins	North Carolina	
2011	Lizzy Simonin	Memphis	
2012	Tishia Jewell	UCF	
2013	Kealia Ohai	North Carolina	
2014	Stephanie Verdoia	Seattle	
2015	Brianne Reed	Rutgers	
2016	Christina Gibbons	Duke	
2017	Andi Sullivan	Stanford	
2018	CeCe Kizer	Ole Miss	
2019	Sydney Fortson	Navy	
2021	Gabrielle Carle	Florida State	
