= Nichelle Prince =

Canadian soccer player (born 1995)

- Prince with the Boston Legacy in 2026

Personal information
- Full name: Nichelle Patrice Prince
- Date of birth: February 19, 1995 (age 31)
- Place of birth: Ajax, Ontario, Canada
- Height: 5 ft 4 in (1.63 m)
- Position: Forward

Team information
- Current team: Boston Legacy
- Number: 12

Youth career
- Ajax SC
- Richmond Hill SC
- Pickering SC
- Toronto Lynx

College career
Years	Team	Apps	(Gls)
2013–2016	Ohio State Buckeyes	72	(27)

Senior career*
Years	Team	Apps	(Gls)
2013–2014	Toronto Lady Lynx		
2017–2023	Houston Dash	88	(12)
2024–2025	Kansas City Current	34	(3)
2026–	Boston Legacy	28	(2)

International career^{‡}
2012	Canada U-17	9	(3)
2014	Canada U-20	4	(1)
2013–	Canada	119	(20)
Medal record
Women's soccer
Representing Canada
CONCACAF W Championship
Runner-up	2018
Olympic Games
Gold medal – first place	2020	Team
Bronze medal – third place	2016	Team
- * Club domestic league appearances and goals as of 02:16, November 8, 2026 (UTC) ‡ National team caps and goals as of October 12, 2026

Nichelle Patrice Prince (born February 19, 1995) is a Canadian professional soccer player who plays as a forward for Boston Legacy FC of the National Women's Soccer League (NWSL) and the Canada national team. She played college soccer for the Ohio State Buckeyes and was drafted by the Houston Dash in the third round of the 2017 NWSL College Draft. She also played for the Kansas City Current.

== Club career ==
After playing college soccer with the Ohio State Buckeyes, Prince was selected 28th overall by the Houston Dash in the 2017 NWSL College Draft. Prince would miss the majority of the 2019 season after tearing her meniscus at the 2019 Women's World Cup.

In January 2024, Prince was traded to the Kansas City Current. She was part of the team which won the 2025 NWSL Shield.

On January 13, 2026, NWSL expansion team Boston Legacy FC announced that they had acquired Prince from Kansas City in exchange for $125,000 in allocation funds and $50,000 in intra-league transfer funds.

== International career ==
Prince was a member of the Canada team that won a silver medal at the 2012 CONCACAF Under-17 Championship in Guatemala and a silver medal at the 2016 CONCACAF Women's Olympic Qualifying Championship. She and her team won an Olympic bronze medal at the 2016 Summer Olympics in Rio de Janeiro. On May 25, 2019, she was named to the roster for the 2019 FIFA Women's World Cup.

On August 6, 2021, she won the Olympic Gold Medal in the 2020 Summer Olympics with Canada.

Prince was called up to the Canada squad for the 2022 CONCACAF W Championship, where Canada finished as runners-up.

Prince was called up to the 23-player Canada squad for the 2023 FIFA Women's World Cup.

Prince was called up to the Canada squad for the 2024 CONCACAF W Gold Cup, which Canada finished as semifinalists.

Prince was called up to the Canada squad for the 2024 Summer Olympics. On July 31, 2024, Prince recorded her 100th cap for Canada in a 1–0 victory over Colombia during the 2024 Summer Olympics.

== Personal life ==
Prince's father is Afro-Jamaican, while her mother comes from the United States. She has two sisters named Christine and Kendra. She enjoys reading, writing, yoga during her free time. Her favourites have included soccer players Christine Sinclair, Lionel Messi and Carlos Tevez, Canadian hurdlers Perdita Felicien and Priscilla Lopes-Schliep, and soccer clubs Real Madrid and Manchester City.

== Career statistics ==
=== Club ===
As of November 3, 2025

Appearances and goals by club, season and competition
Club	Season	League			Cup (Note: Includes the NWSL Challenge Cup)		Playoffs (Note: Includes NWSL Playoffs)		Other		Total	
Club	Season	Division	Apps	Goals	Apps	Goals	Apps	Goals	Apps	Goals	Apps	Goals
Houston Dash	2017	NWSL	23	3	—		—		—		23	3
Houston Dash	2018	NWSL	20	1	—		—		—		20	1
Houston Dash	2019	NWSL	4	1	—		—		—		4	1
Houston Dash	2020	NWSL	—		6	0	—		4 (Note: Includes the NWSL Fall Series)	1	10	1
Houston Dash	2021	NWSL	16	2	2	0	—		—		18	2
Houston Dash	2022	NWSL	18	5	6	1	1	0	—		25	6
Houston Dash	2023	NWSL	7	0	0	0	0	0	—		7	0
Houston Dash	Total		88	12	14	1	1	0	4	1	107	14
Kansas City Current	2024	NWSL	13	2	0	0	1	0	0	0	14	2
Kansas City Current	2025	NWSL	21	1	0	0	0	0	0	0	21	1
Kansas City Current	Total		34	3	0	0	1	0	0	0	35	3
Career total			122	15	14	1	2	0	4	1	142	17

=== International ===
As of match played October 12, 2026

Appearances and goals by national team and year
National team	Year	Apps	Goals
Canada	2013	3	1
Canada	2014	0	0
Canada	2015	4	2
Canada	2016	14	3
Canada	2017	11	0
Canada	2018	11	4
Canada	2019	12	1
Canada	2020	4	0
Canada	2021	16	2
Canada	2022	15	0
Canada	2023	6	3
Canada	2024	7	0
Canada	2025	10	1
Canada	2026	6	3
Total		119	20

Scores and results list Canada's goal tally first, score column indicates score after each Prince goal.

List of international goals scored by Nichelle Prince
No.	Date	Venue	Opponent	Score	Result	Competition
1	January 14, 2013	Yongchuan Sports Center, Yongchuan, China	South Korea	1–3	1–3	2013 Four Nations Tournament
2	December 9, 2015	Arena das Dunas, Natal, Brazil	Mexico	3–0	3–0	2015 International Women's Football Tournament of Natal
3	December 13, 2015	Arena das Dunas, Natal, Brazil	Trinidad and Tobago	3–0	4–0	2015 International Women's Football Tournament of Natal
4	February 16, 2016	BBVA Compass Stadium, Houston, United States	Guatemala	4–0	10–0	2016 CONCACAF Women's Olympic Qualifying Championship
5	February 16, 2016	BBVA Compass Stadium, Houston, United States	Guatemala	8–0	10–0	2016 CONCACAF Women's Olympic Qualifying Championship
6	February 16, 2016	BBVA Compass Stadium, Houston, United States	Guatemala	9–0	10–0	2016 CONCACAF Women's Olympic Qualifying Championship
7	September 2, 2018	TD Place Arena, Ottawa, Canada	Brazil	1–0	1–0	Friendly
8	October 5, 2018	H-E-B Park, Edinburg, United States	Jamaica	1–0	2–0	2018 CONCACAF Women's Championship
9	October 5, 2018	H-E-B Park, Edinburg, United States	Jamaica	2–0	2–0	2018 CONCACAF Women's Championship
10	October 11, 2018	H-E-B Park, Edinburg, United States	Costa Rica	2–0	3–1	2018 CONCACAF Women's Championship
11	June 15, 2019	Stade des Alpes, Grenoble, France	New Zealand	2–0	2–0	2019 FIFA Women's World Cup
12	April 13, 2021	bet365 Stadium, Stoke-on-Trent, England	England	2–0	2–0	Friendly
13	October 23, 2021	TD Place Arena, Ottawa, Canada	New Zealand	3–0	5–1	Friendly
14	September 22, 2023	Independence Park, Kingston, Jamaica	Jamaica	1–0	2–0	CONCACAF Olympic Play-in
15	December 1, 2023	Starlight Stadium, Langford, Canada	Australia	1–0	5–0	Friendly
16	December 1, 2023	Starlight Stadium, Langford, Canada	Australia	2–0	5–0	Friendly
17	April 4, 2025	BC Place, Vancouver, Canada	Argentina	2–0	3–0	Friendly
18	March 1, 2026	Geodis Park, Nashville, United States	Colombia	4–1	4–1	2026 SheBelieves Cup
19	April 11, 2026	Arena Pantanal, Cuiabá, Brazil	Zambia	1–0	4–0	2026 FIFA Series
20	April 11, 2026	Arena Pantanal, Cuiabá, Brazil	Zambia	2–0	4–0	2026 FIFA Series

== Honours ==
Houston Dash

- NWSL Challenge Cup: 2020

Kansas City Current

- NWSL Shield: 2025
- NWSL x Liga MX Femenil Summer Cup: 2024

Canada

- Summer Olympic Games Gold Medal: 2020
- Summer Olympic Games Bronze Medal: 2016

== See also ==
- List of women's footballers with 100 or more international caps
