= Amber Wisner =

American soccer player (born 1991)

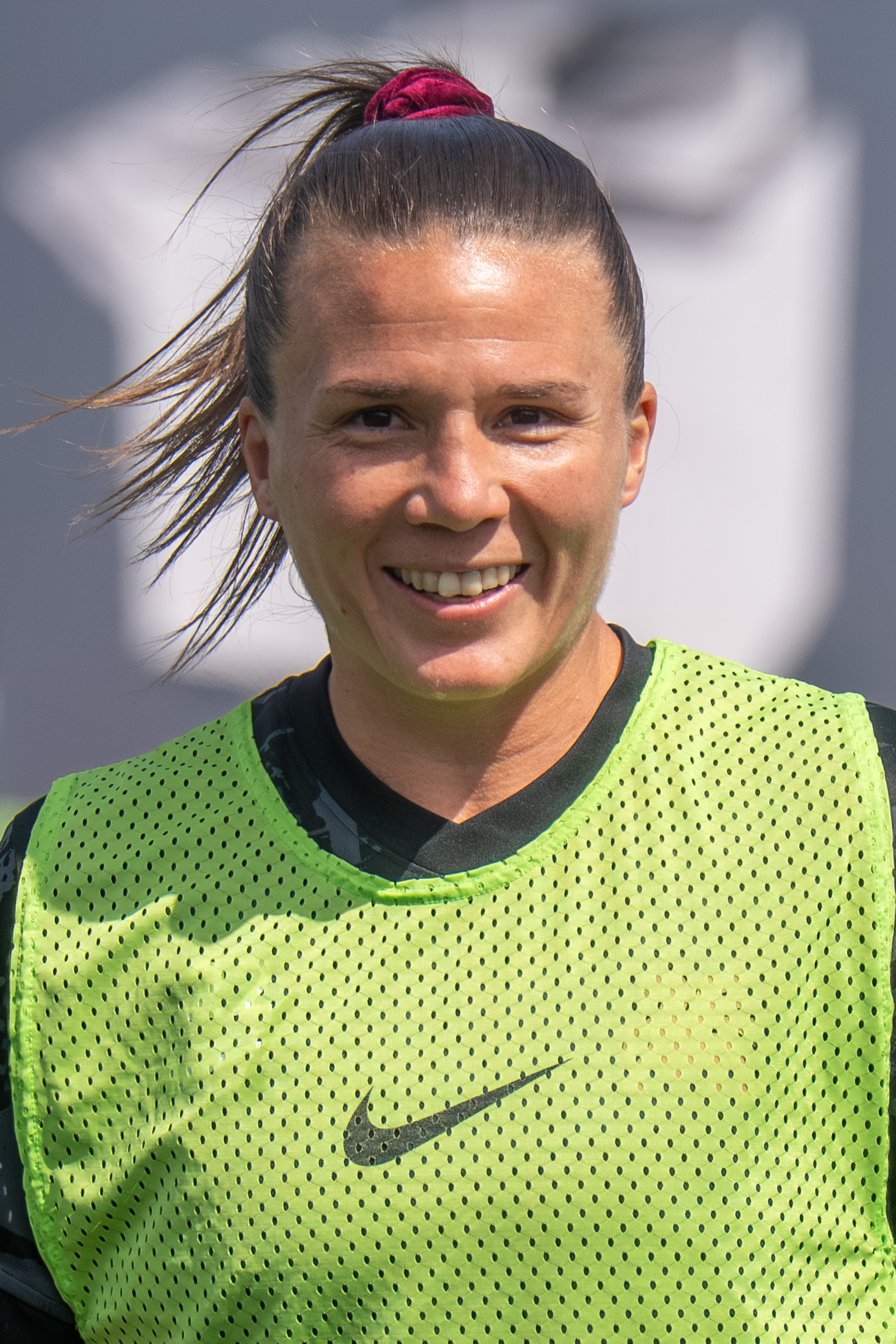
- Wisner with the Dallas Trinity in 2026

Personal information
- Birth name: Amber Jean Brooks
- Date of birth: January 23, 1991 (age 35)
- Place of birth: Evansville, Indiana, United States
- Height: 5 ft 6 in (1.68 m)
- Positions: Defender; midfielder

Youth career
- 2005–2007: Pennington Red Hawks

College career
Years	Team	Apps	(Gls)
2009–2012	North Carolina Tar Heels	93	(17)

Senior career*
Years	Team	Apps	(Gls)
2011	Vancouver Whitecaps		
2013	Bayern Munich	19	(9)
2014	Portland Thorns	21	(1)
2014–2015	→ Bayern Munich (loan)	8	(0)
2015	Seattle Reign	12	(1)
2016–2019	Houston Dash	91	(4)
2018–2019	→ Adelaide United (loan)	12	(0)
2019–2020	Adelaide United	11	(1)
2020–2021	OL Reign	11	(0)
2022–2023	Washington Spirit	29	(2)
2024–2026	Dallas Trinity	48	(6)

International career^{‡}
2008–2009	United States U-17		
2010–2011	United States U-20	9	(1)
2012	United States U-23		
2013	United States	1	(0)
- * Club domestic league appearances and goals as of 00:05, April 3, 2026 (UTC) ‡ National team caps and goals as of November 10, 2013

Amber Jean Wisner (née Brooks; born January 23, 1991) is an American former professional soccer player who had a 14-year career in the National Women's Soccer League (NWSL), USL Super League, Frauen-Bundesliga, and W-League.

Wisner played college soccer for North Carolina Tar Heels, winning two national championships (2009 and 2012). She was drafted by the Portland Thorns in the third round of the 2013 NWSL College Draft, but started her professional career with Bayern Munich in Germany. After joining the Thorns for 2014, she returned to Bayern on loan and helped them win their first Bundesliga title. She was traded to the Seattle Reign in 2015, winning the NWSL Shield, before another trade to the Houston Dash the following year.

With the Dash, Wisner completed three consecutive iron woman seasons (2017–2019) and set the NWSL record for consecutive minutes played, being named the club's MVP in 2017. She also played on loan for W-League club Adelaide United and was their Player of the Year in 2019. She returned to the Reign in 2020, then signed with the Washington Spirit two years later. She became the inaugural captain of USL Super League club Dallas Trinity in 2024, where she retired after two iron woman seasons.

Wisner represented the United States on numerous youth national teams, winning silver at the 2008 FIFA U-17 Women's World Cup and appearing at the 2010 FIFA U-20 Women's World Cup. She earned one cap with the senior national team in 2013.

== Early life ==
Born in Evansville, Indiana, and raised in New Hope, Pennsylvania, Wisner attended The Pennington School in New Jersey. She scored 62 goals and had 30 assists during her first three years for a total of 154 points. She did not play as a senior due to a knee injury and National Team commitments. Wisner was named first-team All-County and a Parade Magazine All-America as a junior after she helped the team finish the 2008 season undefeated at 18–0, winning its sixth straight Prep-A state championship and its third MCT Championship in five years. Pennington was ranked by the NSCAA and ESPN Rise as the number one team in the nation the same year. Wisner was awarded the 2008 NSCAA Girls' Scholar Athlete of the Year Award and was ranked by ESPN Rise as the number one recruit in the nation in 2009.

=== University of North Carolina ===
Wisner was captain of the University of North Carolina Tar Heels women's soccer team her junior and senior year (2011–2012). She accrued several accolades during her four years with the Tar Heels, becoming a two-time NCAA National Champion and winning the College Cup in 2009 and in 2012. She scored 34 goals and added 19 assists during her college career.

== Club career ==
=== Vancouver Whitecaps, 2011 ===
During the summer of 2011, Wisner played for the Vancouver Whitecaps in the W-League. She made five appearances, playing 391 minutes, and provided one assist.

=== Bayern Munich, 2013–2015 ===
On January 11, 2013, Wisner signed with German club, Bayern Munich in the Bundesliga until June 30, 2014. In her first Bundesliga game against SGS Essen, she scored two goals, including the game-winning goal in the 90th minute.

=== Portland Thorns, 2013–2014 ===
Wisner was drafted by Portland Thorns on January 18, 2013, during the 2013 National Women's Soccer League College Draft. Her debut came while visiting the Houston Dash in which she played the entirety of the 1–0 victory. She would go on to start another 19 matches for the club in addition to a solitary substitution appearance. Wisner collected her first and only goal for the Thorns during the season while adding two assists, though her primary contributions were on the defensive end of the field where her ferocity led to a team-leading four yellow cards on the season. After the conclusion of the Thorns 2014 season, the team announced that she would be on loan to her previous side Bayern Munich and become the second Portland member to be headed to Germany after the 2014 season, following teammate Verónica Boquete to the Bundesliga. While Portland initially indicated that Wisner would be re-signed for the 2015 National Women's Soccer League season, she was instead traded to the Western New York Flash on November 6, 2014, in exchange for midfielder McCall Zerboni and defender Kathryn Williamson.

=== Seattle Reign, 2015 ===
In March 2015, Wisner was traded to Seattle Reign along with the rights to Abby Wambach in exchange for Sydney Leroux and Amanda Frisbie. She made twelve appearances and scored one goal for Seattle.

=== Houston Dash, 2015–2019 ===
On October 26, 2015, Wisner was traded to the Houston Dash in exchange for Meghan Klingenberg and a conditional selection in the 2017 NWSL College Draft from Seattle Reign. Wisner had her contract option exercised for the 2017 season. She was named the 2017 Dash MVP and played all 2,160 minutes of the regular season, scored one goal and tallied two assists, captaining the side eight times. She was then re-signed for the 2018 season. Wisner was named 2018 Dash Defender of the Year. The club has exercised her contract option for the 2019 season. On April 14, 2019, Wisner played in her 100th career NWSL game, becoming the 22nd player to reach that mark.

==== Loan to Adelaide United ====
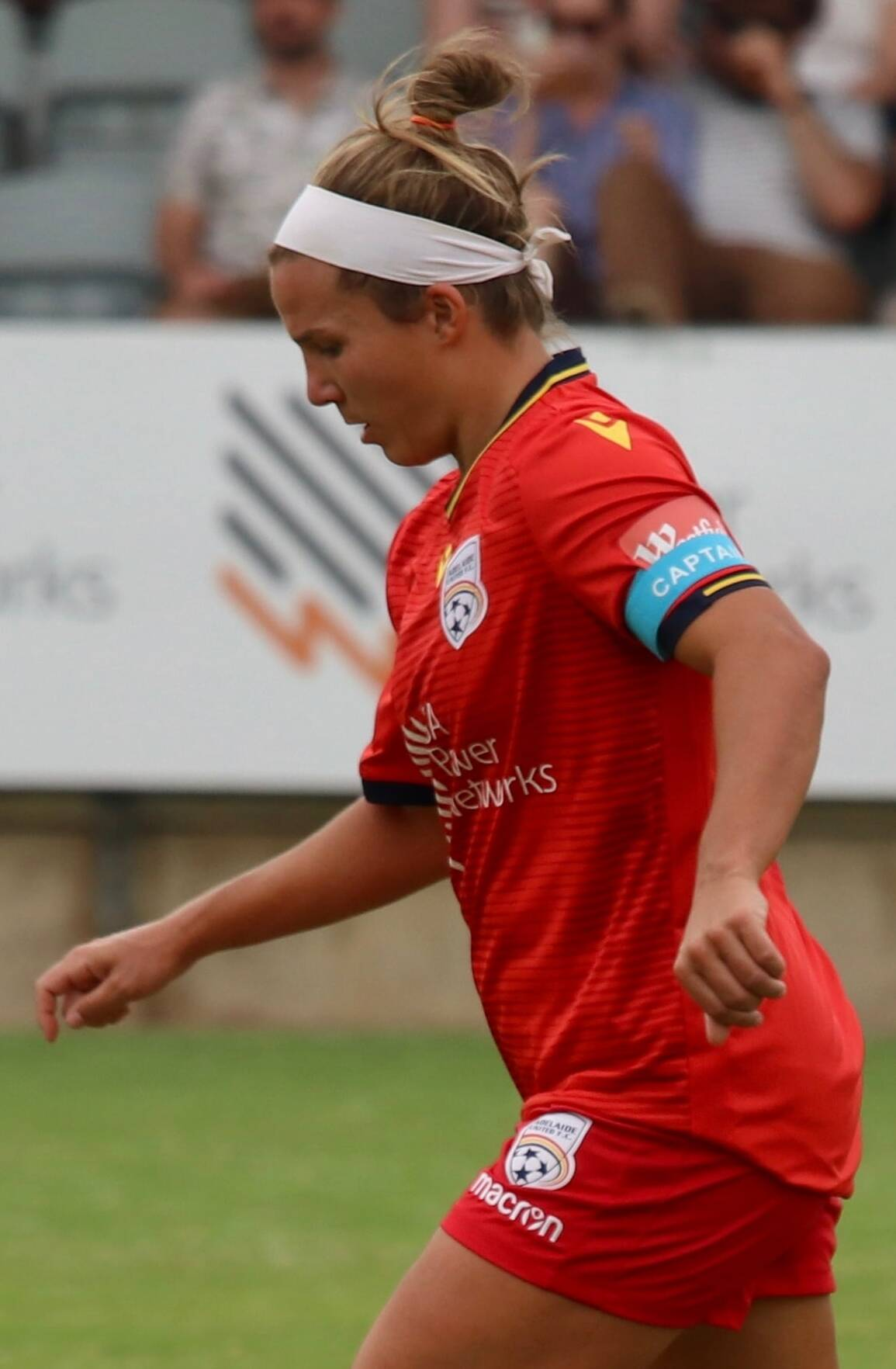
Wisner playing for Adelaide United in 2019

Wisner signed with Adelaide United for the 2018–19 W-League season, alongside Houston Dash teammate Veronica Latsko.

=== OL Reign, 2020–2021 ===
Wisner was out of contract following the 2019 NWSL season and Houston Dash traded her rights to OL Reign. She subsequently signed a three-year contract with the Tacoma-based club on March 4, 2020.

=== Washington Spirit, 2022–2023 ===
Wisner signed one-year deal with the Washington Spirit in 2022. She would re-sign with the club for another year on December 19, 2022.

=== Dallas Trinity FC, 2024–2026 ===
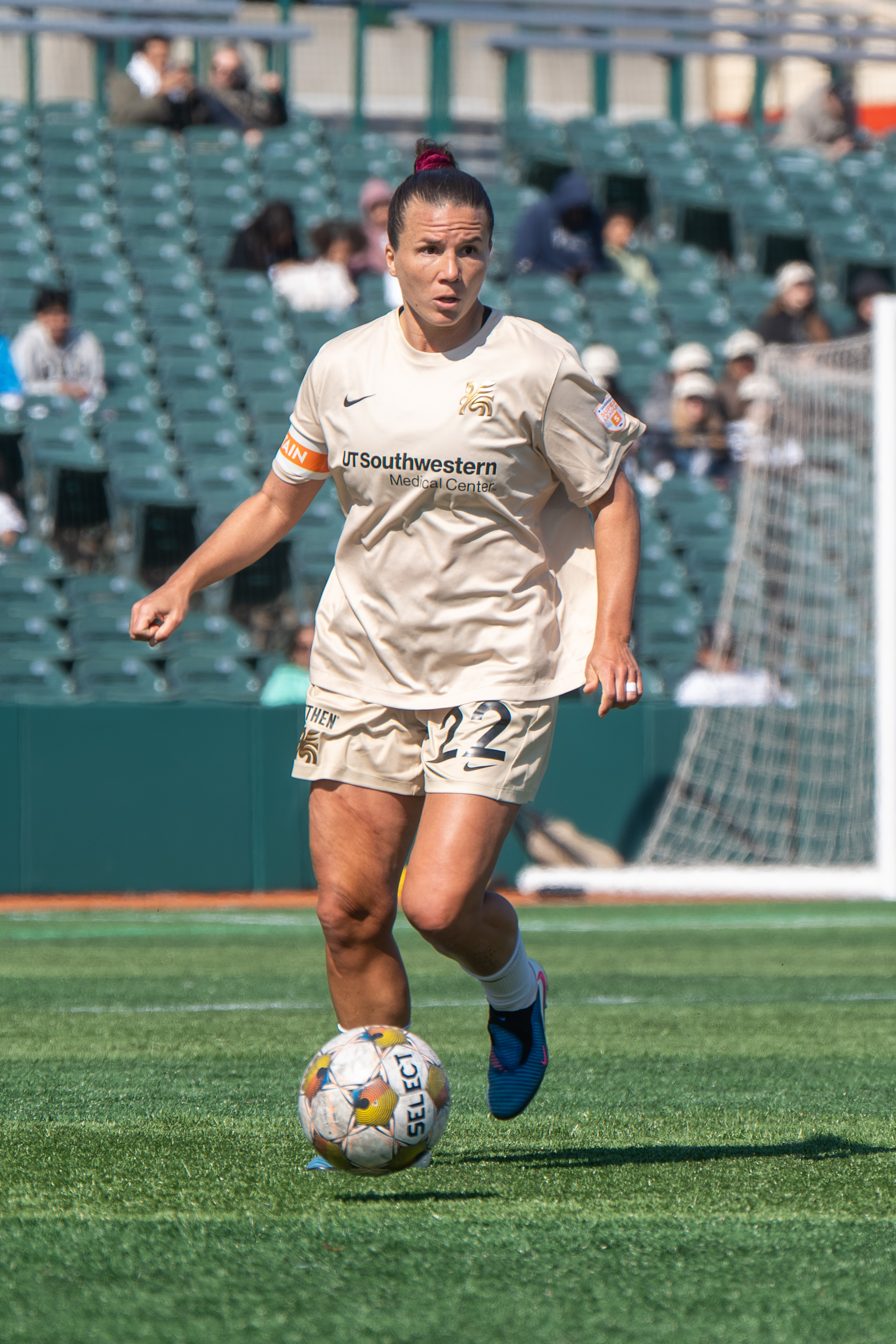
Wisner with the Dallas Trinity in 2026

Wisner entered free agency at the end of 2023. She trained with the NWSL's Chicago Red Stars in the 2024 preseason, but was not signed to the roster. She also trained in the spring with her alma mater North Carolina Tar Heels. She said she reached out to the Dallas Trinity with interest in their general manager position, but as Chris Petrucelli was already being hired in the role, she agreed to sign as a player for the last seasons of her career. In May 2024, she was officially announced as the first player in club history before the inaugural season of the USL Super League. She was also named their inaugural captain.

Wisner debuted for the Trinity in their inaugural game on August 18, 2024, as they drew 1–1 with the Tampa Bay Sun. On September 13, she scored her first goal for the club and recorded two assists in a 6–2 win over Lexington SC. She played every minute of the inaugural season and scored 3 goals in 28 appearances. Dallas placed third in the table and lost to eventual champions Tampa Bay Sun in the playoff semifinals. After the season, she was named to the inaugural All-League First Team alongside teammate Allie Thornton.

The following season, Wisner completed a second consecutive iron woman campaign, becoming the first USL Super League player to reach 5,000 career minutes. On May 16, 2026, she played her final home game at the Cotton Bowl – and her 300th career club appearance – as Dallas won 4–0 against Fort Lauderdale United to clinch a playoff berth on the final day of the season. She scored 3 goals in 28 appearances in her second season, and was again named to the All-League First Team. She retired following a loss to Lexington SC in the playoff semifinals.

== International career ==
Wisner competed on behalf of the United States in various national youth teams since 2007, including at the 2008 FIFA U-17 Women's World Cup. As a member of the U-20 national team, she represented the United States at the 2010 FIFA U-20 Women's World Cup in Germany and won the 2010 CONCACAF Women's U-20 Championship. She was a captain of the U-23 national team.

On November 10, 2013, Wisner made her debut for the USWNT team against Brazil in a friendly; started in the match and played 81 minutes.

== Personal life ==
She is married to Jay Wisner and began using her married name in 2025.

== Career statistics ==
As of match played May 23, 2026.

Appearances and goals by club, season and competition
Club	Season	League			National Cup (Note: Includes the DFB-Pokal)		League Cup		Total	
Club	Season	Division	Apps	Goals	Apps	Goals	Apps	Goals	Apps	Goals
Bayern Munich	2012–13	Bundesliga	10	4	1	0	—		11	4
Bayern Munich	2013–14	Bundesliga	9	5	2	1	—		11	6
Portland Thorns	2014	NWSL	20	1	—		—		20	1
Bayern Munich (loan)	2014–15	Bundesliga	8	0	2	1	—		10	1
Seattle Reign	2015	NWSL	12	1	—		—		12	1
Houston Dash	2016	NWSL	19	1	—		—		19	1
Houston Dash	2017	NWSL	24	1	—		—		24	1
Houston Dash	2018	NWSL	24	1	—		—		24	1
Adelaide United FC (loan)	2018–2019	W–League	12	0	—		—		12	0
Houston Dash	2019	NWSL	24	1	—		—		24	1
Adelaide United FC	2019–2020	W–League	11	1	—		—		11	1
OL Reign	2020	NWSL	0	0	—		8 (Note: Includes appearances in NWSL Challenge Cup and NWSL Fall Series)	0	8	0
OL Reign	2021	NWSL	11	0	—		3 (Note: Includes appeaarnces in NWSL Challenge Cup)	1	15	1
Washington Spirit	2022	NWSL	16	2	—		4	0	20	2
Washington Spirit	2023	NWSL	13	0	—		6	0	19	0
Dallas Trinity FC	2024–25	USL Super League	28	3	—		1 (Note: Includes appearances from USL Super League playoffs)	0	29	3
Dallas Trinity FC	2025–26	USL Super League	28	3	—		1	0	29	3
Career total			269	24	5	2	24	1	298	27

== Honors and awards ==
Individual

- USL Super League All-League First Team: 2024–25, 2025–26
- Houston Dash Most Valuable Player: 2017
- Houston Dash Defensive Player of the Year: 2019
- Adelaide United Player of the Year: 2018–19
- First-team All-ACC: 2011, 2012
- Second-team All-ACC: 2010
- ACC all-freshman team: 2009

North Carolina Tar Heels

- NCAA Division I women's soccer tournament: 2009, 2012

Bayern Munich

- Frauen-Bundesliga: 2014–15

Seattle Reign

- NWSL Shield: 2015

United States U20

- CONCACAF Women's U-20 Championship: 2012

== See also ==
- List of University of North Carolina at Chapel Hill alumni
- List of recipients of Today's Top 10 Award
