= Ariana Calderón =

American-born Mexican footballer (born 1990)

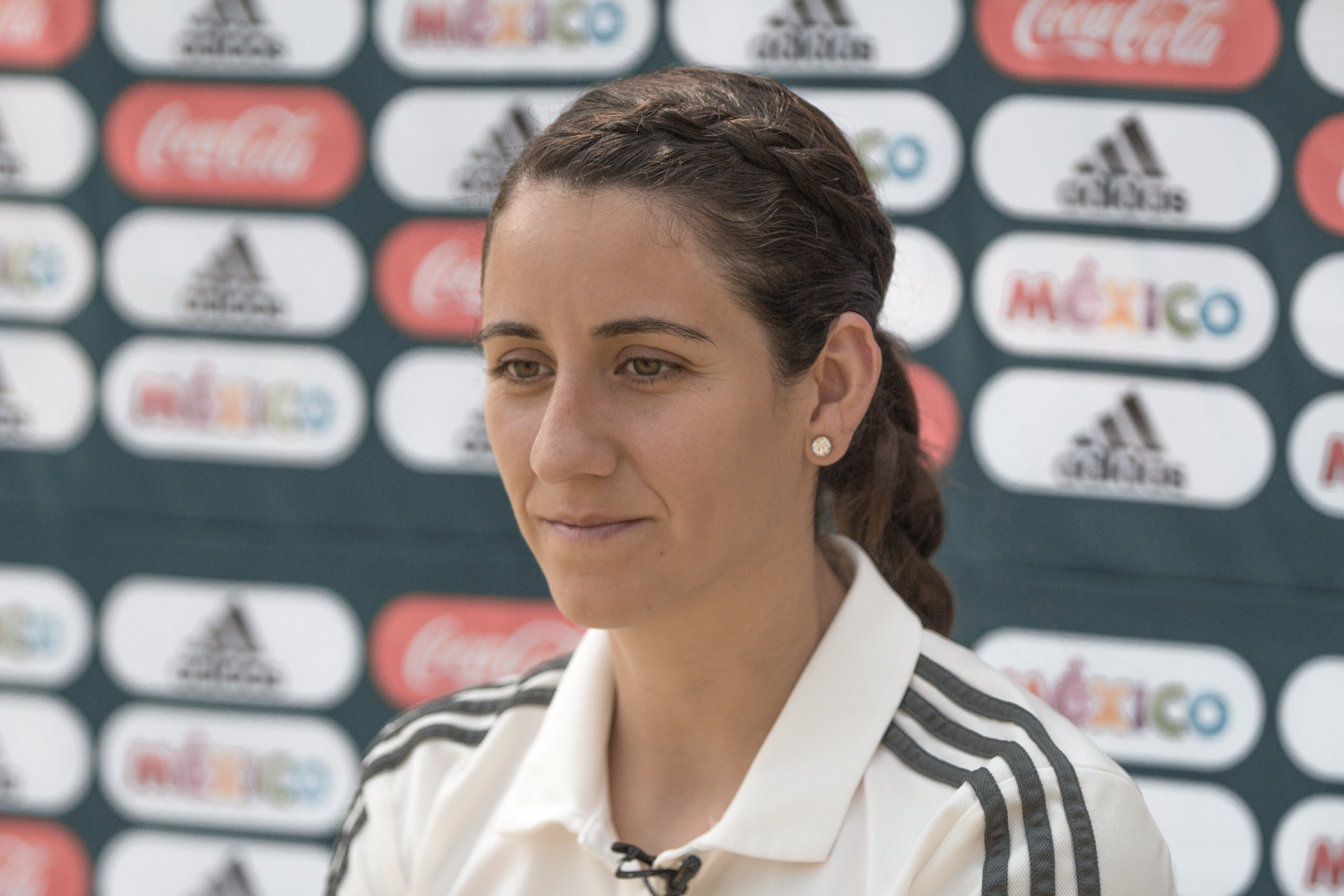

Personal information
- Full name: Ariana Catrina Calderón Valdez
- Date of birth: 12 May 1990 (age 36)
- Place of birth: Sacramento, California, United States
- Height: 1.65 m (5 ft 5 in)
- Position: Forward

College career
Years	Team	Apps	(Gls)
2008–2011	LIU Brooklyn Blackbirds	75	(29)

Senior career*
Years	Team	Apps	(Gls)
2013	Kokkola F10	14	(2)
2014	ÍBV	5	(0)
2016	California Storm		
2016	Medkila	7	(2)
2017	Valur	18	(7)
2018	Þór/KA	15	(1)
2019	Houston Dash	4	(0)
2020	Monterrey	6	(1)

International career^{‡}
2014–2018	Mexico	14	(2)
- * Club domestic league appearances and goals as of 31 January 2020 ‡ National team caps and goals as of 10 October 2018

Ariana Catrina Calderón Valdez (born 12 May 1990) is an American-born Mexican former footballer who last played as forward for Liga MX Femenil club CF Monterrey and the Mexico women's national team.
