= Kealia Watt =

American soccer player (born 1992)

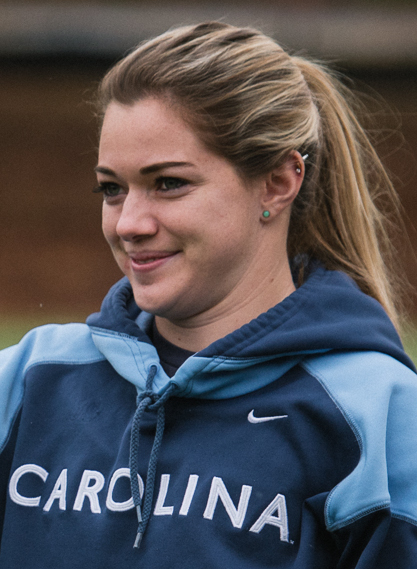
- Watt in 2014

Personal information
- Full name: Kealia Ohai Watt
- Birth name: Kealia Mae Ohai
- Date of birth: January 31, 1992 (age 34)
- Place of birth: Draper, Utah, United States
- Height: 5 ft 5 in (1.65 m)
- Positions: Midfielder; forward

Youth career
- 2000–2010: Avalanche Soccer Club
- 2006–2010: Alta High School

College career
Years	Team	Apps	(Gls)
2010–2013	North Carolina Tar Heels	44	(20)

Senior career*
Years	Team	Apps	(Gls)
2014–2019	Houston Dash	114	(28)
2020–2021	Chicago Red Stars	28	(7)

International career^{‡}
2010	United States U-17		
2009–2012	United States U-20	24	(8)
2013	United States U-23	2	(0)
2016	United States	3	(1)
- * Club domestic league appearances and goals as of February 14, 2022 ‡ National team caps and goals as of November 13, 2017

Kealia Ohai Watt (/keɪˈliːə/ kay-ə-LEE-ə; born Kealia Mae Ohai; January 31, 1992) is an American former professional soccer player who played for the Chicago Red Stars and the Houston Dash in the National Women's Soccer League (NWSL).

Watt played for the North Carolina Tar Heels in college, winning the NCAA championship in 2012. She represented the United States on the under-17, under-20, under-23 and senior national teams. She scored the winning goal in the final match of the 2012 FIFA U-20 Women's World Cup.

== Early life ==
Watt was born to Ben and Cindy Ohai and raised in Draper, Utah. Her sister, Megan, is a former youth national team member who played soccer at USC where she won the 2007 NCAA championship. She is part Hawaiian on her father's side. Her parents named her after Kealia Beach on the island of Kauai.

Watt, who graduated from Alta High School in June 2010, was a four-year varsity soccer player at the school. She led the team to four straight state soccer championships from 2006 to 2009. She was a two-time Gatorade state player of the year, three-time first-team high school All-America, three-time All-State selection, three-time 5A soccer MVP, and the 2010 NSCAA National High School Player of the year. In June 2010, she earned Parade All-American honors.

As a youth, Watt also played club soccer for the Utah Avalanche. With the team, she won four state titles.

== College career ==
A four-year starter with the Tar Heels from 2010 to 2013, Watt was a member of the 2012 championship-winning team. She was named the tournament's most outstanding offensive player after scoring the game-winning goal during overtime in the semi-final and the first goal of the final in the second minute of the match.

Following her freshman year playing for the Tar Heels, Watt was named to the First-Team All-Atlantic Coast Conference (ACC) and ACC All-Freshman Team. She led the team in scoring with 14 goals and started 22 of the team's 24 games. During her sophomore year, she started in all 20 games in which she played. She scored six goals, including a team high of 3 game-winning goals and served six assists. In her third year with the Tar Heels, Ohai led the team in points (23) and goals (9).

== Club career ==
=== Houston Dash, 2014–2019 ===
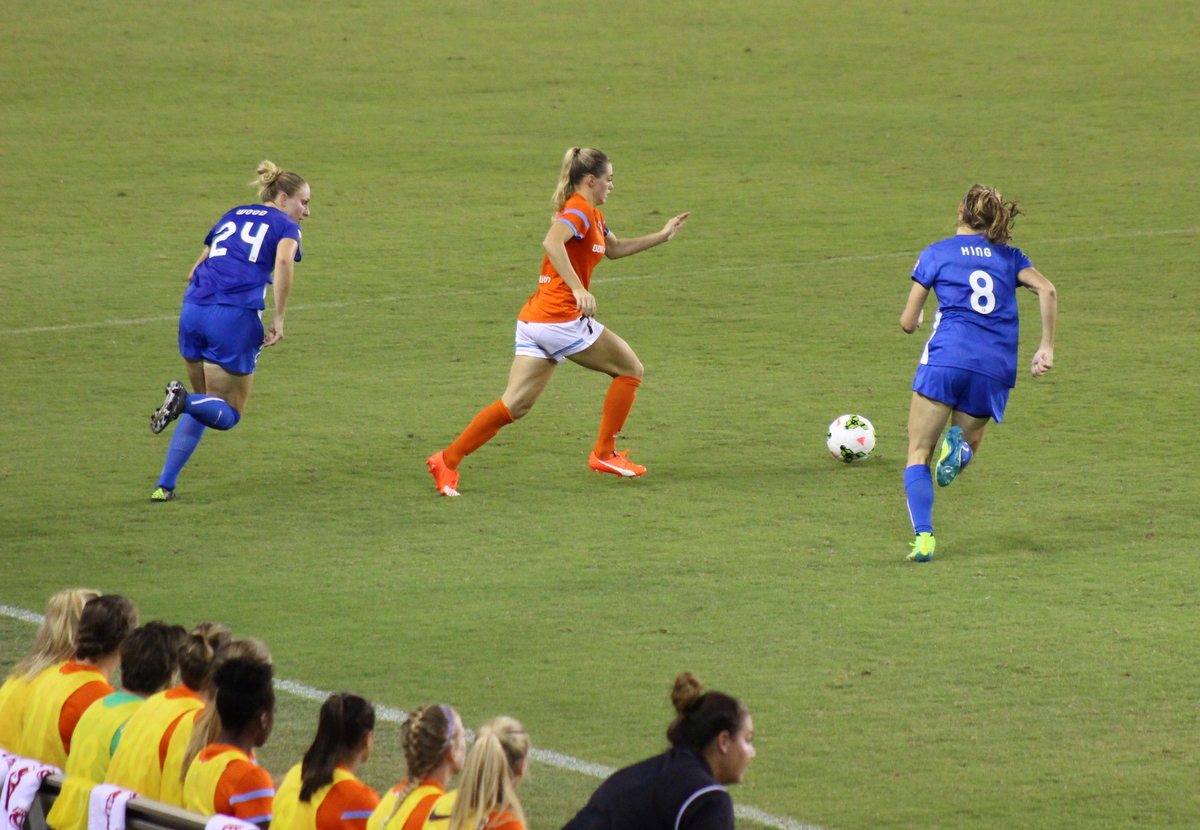
Ohai during a match against the Boston Breakers, August 2015

Watt was selected as the second overall pick in the 2014 NWSL College Draft by the Houston Dash as the expansion team's very first college draft pick. Of her draft selection, Dash head coach Randy Waldrum said, "I couldn't have asked for things to fall into place so well. It was an amazing day for the Dash. Starting with the selection of Kealia Ohai, we got one of the nation's best forwards. She has great pace, is extremely athletic, and can really stretch defenses with her speed." She came second in voting for NWSL Rookie of the Year following the 2014 season.

She became the club's captain midway through the 2016 season, which coincided with a scoring streak which saw her net 11 goals in 10 games. Watt was named NWSL Player of the Week for weeks 15 and 17. She finished the season tied with Lynn Williams for the golden boot; Williams was given the award as she had more assists. Watt was named to the 2016 NWSL Best XI.

In 2017, Watt scored two goals in 10 games before tearing her ACL on June 24 in a game against the Orlando Pride. This injury would force her to miss the remainder of the 2017 season.

Watt returned to the field on April 22, 2018, against the Orlando Pride. In 2018, she appeared in 19 games and scored 5 goals.

=== Chicago Red Stars, 2020–2021 ===
On January 6, 2020, Watt was traded to the Chicago Red Stars in exchange for defender Katie Naughton and the 18th overall selection in the 2020 NWSL College Draft.

After the 2021 season, Watt was a free agent. She did not officially announce her retirement from professional soccer, but Watt's husband later broke the news that she was retired from professional soccer during an interview with People in 2023, ending speculation about her return.

== International career ==
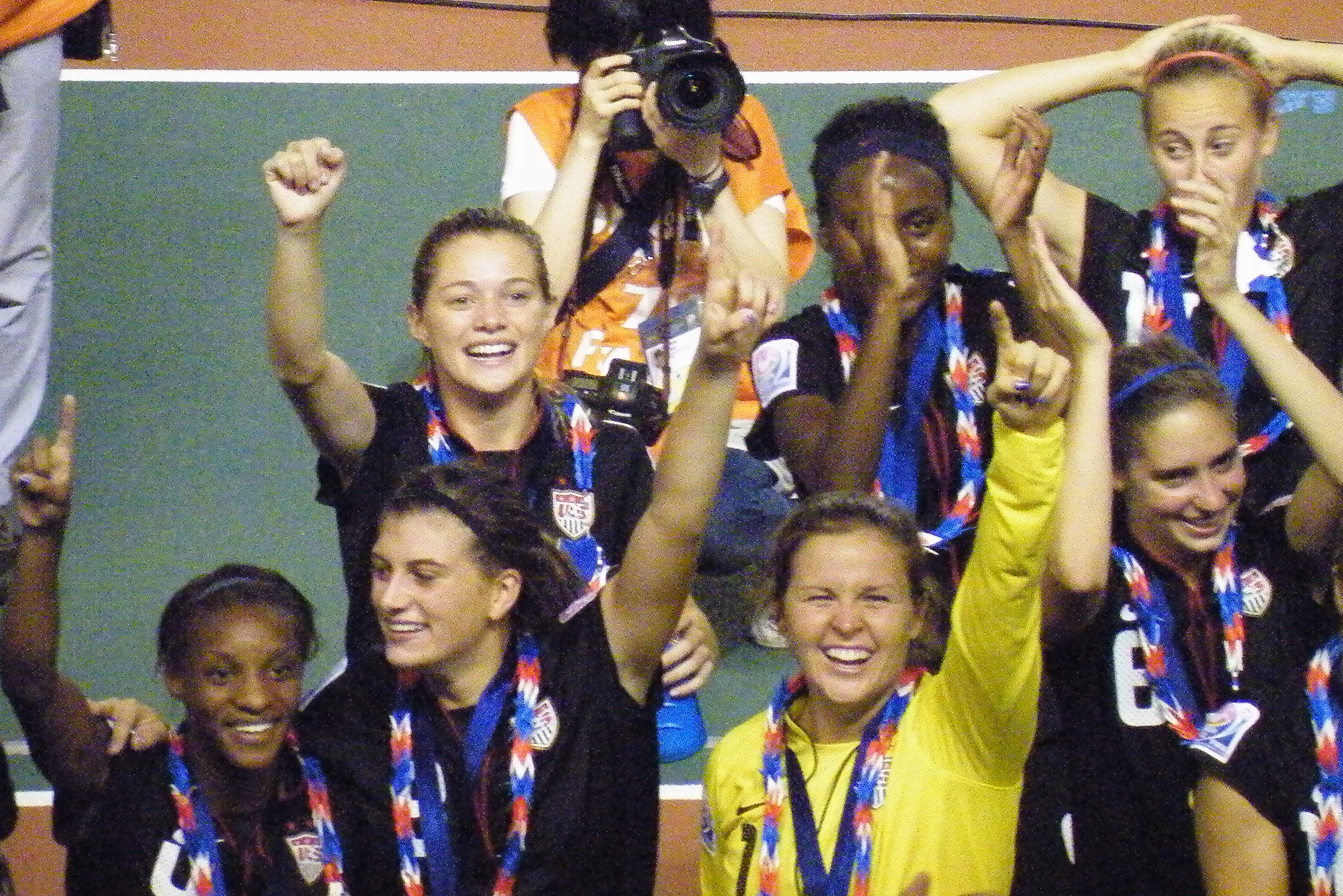
Watt (top left) with the U.S. team at the FIFA U-20 Women's World Cup in Japan, 2012.

A member of the U.S. youth national programs from the age of 13, Watt has played with the under-15, under-17, under-18, under-20, and the under-23 teams. As a member of the 2012 US U-20 Women's National Team, she won the 2012 FIFA U-20 Women's World Cup and scored the game-winning goal in the 44th minute of the final to lead the U.S. to victory over Germany.

Watt made her international debut for the senior team on October 23, 2016, against Switzerland in a friendly match in Minneapolis. She scored 48 seconds after entering the match as a substitute in the 81st minute, setting a record for the fastest goal in a US women's national team debut. She received a call-up in July 2018 to the team's training camp for the 2018 Tournament of Nations, her first call-up since injuring her knee in 2017, but did not make the final roster for the tournament.

== Post-soccer career ==
Watt was announced as a contributor and sideline analyst for Amazon's Prime Video broadcast of the NWSL in 2024. Her broadcast debut was on April 12, 2024 for a match between the Dash and the Washington Spirit.

== Personal life ==
Watt was born and raised in Utah. Her father Ben was an All-American wrestler at Brigham Young University in 1973 and 1974.

Watt is legally blind in her right eye. Her brother-in-law is former National Football League (NFL) Houston Texans player Brian Cushing.

In October 2016, Watt confirmed that she was in a relationship with NFL player J. J. Watt. They became engaged in May 2019. They were married on February 15, 2020, in the Bahamas, and Watt subsequently began using her married name. On October 23, 2022, Watt gave birth to her and J. J.'s first son Koa. Their second son, Niko Benjamin Watt, was born on June 14, 2025.

On May 1, 2023, the couple were announced as new minority investors in Burnley, which earned promotion from the EFL Championship to the Premier League for the 2023–24 season.

== Career statistics ==
=== Club ===
As of match played February 13, 2022

Appearances and goals by club, season and competition
Club	Season	League			Cup (Note: Includes the NWSL Challenge Cup)		Play-offs (Note: Includes the NWSL Playoffs)		Total	
Club	Season	Division	Apps	Goals	Apps	Goals	Apps	Goals	Apps	Goals
Houston Dash	2014	NWSL	23	4	—		—		23	4
Houston Dash	2015	NWSL	19	4	—		—		19	4
Houston Dash	2016	NWSL	20	11	—		—		20	11
Houston Dash	2017	NWSL	10	2	—		—		10	2
Houston Dash	2018	NWSL	19	5	—		—		19	5
Houston Dash	2019	NWSL	23	2	—		—		23	2
Houston Dash	Total		114	28	0	0	0	0	114	28
Chicago Red Stars	2020	NWSL Fall Series	4	2	6	0	—		10	2
Chicago Red Stars	2021	NWSL	24	5	4	0	2	0	30	5
Chicago Red Stars	2022	NWSL	0	0	0	0	0	0	0	0
Total			28	7	10	0	2	0	40	7
Career total			142	35	10	0	2	0	154	35

== Honors ==
North Carolina Tar Heels women's soccer team

- NCAA Division I Women's Soccer Championship: 2012

Chicago Red Stars

- NWSL Challenge Cup runner-up: 2020
- NWSL Championship runner-up: 2021

United States U20

- CONCACAF Women's U-20 Championship: 2012
- FIFA U-20 Women's World Cup: 2012

== See also ==
- List of University of North Carolina at Chapel Hill alumni
- List of American and Canadian soccer champions
- List of Senior CLASS Award women's soccer winners
