= Kimberly Keever =

American soccer player

Personal information
- Full name: Kimberly Anne Keever
- Date of birth: September 22, 1995 (age 31)
- Place of birth: Manhattan Beach, California, U.S.
- Height: 5 ft 5 in (1.65 m)
- Position: Defender

College career
Years	Team	Apps	(Gls)
2014–2017	Washington Huskies	79	(22)

Senior career*
Years	Team	Apps	(Gls)
2018	Houston Dash	11	(1)

International career
2017	United States U23		
- * Club domestic league appearances and goals

Kimberly Anne Keever (born September 22, 1995) is an American former soccer defender who played for the Houston Dash in the NWSL.

== Club career ==
Keever was selected by the Houston Dash with the 12th overall pick in the 2018 NWSL College Draft. She officially signed with the club on March 24. Keever was in the starting lineup for Houston's season opener on March 25 against the Chicago Red Stars and scored Houston's only goal in a 1–1 draw. Keever made 11 appearances for the Dash in 2018, she started 9 games and scored 1 goal.

On March 4, 2019, Houston announced that Keever had left the team and returned to the University of Washington.

== Career statistics ==
Appearances and goals by club, season and competition
Club	Season	League			Playoffs (Note: Includes NWSL playoffs)		Total	
Club	Season	Division	Apps	Goals	Apps	Goals	Apps	Goals
Houston Dash	2018	NWSL	11	1	—		11	1
Career total			11	1	0	0	11	1
