= Michaela Hahn =

American soccer player

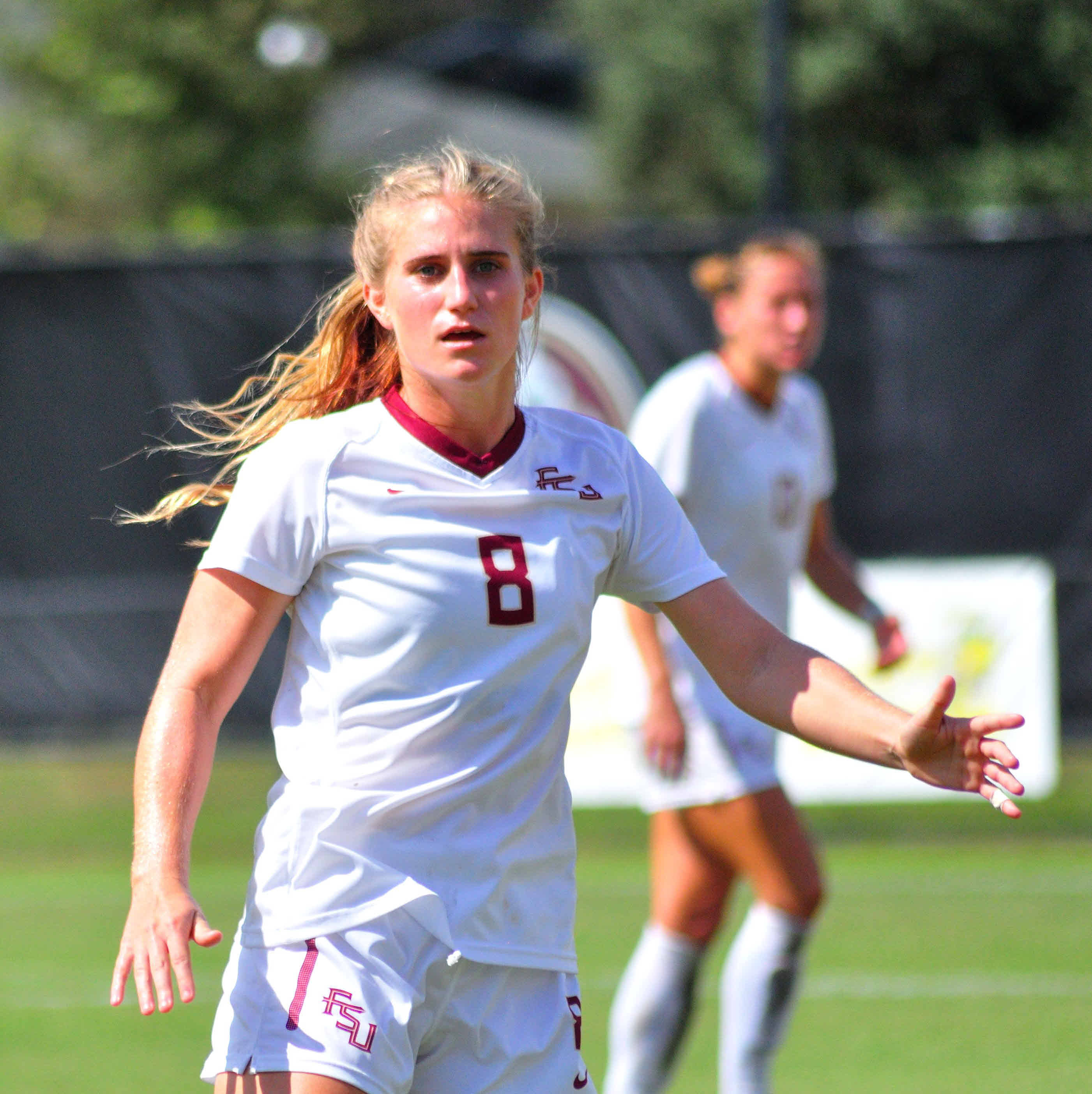
- Hahn during a match for the Florida State Seminoles, 2015

Personal information
- Full name: Michaela Elizabeth Hahn
- Date of birth: April 19, 1994 (age 32)
- Place of birth: Titusville, Florida, United States
- Height: 5 ft 4 in (1.63 m)
- Position: Midfielder

College career
Years	Team	Apps	(Gls)
2012–2015	Florida State Seminoles	103	(9)

Senior career*
Years	Team	Apps	(Gls)
2016	Western New York Flash	13	(1)
2017	Seattle Reign FC	0	(0)
2017	Apollon Ladies F.C.		
2018	Houston Dash	14	(1)

International career
2015–2016	United States U23		
- * Club domestic league appearances and goals as of August 16, 2018

Michaela Elizabeth Hahn (born April 19, 1994) is an American former soccer player. During her career she played for the Houston Dash, Western New York Flash and Seattle Reign FC in the NWSL. She has represented the United States on the under-23 national team. In 2014, she helped the Florida State Seminoles win their first-ever NCAA College Cup.

== Early life and education ==
Raised in Titusville, Florida, Hahn attended Titusville High School, where she played for the girls soccer team. She was named twice to the Florida Today All-Space Coast first team and earned All-Cape Coast conference team honors as a freshman. Hahn played club soccer for Space Coast United and helped the team win the U-19 elite Florida State Cup championship. She played for the state Olympic Development Program (ODP) team from 2007 to 2009 after participating in regional ODP camps from 2008 to 2009.

=== Florida State Seminoles, 2012–2015 ===
Hahn attended Florida State University, where she played for the Seminoles from 2012 to 2015. During her freshman season, she played in all 24 games, including two starts. Hahn scored her first collegiate goal in a match against College of Charleston. She played in all five of the Seminoles' 2012 NCAA College Cup games where they reached the semifinals and were eliminated by Penn State. During her sophomore season in 2013, Hahn made 27 starts in the 28 games in which she played and ranked third on the team in assists. She played in all six games of the 2013 NCAA College Cup and helped the team reach the finals where they were defeated by the UCLA Bruins 1–0 in overtime. Hahn finished the tournament with five points, including two goals and one assist.

Hahn started in 24 of the 26 games in which she played in the 2014 season and helped the Seminoles win the 2014 NCAA College Cup. As a senior, Hahn was a starting midfielder in all of the Seminoles' games and scored five goals, including two during the 2015 NCAA College Cup. Her defensive skills helped the Seminoles set new NCAA Tournament records with 10 consecutive shutouts and a consecutive scoreless streak of 931:47. She earned NSCAA All-Southeast Region Third Team, All-ACC Third Team, and NSCAA Scholar All-South Region Third Team honors.

Hahn finished her collegiate career with 103 appearances which tied for second in the school's history and tied for tenth in NCAA history.

== Club career ==
In January 2016, Hahn was selected as the ninth pick of the 2016 NWSL College Draft by the Western New York Flash. During her rookie year, she made 13 appearances and scored one goal.

Following the team's move to North Carolina after the 2016 season, Hahn participated in training camp and pre-season with the North Carolina Courage, but was waived prior to the start of the 2017 NWSL season. On April 11, 2017, she was claimed off waivers by Seattle Reign FC. She was waived by the Seattle Reign on July 18, 2017. Later in 2017, Hahn signed for Apollon Limassol of the Cypriot First Division and UEFA Women's Champions League.

On January 31, 2018 she signed with the Houston Dash.

On August 16, 2018 Hahn announced her retirement for professional soccer in order to pursue a master's degree in Sports Management at Florida State University.

== International career ==
Hahn has represented the United States on the under-23 national team.

== Honors ==
Western New York Flash

- NWSL Championship: 2016

== See also ==
- List of Florida State University people
