= Lauren Kaskie =

American soccer player (born 1995)

Personal information
- Full name: Lauren Alissa Kaskie
- Date of birth: September 18, 1995 (age 31)
- Place of birth: Reno, Nevada
- Height: 5 ft 5 in (1.65 m)
- Position: Midfielder

College career
Years	Team	Apps	(Gls)
2013–2016	UCLA Bruins	91	(3)

Senior career*
Years	Team	Apps	(Gls)
2017–2018	Chicago Red Stars	13	(1)
2018	Hammarby	6	(0)

International career
2011–2012	United States U17		
2013–2014	United States U20		
- * Club domestic league appearances and goals

Lauren Alissa Kaskie (born September 18, 1995) is an American soccer player who played as a midfielder. She previously played for the Chicago Red Stars in the NWSL and Hammarby in the Damallsvenskan.

== Youth career ==
Kaskie was an UCLA Bruin between 2013 and 2016, and earned Pac-12 All-Academic acclaim in 2015, as well as 2016. While in high-school, Kaskie played club soccer for LV Heat and had won three state titles with other teams.

== Club career ==
Kaskie was drafted by the Chicago Red Stars with the 39th pick in the 2017 NWSL College Draft. She appeared in seven games for Chicago during the 2017 NWSL season.

On March 25, 2018, Kaskie made her 2018 season debut for Chicago in a 1–1 draw against the Houston Dash. Kaskie scored her first professional goal on April 18, 2018, against Houston Dash in 3–0 victory at Toyota Park.

On June 16, 2018, Kaskie was released by the Red Stars.

Kaskie signed with Hammarby in the Sweden Damallsvenskan on August 12, 2018.
