= Nikki Stanton =

American soccer player (born 1990)

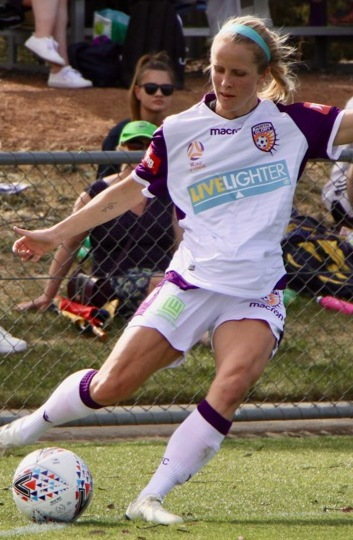
- Stanton with Perth Glory in 2018

Personal information
- Full name: Nicole Leslie Stanton
- Date of birth: October 26, 1990 (age 36)
- Place of birth: North Bend, Washington, United States
- Height: 5 ft 7 in (1.70 m)
- Position: Midfielder

Team information
- Current team: Vancouver Rise
- Number: 7

College career
Years	Team	Apps	(Gls)
2009–2013	Fairfield Stags	79	(6)

Senior career*
Years	Team	Apps	(Gls)
2012	Seattle Sounders		
2014–2017	Sky Blue FC	41	(0)
2015	ETG Ambilly FFC		
2015–2019	→ Perth Glory (loan)	45	(0)
2018–2019	Chicago Red Stars	40	(0)
2020	Klepp IL	15	(2)
2021	Chicago Red Stars	14	(0)
2022–2024	Seattle Reign	35	(0)
2025–	Vancouver Rise	19	(0)
- * Club domestic league appearances and goals as of 17 October 2025

Nicole Leslie Stanton (born October 26, 1990) is an American professional soccer player who plays as a midfielder for Vancouver Rise FC of the Northern Super League.

== Early life ==
Raised in North Bend, Washington about 40 minutes east of Seattle, Stanton attended Mount Si High School where she played for the girls varsity soccer team for four years. As team captain during her senior year, she received the school's Female Athlete of the Year honors and was selected to the All-Star Select Team by the Seattle Post-Intelligencer.

Stanton played club soccer for Crossfire Premier and helped lead the team to five state titles and a regional championship in 2006. She was also a member of the regional Olympic Development Program (ODP).

== Club career ==
=== Seattle Sounders, 2012 ===
Stanton played for the Seattle Sounders during the summer of 2012.

=== Sky Blue FC, 2014–2017 ===
Stanton was signed by Sky Blue FC in June 2014 after playing for the team's reserve team and made 4 appearances in her rookie season. She re-signed with Sky Blue on October 23, 2015.

On January 18, 2018, Stanton was traded to the Chicago Red Stars along with teammate and former partner Sam Kerr as part of a three-team trade.

==== ETG Ambilly FFC, 2015 ====
Stanton spent two months with ETG Ambilly FFC in 2015 as part of the Play Football Abroad Program.

==== Loan to Perth Glory, 2015–2019 ====
Following the 2015 NWSL season, Stanton went on loan to Perth Glory for the 2015-16 W-League season. Stanton returned to Perth for the 2016-17 W-League where she once again played every minute of the season. Perth advanced to the 2017 W-League Grand Final but lost to Melbourne City 2–0.

Stanton returned to Perth for the 2017-18 W-League season. She suffered a broken arm in a game on November 5, 2017, which forced her to miss a month of the season. Stanton re-signed with Perth for the 2018-19 W-League season, her fourth season with the team. Perth returned to the Grand Final in 2019 but lost to Sydney FC 4–2.

=== Chicago Red Stars, 2018–2019, 2021 ===
In her first season with Chicago, Stanton played in 20 games for the Red Stars. She advanced to the NWSL play-offs for the first time in her career as the Red Stars finished fourth and qualified for the play-offs.

=== OL Reign / Seattle Reign, 2022–2024 ===
In 2022, Stanton won the NWSL Shield and The Women's Cup invitational tournament during her first season at OL Reign.

=== Vancouver Rise, 2025– ===
On January 9, 2025 it was announced that Stanton had signed with Vancouver Rise of Northern Super League On July 19, 2025, Stanton came off the bench and was initially credited with scoring her first goal for the club in a 6-0 victory against Halifax Tides FC (however, later it was changed to an own goal). On November 15, 2025, she was substituted on in the inaugural NSL Final, replacing the injured Quinn, and took a corner which prompted an AFC Toronto own goal, helping the Rise to a 2–1 victory over AFC Toronto which won them the 2025 Diana B. Matheson Cup. Stanton was awarded the club's inaugural Together We Rise Award. On March 2, 2026, Stanton was named to the Rise's preseason roster ahead of the 2026 season.

== Honors ==
- The Women's Cup: 2022
- NWSL Shield: 2022
- Diana B. Matheson Cup: 2025

== Personal life ==
She was previously in a relationship with former Perth Glory and Chicago Red Stars teammate Sam Kerr.

In 2024, Stanton appeared in the first season of The Offseason, a reality television series following a group of NWSL players training before the new season.
