= Savannah Jordan =

American soccer player (born 1995)

Personal information
- Full name: Savannah Brooke Jordan
- Date of birth: January 24, 1995 (age 31)
- Place of birth: Fayetteville, Georgia, United States
- Height: 5 ft 7 in (1.70 m)
- Position: Forward

College career
Years	Team	Apps	(Gls)
2013–2016	Florida Gators	94	(81)

Senior career*
Years	Team	Apps	(Gls)
2017	Glasgow City		
2017	Portland Thorns	2	(0)
2018	Houston Dash	10	(0)

International career
2013–2014	United States U20		
2015–2016	United States U23		
- * Club domestic league appearances and goals as of August 18, 2018

Savannah Brooke Jordan (born January 24, 1995) is an American retired soccer forward who last played for the Houston Dash in the National Women's Soccer League (NWSL). She also played for Glasgow City in the Scottish Women's Premier League (SWPL) and Portland Thorns FC in the NWSL. Jordan played collegiate soccer for the Florida Gators women's soccer team and was the first player in the history of the Southeastern Conference to be named SEC Offensive Player of the Year as a freshman. Jordan has a background in martial arts and is a three-time U.S. Junior Olympic gold medalist in sparring.

== Early life ==
Raised in Fayetteville, Georgia, Jordan attended Whitewater High School where she played soccer during her junior year. She did not play for the school during the other high school years due to commitments with the Georgia Olympic Development Program (ODP) where she captained the state team for five years. During her season with the school's team, she led the team to runners-up of the 2012 Georgia High School Association (GHSA) Class AAAA and was named most valuable player (MVP) of the final match. After scoring 26 goals and recording 21 assists during the season, she was named to the all-state and all-region teams and was a finalist for Gatorade Player of the Year for the state of Georgia.

Jordan played club soccer for Concorde Fire South '95 Elite and captained the team for five seasons. She was named to the Elite Clubs National League (ECNL) national and ECNL All-Event teams five times.

Around the age of ten, Jordan began training in martial arts, fighting against boys. She earned a second-degree black belt in Korean style taekwondo and won three gold medals at the U.S. Junior Olympics in sparring. Jordan attributes her aggressive playing style to her martial arts background.

=== University of Florida ===
Jordan attended the University of Florida where she played for the Florida Gators from 2013 to 2016. During her freshman season, she was the team's top scorer with 22 goals and tied for the lead in the Southeastern Conference. Her goals tied for third nationwide and ranked second all-time for Gator freshmen behind Abby Wambach. Jordan was named SEC Freshman of the Week three times and earned All-SEC first team and SEC All-Freshman team honors. Jordan was named National Freshman of the Year Soccer America and TopDrawerSoccer.com. She was the first player in the history of the conference to be named SEC Offensive Player of the Year as a freshman.

During her sophomore season, Jordan's 19 goals ranked eighth in NCAA Division 1. She scored four braces (two games in a match) and her 46 points ranked seventh in the NCAA. Named a semifinalist for the Hermann Trophy, she was named SEC Offensive Player of the Week three times.

As a junior in 2015, Jordan scored 24 goals ranking second in the nation and leading the Southeastern Conference. Jordan's goals through her first three seasons matched that of former Gator Abby Wambach. She was named to the NSCAA All-America first team and earned NSCAA All-South Region first team, All-SEC first team, and SEC All-Tournament team honors. Jordan was named SEC Offensive Player of the Year for the second time as well as Hero Sports' National Offensive Player of the Year. She was named Soccer Player of the Week by ESPN. She was named a MAC Hermann Trophy semifinalist for the second time.

During her senior season, Jordan scored 16 goals and ranked second in the Southeastern Conference in goals and points. She was named SEC Offensive Player of the Week twice. Jordan was named to the All-Southeastern Conference first team for fourth consecutive year joining Abby Wambach as the only other player at Florida to have done so. She was the first Gator in the program's history to be named NSCAA All-American for four consecutive years.

== Club career ==
=== Portland Thorns, 2017 ===
In January 2017, Jordan was selected as the eighteenth pick of the 2017 NWSL College Draft by Portland Thorns FC although she had confirmed she would first be playing in Europe. Thorns head coach Mark Parsons said of the signing, "Savannah is a very hard-working forward with the ability to create and score goals in many ways. We are excited to bring her to Portland and look forward to seeing Savannah's development and impact in the Rose City." Later that month, she signed with Glasgow City F.C. for the 2017 Scottish Women's Premier League season. During her debut with Glasgow, she scored a hat-trick. She scored another hat-trick during her second match.

Jordan joined the Thorns in August during the second half of the 2017 National Women's Soccer League season after recovering from an injury. Jordan made two appearances for the Thorns during the regular season. The Thorns finished in second place during the regular season with 14–5–5 record and won the league championship after defeating first place club North Carolina Courage.

=== Houston Dash, 2018 ===
On January 12, 2018, Jordan was traded to the Houston Dash in exchange for Andressinha. Jordan made 10 appearances for the Dash in 2018. On March 4, 2019, Houston announced that Jordan had retired from professional soccer.

== International career ==
Jordan has represented the United States on the under-17, under-20, and under-23 national teams. She competed at the 2014 CONCACAF Women's U-20 Championship in the Cayman Islands and helped lead the team to win the championship and earn a spot at the 2014 FIFA U-20 Women's World Cup. During the CONCACAF championship, Jordan scored once in each of the five matches and ranked second on the team in goals. She was subsequently named to the tournaments' Best XI team.

In 2015, Jordan competed with the under-23 team at the Four Nations Tournament in Norway. The following year, she played in every match at the Nordic Tournament in England and scored three goals.

== Honors ==
- 2013 Soccer National Freshman of the Year
- 2015 SEC Offensive Player of the Year
