= Taylor Comeau =

American retired soccer player

Personal information
- Full name: Taylor Kay Rene Comeau
- Date of birth: July 21, 1993 (age 33)
- Place of birth: Los Gatos, California
- Height: 5 ft 6 in (1.68 m)
- Position: Midfielder

College career
Years	Team	Apps	(Gls)
2011–2014	California Golden Bears	84	(10)

Senior career*
Years	Team	Apps	(Gls)
2014	Seattle Sounders Women		
2015	Portland Thorns FC	9	(0)
2016–2018	Chicago Red Stars	47	(2)
2018–2019	Houston Dash	13	(0)
- * Club domestic league appearances and goals

Taylor Kay Rene Comeau (born July 21, 1993) is an American retired soccer player who played as a midfielder. She played for Portland Thorns FC, Chicago Red Stars, and Houston Dash in the National Women's Soccer League (NWSL).

== Early life ==
Taylor Comeau attended Los Gatos High School. Comeau played for California Golden Bears in Pac-12 Conference during her college years.

== Playing career ==
=== Portland Thorns FC, 2015 ===
Comeau appeared in 9 games for Portland in 2015 as an amateur call-up to cover for Thorns players missing for International duty.

=== Chicago Red Stars, 2016–2018 ===
Comeau was named to the 2016 Chicago Red Stars final roster, after having been a trialist. On July 16, 2016, in her second start for Chicago Red Stars Taylor Comeau scored a crucial goal in a 1–0 away win over Orlando Pride; which positioned the Red Stars in solitary possession of fourth place in 2016 National Women's Soccer League season putting the team on track to a playoff spot. On June 18, 2018, Comeau was traded alongside Sofia Huerta to the Houston Dash as part of a three team trade that also included the Utah Royals FC

=== Houston Dash, 2018–2019 ===
After being acquired midseason by the Dash, Comeau made her debut for Houston on June 22 against Portland Thorns FC.

=== Retirement ===
Comeau announced her retirement on June 18, 2019.
