= List of Portland Thorns FC seasons =

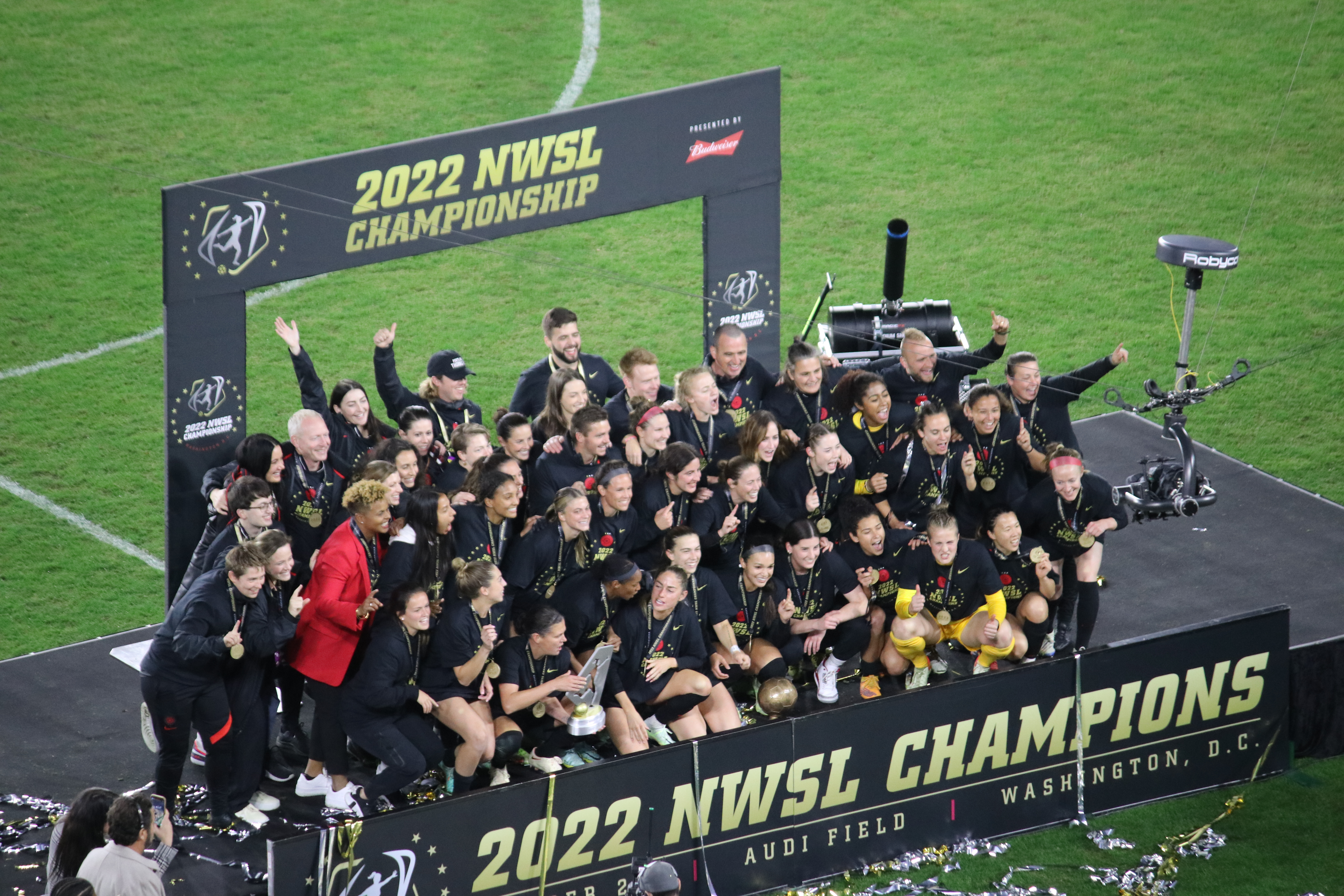
Thorns players and staff celebrate winning the 2022 NWSL Championship at Audi Field.

This is a list of all seasons played by Portland Thorns FC in the National Women's Soccer League (NWSL), from their inaugural season in 2013 to their last completed season in 2022. It details their record in every major competition entered, as well as the top goalscorers for each season.

The club have won every major NWSL trophy. Portland was the first team to win three NWSL Championships, the third to win two NWSL Shields, and won the 2021 NWSL Challenge Cup. The Thorns also won the 2020 NWSL Fall Series Community Shield and 2021 Women's International Champions Cup, and Thorns players have been named the league's most valuable player twice (Lindsey Horan in 2018, Sophia Smith in 2022).

== 2013 ==
Under head coach Cindy Parlow Cone, the Thorns played in the new league's inaugural game on April 13, 2013, against host team FC Kansas City, which ended in a 1–1 draw in which Christine Sinclair scored the club's first goal on a penalty kick. The team's first home match on April 21 provided the club its first victory, a 2–1 win over Seattle Reign FC. Beyond setting a new league record, the home opener crowd of 16,479 at Jeld-Wen Field eclipsed any single-game attendance from Women's Professional Soccer. Subsequently, the team's regular-season home finale of 17,619 topped the previous mark of 16,479 and also ranked at the time among the top single-game marks in women's professional soccer history in the United States.

The Thorns were also an attendance draw on the road. Portland's road games were witnessed by season-high attendance figures or sellout crowds, including a record-setting crowd at the Maryland SoccerPlex against the Washington Spirit on May 4. A total of 5,011 people were in attendance, besting the previous record for a women's game at the Soccerplex by more than 300 and about 500 more than normal capacity.

On August 28, 2013, the NWSL named Thorns FC forwards Christine Sinclair and Alex Morgan, and defender Rachel Buehler, to the league's second-team Best XI.

The club finished in a three-way tie atop the league in the regular-season standings, but by virtue of goal differential tiebreaker, the club claimed the No. 3 seed in the NWSL playoffs. In the first round of playoffs on August 24, the Thorns beat FC Kansas City 3–2 after extra time. A week later they beat the Western New York Flash 2–0 in the championship game, with Tobin Heath and Christine Sinclair scoring the two goals and the Thorns overcoming the red-card ejection of defender Kat Williamson in the 57th minute, to become the first NWSL Champions.

After the end of the season, Parlow Cone resigned as head coach on December 5, 2013. She cited personal reasons, particularly a desire to spend more time with her husband, Portland Timbers director of sports science John Cone, who also resigned around the same time.

== 2014 ==
The Thorns kicked off their 2014 season with the announcement of a new head coach, Paul Riley, formerly of the Long Island Fury of the Women's Premier Soccer League. The team traded goalkeeper Karina LeBlanc to the Chicago Red Stars and replaced her with 2013 FIFA World Player of the Year recipient Nadine Angerer, and in April traded Kat Williamson, Courtney Wetzel, and a first-round pick in the 2015 NWSL College Draft to the Flash for defender Sarah Huffman and the right to sign Spanish international Verónica Boquete.

The Thorns broke the club's own NWSL attendance record with 19,123 attending an August 3 game between Portland and expansion team Houston Dash at newly renamed Providence Park. After finishing third in the regular season, the Thorns qualified for the playoffs but were knocked out in the semi-finals by FC Kansas City.

== 2015 ==
The Thorns made a number of roster moves in the offseason. In November 2014, the Thorns traded Amber Brooks to the Western New York Flash to re-acquire Kat Williamson and acquire midfielder McCall Zerboni. The team also traded the 25th and 34th-overall picks in the 2015 draft to Sky Blue FC in exchange for defender Kendall Johnson, a Portland native and former University of Portland standout, and traded the 13th-overall 2015 pick and two second-round 2016 NWSL College Draft picks to the Washington Spirit in exchange for English international forward Jodie Taylor, who had played at Oregon State and was among the league's goalscoring leaders during the 2014 NWSL season.

Portland also signed Equatorial Guinea international forward Genoveva Añonman, who had made 122 appearances and scored 95 goals for in the German Frauen-Bundesliga, and midfielder Sarah Robbins from Åland United, champions of Finland's Naisten Liiga.

As part of the National Team player allocation process, Portland received Canadian international midfielder Kaylyn Kyle and defender Rhian Wilkinson.

In February, defender Nikki Marshall announced her retirement from professional soccer. In her two seasons with the Thorns, Marshall, 26, appeared in a club-record 46 consecutive regular-season matches, playing 3,943 minutes.

On June 19, 2015, the Thorns made NWSL history when goalkeeper Michelle Betos headed the equalizing goal for 10-woman Portland in the 95th minute against FC Kansas City, the first goal scored by a goalkeeper in the league. The Thorns also sold out Providence Park for the first time in a match against Seattle Reign FC following the 2015 FIFA Women's World Cup, again setting the league's attendance record with 21,144.

However, the Thorns finished in 6th place of the now 9-team league, missing the playoffs for the first and only time in its history. At the end of the season the team announced that head coach Paul Riley's contract was allowed to expire, though reports in 2021 would reveal that Riley had been investigated for alleged sexual harassment and coercion and quietly terminated.

On October 5, the Thorns hired Washington Spirit head coach Mark Parsons as head coach for the 2016 season. In December, the club brought Angerer back as its goalkeeping coach.

== 2016 ==
In Parsons's first season in charge, the Thorns executed a series of trades — anchored by moving founding forward Alex Morgan and midfielder Kaylyn Kyle to expansion team Orlando Pride — that resulted in the acquisitions of defender Emily Sonnett in the 2016 NWSL College Draft, Lindsey Horan via allocation from Paris Saint-Germain, Meghan Klingenberg through as an Orlando pick-and-trade during the 2016 NWSL Expansion Draft, goalkeeper Adrianna Franch's rights from the Boston Breakers, and international slots used to sign Olympique Lyonnais Féminin midfielder and France national team Capitan Amandine Henry and Icelandic international midfielder Dagný Brynjarsdóttir, and Danish international forward Nadia Nadim acquired from Sky Blue FC. Parsons also signed former Washington Spirit winger Hayley Raso off waivers and acquired Meg Morris from Sky Blue. At the start of the 2016 preseason, only eight players from the 2015 team remained on the roster.

The acquisitions formed the core of a team that won the Thorns its first NWSL Shield in 2016, which allowed it to host its first playoff match, against a Western New York Flash team led by former Thorns coach Paul Riley. The physical match, with a playoff-record 20,086 in attendance, ended in regulation as a 2–2 draw, and the Thorns lost in a 4–3 upset after extra time.

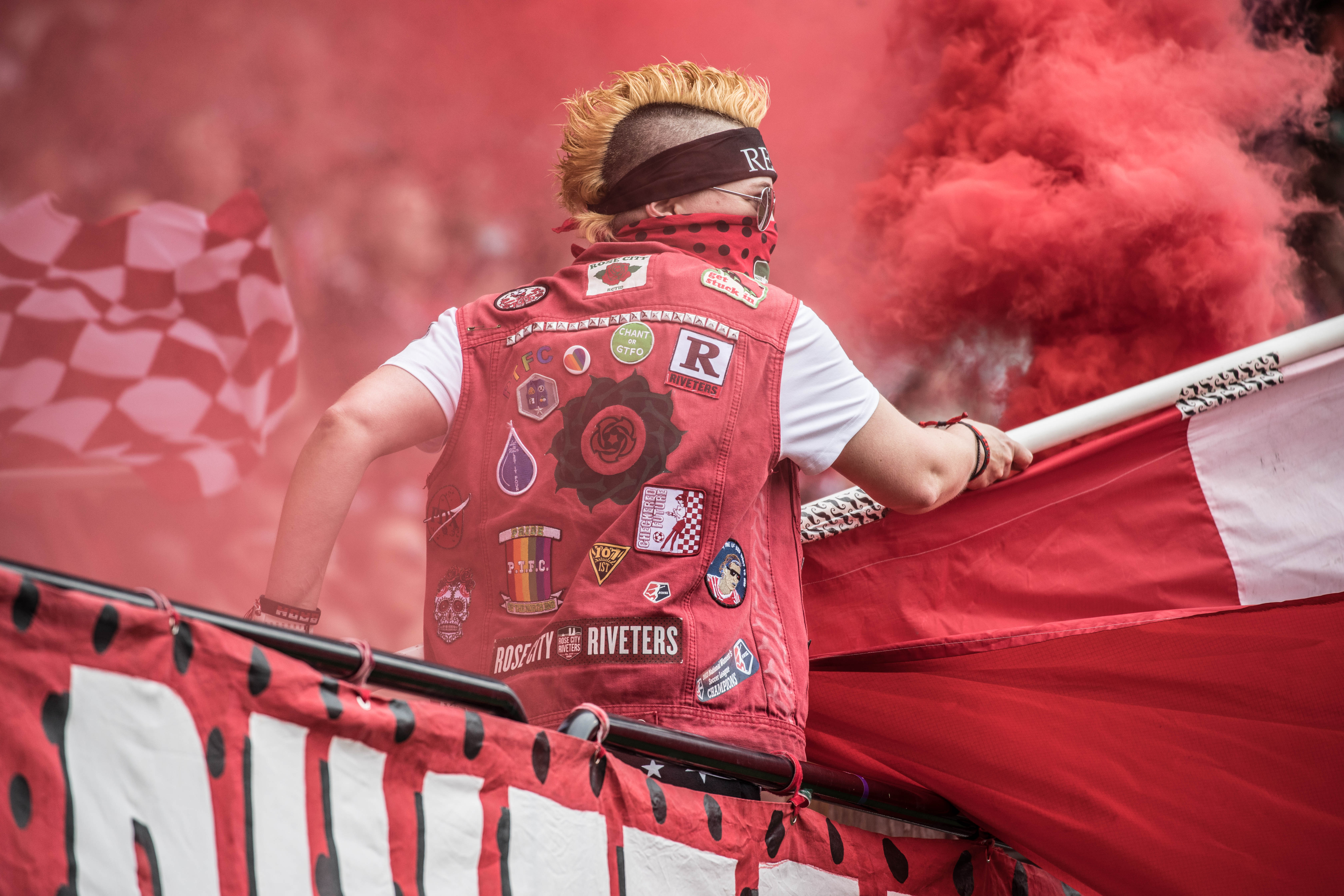
A member of the Rose City Riveters supporters' group waves a flag amid smoke after the Thorns score a goal in April 2017.

== 2017 ==
The Thorns retained most of their roster from 2016, with Kat Williamson retiring and Betos declining the Thorns' contract offer to play for Vålerenga in Norway. Heath missed much of the season with a back injury, forcing Sinclair into a deeper attacking midfield role, and Franch stepped into the starting keeper role, with the Thorns' defense leading the league in shutouts.

After a 14–5–5 league record and 47 points for a second-place finish behind the NWSL Shield-winning North Carolina Courage, successor to the Western New York Flash team that had beaten them in the final the year before, the Thorns defeated the Orlando Pride 4–1 in a playoff semi-final. In the championship match, Portland defeated the Courage at Orlando City Stadium in a physical 1–0 match to win their second NWSL championship. Following the victory, the team held a victory rally in Providence Park.

== 2018 ==
The Thorns lost Henry and Nadim to Olympique Lyon and Manchester City, respectively, as the NWSL salary cap of $315,000 for each team prevented the Thorns from offering competitive salaries. On January 11, 2018, the team announced a trade that would send midfielder Allie Long to Seattle Reign FC in exchange for the rights to Australian international defender Caitlin Foord. Long had been with the team since its inaugural season, and was one of the first players to reach 100 NWSL appearances with one club. With Long's departure, Tobin Heath and Christine Sinclair were the only remaining players from the first Thorns season.

The team signed Australian fullback Ellie Carpenter to play for the Thorns on her 18th birthday, and traded the team's previous year's top draft pick Savannah Jordan to Houston Dash for Brazilian international midfielder Andressinha. The team also acquired Boston Breakers players Margaret Purce, Ifeoma Onumonu, and Angela Salem in the 2018 NWSL Dispersal Draft.

The Thorns finished with a regular season record of 12–6–6 and matched their second-place finish from the previous season, again finishing behind the Courage. The Thorns beat Seattle Reign FC 2–1 in the playoff semi-finals to stage a rematch against the Courage, rematch of the previous seasons final. The match drew a sellout attendance of 21,144, breaking the league playoff attendance record that the Thorns had set in the previous season. However, the Thorns lost to the Courage 3–0, and North Carolina became the first team to win the NWSL Shield and the NWSL Playoffs in the same season.

== 2019 ==
Before the start of the season, the Thorns announced that the team would play its first six games on the road due to ongoing renovations and expansions of Providence Park. The Thorns lost only one of their first six games, then lost once in a nine-game stretch spanning June and July. This run included the return of several key players who had missed time for the FIFA Women's World Cup, including Lindsey Horan, the reigning NWSL MVP, and team captain Christine Sinclair. The Thorns fine form was encapsulated by a 5–0 rout of the Houston Dash on July 24. Beginning the month of September at the top of the table and contenders for the NWSL Shield, the team entered what would be the worst run of form since Mark Parsons was named head coach. Portland would lose three of their final five games, including an embarrassing 6–0 loss to the North Carolina Courage which would end up as the most lopsided loss in team history. After finishing the season with a scoreless draw against the Washington Spirit, the Thorns finished third in the league, meaning they would not host a playoff game for the first time since 2015. The Thorns would be knocked out of the playoffs after a 1–0 defeat to the Chicago Red Stars.

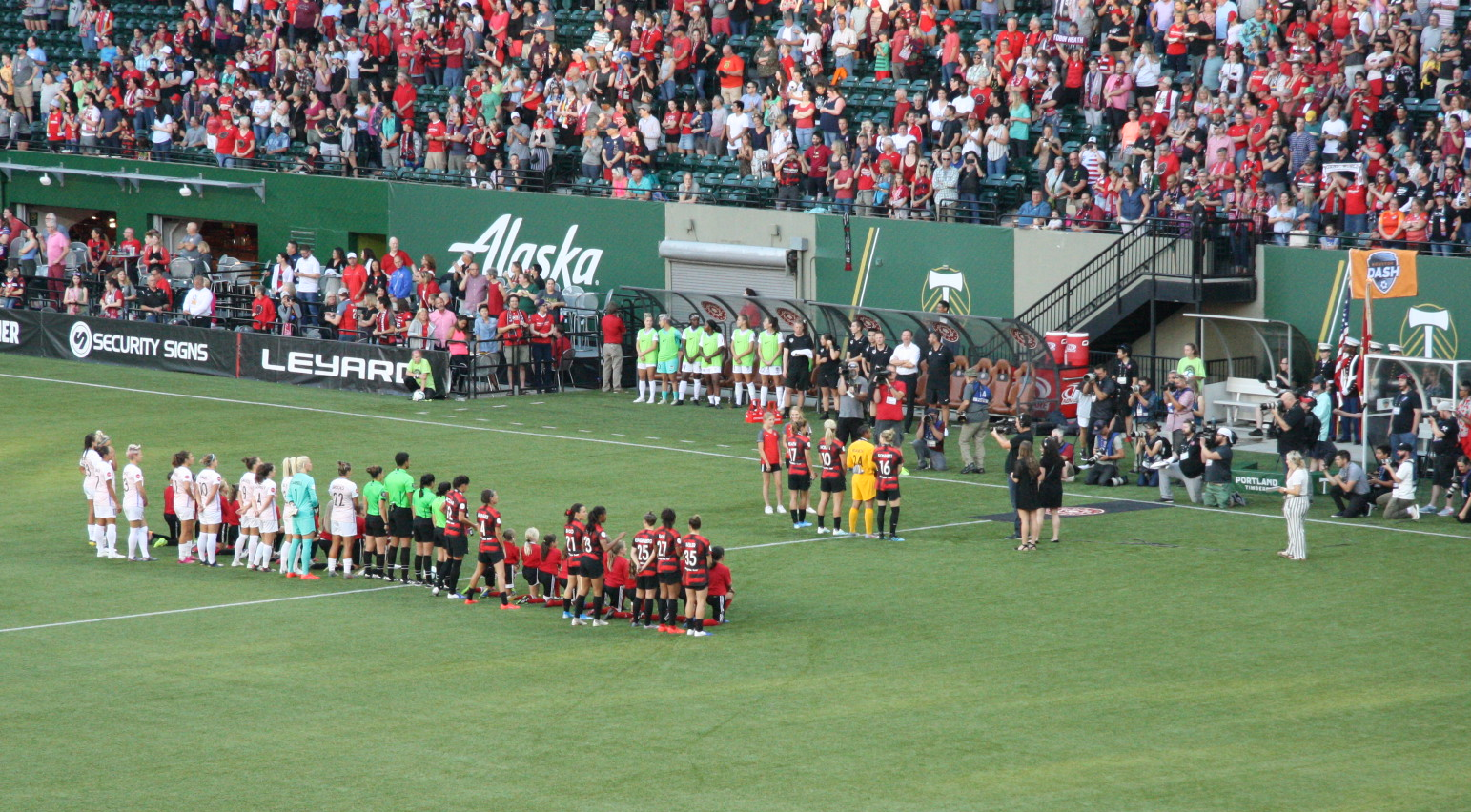
Four Thorns players who won the Women's World Cup with the U.S. National Team were recognized upon their return to Portland, prior to the July 24 match against the Houston Dash.

== 2020 ==
Due to the COVID-19 pandemic, on March 12, 2020, the Thorns canceled their preseason tournament, scheduled for March 29-April 4. On March 20, 2020, the NWSL postponed the start of the league's regular season indefinitely. The Thorns participated in the inaugural NWSL Challenge Cup, defeating the North Carolina Courage in the quarterfinals but losing to the eventual champions Houston Dash in the semifinals. The Thorns also participated in and clinched the 2020 NWSL Fall Series Community Shield with a win on October 11, 2020, over OL Reign.

== 2021 ==
=== Abuse scandal ===
In late-September, The Athletic published an investigation into North Carolina Courage head coach Paul Riley, alleging that Riley had sexually coerced and verbally abused players on his teams, including during his two-year tenure as Thorns head coach in 2014 and 2015. More than a dozen players from every team Riley had coached since 2010 spoke to the publication and two named players, both former Thorns, went on the record with allegations against him. In the article, Riley denied the allegations. The article also stated that NWSL failed to act on Riley's alleged abuses multiple times, including earlier in 2021 when the league declined to act on an offer from two of Riley's alleged victims to assist in investigating Riley's alleged abuses. Later that day, the Courage announced that Riley had been fired due to "very serious allegations of misconduct". The Thorns front office released a statement the same day citing that some of the incidents occurred during Riley's two-year tenure as head coach of the Thorns and discussing their reaction to the incidents at the time.

The subsequent fallout resulted in the resignation of league commissioner Lisa Baird and dismissal of league counsel Lisa Levine. A number of Portland Thorns players also released a statement calling for Thorns general manager Gavin Wilkinson to be suspended. Wilkinson was subsequently put on administrative leave from the Thorns, but remained manager of the MLS Portland Timbers. Wilkinson was reinstated in January 2022 following an internal business review, however, due to ongoing league, union, and federation investigations, no players could be interviewed, and the players association disavowed any connection between the internal review and other investigations.

The US Soccer Federation commissioned a league-wide independent investigation into abusive behavior led by Sally Yates. The report, published on October 3, 2022, indicates that the club "interfered with our access to relevant witnesses and raised specious legal arguments in an attempt to impede our use of relevant documents." The report further details how both Paulson and Wilkinson advised other clubs to hire Riley after his departure from the Thorns. According to the report, Wilkinson "told the Flash that Riley was 'put in a bad position by the player,' and that Wilkinson would 'hire [Riley] in a heartbeat.'" Paulson congratulated the Flash on hiring Riley in an email to club's president, stating "congrats on the Riley hire. I have a lot of affection for him.” When contacted by NC Courage ownership about hiring Riley, Paulson downplayed the abuse of Portland Thorn's players saying it "basically was [a case of] ‘poor judgment'" and described difficulty managing the roster as the reason for Riley's departure from Portland.

=== Competitions ===
The Thorns competed in and won the West Division of the 2021 NWSL Challenge Cup, advancing from the group stage to host the finals on May 8, 2021, against NJ/NY Gotham FC. After drawing the finals in regulation 1–1, the Thorns defeated Gotham in penalties 6–5 to claim the cup. Morgan Weaver scored the match-winning penalty.

The Thorns qualified for the 2021 Women's International Champions Cup as champions of the 2020 Fall Series, and won the tournament by defeating three-time finalists and defending champions Olympique Lyon 1–0. Morgan Weaver scored the match-winning goal in regulation. Portland also hosted the friendly tournament.

The Thorns clinched their second NWSL Shield on October 17, earning a first-round bye to the 2021 NWSL playoffs, but lost in the semi-finals to the Chicago Red Stars.

Head coach Mark Parsons, who had served since 2016, left the team after the 2021 season to lead the Netherlands women's national football team. His hiring had been announced during the season in May.

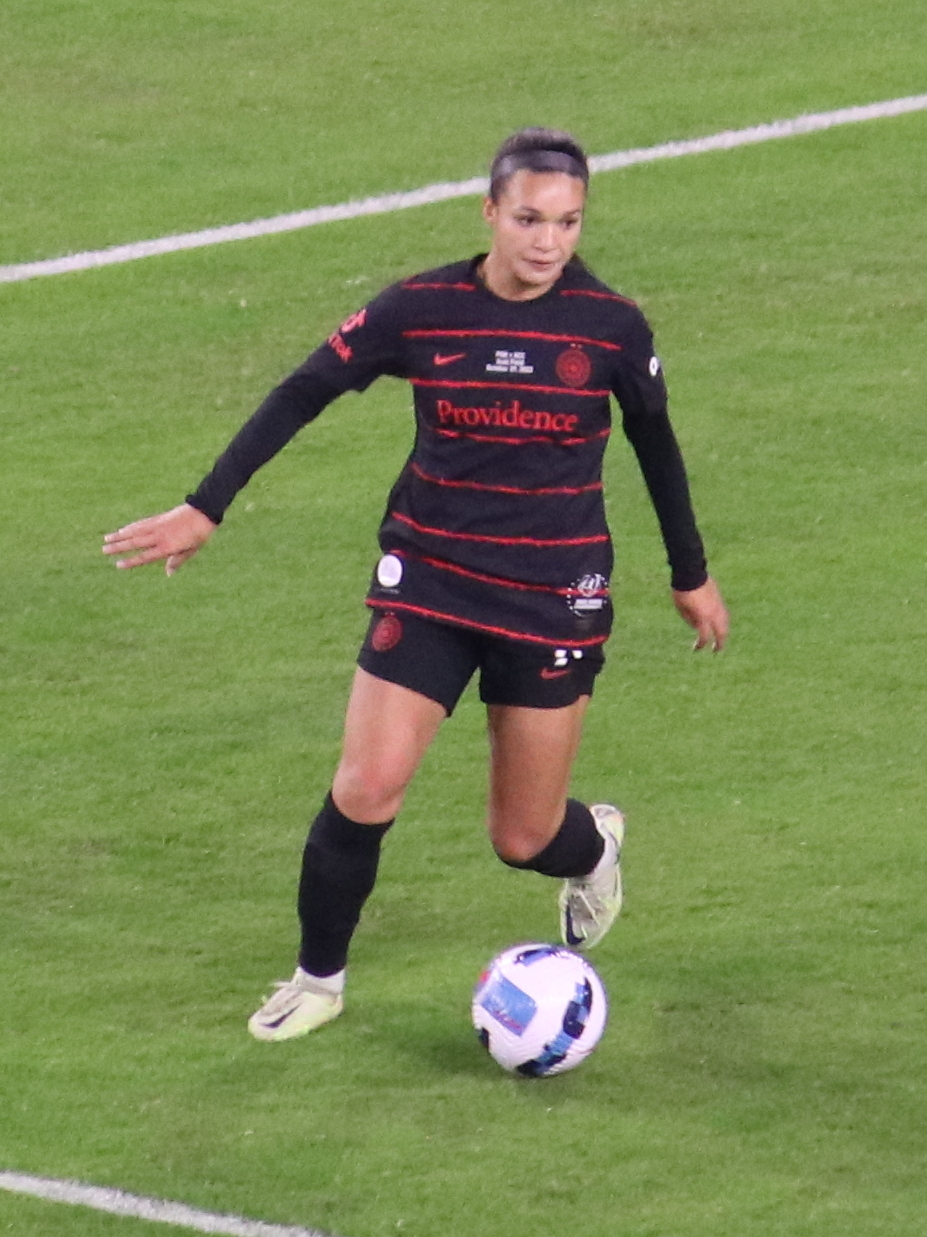
Thorns player Sophia Smith was named most valuable player of both the 2022 NWSL season and the 2022 NWSL championship finals.

== 2022 ==
The Thorns hired retired former club goalkeeper and Canadian international Karina LeBlanc as Gavin Wilkinson's replacement in the Thorns general manager role on November 2, 2021.

Following Mark Parsons's exit, the Thorns hired one of the club's former players from Paul Riley's tenure, Rhian Wilkinson, as his replacement. Wilkinson had also played on the Canadian national team as a teammate of LeBlanc and longtime Thorns FC and Canadian team captain Christine Sinclair. After her playing career, Wilkinson had been an assistant coach for the Canadian and English national teams.

The defending Challenge Cup champion Thorns failed to advance from the group stage of the 2022 NWSL Challenge Cup's West Division, finishing second to group winners OL Reign.

The Thorns led the league going into the final game of the season, but managed only a draw in their final game (against NJ/NY Gotham) and fell to second place behind OL Reign, who won the NWSL Shield. Second place was enough to earn a first-round bye in the playoffs. In their first playoff game, a semifinal, they defeated San Diego Wave 2-1 behind goals from Raquel Rodríguez and Crystal Dunn to advance to the championship game. In the final, they defeated the Kansas City Current 2-0 behind goals from Sophia Smith and Addisyn Merrick (own goal) to win the NWSL Championship.

Sophia Smith set the regular-season club record for goals with 14, won the league's Most Valuable Player award, and also won the championship game MVP award.

On December 1, 2022, Merritt Paulson announced that he was selling the team. The next day, Rhian Wilkinson resigned as coach, after reports that she may have become romantically involved with a player.

== 2023 ==
In January 2023, following the release of the joint NWSL and NWSLPA report and subsequent allegations of league policy violations in the club's actions around Paul Riley, the NWSL fined Thorns FC $1 million, retroactively satisfied by a previous $1 million pledge by owner Merritt Paulson toward establishing an NWSL player safety office. Paulson also announced his intent to sell the Thorns.

The same investigation also alleged that Thorns FC head athletic trainer Pierre Soubrier inappropriately distributed medication containing codeine to players during the 2022 semifinals, and that assistant coach Sophie Clough inappropriately kissed a player's neck during the team's championship celebrations. The club terminated both employees' employment following the report's release.

On January 10, 2023, Thorns FC announced the hiring of Mike Norris, an assistant on Wilkinson's Thorns FC staff and former Canadian women's national soccer team assistant and goalkeeper coach, as her replacement.

The May 21 match drew an attendance of 20,402, the team's largest home attendance to a regular-season match since the 2019 season.

The Thorns failed to advance from the group stage of the 2023 NWSL Challenge Cup. They finished 2nd overall in the league, therefore advancing to the semi-final stage of the play-offs where they were beaten 1-0 by NJ/NY Gotham FC in overtime.

== Year-by-year records ==
- As of November 10, 2024

Competition results per season
Season	NWSL regular season								NWSL Playoffs	NWSL Challenge Cup
Season	P	W	L	D	GF	GA	Pts	Position	NWSL Playoffs	NWSL Challenge Cup
2013	22	11	6	5	32	28	38	3rd	Champions	—
2014	24	10	8	6	39	35	36	3rd	Semifinals	—
2015	20	6	9	5	27	29	23	6th	DNQ	—
2016	20	12	3	5	35	19	41	NWSL Shield	Semifinals	—
2017	24	14	5	5	37	20	47	2nd	Champions	—
2018	24	12	6	6	40	28	42	2nd	Runners-up	—
2019	24	11	6	7	40	31	40	3rd	Semifinals	—
2020	4 (Note: Results from NWSL Fall Series; no playoffs were held.)	3	0	1	10	7	10	NWSL Community Shield	n/a	Semifinals
2021	24	13	6	5	33	17	44	NWSL Shield	Semifinals	Champions
2022	22	10	3	9	49	24	39	2nd	Champions	2nd in West Division
2023	22	10	7	5	42	32	35	2nd	Semifinals	DNQ
2024	26	10	12	4	37	35	34	6th	Quarterfinals	DNQ
2025	26	11	8	7	36	29	40	3rd	Semifinals	DNQ
2026	30	14	8	8	50	41	50	6th		DNQ

Legend:
Qualified for playoffs
Competition winner
DNQ: Did not qualify

Top goalscorer per season, regular-season goals only
Season	Player	Nation	Goals
2013	Christine Sinclair	Canada	8
2013	Alex Morgan	United States	8
2014	Jessica McDonald	United States	11
2015	Allie Long	United States	10
2016	Nadia Nadim	Denmark	9
2017	Christine Sinclair	Canada	8
2018	Lindsey Horan	United States	13
2019	Christine Sinclair	Canada	9
2020 (Note: 2020 Fall Series (4 games))	Christine Sinclair	Canada	6
2021	Sophia Smith	United States	7
2022	Sophia Smith	United States	14
2023	Sophia Smith	United States	10
2024	Sophia Smith	United States	12
2025	Olivia Moultrie	United States	8
2026	Sophia Smith	United States	15
