= 2016 Portland Thorns FC season =

Portland Thorns FC
2016 season
- President: Merritt Paulson
- Head coach: Mark Parsons
- Stadium: Providence Park; Portland, Oregon (Capacity: 21,144)
- National Women's Soccer League: 1st
- NWSL Playoffs: Semifinals (eliminated by Western New York Flash)
- Top goalscorer: Nadia Nadim (9 goals)
- Highest home attendance: 21,144 (Sept. 11 vs. Western New York)
- Lowest home attendance: 13,752 (Sept. 7 vs. Houston)
- Average home league attendance: 16,945
- Biggest win: 5-1 (Sept. 4 vs. Boston Breakers)
- Biggest defeat: 0-3 (July 16 vs. Houston Dash)
Home colors	Away colors
- All statistics correct as of 9/26/2016.

The 2016 season was the Portland Thorns FC's fourth season of existence in the National Women's Soccer League (NWSL), the top division of women's soccer in the United States. The Thorns finished first, winning the NWSL Shield, an improvement over their sixth-place finish in the 2015 season. They lost their opening game of the 2016 NWSL Championship tournament (playoffs).

== Season review ==
=== April ===
The Thorns began their season at Providence Park as they faced off against expansion team Orlando Pride in the latter's inaugural match. Former Thorn Steph Catley was able to strike first for Orlando in the 12th minute. Portland would soon respond with goals from Dagný Brynjarsdóttir in the 25th minute and Linsey Horan in the 81st minute. Both goals would be assisted by captain Tobin Heath. Thorns FC would win their home opener 2–1.

For their last match in April, the Thorns traveled to Kansas City where they would receive a 1–1 draw. Shea Groom was able to strike first with a goal in the 30th minute; however, Lindsey Horan was able to level for the Thorns in the 78th minute, again assisted by Tobin Heath.

Position at the end of April

Pos	Team	Pld	W	D	L	GF	GA	GD	Pts	Qualification
2	Portland Thorns FC	2	1	1	0	3	2	+1	4	NWSL Playoffs

=== May ===
The Thorns began their month of May continuing their 4-game road spell against the Boston Breakers where Dagný Brynjarsdóttir scored the lone goal and Tobin Heath continued her assist streak to 4 in a row. The Thorns would end up winning 1–0.

The Thorns traveled to D.C. to take on the Washington Spirit. The team would end up drawing 0–0 with Tobin Heath acquiring two yellow cards, thus suspending her for the next match against local rivals Seattle Reign FC.

The Thorns finished their 4 away matches in Seattle as they faced off against Reign FC. Nadia Nadim would score her first of the season with an assist by Meg Morris; however, Seattle would respond within 3 minutes by a goal from Beverly Yanez, equalizing at 1-1. Both teams would settle for the draw.

In the first of a two-game home stand, the Thorns secured a 3–1 win over the then-first-place Washington Spirit. In their last game of the month, missing 6 starters due to USWNT call-ups, the Thorns played Seattle to a 0–0 draw.

Position at the end of May

Pos	Team	Pld	W	D	L	GF	GA	GD	Pts	Qualification
2	Portland Thorns FC	7	3	4	0	9	4	+5	13	NWSL Playoffs

=== June ===
The Thorns began June with a two-game road trip, first holding on for a 1–1 draw with Chicago Red Stars and then prevailing 2–0 over Western New York Flash. French international Amandine Henry made her first appearance as a Thorn as a second-half substitute in that game.

The Thorns played a crucial match against Chicago Red Stars to determine who would remain in first place. The Thorns prevailed with a 2–0 win with goals from Christine Sinclair and Nadia Nadim with an assist from Henry, who also started for the first time for the club.

Continuing their unbeaten streak (11 games without a loss from the beginning of the season to the end of June), the Thorns traveled to Florida to take on Orlando Pride. The Thorns would win it 2–1, with goals from Dagný Brynjarsdóttir and Lindsey Horan.

Position at the end of June

Pos	Team	Pld	W	D	L	GF	GA	GD	Pts	Qualification
1	Portland Thorns FC	11	6	5	0	16	6	+10	23	NWSL Shield

=== July ===
The Thorns opened July play without 6 starters due to USWNT and CanWNT Olympics preparations for a home game against Sky Blue. Amandine Henry would join the French national team after the game. The starting lineup included players who previously had seen limited professional minutes or even earning her first start. Sky Blue scored first and the Thorns came back to win 2–1 with goals from Dagný and Nadim to extend their season-opening unbeaten streak to 12 games.

For their second match for the month, the Thorns took on FC Kansas City at home. Now without 7 starting players and using their new amateur players (via a rule that allowed a team to bring in non-paid players when national players go on duty), the Thorns would suffer their first loss of the season, falling 2–1 with the only Thorns goal scorer being Kat Williamson, who was assisted by Dagný Brynjarsdóttir.

The Thorns then went on the road and continuing the stretch without their Olympians, this time also without Dagný as well, lost 3–0 to the 9th-place Houston Dash.

In their last game of both July and before the league-wide Olympics break, the Thorns hosted Seattle Reign at Providence Park. Playing their first 5-4-1 formation of the season, Mana Shim passed to Nadia Nadim who headed home the game's only goal and the Thorns remained in 1st place.

Position at the end of July

Pos	Team	Pld	W	D	L	GF	GA	GD	Pts	Qualification
1	Portland Thorns FC	15	8	5	2	20	12	+8	29	NWSL Shield

=== August ===
Due to the Olympic Games in Brazil, NWSL did not schedule games most of the month. The Thorns traveled to Seattle at the end of the month and fell 3–1 to the Reign.

Position at the end of August

Pos	Team	Pld	W	D	L	GF	GA	GD	Pts	Qualification
2	Portland Thorns FC	16	8	5	3	21	15	+6	29	NWSL Playoffs

=== September ===
The Thorns started off their final month in NWSL League play on a busy week with 3 matches in 7 days. The team, fully reunited after the Olympics, hosted Boston Breakers where the Thorns took a dominating 5–1 victory, keeping them in the race for the NWSL Shield.

Continuing their busy week, Portland Thorns took on Houston Dash. In the 19th minute, Portland fans and team members learned from a message on the big screen that they had clinched a playoff berth with Seattle Reign's loss to Washington Spirit. The Thorns started off strong with a brace from Allie Long in the 26th and 71st minute, both goals assisted by Tobin Heath. Christine Sinclair would finish up by scoring in the 90th minute and shutting out Houston 3–0, giving goalkeeper Michelle Betos 4 clean sheets for the season so far.

To conclude the stretch of 3 games in 8 days, the Thorns played the Western New York Flash in front of their only sold-out crowd of the year, with 21,144 announced attendance. The Thorns went ahead 3-0 only to concede 2 goals within 4 minutes late in the game, but hung on to win and clinch a home playoff match.

On Sunday September 25, the Thorns clinched the NWSL Shield with a win over Sky Blue FC and a Washington Spirit loss to the Chicago Red Stars. The Thorns hosted Western New York Flash in the semi-finals for the NWSL Playoffs, losing a physical match 4–3 in overtime.

Position at the end of the season

Pos	Team	Pld	W	D	L	GF	GA	GD	Pts	Qualification
1	Portland Thorns FC	20	12	5	3	35	19	+16	41	NWSL Shield

== Competitions ==
Competition	Record								Started round	First match	Last match	Final position
Competition	G	W	D	L	GF	GA	GD	Win %				
NWSL	20	12	5	3	35	19	+16	60.00	1	April 17, 2016	September 25, 2016	1st
NWSL Playoffs	1	0	0	1	3	4	−1	0.00	Semi-finals	October 2, 2016	October 2, 2016	out
Total	21	12	5	4	38	23	+15	57.14				

=== NWSL ===
==== Preseason ====
Providence Park Pre-season Tournament

Win Draw Loss Upcoming fixture

March 27, 2016 Pre 1	Portland Thorns FC	0–2	Seattle Reign FC	Portland, Oregon, U.S.
14:30 (PST)	Horan (yellow card) 59'; Nadim (yellow card) 90'	Report	Mathias (yellow card) 59'; Solaun 75'; Fishlock 77'	Stadium: Providence Park

March 30, 2016 Pre 2	Portland Thorns FC	3–0	Oregon State University	Portland, Oregon, U.S.
17:00 (PST)	Nadim 33', 58', 68'; Bourille (yellow card) 71'	Report		Stadium: Providence Park

April 2, 2016 Pre 3	Portland Thorns FC	1–2	Houston Dash	Portland, Oregon, U.S.
14:30 (PST)	Franch (yellow card) 27'; Berryhill (yellow card) 51'; Brynjarsdottir 79'	Report	Beckie 83'; Brooks (yellow card) 86'; Ohai 90'	Stadium: Providence Park

Pos	Team	Pld	W	D	L	GF	GA	GD	Pts
1	(United States) Seattle Reign	3	3	0	0	6	0	+6	9
2	(United States) Houston Dash	3	2	0	1	5	3	+2	6
2	(United States) Portland Thorns FC	3	1	0	2	4	4	0	3
4	(United States) Oregon State University	3	0	0	3	1	8	−7	0

==== Regular season ====
Win Draw Loss Upcoming fixture

April 17, 2016 1	Portland Thorns FC	2–1	Orlando Pride	Portland, Oregon
19:00 (PST)	Brynjarsdóttir 25' (Heath) (yellow card) 45'; Horan 81' (Heath); Klingenberg (yellow card) 87'	Report	Catley 12'; Alleway (yellow card) 78'; Kyle (yellow card) 89'	Stadium: Providence Park; Attendance: 16,073; Referee: Ekaterina Koroleva

April 23, 2016 2	FC Kansas City	1–1	Portland Thorns FC	Kansas City, Missouri
17:30 (PST)	Groom 30' (O'Reilly) (yellow card) 41' (yellow-red card) 47'	Report	Horan 78' (Heath)	Stadium: Swope Soccer Village; Attendance: 3,022; Referee: Danielle Chesky

May 1, 2016 3	Boston Breakers	0–1	Portland Thorns FC	Boston, Massachusetts
14:00 (PST)	Schillgard (yellow card) 38'; King (yellow card) 78'; Ratcliffe (yellow card) 90'	Report	Brynjarsdóttir 79' (Heath); Horan (yellow card) 91+'	Stadium: Jordan Field; Attendance: 3,698; Referee: Brandon Artis

May 7, 2016 4	Washington Spirit	0–0	Portland Thorns FC	Boyds, Maryland
16:00 (PST)	Oyster (yellow card) 17'	Report	Sonnett (yellow card) 26'; Heath (yellow card) 59' (yellow-red card) 88'; Horan (yellow card) 90+5'	Stadium: Maryland SoccerPlex; Attendance: 4,333; Referee: Chris Spivey

May 14, 2016 5	Seattle Reign FC	1–1	Portland Thorns FC	Seattle, Washington
19:00 (PST)	Yanez 49' (Barnes)	Report	Nadim 46' (Morris); Horan (yellow card) 86'; Morris (yellow card) 90'	Stadium: Memorial Stadium; Attendance: 4,631; Referee: Matthew Kreitzer

May 21, 2016 6	Portland Thorns FC	4–1	Washington Spirit	Portland, Oregon
19:00 (PST)	Horan 27' (Heath) (yellow card) 76'; Kleiner 31' (o.g.); Heath 45' (Sinclair); Morris 78', (yellow card) 60'; Sonnett (yellow card) 32'; Nadim (yellow card) 61'	Report	Lohman 55' (Dunn); Nairn (yellow card) 61'	Stadium: Providence Park; Attendance: 15,823; Referee: Ekaterina Koroleva

May 29, 2016 7	Portland Thorns FC	0–0	Seattle Reign FC	Portland, Oregon
16:00 (PST)		Report	Reed (yellow card) 84'	Stadium: Providence Park; Attendance: 18,114; Referee: Greg Dopka

June 12, 2016 8	Chicago Red Stars	1–1	Portland Thorns FC	Bridgeview, Illinois
15:00 (PST)	Christen Press 61' (Alyssa Mautz); Sofia Huerta (yellow card) 74'; Alyssa Mautz (yellow card) 75'; Arin Gilliland (yellow card) 84'	Report	Christine Sinclair 24'; Nadia Nadim (yellow card) 88'	Stadium: Toyota Park; Attendance: 3,131; Referee: Levi Rippy

June 17, 2016 9	Western New York Flash	0–2	Portland Thorns FC	Rochester, New York
16:00 (PST)	Mewis (yellow card) 47'; Kennedy (yellow card) 55'; Doniak (yellow card) 90'	Report	Sinclair 46' (Long); Nadim 73' (pen.); Raso (yellow card) 81'	Stadium: Sahlen's Stadium; Attendance: 2,235; Referee: Victor Rivas

June 22, 2016 10	Portland Thorns FC	2–0	Chicago Red Stars	Portland, Oregon
19:00 (PST)	Sinclair 6'; Nadim 25' (Henry)	Report		Stadium: Providence Park; Attendance: 16,931; Referee: Chipalo Street

June 26, 2016 11	Orlando Pride	1–2	Portland Thorns FC	Orlando, Florida
14:00 (PST)	Alleway (yellow card) 43'; Spencer 67'	Report	Brynjarsdóttir 80' (Sinclair); Horan 90' (Raso); Raso (yellow card) 90+2'	Stadium: Camping World Stadium; Attendance: 7,143; Referee: Ekaterina Koroleva

July 2, 2016 12	Portland Thorns FC	2–1	Sky Blue FC	Portland, Oregon
19:30 (PST)	Brynjarsdóttir 38' (Nadim); Nadim 62' (pen.); Weber (yellow card) 66'	Report	Kai 30' (Lytle); Rampone (yellow card) 45+2'	Stadium: Providence Park; Attendance: 14,287; Referee: Reyna Fonseca

July 9, 2016 13	Portland Thorns FC	1–2	FC Kansas City	Portland, Oregon
19:30 (PST)	Williamson 76' (Brynjarsdóttir); Nadim (yellow card) 62'	Report	Groom 23' (McCarty), 54' (McCarty); Reed (yellow card) 51'; Averbuch (yellow card) 90+3'	Stadium: Providence Park; Attendance: 16,942; Referee: Farhad Dadkho

July 16, 2016 14	Houston Dash	3–0	Portland Thorns FC	Houston, Texas
5:30 p.m. (PST)	Daly 7' (Ohai); Brooks 68' (Moros); Ohai 83'	Report	Shim (yellow card) 40'; Raso (yellow card) 81'	Stadium: BBVA Compass Stadium; Attendance: 5,561; Referee: Danielle Chesky

July 30, 2016 15	Portland Thorns FC	1–0	Seattle Reign FC	Portland, Oregon
19:30 (PST)	Nadim 74' (Shim)	Report	Fishlock (yellow card) 61'	Stadium: Providence Park; Attendance: 19,231; Referee: Malik Badawi

August 27, 2016 16	Seattle Reign FC	3–1	Portland Thorns FC	Seattle, Washington
2pm (PST)	Melis 27' (Naho), 50' (Yanez); Barnes (yellow card) 54'; Fishlock (yellow card) 65'; Rapinoe 90+4' (Fishlock)	Report	Reynolds (yellow card) 71'; Long 90+2' (Heath)	Stadium: Memorial Stadium; Attendance: 5,888; Referee: Rosendo Martinez

September 4, 2016 17	Portland Thorns FC	5–1	Boston Breakers	Portland, Oregon
16:00 (PST)	Sinclair 14' (Nadim); Long 48' (Sinclair); Nadim 41' (pen.), 79' (Long), 90+2' (yellow card) 90'	Report	King 84' (Beckmann)	Stadium: Providence Park; Attendance: 17,152; Referee: Jon Freemon

September 7, 2016 18	Portland Thorns FC	3–0	Houston Dash	Portland, Oregon
19:00 (PST)	Long 26' (Heath), 71' (Heath); Sinclair 90'	Report		Stadium: Providence Park; Attendance: 13,752; Referee: Brandon Artis

September 11, 2016 19	Portland Thorns FC	3–2	Western New York Flash	Portland, Oregon
18:30 (PST)	Nadim 27' (pen.); Sinclair 37'; Heath (yellow card) 58'; Brynjarsdóttir 69' (Heath); Betos (yellow card) 71'	Report	Hinkle (yellow card) 27'; McDonald 77' (Eddy); Williams 80' (McDonald)	Stadium: Providence Park; Attendance: 21,144; Referee: Marco Vega

September 25, 2016 20	Sky Blue FC	1–3	Portland Thorns FC	Piscataway, New Jersey
16:00 (PST)	Kai 6' (O'Hara); Grubka (yellow card) 59'	Report	Long 41' (Heath), 84' (Raso); Horan 57' (Nadim)	Stadium: Yurcak Field; Attendance: 3,780; Referee: Christina Unkel

The 2016 NWSL Regular Season schedule was released on February 18, 2016.

===== Results by round =====
Round	1	2	3	4	5	6	7	8	9	10	11	12	13	14	15	16	17	18	19	20
Stadium	H	A	A	A	A	H	H	A	A	H	A	H	H	A	H	A	H	H	H	A
Result	W	D	W	D	D	W	D	D	W	W	W	W	L	L	W	L	W	W	W	W
Position (Note: POR's position at the end of the matchweek, not their match.)	3	2	2	3	3	3	3	3	2	1	1	1	1	1	2	2	2	2	2	1

Updated to match(es) played on September 25, 2016. Source: Match results
A = Away; H = Home; W = Win; D = Draw; L = Loss

===== Home/away results =====
Overall								Home						Away					
Pld	W	D	L	GF	GA	GD	Pts	W	D	L	GF	GA	GD	W	D	L	GF	GA	GD
20	12	5	3	35	19	+16	41	8	1	1	23	8	+15	4	4	2	12	11	+1

Last updated: September 25, 2016.
Source: Match reports

===== League table =====
Pos	Team	Pld	W	D	L	GF	GA	GD	Pts	Qualification
1	Portland Thorns FC	20	12	5	3	35	19	+16	41	NWSL Shield
2	Washington Spirit	20	12	3	5	30	21	+9	39	NWSL Playoffs
3	Chicago Red Stars	20	9	6	5	24	20	+4	33	NWSL Playoffs
4	Western New York Flash (C)	20	9	5	6	40	26	+14	32	NWSL Playoffs
5	Seattle Reign FC	20	8	6	6	29	21	+8	30	
6	FC Kansas City	20	7	5	8	18	20	−2	26	
7	Sky Blue FC	20	7	5	8	24	30	−6	26	
8	Houston Dash	20	6	4	10	29	29	0	22	
9	Orlando Pride	20	6	1	13	20	30	−10	19	
10	Boston Breakers	20	3	2	15	14	47	−33	11	

Source: NWSL
Rules for classification: Tiebreakers
(C) Champions

=== NWSL Playoffs ===
Win Draw Loss Upcoming fixture

October 2, 2016 Semi-finals	Portland Thorns FC	3–4 (a.e.t.)	Western New York Flash	Portland, Oregon
14:00 (PST)	Sinclair 39' (Reynolds); Brynjarsdottir (yellow card) 75'; Sonnett 78'; Horan 106+' (Brynjarsdottir); Heath (yellow card) 114'	Report	Mewis 16'; Kennedy (yellow card) 28'; Doniak 38' (McDonald); Dahlkemper (yellow card) 76'; Williams 98'; Williams 104' (Mewis); Eddy (yellow card) 109'; D'Angelo (yellow card) 121+'	Stadium: Providence Park; Attendance: 20,086; Referee: Marco Vega

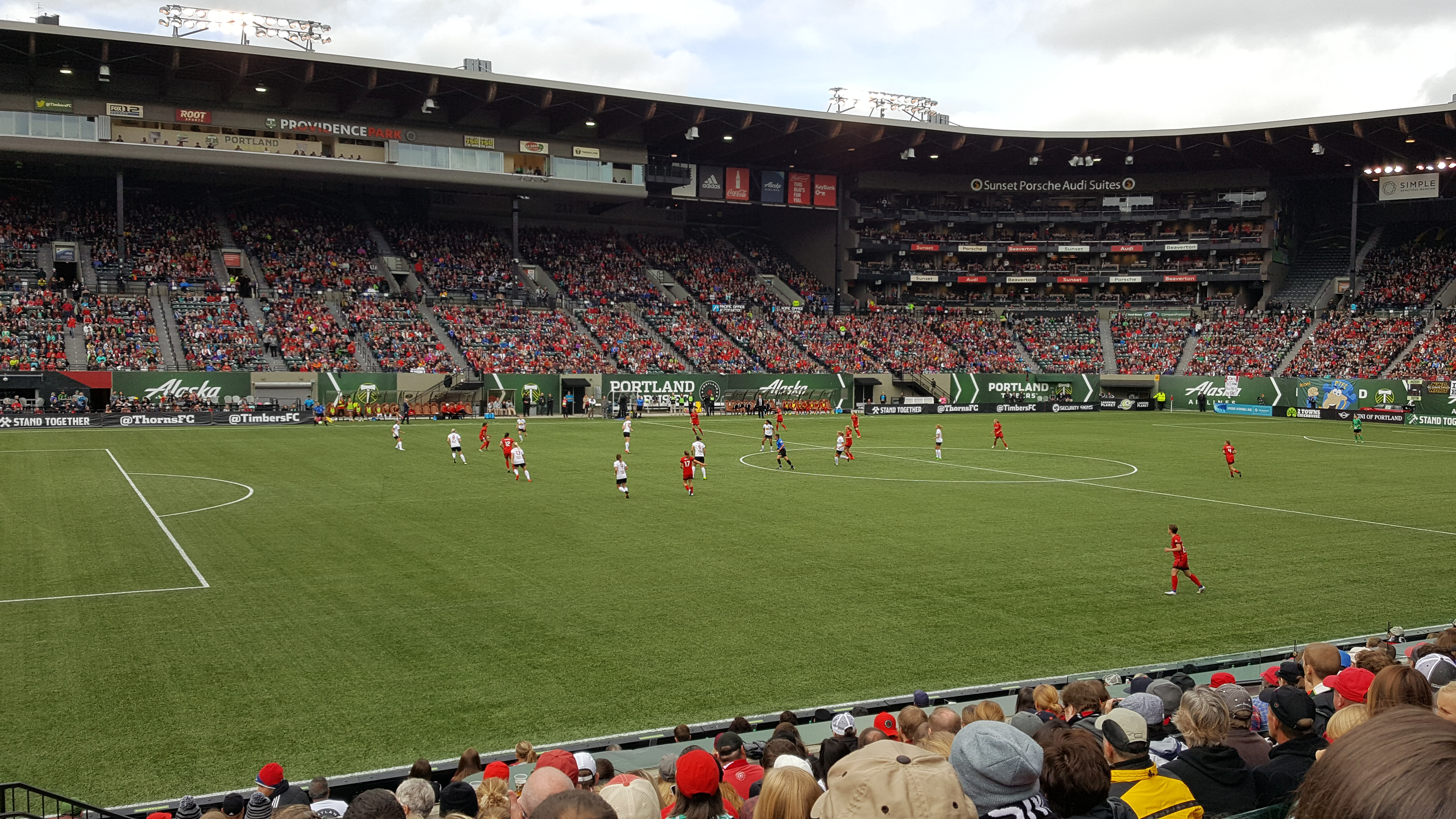
Thorns playing Flash, October 2, 2016

== Club ==
=== Executive staff ===
Majority Owner & Chief Executive Officer	Merritt Paulson
President of Business	Mike Golub
General Manager / President of Soccer	Gavin Wilkinson
Manager of Soccer Operations / Executive Assistant	Sarah Aschwald

Updated to match played November 16, 2016

=== Coaching staff ===
Position	Staff
Head Coach	Mark Parsons
Assistant Coach	Tracy Hasson
Assistant Coach	Sophie Clough
Assistant Coach	Carly Copplestone
Goalkeeping Coach	Nadine Angerer
Fitness Coach	Garga Caserta
Head Athletic Trainer	Robyn Hasegawa
Athletic Trainer	Katie Donnelley
Equipment Manager	Megan Lovich

Last updated: November 16, 2016

=== Stadiums ===
Ground (capacity and dimensions)	Providence Park (21,144 / 110x75 yards)
Training Ground	Providence Park

Source: Providence Park

== Kits ==
=== Primary kit ===
The 2016 primary kits are their signature red color with a "spray on" black on the ends of the sleeves. The kits remain Nike and the sponsorship with their sponsor Providence Health and Services on the front.

=== Secondary kit ===
The 2016 secondary kits feature the same style as the first kit, however instead of red, it is white with the "spray on" black sleeve style. The kit is also Nike and shows the Providence Health and Services sponsorship.

=== Third kit ===
The Thorns do not have a third kit for 2016.

== First Team ==
=== Roster ===
All players contracted to the club during the season included.
Last updated: August 30, 2016

No.	Name	Nationality	Positions	Date of birth (age)	Year with Club (Year Signed)
Goalkeepers
18	Michelle Betos	(United States)	GK	February 20, 1988 (age 38)	3 (2014)
24	Adrianna Franch	(United States)	GK	November 12, 1990 (age 35)	1 (2016)
Defenders
2	Katherine Reynolds	(United States)	RB	September 14, 1987 (age 38)	1 (2016)
4	Emily Menges	(United States)	CB	July 28, 1992 (age 33)	3 (2014)
16	Emily Sonnett	(United States)	CB	November 25, 1993 (age 32)	1 (2016)
25	Meghan Klingenberg	(United States)	LB	August 2, 1988 (age 37)	1 (2016)
44	Meg Morris	(United States)	LB / FW	May 11, 1992 (age 33)	1 (2016)
Midfielders
6	Meleana Shim	(United States)	CM	September 25, 1991 (age 34)	4 (2013)
7	Lindsey Horan (NTA)	(United States)	CM	May 26, 1994 (age 31)	1 (2016)
10	Allie Long	(United States)	LW / CM	August 13, 1987 (age 38)	4 (2013)
11	Dagný Brynjarsdóttir	(Iceland)	MF	August 10, 1991 (age 34)	1 (2016)
15	Kendall Johnson	(United States)	MF / DF	April 24, 1991 (age 34)	2 (2015)
17	Tobin Heath (NTA)	(United States)	LW	May 29, 1988 (age 37)	4 (2013)
28	Amandine Henry	(France)	CM	September 28, 1989 (age 36)	1 (2016)
30	Celeste Boureille	(United States)	MF	April 20, 1994 (age 31)	1 (2016)
Forwards
9	Nadia Nadim	(Denmark)	CF / RW	January 2, 1988 (age 38)	1 (2016)
12	Christine Sinclair	(Canada)	CF	June 12, 1983 (age 42)	4 (2013)
21	Hayley Raso	(Australia)	FW / RW	September 5, 1994 (age 31)	1 (2016)
26	Mallory Weber	(United States)	FW / CB	April 4, 1994 (age 31)	1 (2016)

- (HG) = Homegrown Player
- (NTA) = National Team Allocated Player
- (Loan) = On Loan
- (AP) = Amateur Player

== Squad statistics ==
Source: NWSL

Squad statistics are of regular season only

N	Pos	Player	GP	GS	Min	G	A	PK	Shot	SOG	SOG%	Cro	CK	Off	Foul	FS	YC	RC
20	DF	McKenzie Berryhill	5	2	182	0	0	0	1	0	0%	0	0	0	1	1	0	0
18	GK	Michelle Betos	14	14	1260	0	0	0	0	0	—	0	0	0	0	2	1	0
30	MF	Celeste Boureille	6	5	466	0	0	0	5	0	0%	0	0	0	4	3	0	0
11	MF	Dagny Brynjarsdottir	17	12	1068	5	1	0	13	8	62%	0	0	1	25	5	1	0
27	MF	Maureen Fitzgerald	3	2	133	0	0	0	0	0	—	0	0	0	3	2	0	0
24	GK	Adrianna Franch	6	6	540	0	0	0	0	0	—	0	0	0	0	0	0	0
17	MF	Tobin Heath	14	13	1158	1	10	0	33	18	55%	6	61	6	25	30	2	1
28	MF	Amandine Henry	9	8	638	0	1	0	10	2	20%	0	0	1	13	7	0	0
7	MF	Lindsey Horan	15	15	1303	5	0	0	29	17	59%	2	0	8	23	17	4	0
25	DF	Meghan Klingenberg	14	14	1259	0	0	0	4	2	50%	4	0	3	6	7	1	0
32	DF	Sam Lofton	3	0	55	0	0	0	1	1	100%	0	0	0	1	1	0	0
10	MF	Allie Long	15	15	1350	6	2	0	29	14	48%	2	3	3	19	27	0	0
4	DF	Emily Menges	20	20	1800	0	0	0	0	0	—	0	0	0	3	4	0	0
44	DF	Meg Morris	7	3	274	1	1	0	2	1	50%	0	0	4	4	3	2	0
9	FW	Nadia Nadim	20	20	1649	9	3	4	40	17	43%	2	15	18	32	21	4	0
29	DF	Shade Pratt	5	1	141	0	0	0	1	1	100%	0	0	0	4	2	0	0
21	FW	Hayley Raso	20	6	757	0	2	0	15	4	27%	1	0	5	18	18	3	0
2	DF	Katherine Reynolds	20	18	1672	0	0	0	2	2	100%	0	0	0	11	9	1	0
6	MF	Mana Shim	14	9	814	0	1	0	7	2	29%	1	3	1	9	3	1	0
12	FW	Christine Sinclair	11	10	826	6	2	0	21	12	57%	0	0	6	4	4	0	0
22	DF	Jennifer Skogerboe	3	2	210	0	0	0	0	0	—	0	0	0	1	3	0	0
16	DF	Emily Sonnett	15	15	1350	0	0	0	2	1	50%	0	0	1	4	3	2	0
26	DF	Mallory Weber	13	7	697	0	0	0	4	1	25%	0	0	0	9	6	1	0
5	DF	Kat Williamson	5	3	196	1	0	0	1	1	100%	0	0	0	3	1	0	0
Team Total			20	—	19798	34	23	4	220	104	47%	18	82	57	222	179	23	1

N	Pos	Goal keeper	GP	GS	Min	GA	GA/G	PKA	PKF	Shot	SOG	Sav	Sav%	YC	RC
18	GK	Michelle Betos	14	14	1260	16	1.14	0	1	165	66	50	76%	1	0
24	GK	Adrianna Franch	6	6	540	3	0.50	0	0	62	22	19	86%	0	0
Team Total			20	—	1800	19	0.95	0	1	227	88	69	78%	1	0

== Player transactions ==
=== National Team Player Allocation ===
Date	Player	Positions Played	Previous club	Notes	Ref
January 13, 2016	(United States) Lindsey Horan	FW	(France) Paris Saint-Germain	U.S. Women's National Team allocation process	

=== Transfers in ===
Date	Player	Positions Played	Previous club	Fee/notes	Ref
November 2, 2015	(United States) Meghan Klingenberg	DF	(United States) Orlando Pride	Part of trade for Alex Morgan and Kaylyn Kyle.	
December 10, 2015	(United States) Adrianna Franch	GK	(United States) Orlando Pride	Part of trade for Steph Catley.	
January 19, 2016	(Denmark) Nadia Nadim	FW	(United States) Sky Blue FC	Traded for the second overall pick in 2016 and a 2017 first and conditional fourth-round pick.	
February 2, 2016	(United States) Katherine Reynolds	DF	(United States) Washington Spirit	Traded for Alyssa Kleiner.	
March 16, 2016	(France) Amandine Henry	MF	(France) Olympique Lyonnais		
April 15, 2016	(United States) Celeste Boureille	MF			
April 16, 2016	(Australia) Hayley Raso	FW	(United States) Washington Spirit	Signed off waivers.	
April 27, 2016	(United States) Meg Morris	DF / FW	(United States) Sky Blue FC		
July 1, 2016	(United States) Jennifer Skogerboe	DF	(Czech Republic) FC Slovácko		

=== Loans in ===
Date	Player	Positions Played	Previous club	Fee/notes	Ref

=== Loans out ===
Date	Player	Positions Played	Destination club	Fee/notes	Ref
September 24, 2015	(United States) Michelle Betos	GK	(Australia) Sydney FC	Will return for the start of the 2016 season.	
October 6, 2015	(Australia) Steph Catley	DF	(Australia) Melbourne City FC	Was set to return for the start of the 2016 season. Traded.	
October 6, 2015	(United States) Kendall Johnson	DF	(Australia) Western Sydney Wanderers	Will return for the start of the 2016 season.	
October 6, 2015	(Australia) Clare Polkinghorne	DF	(Australia) Brisbane Roar	Will return for the start of the 2016 season.	
October 6, 2015	(England) Lianne Sanderson	MF	(Cyprus) Apollon Limassol	Was set to return for the start of the 2016 season. Selected in Expansion Draft.	
October 6, 2015	(United States) Mana Shim	MF	(Japan) Iga Football Club Kunoichi	Will return for the start of the 2016 season.	

=== Transfers out ===
Date	Player	Positions Played	Destination club	Fee/notes	Ref
October 21, 2015	(Equatorial Guinea) Genoveva Añonma	FW	N/A	Waived.	
October 26, 2015	(United States) Alex Morgan	FW	(United States) Orlando Pride	Part of trade for first Expansion Draft selection, first round College Draft selection, and international roster spot.	
October 26, 2015	(Canada) Kaylyn Kyle	MF	(United States) Orlando Pride	Part of trade for first Expansion Draft selection, first round College Draft selection, and international roster spot.	
November 2, 2015	(England) Lianne Sanderson	MF	(United States) Orlando Pride	Selected in Expansion Draft.	
December 10, 2015	(Australia) Steph Catley	DF	(United States) Orlando Pride	Part of trade for Adrianna Franch.	
February 2, 2016	(United States) Alyssa Kleiner	DF	(United States) Washington Spirit	Traded for Katherine Reynolds.	
February 8, 2016	(Canada) Rhian Wilkinson	DF	N/A	No longer allocated. Released.	
March 24, 2016	(England) Jodie Taylor	FW	(England) Arsenal Ladies		
August 30, 2016	(United States) McKenzie Berryhill	DF	(United States) Orlando Pride	Waived. Claimed off waivers by Pride.	

=== Contract extensions ===
Date	Player	Positions Played	Year with Club (Year Signed)	Notes	Ref

=== National Women's Soccer League College Draft ===
Stage (Round Pick)	Player	Positions Played	Previous club	Notes	Ref
1 (1)	Emily Sonnett	DF	(United States) Virginia Cavaliers		
3 (21)	McKenzie Berryhill	DF	(United States) Arizona State Sun Devils		

The draft was held on January 15, 2016.

=== Staff in ===
Date	Name	Position	Previous club	Notes	Ref

=== Staff out ===
Date	Name	Position	Destination club	Notes	Ref

=== National team participation ===
Ten Thorns players have been called up to play for their national teams during this season.

Team	Players
United States	Meghan Klingenberg, Tobin Heath, Emily Sonnett, Lindsey Horan, Allie Long
Canada	Christine Sinclair
Iceland	Dagný Brynjarsdóttir
Denmark	Nadia Nadim
France	Amandine Henry

== Statistics ==
=== Appearances ===
No.	Pos.	Name	NWSL				NWSL Playoffs				Total			
No.	Pos.	Name	Apps	Goals	Yellow card	Red card	Apps	Goals	Yellow card	Red card	Apps	Goals	Yellow card	Red card
2	DF	(United States) Katherine Reynolds	17 (2)	0	1	0	0	0	0	0	17 (2)	0	1	0
4	DF	(United States) Emily Menges	19	0	1	0	0	0	0	0	19	0	1	0
5	DF	(United States) Kat Williamson	4 (1)	1	0	0	0	0	0	0	4 (1)	1	0	0
6	MF	(United States) Meleana Shim	9 (5)	0	1	0	0	0	0	0	9 (5)	0	1	0
7	MF	(United States) Lindsey Horan	14	4	4	0	0	0	0	0	14	4	4	0
9	FW	(Denmark) Nadia Nadim	19	9	4	0	0	0	0	0	19	9	4	0
10	MF	(United States) Allie Long	14	4	0	0	0	0	0	0	14	4	0	0
11	MF	(Iceland) Dagný Brynjarsdóttir	12 (4)	5	1	0	0	0	0	0	12 (4)	5	1	0
12	FW	(Canada) Christine Sinclair	9 (1)	6	0	0	0	0	0	0	9 (1)	6	0	0
15	MF	(United States) Kendall Johnson	0	0	0	0	0	0	0	0	0	0	0	0
16	DF	(United States) Emily Sonnett	14	0	2	0	0	0	0	0	14	0	2	0
17	MF	(United States) Tobin Heath	12 (1)	1	2	1	0	0	0	0	12 (1)	1	2	1
18	GK	(United States) Michelle Betos	13	0	1	0	0	0	0	0	13	0	1	0
21	FW	(Australia) Hayley Raso	6 (13)	0	3	0	0	0	0	0	6 (13)	0	3	0
22	DF	(United States) Jennifer Skogerboe	2 (1)	0	0	0	0	0	0	0	2 (1)	0	0	0
24	GK	(United States) Adrianna Franch	6	0	0	0	0	0	0	0	6	0	0	0
25	DF	(United States) Meghan Klingenberg	13	0	1	0	0	0	0	0	13	0	1	0
26	FW	(United States) Mallory Weber	7 (6)	0	1	0	0	0	0	0	7 (6)	0	1	0
27	MF	(United States) Maureen Fitzgerald	2 (1)	0	0	0	0	0	0	0	2 (1)	0	0	0
28	MF	(France) Amandine Henry	7 (1)	0	0	0	0	0	0	0	7 (1)	0	0	0
29	FW	(United States) Shade Pratt	1 (4)	0	0	0	0	0	0	0	1 (4)	0	0	0
30	MF	(United States) Celeste Boureille	5 (1)	0	0	0	0	0	0	0	5 (1)	0	0	0
32	DF	(United States) Samantha Lofton	0 (3)	0	0	0	0	0	0	0	0 (3)	0	0	0
44	MF	(United States) Meg Morris	3 (4)	1	2	0	0	0	0	0	3 (4)	1	2	0
Players who were transferred/waived from the club during active season or on loan
20	DF	(United States) McKenzie Berryhill	2 (3)	0	0	0	0	0	0	0	2 (3)	0	0	0

Last updated: September 11, 2016.
Source: NWSL statistics

=== Goalkeeper stats ===
No.	Player	NWSL				NWSL Playoffs				Total			
No.	Player	MIN	GA	GAA	SV	MIN	GA	GAA	SV	MIN	GA	GAA	SV
18	(United States) Michelle Betos	1170	15	1.15	48	0	0	0.00	0	1170	15	1.15	48
24	(United States) Adrianna Franch	540	3	0.50	19	0	0	0.00	0	540	3	0.50	19
	TOTALS	1620	16	0.89	65	0	0	0.00	0	1710	18	0.95	67

Last updated: September 11, 2016.
Source: NWSL statistics

=== Line-up ===
As of September 11, 2016.

Visual

Formation: 4-2-3-1

Most recent starters

No.	Pos.	Nat.	Name	MS	Notes
18	GK	(United States)	Michelle Betos	13	
11	RB	(United States)	Katherine Reynolds	17	
16	CB	(United States)	Emily Sonnett	14	
4	CB	(United States)	Emily Menges	19	
25	LB	(United States)	Meghan Klingenberg	13	
10	DM	(United States)	Allie Long	14	
28	DM	(France)	Amandine Henry	7	
9	RW	(Denmark)	Nadia Nadim	19	
7	CM	(United States)	Lindsey Horan	14	
17	LW	(United States)	Tobin Heath	12	
12	CF	(Canada)	Christine Sinclair (c)	9	

Players who have started

No.	Pos.	Nat.	Name	MS	Notes
24	GK	(United States)	Adrianna Franch	6	
5	LB	(United States)	Kat Williamson	3	
44	RB	(United States)	Meg Morris	3	
22	RB	(United States)	Jennifer Skogerboe	2	
	LB	(United States)	McKenzie Berryhill	2	
6	DM	(United States)	Meleana Shim	9	
11	AM	(Iceland)	Dagný Brynjarsdóttir	12	
30	CM	(United States)	Celeste Boureille	5	
29	AM	(United States)	Shade Pratt	1	
26	AM	(United States)	Mallory Weber	7	
27	CM	(United States)	Maureen Fitzgerald	2	
21	RW	(Australia)	Hayley Raso	6	

=== Top scorers ===
The list is sorted by shirt number when total goals are equal.

Rnk	Pos	No.	Player	NWSL	NWSL Playoffs	Total
1	F	9	(Denmark) Nadia Nadim	9	0	9
2	F	12	(Canada) Christine Sinclair	6	0	6
3	MF	11	(Iceland) Dagný Brynjarsdóttir	5	0	5
4	MF	7	(United States) Lindsey Horan	4	0	4
4	MF	10	(United States) Allie Long	4	0	4
6	DF	5	(United States) Kat Williamson	1	0	1
6	MF	17	(United States) Tobin Heath	1	0	1
6	DF	44	(United States) Meg Morris	1	0	1
Own goals				1	0	1
Total				32	0	32

Last updated: September 11, 2016.
Source: NWSL statistics

=== Top assists ===
The list is sorted by shirt number when total assists are equal.

Rnk	Pos	No.	Player	NWSL	NWSL Playoffs	Total
1	MF	17	(United States) Tobin Heath	9	0	9
2	FW	9	(Denmark) Nadia Nadim	2	0	2
2	MF	10	(United States) Allie Long	2	0	2
2	FW	12	(Canada) Christine Sinclair	2	0	2
5	MF	6	(United States) Meleana Shim	1	0	1
5	MF	11	(Iceland) Dagný Brynjarsdóttir	1	0	1
5	FW	21	(Australia) Hayley Raso	1	0	1
5	MF	28	(France) Amandine Henry	1	0	1
5	MF	44	(United States) Meg Morris	1	0	1
TOTALS				20	0	20

Last updated: September 11, 2016.
Source: NWSL statistics

=== Clean sheets ===
The list is sorted by shirt number when total appearances are equal.

Rnk	No.	Player	NWSL	NWSL Playoffs	Total
1	18	(United States) Michelle Betos	4	0	4
1	24	(United States) Adrianna Franch	3	0	3
TOTALS			7	0	7

Last updated: September 7, 2016.
Source: NWSL statistics

=== Summary ===
Games played	20 (20 NWSL)
Games won	12 (12 NWSL)
Games drawn	5 (5 NWSL)
Games lost	3 (3 NWSL)
Goals scored	35 (35 NWSL)
Goals conceded	19 (19 NWSL)
Goal difference	+16 (+16 NWSL)
Clean sheets	7 (7 NWSL)
Yellow cards	23 (23 NWSL)
Red cards	1 (1 NWSL)
Most appearances	20 Appearances (Emily Menges, Nadia Nadim, Katherine Reynolds, Hayley Raso)
Top scorer	(9) (Nadia Nadim)
Top assists	(10) (Tobin Heath)
Top clean sheets	(4) (Michelle Betos)
Winning Percentage	Overall: 12/20 (60.00%)

Last updated: September 25, 2016.
Source: NWSL statistics

== Honors ==
=== NWSL Player of the Month ===
Month	Result	Player	Ref
April	Won	(United States) Tobin Heath	
June	Won	(Canada) Christine Sinclair	
September	Won	(United States) Allie Long	

=== NWSL Weekly Awards ===
==== NWSL Player of the Week ====
Week	Result	Player	Ref
6	Won	(United States) Tobin Heath	
19	Won	(United States) Allie Long	

==== NWSL Goal of the Week ====
Week	Result	Player	Ref
6	Won	(United States) Tobin Heath	
11	Won	(Iceland) Dagný Brynjarsdóttir	

==== NWSL Save of the Week ====
Week	Result	Player	Ref
1	Won	(United States) Michelle Betos	
7	Won	(United States) Katherine Reynolds	
12	Won	(United States) Michelle Betos	
13	Won	(United States) Michelle Betos	
15	Won	(United States) Michelle Betos	

== See also ==
- 2016 National Women's Soccer League season
