= 2015 Portland Thorns FC season =

Portland Thorns FC
2015 season
- President: Merritt Paulson
- Head coach: Paul Riley
- Stadium: Providence Park; Portland, Oregon (Capacity: 21,144)
- National Women's Soccer League: 6th
- NWSL Playoffs: DNQ
- Top goalscorer: League: Allie Long (10 goals); All: Allie Long (12 goals)
- Highest home attendance: 21,144 (July 22nd vs. Seattle Reign) (August 30th vs. Washington Spirit)
- Lowest home attendance: 12,223 (July 3 vs. Sky Blue)
- Average home league attendance: 15,639
Home colors	Away colors

The 2015 season was the Portland Thorns FC's third season of existence in the National Women's Soccer League, the top division of women's soccer in the United States.

After a disappointing end to the 2014 season that saw the team knocked out of the 2014 NWSL Championship Playoffs by eventual league champions FC Kansas City, head coach Paul Riley sought to make changes that would bolster the team's roster to account for the players who would be called up to their respective national teams during the 2015 FIFA Women's World Cup. After stellar performances in 2014, goalkeeper Nadine Angerer and midfielder Verónica Boquete were both named to the ten player shortlist of the 2014 FIFA World Player of the Year and Boquete was named to the NWSL Best XI as well as being named 2014 Supporters' Player of the Year.

The team made a number of signings before the 2015 season including Genoveva Añonma who captains the Equatorial Guinea women's national football team, a 2015 NWSL College Draft day trade of the Thorns' 2014 season leading scorer Jessica McDonald for Jodie Taylor of the England women's national football team and leading scorer of the Washington Spirit, and defender Kat Williamson, former Thorns player who had been traded away during the 2014 season.

Several players were loaned out in the offseason including defender Rachel Van Hollebeke to Iga Football Club Kunoichi of the Japanese Nadeshiko League, and goalkeeper Nadine Angerer and defender Stephanie Catley to the Melbourne Victory of the W-League.

Midfielder Verónica Boquete chose to sign with 1. FFC Frankfurt rather than remain with the Thorns for the 2015 season, and three players retired in the offseason, including defender Nikki Marshall, midfielder Sarah Huffman, and midfielder Angie Kerr.

On April 6, 2015, the Thorns unveiled their 2015 kits that were the first custom designs by Nike in the league.

Due to the national team player callups for the 2015 FIFA Women's World Cup, the league announced that they would be taking a two-week break and shortening the season from 24 to 20 games.

The Thorns finished the 2015 season with 23 points from 20 games and did not reach the playoffs, the first (and as of 2020, the only) season in which they did not reach the playoffs.

== Club ==
=== Coaching staff ===
Position	Staff
Head Coach	Paul Riley
Assistant Coach	Skip Thorp
Goalkeeper Coach	Scott Vallow
Fitness Coach	Garga Caserta
Athletic Trainer	Katie Donnelley
Equipment and Player Relations Manager	Megan Lovich

Last updated: September 5, 2015
Source: Portland Thorns

=== Roster ===
* – denotes amateur call-ups

Note: Flags indicate national team as defined under FIFA eligibility rules; some limited exceptions apply. Players may hold more than one non-FIFA nationality.

No.	Pos.	Nation	Player
1	GK	GER	Nadine Angerer
2	DF	USA	Emily Menges
4	DF	AUS	Stephanie Catley
5	DF	USA	Kat Williamson
6	MF	USA	Meleana Shim
7	MF	USA	Sinead Farrelly
8	FW	EQG	Genoveva Añonma
9	DF	AUS	Clare Polkinghorne
10	MF	USA	Allie Long
11	DF	CAN	Kaylyn Kyle
12	FW	CAN	Christine Sinclair
13	FW	USA	Alex Morgan
14	FW	ENG	Jodie Taylor
15	DF	USA	Kendall Johnson

No.	Pos.	Nation	Player
16	DF	USA	Rachel Van Hollebeke
17	MF	USA	Tobin Heath
18	GK	USA	Michelle Betos
20	FW	USA	Sarah Jackson*
21	DF	CAN	Sarah Robbins
22	DF	CAN	Rhian Wilkinson
25	DF	USA	Courtney Niemiec
26	DF	USA	Taylor Comeau*
28	FW	SWE	Hanna Terry
29	FW	USA	Kelsey Haycook*
30	DF	USA	Alyssa Kleiner*
77	MF	USA	McCall Zerboni

Source: Portland Thorns (archived)

== Match results ==
=== Key ===
Win Tie Loss

=== Pre-season ===
March 21, 2015 1	Portland Pilots	0–4	Portland Thorns FC	Portland, Oregon
19:00 (PDT)		Report	Long 70' (pen.); Haycook 75'; Speck 76'; Johnson 82'	Stadium: Merlo Field; Attendance: 1,582; Referee: Ray Moffatte Jr.

March 25, 2015 1	FC Tucson	0–2	Portland Thorns FC	Tucson, Arizona
18:30 (PDT)	Marquez (yellow card) 22'; Davidson (yellow card) 53'	Report	Taylor 24'; Haycook 88'	Stadium: North Kino Stadium; Attendance: 1,118; Referee: Ramy Touchan

March 28, 2015 1	Arizona Wildcats	0–6	Portland Thorns FC	Tucson, Arizona
18:30 (PDT)		Report	Taylor 25'; Long 29'; Haycook 40'; Comeau 76', 80'; Monogue 89'	Stadium: North Kino Stadium; Referee: Nat Stewart

=== Regular season ===
April 11, 2015 1	Portland Thorns FC	4–1	Boston Breakers	Portland, Oregon
19:00 (PDT)	Farrelly 21'; Shim 38'; Long 71', 72'	Report	Pathman (yellow card) 33'; McCaffrey 63'	Stadium: Providence Park; Attendance: 13,386; Referee: Margaret Domka

Apr 18, 2015 2	Portland Thorns FC	1–0	Western New York Flash	Portland, Oregon
16:00 (PDT)	Long 22'; Wilkinson (yellow card) 74'	Report		Stadium: Providence Park; Attendance: 13,148; Referee: Karen Abt

Apr 25, 2015 3	Chicago Red Stars	2–2	Portland Thorns FC	Lisle, Illinois
17:30 (PDT)	Press 4', 8'; Johnston (yellow card) 16'	Report	Sinclair 29'; Shim 47'	Stadium: Village of Lisle-Benedictine University Sports Complex; Attendance: 2,136; Referee: Levi Rippy

May 9, 2015 4	Portland Thorns FC	2–2	Washington Spirit	Portland, Oregon
19:00 (PDT)	Shim 28'; Van Hollebeke (yellow card) 34'; Long 51'	Report	Dunn 3'; Ordega 14'	Stadium: Providence Park; Attendance: 14,236; Referee: Elvis Mahmutovic

May 16, 2015 5	Boston Breakers	1–0	Portland Thorns FC	Boston
13:00 (PDT)	Mewis 93+'	Report	Williamson (yellow card) 40'; Betos (yellow card) 92'	Stadium: Soldiers Field Soccer Stadium; Attendance: 2,669; Referee: Christopher Spivey

May 23, 2015 6	Portland Thorns FC	0–1	Houston Dash	Portland, Oregon
19:00 (PDT)		Report	McDonald 24'; Pressley (yellow card) 86'	Stadium: Providence Park; Attendance: 14,409; Referee: Matthew Kreitzer

May 30, 2015 7	Washington Spirit	2–1	Portland Thorns FC	Germantown, Maryland
16:00 (PDT)	DaCosta 26' (unassisted); Dunn 28' (unassisted); Johnson (yellow card) 61'	Report	Anonma 18' (Long); Long (yellow card) 57'; Williamson (yellow card) 61'; Farrelly (yellow card) 71'; Jackson (yellow card) 72'	Stadium: Maureen Hendricks Field Maryland SoccerPlex; Attendance: 3,519; Referee: Farhad Dadkho

June 6, 2015 8	Houston Dash	0–0	Portland Thorns FC	Houston
17:30 (PDT)	Pereira (yellow card) 35'; Bock (yellow card) 45'	Report	Terry (yellow card) 65'	Stadium: BBVA Compass Stadium; Attendance: 4,864; Referee: Danielle Chesky

June 19, 2015 9	Portland Thorns FC	1–1	FC Kansas City	Portland, Oregon
19:00 (PDT)	Long (yellow card) 44'; Johnson (yellow card) 60'; Zerboni (red card) 70'; Betos 90+5'	Report	Hagen 51' (yellow card) 61'; Groom (yellow card) 71'	Stadium: Providence Park; Attendance: 15,214; Referee: Brandon Artis

July 3, 2015 10	Portland Thorns FC	2–1	Sky Blue FC	Portland, Oregon
19:00 (PDT)	Kyle (yellow card) 54'; Long 70' (pen.); Farrelly 79' (Kleiner)	Report	Freels 27' (Lytle); Stanton (yellow card) 56'; Levin (red card) 69'; Foord (yellow card) 80'	Stadium: Providence Park; Attendance: 12,223; Referee: Levi Rippy

July 11, 2015 11	Sky Blue FC	1–0	Portland Thorns FC	Piscataway, New Jersey
16:00 (PDT)	Kerr 52' (Hayes)	Report		Stadium: Yurcak Field; Attendance: 3,014; Referee: Randall Kelley

July 22, 2015 12	Portland Thorns FC	0–1	Seattle Reign FC	Portland, Oregon
19:00 (PDT)		Report	Little 57'; Cox (yellow card) 90+3'	Stadium: Providence Park; Attendance: 21,144; Referee: Karen Abt

July 26, 2015 13	Seattle Reign FC	3–0	Portland Thorns FC	Seattle, Washington
16:00 (PDT)	Fishlock 38'; Yanez 46', 50'	Report	Johnson (yellow card) 82'; Anonma (yellow card) 89'	Stadium: Memorial Stadium; Attendance: 6,303; Referee: Matthew Franz

July 29, 2015 14	Western New York Flash	0–2	Portland Thorns FC	Rochester, New York
16:00 (PDT)		Report	Williamson (yellow card) 28'; Sinclair 33'; Zerboni (yellow card) 79'; Long 80'	Stadium: Sahlen's Stadium; Attendance: 2,979; Referee: Brandon Artis

August 5, 2015 15	Portland Thorns FC	5–2	Boston Breakers	Portland, Oregon
19:00 (PDT)	Taylor 16'; Zerboni 49', 53'; Shim 54'; Long 66'	Report	Pires (yellow card) 30'; Williamson 36' (o.g.); Mewis 87' (pen.)	Stadium: Providence Park; Attendance: 15,624; Referee: Matthew Kreitzer

August 9, 2015 16	Portland Thorns FC	2–1	Chicago Red Stars	Portland, Oregon
19:00 (PDT)	Long 38', 69' (Farrelly)	Report	Mautz 29'	Stadium: Providence Park; Attendance: 15,858; Referee: Margaret Domka

August 12, 2015 17	FC Kansas City	3–0	Portland Thorns FC	Kansas City, Missouri
17:00 (PDT)	Laddish 60' (Robinson); Rodriguez 63' (O'Reilly); Tymrak 76' (Laddish)	PTFC report NWSL report	Menges (yellow card) 70'	Stadium: Swope Soccer Village; Attendance: 2,982; Referee: Ekaterina Koroleva

August 22, 2015 18	Sky Blue FC	1–0	Portland Thorns FC	Piscataway, New Jersey
16:00 (PDT)	Nadim 19' (O'Hara); Haagsma (yellow card) 59'; Killion (yellow card) 73'; Cameron (yellow card) 89'	Report	Zerboni (yellow card) 68'	Stadium: Yurcak Field; Attendance: 5,547; Referee: Farhad Dadkho

August 30, 2015 19	Portland Thorns FC	3–3	Washington Spirit	Portland, Oregon
18:00 (PDT)	Morgan 53' (Sanderson); Long (yellow card) 67'; Heath 71' (pen.); Taylor 80' (Morgan); Williamson (yellow card) 86'		Ordega 6' (Dunn); Matheson (yellow card) 17'; Dunn 45+1', 81'	Stadium: Providence Park; Attendance: 21,144; Referee: Ekaterina Koroleva

September 4, 2015 20	Western New York Flash	3–2	Portland Thorns FC	Rochester, New York
16:00 (PDT)	Ayinde 6' (Heyman); Spencer 8' (Heyman); Mewis 24'; B.Taylor (yellow card) 65'	Report	J.Taylor 29' (Morgan); Morgan (yellow card) 59'; Farrelly (yellow card) 62'; Long 90+2' (Shim)	Stadium: Sahlen's Stadium; Attendance: 4,147; Referee: Karen Abt

==== Standings ====
Pos	Team	Pld	W	D	L	GF	GA	GD	Pts	Qualification
1	Seattle Reign FC	20	13	4	3	41	21	+20	43	NWSL Shield
2	Chicago Red Stars	20	8	9	3	31	22	+9	33	NWSL Playoffs
3	FC Kansas City (C)	20	9	5	6	32	20	+12	32	NWSL Playoffs
4	Washington Spirit	20	8	6	6	31	28	+3	30	NWSL Playoffs
5	Houston Dash	20	6	6	8	21	26	−5	24	
6	Portland Thorns FC	20	6	5	9	27	29	−2	23	
7	Western New York Flash	20	6	5	9	24	34	−10	23	
8	Sky Blue FC	20	5	7	8	22	28	−6	22	
9	Boston Breakers	20	4	3	13	22	43	−21	15	

Source: NWSL
Rules for classification: Tiebreakers
(C) Champions

Results summary

Overall								Home						Away					
Pld	Pts	W	L	T	GF	GA	GD	W	L	T	GF	GA	GD	W	L	T	GF	GA	GD
20	23	6	9	5	27	29	−2	5	2	3	20	13	+7	1	7	2	7	16	−9

Last updated: September 5, 2015
Source: National Women's Soccer League
Pld = Matches played; Pts = Points; W = Matches won; T = Matches tied; L = Matches lost; GF = Goals for; GA = Goals against; GD = Goal difference

Results by round

Round	1	2	3	4	5	6	7	8	9	10	11	12	13	14	15	16	17	18	19	20
Stadium	H	H	A	H	A	H	A	A	H	H	A	H	A	A	H	H	A	A	H	A
Result	W	W	D	D	L	L	L	D	D	W	L	L	L	W	W	W	L	L	D	L

Updated to match(es) played on September 5, 2015. Source: National Women's Soccer League
A = Away; H = Home; W = Win; D = Draw; L = Loss

== Squad statistics ==
Source: NWSL

Key to positions: FW – Forward, MF – Midfielder, DF – Defender, GK – Goalkeeper

N	Pos	Player	GP	GS	Min	G	A	WG	Shot	SOG	Cro	CK	Off	Foul	FS	YC	RC
8	FW	Genoveva Añonma	12	8	759	1	1	0	32	11	1	0	14	16	3	1	0
(Note: Number 23 was later assigned to Lianne Sanderson)23	MF	Kate Bennett	1	1	45	0	0	0	0	0	0	0	0	2	2	0	0
4	DF	Stephanie Catley	3	2	179	0	0	0	0	0	0	0	0	0	0	0	0
26	DF	Taylor Comeau	9	5	377	0	0	0	5	2	0	0	3	1	2	0	0
7	MF	Sinead Farrelly	19	19	1652	2	2	1	18	8	1	0	9	32	27	2	0
29	FW	Kelsey Haycook	4	1	81	0	0	0	1	0	0	0	0	2	1	0	0
17	MF	Tobin Heath	12	12	1062	1	1	0	22	5	0	12	3	12	15	0	0
20	FW	Sarah Jackson	7	2	201	0	0	0	4	2	0	0	5	1	1	1	0
15	DF	Kendall Johnson	17	12	1218	0	1	0	10	5	4	0	0	18	20	2	0
30	DF	Alyssa Kleiner	8	4	418	0	1	0	3	0	0	0	0	3	3	0	0
11	DF	Kaylyn Kyle	12	6	587	0	0	0	4	1	0	1	4	12	7	1	0
10	MF	Allie Long	20	20	1793	10	4	2	53	27	0	66	24	22	32	3	0
2	DF	Emily Menges	17	17	1529	0	0	0	1	0	0	0	1	6	9	1	0
13	FW	Alex Morgan	4	3	285	1	2	0	15	7	0	0	5	0	4	1	0
25	DF	Courtney Niemiec	4	3	273	0	0	0	1	1	1	0	0	1	2	0	0
9	DF	Clare Polkinghorne	9	9	779	0	0	0	2	0	0	0	0	4	2	0	0
(Note: Number 21 was later assigned to Emily Menges)21	MF	Sarah Robbins	1	0	2	0	0	0	0	0	0	0	0	0	0	0	0
23	FW	Lianne Sanderson	5	2	275	0	1	0	4	1	0	0	0	2	5	0	0
6	MF	Meleana Shim	18	13	1127	4	4	1	21	13	4	9	0	7	6	0	0
12	FW	Christine Sinclair	9	8	735	2	2	1	15	8	0	0	7	6	4	0	0
14	FW	Jodie Taylor	7	5	385	3	0	0	17	6	0	1	10	1	2	0	0
28	FW	Hanna Terry	6	0	130	0	0	0	1	0	0	1	2	2	2	1	0
16	DF	Rachel Van Hollebeke	13	10	879	0	0	0	1	0	0	0	1	3	2	1	0
22	DF	Rhian Wilkinson	1	0	45	0	0	0	0	0	0	0	0	1	0	1	0
5	DF	Kat Williamson	20	20	1705	0	1	0	3	1	0	0	1	4	8	4	0
77	MF	McCall Zerboni	18	18	1459	2	0	1	7	4	0	0	2	28	18	2	1

N	Pos	Goal keeper	GP	GS	Min	W	L	T	Shot	SOG	Sav	GA	GA/G	Pen	PKF	SO
1	GK	Nadine Angerer	6	6	540	1	2	3	77	34	23	11	1.833	0	0	1
18	GK	Michelle Betos	14	14	1260	5	7	2	130	63	45	18	1.286	1	2	2

== Player Transactions ==
=== National Team Player Allocation ===
On January 14, 2015, the league held its NWSL Player Allocation with Portland receiving six players: returning United States women's national soccer team players Alex Morgan, Rachel Van Hollebeke, and Tobin Heath, returning Canada women's national soccer team player Christine Sinclair, and new Canadian internationals Kaylyn Kyle, and Rhian Wilkinson.

=== National Women's Soccer League College Draft ===
The Thorns did not have a pick in the 2015 NWSL College Draft, but through a series of draft day trades they acquired forward and England women's national football team player Jodie Taylor from the Washington Spirit.

=== Transfers In ===
Date	Player	Pos	Previous club	Notes	Ref
November 6, 2014	(United States) Kat Williamson	DF	(United States) Western New York Flash	Part of trade for Amber Brooks.	
November 6, 2014	(United States) McCall Zerboni	MF	(United States) Western New York Flash	Part of trade for Amber Brooks.	
January 14, 2015	(United States) Kendall Johnson	DF	(Australia) Western Sydney Wanderers	Rights traded from Sky Blue FC for the 25th and 34th overall selections in the 2015 NWSL College Draft.	
January 14, 2015	(Canada) Kaylyn Kyle	MF	(United States) Houston Dash	NWSL Player Allocation	
January 14, 2015	(Canada) Rhian Wilkinson	DF	(Canada) Laval Comets	NWSL Player Allocation	
January 16, 2015	(England) Jodie Taylor	FW	(United States) Washington Spirit	Traded for the 13th pick in the 2015 NWSL College Draft and two second-round picks in the 2016 NWSL College Draft.	
February 24, 2015	(Equatorial Guinea) Genoveva Añonma	FW	(Germany) 1. FFC Turbine Potsdam		
February 26, 2015	(Canada) Sarah Robbins	MF	(Finland) Åland United		
April 10, 2015	(United States) Taylor Comeau	DF	(United States) California	Amateur call-up	
April 10, 2015	(United States) Kelsey Haycook	FW	(United States) La Salle	Amateur call-up	
April 10, 2015	(United States) Sarah Jackson	FW	(United States) Santa Clara	Amateur call-up	
April 17, 2015	(United States) Alyssa Kleiner	DF	(United States) Santa Clara	Amateur call-up	

=== Transfers Out ===
Date	Player	Pos	Destination Club	Notes	Ref
August 25, 2014	(Spain) Verónica Boquete	MF	(Germany) 1. FFC Frankfurt		
September 10, 2014	(United States) Angie Kerr	MF	None	Player waived.	
November 6, 2014	(United States) Amber Brooks	MF	(United States) Western New York Flash	Trade to acquire Kat Williamson and McCall Zerboni.	
November 18, 2014	(United States) Sarah Huffman	DF	None	Player retired.	
January 14, 2015	(Mexico) Jackie Acevedo	FW	None	Player not reallocated in the 2015 NWSL Player Allocation.	
January 16, 2015	(United States) Jessica McDonald	FW	(United States) Houston Dash	Traded to acquire the 13th pick in the 2015 NWSL College Draft and a second-round pick in the 2016 NWSL College Draft.	
January 20, 2015	(United States) Rebecca Moros	DF	(United States) FC Kansas City	Traded to acquire an international roster spot.	
February 5, 2015	(United States) Nikki Marshall	DF	None	Player retired.	

=== National team participation ===
Several Thorns players have been selected to play for their national teams in the 2015 FIFA Women's World Cup in Vancouver, British Columbia, Canada.

Team	Players
Australia	Stephanie Catley
Canada	Christine Sinclair (captain), Kaylyn Kyle, Rhian Wilkinson
England	Jodie Taylor
Germany	Nadine Angerer (captain)
United States	Tobin Heath, Alex Morgan

== See also ==
- 2015 National Women's Soccer League season
