= Allie Long =

American soccer player (born 1987)

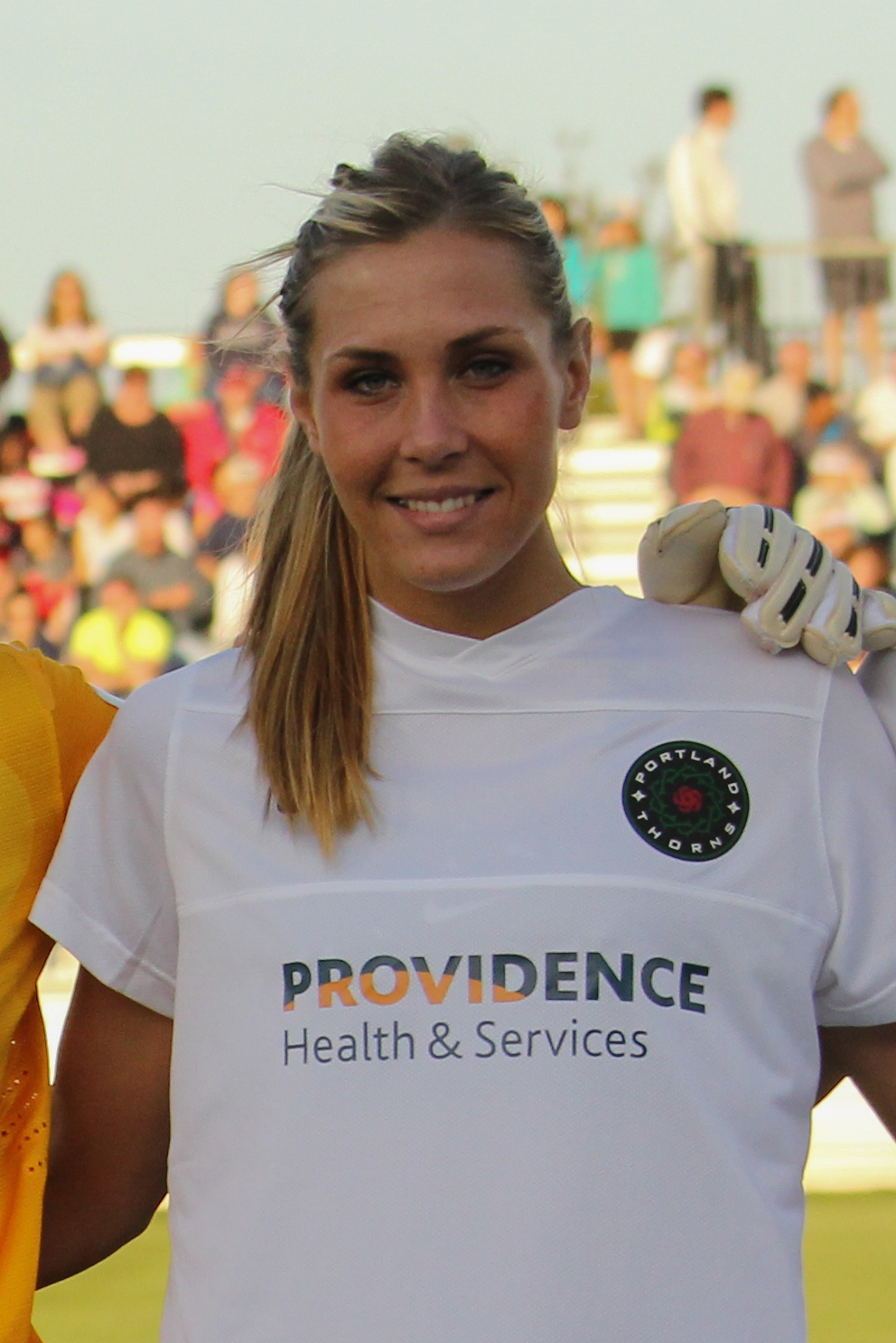
- Long with the Portland Thorns in 2013

Personal information
- Full name: Alexandra Linsley Long
- Date of birth: August 13, 1987 (age 39)
- Place of birth: Northport, New York, United States
- Height: 5 ft 8 in (1.73 m)
- Position: Midfielder

Youth career
- Northport Cow Harbor Mustangs
- Albertson Express

College career
Years	Team	Apps	(Gls)
2005–2006	Penn State Nittany Lions		
2007–2008	North Carolina Tar Heels		

Senior career*
Years	Team	Apps	(Gls)
- Long Island Fury
2009–2010	Washington Freedom	39	(4)
2011	Sky Blue FC	18	(3)
2011–2012	Paris Saint-Germain	12	(4)
2012	New York Fury		(1)
2013–2017	Portland Thorns FC	105	(30)
2013	→ Chelsea (loan)	0	(0)
2018–2021	OL Reign	38	(3)
2021–2023	Gotham FC	39	(3)
2024	Kansas City Current	0	(0)
2026	Fort Lauderdale United	3	(0)

International career
- United States U20
2007–2010	United States U21		
2014–2019	United States	51	(8)
Medal record
Women's soccer
Representing the United States
FIFA Women's World Cup
Gold medal – first place	2019 France	Team
- * Club domestic league appearances and goals as of 03:36, May 18, 2026 (UTC)

Alexandra Linsley Long (born August 13, 1987) is an American professional soccer player who plays as a midfielder. She is a three-time National Women's Soccer League (NWSL) champion, three-time NWSL Best XI selection, and FIFA Women's World Cup champion with the United States national team in 2019.

Long played college soccer for the Penn State Nittany Lions and the North Carolina Tar Heels, winning the national championship with the latter in 2008. She was drafted by the Washington Freedom in the first round of the 2009 WPS Draft and also played in WPS for Sky Blue FC. After the league's three seasons, she played for Paris Saint-Germain in France's Division 1 Féminine and New York Fury in the Women's Premier Soccer League Elite.

When the NWSL started in 2013, Long became one of the league's early stars with the Portland Thorns, winning two NWSL Championships (2013 and 2017), one NWSL Shield (2016), and NWSL Best XI or Second XI honors three times. She also played in the NWSL for the Seattle Reign and NJ/NY Gotham FC, winning her third NWSL title with the latter in 2023.

== Early life ==
Born in Huntington, New York, to Barbara and James Long (died November 6, 2025), Allie was raised with her younger brother Patrick. She started playing soccer for the Northport Cow Harbor Mustangs of the Long Island Junior Soccer League. She then played with the Albertson Soccer Club, where she won four consecutive State Open Cup titles. Long was a member of the Olympic Development Program of the Eastern New York Youth Soccer Association for five years and Region 1 ODP for four years.

Long attended Northport High School from 2001 to 2005, where she played varsity soccer for four years. Long helped her high school team go undefeated in the regular season for all four years. In 2005, Northport advanced to the Long Island semifinals. Long was named to the All-State first team and All-County team all four years at Northport. After her junior and senior year, she was Newsday's Player of the Year and Suffolk County Player of the Year. Long also made the All-Long Island Team for her last two years at Northport.

=== Pennsylvania State University, 2005–2006 ===
Long attended Pennsylvania State University from 2005–2006. During her freshman year in 2005, she appeared in all 25 games, starting 22. After starting the first game, she entered the starting lineup permanently in the fifth game of the season, remaining there for the balance of the Lions' 23–0–2 season. She scored four goals on 58 shots and had six assists for the season. Long was a 2005 National Soccer Coaches Association of America Third-Team All-Mid-Atlantic Region selection and was named to the Soccer Buzz second-team All-Mid-Atlantic Region, Soccer Buzz second-team freshman All-America squad, and was tapped for the Soccer Buzz 2005 Freshman All-Mid-Atlantic Region Team. She was also named to the second-team All-Big Ten squad and the All-Tournament Team at the 2005 Big Ten Tournament and earned Big Ten All-Freshman Team honors.

During her second year in 2006, Long scored six goals and added four assists for the Nittany Lions. Allie started all 21 games that she played in after missing the first five games while playing for the United States in the U-20 World Championships in Moscow, Russia. She scored her first goal of the season September 24 against Michigan. She also recorded a goal and an assist in the game at Iowa on September 29 and against Northwestern on October 22. Long scored the game-winning goal against Minnesota on October 13 and against Illinois in the Big Ten Tournament on November 5. She was a first-team All-Big Ten selection and was named to the National Soccer Coaches Association first-team All-Mid-Atlantic Region team. She was the Big Ten's offensive player of the week on October 23, 2006. She was a 2006 Soccer Buzz first-team all-region selection and was selected for the Academic All-Big Ten Team.

=== University of North Carolina at Chapel Hill, 2007–2008 ===
During her junior year in 2007, Long transferred to the University of North Carolina at Chapel Hill. She appeared in all 24 games, starting in 22. Long scored five goals during the season. She picked up her first two goals as a Tar Heel against Yale for her only multiple goal game of the season, for which she was named to Soccer America, Soccer Buzz and Top Drawer Soccer National Teams of the Week. She was also on the watchlist for the Hermann Trophy.

== Club career ==
=== Long Island Fury ===
Long played with the Long Island Fury in the Women's Premier Soccer League under head coach Paul Riley during summers between college seasons.

=== Washington Freedom, 2009–2010 ===
On January 16, 2009, Long was selected seventh overall in the first round of the 2009 Women's Professional Soccer Draft by the Washington Freedom for the inaugural 2009 WPS season. She made her first appearance for the team on March 29, 2009 in a match against the Los Angeles Sol. During the 2009 regular season, Long made 18 appearances for the Freedom, helping the team finish third in the WPS. She also made two goals during the regular season. The Freedom faced Sky Blue FC in the first round of the playoffs on August 15 and were defeated 2–1, ending their advancement in the postseason tournament. Long remained with the Washington Freedom for the 2010 WPS season. Long scored the lone goal in the team's opening game of the season on April 10 against the Boston Breakers. She went on to make 21 appearances for the Freedom in the regular season and scored two goals. The Freedom finished fourth in the WPS after the regular season but were defeated by the Philadelphia Independence in the first round of the playoffs on September 19.

=== Sky Blue FC, 2011 ===
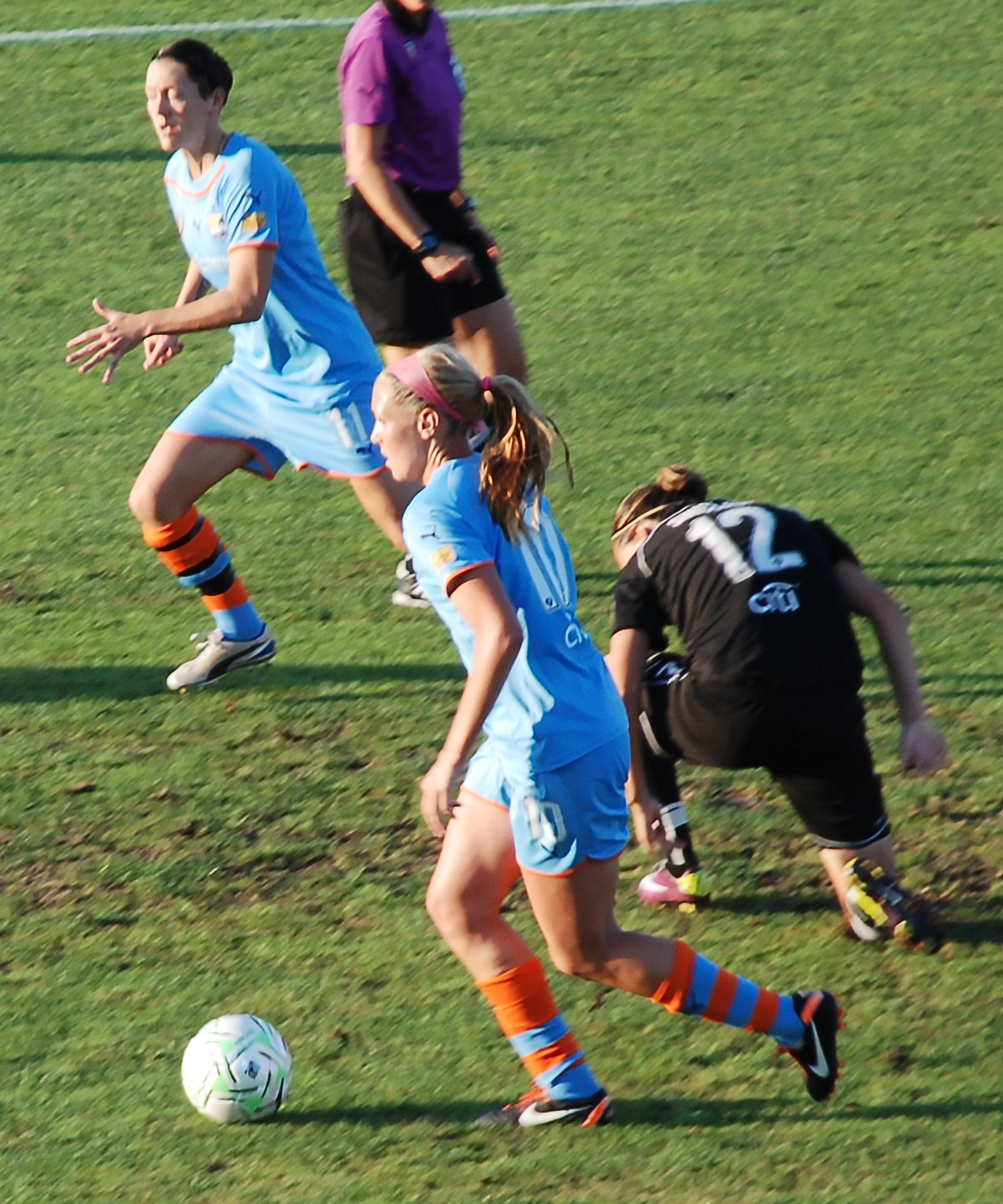
Long wins the ball from Christine Sinclair during a match between Sky Blue FC and Western New York Flash on July 30, 2011.

Following the 2010 season, Long became a free agent and was subsequently signed by Sky Blue FC in November 2010. Jim Gabarra, the head coach of Sky Blue, stated that "Allie has been establishing herself as a prominent player in this league" and that he expected her to "continue developing and helping our team to be successful." She made her first appearance for Sky Blue on April 10, 2011 in a match against Philadelphia Independence. Following the match, Long was named the WPS Player of the Week. Long made 18 appearances for Sky Blue in the regular season and scored three goals, two of those on penalty kicks. Sky Blue finished fifth in the WPS after the regular season and did not advance to the playoffs.

=== Paris Saint-Germain, 2011–2012 ===
Immediately following the 2011 WPS season, Long played for Paris Saint-Germain in the Division 1 Féminine in France for the 2011–2012 season, which ran from September to June. She first made an appearance for the team on October 16, 2011 in a match against FF Yzeure Allier Auvergne. She made 12 appearances for the team, starting nine, and scored four goals. Her last appearance for the team was on March 25, 2012.

=== New York Fury, 2012 ===
On January 30, 2012, it was announced that the 2012 WPS season would be suspended following legal and financial challenges. Although the league was intended to resume for the 2013 season, it officially folded in May. In April 2012, Long signed with the New York Fury in the Women's Premier Soccer League Elite, a semi-professional soccer league created by the WPSL in response to the suspension of the WPS. The Fury finished third in the league and qualified for the playoffs. The Fury faced the Western New York Flash on July 25, 2012 in the semifinals. Long scored the Fury's lone goal of the match and the team was defeated 2–1.

=== Portland Thorns FC, 2013–2017 ===
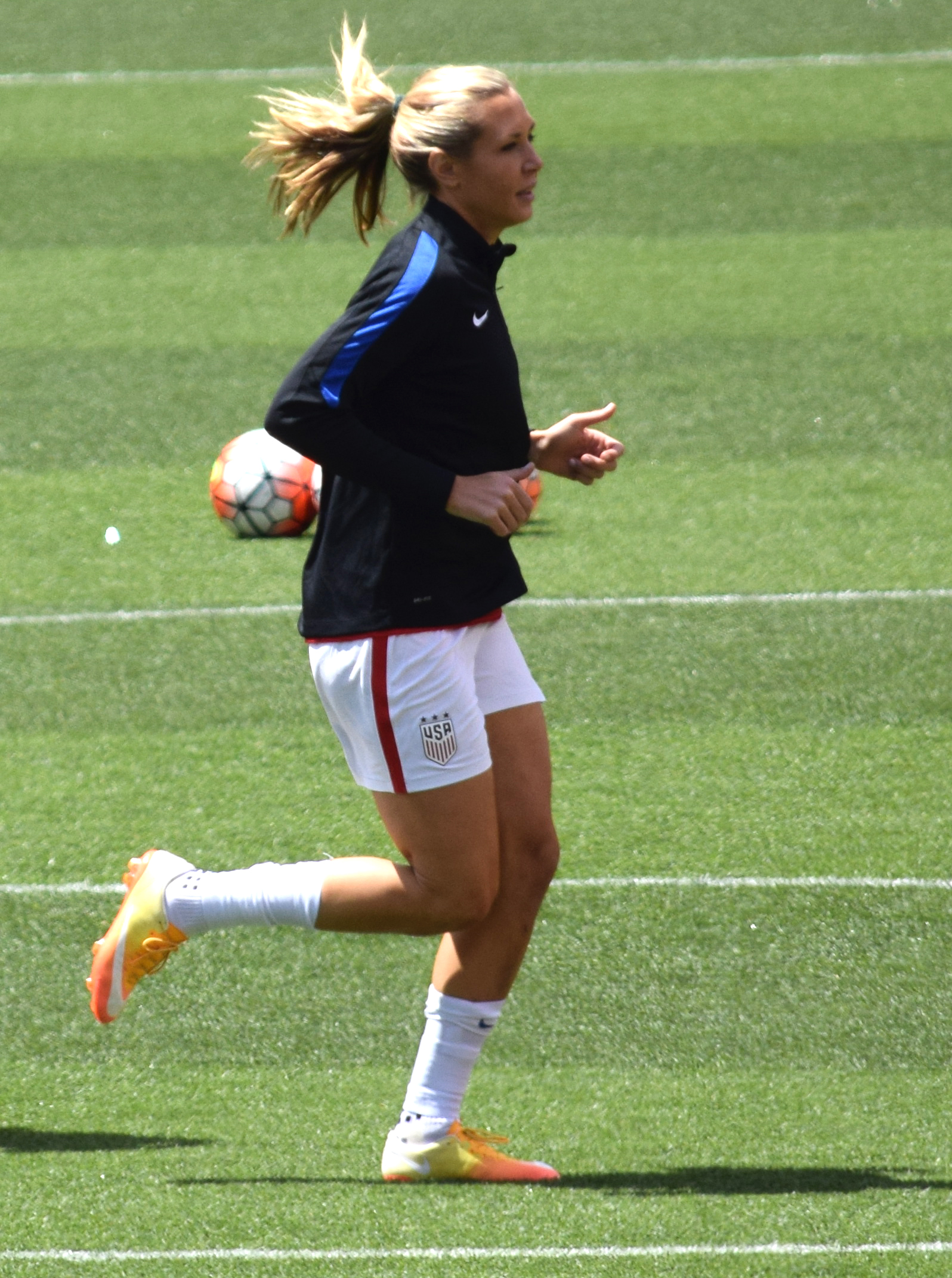
Long with the United States women's national team before a match against Japan on June 5, 2016

On January 17, 2013, it was revealed that Long had signed with the Portland Thorns FC of the newly formed National Women's Soccer League for the 2013 season. Long became one of Portland's top players over the years, scoring the most goals in the 2015 season and leading the team to the title in 2013, the semifinal in 2014 and 2016, and the title again in 2017. At the end of the Thorns' 2017 season, she had the most appearances for the team over its five seasons and was its second-leading scorer, one goal behind captain Christine Sinclair.

==== Chelsea FC, 2013 (loan) ====
Following the 2013 NWSL season, Long agreed to a brief off-season loan to Chelsea Ladies. She played in Chelsea's International Women's Club Championship campaign in Japan and returned to Portland afterwards without appearing in a league match.

=== Reign FC, 2018–2021 ===
On January 11, 2018, Long was traded to Seattle Reign FC in exchange for Australian international forward Caitlin Foord and a 2020 NWSL 2nd Round draft pick.

Long appeared in 19 regular season games for Seattle in 2018 and scored three goals. She missed the last three games of the regular season due to a knee injury but returned to the lineup for Seattle's semi-final match against her former team, the Portland Thorns FC. Seattle lost to Portland, 2–1.

=== NJ/NY Gotham FC, 2021–2023 ===
On April 27, 2021, NJ/NY Gotham FC acquired Long from OL Reign in exchange for $80,000 in allocation money and a second round draft pick.

=== Kansas City Current, 2024 ===
In July 2024, Long signed an injury replacement contract with the Kansas City Current, debuting in their NWSL x Liga MX Femenil Summer Cup match against Pachuca.

=== Fort Lauderdale United, 2026 ===
On April 17, 2026, after several years without a club, Long signed with USL Super League club Fort Lauderdale United for the rest of the season, becoming the first World Cup champion to play in the USL Super League. She made three substitute appearances before departing from Fort Lauderdale at the end of the season.

== Futsal ==
For several years during her professional career, Long has played indoor soccer, futsal, in Queens and Brooklyn, New York City. She plays in high-school gymnasiums on highly-competitive men's teams for prize money. She is a favorite with spectators, mostly Latinos, who call her "la rubia" (blondie) and "la blanquita" (little white girl). She was introduced to futsal by her then-boyfriend Jose Batista, formerly a professional soccer player and a futsal player.

== International career ==
Long represented the United States on the U-20 and U-23 national teams and was a member of the 2006 U-20 Women's World Championship team. She was called up to the full national team in July 2010.

On May 8, 2014 Long made her international debut for the United States senior women's team against Canada in a friendly match at Winnipeg; entering the match at the 68th minute. She scored her first and second goals in a friendly against Colombia on April 6, 2016, in East Hartford at Renschler Field.

Long was on the U.S. national team at the 2016 Olympics, starting in three of the four matches the U.S. team played.

After the Olympics and into early 2017, USWNT coach Jill Ellis experimented with different formations and Long started several matches playing centre-back as part of a three back. After having mixed results with the three back, Ellis shifted back to a traditional four back and Long moved back to her normal midfield position.

Following the Olympics, Long remained on the bubble of the senior team roster while coach Jill Ellis experimented with new talent. Long was named to the provisional roster for the 2018 CONCACAF Women's Championship but was not named to the final 20-player roster. In November 2018, Long was included in the roster for a set of friendlies in Europe in November 2018, making an appearance off the bench in the team's match against Scotland. In 2019, she was not included in the 26-player training camp in January, and in February was named to the pre-tournament training camp but not the final 23-player roster for the SheBelieves Cup. Long made appearances off the bench in both April 2019 friendlies for the USWNT against Australia and Belgium.

In May 2019, Long was named to the final roster for the 2019 FIFA Women's World Cup, marking her first senior World Cup appearance.

== Personal life ==
Allie began her relationship with Jose Batista in January 2008.

On October 29, 2016, Long married long-time boyfriend Jose Batista, with teammates Alex Morgan and Tobin Heath as her maids of honor. Long began living apart from Batista in fall 2020 and permanently separated in summer 2021.

In January 2022, Long publicly announced that she and Batista separated. Long filled for divorce in February 2022. Their divorce was finalized in November 2024

Long met sports chiropractor Casey Cordial during the 2020 NWSL Challenge Cup while representing OL Reign in Utah. Their professional relationship began shortly thereafter, with Cordial serving as Long's trainer from the summer of 2020.

Since June 2021, Long has been in a relationship with Casey Cordial. Cordial has two children, from his marriage to 'marriage and family therapist' Maureen Cordial. Following their separation in early 2021, the divorce was finalized in August 2022.

In April 2022, Long announced that she is expecting twins with boyfriend Casey Cordial. On May 23, 2022, Long gave birth to a girl Siena Maxwell and a boy Trent Jameson.

In late 2023, Long and Cordial became owners of Renu Wellness Spa, which was later rebranded as The Peak Wellness Spa. The pair subsequently exited the business to pursue other ventures. Since 2025, the spa has been owned and operated by Peak Health and Wellness Center.

== Career statistics ==
=== Club ===
Club	Season	League			Cup (Note: Includes the NWSL Challenge Cup)		Playoffs (Note: Includes NWSL Playoffs)		Other		Total	
Club	Season	Division	Apps	Goals	Apps	Goals	Apps	Goals	Apps	Goals	Apps	Goals
Portland Thorns FC	2013	NWSL	22	3	—		2	0	—		24	3
Portland Thorns FC	2014	NWSL	22	9	—		1	0	—		23	9
Portland Thorns FC	2015	NWSL	20	10	—		—		—		20	10
Portland Thorns FC	2016	NWSL	15	6	—		1	0	—		16	6
Portland Thorns FC	2017	NWSL	21	2	—		2	0	—		23	2
OL Reign	2018	NWSL	19	3	—		1	0	—		20	3
OL Reign	2019	NWSL	14	0	—		1	0	—		15	0
OL Reign	2020	NWSL	—		3	0	—		3 (Note: Includes the NWSL Fall Series)	0	6	0
NJ/NY Gotham FC	2021	NWSL	23	1	2	0	1	0	—		26	1
NJ/NY Gotham FC	2022	NWSL	0	0	0	0	—		—		0	0
NJ/NY Gotham FC	2023	NWSL	16	2	5	0	3	0	—		24	2
Career total			172	36	10	0	12	0	3	0	197	36

=== International ===
Appearances and goals by national team and year
National team	Year	Apps	Goals
United States	2014	4	0
United States	2015	0	0
United States	2016	16	3
United States	2017	13	3
United States	2018	7	0
United States	2019	11	2
Total		51	8

Scores and results list United States goal tally first, score column indicates score after each Long goal.

List of international goals scored by Allie Long
No.	Date	Venue	Opponent	Score	Result	Competition	Ref.
1	April 6, 2016	East Hartford, Connecticut	Colombia	2–0	7–0	Friendly	
2	April 6, 2016	East Hartford, Connecticut	Colombia	6–0	7–0	Friendly	
3	September 18, 2016	Atlanta, Georgia	Netherlands	3–1	3–1	Friendly	
4	April 6, 2017	Frisco, Texas	Russia	2–0	4–0	Friendly	
5	April 6, 2017	Frisco, Texas	Russia	4–0	4–0	Friendly	
6	October 22, 2017	Cary, North Carolina	South Korea	6–0	6–0	Friendly	
7	August 29, 2019	Philadelphia, Pennsylvania	Portugal	4–0	4–0	Friendly	
8	October 3, 2019	Charlotte, North Carolina	South Korea	1–0	2–0	Friendly	

== Honors and awards ==
North Carolina Tar Heels

- NCAA Division I Women's Soccer Championship: 2008

Portland Thorns

- NWSL Championship: 2013, 2017
- NWSL Shield: 2016

NJ/NY Gotham FC

- NWSL Championship: 2023

United States

- FIFA Women's World Cup: 2019
- SheBelieves Cup: 2018
- Tournament of Nations: 2018

Individual

- NSCAA All-Mid-Atlantic Region Third Team: 2005
- Soccer Buzz All-Mid-Atlantic Region Second Team: 2005
- Soccer Buzz Freshman All-America Second Team: 2005
- Soccer Buzz Freshman All-Mid-Atlantic Region Team: 2005
- All-Big Ten Second Team: 2005
- All-Big Ten Tournament Team: 2005
- Big Ten All-Freshman Team: 2005
- All-Big Ten First Team: 2006
- NSCAA All-Mid-Atlantic Region First Team: 2006
- Soccer Buzz All-Mid-Atlantic Region First Team: 2006
- All-Big Ten Academic Team: 2006
- MAC Hermann Trophy Watch List: 2007
- Top Drawer Soccer Third Team: 2007
- NWSL Best XI: 2015, 2016
- NWSL Second XI: 2014
- Suffolk Sports Hall of Fame: 2020
