= Kelsey Haycook =

American soccer player

Personal information
- Date of birth: April 19, 1993 (age 33)
- Place of birth: Point Pleasant, New Jersey
- Height: 5 ft 9 in (1.75 m)
- Position: Forward

College career
Years	Team	Apps	(Gls)
2011–2014	La Salle Explorers	83	(60)

Senior career*
Years	Team	Apps	(Gls)
2015	Portland Thorns	4	(0)
2015	Vålerenga	9	(2)
- * Club domestic league appearances and goals

Kelsey Haycook (born April 19, 1993) is an American soccer player who played for the Portland Thorns FC.

== Early life and education ==
Haycook was born in Point Pleasant, New Jersey. She played prep basketball and soccer at Point Pleasant Borough High School, then attended La Salle University.

== Career ==
Haywood participated in New Jersey's Olympic Development Program for five years.

While studying at La Salle University, Haycook played for the university's women's soccer team, where she earned All-American honors twice. Her senior year, she was named the Atlantic 10 Conference's most valuable player. Upon graduation, she held university records for total goals (60), total points (142), and goals scored in a single season (20).

In 2015, Haycook signed to play with the Portland Thorns FC.
