= Sarah Robbins =

Canadian soccer player

Personal information
- Full name: Sarah Rebecca Robbins
- Date of birth: July 30, 1992 (age 34)
- Place of birth: Montreal, Quebec, Canada
- Height: 5 ft 7 in (1.70 m)
- Position: Midfielder

College career
Years	Team	Apps	(Gls)
2009–2012	Kansas Jayhawks	50	(1)

Senior career*
Years	Team	Apps	(Gls)
2009–2013	Laval Comets	40	(1)
2014	Åland United	19	(1)
2015	Portland Thorns FC	1	(0)
2015	Apollon Limassol	7	(2)

International career^{‡}
2012	Canada U20	3	(0)
- * Club domestic league appearances and goals as of April 15, 2015 ‡ National team caps and goals as of April 15, 2015

Sarah Rebecca Robbins (born July 30, 1992) is a Canadian soccer player from Montreal, Quebec. She last played for Portland Thorns FC of the National Women's Soccer League.

== Early life ==
Robbins was born in Montreal, Quebec.

Robbins attended University of Kansas where she played as a midfielder for the Jayhawks. Robbins made 50 appearances for the Jayhawks in 2009–12, averaging 52.8 minutes over 50 matches with a goal and four assists.

== Club career ==
Robins played with the Laval Comets of the USL W-League from 2009 to 2013, helping guide the club to the league championship match in 2013.

Robbins appeared in 14 matches, recording three goals and seven assists, for Finnish club Åland United in 2014. The midfielder logged 1,189 minutes for the Naisten Liiga side, and competed in the qualifying round of the 2014–15 UEFA Women's Champions League.

Robbins was signed by the Portland Thorns on February 26, 2015, as a free agent. She was waived on June 18, 2015, after only making one appearance for the team.

In the 2015–16 American off-season Robbins scored two goals in seven Cypriot First Division games with Apollon Limassol.
