= Kendall Johnson =

American soccer player

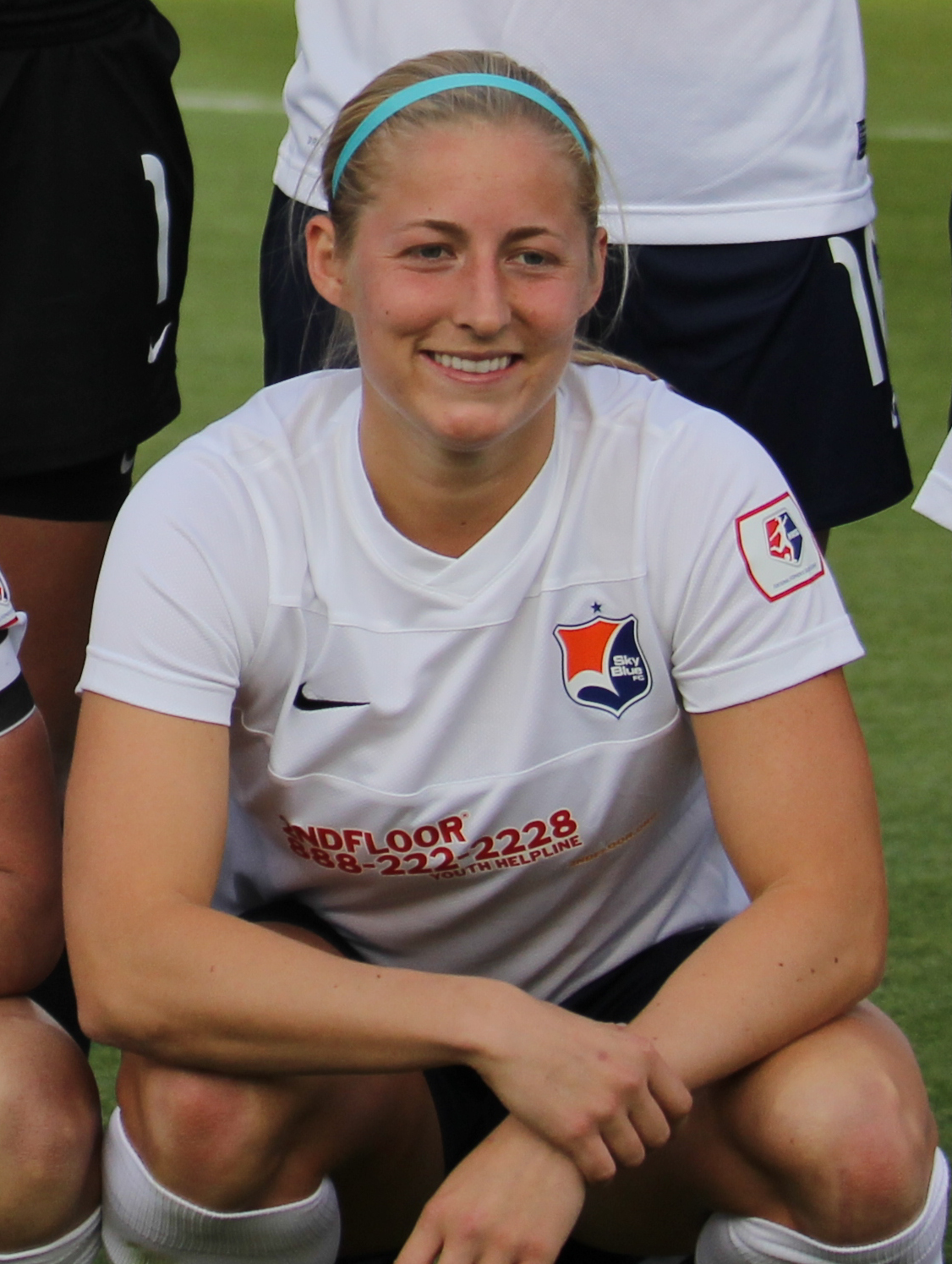

Personal information
- Full name: Kendall Elizabeth Johnson
- Date of birth: April 24, 1991 (age 35)
- Place of birth: Portland, Oregon, United States
- Height: 5 ft 5 in (1.65 m)
- Positions: Defender; midfielder

Youth career
- 2001–2009: FC Portland Sapphire

College career
Years	Team	Apps	(Gls)
2009–2012	Portland Pilots		

Senior career*
Years	Team	Apps	(Gls)
2012	Colorado Rush		
2013–2014	Sky Blue FC	37	(0)
2014	→ Western Sydney Wanderers (loan)	7	(0)
2015–2017	Portland Thorns FC	17	(0)
2015–2016	→ Western Sydney Wanderers (loan)	5	(0)

International career^{‡}
2009–2011	United States U20		
2012	United States U23		
- * Club domestic league appearances and goals as of September 8, 2016 ‡ National team caps and goals as of March 26, 2013

Kendall Elizabeth Johnson (born April 24, 1991) is an American professional women's soccer midfielder and defender. She played for the United States U-23 women's national soccer team.

== Early life ==
Kendall was born and raised in Portland, Oregon and attended Lincoln High School where she was a four-year letter-winner. In 2008, she was named ESPN First Team All-America and the Gatorade State Player of the Year. She was a two-time state player of the year in 2007 and 2008 and was a three-time all-state honoree and two-time Portland Interscholastic League Player of the Year. As a junior in 2007, her high school team went undefeated at 18–0–0 as she scored 12 goals and served 15 assists. Johnson led Lincoln to state titles in 2007 and 2008. The team was ranked third nationally and first regionally in the 2007 NSCAA High School rankings. It was ranked second nationally in 2008. As a senior, Johnson scored 16 goals and provided nine assists as captain of the team. She was also named the team's most valuable player.

Johnson played club soccer for FC Portland Sapphire from 2001 to 2009. The team was USYSA Region IV finalists in 2007, semifinalists in 2005 as well as three-time state champions in 2005, 2007, 2008.

=== University of Portland ===
Johnson attended the University of Portland where she played for the Pilots from 2009 to 2012. As a freshman in 2009, she played in 21 games starting 16, scored three goals and provided three assists. She was named to the All-West Coast Conference Second Team and was on the WCC All-Freshman Team. As a sophomore, she redshirted the season for medical reasons. During her junior year in 2010, she made 15 appearances for the Pilots, starting 13 games. She scored two goals and provided three assists. She assisted on the game's only goal in a 1–0 victory over Santa Clara and scored the game-winning goal against San Francisco. Johnson posted four points with the game-winner and two assists in Portland's 9–0 victory over University of Texas San Antonio in the first round of the NCAA playoffs. She was named to the All-WCC Second Team and was a WCC All-Academic Honorable Mention.

She postponed her senior year in college to play soccer professionally.

== Club career ==
=== Sky Blue FC ===
In January 2013, she was drafted in the second round (twelfth pick overall) of the 2013 NWSL College Draft to Sky Blue FC in the National Women's Soccer League.

=== Western Sydney Wanderers ===
On September 19, 2014, Johnson signed for the Western Sydney Wanderers.

=== Portland Thorns FC ===
On January 14, 2015, Portland Thorns FC acquired the rights to Johnson from Sky Blue FC in exchange for the 25th and 34th overall selections in the 2015 National Women's Soccer League College Draft.

== International career ==
Johnson has represented the United States at the U-20 and U-23 levels. She was first called into train with the U-20 team in December 2009. She was a member of the U.S. team that won the 2010 CONCACAF Women's U-20 Championship in Guatemala and played at the 2010 FIFA U-20 Women's World Cup in Germany.

== Honors ==
Portland Thorns FC

- NWSL Shield: 2016
