= Kaylyn Kyle =

Canadian soccer player (born 1988)

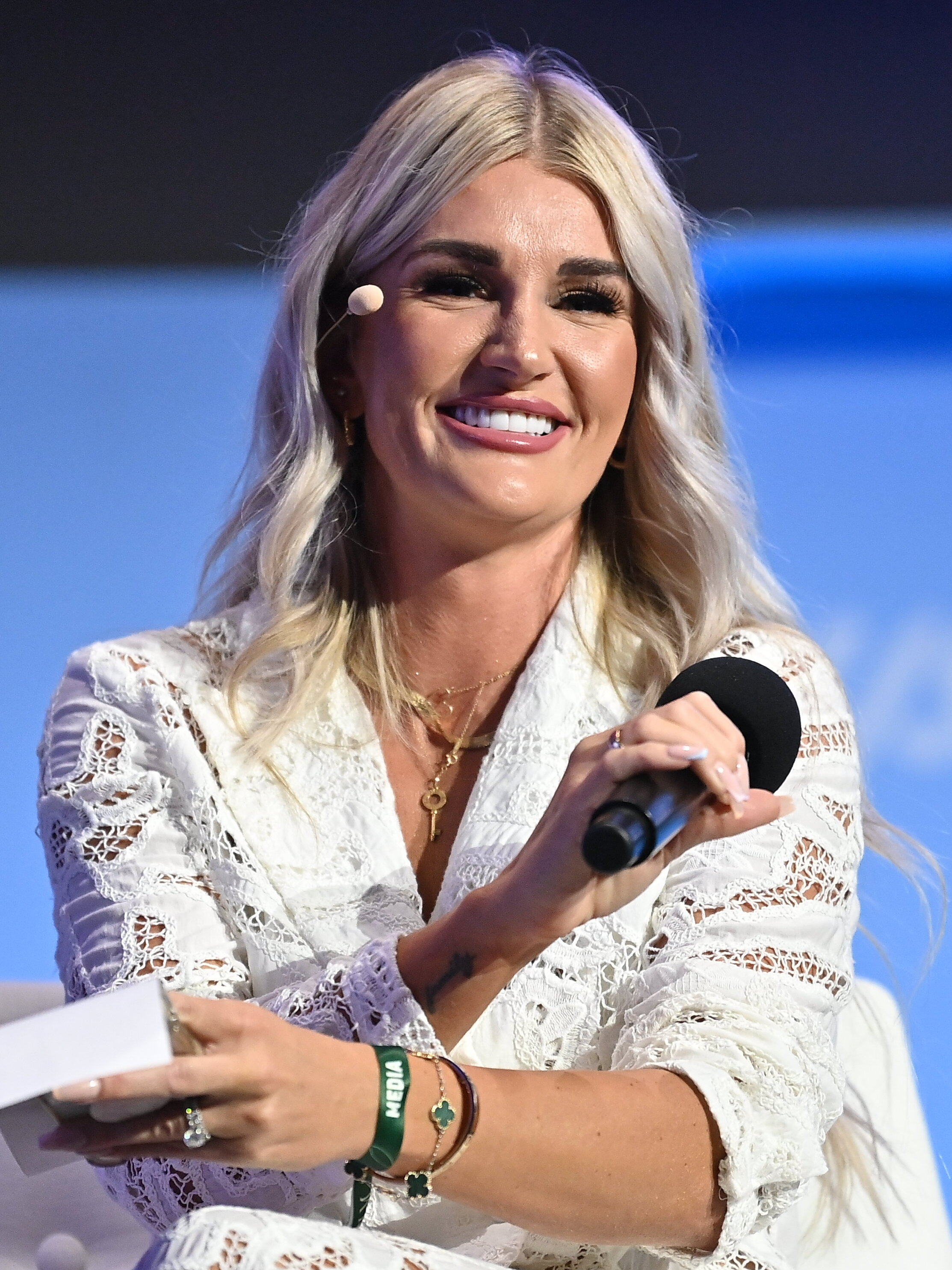
- Kyle in 2022

Personal information
- Full name: Kaylyn McKenzie Kyle
- Date of birth: October 6, 1988 (age 38)
- Place of birth: Saskatoon, Saskatchewan, Canada
- Height: 1.73 m (5 ft 8 in)
- Position: Midfielder

Youth career
- 2002–2003: National Training Centre

College career
Years	Team	Apps	(Gls)
2006	Saskatchewan Huskies		

Senior career*
Years	Team	Apps	(Gls)
2006–2008	Vancouver Whitecaps	15	(1)
2009	Piteå IF	13	(1)
2010–2012	Vancouver Whitecaps	5	(0)
2013	Seattle Reign FC	21	(3)
2014	Boston Breakers	2	(0)
2014	Houston Dash	19	(0)
2015	Portland Thorns FC	12	(0)
2016	Orlando Pride	17	(0)

International career
2004–2005	Canada U-17	7	(0)
2005–2008	Canada U-20	31	(0)
2008–2017	Canada	101	(6)
Medal record
Women's soccer
Representing Canada
Olympic Games
Bronze medal – third place	2012 London	Team
Pan American Games
Gold medal – first place	2011 Guadalajara	Team
- * Club domestic league appearances and goals

Kaylyn McKenzie Kyle (born October 6, 1988) is a Canadian former soccer player and member of the Canada national team, winning a bronze medal at the 2012 Summer Olympics. She is a Right To Play ambassador and currently serves as a lead host on BEIN English Channel.

== Early life ==
Born and raised in Saskatoon, Saskatchewan, Kyle attended Bishop Mahoney High School, where she helped the soccer team win both the city and provincial titles. Her father, Doug, was a professional hockey player and her mother, Pat, a competitive volleyball player. Her older sister Courtnee also played soccer at the national level.

Kyle was named Saskatchewan Soccer Association Youth Female Player of The Year in 2004, 2005 and 2006, and Senior Female Player of the Year in 2010 and 2011.

=== University of Saskatchewan ===
Kyle attended the University of Saskatchewan in 2006. In 2006, she played Canadian Interuniversity Sport (CIS) soccer at the university, making 14 appearances and scoring three goals with three assists. After only a year with the team, she was invited to play for the Canada national team and was offered a contract to play professionally in Sweden.

== Playing career ==
=== Club ===
==== Vancouver Whitecaps ====
Kyle played a total of six seasons with the Vancouver Whitecaps from 2006 to 2012, not including 2009. During her inaugural W-League season in 2006, Kyle made one appearance for the Whitecaps for a total of 78 minutes. In 2007, she made eight appearances in her second season for the Whitecaps scoring one goal. During the 2008 season, Kyle made six appearances for the blue and white with two assists. In 2010, her fourth season with the Whitecaps, Kyle made five appearances tallying two assists. She had two playoff appearances for the team contributing one goal and one assist as the Whitecaps fell in the Championship final. In 2011, Kyle made three playoff appearances for the Whitecaps. She scored two goals during those appearances including the game-winning goal against arch-rival Seattle to help the team clinch third place.

==== Piteå IF ====
In 2009, Kyle played with the Piteå IF in Sweden's top-flight women's league, Damallsvenskan. She made 13 appearances for the team, scoring one goal.

==== Seattle Reign FC ====
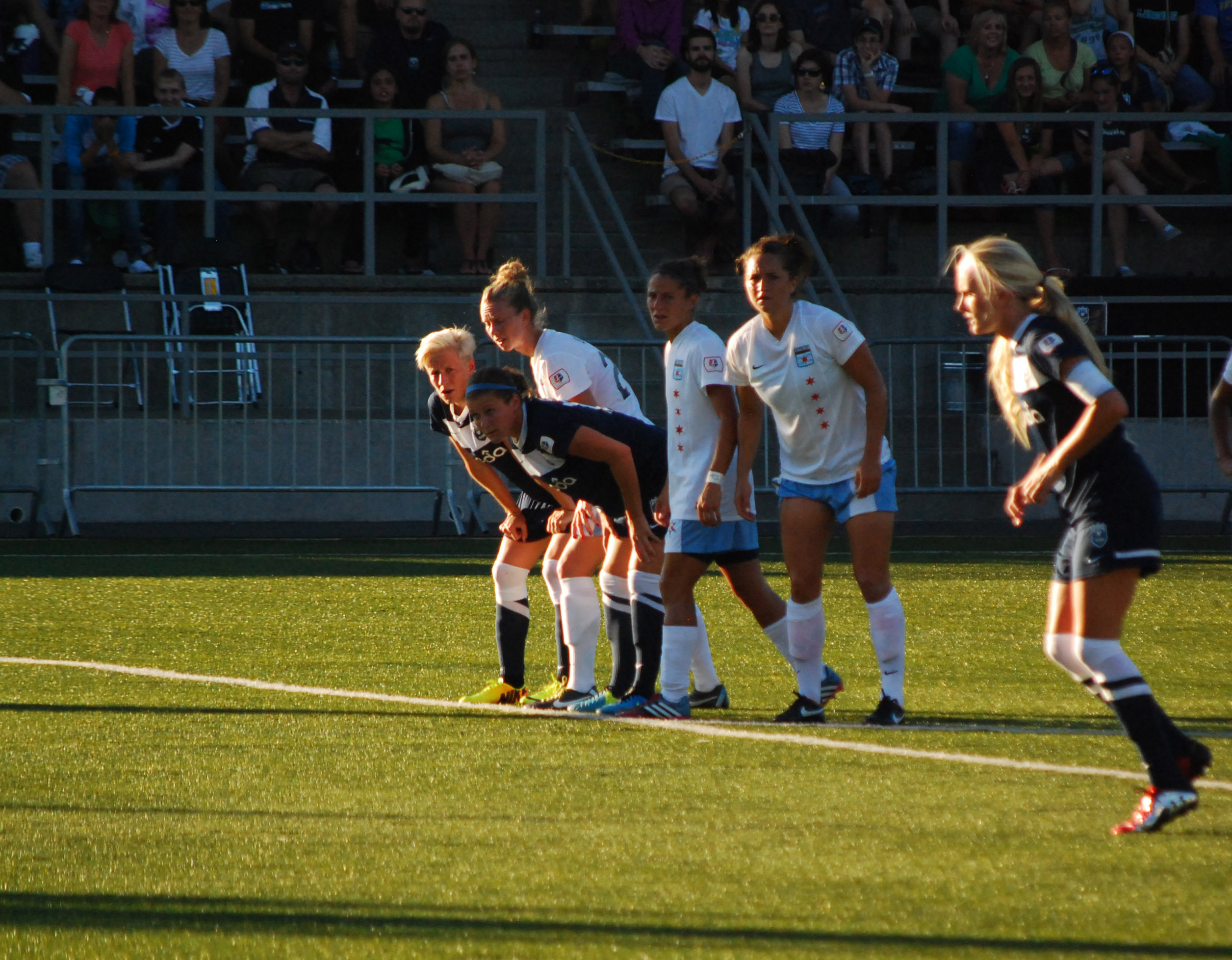
Kyle scores a penalty kick against the Chicago Red Stars on July 25, 2013 at Starfire Stadium in Tukwila, Washington.

On January 11, 2013, as part of the NWSL Player Allocation, Kyle joined the Seattle Reign FC in the National Women's Soccer League (NWSL). After playing a few games as a midfielder, Kyle shifted to a centre back position and helped strengthen a young defensive line. As a defender, Kyle was a leading scorer for the Reign scoring three goals on the season, all of them penalty kicks. Kyle made 21 appearances for the squad, starting in nineteen matches and tallying 1,752 minutes played.

==== Boston Breakers ====
On September 10, 2013, Seattle traded her to the Boston Breakers for fellow Canadian Carmelina Moscato.

==== Houston Dash ====
On April 29, 2014, Kyle was traded to the Houston Dash for Nikki Washington.

==== Portland Thorns ====
Kyle played 12 games for Portland in 2015.

==== Orlando Pride ====
On October 26, 2015, Kyle was acquired by the Orlando Pride along with Alex Morgan from Portland Thorns FC. In return, Portland received Orlando's rights to their first expansion draft selection. She made 17 appearances for the Pride before being released prior to the start of the 2017 season.

=== International ===
Kyle has represented Canada on the U-17 and U-20 youth teams. She participated at the FIFA U-20 Women's World Cup twice in 2006 and 2008.

In 2008, she won her first cap for the senior team in a 4–0 loss to the United States. At the 2011 Pan American Games, she was a member of the gold-winning team that defeated Brazil.

Kyle won bronze at the London 2012 Olympic Games, playing a prominent role throughout the tournament in Canada's midfield. Canada defeated France 1–0 in the bronze medal game on August 9, 2012.

She won her 100th cap with the senior national team at the 2015 FIFA Women's World Cup, during the round of 16 match against Switzerland.

Kyle announced her retirement from international competition via social media on April 21, 2017.

== International goals ==
No.	Date	Venue	Opponent	Score	Result	Competition
1.	15 May 2011	Rome, Italy	Switzerland	1–1	1–1	Friendly
2.	14 June 2011	Rome, Italy	North Korea	1–0	2–0	Friendly
3.	25 October 2011	Guadalajara, Mexico	Colombia	1–0	2–1	2011 Pan American Games
4.	23 January 2012	Vancouver, Canada	Costa Rica	3–0	5–1	2012 CONCACAF Women's Olympic Qualifying Tournament
5.	4 April 2013	Nice, France	France	1–1	1–1	Friendly
6.	7 March 2014	Larnaca, Cyprus	Italy	3–0	3–1	2014 Cyprus Women's Cup

== Post-soccer career ==
Kyle became a broadcaster for TSN in 2017. She hit the headlines in June 2019 when she stated that Canada's rivals the US should not have celebrated whilst scoring the last few of their goals during the 13–0 defeat of Thailand during the Women's World Cup of that year. Kyle hosts for BeIN Sports regularly. She also serves as an analyst for broadcasts on the network. In 2020, she was announced to be the sideline reporter for Inter Miami CF.

Kyle joined the Apple TV MLS Season Pass broadcasting team for the 2023 season. She announced on August 12, 2026 that she was leaving Apple TV and MLS.

Kyle announced on December 21, 2023 that she had become a brand ambassador for Can-i Wellness oral spray supplements.

== Personal life ==
She married Harrison Heath in 2017. They welcomed their first child in June 2018, Hayden Jack Heath.

== See also ==
- List of Olympic medalists in football
- List of women's footballers with 100 or more international caps
- List of 2012 Summer Olympics medal winners
- List of current Major League Soccer broadcasters
- List of Canadian sports personalities
- List of 2011 Pan American Games medalists
- List of Vancouver Whitecaps Women players
- List of OL Reign players
