= 2020 Portland Thorns FC season =

Portland Thorns FC
2020 season
- Chairman: Merritt Paulson
- Manager: Mark Parsons
- Stadium: Providence Park; Portland, Oregon
- 2020 NWSL Challenge Cup: Semi-finals
- 2020 NWSL Fall Series: Champions
- Average home league attendance: 14,391
| Home colours | Away colours |

The 2020 Portland Thorns FC season was the team's and the league's eighth season of existence. The Thorns played in the National Women's Soccer League (NWSL), the top division of women's soccer in the United States. Due to the COVID-19 pandemic, on March 12, 2020 the Thorns canceled their preseason tournament, scheduled for March 29-April 4. On March 20, 2020, the NWSL postponed the start of the league's regular season indefinitely.

== Team ==
=== Coaching staff ===
| Position | Staff |
|---|---|
| Head Coach | (England) Mark Parsons |
| Assistant Coach | Rich Gunney |
| Assistant Coach | Sophie Clough |
| Goalkeeper Coach | (Germany) Nadine Angerer |
| Fitness Coach and Performance Specialist | Tom Milroy |
| Head Athletic Trainer | Pierre Soubrier |
| Athletic Trainer | Bailey Torrez |
| Team Physician | Breanne Brown, M.D. |

Last updated: April 10, 2020

=== Current squad ===
| No. | Nat. | Name | Date of birth (age) | Since | Previous team | Notes (Note: denotes a season-ending injury.) |
Goalkeepers
| 24 | (United States) | Adrianna Franch | November 2, 1990 (aged 29) | 2016 | (Norway) Avaldsnes IL | FED |
| 31 | (United States) | Bella Bixby | November 25, 1995 (aged 24) | 2018 | (United States) Oregon State | |
| 33 | (United States) | Britt Eckerstrom | May 28, 1993 (aged 26) | 2017 | (United States) Western New York Flash | |
Defenders
| 2 | (United States) | Katherine Reynolds | September 14, 1987 (aged 32) | 2016 | (United States) Washington Spirit | |
| 4 | (United States) | Becky Sauerbrunn | June 6, 1985 (aged 34) | 2020 | (United States) Utah Royals FC | |
| 5 | (United States) | Emily Menges | July 28, 1992 (aged 27) | 2014 | (United States) Georgetown | |
| 15 | (United States) | Madison Pogarch | November 5, 1997 (aged 22) | 2019 | (United States) Rutgers | |
| 20 | (United States) | Kelli Hubly | August 9, 1994 (aged 25) | 2017 | (United States) DePaul | |
| 25 | (United States) | Meghan Klingenberg | August 2, 1988 (aged 31) | 2016 | (United States) Houston Dash | |
| 35 | (United States) | Gabby Seiler | September 14, 1994 (aged 25) | 2018 | (United States) Florida | |
| 18 | (United States) | Christen Westphal | September 2, 1993 (aged 26) | 2020 | (United States) Reign FC | |
| 39 | (United States) | Meaghan Nally | June 30, 1998 (aged 21) | 2020 | (United States) Georgetown | |
Midfielders
| 10 | (United States) | Lindsey Horan | May 26, 1994 (aged 25) | 2016 | (France) Paris Saint-Germain | FED |
| 17 | (United States) | Tobin Heath | May 29, 1988 (aged 31) | 2013 | (France) Paris Saint-Germain | FED |
| 30 | (United States) | Celeste Boureille | April 20, 1994 (aged 25) | 2016 | (United States) California Golden Bears | |
| 36 | (United States) | Angela Salem | July 24, 1988 (aged 31) | 2018 | (United States) Boston Breakers | |
| 11 | (Costa Rica) | Raquel Rodríguez | October 28, 1993 (aged 26) | 2020 | (United States) Sky Blue FC | INT |
| 37 | (United States) | Emily Ogle | August 5, 1996 (aged 23) | 2019 | (United States) Penn State | |
Forwards
| 9 | (United States) | Sophia Smith | August 10, 2000 (aged 19) | 2020 | (United States) Stanford | |
| 12 | (Canada) | Christine Sinclair | June 12, 1983 (aged 36) | 2013 | (United States) Western New York Flash | FED |
| 22 | (United States) | Morgan Weaver | October 18, 1997 (aged 22) | 2020 | (United States) Washington State | |
| 34 | (United States) | Tyler Lussi | January 26, 1995 (aged 25) | 2017 | (United States) Princeton | |
| 38 | (United States) | Simone Charley | February 4, 1995 (aged 25) | 2019 | (United States) Vanderbilt | |
| 40 | (United States) | Marissa Everett | August 29, 1997 (aged 22) | 2019 | (United States) Oregon | |

== Competitions ==
=== Challenge Cup ===
==== Preliminary round ====
| June 27 1 | North Carolina Courage | 2–1 | Portland Thorns FC | Herriman, Utah |
| 9:30 a.m. | Debinha 75'; L. Williams 90+4' | Report | Charley 80' | Stadium: Zions Bank Stadium; Referee: Lukasz Szpala |
Note: Televised on CBS

| July 1 2 | Portland Thorns FC | 0–0 | Chicago Red Stars | Herriman, Utah |
| 9:30 a.m. | Lussi (yellow card) 80' | Report | Doniak (yellow card) 49' | Stadium: Zions Bank Stadium; Referee: Danielle Chesky |

| July 5 2 | Portland Thorns FC | 1–1 | Washington Spirit | Herriman, Utah |
| 7:00 p.m. | Horan 69' | Report | Staab 77' | Stadium: Zions Bank Stadium; Referee: Karen Abt |

| July 13 4 | OL Reign | 0–0 | Portland Thorns FC | Herriman, Utah |
| 9:30 a.m. | | Report | | Stadium: Zions Bank Stadium; Referee: Tori Penso |

===== Standings =====
| Pos | Team | Pld | W | D | L | GF | GA | GD | Pts |
|---|---|---|---|---|---|---|---|---|---|
| 1 | North Carolina Courage | 4 | 4 | 0 | 0 | 7 | 1 | +6 | 12 |
| 2 | Washington Spirit | 4 | 2 | 1 | 1 | 4 | 4 | 0 | 7 |
| 3 | OL Reign | 4 | 1 | 2 | 1 | 1 | 2 | −1 | 5 |
| 4 | Houston Dash | 4 | 1 | 1 | 2 | 5 | 6 | −1 | 4 |
| 5 | Utah Royals FC (H) | 4 | 1 | 1 | 2 | 4 | 5 | −1 | 4 |
| 6 | Chicago Red Stars | 4 | 1 | 1 | 2 | 2 | 3 | −1 | 4 (Note: Chicago Red Stars won the tiebreaker against Sky Blue FC on fewer yellow cards (1 to 4).) |
| 7 | Sky Blue FC | 4 | 1 | 1 | 2 | 2 | 3 | −1 | 4 |
| 8 | Portland Thorns FC | 4 | 0 | 3 | 1 | 2 | 3 | −1 | 3 |

Source: NWSL
Rules for classification: Tiebreakers
(H) Host

==== Knockout round ====
| July 17 QF | North Carolina Courage | 0–1 | Portland Thorns FC | Herriman, Utah |
| 9:30 a.m. | Debinha (yellow card) 52'; O'Sullivan (yellow card) 90+4' | Report | Weaver 68' | Stadium: Zions Bank Stadium; Referee: Lukasz Szpala |

| July 22 SF | Houston Dash | 1–0 | Portland Thorns FC | Sandy, Utah |
| 9:30 a.m. | Daly 69' (yellow card) 90' | Report | | Stadium: Rio Tinto Stadium; Referee: Tori Penso |

=== 2020 Fall Series ===
| September 20 1 | Portland Thorns FC | 3–0 | Utah Royals FC | Portland, Oregon |
| 12:00 p.m. | Charley 35'; Smith 72'; Horan 81'; Pogarch (yellow card) 88'; Klingenberg (yellow card) 90+5' | Report | | Stadium: Providence Park; Attendance: Closed; Referee: Adorae Monroy |

| September 30 2 | Portland Thorns FC | 4–1 | OL Reign | Portland, Oregon |
| 7:00 p.m. | Klingenberg (yellow card) 35'; Sinclair 40' 45+5' (pen.) 74'; Rodríguez 57' | Report | Balcer 70' | Stadium: Providence Park; Attendance: Closed; Referee: Farhad Dadkho |

| October 3 3 | Utah Royals FC | 1–1 | Portland Thorns FC | Sandy, Utah |
| 7:00 p.m. | Rodriguez 9' | Report | Sinclair 59' | Stadium: Rio Tinto Stadium; Attendance: Closed; Referee: Karen Abt |

| October 10 4 | OL Reign | 1–2 | Portland Thorns FC | Tacoma, Washington |
| 5 p.m. PDT | Brooks 46' | Report | Sinclair 43' (pen.) 73' (pen.) | Stadium: Cheney Stadium; Attendance: Closed; Referee: Laura Rodriguez |

==== Standings ====
| Pos | Team | Pld | W | D | L | GF | GA | GD | Pts | Qualification |
|---|---|---|---|---|---|---|---|---|---|---|
| 1 | Portland Thorns FC (C) | 4 | 3 | 1 | 0 | 10 | 3 | +7 | 10 | Community Shield |
| 2 | Houston Dash | 4 | 3 | 0 | 1 | 12 | 7 | +5 | 9 | Runners-up |
| 3 | Washington Spirit | 4 | 2 | 1 | 1 | 5 | 4 | +1 | 7 | Third place |
| 4 | Sky Blue FC | 4 | 2 | 0 | 2 | 6 | 7 | −1 | 6 | |
| 5 | North Carolina Courage | 4 | 1 | 2 | 1 | 8 | 10 | −2 | 5 | |
| 6 | Chicago Red Stars | 4 | 1 | 1 | 2 | 7 | 7 | 0 | 4 | |
| 7 | OL Reign | 4 | 1 | 1 | 2 | 6 | 8 | −2 | 4 | |
| 8 | Orlando Pride | 4 | 0 | 2 | 2 | 5 | 8 | −3 | 2 | |
| 9 | Utah Royals FC | 4 | 0 | 2 | 2 | 3 | 8 | −5 | 2 | |

Source: NWSL
Rules for classification: Tiebreakers
(C) Champions

== Transactions ==
=== NWSL Draft ===
Draft picks are not automatically signed to the team roster. The 2020 NWSL College Draft was held on January 16, 2020.

| R | Pick | Nat. | Player | Pos. | College | Status | Ref. |
|---|---|---|---|---|---|---|---|
| 1 | 1 | (United States) | Sophia Smith | FW | Stanford | Allocated by the United States Soccer Federation in 2021. | |
| 1 | 2 | (United States) | Morgan Weaver | FW | Washington State | Signed to two-year contract with one-year option. | |
| 3 | 25 | (United States) | Meaghan Nally | DF | Georgetown | Signed to two-year contract with one-year option. | |

=== Transfers out ===
| Date | Nat. | Player | Pos. | Destination club | Fee/notes | Ref. |
|---|---|---|---|---|---|---|
| August 21, 2020 | (United States) | Celeste Boureille | MF | (France) FC Fleury 91 | Short-term loan. | |
| September 9, 2020 | (United States) | Tobin Heath | MF/FW | (England) Manchester United W.F.C. | Out of contract; Thorns retained NWSL playing rights. | |
| December 16, 2020 | (United States) | Emily Ogle | MF | (United States) Houston Dash | Traded for the 7th- and 37th-overall picks in the 2021 NWSL Draft. | |
| December 16, 2020 | (United States) | Gabby Seiler | MF | (United States) Houston Dash | Traded for the 7th- and 37th-overall picks in the 2021 NWSL Draft. | |
| January 19, 2021 | (United States) | Britt Eckerstrom | GK | None | Retired. | |

=== Expansion Draft ===
The 2020 NWSL Expansion Draft was a special draft held on November 12, 2020, by the National Women's Soccer League (NWSL) for Racing Louisville FC, an expansion team, to select players from existing teams in the league. The league allowed Louisville to select up to 18 players from lists of unprotected players provided by the existing nine NWSL teams.

==== Protected players ====
Racing Louisville FC selected the playing rights of Tobin Heath, which the Thorns retained while she was playing for Manchester United W.F.C. in the Women's Super League.

| Protected | Unprotected |
|---|---|
| Simone Charley | Nadine Angerer |
| Crystal Dunn | Bella Bixby |
| Lindsey Horan | Celeste Boureille |
| Kelli Hubly | Marian Dougherty |
| Meghan Klingenberg | Britt Eckerstrom |
| Natalia Kuikka | Marissa Everett |
| Emily Menges | Adrianna Franch |
| Raquel Rodríguez | **Tobin Heath** |
| Christine Sinclair | Tyler Lussi |
| Sophia Smith | Andressinha |
| Morgan Weaver | Nikki Marshall |
| | Meg Morris |
| | Meaghan Nally |
| | Emily Ogle |
| | Madison Pogarch |
| | Hayley Raso |
| | Kat Reynolds |
| | Angela Salem |
| | Becky Sauerbrunn |
| | Gabby Seiler |
| | Kat Tarr |
| | Rachel Van Hollebeke |
| | Christen Westphal |
| | Sandra Yu |

- **Bold** indicates players selected in the Expansion Draft
- Blue highlights indicate United States federation players
- Italics indicate players who are not under contract but whose NWSL playing rights remain with the team

== See also ==
- 2020 National Women's Soccer League season
- 2020 in American soccer
