= 2017 Portland Thorns FC season =

Portland Thorns FC
2017 season
- President: Merritt Paulson
- Head coach: Mark Parsons
- Stadium: Providence Park; Portland, Oregon (Capacity: 21,144)
- National Women's Soccer League: 2nd
- NWSL Playoffs: Champions
- Top goalscorer: Christine Sinclair (8 goals)
- Highest home attendance: 21,444 (September 30 vs. Chicago Red Stars)
- Lowest home attendance: 14,471 (April 29 vs. Chicago Red Stars)
- Average home league attendance: 17,653
- Biggest win: 4–0 (September 2 vs. Washington Spirit)
- Biggest defeat: 1–3 (June 17 vs. Sky Blue FC)
Home colors	Away colors
- All statistics correct as of July 8, 2017.

The 2017 Portland Thorns FC season was the team's and the league's fifth season of existence. The Thorns played in the National Women's Soccer League (NWSL), the top division of women's soccer in the United States. The Thorns had finished in first place in the 2016 season, but failed to advance from the semifinals in the 2016 NWSL playoffs. With a slogan of "Unfinished Business", they qualified for the NWSL playoffs as the 2nd ranked team in the 2017 regular season. In the playoffs, they defeated the Orlando Pride and then the North Carolina Courage to become 2017 NWSL Champions. It was their second championship, following the first in 2013.

This page covers from the day after the 2016 NWSL final to the day of the 2017 NWSL final.

== Season review ==
=== Off-season ===
On October 17, 2016, defender Kat Williamson announced her retirement from soccer.

On October 19, 2016, Portland Thorns FC exercised contract options on goalkeeper Adrianna Franch; defenders Meg Morris and Katherine Reynolds; midfielders Celeste Boureille, Dagný Brynjarsdóttir, Amandine Henry, and Kendall Johnson; and forwards Nadia Nadim, Hayley Raso, and Mallory Weber. Goalkeeper Michelle Betos, defender Emily Menges, and midfielder Meleana Shim went out of contract and were extended new contract offers. Michelle Betos would later confirm on her Twitter account that she did not accept the offer, while Menges and Shim did.

On October 27, 2016, Tobin Heath, Lindsey Horan, Allie Long, Meghan Klingenberg and goalkeeper Adrianna Franch were called up for USA for two friendly matches against Romania.

On November 2, 2016, Emily Menges received her first USA call up due to Meghan Klingenberg suffering from a back injury.

On November 8, 2016, Portland Thorns FC head coach Mark Parsons signed a long-term contract extension. Director of goalkeeping Nadine Angerer also signed a contract extension.

On December 13, 2016, Tobin Heath was named U.S. Soccer Female Player of the Year.

On December 15, 2016, Christine Sinclair was named Canadian Player of the Year.

On January 4, 2017, Tobin Heath, Lindsey Horan and Allie Long, Emily Sonnett and goalkeeper Adrianna Franch were called up by USA for an evaluation period for the upcoming SheBelieves Cup.

On January 12, 2017, Portland Thorns FC selected midfielders Rachel Hill and Caroline Flynn and forwards Savannah Jordan and Tyler Lussi from the 2017 NWSL College Draft.

On January 18, 2017, Portland Thorns FC acquired Orlando Pride's first-round and fourth-round 2018 NWSL College Draft picks for the rights to forward Rachel Hill, who was chosen by Portland in the 2017 NWSL College Draft.

On January 27, 2017, Amandine Henry was sent on a short-term loan to French side Paris Saint-Germain.

On February 8, 2017, Tobin Heath, Lindsey Horan and Allie Long, and defenders Meghan Klingenberg and Emily Sonnett were called up to the USA training camp ahead of the SheBelieves Cup.

On February 22, 2017, Portland Thorns FC re-signed defender Emily Menges and midfielder Meleana Shim.

On March 8, 2017, Portland Thorns FC traded two fourth round picks in the 2018 NWSL College Draft to the North Carolina Courage for goalkeeper Britt Eckerstrom.

=== Preseason ===
On March 13, 2017, Portland Thorns FC announced their 2017 preseason roster, which included 5 non-roster invites.

On March 26, 2017, Portland Thorns FC began their preseason tournament against the Chicago Red Stars. There would be no cards and a single goal from Nadia Nadim in the 26th minute from a converted penalty. Portland would go on to win their first preseason match 1–0.

On April 14, 2017, the Thorns signed defender Meghan Cox, who was an undrafted non-roster invitee to preseason camp.

=== April ===
On April 15, 2017, Portland Thorns FC hosted the Orlando Pride for the start of the 2017 NWSL campaign. In the 32nd minute, Nadia Nadim successfully converted a penalty kick after an Orlando handball in the box. In the 67th minute, Allie Long sent a cross to Christine Sinclair, who scored to put the Thorns up another goal. After the 2–0 win, they were tied for first place with Houston Dash and FC Kansas City.

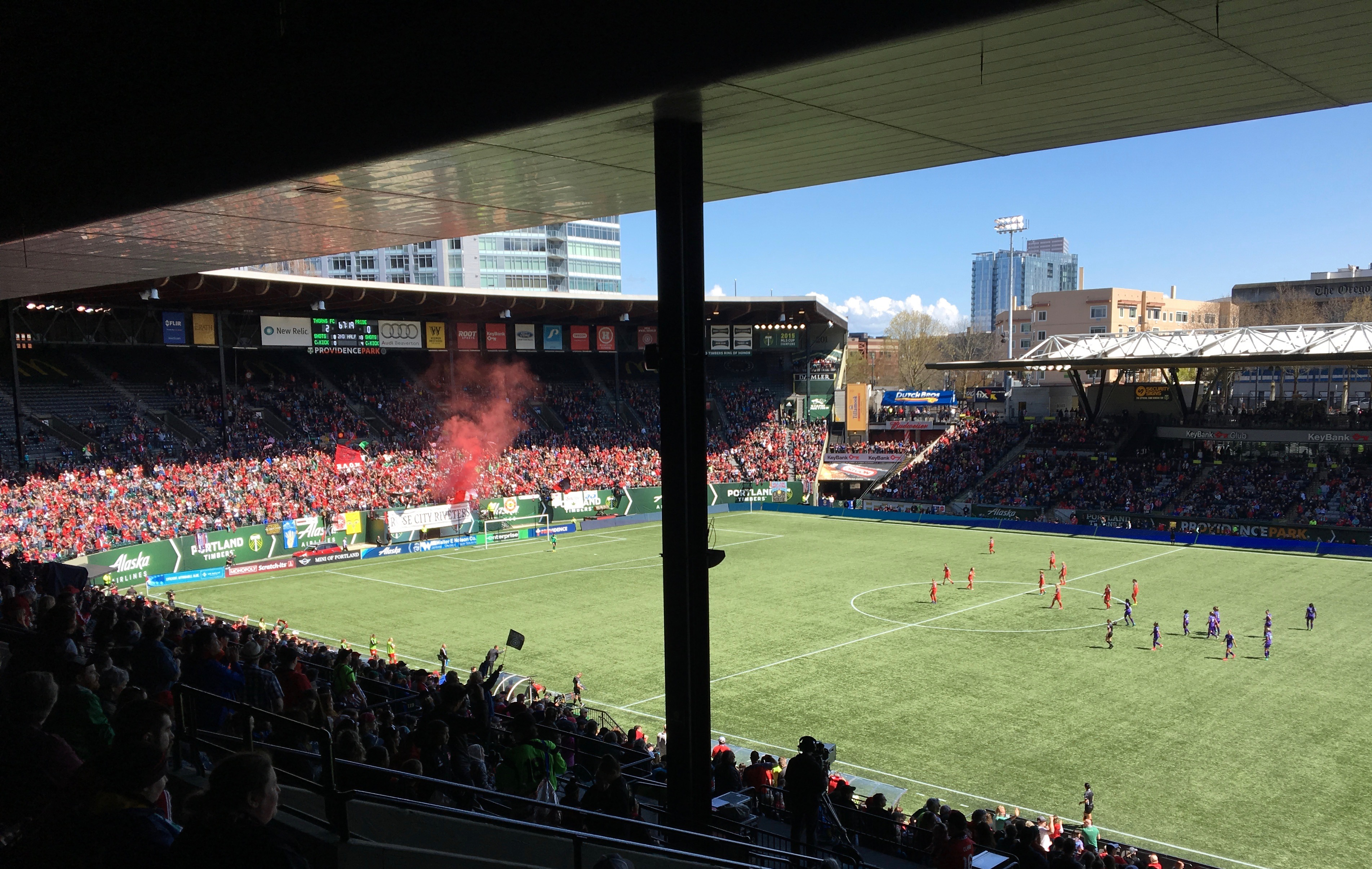
Vs. Orlando Pride on April 15, 2017

On April 22, 2017, Portland Thorns FC went on the road for the first time to take on the North Carolina Courage, formerly the Western New York Flash, relocated and rebranded in the offseason. North Carolina won 1–0 on a late goal from Debinha in the 81st minute.

On April 29, 2017, the Thorns returned home to defeat the Chicago Red Stars 1–0 on a Nadia Nadim penalty kick after a Christen Press handball in the box.

Position at the end of April

Pos	Team	Pld	W	D	L	GF	GA	GD	Pts
3	Portland Thorns FC	3	2	0	1	3	1	+2	6

=== May ===
Thorns FC opened May by hosting their rivals Seattle Reign FC. In the 1st minute, Seattle's Jess Fishlock scored a long-range shot from 24 yards out. In the 37th minute, Fishlock scored again but instead this time in Seattle's own net, equalizing Portland 1–1. Shortly after in the 29th minute, Merritt Mathias, with an assist from Rebekah Stott, put Seattle back up, 2–1, at the end of the first half. Portland equalized again with a goal from Allie Long, assisted by Meghan Klingenberg, in the 82nd minute. Both teams settled with a point from a final score of 2–2.

Position as of May 6

Pos	Team	Pld	W	D	L	GF	GA	GD	Pts
2	Portland Thorns FC	4	2	1	1	5	3	+2	7

== Competitions ==
Competition	Record								Started round	First match	Last match	Final position
Competition	G	W	D	L	GF	GA	GD	Win %				
NWSL	24	14	5	5	37	20	+17	58.33	1	April 15, 2017	September 30, 2017	Second place
NWSL Playoffs	2	2	0	0	5	1	+4	100.00	1	October 7, 2017	October 14, 2017	Winners
Total	26	16	5	5	42	21	+21	61.54				

Updated to match played Jan. 15, 2018
Source: Competitions

=== NWSL ===
==== Preseason ====
Providence Park Preseason Tournament
Win Draw Loss Upcoming fixture

March 26, 2017 1	Portland Thorns FC	1–0	Chicago Red Stars	Portland, Oregon
17:00 (PST)	Nadim 26' (pen.)	Report		Stadium: Providence Park; Attendance: 6,802

March 29, 2017 2	Portland Thorns FC	1–2	U.S. U-23s WNT	Portland, Oregon
19:30 (PST)	Weber	Report	Xiao 66'; Smith 90'	Stadium: Providence Park; Attendance: 6,129

April 1, 2017 3	Portland Thorns FC	1–1	Houston Dash	Portland, Oregon
19:30 (PST)	Shim 17'; Nadim (yellow card) 43'	Report	Daly (yellow card) 28', (goal) 76'	Stadium: Providence Park; Attendance: 7,252

Pos	Team	Pld	W	L	D	GF	GA	GD	Pts
1	(United States) Houston Dash (C)	3	1	1	1	4	4	0	4
2	(United States) Portland Thorns FC	3	1	1	1	3	3	0	4
2	(United States) U.S. U-23s WNT	3	1	1	1	3	3	0	4
3	(United States) Chicago Red Stars	3	1	1	1	2	2	0	4

(C) Champions

==== Regular season ====
===== League table =====
Pos	Team	Pld	W	D	L	GF	GA	GD	Pts	Qualification
1	North Carolina Courage	24	16	1	7	38	22	+16	49	NWSL Shield
2	Portland Thorns FC (C)	24	14	5	5	37	20	+17	47	NWSL Playoffs
3	Orlando Pride	24	11	7	6	45	31	+14	40	NWSL Playoffs
4	Chicago Red Stars	24	11	6	7	33	30	+3	39	NWSL Playoffs
5	Seattle Reign FC	24	9	7	8	43	37	+6	34	
6	Sky Blue FC	24	10	3	11	42	51	−9	33	
7	FC Kansas City	24	8	7	9	29	31	−2	31	
8	Houston Dash	24	7	3	14	23	39	−16	24	
9	Boston Breakers	24	4	7	13	24	35	−11	19	
10	Washington Spirit	24	5	4	15	30	48	−18	19	

Source: NWSL
Rules for classification: Tiebreakers
(C) Champions

===== Matches =====
Win Draw Loss Upcoming fixture

Date Round	Home team	Score	Away team	Location
Time				Stadium: Stadium; Attendance: Attendance; Referee: Referee

April 15, 2017 1	Portland Thorns FC	2–0	Orlando Pride	Portland, Oregon
12:00 (PST)	Nadim 32' (pen.); Sinclair 67' (Long)	Report		Stadium: Providence Park; Attendance: 16,145; Referee: Danielle Chesky

April 23, 2016 2	North Carolina Courage	1–0	Portland Thorns FC	Cary, North Carolina
16:30 (PST)	Kawamura (yellow card) 27'; Mewis (yellow card) 76'; Debinha 81' (McDonald)	Report		Stadium: WakeMed Soccer Park; Attendance: 6,298; Referee: Victor Rivas

April 29, 2017 3	Portland Thorns FC	1–0	Chicago Red Stars	Portland, Oregon
13:00 (PST)	Nadim 27' (pen.); Sonnett (yellow card) 51'; Boureille (yellow card) 67'	Report	Ertz (yellow card) 64'; Press (yellow card) 90+1'	Stadium: Providence Park; Attendance: 14,471; Referee: Ramy Touchan

May 6, 2017 4	Portland Thorns FC	2–2	Seattle Reign FC	Portland, Oregon
19:00 (PST)	Fishlock 37' (o.g.); Henry (yellow card) 73'; Long 82' (Klingenberg); Horan (yellow card) 90+1'	Report	Fishlock 1' (Utsugi); Mathias 39' (Stott); Rapinoe (yellow card) 57'; Fishlock (yellow card) 66'	Stadium: Providence Park; Attendance: 16,160; Referee: Christina Unkel

May 13, 2017 5	FC Kansas City	0–0	Portland Thorns FC	Kansas City, Missouri
19:00 (PST)	Moros (yellow card) 74'	Report		Stadium: Swope Soccer Village; Attendance: 1,796; Referee: Karen Abt

May 19, 2017 6	Boston Breakers	2–2	Portland Thorns	Boston, Massachusetts
16:00 (PST)	Dowie 38' (Leon); White 48' (Dowie); Salem (yellow card) 90'	Report	Nadim 57' (pen.); Weber (yellow card) 65'; Cox (yellow card) 68'; Nadim 83' (Raso)	Stadium: Jordan Field; Attendance: 3,321; Referee: Farhad Dadkho

May 27, 2017 7	Portland Thorns FC	2–0	Boston Breakers	Portland, Oregon
19:00 (PST)	King 1' (o.g.); Henry 5'; Nadim (yellow card) 49'	Report	Haavi (yellow card) 24'; Westphal (yellow card) 71'; Chapman (red card) 90+1'	Stadium: Providence Park; Attendance: 18,637; Referee: Katja Koroleva

June 3, 2017 8	Sky Blue FC	0–2	Portland Thorns FC	Piscataway, New Jersey
16:00 (PST)	Mills (yellow card) 20'; O'Hara (yellow card) 89'	Report	Horan 20' (Nadim), 42' (Klingenberg), (yellow card) 59'; Cox (yellow card) 77'	Stadium: Yurcak Field; Attendance: 2,418; Referee: Marco Vega; Assistant referees: Amanda Ross, Tom Felice; Fourth official: Lorant Varga

June 17, 2017 9	Portland Thorns FC	1–3	Sky Blue FC	Portland, Oregon
19:00 (PST)	Henry (yellow card) 90+1'; Sinclair 90+5' (penalty)	Report	Rodriguez 1' (Kerr); O'Hara (yellow card) 74'; Kerr 70' (Hayes), 88' (Tiernan); Stanton (yellow card) 90'	Stadium: Providence Park; Attendance: 16,736; Referee: Timothy Ford; Assistant referees: Deleana Quan, JJ Blodgett; Fourth official: Cephas Quartson

June 24, 2017 10	Washington Spirit	1–0	Portland Thorns FC	Boyds, Maryland
16:00 (PST)	Ordega 19'	Report		Stadium: Maryland SoccerPlex; Attendance: 4,319; Referee: Danielle Chesky; Assistant referees: Cory Richardson, Jeffrey Skinker; Fourth official: Jorge Ramirez

June 28, 2017 11	Portland Thorns FC	3–0	FC Kansas City	Portland, Oregon
19:00 (PST)	Sinclair 15', 75' (Raso), (yellow card) 71'; Raso 32' (Horan), (yellow card) 66'; Horan (yellow card) 52'	Report	Newfield (yellow card) 54'; Ratcliffe (yellow card) 83'; Kelly (yellow card) 90+2'	Stadium: Providence Park; Attendance: 16,199; Referee: Chipalo Street; Assistant referees: Adrienne McDonald, Cephas Quartson; Fourth official: Kelsey Harms

July 1, 2017 12	Seattle Reign FC	2–0	Portland Thorns FC	Seattle, Washington
19:00 (PST)	Rapinoe 45+1', 81' (Nairn); McNabb (yellow card) 77'	Report	Sinclair (yellow card) 64'; Brynjarsdottir (yellow card) 72'; Raso (yellow card) 90+1'	Stadium: Memorial Stadium; Attendance: 4,270; Referee: Jon Freemon; Assistant referees: Joshua Haimes, TJ Zablocki; Fourth official: Cephas Quartson

July 8, 2017 13	Houston Dash	1–1	Portland Thorns FC	Houston, Texas
19:00 (PST)	Beckie 8' (Daly); Benites (yellow card) 82'; Daly (yellow card) 90'; Lloyd (red card) 90+1'	Report	Horan (yellow card) 45+2', (goal) 90+1'	Stadium: BBVA Compass Stadium; Attendance: 3,869; Referee: Christina Unkel; Assistant referees: Deleana Quan, Brooke Mayo; Fourth official: Estefania Estrada
Note: Kickoff was delayed from 17:30 Pacific due to severe weather.

July 15, 2017 14	Portland Thorns FC	1–0	North Carolina Courage	Portland, Oregon
12:50 (PST)	Raso (yellow card) 62', (goal) 70' (Klingenberg)	Report	Smith (yellow card) 58'	Stadium: Providence Park; Attendance: 16,804; Referee: Katja Koroleva

July 22, 2017 15	Portland Thorns FC	2–1	Washington Spirit	Portland, Oregon
19:00 (PST)	Long 62' (Lussi); Weber 80' (Sykes); Sykes (yellow card) 30'	Report	Solaun 58'; Ship (yellow card) 12'	Stadium: Providence Park; Attendance: 18,478; Referee: Michael Radchuk

August 5, 2017 16	Portland Thorns FC	2–1	Houston Dash	Portland, Oregon
12:50 (PST)	Sonnett 12'; Lussi 39'	Report	Heap (yellow card) 22'; Lloyd 33' (pen.) (yellow card) 40'	Stadium: Providence Park; Attendance: 18,243; Referee: Karen Abt

August 12, 2017 17	Chicago Red Stars	2–3	Portland Thorns FC	Bridgeview, Illinois
19:00 (PST)	Press 16'; Huerta 38'; Gilliland (yellow card) 54'	Report	Raso 3'; Sinclair 9'; Sonnett 55'	Stadium: Toyota Park; Attendance: 4,934; Referee: Greg Dopka

August 16, 2017 18	FC Kansas City	2–1	Portland Thorns FC	Kansas City, Missouri
19:00 (PST)	Averbuch 65'; Leroux 69'	Report	Henry 44' (pen.)	Stadium: Swope Soccer Village; Attendance: 428; Referee: Marco Vega

August 19, 2017 19	Portland Thorns FC	2–0	Houston Dash	Portland, Oregon
19:00 (PST)	Horan 14'; Brynjarsdóttir (yellow card) 32'; Henry 48'; Sinclair (yellow card) 70'; Sonnett (yellow card) 79'	Report	Beckie (yellow card) 60'; Daly (yellow card) 73' (yellow-red card) 79'; Roccaro (yellow card) 74'; Levin (yellow card) 76'	Stadium: Providence Park; Attendance: 19,672; Referee: Christina Unkel

August 26, 2017 20	Seattle Reign FC	1–2	Portland Thorns FC	Seattle, Washington
13:00 (PST)	McNabb (yellow card) 60'; Barnes (yellow card) 68'; Fishlock 90' (pen.)	Summary	Raso 49' 85' (yellow card) 90+3'; Brynjarsdóttir (yellow card) 77'; Klingenberg (yellow card) 90'	Stadium: Memorial Stadium; Attendance: 6,041; Referee: Farhad Dadkho

September 2, 2017 21	Portland Thorns FC	4–0	Washington Spirit	Portland, Oregon
13:00 (PST)	Nadim 22'; Sinclair 25' (Nadim), 81' (Sonnett); Reynolds (yellow card) 36'; Sonnett 40' (Klingenberg)	Report	Haracic (yellow card) 21'	Stadium: Providence Park; Attendance: 19,141; Referee: Katja Koroleva

September 10, 2017 22	Boston Breakers	0–1	Portland Thorns FC	Boston, Massachusetts
15:00 (PST)	Oyster (yellow card) 82'	Report	Sinclair 72' (Raso)	Stadium: Jordan Field; Attendance: 3015; Referee: Danielle Chesky

September 23, 2017 23	Orlando Pride	0–0	Portland Thorns FC	Orlando, Florida
12:50 (PST)		Report		Stadium: Orlando City Stadium; Attendance: 7353; Referee: Chris Spivey

September 30, 2017 24	Portland Thorns FC	3–1	Chicago Red Stars	Portland, Oregon
12:50 (PDT)	Raso 2'; Sykes 13'; Nadim 83' (pen.)	Report	Huerta 71'	Stadium: Providence Park; Attendance: 21,144; Referee: Elvis Osmanovic

October 7, 2017 Playoff	Portland Thorns FC	4–1	Orlando Pride	Portland, Oregon
12:30 (PDT)	Henry 12' (yellow card) 36'; Sonnett 14'; Raso 71'; Sinclair 83'	Report	Alanna Kennedy 23'	Stadium: Providence Park; Attendance: 18,193; Referee: Timothy Ford

October 14, 2017 Final	North Carolina Courage	0–1	Portland Thorns FC	Orlando, Florida
16:30 (EDT)		Report	Heath (yellow card) 41'; Raso (yellow card) 45+1'; Horan 49'; Brynjarsdottir (yellow card) 72'	Stadium: Orlando City Stadium; Attendance: 8,124; Referee: Danielle Chesky

The 2017 NWSL Regular Season schedule was released on March 1, 2017. On June 12, the league changed kickoff times for several matches to accommodate hydration breaks during television broadcasts and implemented new guidelines for playing in extreme heat, and also allowed teams to reschedule backup games for television to later kickoff times.

===== Results by round =====
Matchday	1	2	3	4	5	6	7	8	9	10	11	12	13	14	15	16	17	18	19	20	21	22	23	24
Stadium	H	A	H	H	A	A	H	A	H	A	H	A	A	H	H	H	A	A	H	A	H	A	A	H
Result	W	L	W	D	D	D	W	W	L	L	W	L	D	W	W	W	W	L	W	W	W	W	D	W
Position (Note: Position is based on where the Portland Thorns FC are at the end of that match week, not after the match itself.)	3	6	3	2	3	5	5	3	4	4	3	5	5	4	2	2	2	2	2	2	2	2	2	2

Updated to match(es) played on September 29, 2017. Source: Schedule
A = Away; H = Home; W = Win; D = Draw; L = Loss

===== Home/away results =====
Overall								Home						Away					
Pld	W	D	L	GF	GA	GD	Pts	W	D	L	GF	GA	GD	W	D	L	GF	GA	GD
24	14	5	5	37	20	+17	47	10	1	1	25	8	+17	4	4	4	12	12	0

Last updated: September 29, 2017.
Source: Match reports

=== NWSL Playoffs ===
Win Draw Loss Upcoming fixture

Semifinal:

October 7, 2017 1	Portland Thorns FC	4–1	Orlando Pride	Portland, Oregon
12:00 (PDT)	Henry 12'; Sonnett 15'; Raso 71'; Sinclair 83'	Report	Kennedy 23'	Stadium: Providence Park; Attendance: 18,193; Referee: Timothy Ford

Final:

October 14, 2017 2	North Carolina Courage	0–1	Portland Thorns FC	Orlando, Florida
13:00 (PST)		Report	Horan 50'	Stadium: Orlando City Stadium; Attendance: 8,124; Referee: Danielle Chesky

Following the win in the Final, the Thorns were crowned 2017 NWSL Champions.

== Club ==
=== Executive staff ===
Owner and Chief Executive Officer	Merritt Paulson
President of Business	Mike Golub
General Manager/President of Soccer	Gavin Wilkinson

Updated to match played October 2, 2017
Source: Portland Timbers

=== Coaching staff ===
Position	Staff
Head Coach	Mark Parsons
Assistant Coach	Rich Gunney
Assistant Coach/Equipment Manager	Sophie Clough
Assistant Coach/Community Youth Development Coach	Carly Copplestone
Goalkeeper Coach	Nadine Angerer
Fitness Coach	Garga Caserta
Head Athletic Trainer	Beckie Kruse

Last updated: October 2, 2017
Source: Portland Timbers

=== Stadiums ===
Ground (capacity and dimensions)	Providence Park (21,144 / 110x75 yards)
Training Ground	Providence Park

Source: Providence Park

== Kits ==
=== Primary kit ===
The Thorns primarily wear red Nike Vapor match kit with gray shoulders, red shorts, and red socks. Providence Health & Services remains their kit sponsor as in past seasons. The Lifetime logo is printed in a white circle on the right sleeve, and the league logo is printed on the left sleeve. A 5th-anniversary logo is printed above the shirt's lower-left hemline.

=== Secondary kit ===
The Thorns' alternate kit are white Nike Laser shirts with black sleeve cuffs, white shorts, and white socks. This is unchanged from 2016, with the exception of the Lifetime logo printed in a red circle on the right sleeve and the 5th-anniversary logo.

== Squad information ==
=== First team squad ===
Last updated: September 2, 2017

No.	Name	Nationality	Positions	Date of birth (age)	Signed from	Year with club (year signed)
Goalkeepers
24	Adrianna Franch	(United States)	GK	November 12, 1990 (age 36)	(Norway) Avaldsnes IL	2 (2016)
33	Britt Eckerstrom	(United States)	GK	May 28, 1993 (age 33)	(United States) North Carolina Courage	1 (2017)
Defenders
2	Katherine Reynolds	(United States)	RB	September 14, 1987 (age 39)	(United States) Washington Spirit	2 (2016)
4	Emily Menges	(United States)	CB	July 28, 1992 (age 34)	2014 NWSL College Draft	4 (2014)
16	Emily Sonnett (FP)	(United States)	CB	November 25, 1993 (age 32)	2016 NWSL College Draft	2 (2016)
25	Meghan Klingenberg (FP)	(United States)	LB	August 2, 1988 (age 38)	(United States) Houston Dash	2 (2016)
32	Meg Morris	(United States)	LB / FW	May 11, 1992 (age 34)	(United States) Sky Blue FC	2 (2016)
Midfielders
7	Lindsey Horan (FP)	(United States)	CM	May 26, 1994 (age 32)	(France) Paris Saint-Germain	2 (2016)
10	Allie Long (FP)	(United States)	LW / CM	August 13, 1987 (age 39)	(United States) New York Fury	5 (2013)
11	Dagný Brynjarsdóttir	(Iceland)	MF	August 10, 1991 (age 35)	(Iceland) UMF Selfoss	2 (2016)
15	Kendall Johnson	(United States)	MF / DF	April 24, 1991 (age 35)	(United States) Sky Blue FC	3 (2015)
17	Tobin Heath (FP)	(United States)	LW	May 29, 1988 (age 38)	(France) Paris Saint-Germain	5 (2013)
28	Amandine Henry	(France)	CM	September 28, 1989 (age 37)	(France) Olympique Lyonnais	2 (2016)
30	Celeste Boureille	(United States)	MF	April 20, 1994 (age 32)	(Iceland) UMF Selfoss	2 (2016)
Forwards
9	Nadia Nadim	(Denmark)	CF / RW	January 2, 1988 (age 38)	(United States) Sky Blue FC	2 (2016)
12	Christine Sinclair	(Canada)	CF	June 12, 1983 (age 43)	(United States) Western New York Flash	5 (2013)
14	Ashleigh Sykes	(Australia)	FW	December 15, 1991 (age 34)	(Australia) Canberra United FC	1 (2017)
21	Hayley Raso	(Australia)	FW / RW	September 5, 1994 (age 32)	(United States) Washington Spirit	2 (2016)
26	Mallory Weber	(United States)	FW / CB	April 4, 1994 (age 32)	2016 NWSL College Draft	2 (2016)
34	Tyler Lussi	(United States)	FW	January 26, 1995 (age 31)	2017 NWSL College Draft	1 (2017)
13	Savannah Jordan	(United States)	FW	January 24, 1995 (age 31)	2017 NWSL College Draft	1 (2017)

- (HG) = homegrown player
- (FP) = Federation player
- (Loan) = on loan
- (AP) = amateur player

== Player transactions ==
=== National Team/Federation player allocation ===
Date	Player	Positions played	New/returning	Notes	Ref.
April 5, 2017	(United States) Tobin Heath	LW	Returning	2017 U.S. Women's National Team allocation process	
April 5, 2017	(United States) Lindsey Horan	CM	Returning	2017 U.S. Women's National Team allocation process	
April 5, 2017	(United States) Meghan Klingenberg	LB	Returning	2017 U.S. Women's National Team allocation process	
April 5, 2017	(United States) Emily Sonnett	CB	Returning	2017 U.S. Women's National Team allocation process	
April 5, 2017	(United States) Allie Long	LW / CM	Newly allocated	2017 U.S. Women's National Team allocation process	

=== Transfers in ===
Date	Player	Positions played	Previous club	Fee/notes	Ref.
March 7, 2017	(Australia) Ashleigh Sykes	FW	(Australia) Canberra United	Sykes was added to the roster on June 13.	
March 8, 2017	(United States) Britt Eckerstrom	GK	(United States) North Carolina Courage		
April 14, 2017	(United States) Meghan Cox	DF			

=== Loans in ===
Date	Player	Positions played	Previous club	Fee/notes	Ref.

=== Loans out ===
Date	Player	Positions played	Destination club	Fee/notes	Ref.
October 20, 2016	(Australia) Hayley Raso	FW	(Australia) Canberra United	Returned for the start of the 2017 season.	
October 20, 2016	(United States) Celeste Boureille	MF	(Australia) Canberra United	Returned for the start of the 2017 season.	
January 27, 2017	(France) Amandine Henry	MF	(France) Paris Saint-Germain	Returned for the start of the 2017 season.	

=== Transfers out ===
Date	Player	Positions played	Destination club	Fee/notes	Ref.
October 17, 2016	(United States) Kat Williamson	LB	N/A	Retired from soccer.	
October 19, 2016	(United States) Jen Skogerboe	DF	(South Korea) Suwon FMC	Option declined.	
October 19, 2016	(United States) Michelle Betos	GK	(Norway) Vålerenga	Out of contract. Offered extended contract but declined.	

=== Contract extensions ===
Date	Player	Positions played	Year with club (year signed)	Notes	Ref.
October 19, 2016	(United States) Emily Menges	DF	4 (2014)		
October 19, 2016	(United States) Meleana Shim	MF	5 (2013)		

=== Player's rights sold ===
Date	Player	Positions	To	Notes	Ref
January 18, 2017	(United States) Rachel Hill	FW	Orlando Pride	Traded rights for first-round and fourth-round picks in the 2018 NWSL College Draft.	

=== National Women's Soccer League College Draft ===
Round (overall pick)	Player	Positions played	Previous club	Notes	Ref.
2 (14)	Rachel Hill	MF / FW	(United States) UConn Huskies		
2 (18)	Savannah Jordan	FW	(United States) Florida Gators	Portland Thorns FC traded up to acquire the No. 18 overall selection from the North Carolina Courage, who picked up the No. 20 and No. 27 picks in exchange.	
3 (21)	Tyler Lussi	FW	(United States) Princeton Tigers	Portland Thorns FC traded up to acquire the No. 18 overall selection from the North Carolina Courage, who picked up the No. 20 and No. 27 picks in exchange.	
4 (40)	Caroline Flynn	MF	(United States) Nebraska Cornhuskers		

The draft was held on January 12, 2017.

=== Staff in ===
Date	Name	Position	Previous club	Notes	Ref.
May 25, 2017	(United States) Tobin Heath	Assistant Youth Technical Director	Portland Thorns FC (Current Player)	Not playing due to lingering back injury, no timeline for when she will play again.	

=== Staff contract extensions ===
Date	Name	Position	Notes	Ref.
November 8, 2016	Mark Parsons	Head coach	Re-signed long-term contract.	
November 8, 2016	Nadine Angerer	Director of goalkeeping	Re-signed contract extension as Director of goalkeeping.	

=== Staff out ===
Date	Name	Position	Destination club	Notes	Ref.

=== National team participation ===
Seven Thorns players have been called up to play for their national teams during this season.

Team	Players	Positions	# of call-ups	Ref.
United States	Lindsey Horan	MF	5	
United States	Allie Long	MF	5	
United States	Meghan Klingenberg	DF	4	
United States	Tobin Heath	MF	4	
United States	Adrianna Franch	GK	2	
United States	Emily Sonnett	DF	2	
United States	Emily Menges	DF	1	

== Honors and awards ==
=== NWSL Player of the Month ===
Month	Result	Player	Ref.

=== NWSL Weekly Awards ===
==== NWSL Player of the Week ====
Week	Result	Player	Ref
8	Won	(United States) Lindsey Horan	
18	Won	(Australia) Hayley Raso	NWSL 2017 Weekly Awards

==== NWSL Goal of the Week ====
Week	Result	Player	Ref.
1	Nominated	(Canada) Christine Sinclair	
4	Nominated	(United States) Allie Long	
8	Won	(United States) Lindsey Horan	
11	Nominated	(Australia) Hayley Raso	
12	Won	(Australia) Hayley Raso	
20	Won	(Canada) Christine Sinclair	NWSL 2017 Weekly Awards

==== NWSL Save of the Week ====
Week	Result	Player	Ref.
3	Won	(United States) Adrianna Franch	
4	Nominated	(United States) Adrianna Franch	
5	Nominated	(United States) Adrianna Franch	
8	Won	(United States) Adrianna Franch	
15	Won	(United States) Adrianna Franch	NWSL 2017 Weekly Awards
16	Won	(United States) Adrianna Franch	NWSL 2017 Weekly Awards

=== Other awards ===
Award	Player	Result	Ref.
CONCACAF Female Goalkeeper of the Year	(United States) Adrianna Franch	Won	
CONCACAF Best XI	(United States) Lindsey Horan, (United States) Allie Long, (United States) Emily Menges	Team Member	
NWSL Goalkeeper of the Year	(United States) Adrianna Franch	Won	
NWSL Best XI	(United States) Adrianna Franch	Team Member	
NWSL Second XI	(United States) Lindsey Horan, (United States) Emily Menges	Team Member	

== Statistics ==
=== Appearances ===
No.	Pos.	Name	NWSL				NWSL Playoffs				Total			
No.	Pos.	Name	Apps	Goals	Yellow card	Red card	Apps	Goals	Yellow card	Red card	Apps	Goals	Yellow card	Red card
2	DF	(United States) Katherine Reynolds	10	0	1	0	2	0	0	0	12	0	1	0
4	DF	(United States) Emily Menges	23	0	0	0	2	0	0	0	25	0	0	0
6	MF	(United States) Meleana Shim	6	0	0	0	0	0	0	0	6	0	0	0
7	MF	(United States) Lindsey Horan	24	4	4	0	2	1	0	0	26	5	4	0
9	FW	(Denmark) Nadia Nadim	16	6	1	0	2	0	0	0	18	6	1	0
10	MF	(United States) Allie Long	21	2	1	0	2	0	0	0	23	2	1	0
11	MF	(Iceland) Dagný Brynjarsdóttir	11	0	4	0	2	0	1	0	13	0	5	0
12	FW	(Canada) Christine Sinclair	24	8	3	0	2	1	0	0	26	9	3	0
13	FW	(United States) Savannah Jordan	2	0	0	0	0	0	0	0	2	0	0	0
14	FW	(Australia) Ashleigh Sykes	15	1	1	0	2	0	0	0	17	1	1	0
15	MF	(United States) Kendall Johnson	4	0	0	0	0	0	0	0	4	0	0	0
16	DF	(United States) Emily Sonnett	24	3	2	0	2	1	0	0	26	4	2	0
17	MF	(United States) Tobin Heath	2	0	1	0	2	0	0	0	4	0	1	0
19	MF	(United States) Ashley Herndon	1	0	0	0	0	0	0	0	1	0	0	0
20	DF	(United States) Kelli Hubly	2	0	0	0	0	0	0	0	2	0	0	0
21	FW	(Australia) Hayley Raso	22	6	6	0	2	1	1	0	24	7	7	0
24	GK	(United States) Adrianna Franch	24	0	0	0	2	0	0	0	26	0	0	0
25	DF	(United States) Meghan Klingenberg	23	0	1	0	2	0	0	0	25	0	1	0
26	FW	(United States) Mallory Weber	15	1	1	0	0	0	0	0	15	1	1	0
27	DF	(United States) Meghan Cox	10	2	2	0	0	0	0	0	10	2	2	0
28	MF	(France) Amandine Henry	21	3	4	0	2	1	1	0	23	4	5	0
30	MF	(United States) Celeste Boureille	15	0	1	0	0	0	0	0	15	0	1	0
32	MF	(United States) Meg Morris	1	0	0	0	0	0	0	0	1	0	0	0
33	GK	(United States) Britt Eckerstrom	0	0	0	0	0	0	0	0	0	0	0	0
34	FW	(United States) Tyler Lussi	3	1	0	0	0	0	0	0	3	1	0	0
Players who were transferred/waived from the club during active season or on loan

Last updated: 25 May 2018.
Source: NWSL statistics

=== Goalkeeper stats ===
No.	Player	NWSL				NWSL Playoffs				Total			
No.	Player	Min	GA	GAA	SV	Min	GA	GAA	SV	Min	GA	GAA	SV
24	(United States) Adrianna Franch	2160	20	0.83	80	180	1	0.50	5	2340	21	0.81	85
33	(United States) Britt Eckerstrom	0	0	n/a	0	0	0	n/a	0	0	0	n/a	0
	TOTALS	2160	20	0.83	80	180	1	0.50	5	2340	21	0.81	85

Last updated: 25 May 2018.
Source: NWSL statistics

=== Top scorers ===
Rank	Pos	No.	Player	NWSL	NWSL Playoffs	Total
1	FW	12	(Canada) Christine Sinclair	8	1	9
2	FW	21	(Australia) Hayley Raso	6	1	7
3	FW	9	(Denmark) Nadia Nadim	6	0	6
4	MF	7	(United States) Lindsey Horan	4	1	5
5	DF	16	(United States) Emily Sonnett	3	1	4
5	MF	28	(France) Amandine Henry	3	1	4
7	MF	10	(United States) Allie Long	2	0	2
Other Thorns with 1 goal each				3	0	3
Own goals by other teams				2	0	2
Total				37	5	42

Last updated: 25 May 2018.
Source: NWSL statistics

=== Top assists ===
Rank	Pos	No.	Player	NWSL	NWSL Playoffs	Total
1	DF	24	(United States) Meghan Klingenberg	6	1	7
2	FW	9	(Denmark) Nadia Nadim	3	1	4
3	FW	21	(Australia) Hayley Raso	3	0	3
3	MF	7	(United States) Lindsey Horan	2	1	3
5	FW	7	(United States) Tyler Lussi	2	0	2
6	Others with 1 assist each			4	0	4
Total				20	3	23

Last updated: 25 May 2018.
Source: NWSL statistics

=== Clean sheets ===
Rnk	No.	Player	NWSL	NWSL Playoffs	Total
1	24	(United States) Adrianna Franch	11	1	12
Total			11	1	12

Last updated: 25 May 2018.
Source: NWSL statistics on Franch

=== Summary ===
All statistics are for National Women's Soccer League games.

Games played	26
Games won	16
Games drawn	5
Games lost	5
Goals scored	42
Goals conceded	21
Goal difference	+21
Clean sheets	12
Yellow cards	33
Red cards	0
Most appearances	26 (4 players)
Top scorer	(Canada) Christine Sinclair (9 goals)
Top assister	(United States) Meghan Klingenberg (7 assists)
Top goalkeeper	(United States) Adrianna Franch (0.81 goals-against average)
Winning percentage	61.5% (16/26)

Last updated: 25 May 2018.
Source: NWSL statistics

== See also ==
- 2017 National Women's Soccer League season
