= 2018 Portland Thorns FC season =

Portland Thorns FC
2018 season
- President: Merritt Paulson
- Head coach: Mark Parsons
- Stadium: Providence Park; Portland, Oregon (Capacity: 21,144)
- National Women's Soccer League: 2nd
- NWSL Playoffs: Final (eliminated by North Carolina Courage)
- Top goalscorer: Lindsey Horan (13 goals)
- Highest home attendance: 21,144 (Sept. 7 vs. Seattle reign FC)
- Lowest home attendance: 14,485 (Apr. 20 vs. Washington Spirit)
- Average home league attendance: 16,959
- Biggest win: 4–0 (Jul. 6 vs. Utah Royals FC)
- Biggest defeat: 1–4 (May 30 vs. North Carolina Courage)
Home colors	Away colors

The 2018 Portland Thorns FC season was the team's sixth season of existence. The Thorns played in the National Women's Soccer League (NWSL), the top division of women's soccer in the United States. The Thorns entered the season as defending NWSL Champions.

== Season review ==
=== Off-season ===
On September 21, 2017, Raso signed a loan with Brisbane Roar for the 2017–18 W-League season.

on September 24, 2017, the club announced that midfielder Amandine Henry and forward Nadia Nadim will not be returning to the Portland Thorns in 2018 season. The moves were made for financial reasons, NWSL has a strict salary cap of $315,000 for each team and the Thorns could not compete with the offers made by Lyon and Manchester City.

In October 2017, Boureille was loaned to Brisbane Roar for the 2017–18 W-League season.

On October 24, 2017, it was announced that Sonnett signed a loan with Sydney FC for the 2017–18 W-League season.

On January 11, 2018, the club acquired the rights to Australian forward Caitlin Foord and a 2020 conditional natural second-round draft pick from the Seattle Reign in exchange for Allie Long.

On January 12, 2018, Portland acquired Brazilian midfielder Andressinha from the Houston Dash in exchange for forward Savannah Jordan.

On January 17, 2018, Portland Thorns FC selected midfielders Sandra Yu and Gabby Seiler and goalkeeper Bella Geist from the 2018 NWSL College Draft.

On February 15, 2018, Ashleigh Sykes announced her retirement from professional soccer.

== Competitions ==
Win Tie Loss

=== Preseason ===
Thorns Spring Invitational presented by Tillamook Yogurt

Mar 11, Sun 1	Portland Thorns FC	0–1	Chicago Red Stars	Portland, Oregon
5 PM PT		Report	Gilliland 62' (Nagasato)	Stadium: Merlo Field; Attendance: 3,822

Mar 14, Wed 2	Portland Thorns FC	2–2	U.S. U-23s WNT	Portland, Oregon
7:30 PM PT	Onumonu 19' (Horan); Weber 34' (Klingenberg)	Report	Macario 58', 90' (Weaver)	Stadium: Merlo Field; Attendance: 2,217

Mar 17, Sat 3	Portland Thorns FC	0–0	Houston Dash	Portland, Oregon
7:30 PM PT		Report		Stadium: Merlo Field; Attendance: 3,119

=== Regular season ===
Mar 24, Sat 1	North Carolina Courage	1–0	Portland Thorns FC	Cary, North Carolina
12:30 (PST)	Hinkle (yellow card) 51'; Debinha 70' (O'Sullivan)	Report	Sonnett (yellow card) 33'; Horan (yellow card) 35'	Stadium: WakeMed Soccer Park; Attendance: 4,210; Referee: Ramy Touchan
Note: Televised on Lifetime.

Mar 31, Sat 2	Chicago Red Stars	2–3	Portland Thorns FC	Bridgeview, Illinois
17:15 (PST)	Mautz 31' (Huerta), 67' (Huerta); Colaprico (yellow card) 64'	Report	Horan 9'; Sinclair 40', 65' (PK); Boureille (yellow card) 58'	Stadium: Toyota Park; Attendance: 13,678; Referee: Greg Dopka

Apr 15, Sun 3	Portland Thorns FC	2–1	Orlando Pride	Portland, Oregon
15:00 (PST)	Horan 28' (Sinclair); Sinclair 39' (Horan)	Report	Ubogagu 20' (Nairn); Pressley (yellow card) 85'	Stadium: Providence Park; Attendance: 16,466; Referee: Farhad Dadkho

Apr 20, Fri 4	Portland Thorns FC	1–1	Washington Spirit	Portland, Oregon
19:30 (PST)	Sonnett (yellow card) 39'; Sinclair 45+2' (PK); Horan (yellow card) 88'	Report	Ordega 37'; Bledsoe (yellow card) 86'	Stadium: Providence Park; Attendance: 14,485; Referee: Matt Franz

Apr 28, Sat 5	Utah Royals FC	1–1	Portland Thorns FC	Sandy, Utah
18:00 (PST)	Rodriguez 53'; Jónsdóttir (yellow card) 49'; Scott (yellow card) 85'	Report	Purce (yellow card) 36'; Heath 67' (Sinclair)	Stadium: Rio Tinto Stadium; Attendance: 8,446; Referee: Katja Koroleva

May 5, Sat 6	Portland Thorns FC	2–3	Seattle Reign FC	Portland, Oregon
12:30 (PST)	Sonnett 61'; Horan 70' (Klingenberg)	Report	Long (yellow card) 31'; Yanez 36' (Kawasumi); Taylor 64' (PK); Utsugi 75' (Catley); Kleiner (yellow card) 87'	Stadium: Providence Park; Attendance: 16,054; Referee: Karen Abt
Note: Televised on Lifetime.

May 9, Wed 7	Houston Dash	1–1	Portland Thorns FC	Houston, Texas
17:00 (PST)	Simon 57' (Latsko); Van Wyk (yellow card) 90+1'	Report	Crnogorčević 25' (Sinclair)	Stadium: BBVA Compass Stadium; Attendance: 2,668; Referee: Luis Guardia

May 12, Sat 8	Portland Thorns FC	1–2	Orlando Pride	Portland, Oregon
12:30 (PST)	Sinclair 23' (Heath) (yellow card) 76'; Andressinha (yellow card) 65'	Report	Morgan 11'; Nairn 21'; Pickett (yellow card) 64'; Watherholt (yellow card) 83'	Stadium: Providence Park; Attendance: 17,115; Referee: Rosendo Mendoza
Note: Televised on Lifetime.

May 19, Sat 9	Washington Spirit	0–1	Portland Thorns FC	Boyds, Maryland
16:00 (PST)		Report	Carpenter 68' (Crnogorčević); Horan (yellow card) 84'	Stadium: Maryland SoccerPlex; Attendance: 3,284; Referee: Guido Gonzales Jr.

May 25, Fri 10	Portland Thorns FC	2–0	Utah Royals FC	Portland, Oregon
19:30 (PST)	Sinclair 18' (Heath); Horan 39' (Klingenberg) (yellow card) 67'	Report	Corsie (yellow card) 69'; Jónsdóttir (yellow card) 83'	Stadium: Providence Park; Attendance: 15,113; Referee: Lukasz Szpala

May 30, Wed 11	Portland Thorns FC	1–4	North Carolina Courage	Portland, Oregon
19:30 (PST)	Sinclair (yellow card) 38'; Klingenberg (yellow card) 70'; Reynolds 89'	Report	Williams 31' (PK), 62' (Mewis); Debinha 58' (Dunn); Mewis 64' (Zerboni); Mathias (yellow card) 79'; Hamilton (yellow card) 88'	Stadium: Providence Park; Attendance: 15,018; Referee: Joseph Dickerson

Jun 16, Sat 12	Chicago Red Stars	1–1	Portland Thorns FC	Bridgeview, Illinois
17:00 (PST)	Nagasato 43'; Stanton (yellow card) 62'	Report	Hubly (yellow card) 42'; Horan 48' (yellow card) 54'; Lussi (yellow card) 71'	Stadium: Toyota Park; Attendance: 4,093; Referee: Danielle Chesky
Note: Televised on ESPNews.

Jun 22, Fri 13	Houston Dash	1–3	Portland Thorns FC	Houston, Texas
17:30 (PST)	Huerta 12'; Simon (yellow card) 85'	Report	Heath 9' (Sinclair); Crnogorčević 33'; Sinclair 83' (Lussi)	Stadium: BBVA Compass Stadium; Attendance: 3,480; Referee: Jasmine Peralta

Jun 27, Wed 14	Portland Thorns FC	1–1	Sky Blue FC	Portland, Oregon
19:30 (PST)	Horan 45' (Sinclair); Salem (yellow card) 90+2'	Report	Beckie (yellow card) 41'; Lloyd 77' (PK); Freeman (yellow card) 90+3'	Stadium: Providence Park; Attendance: 18,237; Referee: Katja Koroleva

Jun 30, Sat 15	Seattle Reign FC	1–0	Portland Thorns FC	Seattle, Washington
19:00 (PST)	Barnes (yellow card) 35'; Taylor 89'	Report	Klingenberg (yellow card) 14'	Stadium: Memorial Stadium; Attendance: 4,781; Referee: Christina Unkel

Jul 6, Fri 16	Portland Thorns FC	4–0	Utah Royals FC	Portland, Oregon
20:00 (PST)	Heath 2' (Crnogorčević); Horan 32' (Heath); Crnogorčević 34'; Lussi 62' (Horan)	Report	Johnson (yellow card) 31'; Matheson (yellow card) 45'	Stadium: Providence Park; Attendance: 17,930; Referee: Farhad Dadkho

Jul 15, Sun 17	Portland Thorns FC	3–1	Houston Dash	Portland, Oregon
20:00 (PST)	Horan 16' (Sonnett) 31'; Crnogorčević 48' (Raso)	Report	Ohai 37'	Stadium: Providence Park; Attendance: 15,327; Referee: Eric Tattersall

Jul 21, Sat 18	Sky Blue FC	1–2	Portland Thorns FC	Piscataway, New Jersey
16:00 (PST)	Dorsey 27' (McCaskill)	Report	Raso 4' (Sinclair); Crnogorčević 7'; Sinclair (yellow card) 80'	Stadium: Yurcak Field; Attendance: 2,338; Referee: Reyna Fonseca

Aug 5, Sun 19	North Carolina Courage	2–1	Portland Thorns FC	Cary, North Carolina
15:00 (PST)	Williams 37' (McDonald) 45'	Report	Sonett (yellow card) 45+3'; Horan 49' (Heath); Foord (yellow card) 85'	Stadium: WakeMed Soccer Park; Attendance: 5,379; Referee: Michael Radchuk

Aug 11, Sat 20	Orlando Pride	0–2	Portland Thorns FC	Orlando, Florida
16:30 (PST)	Marta (yellow card) 73'	Report	Sinclair (yellow card) 27'; Horan 47' (Heath); Raso 53' (Crnogorčević)	Stadium: Orlando City Stadium; Attendance: 6,102; Referee: Katja Koroleva

Aug 18, Sat 21	Portland Thorns FC	2–2	Chicago Red Stars	Portland, Oregon
19:30 (PST)	Heath 60'; Sonnett (yellow card) 67'; Sinclair 69' (Heath)	Report	Kerr 44' (Nagasato), 49' (DiBernardo); White (yellow card) 81'	Stadium: Providence Park; Attendance: 18,631; Referee: Guido Gonzales
Note: Televised on ESPNews.

Aug 22, Wed 22	Portland Thorns FC	2–1	Sky Blue FC	Portland, Oregon
20:00 (PST)	Sinclair 13' (pen.); Heath 54'	Report	Tiernan (yellow card) 41'; McCaskill (yellow card) 67'; Johnson (yellow card) 75'; Killion 85'; Hoy (yellow card) 88'	Stadium: Providence Park; Attendance: 17,986; Referee: Mark Allatin

Aug 25, Sat 23	Washington Spirit	0–1	Portland Thorns FC	Washington, D.C.
17:00 (PST)	Church (yellow card) 40'	Report	Heath 15' (Raso)	Stadium: Audi Field; Attendance: 7,976; Referee: Katja Koroleva
Note: Televised on ESPNews.

Sep 7, Fri 24	Portland Thorns FC	3–1	Seattle Reign FC	Portland, Oregon
19:00 (PST)	Horan 30' 82' (Heath); Heath 49'; Sonnett (yellow card) 60'	Report	Fishlock 4' (Addo); Addo (yellow card) 62'; Catley (yellow card) 87'	Stadium: Providence Park; Attendance: 21,144; Referee: Tim Ford
Note: Televised on Lifetime.

=== Postseason ===
Sep 15, Sat Semifinal	Portland Thorns FC	2–1	Seattle Reign FC	Portland, Oregon
12:00 (PST)	Sonnett (yellow card) 27'; Heath 43' (Horan); Menges (yellow card) 50'; Horan 77' (Sinclair)	Report	Spencer 29'; Fishlock (yellow card) 40'; Rapinoe (yellow card) 54'; Long (yellow card) 60'	Stadium: Providence Park; Attendance: 14,179; Referee: Ramy Touchan
Note: Televised on Lifetime.

Sep 22, Sat Final	North Carolina Courage	3–0	Portland Thorns FC	Portland, Oregon
13:30 (PST)	Debinha 13'; McDonald 40' (Hinkle), 64' (Mathias) (yellow card) 65'; O'Sullivan (yellow card) 42'	Report		Stadium: Providence Park; Attendance: 21,144; Referee: Guido Gonzales Jr. Assistant referees: Brooke Mayo, Adrienne McDonald; Fourth official: Karen Abt
Note: Televised on Lifetime.

==== Regular-season standings ====
Pos	Team	Pld	W	D	L	GF	GA	GD	Pts	
1	North Carolina Courage (C)	24	17	6	1	53	17	+36	57	NWSL Shield
2	Portland Thorns FC	24	12	6	6	40	28	+12	42	NWSL Playoffs
3	Seattle Reign FC	24	11	8	5	27	19	+8	41	NWSL Playoffs
4	Chicago Red Stars	24	9	10	5	38	28	+10	37	NWSL Playoffs
5	Utah Royals FC	24	9	8	7	22	23	−1	35	
6	Houston Dash	24	9	5	10	35	39	−4	32	
7	Orlando Pride	24	8	6	10	30	37	−7	30	
8	Washington Spirit	24	2	5	17	12	35	−23	11	
9	Sky Blue FC	24	1	6	17	21	52	−31	9	

Source: NWSL
Rules for classification: Tiebreakers
(C) Champions

==== Results by round ====
Matchday	1	2	3	4	5	6	7	8	9	10	11	12	13	14	15	16	17	18	19	20	21	22	23	24
Stadium	A	A	H	H	A	H	A	H	A	H	H	A	A	H	A	H	H	A	A	A	H	H	A	H
Result	L	W	W	D	D	L	D	L	W	W	L	D	W	D	L	W	W	W	L	W	D	W	W	W
Position (Note: POR's position at the end of the matchweek, not their match.)	9	4	3	3	3	4	4	5	3	4	4	5	4	4	6	5	5	3	4	3	3	3	3	2

Updated to match(es) played on September 7, 2018. Source: Schedule
A = Away; H = Home; W = Win; D = Draw; L = Loss

== Club ==
=== Executive staff ===
Owner and Chief Executive Officer	Merritt Paulson
President of Business	Mike Golub
GM/President of Soccer	Gavin Wilkinson

Updated to match played August 3, 2018
Source: Portland Timbers

=== Coaching staff ===
Position	Staff
Head Coach	Mark Parsons
Assistant Coach	Rich Gunney
Assistant Coach/Equipment Manager	Sophie Clough
Assistant Coach/Community Youth Development Coach	Carly Copplestone
Goalkeeping Coach	Nadine Angerer
Fitness Coach	Garga Caserta
Athletic Trainer	Bailey Torrez
Team Physician	Breanne Brown

Last updated: August 3, 2018
Source: Portland Timbers

== Squad information ==
=== First team squad ===
Last updated: March 27, 2018

No.	Name	Nationality	Positions	Date of birth (age)	Signed from	Year with club (year signed)
Goalkeepers
24	Adrianna Franch	(United States)	GK	November 12, 1990 (age 35)	(Norway) Avaldsnes IL	3 (2016)
33	Britt Eckerstrom	(United States)	GK	May 28, 1993 (age 32)	(United States) North Carolina Courage	2 (2017)
Defenders
2	Katherine Reynolds	(United States)	RB/CB	September 14, 1987 (age 38)	(United States) Washington Spirit	3 (2016)
4	Emily Menges	(United States)	CB	July 28, 1992 (age 33)	2014 NWSL College Draft	5 (2014)
16	Emily Sonnett (FP)	(United States)	CB	November 25, 1993 (age 32)	2016 NWSL College Draft	3 (2016)
25	Meghan Klingenberg	(United States)	LB/LM	August 2, 1988 (age 37)	(United States) Houston Dash	3 (2016)
32	Meg Morris	(United States)	LB / FW	May 11, 1992 (age 33)	(United States) Sky Blue FC	3 (2016)
27	Elizabeth Ball	(United States)	CB/RB	October 20, 1995 (age 30)		1 (2018)
15	Ellie Carpenter	(Australia)	CB	April 28, 2000 (age 25)	(Australia) Canberra United	1 (2018)
20	Kelli Hubly	(United States)	CB	August 9, 1994 (age 31)		2 (2017)
Midfielders
10	Lindsey Horan (FP)	(United States)	CM	May 26, 1994 (age 31)	(France) Paris Saint-Germain	3 (2016)
8	Andressa Cavalari	(Brazil)	CAM	May 1, 1995 (age 30)	(United States) Houston Dash	1 (2018)
17	Tobin Heath (FP)	(United States)	LW	May 29, 1988 (age 37)	(France) Paris Saint-Germain	6 (2013)
30	Celeste Boureille	(United States)	MF	April 20, 1994 (age 31)	(Iceland) UMF Selfoss	3 (2016)
36	Angela Salem	(United States)	MF	July 24, 1988 (age 37)	(United States) Boston Breakers	1 (2018)
Forwards
9	Caitlin Foord	(Australia)	CF / LW	November 11, 1994 (age 31)	(Australia) Sydney FC	1 (2018)
12	Christine Sinclair	(Canada)	CF/CAM	June 12, 1983 (age 42)	(United States) Western New York Flash	6 (2013)
22	Ifeoma Onumonu	(United States)	FW	February 25, 1994 (age 32)	(United States) Boston Breakers	1 (2018)
21	Hayley Raso	(Australia)	FW/ RW / RM	September 5, 1994 (age 31)	(United States) Washington Spirit	3 (2016)
26	Mallory Weber	(United States)	FW / RW	April 4, 1994 (age 31)	2016 NWSL College Draft	3 (2016)
34	Tyler Lussi	(United States)	FW	January 26, 1995 (age 31)	2017 NWSL College Draft	2 (2017)
23	Margaret Purce	(United States)	FW/RM	September 18, 1995 (age 30)	(United States) Boston Breakers	1 (2018)
7	Ana-Maria Crnogorčević	(Switzerland)	FW	October 3, 1990 (age 35)	(Germany) FFC Frankfurt	1 (2018)

- (FP) = Federation player
- (Loan) = on loan

== Honors and awards ==
=== NWSL Season Awards ===
- Most Valuable Player: Lindsey Horan
- Defender of the Year: Emily Sonnett (finalist)
- Coach of the Year: Mark Parsons (finalist)
- Goalkeeper of the Year: Adrianna Franch (finalist)
- Best XI: Adrianna Franch, Emily Sonnett, Lindsey Horan, Tobin Heath
- Second XI: Emily Menges, Christine Sinclair

=== NWSL Team of the Month ===
Month	Goalkeeper	Defenders	Midfielders	Forwards	Ref.
March		(United States) Emily Sonnett	(United States) Lindsey Horan		
April		(United States) Emily Sonnett			
May			(United States) Lindsey Horan	(Canada) Christine Sinclair	
June			(United States) Lindsey Horan	(Canada) Christine Sinclair	
July	(United States) Adrianna Franch		(United States) Lindsey Horan		
August			(United States) Lindsey Horan	(United States) Tobin Heath	

=== NWSL Player of the Month ===
Month	Result	Player	Ref.
July	Won	(United States) Lindsey Horan	

=== NWSL Weekly Awards ===
==== NWSL Player of the Week ====
Week	Result	Player	Ref
14	Won	(United States) Adrianna Franch	
20	Won	(United States) Adrianna Franch	
24	Won	(United States) Lindsey Horan	

==== NWSL Goal of the Week ====
Week	Result	Player	Ref.
2	Won	(United States) Lindsey Horan	
3	Won	(United States) Lindsey Horan	
5	Won	(United States) Tobin Heath	
8	Nominated	(Australia) Ellie Carpenter	
9	Nominated	(Canada) Christine Sinclair	
10	Won	(United States) Katherine Reynolds	
11/12	Nominated	(United States) Lindsey Horan	
13	Nominated	(Canada) Christine Sinclair	
15	Nominated	(United States) Tobin Heath	
16	Nominated	(United States) Lindsey Horan	
17	Nominated	(Australia) Hayley Raso	
19	Nominated	(United States) Lindsey Horan	
20	Won	(Australia) Hayley Raso	
21	Nominated	(Canada) Christine Sinclair	
22	Won	(United States) Tobin Heath	
24	Won	(United States) Lindsey Horan	

==== NWSL Save of the Week ====
Week	Result	Player	Ref.
1	Won	(United States) Adrianna Franch	
2	Nominated	(United States) Adrianna Franch	
9	Nominated	(United States) Meghan Klingenberg	
11/12	Won	(United States) Britt Eckerstrom	
13	Nominated	(United States) Adrianna Franch	
14	Won	(United States) Adrianna Franch	
15	Won	(United States) Adrianna Franch	
17	Nominated	(United States) Britt Eckerstrom	
19	Nominated	(United States) Adrianna Franch	
20	Won	(United States) Adrianna Franch	
21	Nominated	(United States) Adrianna Franch	

== See also ==
- 2018 National Women's Soccer League season
