= Meghan Cox =

American soccer defender

Personal information
- Full name: Meghan Ann Cox
- Date of birth: November 15, 1994 (age 31)
- Place of birth: Springfield, Virginia, United States
- Height: 5 ft 8 in (1.73 m)
- Position: Defender

Youth career
- Robert E. Lee HS
- VSA Heat Blue

College career
Years	Team	Apps	(Gls)
2013	James Madison Dukes	21	(3)
2014–2016	Virginia Cavaliers	67	(11)

Senior career*
Years	Team	Apps	(Gls)
2017	Portland Thorns FC	9	(0)
2017	Houston Dash	1	(0)
2019	Utah Royals FC	2	(0)
- * Club domestic league appearances and goals

Meghan Ann Cox (born November 15, 1994) is an American soccer player who plays as a defender.

== Early life ==
Cox attended Robert E. Lee High School where she earned several honors and accolades in soccer. Cox was elected most valuable player (MVP) as a sophomore and as a junior. She earned the Golden Ball Award as the national championship MVP. Cox was included in the All-State First Team in her junior year. She was nominated two-time All-Northern Region, three-time All-Patriot District and two-time Washington Post All-Met.

== Collegiate career ==
Cox attended James Madison University during her freshman year of college, playing 21 matches and scoring three goals for the Dukes. In her sophomore year, she transferred to the University of Virginia. She played three seasons for the Cavaliers, featured in 67 matches and scored 11 goals.

== Club career ==
In April 2017 the Portland Thorns FC announced they had signed Cox. She debuted for the Thorns on April 22, 2017, replacing Meghan Klingenberg in the 46th minute of the match against North Carolina Courage. In August, she was waived and picked up by the Dash. She left the team after half a season and returned to the University of Virginia to complete her degree.
