= Meghan Klingenberg =

American soccer player (born 1988)

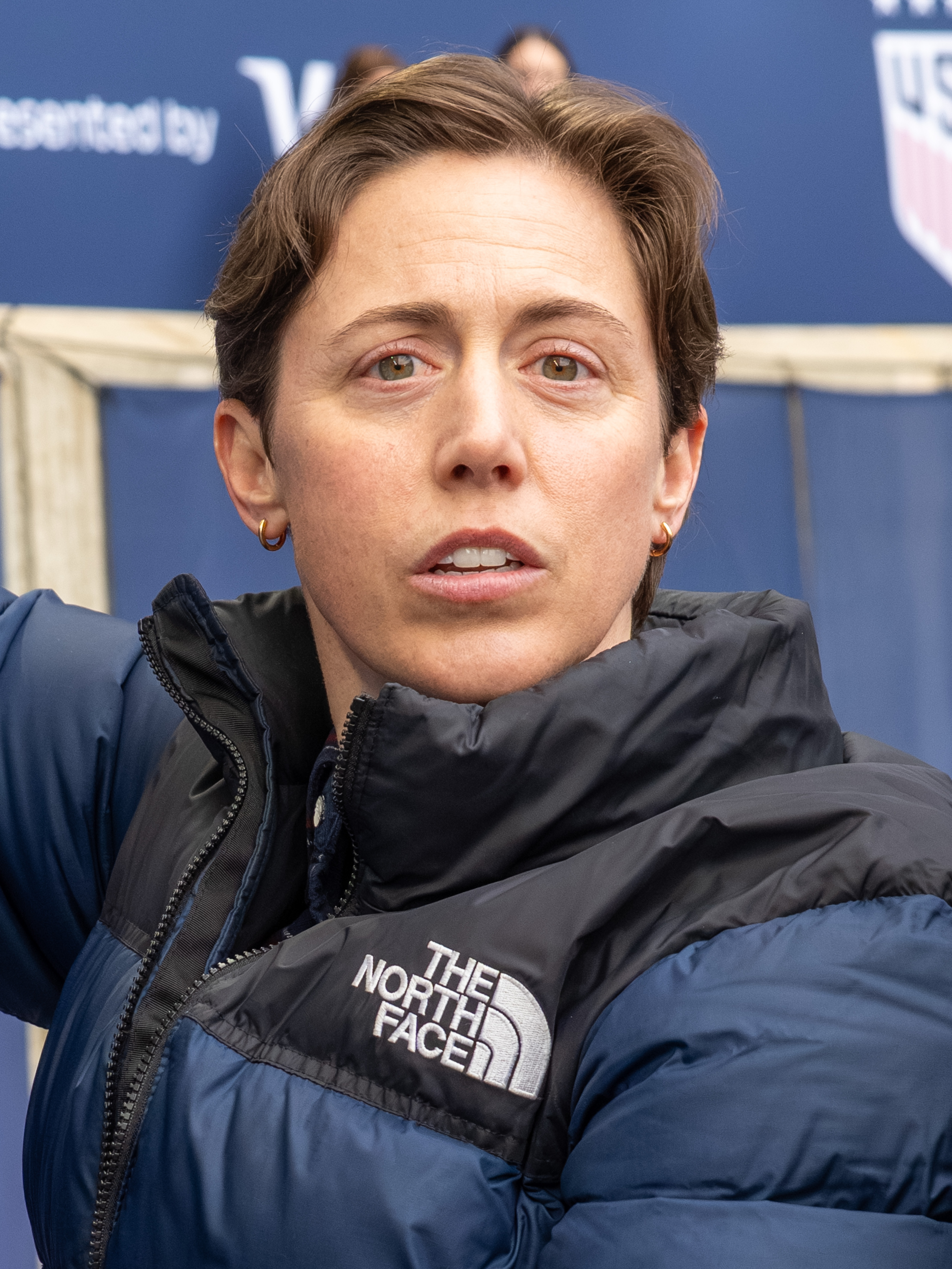
- Klingenberg in 2026

Personal information
- Full name: Meghan Elizabeth Klingenberg
- Date of birth: August 2, 1988 (age 38)
- Place of birth: Pittsburgh, Pennsylvania, U.S.
- Height: 5 ft 2 in (1.57 m)
- Position: Left back

College career
Years	Team	Apps	(Gls)
2007–2010	North Carolina Tar Heels	70	(18)

Senior career*
Years	Team	Apps	(Gls)
2011	magicJack	2	(0)
2011	Boston Breakers	10	(0)
2012	Western New York Flash	3	(2)
2012–2014	Tyresö FF	32	(2)
2014–2015	Houston Dash	19	(0)
2016–2024	Portland Thorns	151	(0)

International career^{‡}
2004	United States U-16		
2005	United States U-17		
2008	United States U-19		
2009–2010	United States U-23		
2011–2018	United States	75	(3)
Medal record
FIFA Women's World Cup
Gold medal – first place	2015 Canada	Team
- * Club domestic league appearances and goals as of September 3, 2024 ‡ National team caps and goals as of September 3, 2024

Meghan Elizabeth Klingenberg (born August 2, 1988) is an American former professional soccer player who played as a left back. She made 75 appearances and scored 3 goals for the United States national team, winning the 2015 FIFA Women's World Cup.

She played college soccer for the North Carolina Tar Heels, winning two national championships (2008 and 2009). After playing in the last season of Women's Professional Soccer (WPS), she joined Damallsvenskan champions Tyresö FF in Sweden in 2012. In 2014, she joined National Women's Soccer League (NWSL) expansion team Houston Dash, before moving to the Portland Thorns in 2016. She made over 150 appearances for the Thorns over nine seasons as she won two NWSL Championships and two NWSL Shields and was twice named in the NWSL Second XI.

== Early life ==
Klingenberg was born in Pittsburgh and raised in the North Hills suburb of Gibsonia, Pennsylvania. She has a younger brother named Drew who played college soccer at Penn State. She attended Pine-Richland High School from 2003 to 2007 and was the captain of the girls soccer team. In 2005, she helped lead Pine-Richland to the Pennsylvania state high school championship and was an NSCAA All-America selection. She was also named a Parade All-American.

Klingenberg claims she enhanced her soccer skills by practicing Taekwondo, and that the martial art made her a more aggressive player. She is now a black belt.

=== University of North Carolina ===
Klingenberg attended the University of North Carolina at Chapel Hill and was a four-year starter for the Tar Heels. She scored 18 career goals with 24 assists. Klingenberg was a highly flexible player, playing on all three lines for UNC.

As a freshman in 2007, she played in 24 games, starting 10, and earned Freshman All-ACC honors. She scored five goals with three assists and was a Soccer America First-Team All-Freshman selection. Klingenberg led UNC freshmen in all offensive categories and was an All-ACC Academic Team selection.

As a sophomore in 2008, she played in 20 games, starting eight, and missed the last six games of the season playing for the US at the 2008 FIFA U-20 Women's World Cup in Chile. She tied for second on the team with nine assists and two goals. Klingenberg was named to the ACC All-Academic women's soccer team and the ACC Honor Roll.

As a junior in 2009, she played in 26 games and played 1,668 minutes while scoring five goals with one assist. Klingenberg scored the game-winning goal in a 5–2 triumph over Wake Forest in the NCAA quarterfinals en route to her second consecutive national title.

As a senior in 2010, she was an NSCAA All-American while playing in all 24 games for the Tar Heels and was fourth on the team with 23 points. She had 11 assists (second on the team), scored six goals, and was named First-Team All-ACC.

Klingenberg studied business with a concentration in entrepreneurship while at UNC Chapel Hill.

== Club career ==
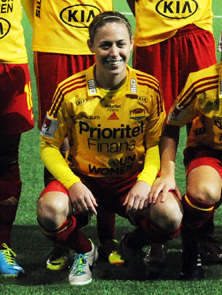
Klingenberg with Tyreso in 2013

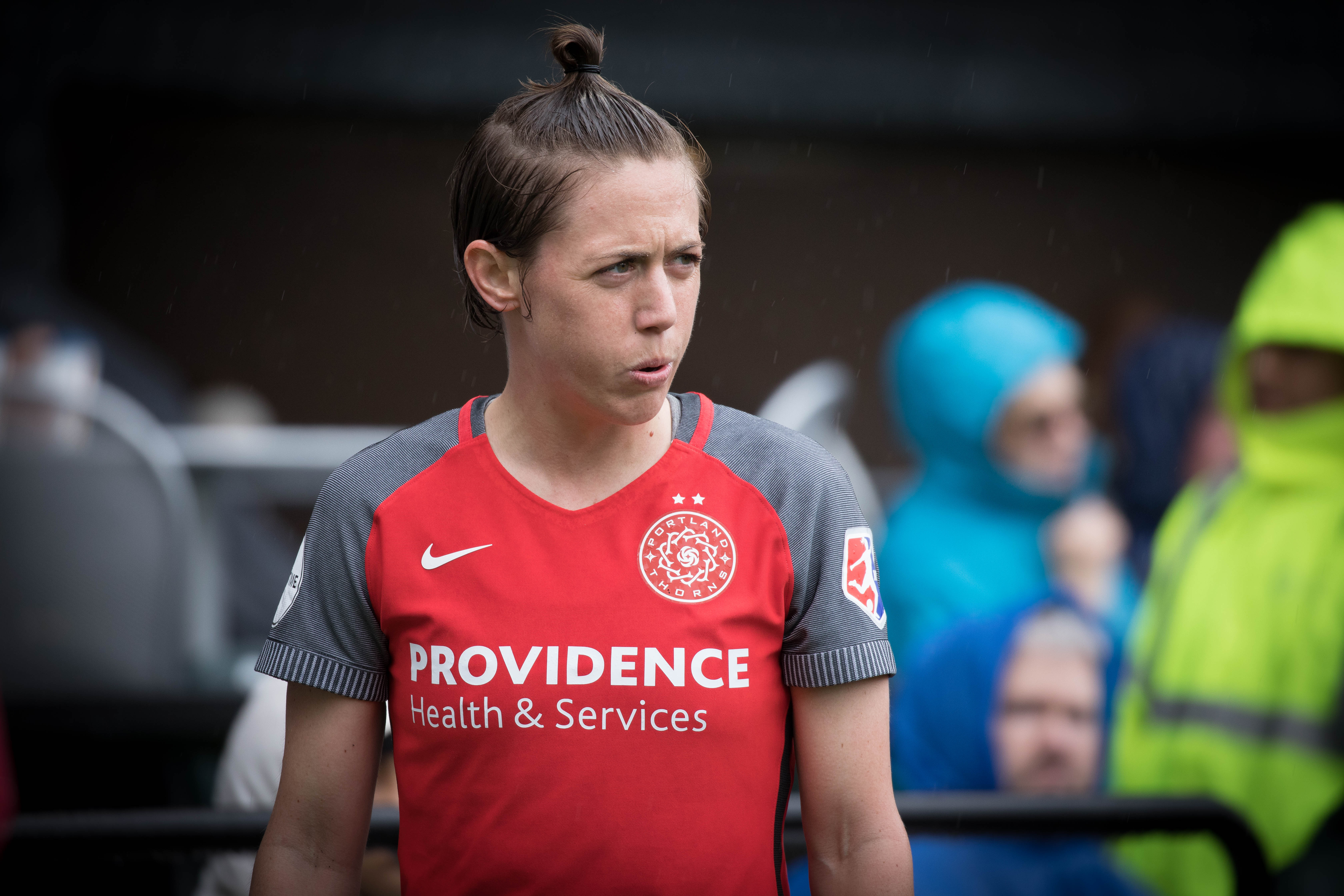
Klingenberg with Portland in 2018

=== WPS, 2011 ===
In 2011, Klingenberg was selected by the Washington Freedom in the first round of the WPS draft. After the team was moved to Florida and renamed magicJack, she was traded in early June to the Boston Breakers. Klingenberg played 10 matches for Boston, starting them all and totaling 961 minutes for the season. She ended the season with one goal and two assists. She also spent time at Western New York Flash where she won the 2012 Women's Premier Soccer League Elite.

=== Tyresö FF, 2012–2013 ===
In 2012, Klingenberg signed with Swedish club, Tyresö. During her time with Tyresö she won the 2012 Damallsvenskan.

=== NWSL, 2013 ===
After the WPS folded, the National Women's Soccer League was created with support from the US, Canada, and Mexico.

=== Houston Dash, 2014–2015 ===
On January 10, 2014, it was announced that the Houston Dash had selected Klingenberg with the sixth pick in the 2014 NWSL Expansion Draft. She finished UEFA Women's Champions League with Tyresӧ FF, before joining the Dash mid-season. She left in October 2015 after making nineteen appearances for the club.

=== Portland Thorns, 2016–2024 ===
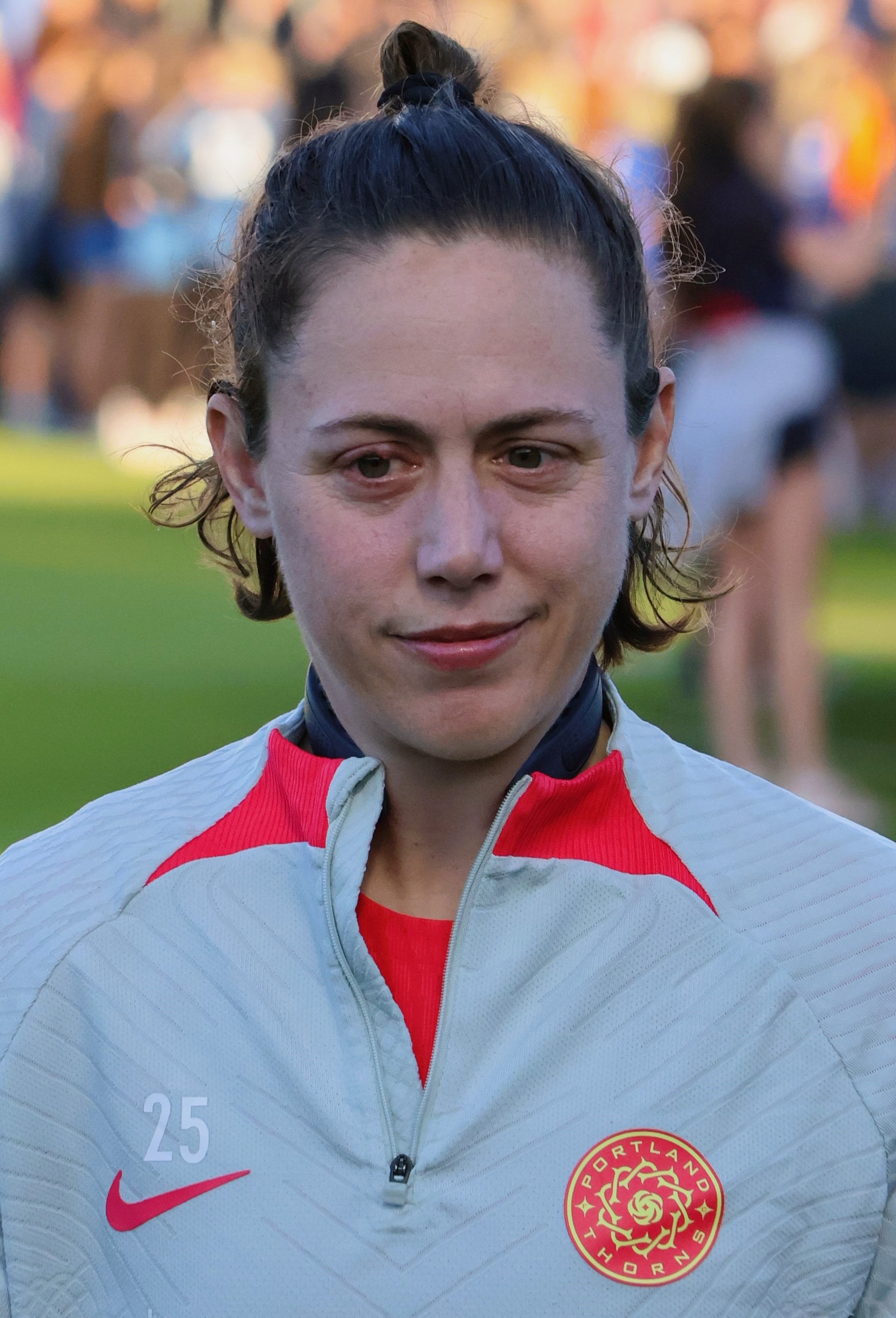
Klingenberg with the Portland Thorns in 2024

In October 2015, Klingenberg was part of a pingpong trade that had her join the Seattle Reign as she was traded by Houston Dash for Amber Brooks and a conditional selection in the 2017 NWSL College Draft, then traded to the NWSL 2016 expansion team Orlando, who then traded her to the Portland Thorns FC for Alex Morgan and other considerations.

Kilngenberg was a regular starter for the Thorns during a period of sustained success. The team won the 2016 and 2021 NWSL Shields, the 2017 and 2022 NWSL Championships, the 2021 NWSL Challenge Cup, the 2021 Women's International Champions Cup, and the 2020 Fall Series, played instead of the regular season during the COVID-19 pandemic. Klingenberg also became a team leader, known for her fiery pregame speeches.

On December 30, 2024, Klingenberg announced that she had departed the club, and on June 18, 2025 she announced her retirement.

On July 28, 2026, the Thorns announced that Klingenberg would be recognized for her service to both the Thorns and USWNT in a pre-match ceremony at their stadium, Providence Park.

== International career ==
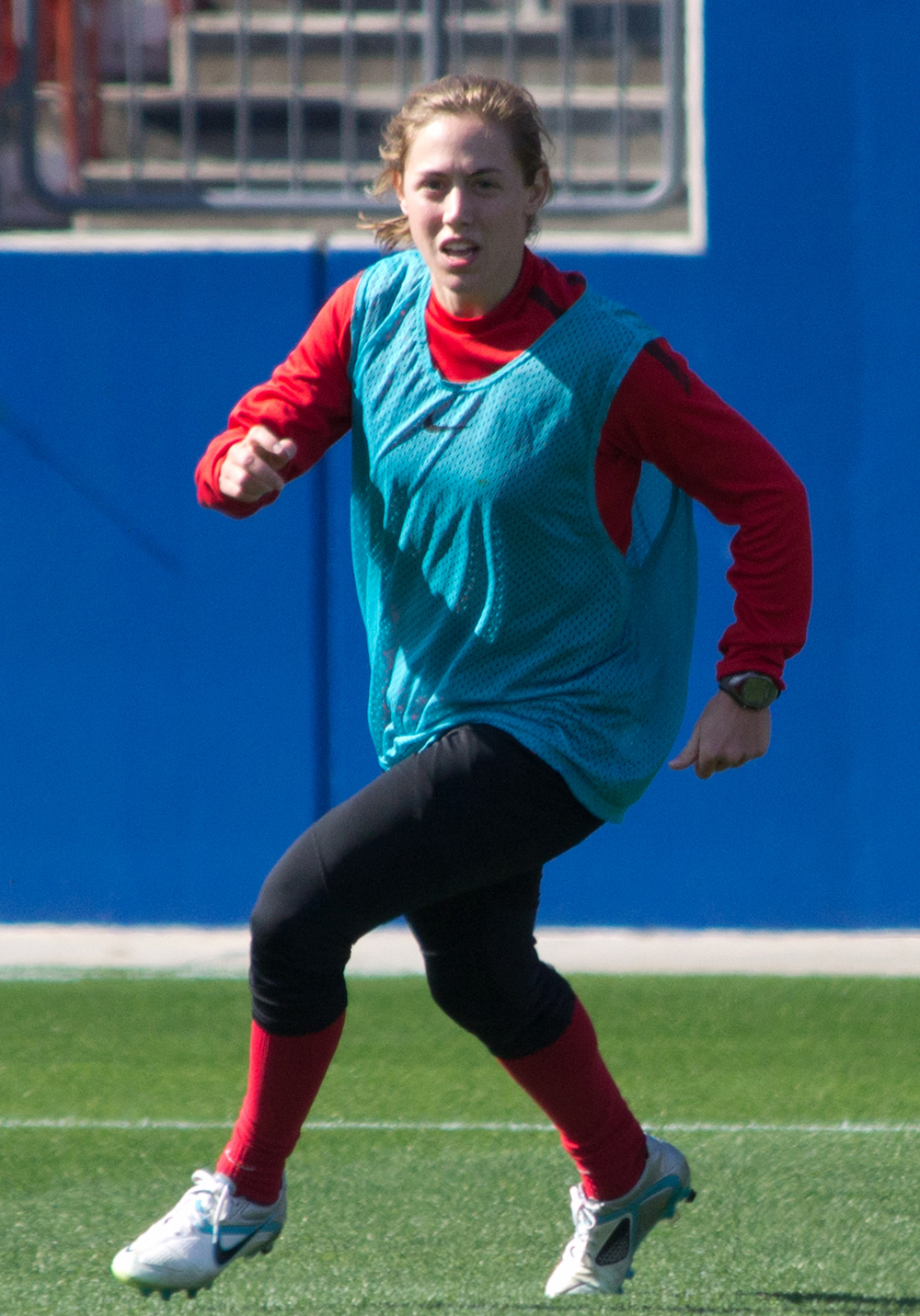
Klingenberg training with USWNT in 2012

Klingenberg played for the United States women's national soccer team (USWNT) at the U-16, U-17, U-20 and U-23 levels. She received her first call-up to the senior squad for the 2011 Four Nations Tournament and earned her first two caps during the event. She was named an alternate for the 2012 Summer Olympics. In March 2013, she was named to the senior team roster by USWNT coach, Tom Sermanni, for upcoming exhibition matches against Germany and the Netherlands. Klingenberg made her debut for senior team on January 23, 2011, at the Four Nations Tournament against Canada, coming in as a substitute at seventy-eighth minute. She also played in the 2015 FIFA Women's World Cup, starting every match and helping the team win the tournament. In part because of her performance there, she was named to the FIFA FIFPro World XI 2015.

Despite seeing extensive playing time during the 2016 Summer Olympics, at which the US was eliminated in a quarterfinal penalty shoot-out against Sweden, Klingenberg would receive sparse minutes throughout 2017 and has not been called up since January 2018.

== Off-field ==
While with the Houston Dash, Klingenberg and teammate Morgan Brian lived with the family of former Houston Rockets coach Jeff Van Gundy during the NWSL season, as part of the Dash's host family program.

In 2018, Klingenberg participated in negotiating image and likeness rights for the United States women's national team for the U.S. Women's National Team Players Association.

In 2019, Klingenberg, along with United States teammates Tobin Heath, Christen Press and Megan Rapinoe started Re-inc, a gender-neutral lifestyle brand.

Klingenberg is in a relationship with former YouTuber and influencer Ingrid Nilsen. The couple live in Brooklyn New York and frequently post on social media together

== In popular culture ==
Klingenberg was featured with her national teammates in the EA Sports' FIFA video game series in FIFA 16, the first time women players were included in the game. She appeared in the series again in FIFA 23, which added NWSL teams to the game.

Following the United States' win at the 2015 FIFA Women's World Cup, Klingenberg and her teammates became the first women's sports team to be honored with a ticker tape parade in New York City. Each player received a key to the city from Mayor Bill de Blasio. In October of the same year, the team was honored by President Barack Obama at the White House.

== Career statistics ==
=== Club ===
As of As of September 3, 2024.

Appearances and goals by club, season and competition
Club	Season	League			Domestic Cup (Note: Includes the Svenska Cupen)		Other (Note: Includes the NWSL Challenge Cup and NWSL Fall Series)		Total	
Club	Season	Division	Apps	Goals	Apps	Goals	Apps	Goals	Apps	Goals
magicJack	2011	WPS	2	0	—		—		2	0
Boston Breakers	2011	WPS	11	1	—		—		11	1
Western New York Flash	2012	WPSL	3	2	—		—		3	2
Western New York Flash	Total		16	3	—		—		16	3
Tyresö	2012	Damallsvenskan	8	1	2	0	—		10	1
Tyresö	2013	Damallsvenskan	20	1	1	0	1 (Note: One appearance in Svenska Supercupen)	0	22	1
Tyresö	2014	Damallsvenskan	4	0	2	0	—		6	0
Tyresö	Total		32	2	5	0	1	0	38	2
Houston Dash	2014	NWSL	7	0	—		—		7	0
Houston Dash	2015	NWSL	12	0	—		—		12	0
Houston Dash	Total		19	0	—		—		19	0
Portland Thorns	2016	NWSL	14	0	—		—		14	0
Portland Thorns	2017	NWSL	23	0	—		—		23	0
Portland Thorns	2018	NWSL	20	0	—		—		20	0
Portland Thorns	2019	NWSL	23	0	—		—		23	0
Portland Thorns	2020	NWSL	—		—		9	0	9	0
Portland Thorns	2021	NWSL	22	0	—		5	0	27	0
Portland Thorns	2022	NWSL	17	0	—		5	0	20	0
Portland Thorns	2023	NWSL	21	0	—		5	0	26	0
Portland Thorns	2024	NWSL	11	0	—		—		11	0
Portland Thorns	Total		151	0	—		24	0	175	0
Career total			218	5	5	0	25	0	248	5

=== International ===
Scores and results list United States's goal tally first, score column indicates score after each Klingenberg goal.

List of international goals scored by Meghan Klingenberg
No.	Date	Venue	Opponent	Score	Result	Competition	Ref.
1	October 20, 2014	Washington, D.C.	Haiti	3–0	6–0	2014 CONCACAF Women's Championship	
2	April 4, 2015	St. Louis	New Zealand	1–0	4–0	Friendly	
3	August 16, 2015	Pittsburgh	Costa Rica	7–0	8–0	Friendly	

== Honors ==
As of May 18, 2023.

North Carolina Tar Heels

- NCAA Division I women's soccer tournament: 2008, 2009

Western New York Flash

- Women's Premier Soccer League Elite: 2012

Tyresö

- Damallsvenskan: 2012

Portland Thorns FC

- NWSL Shield: 2016, 2021
- NWSL Championship: 2017, 2022
- NWSL Community Shield: 2020
- NWSL Challenge Cup: 2021
- International Champions Cup: 2021

United States

- CONCACAF Women's Championship: 2014
- Algarve Cup: 2015
- FIFA Women's World Cup: 2015
- CONCACAF Women's Olympic Qualifying Tournament: 2016
- SheBelieves Cup: 2016

Individual

- NWSL Second XI: 2017, 2021
- FIFPro: FIFA FIFPro World XI 2015
