= Tobin Heath =

American soccer player (born 1988)

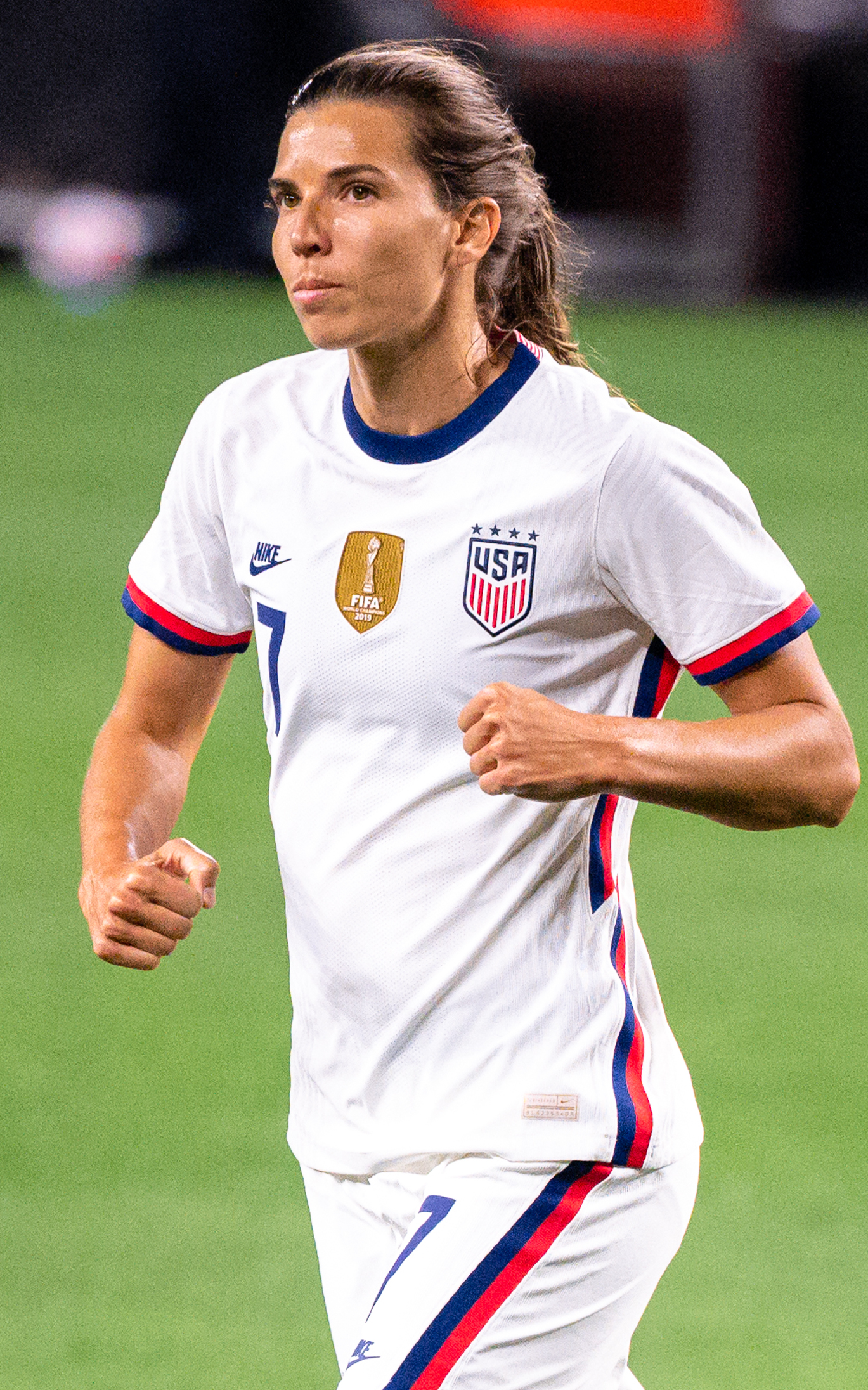
- Heath with the United States women's national soccer team in September 2021

Personal information
- Full name: Tobin Powell Heath
- Date of birth: May 29, 1988 (age 38)
- Place of birth: Morristown, New Jersey, U.S.
- Height: 5 ft 6 in (1.68 m)
- Positions: Winger; forward

College career
Years	Team	Apps	(Gls)
2006–2009	North Carolina Tar Heels	93	(19)

Senior career*
Years	Team	Apps	(Gls)
2004–2006	New Jersey Wildcats	7	(1)
2007	Hudson Valley Quickstrike Lady Blues	5	(5)
2009	Pali Blues	6	(1)
2010	Atlanta Beat	3	(0)
2011	Sky Blue FC	12	(0)
2012	New York Fury	1	(0)
2013–2014	Paris Saint-Germain	15	(4)
2013–2020	Portland Thorns	70	(12)
2020–2021	Manchester United	8	(4)
2021–2022	Arsenal	9	(2)
2022	OL Reign	5	(1)
2026	Portland Thorns	0	(0)
Total		126	(24)

International career^{‡}
2008–2021	United States	181	(36)
Medal record
Representing United States
FIFA Women's World Cup
Winner	2015 Canada
Winner	2019 France
Runner-up	2011 Germany
Olympics
Gold medal – first place	2008 Beijing
Gold medal – first place	2012 London
Bronze medal – third place	2020 Tokyo
Pan American Games
Silver medal – second place	2007 Rio de Janeiro
- * Club domestic league appearances and goals as of July 17, 2022 ‡ National team caps and goals as of October 26, 2021

Tobin Powell Heath (born May 29, 1988) is an American former professional soccer player and entrepreneur. Playing primarily as a forward and midfielder for the United States national team, she won gold at the 2008 Beijing Summer Olympics, 2012 London Summer Olympics, 2015 FIFA Women's World Cup, and 2019 FIFA Women's World Cup as well as silver at the 2011 FIFA Women's World Cup and bronze at the 2020 Tokyo Summer Olympics. She was described as "perhaps the USA's most skillful player" by the United States Soccer Federation, and was named U.S. Soccer Athlete of the Year in 2016 and U.S. Soccer Young Female Athlete of the Year in 2009.

Heath won two NWSL Championships with her team Portland Thorns in the National Women's Soccer League (NWSL), and last played in 2022 for OL Reign. She played for Manchester United and Arsenal in the English FA Women's Super League as well as Paris Saint-Germain in France. Before the formation of the NWSL, she played for the Atlanta Beat and Sky Blue FC in the Women's Professional Soccer (WPS) league. She won three Division I national college championships from 2006-09 with the University of North Carolina.

In 2019, Heath co-founded a lifestyle brand, RE—INC, with fellow athletes Christen Press, Megan Rapinoe, and Meghan Klingenberg. She co-hosts the podcast, The RE—CAP Show, with Christen Press.

In 2020, she was named to the FIFA FIFPro Women's World11.

Heath announced her retirement in July 2025, three years after her final professional game.

In August 2026, the Portland Thorns announced that they signed Tobin Heath to a one day contract so she could officially retire as a Thorns player. Her retirement celebration was set for August 22nd before the Thorns’ game against Denver Summit FC.

== Early life and education ==
Heath was born in Morristown, New Jersey, to parents Jeff and Cindy Heath. She grew up in Basking Ridge, New Jersey. Heath has a younger brother, Jeffrey, and two older sisters, Perry and Katie, who are active in Athletes in Action and Champions for Christ. Heath started playing soccer at the age of 4 in the back of a YMCA. She has described herself as a proud and devout follower of the Christian faith and is very close to her family.

Heath graduated from Ridge High School in Basking Ridge in 2006, where she played soccer for three years. She also played for the 2003 Club National Champion PDA Wildcats team. Heath was ranked as the No. 2 recruit in the nation in the Class of 2006 by Soccer Buzz magazine and was named to the Parade Magazine All-America team in 2005.

=== North Carolina Tar Heels ===
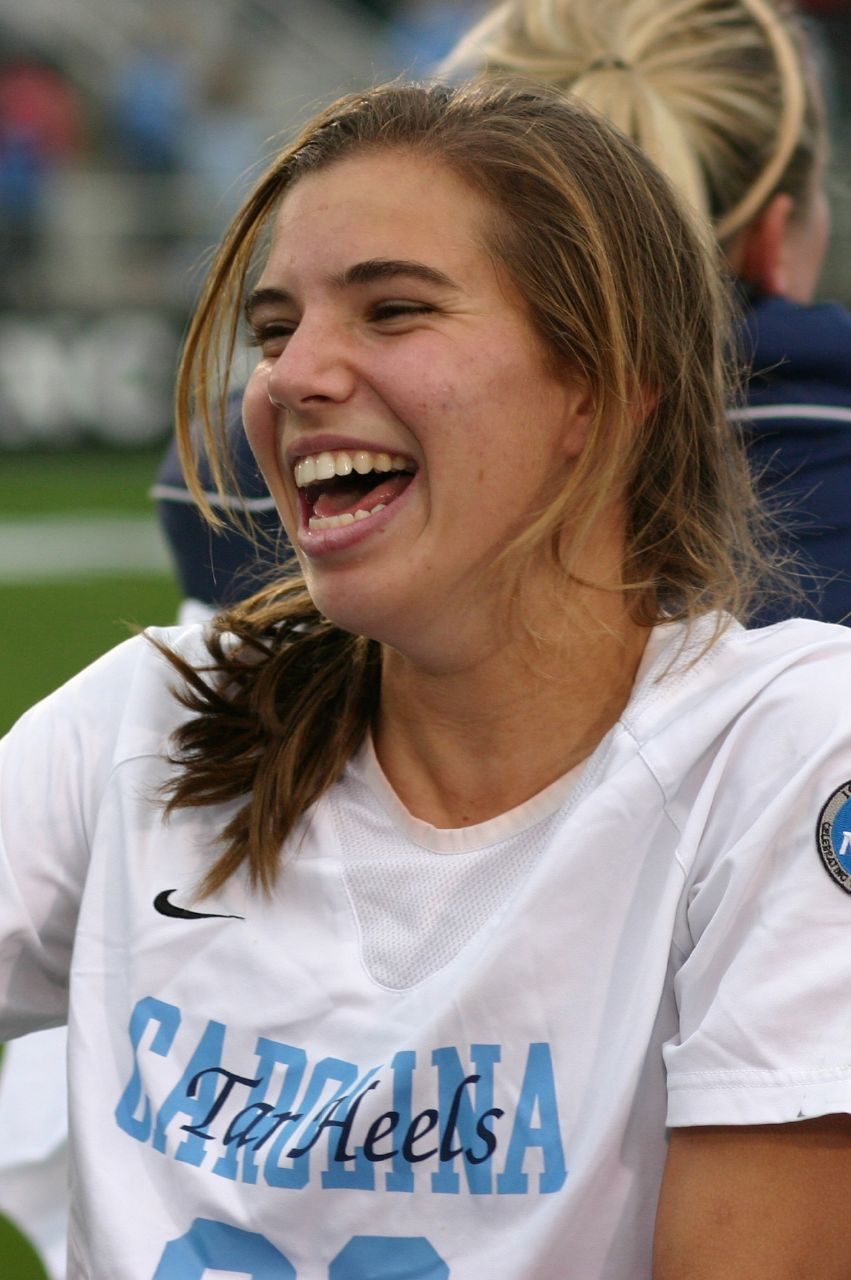
Heath after the National Championship game at SAS Soccer Park in Cary, North Carolina, on December 3, 2006

Heath committed to attend the University of North Carolina (UNC) when she was due to begin her junior year at high school. She did not play soccer in her senior year, instead deciding to train with boys. In her consensus freshman year in 2006 with the Tar Heels, she was part of the All-America 2006 national championship team and made 23 appearances at left midfield (22 starts), scoring four goals and assisting nine. As a sophomore, she scored two goals, assisting another five, and was named to the First-Team NSCAA All-American and First-Team All-ACC (Atlantic Coast Conference). As a junior, she scored eight goals with eight assists, helping UNC to a 25–1–2 record and the NCAA title.

As a senior at UNC, she was involved in fifteen Tar Heels goals, scoring five and assisting ten. The team compiled a record of 23–3–1 and recorded 1–0 victories in both the NCAA semi-final and the championship game. She was named to the NCAA All-Tournament Team and also the first runner-up for the MAC Hermann Trophy, given to the college soccer's top player.

Overall, Heath helped lead UNC to NCAA Division I Women's Soccer Championship titles in 2006, 2008 and 2009 and four straight Atlantic Coast Conference titles. UNC soccer coach Anson Dorrance notes that Heath preferred to nutmeg opposing players rather than dribble the ball around them.

== Club career ==
=== USL W-League (2004–2009) ===
From 2004 to 2006 Heath played with the New Jersey Wildcats, then known as the PSA Wildcats, where she helped the team win the USL W-League Championship in 2005 and be crowned USL W-League Runners-Up in 2004, after assisting the team in becoming Champions of the USL W-League Northeast Division in 2004, 2005, and 2006. The next year she played for Hudson Valley Quickstrike Lady Blues; the team finished the season second in their division and made it to the 2007 Conference Semifinal. In 2009 she played one season with California's Pali Blues, who won the USL W-League Western Conference title and the W-League Championship title.

=== Women's Professional Soccer (2010–11) ===
In 2010, she was the first overall pick in the Women's Professional Soccer (WPS) 2010 college draft and was selected by the expansion team Atlanta Beat. After suffering an injury to her right ankle in her third appearance for the Beat, she missed the remainder of the 2010 season. She started in all three of her appearances for the club.

On December 10, 2010, Heath, along with Beat teammates Eniola Aluko and Angie Kerr, were traded to Sky Blue FC in return for the fourth and eighth pick in the 2011 WPS Draft as well as future considerations. Heath made twelve appearances for Sky Blue, starting in three games. The team finished fifth during regular season play with 5 wins, 4 draws, and 9 losses.

=== New York Fury (2012) ===
With the folding of WPS in 2012, Heath joined New York Fury of the WPSL Elite League. At the start of the season, she was recovering from an ankle injury. Afterwards, she played one game with New York Fury.

=== Paris Saint-Germain (2013–2014) ===
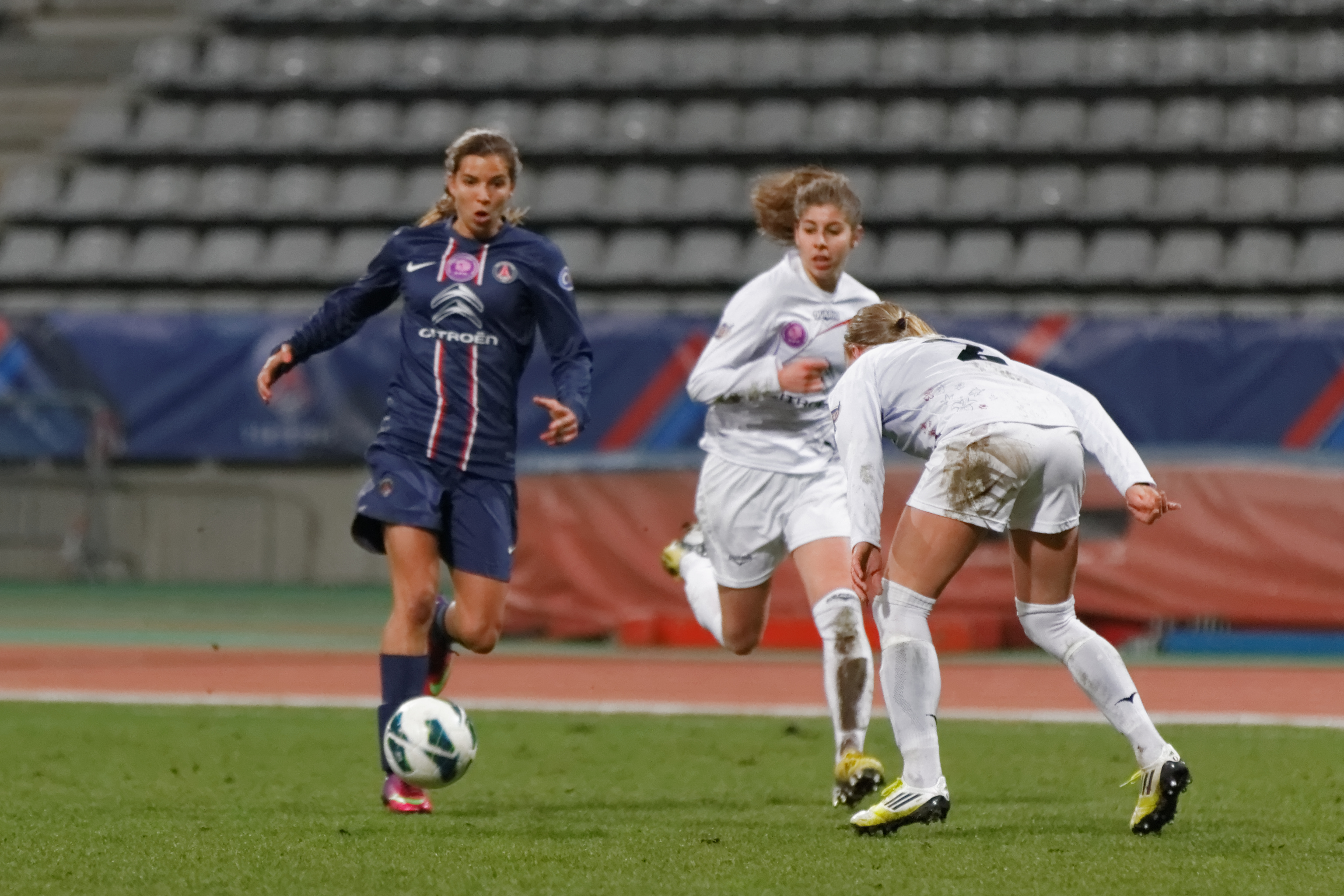
Heath playing for PSG against FCF Juvisy on March 23, 2013

In 2013, Heath signed a six-month contract with Paris Saint-Germain (PSG) in the top-tier French league, Division 1 Féminine, until the end of the season on May 23, 2013. She scored five goals in the twelve appearances she made for the club. Her six-month spell was referred as her education on the Portland Thorns FC website.

Heath returned to PSG from the Portland Thorns in September 2013 until June 2014, after she had a sore right foot in the 2013 NWSL Championship. During her second spell with the club, she made seven appearances without scoring.

=== Portland Thorns FC (2013–2020) ===
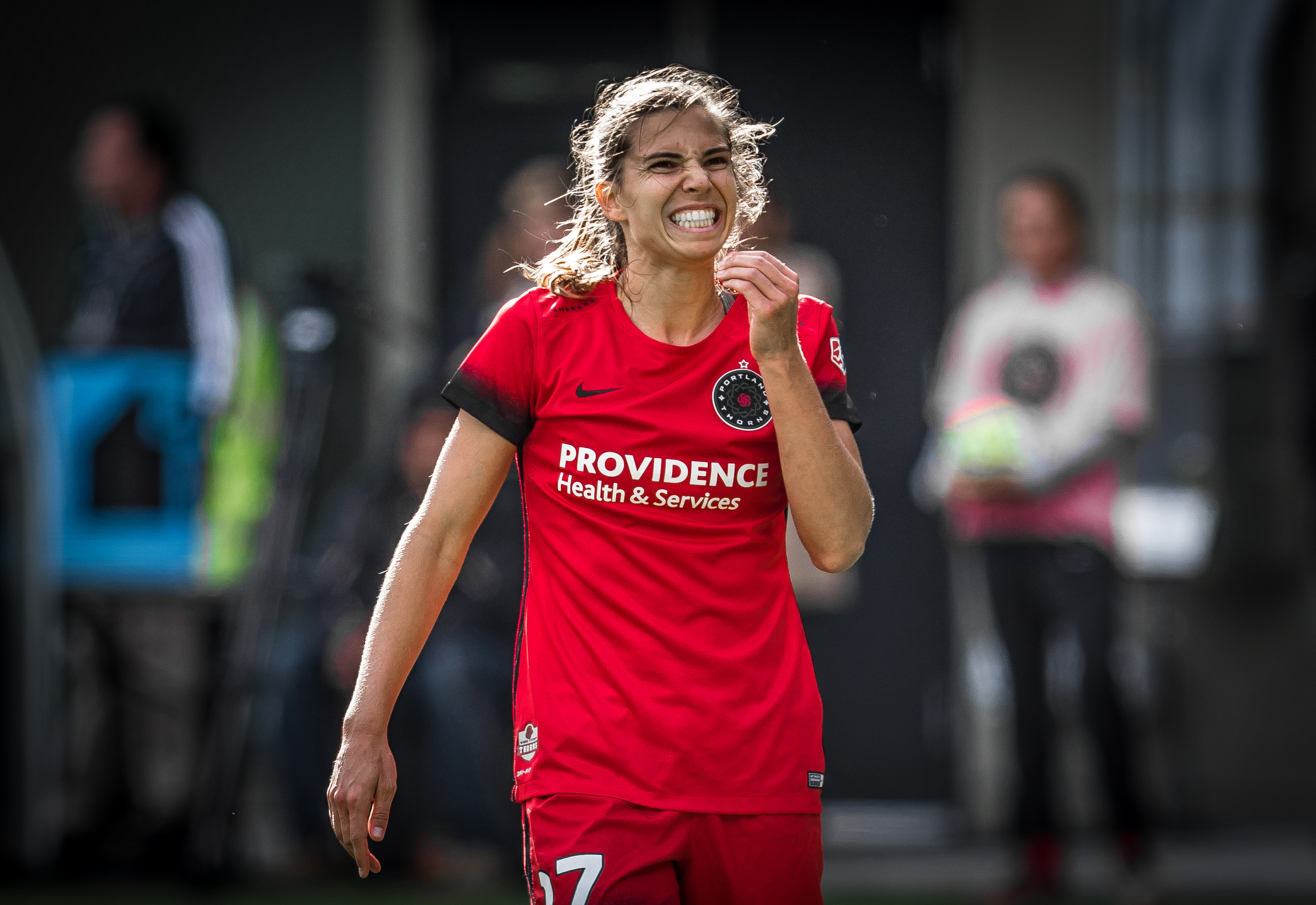
Heath with the Thorns in 2016

The newly established National Women's Soccer League (NWSL) announced on January 11, 2013, that Heath was one of the seven players allocated to the Portland Thorns FC for their initial roster as part of the NWSL Player Allocation. After completing the season with Paris-Saint Germain, she joined the Thorns in July 2013, helping them attain a third-place finish in the NWSL. The Thorns won the 2013 NWSL Championship after defeating the Western New York Flash 2–0, with Heath scoring the game-winning goal from a direct free kick; she later revealed that she had a broken foot during this game. She was voted the Most Valuable Player (MVP) of the championship game.

During the beginning of the 2016 NWSL season, Heath notched five assists in five games – two of them in a 2–1 victory over the Orlando Pride – and earned the title of NWSL Player of the Month for April. She scored her first goal of the 2016 season against the Washington Spirit, one voted NWSL goal of the week by fans. She was also named NWSL Player of the Week for week 6. Heath notched her 10th assist of the season in Portland's final game against Sky Blue FC, breaking the NWSL's previous record of 9 assists by a single player in one regular season. The record still stands. She was named the team's captain when Christine Sinclair was injured during the season.

Heath missed the majority of the 2017 NWSL season while nursing a lingering back injury which kept her out of play. It was first described as a minor injury that was expected to result in a short spell out of play, with an estimated return date listed as May 27 against the Boston Breakers. The back injury lasted longer than initially thought, so she was sent to Los Angeles and was treated by her coaching staff. Heath was removed from the disabled list and added to the active roster on August 28. It was announced in May that she would take up a role within the team's Development Academy as Youth Technical Director. Heath returned in time for end of the season; her NWSL season debut was on September 23 vs Orlando Pride at the 60th minute. She made her first start on October 7 against the same team in the NWSL Championship Semi-final. She helped her team reach the final of the play-offs with an assist for Emily Sonnett in a 4–1 win, and participated in a 1–0 win over North Carolina Courage to win the NWSL Championship.

Heath suffered an ankle injury during the 2017 NWSL Championship game and underwent surgery at the beginning of 2018. She missed the first four games of the 2018 NWSL season as she was still recovering from surgery. Heath returned to the Thorns lineup on April 28 against the Utah Royals, where she entered the game in the 57th minute and scored a goal 10 minutes later. The game ended in a 1–1 draw. Heath scored 7 goals and added 7 assists during the regular season. She was named to the NWSL Team of the Month for August. Heath scored another goal in Portland's 2–1 win over the Seattle Reign in the semi-final, setting up a re-match with the North Carolina Courage in the final. Portland was defeated by the Courage 3–0 in the final. Heath was named one of five nominees for NWSL Most Valuable Player; her Thorns teammate Lindsey Horan won the award. Heath was named to the 2018 NWSL Best XI.

Heath started the 2019 season by winning both the NWSL Goal of the Week and Player of the Week for the first week of play.

With the 2020 season disrupted by the COVID-19 pandemic, Heath elected not to participate in the 2020 NWSL Challenge Cup.

On November 12, 2020, having left Heath unprotected, Portland lost her NWSL rights to Racing Louisville FC during the 2020 NWSL Expansion Draft.

=== Manchester United (2020–2021) ===
On September 9, 2020, Manchester United of the FA Women's Super League announced it had signed Heath, along with her national teammate Christen Press, to one-year contracts. She made her debut on October 4 as a 70th minute substitute in a 3–0 victory over Brighton & Hove Albion, registering an assist. She scored her first goal for the club on October 18 as part of a 4–2 WSL victory away to West Ham United. On November 14, Heath scored her first Manchester derby goal in a 2–2 league draw with Manchester City, helping start United's comeback from 0–2 down. On December 11, 2020, Heath was named WSL Player of the Month for November.

On December 17, 2020, Heath, was named to FIFA FIFPro Women's World11 at The Best FIFA Football Awards 2020.

Having been sidelined by an ankle injury since January 2021, Heath, it was announced in April, had since suffered a further knee injury and had returned to the United States to try and rehab in time for the summer's Olympic Games, prematurely ending her debut season with United. On June 24, the club announced Heath would leave upon the expiry of her contract at the end of the month.

=== Arsenal (2021–2022) ===
On September 3, 2021, Heath signed for Arsenal. She made her debut as a substitute at home against Manchester City on September 26, 2021, during Arsenal's 5–0 victory.

Having been ruled out for the conclusion of the season with a minor hamstring injury sustained in training, Heath and Arsenal mutually agreed to terminate her contract early on April 28, 2022.

=== OL Reign (2022) ===
On June 16, 2022, Heath returned to the NWSL and signed with OL Reign. With OL Reign, Heath only played a few matches due to injuries and had a season ending knee surgery in September. At the end of the season, her contract was not renewed and she became a free agent.

On July 10, 2025, she announced her retirement, saying her prior injuries had been career-ending.

== International career ==
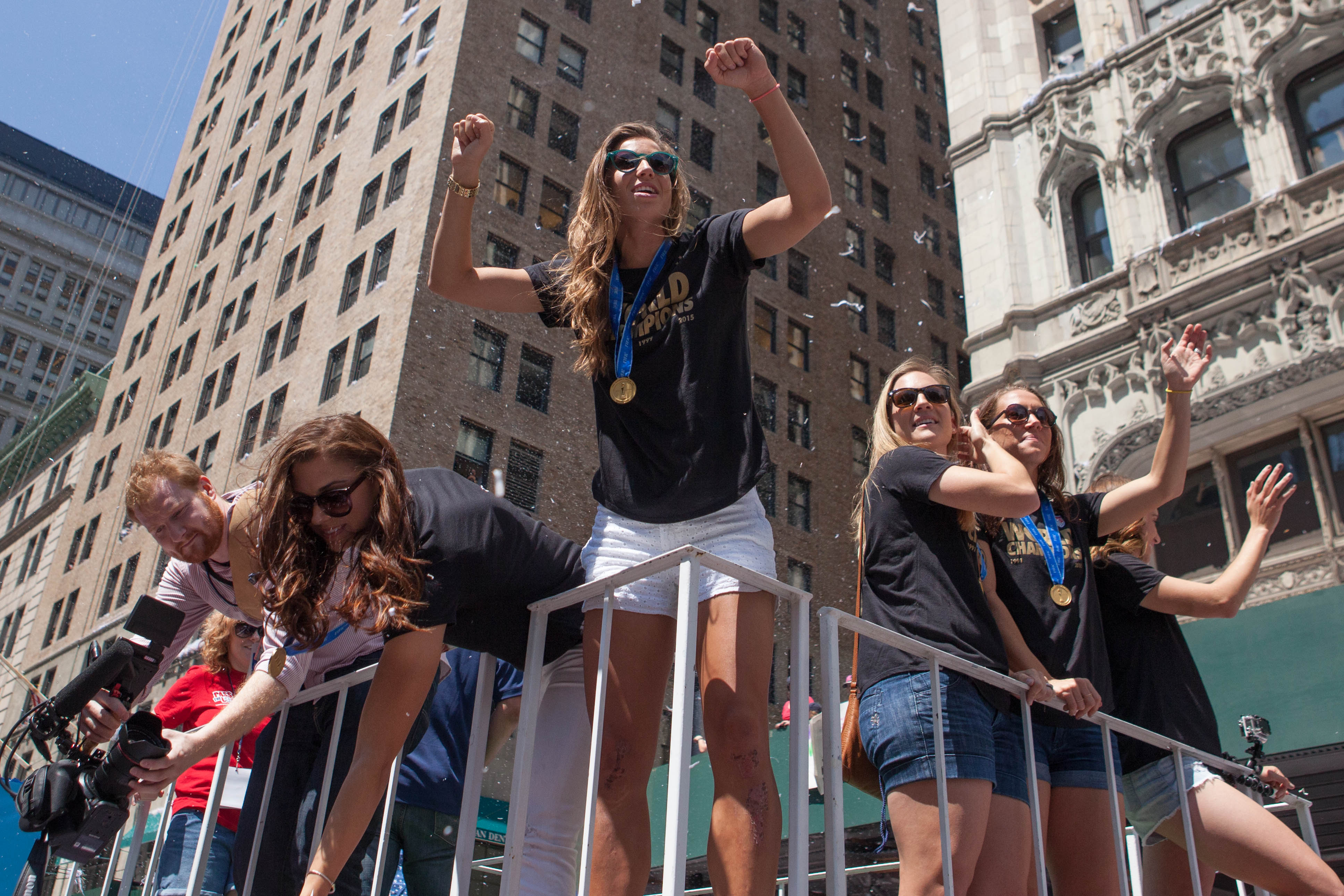
Heath (center) celebrating the 2015 FIFA Women's World Cup win at the ticker-tape victory parade in New York City, July 2015

=== Youth national teams ===
Heath played on several youth national teams – including the U-16s in 2003–2004 and the U-17s in 2004–05. Heath was a standout at the 2006 FIFA U-20 Women's World Championship in Russia, despite being one of the last players chosen for the World Cup roster. In total Heath made 24 appearances for the United States under-20s in 2006, scoring five goals. Heath was part of the silver medal-winning USA U-20 Women's team at the 2007 Pan American Games in Brazil, where she was in the starting lineup for the championship game.

=== Senior national team debut, 2008 ===
Heath made her first appearance for the senior national team (USWNT) on January 18, 2008, against Finland in the Four Nations Tournament in China. She was named to the U.S. roster for 2008 Summer Olympics at the age of 20. She earned three caps during the tournament as the U.S. went on to win the gold medal. Heath was one of three college athletes who represented the U.S. at the 2008 Olympics. In 2008, Heath earned 17 caps and scored two goals. Her first international goal came against China at the 2008 Algarve Cup.

=== 2009–2010 ===
Heath was named the 2009 U.S. Soccer Young Female Athlete of the Year and earned two more caps for the USWNT in 2009, with both appearances coming against Canada in July. She did not play for the U.S. in 2010 due to an illness and a major ankle injury suffered during the WPS season which required surgery.

=== 2011 FIFA Women's World Cup ===
Heath made her FIFA Women's World Cup debut at the age of 23 during the 2011 FIFA Women's World Cup in Germany. Her first appearance came in the second half of the U.S.'s group-stage match against Colombia. Heath made four appearances during the World Cup, with her final three appearances coming in the knockout round. In the World Cup final, Heath entered the game in the 116th minute of extra time as a substitute for Megan Rapinoe. The game finished tied 2–2 and went to penalties. Heath was the third U.S. player to take a penalty; her shot was saved by Japanese keeper Ayumi Kaihori and the U.S. lost 3–1 on penalties.

=== 2012 London Olympics ===
Heath was a member of the 2012 U.S. Olympic team and played in all six matches. She started and played the full 90 in four of the six games and recorded three assists during the tournament. Her first assist came against France during the group stage, when she sent a cross to Alex Morgan, who scored the last goal of the match to make the final score 4–2. For her second assist, against Colombia, she played a one-two pass with Abby Wambach, who scored the second goal in a 3–0 win. Her final assist of the tournament came in the quarter-finals against New Zealand in the 87th minute, when she provided a long ball down the left flank to Sydney Leroux, who scored through the legs of the goalkeeper Jenny Bindon, sealing the match with a final score of 2–0.

=== 2015 FIFA Women's World Cup ===
Heath was a regular starter on the USWNT at the 2015 FIFA Women's World Cup in Canada, starting five of the U.S.'s seven games. In the World Cup Final, Heath scored in the 54th minute on an assist from Morgan Brian. The U.S. won the World Cup, defeating Japan 5–2.

=== 2016 Rio Olympics ===
Heath scored two goals during 2016 Olympic qualifying, helping the United States to qualify for the 2016 Summer Olympics.

Heath participated in her third Olympic Games in 2016. She appeared in three games for the U.S. and recorded two assists. The U.S. team was eliminated by Sweden on penalties in the quarter-finals. Heath was named NWSL Olympics Player of Match Day 1 and 2 in fan voting.

In 2016 Heath appeared in 20 games for the U.S., scoring 6 goals and adding 8 assists. Heath was named 2016 U.S. Soccer Female Player of the Year after receiving 40% of the vote, ahead of Crystal Dunn with 34%.

=== 2017 ===
After appearing in all three games at the 2017 SheBelieves Cup, Heath would only make one more appearance for the U.S. in 2017 due to a nagging back injury and an ankle injury suffered in the 2017 NWSL Championship game.

=== 2018 ===
After undergoing ankle surgery in January 2018, Heath made her return to the field on June 12 in a friendly against China, where she scored the match-winner in a 2–1 victory. At the 2018 Tournament of Nations Heath scored in the final game against Brazil, helping the U.S. to a 4–1 victory. The U.S. won the tournament by goal difference over Australia.

Heath scored 4 goals at the 2018 CONCACAF Women's Championship, including two goals in a semi-final match against Jamaica. The U.S. won that game 6–0 and clinched a spot in the 2019 FIFA Women's World Cup. She was named to the Best XI for the CONCACAF Women's Championship.

Heath finished 2018 with 7 goals and 6 assists while appearing in only 10 games. She was one of five nominees for the 2018 U.S. Female Player of the Year; Alex Morgan won the award.

=== 2019 FIFA Women's World Cup ===
In May 2019, Heath was named to the squad for the 2019 FIFA Women's World Cup. She started six of the seven matches as the United States became only the second nation after Germany in 2007 to successfully defend their title.

== Career statistics ==
=== Club summary ===
As of July 30, 2022

Appearances and goals by club, season and competition
Club	Season	League			National Cup (Note: Includes the Coupe de France and FA Cup)		League Cup (Note: Includes the NWSL Playoffs, FA League Cup and NWSL Challenge Cup)		Continental (Note: Includes the UEFA Champions League)		Total	
Club	Season	Division	Apps	Goals	Apps	Goals	Apps	Goals	Apps	Goals	Apps	Goals
Pali Blues	2009	USL W-League	6	1	—		0	0	—		6	1
Atlanta Beat	2010	WPS	3	0	—		—		—		3	0
Sky Blue FC	2011	WPS	12	0	—		—		—		12	0
New York Fury	2012	WPSL Elite	1	0	—		0	0	—		1	0
Paris Saint-Germain	2012–13	D1F	8	4	4	1	—		—		12	5
Paris Saint-Germain	2013–14	D1F	7	0	2	0	—		2	0	11	0
Paris Saint-Germain	Total		15	4	6	1	0	0	2	0	23	5
Portland Thorns	2013	NWSL	7	0	—		2	2	—		9	2
Portland Thorns	2014	NWSL	5	0	—		1	0	—		6	0
Portland Thorns	2015	NWSL	12	1	—		—		—		12	1
Portland Thorns	2016	NWSL	14	1	—		1	0	—		15	1
Portland Thorns	2017	NWSL	2	0	—		2	0	—		4	0
Portland Thorns	2018	NWSL	17	7	—		2	1	—		19	8
Portland Thorns	2019	NWSL	13	3	—		1	0	—		14	3
Portland Thorns	Total		70	12	0	0	9	3	0	0	79	15
Manchester United	2020–21	FA WSL	8	4	0	0	3	0	—		11	4
Arsenal	2021–22	FA WSL	9	2	3 (Note: Includes one appearance in the delayed 2020–21 FA Cup)	0	1	0	4	1	17	3
OL Reign	2022	NWSL	2	1	0	0	0	0	—		5	1
Career total			126	24	9	1	13	3	6	1	159	29

=== International goals ===
As of match played September 16, 2021. United States score listed first, score column indicates score after each Heath goal.

No.	Date	Venue	Opponent	Score	Result	Competition
1	March 5, 2008	Municipal Stadium, Albufeira, Portugal	China	2–0	4–0	2008 Algarve Cup
2	April 4, 2008	Estadio Olímpico Benito Juárez, Juárez, Mexico	Jamaica	6–0	6–0	2008 Olympic qualifying
3	November 19, 2011	University of Phoenix Stadium, Glendale, United States	Sweden	1–1	1–1	Friendly
4	January 20, 2012	BC Place, Vancouver, Canada	Dominican Republic	6–0	14–0	2012 Olympic qualifying
5	January 27, 2012	BC Place, Vancouver, Canada	Costa Rica	1–0	3–0	2012 Olympic qualifying
6	June 16, 2012	Örjans Vall, Halmstad, Sweden	Sweden	3–1	3–1	2012 Sweden Invitational
7	October 23, 2012	Rentschler Field, East Hartford, United States	Germany	2–1	2–2	Friendly
8	April 9, 2013	Cars Jeans Stadion, The Hague, Netherlands	Netherlands	1–0	3–1	Friendly
9	September 18, 2014	Sahlen's Stadium, Rochester, United States	Mexico	3–0	4–0	Friendly
10	October 17, 2014	Toyota Park, Bridgeview, United States	Guatemala	1–0	5–0	2014 CONCACAF Championship
11	October 17, 2014	Toyota Park, Bridgeview, United States	Guatemala	3–0	5–0	2014 CONCACAF Championship
12	July 5, 2015	BC Place, Vancouver, Canada	Japan	5–2	5–2	2015 FIFA World Cup
13	February 19, 2016	BBVA Compass Stadium, Houston, United States	Trinidad and Tobago	1–0	5–0	2016 Olympic Qualifying
14	February 21, 2016	BBVA Compass Stadium, Houston, United States	Canada	2–0	2–0	2016 Olympic Qualifying
15	April 6, 2016	Rentschler Field, East Hartford, United States	Colombia	5–0	7–0	Friendly
16	September 15, 2016	Mapfre Stadium, Columbus, United States	Thailand	4–0	9–0	Friendly
17	October 19, 2016	Rio Tinto Stadium, Sandy, United States	Switzerland	2–0	4–0	Friendly
18	November 10, 2016	Avaya Stadium, San Jose, United States	Romania	2–0	8–1	Friendly
19	June 12, 2018	FirstEnergy Stadium, Cleveland, United States	China	2–1	2–1	Friendly
20	August 2, 2018	Toyota Park, Bridgeview, United States	Brazil	3–1	4–1	2018 Tournament of Nations
21	September 4, 2018	Avaya Stadium, San Jose, United States	Chile	2–0	4–0	Friendly
22	October 4, 2018	Sahlen's Stadium, Cary, United States	Mexico	4–0	6–0	2018 CONCACAF Championship
23	October 10, 2018	Sahlen's Stadium, Cary, United States	Trinidad and Tobago	7–0	7–0	2018 CONCACAF Championship
24	October 14, 2018	Toyota Stadium, Frisco, United States	Jamaica	1–0	7–0	2018 CONCACAF Championship
25	October 14, 2018	Toyota Stadium, Frisco, United States	Jamaica	4–0	7–0	2018 CONCACAF Championship
26	March 2, 2019	Nissan Stadium, Nashville, United States	England	2–2	2–2	2019 SheBelieves Cup
27	March 5, 2019	Raymond James Stadium, Tampa, United States	Brazil	1–0	1–0	2019 SheBelieves Cup
28	April 4, 2019	Dick's Sporting Goods Park, Commerce City, United States	Australia	2–2	5–3	Friendly
29	May 16, 2019	Busch Stadium, St. Louis, United States	New Zealand	1–0	5–0	Friendly
30	May 26, 2019	Red Bull Arena, Harrison, United States	Mexico	1–0	3–0	Friendly
31	August 3, 2019	Rose Bowl, Pasadena, United States	Republic of Ireland	1–0	3–0	Friendly
32	August 29, 2019	Lincoln Financial Field, Philadelphia, United States	Portugal	1–0	4–0	Friendly
33	January 31, 2020	BBVA Stadium, Houston, United States	Panama	7–0	8–0	2020 Olympic qualifying
34	July 1, 2021	Rentschler Field, East Hartford, United States	Mexico	3–0	4–0	Friendly
35	July 5, 2021	Rentschler Field, East Hartford, United States	Mexico	4–0	4–0	Friendly
36	September 16, 2021	FirstEnergy Stadium, Cleveland, United States	Paraguay	9–0	9–0	Friendly

== Honors and awards ==
University of North Carolina

- NCAA Women's Soccer Champions: 2006, 2008, 2009

Portland Thorns

- NWSL Championship: 2013, 2017
- NWSL Shield: 2016

OL Reign

- NWSL Shield: 2022
- The Women's Cup: 2022

United States

- FIFA Women's World Cup: 2015, 2019, runner-up: 2011
- Olympic Gold Medal: 2008, 2012
- Olympic Bronze Medal: 2020
- CONCACAF Women's Championship: 2014, 2018
- CONCACAF Women's Olympic Qualifying Tournament: 2008, 2012, 2016, 2020
- Algarve Cup: 2008, 2011, 2013, 2015
- Four Nations Tournament: 2008, 2011
- She Believes Cup: 2016; 2020
- Tournament of Nations: 2018

Individual

- FIFA FIFPro Women's World11: 2020
- U.S. Soccer Female Athlete of the Year: 2016
- NWSL Best XI: 2016, 2018, 2019
- NWSL Championship Most Valuable Player: 2013
- FA Women's Super League Player of the Month: November 2020
- U.S. Soccer Young Female Athlete of the Year: 2009
- IFFHS CONCACAF Woman Team of the Decade 2011–2020

== Personal life ==
Heath was named in homage to her great-grandmother, with her parents utilizing her surname as Heath's first name. Aside from soccer, Heath has said she enjoys playing multiple sports, such as tennis and surfing, and enjoys being outside when given the time and opportunity.

Heath is married to United States women's national soccer team and Manchester United W.F.C. teammate Christen Press, whom she has been in a relationship with since 2015.

In June 2022, Heath shared a photo of a painting on her Instagram titled Out Now, which depicted the words "I am gay" spelled out in multi-colored all caps block letters.

In 2019, Heath co-founded the company RE—INC, alongside Press, Megan Rapinoe, and Meghan Klingenberg.

During the 2023 World Cup, Heath and Christen Press with RE—INC hosted their own twice-weekly World Cup show, the RE—CAP Show. Since then the show has continued to cover women's soccer globally.

Along with Press, Heath is a Global Ambassador for Grassroot Soccer, an adolescent health organization that leverages the power of soccer to equip young people with the life-saving information, services, and mentorship they need to live healthier lives. Heath is also co-chair of the organization's Advisory Board and has visited its soccer-based health programs in South Africa and Zambia.

== In popular culture ==
=== Video games ===
Heath is featured along with her national teammates in the EA Sports' FIFA video game series in FIFA 16, the first time women players were included in the game. In September 2015, she was ranked by EA Sports as the No. 15 women's player in the game.

== See also ==
- List of FIFA Women's World Cup winning players
- List of multiple Olympic gold medalists in one event
- List of Olympic medalists in football
- List of players who have won multiple FIFA Women's World Cups
- List of players who have appeared in multiple FIFA Women's World Cups
- List of Portland Thorns FC players
- List of foreign FA Women's Super League players
- List of University of North Carolina at Chapel Hill alumni
- List of sportswomen
