= Meg Morris =

American soccer player (born 1992)

Personal information
- Full name: Meagan Alexandra Morris
- Date of birth: May 11, 1992 (age 34)
- Place of birth: Montclair, New Jersey, United States
- Height: 5 ft 2 in (1.57 m)
- Position: Midfielder

College career
Years	Team	Apps	(Gls)
2010–2013	North Carolina Tar Heels		

Senior career*
Years	Team	Apps	(Gls)
2014–2015	Sky Blue FC	12	(0)
2016–2018	Portland Thorns FC	8	(1)

International career
2010	United States U-20		
- * Club domestic league appearances and goals as of September 8, 2016

Meagan Alexandra Morris (born May 11, 1992) is an American soccer player from Montclair, New Jersey who played for Portland Thorns FC of the NWSL. Morris was a member of the United States under-20 women's national soccer team, and plays the position of midfielder.

== Early life ==
Morris was born and raised in Montclair, New Jersey.

== College career ==
Morris attended the University of North Carolina from 2010 to 2013 where she was a three-year starter.

== Club career ==
=== Sky Blue FC ===
Morris was signed in April 2014 as a discovery player. She was waived by the club in July 2015 to make room on the roster for Australian national team players returning from the World Cup.

=== Portland Thorns FC ===
The Thorns signed Morris on April 27, 2016. She scored her first professional goal on May 21, 2016, as a substitute against the Washington Spirit. During a match against the Western New York Flash on June 17, 2016, she fractured her hip during play and missed the remainder of the 2016 season and most of the 2017 season while recovering.

== See also ==
- 2010 FIFA U-20 Women's World Cup squads
