= 2019 Portland Thorns FC season =

Portland Thorns FC
2019 season
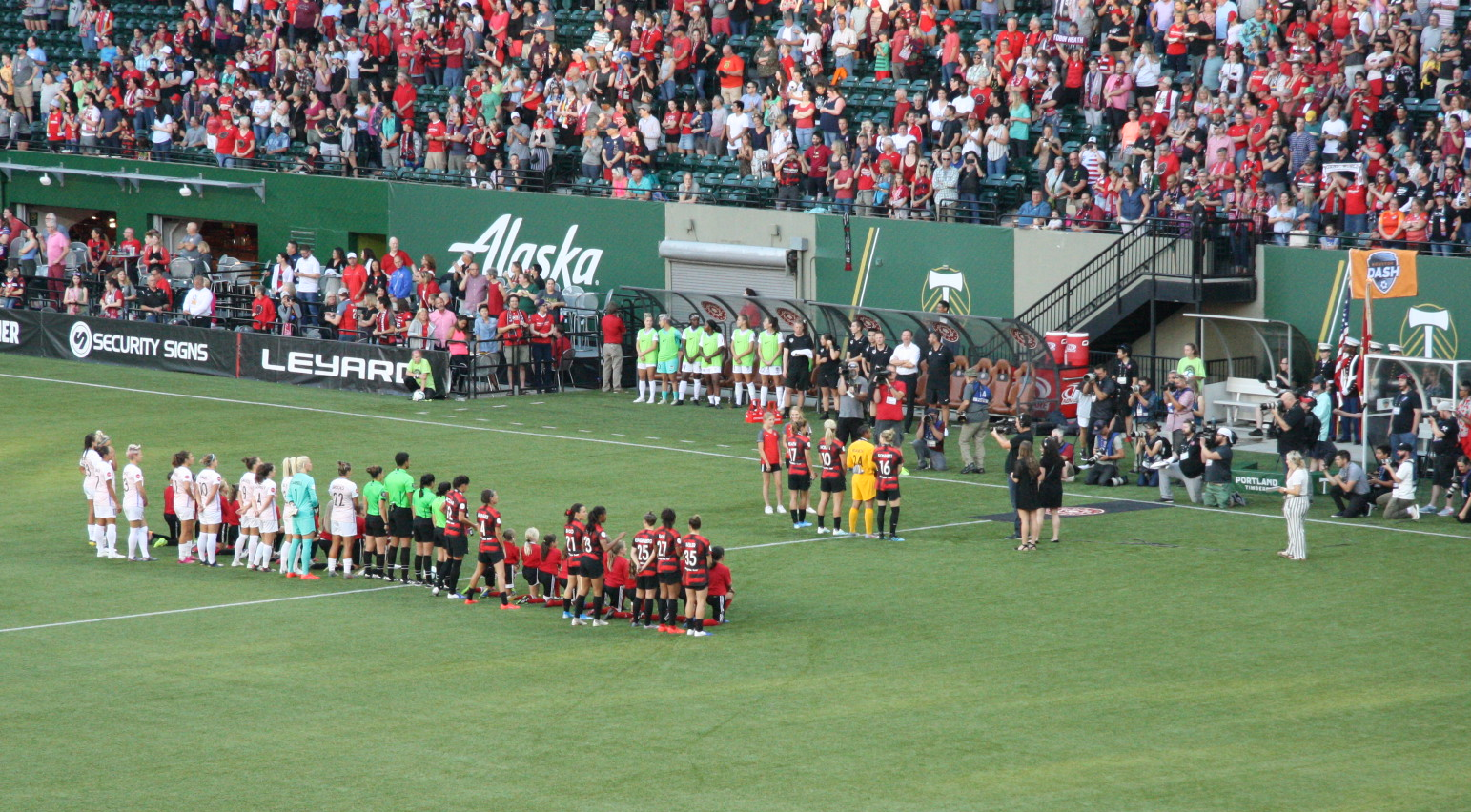
- Several Thorns players were on the U.S. national team that won the 2019 FIFA Women's World Cup. Pictured here, those players greeted the then-record size audience upon their return, prior to a match against the Houston Dash.
- Chairman: Merritt Paulson
- Manager: Mark Parsons
- Stadium: Providence Park; Portland, Oregon
- National Women's Soccer League: 3rd
- NWSL Playoffs: Semifinals (eliminated by Chicago Red Stars)
- Top goalscorer: Christine Sinclair (9 goals), Margaret Purce (8 goals)
- Highest home attendance: 25,218 August 11 vs. North Carolina Courage
- Lowest home attendance: 15,581 June 21 vs. Utah Royals FC
- Average home league attendance: 20,098
- Biggest win: 5–0 (July 24 vs. Houston Dash)
- Biggest defeat: 0–6 (Sep. 11 vs. North Carolina Courage)
Home colours	Away colours

The 2019 Portland Thorns FC season was the team's and the league's seventh season of existence. The Thorns play in the National Women's Soccer League (NWSL), the top division of women's soccer in the United States. Due to construction at Providence Park, the Thorns would start the season with six consecutive away matches.

== Team ==
=== Squad ===
Updated July 28, 2022, referencing same, to add #36 Angela Salem

Updated May 8, 2019 Note: Flags indicate national team as defined under FIFA eligibility rules; some limited exceptions apply. Players may hold more than one non-FIFA nationality.

No.	Pos.	Nation	Player
2	DF	USA	Katherine Reynolds
4	DF	USA	Emily Menges
7	FW	SUI	Ana-Maria Crnogorčević
8	MF	BRA	Andressinha
9	FW	AUS	Caitlin Foord
10	MF	USA	Lindsey Horan
11	MF	ISL	Dagný Brynjarsdóttir
12	FW	CAN	Christine Sinclair
15	DF	AUS	Ellie Carpenter
16	DF	USA	Emily Sonnett
17	MF	USA	Tobin Heath
20	DF	USA	Kelli Hubly
21	FW	AUS	Hayley Raso

No.	Pos.	Nation	Player
23	MF	USA	Margaret Purce
24	GK	USA	Adrianna Franch
25	DF	USA	Meghan Klingenberg
27	DF	USA	Elizabeth Ball
30	MF	USA	Celeste Boureille
31	GK	USA	Bella Bixby
33	GK	USA	Britt Eckerstrom
34	FW	USA	Tyler Lussi
35	DF	USA	Gabby Seiler
36	MF	USA	Angela Salem
37	MF	USA	Emily Ogle
38	FW	USA	Simone Charley
41	DF	USA	Madison Pogarch

== Competitions ==
=== Preseason ===
==== Thorns Spring Invitational ====
March 24, 2019	Portland Thorns FC	2–1	Chicago Red Stars	Portland, Oregon
17:00	Lussi 6' (Sonnett); Sinclair 74' (Heath)	Report	Sharples 54' (Sánchez)	Stadium: Merlo Field; Attendance: 3,420

March 27, 2019	Portland Thorns FC	0–1	United States U-23	Portland, Oregon
19:30		Report	Macario 6' (pen.)	Stadium: Merlo Field; Attendance: 1,943

March 30, 2019	Portland Thorns FC	0–0	Reign FC	Portland, Oregon
19:30		Report		Stadium: Merlo Field; Attendance: 4,100

=== Regular season ===
April 14 1	Orlando Pride	0–2	Portland Thorns FC	Orlando, Florida
14:00 PST	Camila (yellow card) 90+1'	Report	Foord 45'; Heath 49'	Stadium: Orlando City Stadium; Attendance: 7,189; Referee: Ekaterina Koroleva

April 20 2	Chicago Red Stars	4–4	Portland Thorns FC	Bridgeview, Illinois
12:30	Nagasato 18' (pen.), 90+1'; Kerr 20'; Vasconcelos 78'	Report	Sinclair 16', 51', 87' (pen.); Crnogorčević 33'	Stadium: SeatGeek Stadium; Attendance: 12,967; Referee: Karen Abt

April 28 3	Sky Blue FC	2–2	Portland Thorns FC	Piscataway, New Jersey
15:00	Lloyd 6', 18'; James (yellow card) 60'	Report	Sonnett 32'; Heath 34'	Stadium: Yurcak Field; Attendance: 1,321; Referee: Reyna Fonesca

May 11 4	Orlando Pride	1–3	Portland Thorns FC	Orlando, Florida
7:30pm	Pressley 10'; Hill (yellow card) 35'; Pickett (yellow card) 74'	Report	Brynjarsdóttir 28'; Andressinha 36'; Foord 57'; Boureille (yellow card) 61'	Stadium: Orlando City Stadium; Attendance: 4,369; Referee: Marie-Soleil Beaudoin
Note: Play suspended for inclement weather in second half stoppage time

May 18 5	Washington Spirit	3–1	Portland Thorns FC	Boyds, Maryland
16:00	Hatch 16'; Dougherty Howard (yellow card) 25'; Brynjarsdottir 47' (o.g.); DiBiasi 71'; Staab (yellow card) 87'; Logarzo (yellow card) 90+4'	Box	Foord 67'	Stadium: Maryland SoccerPlex; Attendance: 3,049; Referee: Danielle Chesky

May 25 6	Sky Blue FC	0–1	Portland Thorns FC	Piscataway, New Jersey
15:00		Box	Purce 69'; Brynjarsdottir (yellow card) 87'	Stadium: Yurcak Field; Attendance: 1,472; Referee: Jasmine Peralta

June 2 7	Portland Thorns FC	3–0	Chicago Red Stars	Portland, Oregon
15:00	Purce 27', 31'; Ball (yellow card) 37'; Everett 85'	Box	Short (yellow card) 66'	Stadium: Providence Park; Attendance: 19,461; Referee: Victor Rivas

June 15 8	North Carolina Courage	1–1	Portland Thorns FC	Cary, North Carolina
16:45	Kurtz (yellow card) 19'; Spetsmark 59'	Box	Purce 26'	Stadium: WakeMed Soccer Park; Attendance: 6,172; Referee: Tori Penso
Note: doubleheader with North Carolina FC.

June 21 9	Portland Thorns FC	0–0	Utah Royals FC	Portland, Oregon
20:00	LaBonta (yellow card) 56'	Box	Boureille (yellow card) 30'	Stadium: Providence Park; Attendance: 15,581; Referee: Rosendo Mendoza

June 29 10	Houston Dash	1–2	Portland Thorns FC	Houston, Texas
17:30	Simon 51'; Murray (yellow card) 75'	Report	Ball (yellow card) 60'; Lussi 70'; Purce 75'	Stadium: BBVA Compass Stadium; Attendance: 3,379; Referee: Michael Radchuk

July 5 11	Portland Thorns FC	0–1	Reign FC	Portland, Oregon
20:00	Brynjarsdóttir (yellow card) 54'	Box; Report	Barnes (yellow card) 22'; Groom (yellow card) 52'; Celia 55' (yellow card) 64'	Stadium: Providence Park; Attendance: 19,116; Referee: Farhad Dadkho

July 14 12	Portland Thorns FC	4–3	Orlando Pride	Portland, Oregon
12:00	Raso 3'; Purce 58'; Sinclair 66'; Seiler (yellow card) 83'; Lussi 90+4'	Report	Hill (yellow card) 36'; Marta 61'; Menges 68' (o.g.); Greening (yellow card) 69' (goal) 90'; Elinsky (yellow card) 90+2'	Stadium: Providence Park; Attendance: 18,909; Referee: Matthew Franz

July 19 13	Utah Royals FC	2–2	Portland Thorns FC	Sandy, Utah
19:00	Press 43'; Corsie 90'	Report	Sinclair 9'; Foord (yellow card) 83'; Sauerbrunn 87' (o.g.)	Stadium: Rio Tinto Stadium; Attendance: 15,931; Referee: Elvis Osmanovic

July 24 14	Portland Thorns FC	5–0	Houston Dash	Portland, Oregon
19:30	Horan 7'; Raso 12', 23'; Sinclair 18' (pen.); Campbell 71' (o.g.)	Report	Chapman (yellow card) 70'	Stadium: Providence Park; Attendance: 22,329; Referee: Malik Badawi

August 3 15	Portland Thorns FC	1–1	Sky Blue FC	Portland, Oregon
20:00	Sinclair 39' (pen.)	Report	Dorsey 69'; Pierre-Louis (yellow card) 73' (yellow-red card) 90+2'	Stadium: Providence Park; Attendance: 19,070; Referee: Mark Allatin

August 7 16	Reign FC	1–0	Portland Thorns FC	Tacoma, Washington
19:00	Catley (yellow card) 31'; White 55'; Taylor (yellow card) 78'	Box; Report		Stadium: Cheney Stadium; Attendance: 5,865; Referee: Danielle Chesky

August 11 17	Portland Thorns FC	2–1	North Carolina Courage	Portland, Oregon
12:00	Foord (yellow card) 19'; Labbé 56' (o.g.); Erceg 82' (o.g.)	Report	Dunn 4'	Stadium: Providence Park; Attendance: 25,218; Referee: Jon Freemon
Note: Game was broadcast on ESPNews

August 17 18	Portland Thorns FC	3–1	Washington Spirit	Portland, Oregon
19:30	Raso 5'; Sonnett 19'; Sinclair 63'	Report	Kellond-Knight (yellow card) 58'; Sullivan 68'	Stadium: Providence Park; Attendance: 20,895; Referee: Michael Radchuk

August 25 19	Portland Thorns FC	3–0	Chicago Red Stars	Portland, Oregon
12:00	Sinclair 12'; Purce 24', 56'; Heath (yellow card) 70'	Report	Stanton (yellow card) 63'; Nagasato (yellow card) 84'	Stadium: Providence Park; Attendance: 17,542; Referee: Lukasz Szpala

September 6 20	Utah Royals FC	1–0	Portland Thorns FC	Sandy, Utah
18:30	Sauerbrunn 36'; Corsie (yellow card) 65'; Rodriguez (yellow card) 78'	Report	Sonnett (yellow card) 61' (yellow-red card) 77'; Horan (yellow card) 80'	Stadium: Rio Tinto Stadium; Attendance: 10897; Referee: Ismir Pekmic

September 11 21	Portland Thorns FC	0–6	North Carolina Courage	Portland, Oregon
19:30	Klingenberg (yellow card) 57'; Horan (yellow card) 58'	Report	Debinha 15'; L. Williams 21', 24', 68'; Dunn 61'; Hinkle (yellow card) 69'; Hamilton 89'	Stadium: Providence Park; Attendance: 17,517; Referee: Guido Gonzalez Jr.

September 21 22	Portland Thorns FC	1–0	Houston Dash	Portland, Oregon
19:30	Heath 48'	Report		Stadium: Providence Park; Attendance: 21,022; Referee: Victor Rivas

September 29 23	Reign FC	2–0	Portland Thorns FC	Tacoma, Washington
13:00	Taylor 27'; Nielsen (yellow card) 36'; Yanez (yellow card) 51'; Balcer 81'	Box	Foord (yellow card) 34'; Dagný (yellow card) 57'; Sonnett (yellow card) 89'	Stadium: Cheney Stadium; Attendance: 7,370; Referee: Matthew Franz

October 12 24	Portland Thorns FC	0–0	Washington Spirit	Portland, Oregon
19:30		Report		Stadium: Providence Park; Attendance: 24,521; Referee: Farhad Dadkho

==== Postseason playoffs ====
October 20 Semifinal	Chicago Red Stars	1–0	Portland Thorns FC	Bridgeview, Illinois
2:30 p.m. CDT	Kerr 8'	Report	Ball (yellow card) 45+1'	Stadium: SeatGeek Stadium; Attendance: 9,218; Referee: Danielle Chesky
Note: Televised on ESPN2

==== Regular-season standings ====
Pos	Team	Pld	W	D	L	GF	GA	GD	Pts	Qualification
1	North Carolina Courage (C)	24	15	4	5	54	23	+31	49	NWSL Shield
2	Chicago Red Stars	24	14	2	8	41	28	+13	44	NWSL Playoffs
3	Portland Thorns FC	24	11	7	6	40	31	+9	40	NWSL Playoffs
4	Reign FC	24	10	8	6	27	27	0	38	NWSL Playoffs
5	Washington Spirit	24	9	7	8	30	25	+5	34	
6	Utah Royals FC	24	10	4	10	25	25	0	34	
7	Houston Dash	24	7	5	12	21	36	−15	26	
8	Sky Blue FC	24	5	5	14	20	34	−14	20	
9	Orlando Pride	24	4	4	16	24	53	−29	16	

Source: NWSL
Rules for classification: Tiebreakers
(C) Champions

===== Results summary =====
Overall								Home						Away					
Pld	W	D	L	GF	GA	GD	Pts	W	D	L	GF	GA	GD	W	D	L	GF	GA	GD
24	11	7	6	40	31	+9	40	7	3	2	22	13	+9	4	4	4	18	18	0

Last updated: October 12, 2019.
Source: NWSLsoccer.com

===== Results by round =====
Round	1	2	3	4	5	6	7	8	9	10	11	12	13	14	15	16	17	18	19	20	21	22	23	24
Stadium	A	A	A	A	A	A	H	A	H	A	H	H	A	H	H	A	H	H	H	A	H	H	A	H
Result	W	D	D	W	L	W	W	D	D	W	L	W	D	W	D	L	W	W	W	L	L	W	L	D
Position	1	1	4	5	6	3	2	3	3	1	3	2	1	1	2	2	1	1	1	1	2	3	3	3

Updated to match(es) played on September 29, 2019. Source: NWSLsoccer.com
A = Away; H = Home; W = Win; D = Draw; L = Loss

== Statistical leaders ==
=== Top scorers ===
Rank	Player	Goals
1	(Canada) Christine Sinclair	9
2	(United States) Margaret Purce	8
3	(Australia) Hayley Raso	4
4	(Australia) Caitlin Foord	3
4	(United States) Tobin Heath	3
6	(United States) Tyler Lussi	2
6	(United States) Emily Sonnett	2
8	(Brazil) Andressinha	1
8	(Switzerland) Ana-Maria Crnogorčević	1
8	(Iceland) Dagny Brynjarsdottir	1
8	(United States) Marissa Everett	1
8	(United States) Lindsey Horan	1

=== Top assists ===
Rank	Player	Assists
1	(United States) Meghan Klingenberg	4
2	(United States) Tobin Heath	3
3	(United States) Simone Charley	2
3	(Australia) Caitlin Foord	2
3	(United States) Lindsey Horan	2
6	(Switzerland) Ana-Maria Crnogorčević	1
6	(Canada) Christine Sinclair	1
6	(Iceland) Dagny Brynjarsdottir	1
6	(United States) Celeste Boureille	1
6	(United States) Tyler Lussi	1
6	(Australia) Ellie Carpenter	1

=== Shutouts ===
Rank	Player	Clean sheets
1	(United States) Adrianna Franch	4
2	(United States) Britt Eckerstrom	3

== Player Transactions ==
=== 2019 NWSL College Draft ===
Source: National Women's Soccer League

Round	Pick	Nat.	Player	Pos.	Previous Team
Round 3	24	(United States)	Emily Ogle	M	Penn State

=== In ===
Date	Player	Positions played	Previous club	Fee/notes	Ref.
February 13, 2019	(Iceland) Dagný Brynjarsdóttir	MF	Maternity Leave	Signed	
May 8, 2019	(United States) Madison Pogarch	DF	Rutgers University	Signed	
May 8, 2019	(United States) Simone Charley	FW	Vanderbilt University	Signed	

=== Out ===
Date	Player	Positions played	Destination club	Fee/notes	Ref.
October 1, 2018	(United States) Meg Morris	MF		Retired	
May 8, 2019	(United States) Ifeoma Onumonu	FW	Reign FC	Waived.	
May 8, 2019	(United States) Mallory Weber	FW	Utah Royals FC	Waived.	

== Awards ==
As of October 9, 2019.

=== NWSL Monthly Awards ===
==== NWSL Team of the Month ====
Month	Goalkeeper	Defenders	Midfielders	Forwards	Ref
April		(United States) Meghan Klingenberg	(Canada) Christine Sinclair	(United States) Tobin Heath	
June		(United States) Katherine Reynolds		(United States) Midge Purce	
July			(United States) Gabby Seiler		
August		(United States) Emily Menges	(Canada) Christine Sinclair	(United States) Midge Purce	

=== NWSL Weekly Awards ===
==== NWSL Player of the Week ====
Week	Result	Player	Ref.
1	Won	(United States) Tobin Heath	
2	Won	(Canada) Christine Sinclair	
19	Won	(United States) Midge Purce	

==== NWSL Goal of the Week ====
Week	Result	Player	Ref.
1	Won	(United States) Tobin Heath	
2	Nominated	(Canada) Christine Sinclair	
3	Won	(United States) Tobin Heath	
5	Won	(Brazil) Andressinha	
7	Nominated	(United States) Margaret Purce	
8	Won	(United States) Margaret Purce	
9	Nominated	(United States) Margaret Purce	
11	Won	(United States) Tyler Lussi	
13	Won	(United States) Tyler Lussi	
14	Nominated	(Canada) Christine Sinclair	
15	Nominated	(Australia) Hayley Raso	
23	Won	(United States) Tobin Heath	

==== NWSL Save of the Week ====
Week	Result	Player	Ref.
5	Nominated	(United States) Britt Eckerstrom	
6	Won	(United States) Britt Eckerstrom	
14	Won	(United States) Adrianna Franch	
17	Won	(United States) Adrianna Franch	
18	Nominated	(United States) Adrianna Franch	

== See also ==
- 2019 National Women's Soccer League season
- 2019 in American soccer
