= 2021 Portland Thorns FC season =

Portland Thorns FC's ninth season

Portland Thorns FC
2021 season
- Owner: Merritt Paulson
- General manager: Gavin Wilkinson (suspended October 6, 2021)
- Head coach: Mark Parsons
- Stadium: Providence Park (capacity: 25,218)
- NWSL: 1st (NWSL Shield)
- Challenge Cup: Champions
- WICC: Champions
- NWSL Playoffs: Semi-finalists
Home colors	Away colors
- All statistics correct as of August 5, 2022.

The 2021 Portland Thorns FC season was the team's ninth season as a professional women's soccer team. Thorns FC plays in the National Women's Soccer League, the top tier of women's soccer in the United States.

== Background ==
The Thorns were semi-finalists in the 2020 NWSL Challenge Cup and champions of the 2020 NWSL Fall Series, which replaced the 2020 NWSL season as a result of the COVID-19 pandemic.

=== Abuse scandal ===
Throughout the 2021 National Women's Soccer League season, allegations of abuse surfaced in multiple teams across the National Women's Soccer League in the United States. As a result, five out of the ten teams in the league had head coaches resign or be fired, with league commissioner Lisa Baird also resigning due to the scandal.

In late-September, The Athletic published an investigation into North Carolina Courage head coach Paul Riley, alleging that Riley had sexually coerced and verbally abused players on his teams, specifically during the time period between 2011 and 2015 (consisting of his time in WPS, WPSL, and NWSL). More than a dozen players from every team Riley had coached since 2010 spoke to the publication and two named players went on the record with allegations against him. In the article, Riley denied the allegations. The article also stated that NWSL failed to act on Riley's alleged abuses multiple times, including earlier in 2021 when the league declined to act on an offer from two of Riley's alleged victims to assist in investigating Riley's alleged abuses. Later that day, the Courage announced that Riley had been fired due to "very serious allegations of misconduct".

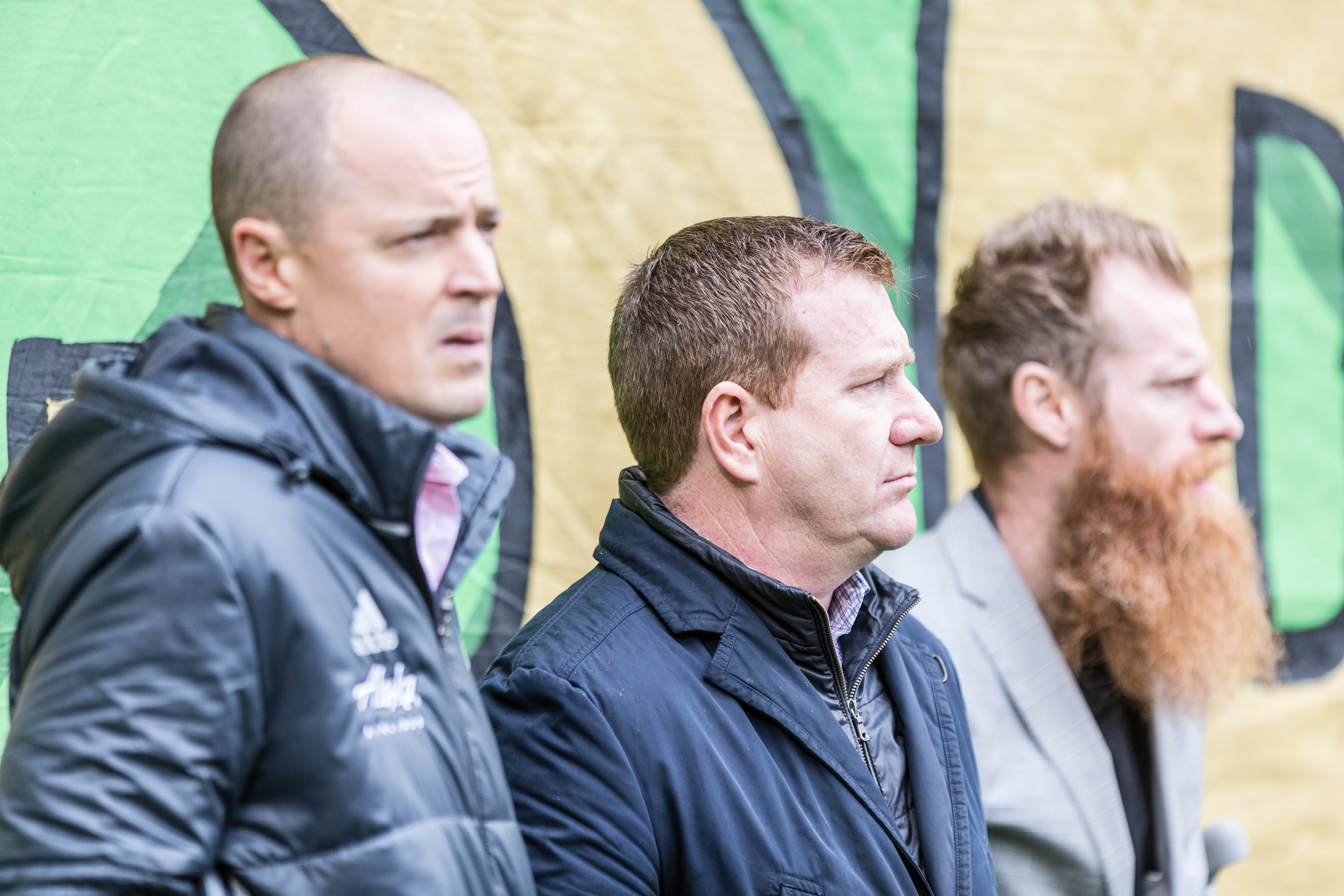
Thorns owner Merritt Paulson (left) and general manager Gavin Wilkinson (center) attend a Portland Timbers match in 2016. Paulson and Wilkinson apologized following The Athletic's report on the 2021 NWSL abuse scandal.

The Thorns released a statement the same day citing that some of the incidents occurred during Riley's two-year tenure as head coach of the Thorns in 2015 and discussing their reaction to the incidents at the time. The Thorns later claimed to have investigated the reports and allowed Riley's contact to expire as a result, but did not fire him, and later thanked Riley for his service and continued to praise his performances in the following years. Paulson also apologized for this course of action.

In the report by The Athletic, a former Thorns player who had raised complaints about Riley also said Thorns general manager Gavin Wilkinson complained to her about a newspaper story in 2014 regarding her sexuality and suggested to her that she should not publicly discuss her sexuality or Pride. Wilkinson initially disputed Shim's recollection, calling it "bullshit", then released another statement apologizing to Shim. The player's story was further corroborated by the reporter who wrote the story, who noted that a member of the club's communications staff had complained about the lack of advance notice about the story's publication, as well as for another story about the same player in 2018 after she had left the team. Another reporter who covered the team corroborated the reporter's account.

Also in September, former Sky Blue FC player Nadia Nadim accused management of forging her signature on a contract extension so they could trade her to the Thorns in early 2016.

Thorns and Timbers owner Merritt Paulson apologized in an open letter on October 4, but a number of Portland Thorns players released a statement two days later calling for Wilkinson to be suspended. On the day of the players' statement, Wilkinson, who was responsible for Riley's hire and the eventual non-retainment of Riley's services following the 2015 season, was put on administrative leave from his role as the Thorns general manager, though not from his roles as general manager and president of the co-owned Portland Timbers. That evening, players interrupted several matches to link arms in a circle in the center of a field to protest against abuse. The protest was repeated by players in several leagues outside the United States, such as the FA Women's Super League, in a gesture of solidarity.

==== Aftermath ====
The club reinstated Wilkinson as Timbers and Thorns president of soccer in January 2022 following an internal business review; however, due to ongoing league, union, and federation investigations, no players could be interviewed, and the players association disavowed any connection between the internal review and other investigations.

Wilkinson and the Portland Timbers front office faced further accusations of misconduct in the face of abuse reports in February 2022, when Major League Soccer suspended Timbers player Andy Polo pending an investigation into allegations of domestic violence made by Polo's ex-partner. Police reports later indicated that Timbers employees were present when police arrived to investigate the initial call in May 2021, months before The Athletic's report on Paul Riley was published, but the team failed to report the incident to the league for nine months. Polo's ex-partner detailed the event on Peruvian television, and claimed she had been pressured into not filing charges against Polo. An MLS investigation in March 2022 claimed the Timbers did not pressure Polo's ex-partner nor intentionally conceal the incident or their involvement. Wilkinson claimed Diego Valeri opposed the decision to cut Polo, which Valeri denied as he was no longer with the Timbers at the time of Polo's release from the team.

=== Olivia Moultrie lawsuit ===
In 2019, after signing deals with Wasserman Media Group and Nike, Inc., the family of 13-year-old professional soccer player Olivia Moultrie announced that Moultrie was moving from Canyon Country, California, to Portland, Oregon, to join the Portland Thorns FC developmental academy.

On May 4, 2021, with the support of the Thorns front office and players, Moultrie and her father K.C. sued the National Women's Soccer League over a rule preventing players under the age of 18 from signing with the league, claiming it violates antitrust law because Major League Soccer, the North American top-division men's league, did not prohibit such signings. On May 24, 2021, U.S. District Judge Karin J. Immergut issued a 14-day temporary restraining order against the league on the request of Moultrie's lawyers, stating that the league had not presented "any compelling procompetitive reasons" for the policy.

The league argued that as a single entity, it could not be anticompetitive. However, in the temporary restraining order, Immergut noted that the NWSL might not meet the legal standard for a single-entity organization, being instead a collection of independent teams competing for talent, and that the age rule therefore would violate section 1 of the Sherman Antitrust Act. If such a ruling became permanent, other league rules that relied on its single-entity structure could be similarly contested.

On May 29, 2021, the league delayed, and then denied, the Thorns's discovery claim to the right to sign Moultrie to an NWSL standard player agreement. This prevented the Thorns from signing her despite the court order, made her discovery rights available to other NWSL teams, and delayed any potential NWSL contract offer.

On June 6, 2021, OL Reign acquired the discovery rights to sign Moultrie to an NWSL contract, and subsequently traded them to the Thorns in exchange for a third-round pick in the 2022 NWSL Draft. This allowed the Thorns to extend a professional contract offer to Moultrie in compliance with the court's restraining order. According to Moultrie's attorney, the league claimed to be in the process of creating a special discovery process for young players.

On June 18, 2021, Immergut granted Moultrie a preliminary injunction allowing her to sign an NWSL contract, which the league stated that it would appeal to the United States Court of Appeals for the Ninth Circuit on the grounds that the league was negotiating a collective bargaining agreement with the NWSL Players Association that would codify an age rule negotiated with players.

On June 30, 2021, Moultrie officially signed a three-year professional contract with the NWSL to play for Portland Thorns FC. On July 30, 2021, Moultrie and her attorneys settled their lawsuit with the NWSL out of court, which allowed Moultrie to sign with the league but left the league's age rule otherwise prohibiting players under the age of 18 intact. The settlement also allowed any age rule eventually agreed upon in the league's collective bargaining agreement with the Players Association to make Moultrie ineligible again.

==== Aftermath ====
Moultrie debuted for the Thorns as a professional on August 19, 2021, against the Houston Dash during the 2021 Women's International Champions Cup exhibition tournament. She scored her first professional goal during the match off a direct free kick. Moultrie would finish the 2021 NWSL season with nine appearances and an assist. In 2022, the league allowed 17-year-old Jaedyn Shaw to join the league in an exemption to the age rule similar to the one created for Moultrie's settlement. Shaw's rights were claimed by San Diego Wave FC, who signed her to a contract through 2023. Shaw started the season training with the Washington Spirit, who had attempted to sign her directly, but were denied by the league's discovery process.

== Stadium and facilities ==
Thorns FC continued to play and train in Providence Park, their home since the team's inaugural season in 2013. The team held its first preseason training at the Portland Timbers training facilities in Beaverton, Oregon, before resuming training at the stadium.

== Team ==
=== Staff ===
As of September 25, 2021.

Technical
General manager	Gavin Wilkinson
Head coach	Mark Parsons
Assistant coach	Sophie Clough
Assistant coach	Rich Gunney
Goalkeeper coach	Nadine Angerer
Medical
Head athletic trainer	Pierre Soubrier
Assistant athletic trainer	Kelly Strasser
Performance specialist	Tom Milroy
Head physician	Breanne Brown

=== Squad ===
As of September 25, 2021.

No.	Nat.	Name	Date of birth (age)	Since	Previous team	Notes
Goalkeepers
1	(United States)	Bella Bixby	November 20, 1995 (aged 25)	2018	(United States) Oregon State	
35	(United States)	Abby Smith	October 4, 1993 (aged 27)	2021	(United States) Kansas City Current	
43	(United States)	Shelby Hogan	May 10, 1998 (aged 23)	2021	(United States) Providence College	
Defenders
4	(United States)	Becky Sauerbrunn	June 6, 1985 (aged 36)	2020	(United States) Utah Royals FC	
5	(United States)	Emily Menges	July 28, 1992 (aged 29)	2014	(United States) Georgetown	
14	(Finland)	Natalia Kuikka	December 1, 1995 (aged 25)	2020	(Sweden) Kopparberg/Göteborg FC	INT (Note: INT: International player)
15	(United States)	Madison Pogarch	November 5, 1997 (aged 23)	2019	(United States) Rutgers	
18	(United States)	Christen Westphal	September 2, 1993 (aged 28)	2020	(United States) Reign FC	
20	(United States)	Kelli Hubly	August 9, 1994 (aged 27)	2017	(United States) DePaul	
25	(United States)	Meghan Klingenberg	August 2, 1988 (aged 33)	2015	(United States) Orlando Pride	
39	(United States)	Meaghan Nally	June 30, 1998 (aged 23)	2020	(United States) Georgetown Hoyas	
41	(United States)	Hannah Betfort	January 4, 1999 (aged 22)	2021	(United States) Wake Forest	
Midfielders
10	(United States)	Lindsey Horan	May 26, 1994 (aged 27)	2016	(France) Paris Saint-Germain	
11	(Costa Rica)	Raquel Rodríguez	October 28, 1993 (aged 27)	2020	(United States) Sky Blue FC	
19	(United States)	Crystal Dunn	July 3, 1992 (aged 29)	2020	(United States) North Carolina Courage (via (United States) OL Reign)	
23	(United States)	Yazmeen Ryan	February 25, 1999 (aged 22)	2021	(United States) Texas Christian	
30	(United States)	Celeste Boureille	April 20, 1994 (aged 27)	2016	(United States) California Golden Bears	
36	(United States)	Angela Salem	July 24, 1988 (aged 33)	2018	(United States) Boston Breakers	
42	(United States)	Olivia Moultrie	September 17, 2005 (aged 16)	2021		
Forwards
7	(United States)	Simone Charley	February 4, 1995 (aged 26)	2019	(United States) Vanderbilt	
9	(United States)	Sophia Smith	August 10, 2000 (aged 21)	2020	(United States) Stanford	
12	(Canada)	Christine Sinclair	June 12, 1983 (aged 38)	2013	(United States) Western New York Flash	
22	(United States)	Morgan Weaver	October 18, 1997 (aged 23)	2020	(United States) Washington State	
34	(United States)	Tyler Lussi	January 26, 1995 (aged 26)	2017	(United States) Princeton	
40	(United States)	Marissa Everett	August 29, 1997 (aged 24)	2019	(United States) Oregon	

== Competitions ==
=== NWSL Challenge Cup ===
In 2021, the Thorns competed in the cup's West Division during the group stage.

==== Group stage ====
April 15, 2021 1	Chicago Red Stars	0–1	Portland Thorns FC	Bridgeview, Illinois
	Stevens (yellow card) 85'	Report	Westphal (yellow card) 45'; Weaver 66' (Boureille)	Stadium: SeatGeek Stadium

April 18, 2022 2	Portland Thorns FC	2–1	Kansas City NWSL	Portland, Oregon
19:30 PDT	Rodríguez 8' (Klingenberg); Charley (yellow card) 49' (yellow-red card) 90'; Parsons (yellow card) 90' (red card); Lussi 58' (Westphal); Weaver (yellow card) 90+4' (red card)	Report	Pickett (yellow card) 48'; Rodriguez (yellow card) 70', (goal) 80' (Pickett); Del Fava (yellow card) 90+1'; Edmonds (yellow card) 90+4' (red card)	Stadium: Providence Park; Attendance: 4,646; Referee: Danielle Chesky; Assistant referees: Deleana Quan, Kali Smith; Fourth official: Adorae Monroy

April 21, 2021 3	Portland Thorns FC	2–0	OL Reign	Portland, Oregon
19:00 PDT	Horan 17', (yellow card) 72'; Charley 46'	Report	Brooks (yellow card) 65'	Stadium: Providence Park; Attendance: 5,289

May 2, 2021 4	Houston Dash	1–1	Portland Thorns FC	Houston, Texas
18:30 CDT	Groom 45+2', (yellow card) 57'; Chapman (yellow card) 90+3'	Report	Sinclair 77'	Stadium: PNC Stadium; Attendance: 3,162; Referee: Elvis Osmanovic

==== West Division standings ====
Pos	Team	Pld	W	D	L	GF	GA	GD	Pts	Qualification
1	Portland Thorns FC	4	3	1	0	6	2	+4	10	Qualification for the Championship
2	OL Reign	4	2	1	1	5	5	0	7	
3	Houston Dash	4	1	3	0	4	2	+2	6	
4	Chicago Red Stars	4	0	2	2	3	5	−2	2	
5	Kansas City	4	0	1	3	4	8	−4	1	

Source: NWSL
Rules for classification: Tiebreakers

==== Championship ====
Portland Thorns FC won the right to host the final by finishing with the best record across both divisions. NWSL commissioner Lisa Baird wrote a letter to Oregon governor Kate Brown requesting an exemption from a ban on fan attendance due to the "extreme risk" designation for COVID-19 in Multnomah County at the time. Brown denied the request, prompting rumors that the league might seek an alternative venue. However, Brown then downgraded the county's status four days before the match on May 4, 2021, to "high risk", allowing the Thorns to make up to 15 percent of the venue's capacity available.

May 8, 2021 Finals	Portland Thorns FC	1–1 (6–5 p)	NJ/NY Gotham FC	Portland, Oregon
10:00 PDT	Sinclair 8'; Charley (yellow card) 79'	Report	Lewandowski (yellow card) 38'; Lloyd 61' (Dorsey)	Stadium: Providence Park; Referee: Natalie Simon; Assistant referees: Brooke Mayo, Deleana Quan; Reserve assistant: Rachel Smith; Fourth official: Karen Callado
	Penalties
	Sinclair (penalty scored); Klingenberg (penalty missed); Horan (penalty scored); Rodríguez (penalty scored); Dunn (penalty scored); Sauerbrunn (penalty scored); Weaver (penalty scored)		(penalty scored) Long; (penalty scored) Lloyd; (penalty missed) Cudjoe; (penalty scored) Freeman; (penalty scored) Onumonu; (penalty scored) Viens; (penalty missed) Kawasumi

=== Regular season ===
==== Matches ====
May 16, 2021	Portland Thorns FC	5–0	Chicago Red Stars	Portland, Oregon
16:00 PDT	Davidson 4' (o.g.); Sinclair 13' (pen.); Smith 16' (Weaver), 30' (Weaver); Horan (yellow card) 64'; Lussi 72'	Report		Stadium: Providence Park; Attendance: 5,819; Referee: Katja Koroleva

May 23, 2021	Portland Thorns FC	1–2	OL Reign	Portland, Oregon
15:00 PDT	Sinclair 4'; Dunn (yellow card) 9'	Report	Rapinoe 9'; Cruz 15' (Weatherholt), (yellow card) 65'; Fishlock (yellow card) 35'; Cox (yellow card) 85'	Stadium: Providence Park; Attendance: 6,435; Referee: Karen Callado

May 26, 2021	Orlando Pride	2–1	Portland Thorns FC	Orlando, Florida
19:00 EDT	Morgan 22' (Kornieck); Leroux 46'; Harris (yellow card) 90+7'	Report	Charley (yellow card) 38', (goal) 42' (Kuikka); Salem (yellow card) 45+3'	Stadium: Exploria Stadium; Attendance: 3,407; Referee: Laura Rodriguez

May 30, 2021	NJ/NY Gotham FC	0–1	Portland Thorns FC	Harrison, New Jersey
15:00 EDT	Dydasco (yellow card) 19'; Long (yellow card) 83'	Report	Dunn 56' (Klingenberg); Klingenberg (yellow card) 69'; Rodríguez (yellow card) 75'	Stadium: Red Bull Arena; Attendance: 2,750; Referee: Karen Abt

June 5, 2021	Portland Thorns FC	3–0	Racing Louisville FC	Portland, Oregon
19:30 PDT	Salem 8' (Rodríguez); Rodríguez 48' (Horan); Horan (yellow card) 72', (goal) 77' (Salem)	Report	Martin (yellow card) 49'; McClure (yellow card) 85'	Stadium: Providence Park; Referee: Samantha Martinez

June 20, 2021	Portland Thorns FC	1–0	Kansas City NWSL	Portland, Oregon
13:00 PDT	Charley 45+5' (Dunn)	Report	Ball (yellow card) 12'; Edmonds (yellow card) 37'; Pickett (yellow card) 84'	Stadium: Providence Park; Referee: Adorae Monroy

June 26, 2021	North Carolina Courage	2–0	Portland Thorns FC	Cary, North Carolina
19:00 EDT	Williams 57', 66' (Pickett)	Report	Ryan (yellow card) 78'	Stadium: WakeMed Soccer Park; Attendance: 5,674; Referee: Natalie Simon

July 3, 2021	Racing Louisville FC	0–2	Portland Thorns FC	Louisville, Kentucky
19:30 EDT	McCaskill (yellow card) 29'; Riehl (yellow card) 34'	Report	Rodríguez 30' (pen.); Charley 52' (Menges)	Stadium: Lynn Family Stadium; Attendance: 6,822; Referee: Karen Callado

July 11, 2021	Portland Thorns FC	0–0	NJ/NY Gotham FC	Portland, Oregon
12:00 PDT		Report	Lewandowski (yellow card) 10'; Purce (yellow card) 29'; Kawasumi (yellow card) 33'; Dorsey (yellow card) 90+2'	Stadium: Providence Park; Attendance: 14,731; Referee: Tori Penso

July 18, 2021	Portland Thorns FC	2–1	Orlando Pride	Portland, Oregon
19:30 PDT	Smith 26' (Rodríguez); Everett 58' (Klingenberg); Ryan (yellow card) 80'; Pogarch (yellow card) 90+1'	Report	Dougherty Howard (yellow card) 60'; McClernon (yellow card) 82'; Viggiano 90+5'	Stadium: Providence Park; Attendance: 14,985; Referee: Laura Rodriguez

July 24, 2021	Houston Dash	0–1	Portland Thorns FC	Houston, Texas
19:30 CDT	Ogle (yellow card) 64'	Report	Smith 1'; Salem (yellow card) 54'; Hubly (yellow card) 62'	Stadium: PNC Stadium; Attendance: 1,929; Referee: Luis Guardia

August 1, 2021	Portland Thorns FC	2–0	Kansas City NWSL	Portland, Oregon
12:00 PDT	Edmonds 10' (o.g.); Everett; Moultrie (yellow card) 87'	Report		Stadium: Providence Park; Attendance: 16,246; Referee: Samantha Martinez

August 7, 2021	Washington Spirit	0–1	Portland Thorns FC	Leesburg, Virginia
19:00 EDT	Sullivan (yellow card) 65'	Report	Charley 29' (Moultrie); Smith (yellow card) 70'	Stadium: Segra Field; Attendance: 2,889; Referee: Katja Koroleva; Assistant referees: Ben Pilgrim, Laura Waliski; Fourth official: Jonah Kind

August 14, 2021	Orlando Pride	1–1	Portland Thorns FC	Orlando, Florida
19:00 EDT	Taylor 13' (Courtney Petersen); Riley (yellow card) 37'; Marta (yellow card) 56'; McClernon (yellow card) 67'; Jónsdóttir (yellow card) 89'; Krieger (yellow card) 90+3'	Report	Charley 78' (Klingenberg); Everett (yellow card) 86'	Stadium: Exploria Stadium; Attendance: 4,209; Referee: Matthew Franz

August 25, 2021	Portland Thorns FC	2–1	NJ/NY Gotham FC	Portland, Oregon
19:30 PDT	Smith 29'; Sinclair 41' (pen.); Horan (yellow card) 52'	Report	Lloyd 78' (Dydasco)	Stadium: Providence Park; Attendance: 14,299; Referee: Mark Allatin

August 29, 2021	OL Reign	2–1	Portland Thorns FC	Seattle, Washington
16:00 PDT	Huerta (yellow card) 2'; Rapinoe 16' (Fishlock), 40' (pen.); McNabb (yellow card) 45+4'; Angelina (yellow card) 87'	Report	Salem 45+4'; Kuikka (yellow card) 90+1'	Stadium: Lumen Field; Attendance: 27,278; Referee: Jon Freemon
Note: Doubleheader with Seattle Sounders FC. As of the date played, this was the largest reported attendance to any NWSL match.

September 4, 2021	Portland Thorns FC	3–0 (forfeit)	Washington Spirit	Portland, Oregon
		Report		Stadium: Providence Park; Attendance: N/A
Note: This match was not played. After being initially postponed due to the Spirit being unable to field a full roster after four players tested positive for COVID-19, the NWSL declared this match a forfeit by the Spirit on Sep 16, citing alleged violations of the league's COVID-19 protocols, and credited Portland with a 3–0 victory.

September 12, 2021	North Carolina Courage	0–1	Portland Thorns FC	Cary, North Carolina
15:00 EDT	Mathias (yellow card) 25'; Roccaro (yellow card) 30'	Report	Smith 57' (Sinclair); Moultrie (yellow card) 88'	Stadium: WakeMed Soccer Park; Attendance: 5,161; Referee: Matthew Franz

September 25, 2021	Chicago Red Stars	2–1	Portland Thorns FC	Bridgeview, Illinois
19:00 CDT	Watt 25' (Wright); Hill 65' (Pugh)	Report	Sinclair 24' (Dunn); Sauerbrunn (yellow card) 90+2'	Stadium: SeatGeek Stadium; Attendance: 3,527; Referee: Katja Koroleva

October 6, 2021	Portland Thorns FC	2–3	Houston Dash	Portland, Oregon
19:00 PDT	Sauerbrunn (yellow card) 17'; Sinclair 30' (Horan); Horan (yellow card) 56'; Smith 57' (Horan)	Report	Daly 18' (pen.), 79'; Mewis 23' (Hanson)	Stadium: Providence Park; Attendance: 11,139; Referee: Natalie Simon

October 10, 2021	Kansas City NWSL	0–0	Portland Thorns FC	Kansas City, Kansas
16:00 CDT		Report		Stadium: Legends Field; Attendance: 5,438; Referee: Alyssa Nichols

October 13, 2021	Portland Thorns FC	1–1	OL Reign	Portland, Oregon
19:30 PDT	Weaver 3'	Report	Rapinoe 86' (pen.); Angelina (yellow card) 90'	Stadium: Providence Park; Attendance: 11,754; Referee: Tori Penso

October 17, 2021	Houston Dash	0–1	Portland Thorns FC	Houston, Texas
18:00 CDT	Chapman (yellow card) 52'	Report	Horan 43' (Weaver); Rodríguez (yellow card) 60'	Stadium: PNC Stadium; Attendance: 4,792; Referee: Luis Guardia

October 30, 2021	Portland Thorns FC	0–0	North Carolina Courage	Portland, Oregon
19:00 PDT		Report		Stadium: Providence Park; Attendance: 17,584; Referee: Greg Dopka

==== Regular season standings ====
Pos	Team	Pld	W	D	L	GF	GA	GD	Pts	Qualification
1	Portland Thorns FC	24	13	5	6	33	17	+16	44	NWSL Shield
2	OL Reign	24	13	3	8	37	24	+13	42	Playoffs – Semi-finals
3	Washington Spirit (C)	24	11	6	7	29	26	+3	39	Playoffs – First round
4	Chicago Red Stars	24	11	5	8	28	28	0	38	Playoffs – First round
5	NJ/NY Gotham FC	24	8	11	5	29	21	+8	35	Playoffs – First round
6	North Carolina Courage	24	9	6	9	28	23	+5	33	Playoffs – First round
7	Houston Dash	24	9	5	10	31	31	0	32	
8	Orlando Pride	24	7	7	10	27	32	−5	28	
9	Racing Louisville FC	24	5	7	12	21	40	−19	22	
10	Kansas City	24	3	7	14	15	36	−21	16	

Source: NWSL
Rules for classification: Tiebreakers
(C) Champions

==== Results summary ====
Overall								Home						Away					
Pld	W	D	L	GF	GA	GD	Pts	W	D	L	GF	GA	GD	W	D	L	GF	GA	GD
24	13	5	6	33	17	+16	44	7	3	2	22	8	+14	6	2	4	11	9	+2

Last updated: November 14, 2021.
Source: NWSLsoccer.com

==== Results by matchday ====
Matchday	1	2	3	4	5	6	7	8	9	10	11	12	13	14	15	16	17	18	19	20	21	22	23	24	25
Stadium	H	H	A	A	H	H	A	A	H	H	A	H	A	A	H	A	H	A	A	H	A	H	A	H	H
Result	W	L	L	W	W	W	L	W	D	W	W	W	W	D	W	L	W	W	L	L	D	D	W	D	L
Position	1	5	7	3	2	2	3	2	3	1	1	1	1	1	1	1	1	1	1	1	1	1	1	1	1

Updated to match(es) played on November 14, 2021. Source: NWSL
A = Away; H = Home; W = Win; D = Draw; L = Loss

=== NWSL Playoffs ===
In 2021, the NWSL expanded the single-elimination playoff field from four to six teams, and granted the top two teams in the regular-season standings a first-round bye. The Thorns finished first in the league to win the NWSL Shield and hosted the third-seeded Chicago Red Stars in the playoff semi-finals.

November 14, 2021	Portland Thorns FC	0–2	Chicago Red Stars	Portland, Oregon
14:30 PDT	Salem (yellow card) 80'	Report	Johnson 37' (DiBernardo); Woldmoe 59' (Gautrat)	Stadium: Providence Park; Attendance: 15,832; Referee: Katja Koroleva; Assistant referees: Deleana Quan, Meghan Mullen; Fourth official: Samantha Martinez

=== International Champions Cup ===
The 2021 International Champions Cup Women's Tournament was a friendly tournament of women's association football matches. It was the third edition of the Women's International Champions Cup and took place in Portland, Oregon, United States, from August 18 to 21, 2021. Portland Thorns FC qualified as champions of the 2020 Fall Series and emerged the winners, defeating Olympique Lyonnais Féminin 1–0 in the final, while FC Barcelona Femení won the third-place match.

==== Bracket ====
Semi-finals
August 18 – Portland
(France) Lyon	3
(Spain) Barcelona	2
August 18 – Portland
(United States) Portland Thorns FC (p)	2 (3)
(United States) Houston Dash	2 (1)

Final
August 21 – Portland
(France) Lyon	0
(United States) Portland Thorns FC	1
Third place play-off
August 21 – Portland
(Spain) Barcelona	3
(United States) Houston Dash	2

==== Matches ====
August 18, 2021 Semi-finals	Portland Thorns FC (United States)	2–2 (3–1 p)	(United States) Houston Dash	Portland, Oregon
20:06 PDT	Kuikka 51'; Moultrie 58'	Report	Groom 17', 41'	Stadium: Providence Park; Referee: Adorae Monroy
	Penalties
	Klingenberg (penalty scored); Kuikka (penalty missed); Moultrie (penalty scored); Charley (penalty scored)		(penalty missed) Nairn; (penalty missed) Schmidt; (penalty scored) Daly; (penalty missed) Abam

August 21, 2021 Final	Lyon (France)	0–1	(United States) Portland Thorns FC	Portland, Oregon
19:06 PDT		Report	Weaver 87'	Stadium: Providence Park; Referee: Laura Rodriguez

== Statistics ==
=== Appearances, scoring, and discipline ===
As of November 14, 2021.

Players with no appearances not included in the list. Players whose names are struck are no longer with the club. Numbers in parentheses in the Appearances column represent appearances as a substitute.

No.	Pos.	Nat.	Name	Challenge Cup					NWSL Season					Total				
No.	Pos.	Nat.	Name	App.	G	A	Yellow card	Red card	App.	G	A	Yellow card	Red card	App.	G	A	Yellow card	Red card
1	GK	(United States)	Bella Bixby	0	0	0	0	0	16	0	0	0	0	16	0	0	0	0
4	DF	(United States)	Becky Sauerbrunn	3	0	0	0	0	16 (1)	0	0	2	0	19 (1)	0	0	2	0
5	DF	(United States)	Emily Menges	1 (1)	0	0	0	0	20 (1)	0	1	0	0	21 (2)	0	1	0	0
7	FW	(United States)	Simone Charley	4 (1)	1	0	3	1	19 (8)	5	0	1	0	23 (9)	6	0	4	1
9	FW	(United States)	Sophia Smith	3	0	0	0	0	21 (5)	7	1	1	0	24 (5)	7	1	1	0
10	MF	(United States)	Lindsey Horan	3	1	0	1	0	14	2	3	4	0	17	3	3	5	0
11	MF	(Costa Rica)	Raquel Rodríguez	5 (3)	1	0	0	0	22 (3)	2	2	2	0	27 (6)	3	2	2	0
12	FW	(Canada)	Christine Sinclair	3	2	0	0	0	15	5	1	0	0	18	7	1	0	0
14	DF	(Finland)	Natalia Kuikka	5	0	0	0	0	19 (5)	0	1	1	0	24 (5)	0	1	1	0
15	DF	(United States)	Madison Pogarch	4 (2)	0	0	0	0	15 (14)	0	0	1	0	19 (16)	0	0	1	0
18	DF	(United States)	Christen Westphal	4 (2)	0	1	1	0	15 (5)	0	0	0	0	19 (7)	0	1	1	0
19	MF	(United States)	Crystal Dunn	3	0	0	0	0	15 (3)	1	2	1	0	18 (3)	1	2	1	0
20	DF	(United States)	Kelli Hubly	5	0	0	0	0	18 (6)	0	0	0	0	23 (6)	0	0	0	0
22	FW	(United States)	Morgan Weaver	5 (4)	1	0	0	1	19 (7)	1	3	0	0	24 (11)	2	3	0	1
23	GK	(United States)	~~Adrianna Franch~~	5	0	0	0	0	7	0	0	0	0	12	0	0	0	0
23	FW	(United States)	Yazmeen Ryan	0	0	0	0	0	10 (9)	0	0	2	0	10 (9)	0	0	2	0
25	DF	(United States)	Meghan Klingenberg	5	0	1	0	0	22 (2)	0	3	1	0	27 (2)	0	4	1	0
30	MF	(United States)	Celeste Boureille	3 (1)	0	1	0	0	12 (5)	0	0	0	0	15 (6)	0	1	0	0
34	FW	(United States)	Tyler Lussi	4 (1)	1	0	0	0	10 (9)	1	0	0	0	14 (10)	2	0	0	0
36	MF	(United States)	Angela Salem	5 (2)	0	0	0	0	23 (2)	2	0	0	0	28 (4)	2	0	0	0
39	DF	(United States)	Meaghan Nally	1 (1)	0	0	0	0	3 (3)	0	0	0	0	4 (4)	0	0	0	0
40	FW	(United States)	Marissa Everett	2	0	0	0	0	10 (4)	2	0	1	0	12 (4)	2	0	1	0
41	DF	(United States)	Hannah Betfort	0	0	0	0	0	1 (1)	0	0	0	0	1 (1)	0	0	0	0
42	MF	(United States)	Olivia Moultrie	0	0	0	0	0	9 (6)	0	1	2	0	9 (6)	0	1	2	0
45	MF	(United States)	~~Taylor Porter~~	0	0	0	0	0	1 (1)	0	0	0	0	1 (1)	0	0	0	0
46	FW	(United States)	~~Raisa Strom-Okimoto~~	0	0	0	0	0	1 (1)	0	0	0	0	1 (1)	0	0	0	0
				Total	7	3	5	2	Total	28	18	19	0	Total	35	21	24	2

=== Clean sheets ===
As of November 14, 2021.

No.	Pos.	Nat.	Name	Challenge Cup	NWSL Season	Total
1	GK	(United States)	Bella Bixby	0	9	9
23	GK	(United States)	Adrianna Franch	2	4	6
Total				2	13	15

== Awards ==
=== NWSL annual awards ===
Announced November 17, 2021

==== Best XI ====
Pos.	Nat.	Player
MF	(United States)	Angela Salem

==== Second XI ====
Pos.	Nat.	Player
GK	(United States)	Bella Bixby
DF	(United States)	Emily Menges
DF	(United States)	Meghan Klingenberg
MF	(United States)	Lindsey Horan

=== NWSL monthly awards ===
==== Team of the Month ====
Month	Pos.	Nat.	Player	Ref.
May	MF	(United States)	Crystal Dunn	
July	GK	(United States)	Bella Bixby	
July	DF	(United States)	Emily Menges	
July	DF	(United States)	Meghan Klingenberg	
August	DF	(United States)	Emily Menges	
August	MF	(United States)	Angela Salem	
September	MF	(United States)	Angela Salem	
October	MF	(United States)	Angela Salem	

=== NWSL weekly awards ===
==== Player of the Week ====
Week	Nat.	Player	Ref.
4	(United States)	Lindsey Horan	

==== Save of the Week ====
Week	Nat.	Player	Won	Ref.
11	(United States)	Bella Bixby	Won	
12	(United States)	Christen Westphal	Won	
13	(United States)	Bella Bixby	Nom.	
17	(United States)	Bella Bixby	Won	

== Transactions ==
=== NWSL Draft ===
Draft picks are not automatically signed to the team roster. The 2021 NWSL Draft was held on January 13, 2021.

Round	Pick	Nat.	Player	Pos.	College	Status	Ref.
1	6	(United States)	Yazmeen Ryan	MF	TCU	Signed a three-year contract with one-year option.	
2	12	(United States)	Sam Coffey	MF	Penn State	Returned to Penn State; signed a two-year contract in 2022.	
3	22	(United States)	Amirah Ali	FW	Rutgers	Returned to Rutgers; rights traded to San Diego Wave FC.	
4	37	(United States)	Hannah Betfort	DF	Wake Forest	Signed a one-year contract with one-year option.	

=== Transfers in ===
Date	Nat.	Player	Pos.	Previous club	Fee/notes	Ref.
October 22, 2020	(United States)	Crystal Dunn	MF	(United States) North Carolina Courage (via (United States) OL Reign in a three-way trade)	Acquired in exchange for the Thorns' natural first-round pick in the 2022 NWSL Draft, a 2021 international slot, and $250,000 in allocation money.	
October 29, 2020	(Finland)	Natalia Kuikka	DF	(Sweden) Kopparbergs/Göteborg FC	Signed a two-year contract.	
July 2, 2021	(United States)	Taylor Porter	MF	(Spain) UD Granadilla Tenerife	Signed as a National Team Replacement player.	
July 2, 2021	(United States)	Raisa Strom-Okimoto	FW	(United States) Kansas City NWSL	Signed as a National Team Replacement player.	
August 17, 2021	(United States)	Abby Smith	GK	(United States) Kansas City NWSL	Acquired with $150,000 in allocation money in exchange for Adrianna Franch.	

=== Transfers out ===
Date	Nat.	Player	Pos.	Destination club	Fee/notes	Ref.
August 17, 2021	(United States)	Adrianna Franch	GK	(United States) Kansas City NWSL	Traded in exchange for $150,000 in allocation money and Abby Smith.	
August 25, 2021	(United States)	Raisa Strom-Okimoto	FW	None	National Team Replacement contract expired.	
December 8, 2021	(United States)	Simone Charley	FW	(United States) Angel City FC	Traded in exchange for protection from Angel City FC in the 2022 NWSL Expansion Draft, $100,000 in allocation money, and Angel City's natural second-round pick in the 2022 NWSL Draft.	
December 8, 2021	(United States)	Tyler Lussi	FW	(United States) Angel City FC	Traded in exchange for protection from Angel City FC in the 2022 NWSL Expansion Draft, $100,000 in allocation money, and Angel City's natural second-round pick in the 2022 NWSL Draft.	
December 8, 2021	(United States)	Taylor Porter	MF	None	Contract expired.	
December 16, 2021	(United States)	Christen Westphal	DF	(United States) San Diego Wave FC	Traded in exchange for $50,000 in allocation money.	
December 16, 2021	(United States)	Amirah Ali	FW	(United States) San Diego Wave FC	Traded in exchange for $50,000 in allocation money.	
January 27, 2022	(United States)	Lindsey Horan	MF	(France) Olympique Lyon	Loaned through June 2023.	
February 2, 2022	(United States)	Angela Salem	MF	None	Retired.	
