= Hannah Betfort =

American soccer player (born 1999)

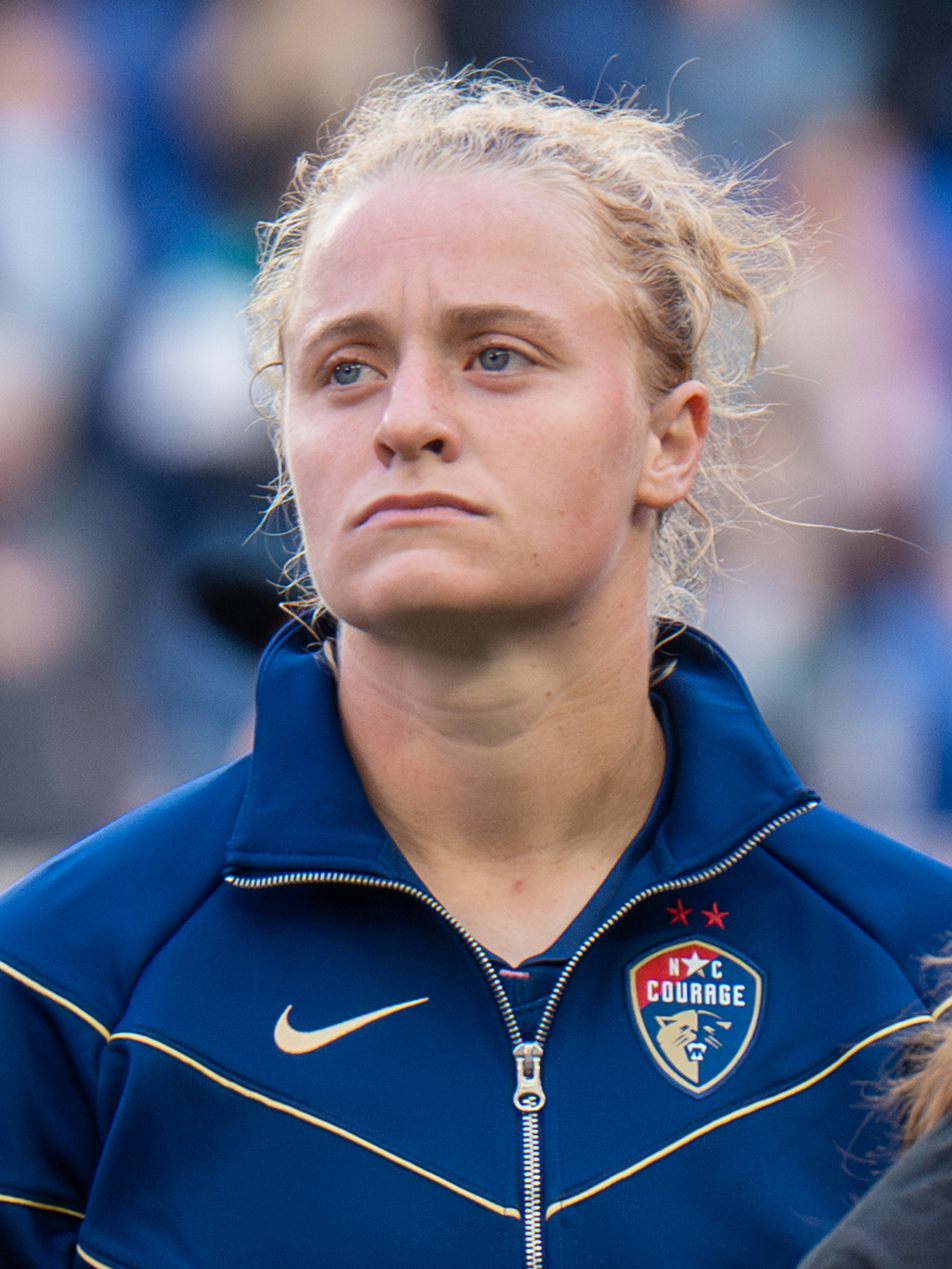
- Betfort with the North Carolina Courage in 2026

Personal information
- Full name: Hannah Claire Betfort
- Date of birth: January 4, 1999 (age 27)
- Place of birth: Charleston, South Carolina
- Height: 5 ft 10 in (1.78 m)
- Position: Forward

Team information
- Current team: North Carolina Courage
- Number: 30

College career
Years	Team	Apps	(Gls)
2017–2020	Wake Forest Demon Deacons	66	(6)

Senior career*
Years	Team	Apps	(Gls)
2021–2023	Portland Thorns	19	(3)
2024	Utah Royals	24	(2)
2025–	North Carolina Courage	41	(2)

International career^{‡}
2018	United States U18		
- * Club domestic league appearances and goals as of 06:51, November 8, 2026 (UTC) ‡ National team caps and goals as of July 9, 2023

Hannah Claire Betfort (born January 4, 1999) is an American professional soccer player plays as a forward for the North Carolina Courage of the National Women's Soccer League (NWSL). She played college soccer for the Wake Forest Demon Deacons and was drafted by Portland Thorns FC in the 2021 NWSL Draft.

== Early life ==
Betfort attended Wando High School in Charleston County, South Carolina, where she played soccer as a forward. She led the team in scoring in each of her first three years and was nominated for the South Carolina state Gatorade Player of the Year award.

=== Wake Forest Demon Deacons ===
Betfort attended Wake Forest University. While not recruited as a soccer player, she received a walk-on invitation to the Demon Deacons soccer team from coach Tony da Luz after attending a camp. As a freshman, she started in 17 of 20 regular-season matches and scored five goals. During her sophomore year she moved positions from forward to defender, playing centre-back and right full-back, and captained the team during her last two seasons.

== Club career ==
=== Portland Thorns ===
Portland Thorns FC selected Betfort with the 37th-overall pick in the 2021 NWSL Draft. She made her professional debut on August 19, 2021, coming in as a substitute against the Houston Dash during the 2021 Women's International Champions Cup. She finished her rookie regular season with one appearance as the Thorns won the NWSL Shield.

Betfort scored her first professional goal on July 16, 2022, in a 5–0 victory against NJ/NY Gotham FC. She finished the 2022 regular season with 1 goal in 7 appearances (1 start) as the Thorns placed second in the standings. She sat out toward the end of the season while Portland went on to win the 2022 NWSL Championship.

The Thorns re-signed Betfort on January 27, 2023, to a two-year contract with an option for an additional year. She appeared in all six games for the Thorns (four starts) during the 2023 NWSL Challenge Cup. On July 21, she had two goals and one assist in a 4–1 win against the San Diego Wave in the Challenge Cup group stage. She finished the 2023 regular season with 2 goals in 10 appearances (4 starts) as Portland again came second in the league. In the playoffs, she came in late for Morgan Weaver in a 1–0 loss to eventual champions NJ/NY Gotham FC in the semifinals.

=== Utah Royals ===
On December 12, 2023, the Thorns traded Betfort, along with a 2024 NWSL Draft pick and allocation money, to the Utah Royals ahead of the 2024 NWSL Expansion Draft for draft protection from the Royals. On July 28, she scored her first goal for the club in a 3–1 win against her former team Portland Thorns in the group stage of the 2024 NWSL x Liga MX Femenil Summer Cup. She had two goals in three games of the Summer Cup as Utah won their group. She finished the 2024 regular season with 2 goals in 24 games (18 starts) as Utah placed 10th of 14 teams. Although Betfort and the Royals negotiated over Betfort's 2025 option, she ultimately did not return to the club.

=== North Carolina Courage ===
On January 17, 2025, Betfort signed a two-year contract with the North Carolina Courage. She scored her first goal for the club with an assist from Manaka Matsukubo in a 2–1 home win over the Houston Dash on June 21.

== International career ==
Betfort was called up to the United States youth national team at the under-18 level in February 2018, appearing in friendlies the next month.

== Career statistics ==
As of August 3, 2025.

Appearances and goals by club, season, and competition
Club	Season	League			Cup (Note: Includes the NWSL Challenge Cup)		Playoffs (Note: Includes NWSL Playoffs)		Total	
Club	Season	Division	Apps	Goals	Apps	Goals	Apps	Goals	Apps	Goals
Portland Thorns FC	2021	NWSL	1	0	0	0	0	0	1	0
Portland Thorns FC	2022	NWSL	7	1	1	0	0	0	8	1
Portland Thorns FC	2023	NWSL	10	2	6	2	1	0	17	4
Portland Thorns FC	Total		18	3	7	2	1	0	26	5
Utah Royals	2024	NWSL	24	2	—		—		24	2
North Carolina Courage	2025	NWSL	11	1	—		—		11	1
Career total			53	6	7	2	1	0	61	8

== Honors ==
Portland Thorns FC

- Women's International Champions Cup: 2021
- NWSL Shield: 2021
- NWSL Championship: 2022
