= Marissa Everett =

American soccer player (born 1997)

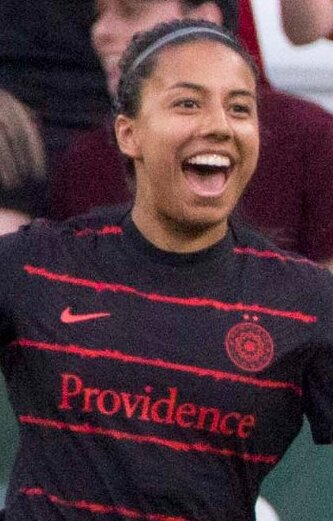
- Everett with the Portland Thorns in 2022

Personal information
- Date of birth: August 29, 1997 (age 29)
- Place of birth: Canyon Lake, California, U.S.
- Height: 5 ft 4 in (1.63 m)
- Position: Forward

Youth career
- 2012–2015: Temescal Canyon High School
- So Cal Blues

College career
Years	Team	Apps	(Gls)
2015–2018	Oregon Ducks	72	(18)

Senior career*
Years	Team	Apps	(Gls)
2019–2022	Portland Thorns FC	26	(4)
- * Club domestic league appearances and goals

Marissa Everett (born August 29, 1997) is an American retired soccer player who played as a forward for Portland Thorns FC.

== Early life ==
Everett attended Temescal Canyon High School, where she played CIF Southern Section Division 6 soccer. She scored the equalizing goal in the 2015 division championship match against Paloma Valley High School and assisted on the match-winning goal, securing Temescal Canyon its first-ever title.

Everett also played youth soccer for Elite Clubs National League club So Cal Blues, where she assisted on the championship-winning goal against McLean 96 Green in the 2016 under-19 girls' US Youth Soccer National Championships.

== College career ==
Everett played for the Oregon Ducks women's soccer team from 2015 to 2018, finishing ranked in the top 10 of the program's history in assists, goals, points, and shots. She totaled 18 goals and 10 assists in 72 appearances. In her studies, she majored in human physiology.

== Club career ==
Everett registered for the 2019 NWSL College Draft but was not selected. She considered playing professionally in Europe but declined an offer after the Thorns showed interest. On May 24, 2019, the Thorns signed her as a national team replacement player. Everett made her professional debut for Portland Thorns FC in the NWSL on May 26, 2019, coming on as a substitute in the 79th minute for Simone Charley against Sky Blue FC, which finished as a 1–0 away win. She made four appearances in her rookie season, and scored her first professional goal in the 85th minute of a 3–0 win against Chicago Red Stars in the Thorns' home opener on June 2, 2019.

The COVID-19 pandemic saw Everett get limited opportunities in 2020. She made four appearances in the 2020 NWSL Challenge Cup and two in the 2020 NWSL Fall Series, the latter of which Portland won.

In the 2021 season, Everett made 10 league appearances and two Challenge Cup appearances, including a career-most six starts and two goals scored. The Thorns won the Challenge Cup and NWSL Shield. She also appeared twice in the 2021 Women's International Champions Cup, which the Thorns won.

On February 3, 2022, Thorns FC announced that it had signed Everett to a new one-year contract with an option for an additional year. Everett made 15 appearances across the season, 10 during league play and four at the 2022 NWSL Challenge Cup. She scored once in NWSL play and once in her one appearance during the 2022 Women's International Champions Cup. The Thorns won the NWSL Championship.

On November 15, 2022, Everett announced her retirement from professional soccer on Twitter. She then resumed studies in nursing school at Concordia University.

== Honors ==
Portland Thorns FC

- NWSL Fall Series: 2020
- NWSL Challenge Cup: 2021
- Women's International Champions Cup: 2021
- NWSL Shield: 2021
- NWSL Championship: 2022
