= Kelli Hubly =

American soccer player (born 1994)

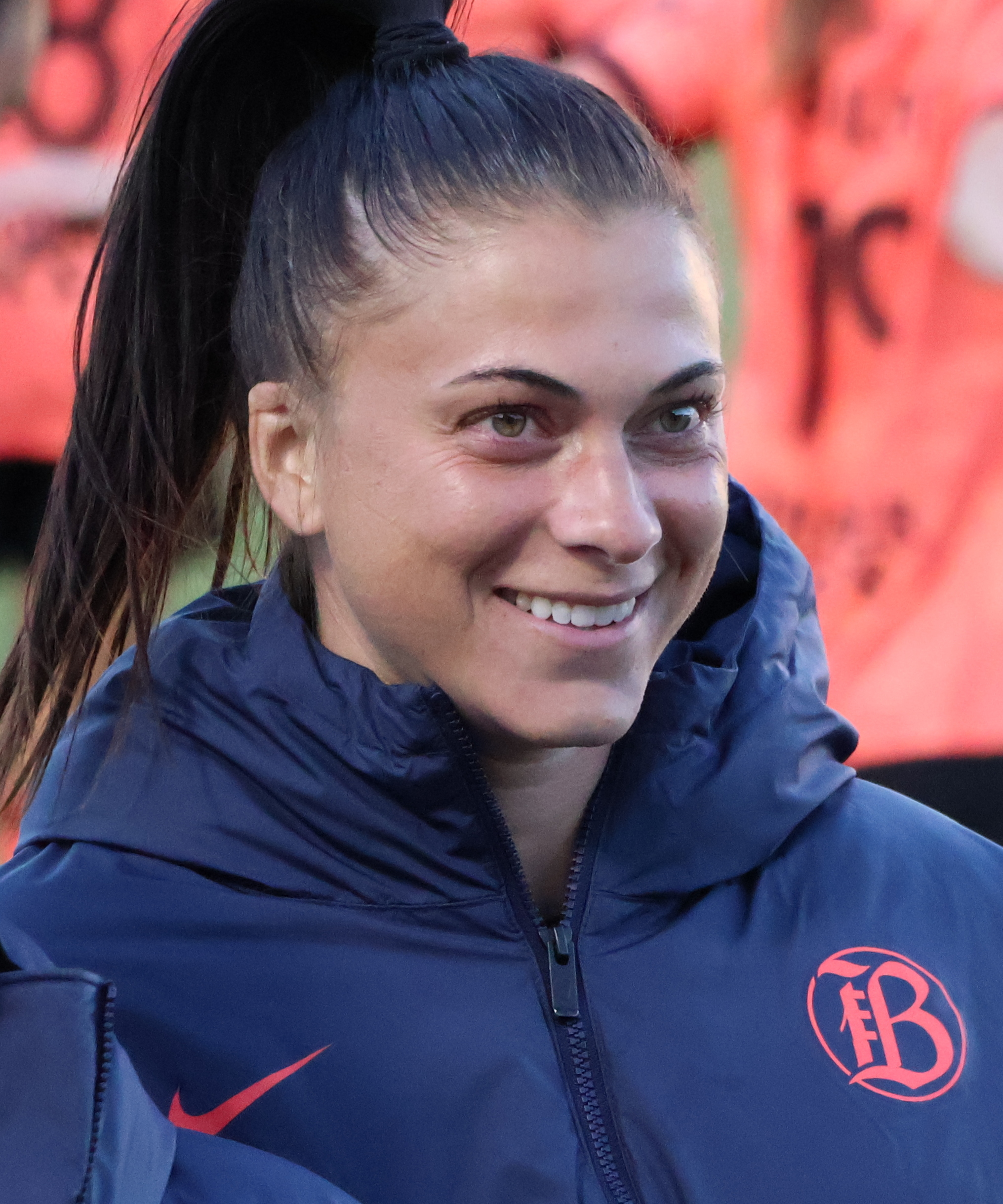
- Hubly with Bay FC in 2026

Personal information
- Full name: Kelli Elizabeth Hubly
- Date of birth: August 9, 1994 (age 32)
- Place of birth: Elk Grove Village, Illinois, U.S.
- Height: 5 ft 9 in (1.75 m)
- Position: Defender

College career
Years	Team	Apps	(Gls)
2012–2014	Kentucky Wildcats	65	(10)
2016	DePaul Blue Demons	18	(1)

Senior career*
Years	Team	Apps	(Gls)
2017–2024	Portland Thorns	97	(2)
2025–2026	Bay FC	21	(1)

International career
2010	United States U17		
- * Club domestic league appearances and goals as of 05:00, November 2, 2026 (UTC)

Kelli Elizabeth Hubly (born August 9, 1994) is an American professional soccer player who plays as a defender. She previously played eight seasons for Portland Thorns FC, winning two NWSL Championships (2017 and 2022) and the NWSL Shield (2021). She played college soccer for the Kentucky Wildcats and the DePaul Blue Demons.

== Early life ==
Hubly was born in Elk Grove Village, Illinois, and attended Elk Grove High School. Growing up she played for the club Sockers F.C. in Chicago, winning the 2010 and 2011 Illinois Cup Championships and the U.S. Youth Soccer Regional Championship in 2011.

== College career ==
Hubly played at the University of Kentucky her first three years (2012-2014) of college, making the All-Freshman Team of the Southeastern Conference (SEC) in 2012, winning the SEC's Freshman of the Week award on October 15, 2012, and making Top Drawer Soccer's National Team of the Week on October 8, 2013. In 2014 she helped the Wildcats advance to the SEC championship game. In 2015 she transferred to DePaul University, red-shirting that year due to NCAA transfer rules. She played the following year (2016), leading the Big East Conference in assists and assists per game, and graduated in 2017.

== Club career ==
=== Portland Thorns ===
Hubly was eligible for but not drafted in the 2017 NWSL College Draft. She instead joined the Portland Thorns as a temporary national team replacement player in 2017. Hubly made her professional debut on July 15, 2017, in the final few minutes of a 1–0 win over the North Carolina Courage. That fall, she won the 2017 NWSL Championship with the Thorns.

She earned her first professional start on March 24, 2018, against the Courage. After playing every minute of the first four games of the 2018 NWSL season due to an injury to usual starter Emily Menges, Hubly was signed by the Thorns on April 27, 2018, to a long-term contract.

Hubly was a key member and frequent starter for the Thorns teams that won the 2020 Fall Series (Community Shield), 2021 NWSL Challenge Cup, 2021 Women's International Champions Cup, and 2021 NWSL Shield. In the 2022 NWSL Season, Hubly played in every minute of every game for the Thorns, helping them win the NWSL Championship, and was included in the 2022 NWSL Best XI Second Team. She played two more seasons for the Thorns, then became a free agent on December 30, 2024.

=== Bay FC ===
Hubly signed a two-year contract with Bay FC on January 31, 2025. On August 23, she scored an own goal for the Washington Spirit and a header goal for Bay in a 3–2 loss to the Spirit before an NWSL record crowd at Oracle Park. She made 21 league appearances for Bay FC before departing from the club at the end of 2026.

== International ==
Hubly was a member of the U.S. Women's National Team at the U-15, U-17, and U-18 levels.

== Honors and awards ==
Portland Thorns FC

- NWSL Champions: 2017, 2022
- NWSL Shield: 2021
- NWSL Challenge Cup: 2021
- NWSL Community Shield: 2020
- Women's International Champions Cup: 2021

Individual

- NWSL Second XI: 2022
- Southeastern Conference All-Freshman Team: 2012
