= Mark Parsons =

English football manager (born 1986)

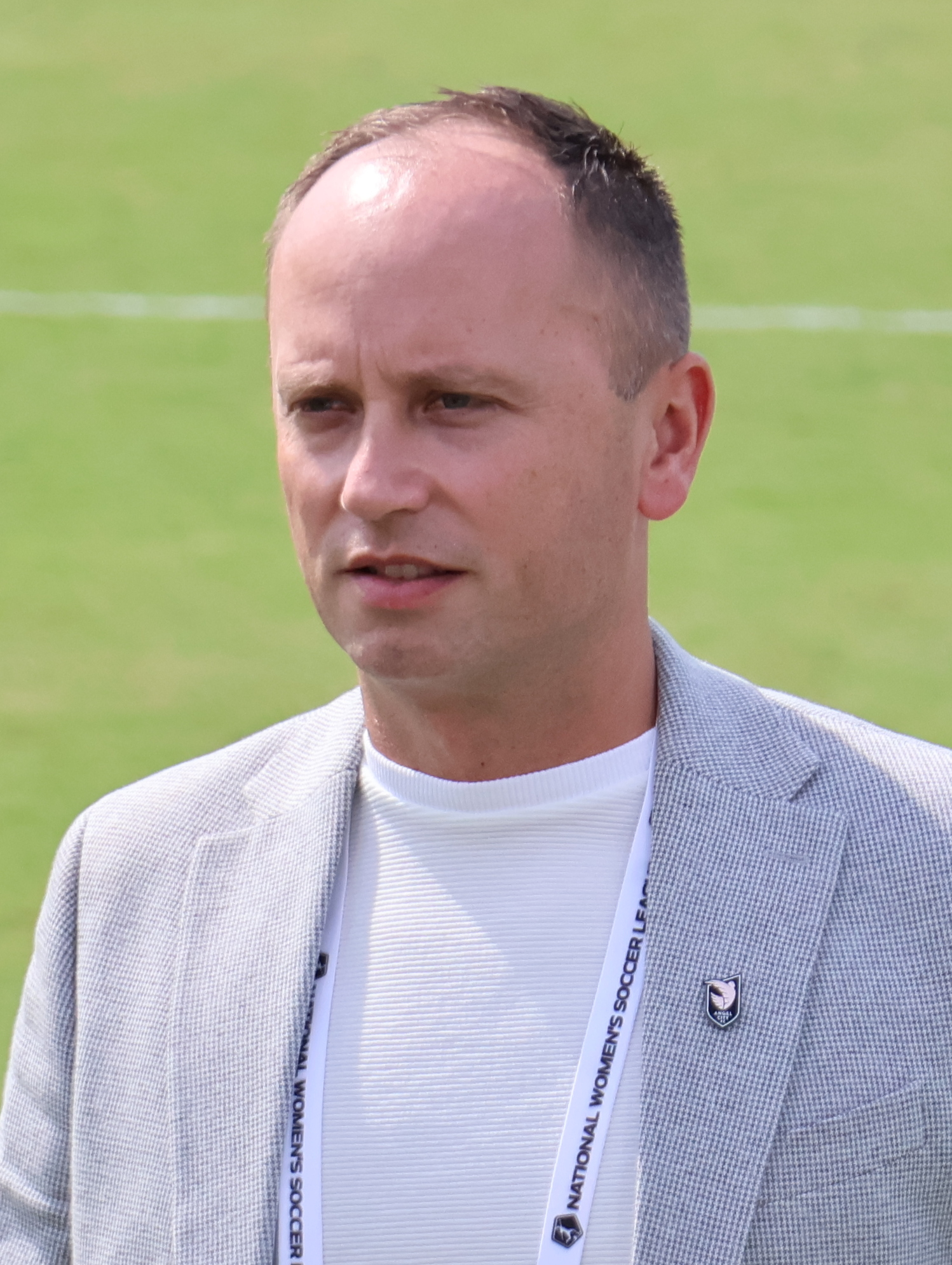
- Parsons in 2025

Personal information
- Full name: Mark Richard David Parsons
- Date of birth: 8 August 1986 (age 40)
- Place of birth: Cranleigh, England

Managerial career
- Years: Team
- 2004–2008: Chelsea (academy assistant)
- 2008–2010: Chelsea Reserves (women's)
- 2010–2012: Culpeper (Va.) SC (technical director)
- 2012: D.C. United Women U-20
- 2013: Washington Spirit Reserves
- 2013–2015: Washington Spirit
- 2016–2021: Portland Thorns
- 2021–2022: Netherlands (women's)
- 2023: Washington Spirit

Mark Richard David Parsons (born 8 August 1986) is an English football manager who is the former head coach of American club Washington Spirit. He previously managed top-level teams including the Netherlands women's national team, the Portland Thorns FC, and the Washington Spirit in a previous stint. Parsons is currently the sporting director of Angel City FC.

Parsons holds USSF and UEFA A and B Licenses, a USSF National Youth License, and a NSCAA Director of Coaching Diploma.

== Early life ==
Parsons was born and raised in Surrey, England, and played youth football in Woking.

== Managerial career ==
=== Chelsea academy, women's reserves ===
Parsons spent six years in multiple coaching roles in England. Parsons's first experience came as a volunteer boys' coach in Surrey, then as a community coach with the Chelsea Foundation. He then held several coaching roles at Chelsea, counting Reece James and Conor Gallagher among the youth players he trained at the academy level.

His first experience as manager was for Chelsea women's reserves from 2008 which he led to an unprecedented treble in his first season.

=== Culpeper (Va.) Soccer Club ===
Parsons, seeking a job in the Virginia area, accepted the role of technical director at Culpeper Soccer Club in 2010 and moved with his wife to the United States.

=== D.C. United Women Under-20s ===
Former Chelsea striker Lianne Sanderson, then playing for D.C. United Women, contacted Parsons about a vacant coaching role with the club's under-20 team. In 2012, Parsons led the D.C. United Women Under-20s to the 2012 Super-20 League final, which they lost to Colorado Rapids Women.

=== Washington Spirit Reserves ===
Parsons was signed by Washington Spirit on 16 March 2013 to manage their reserve team for the 2013 W-League season.

=== Washington Spirit ===
Following the dismissal of Washington Spirit manager Mike Jorden in July 2013, Parsons was promoted to be the first team manager. The team was at the bottom of the table halfway through the 2013 season when Parsons took over, but he led them to their first two home wins in 2013 and into the playoffs in both the 2014 and 2015 seasons.

Parsons stepped down from his position as head coach and general manager of the Washington Spirit on 30 September 2015.

=== Portland Thorns ===
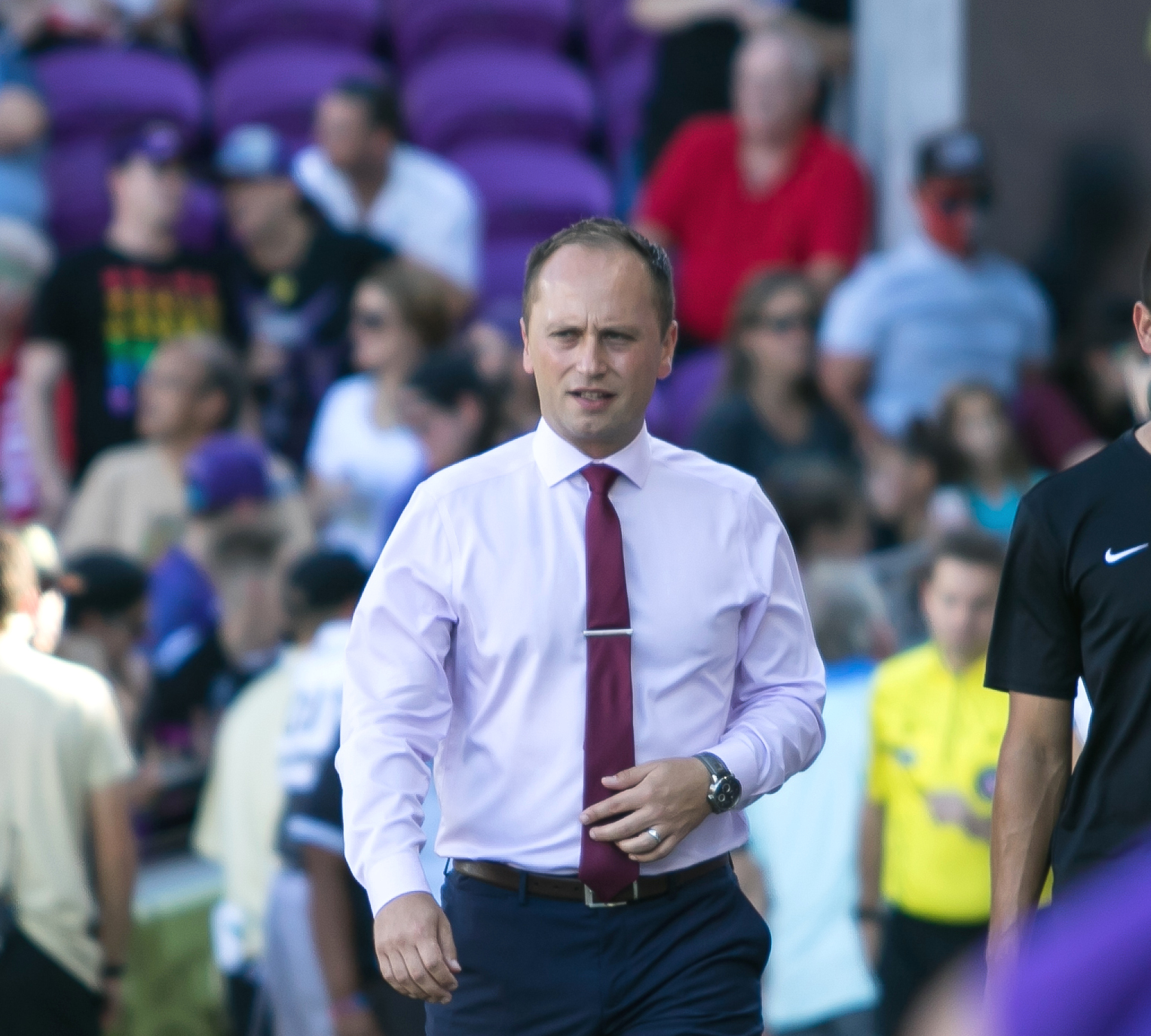
Parsons coaching the Thorns in 2017

On 5 October 2015, Parsons accepted the position as head coach of Portland Thorns FC.

He led a new-look team through a 12-game undefeated streak (a team record) from the beginning of the 2016 season. The team finished as the regular season champions, winning the NWSL Shield, but fell to the Western New York Flash in the Thorns' first-ever home playoff match on 2 October 2016.

The Thorns repeated in securing a home playoff match in the 2017 season despite suffering numerous injuries to the first XI throughout the season, including the long-term absence of star Tobin Heath from a back injury. After beating the Orlando Pride 4–1 in the semifinal, the Thorns won the NWSL championship by defeating the North Carolina Courage 1–0 in the final.

In March 2020 Parsons signed a new multi-year contract with Portland.

In 2021 Parsons led the Thorns to the NWSL Shield for the second time. In addition, the team also won the NWSL Challenge Cup, beating NJ/NY Gotham FC in the final, and the Women's International Champions Cup, beating Olympique Lyonnais in the final. The team also set the NWSL single-season record for shutouts, with 13 out of 24 games played.

Overall, Thorns FC under Parsons made the playoffs all five seasons, won two NWSL Shields and one NWSL Championship, and scored 182 goals, more than any other NWSL team in that time.

=== Netherlands ===
On 20 May 2021, the KNVB announced that Parsons would succeed Sarina Wiegman as head coach of the Netherlands women's national football team after the conclusion of the 2020 Summer Olympics; he continued to coach the Portland Thorns until November 2021 after the season finished, when the position was taken over by Rhian Wilkinson.

On 10 August 2022, Parsons' contract with KNVB was terminated by mutual consent, after the Netherlands team failed in the defence of their 2017 title in the UEFA Women's Euro 2022 competition.

=== Return to the Spirit ===
On 21 November 2022, Parsons was announced as the head coach for the Washington Spirit, succeeding Kris Ward as head coach and Albertin Montoya as interim head coach.

At the conclusion of the 2023 NWSL season the Spirit announced Parsons will not return as head coach.

=== Angel City ===
On 16 January 2025, Parson was announced as the new sporting director for NWSL side, Angel City. As part of this role Parsons also operates as general manager.

== Managerial statistics ==
As of 26 April 2023

Managerial record by team and tenure
Team	From	To	Record							
Team	From	To	P	W	D	L	GF	GA	GD	Win %
Washington Spirit Reserves	2013	2013	15	9	2	4	−	−	—	60.00
Washington Spirit	July 2013	December 2015	57	20	13	24	−	−	—	35.09
Portland Thorns FC	April 2016	November 2021	46	27	10	9	−	−	—	58.70
Netherlands	September 2021	August 2022	18	10	5	3	51	18	+33	55.56
Washington Spirit	21 November 2022	17 October 2023	5	2	2	1	5	4	+1	40.00
Career Total			—	−	−	−	−	−	—	—

== Personal life ==
Parsons is British and also holds US citizenship.

== Honours ==
Portland Thorns FC

- NWSL Championship: 2017
- NWSL Shield: 2016, 2021
- NWSL Challenge Cup: 2021
- NWSL Community Shield: 2020
- WICC Championship: 2021

Individual

- NWSL Coach of the Year: 2016
