= Angela Salem =

American soccer coach and former player

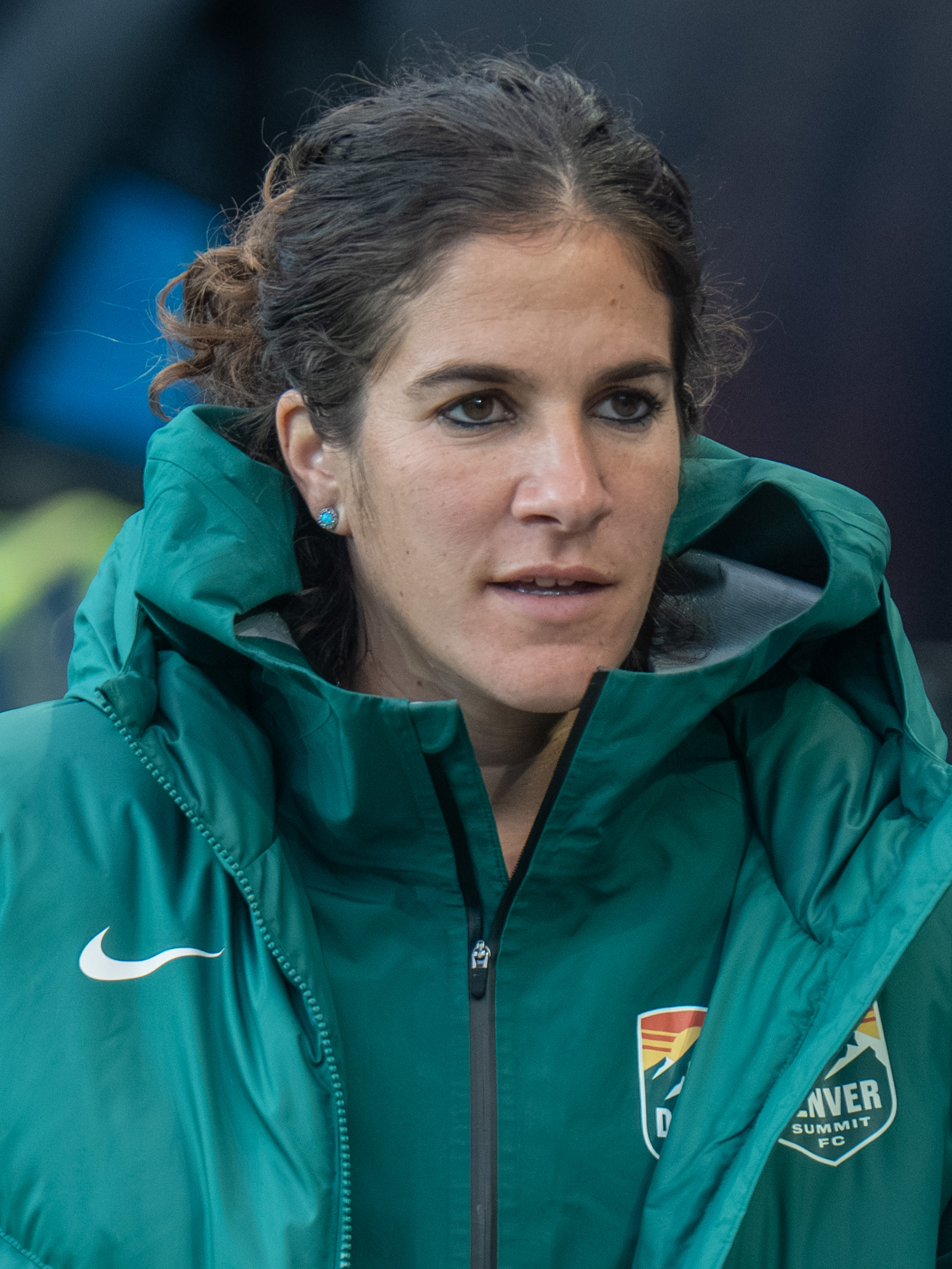
- Salem with the Denver Summit in 2026

Personal information
- Full name: Angela Marguerite Salem
- Date of birth: July 24, 1988 (age 38)
- Place of birth: Akron, Ohio, United States
- Height: 5 ft 5 in (1.65 m)
- Position: Midfielder

Team information
- Current team: Denver Summit (assistant)

Youth career
- Cleveland FC

College career
Years	Team	Apps	(Gls)
2006–2009	Francis Marion Patriots		

Senior career*
Years	Team	Apps	(Gls)
2010	Sky Blue FC	3	(0)
2011	Atlanta Beat	11	(0)
2011	Åland United	7	(1)
2012	Western New York Flash	16	(1)
2012–2013	Newcastle Jets	7	(1)
2013–2014	Western New York Flash	46	(0)
2014	Newcastle Jets	12	(2)
2015	Washington Spirit	16	(0)
2016–2017	Boston Breakers	43	(1)
2018–2021	Portland Thorns	23	(2)

Managerial career
- 2022–2023: Washington Spirit (assistant)
- 2024–2025: Bay FC (assistant)
- 2026–: Denver Summit FC (assistant)
- * Club domestic league appearances and goals

Angela Marguerite Salem (born July 24, 1988) is an American professional soccer coach and former professional player who played as a midfielder. She is currently an assistant coach for Denver Summit FC of the National Women's Soccer League (NWSL). She had a 12-year professional career that included two seasons in Women's Professional Soccer (WPS) and nine seasons in the NWSL.

Salem played college soccer for the Francis Marion Patriots. She began her career in WPS with Sky Blue FC and the Atlanta Beat. She also played for Åland United in Finland and the Newcastle Jets in Australia. In the NWSL, she played for the Western New York Flash, the Washington Spirit, the Boston Breakers, and the Portland Thorns, winning NWSL Shields with the Flash and the Thorns. She was named in the NWSL Best XI with the Thorns after her final season in 2021.

== Early life and education ==
Born in Akron, Ohio, Salem attended Copley High School in Copley, Ohio, where she ended her high school career with 81 goals and 46 assists. She scored 23 goals and recorded 13 assists in her senior year alone, leading Copley to its fourth straight Suburban League title.

Salem also played club soccer for Cleveland FC and was a member of the Ohio Olympic Development Program (ODP) team.

=== Francis Marion University ===
Salem attended Francis Marion University. During her freshman year, she tied the school record by recording 11 assists. As a sophomore, Salem was ranked third in scoring on the team. The midfielder was named team MVP during her sophomore and junior years. She was a co-captain and the team's leading scorer during the 2008 season. She is the first female alumna from Francis Marion University to play professional soccer.

=== Springfield College ===
While playing professional soccer for Portland Thorns FC, Salem earned a master's in education in clinical mental health education from Springfield College, graduating in May 2020. During her masters education, she was the graduate assistant coach for three years under head coach John Gibson within Springfield's women's soccer program.

== Playing career ==
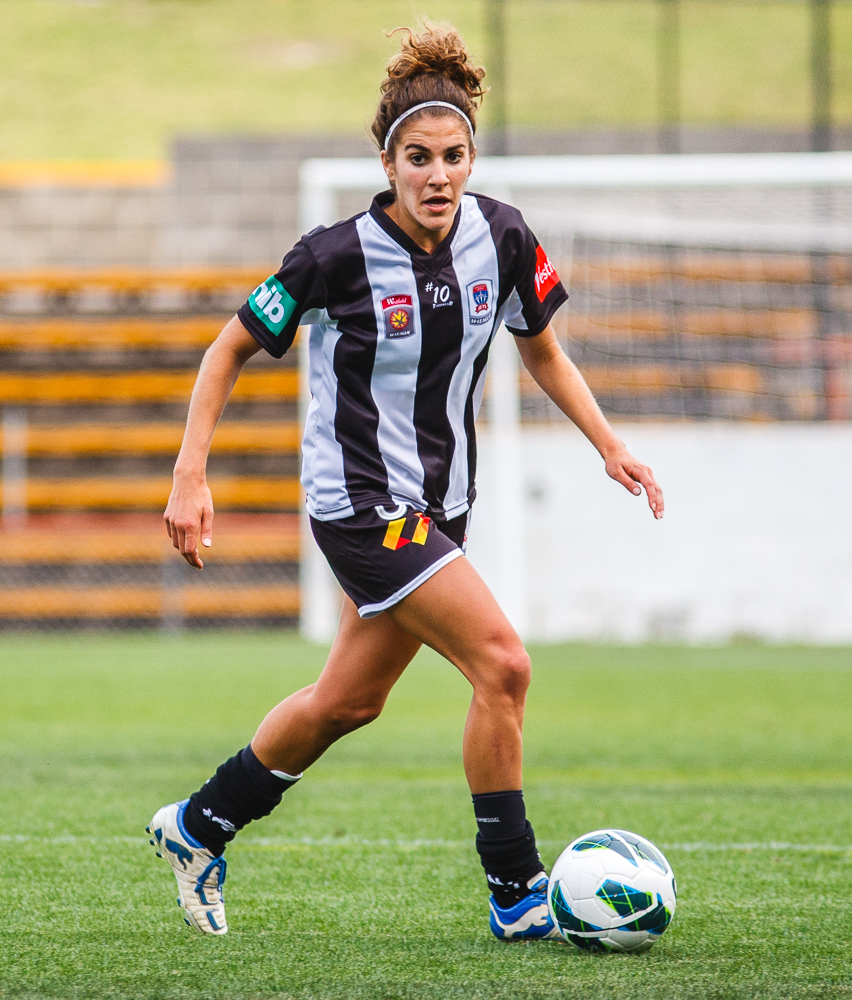
Salem playing for the Newcastle Jets

=== Sky Blue FC (WPS) ===
Salem signed with the Sky Blue FC for the 2010 WPS season. She played three games for the club.

=== Åland United (Naisten Liiga) ===
In 2011 Salem played for Åland United, a Finnish club that plays in the top national women's league, the Naisten Liiga.

=== Atlanta Beat (WPS) ===
In 2011 Salem also played for the Atlanta Beat in the WPS. She started 9 of the 11 games she played.

=== Western New York Flash (WPSL Elite) ===
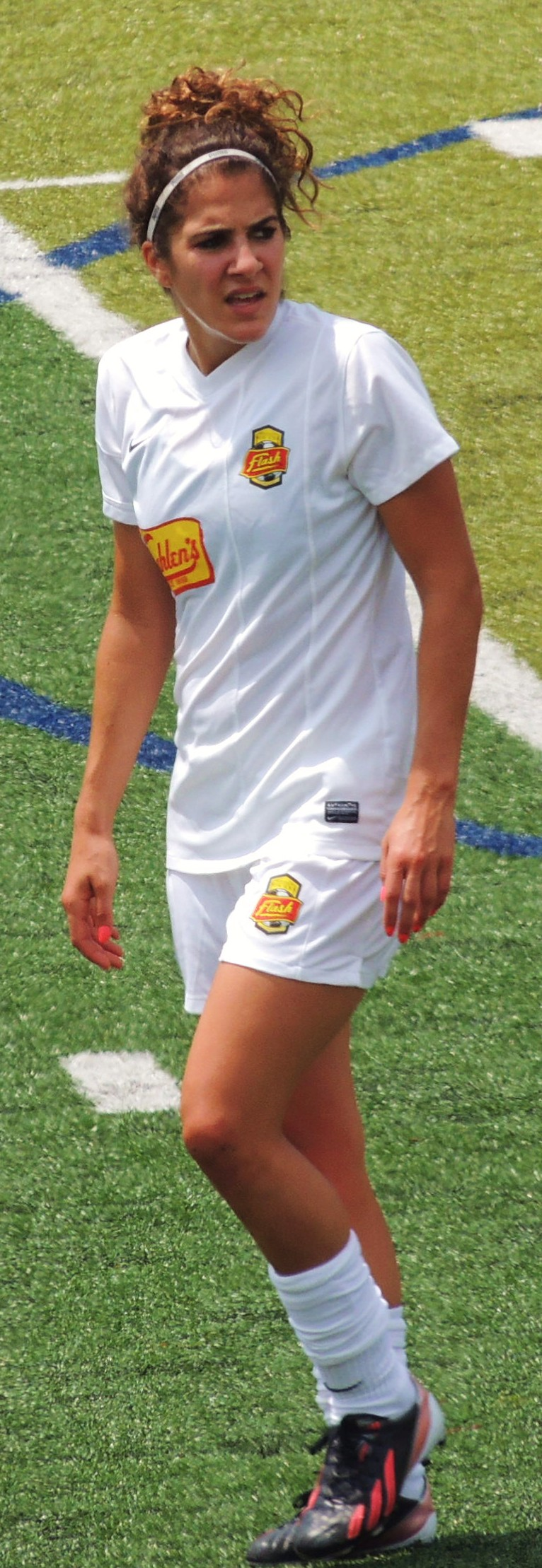
Salem with the Flash in 2013

Salem appeared in all 16 matches for the Western New York Flash in the 2012 WPSL Elite season. She helped the team to its third consecutive championship, scoring the game-winning penalty kick after double overtime in the championship game against the Chicago Red Stars.

=== Newcastle Jets (W-League) ===
Salem played in the Australian W-League for the Newcastle Jets during the 2012–13 season.

=== Western New York Flash (NWSL), 2013–2014 ===
In 2013, Salem signed with the Western New York Flash for the inaugural season of the National Women's Soccer League (NWSL).

=== Return to Newcastle Jets ===
In September 2014 Salem joined Newcastle Jets together with fellow Americans Katherine Reynolds and Tori Huster.

=== Washington Spirit (NWSL), 2015 ===
Following the 2014 NWSL season, the Flash traded Salem and Kat Reynolds to the Washington Spirit for Jordan Angeli and a first-round pick—sixth overall—in the 2015 NWSL College Draft. That pick was later used to select Lynn Williams.

=== Boston Breakers (NWSL), 2016–17 ===
On November 19, 2015, Salem was acquired by the Boston Breakers in exchange for two second-round 2016 NWSL College Draft picks (12 & 20 respectively) from the Washington Spirit. She played for the Breakers in the 2016 and 2017 seasons.

=== Portland Thorns (NWSL), 2018–2021 ===
On January 30, 2018, the Portland Thorns selected Salem as the number fifteen pick in the dispersal draft following the Breakers' cessation of operations. She scored her first goal for the Thorns, her first goal since 2016, on June 5, 2021, against Racing Louisville FC. Salem scored her second goal for the club against rival OL Reign on August 29, 2021, at Lumen Field in Seattle.

In February 2022, Salem announced her retirement from professional soccer.

== Coaching career ==
=== Washington Spirit (2022–2023) ===
On March 23, 2022, the Washington Spirit named Salem, who holds a United States Soccer Federation B license, as an assistant coach. After the Spirit fired head coach Kris Ward, Salem acted as de facto head coach for one game on August 27, 2022. On December 6, 2023, she announced on social media her departure from the Spirit to pursue other opportunities.

=== Bay FC (2024–2025) ===
On December 14, 2023, Salem was announced as part of Bay FC manager Albertin Montoya's inaugural coaching staff. Salem and Montoya worked together when Montoya took on the interim position at the Washington Spirit through the end of the 2022 NWSL season.

=== Denver Summit FC (2026–) ===
On February 12, 2026, Salem was named in Nick Cushing's inaugural coaching staff for Denver Summit FC.

== Honors ==
Western New York Flash

- NWSL Shield: 2013

Portland Thorns FC

- NWSL Shield: 2021
- NWSL Challenge Cup: 2021
- NWSL Community Shield : 2020
- International Champions Cup: 2021

Individual

- NWSL Best XI: 2021

== Personal life ==
As of 12 July 2023, Salem is engaged, and is the mother of a daughter born in October 2022.
