= Raisa Strom-Okimoto =

American soccer player

Personal information
- Date of birth: October 25, 1997 (age 29)
- Place of birth: Aiea, Hawaii, United States
- Height: 1.60 m (5 ft 3 in)
- Position: Forward

College career
Years	Team	Apps	(Gls)
2015–2018	Hawaii Rainbow Wahine	67	(22)

Senior career*
Years	Team	Apps	(Gls)
2019–2020	Utah Royals	3	(0)
2021	Kansas City	0	(0)
2021	Portland Thorns	1	(0)
- * Club domestic league appearances and goals

Raisa Strom-Okimoto (born October 25, 1997) is an American retired professional soccer player who most played as a forward for Utah Royals, Kansas City, and Portland Thorns in the National Women's Soccer League (NWSL).

== Club career ==
Strom-Okimoto made her debut for Utah Royals as a substitute against Portland Thorns in June 2019.

On July 2, 2021, Strom-Okimoto was named as a National Team Replacement player with the Thorns.

== Career statistics ==
Appearances and goals by club, season and competition
Club	Season	League			Cup (Note: Includes NWSL Challenge Cup)		Playoffs (Note: Includes NWSL playoffs)		Other (Note: Includes NWSL Fall Series)		Total	
Club	Season	Division	Apps	Goals	Apps	Goals	Apps	Goals	Apps	Goals	Apps	Goals
Utah Royals	2019	NWSL	3	0	—		—		—		3	0
Utah Royals	2020	NWSL	—		3	0	—		2	0	5	0
Kansas City	2021	NWSL	0	0	1	0	—		—		1	0
Portland Thorns FC	2021	NWSL	1	0	0	0	0	0	—		1	0
Career total			4	0	4	0	0	0	2	0	10	0
