= Simone Charley =

American soccer player (born 1995)

- Charley with the Chicago Stars in 2026

Personal information
- Full name: Simone Naomi Charley
- Date of birth: February 4, 1995 (age 31)
- Place of birth: Boston, Massachusetts, United States
- Height: 1.73 m (5 ft 8 in)
- Position: Striker

Team information
- Current team: Chicago Stars
- Number: 18

Youth career
- 2009–2012: Spain Park High School
- Birmingham Legends

College career
Years	Team	Apps	(Gls)
2013–2017	Vanderbilt Commodores	76	(25)

Senior career*
Years	Team	Apps	(Gls)
2019–2021	Portland Thorns	30	(5)
2019–2020	→ Canberra United (loan)	11	(5)
2021–2023	Angel City	22	(2)
2024–2025	Orlando Pride	9	(1)
2026	Newcastle United	1	(0)
2026	Brooklyn FC	0	(0)
2026–	Chicago Stars	9	(1)

International career
2017	United States U23		
- * Club domestic league appearances and goals as of 05:41, November 2, 2026 (UTC)

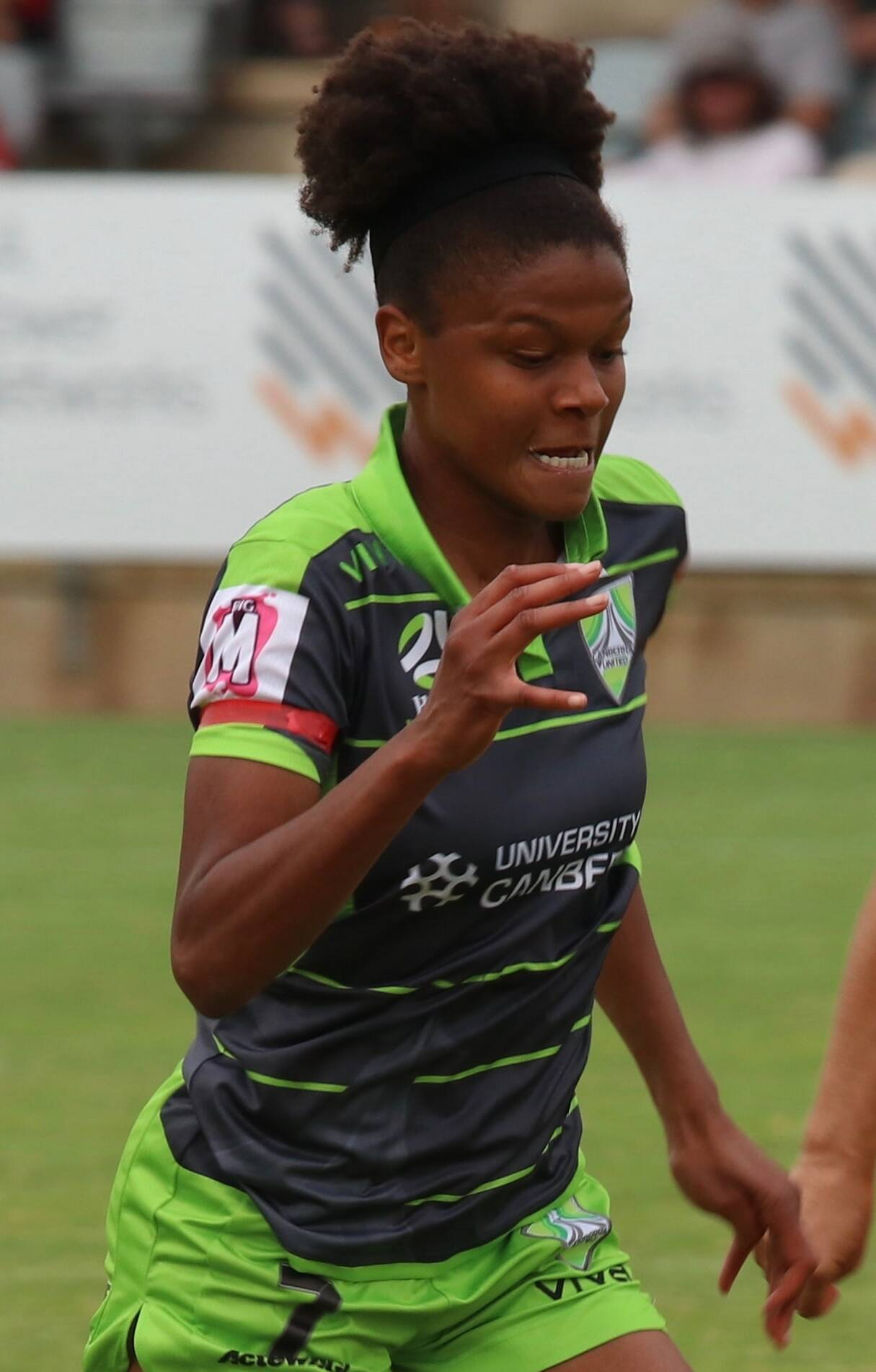
Charley with Canberra United in 2019

Simone Naomi Charley (born February 4, 1995) is an American professional soccer player who plays as a striker for Chicago Stars FC of the National Women's Soccer League (NWSL). A former two-sport athlete, Charley competed in soccer and track and field at Vanderbilt University. She has previously played for NWSL clubs Portland Thorns FC, Angel City FC, and the Orlando Pride, as well as Australian club Canberra United FC and English club Newcastle United.

== Early life ==
Charley was born to Sharon and Bobby Charley in Boston, Massachusetts, and grew up in Hoover, Alabama. Her maternal family is originally from Montserrat. She was born into a sports family, her older sister Nicole having been a triple jumper at Auburn, her older brother Myles a triple jumper and long jumper at Troy and her cousin Damian an American football player at Vanderbilt.

Charley is a natural athlete herself, and excelled at the high school and university level in both soccer and track and field. During her high school career she won nine state championships in both sports, was named 2011 state Gatorade Player of the Year (soccer) and 2012 Birmingham News Female Athlete of the Year. She also excelled academically.

== College career ==
Charley attended Vanderbilt University for five years. During that time she was a student-athlete for the Vanderbilt Commodores in soccer, indoor track and outdoor track. Due to her prolific athletic career, Charley was named to the 2019 Southeastern Conference Class of Women's Legends. While at Vanderbilt University Charley earned a bachelor's degree with a double-majored in psychology and sociology and a master's degree in medicine, health and society.

=== College soccer, 2013–2017 ===
During her soccer career at Vanderbilt, Charley made 76 appearances and finished with 25 goals and 18 assists. Her 2013 freshman year saw her finish the year as the team's leader in points and goals. She was named to the SEC All-Freshman Team and SEC First-Year Academic Honor Roll. Charley repeated her team leader in goals her sophomore year and was named to the First Team All-SEC team and Fall SEC Academic Honor Roll. Her 2015-year saw her named to the All-South Region First Team and Second Team All-SEC. Charley redshirted the 2016 season in soccer. She returned to the soccer team for her senior year in 2017. She finished the year as team leader in points. She was named to the Second Team All-SEC and All-Southeast Region and made the Fall SEC Academic Honor Roll.

=== College Track and Field, 2014–2017 ===
While attending Vanderbilt Charley also competed in both indoor and outdoor seasons of track and field in the triple jump. Her freshman indoor season saw her post the second-best mark on Vanderbilt's all-time performance for the triple jump (41'8.50"). She broke her own school record in the 2014 outdoor season, setting a then lifetime best of (43'2.50"), missing qualification for the IAAF World Championship by one centimeter. She finished her freshman year named to the 2014 Outdoor NCAA Second-Team All-American and 2014 USTFCCCA All-Academic Team. During her sophomore year she again broke both her own indoor and outdoor school record in the triple jump, with jumps of (43'5.25") and (43'8.55") respectively. Indoor she had a fifth best nationally at the time which earned her All-SEC honors. Charley also earned NCAA First-Team All-American honors for both her indoor and outdoor 2015 season. She repeated this double NCAA First Team All-American honors during her junior 2016 seasons. She also again repeated her breaking of her own person and school records with jumps of (44'0") in her indoor season and (45'2.75") during her outdoor season. Her final track season was the 2017 indoor season, where Charley again broke her school and personal record with a triple jump of (44'5.25"). She finished her last season earning a third consecutive indoor NCAA First Team All-American honor.

== Club career ==
=== Portland Thorns ===
Charley went undrafted in the 2018 NWSL College Draft. She was however picked up by the Portland Thorns FC, making the practice squad for 2018 as a non-roster invitee. She was signed by the team in May 2019 as a supplemental player. Charley made her first start for Thorns FC on May 25, 2019, against Sky Blue FC. She provided two assists during her second start against the Chicago Red Stars.

Charley scored her first professional goal during the 2020 NWSL Challenge Cup, and scored a second goal during the 2020 NWSL Fall Series. On October 30, 2020, Thorns FC announced that the club had offered Charley a new contract. On January 29, 2021, Thorns FC announced that the club had signed Charley to a two-year contract. Charley scored five goals in 19 appearances in the 2021 season, tied for second most on the team with Christine Sinclair.

==== Canberra United (loan) ====
After the 2019 season, Thorns FC loaned Charley to Australian W-League club Canberra United FC, where Charley scored five goals in 11 appearances.

=== Angel City ===
On December 8, 2021, Thorns FC traded Charley and forward Tyler Lussi to Angel City FC in exchange for $100,000 in allocation money, a second-round pick in the 2022 NWSL Draft, and immunity from Angel City in the 2022 NWSL Expansion Draft. In her 2022 season, Charley scored two regular-season goals and one Challenge Cup goal in 23 total appearances. She also drew two penalties.

On April 11, 2023, Angel City announced that Charley had ruptured an Achilles tendon in her left foot during a match against Orlando Pride on April 2 and placed her on the team's season-ending injury list. On January 22, 2024, Angel City announced that Charley would not be returning to the club.

=== Orlando Pride ===
On January 24, 2024, the Orlando Pride announced that they had signed Charley to a two-year contract. On March 10, 2024, Orlando Pride announced that Charley had been placed on the season-ending injury list for the 2024 season after rupturing her Achilles tendon for the second time within a year, this time in her right foot, during preseason training.

She returned to the field in August 2025 after having gone 854 days without playing in a competitive match. On October 3, 2025, she scored her first goal in three years to help Orlando salvage a late draw with the Houston Dash. At the end of the year, Charley departed from the Pride as a free agent. She had made 9 league appearances from the club in her one active season of play.

=== Newcastle United ===
In February 2026, Charley signed a contract with English club Newcastle United through the end of the 2025–26 Women's Super League 2 season.

=== Chicago Stars ===
In July 2026, Charley was signed by USL Super League club Brooklyn FC. Shortly thereafter, she was transferred back to the NWSL, joining the Chicago Stars on a contract through the end of the 2026 league season.

== Personal life ==
Charley was elected as the vice president of the NWSL Players Association in 2024.

== Career statistics ==
=== College summary ===
Team	Season	Total		
Team	Season	Division	Apps	Goals
Vanderbilt Commodores	2013	Div. I	17	5
Vanderbilt Commodores	2014	Div. I	19	9
Vanderbilt Commodores	2015	Div. I	21	7
Vanderbilt Commodores	2016	Div. I	0	0
Vanderbilt Commodores	2017	Div. I	19	4
Total			76	25

=== Club summary ===
As of January 24, 2024

Club	Season	League			Cup (Note: Includes NWSL Challenge Cup)		Playoffs (Note: Includes NWSL Playoffs)		Other		Total	
Club	Season	Division	Apps	Goals	Apps	Goals	Apps	Goals	Apps	Goals	Apps	Goals
Portland Thorns	2019	NWSL	11	0	—		0	0	—		11	0
Portland Thorns	2020	NWSL	—		6	1	—		4 (Note: Includes NWSL Fall Series)	1	10	2
Portland Thorns	2021	NWSL	19	5	4	1	1	0	—		24	6
Portland Thorns	Total		30	5	10	2	1	0	4	1	45	8
Canberra United (loan)	2019–20	W-League	11	5	—		—		—		11	5
Angel City FC	2022	NWSL	20	2	3	1	—		—		23	3
Angel City FC	2023	NWSL	2	0	0	0	0	0	—		2	0
Angel City FC	Total		22	2	3	1	0	0	0	0	25	3
Orlando Pride	2024	NWSL	0	0	—		0	0	0	0	0	0
Career total			63	12	13	3	1	0	4	1	81	16

== Honors and awards ==
Portland Thorns FC

- International Champions Cup: 2021
- NWSL Shield: 2021
- NWSL Challenge Cup: 2021

Orlando Pride

- NWSL Shield: 2024
- NWSL Championship: 2024
