= Morgan Weaver =

American soccer player (born 1997)

- Weaver with the Portland Thorns in 2026

Personal information
- Full name: Morgan Victoria Weaver
- Date of birth: October 18, 1997 (age 29)
- Place of birth: Renton, Washington, U.S.
- Height: 5 ft 10 in (1.78 m)
- Position: Forward

Team information
- Current team: Portland Thorns
- Number: 22

College career
Years	Team	Apps	(Gls)
2016–2019	Washington State Cougars	85	(43)

Senior career*
Years	Team	Apps	(Gls)
2020–	Portland Thorns	87	(21)

International career^{‡}
2018–2019	United States U23		
2021–	United States	2	(0)
- * Club domestic league appearances and goals as of 18:03, November 11, 2026 (UTC) ‡ National team caps and goals as of November 30, 2021

Morgan Victoria Weaver (born October 18, 1997) is an American professional soccer player who plays as a forward for the Portland Thorns of the National Women's Soccer League (NWSL).

== College career ==
Weaver played college soccer at Washington State from 2016 to 2019. She scored her first collegiate goals on September 4, 2016, recording a hat-trick against North Dakota State. Weaver was named to the All-Pac-12 Freshman Team in 2016. In 2017, she was named to the All-Pac-12 third team. She was named to the All-Pac-12 first team in 2018, and was named to the All-Pac-12 second team in 2019, when she led Washington State to the final four of the NCAA tournament. She was named WSU's 2019 Sportsperson of the Year by Cougfan.com.

== Club career ==
=== Portland Thorns ===
On January 16, 2020, Weaver was selected as the second overall pick in the 2020 NWSL College Draft by the Portland Thorns FC. She made her professional debut for Portland Thorns FC on June 27, 2020, in the 2020 NWSL Challenge Cup, coming on as a substitute in the 54th minute for Tyler Lussi against North Carolina Courage. She scored her first professional goal on July 17, 2020, against North Carolina Courage.

In the 2021 International Champions Cup, Weaver scored the winning goal against Lyon in the final. The Thorns' 1–0 victory was their first International Champions Cup title.

In 2022, Weaver signed a new deal with the Thorns to keep her through 2024, with an option for 2025. In the 2022 regular season, Weaver made 20 appearances (13 starts) and tallied the second-most goals on the team (7) with three assists.

In October 2023, Weaver was voted Supporters' Player of the Year by the Rose City Riveters, the supporters group of the Portland Thorns.

On May 1, 2024, Weaver was injured in a match against Bay FC. She underwent arthroscopic surgery on her right knee and was placed on the 45-day disabled list. She was sidelined throughout the summer recovering from this injury. On July 26, Weaver joined MLS broadcaster Jake Zivin to provide color commentary for the broadcast of the 'Green is Gold' charity match featuring players from the Portland Timbers and Portland Thorns. Weaver returned to the pitch on September 13, coming off the bench in a 1–0 loss to the Chicago Red Stars. Coinciding with her return from injury, the Thorns announced that Weaver had signed a contract extension with the club through 2028. On October 11, she scored the opening goal in a 2–0 victory over the Orlando Pride, helping hand the league leaders their first loss of the season.

== International career ==
Weaver received a call-up to the United States national under-23 team in March 2019.

Weaver received her first call up to the United States national team in November 2021.

== Career statistics ==
=== Club ===
As of May 1, 2024

Appearances and goals by club, season and competition
Club	Season	League			Cup (Note: Includes the NWSL Challenge Cup)		Playoffs (Note: Includes NWSL Playoffs)		Other		Total	
Club	Season	Division	Apps	Goals	Apps	Goals	Apps	Goals	Apps	Goals	Apps	Goals
Portland Thorns FC	2020	NWSL	—		6	1	—		3 (Note: Includes the NWSL Fall Series)	0	9	1
Portland Thorns FC	2021	NWSL	19	1	5	1	1	0	—		25	2
Portland Thorns FC	2022	NWSL	20	7	6	1	2	0	—		28	8
Portland Thorns FC	2023	NWSL	22	7	5	3	1	0	—		28	10
Portland Thorns FC	2024	NWSL	7	1	—		—		—		7	1
Career total			68	16	22	6	4	0	3	0	97	22

=== International ===
As of match played November 30, 2021

National Team	Year	Apps	Goals
United States	2021	2	0
Total		2	0

== Honors ==
Portland Thorns FC

- NWSL Challenge Cup: 2021
- NWSL Championship: 2022
