= Emily Menges =

American soccer player (born 1992)

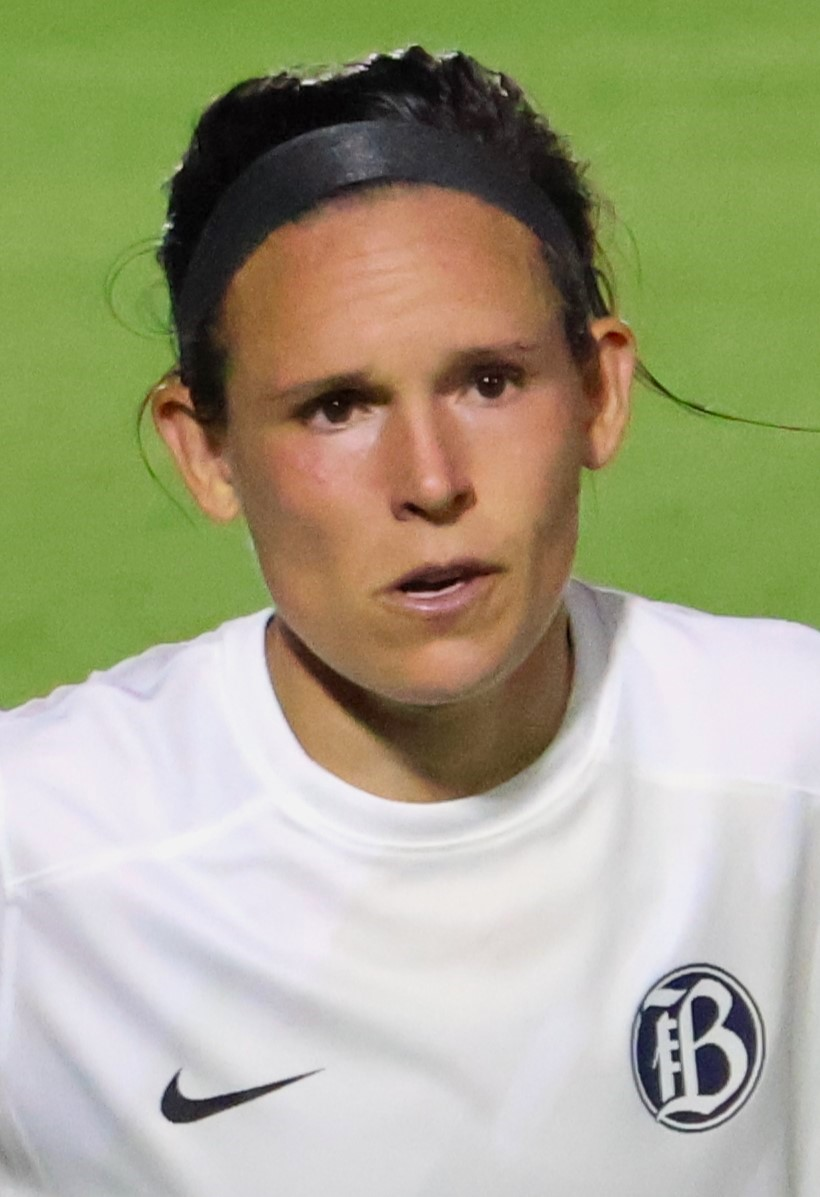
- Menges with Bay FC in 2024

Personal information
- Full name: Emily Townsend Menges
- Date of birth: July 28, 1992 (age 34)
- Place of birth: Garden City, New York, United States
- Height: 5 ft 7 in (1.70 m)
- Position: Center back

Youth career
- Albertson Fury '91

College career
Years	Team	Apps	(Gls)
2010–2013	Georgetown Hoyas	84	(0)

Senior career*
Years	Team	Apps	(Gls)
2014–2023	Portland Thorns	160	(0)
2019–2020	→ Melbourne Victory (loan)	12	(0)
2024–2026	Bay FC	32	(0)

International career
2013	United States U23		
- * Club domestic league appearances and goals as of 06:20, 04:59, November 2, 2026 (UTC)

Emily Townsend Menges (born July 28, 1992) is an American professional soccer player who plays as a center back. She previously played in the National Women's Soccer League (NWSL) for the Portland Thorns, with whom she won two NWSL Shields and two NWSL Championships, and Bay FC.

== Early life ==
Menges was born in Garden City, New York and attended Garden City High School. She played for the Albertson Fury '91, winning three consecutive Eastern New York Youth Soccer Association (ENYYSA) State Open Cups from 2009 to 2011.

== College career ==
Menges attended Georgetown University. She finished her college career as one of the most decorated players in program history, earning the Big East Defensive Player of the Year award and NSCAA First Team All-American honors in 2013, in addition to being a three-time All-Big East selection. She captained the Hoyas' defense to 23 shutouts over her final two seasons, including a school-record 13 clean sheets as a junior in 2012. Menges appeared in 84 games (83 starts), scored two goals, and helped the Georgetown defense post 40 shutouts. She was a MAC Hermann Trophy semi-finalist in 2012 and 2013.

== Club career ==
Menges played for the Long Island Fury, winning the second-division Women's Premier Soccer League (WPSL) national championship in 2009.

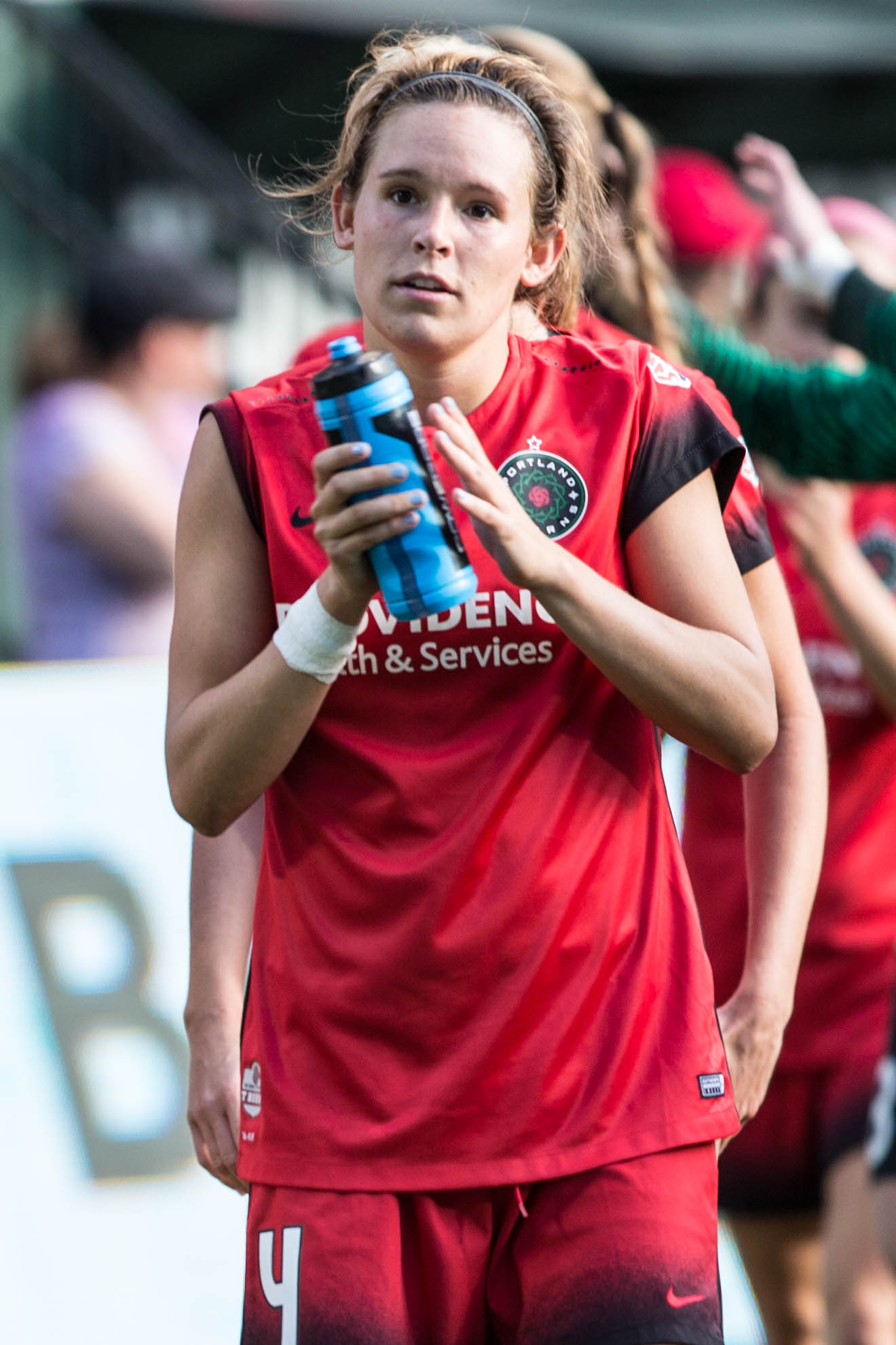
Menges with the Thorns in 2016

Portland Thorns FC selected Menges with the 25th overall pick in the third round of the 2014 NWSL College Draft. She made her first appearance with the Thorns on April 12, 2014, helping the team record a shutout in a 1–0 road win against the Houston Dash. Menges was a starting centerback for the Thorns when they won the 2016 NWSL Shield and the 2017 NWSL Championship. She has been a favorite of fans, winning the Supporters' Player of the Year award in 2016. She came third in NWSL Defender of the Year voting in the 2021 season.

She was acquired by Bay FC in December 2023. She spent three years with the club before departing as a free agent at the end of 2026.

== International career ==
In December 2013, Menges was called up to participate in training camp with the U.S. Under-23 Women's National Team. In November 2016, Menges was called into training camp with the U.S. women's national soccer team.

== Personal life ==
Menges is the vice-president of the I'm Not Done Yet Foundation, an organization started by the Menges family after her brother Bobby's death in 2017. I'm Not Done Yet is dedicated to helping pediatric and young adult patients with cancer and other chronic illnesses.

Menges married former teammate and coach Rhian Wilkinson on January 1, 2025. Their daughter, Rowan, was born on February 7, 2026.

== Honors ==
Long Island Fury

- WPSL national championship: 2009

Portland Thorns FC

- International Champions Cup: 2021
- NWSL Championship: 2017, 2022
- NWSL Shield: 2016, 2021

Individual

- NWSL Best XI – 2016
- NWSL Second XI – 2017
- Team Most Valuable Player (Portland Thorns) – 2016
- Supporters' Player of the Year (Portland Thorns) – 2016
- First Team All-American (NCSAA) – 2013
- MAC Hermann Trophy semi-finalist – 2012, 2013
- Big East Defensive Player of the Year – 2013
