= 2021 Women's International Champions Cup =

Tournament details
- Host country: United States
- Dates: August 18 – 21
- Teams: 4 (from 2 confederations)
- Venue: 1 (in 1 host city)

Final positions
- Champions: (United States) Portland Thorns FC
- Runners-up: (France) Lyon
- Third place: (Spain) Barcelona
- Fourth place: (United States) Houston Dash

Tournament statistics
- Matches played: 4
- Goals scored: 15 (3.75 per match)

The 2021 Women's International Champions Cup was a friendly tournament of women's association football matches. It was the third edition of the Women's International Champions Cup and took place in Portland, Oregon, United States, from August 18 to 21, 2021. Portland Thorns FC emerged the winners, defeating Olympique Lyonnais Féminin 1–0 in the final, while FC Barcelona Femení won the third-place match.

== Teams ==
On the basis of their results in 2020, four teams participated in the tournament.

Nation	Team	Reason for qualification
United States	Portland Thorns FC	Won 2020 NWSL Fall Series
France	Lyon	Won 2019-20 UEFA Women's Champions League and 2019–20 Division 1 Féminine
Spain	Barcelona	Won 2019–20 Primera División Femenina
United States	Houston Dash	Won 2020 NWSL Challenge Cup

== Venue ==
Portland, Oregon	Location of the host city of the 2021 Women's International Champions Cup.
Providence Park	Location of the host city of the 2021 Women's International Champions Cup.
Capacity: 25,218	Location of the host city of the 2021 Women's International Champions Cup.

== Bracket ==
Semi-finals
August 18 – Portland, OR
(France) Lyon	3
(Spain) Barcelona	2
August 18 – Portland, OR
(United States) Portland Thorns FC (p)	2 (3)
(United States) Houston Dash	2 (1)

Final
August 21 – Portland, OR
(France) Lyon	0
(United States) Portland Thorns FC	1
Third place play-off
August 21 – Portland, OR
(Spain) Barcelona	3
(United States) Houston Dash	2

== Matches ==
=== Semi-finals ===
August 18, 2021
17:36 PDT

Barcelona (Spain)	2–3	(France) Lyon
Caldentey 9', 63'	Report	Majri 20'; Henry 27'; Malard 85'

Providence Park, Portland, Oregon
Referee: Katja Koroleva (United States)

August 18, 2021
20:06 PDT

Portland Thorns FC (United States)	2–2	(United States) Houston Dash
Kuikka 51'; Moultrie 58'	Report	Groom 17', 41'
Penalties
Klingenberg (penalty scored); Kuikka (penalty missed); Moultrie (penalty scored); Charley (penalty scored)	3–1	(penalty missed) Nairn; (penalty missed) Schmidt; (penalty scored) Daly; (penalty missed) Abam

Providence Park, Portland, Oregon
Referee: Adorae Monroy (United States)

=== Third place play-off ===
August 21, 2021
16:36 PDT

Barcelona (Spain)	3–2	(United States) Houston Dash
Crnogorčević 34'; Putellas 72' (pen.), 78'	Report	Fernández 48' (o.g.); Groom 62'

Providence Park, Portland, Oregon
Referee: Samantha Martinez (United States)

=== Final ===
August 21, 2021
19:06 PDT

Lyon (France)	0–1	(United States) Portland Thorns FC
	Report	Weaver 87'

Providence Park, Portland, Oregon
Referee: Laura Rodriguez (United States)

== See also ==
- Women's Champions League (UEFA)
- National Women's Soccer League (United States)
- Primera División (Spain)
- Division 1 (France)
