= NWSL Shield =

Trophy for the NWSL team with the best regular season record

- Awarded for: National Women's Soccer League team with the best record in the regular season
- Presented by: National Women's Soccer League
- First award: 2013
- Currently held by: Gotham FC (2026) (1st shield)

Highlights
- Most awards: North Carolina Courage; Seattle Reign FC (3 shields)
- Website: http://nwslsoccer.com

Gotham FC celebrating winning the NWSL shield in 2026

The NWSL Shield is an annual award given to the National Women's Soccer League (NWSL) team with the best regular season record as determined by the NWSL points system. The NWSL Shield has been awarded annually since 2013 and is recognized as a major trophy by the league.

The North Carolina Courage and Seattle Reign FC, each with three NWSL Shields since the league's inception in 2013, are tied for the most shields won by any NWSL team. The Kansas City Current are the current (2025) winners.

In 2024, CONCACAF announced that the NWSL Shield winner and runner-up qualified by virtue of those accomplishments for the 2024–25 CONCACAF W Champions Cup, the inaugural edition of that competition.

== History ==
When the NWSL was launched in 2013, the league's format was set up similarly to other contemporary North American leagues. After the regular season, the NWSL playoffs were held, with the top four teams vying for a spot in the postseason championship match. The club with the most regular-season points was awarded the NWSL Shield and earned the top seed in the playoffs.

A new NWSL Shield trophy, designed by Tiffany & Co., was unveiled by the league in 2024. It includes a depiction of a soccer ball and uses 24-karat gold vermeil and sterling silver.

=== Point system and tiebreakers ===
Since the 2013 inaugural season, the system of awarding points in the NWSL is the same as the international standard: three points for a win, one for a draw, and no points for a loss.

Since the 2022 season, in the event of an end-of-season tie in total accumulated points, the following tie-breakers are used among all teams with the same number of points:

1. Greater goal difference across the entire regular season (against all teams, not just tied teams).
2. Most total wins across the entire regular season (against all teams, not just tied teams).
3. Most goals scored across the entire regular season (against all teams, not just tied teams).
4. Head-to-head results (total points) between the tied teams.
5. Head-to-head most goals scored between the tied teams.
6. Least disciplinary points accumulated across the entire regular season (against all teams, not just tied teams).
7. Coin flip (if two teams are tied) or drawing of lots (if three or more teams are tied).

All tiebreakers involving goal counts (goal differential, goals for) include all regular-season games, not just games against tied teams.

Prior to the 2022 season, the first tie-breaker was head-to-head record.

== Winners ==
Season	Winner	Record				Points / Pts per game	Playoff result	Win #
Season	Winner	Games	Won	Lost	Tied	Points / Pts per game	Playoff result	Win #
2013	Western New York Flash	22	10	4	8	38 / 1.73	Lost championship (to Portland Thorns FC)	1
2014	Seattle Reign FC	24	16	2	6	54 / 2.25	Lost championship (to FC Kansas City)	1
2015	Seattle Reign FC	20	13	3	4	43 / 2.15	Lost championship (to FC Kansas City)	2
2016	Portland Thorns FC	20	12	3	5	41 / 2.05	Lost semifinal (to Western New York Flash)	1
2017	North Carolina Courage	24	16	7	1	49 / 2.04	Lost championship (to Portland Thorns FC)	1
2018	North Carolina Courage	24	17	1	6	57 / 2.38	Won championship (vs Portland Thorns FC)	2
2019	North Carolina Courage	24	15	5	4	49 / 2.09	Won championship (vs Chicago Red Stars)	3
2020	Regular season canceled due to COVID-19; Fall Series won by Portland Thorns FC							
2021	Portland Thorns FC	24	13	6	5	44 / 1.83	Lost semifinal (to Chicago Red Stars)	2
2022	OL Reign	22	11	4	7	40 / 1.82	Lost semifinal (to Kansas City Current)	3
2023	San Diego Wave FC	22	11	7	4	37 / 1.68	Lost semifinal (to OL Reign)	1
2024	Orlando Pride	26	18	2	6	60 / 2.31	Won championship (vs Washington Spirit)	1
2025	Kansas City Current	26	21	3	2	65 / 2.50	Lost Quarterfinal (vs Gotham FC)	1
2026	Gotham FC	30	18	5	7	61 / 2.04		1

team also won the NWSL Championship

== Records ==
=== Shield winners ===
Italics indicates a defunct team.

Team	Wins	Years won
North Carolina Courage	3	2017, 2018, 2019
Seattle Reign FC	3	2014, 2015, 2022
Portland Thorns FC	2	2016, 2021
Gotham FC	1	2026
Kansas City Current	1	2025
Orlando Pride	1	2024
San Diego Wave FC	1	2023
Western New York Flash	1	2013

== See also ==
- List of sports awards honoring women
- NWSL awards
- NWSL playoffs
- NWSL records and statistics
- List of American and Canadian soccer champions
