= 2016 Washington Spirit season =

Washington Spirit
2016 season
- General manager: Chris Hummer
- Head coach: Jim Gabarra
- Stadium: Maryland SoccerPlex
- NWSL: 2nd (finals loss)
- Top goalscorer: League: Estefania Banini (5); All: Estefania Banini (5)
- Highest home attendance: 5,750 (June 18 vs. Orlando Pride)
- Lowest home attendance: 2,930 (July 31 vs. Sky Blue FC)
- Average home league attendance: 3,782
Home colors	Away colors

The 2016 season was Washington Spirit's fourth season, competing in the National Women's Soccer League, the top division of women's soccer in the United States.

== Review ==
Building off the successes of the previous two playoff appearances the Spirit hired former Sky Blue FC manager, Jim Gabarra to replace Mark Parsons.

The Spirit would see their most successful season to date in 2016, being league leaders in the standings throughout most of the season. Only in the final week would the Spirit's loss at Chicago Red Stars finalize them as league runners-up.

Returning to the playoffs, the Spirit earned their first post-season victory in a revenge effort against Chicago Red Stars, who just a week earlier denied them the league title. The match was sent into extra time where Francisca Ordega scored the game-winner in the 111th minute. Advancing to the final for the first time in club history, the Spirit faced Western New York Flash in Houston, Texas.

The 2016 NWSL Final played to a 1–1 draw in regulation, and finished 2–2 at the end of extra time; both Spirit goals scored by Crystal Dunn. Going into penalties, Western New won 3–2 with only Christine Nairn and Katie Stengel slotting their penalties.

=== National Anthem Protest ===
The week prior to a match with the Spirit, Seattle Reign FC and U.S. women's national soccer team player Megan Rapinoe knelt during the national anthem in a game on September 5, 2016, explaining that her decision was a "nod to Kaepernick and everything that he's standing for right now". Anticipating Rapinoe's protest, Spirit owner Bill Lynch, moved the national anthem's performance ahead of the Spirit-Reign match without warning or notice to occur before the players' appearances on the pitch. Jeff Plush, the league's commissioner, was present at the game and told reporters that he was unaware of Lynch's plans and disagreed with the act of moving the anthem's performance. The Spirit's players issued a joint statement also disagreeing with Lynch's decision to move the anthem without first consulting the team's players or coaches.

== Club ==
=== Roster ===
The first-team roster of Washington Spirit.

Note: Flags indicate national team as defined under FIFA eligibility rules; some limited exceptions apply. Players may hold more than one non-FIFA nationality.

No.	Pos.	Nation	Player
1	GK	CAN	Stephanie Labbé (FP)
3	DF	USA	Caprice Dydasco
4	DF	USA	Megan Oyster
5	DF	USA	Whitney Church
6	DF	CAN	Shelina Zadorsky (FP)
7	MF	USA	Christine Nairn
8	MF	CAN	Diana Matheson (FP)
10	MF	ARG	Estefania Banini
11	DF	USA	Ali Krieger (captain) (FP)
12	FW	USA	Katie Stengel

No.	Pos.	Nation	Player
14	FW	NGR	Francisca Ordega
15	MF	USA	Joanna Lohman
17	FW	USA	Cali Farquharson
18	GK	USA	Kelsey Wys
19	FW	USA	Crystal Dunn (FP)
20	FW	USA	Cheyna Williams
22	DF	USA	Alyssa Kleiner
23	MF	USA	Tori Huster
24	DF	CMR	Estelle Johnson
57	FW	ESP	Laura del Rio

- (FP) = Federation player

=== Team management ===
Owner	Bill Lynch
General Manager	Jim Gabarra
Head Coach	Jim Gabarra

== Competitions ==
=== Preseason ===
On January 26, the Washington Spirit announced its preseason schedule.

March 19, Sat	Washington Spirit	3–0	University of Virginia	Boyds, Maryland
19:00 EDT (UTC-04)	Banini 3', 15'; Stengel 38'			Stadium: Maryland Soccerplex
Note: Played in three 30-minute periods.

March 26, Sat	Washington Spirit	2–0	Pennsylvania State University	Boyds, Maryland
16:00 EDT (UTC-04)	Dunn 47'; Nairn 73'			Stadium: Maryland Soccerplex; Attendance: 3,000

=== Regular season ===
Sat Apr 16 1	Washington Spirit	1–0	Boston Breakers	Boyds, Maryland
7:00 p.m.	Lohman 3'; Oyster (yellow card) 86'			Stadium: Maryland SoccerPlex; Attendance: 3,578; Referee: Margaret Domka

Sun Apr 24 2	Sky Blue FC	1–2	Washington Spirit	Piscataway, New Jersey
	Hayes 66' (Lytle); O'Hara (yellow card) 74'		Krieger 40' (Huster); Zadorsky (yellow card) 46+'; Matheson 56' (Dunn)	Stadium: Yurcak Field; Attendance: 2,571; Referee: Matthew Kreitzer

Fri Apr 29 3	Western New York Flash	0–3	Washington Spirit	Rochester, New York
	Eddy (yellow card) 80'		Matheson 4' (Dunn), 72' (pen.); Eddy 82' (o.g.)	Stadium: Sahlen's Stadium; Attendance: 3,615; Referee: Matthew Franz

Sat May 7 4	Washington Spirit	0–0	Portland Thorns FC	Boyds, Maryland
	Oyster (yellow card) 17'		Sonnett (yellow card) 28'; Heath (yellow card) 59' (yellow-red card) 88'; Horan (yellow card) 95+'	Stadium: Maryland SoccerPlex; Attendance: 3,615; Referee: Matthew Franz

Sat May 14 5	Washington Spirit	1–0	Houston Dash	Boyds, Maryland
	Lohman 39' (Nairn); Kleiner (yellow card) 66'; Krieger (yellow card) 89'	Report		Stadium: Maryland SoccerPlex; Attendance: 3,545; Referee: Elvis Mahmutovic

Sat May 21 6	Portland Thorns FC	4–1	Washington Spirit	Portland, Oregon, U.S.
	Horan 27' (Heath) (yellow card) 76'; Own goal 31' (Kleiner); Heath 45' (Sinclair); Morris 78' (unassisted) (yellow card) 60'; Sonnett (yellow card) 32' Nadim (yellow card) 61'		Lohman 55' (Dunn); Nairn (yellow card) 61'	Stadium: Providence Park; Attendance: 15,823; Referee: Ekaterina Koroleva

Fri May 27	Houston Dash	PPD	Washington Spirit	Houston, Texas
				Stadium: BBVA Compass Stadium

Fri Jun 10 7	Boston Breakers	1–1	Washington Spirit	Boston, Massachusetts
	Louise Schillgard 15' (pen.)		Katie Stengel 13'	Stadium: Jordan Field; Attendance: 4,007; Referee: Margaret Domka

Sat Jun 18 8	Washington Spirit	2–0	Orlando Pride	Germantown, Maryland
	Estefania Banini 9' (Alyssa Kleiner); Francisca Ordega 40' (unassisted)			Stadium: Maryland SoccerPlex; Attendance: 5,750; Referee: Christopher Spivey

Sat Jun 25 9	Washington Spirit	1–2	Sky Blue FC	Boyds, Maryland
	Diana Matheson 77' (Estefania Banini)		Raquel Rodriguez 8' (Leah Galton); Samantha Kerr 64' (Leah Galton)	Stadium: Maryland SoccerPlex; Attendance: 3,448; Referee: Leszek Stalmach

Sat Jul 2 10	Washington Spirit	2–0	FC Kansas City	Boyds, Maryland
	Francisca Ordega 79'; Tori Huster 85'			Stadium: Maryland SoccerPlex; Attendance: 3,036; Referee: Karen Abt

Sat Jul 9 11	Washington Spirit	2–0	Chicago Red Stars	Boyds, Maryland
	Estefania Banini 24' (Francisca Ordega); Francisca Ordega (yellow card) 47'; Katie Stengel 74' (Christine Nairn)		Alyssa Mautz (yellow card) 42'	Stadium: Maryland SoccerPlex; Attendance: 3,631; Referee: Brandon Artis

Sat Jul 16 12	FC Kansas City	2–3	Washington Spirit	Boyds, Maryland
	Frances Silva 69' (Erika Tymrak); Shea Groom 91+'		Estefania Banini 48+' (unassisted), 83' (unassisted); Joanna Lohman 58' (unassisted)	Stadium: Swope Soccer Village; Attendance: 2,013; Referee: Elvis Mahmutovic

Sat Jul 23 13	Sky Blue FC	1–0	Washington Spirit	Piscataway, New Jersey
	Leah Galton 24' (Erin Simon)			Stadium: Yurcak Field; Attendance: 1,552; Referee: Matthew Kreitzer

Sat Jul 30 14	Washington Spirit	3–1	Sky Blue FC	Boyds, Maryland
	Estefania Banini 27' (Joanna Lohman); Cheyna Williams 39' (Caprice Dydasco); Alyssa Kleiner 95+' (unassisted)		Tasha Kai 33' (unassisted)	Stadium: Maryland SoccerPlex; Attendance: 2,930; Referee: Victor Rivas

Thu Aug 18 15	Houston Dash	1–2	Washington Spirit	Houston
	Christine Nairn 30' (pen.), 63' (unassisted)		Kealia Ohai 90' (Stephanie Ochs)	Stadium: BBVA Compass Stadium; Attendance: 5,012; Referee: Christina Unkel
Note: rescheduled from May 27

Fri Aug 26 16	Orlando Pride	1–2	Washington Spirit	Orlando, Florida
	Toni Pressley (yellow card) 28'; Sarah Hagen 71' (Cami Levin)		Ali Krieger (yellow card) 35'; Cheyna Williams 37' (Caprice Dydasco); Christine Nairn 57' (Katie Stengel)	Stadium: Camping World Stadium; Attendance: 7,052; Referee: Marco Vega

Sat Sep 3 17	Washington Spirit	1–1	Western New York Flash	Boyds, Maryland
	Katie Stengel 64' (Crystal Dunn); Diana Matheson (yellow card) 85'		Elizabeth Eddy (yellow card) 40'; Samantha Mewis 86' (unassisted)	Stadium: Maryland SoccerPlex; Attendance: 4,527; Referee: Chris Spivey

Wed Sep 7 18	Washington Spirit	2–1	Seattle Reign FC	Boyds, Maryland
5:00 p.m. EDT	Crystal Dunn 50+'; Cheyna Williams 62'		Kim Little 70' (penalty); Kendall Fletcher (yellow card) 74'	Stadium: Maryland SoccerPlex; Attendance: 3,039; Referee: Guido Gonzalez Jr.

Sun Sep 11 19	Seattle Reign FC	2–0	Washington Spirit	Seattle, Washington
	Yanez 27'; Winters 78'			Stadium: Memorial Stadium; Attendance: 4,711; Referee: Greg Dopka

Sat Sep 24 20	Chicago Red Stars	3–1	Washington Spirit	Bridgeview, Illinois
	Christen Press 6' (Vanessa DiBernardo); Cara Walls 26' (Sofia Herta); Sofia Huerta 46' (unassisted)		Crystal Dunn 47' (unassisted)	Stadium: Toyota Park; Attendance: 3,712; Referee: Matthew Franz

==== Regular-season standings ====
Pos	Team	Pld	W	D	L	GF	GA	GD	Pts	Qualification
1	Portland Thorns FC	20	12	5	3	35	19	+16	41	NWSL Shield
2	Washington Spirit	20	12	3	5	30	21	+9	39	NWSL Playoffs
3	Chicago Red Stars	20	9	6	5	24	20	+4	33	NWSL Playoffs
4	Western New York Flash (C)	20	9	5	6	40	26	+14	32	NWSL Playoffs
5	Seattle Reign FC	20	8	6	6	29	21	+8	30	
6	FC Kansas City	20	7	5	8	18	20	−2	26	
7	Sky Blue FC	20	7	5	8	24	30	−6	26	
8	Houston Dash	20	6	4	10	29	29	0	22	
9	Orlando Pride	20	6	1	13	20	30	−10	19	
10	Boston Breakers	20	3	2	15	14	47	−33	11	

Source: NWSL
Rules for classification: Tiebreakers
(C) Champions

==== Results summary ====
Overall								Home						Away					
Pld	W	D	L	GF	GA	GD	Pts	W	D	L	GF	GA	GD	W	D	L	GF	GA	GD
20	12	3	5	30	21	+9	39	7	2	1	15	5	+10	5	1	4	15	16	−1

Last updated: September 11, 2016.
Source: Match reports

Round	1	2	3	4	5	6	7	8	9	10	11	12	13	14	15	16	17	18	19	20
Stadium	H	A	A	H	H	A	A	H	H	H	H	A	A	H	A	A	H	H	A	A
Result	W	W	W	D	W	L	D	W	L	W	W	W	L	W	W	W	W	W	L	L
Position (Note: Washington Spirit's position in the league at the end of match day)	3	2	1	1	1	1	1	2	3	3	3	2	2	2	1	1	1	1	1	2

Updated to match(es) played on September 24, 2016. Source: Match reports
A = Away; H = Home; W = Win; D = Draw; L = Loss

=== NWSL Playoffs ===
Fri Sept 30 7:00 pm CDT NWSL Playoffs Semifinal	Washington Spirit	2–1 (a.e.t.)	Chicago Red Stars	Boyds, Maryland
19:00 UTC-05	Krieger 36' (Zadorsky); Nairn (yellow card) 57'; Ordega 111' (Christine Nairn)		Press 74' (Short); Johnson (yellow card) 120+2'	Stadium: Maryland SoccerPlex; Attendance: 4,249; Referee: Danielle Chesky

Sun Oct 9 4:00 pm CDT 2016 NWSL Championship	Western New York Flash	2–2 (a.e.t.) (3–2 p)	Washington Spirit	Houston, Texas
16:00 UTC-05	Mewis 14' (Williams); Zerboni (yellow card) 84'; Williams 124+' (McDonald)	Report	Dunn 9' (Oyster) 91' (Krieger); Wys (yellow card) 122+'	Stadium: BBVA Compass Stadium; Attendance: 8,255; Referee: Christina Unkel
	Penalties
	Dahlkemper (penalty scored); Hinkle (penalty scored); McDonald (penalty missed); Williams (penalty scored); Mewis (penalty missed)		(penalty missed) Krieger; (penalty scored) Nairn; (penalty scored) Stengel; (penalty missed) Huster; (penalty missed) Matheson

== Squad statistics ==
Source: NWSL

Squad statistics are of regular season only

N	Pos	Player	GP	GS	Min	G	A	PK	Shot	SOG	SOG%	Cro	CK	Off	Foul	FS	YC	RC
10	F	Estefania Banini	13	9	888	5	1	0	23	12	52%	3	0	1	1	17	0	0
5	DF	Whitney Church	11	7	610	0	0	0	0	0	—	1	0	0	3	2	0	0
19	DF	Crystal Dunn	13	12	1142	2	5	0	37	14	38%	2	0	13	8	26	0	0
3	DF	Caprice Dydasco	12	12	1080	0	2	0	7	3	43%	4	0	1	8	6	1	0
17	DF	Cali Farquharson	16	8	561	0	0	0	10	2	20%	0	0	4	5	3	0	0
23	DF	Tori Huster	19	19	1665	1	1	0	13	4	31%	0	0	0	14	15	0	0
27	DF	Line Jensen	3	2	141	0	0	0	0	0	—	0	0	0	0	0	0	0
24	DF	Estelle Johnson	11	11	990	0	0	0	7	4	57%	0	0	0	3	1	0	0
22	DF	Alyssa Kleiner	17	12	1115	1	1	0	5	2	40%	2	0	1	10	8	1	0
11	DF	Ali Krieger	15	14	1267	1	0	0	6	2	33%	3	6	1	5	5	2	0
1	GK	Stephanie Labbe	8	8	720	0	0	0	0	0	—	0	0	0	0	0	0	0
15	MF	Joanna Lohman	20	17	1535	4	1	0	30	14	47%	1	0	1	27	15	1	0
8	MF	Diana Matheson	12	9	800	4	0	1	12	8	67%	0	25	2	3	9	1	0
7	MF	Christine Nairn	20	18	1619	3	3	1	37	13	35%	9	85	2	7	21	1	0
14	FW	Francisca Ordega	13	7	629	2	1	0	18	12	67%	0	0	8	10	13	1	0
4	DF	Megan Oyster	15	15	1340	0	0	0	3	0	0%	0	0	0	12	6	2	0
2	FW	Katie Stengel	19	10	928	4	1	0	20	10	50%	1	0	5	5	4	0	0
20	FW	Cheyna Williams	17	8	779	3	0	0	20	9	45%	0	0	9	10	9	1	0
18	GK	Kelsey Wys	12	12	1080	0	0	0	0	0	—	0	0	0	0	1	0	0
6	DF	Shelina Zadorsky	11	10	911	0	0	0	1	0	0%	1	0	0	8	4	2	0
Team total			20	—	19800	30	16	2	249	109	44%	27	116	48	139	165	13	0

N	Pos	Goal keeper	GP	GS	Min	GA	GA/G	PKA	PKF	Shot	SOG	Sav	Sav%	YC	RC
1	GK	Stephanie Labbe	8	8	720	7	0.88	0	1	71	30	24	80%	0	0
18	GK	Kelsey Wys	12	12	1080	14	1.17	2	2	163	75	61	81%	0	0
Team total			20	—	1800	21	1.05	2	3	234	105	85	81%	0	0

== Transfers ==
=== In ===
No.	Pos.	Player	Transferred from	Fee/notes	Date	Source
12	FW	(United States) Katie Stengel	(Germany) FC Bayern Munich	Signed	December 30, 2015	
20	FW	(United States) Cheyna Williams	(United States) Florida State	2016 NWSL College Draft - 1st Round	January 19, 2016	
17	FW	(United States) Cali Farquharson	(United States) Arizona State	2016 NWSL College Draft - 2nd Round	January 19, 2016	
1	GK	(Canada) Stephanie Labbé	(Sweden) KIF Örebro	NWSL Player Allocation and trade for DaCosta	February 2, 2016	
6	DF	(Canada) Shelina Zadorsky	(Sweden) Vittsjö GIK	NWSL Player Allocation	February 2, 2016	
22	DF	(United States) Alyssa Kleiner	(United States) Portland Thorns FC	Trade for Reynolds	February 2, 2016	
14	DF	(Denmark) Line Jensen	(Denmark) Fortuna Hjørring	Signed	July 13, 2016	

=== Out ===
No.	Pos.	Player	Transferred to	Fee/notes	Date	Source
17	MF	(Mexico) Verónica Pérez	(Australia) Canberra United		September 17, 2016	
12	DF	(Nigeria) Josephine Chukwunonye	(Sweden) Vittsjö GIK	Waived	December 22, 2015	
25	FW	(Nigeria) Ngozi Okobi	(Sweden) Vittsjö GIK	Waived	January 6, 2016	
2	DF	(United States) Katherine Reynolds	(United States) Portland Thorns FC	Trade for Kleiner	February 2, 2016	
16	FW	(United States) Tiffany Weimer	(United States) FC Kansas City	Waived	March 31, 2016	
22	DF	(Mexico) Arianna Romero	(United States) Seattle Reign	NWSL Distribution Draft	March 31, 2016	
20	FW	(Australia) Hayley Raso	(United States) Portland Thorns FC	Waived	April 11, 2016	
22	MF	(United States) Amanda DaCosta	(United States) Chicago Red Stars	Trade for draft pick and Labbé	April 16, 2016	
28	DF	(United States) Jennifer Skogerboe	(Czech Republic) FC Slovácko			

== Honors and awards ==
=== NWSL Yearly Awards ===
==== NWSL Team of the Year ====
Team	Position	Player	Ref.
Second XI	Defender	(United States) Ali Krieger	
Second X1	Forward	(United States) Crystal Dunn	

==== NWSL Player of the Month ====
Month	Player	Month's Statline	Ref.
July	(Argentina) Estefanía Banini	4 goals; Spirit 4-1-0 in July	

=== NWSL Weekly Awards ===
==== NWSL Player of the Week ====
Week	Result	Player	Ref.
13	Won	(Argentina) Estefanía Banini	

==== NWSL Goal of the Week ====
Week	Result	Player	Ref.
2	Won	(United States) Ali Krieger	
13	Won	(Argentina) Estefanía Banini	
16	Won	(United States) Christine Nairn	

== See also ==
- 2016 National Women's Soccer League season
