= Ali Krieger =

American soccer player (born 1984)

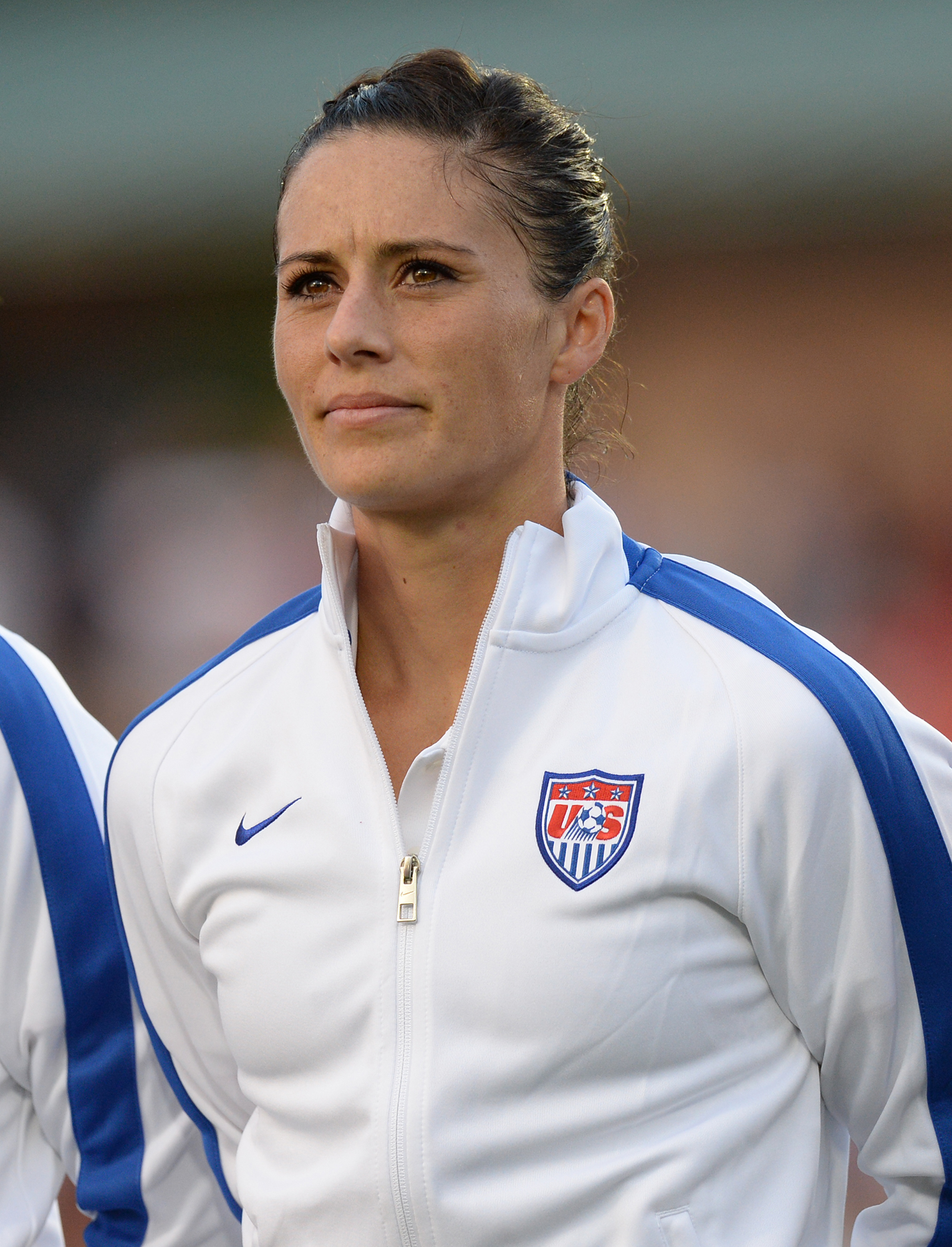
- Krieger with the United States national team in 2014

Personal information
- Full name: Alexandra Blaire Krieger
- Date of birth: July 28, 1984 (age 42)
- Place of birth: Dumfries, Virginia, U.S.
- Height: 5 ft 6 in (1.68 m)
- Positions: Right back; center back

Youth career
- 1991–2003: Prince William Sparklers

College career
Years	Team	Apps	(Gls)
2003–2006	Penn State Nittany Lions	94	(11)

Senior career*
Years	Team	Apps	(Gls)
2005	Northern Virginia Majestics	1	(0)
2006–2007	Washington Freedom	7	(0)
2007–2012	1. FFC Frankfurt	69	(2)
2009	→ Washington Freedom (loan)	10	(0)
2013–2016	Washington Spirit	62	(3)
2013	→ Tyresö FF (loan)	7	(0)
2017–2021	Orlando Pride	83	(0)
2022–2023	NJ/NY Gotham FC	36	(0)

International career^{‡}
2006–2007	United States U23	4	(0)
2008–2021	United States	108	(1)
Medal record
Representing United States
FIFA Women's World Cup
Winner	2019 France
Winner	2015 Canada
Runner-up	2011 Germany
- * Club domestic league appearances and goals as of October 21, 2023 ‡ National team caps and goals as of January 22, 2021

Alexandra Blaire Krieger (born July 28, 1984) is an American former professional soccer player who played as a right back or center back. She made more than 100 appearances for the United States from 2008 to 2021, with which she won two FIFA Women's World Cups.

Krieger played collegiately for the Penn State Nittany Lions, where she was named a first-team All-American as both a midfielder and defender. After college, she joined Frauen-Bundesliga club 1. FFC Frankfurt, helping win the league title, national cup, and UEFA Women's Cup in her first season in 2007–08; during her five years in Germany, she was the only member of the United States national team that played overseas. She left for the Washington Spirit of the new National Women's Soccer League (NWSL) in 2013. She later played for the Orlando Pride and NJ/NY Gotham FC, which she captained to an NWSL Championship in her final season in 2023. She was named to the NWSL Best XI four times.

Krieger made her senior international debut for the United States in 2008. She represented the team at three FIFA Women's World Cups: 2011 in Germany, where she played every minute of the tournament and reached the final; 2015 in Canada, where she started every match as part of the defense that held opponents scoreless for a record 540 minutes and helped lead the United States to become champions; and 2019 in France, where she made three appearances as the United States defended their title. In 2012, she sustained a serious knee injury at the CONCACAF Women's Olympic Qualifying Tournament and did not recover in time to be selected for the 2012 Olympic team; she was named to her only Olympic team at the 2016 Olympics, becoming the oldest first-time Olympian for United States women's soccer.

== Early life ==
I just wanted to do whatever he did. I wanted to hang out with him all the time and just be hardcore. We were best friends.

— Krieger on her brother, Kyle

Born to Debbie Alongi and Ken Krieger in the Washington, D.C. suburb of Alexandria, Virginia, Ali was raised with one older brother, Kyle in Dumfries, Virginia. Her father played professional soccer and was a soccer coach in Virginia. Her brother, Kyle, was the reason she started playing soccer. Krieger played youth soccer for the Prince William Sparklers, where she was coached by her father for 12 years. She played with the team from age seven to 19 and was one of the eight players that stayed with the Sparklers for the entire twelve-year run.

In high school, Krieger spent one year at Hylton High School before transferring to newly opened Forest Park High School in Woodbridge, Virginia. At Forest Park, she was a three-year team captain, led her team to their first undefeated regular season and was a three-time, first-team all-district player. She was twice named an All-Virginia AAA selection and was an All-Met Honorable mention during her sophomore year. During her junior and senior years, she was a first-team All-Met selection and as a senior was named The Washington Post's Player of the Year, Krieger was also honored as Gatorade's Virginia Player of the Year in her final year at Forest Park.

=== Penn State Nittany Lions, 2003–06 ===
Krieger attended Penn State University from 2003 to 2006 where she played for the Nittany Lions women's soccer team. She was an advertising and public relations major.

In 2003, Krieger started in all 25 matches for Penn State, ten of those appearances being in conference matches. She ranked fifth in number of shots in the season at Penn State with 24 and third in assists with nine. Penn State was the 2003 Big Ten Conference regular season champion and was No.1 seed in the Big Ten Women's Soccer Tournament. Krieger started in the quarterfinals of the tournament, where they faced Wisconsin on November 6. Wisconsin advanced in the tournament on penalty kicks after the scored was tied 0–0. Penn State earned the No. 5 seed in the NCAA Tournament, its highest seed up to that point. They made it to the quarterfinal round, when they were defeated by UCLA on November 28, 2003. At the end of the 2003 season, Krieger was named Big Ten Freshman of the Year. Krieger broke the big ten record for numbers assist in one game with four against Bucknell on September 17, 2003.

In 2004, Krieger started in all 23 matches for Penn State, ten of those appearances being in conference matches. She ranked fourth in points for the season with nine, fifth in goals with three, sixth in assists with three, fourth in shots with 35, and third in shots on goal with 16. Penn State was the 2004 Big Ten Conference regular season champion and was No.1 seed in the Big Ten Women's Soccer Tournament. Krieger started in all three matches of the tournament for Penn State. Penn State faced Ohio State on November 7 in the final of the tournament, which ended in a 0–2 defeat for Penn State. Penn State earned the No. 2 seed in the NCAA Tournament, its highest up to that point. They made it to the second round, where they were defeated by Maryland on November 14. At the end of the 2004 season, Krieger was given NSCAA All-Mid-Atlantic Region First Team honors, All-Big Ten First Team honors, and Academic All-Big Ten honors.

In her junior year, Krieger made 20 appearances for Penn State, ten of those appearances being in conference matches. She made seven goals in the season, which tied for second in the season at Penn State. Three of those goals were game-winning goals. Penn State was the 2004 Big Ten Conference regular season champion and was No.1 seed in the Big Ten Women's Soccer Tournament. They made it to the quarterfinals of the tournament, when they were defeated by Michigan on November 3. Penn State earned the No. 1 seed in the NCAA Tournament, its highest seed ever. However, two days before the tournament, Krieger broke her leg while playing against a men's soccer team in preparation for the tournament. The injury required surgery, where they inserted a plate and five screws in her leg. A few months later in January, after traveling to visit her family, Krieger began experiencing shortness of breath and checked into the hospital as a precaution. As a result of her broken leg and subsequent plane rides, she had developed blood clots in her legs that traveled up to her lungs and caused a pulmonary embolism, affecting her blood flow and triggering six mini-heart attacks. The doctor informed her that if she had gone to sleep that night, there was a high probability that she would not have woken up. She was required to do a series of self-injections of enoxaparin for several months, but eventually made a full recovery and joined the Nittany Lions for her senior season. At the end of her shortened 2005 season, Krieger was given NSCAA All-America First Team honors, NSCAA All-Mid-Atlantic Region First Team honors, All-Big Ten First Team honors, and Academic All-Big Ten honors.

During her senior season, Krieger was named captain of the team and switched from the midfield position to defense. She played in all 19 games for Penn State, eight of those being in conference matches. She made one goal and two assists during the season. Penn State was the 2006 Big Ten Conference regular season champion and the No. 1 seed in the Big Ten Women's Soccer Tournament. Krieger appeared in all of the team's matches in the tournament, including the final against Illinois on November 5, helping Penn State win the tournament. Penn State earned a No.2 seed at the NCAA Tournament and made it to the quarterfinals, when they were defeated by Notre Dame on November 24. At the end of the 2006 season, Krieger was named Big Ten Defensive Player of the Year and Penn State's Most Valuable Player. She also received NSCAA All-Mid-Atlantic Region First Team honors, NSCAA All-America First Team honors, All-Big Ten First Team honors, Big Ten All-Tournament Team honors, and Academic All-Big Ten honors. After being named to the NSCAA All-America First Team in both 2005 and 2006, Krieger became the only Nittany Lion to be given All-American honors at two different positions.

==== Penn State summary ====
Year	GP/GS	SH	G	A	Pts.	GW
2003	25/25	24	0	9	9	0
2004	23/23	35	3	3	9	1
2005	20/20	46	7	2	16	3
2006	26/26	24	2	5	9	1
Total	94/94	129	12	19	43	5

Updated through July 28, 2016

== Club career ==
=== Washington Freedom, 2004 ===
Following her freshman year at Penn State, Krieger joined the Washington Freedom for exhibition matches in the summer of 2004.

=== Northern Virginia Majestics, 2005 ===
Krieger played as a midfielder with the Northern Virginia Majestics in the W-League during the summer of 2005. The W-League was often used by college players as a summer playing option because of its status as an open league, allowing college players to maintain eligibility. Krieger made one appearance for the team, playing 110 minutes.

=== Washington Freedom, 2005 & 2007 ===
Following her short time with the Northern Virginia Majestics in the summer of 2005, Krieger returned to the Washington Freedom in July 2005 for more exhibition matches with the team. In November 2005, Krieger sustained a broken leg while with her collegiate team and eventually developed a pulmonary embolism, which kept her off the pitch that summer. In order to recover and refrain from further traveling, Krieger remained at Penn State and did not join the Washington Freedom for their 2006 season. Krieger joined the Freedom during the summer of 2007 for their first season as a full W-League team.

=== 1. FFC Frankfurt, 2007–08 ===
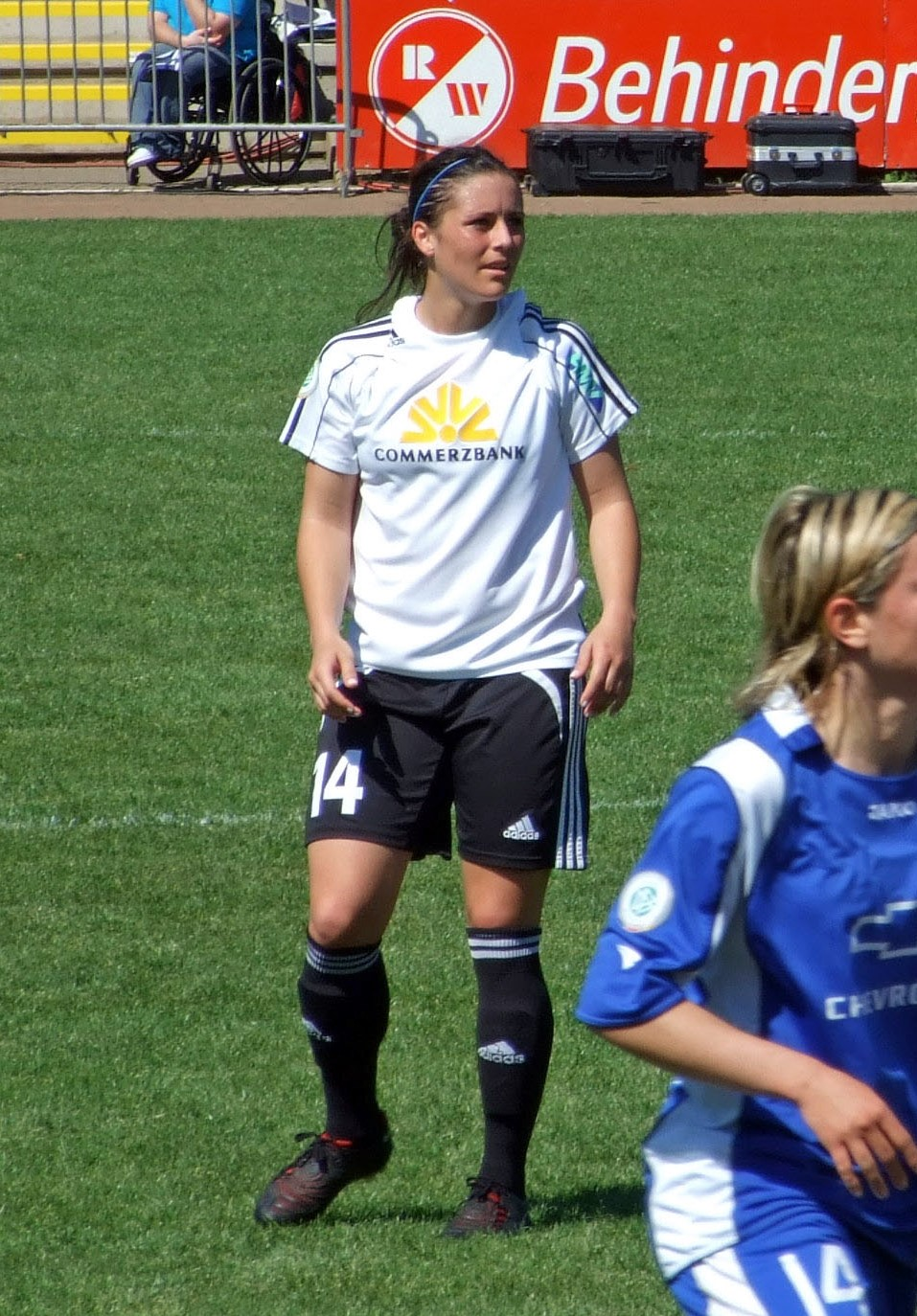
Krieger with FFC Frankfurt in 2008

In August 2007, immediately following the W-League season, Krieger signed a two-year contract with 1. FFC Frankfurt in the Frauen-Bundesliga, the highest division of women's soccer in Germany. Her first season with the team was the 2007–08 season, which ran from August 19, 2007, to June 15, 2008. During the season, Krieger helped FFC Frankfurt become Bundesliga Champions, Frauen DFB–Pokal Champions, and UEFA Cup Champions. Krieger and teammate Gina Lewandowski became the first Americans to win the UEFA Women's Cup.

In September 2008, Krieger was one of the 21 United States national team players who was allocated to a team in the newly formed Women's Professional Soccer (WPS) league. However, due to her commitments with FFC Frankfurt, Krieger was unable to join the team at the time. Instead, she stayed in Germany for the 2008–09 Bundesliga season, which ran from August to June. Early on in the season, Krieger sustained an injury to her foot that limited her movement. At the end of the Bundesliga season in June 2009, Frankfurt allowed Krieger to join the Washington Freedom on loan for the 2009 season, where she could adequately recover and regain fitness for the following Bundesliga season.

=== Washington Freedom, 2009 ===
Krieger made her first appearance for the Washington Freedom in the 2009 WPS season on June 13 in a match against the Chicago Red Stars. She started the match and was replaced in the 72nd minute by Jill Gilbeau. Krieger made a total of 10 appearances in the regular season, starting nine. She recorded one assist. The Washington Freedom went on to place third in the WPS and advanced to the playoffs. In the first round of the playoffs on August 15, the Freedom faced Sky Blue FC. She started the match and played all 90 minutes. The Freedom were defeated 1–2 and were eliminated from the playoffs.

=== 1. FFC Frankfurt, 2009–12 ===
Following the WPS season, Krieger returned to Germany to play with FFC Frankfurt for the 2009–10 season, starting with a match on September 20, 2009, against VfL Wolfsburg. She made 15 appearances in the regular season to help FFC Frankfurt finish third in the Bundesliga. Due to their third-place finish, Frankfurt did not qualify for UEFA Champions League. Krieger also appeared during two matches of the Frauen DFB–Pokal on November 14 and December 19. In February 2010, Krieger's contract with Frankfurt was extended for an additional year until June 2011.

Krieger played with Frankfurt for the 2010–11 season, appearing in 14 matches in the regular season to help Frankfurt finish second in the Bundesliga. She also appeared in four of Frankfurt's matches in the Frauen DFB–Pokal, including the final against Turbine Potsdam on March 26, 2011. Frankfurt won the final 2–1 to take the title. In March 2011, Krieger decided to return to the United States in order to focus on training with the United States women's national team.

Following the 2011 FIFA Women's World Cup, Krieger returned to Germany for the 2011–12 Bundesliga season. Her first appearance for the team since the previous March was on August 21, 2011, against SGS Essen. She subsequently made 18 appearances for the team between August and December, three of those appearances being a part of the Frauen DFB–Pokal. In January 2012, Krieger sustained a serious knee injury while with the United States national team that kept her off the pitch for the rest of the season.

Following a six-month recovery, Krieger made her first appearance back with FFC Frankfurt on September 23, 2012, in a match against Bayer Leverkusen, a 4–2 win for Frankfurt. She appeared in seven matches for Frankfurt, one of those being in the Frauen DFB-Pokal. In December 2012, Krieger requested and was granted release from her contract in order to play in the newly formed National Women's Soccer League.

=== Washington Spirit, 2013 ===
On January 11, 2013, Krieger was allocated to the Washington Spirit during the 2013 NWSL Player Allocation for the inaugural season of the National Women's Soccer League along with goalkeeper Ashlyn Harris and midfielder Lori Lindsey. Krieger made her first appearance for the Spirit on April 14, 2013, in a match against the Boston Breakers that ended in a 1–1 draw. She made 18 appearances in the regular season, starting 16. In her 1,412 minutes with the Spirit, she scored one goal. The Washington Spirit finished the season in last place in the NWSL.

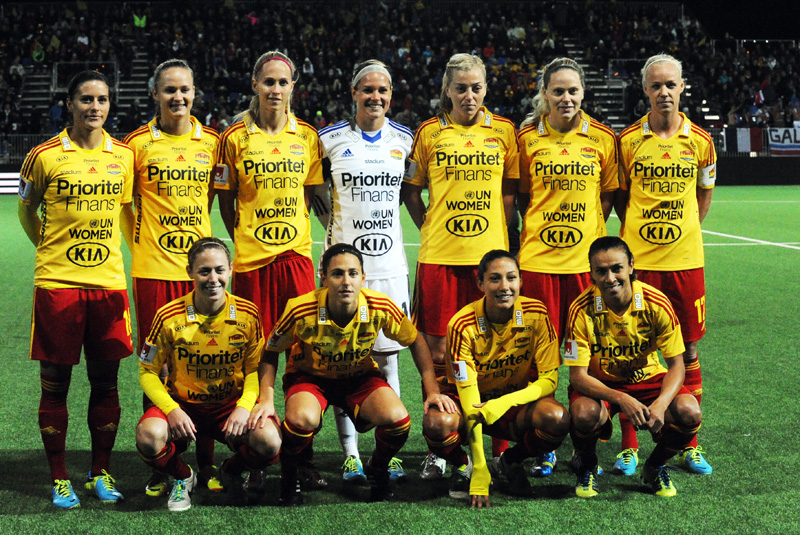
Krieger (top left) with Tyresö FF in 2013

=== Tyresö FF, 2013 ===
In August 2013, it was announced that immediately following the NWSL regular season, Krieger would be joining Tyresö FF in the Damallsvenskan, the highest division of women's soccer in Sweden. Krieger, Spirit teammate Ashlyn Harris, and United States women's national soccer team teammate Whitney Engen all signed short-term contracts with the team. They joined other United States national team members Christen Press and Meghan Klingenberg, who were already with the club on long-term contracts. Four days after the end of the NWSL season, Krieger played her first game for Tyresö on August 21, 2013. She made seven appearances with the team in the Damallsvenskan regular season and four appearances in the UEFA Women's Champions League.

In December, Tyresö announced that Engen, Press, and Klingenberg would be staying with Tyresö until the end of the Champions League. However, Krieger and Harris returned to the Washington Spirit for the start of the 2014 season.

=== Washington Spirit, 2014–2016 ===
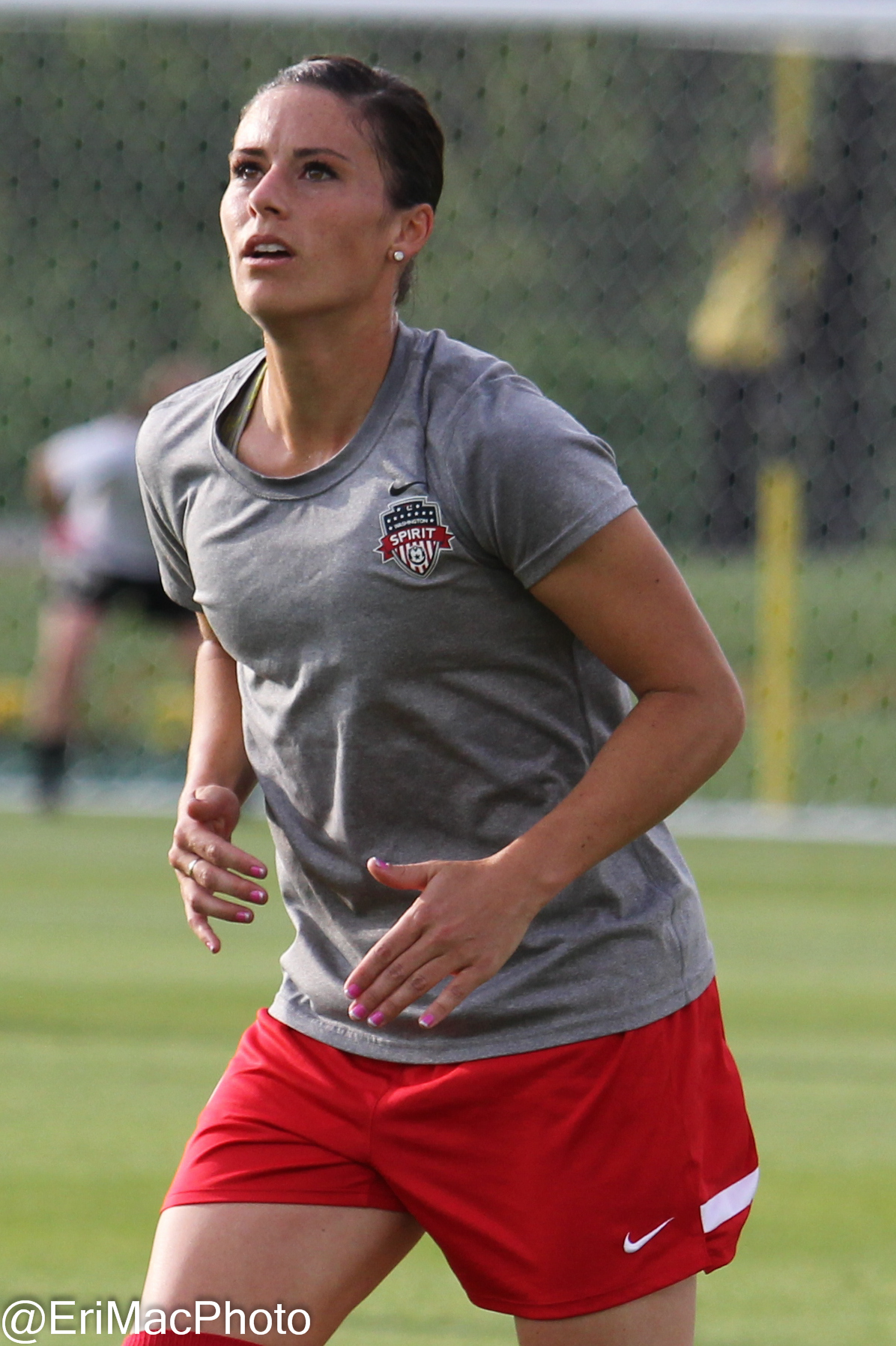

On January 3, 2014, Krieger was once again allocated to the Washington Spirit for the 2014 season. She made 22 appearances in the regular season, starting all 22. In the 1935 minutes she played for the Spirit, she made one goal and one assist, helping the Spirit finish fourth and advance to the playoffs. The Spirit faced Seattle Reign on August 24 in the semifinal. Krieger played all 90 minutes of the game, which ended in a 2–1 defeat for the Spirit. She came second in voting for NWSL Defender of the Year (tied with Julie Ertz) behind Becky Sauerbrunn in the 2014 season.

Krieger was once again with the Washington Spirit for the 2015 season. During the team's league opener on April 10, 2015, Krieger suffered a concussion in the 17th minute after making contact with the head of Jessica McDonald as they both jumped for a header. Krieger missed two matches with the Washington Spirit before she returned to training. However, she did not appear in another match for the Spirit until after the 2015 FIFA Women's World Cup, as she left to train with the United States women's national team soon after her recovery. She returned to the Spirit in late-July, appearing in a match against the Chicago Red Stars on July 25, which ended in a 1–1 draw. Krieger made eight appearances for the Spirit in the regular season, playing a total of 655 minutes. The Spirit ended the season in fourth place, clinching a spot in the playoffs. They faced Seattle Reign in the semifinals on September 13. Krieger was attending her father's wedding in Virginia the week of the playoffs and missed the match against Seattle Reign. The Spirit were defeated 3–0, eliminating them from the playoffs.

Krieger returned for her fourth season with the Spirit in 2016, playing 15 games, 14 starts, during the regular season and all 120 minutes of both postseason matches. She scored two goals, including the first goal in the semifinal which gave the Spirit the early lead in what would end up being the first semifinal win in the club's history. Krieger recorded an assist on one of Crystal Dunn's goals in the NWSL Championship. She was voted Spirit Fan Favorite and Spirit Defender of the Year and named to NWSL Second Best XI.

Krieger served as the captain of the Washington Spirit from 2014 to 2016.

=== Orlando Pride, 2016–2021 ===
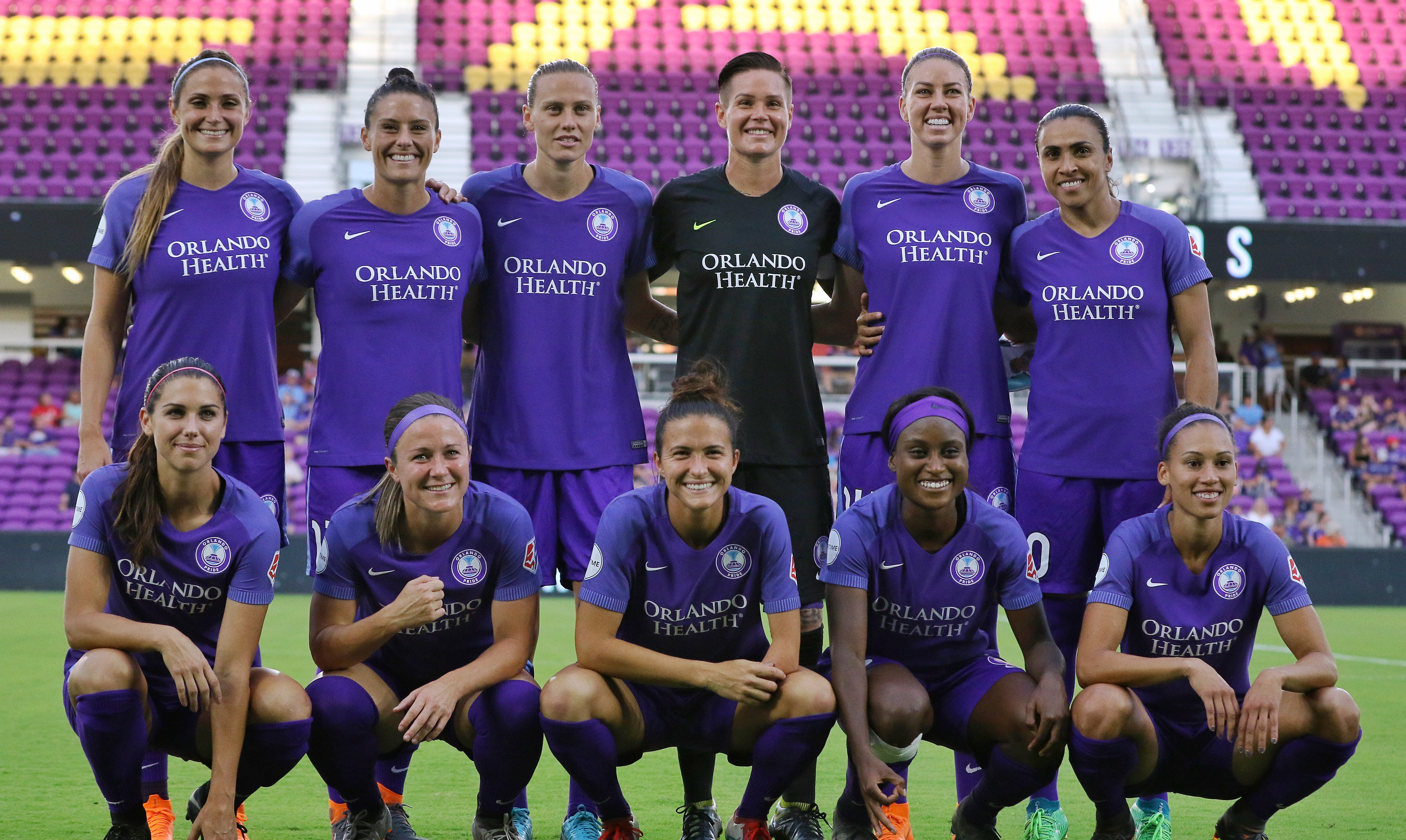
Krieger (top, second from left) with the Orlando Pride in 2018

On November 2, 2016, it was announced that Krieger had been traded to the Orlando Pride in exchange for the Pride's spot in the Allocation Ranking Order, which determines how elite players are allocated throughout the NWSL. She joined national team players Alex Morgan and Ashlyn Harris, who had also previously played with the Spirit until the 2015 expansion draft. Krieger stated the following day that she was surprised by the trade, but was ready to embrace new opportunities in Orlando.

In 2017 Krieger started every game for the Pride, helping Orlando finish 3rd in the standings and qualify for the playoffs for the first time. Krieger was named to the 2017 NWSL Best XI and was a finalist for NWSL Defender of the Year.

Prior to the 2018 NWSL season, Krieger signed a contract to remain with the Orlando Pride as she was no longer allocated by U.S Soccer. On July 14, Krieger played in her 100th career NWSL Game, a 2–1 win over the Utah Royals.

=== NJ/NY Gotham FC, 2022–2023 ===
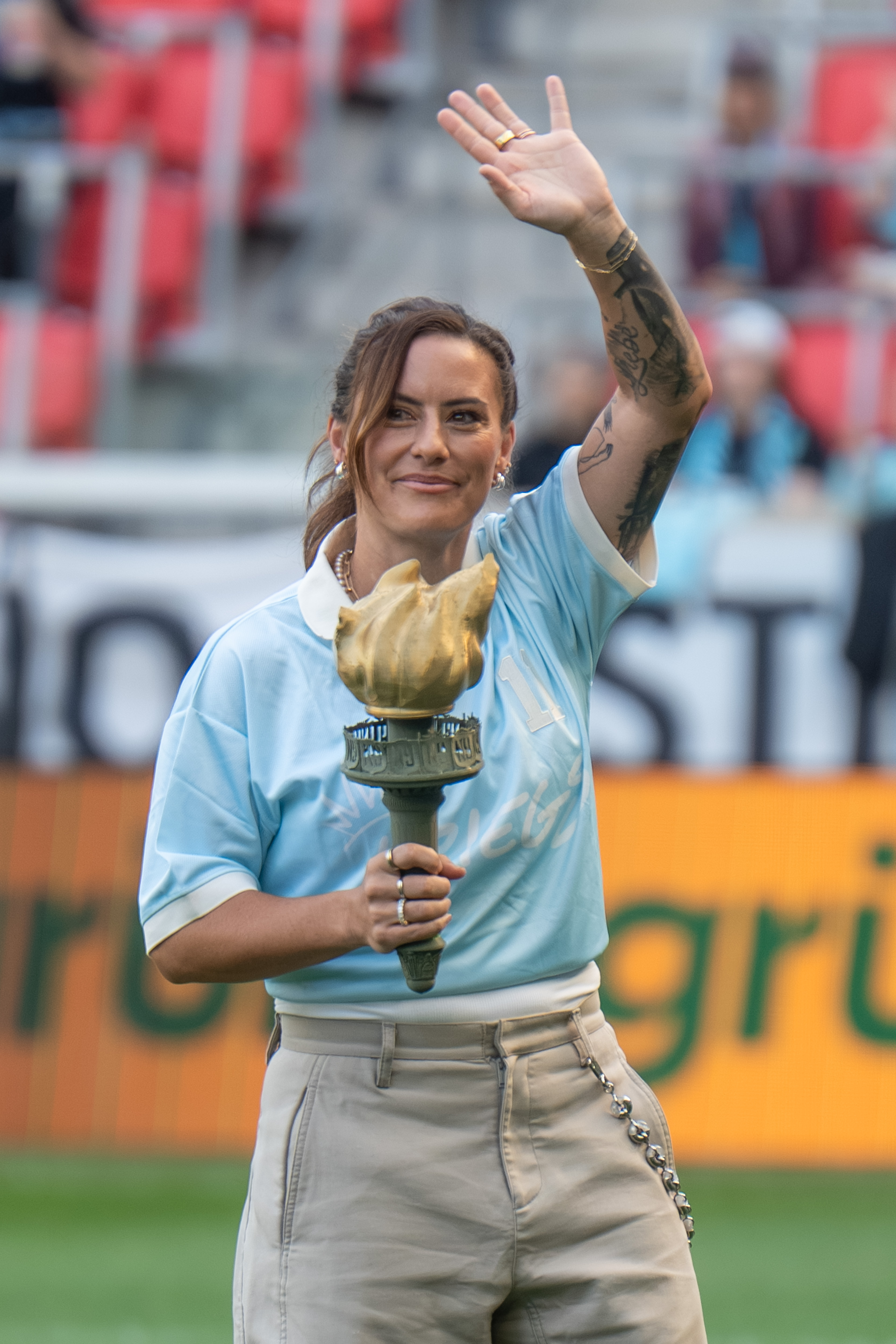
Krieger before Gotham FC vs Racing Louisville on Oct 19, 2025

On December 6, 2021, Krieger was traded alongside Ashlyn Harris to Gotham FC in exchange for a first-round pick in the 2022 NWSL Draft, a third-round pick in the 2023 NWSL Draft and $50,000 in allocation money.

In the final season before her retirement, Krieger won the 2023 NWSL Championship with Gotham. She was a finalist for NWSL Defender of the Year.

== International career ==
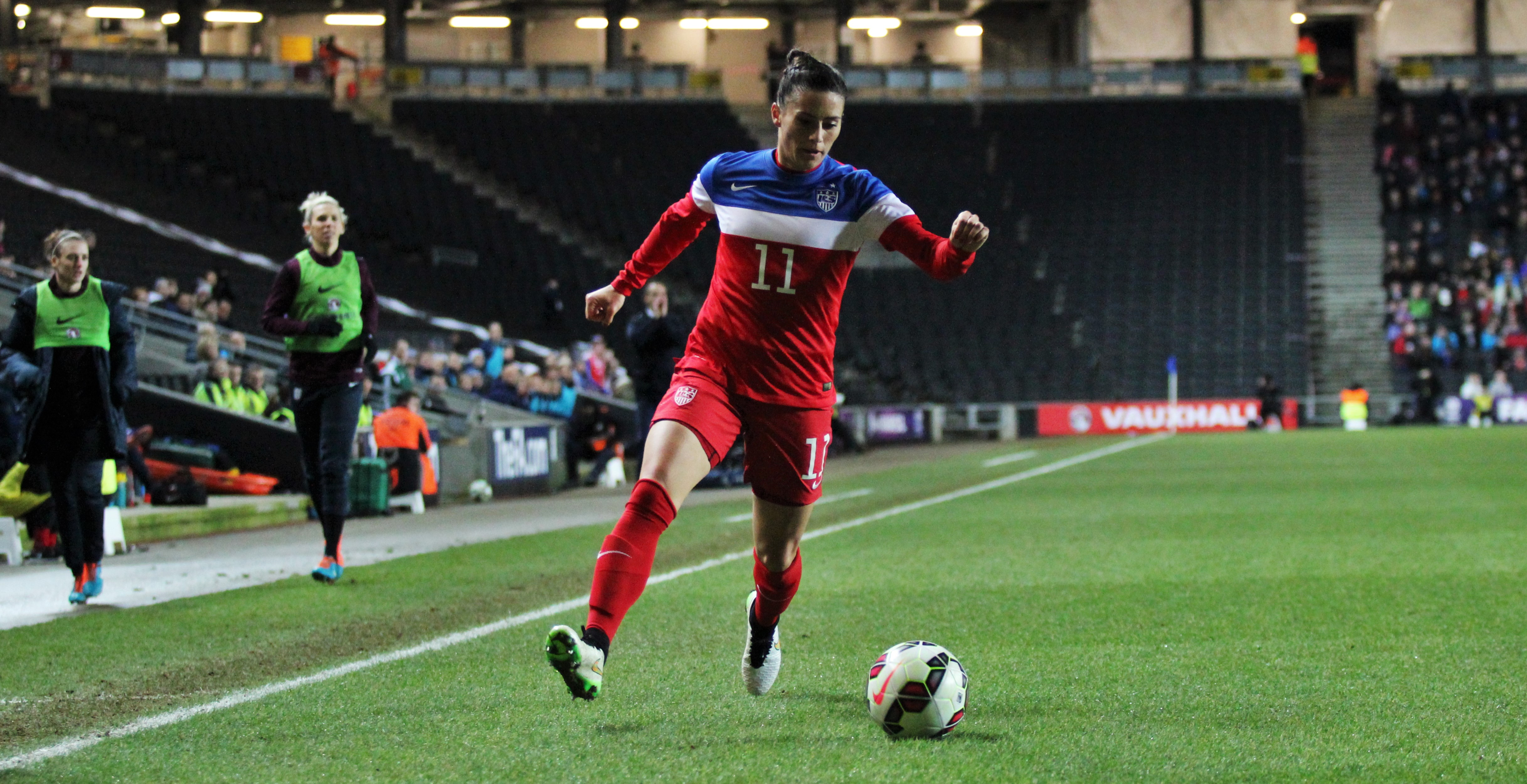

=== Senior national team ===
==== First cap and 2008 Summer Olympics ====
Krieger was first called up to the United States women's national team in January 2008 for a six-day training camp at The Home Depot Center in Carson, California from January 3 to 8. Immediately following the training camp, Krieger was named to the roster for the 2008 Four Nations Tournament held from January 16 to 20. Regarding her first roster appearance for the national team, Krieger stated that she felt "honored to be a part of the first roster of 2008, to be a part of this team and represent not only myself but my country." Krieger made her first appearance for the national team on January 16, 2008, in the team's first match of the Four Nations Tournament against Canada. Krieger started the match and played all 90 minutes, helping the United States defeat Canada 4–0. She made one other appearance during the tournament on January 18 in the match against Finland, a 4–1 in for the United States. The United States went on to win the tournament after a 1–0 victory over China. Krieger then went back to her club team, FFC Frankfurt, and did not join the national team again until late May for a training camp.

On June 23, 2008, Krieger was named an alternate for the 2008 Summer Olympics.

==== Return to the national team, 2010 ====
In May 2010, Krieger was named to a 22-player roster for a match against Germany on May 22. She made her first appearance with the national team since January 2008 during the match against Germany. Krieger came in for Heather Mitts in the second half to help the United States win the match. Krieger was then named to a 24-player roster for a pair of matches against Sweden in July. Krieger came in during the 77th minute of the first match on July 13 for an injured Amy LePeilbet. She made the start in the second match on July 17.

Krieger was named to a preliminary roster for matches against China in October in preparation for the 2010 CONCACAF Women's World Cup Qualifying tournament in late October. The 30 players on the roster trained in Kennesaw, Georgia leading up to the matches. Krieger was subsequently named one of the 18 players that would dress for the game on October 2. She played all 90 minutes of the match, helping the United States defeat China 2–1.

On October 13, Krieger was named to the roster for the 2010 CONCACAF Women's World Cup Qualifying tournament held from October 28 to November 8. With six caps for the national team, she was one of the least experienced players on the roster. Both of her appearances during the tournament were in matches against Costa Rica. The United States placed third place in the tournament and earned a berth in a two-game series against Italy to qualify for the last spot in the 2011 FIFA Women's World Cup. Krieger was named to the roster for those two matches on November 20 and 27. She came in for Heather Mitts during the 75th minute in the first match and the 76th minute in the second match to help the United States qualify for the 2011 FIFA Women's World Cup.

==== 2011 FIFA Women's World Cup ====
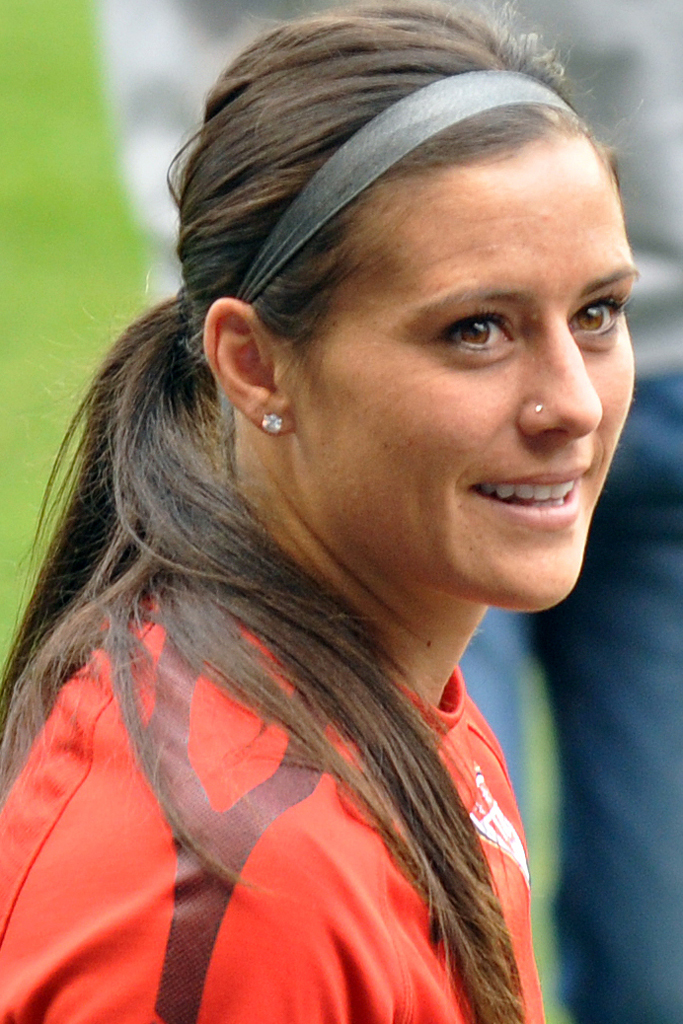
Krieger at a United States women's national team practice at Sporting KC Park in Kansas City in 2011

Krieger missed the 2011 Four Nations Tournament due to commitments with FFC Frankfurt and did not join the national team until February for the Algarve Cup in Portugal. Krieger made the start in the team's opening match against Japan on March 2 as well as the match against Norway on March 4. In the team's final group match on March 7, Krieger recorded her first assist and helped the United States defeat Finland. She started in the final against Iceland, helping the United States win the 2011 Algarve Cup title with a 4–2 win. Following the Algarve Cup, Krieger was named to the 23-player roster for a 20-day training camp in the United Kingdom in February and April. During the training camp, the United States played a match against England on April 2, during which Krieger made an appearance.

From April 18 to May 6, Krieger joined the national team for a three-week training camp in Florida. On May 9, following the training camp, Krieger was named to the 21-player roster for the 2011 FIFA Women's World Cup. Krieger trained with the team in June for eight days in Austria before going to Germany for the World Cup. Krieger started in all six matches of the World Cup. In the quarterfinals on July 10, the United States faced Brazil. After extra time, the score was tied 2–2, leaving the result of the match to a penalty shootout. Krieger scored the team's fifth and final penalty to win the match and advance to the semi-finals. The United States went on to be defeated by Japan in the final. Krieger was one of only four players for the United States to start and play all 600 minutes of the tournament. She was named to Fox Soccer's Best 11 as the best right back in the FIFA Women's World Cup.

Following the World Cup, Krieger trained with the national team for two weeks in November in Arizona leading into a match against Sweden on November 19. She was then named to 18-player game roster for the match against Sweden and made an appearance during the game. Following the match, Krieger was called up for an 18-day training camp in Carson, California at The Home Depot Center from December 3 to 20.

==== Injury and comeback, 2012 ====
Krieger started off the year at a nine-day training camp at The Home Depot Center in Carson, California from January 7 to 15 leading up to the 2012 CONCACAF Women's Olympic Qualifying tournament held in late January. Immediately following the training camp, Krieger was named to the 20-player roster for the tournament. In the first match of the tournament on January 20 against the Dominican Republic, was Krieger made the start. In the 40th minute, Krieger tackled by Dominican Republic's Leonela Mojica and she sustained a knee injury. An MRI confirmed that she had torn the medial collateral and anterior cruciate ligaments in her right knee. For the team's match against Mexico on January 25, the United States players wrote "liebe" on their arms as a tribute to Krieger. Krieger underwent surgery to repair her ACL on February 2. She spent three weeks in Virginia following her surgery before returning to Germany for intensive rehabilitation. Although she was able to fully recover in time for the 2012 Summer Olympics in London, the roster was named before her complete recovery.

==== 2013–2014 ====
Krieger made her return to the national team in January 2013, when she was called up to a 29-player training camp leading up to two matches against Scotland in early February. On February 21, Krieger was named to the 23-player roster for the 2013 Algarve Cup in Portugal that took place from March 6 to 13. On March 8, Krieger made her first international goal in the match against China. She was subsequently named Budweiser Woman of the Match. She also started in the match against Sweden on March 11 and the final match on March 13 to help the United States win the Algarve Cup title.

Following the 2013 Algarve Cup, Krieger traveled to Europe with the national team for matches against Germany and the Netherlands in early April. She appeared during the match against the Netherlands on April 9, a 3–1 win for the United States. In late May, Krieger was named to the 21-player roster that traveled to Canada to train in preparation for a match against Canada on June 2. She played all 90 minutes of the match to help the United States defeat Canada 3–0.

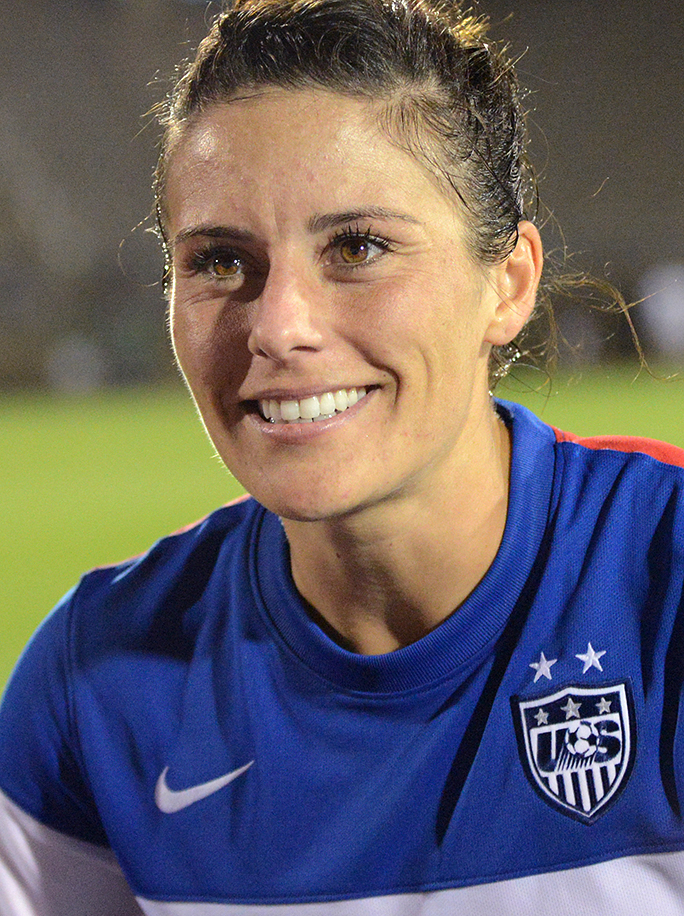
Krieger with the United States women's national team in June 2014

Krieger started off 2014 at a national team training camp from January 8 to 15 at U.S. Soccer's National Training Center in Carson, California. Following the training camp, Krieger appeared in a match against Canada on January 31 in Frisco, Texas. Krieger recorded an assist in a match against Russia on February 8, a 7–0 win for the United States. She also appeared in a second match against Russia on February 13. Following the matches against Russia, Krieger was named to the 24-player roster for the 2014 Algarve Cup that took place from March 5 to 12. She made the start during the team's first match of the tournament on March 5 against Japan, a 1–1 draw. She also started in the match against Sweden on March 7, a game that ended the 43-game unbeaten streak for the United States. Krieger started in the match against Korea DPR that secured their seventh-place finish in the tournament.

Krieger joined the team for a two-game series against China in April. She started in both matches. In late April, Krieger was named to a 22-player roster for a match against Canada on May 8. She played all 90 minutes in the match, which ended in a 1–1 draw. She was then named to the roster for two games against France on June 14 and 19. She started both matches. Krieger was named to a 19-player roster for a match against Switzerland on August 20 in Cary, North Carolina. She started the match and the United States went on the win 4–1.

Krieger joined the national team for a training camp at the end of August in order to prepare for two matches against Mexico in September as well as the 2014 CONCACAF Women's Qualifying tournament in October. She was subsequently named to the roster for the 2014 CONCACAF Women's Championship that served as a qualification for the 2015 FIFA Women's World Cup. Krieger made four appearances in the tournament. She started for the United States in their opening match against Trinidad & Tobago on October 15, which they won 1–0. She also appeared in the team's second group match against Guatemala on October 17, a 5–0 win for the United States. Her third appearance during the tournament came during the semifinal match against Mexico on October 24. She played all 90 minutes to help the United States advance to the final and qualify for the 2015 FIFA Women's World Cup. Her fourth appearance of the tournament came during the final against Costa Rica on October 26, helping the United States win the tournament.

Following the CONCACAF Qualifying tournament, Krieger was named to the 24-player roster for the International Tournament of Brasilia in Brazil that took place from December 10 to 21. She made the start during the team's opening match against China on December 10, which resulted in a 1–1 draw. She came in for Lori Chalupny during the 31st minute of the match against Brazil on December 14. Krieger made an assist in the match against Argentina on December 18. Krieger made an appearance in the final against Brazil. The game was a 0–0 draw, but the tournament title was given to Brazil, who had more points from the group stage.

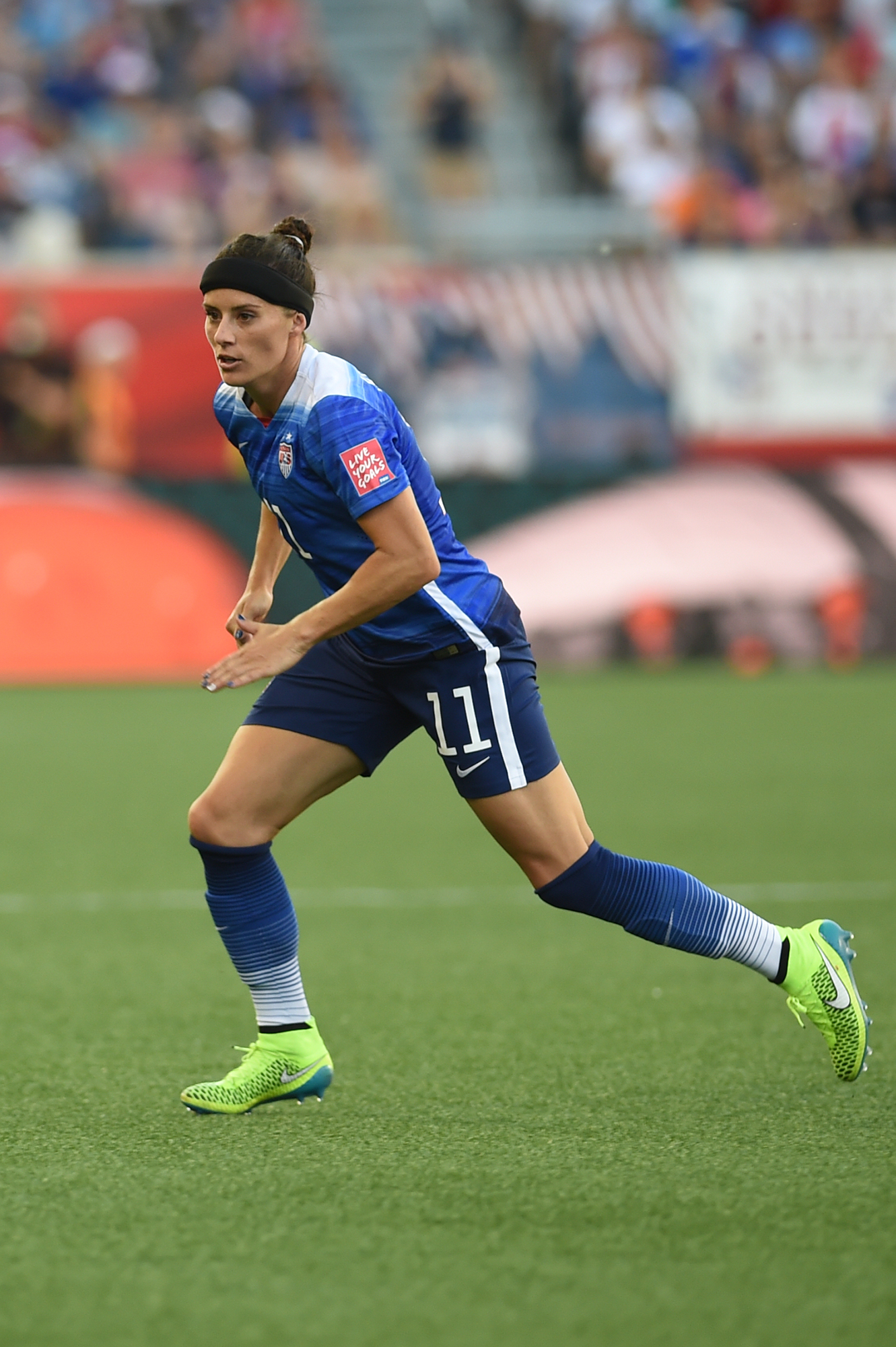
Ali Krieger in 2015 Women's World Cup in Winnipeg (June 12, 2015)

==== 2015 FIFA Women's World Cup ====
Krieger started off the year at a 21-day training camp in 2015 from January 5 to 25 at the U.S. Soccer National Training Center in Carson, California. Following the training camp, Krieger was named to the 24-player team that would travel on a 13-day trip to Europe for matches against France and England in mid-February. Krieger came in during the 55th minute of the match against France on February 8. She also played all 90 minutes in the match against England on February 13, which was a shutout victory for the United States.

On February 21, Krieger was named to the 25-player roster for the 2015 Algarve Cup in Portugal. Krieger made a key save during the team's first match on March 4 when she blocked a shot by Norway's Emilie Haavi. She started in the final match of the tournament against France on March 11. The United States won the match and took away the Algarve Cup title. She was then named to a 25-player roster on March 20 for a match against New Zealand on April 4 in St. Louis. She started in the match, helping the United States defeat New Zealand 4–0.

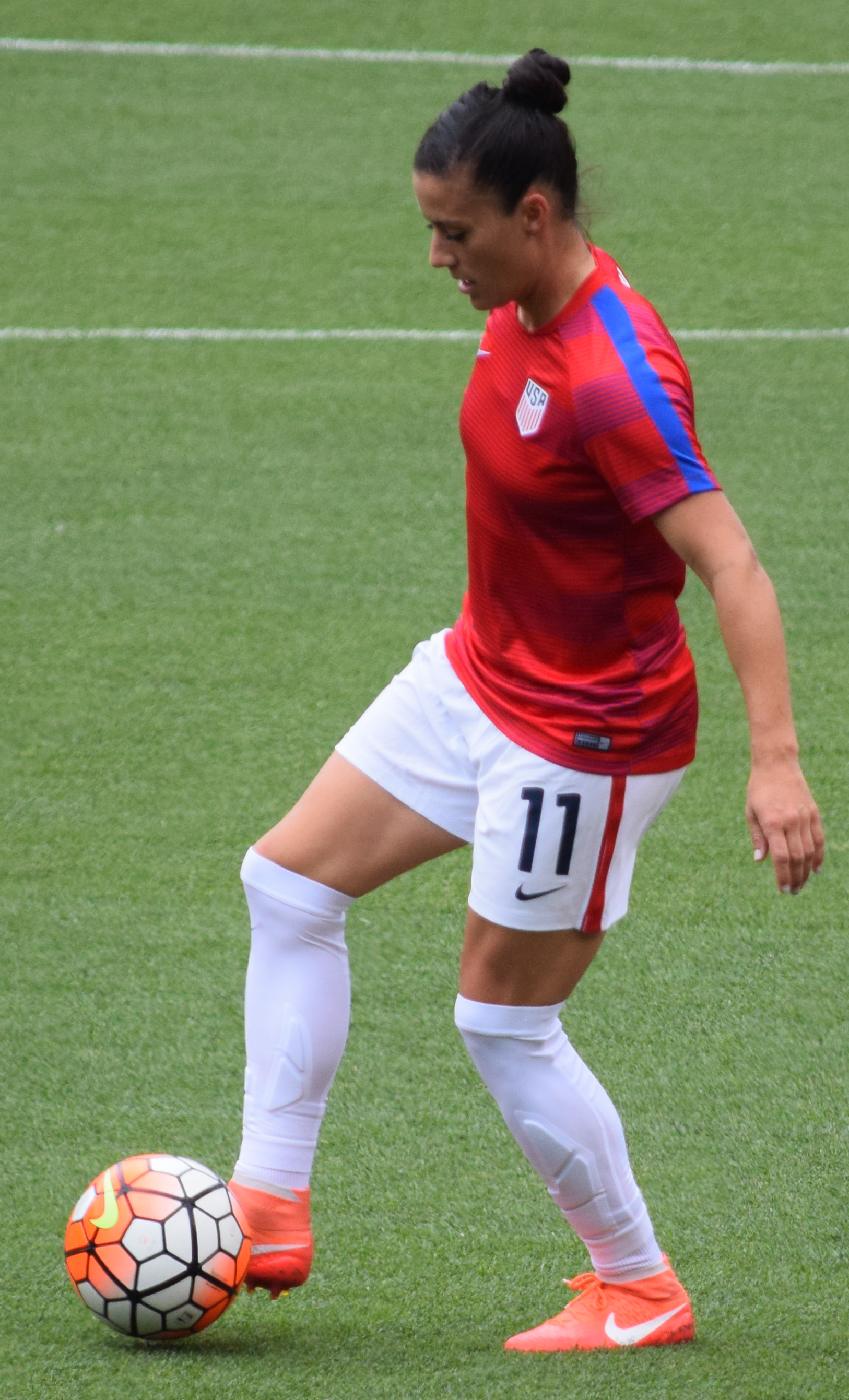
Krieger before the match against Japan on June 5, 2016

On April 14, 2015, Krieger was named to the 23-player roster that would represent the United States at the 2015 FIFA Women's World Cup. She started all seven games of the tournament for the United States and played all but 10 minutes. She was a part of the defense that allowed three goals in all seven games and recorded five consecutive shut outs. Krieger became a World Cup Champion on July 5, when she helped the United States defeat Japan 5–2 in the Women's World Cup final. Krieger joined the national team on a Victory Tour following their World Cup win that started in Pittsburgh, Pennsylvania on August 16 and ended in New Orleans, Louisiana on December 16.

==== 2016 Summer Olympics ====
Krieger joined the national team for their first training camp of the year at the U.S. Soccer National Training Center in Carson, California from January 5 to 21. She was then named to the 20-player roster for 2016 CONCACAF Women's Olympic Qualifying. The United States qualified to the 2016 Olympic Games in Rio de Janeiro after a semifinal win against Trinidad & Tobago on February 19. The United States won the tournament after defeating Canada 2–0. Following the tournament.

Krieger was named to the roster for the 2016 SheBelieves Cup that took place from March 3 to 9. She came in for Kelley O'Hara in the 80th minute of the team's opening match of the tournament on March 3 against England. She also made an appearance in the final match of the tournament, helping the United States win the 2016 SheBelieves Cup with a 2–1 win over Germany in their final game.

Krieger joined a 23-player roster for a training camp ahead of two matches against Colombia in early April. She appeared in both matches, but did not play all 90 minutes in either game. Krieger was on the roster for another two-game series against Japan in early June. On June 5, Krieger came in for Crystal Dunn during the 75th minute of the match. The game was abandoned in the 76th minute due to inclement weather and the United States won 2–0.

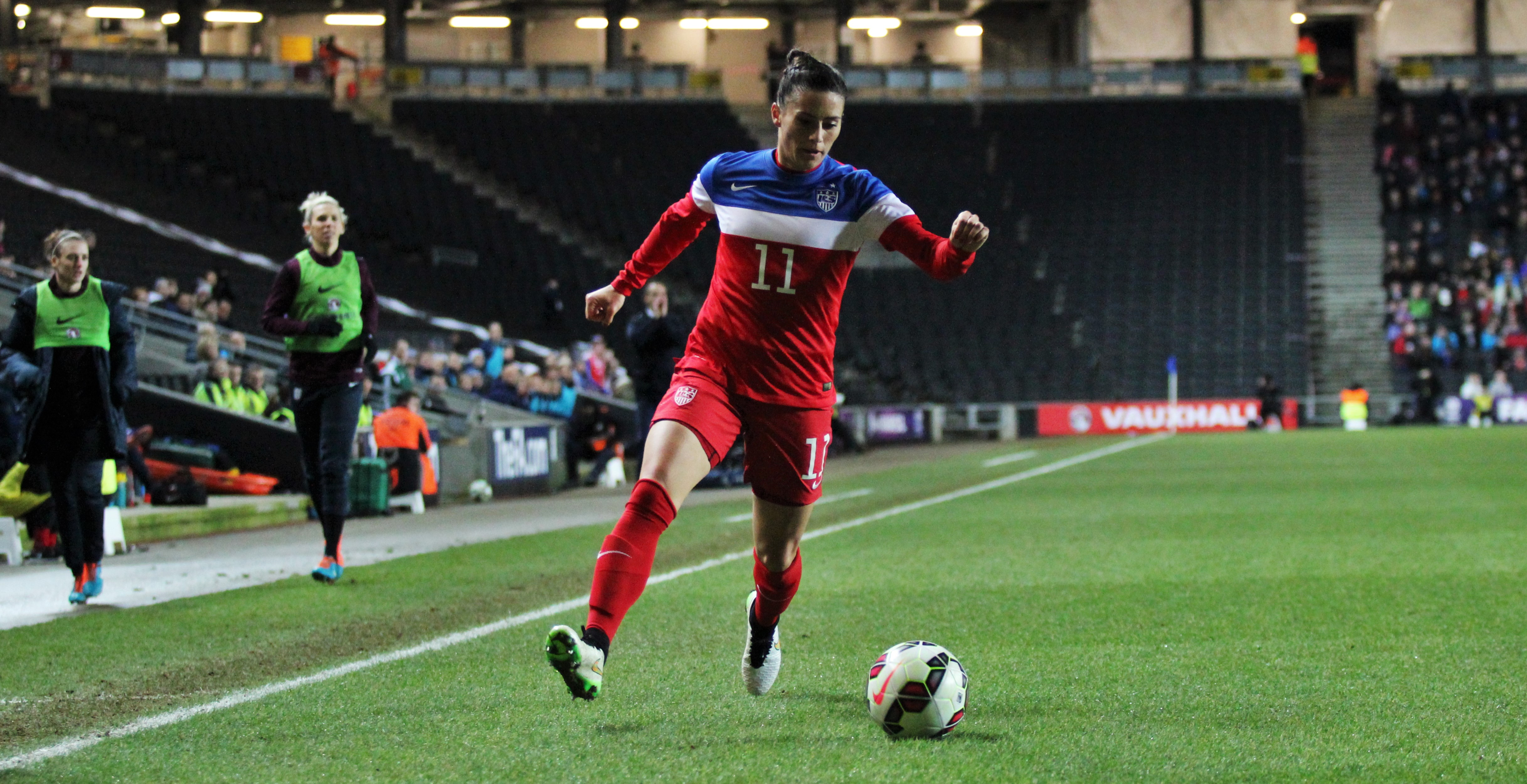

On July 12, 2016, Krieger was named to the 18-player team that would represent the United States at the 2016 Olympic Games in Rio de Janeiro. She made her Olympic debut on August 6 in the team's second group match against France. She replaced Crystal Dunn in the 70th minute to help the United States secure their first-place finish in the group with a 1–0 victory over France. On August 9, Krieger played all 90 minutes of the team's final group match against Colombia.

Following the Olympics Krieger was called up for friendlies in September and November 2016. She finished the year with 17 appearances and 792 minutes played.

==== 2017–2020 ====
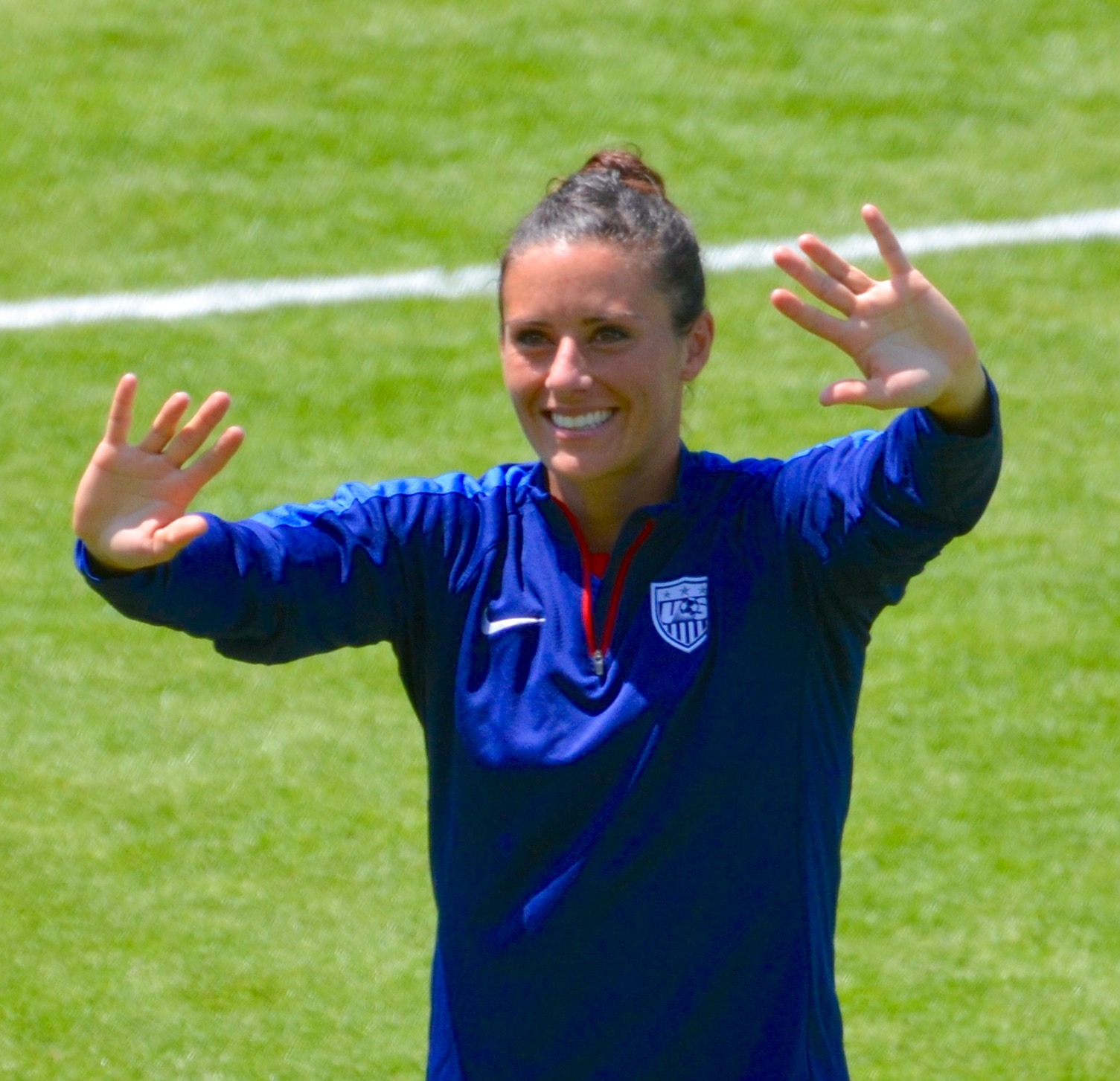

In 2017 Krieger received limited call-ups and only appeared in two games. She was on the roster for the 2017 Tournament of Nations but did not appear in any games.

After not receiving a call-up for 18 months, Krieger was included on the USWNT roster for April 2019 friendlies against Australia and Belgium. While Krieger did not see any playing time against Australia, she played a full 90' against Belgium on April 7, two years and a day after her previous national team cap.

In May 2019, despite earning only one cap in the previous 25 months, Krieger was named to the final 23-player squad for the 2019 FIFA Women's World Cup, marking her third World Cup appearance. She earned her 100th cap for the national team on May 16, 2019, coming on as a second-half substitute in the team's warm-up friendly against New Zealand. Krieger made three appearances during the tournament including as a halftime substitute during the final against the Netherlands as the USWNT won 2–0 to successfully defend its World Cup title.

Krieger was named to the US roster for the 2020 CONCACAF Women's Olympic Qualifying Championship, which the United States won to secure their place in the 2020 Olympics.

She was also called up for the 2020 SheBelieves Cup.

On March 23, 2023, during an interview on CBS Mornings, Krieger announced that she would retire from soccer at the end of the 2023 NWSL season.

== Career statistics ==
=== Club ===
As of match played November 12, 2023.

Club	Season	League			Cup (Note: Includes DFB-Pokal Frauen, Svenska Cupen and NWSL Challenge Cup)		Continental (Note: UEFA Women's Champions League)		Playoffs		Other		Total	
Club	Season	Division	Apps	Goals	Apps	Goals	Apps	Goals	Apps	Goals	Apps	Goals	Apps	Goals
1. FFC Frankfurt	2007–08	Bundesliga	19	1	1	0	—		—		3 (Note: Bundesliga Cup)	0	23	1
1. FFC Frankfurt	2008–09	Bundesliga	4	0	0	0	—		—		—		4	0
1. FFC Frankfurt	2009–10	Bundesliga	15	0	2	0	—		—		—		17	0
1. FFC Frankfurt	2010–11	Bundesliga	14	0	4	0	—		—		—		18	0
1. FFC Frankfurt	2011–12	Bundesliga	11	1	3	0	4	0	—		—		18	1
1. FFC Frankfurt	2012–13	Bundesliga	6	0	1	0	—		—		—		7	0
Tyresö FF (loan)	2013	Damallsvenskan	7	0	1	0	4	0	—		—		12	0
Tyresö FF (loan)	Total		76	2	12	0	8	0	0	0	3	0	99	2
Washington Spirit	2013	NWSL	18	1	—		—		—		—		18	1
Washington Spirit	2014	NWSL	22	1	—		—		1	0	—		23	1
Washington Spirit	2015	NWSL	7	0	—		—		1	0	—		8	0
Washington Spirit	2016	NWSL	15	1	—		—		2	1	—		17	2
Orlando Pride	2017	NWSL	24	0	—		—		1	0	—		25	0
Orlando Pride	2018	NWSL	19	0	—		—		—		—		19	0
Orlando Pride	2019	NWSL	12	0	—		—		—		—		12	0
Orlando Pride	2020	NWSL	—		—		—		—		4 (Note: 2020 NWSL Fall Series)	0	4	0
Orlando Pride	2021	NWSL	23	0	3	0	—		—		—		26	0
NJ/NY Gotham FC	2022	NWSL	18	0	5	0	—		—		—		23	0
NJ/NY Gotham FC	2023	NWSL	17	0	5	0	—		3	0	—		25	0
NJ/NY Gotham FC	Total		175	3	13	0	0	0	8	1	4	0	200	4
Career total			251	5	25	0	8	0	8	1	7	0	299	6

=== International goals ===
Goal	Date	Location	Opponent	Lineup	Min	Score	Result	Competition
1	2013-03-08	Albufeira	China	Start	32	2–0	5–0	2013 Algarve Cup – group stage

== Outside of professional soccer ==
=== Media ===
After retiring, Krieger became the host of the ESPN show Futbol W.

=== Philanthropy ===
Krieger teamed up with the charity MiracleFeet in 2014. MiracleFeet is an organization that works to treat children with clubfoot in developing countries. Regarding her involvement with MiracleFeet, Krieger stated that it "means the world to [her] to be able to have this opportunity to help transform a kid's life."

Krieger also works with Garth Brooks' Teammates For Kids Foundation, where she spends time with children in various programs.

In June 2015, Krieger became an ambassador for the non-profit organization Athlete Ally, which works to end homophobia and transphobia in sports. Krieger believes creating an accepting environment on and off the field, as Athlete Ally strives to do, is important for athletes and is the reason she joined the organization.

=== Coaching ===
Following the 2018 NWSL season, Krieger was one of 21 NWSL players who participated in a series of coaching licensure courses co-sponsored by U.S. Soccer, the NWSL, and Utah Royals FC. Krieger, who earned her U.S. Soccer "C" license following the course, has expressed interest in coaching at the professional or national team level.

=== Endorsements ===
Krieger became a professional athlete with Nike in 2007 and exclusively wears Nike cleats and training gear. Krieger and teammate Sydney Leroux introduced Sydney + Ali's Dynamic Duo Workout on the Nike+ Training Club app in 2014. In 2015, Krieger appeared in the Nike+ Training Club 90-Day Better For It Challenge alongside teammates Carli Lloyd and Christen Press. The campaign combined various Nike+ workouts into a fitness program.

Following the concussion she sustained while with the Washington Spirit in April 2015, Krieger teamed up with Unequal, which makes protective sports gear. When she returned to play following the concussion, she wore a protective headband provided by Unequal.

Krieger teamed up with both ZICO and Smuckers for the 2016 Summer Olympics in Rio. She was featured in a series of promotions as a part of ZICO's Olympic campaign and exclusive content about Krieger would be released by Smuckers, an official sponsor of the 2016 U.S. Olympic and Paralympic Teams.

== Honors ==
Following the United States' win at the 2015 FIFA Women's World Cup, Krieger and her teammates became the first women's sports team to be honored with a ticker tape parade in New York City. Each player received a key to the city from Mayor Bill de Blasio. In October of the same year, the team was honored by President Barack Obama at the White House.

Krieger was featured along with her national teammates in the EA Sports' FIFA video game series in FIFA 16, the first time women players were included in the game.

== Personal life ==
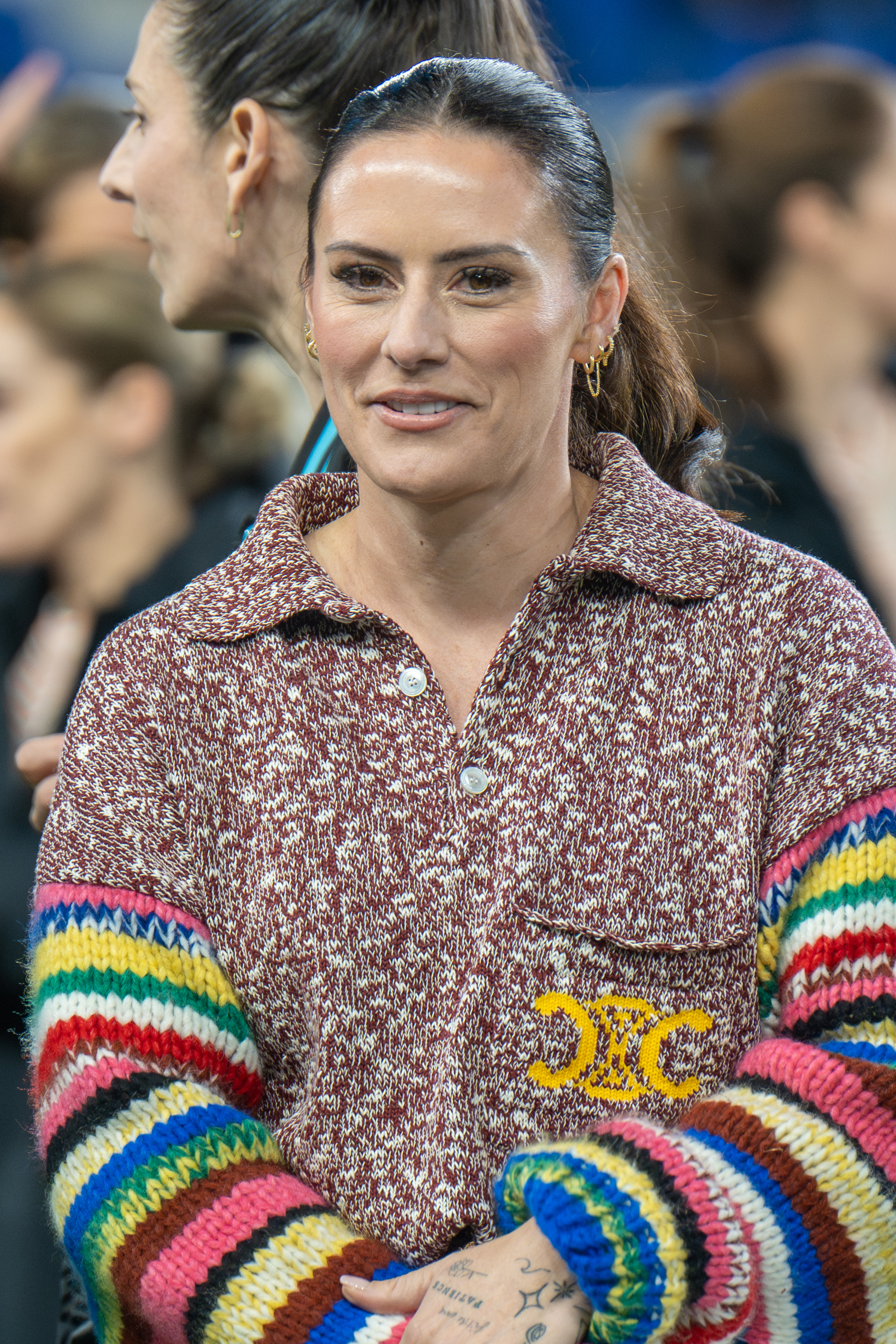
Krieger in 2026

Krieger's last name means "warrior" in German, a language she became fluent in during her time with FFC Frankfurt. Her teammates often call her "The Warrior Princess" due to the origin of her name and her personality.

Krieger is very close with her brother, Kyle. He is a YouTube and Instagram personality who has talked openly about his previous drug and alcohol problems. Regarding her relationship with her brother, Krieger has stated: "I have fallen a few times and each time I have gotten up and grown as a person and looked at things a little differently. That is where I have learned so much from Kyle. (Seeing him) struggling through addiction and alcoholism and overcoming that and overcoming adversity, for me that's just an unreal role model in my life. It is like night and day. For two years of my life he was absent, in and out of my life. To look at how far he has come it is just so rewarding to see."

On March 13, 2019, Krieger announced her engagement to longtime girlfriend Ashlyn Harris. Harris is also a soccer player who played with Krieger on the Washington Spirit, Orlando Pride, NJ/NY Gotham, and the national team. The two got married on December 28, 2019, in Miami. On February 14, 2021, the couple announced the adoption of their daughter, born two days earlier. On August 16, 2022, they announced the adoption of their son. On September 19, 2023, Harris filed for divorce.

On Thanksgiving 2024, Krieger confirmed that she and Jen Beattie were in a relationship.

== Honors and awards ==
Washington Freedom

- W-League Championship: 2007

FFC Frankfurt

- UEFA Women's Cup: 2008
- Frauen-Bundesliga: 2008
- DFB-Pokal Frauen: 2008, 2011

NJ/NY Gotham FC

- NWSL Championship: 2023

United States

- FIFA Women's World Cup: 2015, 2019
- CONCACAF Women's Championship: 2014
- CONCACAF Women's Olympic Qualifying Tournament: 2016; 2020
- SheBelieves Cup: 2016, 2020
- Algarve Cup: 2013, 2015

Individual

- Washington Post Distinguished All-Met Award: 2013
- NWSL Best XI: 2014, 2017, 2019, 2023
- NWSL Second XI: 2013, 2016
- Fox Soccer's Best Eleven of FIFA Women's World Cup: 2011
- FIFPro: FIFA FIFPro World XI 2016
- IFFHS CONCACAF Woman Team of the Decade 2011–2020
- Big Ten All-Freshman: 2003
- Soccer Buzz Freshman All-America Third Team: 2003
- Soccer Buzz Mid-Atlantic Region All-Freshman
- NSCAA All-Mid-Atlantic Region First Team: 2004, 2005, 2006
- All-Big Ten First Team: 2004, 2005, 2006
- Academic All-Big Ten: 2004, 2005, 2006
- Soccer Buzz All-Mid-Atlantic Region Second Team: 2004
- NSCAA All-America First Team: 2005, 2006
- Soccer Buzz All-Mid-Atlantic Region First Team: 2005, 2006
- Big Ten All-Tournament Team: 2006
- Big Ten Defensive Player of the Year: 2006
- Soccer Buzz Mid-Atlantic Region Player of the Year: 2006
- Soccer Buzz All-America Third Team: 2006
- Soccer America Collegiate MVP: 2006
- Penn State Most Valuable Player: 2006
- NCAA Co-Defensive Player of the Year: 2006
- Herman Trophy Award Semifinalist: 2006

== See also ==
- List of Pennsylvania State University Olympians
