= Alyssa Kleiner =

American soccer player

Personal information
- Full name: Alyssa Kleiner
- Date of birth: April 1, 1993 (age 33)
- Place of birth: Las Vegas, Nevada
- Height: 5 ft 9 in (1.75 m)
- Position: Defender

College career
Years	Team	Apps	(Gls)
2011–2014	Santa Clara Broncos		

Senior career*
Years	Team	Apps	(Gls)
2015	Portland Thorns FC	8	(0)
2016–2017	Washington Spirit	35	(1)
2018	Seattle Reign FC	10	(0)
- * Club domestic league appearances and goals

Alyssa Kleiner (born April 1, 1993) is an American retired soccer player who played as a defender for the Portland Thorns, Washington Spirit, and Seattle Reign in the National Women's Soccer League (NWSL).

== Club career ==
Kleiner played for Portland Thorns FC in 2015, appearing in 8 games. In February 2016, she was traded to Washington Spirit in exchange for Katherine Reynolds. In 2016, Kleiner played 17 regular season matches, 12 starts, totaling 1115 minutes She also subbed into the NWSL Championship for an injured Caprice Dydasco. Kleiner scored her first professional goal against Sky Blue FC on July 31. She also had one assist to her name on the season. She was waived by the Spirit before the 2018 season, then signed with Seattle Reign FC on May 1, 2018.

== Career statistics ==
Appearances and goals by club, season and competition
Club	Season	League			Playoffs (Note: Includes NWSL playoffs)		Total	
Club	Season	Division	Apps	Goals	Apps	Goals	Apps	Goals
Portland Thorns FC	2015	NWSL	8	0	—		8	0
Washington Spirit	2016	NWSL	17	1	1	0	18	1
Washington Spirit	2017	NWSL	18	0	—		18	0
Seattle Reign FC	2018	NWSL	10	0	0	0	10	0
Career total			53	1	1	0	54	1
