= Katherine Reynolds =

American soccer player

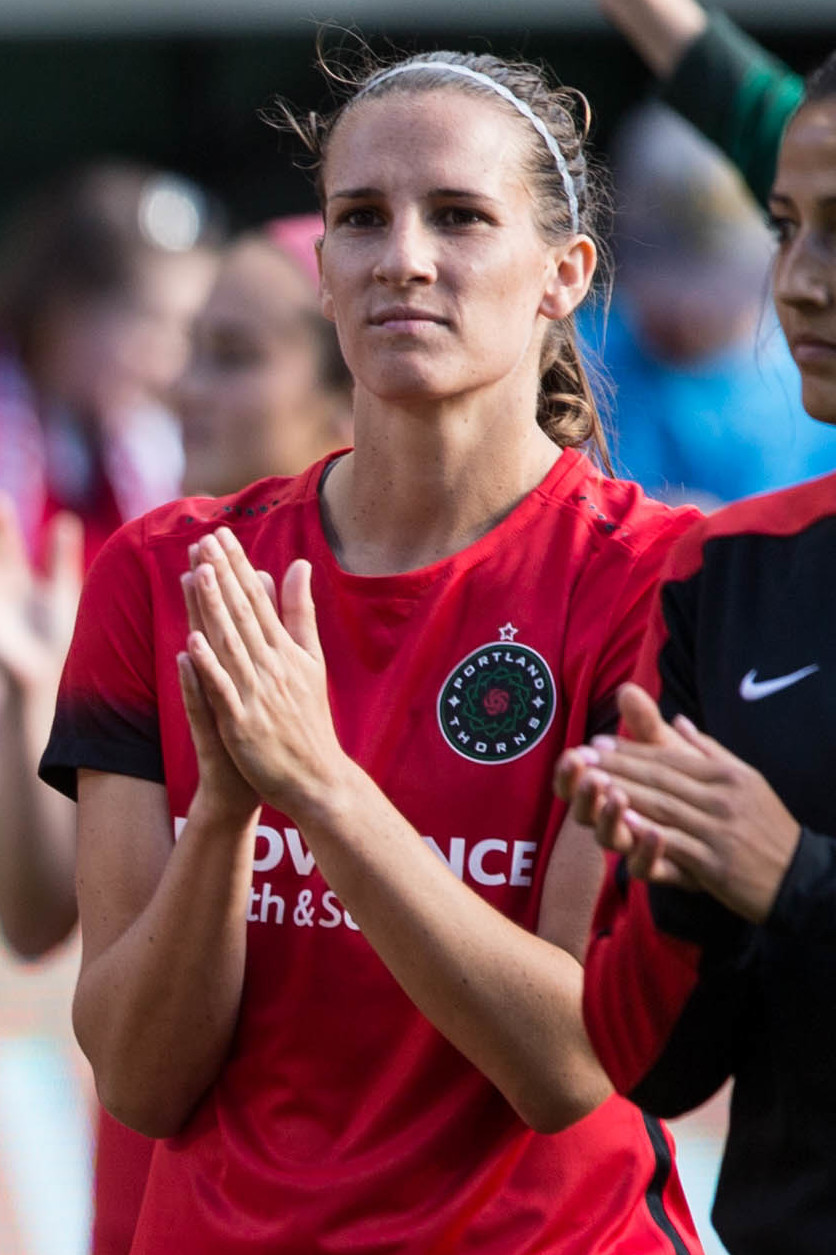
- Reynolds with the Portland Thorns in 2016

Personal information
- Full name: Katherine Alexandra Reynolds
- Date of birth: September 14, 1987 (age 39)
- Place of birth: San Clemente, California, United States
- Height: 5 ft 8 in (1.73 m)
- Position: Defender

Youth career
- Eastside F.C.

College career
Years	Team	Apps	(Gls)
2006–2009	Santa Clara Broncos		

Senior career*
Years	Team	Apps	(Gls)
2006–2009	Seattle Sounders Women	18	(3)
2010	Philadelphia Independence	3	(0)
2011	Atlanta Beat	18	(0)
2012	Western New York Flash		(0)
2012–2013	SC Freiburg	16	(0)
2013–2014	Western New York Flash	41	(0)
2014	Newcastle Jets	12	(0)
2015	Washington Spirit	18	(0)
2016–2020	Portland Thorns	50	(1)

International career
2007–2011	United States U-23		
- * Club domestic league appearances and goals

Katherine Alexandra Reynolds (born September 14, 1987) is an American former professional soccer player who last played in 2020 as a defender for the Portland Thorns of the National Women's Soccer League (NWSL). She previously played for the Philadelphia Independence and Atlanta Beat of Women's Professional Soccer (WPS), Western New York Flash and Washington Spirit of the NWSL, and Newcastle Jets in the Australian W-League, as well as the United States U-23 women's national soccer team. She won the NWSL Championship in 2017 with the Thorns.

== Early life ==
Born in San Clemente, California, Reynolds was raised in Medina, Washington, a suburb east of Seattle. She attended University Prep where she was a three-time MVP and captained the team to the state title in 2004.

Reynolds was a member of the Region IV Olympic Development Program (ODP) team. She also played nine years for Eastside F.C. and played for the Seattle Sounder Saints in 2006. Reynolds was named Washington State Soccer Athlete of the Year and was named to the league's first team all four years. She also ran track, played basketball and tennis, was a two-time Track Athlete of the Year, and was an eight-time State Champion on the track.

=== Santa Clara University ===
Reynolds attended Santa Clara University from 2006 to 2009. She made 67 appearances for the Broncos. During her senior year, she started in all 22 games and was named to the MAC Hermann Trophy watch list. She also received NSCAA All-West Region Second Team recognition and was named to both the WCC Preseason All-Conference Team and the All-WCC Academic Team.

== Club career ==
=== Seattle Sounders Women ===
Reynolds played for the Seattle Sounders Women from 2006 to 2009. In 2009, the team took third in the W-League's Western Conference.

=== Philadelphia Independence ===
After being selected 34th overall by the Boston Breakers in the 2010 WPS Draft, Reynolds was later traded to the Philadelphia Independence for the 2010 WPS season. She made two appearances for the club.

=== Atlanta Beat ===
Reynolds signed with the Atlanta Beat for the 2011 WPS season. She made 18 starts in 18 matches playing a total of 1,602 minutes.

=== Western New York Flash (WPSL Elite), 2012 ===
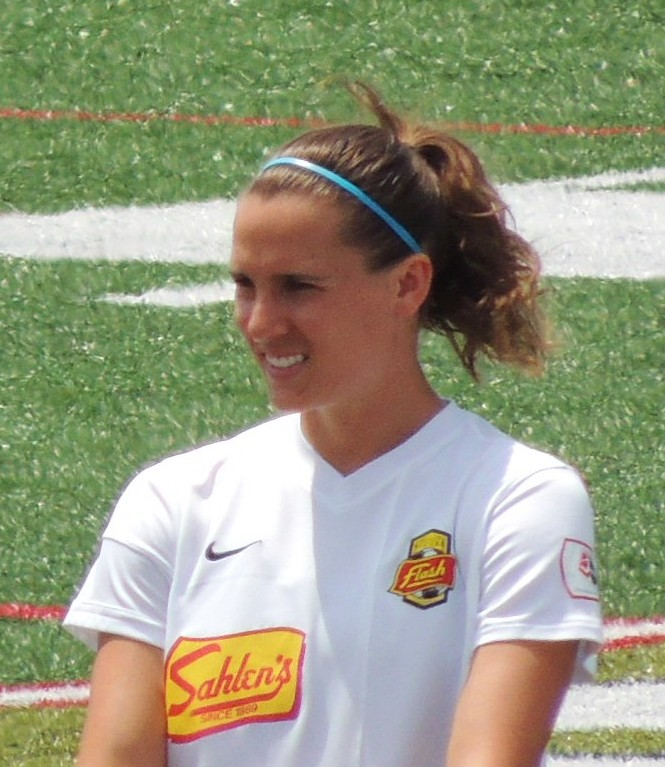
Reynolds with the Western New York Flash in 2013

After the WPS suspended operations in early 2012, Reynolds signed with the Western New York Flash in the Women's Premier Soccer League Elite and helped the squad win the league title after scoring during the penalty shootout of the championship match.

=== SC Freiburg, Bundesliga (women) ===
Reynolds played for German side SC Freiburg of the Frauen-Bundesliga for the 2012–2013 season. She made 16 starts in 16 matches, playing for a total of 1,440 minutes.

=== Western New York Flash (NWSL), 2013–2014 ===
In 2013, Reynolds returned to the Western New York Flash for the inaugural season of the National Women's Soccer League (NWSL). Upon her signing, Flash coach Aaran Lines said, "I'm very excited to have Reynolds back with us for her second stint at the club after gaining valuable experience with SC Freiburg in the German Bundesliga. She was instrumental in our success last season and I expect her to play a big role for us at outside back again!" The Flash reached the final of the 2013 NWSL Championship, falling there to Reynold's future team, the Portland Thorns.

==== Newcastle Jets, 2014–15 (loan) ====
In September 2014, Reynolds joined the Newcastle Jets in Australia's W-League together with fellow Americans Angela Salem and Tori Huster.

=== Washington Spirit, 2015 ===
Following the 2014 NWSL season, the Flash traded Reynolds and Angela Salem to the Washington Spirit for Jordan Angeli and a first-round pick—sixth overall—in the 2015 NWSL College Draft. That pick later became Lynn Williams. In the Spirit's 2015 season, Reynolds played for 1,611 minutes in 18 games (all starts).

=== Portland Thorns, 2016–2020 ===
Before the 2016 NWSL season, the Spirit traded Reynolds to the Portland Thorns in exchange for defender Alyssa Kleiner. Reynolds thus stayed with head coach Mark Parsons, who moved from the Spirit to the Thorns in the same off-season.

Reynolds missed the first 14 games of the 2017 season due to a groin injury. In the 2017 Playoffs she played all 90 minutes in the Semi-Final and Championship game, helping the Thorns win the 2017 NWSL Championship.

On May 30, 2018, Reynolds played in her 100th NWSL game, in which she scored her first career goal in a 4–1 loss to the North Carolina Courage. On July 21 in a game against Sky Blue FC, she suffered a torn right medial collateral ligament (MCL), which would require surgery and end her 2018 season.

In September 2020, Reynolds was part of the Thorns team that won the NWSL Fall Series.

On Oct. 30, 2020, Reynolds announced her retirement from professional soccer.

== International career ==
Reynolds represented the United States as a member of the United States U-23 women's national soccer team.

== Personal ==
On Sept. 1, 2018, Reynolds married Tucker Hopp.

== Honors ==
Western New York Flash

- NWSL Shield: 2013

Portland Thorns FC

- NWSL Shield: 2016
- NWSL Championship: 2017
