= 2016 National Women's Soccer League season =

4th season of the National Women's Soccer League

National Women's Soccer League
- Season: 2016
- Champions: Western New York Flash
- NWSL Shield: Portland Thorns FC
- Matches: 100
- Goals: 263 (2.63 per match)
- Top goalscorer: Kealia Ohai; Lynn Williams (11 goals)
- Biggest home win: 6 goals: WNY 7–1 BOS (Jun 24)
- Biggest away win: 4 goals: BOS 0–4 WNY (Sep 24)
- Highest scoring: 8 goals: WNY 7–1 BOS (Jun 24)
- Longest winning run: 4 games: Portland Thorns FC (June 17 – July 2) (Sept 4 – Sept 25)
- Longest unbeaten run: 12 games: Portland Thorns FC (Apr 17 – July 2)
- Longest winless run: 8 games: Orlando Pride (July 16 – Sept 24)
- Longest losing run: 6 games: Houston Dash (May 14 – Jul 10)
- Highest attendance: 23,403; ORL 3–1 HOU (Apr 23)
- Lowest attendance: 1,252; NJ 1–2 WNY (May 7)
- Total attendance: 555,775
- Average attendance: 5,558
- All statistics correct as of September 25, 2016.

The 2016 National Women's Soccer League season was the fourth season of the National Women's Soccer League, the top division of women's soccer in the United States. Including the NWSL's two professional predecessors, Women's Professional Soccer (2009–2011) and the Women's United Soccer Association (2001–2003), it was the tenth overall season of FIFA and USSF-sanctioned top division women's soccer in the United States. The league was operated by the United States Soccer Federation and received significant financial backing from that body. Further financial backing was provided by the Canadian Soccer Association. Both national federations paid the league salaries of many of their respective national team members in an effort to nurture talent in those nations.

To accommodate the 2016 Olympics, the league suspended play for most of the month of August. In addition, the league did not schedule games during FIFA windows, leaving the 20-game, 19-week regular season ending in late September for the second year in a row.

In the regular season, the Portland Thorns topped the standings and thus won the NWSL Shield. In the playoffs, the Washington Spirit and Western New York Flash won their opening matches to set up a meeting in the final. They tied 2-2 after extra time, with the Flash winning 3-2 on penalties to take the NWSL Championship.

== Teams, stadiums, and personnel ==
=== Stadiums and locations ===
Two teams, the Dash and Reign, do not make their stadiums' entire capacity available for home games, instead restricting ticket sales at a lower level. The full capacities of their venues are included in parentheses and italics.

Team	Stadium	Capacity
Boston Breakers	Soldiers Field Soccer Stadium	4,500
Chicago Red Stars	Toyota Park	20,000
Houston Dash	BBVA Compass Stadium	7,000 (22,039)
FC Kansas City	Swope Soccer Village (primary); Children's Mercy Park (secondary)	4,000; 18,467
Orlando Pride	Camping World Stadium	60,219
Portland Thorns	Providence Park	21,144
Seattle Reign FC	Memorial Stadium	7,000 (12,000)
Sky Blue FC	Yurcak Field	5,000
Washington Spirit	Maryland SoccerPlex	5,126
Western New York Flash	Rochester Rhinos Stadium	13,768

Locations of teams for the 2016 National Women's Soccer League season.

=== Personnel and sponsorship ===
Note: All of the teams use Nike as their kit manufacturer.

Team	Head coach	Captain	Shirt sponsor
Boston Breakers	(England) Matt Beard	(United States) Whitney Engen (United States) Kassey Kallman	Steward Health Care
Chicago Red Stars	(United States) Rory Dames	(United States) Christen Press	Illinois Bone and Joint Institute
Houston Dash	(United States) Randy Waldrum	(United States) Kealia Ohai	BBVA Compass
FC Kansas City	(North Macedonia) Vlatko Andonovski	(United States) Becky Sauerbrunn	Domino's
Orlando Pride	(Scotland) Tom Sermanni	(United States) Alex Morgan	Orlando Health
Portland Thorns	(England) Mark Parsons	(Canada) Christine Sinclair (United States) Tobin Heath	Providence Health & Services
Seattle Reign FC	(England) Laura Harvey	(United States) Keelin Winters	Microsoft
Sky Blue FC	(Northern Ireland) Christy Holly	(United States) Christie Rampone	Meridian Health
Washington Spirit	(United States) Jim Gabarra	(United States) Ali Krieger	ProChain Solutions, Inc.
Western New York Flash	(England) Paul Riley	(New Zealand) Abby Erceg	Sahlen's

== Competition format ==
- Each team will play a total of 20 games, 10 home and 10 away.
- Each team will play all opponents twice, once home and once away, plus one local rival two extra times, also once home and away.
- The four teams at the end of the season with the most points will qualify for the playoffs.

=== Results table ===
Abbreviation and Color Key: Boston Breakers – BOS • Chicago Red Stars – CHI • Houston Dash – HOU • FC Kansas City – KC • Orlando Pride – ORL Portland Thorns FC – POR • Seattle Reign FC – SEA • Sky Blue FC – NJ • Washington Spirit – WAS • Western New York Flash – WNY Win • Loss • Tie • Home Game
Club	Match																			
Club	1	2	3	4	5	6	7	8	9	10	11	12	13	14	15	16	17	18	19	20
Boston Breakers	WAS	SEA	POR	CHI	NJ	KC	WNY	WAS	CHI	WNY	SEA	ORL	NJ	ORL	KC	HOU	POR	WNY	HOU	WNY
Boston Breakers	1–0	0–3	0–1	0–1	1–0	1–0	4–0	1–1	3–0	7–1	2–0	2–1	2–3	1–0	0–2	1–3	5–1	2–2	4–1	0–4
Chicago Red Stars	HOU	WNY	ORL	BOS	KC	SEA	NJ	POR	BOS	POR	WNY	WAS	ORL	HOU	KC	NJ	SEA	KC	KC	WAS
Chicago Red Stars	3–1	1–0	1–0	0–1	0–0	1–2	1–1	1–1	3–0	2–0	2–0	2–0	0–1	1–1	1–0	1–3	2–2	2–3	0–0	3–1
Houston Dash	CHI	ORL	NJ	KC	WAS	ORL	SEA	KC	ORL	NJ	POR	CHI	WNY	WAS	WNY	BOS	ORL	POR	BOS	SEA
Houston Dash	3–1	3–1	0–0	1–2	1–0	0–1	1–0	0–1	0–1	1–0	3–0	1–1	3–3	1–2	2–2	1–3	4–2	3–0	4–1	2–3
FC Kansas City	WNY	POR	SEA	HOU	CHI	BOS	ORL	NJ	HOU	SEA	WAS	POR	WAS	WNY	CHI	BOS	NJ	CHI	CHI	ORL
FC Kansas City	0–1	1–1	1–0	1–2	0–0	1–0	2–0	1–1	0–1	0–0	2–0	1–2	2–3	0–1	1–0	0–2	2–1	2–3	0–0	1–2
Orlando Pride	POR	HOU	CHI	SEA	WNY	HOU	KC	WNY	WAS	HOU	POR	BOS	CHI	SEA	BOS	WAS	HOU	NJ	NJ	KC
Orlando Pride	2–1	3–1	1–0	2–0	1–0	0–1	2–0	1–0	2–0	1–0	1–2	2–1	0–1	5–2	1–0	1–2	4–2	1–1	1–2	1–2
Portland Thorns FC	ORL	KC	BOS	WAS	SEA	WAS	SEA	CHI	WNY	CHI	ORL	NJ	KC	HOU	SEA	SEA	BOS	HOU	WNY	NJ
Portland Thorns FC	2–1	1–1	0–1	0–0	1–1	4–1	0–0	1–1	0–2	2–0	1–2	2–1	1–2	3–0	1–0	3–1	5–1	3–0	3–2	1–3
Seattle Reign FC	NJ	BOS	KC	ORL	POR	CHI	POR	HOU	NJ	KC	BOS	WNY	WNY	ORL	POR	POR	CHI	WAS	WAS	HOU
Seattle Reign FC	1–2	0–3	1–0	2–0	1–1	1–2	0–0	1–0	0–0	0–0	2–0	3–2	1–1	5–2	1–0	3–1	2–2	2–1	2–0	2–3
Sky Blue FC	SEA	WAS	HOU	WNY	BOS	WNY	CHI	KC	SEA	WAS	POR	HOU	BOS	WAS	WAS	CHI	KC	ORL	ORL	POR
Sky Blue FC	1–2	1–2	0–0	1–2	1–0	5–2	1–1	1–1	0–0	1–2	2–1	1–0	2–3	1–0	3–1	1–3	2–1	1–1	1–2	1–3
Washington Spirit	BOS	NJ	WNY	POR	HOU	POR	BOS	ORL	NJ	KC	CHI	KC	NJ	NJ	HOU	ORL	WNY	SEA	SEA	CHI
Washington Spirit	1–0	1–2	0–3	0–0	1–0	4–1	1–1	2–0	1–2	2–0	2–0	2–3	1–0	3–1	1–2	1–2	1–1	2–1	2–0	3–1
Western New York Flash	KC	CHI	WAS	NJ	ORL	NJ	BOS	ORL	POR	BOS	CHI	SEA	SEA	KC	HOU	HOU	WAS	BOS	POR	BOS
Western New York Flash	0–1	1–0	0–3	1–2	1–0	5–2	4–0	1–0	0–2	7–1	2–0	3–2	1–1	0–1	3–3	2–2	1–1	2–2	3–2	0–4

Updated to games played on September 25, 2016.

Scores listed as home-away

== League standings ==
Pos	Team	Pld	W	D	L	GF	GA	GD	Pts	Qualification
1	Portland Thorns FC	20	12	5	3	35	19	+16	41	NWSL Shield
2	Washington Spirit	20	12	3	5	30	21	+9	39	NWSL Playoffs
3	Chicago Red Stars	20	9	6	5	24	20	+4	33	NWSL Playoffs
4	Western New York Flash (C)	20	9	5	6	40	26	+14	32	NWSL Playoffs
5	Seattle Reign FC	20	8	6	6	29	21	+8	30	
6	FC Kansas City	20	7	5	8	18	20	−2	26	
7	Sky Blue FC	20	7	5	8	24	30	−6	26	
8	Houston Dash	20	6	4	10	29	29	0	22	
9	Orlando Pride	20	6	1	13	20	30	−10	19	
10	Boston Breakers	20	3	2	15	14	47	−33	11	

Source: NWSL
Rules for classification: Tiebreakers
(C) Champions

=== Tiebreakers ===
The initial determining factor for a team's position in the standings is most points earned, with three points earned for a win, one point for a draw, and zero points for a loss. If two or more teams tie in point total, when determining rank and playoff qualification and seeding, the NWSL uses the following tiebreaker rules, going down the list until all teams are ranked.

1. Head-to-head win–loss record between the teams (or points-per-game if more than two teams).
2. Greater goal difference across the entire season (against all teams, not just tied teams).
3. Greatest total number of goals scored (against all teams).
4. Apply #1–3 to games played on the road.
5. Apply #1–3 to games played at home.
6. If teams are still equal, ranking will be determined by a coin toss.

NOTE: If two clubs remain tied after another club with the same number of points advances during any step, the tie breaker reverts to step 1 of the two-club format.

=== Weekly live standings ===
Considering each week to end on a Sunday. The number of games played by the teams are uneven due to a weather postponement in week 7 (rescheduled as the only game between week 15 and 16) and differing schedules between week 10 and 16.

Week →	1	2	3	4	5	6	7	8	9	10	11	12	13	14	15	7R	16	17	18	19
Team ↓																				
Portland Thorns FC	3	2	2	3	3	3	2	3	2	1	1	1	1	1	1	2	2	2	2	1
Washington Spirit	5	1	1	1	1	1	3	4	3	4	3	3	2	2	2	1	1	1	1	2
Chicago Red Stars	10	8	4	2	2	2	1	1	1	2	4	4	4	5	4	4	3	3	3	3
Western New York Flash	4	7	8	7	8	5	5	2	4	3	2	2	3	3	3	3	4	4	4	4
Seattle Reign FC	6	3	3	6	7	6	7	6	6	7	5	7	7	6	6	6	5	5	5	5
FC Kansas City	8	9	9	9	9	10	9	9	8	8	8	8	8	8	8	8	8	8	7	6
Sky Blue FC	2	6	6	8	5	8	6	7	7	6	7	6	5	4	5	5	6	6	6	7
Houston Dash	1	5	5	4	6	7	8	8	9	9	9	9	9	9	9	9	9	7	8	8
Orlando Pride	7	4	7	5	4	4	4	5	5	5	6	5	6	7	7	7	7	9	9	9
Boston Breakers	9	10	10	10	10	9	10	10	10	10	10	10	10	10	10	10	10	10	10	10

== Attendance ==
=== Average home attendances ===
Ranked from highest to lowest average attendance.

Team	GP	Attendance	High	Low	Average
Portland Thorns FC	10	169,449	21,144	13,752	16,945
Orlando Pride	10	87,851	23,403	5,842	8,785
Houston Dash	10	56,963	7,440	4,570	5,696
Seattle Reign FC	10	46,018	5,888	3,987	4,602
Western New York Flash	10	38,683	6,449	2,235	3,868
Washington Spirit	10	37,817	5,750	3,036	3,782
Boston Breakers	10	35,704	4,379	1,435	3,570
FC Kansas City	10	31,624	8,022	2,217	3,162
Chicago Red Stars	10	30,045	4,024	2,068	3,005
Sky Blue FC	10	21,621	3,780	1,252	2,162
Total	100	555,775	23,403	1,252	5,558

Updated to games played on September 25, 2016.

=== Highest attendances ===
Regular season

Rank	Home team	Score	Away team	Attendance	Date	Stadium
1	Orlando Pride	3–1	Houston Dash	23,403	April 23, 2016	Camping World Stadium
2	Portland Thorns FC	3–2	Western New York Flash	21,144	September 11, 2016	Providence Park
3	Portland Thorns FC	1–0	Seattle Reign	19,231	July 30, 2016	Providence Park
4	Portland Thorns FC	0–0	Seattle Reign	18,114	May 29, 2016	Providence Park
5	Portland Thorns FC	5–1	Boston Breakers	17,152	September 4, 2016	Providence Park
6	Portland Thorns FC	1–2	FC Kansas City	16,942	July 9, 2016	Providence Park
7	Portland Thorns FC	2–0	Chicago Red Stars	16,931	June 22, 2016	Providence Park
8	Portland Thorns FC	2–1	Orlando Pride	16,073	April 17, 2016	Providence Park
9	Portland Thorns FC	4–1	Washington Spirit	15,823	May 21, 2016	Providence Park
10	Portland Thorns FC	2–0	Sky Blue	14,287	July 2, 2016	Providence Park

Updated to games played on September 25, 2016.

== Statistical leaders ==
=== Top scorers ===
Rank	Player	Club	Goals
1	(United States) Kealia Ohai	Houston Dash	11
1	(United States) Lynn Williams	Western New York Flash	11
3	(United States) Jessica McDonald	Western New York Flash	10
4	(Denmark) Nadia Nadim	Portland Thorns FC	9
5	(United States) Shea Groom	FC Kansas City	8
5	(United States) Christen Press	Chicago Red Stars	8
7	(United States) Sofia Huerta	Chicago Red Stars	7
7	(Netherlands) Manon Melis	Seattle Reign FC	7
9	(United States) Kristen Edmonds	Orlando Pride	6
9	(Scotland) Kim Little	Seattle Reign FC	6
9	(United States) Allie Long	Portland Thorns FC	6
9	(Canada) Christine Sinclair	Portland Thorns FC	6

Updated: September 25

=== Top assists ===
Rank	Player	Club	Assists
1	(United States) Tobin Heath	Portland Thorns FC	10
2	(United States) Jessica McDonald	Western New York Flash	7
2	(United States) Vanessa DiBernardo	Chicago Red Stars	7
4	(United States) Crystal Dunn	Washington Spirit	5
4	(United States) Lynn Williams	Western New York Flash	5
6	(England) Rachel Daly	Houston Dash	4
6	(United States) Makenzy Doniak	Western New York Flash	4
6	(Wales) Jessica Fishlock	Seattle Reign FC	4
6	(England) Leah Galton	Sky Blue FC	4
6	(United States) Taylor Lytle	Sky Blue FC	4
6	(United States) Tiffany McCarty	FC Kansas City	4
6	(United States) Kealia Ohai	Houston Dash	4

Updated: September 25

=== Clean sheets ===
Rank	Player	Club	Clean sheets
1	(United States) Nicole Barnhart	FC Kansas City	6
1	(United States) Alyssa Naeher	Chicago Red Stars	6
3	(Canada) Stephanie Labbé	Washington Spirit	5
3	(United States) Hope Solo	Seattle Reign FC	5
5	(United States) Michelle Betos	Portland Thorns FC	4
5	(United States) Ashlyn Harris	Orlando Pride	4
7	(United States) Adrianna Franch	Portland Thorns FC	3
7	(United States) Caroline Stanley	Sky Blue FC	3
7	(United States) Haley Kopmeyer	Seattle Reign FC	3

Updated: September 25

== NWSL Playoffs ==
The top four teams from the regular season will compete for the NWSL Championship.

Semi-finals
1	Portland Thorns FC	3
4	Western New York Flash (a.e.t.)	4
2	Washington Spirit (a.e.t.)	2
3	Chicago Red Stars	1

Championship
4	Western New York Flash (pen.)	2 (3)
2	Washington Spirit	2 (2)

=== Semi-finals ===
September 30, 2016
8:00pm (EDT)

Washington Spirit	2–1 (a.e.t.)	Chicago Red Stars
Krieger 36'; Nairn (yellow card) 57'; Ordega 111'	Report	Press 81'; Johnson (yellow card) 120+2'

Maryland SoccerPlex
Boyds, Maryland
Attendance: 4,249
Referee: Danielle Chesky
October 2, 2016
2:00pm (PDT)

Portland Thorns FC	3–4 (a.e.t.)	Western New York Flash
Sinclair 39'; Brynjarsdóttir (yellow card) 75'; Sonnett 78'; Horan 105+1'; Heath (yellow card) 114'	Report	Mewis 16'; Kennedy (yellow card) 28'; Doniak 38'; Dahlkemper (yellow card) 76'; Williams 98', 104'; Eddy (yellow card) 109'; D'Angelo (yellow card) 120+1'

Providence Park
Portland, Oregon
Attendance: 20,086
Referee: Marco Vega

=== Championship ===
October 9, 2016
4:00pm (CDT)

Washington Spirit	2–2 (a.e.t.)	Western New York Flash
Dunn 9', 91'; Wys (yellow card) 120+2'	Report	Mewis 14'; Zerboni (yellow card) 84'; Williams 120+4'
Penalties
Krieger (penalty missed); Nairn (penalty scored); Stengel (penalty scored); Huster (penalty missed); Matheson (penalty missed)	2–3	(penalty scored) Dahlkemper; (penalty scored) Hinkle; (penalty missed) McDonald; (penalty scored) Williams; (penalty missed) Mewis

BBVA Compass Stadium
Houston, Texas
Attendance: 8,255
Referee: Matthew Franz

== Individual awards ==
=== Monthly awards ===
Month	Player of the Month		Club	Month's Statline
April	(United States)	Tobin Heath	Portland Thorns FC	3 assists in 2 games; Thorns 1-0-1 in April
May	(United States)	Alyssa Naeher	Chicago Red Stars	3 shutouts, 1 goal allowed in 4 games; Red Stars 3-0-2 in May
June	(Canada)	Christine Sinclair	Portland Thorns FC	3 goals and 1 assist; Thorns 3-0-1 in June
July	(Argentina)	Estefania Banini	Washington Spirit	4 goals; Spirit 4-1-0 in July
August/Olympics	(Canada)	Christine Sinclair	Portland Thorns FC	Both as "Olympian of the Month" and "Player of the Olympics"
September	(United States)	Allie Long	Portland Thorns FC	5 goals in 4 games; Thorns 4-0-0 in September

=== Weekly awards ===
Week	NWSL Player of the Week		NWSL Goal of the Week		NWSL Save of the Week	
Week	Player	Club	Player	Club	Player	Club
1	(England) Rachel Daly	Houston Dash	(Australia) Steph Catley	Orlando Pride	(United States) Michelle Betos	Portland Thorns FC
2	(Scotland) Kim Little	Seattle Reign FC	(United States) Ali Krieger	Washington Spirit	(United States) Ashlyn Harris	Orlando Pride
3	(Scotland) Kim Little	Seattle Reign FC	(United States) Christen Press	Chicago Red Stars	(United States) Ashlyn Harris	Orlando Pride
4	(United States) Chioma Ubogagu	Houston Dash	(United States) Christen Press	Chicago Red Stars	(United States) Ashlyn Harris	Orlando Pride
5	(United States) Alyssa Naeher	Chicago Red Stars	(United States) Alex Morgan	Orlando Pride	(Australia) Lydia Williams	Houston Dash
6	(United States) Tobin Heath	Portland Thorns FC	(United States) Tobin Heath	Portland Thorns FC	(United States) Ashlyn Harris	Orlando Pride
7	(United States) Lynn Williams	Western New York Flash	(United States) Erika Tymrak	FC Kansas City	(United States) Katherine Reynolds	Portland Thorns FC
8	(United States) Britt Eckerstrom	Western New York Flash	(United States) Christen Press	Chicago Red Stars	(United States) Ashlyn Harris	Orlando Pride
9	(Mexico) Sofia Huerta	Chicago Red Stars	(United States) Becky Sauerbrunn	FC Kansas City	(United States) Ashlyn Harris	Orlando Pride
10	(United States) Jessica McDonald	Western New York Flash	(United States) Jasmyne Spencer	Orlando Pride	(United States) Ashlyn Harris	Orlando Pride
11	(Japan) Nahomi Kawasumi	Seattle Reign	(Iceland) Dagný Brynjarsdóttir	Portland Thorns FC	(United States) Nicole Barnhart	FC Kansas City
12	(United States) Kristen Edmonds	Orlando Pride	(United States) Kristen Edmonds	Orlando Pride	(United States) Michelle Betos	Portland Thorns FC
13	(Argentina) Estefania Banini	Washington Spirit	(Argentina) Estefania Banini	Washington Spirit	(United States) Michelle Betos	Portland Thorns FC
14	(United States) Nicole Barnhart	FC Kansas City	(England) Rachel Daly	Houston Dash	(United States) Kendall Fletcher	Seattle Reign FC
15	(United States) Kealia Ohai	Houston Dash	(England) Rachel Daly	Houston Dash	(United States) Michelle Betos	Portland Thorns FC
16	(Netherlands) Manon Melis	Seattle Reign FC	(United States) Christine Nairn	Washington Spirit	(United States) Alyssa Naeher	Chicago Red Stars
17	(United States) Kealia Ohai	Houston Dash	(United States) Alex Morgan	Orlando Pride	(United States) Alyssa Naeher	Chicago Red Stars
18	(Australia) Samantha Kerr	Sky Blue FC	(United States) Christen Press	Chicago Red Stars	(United States) Ashlyn Harris	Orlando Pride
19	(United States) Allie Long	Portland Thorns FC	(United States) Kealia Ohai	Houston Dash	(Australia) Lydia Williams	Houston Dash

=== Annual awards ===
Award	Winner		
Golden Boot	(United States) Lynn Williams	Western New York Flash	11 goals
Rookie of the Year	(Costa Rica) Raquel Rodriguez	Sky Blue FC	1,461 minutes
Goalkeeper of the Year	(United States) Ashlyn Harris	Orlando Pride	1.33 GAA, 62 saves
Defender of the Year	(United States) Lauren Barnes	Seattle Reign FC	531 consecutive SO minutes
Coach of the Year	(England) Mark Parsons	Portland Thorns FC	12–3–5 regular season
Most Valuable Player	(United States) Lynn Williams	Western New York Flash	11 goals, 5 assists

NWSL Best XI
Position	First team			Second team		
Goalkeeper	(United States) Ashlyn Harris	Orlando Pride	62 saves	(United States) Alyssa Naeher	Chicago Red Stars	1.00 GAA
Defender	(United States) Lauren Barnes	Seattle Reign FC	1,775 minutes	(United States) Julie Johnston	Chicago Red Stars	1.00 team GAA
Defender	(United States) Arin Gilliland	Chicago Red Stars	1.00 team GAA	(United States) Ali Krieger	Washington Spirit	1.05 team GAA
Defender	(United States) Emily Menges	Portland Thorns FC	0.95 team GAA	(United States) Christie Rampone	Sky Blue FC	1,800 minutes
Defender	(United States) Becky Sauerbrunn	FC Kansas City	1.00 team GAA	(United States) Casey Short	Chicago Red Stars	1,781 minutes
Midfielder	(United States) Tobin Heath	Portland Thorns FC	Goal, 10 assists	(United States) Danielle Colaprico	Chicago Red Stars	Goal, 2 assists
Midfielder	(United States) Allie Long	Portland Thorns FC	6 goals, 2 assists	(United States) Vanessa DiBernardo	Chicago Red Stars	7 assists
FW // MF	(United States) Jessica McDonald	Western New York Flash	10 goals, 7 assists	(Wales) Jess Fishlock	Seattle Reign FC	Goal, 4 assists
FW // MF	(United States) Kealia Ohai	Houston Dash	11 goals, 4 assists	(Scotland) Kim Little	Seattle Reign FC	6 goals, 2 assists
Forward	(United States) Christen Press	Chicago Red Stars	8 goals	(United States) Crystal Dunn	Washington Spirit	2 goals, 5 assists
Forward	(United States) Lynn Williams	Western New York Flash	11 goals, 5 assists	(United States) Shea Groom	FC Kansas City	8 goals

NWSL Championship Game MVP
Player	Club	Record
(Canada) Sabrina D'Angelo	Western New York Flash	3 saves in PK shootout
