= NWSL Draft =

Annual entry draft for the National Women's Soccer League

The NWSL Draft was an annual entry draft for the National Women's Soccer League (NWSL) which took place in December or January of each year. Prior to 2021 it was known as the NWSL College Draft, and was renamed to reflect that selections were no longer limited to collegiate players.

Unlike other nations' leagues, which often use an academy model or free agency to allow players to solicit contract offers and choose which team they play for, the NWSL restricted player entry and distributed players to teams through a variety of mechanisms, including the NWSL Draft for players ages 18 and older with active or potential NCAA eligibility. This was driven in part by NCAA amateurism rules and the breadth of NCAA Division I women's soccer in the United States, both unique factors not replicated in other nations.

On August 22, 2024, the NWSL announced the elimination of its draft and discovery systems as part of its renegotiated collective bargaining agreement with the National Women's Soccer League Players Association. NWSL teams could pursue and sign any prospective collegiate and international players as free agents, bringing the league closer in line with global standards within the sport.

== History ==
The first NWSL Draft was announced on December 21, 2012, and held on January 18, 2013, at the NSCAA Convention in Indianapolis, Indiana, a few months prior to the start of the league's inaugural season on April 13, 2013, and one day after the 2013 MLS SuperDraft in the same venue.

Chicago Red Stars selected Zakiya Bywaters with the first overall pick in the inaugural draft.

== Venue ==
Most NWSL Draft events took place at the annual United Soccer Coaches Convention, previously called the NSCAA Convention, which changes venue each year. The 2021 NWSL Draft held via videoconference, and 2022 NWSL Draft hosted remotely by CBS Sports, were the sole exceptions due to the COVID-19 pandemic.

=== Broadcast ===
CBS Sports Network and Paramount+ broadcast and streamed the NWSL Draft, respectively, from 2022 to 2024. Previous editions of the draft streamed on Twitch, the NWSL website, Facebook, and YouTube.

== Eligibility ==
With the exception of the 2021 NWSL Draft, players had to register to be selected in the NWSL Draft. As of November 2022, the league defined an eligible player as one who is:

- At least 18 years old as of January 1 of the draft year
- Either a United States citizen or permanent resident, or be a foreign player who was enrolled at a United States university at the time of draft registration or the immediate preceding academic year
  - Since 2021, United States citizens or permanent residents do not need to be enrolled in college to be eligible for selection. This was first exercised by Angel City FC, who selected high-school player Alyssa Thompson with the first overall selection in the 2023 NWSL Draft.
- Without any remaining collegiate eligibility, such as their NCAA eligibility, whether by exhausting, losing, or renouncing it
- Without any professional contract to play soccer, and also has not previously had a professional contract to play soccer
- Registered for the draft prior to the deadline provided by the league when it opens registration

If a collegiate player was eligible to register for the draft but declined to do so, NWSL teams cannot make a discovery claim on that player until after the completion of the following season.

If an eligible player registered but withdrew prior to the draft, they could register for a future NWSL Draft. If an eligible player registered and was not selected, the league made them available to teams via discovery. An undrafted player could choose to retain any remaining collegiate eligibility within 72 hours of the draft, but couldn't enter the league via a future NWSL Draft.

=== 2021 NWSL Draft ===
Due to the disruption of college soccer and resulting 2021 NCAA Division I spring season, the NWSL applied for and received a waiver from the NCAA so that Division I players who were drafted could choose to report immediately for the 2021 NWSL season and forfeit their remaining collegiate eligibility, or remain with their collegiate teams until the conclusion of the NCAA Division I spring season in May 2021.

The NWSL waived registration requirements so that all Division I players who had exhausted three years of collegiate soccer eligibility prior to the 2020–21 academic year were automatically eligible to be drafted.

The NWSL playing rights of drafted players were held until the start of the 2022 preseason rather than the end of the 2021 season as was the case previously.

== Structure ==
=== Draft selections as assets ===
The NWSL uses a system of assigning teams the right to sign new players to an NWSL contract. As of 2023, only players with certain tenure within the league are eligible for free agency and can choose which team they can sign a contract with.

A team that makes a draft selection acquires the NWSL-exclusive right to sign the selected player for time-limited basis, which the league calls "draft rights". Draft rights can be waived, allowing other NWSL teams to make a discovery claim, or traded to other NWSL teams. However, the selection does not automatically offer the player a contract, nor does it obligate the player to sign with the team nor to play in the NWSL. Draft rights prohibit the selected player only from signing with any other NWSL team. Multiple players have been selected in NWSL drafts but opted to play in other leagues.

The selecting team must invite the player to preseason, and has 60 days from the date the player reports to either offer the player a contract, or trade or waive the player's NWSL playing rights. If the team offers the selected player a contract, the team retains the right to sign that player until either January 30 of the third year following the draft in which they were selected, or until the offered contract's terms would have expired, whichever comes first. Domestic draft selections can be signed outside of transfer windows, but international players might be subject to transfer window and work permit restrictions.

A team's position in the draft is also considered a team asset and can be traded with other NWSL teams for any combination of other assets, including picks in the current or next three NWSL Drafts, for NWSL players already under contract to other teams, for NWSL-specific rights to players not under contract, for allocation money in the current or next three seasons, or for international slots. Trades can also be conditional, and the league determines the results of all conditions between the day after the prior season's championship match and before the following NWSL Draft. The league must approve all trades.

=== Draft order ===
The draft is composed of four rounds in which each club has one natural selection. As of 2023, the league had 12 teams, resulting in 48 total selections. The selection order is determined in reverse order of the teams' positions on the league table at the end of the previous regular season, with the last-placed team selecting first. If teams were tied, the league follows tie-breaking procedures. The two teams that played in the NWSL championship are exceptions; the runners up select second-to-last, and the champions select last, regardless of their positions on the regular season table.

In seasons where the league has added new teams, those expansion teams select first. Selections in an expansion draft can generate compensatory picks in an NWSL Draft for the team losing players.

A team found to have tampered with a player or staff member of another team might be required to forfeit or defer draft selections as punishment.

==== 2013 NWSL College Draft ====
The only NWSL Draft to use a different ordering mechanism was its inaugural draft. With no prior season's results to use, the league applied a weighted draw based on NWSL federation allocation strength as determined by a panel. Subsequent rounds used a "snake" order, with the order of the second round reversed from the first round.

=== Limitations ===
Due to the nature of NWSL roster rules, when a team selects a player in the draft, the team acquires only the right to offer a player an NWSL contract, with exclusivity limited to within the NWSL and for a limited period of time. A drafted player that does not intend to play in the NWSL is not obligated to report to or remain with the team, but drafted players are prohibited from signing with other NWSL teams by the league's lack of free agency for new entrants to the league. Notable examples of players who registered for and were selected in an NWSL draft but declined to report and instead signed for teams in other leagues include Mia Fishel and Julia Ashley.

== Criticism ==
A league that is able to control players' rights without their consent does not align with football on a global scale.

— Deyna Castellanos, Twitter

Players who played collegiate soccer in the United States have publicly criticized the lack of free agency in the NWSL. In 2021, United States national team player and former NWSL player Heather O'Reilly called for the end of the draft and unrestricted free agency for players. Deyna Castellanos, who played for Florida State but declined to register for the 2020 NWSL College Draft and instead signed with Atlético Madrid of Spain's Liga F, stated in November 2019 that NWSL rules "do not favor international talent." She again stated her desire on July 6, 2022, for the NWSL to provide players with "full autonomy of their careers." At the 2023 NWSL Draft, NWSL Players Association executive director Meghann Burke suggested the league would have to adopt unrestricted free agency to remain globally competitive.

In response to criticism and increased competitive pressure from European leagues with free agency, the NWSL in 2023 hired Tatjana Haenni, who previously led women's soccer for FIFA and UEFA, and NWSL commissioner Jessica Berman stated that Haenni would have influence over the draft's future direction.

The 2024 CBA not only abolished the draft, but also removed all restrictions on player movement for players not under contract.

== List of NWSL Drafts ==
| Year | Date | Rounds | Picks | Location | First selection | Team |
|---|---|---|---|---|---|---|
| 2013 | January 18, 2013 | 4 | 32 | Indianapolis, IN | (United States) Zakiya Bywaters | Chicago Red Stars |
| 2014 | January 17, 2014 | 4 | 36 | Philadelphia, PA | (United States) Crystal Dunn | Washington Spirit |
| 2015 | January 16, 2015 | 4 | 36 | Philadelphia, PA | (United States) Morgan Brian | Houston Dash |
| 2016 | January 15, 2016 | 4 | 40 | Baltimore, MD | (United States) Emily Sonnett | Portland Thorns FC |
| 2017 | January 12, 2017 | 4 | 40 | Los Angeles, CA | (United States) Rose Lavelle | Boston Breakers |
| 2018 | January 18, 2018 | 4 | 40 | Philadelphia, PA | (United States) Andi Sullivan | Washington Spirit |
| 2019 | January 10, 2019 | 4 | 36 | Chicago, IL | (United States) Tierna Davidson | Chicago Red Stars |
| 2020 | January 16, 2020 | 4 | 36 | Baltimore, MD | (United States) Sophia Smith | Portland Thorns FC |
| 2021 | January 13, 2021 | 4 | 40 | via videoconference | (United States) Emily Fox | Racing Louisville FC |
| 2022 | December 18, 2021 | 4 | 50 | via videoconference | (United States) Naomi Girma | San Diego Wave FC |
| 2023 | January 12, 2023 | 4 | 48 | Philadelphia, PA | (United States) Alyssa Thompson | Angel City FC |
| 2024 | January 12, 2024 | 4 | 56 | Anaheim, CA | (United States) Ally Sentnor | Utah Royals FC |

== Other entry mechanisms ==
=== Under-18 entry ===
Prior to the 2021 NWSL season, the NWSL prohibited players under the age of 18 from entering the league. On July 30, 2021, 15-year-old Olivia Moultrie and NWSL club Portland Thorns FC settled an antitrust lawsuit they filed against the league to allow her to play. The settlement was limited in scope to Moultrie, but the league subsequently created an ad-hoc system for individually approving clubs' requests to sign minors as players. The first application of this case-by-case policy was the signing of Jaedyn Shaw, for which the league used its existing discovery process.

The 2023 NWSL season introduced a formal entry list process for players under the age of 18, which established requirements and limitations on such signings. Teams are limited to two under-18 players, must keep the player under contract until they turn 18, can't waive or trade the player until they turn 18 or have consent from both the player and their parent or guardian, cannot be selected in an expansion draft, must live with a parent or guardian until they turn 18, and must be citizens or permanent residents of the United States. Under-18 entry list slots aren't team assets and can't be traded.

=== Discovery ===
The NWSL has a system of discovery in which teams can acquire the right to sign players not under an NWSL contract, whose rights to sign an NWSL contract are not controlled by an NWSL team, and who are at least 17 years old, not eligible for an NWSL Draft, and not part of the United States women's national soccer team player pool. Teams can use the discovery process to acquire the rights to draft-eligible players who registered but weren't selected. NWSL teams can also acquire via discovery the right to sign players from other leagues, including transfers from other leagues, with limits on the claim's length and the potential for competing requests by multiple teams for the right to sign the same player. Players selected via discovery aren't obligated to sign with the NWSL team that selected them, and the league can void a discovery claim if the team fails to act upon it. However, if the selecting team makes a bona fide contract offer to the player, then the NWSL prohibits any other team from making a discovery claim on that player for the rest of the season. This has prevented players in other leagues, such as Elise Kellond-Knight, from signing with an NWSL team due to a conflicting discovery claim by a team they didn't want to play for.

=== Waiver wire ===
NWSL teams can waive their right to sign a player, including their rights to a draft selection. Waived players enter the league's waiver wire, where teams can choose to acquire the player's NWSL rights and take on their contract if signed to one, similar to a free transfer but without a direct transaction between teams. The waiver wire also has a specific selection order, using the same logic as the draft order, and at the end of an NWSL season also includes players whose contracts have expired.

=== Unattached subsidized individual distribution order ===
At the 2016 NWSL College Draft, the league announced the addition of a new entry process for NWSL federation players who otherwise weren't eligible for the NWSL Draft or other entry mechanisms. This was initially expected to facilitate the entry of Mallory Pugh, then 17 years old and had not yet reported to UCLA, to an NWSL team. Pugh was designated an "unattached subsidized individual" who would enter through a distribution ranking order, using the same logic as the NWSL college draft order, with teams able to trade ranking order as assets. However, Pugh instead reported to UCLA, then in May 2017 relinquished her collegiate eligibility and entered the league via distribution after the order had reset. Washington Spirit had the first selection in the order, acquired via trade with the Boston Breakers, who finished the 2016 NWSL season in last place.

== See also ==
- Draft (sports)
