= Meghann Burke =

American professional soccer goalkeeper

Personal information
- Full name: Meghann Kay Burke
- Date of birth: October 11, 1980 (age 46)
- Place of birth: St. Louis, Missouri, U.S.
- Height: 5 ft 9 in (1.75 m)
- Position: Goalkeeper

College career
Years	Team	Apps	(Gls)
1999–2002	Saint Louis Billikens		

Senior career*
Years	Team	Apps	(Gls)
2000	Fort Collins Force		
2001–2002	Memphis Mercury		
2003	Carolina Courage		
2004	Asheville Splash		
2004–2005	Bristol Rovers		
2006–2007	River Cities Futbol Club		
2008	Boston Renegades	14	(0)
2010	Chicago Red Stars	0	(0)
2010	Sky Blue FC	4	(0)
2018	Asheville City SC	1	(0)
- * Club domestic league appearances and goals

Meghann Kay Burke (born October 11, 1980) is an attorney and executive director of the National Women's Soccer League Players Association (NWSLPA), the trade union for players in the NWSL, the top division of women's soccer in the United States. Burke led the NWSLPA to its first collective bargaining agreement in 2022.

Burke is also a retired soccer player and coach. As a player, Burke was a goalkeeper for teams in Women's Professional Soccer (WPS), and was most recently a player and coach for Women's Premier Soccer League club Asheville City SC.

== College career ==
Burke attended Mehlville High School and was named Metro Goalkeeper of the Year in 1998. She was part of the United States U16 team in 1996–97. In four years at Saint Louis University Burke was a first-team starter and was named to various select teams. She also acquired the nickname "the Burkeinator" and was declared the university's Player of the Decade.

== Club career ==
=== Amateur ===
After 2000, Burke featured for a number of W-League and WPSL teams.

She played for Bristol Rovers in 2004–05, helping the English club reach the semi-finals of the FA Women's Cup.

=== Professional ===
After graduating from SLU, Burke was drafted by Carolina Courage of the WUSA. She returned to the professional ranks as a development player with Chicago Red Stars of Women's Professional Soccer (WPS) in 2010 before joining Sky Blue FC as a free agent in August 2010.

== Legal career ==
Burke studied labor law while playing in WPS. She graduated with a juris doctor from the Northeastern University School of Law.

=== WPS Players Union ===
In 2010 while still playing in WPS, Burke helped organize the WPS Players Union to represent players under the league's new ownership structure.

=== Practice ===
Burke worked for the firm of Brazil & Burke in Asheville, North Carolina, as a criminal defense and civil rights attorney from 2011 to 2021.

=== NWSL Players Association ===
The NWSL Players Association (NWSLPA) hired Burke as its general council in May 2017 at the association's founding. Burke had been a teammate of the association's founding executive director Yael Averbuch in 2010 while at Sky Blue FC. The association appointed Burke its chief operating officer in November 2020. On April 1, 2022, the NWSLPA hired Burke as its full-time executive director, replacing Brooke Elby.

In June 2022, AFL-CIO members elected Burke to its executive council as a vice president.

==== Collective bargaining agreement ====
The NWSLPA began negotiations with the NWSL toward its first collective bargaining agreement (CBA) in March 2021.

The union and league ratified the agreement on January 31, 2022, less than a day before players were expected to report to clubs for the 2022 preseason. The agreement provided improvements to player salaries and benefits, facilities, parental and mental health leave, and initial steps toward free agency for long-tenured players. Burke said the association worked with players' unions of other professional sports leagues to help draft the CBA, particularly the Women's National Basketball Players Association, and also worked to make the NWSL CBA public.

==== Free agency arbitration ====
The new CBA provided players with sufficient tenure whose contracts were expiring as of August 26, 2022, the option to begin negotiating with clubs as free agents. However, the league interpreted this provision to exclude players whose contracts had options to extend, even if the club had not determined whether it would exercise the option or notified the player of any decision to extend. The league's interpretation would delay those players' negotiations until November 15, the deadline for clubs to exercise options. The NWSLPA disagreed on behalf of 22 affected players who had expected to begin negotiations in August.

Burke worked with NWSLPA president Tori Huster to dispute the league's interpretation through an independent arbitrator per the CBA's terms, and on October 17, 2022, the arbitrator ruled in favor of the NWSLPA and granted free agency to 22 of the affected players. Burke and NWSL commissioner Jessica Berman both praised the use of the arbitration process, which had been added by the CBA, to resolve the dispute.

==== Abuse investigations ====
In July 2021, Burke warned then-NWSL commissioner Lisa Baird that players would submit a serious complaint against North Carolina Courage head coach Paul Riley. A complaint filed with the league in the same month alleged that Riley was inappropriately discussing players' weight and required a player to send him details about her weight daily for two months.

In September 2021, The Athletic published a report detailing accusations of sexual abuse of players and misconduct by Riley spanning years and across the NWSL and WPS. It also reported that the NWSL had disregarded players who reported the issues in 2015. Burke spoke again with Baird about the report before Baird resigned on October 1, 2021. On October 26, 2021, Burke suggested that Baird's resignation did not address the systemic issues that led to the alleged abuse.

Burke worked with the NWSL to launch a joint league-wide investigation into reports of abuse and misconduct. The league and association each hired law firms to serve as independent investigators. The joint investigation reported its results in December 2022, which led to the permanent bans of former coaches Riley, Richie Burke, Rory Dames, and Christy Holly, and uncovered several instances of misconduct across many of the league's teams.

In October 2022, Burke was featured in an E:60 documentary, Truth Be Told, about the abuse scandal. In the documentary, she suggested that the league's low professional standards in its early years contributed to the abuse.

== Sports ownership ==
Burke is a co-owner of Asheville City SC and helped to co-found the club's Women's Premier Soccer League side with Stacey Enos and Lydia Vandenbergh.

== Personal life ==
Burke is married to Jasmine Beach-Ferrara, a Buncombe County commissioner and executive director of LGBT advocacy group Campaign for Southern Equality. Burke had served as lead counsel for Campaign for Southern Equality and co-authored the organization's amicus brief to the Supreme Court of the United States in the landmark gay marriage case Obergefell v. Hodges. In 2026, she was a recipient of the Torchbearer "Carrying Change" Awards' Legend Award.
