= List of National Women's Soccer League seasons =

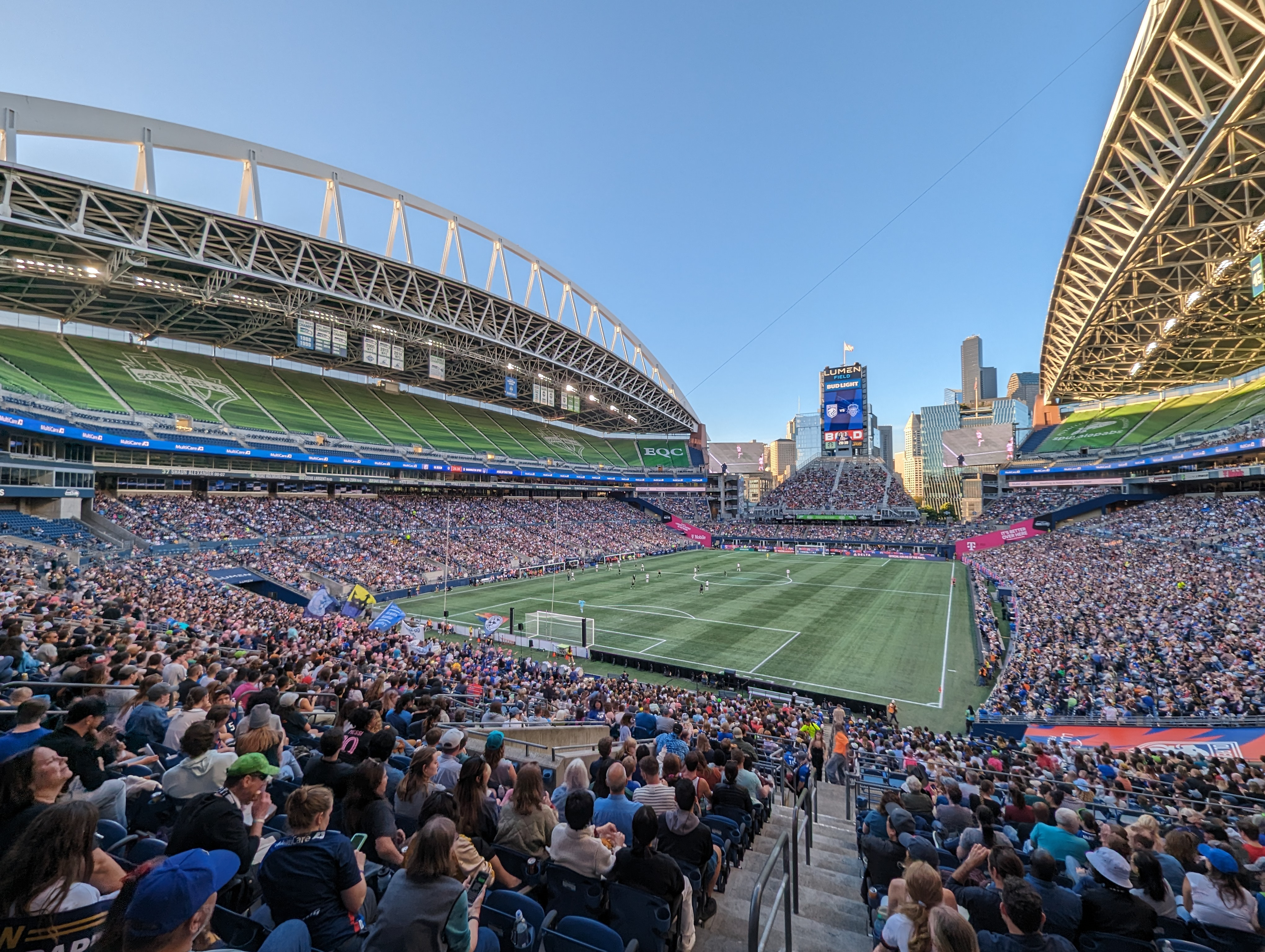
A 2023 regular season match hosted by Seattle Reign FC against the Washington Spirit at Lumen Field in Seattle

The National Women's Soccer League (NWSL) is a top-flight professional women's soccer league in the United States. It shares first-division status with the USL Super League. As of 2026, the league has 16 teams and uses a schedule that runs from spring to fall within a single calendar year. The champion is determined by the NWSL Championship and the playoffs, a postseason knockout tournament for top teams in the regular season similar to those for other North American sports leagues. The team with the best record during the regular season, as determined by the number of points or another tiebreaker, is awarded the NWSL Shield. Several NWSL teams share ownership or their home venues with men's teams in Major League Soccer (MLS) and the USL Championship who play in the same markets. The league had an average attendance of over 10,000 for four seasons since the 2023 regular season and set a record for total attendance of over 2 million spectators in 2024.

The NWSL was founded in November 2012 under the administration of the United States Soccer Federation with eight teams who would begin play the following year. It was the third professional women's soccer league to be established in the United States, following the Women's United Soccer Association from 2001 to 2003 and Women's Professional Soccer, which folded in early 2012 after three seasons. The inaugural season in 2013 was played over a five-month calendar by the eight charter teams; the championship was won by Portland Thorns FC, while the NWSL Shield was awarded to the Western New York Flash—who were playing in their fourth league in four years. The first NWSL expansion team were the Houston Dash in 2014, who were followed two years later by the Orlando Pride. Two of the league's ten teams ceased operations prior to the 2018 season, while another had relocated a year earlier. NWSL added pairs of expansion teams in 2021, 2022, and 2024, including re-entering markets where teams had folded. The league announced plans to grow to 16 teams by 2026 with a set bidding process and fee similar to older North American sports leagues.

As of the 14th season in 2026, each team plays 30 matches during the regular season in a round-robin home-and-away series against the other 15 teams. The regular season runs from March to November and includes a month-long break in June. The break has previously been used for international tournaments, such as the Women's World Cup and Summer Olympics. The top eight teams qualified for the playoffs, which were played over three rounds in November and culminated in the NWSL Championship. Most of the league's matches are broadcast in the U.S. by national television stations and streaming services. The league champions, runners-up, and NWSL Shield winner also qualify for the CONCACAF W Champions Cup, the continental championship for women's teams in North America, Central America, and the Caribbean since 2024. A preseason super cup match, named the NWSL Challenge Cup, is contested by the reigning champions of the NWSL Championship and NWSL Shield; it was originally conceived during the COVID-19 pandemic to replace the cancelled 2020 season and had all NWSL teams from 2020 to 2023. During the 2024 season, NWSL teams also played in the NWSL x Liga MX Femenil Summer Cup, an international competition with six Mexican clubs from Liga MX Femenil.

Portland Thorns FC have won three NWSL Championships, the most of any team in the league's history; the team also has two NWSL Shields. Seattle Reign FC hold the record for most NWSL Shields, at three, and have finished as runners-up in three NWSL Championship games. The "double"—an NWSL Championship and NWSL Shield in the same season—has been won three times: by the North Carolina Courage in 2018 and 2019, and by the Orlando Pride in 2024. The Kansas City Current set the league's all-time points record during the 2025 season, with 65 points and a record of 21 wins, 3 losses, and 2 draws. The league has several annual awards for individual players and coaches to recognize their accomplishments, including the Most Valuable Player Award for the best player of the year and the Golden Boot for the player who scored the most goals during the regular season. The single-season scoring record of 20 goals was set by Malawian forward Temwa Chawinga of the Kansas City Current during the 2024 season; she also won the Most Valuable Player Award.

== List of seasons ==
National Women's Soccer League seasons
Season	Teams	Playoffs			Regular season					Most valuable player	Golden Boot (Note: The Golden Boot column is sorted by number of goals scored, followed by the player's surname.)	Ref.
Season	Teams	Champion	Score	Runners-up	NWSL Shield	Record (Note: The record column is sorted by points per game due to the changes in the number of matches played per season.)	Pts.	MP	Avg. attendance	Most valuable player	Golden Boot	Ref.
2013	8	Portland Thorns FC	2–0	Western New York Flash	Western New York Flash (Note: The Western New York Flash, FC Kansas City, and Portland Thorns FC all finished the regular season with 38 points in a tie for first place. The NWSL Shield was determined by the first tiebreaker, the head-to-head record between tied teams, which Western New York won against Kansas City, who placed second as a result.)	10–4–8	38	22	4,270	Lauren Holiday	Lauren Holiday (12)	
2014	9	FC Kansas City	2–1	Seattle Reign FC	Seattle Reign FC	16–2–6	54	24	4,139	Kim Little	Kim Little (16)	
2015	9	FC Kansas City (2nd title)	1–0	Seattle Reign FC	Seattle Reign FC (2nd title)	13–3–4	43	20	5,046	Crystal Dunn	Crystal Dunn (15)	
2016	10	Western New York Flash	2–2 (3–2 p.)	Washington Spirit	Portland Thorns FC	12–3–5	41	20	5,558	Lynn Williams	Lynn Williams (11)	
2017	10	Portland Thorns FC (2nd title)	1–0	North Carolina Courage	North Carolina Courage (Note: The North Carolina Courage was established in 2017 using the franchise rights it acquired from the Western New York Flash; for statistical purposes, the two teams have separate histories.)	16–7–1	49	24	5,083	Sam Kerr	Sam Kerr (17)	
2018	9	North Carolina Courage	3–0	Portland Thorns FC	North Carolina Courage (2nd title)	17–1–6	57	24	6,024	Lindsey Horan	Sam Kerr (16)	
2019	9	North Carolina Courage (2nd title)	4–0	Chicago Red Stars	North Carolina Courage (3rd title)	15–5–4	49	24	7,386	Sam Kerr (2nd title)	Sam Kerr (18)	
2020	9	Regular season and playoffs cancelled due to the COVID-19 pandemic and replaced by alternative competitions.										
2021	10	Washington Spirit	2–1	Chicago Red Stars	Portland Thorns FC (2nd title)	13–6–5	44	24	5,528 (Note: Some matches during the 2021 season had limited attendance due to capacity limits imposed during the COVID-19 pandemic.)	Jess Fishlock	Ashley Hatch (10)	
2022	12	Portland Thorns FC (3rd title)	2–0	Kansas City Current	OL Reign (3rd title) (Note: Seattle Reign FC was named Reign FC in 2019 and OL Reign from 2020 to 2023.)	11–4–7	40	22	7,894	Sophia Smith	Alex Morgan (15)	
2023	12	NJ/NY Gotham FC	2–1	OL Reign	San Diego Wave FC	11–7–4	37	22	10,638	Sophia Smith (2nd title)	Sophia Smith (11)	
2024	14	Orlando Pride	1–0	Washington Spirit	Orlando Pride	18–2–6	60	26	11,250	Temwa Chawinga	Temwa Chawinga (20)	
2025	14	NJ/NY Gotham FC (2nd title)	1–0	Washington Spirit	Kansas City Current	21–3–2	65	26	10,669	Temwa Chawinga (2nd title)	Temwa Chawinga (15)	
2026	16	Kansas City Current	2–1	Washington Spirit	NJ/NY Gotham FC	18–5–7	61	30	11,003	Ashley Sanchez	Ashley Sanchez (20)	
