= Brooke Elby =

American association football player (born 1993)

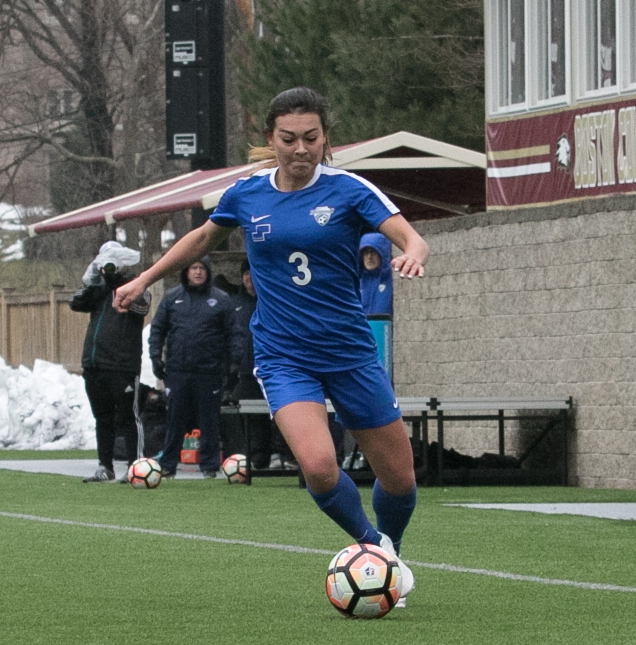
- Brooke Elby playing for the Boston Breakers on March 25, 2017.

Personal information
- Full name: Brooke Kazuko Elby
- Date of birth: May 24, 1993 (age 33)
- Place of birth: Arcadia, California, United States
- Height: 5 ft 4 in (1.63 m)
- Positions: Midfielder; defender

College career
Years	Team	Apps	(Gls)
2011–2014	North Carolina Tar Heels		

Senior career*
Years	Team	Apps	(Gls)
2014	Liverpool F.C. Women	0	(0)
2015–2016	Melbourne Victory	9	(0)
2016–2017	Boston Breakers	26	(0)
2018	Utah Royals FC	7	(0)
2018–2019	Chicago Red Stars	21	(2)
- * Club domestic league appearances and goals as of December 16, 2019

Brooke Kazuko Elby (born May 24, 1993) is an American former soccer midfielder/defender who last played for the Chicago Red Stars in the National Women's Soccer League (NWSL). She was the second executive director of the NWSL Players Association.

== Club career ==
She previously played for the Boston Breakers and Melbourne Victory of the Australian W-League. Elby was a member of the Boston Breakers when they folded in January, 2018. She was selected by the Utah Royals FC in the Boston Breakers Dispersal Draft. On June 18, 2018, Elby was traded to the Chicago Red Stars. On December 16, 2019, Elby announced her retirement from professional soccer.

== NWSL Players Association ==
In 2019, Elby was elected president of the National Women's Soccer League Players Association (NWSLPA), succeeding Yael Averbuch. Following her retirement from professional soccer, Elby assumed the role of co-executive director at the NWSLPA. In April 2021, Meghann Burke succeeded Elby as NWSLPA executive director.
