= Amanda Duffy =

Amanda Duffy may refer to:

- Mandy Lee (singer), née Amanda Duffy
- Amanda Duffy, Mrs. America
- Amanda Duffy (soccer), managing director of operations for the National Women's Soccer League
- Murder of Amanda Duffy
