= 2015 National Women's Soccer League season =

3rd season of the National Women's Soccer League

National Women's Soccer League
- Season: 2015
- Champions: FC Kansas City
- NWSL Shield: Seattle Reign FC
- Matches: 90
- Goals: 251 (2.79 per match)
- Top goalscorer: Crystal Dunn (WAS), 15 goals
- Biggest home win: SEA 5–1 WNY (Apr 12); KC 4–0 WNY (Aug 8)
- Biggest away win: NJ 0–3 CHI (June 28); HOU 0–3 SEA (Aug 22)
- Highest scoring: POR 5–2 BOS (Aug 5)
- Longest winning run: 6 games Seattle Reign FC (July 22 – August 26)
- Longest unbeaten run: 8 games Seattle Reign FC (May 2 – July 11) (July 22 – September 5)
- Longest losing run: 4 games Boston Breakers (July 22 – August 5); Houston Dash (August 1 – August 21)
- Highest attendance: 21,144 @ POR 0–1 SEA (July 22)
- Lowest attendance: 953 @ NJ 1–3 WAS (Apr 26)
- Total attendance: 454,100
- Average attendance: 5,046
- All statistics correct as of September 6, 2015.

The 2015 National Women's Soccer League season was the third season of the National Women's Soccer League, the top division of women's soccer in the United States. Including the NWSL's two professional predecessors, Women's Professional Soccer (2009–2011) and the Women's United Soccer Association (2001–2003), it was the ninth overall season of FIFA and USSF-sanctioned top division women's soccer in the United States. The league was operated by the United States Soccer Federation and received major financial backing from that body. Further financial backing was provided by the Canadian Soccer Association and the Mexican Football Federation. All three national federations paid the league salaries of many of their respective national team members in an effort to nurture talent in those nations.

In January, Jeff Plush was named NWSL commissioner, replacing Cheryl Bailey.

To accommodate the 2015 FIFA Women's World Cup, the league announced it would take a two-week break from June 7–19, reduce the season to 20 games, and extend the playing calendar into September.

For the second straight season, FC Kansas City defeated the NWSL Shield winners Seattle Reign FC 1–0 to win the NWSL championship.

== Teams, stadiums, and personnel ==
=== Stadiums and locations ===
Two teams, the Dash and Reign, do not make their stadiums' entire capacity available for home games, instead restricting ticket sales at a lower level. The full capacities of their venues are included in parentheses and italics.

Team	Stadium	Capacity
Boston Breakers	Soldiers Field Soccer Stadium	4,500
Chicago Red Stars	Village Sports Complex	3,600
Houston Dash	BBVA Compass Stadium	7,000 (22,039)
FC Kansas City	Swope Soccer Village	4,000
Portland Thorns	Providence Park	20,438
Seattle Reign FC	Memorial Stadium	6,000 (12,000)
Sky Blue FC	Yurcak Field	5,000
Washington Spirit	Maryland SoccerPlex	5,126
Western New York Flash	Sahlen's Stadium	13,768

Locations of teams for the 2015 National Women's Soccer League season.

=== Personnel and sponsorship ===
Note: All of the teams use Nike as their kit manufacturer.

Team	Head coach	Captain	Shirt sponsor
Boston Breakers	(United States) Tom Durkin	(United States) Katie Schoepfer (United States) Kassey Kallman (United States) Julie King	Steward Health Care
Chicago Red Stars	(United States) Rory Dames	(United States) Lori Chalupny	CJ Wilson Mazda
Houston Dash	(United States) Randy Waldrum	(United States) Ella Masar	BBVA Compass
FC Kansas City	(North Macedonia) Vlatko Andonovski	(United States) Becky Sauerbrunn	Research Medical Center
Portland Thorns	(England) Paul Riley	(Canada) Christine Sinclair	Providence Health & Services
Seattle Reign FC	(England) Laura Harvey	(United States) Keelin Winters	Moda Health
Sky Blue FC	(United States) Jim Gabarra	(United States) Christie Rampone	Meridian Health
Washington Spirit	(United States) Mark Parsons	(United States) Ali Krieger	ProChain Solutions, Inc.
Western New York Flash	(New Zealand) Aaran Lines	(United States) Brittany Taylor	Sahlen's

=== Player acquisition ===
Players were acquired through the 2015 Allocation of national team players on January 14 and the 2015 NWSL College Draft on January 16, as well as free agency and trades.

Notable acquisitions and losses

- Carli Lloyd, the scoring and assist leader for the US women's national team in 2014, was traded from the Western New York Flash to the Houston Dash on October 16, 2014.
- Heather O'Reilly, the scoring and assist leader for the Boston Breakers in 2014, was traded from Boston to FC Kansas City on October 27, 2014.
- Samantha Kerr, the leading scorer for the Western New York Flash in 2014, was traded from Western New York to Sky Blue FC on November 24, 2014.
- Sophie Schmidt, a veteran Allocated Player for the Canadian women's national team, announced in January 2015 she would not play for either Sky Blue FC or the NWSL in order to focus on the 2015 FIFA Women's World Cup.
- Morgan Brian, the two-time Hermann Trophy winner, was chosen No. 1 overall by the Houston Dash in the College Draft on January 16, 2015.
- Jessica McDonald, the leading scorer for the Portland Thorns in 2014, was traded from Portland to the Houston Dash during the draft on January 16, 2015.
- Jodie Taylor, the leading scorer for the Washington Spirit in 2014, was traded from Washington to the Portland Thorns during the draft on January 16, 2015.
- Abby Wambach, the scoring and assist leader for the Western New York Flash in 2013, announced on March 18, 2015, she would not play for either Western New York or the NWSL in order to focus on the 2015 FIFA Women's World Cup. Her rights were subsequently traded to the Seattle Reign in exchange for Sydney Leroux.

== Competition format ==
- Each team will play a total of 20 games, 10 home and 10 away.
- Each team will play all opponents twice, once home and once away, plus four opponents an extra time, split two opponents at home and two away.
- The four teams at the end of the season with the most points will qualify for the playoffs.

=== Results table ===
Abbreviation and Color Key: Boston Breakers – BOS • Chicago Red Stars – CHI • Houston Dash – HOU • FC Kansas City – KC • Portland Thorns FC – POR Seattle Reign FC – SEA • Sky Blue FC – NJ • Washington Spirit – WAS • Western New York Flash – WNY Win • Loss • Tie • Home Game
Club	Match																			
Club	1	2	3	4	5	6	7	8	9	10	11	12	13	14	15	16	17	18	19	20
Boston Breakers	POR	HOU	WNY	CHI	POR	NJ	KC	WAS	SEA	WNY	KC	CHI	CHI	NJ	SEA	POR	WAS	KC	SEA	HOU
Boston Breakers	4–1	3–2	3–1	3–0	1–0	1–1	1–0	1–1	2–3	0–2	2–3	1–1	1–2	3–1	1–2	5–2	2–1	3–0	1–3	0–1
Chicago Red Stars	SEA	POR	NJ	BOS	HOU	KC	SEA	WNY	NJ	HOU	BOS	BOS	WAS	KC	POR	NJ	WAS	WNY	WNY	HOU
Chicago Red Stars	3–2	2–2	1–0	3–0	2–2	1–2	0–0	3–1	0–3	1–2	1–1	1–2	1–1	2–2	2–1	1–1	1–2	0–0	0–2	1–1
Houston Dash	WAS	NJ	BOS	KC	CHI	POR	NJ	POR	WNY	WAS	CHI	KC	WNY	KC	WAS	NJ	SEA	SEA	BOS	CHI
Houston Dash	2–0	1–1	3–2	0–2	2–2	0–1	1–1	0–0	2–0	1–0	1–2	1–1	0–1	3–2	3–1	0–2	1–2	0–3	1–0	1–1
FC Kansas City	NJ	WAS	SEA	HOU	WNY	WNY	CHI	BOS	POR	SEA	WAS	BOS	HOU	HOU	CHI	WNY	POR	BOS	WAS	NJ
FC Kansas City	0–1	3–1	1–0	0–2	0–1	0–0	1–2	1–0	1–1	2–1	3–0	2–3	1–1	3–2	2–2	4–0	3–0	3–0	0–0	2–3
Portland Thorns FC	BOS	WNY	CHI	WAS	BOS	HOU	WAS	HOU	KC	NJ	NJ	SEA	SEA	WNY	BOS	CHI	KC	NJ	WAS	WNY
Portland Thorns FC	4–1	1–0	2–2	2–2	1–0	0–1	2–1	0–0	1–1	2–1	1–0	0–1	3–0	0–2	5–2	2–1	3–0	1–0	3–3	2–3
Seattle Reign FC	WNY	CHI	KC	WAS	NJ	CHI	NJ	BOS	KC	WNY	WNY	WAS	POR	POR	BOS	HOU	HOU	BOS	NJ	WAS
Seattle Reign FC	5–1	3–2	1–0	3–1	1–1	0–0	3–0	2–3	2–1	1–1	4–2	3–0	0–1	3–0	1–2	2–1	0–3	3–1	1–1	1–2
Sky Blue FC	KC	HOU	WAS	CHI	SEA	WAS	BOS	HOU	SEA	CHI	POR	POR	WNY	BOS	WNY	HOU	CHI	POR	SEA	KC
Sky Blue FC	0–1	1–1	1–3	1–0	1–1	1–0	1–1	1–1	3–0	0–3	2–1	1–0	3–3	3–1	1–2	0–2	1–1	1–0	1–1	2–3
Washington Spirit	HOU	KC	NJ	SEA	POR	NJ	WNY	POR	BOS	HOU	KC	SEA	CHI	HOU	BOS	WNY	CHI	KC	POR	SEA
Washington Spirit	2–0	3–1	1–3	3–1	2–2	1–0	3–2	2–1	1–1	1–0	3–0	3–0	1–1	3–1	2–1	1–1	1–2	0–0	3–3	1–2
Western New York Flash	SEA	POR	BOS	KC	KC	WAS	CHI	HOU	BOS	SEA	SEA	NJ	HOU	POR	NJ	KC	WAS	CHI	CHI	POR
Western New York Flash	5–1	1–0	3–1	0–1	0–0	3–2	3–1	2–0	0–2	1–1	4–2	3–3	0–1	0–2	1–2	4–0	1–1	0–0	0–2	3–2

Scores listed as home-away

== League standings ==
Pos	Team	Pld	W	D	L	GF	GA	GD	Pts	Qualification
1	Seattle Reign FC	20	13	4	3	41	21	+20	43	NWSL Shield
2	Chicago Red Stars	20	8	9	3	31	22	+9	33	NWSL Playoffs
3	FC Kansas City (C)	20	9	5	6	32	20	+12	32	NWSL Playoffs
4	Washington Spirit	20	8	6	6	31	28	+3	30	NWSL Playoffs
5	Houston Dash	20	6	6	8	21	26	−5	24	
6	Portland Thorns FC	20	6	5	9	27	29	−2	23	
7	Western New York Flash	20	6	5	9	24	34	−10	23	
8	Sky Blue FC	20	5	7	8	22	28	−6	22	
9	Boston Breakers	20	4	3	13	22	43	−21	15	

Source: NWSL
Rules for classification: Tiebreakers
(C) Champions

=== Tiebreakers ===
The initial determining factor for a team's position in the standings is most points earned, with three points earned for a win, one point for a draw, and zero points for a loss. If two or more teams tie in point total, when determining rank and playoff qualification and seeding, the NWSL uses the following tiebreaker rules, going down the list until all teams are ranked.

If two teams tie:

1. Head-to-head win–loss record between the two teams.
2. Greater goal difference across the entire season (against all teams, not just tied teams).
3. Greatest total number of goals scored (against all teams).
4. Apply #1–3 to games played on the road.
5. Apply #1–3 to games played at home.
6. If teams are still equal, ranking will be determined by a coin toss.

If three or more teams tie, the following rules apply until only two teams remain tied, at which point the two-team tiebreakers listed above are used:

1. Points per game against all other tied teams (total all points earned in games against tied teams and divide by games played against tied teams).
2. Greater goal difference across the entire season (against all teams, not just tied teams).

=== Weekly live standings ===
Considering each week to end on a Sunday

Team \ Week	1	2	3	4	5	6	7	8	9	10	11	12	13	14	15	16	17	18	19	20	21
Seattle Reign FC	1	4	6	3	4	5	6	6	3	2	2	2	2	2	1	1	1	1	1	1	1
Chicago Red Stars	5	5	3	2	1	1	1	1	1	1	1	1	1	1	2	2	2	2	2	2	2
FC Kansas City	6	7	8	5	2	3	3	4	7	5	7	4	3	4	4	5	4	3	3	3	3
Washington Spirit	7	6	2	4	5	2	2	2	2	3	3	3	4	3	3	3	3	4	4	4	4
Houston Dash	3	2	4	6	7	7	4	5	5	4	4	6	6	6	5	4	6	6	7	7	5
Portland Thorns FC	2	1	1	1	3	4	5	7	8	7	8	7	7	7	8	7	5	5	5	5	6
Western New York Flash	9	9	9	8	8	9	7	8	6	8	5	5	5	5	6	6	7	7	8	8	7
Sky Blue FC	4	3	5	7	6	8	9	9	9	9	9	9	9	9	7	8	8	8	6	6	8
Boston Breakers	8	7	7	9	9	6	8	3	4	6	6	8	8	8	9	9	9	9	9	9	9

== Statistical leaders ==
=== Top scorers ===
As of September 6, 2015

Rank	Player	Nation	Club	Goals
1	Crystal Dunn	USA	Washington Spirit	15
2	Kim Little	SCO	Seattle Reign FC	10
2	Allie Long	USA	Portland Thorns FC	10
2	Christen Press	USA	Chicago Red Stars	10
5	Beverly Yanez	USA	Seattle Reign FC	9
6	Jess Fishlock	WAL	Seattle Reign FC	8
7	Jessica McDonald	USA	Houston Dash	7
8	Sofia Huerta	MEX	Chicago Red Stars	6
8	Samantha Kerr	AUS	Sky Blue FC	6
8	Kristie Mewis	USA	Boston Breakers	6
8	Nadia Nadim	DEN	Sky Blue FC	6
8	Amy Rodriguez	USA	FC Kansas City	6

=== Top assists ===
As of September 6, 2015

Rank	Player	Nation	Club	Assists
1	Kim Little	SCO	Seattle Reign	7
2	Vanessa DiBernardo	USA	Chicago Red Stars	5
2	Kealia Ohai	USA	Houston Dash	5
2	Kelley O'Hara	USA	Sky Blue FC	5
2	Megan Rapinoe	USA	Seattle Reign FC	5
6	Jen Hoy	USA	Chicago Red Stars	4
6	Allie Long	USA	Portland Thorns FC	4
6	Sam Mewis	USA	Western New York Flash	4
6	Christine Nairn	USA	Washington Spirit	4
6	Amy Rodriguez	USA	FC Kansas City	4
6	Meleana Shim	USA	Portland Thorns FC	4
6	Lynn Williams	USA	Western New York Flash	4

=== Goalkeeping ===
As of September 6, 2015

(Minimum of 900 minutes played)

Rank	Goalkeeper	Club	GP	MINS	SOG	SVS	GA	GAA	W-L-T	SHO
1	(United States) Michele Dalton	Chicago Red Stars	12	1080	58	47	11	0.917	6–1–5	5
2	(United States) Nicole Barnhart	FC Kansas City	17	1530	70	54	16	0.941	8–6–3	8
3	(United States) Haley Kopmeyer	Seattle Reign FC	11	990	52	41	11	1.000	7–1–3	4
4	(United States) Michelle Betos	Portland Thorns FC	14	1260	63	45	18	1.286	5–7–2	2
5	(United States) Brittany Cameron	Sky Blue FC	20	1792	114	87	27	1.357	5–8–7	4
6	(Canada) Erin McLeod	Houston Dash	11	932	74	60	15	1.364	3–4–3	2
7	(United States) Kelsey Wys	Washington Spirit	11	990	51	35	16	1.455	5–4–2	3
8	(United States) Chantel Jones	Western New York Flash	13	1155	81	60	21	1.615	4–4–5	2
9	(United States) Alyssa Naeher	Boston Breakers	12	1080	95	65	30	2.500	2–9–1	0

== NWSL Playoffs ==
The top four teams from the regular season will compete for the NWSL Championship.

Semi-finals
1	Seattle Reign FC	3
4	Washington Spirit	0
2	Chicago Red Stars	0
3	FC Kansas City	3

Championship
1	Seattle Reign FC	0
3	FC Kansas City	1

=== Semi-finals ===
September 13, 2015
12:30pm (CDT)

Chicago Red Stars	0–3	FC Kansas City
Johnson (yellow card) 66'	Report	Rodriguez 12', 25'; Tymrak 21'

Toyota Park
Bridgeview, Illinois
Attendance: 2,013
Referee: Karen Abt
September 13, 2015
6:30pm (PDT)

Seattle Reign FC	3–0	Washington Spirit
Mathias (yellow card) 52'; Yanez 71'; Rapinoe 75'; Nogueira 90'	Report

Memorial Stadium
Seattle, Washington
Attendance: 5,021
Referee: Christopher Spivey

=== Championship ===
October 1, 2015
6:30pm (PDT)

Seattle Reign FC	0–1	FC Kansas City
	Report	Sauerbrunn (yellow card) 76'; Rodriguez 78'

Providence Park
Portland, Oregon
Attendance: 13,264
Referee: Katja Koroleva

== Individual awards ==
=== Monthly awards ===
Month	Player of the Month		Club	Month's Statline
April	(United States)	Christen Press	Chicago Red Stars	4G, 1A in 2 games; Red Stars 1-0-1 in April
May	(United States)	Sofia Huerta	Chicago Red Stars	5G, 1A in 5 games; Red Stars 3-0-2 in May
June	(Scotland)	Kim Little	Seattle Reign FC	3G, 1A in 3 games; Reigh FC 3-0-0 in June
July	(United States)	Carli Lloyd	Houston Dash	3G in 3 games; Dash 2-1-1 in July (2-0-1 in Lloyd appearances)
August	(United States)	Crystal Dunn	Washington Spirit	6G, 1A in 6 games; Spirit 2-1-3 in August

=== Weekly awards ===
Week	Player of the Week		Club	Week's Statline
Week 1	(United States)	Megan Rapinoe	Seattle Reign FC	3G, 1A
Week 2	(United States)	Christen Press	Chicago Red Stars	2G, 1A
Week 3	(United States)	Crystal Dunn	Washington Spirit	2G
Week 4	(United States)	Becky Edwards	Western New York Flash	1G, 1A
Week 5	(United States)	Sofia Huerta	Chicago Red Stars	2G, 1A
Week 6	(United States)	Sofia Huerta	Chicago Red Stars	2G
Week 7	(United States)	Bianca Henninger	Houston Dash	8 saves
Week 8	(United States)	Crystal Dunn	Washington Spirit	1G (GWG)
Week 9	(Wales)	Jessica Fishlock	Seattle Reign	1G, 1A
Week 10	(United States)	Michelle Betos	Portland Thorns FC	4 saves, 1G (GTG)
Week 11	(United States)	Crystal Dunn	Washington Spirit	1G (GWG)
Week 12	(United States)	Sinead Farrelly	Portland Thorns FC	1G (GWG)
Week 13	(United States)	Shea Groom	FC Kansas City	1G (GWG), 2A
Week 14	(Australia)	Michelle Heyman	Western New York Flash	1G
Week 15	(United States)	Beverly Yanez	Seattle Reign FC	2G
Week 16	(United States)	Crystal Dunn	Washington Spirit	3G (GWG)
Week 17	(United States)	Alyssa Naeher	Boston Breakers	12 saves in August 8 Spirit game
Week 18	(United States)	Crystal Dunn	Washington Spirit	1G (GWG)
Week 19	(Scotland)	Kim Little	Seattle Reign FC	3G (GWG)
Week 20	(United States)	Crystal Dunn	Washington Spirit	2G 1A
Week 21	(Canada)	Karina LeBlanc	Chicago Red Stars	19 Shots/10 SOG/9 Saves vs Houston

=== Annual awards ===
Award	Winner		
Golden Boot	(United States) Crystal Dunn	Washington Spirit	15 goals
Rookie of the Year	(United States) Danielle Colaprico	Chicago Red Stars	Played in all 20 games
Goalkeeper of the Year	(United States) Michelle Betos	Portland Thorns FC	1.286 GAA, 45 saves
Defender of the Year	(United States) Becky Sauerbrunn	FC Kansas City	990 minutes
Coach of the Year	(England) Laura Harvey	Seattle Reign	13–3–4 regular season
Most Valuable Player	(United States) Crystal Dunn	Washington Spirit	15 goals, 3 assists

NWSL Best XI
Position	First team			Second team		
Goalkeeper	(United States) Michelle Betos	Portland Thorns FC	45 saves	(United States) Nicole Barnhart	FC Kansas City	8 shutouts
Defender	(United States) Lauren Barnes	Seattle Reign FC	1,800 minutes	(United States) Stephanie Cox	Seattle Reign FC	1,800 minutes
Defender	(United States) Julie Johnston	Chicago Red Stars	1.10 team GAA	(United States) Kendall Fletcher	Seattle Reign FC	2 goals, 2 assists
Defender	(United States) Amy LePeilbet	FC Kansas City	1,800 minutes	(United States) Arin Gilliland	Chicago Red Stars	1.10 team GAA
Defender	(United States) Becky Sauerbrunn	FC Kansas City	1.00 team GAA	(United States) Leigh Ann Robinson	FC Kansas City	1,800 minutes
Midfielder	(Wales) Jess Fishlock	Seattle Reign FC	8 goals, 2 assists	(United States) Danielle Colaprico	Chicago Red Stars	1,776 minutes
Midfielder	(Scotland) Kim Little	Seattle Reign FC	10 goals, 7 assists	(United States) Lauren Holiday	FC Kansas City	2 goals, 2 assists
Midfielder	(United States) Allie Long	Portland Thorns FC	10 goals, 4 assists	(United States) Carli Lloyd	Houston Dash	4 goals
FW // MF	(United States) Crystal Dunn	Washington Spirit	15 goals, 3 assists	(United States) Keelin Winters	Seattle Reign FC	1,654 minutes
Forward	(United States) Christen Press	Chicago Red Stars	10 goals, 2 assists	(United States) Sofia Huerta	Chicago Red Stars	6 goals, 3 assists
Forward	(United States) Beverly Yanez	Seattle Reign FC	9 goals	(United States) Megan Rapinoe	Seattle Reign FC	5 goals, 5 assists

NWSL Championship Game MVP
Player	Club	Record
(United States) Amy Rodriguez	FC Kansas City	Scored the game-winning goal
