= Tatjana Haenni =

Swiss association football player

Tatjana Ingeborg Haenni (born December 2, 1966, in Biel, Switzerland) is a former Swiss soccer player and current official in women's soccer.

== Career ==
Haenni is one of the most influential women in Swiss soccer. From January 2019 to July 2020, she headed the women's soccer division at the Swiss Football Association (SFV). When the SFV restructured in July 2020 and created a "women's soccer" division, Tatjana Haenni became the director of the new division and headed it until 2022. This made her the highest-ranking woman in Swiss soccer and the first woman ever to serve on the SFV's executive board. Haenni has left her mark on women's soccer as an official: First at UEFA, then at FIFA and the Swiss Football Association, she contributed to the boom of the women's game.

=== Active soccer and coaching career nationally ===
Tatjana Haenni started her active soccer career in 1979 at the age of 12 as a player for DFC Bern, then played for SV Seebach for several years and one season for FC Rapid Lugano. Her active career lasted from 1979 to 1998, after which she obtained the UEFA/SFV A coaching diploma and, in 2018, the SFV instructor diploma. She briefly coached at SV Seebach. There she strengthened the women's section in an honorary capacity from 2001 to 2003. In 2005 she became president of FFC Zurich-Seebach, which became FC Zurich Women in 2008. From 2008 to 2018 she was president of the women's soccer section at FC Zurich.

=== Active soccer career internationally ===
From 1984 to 1996 she played 23 international matches for the Swiss national team, in which she scored one goal.

=== Professional stations in women's soccer ===
Haenni is a pioneer in Swiss soccer. In 1994, she also switched professionally to soccer and joined UEFA as an administrator, where she was responsible for women's competitions. She was the first UEFA employee responsible for women's soccer exclusively. After a one-year stint at Sat 1 Schweiz TV (live football broadcasting), Haenni worked at FIFA from 1999 to 2017 as manager and head of women's soccer division, where she helped develop international women's soccer in various positions for 18 years. As director of the Competitions Division, she worked hard to create a dedicated women's soccer division. She wanted structures tailored to women's soccer and its own women's soccer experts. Among other things, she was responsible for organizing the Women's World Cup finals and co-organizing the 2011 Women's World Cup in Germany and the 2015 Women's World Cup in Canada. From 2017 to 2018, Tatjana Haenni took a detour to Y Sport, a sports consulting company in England, where she learned about the business side of women's soccer. In 2018, she began working for the Swiss Football Association as head of women's and girls' soccer, and was appointed director of Swiss women's soccer in 2020. At the Swiss Football Association, Haenni said she wanted to work to eliminate "structural discrimination against women in sports."

In 2022, Haenni was honored with the "Swiss Sport Managers Award" for her commitment to women's soccer. Thanks to her efforts, it demonstrates women’s soccer as strong and innovative. At the ceremony, she said, "I am particularly pleased that women's sports has received greater visibility and that the position of women in sports has been strengthened as a result."

Haenni holds an MBA in sports management from the University of Bayreuth and CAS diversity and gender equality competence from the FHNW in Olten.

Since January 1, 2023, Haenni has been employed by NWSL, one of the world's top professional women's soccer leagues, as Sporting Director and part of the management team.

== Life ==
Tatjana Haenni grew up in Bern, but due to her activities in soccer, she traveled extensively early in her career and lived in various places in Switzerland. She calls Zurich, where she lived from 1999 until she left for New York in January 2023, her home.

Tatjana Haenni is openly lesbian. Although she has not made an official public statement, her sexuality has been widely known within football circles and throughout her work with UEFA and FIFA. She is reportedly open about her sexual orientation. Today, she is single and lives separately from her former partner.
