= Jessica Berman =

American lawyer and sports executive (born 1977)

- Berman in 2026

Commissioner of the National Women's Soccer League
- Incumbent
- Assumed office April 20, 2022
- Preceded by: Marla Messing (acting)

Personal details
- Born: 1977 (age 48–49) New York City, U.S.
- Spouse: Brad Berman
- Children: 2
- Education: University of Michigan (BA); Fordham University (JD)

Jessica Berman (born 1977) is an American lawyer who has served as the commissioner of the National Women's Soccer League (NWSL) since 2022.

== Early life ==
Berman grew up in a Conservative Jewish family in Brooklyn, New York. She attended East Midwood Jewish Center. She was the manager of the boys' baseball team at James Madison High School. She then earned a bachelor's degree in sports management from the University of Michigan, where she was an assistant manager of the men's hockey team. After Michigan, Berman attended Fordham University for law school, and graduated in 2002.

== Career ==
After graduating from Fordham, Berman joined the law firm Proskauer Rose as an associate working in the labor and employment department. At Proskauer Rose, she was a member of the team that negotiated an end to the 2004–05 NHL lockout and a new 10-year collective bargaining agreement between the National Hockey League and the National Hockey League Players' Association.

In 2006, Berman moved in-house to the NHL after more than 3 years at Proskauer Rose. Over her 13 years with the league, she rose to become the NHL's deputy general counsel and vice president of community development. Her responsibilities included the league's corporate social responsibility efforts and running the NHL Foundation. During Berman's tenure in the NHL, she was viewed as a candidate to eventually become the first female commissioner of a men's professional sports league, and she was named a "Forty under 40" by Sports Business Journal in 2014.

In 2019, she was named the deputy commissioner and executive vice president of business affairs of the National Lacrosse League (NLL), becoming the first female deputy commissioner of a men's professional sports league. At the NLL, Berman was responsible for the league's growth and legal affairs.

On March 8, 2022, Berman was named commissioner of the National Women's Soccer League (NWSL), the highest professional women's soccer league in the United States, for a 4-year term that began on April 20. The NWSL had been without a permanent commissioner since the resignation of Lisa Baird in October 2021. Berman's hiring process was the first to include player interviews, a demand in the wake of the 2021 NWSL abuse scandal.

On May 22, 2024, Berman won the Sports Business Journal's 2024 Executive of the Year award.

On May 9, 2025, Angel City FC defender Savy King collapsed on the field and had a heart attack, resulting in her needing serious medical attention including an AED and chest compressions on the field. Jessica Berman, as commissioner, did not stop the game and instead required players to continue playing, despite all players, coaches, and announcers being distraught. Berman eventually admitted the game should have stopped and NWSLPA President, Meghann Burke, pushed for the creation of new rules surrounding these medical events.

In the later half of the 2025 season, attention turned to Berman relating to Washington Spirit star Trinity Rodman's upcoming free agency. Berman stated, on more than one occasion, that "We want Trinity in our league and we will fight for her," however when the Spirit proposed a deal that was completely cap-compliant to keep Trinity in the league, Berman unilaterally denied it. This deal is now subject to arbitration and the grievance process as filed by the NWSLPA on Rodman's behalf.

== Personal life ==
Jessica Berman lives in Westchester County, New York with her husband and two children. Her family belongs to the Westchester Jewish Center. In 2023, Berman was awarded the David J. Stern Leadership Award by the UJA-Federation of New York.
