= Memorial Stadium (Asheville) =

Multi-use stadium in Asheville, North Carolina

Coordinates: 35.586619°N 82.547879°W

- Interactive map of Memorial Stadium
- Location: Asheville, North Carolina
- Owner: City of Asheville
- Operator: City of Asheville
- Capacity: 5,000
- Surface: Artificial turf

Construction
- Groundbreaking: 1924
- Opened: 1925

Tenants
- Current; Asheville Grizzlies (CCFL); Asheville City SC (USL2) (2017–2019) (2022–); Past; Asheville Splash (W-Lg) (2001–2004); Asheville Bears; Asheville Assault (NWFA)

Memorial Stadium is a multi-use stadium located in Asheville, North Carolina. The stadium was completed in 1925 to serve as a regional athletic and special events facility. Memorial Stadium is not to be confused with the similarly named Asheville High School Memorial Stadium.

Memorial Stadium's entrance was originally intended to serve as a memorial to Western North Carolina's war veterans but the memorial was never entirely completed. Recently plans have been set afoot to complete the memorial. As part of a large scale renovation of the facility which included the installation of a new artificial turf playing surface, there are plans to move a World War II memorial onto the site.

Memorial Stadium is currently home to the Asheville Grizzlies - a semi-pro football team in the Central Carolina Football League - and Asheville City Soccer Club, who compete in USL League Two and USL W League.

Memorial Stadium sits adjacent to HomeTrust Park, home of the South Atlantic League's Asheville Tourists.
