= Marla Messing =

American sports executive

- Born: Marla Pearlstein
- Education: University of Michigan (BA); University of Chicago Law School (JD)
- Known for: FIFA World Cup and FIFA Women's World Cup

Marla Messing (née Pearlstein; born 1964) is an American attorney and sports executive. She is known primarily for her work in soccer – first with the 1994 FIFA World Cup and as one of the first executives of Major League Soccer in 1995. In 1996, Messing became president and chief executive officer of the committee that organized the 1999 FIFA Women's World Cup. Most recently, Messing served as the interim CEO of the National Women's Soccer League. From 2019 to 2021 she was the CEO of USTA Southern California.

== Career ==
Messing is a graduate of the University of Michigan (1986) and University of Chicago Law School (1989). She was a corporate attorney with Latham & Watkins before joining the 1994 FIFA World Cup Organizing Committee, initially as the Special Assistant to the chairman and CEO, Alan Rothenberg, and eventually as the Executive Vice President of the committee. In 1995, Messing became senior vice president of Major League Soccer and one year later was appointed the president and CEO of the 1999 FIFA Women's World Cup. Messing submitted the committee's business plan for the 1999 FIFA tournament in September 1996, two days before giving birth to Natalie, her first child. Following the 1999 FIFA Women's World Cup, Messing became a soccer mom to her three children. She returned to the world of sports in 2016 when she became a vice president of the LA2024 Olympic and Paralympic Exploratory Committee, and helped the City of Los Angeles secure the 2028 Summer Olympics and Paralympic Games.

== Named Interim NWSL CEO ==
Following the resignation of Lisa Baird as NWSL Commissioner after fallout from incidents with the North Carolina Courage coach Paul Riley and staff at the Washington Spirit, the NWSL executive committee named Messing as interim CEO of the NWSL on October 18, 2021. Messing immediately went to work vowing to “get our house in order”. In short order, Messing struck a deal with the Player's Association on eight separate demands related to the fallout from the various incidents. Messing was then tasked with bringing the Washington Spirit into good standing with the league as the franchise had been estranged from the NWSL and banned from league governance following the firing of head coach Richie Burke. Messing oversaw the sale of the Washington Spirit, encouraging owner Steve Baldwin to sell the team to one of the franchise's minority owners, Michele Kang, for a record $35 million. With the sale, the Spirit were reinstated into good standing with the rest of the league. The 2021 season came to a close during Championship Weekend in Louisville, KY., as the Spirit won their first NWSL Championship defeating the Chicago Red Stars 2–1. During Championship Weekend, Messing announced that Nike had agreed to an eight-year sponsorship extension with the league. In January 2022, it was announced that the NWSL and NWSL Players Association agreed to their first-ever collective bargaining agreement, which would introduce player free agency, higher salaries with annual increases and other health and wellness benefits through 2026. “This is a historic moment for women’s soccer in the United States,” Messing said in a statement. The 2022 NWSL league schedule was announced and included the addition of the NWSL Challenge Cup. and the 2022 NWSL Draft for college seniors. In January, Messing negotiated with the new owners of Real Salt Lake, David Blitzer and Ryan Smith, the option for the NWSL Utah Royals FC, which would bring the league to 13 teams by 2024. New national sponsor deals with Voyager and Delta Air Lines were also announced. The 2022 NWSL season kicked off with two new franchises, San Diego Wave FC and Angel City FC, all of which completed the turnaround of the league.

== 1999 FIFA Women’s World Cup ==
The 1999 FIFA Women's World Cup logo

When Messing took over the Women's World Cup Organizing Committee, she along with then U.S. Soccer President, Alan Rothenberg, petitioned FIFA to allow them to move the event into several large, NFL-sized stadiums in major markets across the United States, instead of small soccer facilities along the East Coast, including Giants Stadium in New Jersey, Foxboro Stadium outside of Boston, FedExField in suburban Maryland, Soldier Field in Chicago, Stanford Stadium in Palo Alto, Calif., and the Rose Bowl (stadium) in Pasadena, Calif. With the launch of Major League Soccer, and strong grassroots marketing, it was determined there would be sufficient excitement and ticket demand for the larger venues. In June and July 1999 the FIFA Women's World Cup became the largest women's-only sporting event in history, selling 650,000 tickets, including 90,185 tickets for the final match of the USA vs. China at the Rose Bowl. The tournament had a worldwide television audience of nearly 1 billion viewers, and more than 40 million viewers in the United States for the Women's World Cup Final. Messing and the team was celebrated by the president of the United States Bill Clinton and First Lady Hillary Clinton with a ceremony honoring the team at the White House in July 1999. To commemorate the 20-year anniversary of the 1999 FIFA World Cup, a statue of Brandi Chastain and the 1999 U.S. Women's Soccer team was unveiled at the Rose Bowl in 2019. Messing was on hand, saying “Those women and their accomplishments will be forever immortalized on these grounds.”

== Netflix and HBO ==
On May 12, 2020, it was announced that Netflix had secured the rights to long-time New York Times sportswriter Jere Longman’s book, The Girls of Summer, which details the history of the 1999 U.S. Women's National Team and the FIFA Women's World Cup, to be developed into a feature film. Messing will be the Executive Producer of the film along with Krista Smith and Jill Mazursky. Messing can also be seen in HBO's documentary, Dare to Dream, which also covers the rise of the U.S. Women's National Team and its victory in 1999.

== Honors and Civic Life ==
Messing has been recognized for her work in sports by the Sports Business Journal with the Champion in Sports Business Award and Female Executive of the Year Award. She has also been recognized by WISE – Women in Sports and Events, and Ad Age. Messing has served on the Boards of Directors of the Southern California Committee for the Olympic Games, the Los Angeles Sports Council and Los Angeles Sports and Entertainment Commission, the U.S. Soccer Foundation, the 1999 FIFA Women's World Cup, and Brentwood School (Los Angeles). In 2019, City of Los Angeles Mayor Eric Garcetti appointed Messing to the Commission on the Status of Women.
