= Arthur M. Blank Crest Cup =

Soccer knockout tournament in the U.S.

- Founded: 2028 (expected)
- Region: United States (CONCACAF)
- Teams: 26+ (18 NWSL, 8+ USL)
- Qualifier for: CONCACAF W Champions Cup

The Arthur M. Blank Crest Cup is a knockout cup competition in women's soccer in the United States. It will feature every team in the National Women's Soccer League (NWSL) and the USL Super League.

== History ==
In May 2026, it was reported that the United States Soccer Federation (USSF) had begun discussions to start a national women's cup competition similar to the men's U.S. Open Cup. Starting as soon as 2028, it could feature teams in the National Women's Soccer League (NWSL), USL Super League, and upcoming WPSL Pro.

On October 14, 2026, the USSF announced the establishment of the Arthur M. Blank Crest Cup as a national knockout cup competition to determine a women's club champion; it was named after USSF billionaire donor Arthur Blank. Expected to debut in 2028, it will feature every team in the NWSL (18 teams by then) and USL Super League (8 teams currently). USSF president Cindy Parlow Cone said she hoped the tournament would eventually include amateur teams as well. The tournament will award the champions US$1.1 million in prize money and serve as a qualifier for the CONCACAF W Champions Cup.

== See also ==
- USASA National Women's Open
- USASA National Women's Amateur
