= Lydia Vandenbergh =

American soccer defender (born 1984)

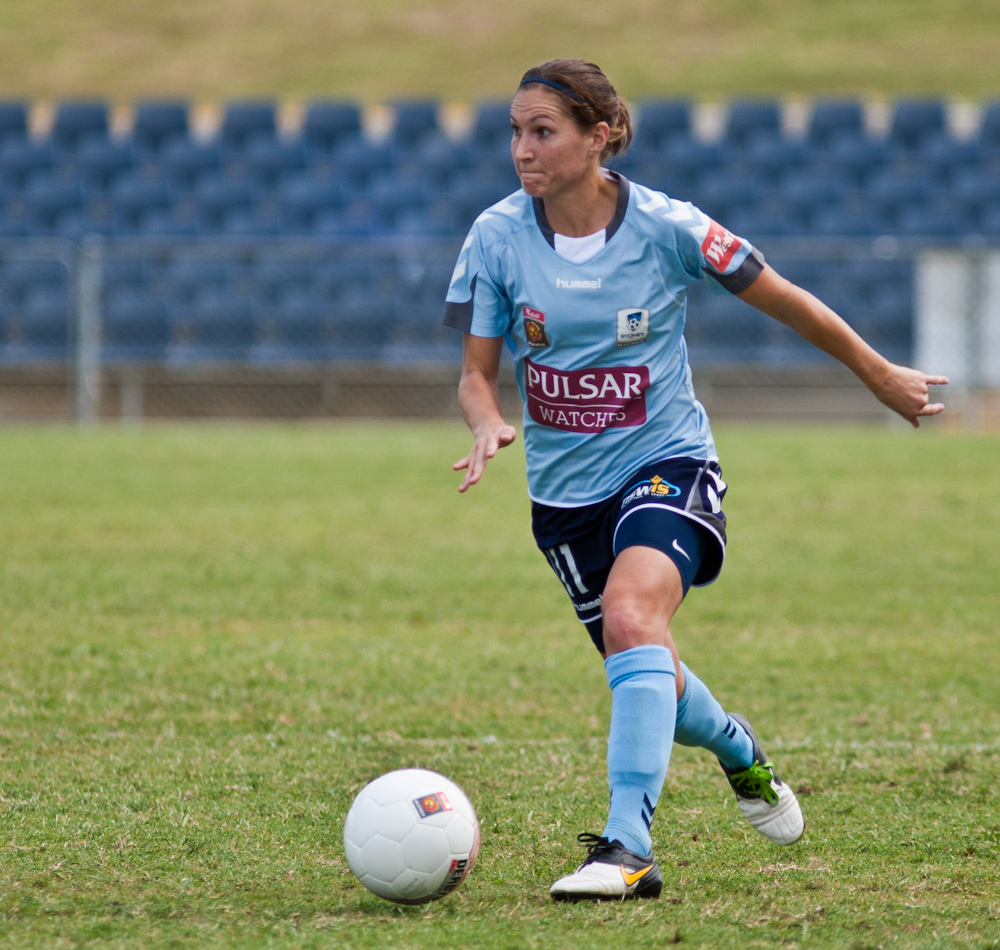

Personal information
- Full name: Lydia Kathleen Jackson
- Birth name: Lydia Kathleen Vandenbergh
- Date of birth: January 2, 1984 (age 42)
- Place of birth: Brevard, North Carolina, U.S.
- Height: 5 ft 3 in (1.60 m)
- Position: Midfielder

College career
Years	Team	Apps	(Gls)
2002–2005	Clemson Tigers		

Senior career*
Years	Team	Apps	(Gls)
2000–2004	Blue Ridge Rapids/Asheville Splash	33	(3)
2005–2008	Charlotte Lady Eagles	51	(4)
2006	→ Santos (loan)		
2007	→ ACE Kurdana/Cotia (loan)		
2009	Saint Louis Athletica	0	(0)
2009–2010	Chicago Red Stars	12	(0)
2009	→ Central Coast Mariners (loan)	11	(4)
2010–2011	Sydney FC	11	(0)
2011	magicJack	10	(0)
2012	Fortuna Hjørring		
2013	Chicago Red Stars	17	(0)
2014	Carolina Elite Cobras	17	(0)
2018	Asheville City SC		

Managerial career
- 2006–2007: Matthews Soccer Club
- 2008: Charlotte Christian Knights (assistant)
- 2008–2009: Florida State Seminoles (volunteer assistant)
- 2009–2010: Western Carolina Catamounts (assistant)
- 2010: Coastal Carolina Chanticleers (assistant)
- 2012–2013: Warren Wilson Owls (assistant)
- 2014–2015: Warren Wilson Owls (associate head coach)
- 2015–2020: Warren Wilson Owls
- * Club domestic league appearances and goals

Lydia Kathleen Jackson (née Vandenbergh; born January 2, 1984) is an American soccer coach and retired player who played as a midfielder.

== Coaching career ==
Vandenbergh worked as a coach for Matthews Soccer Club in Charlotte, North Carolina from 2006 to 2007. In 2008, she was an assistant coach at Charlotte Christian School, while also serving as a volunteer assistant coach for the Florida State Seminoles. From 2009 to 2010, she worked as an assistant for the Western Carolina Catamounts women's team, and in 2010 was an assistant coach for the Coastal Carolina Chanticleers. In 2012, Vandenbergh became an assistant coach for the Warren Wilson College women's soccer team under head coach Stacey Enos. She then became the associate head coach of the team in 2014, before being appointed as the head coach in 2015. She served as the coach for nine years while also working as an assistant athletic director, before stepping down from her roles in 2020.

== Personal life ==
Vandenbergh grew up in Pisgah Forest, North Carolina, and graduated from Brevard High School in 2002. She graduated from Clemson University with a Bachelor of Science in computer science in 2006, and later from Georgia Southern University with a Master of Science in kinesiology. She lives in Swannanoa, North Carolina, with her husband Joshua Jackson.
