= National Women's Soccer League Players Association =

United States players' union

NWSL Players Association
- National Women's Soccer League Players Association
- Formation: May 2017; 9 years ago
- Website: www.nwslplayers.com

The National Women's Soccer League Players Association (often known as NWSL Players Association or NWSLPA) is the officially recognized union of players in the National Women's Soccer League (NWSL).

== History ==
The NWSLPA was formed in May 2017 under the leadership of Yael Averbuch and represented by lawyer and former WPS player Meghann Burke. The NWSLPA officially unionized in November 2018.

Until the end of the 2021 season, the NWSLPA membership excluded United States federation players because those players were contracted with the US Soccer Federation (USSF) for their play in the NWSL. In December 2021, the USSF and the union representing the U.S. national team (USWNT) agreed to end the NWSL federation players system, which means that USWNT players playing in the NWSL are now contracted directly to their NWSL teams and that those players will also be represented in their club employment by the NWSLPA.

== Leadership ==
The NWSLPA is led by president Haley Hopkins, elected in 2025, and executive director Meghann Burke. The executive team is advised by an advisory board and a group of player representatives of two players from each NWSL team.

List of presidents

- Yael Averbuch, FC Kansas City/Seattle Reign FC (2017–2019)
- Brooke Elby, Chicago Red Stars (2019)
- Tori Huster, Washington Spirit (2020–2025)
- Haley Hopkins, Kansas City Current (2025–present)

== Awards ==
The NWSL Players Association began awarding its own NWSL Players' Awards, voted on by the players of the NWSL, in 2019. These awards are considered one of the major end-of-season awards for NWSL players alongside the league's own awards. As there are often differences between the league's own awards and the NWSL Players' Awards, many NWSL players consider the NWSL Players' Awards to be more prestigious as they are decided by only players themselves. The inaugural edition of the NWSL Players' Awards included three categories: Players' Player of the Year, Players' Rookie of the Year, and Players' Team of the Year.
