= Asheville Splash =

The Asheville Splash were a women's soccer franchise founded in 2001, and from 2003–2004 were members of the Atlantic Division of the USL W-League.

== History ==
The team changed its name from the Blue Ridge Rapids in 2002 due to a trademark dispute with the Colorado Rapids. They played at Memorial Stadium in Asheville, North Carolina. The team folded after the 2004 USL W-League season. The team's mascot was an otter.

In 2004, the club's programs promoted a future men's team, the Asheville Slide, which was never founded.

== Staff ==
- Ownership: Bernie Arghiere, Gabriele Beckman, Calvin Bennett, Gregg Condon, George Escaravage, Todd Escaravage, John Hepler, Mark Jordan, Steve Woody
- Managing partner, chief executive officer: Steve Woody
- Chief operating officer: Desmond Armstrong
- Media relations director: Bob Somerville

== Former players ==
- Stacey Enos
- Lydia Vandenbergh
- Rebekah Fergusson
- Abby Crumpton
- Katie Roark
- Ricarda Nelson
- Izler Browne

== Year-by-year ==
Year	Div.	League	Reg. Season	Playoffs
2003	2	USL W-League	4th, Atlantic	Did not qualify
2004	1	USL W-League	3rd, Atlantic	Did not qualify

== Legacy ==
In 2018, Asheville City SC's newly formed women's soccer team hired Stacey Enos, who had captained the Splash from 2001–2003, as its inaugural head coach.

On June 19, 2021, Asheville City's women's side held a commemorative match marking the 20th anniversary of the Splash's founding. Icarus FC designed Asheville Splash throwback kits for the occasion.
