= Amanda Duffy (soccer) =

Association football player (born 1980/1981)

Personal information
- Date of birth: 1980 or 1981 (age 45–46)
- Place of birth: Jacksonville, North Carolina, United States
- Height: 5 ft 7 in (1.70 m)
- Position: Forward

College career
Years	Team	Apps	(Gls)
1998–2002	East Carolina Pirates		(33)

Senior career*
Years	Team	Apps	(Gls)
- Raleigh Wings
2003	Hampton Roads Piranhas		
2005	Central Florida Krush		
2006	Danmarks IF		
- * Club domestic league appearances and goals

Amanda Duffy (born 1980 or 1981) is a former soccer player and executive. Previously Duffy had been president of Louisville City FC in the USL, director of operations for USL Second Division, and senior director of the USL W-League before joining the NWSL as managing director of operations in December 2016. On January 15, 2019, Duffy was named president of the NWSL, holding the position for a year. She later spent two seasons as executive vice-president of Orlando Pride.

== Early life ==
Duffy first played soccer when she was 5 years old, participating on an all-boys team for seven years because there were no girls' clubs. She attended Dixon High School in Holly Ridge, North Carolina, played soccer for the school, and graduated in 1998. Dixon High inducted her into its hall of fame in October 2013.

== Playing career ==
=== East Carolina University ===
Duffy attended East Carolina University from 1998 to 2003 as an undergraduate and played for its women's soccer team, where she became the team's all-time leader in career (33) and single-season goals (14), and in career points (83), and is second in all-time assists. She was twice named a first-team all-Conference USA player. ECU inducted Duffy into its sports hall of fame in 2012, the first women's soccer player to be inducted. Duffy also served on the ECU women's soccer coaching staff after her graduation.

=== Carolina Courage (WUSA) ===
Duffy was not selected in the 2003 WUSA Draft, but was invited to the Women's United Soccer Association league's Carolina Courage preseason camps by assistant coach Susan Ellis — who was previously an assistant coach with the Raleigh Wings — in February 2003. However, she did not make the regular-season roster.

=== USL W-League ===
While pursuing a graduate degree in sport management at ECU, Duffy continued playing in the USL W-League for the Raleigh Wings, Hampton Roads Piranhas, and Central Florida Krush. During her W-League career, she was part of teams that won a national championship (Piranhas, 2003) and three division championships.

=== Norrettan (Sweden) ===
In 2006, Duffy played professionally for Swedish club Danmarks IF in Norrettan.

== Executive career ==
=== USL W-League ===
Duffy was an intern at the United Soccer League's headquarters for six months in 2005, as part of her work toward a master's degree in sports administration. At the time, Duffy was playing in the USL-operated W-League. After completing the internship and acquiring her master's degree, she moved to Sweden to play soccer professionally for a year, after which she returned to USL in 2007 for an entry-level administrative role. She remained at USL for seven years, eventually becoming director of operations, then senior director of the W-League.

=== Louisville City FC (USL) ===
Louisville City FC general manager Djorn Buchholz hired Duffy to be vice president of operations in October 2014, the club's third full-time employee. She was subsequently promoted to general manager in December when Buchholz resigned, and was promoted again in November 2015 to president, where she was the only woman in the league to serve as a club president. After leaving the club, she was succeeded as president by John Neace.

During her tenure as president, the club set records in attendance and pushed for a new soccer-specific stadium.

=== National Women's Soccer League (NWSL) ===
The NWSL hired Duffy in December 2016 to the new position of managing director of operations, granting her responsibility over growing the league's staff, improving league standards, and overseeing league policies and the league's partnership with part-owners A+E Networks.

Since the resignation of league commissioner Jeff Plush in March 2017, she has also filled the league's administrative roles in lieu of a full-time replacement.

Her work with the NWSL led to AdWeek naming her one of the 35 most influential women in sports in 2017. She was promoted to president, the league's highest office, on January 15, 2019. She announced her intention to step down from the role in January 2020.

=== Orlando Pride (NWSL) ===
On January 7, 2020, it was announced Duffy would become Executive Vice President of NWSL team Orlando Pride. She officially stepped down as president of the NWSL on February 14, 2020. Following a change of ownership, Duffy was let go by the club at the end of the 2021 season.
