= Cheryl Bailey =

American sports executive (born 1954/1955)

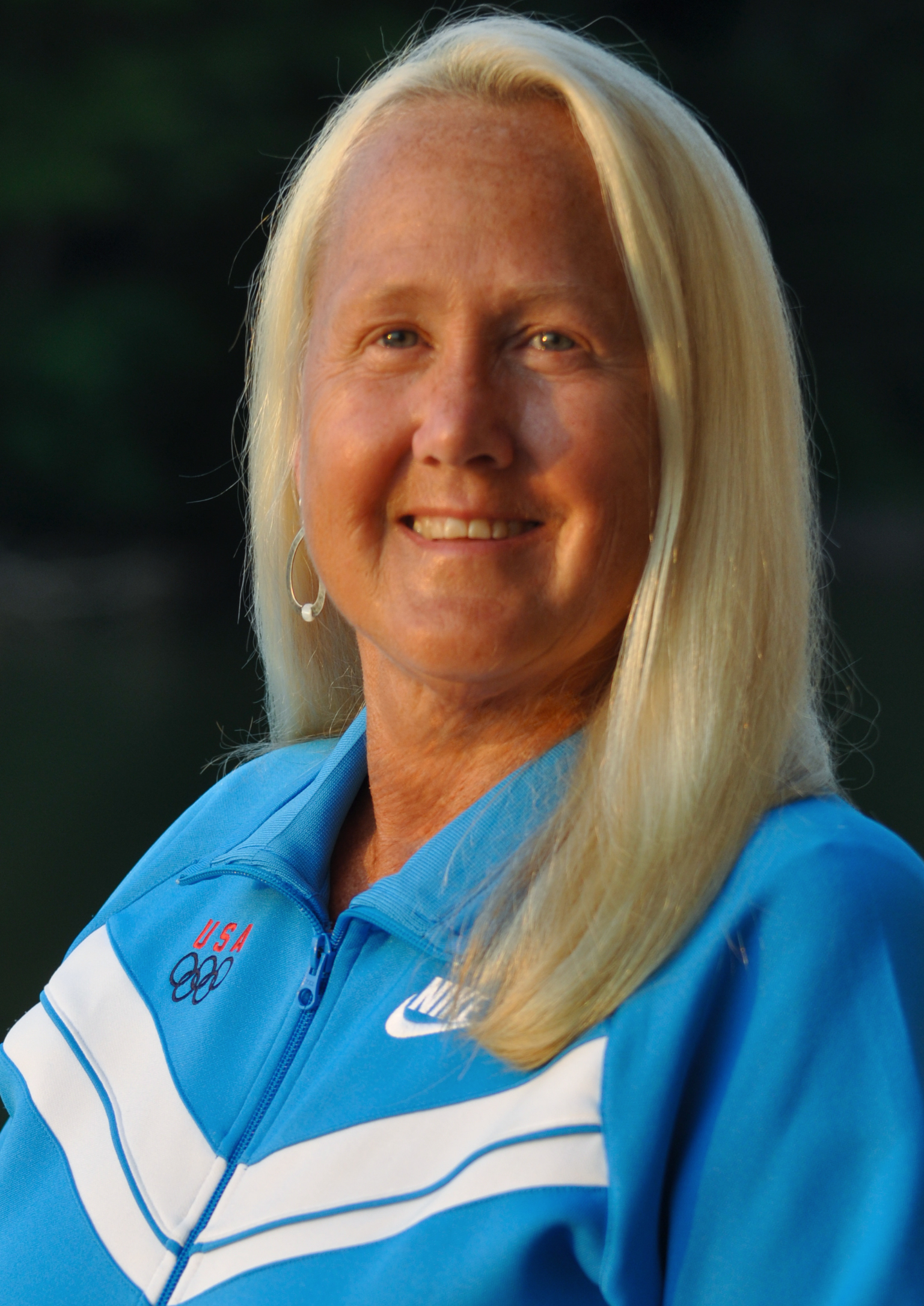
- Cheryl Bailey in 2018

Commissioner of National Women's Soccer League
- In office November 2012 – January 2015
- Preceded by: Position Established
- Succeeded by: Jeff Plush

Cheryl Bailey (née Marra; born 1954 or 1955) is the former executive director of the National Women's Soccer League. She formerly served as general manager of the United States women's national soccer team from 2007 to 2011.

== Early career ==
Bailey is from Jamestown, New York. In 1979, Bailey was appointed as the athletic director of Denison University a position she held until 1990. During her time at Denison, Bailey oversaw 12 women's sports where she most notably served as head coach of the track and field team from 1981 to 1988 and was head coach of the women's soccer team during her entire tenure with the school. She was also an assistant professor at the university where she taught Psychology/Sociology of Sports, History of Sports, Ethics of Sports, Lifetime skills & Activity Classes.

From 1990 to 2005 Bailey served in the Athletic Administration at the University of Wisconsin. In 1990 Bailey was hired at the university as an associate athletic director for women's athletics. In the mid-1990s after the men's and women's athletic departments were combined at the university, Bailey was named the associate athletic director for sports administration. In 2001, as the lead administrator, Bailey was key in helping the university athletic department achieve gender equity compliance. Bailey served 3 years as the Badgers senior associate athletic director before resigning in 2005. During her 15 years at UW Bailey was the sports administrator for 22 different teams, including men's and women's soccer. Bailey served as chair of the NCAA Division 1 Basketball Committee from 2001 to 2004 and also served on the National Association of Collegiate Directors of Athletics Executive Committee.

== US Soccer ==
In 2007 Bailey was appointed as the general manager of the United States Women's National Soccer Team. She led the support staff for the US team during the 2007 and the 2011 FIFA Women's World cups and the 2008 Olympics. During her time with US Soccer, Bailey was in charge of all administrative areas pertaining to the Women's National Team including travel, payroll, liaising with clubs, and working with FIFA, CONCACAF and various other federations.

== National Women's Soccer League ==
On November 29, 2012 Sunil Gulati, President of the USSF, announced that Bailey was named as the executive director of the National Women's Soccer League. She oversaw the first two seasons of the league She stepped down after the 2014 season.

== Personal life ==
Bailey has a bachelor's degree from Slippery Rock State College in health and physical education and received her master's degree in physical education from Ohio State in 1983. Bailey's son, Kenneth James Marra, currently serves as the Director of Sales & Marketing in the College Sports Division at Intersport.
