= Jeff Plush =

American sports executive (born 1966/1967)

Jeff Plush (born 1966 or 1967) is the former CEO of the United States Curling Association (USA Curling) and former commissioner of the National Women's Soccer League.

== Career ==
Plush served as the Managing Director of the Colorado Rapids from 2006-2011, during which the team won its first MLS title (2010).

In 2014 Plush was named the commissioner of the National Women's Soccer League. He succeeded the inaugural commissioner, Cheryl Bailey.

In February 2017, Plush and A+E Networks announced the league's first season-long television deal, which included one match per week to be aired on Lifetime. The deal included A+E Networks taking a 25% equity stake in the league and forming a joint venture to manage and produce the league's broadcast and streaming content.

Plush resigned as commissioner in March 2017, and Amanda Duffy, hired by Plush to be the league's managing director of operations, filled many of the commissioner's roles until a successor was named several years later.

Plush was later hired in April 2017 by sports marketing company BHSC Global to form and lead its properties business group.

In February 2020 he became CEO of USA Curling, the national governing body of the sport of curling in the United States.

The end of Plush's tenure was steeped in controversy due to issues related to the handling of the sex abuse allegations at the NWSL as detailed in the Yates Report and subsequent lobbying by the USA Curling community. He resigned from USA Curling on October 28th, 2022.
