= Stacey Enos =

American soccer player (born 1964)

Personal information
- Full name: Stacey Elizabeth Enos
- Date of birth: February 4, 1964 (age 62)
- Place of birth: Tampa, Florida, United States
- Height: 5 ft 4 in (1.63 m)
- Position: Defender

College career
Years	Team	Apps	(Gls)
1982–1985	North Carolina Tar Heels	79	(16)

Senior career*
Years	Team	Apps	(Gls)
2001–2003	Asheville Splash		

International career
1985–1986	United States	10	(0)

Managerial career
- 1994–1995: Seattle Redhawks (assistant)
- 1996–2001: Utah State Aggies
- 2001–2017: Warren Wilson College
- 2001–2004: Highland Football Club (director)
- 2018: Asheville City SC
- * Club domestic league appearances and goals

Stacey Elizabeth Enos (born February 4, 1964) is an American former soccer player who played as a defender, making ten appearances for the United States women's national team.

== Career ==
In college, Enos played for the North Carolina Tar Heels from 1982 to 1985, where she was a letter-winner. With the team she won the first three NCAA national championship titles in 1982, 1983, and 1984. In 1984 she was included in the All-NCAA College Cup Selection, and in 1985 she was selected as an NSCAA Second-Team All-American. In total, she made 79 appearances for the Tar Heels, scoring 16 goals and registering 16 assists.

Enos made her international debut for the United States on August 18, 1985 in the team's inaugural match in the Mundialito against Italy. In total, she made ten appearances for the U.S., earning her final cap on July 26, 1986 in a friendly match against Italy.

In 2006 she was honored as a "Pioneer of the Game" by the North Carolina Soccer Hall of Fame. In 1994, Enos began working as an assistant coach with the Seattle Redhawks women's soccer team, before becoming the head coach of the Utah State Aggies in 1996. In 2001, she joined Warren Wilson College in Asheville, North Carolina to serve as the athletic director and head coach of the women's soccer team, where she remained until 2017. She also served as the director of a local youth team, Highland Football Club, from 2001 until 2004. In 2018, she served as the inaugural head coach of the Asheville City SC women's team in the WPSL, where she won the South Region Carolinas Conference Coach of the Year award.

== Personal life ==
Enos moved to North Carolina in 2001, and currently works as a real estate broker and serves on the Asheville Buncombe Sports Commission.

== Career statistics ==
=== International ===
United States
Year	Apps	Goals
1985	4	0
1986	6	0
Total	10	0
