= National Women's Soccer League =

Professional soccer league in the United States

- Founded: November 21, 2012; 14 years ago
- First season: 2013
- Country: United States
- Confederation: CONCACAF
- Number of clubs: 16
- Level on pyramid: 1
- Domestic cup: Arthur M. Blank Crest Cup
- League cup: NWSL Challenge Cup
- International cup: CONCACAF W Champions Cup
- Current champions: Kansas City Current (1st title) (2026)
- Current NWSL Shield: Gotham FC (1st shield) (2026)
- Most championships: Portland Thorns FC (3 titles)
- Most NWSL Shields: North Carolina Courage; Seattle Reign FC (3 shields each)
- Most appearances: Lauren Barnes (233) (as of March 28, 2025)
- Top scorer: Lynn Biyendolo (80) (as of March 28, 2025)
- Broadcasters: CBS Sports; ESPN/ABC; Prime Video; Scripps Sports; Roku
- Website: nwslsoccer.com
- Current: 2026 NWSL season

The National Women's Soccer League (NWSL) is a women's professional soccer league and the highest level of the United States soccer league system (alongside the USL Super League). The league comprises 16 teams. It is owned by the teams and sanctioned by the United States Soccer Federation. The NWSL is headquartered in New York City.

The NWSL was established in 2012 as the successor to Women's Professional Soccer (WPS; 2007–2012), which was itself the successor to the Women's United Soccer Association (WUSA; 2000–2003). The league began play in 2013 with eight teams, four of which were former members of WPS: Boston Breakers, Chicago Red Stars, Sky Blue FC, and Western New York Flash.

Through the 2026 season, eight teams (one now defunct) have been crowned NWSL Champions, awarded to the playoff winner, and seven teams (one defunct) have claimed the NWSL Shield, awarded to the team in first place at the end of the regular season. The current (2026) NWSL champions are Kansas City Current. The current (2026) NWSL Shield winners are Gotham FC.

== Competition format ==
As of 2024, the NWSL regular season runs from March to November, after which the team with the highest point total is awarded the NWSL Shield. Each team is scheduled for 26 regular-season games, 13 home and 13 away; in 2026, this became 30 games to accommodate the expanded 16-team league. This is followed by a playoff tournament culminating in the NWSL championship game in late November to crown the league champion. In 2024, a full quarterfinal round was introduced, so the eight teams with the most points from the regular season qualify for the playoffs.

From 2021 to 2023, the playoffs included six teams, with the top two teams receiving byes to the semi-finals. Prior to 2021, the playoffs included only four teams. The number of regular-season matches also fluctuated between 20 and 24 in past seasons.

The league also plays the NWSL Challenge Cup, which since 2024 is a single-game super cup between the current NWSL Shield holder and current NWSL Champion. The Challenge Cup originated in 2020 as a way for all teams to return to play after the pause from the COVID-19 pandemic (though one team had to drop out because of COVID). It continued featuring all teams, occurring in 2021 and 2022 as a preseason tournament and in 2023 running concurrently with the season, until 2024.

=== Other competitions ===
Since the 2023 season, three teams qualify for the CONCACAF W Champions Cup. These spots are the playoff champions, the Shield winners, and Shield runners-up. Gotham FC won the inaugural 2024–25 CONCACAF W Champions Cup.

All 14 NWSL teams also competed in the 2024 NWSL x Liga MX Femenil Summer Cup against six teams from the Mexican top division. Kansas City Current won the tournament.

On October 14, 2026, the USSF announced the establishment of the Arthur M. Blank Crest Cup planned to debut in 2028. This knockout cup competition will feature NWSL teams and USL Super League.

== History ==
=== Founding ===
After Women's Professional Soccer (WPS) officially folded in April 2012, the United States Soccer Federation (US Soccer) announced a roundtable for discussion of the future of women's professional soccer in the United States. The meeting, which included representatives from US Soccer, WPS teams, the W-League (ceased operation in 2015), and the Women's Premier Soccer League (WPSL), was held in June. By November, after much discussion, owners from the Chicago Red Stars, Boston Breakers and US Soccer recruited an additional six teams. Compared to WPS, the teams would intentionally operate at a lower cost structure and manage growth in a sustainable way.

In November 2012, it was announced that there would be eight teams in a new women's professional soccer league that was yet to be named at the time of the announcement, with national team players subsidized by US Soccer, the Canadian Soccer Association (CSA) and the Mexican Football Federation (FMF). The three federations would pay for the salaries of their national team players (24 from the US, 16 from Canada, and 12 to 16 from Mexico) to aid the teams in creating world-class rosters while staying under the salary cap. The players would be distributed evenly (as possible) among the eight teams in an allocation process. The teams would own the league, and the league would contract US Soccer to manage league operations. After the 2020 season, the league terminated its management contract with US Soccer.

On November 29, 2012, it was announced that Cheryl Bailey had been named executive director in the new league. Bailey had previously served as general manager of the United States women's national soccer team from 2007 to 2011, which included leading the support staff for the U.S. team during the 2007 and 2011 FIFA Women's World Cups, as well as the 2008 Summer Olympics. During her tenure with the women's national team, she was in charge of all areas of administration including interfacing with clubs, team travel, payroll, and working with FIFA, CONCACAF, and other federations.

The league name was announced in December 2012. Nike, Inc. was selected as league sponsor, providing apparel to all teams as well as the game ball.

=== Early years ===
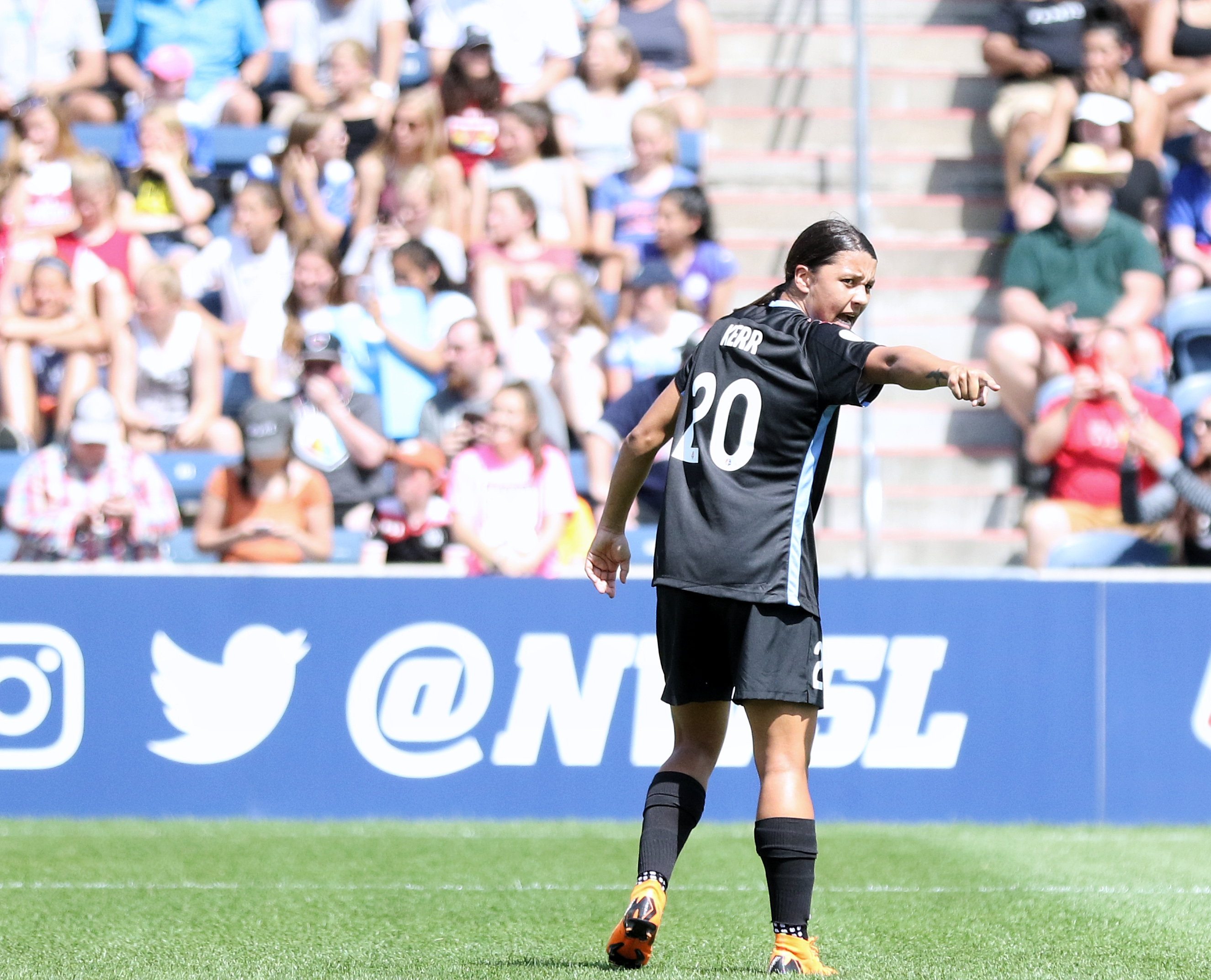
Sam Kerr during a Chicago Red Stars match, 2018. Kerr set records for goals scored in a single season and won multiple Golden Boot awards during her time with Sky Blue FC and the Chicago Red Stars.

The first NWSL game was held on April 13, 2013, as the Portland Thorns visited FC Kansas City, playing to a 1–1 draw in front of a crowd of 6,784 fans at Shawnee Mission District Stadium. Renae Cuellar scored the first goal in league history. The 2013 season saw regular-season attendance average of 4,270, with a high of 17,619 on August 4 for Kansas City at Portland.

The NWSL became the first U.S. professional women's soccer league to reach nine teams with the addition of Houston Dash, backed by Major League Soccer (MLS) team Houston Dynamo, in 2014; expansion interest, particularly from MLS and USL teams, has continued. The third season saw a shortened schedule and some early-season roster instability due to the 2015 FIFA Women's World Cup in Canada, but the World Cup also provided exposure to the NWSL, which was credited with boosting attendance numbers across the league.

The league also became the first professional women's league in the US to play more than three seasons when the league kicked off its fourth season in 2016.

=== Response to COVID-19 pandemic ===
The 2020 season was initially postponed due to the COVID-19 pandemic and later canceled. Instead the league played the 2020 NWSL Challenge Cup, a special competition hosted in the Salt Lake City region with no spectators. The cup began in late June, making the NWSL the first major U.S. team sports league to return to play. The league was the recipient of a federal loan through the Paycheck Protection Program, which it used to compensate players before the competition was able to begin. Later that year the league also played the NWSL Fall Series, a set of 18 games between teams within geographically restricted regions.

== Teams ==
=== Current teams ===
The NWSL teams are spread across the United States. Each club is allowed a minimum of 20 players on their roster, with a maximum of 22 players (26 when including supplemental players) allowed at any time during the season.

Originally, each team's roster included up to three allocated United States national team players, up to two allocated Mexico women's national team players, and up to two allocated Canadian national team players via the NWSL Player Allocation and subsequent trades. In addition, each team had four spots each season available for international players; these spots could be traded to other teams. The remaining roster spots were required to be filled by domestic players from the United States. Teams filled their rosters via a number of drafts and 4–6 discovery player signings. Mexico stopped allocating players to the NWSL, having established its own women's league in 2017, and the numbers of allocated players and international players on each team varied each year due to trades.

As of the 2022 season, the player allocation system was fully abolished. College and expansion drafts, as well as trades without player consent, were abolished as of the collective bargaining agreement between the league and NWSL Players Association during the 2024 season.

Of the 16 teams contesting the 2026 season:

- Four share primary ownership, facilities, and staff with men's Major League Soccer teams:
  - Houston Dash (Houston Dynamo FC)
  - Orlando Pride (Orlando City SC; also NFL team Minnesota Vikings)
  - Seattle Reign FC (Seattle Sounders FC)
  - Utah Royals (Real Salt Lake)
- Two share primary ownership, facilities, and staff with current or former men's teams of the United Soccer League:
  - North Carolina Courage (North Carolina FC, formerly of USL Championship and USL League One)
  - Racing Louisville FC (Louisville City FC of USL Championship)
- Three are part of multi-club ownership groups that also own women's soccer clubs in other leagues:
  - Bay FC is part of Bay Collective, a portfolio of women's soccer clubs owned by Sixth Street Partners that includes Sunderland A.F.C. Women
  - Kansas City Current is part of Ballard Capital, a portfolio of women's soccer clubs owned by Angie and Chris Long that includes HB Køge
  - Washington Spirit is part of Kynisca, a portfolio of women's soccer clubs owned by Michele Kang that includes OL Lyonnes and London City Lionesses
- Portland Thorns FC shares primary ownership, staff, and training facilities with the Portland Fire basketball team of the WNBA
- Six are operated independently of other clubs:
  - Angel City FC (with MLS club Los Angeles FC holding a minority stake)
  - Boston Legacy FC
  - Chicago Stars FC
  - Denver Summit FC
  - Gotham FC
  - San Diego Wave FC

Overview of National Women's Soccer League teams
Team	Location	Stadium (Note: Stadiums are those being used in the 2026 season.)	Founded	Joined	Head coach	Men's affiliate
Angel City FC	Los Angeles, California	BMO Stadium	2020	2022	Leif Gunnar Smerud(interim)	—N/a (Note: MLS club Los Angeles FC holds a minority stake in Angel City FC, acquired as part of its venue-sharing agreement, but does not share staff with or hold governance over the club.)
Bay FC	San Jose, California	PayPal Park	2023	2024	Emma Coates	—N/a
Boston Legacy FC	Foxborough, Massachusetts	Gillette Stadium (Note: Select matches are being played at Centreville Bank Stadium in Pawtucket, Rhode Island. The team will play its entire 2027 home schedule in Pawtucket.)	2023	2026	Filipa Santos Patão	—N/a
Chicago Stars FC (Note: Known as Chicago Red Stars until 2024.)	Evanston, Illinois	Martin Stadium	2006	2013	Karina Báez (interim)	—N/a
Denver Summit FC	Centennial, Colorado	Centennial Stadium (Note: Due to construction delays, Centennial Stadium did not open until July 18, 2026. Before then, Denver Summit played at the following Denver-area venues: The first home game was at Empower Field at Mile High in Denver proper.; Subsequent home games were at Dick's Sporting Goods Park in Commerce City.)	2025	2026	Nick Cushing	—N/a
Gotham FC (Note: Known as Sky Blue FC until 2020 and NJ/NY Gotham FC from 2021 to 2024.)	Harrison, New Jersey	Sports Illustrated Stadium	2007	2013	Juan Carlos Amorós	—N/a
Houston Dash	Houston, Texas	Shell Energy Stadium	2013	2014	Jaime Frías (interim)	Houston Dynamo FC (MLS)
Kansas City Current (Note: Known as Kansas City NWSL in 2021.)	Kansas City, Missouri	CPKC Stadium	2020	2021	Chris Armas	—N/a
North Carolina Courage	Cary, North Carolina	WakeMed Soccer Park	2017	2017	Mak Lind	North Carolina FC (inactive; formerly USLC and USL1)
Orlando Pride	Orlando, Florida	Inter.co Stadium	2015	2016	Yolanda Thomas (interim)	Orlando City SC (MLS)
Portland Thorns FC	Portland, Oregon	Providence Park	2012	2013	Robert Vilahamn	—N/a (Note: From their founding in 2012 until their sale in 2024, the Thorns were affiliated with the Portland Timbers of Major League Soccer.)
Racing Louisville FC	Louisville, Kentucky	Lynn Family Stadium	2019	2021	Bev Yanez	Louisville City FC (USLC)
San Diego Wave FC	San Diego, California	Snapdragon Stadium	2021	2022	Jonas Eidevall	—N/a
Seattle Reign FC (Note: Known as Reign FC in 2019 and OL Reign from 2020 to 2023.)	Seattle, Washington	Lumen Field	2012	2013	Laura Harvey	Seattle Sounders FC (MLS)
Utah Royals (Note: Known as Utah Royals FC from 2018 to 2020.)	Sandy, Utah	America First Field	2017	2024 (Note: Utah Royals FC initially joined the league in 2018 and played three seasons before ceasing operations at the end of 2020.)	Jimmy Coenraets	Real Salt Lake (MLS)
Washington Spirit	Washington, D.C.	Audi Field	2012	2013	Adrián González	—N/a

=== Future teams ===
Overview of planned National Women's Soccer League teams
Team	Location	Stadium	Founded	Joining	Head coach	Men's affiliate
Atlanta City FC	Atlanta, Georgia	Mercedes-Benz Stadium	2025	2028	TBA	Atlanta United FC (MLS)
Columbus NWSL team	Columbus, Ohio	ScottsMiracle-Gro Field	2026	2028	TBA	Columbus Crew (MLS)

=== Former teams ===
Overview of former and defunct National Women's Soccer League teams
Team	Location	Stadium (Note: Stadiums are those used in their last NWSL season.)	Founded	Joined	Last NWSL season
Boston Breakers	Boston, Massachusetts	Jordan Field	2007	2013	2017
FC Kansas City	Kansas City, Missouri	Swope Soccer Village	2012	2013	2017
Western New York Flash	Rochester, New York	Sahlen's Stadium	2008	2013	2016

=== Membership timeline ===
Current team Defunct team Former team Future team

==== Notes ====
a. North Carolina Courage are officially an expansion team that was awarded the roster and draft assets of the former Western New York Flash. The Flash's 2013 NWSL Shield, 2016 NWSL championship, and records remained with the Flash, which subsequently fielded a new team in the United Women's Soccer league. Although the Courage share a name and mascot with the Women's United Soccer Association's (WUSA) Carolina Courage, it is not considered a continuation of the WUSA Courage and do not share its trophies or records.

b. Kansas City Current (formerly Kansas City NWSL) are officially an expansion team awarded the roster and draft assets of the former Utah Royals FC, including assets that had previously been transferred from the former FC Kansas City to Utah. However, they are not considered a resumption of the former FC Kansas City. Neither FC Kansas City's 2014 and 2015 NWSL championships and records, nor Utah Royals FC's records, were transferred to the Current.

c. After the 2018 Utah Royals FC folded in 2020, Real Salt Lake retained the right to a future NWSL expansion bid at a grandfathered fee should new ownership pursue a continuation of the team. Although the 2024 Utah Royals are thus considered a continuation of the 2018 Utah Royals FC and retain that iteration's records, they were not awarded any rights to their former iteration's roster upon their continuation and participated in the 2024 NWSL Expansion Draft.

d. Boston Legacy FC are officially an expansion team and are not considered a continuation of the former Boston Breakers.

=== Expansion ===
Soon after launch, the league reportedly planned to expand to ten teams for 2014. Potential candidates included groups not accepted as part of the original eight; groups from the Los Angeles area (joint effort from the LA Strikers and Pali Blues) and from Hartford, Connecticut, were confirmed failed bids, as was one from the Seattle Sounders Women. There was speculation that the Vancouver Whitecaps Women could be logical candidates especially given the 2015 FIFA Women's World Cup in Canada; however, the Whitecaps shuttered their women's program (except for one U-18 academy team) in December 2012.

During the inaugural season, there were rumors of expansion interest from MLS teams Toronto FC, Vancouver Whitecaps FC, and the New York Red Bulls, as well as confirmed interest from WPSL side the Houston Aces. NWSL team owners hinted that expansion for 2014 was not a question of "if" but "how many". Despite this, it was announced during the playoffs that there would be no expansion for the league's second season, though the Red Bulls and Sky Blue FC confirmed that they were in discussions for cooperation.

During the first offseason, the Houston Dynamo added their name to the list of MLS teams interested in fielding a women's side, stating that they were "exploring the opportunity" of starting an NWSL side in 2014 or '15, and in 2013 they announced the Houston Dash with 2014 as their inaugural season. By early December, NWSL approved a new team run by the Dynamo organization for expansion in 2014, despite their earlier statement that there would be no expansion for the league's second season.

During the second offseason, expansion talk grew rapidly, with three established men's teams (Real Salt Lake of MLS, the Indy Eleven of NASL, and the Pittsburgh Riverhounds of USL Pro) expressing interest in joining NWSL, as well as an unattached group from Atlanta. There was also rumored or suggested interest from three men's teams in California, though none of those groups made official statements. Despite this interest, it was announced in late April 2015 that there would be no expansion for the 2016 season.

However, after the well-publicized success of the US Women's National soccer team, renewed interest in NWSL expansion caused reports from the owners' meeting that "a new team in 2016 has not been ruled out", with potential expansion news to be revealed within a month. Commissioner Jeff Plush said that over a dozen interested groups had contacted the league in the post-World-Cup weeks; MLS team Orlando City SC was one of the first newly interested groups made public. On October 20, 2015, it was announced that Orlando would be hosting the 10th NWSL team, the Orlando Pride, due to start the 2016 season. At that announcement, the Pride announced that they had hired former U.S. National Women's Team coach Tom Sermanni.

On November 16, 2017, it was announced that Real Salt Lake would expand into the NWSL beginning in the 2018 season. The Salt Lake City team, shortly thereafter unveiled as Utah Royals FC, is officially considered a new franchise that replaced FC Kansas City.

The NWSL announced on October 22, 2019, that a team in Louisville, Kentucky, affiliated with the city's USL Championship side Louisville City FC, would join the league in 2021. The team was originally to be named Proof Louisville FC, but after significant disapproval from fans it was announced that the Proof Louisville FC branding would not necessarily be the final selection, and that the process to determine the team's identity would be restarted. On July 8, 2020, the Louisville team was rebranded as Racing Louisville FC, and its associated visual identity was announced on the same day. Racing plays in Lynn Family Stadium, which opened in 2020 as the new home of Louisville City.

On July 21, 2020, the NWSL announced that a Los Angeles–based team will begin play in 2022. The team's ownership group, who call themselves "Angel City", is led by president and founder Julie Uhrman, a media and gaming entrepreneur; co-founders Natalie Portman, an Oscar-winning actress, and venture capitalist Kara Nortman; venture capitalist Alexis Ohanian as lead founding investor; and additional investors including fourteen former USWNT members, most with ties to Southern California; actresses Uzo Aduba, Jessica Chastain, America Ferrera, Jennifer Garner, and Eva Longoria; talk show host Lilly Singh; and Ohanian's wife, tennis great Serena Williams. In 2022, the Los Angeles NWSL team became the first American professional sports team founded by a majority-woman ownership group to begin play, and co-founders Portman, Nortman, and Uhrman have publicly discussed their ownership stakes extensively as one way to address gender inequity in sports and to encourage additional investment by women into women's sports. On October 21, 2020, the ownership group announced that the expansion club would be called Angel City FC and announced more group members, among them tennis great Billie Jean King, WNBA star Candace Parker, alpine skiing great Lindsey Vonn and her fiancé at the time, NHL star P. K. Subban, actress and activist Sophia Bush, Latin music pop star Becky G, actor and TV host James Corden, and former US men's soccer international Cobi Jones.

On December 7, 2020, the NWSL announced that an expansion team in Kansas City would join the league in 2021 and take over player-related assets from Utah Royals FC. The Royals ceased operations at the same time, but the new owners of Utah Soccer LLC (after Dell Loy Hansen completes the sale) would have the option of re-establishing the Royals franchise in 2023. The team played under the placeholder name of Kansas City NWSL in the 2021 season, announcing its permanent identity of Kansas City Current immediately before its final home game of that season on October 30.

On January 12, 2021, then-NWSL commissioner Lisa Baird shared in a press conference that an expansion team in Sacramento would join the league in 2022, but that the team ownership would make the official announcement in due course. A team announcement never materialized, however. In May 2021, it was reported that the ownership group behind the Sacramento expansion would be seeking NWSL approval to move its expansion rights to San Diego instead. On June 8, 2021, the NWSL officially announced a San Diego expansion team, ultimately named San Diego Wave FC, with former United States women's national soccer team head coach Jill Ellis as president.

In late 2022, it was reported the likely 13th expansion club would be in Utah, as the new Real Salt Lake ownership had the rights to an approximately $2 million expansion franchise fee to bring back the Utah Royals to the Salt Lake City area. In addition the three finalists for the 14th expansion club were a group from the San Francisco Bay Area, Tampa, and Boston. It is thought these teams would join for the 2024 season. The highest bid was reported to be $40 million. On January 27, 2023, it was reported that the NWSL would expand to Utah, San Francisco and Boston. The owners in Utah would pay $2–5 million, while the groups in San Francisco and Boston would pay $50 million. Utah and San Francisco would join the NWSL in 2024 and Boston would join the NWSL later. On March 11, 2023, it was confirmed that the Utah team would join in 2024, inheriting the Utah Royals FC name and history.

League commissioner Jessica Berman announced on November 22, 2024, that Cincinnati, Cleveland, and Denver were finalists for the 16th franchise, which is set to join the league in 2026 alongside Boston. The league decided in January 2025 that Denver would receive the franchise.

== Organization ==
=== Stadiums and attendance ===
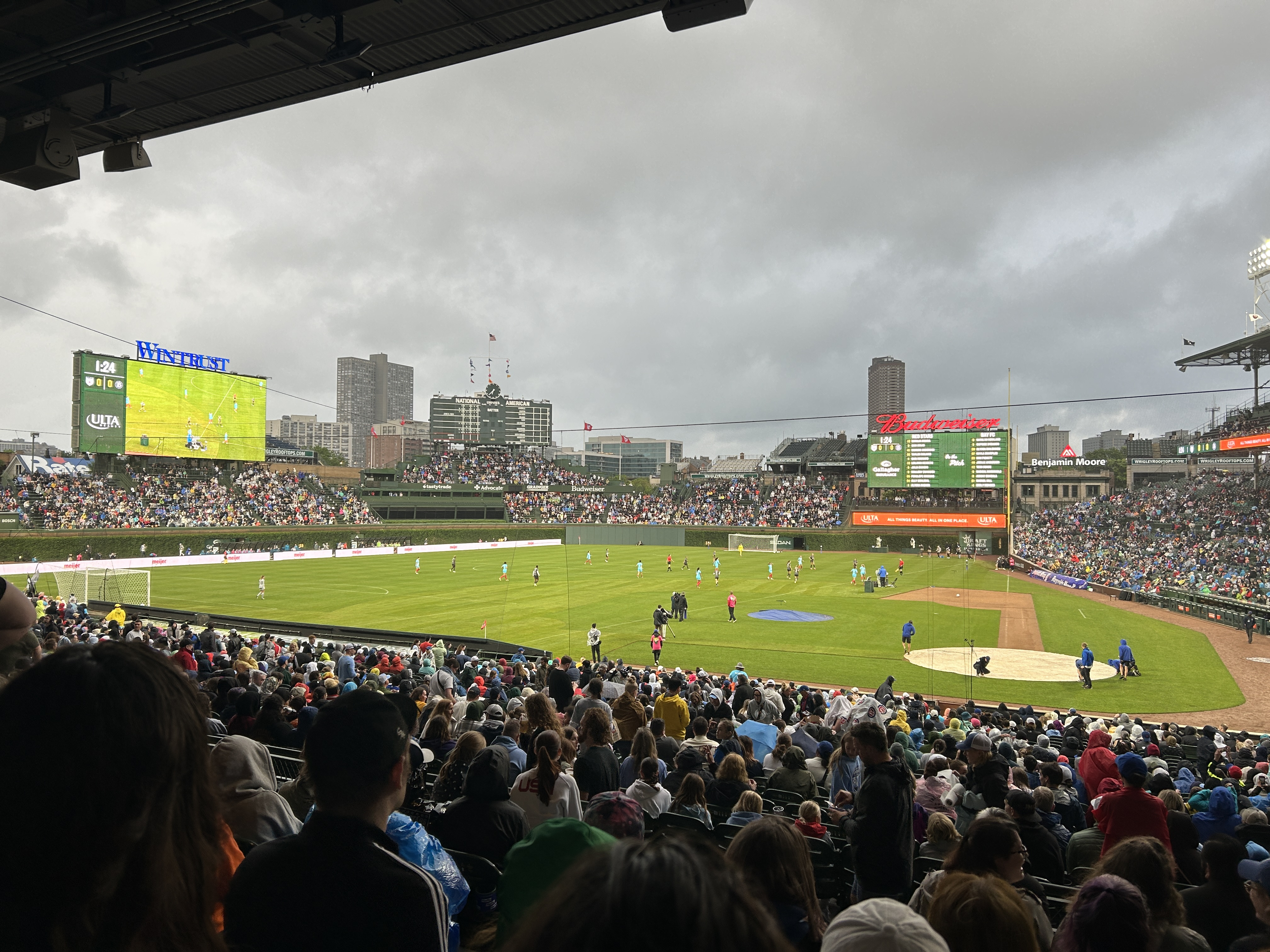
A Chicago Red Stars and Bay FC match at Wrigley Field set a single-game attendance record of 35,038.

In the 2025 season, every NWSL team will use one stadium as its primary home venue.

The highest single-game attendance in the league's history was on August 23, 2025, for a game between Bay FC and the Washington Spirit at Oracle Park which drew 40,091. This broke the league previous single-game attendance record of 35,038 from a June 8, 2024 game between the Chicago Red Stars and Bay FC at Wrigley Field.

The 2025 playoffs drew a league-record total attendance of 114,459 across seven matches, an increase of 11% from the 2024 postseason.

On June 3, 2023, a double-header featuring Seattle Reign FC and Portland Thorns FC alongside a Major League Soccer matchup between the Seattle Sounders and Portland Timbers drew an announced attendance of 42,054.

In 2024, the NWSL reached a historic milestone of 2 million match attendees for the first time in league history.

In 2025, multiple teams set attendance records for their home openers, including the NC Courage.

=== Squad formation and salaries ===
In each season, teams receive a salary cap that limits their total spending on players. Before the 2022 season, salaries of federation players were paid for completely or mostly by their respective national federations, and they counted against the salary cap at a pre-determined amount—$33,000 for U.S. players, and $27,500 or the actual salary for Canadian players, whichever is lower. Non-federation players are subject to minimum and maximum salary limits.

Each team provides fully paid healthcare for its players, and also provides housing, either directly or through a stipend of no more than $3,000 per month. In addition, teams are allowed to provide their players with the use of a car valued at no more than $50,000. These expenses are specifically excluded from cap calculations.

In 2019, the maximum senior roster size was expanded to 22 and the minimum to 20, with an additional four supplemental spots for players earning minimum salary that do not count against the salary cap. As of 2021, the minimum senior roster size is 22 and the maximum 24, so each team could carry a maximum total of 28 players on its active roster.

The NWSL introduced significant changes to its compensation guidelines before the 2020 season. In addition to a sizable increase in the salary cap and the salary limits for unallocated players, teams now can purchase up to $300,000 in "allocation money" in excess of the salary cap to invest in qualified current or future players; allocation money can be traded. Multi-year contracts (up to three years plus one option year) are now permitted, year-round housing becomes mandatory, and the cap for permitted team assistance has been removed. When originally announced, allocation money could not be used to supplement the salaries of U.S. or Canadian federation players, and players could not refuse federation status to access allocation money. The allocation rules were quietly changed in advance of the 2020 season to allow players to refuse federation status, but this change did not become public knowledge until after the end of the abbreviated season. In the 2021 season, clubs were explicitly allowed to use allocation money to sign federation players. In 2021, salary for unallocated players and the team salary cap both increased between 5 and 10 percent.

On December 13, 2021, as part of negotiations between U.S. Soccer and the union representing USWNT players, both agreed to end the allocation system for USWNT members, effective with the 2022 season. Starting in that season, the club salaries of all USWNT players will be paid directly by their NWSL clubs, and these players will be represented in their club employment by the NWSL Players Association (NWSLPA).

The NWSL and the NWSLPA, the union representing all players in the NWSL, jointly announced on January 31, 2022, that they had entered into the league's first official collective bargaining agreement, which was intended to run through the 2026 season. Under this agreement, the minimum player salary increased to $35,000 in the 2022 season. Free agency was formally added; players with six seasons of NWSL service would become unrestricted free agents in 2023, with the required service time reduced to five seasons from 2024. Additionally, starting in 2024, players with three seasons of NWSL service received restricted free agency. Also, should the league become profitable in any season from 2024 to 2026, the players were to receive 10 percent of the league's broadcast revenues in the applicable season.

On August 25, 2022, the NWSLPA filed a grievance against the NWSL after the league announced the omission of 22 players from a list of 26 who would become eligible to negotiate free-agent contracts for the 2023 season. The league contended that the contracts of the 22 omitted players included one or more option years that each player's club must first decline to exercise by the deadline of November 15 before the player would be eligible for free agency. The players association contended that the contracts expired on their expiration date, and not the option exercise deadline. The players association expected the league to deny the grievance, and for the dispute to enter arbitration.

In March 2024 Sophia Smith, now Sophia Wilson, was signed by the Portland Thorns to a two-year contract extension that made her the highest-paid player in the NWSL, but her salary was not disclosed.

Later in 2024, the league and the NWSLPA entered into a new CBA, running through the 2030 season, that ESPN journalist Jeff Kassouf called "radical by American sports standards". The new CBA eliminated all forms of player drafts—both entry drafts and expansion drafts—thus setting the NWSL apart from all of the major men's leagues and the WNBA. Also, once a player's contract expires, she is free to sign with any team worldwide, regardless of years of service. The league's "discovery rule", which allowed teams to claim NWSL "rights" to negotiate with players at random, was also eliminated. Minimum player salaries were increased to $48,500 for 2025 (more than $9,000 above what the 2021 CBA would have allowed) and will further increase to $82,500 by 2030. The new CBA fixes team salary caps for each year in advance, replacing the old system of announcing each season's cap during the prior offseason. The cap was set at $3.3 million in 2025, increasing to $5.1 million by 2030. The largest cap increase in this period will be between 2026 and 2027 ($3.5 million to $4.4 million), coinciding with the U.S. cohosting the 2026 FIFA World Cup. Depending on league media and sponsorship revenue, the figures set forth in the CBA may be increased. The use of charter flights for team travel was modestly increased, and player health benefits were significantly expanded. Perhaps most significantly, the new CBA removed language that effectively enshrined the NWSL's current spring-to-fall calendar, giving the league the option to change to the fall-to-spring calendar used by most European leagues. Any change to the season calendar will require one year's notice.

Salaries in the National Women's Soccer League
Season	Salary cap	Salary limits (for players ineligible for allocation money)		Allocation money
Season	Salary cap	Minimum	Maximum	Allocation money
2013	$200,000	$6,000	$30,000	N/A
2014	$265,000	$6,600	$31,500	N/A
2015	$265,000	$6,842	$37,800	N/A
2016	$278,000	$7,200	$39,700	N/A
2017	$315,000	$15,000	$41,700	N/A
2018	$350,000	$15,750	$44,000	N/A
2019	$421,500	$16,538	$46,200	N/A
2020	$650,000	$20,000	$50,000	$300,000
2021	$682,500	$22,000	$52,500	$400,000
2022	$1,100,000	$35,000	$75,000	$500,000
2023	$1,375,000	$36,400	$200,000 (Note: The league's definition changed from maximum salary to "cap charge" in 2023, defined as "adding the Player's base salary to any additional compensation" in the player's contract, "which includes performance bonus, roster bonus, agent fees, and excess benefits and/or excess Permitted Team Assistance costs".)	$600,000
2024	$2,750,000	$37,856	none	N/A
2025	$3,300,000	$48,500	none	N/A
2026	$3,700,000	$50,500	none	N/A

All currency amounts are in United States dollars.

=== Players' union ===
Active non-United States federation players, including unpaid amateur players, announced their formation of the NWSL Players Association (NWSLPA) on May 15, 2017, as the first step toward forming a union. The NWSL recognized the NWSLPA as the players' union on November 15, 2018. As of February 2022, the NWSLPA is led by civil rights attorney and former WPS players' union organizer Meghann Burke.

Prior to the 2022 season, the NWSLPA membership did not include United States federation players because those players were contracted to the US Soccer Federation for their NWSL play. With the abolition of the federation player system for 2022 and beyond, the NWSLPA now represents all players in the NWSL. The league and the NWSLPA entered into their first collective bargaining agreement in advance of that season.

== League competitions ==
=== Championship and Shield ===
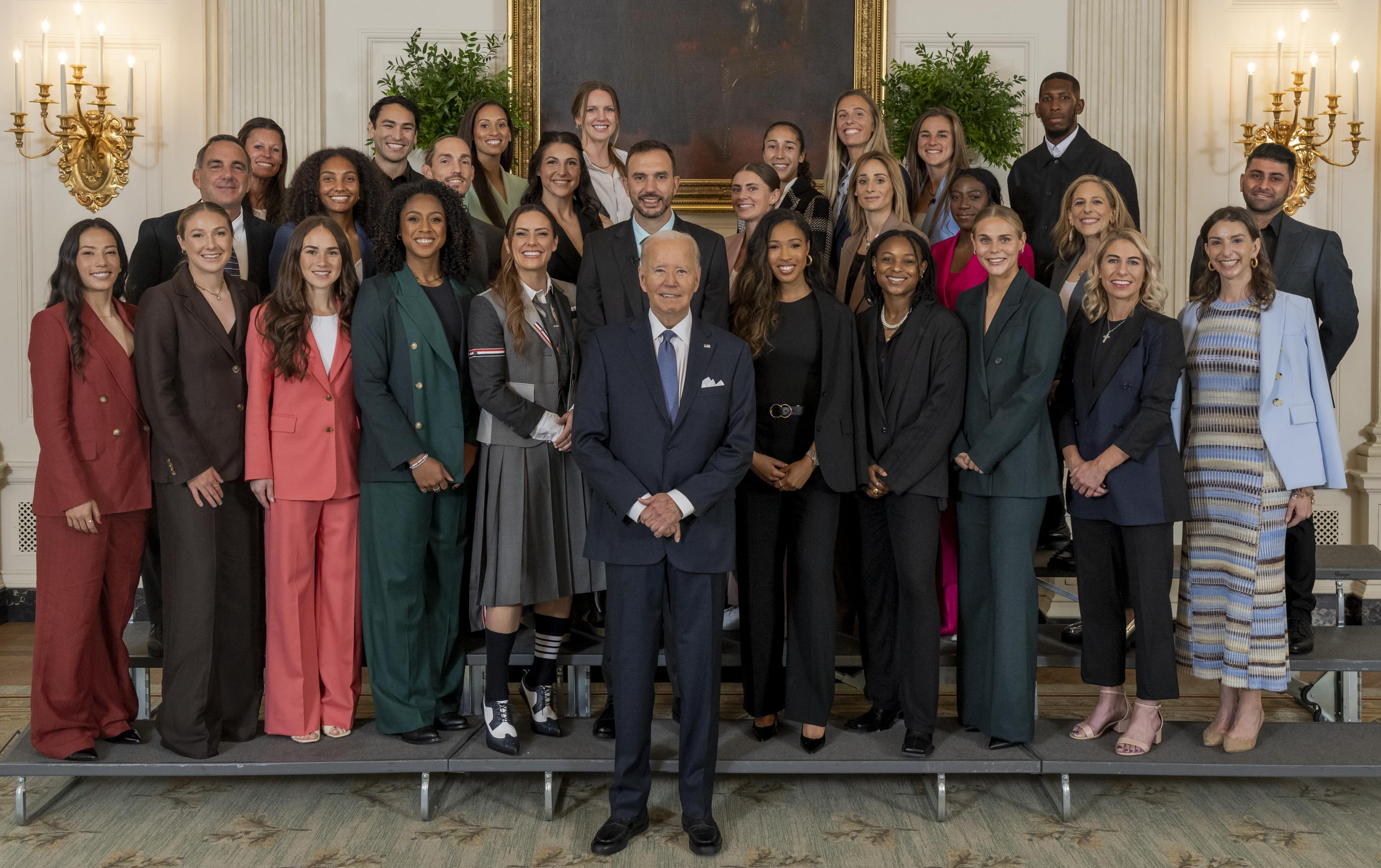
President Joe Biden with members of NJ/NY Gotham FC at the White House to celebrate their 2023 championship

The winner of the NWSL Championship, the final match of the NWSL playoffs, determines that season's NWSL champion. In addition to receiving the championship trophy, the champion gets to add a star to the crest on its jersey. The playoffs, a single-elimination knockout tournament, are organized by the league in a format similar to other North American professional sports leagues. At the conclusion of the regular season, the top eight teams in the standings earn a berth to the tournament; from 2021 to 2024, the top six teams qualified for the playoffs, and prior to 2021 the top four teams qualified. The league also awards the NWSL Shield to the team with the best record (most points) at the end of the regular season. Like the playoff championship, it is recognized as a major trophy by the league.

The first NWSL Championship was played on September 1, 2013. As of November 2025, six teams have been crowned NWSL Champions: Portland Thorns FC (3), Gotham FC (2), FC Kansas City (2), North Carolina Courage (2), Washington Spirit (1), and Western New York Flash (1). Seven teams have claimed the NWSL Shield: North Carolina Courage (3), Seattle Reign FC (3), Portland Thorns FC (2), Kansas City Current (1), Orlando Pride (1), San Diego Wave FC (1), and Western New York Flash (1). The Reign was the first team to repeat as Shield winners in 2014 and 2015. FC Kansas City was the first team to win consecutive championships, also in 2014–15, both times defeating the Reign. In 2018, the North Carolina Courage became the first team to win both the NWSL Shield and the NWSL Championship in the same season, a feat they repeated in 2019 and the Orlando Pride achieved in 2024.

The trophies won by FC Kansas City and Western New York officially remain with those teams and were not transferred to the expansion or successor teams in Utah and North Carolina that were assigned their player-related assets. This was a non-issue for Utah Royals FC, which won no trophies before folding and having its player-related assets transferred to the franchise now known as the Kansas City Current.

Overview of National Women's Soccer League champions
Season	NWSL Champions Playoff winners	NWSL Shield Regular-season winners	Championship location	Championship attendance
2013	Portland Thorns FC	Western New York Flash	Sahlen's Stadium, Rochester, New York	9,129
2014	FC Kansas City	Seattle Reign FC	Starfire Sports Complex, Tukwila, Washington	4,252
2015	FC Kansas City (2)	Seattle Reign FC (2)	Providence Park, Portland, Oregon	13,264
2016	Western New York Flash	Portland Thorns FC	BBVA Compass Stadium, Houston, Texas	8,255
2017	Portland Thorns FC (2)	North Carolina Courage	Orlando City Stadium, Orlando, Florida	8,124
2018	North Carolina Courage	North Carolina Courage (2)	Providence Park, Portland, Oregon	21,144^{†}
2019	North Carolina Courage (2)	North Carolina Courage (3)	Sahlen's Stadium, Cary, North Carolina	10,227^{†}
2020	Canceled			
2021	Washington Spirit	Portland Thorns (2)	Lynn Family Stadium, Louisville, Kentucky	10,360
2022	Portland Thorns FC (3)	OL Reign (3)	Audi Field, Washington, D.C.	17,624
2023	NJ/NY Gotham FC	San Diego Wave FC	Snapdragon Stadium, San Diego, California	25,011
2024	Orlando Pride	Orlando Pride	CPKC Stadium, Kansas City, Missouri	11,500^{†}
2025	Gotham FC (2)	Kansas City Current	PayPal Park, San Jose, California	18,000
2026	Kansas City Current	Gotham FC	Audi Field, Washington, D.C	20,000

^{†} sellout

==== Championship records ====
Italics indicates a defunct team.

Club	Won	Runner-up	Years won	Years runner-up
Portland Thorns FC	3	1	2013, 2017, 2022	2018
North Carolina Courage	2	1	2018, 2019	2017
FC Kansas City	2	0	2014, 2015	
Gotham FC (Note: Gotham FC was previously known as NJ/NY Gotham FC.)	2	0	2023, 2025	
Washington Spirit	1	3	2021	2016, 2024, 2025
Western New York Flash	1	1	2016	2013
Orlando Pride	1	0	2024	
Seattle Reign FC (Note: Seattle Reign FC was previously known as Reign FC and OL Reign.)	0	3		2014, 2015, 2023
Chicago Stars FC (Note: Chicago Stars FC was previously known as Chicago Red Stars.)	0	2		2019, 2021
Kansas City Current	0	1		2022

==== Shield records ====
Italics indicates a defunct team.

Team	Wins	Years won
North Carolina Courage	3	2017, 2018, 2019
Seattle Reign FC	3	2014, 2015, 2022
Portland Thorns FC	2	2016, 2021
Gotham FC	1	2026
Kansas City Current	1	2025
Orlando Pride	1	2024
San Diego Wave FC	1	2023
Western New York Flash	1	2013

=== Challenge Cup ===
In 2020, the COVID-19 pandemic prevented the regular season from starting. Instead the league played the newly announced Challenge Cup, a tournament-style competition starting in late June, with all teams in a protective bubble in Salt Lake City. This made the NWSL the first professional team sport in the U.S. to restart during the pandemic. The Houston Dash won the inaugural Challenge Cup, topping the Chicago Red Stars in the final.

In November 2020, the NWSL announced that the Challenge Cup would become an annual league cup competition. The 2021 Challenge Cup was played in April and May prior to the regular season, with the Portland Thorns FC emerging as victors over NJ/NY Gotham FC in the final. The 2022 Challenge Cup was played from March to May of that year and was won by the North Carolina Courage. The 2023 NWSL Challenge Cup was played concurrently with the NWSL season, and the North Carolina Courage won their second straight NWSL Challenge Cup.

In 2024, the Challenge Cup became a single-game super cup contested by the previous season's NWSL Shield holder and NWSL Championship winner. Should the same team win both trophies, the Challenge Cup would be a rematch of the previous season's championship game (which happened for the first time in the 2025 edition). The 2023 NWSL Shield winners San Diego Wave FC defeated the 2023 NWSL Champions NJ/NY Gotham FC to win the 2024 Challenge Cup, the first under the current format. In 2025, the 2024 Champions and Shield winners Orlando Pride faced off against the championship runner-up Washington Spirit, with Washington prevailing on penalties. The most recent 2026 edition, played on June 26, saw 2025 champions Gotham FC defeat Shield winners Kansas City Current.

Overview of Challenge Cup champions
Season	Format	Champions	Runners-up	Final location
2020	whole-league tournament (Note: The Orlando Pride did not participate because of positive tests for COVID-19 among players.)	Houston Dash	Chicago Red Stars	Rio Tinto Stadium, Sandy, Utah
2021	whole-league tournament	Portland Thorns FC	NJ/NY Gotham FC	Providence Park, Portland, Oregon
2022	whole-league tournament	North Carolina Courage	Washington Spirit	Sahlen's Stadium, Cary, North Carolina
2023	whole-league tournament	North Carolina Courage (2)	Racing Louisville FC	WakeMed Soccer Park, Cary, North Carolina
2024	2-team supercup	San Diego Wave FC	NJ/NY Gotham FC (2)	Red Bull Arena, Harrison, New Jersey
2025	2-team supercup	Washington Spirit	Orlando Pride	Inter&Co Stadium, Orlando, Florida
2026	2-team supercup	Gotham FC	Kansas City Current	ScottsMiracle-Gro Field, Columbus, Ohio

=== Planned second division ===
On April 1, 2025, the NWSL applied to U.S. Soccer to create a new Division II league, confirming this to media outlets on April 25. At the time, the U.S. soccer system had no Division II women's league, but a separate organization has applied for Division II sanctioning for WPSL PRO, set to launch in 2026. If sanctioned, the as-of-yet unnamed second division intends to launch in 2026 with reserve sides of eight current NWSL teams—Bay FC, Kansas City Current, North Carolina Courage, NJ/NY Gotham FC, Orlando Pride, Racing Louisville FC, Seattle Reign FC, and the Washington Spirit. All 14 current NWSL sides, plus the two 2026 expansion teams, are expected to field reserve sides in the new second division within that league's first four years, and teams without NWSL affiliations will also be welcome at some point.

=== Fall Series ===
In September and October 2020, the league played the Fall Series, in which the nine teams were divided into three geographic "pods" to minimize travel during the COVID-19 pandemic; each team played a home-and-away round-robin within its pod. The Portland Thorns earned 12 points, the maximum possible, and won the Fall Series and the associated trophy, the Community Shield (named Verizon Community Shield for sponsorship reasons).

== Broadcasting ==
The NWSL's current American media coverage is held by CBS Sports, ESPN/ABC, Amazon Prime Video, Ion Television, The Roku Channel and the league ran NWSL+ streaming service.

- CBS Sports Network will air 20 regular season matches, while five other regular season matches can air on any CBS Sports platform, which could include the traditional CBS network, Paramount+, and the CBS Sports Golazo Network.
- ESPN will expand its agreement to air 33 regular season matches, including all 8 Decision Day matches, two quarter-finals, and one semi-final on ESPN, ESPN2, or ABC, and streaming on ESPN+.
- Prime Video will stream the season opening match, 25 regular season matches on Friday nights, and one quarter-final.
- Ion Television will air 50 regular season matches per-season, consisting of primetime doubleheaders on Saturday nights.
- The Roku Channel will air 8 Sunday night matches in 2026 and 25 matches in 2027.
- The remaining matches not covered by these contracts are streamed for free on the league-run NWSL+ streaming service. Individual teams also have the option to sell non-exclusive rights to these matches to local broadcasters (such as broadcast stations and regional sports networks).

OneSoccer announced on February 5, 2026 that they had acquired rights to broadcast the NWSL in Canada beginning with the 2026 season.

== Statistical leaders ==
Bold indicates active NWSL players.

**NWSL all-time leading goalscorers** Regular season only as of February 24, 2026
Rank	Player	Goals
1	(Australia) **Sam Kerr**	77
2	(United States) **Lynn Biyendolo**	70
3	(Canada) Christine Sinclair	66
4	(United States) Alex Morgan	60
5	(United States) **Ashley Hatch**	59
6	(Brazil) **Debinha**	55
7	(United States) Jessica McDonald	54
8	(United States) Megan Rapinoe	51
9	(United States) Christen Press	49
10	(Wales) **Jess Fishlock**	48
10	(United States) **Sydney Leroux**	48

**NWSL all-time most appearances** Regular season only as of February 24, 2026
Rank	Player	Games
1	(United States) Lauren Barnes	252
2	(United States) McCall Zerboni	217
3	(Wales) **Jess Fishlock**	215
4	(United States) **Danielle Colaprico**	214
5	(United States) **Vanessa DiBernardo**	202
6	(Canada) Christine Sinclair	200
7	(United States) **Caprice Dydasco**	196
7	(United States) Merritt Mathias	196
7	(United States) Jasmyne Spencer	196
7	(United States) **Arin Wright**	196

NWSL all-time most assists Regular season only as of February 24, 2026
Rank	Player	Assists
1	**(United States) Sofia Huerta**	32
2	(United States) **Lynn Biyendolo**	31
2	**(United States) Vanessa DiBernardo**	31
2	(United States) Jess McDonald	31
5	(Wales) **Jess Fishlock**	30
6	(United States) Alex Morgan	28
7	(Brazil) **Debinha**	26
7	(United States) Crystal Dunn	26
7	(Japan) Nahomi Kawasumi	26
7	(United States) Megan Rapinoe	26

NWSL all-time most shutouts Regular season only as of December 31, 2023
#	Player	Shutouts	Apps
1	(United States) Nicole Barnhart	52	144
2	(United States) **Alyssa Naeher**	43	163
3	(United States) **Adrianna Franch**	42	127
4	(United States) **Casey Murphy**	32	80
5	**(Canada) Kailen Sheridan**	31	117
6	(United States) **Jane Campbell**	30	103
6	(United States) **Aubrey Kingsbury**	30	119
8	**(United States) Bella Bixby**	24	57
9	(United States) Ashlyn Harris	22	135
10	(United States) Katelyn Rowland	20	60

== Awards ==
Throughout the season, the league awards Player of the Month, Team of the Month, and Player of the Week awards to individual players, which are voted on by the media. At the end of each season, the league presents seven annual awards for outstanding achievements, six of which are voted on by players, owners, general managers, coaches, media, and fans. The 2025 holders of the annual awards were as follows:

- Golden Boot: Temwa Chawinga, Kansas City Current (15 goals)
- Most Valuable Player: Temwa Chawinga, Kansas City Current
- Rookie of the Year: Lilly Reale, Gotham FC
- Goalkeeper of the Year: Lorena, Kansas City Current
- Defender of the Year: Tara McKeown, Washington Spirit
- Midfielder of the Year: Manaka Matsukubo, North Carolina Courage
- Coach of the Year: Bev Yanez, Racing Louisville FC

In addition, the league names an annual NWSL Best XI team and NWSL Second XI team, which are voted on by players, owners, general managers, coaches, media, and fans.

== Leadership ==
Name	Years	Title	Ref.
Cheryl Bailey	2012–2014	Commissioner	
Jeff Plush	2015–2017	Commissioner	
Amanda Duffy	2017	Managing director of operations	
Amanda Duffy	2018–2019	Managing director	
Amanda Duffy	2019–2020	President	
Lisa Baird	2020–2021	Commissioner	
Marla Messing	2021–2022	Interim CEO	
Jessica Berman	2022–present	Commissioner	

Former general manager of the United States women's national soccer team Cheryl Bailey was announced by US Soccer president Sunil Gulati as the first commissioner of the NWSL on November 29, 2012. On November 18, 2014, she resigned after overseeing two seasons and the launch of the new professional league in less than five months ahead of the inaugural season.

On January 6, 2015, Jeff Plush, managing director of Colorado Rapids and a former MLS board member, was named as Bailey's successor. Plush oversaw the 2015 and 2016 seasons, including the Orlando Pride expansion, a broadcast partnership with A+E Networks (including the three-year broadcast deal with Lifetime television), and the sale of the Western New York Flash to North Carolina FC owner Stephen Malik and the team's relocation to North Carolina. During his tenure, former Louisville City FC president Amanda Duffy was hired in December 2016 as the NWSL's managing director of operations.

Plush resigned as commissioner on March 2, 2017, and the position remained vacant until 2020, although Duffy served as the public face of league management. On January 15, 2019, Duffy was promoted to president, the league's highest office.

On January 7, 2020, Amanda Duffy announced that she would leave the NWSL for a leadership position at the Orlando Pride on February 15, 2020. On February 27, 2020, the NWSL announced that Lisa Baird, chief marketing officer of the New York Public Radio, would become the league's commissioner on March 10, 2020. Baird resigned on October 1, 2021, during the NWSL abuse scandal. On October 18, 2021, the league hired Marla Messing as its Interim CEO. On April 20, 2022, Jessica Berman became commissioner, overlapping with CEO Messing, who continued work until May 31.

== Sexual harassment ==
The NWSL has undergone many allegations and reports of sexual harassment, misconduct, and emotional abuse by coaches and staff over the years, and it has received a significant amount of criticism.

== See also ==
- List of National Women's Soccer League seasons
- List of foreign NWSL players
- Prominent women's sports leagues in the United States and Canada
- Professional sports leagues in the United States
- List of professional sports teams in the United States and Canada
- Women's soccer in the United States
- Women's professional sports

== Notes ==
Preceded by Women's Professional Soccer	Division 1 soccer league in the United States; 2013–present	Succeeded by Incumbent
