= The St. James (sports complex) =

Sports complex in Springfield, Virginia

- TSJ Fieldhouse
- Interactive map of The St. James
- Address: 6805 Industrial Road; Springfield, Virginia; United States
- Coordinates: 38°47′50.9403″N 77°10′48.74146″W
- Acreage: 20

Construction
- Groundbreaking: 2017
- Opened: September 15, 2018; 8 years ago
- Architect: HKS, Inc.
- Builder: Akridge Development Co.
- General contractor: L.F. Jennings

Tenants
- D.C. Divas (playing venue); D.C. United (training venue)

Website
- www.thestjames.com

The St. James is a 20-acre (8.1 ha) 450,000-square-foot multi-purpose sports complex located in Springfield, Virginia, United States. The complex includes a private health club, water park; venues for basketball, volleyball, baseball and softball, swimming, climbing, gymnastics, golf, and squash; and two professional regulation-sized indoor ice hockey rinks and one soccer pitch. The complex is used by Major League Soccer (MLS) team D.C. United as its official training center and by Women's Football Alliance team D.C. Divas as a home venue.

== History ==
The St. James was founded by former football players Craig A.A. Dixon, an investment banker, and Kendrick F. Ashton Jr., a mergers and acquisitions lawyer, who met as classmates at the College of William & Mary in 1994. Dixon and Ashton serve as co-chief executive officers. The organization's name is a reference to the Court of St. James in honor of its association with the college. The organization began investigating real estate in the Washington metropolitan area, including an unsolicited June 2013 development proposal submitted to Alexandria, Virginia, for the development of a large-scale sports complex and health club that the group withdrew due to restrictions on the property. Cain provided primary investment in the venture after a meeting between the organization's founders and Cain board member Todd Boehly during a William & Mary event.

== The St. James Performance Academy ==
In August 2024, The St. James Performance Academy opened as a college preparatory for high school and middle school athletes. The campus is located on 20 acres in Springfield, with Tim Simpson as Head of School, Dr. Tere Hernandez-Acosta as Chief Academic Officer and Elyse Graziano as Chief Sports Officer. The basketball team plays in the nation’s premier conference, the Nike EYBL Scholastic.

== Venues ==
The complex includes a FIFA-regulation-sized indoor artificial turf field, two NHL-regulation-sized indoor ice hockey rinks, and an Olympic-size swimming pool. The soccer pitch can also be converted for use as a lacrosse, gridiron football, and rugby field. The complex also includes squash courts, a gymnastics center, and four full-length basketball courts convertible to volleyball courts. Since 2022, women's gridiron football team D.C. Divas have used the indoor pitch as a home venue.

Entertainment and training facilities include baseball batting cages, golf simulators, climbing and bouldering facilities, an arcade, and an indoor water park and playground. In 2019, the complex added a restaurant named Vim & Victor.

== Programs and events ==
Upon opening, the facility announced plans to provide 1,200 programs across 30 sports.

=== Ice hockey ===
The St. James's ice hockey rinks opened during a shortage of available ice time in the Washington metro area. The complex operates youth ice hockey clubs that have exclusive use of the rinks, and its youth teams have featured the sons of Washington Capitals players Nicklas Backstrom and Karl Alzner. Capitals player Alex Ovechkin attended the facility's groundbreaking and helped coach its under-10 boys team during its grand opening. The facility's ice rinks are primarily for members and its own teams.

=== Men's soccer ===
In April 2019, MLS team D.C. United entered a five-year agreement to use The St. James complex as the club's official training center, and the team has held preseason training camp in its indoor soccer pitch. In January 2023, the St. James hired former D.C. United head of performance Mateus Manoel as its performance director.

=== Women's soccer ===
In May 2019, The St. James purchased local youth soccer club F.C. Virginia, which had been founded in 2005 by Christian Cziommer and fielded a senior team in the Women's Premier Soccer League during the 2006 WPSL season. Cziommer joined The St. James organization after the sale.

==== Washington Spirit controversy and bid ====
In 2020, professional National Women's Soccer League (NWSL) team Washington Spirit's assistant coach Tom Torres left the team. In April 2021, The St. James FC Virginia hired Torres as senior staff coach for its girls' academy. An August 2021 report in The Athletic alleged that Torres' exit was linked to inappropriate behavior at a party following the 2020 NWSL Challenge Cup.

In August 2021, Spirit coach Richie Burke — who had previously coached FC Virginia and had been accused of using abusive language toward youth players during his tenure there — was reassigned to the Spirit's front office. Following the reassignment, The Washington Post published a report containing allegations by former players, including Kaiya McCullough, of racist and abusive behavior by Burke. The Spirit subsequently suspended and launched an investigation into Burke's behavior. The suspension would incite the 2021 NWSL abuse scandal, leading to the permanent banning of Burke and three other NWSL coaches in 2023.

The scandal led to Spirit owner Steve Baldwin announcing that he would sell the Spirit in October 2021. In November 2021, The St. James co-founders Ashton and Dixon submitted a bid with Boehly, Eldridge Industries, and investor Jennifer Tepper Mackesy to purchase the Spirit at a valuation of $16 million. As part of the bid's public announcement in December 2021, The St. James described plans to provide performance services, youth soccer programming, and brand partnerships to the team. Boehly withdrew from the bid in January 2022 and Spirit minority owner Y. Michele Kang completed her purchase of the team in March.

== Expansion ==
=== Chicago metropolitan area ===
In 2018, Dixon and Ashton described plans to open a second complex in the northern suburbs of Chicago, Illinois in 2021. In February 2018, the organization submitted preliminary plans for a 435,000-square-foot complex on 43 acres in the village of Lincolnshire, Illinois, which began a two-year zoning and architectural review process in August 2018. The village approved the plans in March 2020 following public hearings, zoning and architectural reviews, and public comment. The St. James requested and received a one-year extension for submitting plans on the project in February 2021, citing the economic impact of the COVID-19 pandemic on the company's finances. As of January 27, 2021, construction was expected to begin in the second quarter of 2023.

=== Bethesda, Maryland ===
In January 2023, The St. James opened a 50,000-square-foot health club and pool in Bethesda, Maryland. The site was formerly a Washington Sports Club location.
