= Steve Malik =

American businessman and sports executive

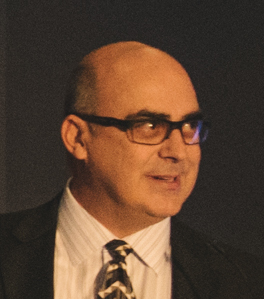
- Malik at a presentation in 2016.
- Born: Stephen Malik; Swansea, Wales
- Occupations: Entrepreneur, sports team owner
- Known for: North Carolina Courage; North Carolina FC; Downtown South

Stephen Malik is a Welsh-American businessman and sports owner who owns and is chairman of North Carolina FC of United Soccer League and North Carolina Courage of National Women's Soccer League. He also founded and was executive chairman of medical technology company Medfusion, and was a member of the United States Soccer Federation board of directors from March 2017 to March 2019 and February 2020 to February 2021.

== Early life ==
Malik was born in Swansea, Wales. His family moved to Kinston, North Carolina, when Malik was four years old to follow his father's work as a chemical engineer for DuPont. As a child he became a fan of baseball and the Baltimore Orioles, but lost interest during Major League Baseball's steroid era.

In 1978, Malik attended Kinston High School and started its soccer team with his friends.

Malik attended and graduated from UNC Kenan–Flagler Business School in 1985 with a business administration degree.

In 1995, Malik moved to North Carolina's Research Triangle with his family. He took an interest in soccer and began coaching his children's teams in the Capital Area Soccer League (CASL). After taking ownership of North Carolina FC, he facilitated the merger of CASL and Triangle Futbol Club Alliance into North Carolina FC Youth.

== Entrepreneurship ==
Malik founded medical technology company Medfusion in Cary, North Carolina in 1996. In 2010, he sold the company to Intuit for $91 million, which renamed the company Intuit Health.

Malik re-acquired the company from Intuit in 2013 and became its executive chairman. He then sold the company again in December 2019 to Irvine, California-based NextGen Healthcare, and funded a spinoff company named Greenlight Health Data Solutions. Malik sold the company to help continue work on the Downtown South development project.

== Sports ownership ==
=== North Carolina FC ===
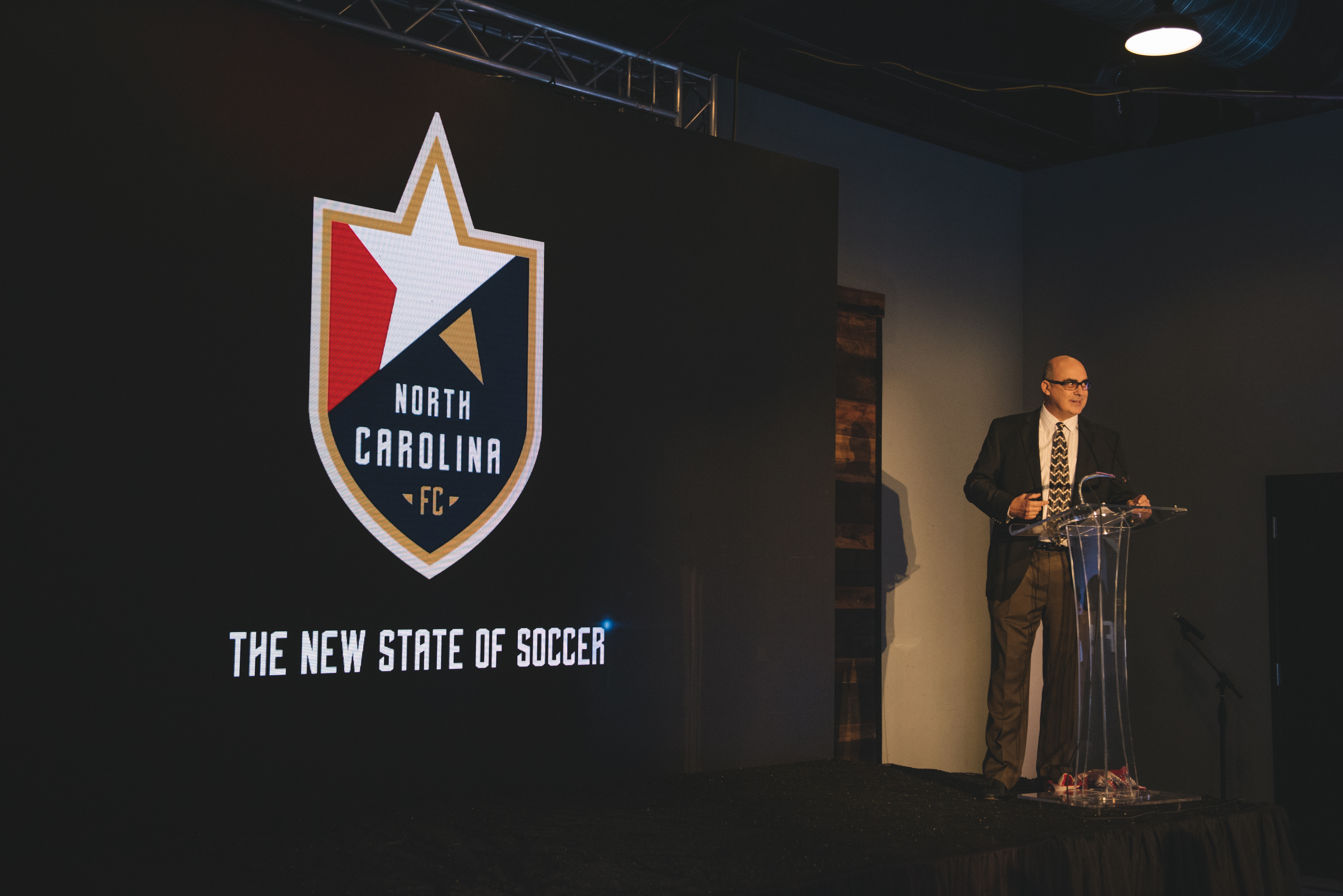
Steve Malik presents the North Carolina FC rebranding in 2016.

In the summer of 2015, Traffic Sports USA president and North American Soccer League (NASL) chairman Aaron Davidson was indicted on money laundering and wire fraud charges as part of the 2015 FIFA corruption case. Traffic Sports owned the NASL team Carolina RailHawks and subsequently listed it for sale.

On October 30, 2015, Malik purchased the RailHawks from Traffic Sports.

On November 16, 2017, North Carolina FC formally left the NASL for the United Soccer League (USL). As the RailHawks, the club had been one of the first six teams to break away from USL-1 in November 2009, and upon its exit was the last of those six to leave the NASL. The exit had been first publicized during a preliminary injunction hearing on October 31, 2017, for the NASL in its suit against the United States Soccer Federation (USSF) denying the league sanctioning as a second-division league. Malik also served at the time on the USSF board of directors. The U.S. District Court for the Eastern District of New York later denied the injunction request.

=== North Carolina Courage ===
On January 10, 2017, Malik announced the purchase of reigning National Women's Soccer League champions Western New York Flash, based in Rochester, New York, and his intent to relocate the team to Cary and rename it the North Carolina Courage.

Under Malik's ownership, the Courage went on an unprecedented run of titles, winning three consecutive NWSL Shields, two consecutive NWSL Championships, and the NWSL Challenge Cup and Women's International Champions Cup once each.

On May 17, 2021, the Courage announced the addition of professional tennis player Naomi Osaka, local businesspeople Ashlie and Michael Bucy, sports marketing executive Sara Toussaint and her husband R. James Toussaint, and Capitol Broadcasting Company.

==== Role in NWSL abuse scandals ====
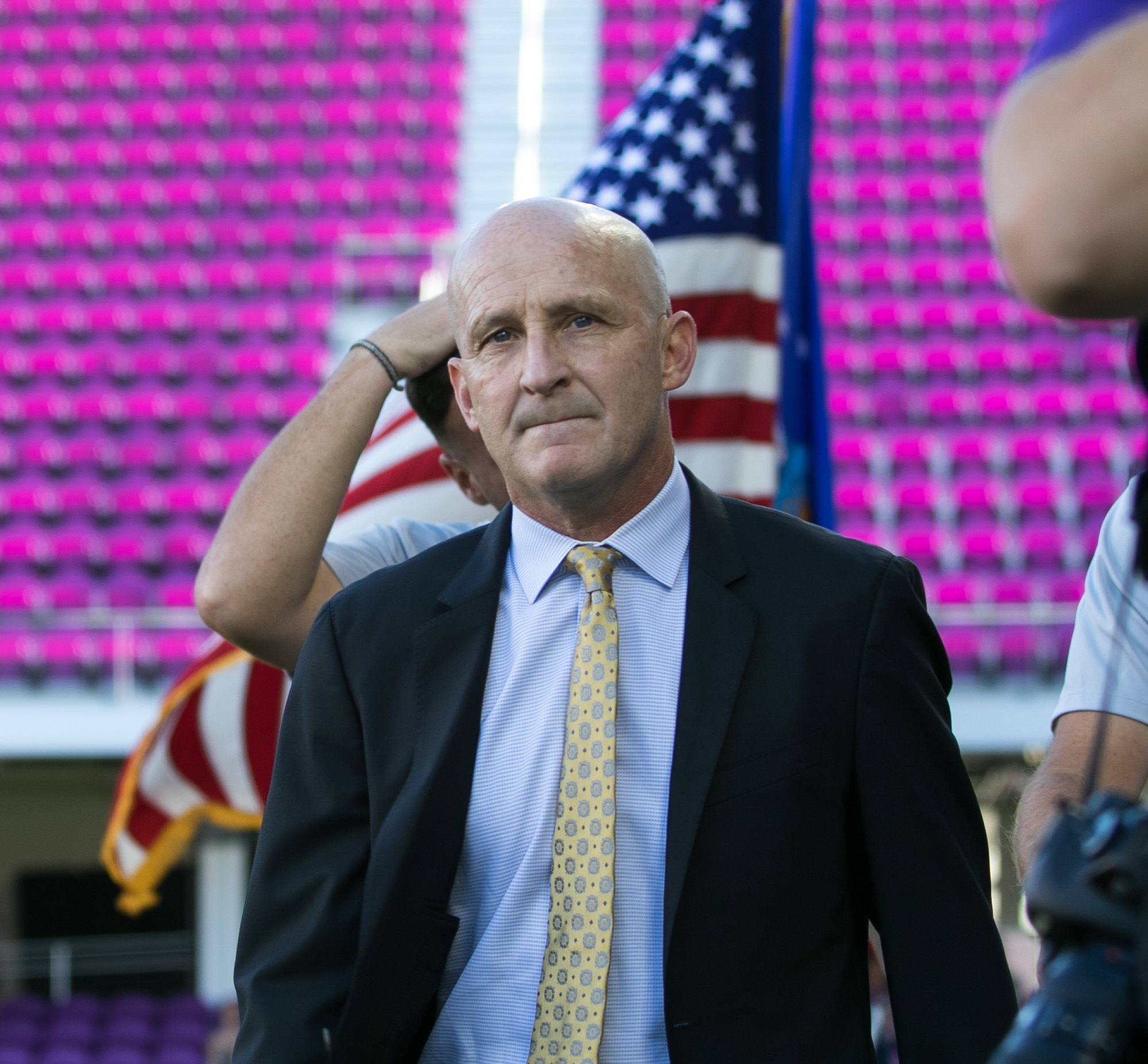
Paul Riley as head coach of the Courage in 2017.

In 2017, the Courage hired Paul Riley as its first coach. Riley had coached the Western New York Flash to a championship in the previous season.

On October 3, 2022, an investigation into reported abuses in the NWSL, commissioned by the USSF and led by Sally Yates, resulted in the Yates Report. The report included several allegations of sexual misconduct and abusive behavior by Riley during his tenures with multiple clubs, particularly Portland Thorns FC, which received reports of inappropriate sexual behavior by Riley with players and publicly stated that it had Riley's contract expire that year due to the team's poor on-field performance. The report found that Malik contacted the Thorns, Flash, NWSL, and USSF for information about Riley, but could not receive a detailed report from the Thorns or learn that the team had privately decided to remove Riley due to the allegations. Malik called Thorns owner Merritt Paulson to ask about Riley's exit and learned of one of the reported incidents, but was told by Paulson that Riley had simply exercised "poor judgment", that no other abuse had been reported, and that Riley was "a good fit for the roster" at Western New York, which Malik was acquiring as part of his purchasing the Courage.

In 2019, the subject of Riley's behavior again came up in a conversation between Malik and Paulson when Riley was under consideration to be hired as manager of the United States national women's soccer team. Paulson's texts to Malik contradicted Paulson's statements to the investigation that Paulson had told Malik that the Thorns had terminated Riley's employment. Malik continued corresponding with Paulson after learning from a reporter that Riley may have removed himself from the search due to an incident in Portland, to which Paulson deferred to Riley, who had told Malik that his exit was due to a disagreement over the amount of control Riley could have over the team. U.S. Soccer counsel Lydia Wahlke also noted that Malik "has the right to hire a coach that exercises poor judgment" with regard to the reported incident of sexual misconduct.

The report also noted an incident in July 2021 where Riley allegedly inappropriately directed players to lose weight and text Riley their weight daily for months. The incident was reported to the league, which notified Malik in September and advised him to tell Riley to leave such discussions to nutritionists and phrase such comments more conscientiously. A report published in December 2022 by an investigation jointly commissioned by the league and National Women's Soccer League Players Association noted that Malik did not follow up with players after being notified about the alleged misconduct because he assumed the league would respond to the complaint.

In September 2021, the league received four complaints of serious misconduct by Riley, and on September 7, 2021, Malik texted NWSL commissioner Lisa Baird that Riley had resigned over the league's proposed postseason schedule, which Malik refused to accept. Baird notified Malik the following day that she had urged Riley not to resign. The Courage fired Riley nonetheless on September 30, 2021, following the release of a report in The Athletic detailing Riley's history of alleged sexual misconduct with players. On October 6, 2021, Malik published an open letter to claim that the Courage were aware of the Thorns' investigation into Riley's alleged misconduct in 2015, but was "subsequently assured he was in good standing".

==== Jaelene Daniels signings ====
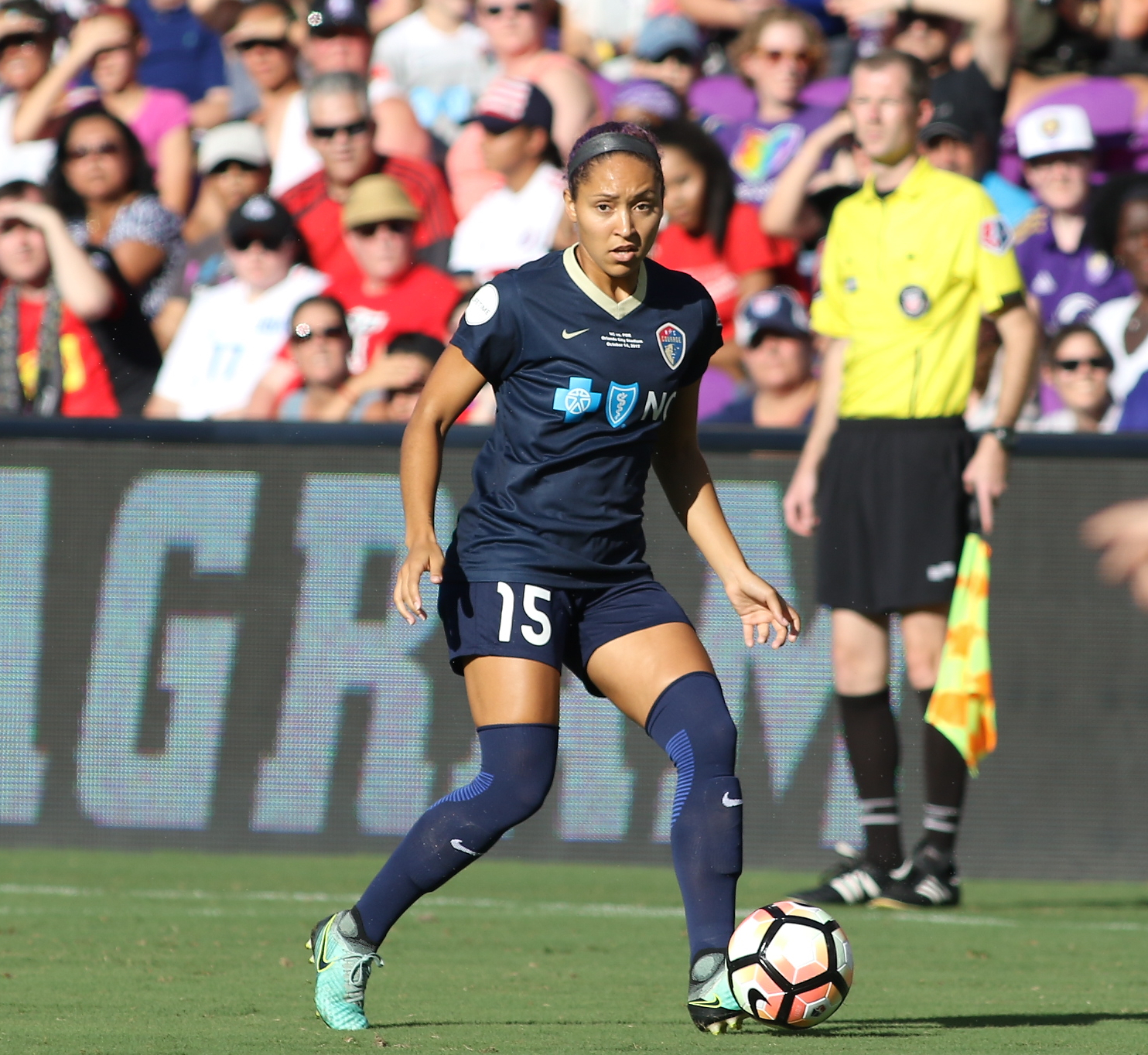
Jaelene Daniels playing for the North Carolina Courage in 2017.

The Flash roster acquired by the Courage included Jaelene Daniels, then Jaelene Hinkle, a defender the Flash drafted in 2015. In June 2017, Daniels was called into camp for the United States national team to play in international friendlies against Sweden and Norway but did not attend, citing "personal reasons." In a May 2018 interview with The 700 Club, which included segments filmed at Courage practices and its home stadium, Daniels revealed that she withdrew from the team for the June 2017 friendlies because she did not want to wear USSF jerseys with rainbow-colored numbers honoring LGBT pride month, saying "I just felt so convicted in my spirit that it wasn't my job to wear this jersey."

Malik defended Daniels's decision on Twitter, stating that "faith acted on in personal conviction harming no one else deserves respect just as much as creating a welcoming environment for all."

Daniels retired with the Courage in 2020, but returned and was re-signed by the Courage on December 19, 2021. Malik initially defended the signing in a statement citing Daniels' "positive impact ... on the Courage's successful history". After a negative response from fans, the club posted an unsigned open letter apologizing for the signing but retained her for the 2022 season.

During the 2022 season, Daniels refused to wear the Courage's LGBT pride-themed jersey for a Pride Night match and was not rostered for the match.

Former players, including Sam Mewis, Lynn Williams, and Merritt Mathias while she was still with the Courage, later questioned or openly criticized the club in retrospect about the club's decisions around Daniels. Mathias also noted that the club did not hold a pride night for three years.

Following the 2022 season, the Courage declined to exercise an option to extend Daniels' contract, making her an unrestricted free agent.

=== Major League Soccer bid ===
In 2016, Major League Soccer (MLS) announced plans to add four expansion teams. Malik initiated a bid in December 2016 to bring a MLS team to Raleigh, announced in July 2017 to include a 22,000-seat, $150 million stadium and $2 billion property development project called Downtown South. MLS did not consider Malik's bid in 2017.

When Charlotte FC, also in North Carolina, submitted its bid for a MLS team in 2019, Malik stated doubts about the franchise's prospects and said it did not preclude his bid for a team in Raleigh. MLS again declined Malik's bid and approved the Charlotte bid in December 2019.

== U.S. Soccer administration ==
Malik was elected to a two-year term on the USSF board of directors as part of the Pro Council in March 2017. He ran for re-election but lost to USL CEO Alec Papadakis in March 2019.

Malik returned to the USSF board's Pro Council in February 2020. In June 2020, Malik lobbied the USSF board to remove a rule prohibiting peaceful protest during the national anthem played or performed before every match. Malik was replaced on the council by Lisa Baird in 2021 upon her hiring by the league as its new commissioner.

On November 27, 2017, NASL asked USSF to remove Malik from the board of directors due to a conflict of interest created when Malik moved North Carolina FC from NASL to USL and pursued a MLS expansion bid.
