= List of owners of National Women's Soccer League teams =

National Women's Soccer League owners own a share in the National Women's Soccer League (NWSL) and have the right to operate a team. Players' rights to play in the league are held an individual team. Each NWSL team has an investor-operator that is a shareholder in the league. The league has a profit-sharing arrangement amongst the teams.

As of June 2025, the league has 16 investor-operator individuals or groups for its 14 current and 2 future clubs.

== Teams ==
=== Angel City FC ===
Angel City FC was founded in 2020 by Kara Nortman, Natalie Portman, Alexis Ohanian, and Julie Uhrman. Other notable investors include:

- Uzo Aduba
- Becky G
- Shannon Boxx
- Sophia Bush
- Jessica Chastain
- James Corden
- Amanda Cromwell
- Lorrie Fair
- Ronnie Fair
- Joy Fawcett
- America Ferrera
- Julie Foudy
- Jennifer Garner
- Lauren Holiday
- Mia Hamm
- Angela Hucles
- Cobi Jones
- Ryan Kalil
- Billie Jean King
- Ilana Kloss
- Eva Longoria
- Shannon MacMillan
- Casey Neistat
- Candace Parker
- Chris Paul
- Lilly Singh
- Matthew Stafford
- P. K. Subban
- Rachel Van Hollebeke
- Tisha Venturini
- Lindsey Vonn
- Abby Wambach
- Saskia Webber
- Serena Williams

=== Bay FC ===
- Sixth Street Partners (managing), Rick Welts, Sheryl Sandberg, Brandi Chastain, Aly Wagner, Danielle Slaton, Leslie Osborne, Andre Iguodala (minority)

=== Chicago Stars FC ===
Arnim Whisler was a co-founding owner of the originally-named Chicago Red Stars in 2007 in Women's Professional Soccer, the top American league at the time. He was owner of the Chicago Red Stars in the NWSL from the inception of the league in 2012 until September 1, 2023, when Whisler and all minority owners of the Red Stars sold their stakes to an investment group led by Laura Ricketts, which included Debra Cafaro, Jennifer Pritzker, and Hilary Rosen.

=== Denver Summit FC ===
- Lead investors of the Denver Summit FC are Rob Cohen (Controlling Owner & Governor) and Mellody Hobson (Alternate Governor). Other minority investors are: Jon-Erik Borgen, Kaia Borgen Moritz, Randi Borgen, Neelima Joshi, Dhiren Jhaveri, Molly Coors, Vishal Soin, Brooke Woody, Mikaela Shiffrin, Peyton Manning, Cordillera Investment Partners, and For Denver FC Capital Partners.

=== Houston Dash ===
The majority owner of the Houston Dash is Ted Segal.

Other investors include Gabriel Brener, Oscar De La Hoya, and Ben Guill.

James Harden joined the ownership group in 2019.

=== Kansas City Current ===
Lead investors of the Kansas City Current are Angie and Chris Long. Other minority investors include Jen Gulvik and Brittany Matthews and her husband Patrick Mahomes. (2020–present; started play in 2021)

=== NJ/NY Gotham FC ===
The founding investor of NJ/NY Gotham FC is Thomas Hofstetter Since 2012, majority owners have included Tammy Murphy, Phil Murphy, Steven Temares. In 2020, Ed Nalbandian joined as a minority owner. In 2022, Kristin Bernert, Karen Bryant, Carli Lloyd, Sue Bird, Kevin Durant, and Rich Kleiman joined as minority owners.

=== North Carolina Courage ===
Since 2017, Steve Malik has been the majority and managing owner of the North Carolina Courage and served as its chairman.

- Naomi Osaka joined as a minority owner in January 2021.
- Capitol Broadcasting Company (CBC), Ashlie and Michael Bucy, and Sara and R. James Toussaint joined as minority owners in May 2021.
- Jim and Sue Datin, Torry Holt, Downtown South developer Kane Realty, and nine other local investors joined as minority owners in July 2021.
- CBC increased its stake in the Courage and acquired a seat on the club's board of directors in August 2023.
- Ons Jabeur joined as a minority owner in August 2023.

=== Seattle Reign FC ===
- 2024–: The Carlyle Group (majority) and Seattle Sounders FC
- 2020–2024: OL Groupe (89.5%), Bill and Teresa Predmore (7.5%), Tony Parker (3%)
- 2019–2020: Bill and Teresa Predmore (majority), The Baseball Club of Tacoma LLC, Adrian Hanauer, and Lenore Hanauer
- 2012–2019: Bill and Teresa Predmore, founding owners

=== Orlando Pride ===
- Since 2021: The Wilf Family (Mark Wilf, Zygi Wilf, Lenny Wilf)
- 2018–2021: Flávio Augusto da Silva (majority), Phil Rawlins (minority), Albert Friedberg (minority)
- 2015–2018: Flávio Augusto da Silva (majority) and Phil Rawlins (minority)

=== Portland Thorns FC ===
- Raj Sports, (2024-)
- Merritt Paulson (majority), Arctos Partners (15%) (2021-2024)
- Merritt Paulson (2012–2021)

=== Racing Louisville FC ===
- Soccer Holdings, LLC (2019–present; started play in 2021)

=== San Diego Wave FC ===
- Lauren Leichtman and Arthur Levine (majority owners)
  Alex Morgan and Jimmy Butler (minority investors) (2024-)
- Ronald Burkle (2022-24)

=== Washington Spirit ===
- Y. Michele Kang (2022–present)
- Steve Baldwin (managing), Michele Kang, and Bill Lynch (minority) (2020–2022), with other minority investors joining in 2021, including Jenna Bush Hager, Chelsea Clinton, Brianna Scurry, and Dominique Dawes.
- Steve Baldwin (majority) and Bill Lynch (minority) (2018–2020)
- Bill Lynch (2012–2018)

=== Utah Royals ===
- Gail Miller (majority) and David Blitzer (minority) (2025–present)
- David Blitzer and Ryan Smith (2023–2025)
- Dell Loy Hansen (2017–2020)

== Former teams ==
=== Boston Breakers ===
- Michael Stoller, Boston Women's Soccer, LLC (2012–2018)

=== FC Kansas City ===
- Chris Likens, Brad Likens, Greg Likens, and Brian Budzinski (Missouri Comets owners) (2012–2017)
- Elam Baer (2017)

=== Western New York Flash ===
- Joe Sahlen (2013–2017)
