= Gavin Wilkinson =

New Zealand footballer

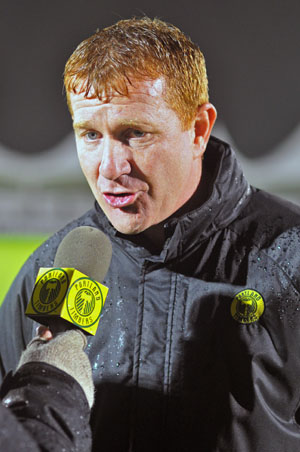

Personal information
- Full name: Gavin Brian Wilkinson
- Date of birth: 5 November 1973 (age 52)
- Place of birth: Auckland, New Zealand
- Height: 1.83 m (6 ft 0 in)
- Position: Defender

Senior career*
Years	Team	Apps	(Gls)
1992–1996	Waitakere City		
1996–1999	Perth Glory	68	(4)
1999–2000	Instant-Dict	13	(2)
2000	Geylang United	15	(2)
2000–2001	Kilkenny City	12	(0)
2001–2006	Portland Timbers	124	(4)

International career^{‡}
1996–2002	New Zealand	33	(1)

Managerial career
- 2005–2006: Portland Timbers (USL) (assistant)
- 2007–2010: Portland Timbers (USL)
- 2012: Portland Timbers (interim)
Medal record
Representing New Zealand
Men's Association football
OFC Nations Cup
Winner	1998 Australia
Runner-up	2000 Tahiti
- * Club domestic league appearances and goals as of 22:47, 29 January 2013 (UTC) ‡ National team caps and goals as of 22 October 2007

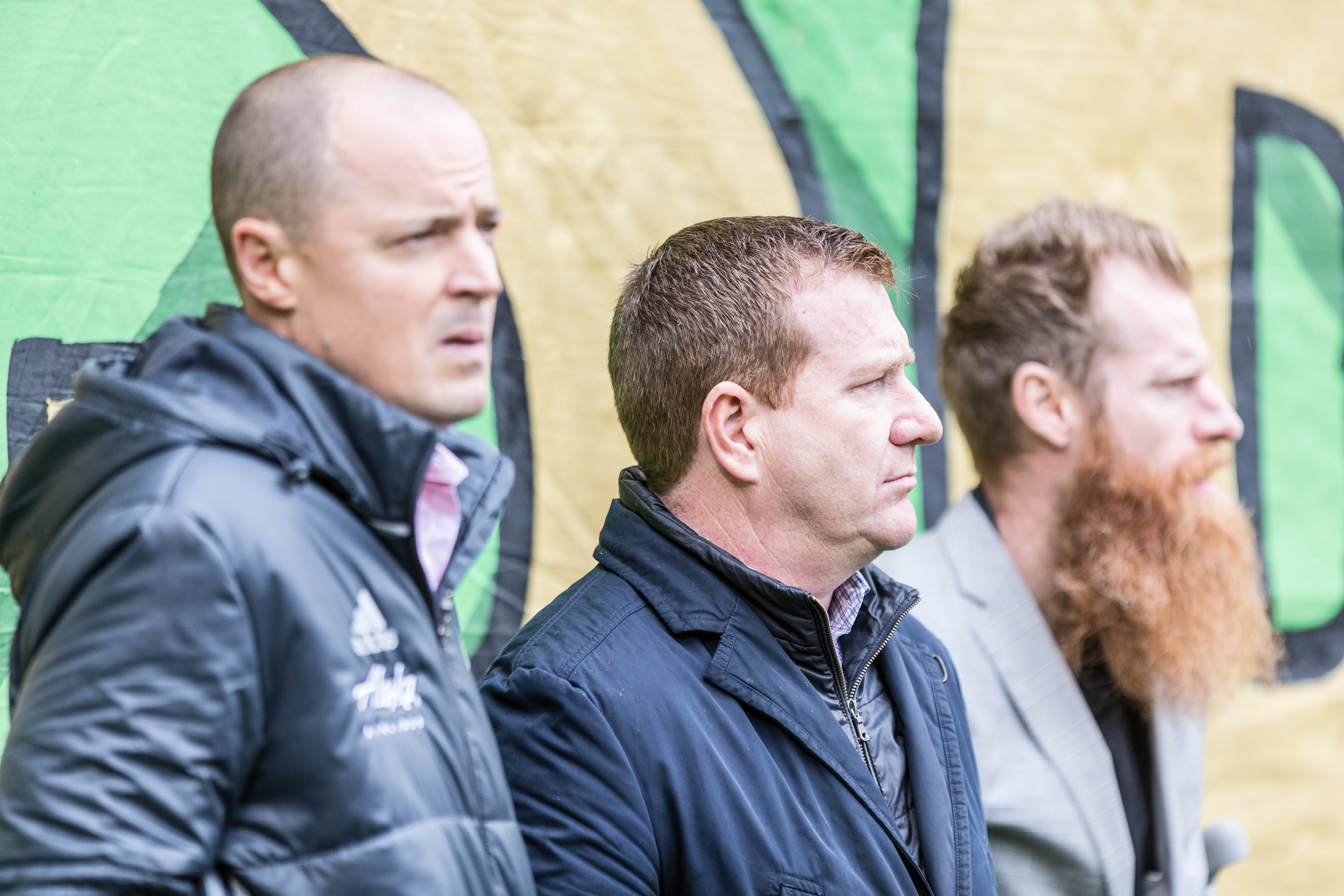
Wilkinson (centre) with Timbers owner Merritt Paulson (left) and player Nat Borchers in 2016

Gavin Wilkinson (born 5 November 1973) is a former New Zealand footballer who served as general manager and President of Soccer for the Portland Timbers from 2009 to 2022.

Prior to this position, Wilkinson was manager of Portland Timbers in the United Soccer League before their promotion to Major League Soccer beginning with the 2011 season. As a player, he was known as a strong leader and defender.

Wilkinson was general manager and president of soccer for the Portland Thorns FC from its inception in 2013 until 2022. He was mentioned in the USSF Yates Report and NWSL Covington Report which documented allegations that Thorn's coach Paul Riley had engaged in sexual misconduct. Neither report recommended sanctions for Wilkinson, who was cleared of wrongdoing by an internal investigation and report conducted by DLA Piper, which found that Wilkinson was not involved with the events beyond terminating Paul Riley. He was hired by Sporting Kansas City in January 2024 to serve as the franchise's sporting director, but released shortly after backlash from their fanbase.

== Playing career ==
=== Club career ===
Wilkinson played defence for with the USL Portland Timbers from 2001 to 2006, adding assistant coach duties in 2005 and 2006. Wilkinson retired as an active player and was named Head Coach and General Manager for Portland Timbers in September 2006. During the 2009 season, he directed the Timbers to the Commissioner's Cup as the regular season champion and a league record 24 game unbeaten string (14-0-10), smashing the previous record of 16.

=== International career ===
Wilkinson played for the New Zealand national football team, the All Whites and collected 33 caps in official FIFA internationals, scoring 1 goal.

== Post-playing career ==
Wilkinson also volunteers for EastSide Timbers FC, a youth soccer club based in Gresham, Oregon that he helped found and formerly ran.

=== Portland Timbers and Portland Thorns ===
On 18 January 2010, Wilkinson was named Technical Director of the expansion Portland Timbers club in Major League Soccer (MLS), set to begin play in the 2011 season. He assumed those duties while still coaching the Timbers through the 2010 season.

During his tenure as president of soccer, the team appeared in the MLS Cup Playoffs seven times, winning the 2015 MLS Cup and the 2020 MLS is Back Tournament. The team also won the Cascadia Cup in 2012, 2017 and 2022. The Timbers were consistently ranked on the Forbes list of the most valuable MLS clubs and Sportico's list of most valuable MLS clubs. The team entered the league in 2011 for a $35 million expansion fee and reached valuation of $390 million in 2019 and $635 million in 2021.

Wilkinson was the general manager of the Portland Thorns, the Timbers' sister club in the National Women's Soccer League from its inception in 2013. Under Wilkinson, the Thorns were the most successful team in the NWSL, winning three championships between 2013 and 2021. The team had the highest attendance in the league, and was valued at $65 million.

In 2021, Wilkinson was put on administrative leave from the Thorns and later replaced by Karina LeBlanc due to a scandal surrounding allegations that coach Paul Riley, originally hired by Wilkinson, had sexually harassed Thorns players during his tenure from 2014 to 2015. An investigation by DLA Piper found that Wilkinson had committed no wrongdoing and had no involvement in the scandal besides terminating Riley after the 2015 season.

An October 2022 report on abuse in the NWSL commissioned by the USSF and led by Sally Yates stated that Wilkinson had indicated that Riley should be hired by a different club, and that he had initially claimed to reporters that Riley was fired because the team failed to make the playoffs. In the report, medical staff of the club alleged that Wilkinson was told that Riley had endangered players by interfering with medical treatment.

Wilkinson and the Portland Timbers front office faced further accusations of inaction in response to abuse reports in February 2022, after Andy Polo's contract with the Timbers was terminated due to allegations of domestic violence made by Polo's ex-partner. Police reports indicated that Timbers employees were present when police arrived to investigate the initial call in May 2021, but the team failed to report the incident to the league for nine months. Polo's ex-partner stated that the Timbers did not try to dissuade her from filing charges against Polo, which was confirmed by an MLS investigation in March 2022. The investigation also found that the Timbers did not intentionally conceal the incident or their involvement.

On 4 October, Timbers and Thorns owner Merritt Paulson announced that he, Wilkinson, and team president Mike Golub would recuse themselves from all Thorns decisions. Earlier that day, the Timbers Army and Rose City Riveters formally demanded the removal of Wilkinson and Golub and for Paulson to sell the teams.

On 5 October, Wilkinson and Golub were fired from the club. A report in The Athletic stated that Wilkinson was set to receive a contract extension, with a clause which allowed the club to terminate for cause.

=== Sporting Kansas City ===
Wilkinson was hired by Sporting Kansas City in January 2024 to serve as the club's sporting director. However, Wilkinson and Sporting Kansas City "mutually agreed" to part ways after backlash from the team's fanbase about his previous role in covering up sexual abuse in Portland.

== Personal life ==
Wilkinson and his wife have two children.

=== Philanthropy ===
Wilkinson has been noted for his philanthropy. During his tenure, the Timbers and Thorns inaugurated their annual Stand Together Week, which hosts volunteer efforts and community outreach events in Portland. Wilkinson has volunteered with and supported nonprofit organizations such as the Make-A-Wish Foundation, which helps support the wishes of critically ill children, Blessings in a Backpack, which provides nutritious meals to students, Solve Cleanup, which removes litter from public spaces, and student art programs.

== Honours ==
=== Player ===
'Perth Glory

- Most Glorious Player Award: 1996-1997

New Zealand

- OFC Nations Cup: 1998; Runner-up, 2000

=== Manager ===
Portland Timbers

- Cascadia Cup: 2012
- USL-1 Coach of the Year: 2007, 2009

== Managerial stats ==
Team	Nat	From	To	Record				
Team	Nat	From	To	G	W	L	D	Win %
Portland Timbers	United States	26 September 2006	10 October 2010	118	50	29	39	42.37

Awards
Preceded by Inaugural	Perth Glory Most Glorious Player Award; 1996–97	Succeeded by Danny Hay
Preceded by Mike Anhaeuser	USL-1 Coach of the Year; 2007	Succeeded by Colin Clarke
Preceded by Colin Clarke	USL-1 Coach of the Year; 2009	Succeeded by Bob Lilley
