= Yates Report =

2022 United States Soccer Federation report

The Yates Report, officially titled Report of the Independent Investigation to the U.S. Soccer Federation Concerning Allegations of Abusive Behavior and Sexual Misconduct in Women's Professional Soccer, is the official report documenting the findings and conclusions concerning abusive behavior and sexual misconduct in women's professional soccer, with a focus on the National Women's Soccer League (NWSL). The 173-page report (319 pages including footnotes and appendices) was publicly released by the United States Soccer Federation (USSF) on October 3, 2022. It is named for Sally Yates, the King & Spalding partner who led the investigation who had previously served as acting United States Attorney General.

== Background ==
The independent investigation was commissioned by the USSF on October 2, 2021, following a report by The Athletic about then-Portland Thorns manager Paul Riley's sexual harassment and coercion of players Mana Shim and Sinead Farrelly. Investigators identified and reviewed more than 89,000 relevant documents, created a hotline for anonymous reporting of relevant information, and conducted more than 200 interviews of current and former coaches, front office staff, owners, and players from eleven current and former NWSL teams, NWSL employees, player labor union representatives, USSF personnel, and representatives from the United States Center for SafeSport.

== Report findings ==
As described by Defector Media, "The Yates report was a 319-page document that's difficult to summarize because it covers so much, but one way to put it would be that the document was a deep-dive into the systemic abuse that occurred in the NWSL and why it was allowed to happen, with a focus on three specific ex-coaches: Paul Riley (Portland Thorns, North Carolina Courage), Rory Dames (Chicago Red Stars), and Christy Holly (Sky Blue FC, Racing Louisville). All three coached in the league for years. All three were accused by former players of egregious workplace misconduct. All three got head coaching jobs after players, repeatedly, reported abuse."

The report documented allegations of sexual and emotional abuse by former managers of the NWSL and noted failures at team, league, and USSF leadership levels in addressing player concerns. The report stated that owners and USSF inaction allowed coaches and managers accused of abusive behavior to continue working in the sport.

The report recognized nine key findings:

=== Lack of fundamental player safety measures ===
The report noted that the league did not have an anti-harassment policy until players demanded one in 2021, nor did it have an anti-retaliation policy or an anti-fraternization policy. It cited the USSF's rushed launch of the league, which deprived it of infrastructure, policies, and planning appropriate for a professional sports league despite incidents of harassment, fraternization, and abuse in previous professional and amateur women's and youth soccer leagues in the United States.

=== Systemic abuse and harassment ===
The report focused on reports of alleged abuse by three coaches:

- Racing Louisville FC and former Sky Blue FC manager and United States women's national soccer team opposition scout Christy Holly, accused of engaging in a romantic relationship with Christie Pearce, who he managed at Sky Blue; alleged sexual harassment and abuse of another player he managed at both Sky Blue and Racing Louisville FC; and verbal and emotional abuse of multiple players across teams
- North Carolina Courage and former Western New York Flash and Portland Thorns FC manager Paul Riley, accused of sexual coercion and harassment of multiple players dating back to previous professional leagues, as well as interfering with players' treatment and weight-shaming players
- Chicago Red Stars manager Rory Dames, accused of verbal and emotional abuse of multiple players extending to his time in youth soccer, and inappropriate sexual comments to and relationships with players

The report included detailed allegations of abuse and misconduct, extending beyond sexual abuse and harassment to verbally abusive coaching and insufficient boundaries between staff and players.

It also highlighted systemic issues at clubs, such as then-Thorns head coach Cindy Parlow Cone reporting allegedly sexually harassing comments from Thorns head of business Mike Golub, and Thorns owner Merritt Paulson allegedly attempting to discuss the illicit distribution of a United States women's national team player's nude photographs with Thorns players.

=== Inaction by NWSL and USSF leadership ===
The report alleged that the USSF took no action after United States national team players submitted allegations of abusive behavior by Riley directly to then-USSF president Sunil Gulati and then-manager Jill Ellis, who had forwarded the complaints to USSF then-chief executive officer Dan Flynn, NWSL then-executive director Cheryl Bailey, and NWSL then-general counsel Lisa Levine. It also alleged that Bailey, Gulati, Flynn, USSF counsel Lydia Wahlke, and USSF chief operating officer Jay Berhalter took no action after responses to an anonymous player survey repeated the complaints; and that Plush, Gulati, Flynn, and Levine again took no action after directly receiving a player's detailed report of Riley's behavior, including details omitted by the Thorns from its investigative report, in 2015.

=== Enablement of accused coaches ===
The report further alleged that the Thorns conducted an investigation into multiple player reports of Riley's behavior, but that the Thorns internal investigative report omitted significant details reported by players. The report also noted that the Thorns privately fired Riley but publicly described his exit as a contract non-renewal and thanked him for his service to the team. The report also noted that Thorns and Portland Timbers then-general manager Gavin Wilkinson endorsed him for a new role as manager of the Western New York Flash.

More broadly, the report noted a systemic lack of communication between teams, the NWSL, and USSF of misconduct, and a lack of independent reporting functions for players to effectively escalate their concerns without fear of inaction or retaliation.

=== Whistleblower retaliation ===
The report alleged that players who reported abuse and misbehavior were traded, released, threatened, or otherwise retaliated against, including Mana Shim, Samantha Johnson, Christen Press, and other anonymous players who feared further retaliation if their names were attached to the investigation or subsequent journalistic reporting.

The report also alleged that players, staff, and coaches engaged in inappropriate fraternization that chilled reporting of abuse or normalized it to the point of players being unable to recognize it. The report noted that Riley, Dames, and Holly had all married former players, which further "desensitized the system about power imbalances" and systematically normalized power imbalances that fostered abuse.

=== Lack of job security and protection ===
The report noted that many teams lacked human resource departments, and that league roster rules and policies led to a lack of job security that enabled retaliation and further chilled player reports of misconduct. The report also suggested that the entities' focus on sustaining the league financially blinded them from addressing these systemic player safety problems.

=== Obstruction of investigations ===
The report alleged that Portland Thorns FC, Racing Louisville FC, and Chicago Red Stars impeded Yates' investigation, with the Thorns interfering with witness access and using legal arguments to impede access of relevant documents, the Red Stars taking more than eight months to produce relevant documents, and Louisville refusing to provide documents about Holly and using a non-disclosure agreement to justify preventing current and former employee witnesses from answering questions.

=== Failed responses encouraging further abuse ===
The report noted "institutional failures [by clubs, the league, and USSF] that perpetuated misconduct", which endangered additional players after the fact and further encouraged retaliation against whistleblowers.

=== Scope extending beyond professional adult soccer ===
The report also noted that it had received reports beyond the scope of its NWSL investigation that suggested the scope of its systemic abuse issues extended into American youth soccer, where many NWSL coaches had previously worked, or owned, operated, or directed youth clubs. The report suggested the culture of abuse and players' reluctance to report misconduct originated in similar power imbalances at the youth level.

== Recommendations ==
The Yates Report recommended several actions for teams, the NWSL, and USSF to take toward improving transparency, accountability, rule clarity, player safety and respect, feedback mechanisms, youth soccer measures, discipline, and its interaction with SafeSport.

- Teams should be required to accurately disclose misconduct to the NWSL and USSF to ensure that abusive coaches do not move from team to team
- USSF should require meaningful vetting of coaches and, when necessary, use its licensing authority to hold wrongdoers accountable.
- USSF should require the NWSL to conduct timely investigations into allegations of abuse, impose appropriate discipline, and immediately disseminate investigation outcomes.
- USSF should adopt uniform and clear policies and codes of conduct that apply to all Organization Members and are found in single place on USSF's website.
- USSF should require the NWSL to conduct annual training for players and coaches on applicable policies governing verbal and emotional abuse, sexual misconduct, harassment, and retaliation.
- USSF, the NWSL, and teams should each designate an individual within their organizations who is responsible for player safety.
- USSF should strengthen player safety requirements in professional leagues.
- USSF should require the NWSL to implement a system to annually solicit and act on player feedback.
- USSF should collaborate with its youth member organizations and other stakeholders to examine whether additional measures are necessary to protect youth players.
- The NWSL should determine whether discipline is warranted in light of these findings and the findings of the NWSL/NWSLPA Joint Investigation.
- Teams, the NWSL and USSF should not rely exclusively on SafeSport to keep players safe and should implement safety measures where necessary to protect players in the USSF landscape.

=== Role of SafeSport ===
The report found that the league's and USSF's reliance on the United States Center for SafeSport for player safety was criticized for its perceived inefficiencies.

The report dedicated a separate section of its recommendations to the NWSL's and USSF's intersections with the United States Center for SafeSport.

The section suggested that SafeSport's practice of administratively closing most of its investigations without publishing findings or public records or allegations, and a lack of clarity around SafeSport's jurisdictional control, discouraged the NWSL and USSF from taking its own disciplinary actions or sharing details from player allegations internally.

Of those (1,509 claims investigated in the year from July 1, 2019, to June 30, 2020, SafeSport) administratively closed 515 cases, put 115 cases on administrative hold, and closed 720 claims based on jurisdiction. Of the 1,509 claims, just 122 led to a formal resolution, whereby SafeSport completed its investigation and either closed the matter or issued a decision finding a violation of the SafeSport Code. In other words, SafeSport reached a formal resolution in just 8 percent of all the cases it investigated during that period.

... SafeSport has also instituted an appeals process unlike that even afforded criminal defendants. Rather than reviewing sanctions imposed by the Center for an abuse of discretion, as is required by the SafeSport Code, SafeSport gives respondents the right to what is effectively an entirely new fact-finding process, requiring the claimant to go through the process all over again. As a practical matter, respondents use the right to appeal to take another bite at the apple, in the hope that claimants will not want to rehash their claims.

The section generated public criticism of SafeSport from journalists who covered the allegations. In October 2022, journalist Sally Jenkins wrote a column in The Washington Post that criticized SafeSport as "a false front … little more than another coverup operation, a litigation-avoidance ploy and bottomless pit into which to dump complaints and disguise inaction." In May 2023, USA Today reporter Nancy Armour noted that six months after the Yates Report's publication, and after 18 months of investigation, SafeSport had lifted USSF's suspension of Dames' coaching license while continuing to investigate him, and USSF president Parlow Cone said SafeSport had refused to share its findings or reasoning with USSF, contra Yates' recommendations. Armour also noted that SafeSport had obstructed USSF's attempts to reform its licensing and vetting processes over jurisdictional concerns, and also suggested contradictions from SafeSport CEO Ju’Riese Colon on whether anyone from SafeSport had been interviewed for the report as Yates had claimed.

== Aftermath ==
After the report's release, NWSL commissioner Jessica Berman emphasized the renewed importance of the parallel investigation being conducted jointly by the NWSL and NWSL Players Association. Many of the allegations in the Yates Report reappeared in that investigation's report, which also detailed additional allegations of harassment and abusive or inappropriate behavior by managers.

Following the release of the NWSL/NWSLPA joint investigative report in January 2023, the NWSL permanently banned Riley, Holly, Dames, and former Washington Spirit head coach Richie Burke; suspended former Utah Royals FC head coach Craig Harrington and Sky Blue FC general manager Alyse LaHue until 2025; and conditionally suspended former coaches Farid Benstiti of OL Reign, former Houston Dash head coaches James Clarkson and Vera Pauw; and former Orlando Pride head coach Amanda Cromwell and her assistants Sam Greene and Aline Reis.

The league also fined the Red Stars $1.5 million, Portland Thorns FC $1 million, Racing Louisville FC $200,000, North Carolina Courage $100,000, OL Reign $50,000, and NJ/NY Gotham FC (formerly Sky Blue FC) $50,000. It also required North Carolina and Louisville to hire a sporting staff independent of its men's teams.
