= Mana Shim =

American soccer player (born 1991)

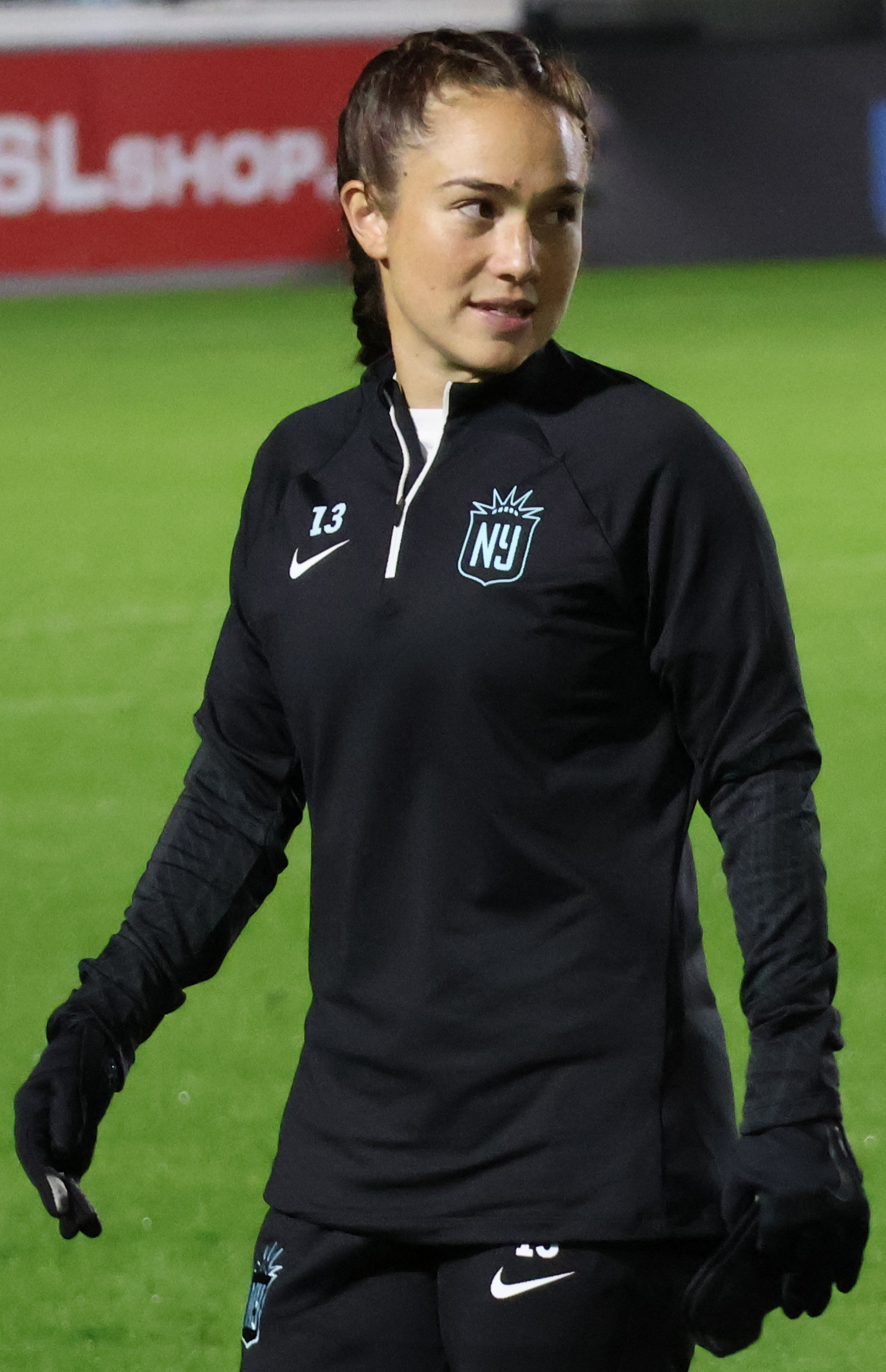
- Shim with Gotham in 2023

Personal information
- Full name: Meleana Lokahi Shim
- Date of birth: September 25, 1991 (age 35)
- Place of birth: Honolulu, Hawaii, U.S.
- Height: 5 ft 4 in (1.63 m)
- Position: Midfielder

Youth career
- Ho'okalakupua

College career
Years	Team	Apps	(Gls)
2009–2012	Santa Clara Broncos		

Senior career*
Years	Team	Apps	(Gls)
2013–2017	Portland Thorns FC	76	(9)
2015	→ Iga Kunoichi FC (loan)	6	(2)
2017	Växjö DFF	2	(0)
2018–2019	Houston Dash	8	(0)
2023–24	NJ/NY Gotham FC	5	(0)

International career^{‡}
2012	United States U23	4	(0)

Managerial career
- 2022: San Jose State Spartans (assistant)
- * Club domestic league appearances and goals as of October 27, 2026 ‡ National team caps and goals as of April 10, 2013

Meleana Lokahi "Mana" Shim (born September 25, 1991) is an athlete advocate and former American women's soccer player. Shim played as a midfielder and spent most of her senior career with Portland Thorns FC of the National Women's Soccer League (NWSL). After the revelations of the Yates Report in 2022, Shim was named chairperson of a new Participant Safety Taskforce at U.S. Soccer.

== Early life ==
Shim grew up in Honolulu, Hawaii, where she attended Kamehameha Kapalama High School and helped the soccer team to three Interscholastic League of Honolulu championships. In 2007, the team won the state championship.

Shim also played for the club soccer team Ho'okalakupua. In 2003 and 2005, the team was Region IV Finalists. In 2004, 2006, and 2007, the team was Region IV semi-finalists. In 2008, they won gold at the Surf Cup U19 Championship.

=== Santa Clara Broncos ===
Shim attended Santa Clara University from 2009 to 2012 where she was a three-year starting midfielder for the Broncos. As a freshman in 2009, she played in 20 of the squad's 23 matches. She finished the year with 21 shots, including seven during the Broncos' three NCAA Tournament matches. During her second year, Shim played in all 22 games, one of only four Broncos to do so, starting 18 matches for a total of 1,660 minutes played. She scored one goal and added three assists and was named an All-West Coast Conference honorable mention. As a junior in 2011, she started all 21 games and tallied four goals and four assists. She was named to the All-WCC Second-Team.

== Playing career ==
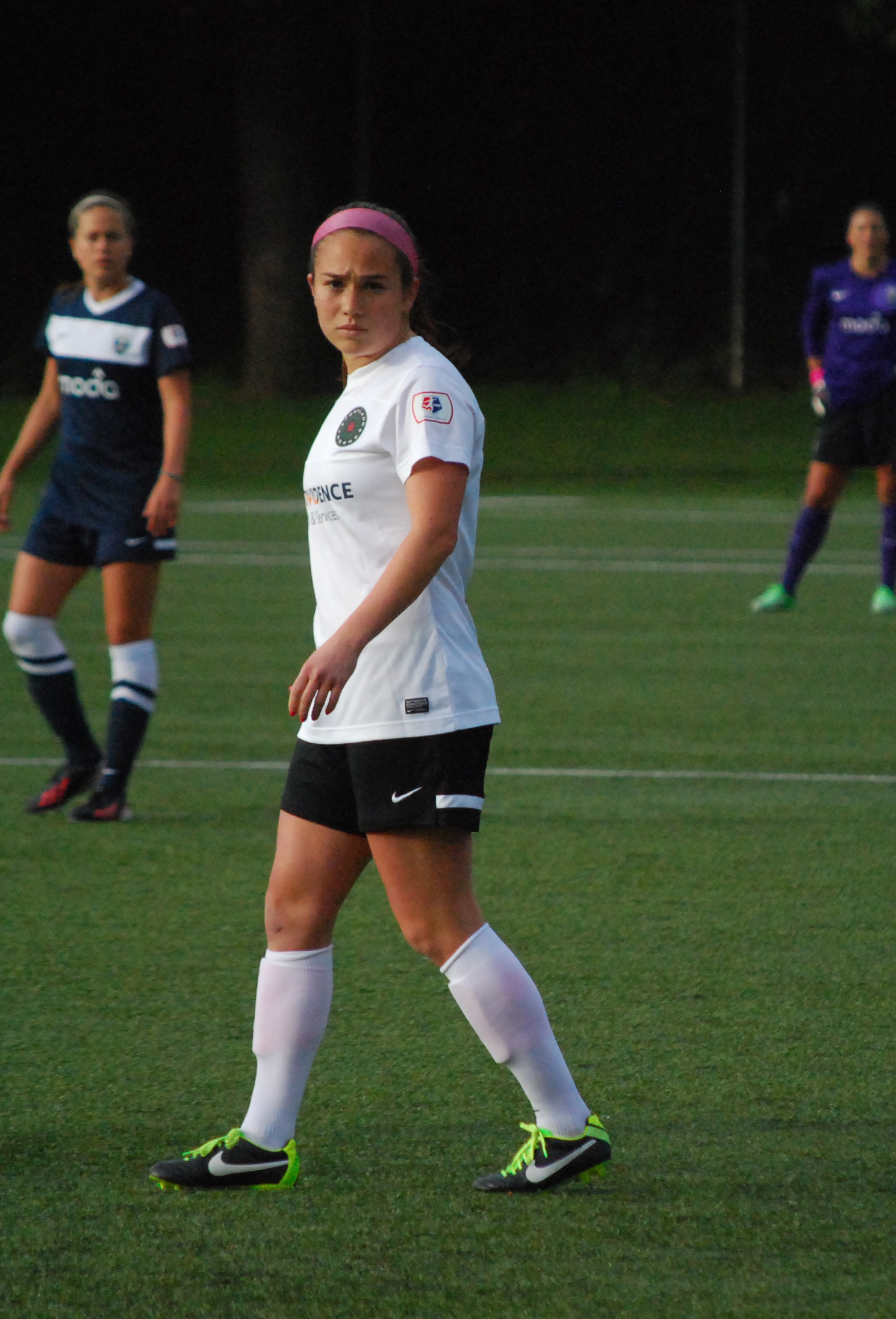
Shim in 2013

=== Portland Thorns (2013–17) ===
Shim signed with the Portland Thorns FC as a discovery player for the inaugural season of the National Women's Soccer League. She made her debut for the team during a match against the Washington Spirit on May 4, 2013. She scored her first professional goal on June 16, 2013, at Jeld-Wen Field (now Providence Park) in a match against Seattle Reign FC. After receiving a through-ball from teammate Angie Kerr near the penalty spot, Shim finished with a left-footed shot past the goalkeeper. She also served her first assist during the match after stealing the ball off a bad pass and passing it to forward Danielle Foxhoven, who was making a run into the penalty box. She was the Thorns' lone scorer in a 1–1 draw with the Western New York Flash on July 14, 2013, which began a scoring streak in which she scored a goal in four consecutive matches. Shim started both playoff games in 2013, which the Thorns won to win the NWSL Championship.

On January 10, 2014, it was announced that Shim was selected by the Houston Dash with the fourth pick in the 2014 NWSL Expansion Draft. She was traded back to the Thorns one week later during the 2014 NWSL College Draft.

In 2016, Shim played in 8 games, starting 4, as the Thorns won the NWSL Shield. In 2017 she appeared in 6 games, starting 3, and departed the team in August.

=== Igo Kunoichi (2015) ===
In 2015, Shim went on loan to Iga Kunoichi FC of Japan's Nadeshiko League.

=== Växjö DFF (2017) ===
In 2017, Shim signed with Swedish side Växjö DFF of the Elitettan. She appeared in two matches as Växjö earned promotion to the 2018 Damallsvenskan.

=== Houston Dash (2018–19) ===
Shim returned to the NWSL in 2018, signing with the Dash and playing in 8 games.

=== NJ/NY Gotham FC (2023–24) ===
Shim signed a short-term injury replacement contract with NJ/NY Gotham FC on June 25, 2023 and played in five games that year. One of her teammates was fellow 2021 NWSL abuse scandal whistleblower Sinead Farrelly. In an NWSL Challenge Cup game on August 9, 2023, Shim scored her first NWSL goal since 2015 in the 91st minute off an assist from Midge Purce. In 2024 she signed another short-term contract and started and played 90 minutes in the final of the NWSL x Liga MX Femenil Summer Cup. Shim retired following that season, though she did not publicly announce this until later.

== Coaching career ==
Shim was an assistant coach at San Jose State University for the 2022–2023 season, during which the Spartans won the Mountain West Championship game.

== Activism and post-playing career ==
After leaving Houston in 2019, Shim enrolled in the William S. Richardson School of Law at the University of Hawai'i, graduating in 2022.

In 2021 Shim publicly accused her former manager Paul Riley of sexual misconduct and abuse to The Athletic in a story that resulted in Riley being fired from his then-current position as head coach of the North Carolina Courage, and the NWSL to seek further investigations. Her anti-harassment advocacy led to her being named one of the 2022 "Law Students of the Year" by National Jurist.

On October 31, 2022, following the revelations about the abuse in the Yates Report, Shim announced she was joining U.S. Soccer as the chair of a new Participant Safety Taskforce.

In 2024 she joined Accelerate Strategies, a consulting firm working "at the intersection of sports, politics and athlete well-being."

== Personal life ==
Shim is Kānaka Maoli (Native Hawai'ian).

Shim publicly came out as a lesbian on August 30, 2013, in an interview with Outsports, the day before the Portland Thorns FC entered the National Women's Soccer League Championship.

In 2017, as part of an effort to lower the stigma of mental health issues among athletes, Shim revealed she had been diagnosed with bipolar disorder.

== Honors ==
=== As a player ===
Portland Thorns FC

- NWSL Championship: 2013
- NWSL Shield: 2016

NJ/NY Gotham FC

- NWSL Championship: 2023

=== As a coach ===
- Mountain West Conference championship, 2023 (assistant coach)
