= Kaiya McCullough =

American soccer player

Personal information
- Full name: Kaiya June McCullough
- Date of birth: May 29, 1998 (age 28)
- Place of birth: Irvine, California
- Height: 1.73 m (5 ft 8 in)
- Position: Defender

Youth career
- El Toro HS
- San Diego Surf

College career
Years	Team	Apps	(Gls)
2016–2019	UCLA Bruins	92	(1)

Senior career*
Years	Team	Apps	(Gls)
2020	Washington Spirit	0	(0)
2020	Würzburger Kickers	2	(0)

International career^{‡}
2016	United States U-18		
2017	United States U-19		
2018	United States U-20		
- * Club domestic league appearances and goals as of December 5, 2020 ‡ National team caps and goals as of September 8, 2020

Kaiya June McCullough (born May 29, 1998) is an American professional soccer player who formerly played as a defender for Würzburger Kickers of the German 2. Frauen-Bundesliga. She also previously played for National Women's Soccer League (NWSL) club Washington Spirit.

== Club career ==
=== Washington Spirit ===
Washington Spirit drafted McCullough with the 32nd overall pick in the 2020 NWSL College Draft. She subsequently signed with the team on February 10, 2020.

On September 7, 2020, Washington Spirit announced that they have waived McCullough so that she could pursue opportunities overseas. It later became known that a large part of her exit was motivated by verbal abuse and racism she faced under coach Richie Burke.

== Personal life and activism ==
Following former NFL quarterback Colin Kaepernick, McCullough has been kneeling during the US National Anthem to protest police brutality and racism since 2017.

Since joining the NWSL, McCullough has been one of the most vocal players against racism in the league. She had a large role in organizing the league players' support for Black Lives Matter, especially during the 2020 NWSL Challenge Cup.

In August 2021, McCullough was joined by many former Washington Spirit teammates with allegations of abuse against coach Richie Burke. McCullough described Burke as belligerent and aggressive, and also claimed he made many racist and otherwise bigoted comments towards her and her teammates. The Washington Spirit fired Burke in September. Burke's firing amidst the 2021 NWSL abuse scandal put into question the abusive behaviors of many coaches in the NWSL and worldwide, and played a large role in the ousting of League Commissioner Lisa Baird.
