= Sexual harassment in the NWSL =

Allegations of abuse during the 2021 NWSL season

Players and former staff of teams in the National Women's Soccer League (NWSL) have leveled several allegations and formal reports of sexual abuse, harassment, misconduct, and manipulation, as well as weight-shaming, verbal and emotional abuse, and racist and sexist remarks across its history. These allegations of crossing professional boundaries with players have led to formal investigations of and by the NWSL and many of its teams and coaches, most prominently during the league's 2021 season but including events dating to the league's inception and extending to its present.

== Proposed causes and ramifications ==
In the findings of former US attorney general Sally Yates' report regarding an investigation commissioned by the United States Soccer Federation, she wrote that "abuse in the NWSL is rooted in a deeper culture in women's soccer, beginning in youth leagues, that normalizes verbally abusive coaching and blurs boundaries between coaches and players."

The investigations ultimately concluded that multiple forms of emotional abuse and sexual misconduct occurred across various teams and seasons; they impacted many teams, coaches, and players. This led to public protests by players and as a result, multiple coaches have been reprimanded for their behavior. Five out of 10 head coaches in the 2021 season were fired or stepped down due to misconduct allegations. Some of the more significant allegations include Coaches Riley, Dames, Burke, and Holly, who were banned from coaching and related activities in the NWSL.

Before the 14-month investigation into such allegations, there were no written rules to reprimand these coaches and other people of authority in the NWSL for gross misconduct. For the first nine years of its existence, The National Women's Soccer League operated without formal policies addressing misconduct and sexual harassment. Yet in the spring of 2021, the "Policy to Prevent and Eliminate Workplace Discrimination, Harassment, and Bullying" was implemented.

== 2021 abuse scandals ==
Throughout the 2021 National Women's Soccer League season, allegations of abuse surfaced in multiple teams across the National Women's Soccer League in the United States. As a result, head coaches for five of the 10 teams then in the league (Note: The NWSL expanded to 12 teams in 2022 with the entry of Angel City FC and San Diego Wave FC, 14 in 2024 with the entry of Bay FC and the current Utah Royals, and 16 in 2026 with the entry of Boston Legacy FC and Denver Summit FC. The league will add teams in Atlanta and Columbus in 2028.) resigned or were fired by the end of 2021, with league commissioner Lisa Baird also resigning due to the scandal. A later investigation led to four of these coaches receiving lifetime bans from league employment, and several other coaches and executives receiving lesser discipline.

=== Timeline ===
In July 2021, OL Reign announced that head coach Farid Benstiti had resigned, with the club stating that it had "great respect for Farid’s talents and all he brought to the organization." Later that year, it was reported that Benstiti had resigned following a number of complaints of abuse, including having disparaged players' nutritional habits and fitness. Later that month, NJ/NY Gotham FC announced that general manager Alyse LaHue had been fired following an investigation into a complaint of breaching league policy. Meg Linehan of The Athletic subsequently published an article reporting that the sacking was due to a breach of the league's anti-harassment policy in specific. LaHue's lawyer released a statement stating that LaHue "denies the allegations made against her."

In August, a number of former Washington Spirit players accused coach Richie Burke of abuse. Kaiya McCullough described Burke as belligerent and aggressive, and also claimed he made multiple racist and otherwise bigoted comments towards her and her teammates. Later in August, Racing Louisville FC announced that coach Christy Holly had been fired for cause, with local television station WDRB reporting that there had been complaints of a toxic culture.

In September, the Washington Spirit fired Burke. Later that month, Nadia Nadim, who had played for Gotham FC when it was known as Sky Blue FC, accused management of forging her signature on a contract extension so they could trade her to the Portland Thorns FC in early 2016.

In late-September, The Athletic published an investigation into North Carolina Courage head coach Paul Riley, alleging that Riley had sexually coerced and verbally abused players on his teams, specifically during the time period between 2011 and 2015 (consisting of his time in WPS, WPSL, and NWSL). More than a dozen players from every team Riley had coached since 2010 spoke to the publication and Sinead Farrelly and Mana Shim went on the record with allegations against him. In the article, Riley denied the allegations. The article also stated that NWSL failed to act on Riley's alleged abuses multiple times, including earlier in 2021 when the league declined to act on an offer from two of Riley's alleged victims to assist in investigating Riley's alleged abuses. Later that day, the Courage announced that Riley had been fired due to "very serious allegations of misconduct". The Portland Thorns released a statement the same day citing that some of the incidents occurred during Riley's two-year tenure as head coach of the Thorns in 2015 and discussing their reaction to the incidents at the time.

The next day, on October 1, the NWSL announced that, following discussions with the NWSLPA, all of its scheduled matches for that weekend were canceled. As well, both FIFA and U.S. Soccer announced they were starting their own investigations into Riley. The NWSL also announced that it would be launching its own investigation. That evening, league commissioner Lisa Baird announced her resignation. League general counsel Lisa Levine was also dismissed from her position. On October 4, the NWSLPA released a statement calling for the NWSL to make a number of reforms, including:

1. Every coach, manager, and owner to take part in an investigation into abuse;
2. The scope of the NWSL's investigation be expanded to included every club;
3. The scope of the NWSL's investigation be expanded to include the league administration;
4. That the league implement a "Step Back Protocol," where individuals who had been in a position of power when a person being investigated for abuse had been working under them be suspended;
5. That the NWSL release the details of internal reports into abuse;
6. That the NWSL co-operate with the NWSLPA;
7. That the NWSLPA be given a say in the hiring of the next league commissioner.

A number of Portland Thorns players also released a statement calling for Thorns general manager Gavin Wilkinson to be suspended. Wilkinson was subsequently put on administrative leave from the Thorns, but remained manager of the MLS Portland Timbers. Later in October, players interrupted several matches to link arms in a circle in the center of a field to protest against abuse. The protest was repeated by players in several leagues outside the United States, such as the FA Women's Super League, in a gesture of solidarity.

On October 18, the NWSL announced that Marla Messing had been appointed interim-commissioner. On October 29, the NWSLPA announced that the league had met all of the union's demands for reform. On October 30, Spirit president of sporting operations Larry Best announced his resignation from the club.

On November 22, just two days after losing to the Spirit in the NWSL championship final, the Chicago Red Stars announced that head coach Rory Dames had resigned effective immediately. Later that day, The Washington Post sports reporter Molly Hensley-Clancy reported that prior to resigning, The Post had approached the Red Stars Front Office with allegations from players, both previous and current, of abuse by Dames. The Post also provided documentation of reports made to United States Soccer Federation by players such as Christen Press as far back as 2014, detailing abuse, harassment, and inappropriate use of his power as head coach to manipulate players. “Three former Red Stars players, including one who played on the team at the time of the investigation, told The Post that they had wanted to speak to U.S. Soccer investigators but had never heard from them,” reported Hensley-Clancy. “Two had left the team because of Dames’s abuse, they said.” On November 24, the Red Stars ownership released a statement apologizing to "Christen Press, Jennifer Hoy, Samantha Johnson and those players who didn’t feel safe to come forward" and saying that "our club will require significant reflection and evaluation to ensure this does not happen again."

=== Investigations ===
==== Yates Report ====
The USSF commissioned former U.S. Deputy Attorney General Sally Yates to investigate the reported abuse and issued the results on October 3, 2022. The Yates Report included previously undisclosed information relating to the firing of Christy Holly. According to the report, he had sexually abused Racing player Erin Simon multiple times. (Note: Simon allowed herself to be publicly identified in the report.) The Yates Report also noted that multiple players who had been with Gotham FC (then Sky Blue FC) when Holly was that team's coach considered him "paranoid, ultra-aggressive, short-tempered, nasty, mean, patronizing, humiliating." Also, he was involved in a romantic relationship with then-Sky Blue captain Christie Pearce, with the Yates Report noting that according to the club's then-general manager Tony Nese, the relationship had become "so toxic and disruptive that he had 'lost the locker room'." Sky Blue had asked Holly to resign in 2017 over these issues, but the club termed his release "mutually agreed" in a press release.

The Yates Report also noted that Racing refused to fully cooperate with the investigation, saying "Racing Louisville FC refused to produce documents concerning Christy Holly and would not permit witnesses (even former employees) to answer relevant questions regarding Holly's tenure, citing non-disclosure and non-disparagement agreements it signed with Holly." The Red Stars and Thorns also did not fully cooperate with the Yates investigation.

Upon the release of the Yates Report, Portland Timbers and Thorns owner Merritt Paulson initially announced he, along with general manager Gavin Wilkinson and president Mike Golub, would step away from the Thorns. On October 5, 2022, Wilkinson and Golub were fired from the club altogether. On December 1, Paulson announced that he would sell the Thorns.

In October 2022, reacting to the Yates Report, journalist Sally Jenkins wrote a column in the Washington Post about the United States Center for SafeSport. She called SafeSport “a false front … little more than another coverup operation, a litigation-avoidance ploy and bottomless pit into which to dump complaints and disguise inaction.” In conclusion, she wrote that SafeSport is "abuser-friendly," and a sham.

==== NWSL/NWSLPA investigation ====
The joint NWSL/NWSLPA investigation led to the release of a separate report on December 14, 2022 that provided more details on abuses within multiple NWSL teams. Notably, this report pointed out that the NWSL's culture, forged in part by the fact that its two predecessor leagues had folded, discouraged players from reporting misconduct; in fact, the NWSL had not established a firm definition of "misconduct". It also noted that the league had failed to adequately vet technical staff. For example, Holly was hired by Racing despite lacking the required coaching licenses. The release of the NWSL/NWSLPA report led to the Houston Dash not renewing Clarkson's contract, which had expired at the end of the 2022 season.

On January 9, 2023, NWSL commissioner Jessica Berman handed down discipline based on the findings of the joint league–union report. Burke, Dames, Holly, and Riley received lifetime bans from participation in the league. Former Utah Royals head coach Craig Harrington and former Gotham GM Alyse LaHue drew two-year bans, with further conditions on subsequent NWSL employment. Clarkson and Cromwell would be allowed to return to the league upon completing anti-harassment training and demonstrating a commitment to change. Benstiti, Greene, former Orlando Pride goalkeeping coach Aline Reis, and former Houston Dash coach Vera Pauw must meet the same criteria to return to the NWSL.

=== Reactions ===
The scandal sparked intense debate, including over the structure of the NWSL, a lack of transparency within the NWSL, the ownership in the NWSL, and on abuse in women's and grassroots soccer on a wider scale.

NWSL Players Association executive director Meghann Burke said that there were "systemic issues that relate to who gets these coaching jobs, who is in positions of power." Orlando Pride and Canadian national team goalkeeper Erin McLeod said that NWSL players "are being underpaid, undervalued, which makes them feel desperate and like they're replaceable. And so when they're told to lock it up, not say anything, knowing they could be replaced by someone else in the next week, they aren't given much choice." Former Republic of Ireland women's national team player Ciara McCormack said that she had "heard countless accounts of harm in sport over the last few years" and that "powerful organizations masked this abusive behavior by these top coaches and both were allowed to waltz effortlessly into new roles in similar spaces within months of being accused of sexual misconduct against players." Former Spirit player Kaiya McCullough said that "you have these people who are abusers and who are bullies and they have unilateral control over other people's livelihoods" and called for "the big players to come out and support and to call things out for things to get done because they wield more power and when you're talking about these larger power structures, these intricate systems of power, it often takes people who wield some of that power to be able to impact what's happening."

Red Stars co-owner Sarah Spain described the scandal as 'devastating,' citing concerns about the institutional protection of abusive behavior because there’s money in it, because there’s success in it, because there’s prestige in it. And so people will default toward protecting an institution, and to see it happen in a women’s league is so infuriating," adding "how do you balance investing with sustainability?" The new interim league commissioner, Marla Messing, stated that it was necessary for the league to "make the changes that are fundamental to having a league where players feel valued and safe and feel like they are receiving the respect that they deserve."

Writing for NBC News, Britni de la Cretaz argued that homophobia within women's soccer had been under-discussed in reactions to the scandal, saying that, "while it’s true that it’s much more acceptable to be openly queer in women’s sports, there are plenty of examples that show it’s still not entirely safe," pointing to accusations of homophobia included in the claims of abuse against several of the NWSL teams. De la Cretaz further argued that "the reality is that even leagues known to be queer-friendly are often run by white, cishet men. As a result, they replicate — and enforce — existing systems of power and oppression."

=== Aftermath ===
Following the NWSL scandal, a number of abuse allegations surfaced in national teams outside the United States. A week after The Athletic investigation into the North Carolina Courage, two dozen players from the Venezuela women's national team co-signed a statement saying they'd faced "abuse and harassment, physical, psychological and sexual" from former national team head coach Kenneth Zseremeta. Two former Australia women's national soccer team players, Lisa De Vanna and Rhali Dobson, also spoke out about abuse they had faced in their national team. Football Australia and Sport Integrity Australia subsequently announced they would be launching an investigation into the claims.

The NWSL also indefinitely suspended two head coaches during the 2022 NWSL season under protective policies newly enacted in the aftermath: Houston Dash head coach and general manager James Clarkson, on April 27, 2022, by recommendation of the joint league and players association investigation into league-wide misconduct initiated in October 2021; and Orlando Pride head coach Amanda Cromwell, as well as assistant coach Sam Greene, on June 7, 2022, as subjects of a new joint league and players association investigation into allegations of retaliation.

Weeks after the NWSL enacted suspensions against coaches on January 9, 2023, former Red Stars youth club affiliate Chicago Empire FC re-hired suspended coach Craig Harrington as an independent contractor for a role listed on its website as director of coaching. Harrington had also been suspended from youth soccer participation in Illinois by the Illinois Youth Soccer Association (IYSA) for the same period as the NWSL's suspension. IYSA investigated Harrington's employment upon learning about it, and after confirming it communicated on April 25 Harrington's disqualification to him, Empire FC, the IWSL, the United States Youth Soccer Association, and U.S. Soccer.

In a statement, Empire FC claimed that Harrington had passed checks with SafeSport and was not on U.S. Soccer's risk management list, though U.S. Soccer disputed the latter claim.

Hours after a report published on May 5, 2023 in The Athletic publicized Harrington's employment at Empire FC, the Red Stars fired its general manager Michelle Lomnicki, who had been a staff coach for two girls' teams at Empire FC prior to being named the Red Stars's general manager in January 2023, and whose husband is Empire FC's sporting director. The Red Stars published a statement claiming Lomnicki was fired for a "lapse in judgment to not share important information with club leadership".

== Rory Dames ==
Before Rory Dames became the head coach of the NWSL's Chicago Red Stars, he previously coached at St Viator High School and for a youth soccer club named "The Eclipse Select Soccer Club". Dames was hired to coach the Chicago Red Stars based on his reputation at his previous youth club, as the team never performed a background check.

In 1998 a former player at St. Viator High School reported that Dames, her coach at the time, allegedly touched her upper thigh inappropriately. This occurred when the player was a minor and Dames was 25 years old. Dames was reported for regularly spend time with his young players outside of soccer alone, also making degrading and sexual jokes. It was said that he would regularly sexualize the team environment as he brought up comments about foreplay, oral sex, or their "sex lives" to his youth players. Dames was accused of sexual misconduct by several youth players in his soccer school throughout the 1990s and early 2000s. One of the accusations being that Dames started "grooming" her when she was 14 years old, as he waited until she was 18 years of age to pursue a sexual relationship. She told Hensley-Clancy, a reporter for The Washington Post, that "The way the relationship formed made her feel there was no way out". Megan Cnota, a former player for Dames’ club, was interviewed about Dames’ behavior. She stated that she and others have tried to bring the public's attention to it but nobody believed them.

During Dames’ time coaching for the Chicago Red Stars, players filed many complaints about him. One of the national team stars complained that "He does not have a safe distance between himself and his players." He uses his power and status as the coach to manipulate players and get close to them." In 2014, national team players reported two coaches, one of the two being Dames. Eventually, they were told by the public that they were trying to shut the league down. In total, 14 former players of Dames have reported accounts of either sexually, verbally, or emotionally abusive behavior towards them.

On November 21, 2021, Dames decided to resign from his position as head coach of the Red Stars.

== Erin Simon and Christy Holly ==
Erin Simon is a former American Women's soccer player on Gotham FC and Racing Louisville FC. On August 31, 2021, Christy Holly, former Gotham FC and Racing Louisville FC coach, was officially reported for sexual misconduct to the Yates Investigation Team. The Yates Report is the official investigation led by Sally Q. Yates, covering emotional abuse and sexual misconduct in the National Women's Soccer League (NWSL). This document, released on October 2, 2022, includes information about Holly's conduct towards Simon, as well as other cases of mistreatment of players in the NWSL. The Covington and Weil Report came out on December 14, 2022, and includes additional information about sexual and emotional damage in the NWSL.

After serving as a volunteer coach, Holly became head coach of Gotham FC (formerly known as Sky Blue FC) in 2016. He did not obtain a coaching license. The first interaction between Simon and Holly, reported by the Covington Report and Weil Report, was when Holly offered Simon a position on Gotham FC after Simon graduated from college. However, neither remained part of the team for long. Media sources and the Yates Investigation Team reported that Holly was fired in 2017 because of his sexual relationship with former Gotham FC defender, Christie Pearce, as well as his increase in verbal abuse towards players. After Holly left because of these accusations, he took a position as the head coach for Racing Louisville FC, despite Holly lacking the license that the United States Soccer Federation required for an NWSL head coach.

The second interaction between Holly and Simon was when Holly helped Simon advance her career a year later. Simon left Gotham FC and signed with an English club, West Ham United Women FC. Simon said Holly's connections helped Simon with this achievement. However, media sources report that Holly's gestures changed from appropriate to inappropriate in the summer of 2018. When Holly started training Simon during her offseason, he began to send her inappropriate text messages, including nude photographs and videos. Actions progressed, as Holly allegedly grabbed Simon's breasts while she was making smoothies in his house. Pearce was allegedly present during this incident, but she did not see it. Media sources also report that during the United States Women's National Team Under 23 camp, Holly invited Simon to his hotel room. However, it was reported that Simon declined the offer.

In August 2020, Holly was offered a position to be the head coach of Racing Louisville FC. In November 2020, Simon was drafted to play for Racing Louisville. Media sources say that Simon reached out to Holly, saying that since she began to play for him, he had to stop his inappropriate behavior and messaging.

Media sources state that Holly's sexual assault towards Simon, however, did not end when he became head coach. When watching game film with Simon, Holly would allegedly show her pornography while touching himself and Simon sexually. It was reported that Simon tried to ask Holly to watch the game film in more open places, but he would refuse and, once again, touch Simon forcefully. Additionally, the Yates Investigation Team reported that Holly would touch Simon inappropriately for every unsuccessful pass she made. Allegedly, Holly would also text Simon, expressing interest in visiting her apartment and describing what he would do to her. Media sources report that when Holly would send Simon explicit photographs, he also requested that she send photographs of herself in return.

Holly has not been charged with a crime for allegedly sexually assaulting Simon. In January 2023, NWSL permanently banned Holly and fined Racing Louisville FC $200,000. Racing Louisville FC gave Holly a severance of $14,000 and asked him to leave his apartment because he lived near Simon. Racing Louisville FC signed a non-disclosure and non-disparagement with Holly, which meant that neither Holly nor the club could make public statements about the situation. If either side did, they would have to pay the other $5,000. The Yates Investigation team did not get any documents or hear from any witnesses from Racing Louisville FC regarding the situation because of the agreement. On October 5, 2022, the president of Racing Louisville FC, James O’Connor, said that the club "will cooperate with the ongoing NWSL/NWSLPA joint investigation." Media sources say that players on Racing Louisville FC do not believe a non-disclosure agreement was necessary because the club could have publicly stated that Holly was accused of sexual harassment, without saying Simon's name. Simon agreed to the Yates Investigation Team using her name in the report and said, "This report allows our voices to finally be heard and is the first step toward achieving the respectful workplace we all deserve." After leaving Racing Louisville FC, Simon went on to play for English club Leicester City Women FC. On July 7, 2023, Simon announced her retirement.

== Paul Riley: Farrelly and Shim ==
Paul Riley, a former football player from England, became a prominent coach for his success in the Women's Professional Soccer (WPS), now known as the National Women's Soccer League (NWSL). Throughout Riley's coaching career, he faced many controversies, particularly cases of sexual assault and harassment. Accusations surfaced of Riley engaging in sexual coercion with his players which were published in an article from The Athletic published in September 2021. After disclosing these accusations, Riley was dismissed from his managerial position with the North Carolina Courage.

In 2011, midfielder Sinead Farrelly was drafted into the NWSL by the Philadelphia Independence, at the time coached by Paul Riley. Initially seen as having great potential, according to reports from The Athletic, Farrelly received special attention from Riley during her rookie season. This attention led to the lines between player and coach being blurred, as Riley allegedly started asking her more personal questions, buying her drinks, and giving numerous compliments. After a loss in the 2011 WPS championship, Farrelly alleges that Riley pressured her into a sexual encounter in his hotel room.

In December 2013, Paul Riley was hired as the new coach of the Portland Thorns. Shortly after his hiring in January 2014, the Portland Thorns traded for Sinead Farrelly. During her first season with the Thorns, Farrelly began dating one of her teammates. Upon learning this, Riley allegedly made derogatory comments towards Farrelly, stating that she was "too hot to be a lesbian"

On January 10, 2014 Houston Dash drafted Thorns midfielder Meleana Shim. Shim tells Riley she wants to stay in Portland. On the 17th, Thorns traded college draft picks to keep Shim. Riley stated "Since Houston drafted her, our priority had been to get her back."

In July 2014, towards the end of a match against the Chicago Red Stars, Farrelly collapsed on the field. After a brain scan, Farrelly was told the reason for her collapsing was migraines, but later Riley stated, "I realize now I was not okay. I couldn’t function under him (Riley)." Farrelly would remain sidelined for the remainder of the 2014 season.

In May 2015, following a home match, Riley personally invited Farrelly and a teammate to his apartment. At his apartment, Riley reportedly made sexual comments toward both Farrelly and her teammate, then requested that they kiss each other. He promised to spare the team fitness drills later in the week if they complied.

During the NWSL preseason in 2015, Thorns manager Gavin Wilkinson told midfielder Mana Shim to be a closeted player (In reference to her coming out in August 2013). Shim says during the 2014 season, head coach Paul Riley "made her feel small," verbally berated her and [...] other players, commented on her weight, and [used both][...] praise and criticism to make players compete for his favor.

On May 9, 2015, after a game in Portland, Thorns players and coaches go to a bar. Riley tells the bartender to "Get the girls whatever they want" with his card. The assistant coach leaves, Riley gives the players more drinks. Shim told E60, Riley asked to dance with her, and came up behind her trying to grind on her. Returning from the restroom, Riley allegedly asks Shim and Farelly if they ever hook up. He asks them to kiss each other and adds an incentive: the team will not have to do "the suicide mile" at next training. Shim needs to use the restroom while walking back. Riley offers his apartment.

In June 2015, While traveling to a game in Houston on June 5, Riley asks Shim to watch game film in his hotel room. Shim tells Farrelly that Riley continues to make her uncomfortable since the bar incident in May: He texts her more and has asked her to dinners alone. She shows Farelly a photo sent from Riley - when he asked her to his hotel room - of him only in compression shorts. Farrelly says Riley sent her similar photos when he coached her in her former club. Shim goes to Riley's room to review film. She opens the door to him in only white briefs, she told E60. He allegedly "tells Shim to get on his bed to watch film" when there was no film ready. Shim excuses herself.

That same year on July 5, Shim tells her teammate Alex Morgan about Riley. Morgan tries to help Shim file an anonymous complaint. At the time there was no procedure to do so. Shim emails Riley expressing how she "felt uncomfortable" and wants a professional relationship. She writes "We both know that your interactions with me have been inappropriate and it has negatively impacted me on the field,". Yates investigators say Riley deleted the email (and cleared his trash folder). Shim's playing time with the Thorns was reduced.

Shim files a formal complaint on September 16 to the Thorns about Riley's behavior (it includes more allegations than just May and June) Shim emails Wilkinson, club owner Paulson, Riley and Thorns HR director Nancy Garcia Ford about the incidents with Riley and forwards it to Jeff Plush, commissioner of the NWSL. Plush says the league will investigate.

After receiving the email, Plush forwards it to Levine with the comment, "See below. Not good." The investigation begins on the 17th; Up through the 22nd, Thorns HR director separately interviews Shim and Farelly. On the 18th, Levine is told there are emails and text messages: one text reads, "I am so horny I want to f— you." She is also told Riley asked two players to kiss in front of him. Ford interviews Shim and Farrelly. Following the incident, Ford generates a report on Shim's complaint. Thorn's counsel emails Levine a copy and expresses how it does not use the word "sexual" or "harassment," does not reveal "unlawful harassment" (even though the report itself does not consider the lawfulness of Riley's actions) does not include many allegations, and describes Shim as accusing Riley of "inappropriate behavior." But, the Thorns Report includes alleged details such as Shim and Farrelly kissing in front of Riley. The Thorns fire Riley due to the investigation. They publicly announce Riley will no longer coach but refrain from saying why.

In October later that year, Farrelly was traded from the Portland Thorns to the Boston Breakers. Following the trade, Farrelly emailed Wilkinson on October 3, disappointed with how Thorns handled the allegations. Her email mentioned how the events with Riley, "have drastically changed [her] life and career…"

In January 2016 NWSL team, The Western New York Flash, considered Riley as new head coach. During a consult with Vice president of the Flash, Aaran Lines, Wilkinson tells him they should hire Riley. Wilkinson says he "would hire him in a heartbeat." He mentions Shim's allegations, but indicates she is a "disgruntled player" who put Riley "in a bad position" per the Yates report.

Continuing into March 2021 of Riley is still coaching in the NWSL. Shim sent her complaint from 2015 on March 15 to Baird, Plush's successor as NWSL commissioner, and requested a new investigation as well as information on next steps the NWSL may take to provide players protection. Baird replies on March 16 but ignores the request to reinvestigate. Shim follows up on her request on the 17th. Baird does not reply.

In April, Shim emails Baird and makes herself available for an interview. Baird replies to Shim saying her complaint was "investigated to conclusion" and cannot share other details.

On May 3, through its newly implemented reporting process, the NWSL received an anonymous report about Riley's behavior. Baird replies to Farrelly on the 5th (just as she did Shim) saying the initial complaint was investigated to conclusion and cannot share details.

In September 2021, Shim and Farelly share their experiences with Riley in an article published by The Athletic. Riley denies the allegations of predatory sexual harassment, coercion, etc. The Courage fire Riley. Baird says she is "shocked and disgusted to read the new allegations [...] in The Athletic." In response, Alex Morgan shares screenshots of Baird and Farrelly's emails. In August 2022, the Oregonian's report states the 2015 Thorns investigation "wasn't in line with modern standards of sexual misconduct allegations." It clears Wilkinson of wrongdoings from 2014 and describes the comment on Shim's sexuality as a "misunderstanding."

Shim responds in September and states there was no misunderstanding and it was very clear Wilkinson told her to stop being open with her sexuality.

On October 3, the yearlong investigation by Sally Yates is released. the Yates Report concluded that the Thorns refused to share their 2015 investigation into Riley, interfered with witness accounts, and that Paulson failed to act on warnings about Riley. According to the Yates Report, players alleged that Paulson and Wilkinson made sexist, demeaning, and inappropriate comments to Thorns players and female staff.

== See also ==
- National Women's Soccer League
- USA Gymnastics sex abuse scandal
