= Downtown South =

Development project in Raleigh, North Carolina

- Interactive map of Downtown South
- Location: South of Downtown Raleigh, Raleigh, North Carolina
- Coordinates: 35°45′21.4″N 78°38′42.2″W
- Status: Site Prep
- Website: https://www.visitdowntownsouth.com/

Companies
- Architect: 10 Design
- Developer: Kane Realty

Technical details
- Cost: US$2.2 billion
- Size: 140 acres (57 ha)

Downtown South is a proposed 140-acre (57 ha) real estate development by Kane Realty located to the south of downtown Raleigh, North Carolina. Anchored by a soccer stadium and VR center, the US$2.2 billion project could feature as many as 23 high-rise structures with office, residential, hotel, and retail spaces. The first phase includes the construction of a 24-story apartment building and 27-story office tower. Later phases could include buildings as tall as 40 stories.

In the event Raleigh wins the bid for the 2029 World University Games, it is likely that some events will be hosted at the Downtown South development. In addition, office space, hotel space, conference rooms, and the VR facility may be used for supporting infrastructure.

== Sports and entertainment ==
Across its 140 acres, the Downtown South is expected to be home to a soccer practice facility, 20,000-seat stadium, small outdoor amphitheater, and an indoor VR Center.

Steve Malik began to collaborate with Kane Realty in 2018 hoping to attract Major League Soccer (MLS) to Raleigh. However, the MLS ultimately chose Charlotte, North Carolina, delaying the Downtown South development's construction. Despite the bid falling through, Malik still hopes to relocate the North Carolina FC and North Carolina Courage to the stadium upon its completion, but the stadium is on hold until further notice.

== Delays and lawsuits ==
The Downtown South development was paused due to the COVID-19 pandemic, affecting project finances, zoning requests, and blueprints.

Some residents were concerned about the displacement and harm the development could cause to the community. After the MLS chose Charlotte for the location of its 30th team, some doubted the continued need for the project. Raleigh City Council denied several proposals and requests, believing the rezoning application "disregarded equity and fairness." After a series of council meetings, the project was eventually approved on December 15, 2020, though the stadium was later put on hold.

After this approval, Kane Realty bought the remaining land needed for the project, which later resulted in a lawsuit against the project on March 30, 2021, by a small business located on the site. A hearing related to the lawsuit was scheduled before the NC Court of Appeals in February 2023.

As of January 2025, there was still no timeline for groundbreaking.

== Downtown South Music Venue ==
TBD
- Interactive map of TBD
- Address: Raleigh, North Carolina; United States
- Owner: Kane Realty
- Operator: Anschutz Entertainment Group
- Capacity: 3,500
- Type: performing arts center

Construction
- Opened: Fall 2024

Website
- www.visitdowntownsouth.com

The 3,500-seat entertainment venue will have an indoor ballroom and a rooftop entertainment space. It will have 70,000 square feet and will begin construction in 2023.

== 1727 S Saunders St ==
1727 S Saunders St.
- Interactive map of the 1727 S Saunders St. area

General information
- Status: Approved
- Type: Multi-Family & Retail
- Location: South of Downtown; Raleigh, North Carolina, United States of America
- Completed: 2025

Height
- Top floor: 292 ft (89 m)

Technical details
- Floor count: 24
- Floor area: 664,173 sq ft (61,703.7 m^{2})

Design and construction
- Architect: Cline Design Associates

1727 S Saunders St will be the first high-rise structure at Downtown South. The 24-story structure will include 370 residential units, 453 parking spaces, and approximately 14,000 square feet of retail space.
