= Sally Yates =

American attorney (born 1960)

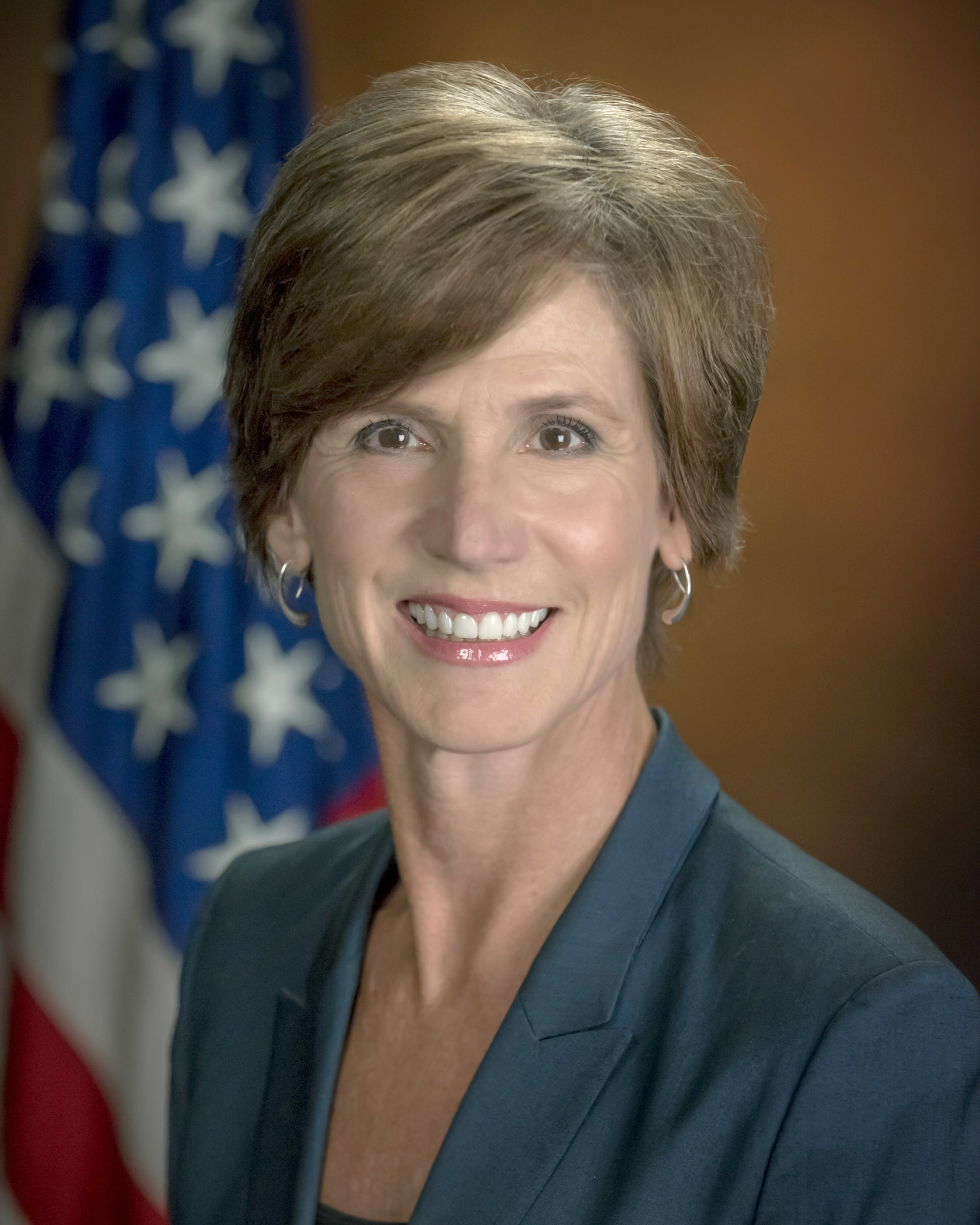

Acting United States Attorney General
- In office January 20, 2017 – January 30, 2017
- President: Donald Trump
- Deputy: Herself
- Preceded by: Loretta Lynch
- Succeeded by: Channing D. Phillips (acting)

36th United States Deputy Attorney General
- In office January 10, 2015 – January 30, 2017; Acting: January 10, 2015 – May 13, 2015
- President: Barack Obama; Donald Trump
- Preceded by: James M. Cole
- Succeeded by: Rod Rosenstein

United States Attorney for the Northern District of Georgia
- In office March 10, 2010 – January 10, 2015
- President: Barack Obama
- Preceded by: David Nahmias
- Succeeded by: John A. Horn
- In office July 1, 2004 – December 1, 2004; Acting
- President: George W. Bush
- Preceded by: William S. Duffey Jr.
- Succeeded by: David Nahmias

Personal details
- Born: Sally Caroline Quillian; August 20, 1960 (age 66) Atlanta, Georgia, U.S.
- Party: Democratic
- Spouse: Comer Yates
- Children: 2
- Education: University of Georgia (BA, JD)

Sally Quillian Yates (born Sally Caroline Quillian; August 20, 1960) is an American lawyer. From 2010 to 2015, she was United States Attorney for the Northern District of Georgia. In 2015, she was appointed United States Deputy Attorney General by President Barack Obama. Following the inauguration of President Donald Trump and the departure of Attorney General Loretta Lynch at noon on January 20, 2017, Yates served as acting United States Attorney General for 10 days.

Trump dismissed Yates for insubordination on January 30, after she instructed the Justice Department not to make legal arguments defending Executive Order 13769, which temporarily banned the admission of refugees and barred travel from certain Muslim-majority countries (later to include North Korea and Venezuela) on the grounds that terrorists were using the U.S. refugee resettlement program to enter the country. The ban was labeled as a "Muslim ban" by both Trump and his campaign's website. Rather than defend it, Yates stated the order was neither defensible in court nor consistent with the Constitution. Although large portions of the order were initially blocked by federal courts, the Supreme Court ultimately upheld a revised version in Trump v. Hawaii (2018).

Following her dismissal, Yates returned to private practice.

== Early life ==
Yates was born in Atlanta, Georgia, to John Kelley Quillian (1930–1986), an attorney and judge on the Georgia Court of Appeals between 1966 and 1984, and his wife, Xara "Mickey" DeBeaugrine Quillian (née Terrell; 1931–2012), an interior designer. Her grandmother had been one of the first women admitted to the Georgia Bar; however, she was not hired as an attorney, instead working as a legal secretary for Yates's grandfather.

Yates went to Dunwoody High School and attended the University of Georgia, receiving her Bachelor of Arts degree in journalism in 1982. In 1986, she earned a Juris Doctor degree from the University of Georgia School of Law, graduating magna cum laude. While in law school, Yates was the executive editor of the Georgia Law Review.

== Career ==
In 1986, Yates was admitted to the State Bar of Georgia. From 1986 to 1989, Yates was an associate at the law firm King & Spalding in Atlanta, specializing in commercial litigation.

=== Federal prosecutor ===
In 1989, Yates was hired as assistant U.S. attorney by Bob Barr for the U.S. Attorney's Office for the Northern District of Georgia. Early in her career at the Department of Justice, Yates prosecuted a variety of types of cases including white-collar fraud and political corruption. In 1994, she became chief of the Fraud and Public Corruption Section. She was the lead prosecutor in the case of Eric Rudolph, who committed the Centennial Olympic Park bombing, a terrorist convicted for a series of anti-abortion and anti-gay bombings across the southern United States between 1996 and 1998, which killed two people and injured over 120 others. She rose to first assistant U.S. attorney in 2002 and to acting U.S. attorney in 2004. In the U.S. attorney's office, she held leadership positions under both Republican and Democratic administrations.

President Barack Obama nominated Yates to be U.S. attorney in the Northern District of Georgia. She was confirmed by the Senate on March 10, 2010. Yates was the first woman to hold the position. During her time as a U.S. attorney, Yates was appointed by Attorney General Eric Holder to be vice chair of the Attorney General's Advisory Committee.

=== Deputy attorney general ===
On May 13, 2015, the United States Senate voted 84–12 (4 not voting) to confirm Yates as deputy attorney general of the United States, the second-highest-ranking position in the Justice Department; during her confirmation hearing, when questioned by Senator Jeff Sessions if she would disobey a president's unlawful orders, she responded that she would have an obligation to follow the law and the Constitution, and to give independent legal advice to the president. She served under Attorney General Loretta Lynch, who took office shortly before Yates's confirmation.

As deputy attorney general, Yates was responsible for the day-to-day operations of the Justice Department, which included approximately 113,000 employees. In 2015, she authored the policy, known as the "Yates memo", prioritizing the prosecution of executives for corporate crimes. During the final days of the Obama administration, she oversaw the review of 16,000 petitions for executive clemency, making recommendations to the president.

=== Acting attorney general ===
In January 2017, according to a Justice Department spokesman, Yates accepted a request from the incoming Trump administration to be acting attorney general, beginning on January 20, 2017, and until the successor for Attorney General Lynch would be confirmed by the Senate.

On January 5, 2017, Yates, together with then-FBI Director James Comey, then-CIA Director John Brennan, and then-Director of National Intelligence James Clapper briefed Obama on Russia-related matters in the Oval Office. In subsequent days of the new presidency, Yates warned the Trump administration that National Security Advisor Michael Flynn had not been truthful about his contacts with Russia related to sanctions and that he was vulnerable to blackmail by Russian intelligence. Yates' warning was not immediately acted upon until it was leaked by a senior United States government official who unmasked Flynn during the last days of Obama administration to The Washington Post, which publicly reported her warning on February 13, 2017. Flynn resigned within hours.

Letter from Sally Yates explaining her view of Executive Order 13769

On January 27, 2017, President Trump signed Executive Order 13769, which restricted travel to the United States from seven Muslim majority countries, among other provisions. While the executive order had been approved as to "form and legality" by the Department of Justice's Legal Counsel, Yates ordered the Justice Department not to defend the order because she believed the order to be unlawful. Her decision came after several federal courts had issued stays on various parts of the order to stop their implementation, and many United States Customs and Border Protection agents had acted in defiance of those stays. In a letter to DOJ staff, Yates wrote:

At present, I am not convinced that the defense of the executive order is consistent with these responsibilities of the Department of Justice, nor am I convinced that the executive order is lawful...I am responsible for ensuring that the positions we take in court remain consistent with this institution's solemn obligation to always seek justice and stand for what is right. For as long as I am the acting Attorney General, the Department of Justice will not present arguments in defense of th[is] executive order, unless and until I become convinced that it is appropriate to do so.

In a New York Times editorial published on July 28, 2017, Yates expressed concern about Trump's political influence on the Justice Department, writing "President Trump's actions appear aimed at destroying the fundamental independence of the Justice Department. ... Its investigations and prosecutions must be conducted free from any political interference or influence. ... The very foundation of our justice system—the rule of law—depends on it."

==== Dismissal ====
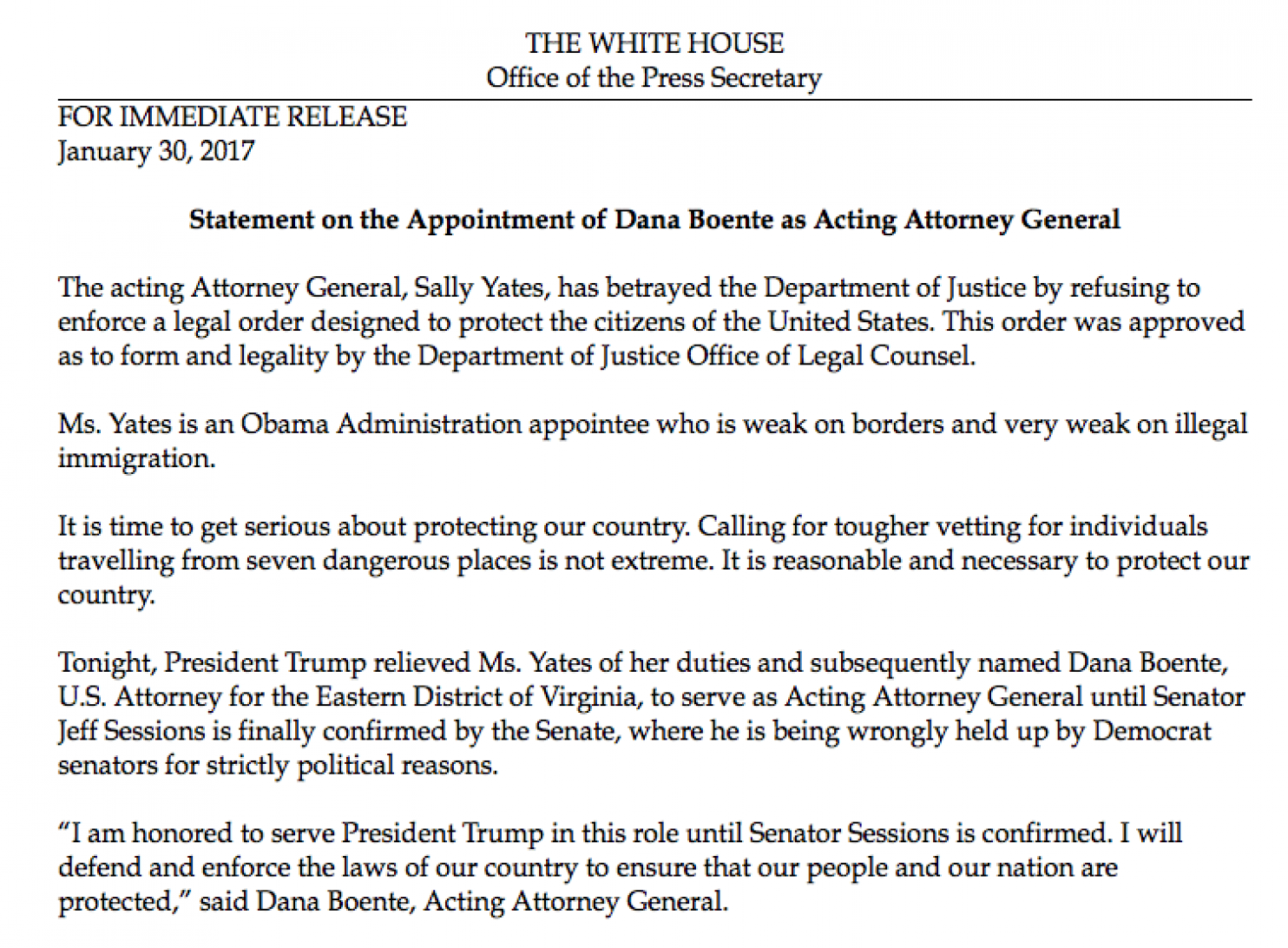
White House press release on the dismissal of Sally Yates

Upon announcing her decision not to defend the order, Yates was immediately dismissed by the Trump administration via hand-delivered letter, and replaced with Dana Boente, the United states attorney for the Eastern District of Virginia, later in the evening on January 30, 2017. Before President Donald Trump signed an executive order appointing Boente to replace Yates, Channing D. Phillips, the United States attorney for the District of Columbia, served as acting attorney general for a few hours that evening in the meantime pursuant to Executive Order 13762 titled "Providing an Order of Succession Within the Department of Justice" that was signed by President Barack Obama on January 13, 2017, and published in the Federal Register on January 19, 2017. After taking office, Boente ordered the Justice Department to enforce the executive order.

In a White House statement, Yates was said to have "betrayed the Department of Justice by refusing to enforce a legal order designed to protect the citizens of the United States" and to be "an Obama administration appointee who is weak on borders and very weak on illegal immigration."

Shortly thereafter, acting Immigration and Customs Enforcement director Daniel Ragsdale was demoted and replaced by Thomas Homan with Ragsdale remaining as deputy director.

==== Reactions ====
Some legal experts argued that Yates should have resigned, rather than directing the Justice Department not to defend the executive order, which Cato Institute scholar Josh Blackman called "a textbook case of insubordination". A number of legal scholars praised Yates for standing up against what they perceived as an unconstitutional executive order. Many also believed the rhetoric of "betrayal" Trump used in his letter was unnecessarily incendiary.

In response to her decision not to defend the order, former Attorney General Eric Holder tweeted that he trusted her judgment.

Senate Minority Leader Chuck Schumer called Yates' actions "a profile in courage. It was a brave act and a right act", while Rep. John Conyers criticized the decision to fire her: "If dedicated government officials deem [Trump's] directives to be unlawful and unconstitutional, he will simply fire them as if government is a reality show."

Law professor Jonathan Adler said, however, that "Yates did not claim she was convinced the order was unlawful, but only that it was not 'wise or just'" and that he was "not aware of any instance in which the Justice Department has refused to defend a presumptively lawful executive action on this basis". Adler argued that she should have resigned and publicly stated her reasons for doing so. It was reported that Yates considered and opted not to resign because she did not want to leave her successor facing the same question.

The editors of National Review said her defiance of the executive order was "inappropriate", since Yates was unelected and "every official in the Justice Department knows, if one disagrees with the law one is called upon to apply, or the policy one is bound to enforce, one is free to resign".

The New York Times and others drew comparisons to the 1973 Saturday Night Massacre, during the Watergate scandal, when Attorney General Elliot Richardson and Deputy Attorney General William Ruckelshaus resigned after refusing to carry out President Richard Nixon's order to dismiss special prosecutor Archibald Cox. Some cable networks began calling Yates' dismissal the "Monday Night Massacre". However, Watergate investigative journalist Carl Bernstein, speaking on CNN, rejected the comparison. "There's a big difference, because the Saturday Night Massacre was really about firing the attorney general when Nixon was the target of an investigation and was actively obstructing justice", he said. "I think the president is within his rights here to fire the attorney general, that he has that ability."

Representative Jackie Speier nominated Yates for the John F. Kennedy Profile in Courage Award. Georgia State Senator Elena Parent introduced a resolution commending Yates. Democratic Party operatives in Georgia began recruiting Yates to run for governor of Georgia in the 2018 election.

=== Testimonies ===
==== House Intelligence Committee ====
In March 2017, Yates was invited by the House Intelligence Committee to testify before Congress at a public hearing as part of the committee's "bipartisan, ongoing investigation into the Russian active measures campaign targeting the 2016 U.S. election".

Later the same month, however, The Washington Post published documents indicating that the Trump administration had sought to block her from testifying, including letters from the Justice Department to Yates indicating that the administration considers her possible testimony on the ouster of Flynn to be barred by the presidential communications privilege or deliberative process privilege.

The public hearing at which Yates had been set to testify was canceled by Chairman Devin Nunes, who said through his spokesperson that neither he nor anyone else in the committee had discussed Yates's testimony with the White House. White House Press Secretary Sean Spicer called The Washington Post story "false"; said that "the White House has taken no action to prevent Sally Yates from testifying" and that the White House had given its tacit consent; and added "I hope she testifies."

==== Senate Judiciary Committee ====
External videos
- Yates testifying before the U.S. Senate Judiciary Subcommittee on Crime and Terrorism, May 8, 2017, C-SPAN

On May 8, 2017, Yates and James Clapper testified for three hours before the Senate Judiciary's Subcommittee on Crime and Terrorism over the Russian interference in the 2016 U.S. election. Yates said the FBI interviewed then-National Security Advisor Michael T. Flynn on January 24, 2017. Because of that interview she made an "urgent" request to meet with White House Counsel Don McGahn. She met with him on January 26 and again on January 27. She informed McGahn that Flynn was "compromised" and possibly open to blackmail by the Russians. As previously reported, she told McGahn that Flynn had misled Vice President Mike Pence and other administration officials about the nature of his conversation with the Russian ambassador. She said Flynn's "underlying conduct", which she could not describe due to classification, "was problematic in and of itself", adding "(i)t was a whole lot more than one White House official lying to another".

=== Later career ===
After leaving the Justice Department, Yates became a lecturer at Georgetown University Law Center and returned to Atlanta as a partner at the Atlanta-based international law firm King & Spalding, where she had worked 30 years earlier. Yates' practice focuses on investigations.

Yates delivered a speech as part of the 2020 Democratic National Convention. On September 5, 2020, Yates was announced to be a member of the advisory council of the Biden-Harris Transition Team responsible for planning the presidential transition of Joe Biden. In November, Yates was named a candidate for United States attorney general in the Biden administration; however, Merrick Garland was ultimately nominated for the post.

In October 2021, Yates was hired by the United States Soccer Federation to oversee an investigation regarding abuse claims made by players from the National Women's Soccer League, whose Commissioner Lisa Baird resigned in wake of complaints of sexual improprieties against coaches, including English coaches Paul Riley and Richie Burke. The USSF, the national governing body for the sport (which had operated the NWSL before 2020), indicated that Yates would have "full autonomy" to pursue resolution of the allegations. The final report, issued and published in early October 2022, detailed widespread abuse, sexual coercion, and unprofessional behavior throughout the league, while noting that several teams and prominent league executives either deliberately interfered with the investigation process or refused to participate.

In October 2026, Yates was selected to lead an investigation into how Cornell University handles allegations of campus sexual assault.

== Honors ==
In January 2016, Yates received Emory University School of Law's Emory Public Interest Committee (EPIC) Inspiration Award. Following Yates's dismissal as Acting Attorney General, Representative Jackie Speier nominated her for the John F. Kennedy Profile in Courage Award, and Georgia State Senator Elena Parent introduced a resolution commending Yates. In April 2017, Yates received the Mary Church Terrell Freedom and Justice Award during the Detroit NAACP's 62nd Annual Fight for Freedom Fund Dinner.

== Personal life ==
Yates's husband, J. Comer Yates, is an executive director of the Atlanta Speech School and was awarded an honorary degree from Oglethorpe University in 2017. In 1994 and 1996, he unsuccessfully ran for Congress as a Democrat. The couple has two children, a daughter, Kelley Malone, and a son, James "Quill" Quillian.

Yates is a Democrat. At the Department of Justice she served under both Democratic and Republican administrations as a career civil servant. She was hired by Republican Bob Barr for her first DOJ position. When appointed deputy attorney general in 2014, Yates was described as well-regarded and non-political; her appointment was praised by Georgia's two senators, both Republicans. After Yates left the Justice Department, Democrats in Georgia sought to draft her as a candidate for governor in 2018; she declined to run.

Yates has written and spoken about suicide prevention, discussing her father's struggles with depression and his suicide in 1986.

Holly Hunter portrayed Yates in the 2020 TV miniseries The Comey Rule.

Legal offices
| Preceded by William S. Duffey Jr. | United States Attorney for the Northern District of Georgia; Acting; 2004 | Succeeded by David Nahmias |
| Preceded by David Nahmias | United States Attorney for the Northern District of Georgia; 2010–2015 | Succeeded by John A. Horn |
| Preceded by James Cole | United States Deputy Attorney General; 2015–2017 | Succeeded by Rod J. Rosenstein |
| Preceded by Loretta Lynch | United States Attorney General; Acting; 2017 | Succeeded by Channing D. Phillips; Acting |
