= James Clarkson (footballer) =

English soccer coach

Personal information
- Full name: James Andrew Clarkson
- Date of birth: 6 March 1972 (age 54)
- Place of birth: Wisbech, England

Senior career*
Years	Team	Apps	(Gls)
1995	Manawatu AFC		

Managerial career
- 2017–2018: Brazos Valley Cavalry
- 2019–2022: Houston Dash
- * Club domestic league appearances and goals

James Andrew Clarkson (born 6 March 1972) is an English-American football coach and former player who was most recently the head coach of Houston Dash in the National Women's Soccer League (NWSL).

== Career ==
He previously served as academy director for Houston Dynamo as well as head coach of Dynamo PDL affiliate Brazos Valley Cavalry FC. On 11 December 2018, Clarkson was announced as the head coach of the Houston Dash.

On 26 April 2022, Clarkson was suspended by the NWSL pending the completion of an investigation into abuse by multiple league personnel. On 9 January 2023, the NWSL announced that his return to the league was conditioned on the completion of anti-harassment training.

== Personal life ==
Clarkson lives in Houston with his wife, Lizz, and two sons, Jack and William. He obtained American citizenship on 3 May 2013.

== Managerial honours ==
- NWSL Challenge Cup
  - Winners: 2020
- NWSL Community Shield
  - Runners-up: 2020
