= Lisa Baird =

American businesswoman

Lisa Baird is an American businesswoman.

== Career ==
Baird has worked for IBM and the National Football League (NFL). She was described as "helped secure broadcast, sponsorship, and licensing deals during her decade with the United States Olympic and Paralympic Committee". In 2020, she was appointed commissioner of the National Women's Soccer League (NWSL). She resigned from that position on October 1, 2021 in the wake of the 2021 NWSL abuse scandal.
