= Richie Burke =

English football manager (born 1962)

Personal information
- Date of birth: 26 November 1962 (age 63)
- Place of birth: Liverpool, England

Youth career
- Liverpool
- Everton

Senior career*
Years	Team	Apps	(Gls)
- Washington Diplomats
- Washington Stars
- Sydney Olympic
- Chester City
1994	Washington Warthogs (indoor)	6	(0)

Managerial career
- 2011–2012: Northern Virginia Royals
- 2013: Livingston
- 2019–2021: Washington Spirit
- * Club domestic league appearances and goals

Richie Burke (born 26 November 1962) is an English former professional footballer and former manager of Washington Spirit competing in the National Women's Soccer League. He has extensive coaching experience in Scotland and the United States.

== Playing career ==
Burke started his career with Liverpool and Everton at youth level. After being released, he spent most of his professional playing career in the United States. Originally playing collegiate soccer at American University level, he then went on to play for the Washington Diplomats and the Washington Stars. He also enjoyed brief spells with Chester City in England and Sydney Olympic in Australia. Burke spent the later stages of his career playing indoor soccer with Washington Warthogs before retiring in 1994 following a career spanning 15 years.

== Coaching career ==
=== Coaching in the United States ===
Burke began his coaching career in the US soccer camp business as an owner and operator of The Players Soccer Academy. He then went on to work with the USSF in the Olympic Development Program. Burke was also employed as technical director and director of coaching at various regional powerhouse soccer clubs. He then enjoyed a successful stint at MLS club D.C. United where he worked in several positions including first-team assistant coach (from 2001 to 2003 under Ray Hudson), director of youth programs and USSF development academy head coach. In his time with the academy programme he helped to secure a MLS Youth Cup Championship in 2007. Burke's most recent coaching role in the US was with the Northern Virginia Royals as head coach. Burke had a history of accusations of abusive conduct during his time as a youth coach.

=== Livingston ===
In 2012, Burke moved back to the United Kingdom after securing a coaching position with Scottish Football League First Division side Livingston. In addition to this, he was also tasked with developing the clubs newly formed youth foundation. Burke, who was originally appointed as technical coach of the West Lothian club, was promoted to assistant manager (to Gareth Evans) following the departure of John Hughes to Hartlepool United in November 2012. After the dismissal of Gareth Evans as manager on 28 February 2013, Burke assumed the role of interim manager. On 25 March 2013, he was appointed as the new permanent manager of Livingston on a contract running until the summer of 2015. He left the club on 12 September, resigning for personal reasons after a slow start to the season.

=== Washington Spirit ===
In January 2019, Burke was appointed head coach of the Washington Spirit in the National Women's Soccer League taking over for interim manager, Tom Torres.

==== Misconduct allegations ====
In September 2021, Burke was fired following an investigation into allegations of harassment and abusive behavior towards players.

After multiple investigations into pervasive abuse within the league, Burke was one of four coaches banned from the NWSL for life on 9 January 2023.

== Managerial statistics ==
Team	Nat	From	To	Record				
Team	Nat	From	To	G	W	D	L	Win %
Northern Virginia Royals	(United States)	2011	2012	33	15	5	13	45.45
Livingston	(Scotland)	March 2013	September 2013	16	4	4	8	25.00
Washington Spirit	(United States)	January 2019	August 2021	24	9	7	8	37.50
