= National Women's Soccer League expansion =

Expansion of the National Women's Soccer League

Number of teams in the NWSL
Season	Teams
2013	8
2014	9
2015	9
2016	10
2017	10
2018	9
2019	9
2020	9
2021	10
2022	12
2023	12
2024	14
2025	14
2026	16

The expansion of the National Women's Soccer League began with the league's sophomore season in 2014, when the league expanded to a ninth team in Houston, and is an ongoing process that currently has seen five expansions, three direct or indirect relocations, and one contraction. The National Women's Soccer League (NWSL) was established as the top level of professional women's soccer in the United States in 2013 in the wake of the defunct Women's United Soccer Association (WUSA, 2001–2003) and Women's Professional Soccer (WPS, 2009–2011).

On May 10, 2023, league commissioner Jessica Berman announced the league's intent to expand further to 16 teams in 2026.

== Summary ==
As of May 2023, the NWSL consists of 12 teams with 12 separate ownership groups, with two teams approved for expansion in 2024. Of those 12 teams, seven are considered expansion teams either through net-new expansion (Houston Dash, Orlando Pride, Racing Louisville FC, Angel City FC, San Diego Wave FC) or the wholesale relocation of assets from a dissolved team (North Carolina Courage, from the Western New York Flash; Kansas City Current, from Utah Royals FC).

An eighth expansion team, Utah Royals FC, was formed in 2018 and dissolved in 2020. It is reconstituting as one of the two net-new expansion teams scheduled to begin play in 2024.

Locations of National Women's Soccer League teams.
Current club; future club.

== History ==
=== Membership timeline ===
Current team Defunct team Former team Future team

=== Formation and original eight teams ===
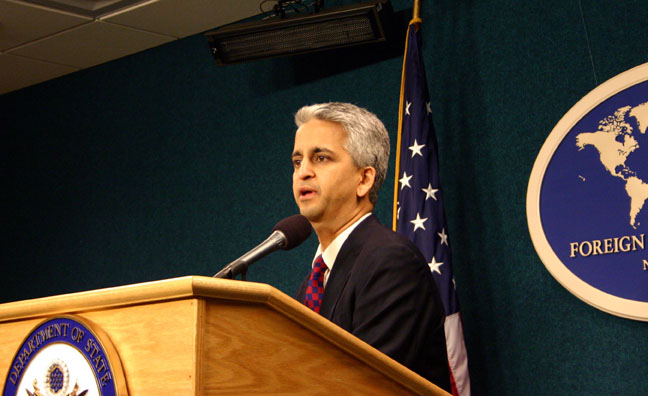
Sunil Gulati, president of the United States Soccer Federation in 2012, announced the NWSL's first eight teams in December.

The National Women's Soccer League (NWSL) was first announced on November 21, 2012, by United States Soccer Federation (USSF) president Sunil Gulati. At the time of the announcement, the only finalized details were the number and locations of the original teams; the league's name and logo had yet to be confirmed. Gulati revealed that the league would initially feature teams in the following areas: Boston, Chicago, Kansas City, Western New York, New Jersey, Portland, Seattle, and Washington, D.C.

Four of the original NWSL teams—Western New York Flash, Boston Breakers, Chicago Red Stars, and Sky Blue FC (New Jersey)—transitioned from the now-defunct Women's Professional Soccer (WPS) league. The remaining four teams were new franchises: Portland Thorns FC, Seattle Reign FC, Washington Spirit (originally founded as D.C. United Women of the USL W-League), and FC Kansas City.

=== Affiliation with men's clubs ===
Many NWSL ownership groups are affiliated with existing men's soccer teams, often from domestic leagues like Major League Soccer (MLS) or the United Soccer Leagues (USL). Currently, five NWSL ownership groups also operate men's teams:

- Houston Dash (MLS Houston Dynamo, since its founding as an expansion team in 2014)
- Orlando Pride (MLS Orlando City SC, since its founding as an expansion team in 2016)
- North Carolina Courage (USL North Carolina FC, since its founding as an expansion team via relocation of Western New York Flash in 2017)
- Racing Louisville FC (USL Louisville City FC, since its founding as an expansion team in 2019)
- Seattle Reign FC (MLS Seattle Sounders, since 2024)

Additionally, three NWSL clubs have been historically affiliated with a United States Men's Club including:

- FC Kansas City: Originally owned by the same group that operated the Missouri Comets (Major Arena Soccer League), the team was sold to independent ownership in January 2017. It folded later that year in November.
- Utah Royals FC: Established as a replacement for FC Kansas City, the Royals were owned by Dell Loy Hansen (owner of MLS club Real Salt Lake). In August 2020, a report by The Athletic detailing a history of alleged racist comments by Hansen prompted MLS and NWSL to open an investigation. On August 30th, 2020, Hansen entered into agreements to allow the respective leagues to facilitate the sales of the teams he owned. The Royals were replaced by an independent Kansas City expansion team, which acquired the Royals' assets.
- Portland Thorns FC: Affiliated with MLS team Portland Timbers from its founding in 2013 until 2023, when it was sold to a new independent ownership group.

Seattle Reign FC Evolution:

The team currently known as Seattle Reign FC was previously named OL Reign (2020–2023) under the ownership of OL Groupe, which also owned French Ligue 1 and Division 1 Féminine clubs under the Olympique Lyonnais brand.

== Early expansion: 2013–2016 ==
=== Initial expansion prospects ===
The eight teams selected for the NWSL's inaugural season in 2013 were chosen from a pool of twelve interested ownership groups. Shortly after the league's launch, plans to expand to ten teams for the 2014 season emerged, with potential candidates including groups that were not part of the original eight. Confirmed failed bids included groups from the Los Angeles area, Hartford, Connecticut, and the Seattle Sounders Women. By the end of the 2014 NWSL season, none of these four ownership groups remained in the league's expansion plans.

Speculation initially centered on the Vancouver Whitecaps Women as a logical expansion candidate, particularly with the 2015 FIFA Women's World Cup being held in Canada. However, the Whitecaps ended their women's program in December 2012, retaining only a U-18 academy team.

==== Connecticut Courage (2012–2014) ====
An ownership group in Hartford, Connecticut sought entry into Women's Professional Soccer (WPS) for the 2012 season and NWSL for the inaugural 2013 season. The team was to be named "Carolina Courage," managed by Terry Foley, a former general manager of the WPS's Philadelphia Independence, and play at Dillion Stadium. The ownership group behind the Connecticut bid was never publicly revealed and the Courage failed to join the league in 2013 and were again declined for expansion in 2014.

==== Los Angeles (LA/Pali Blues, 2013) ====
In Los Angeles, the first bid for an NWSL team came from a collaboration between the LA Strikers and Pali Blues, two of the most successful USL W-League teams. The Strikers had ties to MLS team Chivas USA, while the Pali Blues boasted two W-League titles and four playoff appearances in five seasons. Despite their strong track record and location in a major market, the bid was reportedly declined due to geographical concerns. The Pali Blues went on to win the 2013 W-League championship and, after merging with the LA Strikers, claimed the 2014 title as well. However, following Chivas USA's dissolution in 2014, the Pali Blues folded their W-League operations to focus on their men's USL Pro team.

==== FC Indiana (2013) ====
FC Indiana was one of the strongest teams in the Women's Premier Soccer League (WPSL) and had previously competed in WPSL Elite alongside eventual NWSL teams Boston Breakers, Chicago Red Stars, and Western New York Flash. While there was no official confirmation, the team's website hinted that they were among the 12 original bids to join the NWSL.

Shek Borkowski, the team's owner and then-head coach of the Haitian Women's National Team, later proposed that the Caribbean Football Union (CFU) could subsidize an NWSL team in a manner similar to the financial support provided by the United States Soccer Federation (USSF), Canada Soccer Association (CSA), and Mexican Football Federation (FMF).

In 2016, FC Indiana transitioned from the WPSL to United Women's Soccer for the league's sophomore season.

=== Houston Dash (2014) ===
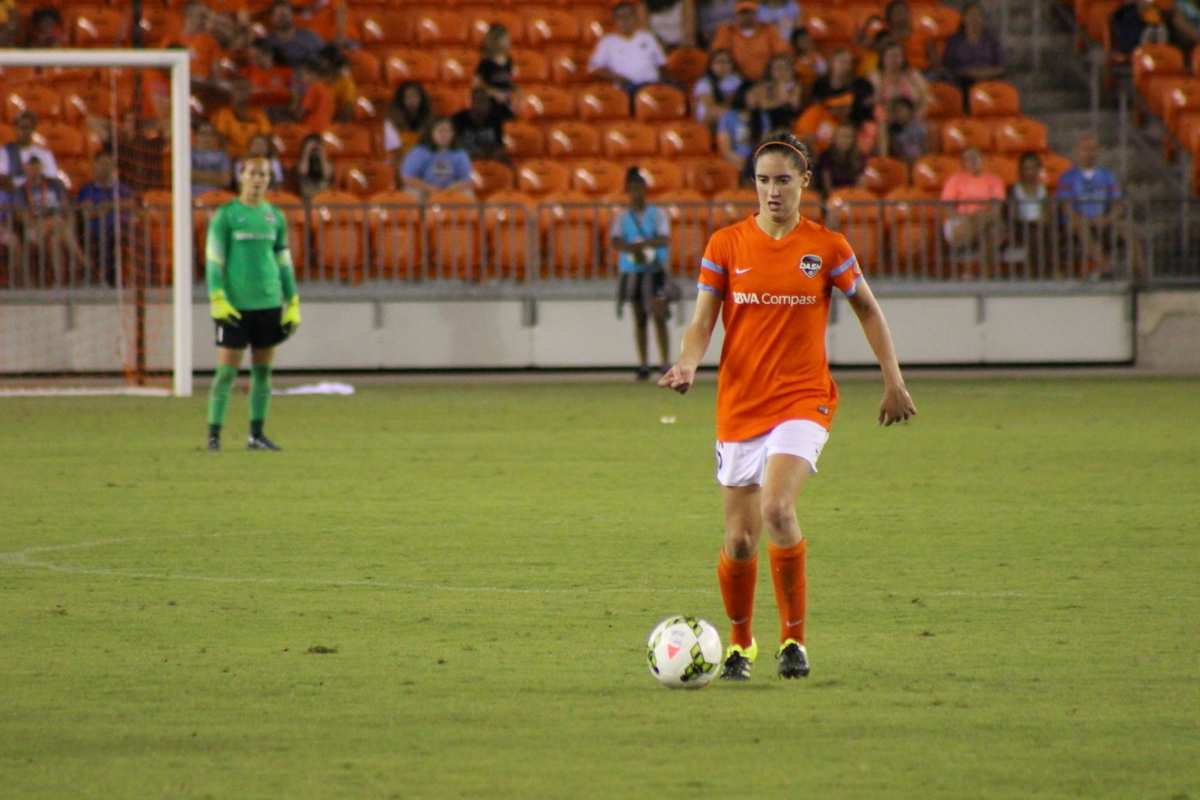
The Houston Dash became the first expansion team in the National Women's Soccer League (NWSL) and played its first season in 2014.

During the inaugural NWSL season, there was confirmed interest in joining the league from the WPSL side Houston Aces. However, during the 2013 NWSL playoffs in August, the league announced that there would be no expansion for the 2014 season.

Despite this, interest from Major League Soccer (MLS) teams in establishing women's sides continued to grow during the 2013-2014 offseason. Houston Dynamo FC expressed their interest in fielding a women's team, stating that they were "exploring the opportunity" to join the NWSL in either 2014 or 2015. By December 2013, the Dynamo announced the creation of the Houston Dash, which was subsequently approved by the NWSL for the 2014 season, despite the league's earlier statement about postponing expansion.

Following the 2015 FIFA Women's World Cup, then-NWSL commissioner Jeff Plush outlined plans to expand the league to 14 teams by 2020.

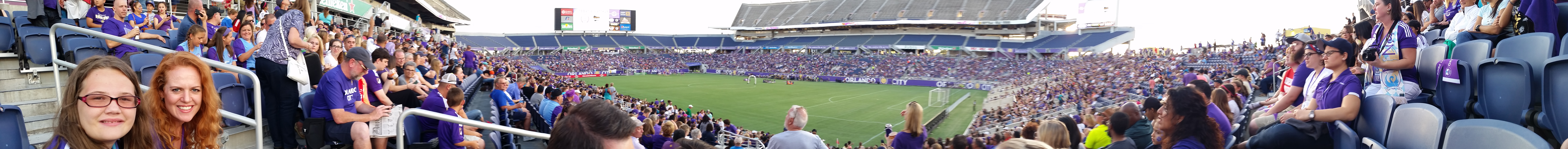
The expansion Orlando Pride team's home opener at Camping World Stadium in 2016 set a then-league attendance record of 23,403.

=== Orlando Pride (2016) ===
Following the 2015 FIFA Women's World Cup, Orlando City SC emerged as a potential NWSL expansion candidate. On October 20, 2015, the league announced the addition of its 10th team, the Orlando Pride, set to begin play in the 2016 season. The team hired former U.S. Women's National Team coach Tom Sermanni as its head coach.

Shortly after the announcement, the Pride completed a notable trade with Portland Thorns FC to acquire U.S. national team forward Alex Morgan and Canadian midfielder Kaylyn Kyle in exchange for rights to U.S. national team defender Meghan Klingenberg (via the Houston Dash and Seattle Reign FC), the first overall pick in the 2016 NWSL College Draft, an international roster spot for the 2016 and 2017 seasons, and the rights to U.S. national team midfielder Lindsey Horan. The trade's completion reportedly influenced the decision to launch the team in 2016 rather than in a later season.

== Growing pains: 2016–2018 ==
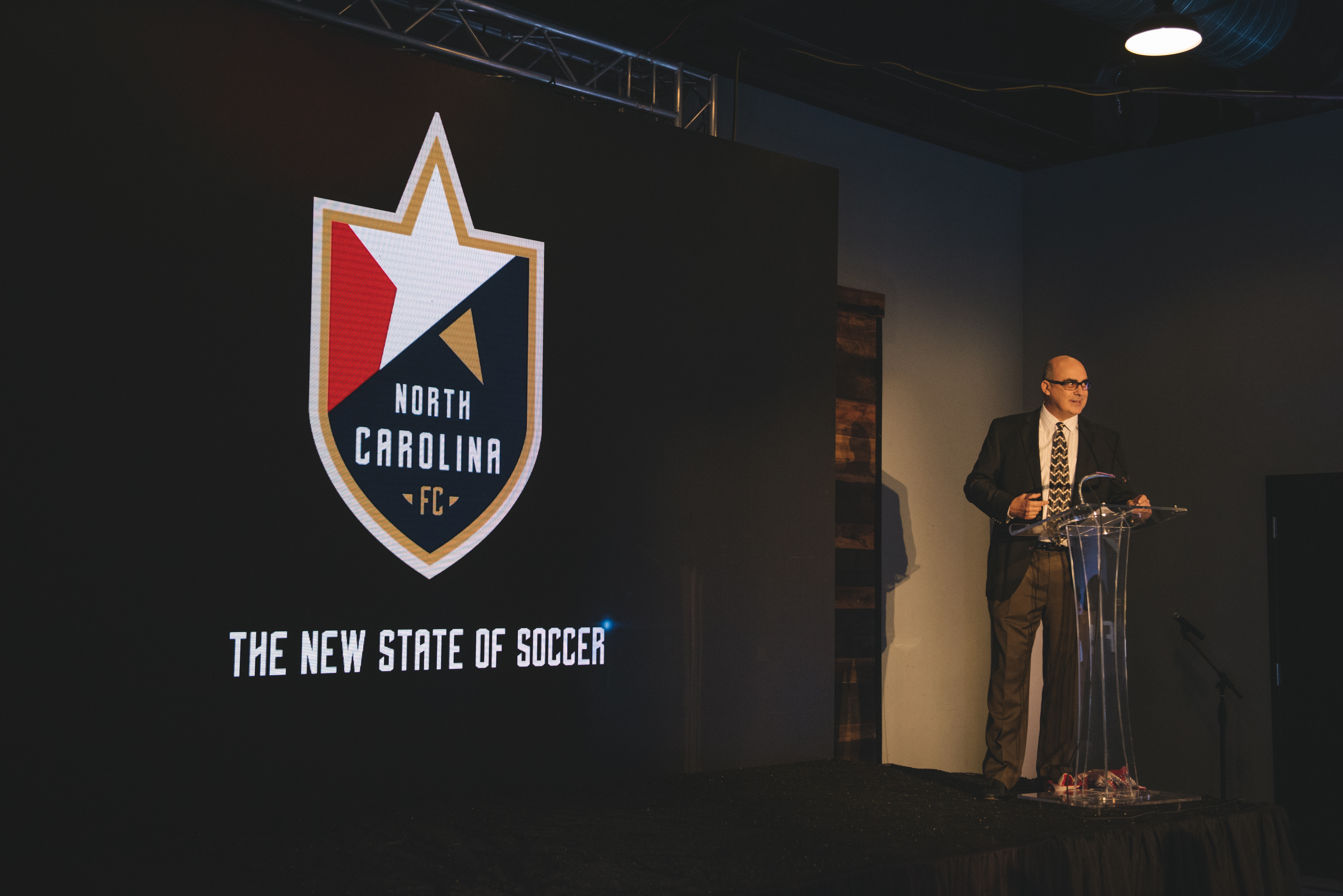
Steve Malik purchased the Western New York Flash and relocated its player assets to a new expansion team in Cary, North Carolina, the North Carolina Courage, in 2017.

=== Relocation of Western New York Flash to Cary, North Carolina (2017) ===
In May 2016, Steve Malik, owner of the North American Soccer League (NASL) club Carolina RailHawks (later rebranded as North Carolina FC), began discussions with the NWSL about establishing a team. By December 2016, North Carolina FC officially announced its intention to acquire an NWSL franchise. Rather than creating an expansion team, Malik's organization acquired the franchise rights to the 2016 NWSL champions, the Western New York Flash.

Despite their success in 2016, the Flash struggled with attendance in previous seasons and faced challenges filling Rochester Rhinos Stadium. Additionally, the organization had drawn negative attention in 2016 when hosting a match against Seattle Reign FC at Frontier Field, a baseball pitch repurposed as a non-compliant, narrow field, resulting in a league fine and public apologies from ownership.

On January 9, 2017, the sale and relocation of the team to Cary, North Carolina, were announced. The team was rebranded as the North Carolina Courage, adopting the name and lioness crest of the original Carolina Courage from the defunct Women's United Soccer Association (WUSA). The Sahlen family, who owned the Flash, conceded the Western New York market was not a suitable long-term fit for the NWSL.

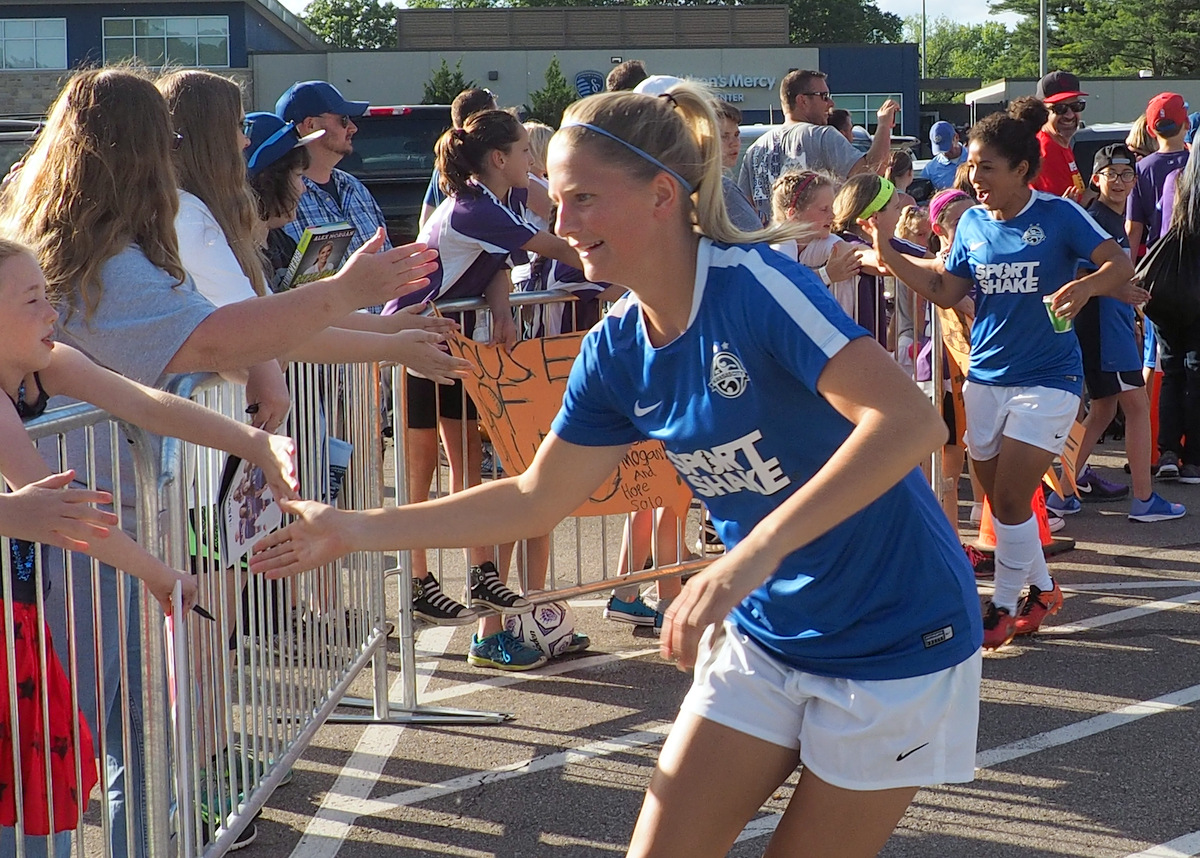
FC Kansas City won two championships before dissolving in 2017. Its player assets were transferred to a new expansion team, Utah Royals FC, in Salt Lake City.

=== Dissolution of FC Kansas City and Establishment of Utah Royals in Salt Lake City, Utah (2017) ===
In September 2014, Real Salt Lake (RSL) owner Dell Loy Hansen expressed interest in expanding the club to include a professional women's team and amateur men's team, alongside their existing major league and amateur women's teams. The club's pursuit of an NWSL franchise was officially confirmed in November, with plans to share a new stadium with the new USL Pro team, Real Monarchs. However, early stadium agreements fell through, and the team eventually chose a new location in West Valley City by early March 2015. In 2016, the Real Salt Lake Women joined United Women's Soccer as the move to NWSL appeared less imminent and the Monarchs began USL play in 2017 at Zion Bank Stadium.

Meanwhile, FC Kansas City, two-time NWSL champions, faced operational challenges during the 2016–2017 offseason, including a scandal, search for new management and absentee ownership. These issues led to discussions about selling the team again. In October 2017, after failed negotiations with other groups, Hansen reversed his stance and agreed to purchase an NWSL franchise. Later that week, FC Kansas City's owner, Elam Baer, sold the team back to the NWSL to fold, and Hansen acquired the franchise rights, with all player contracts transferred to Salt Lake City. The new Salt Lake NWSL team, which did not replace the existing RSL Women team, began play at Rio Tinto Stadium. On December 1, 2017, the team was named Utah Royals FC.

==== Pause in expansion (2017–2019) ====
In 2019, NWSL president Amanda Duffy emphasized that the league would prioritize the quality of potential teams rather than rushing expansion. She stated:

"We're really concentrating on the quality of the ownership, the quality of the market, the quality of existing facilities – both the match venue, training facilities — staff, infrastructure and the support in that market for soccer and women's soccer, in particular. So, the past year, we've been really trying to refine that process and refine what it is that we're looking for and what is the pace that we want to grow as a league? Because we're a strong league. We were strong at 10, we're strong at nine.

"If we all of sudden next year end up at 16 teams, how does that impact the quality of our competition and is that a pace that is sustainable and that we can still continue to operate with on a broader scale? Our efforts are very focused and specific to certain areas that we want to be strong for any team that's does come into the league that's going to help propel us at the top and help to elevate the league."

In December 2019, the league confirmed that it would remain at nine teams for the 2020 season and announced ongoing discussions with several ownership groups, with the potential for expansion as early as 2021.

==== Return to Kansas City (2021), potential return to Utah ====
In the aftermath of a player strike in August 2020, which postponed MLS matches as players declined to play in a show of support for the Black Lives Matter movement and in protest of the shooting of Jacob Blake, Utah Royals owner Dell Loy Hansen threatened to cease funding the club. This led to multiple allegations of racist behavior within the RSL organization, prompting investigations from both MLS and the NWSL. Hansen eventually sold Utah Soccer Holdings, which included the Royals.

With no clear resolution before MLS's January 8 deadline, NWSL closed Hansen's franchise rights for Utah and opted to add a new expansion team in Kansas City. The new ownership group consisted of Chris and Angie Long of Palmer Square Capital Management, along with former soccer player Brittany Matthews. Journalist Grant Wahl, a former classmate of Angie Long, helped connect the Longs with the NWSL.

All player rights, draft picks, and assets were transferred to the new Kansas City team, similar to how assets from FC Kansas City had been transferred to the Royals. NWSL and Utah Soccer Holdings also announced that the new owner of Utah Soccer Holdings could reintroduce the Royals branding as early as 2023.

=== Boston Breakers disbanded (2018) ===
The Boston Breakers, struggling with an unstable home stadium situation and average attendance of under 3,000 fans in most seasons, were initially considered for takeover by Real Salt Lake. However, before this could materialize, FC Kansas City disbanded, bringing in potential investors for Boston, though they were not ready in time for the 2018 season.

On January 28, 2018, the NWSL announced the Boston Breakers' folding, and players were subsequently dispersed to other teams through the 2018 dispersal draft on January 30.

== Growth phase: 2019–present ==
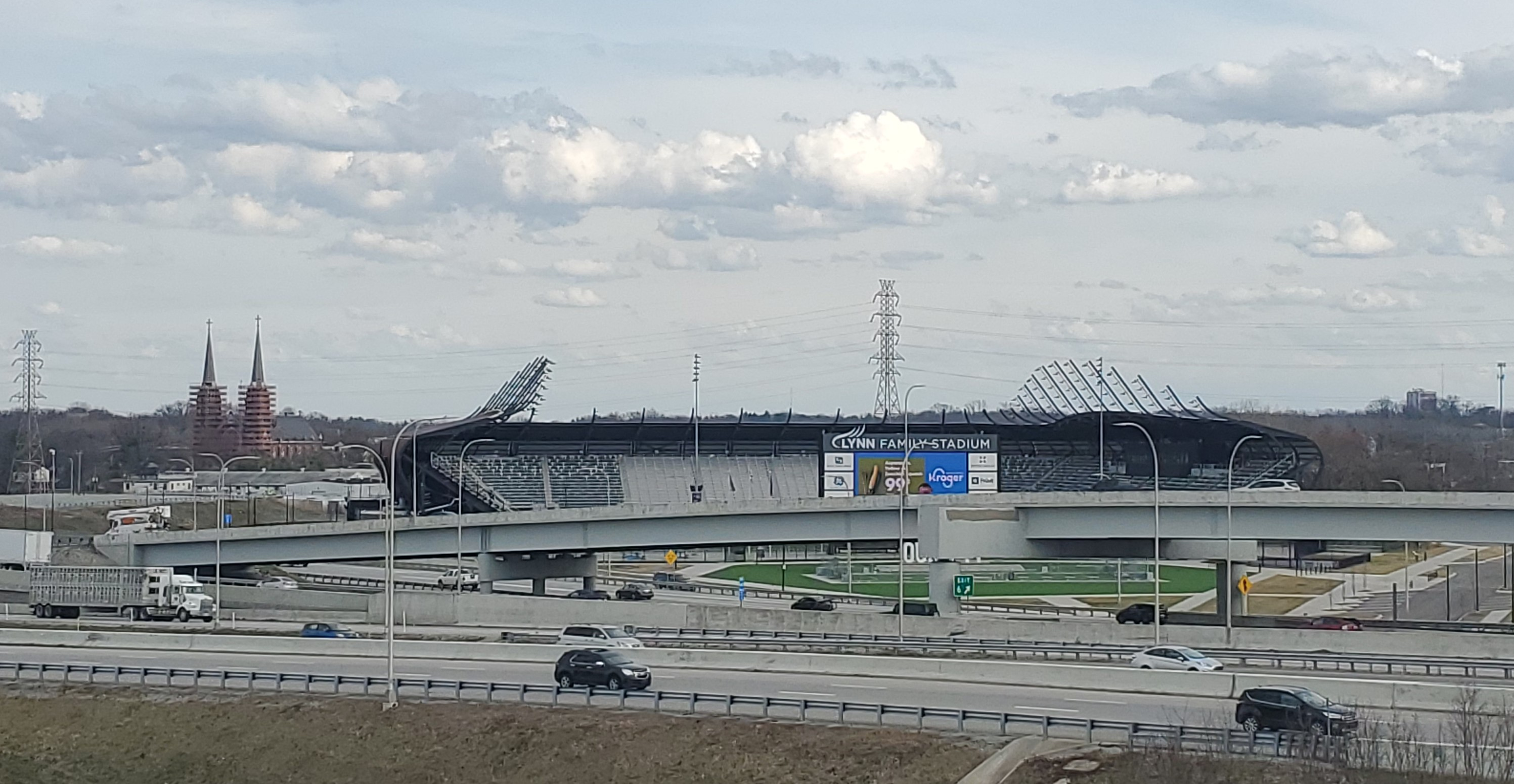
Lynn Family Stadium, completed for Louisville City FC in 2021, would also become the home venue of co-owned NWSL expansion team Racing Louisville FC.

=== Racing Louisville FC (2019–2021) ===
In March 2019, discussions about Lynn Family Stadium in Louisville, Kentucky, which was set to open in 2020 as the new home for USL Championship side Louisville City FC, included mentions of plans for an NWSL team by 2021 or 2022. This was significant due to the existing connection between NWSL's then-president Amanda Duffy and Louisville City, where Duffy had held several top-level positions. By August 2019, reports suggested Louisville was close to league approval for an NWSL team, initially planned for 2020. However, the timeline was shifted to 2021 due to concerns about Louisville City's transition to the new stadium, with Sacramento receiving the 2020 expansion spot instead.

The official announcement for the Louisville franchise came on October 22, 2019, followed by the unveiling of the team name "Proof Louisville FC" on November 12. This marked the first time an NWSL team had been announced more than five months before its debut. However, fan backlash against the "Proof Louisville" name and the rebrand of Louisville City FC led the ownership group to rebrand the team as Racing Louisville FC, with a redesigned crest.

=== Angel City FC (2022) ===
Following the folding of Chivas USA, the MLS awarded a new team to the Los Angeles area in 2014, with an ownership group that included USWNT legend Mia Hamm, her husband Nomar Garciaparra, and Lakers legend and Sparks co-owner Magic Johnson. Although some criticism arose regarding Hamm's investment in men's soccer before women's soccer, it fueled speculation that the new MLS side would also invest in an NWSL team. Hamm later confirmed that it "just makes sense."

In 2019, Hamm commented that LAFC, the MLS team linked to the ownership group, was focused on establishing itself first before considering an NWSL team. However, in the summer of 2020, news emerged of new NWSL expansion talks, with some MLS involvement. While LAFC denied their involvement, reports suggested that the Los Angeles Galaxy, which already had a team in the WPSL, was the likely partner. On July 21, 2020, the NWSL confirmed that it had awarded expansion rights to a new group of investors to bring a team to Los Angeles for the 2022 season. The team, later named Angel City FC, was backed by an investment group that included Hamm and Garciaparra, along with several celebrities like Natalie Portman, Jennifer Garner, Eva Longoria, Alexis Ohanian, Serena Williams, Glennon Doyle, and Casey Neistat. The ownership also included former USWNT stars such as Julie Foudy, Hamm, and Abby Wambach.

While no formal team name was initially announced, the investment group was referred to as "Angel City," and they registered the trademark for "Angel City FC" in anticipation of their 2022 launch.

=== San Diego Wave FC (2022) ===
The San Diego expansion bid initially began as a joint venture between USL side Sacramento Republic FC, investor Ronald Burkle, and WPSL team California Storm. However, complications within the bid led to a shift in focus, with the expansion effort moving to San Diego.

Sacramento Republic FC had expressed interest in adding an NWSL team as early as 2015 and 2016, with ownership group member Kevin Nagle confirming the desire to pursue a women's team in November 2016. In 2019, reports indicated that Sacramento was in advanced talks to join the NWSL in 2020, with involvement from the California Storm WPSL team, which had recently added USWNT legends Brandi Chastain, Leslie Osborne, and Brazilian international Sissi to their board. However, the deal fell through due to issues surrounding the league's conflict with USSF and unspecified challenges with the Sacramento group. Despite this, Sacramento remained a potential market for expansion as of July 2020.

On January 12, 2021, NWSL commissioner Lisa Baird shared in a press conference that a team in Sacramento would join the league in 2022, but the official announcement never came. It was later revealed that Burkle withdrew from the Sacramento MLS bid. The Sacramento NWSL bid team, which had already paid expansion fees, requested to move its expansion rights to San Diego. On June 8, 2021, the NWSL confirmed that San Diego had been awarded an expansion team, led by Burkle and team president Jill Ellis. The team, named San Diego Wave FC, officially joined the league for the 2022 season.

=== Return of Utah Royals (2024) ===
Following the sale and relocation of Utah Royals FC to Kansas City in December 2020, NWSL and Utah Soccer Holdings announced that the new buyer for Utah Soccer Holdings would have the option to reintroduce the Royals branding to NWSL as early as 2023. On January 5, 2022, Real Salt Lake was sold to a group led by David Blitzer, co-owner of the Philadelphia 76ers and Crystal Palace F.C., and Ryan Smith, owner of the Utah Jazz. Blitzer indicated that reestablishing the Utah Royals in NWSL was a matter of "when, not if," in a statement to the Salt Lake Tribune. The Royals social media accounts reposted his quote as their first activity since the team's relocation.

In May 2022, it was reported that Real Salt Lake's ownership group was among those expressing strong interest in bringing an NWSL expansion team to Utah. On June 30, 2022, NWSL commissioner Jessica Berman confirmed that new teams would be joining the league in 2024 at the earliest, and discussions were ongoing to renegotiate the reactivation fee for the Utah franchise. ESPN later reported that Utah Royals FC was expected to return as one of two expansion teams in 2024.

By January 2023, it was confirmed that the NWSL would expand to Utah, San Francisco, and Boston, with the Utah group expected to pay between $2–5 million for their expansion rights. Utah Royals FC, alongside San Francisco, began play in 2024, while Boston will join in 2026.

=== Bay FC (San Jose/San Francisco Bay Area, 2024) ===
Conflicting reports in 2014 and 2015 linked MLS's San Jose Earthquakes to a potential NWSL team. However, Earthquakes president Dave Kaval stated in May 2016 that the Earthquakes were interested in bringing an NWSL side to San Jose but were waiting for the approval and completion of a training and academy complex in order to be capable of hosting a NWSL or USL side. Kaval reiterated his previous comments on the NWSL in November, and added with regard to the training facility that "We're in Week 20 in a 60-week process. Next summer they could certify the EIR (environmental impact report)."

In January 2021, reports emerged of a new ownership group (unnamed former United States women's national soccer team players, separate from the Earthquakes) being interested in bringing NWSL to San Jose, with plans to play at the PayPal Park. On May 13, 2022, an SF Bay Area bid was among the seven groups Grant Wahl reported had strong interest in starting NWSL expansion teams. On June 21, 2022, former United States women's national soccer team players Brandi Chastain, Leslie Osborne, Danielle Slaton, and Aly Wagner officially announced this bid to join NWSL branded as "NWSL to the Bay." On January 27, 2023, it was reported that the NWSL would expand to Utah, San Francisco and Boston. The owners in Utah would pay $2–5 million, while the groups in San Francisco and Boston would pay $50 million. Utah and San Francisco would join the NWSL in 2024 and Boston would join the NWSL later, likely in 2026.

The expansion was formally announced on April 4, 2023, with the expansion fee for both the Bay Area bid and a future Boston bid reportedly set at $53 million. Investment group Sixth Street Partners led the bid as the team's majority and controlling owners, with Sixth Street CEO Alan Waxman, former Golden State Warriors president Rick Welts, former San Francisco Giants executive Staci Slaughter, and former Facebook chief operating officer Sheryl Sandberg among the club's announced board members. Waxman would also represent the club on the league's board of governors. The team's name, Bay FC, and logo were announced on June 1, 2023.

=== Boston Legacy FC (2026) ===
Among the 2022 expansion bids was a group proposing a new NWSL team in Boston, led by Juno Equity founder Jennifer Epstein as controlling manager. While the bid was not accepted for expansion in 2024, reports by Sportico and The Wall Street Journal suggested the bid was still considered for future expansion. The bid included Boston Globe publisher Linda Henry, co-owner of English Premier League club Liverpool F.C. with her husband John W. Henry.

In December 2022, the Mayor of Boston, Michelle Wu, suggested White Stadium in Franklin Park, Boston, as a possible venue for the team and voiced her support for the bid. The east concourse had been destroyed in a fire, and the west grandstand was not up to modern building code. In April 2023, Wu announced a request for proposals to update the stadium's west grandstand and lease the venue for ten years. The selected tenant would be responsible for maintaining the stadium, which would be owned by the city and operated by Boston Public Schools. In May 2023, residents voiced concerns about the potential parking and traffic impact of more frequent events, and park users feared renovations or loss of access that would detract from the surrounding Franklin Park.

On June 26, 2023, Epstein's Boston Unity Soccer Partners LLC submitted a $30 million renovation proposal for the stadium, announced on July 8 as the only proposal submitted to the city's request. The proposal included expanding the stadium's capacity from 10,000 to 11,000, and creating a public plaza in an adjacent portion of Franklin Park. The City of Boston and Boston Unity Soccer Partners would each cover half of the cost under the proposal, with $10.5 million already allocated in the city's capital plan, and the proposal suggested the stadium would be renovated in time for the 2026 NWSL season. Under the proposal, the stadium would not be available to an NWSL team as a full-time practice facility, retractable seating would be added to cover the running track for soccer matches, and the renovated stadium would rely on temporary mobile restrooms on matchdays.

On September 19, 2023, the Boston NWSL expansion team was announced, with a planned start date in 2026.

=== Denver Summit FC (2026) ===
In July 2023, an investment group named For Denver For Colorado (For Denver FC) and including former player Jordan Angeli, Major League Cricket marketing executive Tom Dunmore, and Ben Hubbard, CEO of supply-chain insurance firm Parsyl, launched a public campaign to bid for either an NWSL or USL Super League team in the Denver, Colorado market. The initial announcement did not identify any further investors or venues, and presented goals of attracting further investment by the end of 2023 to secure a bid and beginning play in 2026. IMA Financial Group CEO Robert Cohen and Phos CEO Nicole Glaros later also joined as investors.

Sportico reported in January 2025 that Denver had won the bid for an expansion fee of US$110 million, the largest expansion fee in American women's sports history. The club plans to build its own soccer-specific stadium and use a temporary ground before then.

=== Atlanta City FC (2028) ===
An investment group out of Atlanta went public in early January 2015 with its intent to bring an NWSL team to the city that has already seen two incarnations of professional women's soccer in WUSA and WPS - with a website already live and a stadium already decided. While there was initial fan interest, many objected to the initially proposed name of the Atlanta Vibe, prompting the investment group to open a poll for the name, as was a survey for team colors. The group eventually chose red and black for the team's identity, while the stadium was changed from Henderson Field at Grady Stadium to Silverbacks Park, but there had been no sign of any talk between the group and NWSL at that point, despite the fact that the group has been working toward NWSL expansion for over 18 months. After the early-summer NWSL owners' meeting, it appeared that Atlanta was rejected for 2016 and would have to continue trying for future expansion.

In December 2016, rumors surfaced of another group reportedly trying to bring both NASL and NWSL teams to Atlanta. The proposed team would play at a to-be-constructed facility in DeKalb County. The group revealed itself in February 2017 as First Team SC and announced their proposal to play in the just-announced Atlanta Sports City complex in DeKalb County. This included a scheduled announcement for April 2017, but First Team SC delayed that announcement indefinitely, citing "the landscape of American soccer changing dramatically." Fans reported receiving surveys via e-mail concerning the ongoing efforts in December 2017 with the aim of a 2019 launch.

As reported in 2019, Atlanta United were considering launching a professional women's team to compete in the NWSL. Reports expected the team to do so by 2021. However, no bid was publicly announced or awarded. On May 13, 2022, Atlanta United FC's ownership was among the seven groups Grant Wahl reported had strong interest in starting NWSL expansion teams.

In November 2025, it was reported that Arthur Blank, owner of Atlanta United, had gotten an expansion franchise that would become Atlanta City FC that would play at Mercedes-Benz Stadium, which was later confirmed and would begin play in 2028.

=== Columbus, Ohio (2028) ===
On April 21, 2026, it was announced that the 18th club would be in Columbus, Ohio. The Haslam Sports Group that owns the Columbus Crew, agreed to pay around a $300 million expansion fee and infrastructure and an additional $50 million in governmental support. The team is expected to take the field in 2028.

== Future expansion prospects ==
On May 13, 2022, sports journalist Grant Wahl reported that seven groups had strong interest in starting NWSL expansion teams: MLS ownership groups of Atlanta United FC, Austin FC, FC Cincinnati, Real Salt Lake, and Toronto FC, as well as non-MLS ownership groups in MLS markets of Columbus and the San Francisco Bay Area (San Jose specifically). At the beginning of 2022 Jeff Blitzer, the new lead owner of Real Salt Lake, had mentioned the club's intention of reestablishing Utah Royals FC in NWSL. The San Francisco Bay Area group formally announced their bid on June 21, 2022. On June 30, 2022, NWSL commissioner Jessica Berman commented that any new teams would enter the league in 2024 at the earliest. ESPN reported the same day that Utah Royals FC were expected to be one of two expansion teams to join NWSL for the 2024 season. This same report confirmed the interest of the seven groups Wahl had previously listed as well as added that MLS clubs Nashville SC and St. Louis City SC had interest in establishing NWSL clubs.

In Berman's June 30, 2022, announcement, she noted the league had fielded interest from more than 30 investment groups. In May 2023, the Boston Globe reported that 62 bids had engaged in due diligence with the league after Berman's announcement. In May 2023, Berman announced plans to expand by two additional teams in 2026.

In October 2024, it was reported that in addition of an expansion team in Boston for the 2026 season that Cincinnati, Cleveland, Denver, Nashville, and Philadelphia were the final cities being considered for expansion. And in November 2024, Berman confirmed that Cincinnati, Cleveland, and Denver were the three finalists for the NWSL's sixteenth team.

=== Cincinnati bid ===
MLS expansion club FC Cincinnati expressed interest in gaining a NWSL club once their new West End Stadium, ultimately named TQL Stadium, opened in 2021. USWNT and NWSL star, Rose Lavelle, a Cincinnati native, has spoken several times about her desire to play professional soccer in Cincinnati. On May 13, 2022, FC Cincinnati's ownership was among the seven groups with strong interest in starting NWSL expansion teams. FC Cincinnati confirmed on June 11, 2024, that it had submitted a bid to the NWSL. In November 2024, Indiana Fever and women's basketball superstar Caitlin Clark joined the bidding ownership group.

=== Cleveland bid ===
In July 2023, ownership group Cleveland Pro Soccer announced its intent to bid for the 16th NWSL expansion team, which would begin playing in 2026.

Owned by Michael Murphy and Nolan Gallagher (formerly Gravitas Ventures), Cleveland Pro Soccer announced in November 2022 it would launch an MLS NEXT Pro men's professional soccer team in Cleveland. Sportico reported in December 2022 that Cleveland had also bid for the NWSL's 15th expansion team, but was not selected. Cleveland was one of the final four bids in 2022; the 15th expansion team went to NWSL Boston.

In October 2023, Cleveland Pro Soccer launched a public campaign to bid for an NWSL team in Northeast Ohio. The campaign is intended to demonstrate the strength of the Cleveland sports market and has received strong local support.

A stadium announcement for Cleveland professional soccer teams, including location and seating capacity, is expected in 2024. In May 2024, Cleveland Soccer Group released the location and initial renderings of the soccer-specific stadium. In September 2024, Cleveland Soccer Group announced a partnership with Cleveland Metroparks and that they had completed a $4.2 million deal to purchase 14 acres of land for a future NWSL soccer stadium. The proposed $150 million stadium would be built if the NWSL approves the bid. The stadium itself is planned for 12,500 fans, with the possibility of expanding to 20,000.

=== Minnesota Aurora FC bid ===
As per the Community Owner Town Hall, which occurred February 27, 2024, Minnesota Aurora FC intends on once again submitting a bid to become the 16th NWSL club in 2026. During the Town Hall meeting, front office officials acknowledged their intention on submitting another bid and confirmed that while more potential investment has been secured, the search for a principal owner remains ongoing.

After beginning play as a community owned team in 2022, the USL W League club has enjoyed wild success in its home market. The team has averaged +5600 fans per game in their two seasons and have gone undefeated in regular season play (23-0-1, 26-2-1 overall). The team has also secured a local broadcasting deal that has been very successful. Aurora's lowest attended season, 5600 in 2022, surpasses 67% of all historical NWSL team attendance averages, and surpassed two NWSL clubs in the most recent season of 2023.

Minnesota Aurora FC submitted a 2024 NWSL expansion bid in 2022 while searching for a principal owner that met the USSF Division 1 ownership guidelines. The bid was put on hiatus in December 2022 as the timeline proved to be too short of a runway for the team to secure the necessary investment to join the league.

=== St. Louis interest ===
In an interview in September 2023, Carolyn Kindle, chief executive officer of MLS side St. Louis City SC, stated that she and the other owners of the club were interested in bringing a NWSL franchise to St. Louis. Kindle indicated that because of the robust youth soccer system in the area, and because demand for MLS tickets has outpaced supply, she believes a women's club in St. Louis would be well supported. St. Louis City SC is the first female majority-owned team in MLS. The ownership group has not made any public announcements regarding a formal bid for a NWSL franchise, with the league accepting bids in 2024 for their 16th club to begin play in 2026.

St. Louis last hosted professional women's soccer in 2010 when Saint Louis Athletica of Women's Professional Soccer folded. The St. Louis area is home to two successful NCAA Division I women's soccer programs at Saint Louis University and SIU Edwardsville. The St. Louis Craig League, which took place in the early 1950s, is recognized as the first organized women's soccer league in the United States.

== Historical bids (not currently active) ==
=== 2015–2019 ===
In early 2015, six groups had expressed interest in gaining entry into NWSL, four of which were known - Real Salt Lake, the Indy Eleven, the Pittsburgh Riverhounds, and an independent group from Atlanta. The other two groups were rumored to be western MLS clubs. NWSL commissioner Jeff Plush stated that any potential expansion for 2016 would have to be announced soon after the April owners' meeting; the Atlanta group was the only publicly announced group interested in 2016 expansion, and when no announcement came from NWSL by May, it seemed 2016 expansion was dead. However, the success of the United States women's national soccer team in the 2015 FIFA Women's World Cup renewed expansion talks, with the number of interested groups ballooning to twelve - more than the current size of the league. The first result of this post-WWC boom was Orlando's expansion into the league for the 2016 season.

Several months after the NWSL announced the Orlando Pride's addition to the league, commissioner Jeff Plush suggested that the league was in varying stages of talks with a dozen different potential expansion groups, many of whom were from MLS organizations. MLS commissioner Don Garber stated in April 2016 that half of MLS teams could be running NWSL teams in the near future.

==== FC Barcelona (2016–19) ====
Current status
No publicly announced NWSL bid as of May 12, 2023; Los Angeles expansion team founded independently as Angel City FC.

In July 2016, FC Barcelona president Josep Maria Bartomeu stated in an interview on Barça TV that he wanted to "create a team that can take part in the National Women's Soccer League". The Spanish club was reportedly interested in establishing a NWSL side in New York, Los Angeles, or the San Francisco Bay area. Barcelona's board approved plans to pursue an NWSL expansion team in May 2017, with a goal of launching the team as early as 2018 but no further details released to the public. The expansion effort was ultimately pushed back to a 2019 launch date, with Barça zeroing in on Santa Monica, California as a potential location.

Soon after, it was reported that FCB and LAFC were in talks to work together at bringing NWSL to Los Angeles. After years of talks, though, the prospect of a joint expansion effort fell through, with sources from NWSL stating that FCB's desire to keep their branding was a major reason for any expansion effort including FCB to be unlikely. Concerns about requests for changing NWSL's international player rules were also said to be a sticking point.

==== Canada (2016) ====
Current status
Multiple MLS teams publicly stated that they had no intention to start an NWSL team in 2016. Domestic league launched in 2025, see Northern Super League

On April 16, 2013, just after the NWSL's inaugural season began, The Equalizer interviewed NWSL commissioner Cheryl Bailey about numerous topics, including expansion. She responded to a question focused on Toronto and Vancouver by noting that there was considerable interest in longer-term expansion, but also interest in getting in early, ostensibly for the 2014 season, and said that the NWSL would start looking at expansion potential in Canada toward the later portion of the 2013 season.

In July 2014, Peter Montopoli, general secretary of the Canadian Soccer Association, suggested that the upcoming 2015 Women's World Cup offered an opportunity for the NWSL to expand to Canadian cities, with speculation that the expansion could even occur in time for the 2015 NWSL season. However, in late August 2014, Bailey said there would be no expansion for 2015, citing the logistical challenges of scheduling the league around the Women's World Cup that might put off expansion until at least 2016.

With high fan interest in Canada during and following the World Cup, the Whitecaps reiterated that there was "nothing imminent" in terms of the Whitecaps organization joining NWSL, making it highly unlikely that they were one of the then-dozen groups in discussion with the league concerning expansion. At an end-of-season meeting with three Whitecaps supporters groups in 2016, the Whitecaps inquired about the prospect of a Vancouver NWSL team. Meanwhile, officials and spokespersons for Toronto FC and the Montreal Impact reiterated that their clubs had no intention of joining the NWSL.

==== Dallas (2016) ====
Current status
No publicly announced NWSL bid as of May 12, 2023; Dallas team announced in May 2023 as a founding club of the proposed competing top-division USL Super League.

FC Dallas reinstated its WPSL team FC Dallas Women for the 2016 WPSL season, after having only fielded an ECNL side following a previous two-year stint in WPSL. While the team's coach Ben Waldrum suggested that an NWSL franchise should be a goal, he noted in June 2016 that there had been no directive from Hunt Sports Group to pursue one.

SouthStar FC played in the Women's Premier Soccer League (WPSL) in its inaugural season in 2019. The 2020 season was cancelled due to the COVID-19 pandemic. They planned to play in the 2021 WPSL season. Their primary focus is growing women's soccer in the Dallas/Ft. Worth market, and they feel the NWSL would be successful here.

==== Indianapolis (Indy Eleven, 2015–2019) ====
Current status
No publicly announced NWSL bid as of May 12, 2023; Indy Eleven-operated team announced in May 2023 as a founding club of the proposed competing top-division USL Super League.

Indy Eleven, which moved from the NASL to the USL after the 2017 season and was previously led by ex-Chicago-Red-Stars GM Peter Wilt, expressed interest in an NWSL side in 2015, contingent on them getting a new soccer-specific stadium built for the Eleven with a target date in 2017. The Eleven's inability to secure the stadium plan delayed Indianapolis NWSL expansion until 2018 at the earliest. In 2019, the Indiana General Assembly passed a stadium bill for the Eleven, for the newly proposed Eleven Park. The developers have expressed interest in a potential Women's soccer team to play at the stadium.

==== Miami ====
Current status
No publicly announced NWSL bid as of May 12, 2023.

Inter Miami CF owner David Beckham has voiced interest in adding an NWSL Miami side to his MLS club, but no plans have been openly discussed.

==== Minnesota (2017) ====
Current status
No publicly announced NWSL bid as of May 12, 2023.

Before NWSL bought FC Kansas City back from Minnesota-based Elam Baer, a second Minnesota-based group was in discussion for purchasing the team, though discussion about relocation was unsure. After the sale and disbanding of the team, Baer stated that he was interested in eventually rejoining NWSL ownership to bring a team directly to Minnesota as he believed the league to be "a good long-term investment".

==== New York City FC (2016) ====
Current status
Sky Blue FC rejected partnerships with New York City FC.

City Football Group has expressed interest in starting a team in NWSL to mirror their MLS side New York City FC after having created very successful sister teams to Manchester City and Melbourne City. During the time when it was known as Sky Blue FC, current NWSL side NJ/NY Gotham FC had been in talks with both NYCFC and the New York Red Bulls for a partnership, but nothing came of the 2014 talks with NYCFC and Sky Blue rejected the 2013 proposed deal from NYRB.

==== Pittsburgh (2018) ====
Current status
No publicly announced NWSL bid as of May 18, 2023.

Under new ownership in 2014 after having recently gone through bankruptcy, USL Pro side Pittsburgh Riverhounds also expressed interest in NWSL as an expansion on top of the youth structure already in place. As of 2015, the Riverhounds planned to expand their stadium capacity by 50%, and their target for an NWSL team was 2018. In 2025, the Riverhounds added an USL W team, which would go on to win their division in the first year of existence.

==== Other USL markets ====
Current status
Phoenix among markets announced in May 2023 as a founding club of the proposed competing top-division USL Super League.

In August 2018, Research Triangle TV station WRAL reported on remarks made by North Carolina Courage owner Steve Malik, also owner of the USL's North Carolina FC, to WRAL's sister radio station. He had been asked about rumors that the NWSL and USL were exploring a partnership, and chose to reframe the question to the issue of league expansion:

I just came from the USL meetings. Are there USL clubs that NWSL is talking to? Absolutely. There are some great fits where, if you build a 10,000- to 12,000-seat stadium in an urban area in a top 40 or top 50 market, particularly one that may not have Major League Soccer. If you own that stadium, do you want some dates? Yeah, you want some dates.

The WRAL-TV report speculated that at least five USL markets were potentially viable as NWSL expansion targets for 2020 and beyond. In addition to Louisville, whose NWSL side ultimately debuted in 2021, Hartford, Phoenix, Sacramento, and San Antonio were identified as possible targets. Amanda Duffy, then NWSL director of operations, had connections to the management of San Antonio FC, having previously worked under that club's managing director Tim Holt when he was the president of the USL parent organization. However, after the 2019 FIFA Women's World Cup, USL announced its intention to form its own women's league, which on September 21, 2021, was announced as the second-division USL Super League.

=== 2019–2022 ===
In August 2019, Merritt Paulson, principal owner of Portland Thorns FC in the NWSL and the Portland Timbers in MLS and also a major player in the NWSL's expansion committee, held an open forum with supporters in which he stated there were two new teams committed to the NWSL for 2020, and a third aiming for a 2021 launch. He added that the teams in line for 2020 were in the Southeast and West Coast, and that the potential 2021 entry would be a "really significant, big-name addition" to the NWSL. Paulson then went further, saying "One of them's an MLS team, one of them will be an MLS team, one of them's a USL team. That's probably more than I should have said." An unnamed source told the women's soccer news outlet The Equalizer that the three markets Paulson was alluding to were, in order of mention, Atlanta (MLS side Atlanta United FC), Sacramento (USL Championship side Sacramento Republic FC), and Louisville (USL Championship side Louisville City FC). Louisville was the first of these markets to be officially announced as a new NWSL entry. Sacramento's bid was mentioned on January 12, 2021, by then NWSL commissioner Lisa Baird as joining the league in 2021, though the expansion bid was moved to San Diego and officially announced on June 8 that same year.

In late 2019, the league announced plans to expand from nine teams to fourteen over the next three years. However, a combination of disagreements between NWSL and USSF on how the league should be run (especially concerning a commissioner) and the later COVID-19 pandemic, this schedule was pushed back with no expansion in 2020. However, multiple league officials voiced optimism about reaching 14 teams in their near future.

==== New England (Connecticut, 2019) ====
Current status
As of May 12, 2023, the NWSL has made no public announcements about the bid.

In April 2019, former Connecticut congressional candidate and real-estate investor Mark Greenberg submitted a bid for an NWSL team, with an ownership group that included former USWNT player Kristine Lilly and plans to play at 7,000-seat stadium to be built at a softball complex in Windsor, Connecticut, and the Willow Brook Park baseball facility in New Britain, Connecticut. Mohegan Sun Sports, operator of the Connecticut Sun of the Women's National Basketball Association and New England Black Wolves of the National Lacrosse League, would operate the team's business. The group also included longtime soccer administrator Thom Meredith and Civic Mind Studios founder T.J. Clynch. Dillon Stadium, the proposed site for the 2012 bid, was now occupied by men's team Hartford Athletic, which was not involved in the 2019 bid. The proposed team would be branded for New England rather than Connecticut.

==== Austin, Texas (2018–2022) ====
Current status
No publicly announced NWSL bid as of May 12, 2023; Austin FC refused to confirm interest in a bid in October 2022.

Austin, Texas, has been listed as a potential NWSL expansion candidate multiple times since summer of 2018, though few details are known concerning the potential ownership group. On May 13, 2022, Austin FC's ownership was among the seven groups Grant Wahl reported had strong interest in starting NWSL expansion teams. However, in October 2022 a spokesperson for Austin FC refused to comment on whether the team was considering financially supporting a women's team.

==== Canada (Toronto FC, 2021–2022) ====
Current status
No publicly announced bid as of May 12, 2023; an independent Canadian women's professional soccer league known as the Northern Super League was announced in 2022 with AFC Toronto City among its founding teams.

Following Canada's gold medal victory in the 2020 Summer Olympics in Tokyo, renewed calls were made for a Canadian-based team in the NWSL. With Canada Soccer President Nick Bontis wanting to bring a NWSL team to Canada or for a dedicated Canadian professional league.

On May 13, 2022, Toronto FC's ownership was among the seven groups Grant Wahl reported had strong interest in starting NWSL expansion teams.

==== Oakland, California (2022) ====
Current status
No publicly announced NWSL bid as of May 18, 2023. NWSL approved a Bay Area team for play in the same media market to launch in 2024. Oakland Roots/Soul were announced in May 2023 as a potential founding club of the proposed competing top-division USL Super League.

A bid based out of Oakland, California, was announced on November 2, 2022, as part of a strategic alliance between The Town FC and the African American Sports & Entertainment Group. The AASEG is also attempting to bring WNBA and NFL expansions to Oakland, with the goal of these three teams to be based at the current site of the Oakland Arena and Oakland Coliseum.

==== Philadelphia (2022) ====
Current status
Has not submitted a bid for expansion as of May 9, 2023.

In July 2022, Philadelphia Union president Tim McDermott said that they were in talks with the NWSL regarding possible expansion and assessing the market for NWSL for the city. Philadelphia is the fourth-largest media market in the United States.
