= Bishop Loughlin Memorial High School =

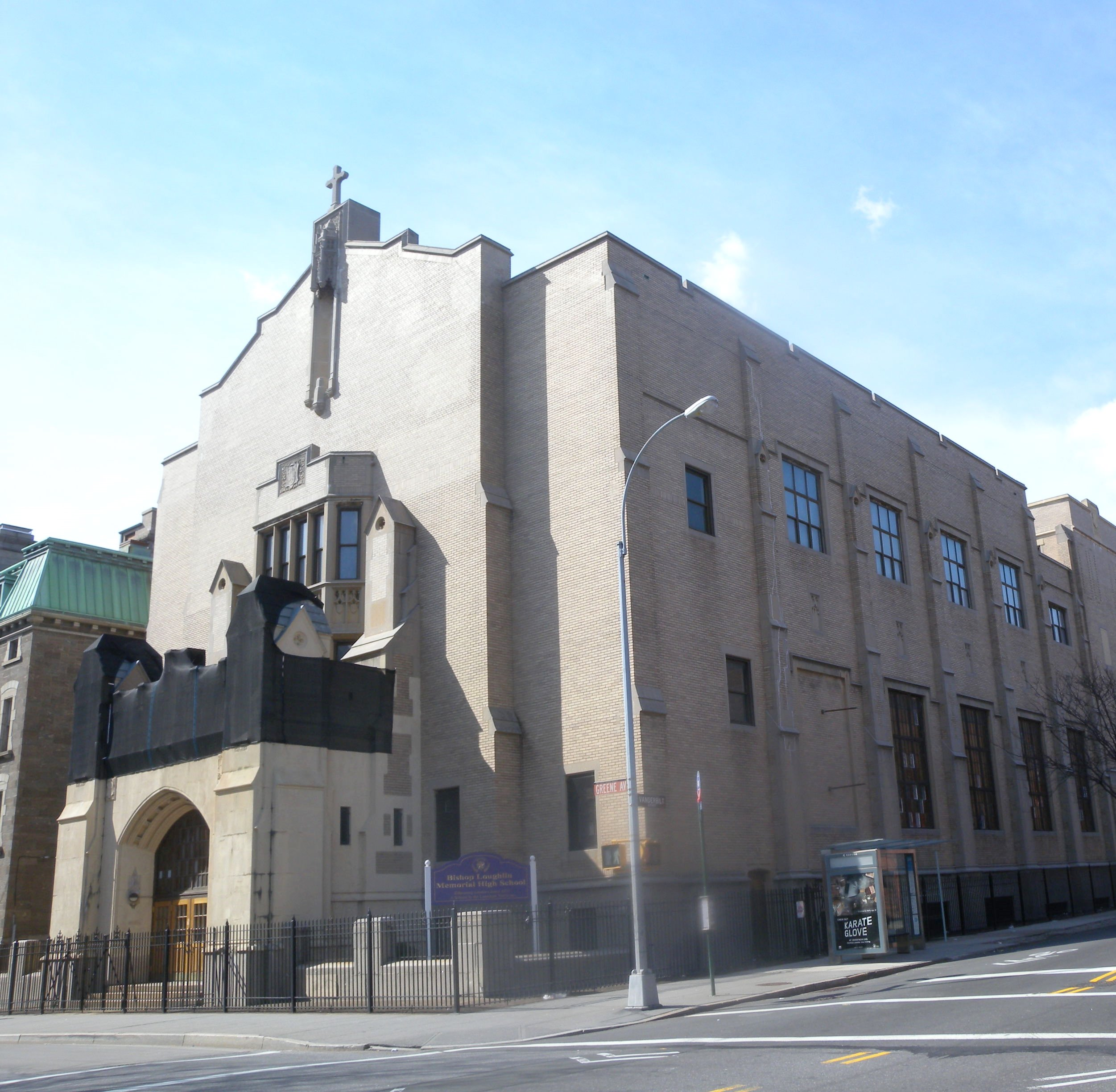
- Bishop Loughlin Memorial High School in Brooklyn in April 2011

Location
- 357 Clermont Avenue; Fort Greene, Brooklyn, New York 11238; United States; 40°41′13″N 73°58′9″W

Information
- Type: Private
- Motto: Enter to learn; leave to serve
- Religious affiliations: Roman Catholic; De La Salle Brothers
- Established: 1851; 175 years ago
- Principal: Edward Bolan
- Teaching staff: 43.6 (FTE) (2017–18)
- Grades: 9–12
- Gender: Coeducational
- Enrollment: 665 (2017–18)
- Average class size: 16–30
- Student to teacher ratio: 15.3:1 (2017–18)
- Campus: Urban
- Colors: Purple; Gold
- Slogan: Educating Leaders Since 1851
- Athletics conference: CHSAA Brooklyn-Queens Section
- Mascot: Leo the Lion
- Team name: Lions
- Rival: Christ the King Regional High School
- Accreditation: Middle States Association of Colleges and Schools
- Newspaper: Jamesonian
- Yearbook: Loughlinite
- School fees: $550 registration fee $400 graduation fee
- Tuition: $10,000 (new students) $9,865 (returning students)
- Enrollment exam: TACHS test and/or interview
- Website: www.loughlin.org
- Last updated: July 24, 2019; 7 years ago

Bishop Loughlin Memorial High School is a private, Roman Catholic, co-educational, college-preparatory high school located at 357 Clermont Avenue in the Ft. Greene neighborhood of Brooklyn, New York City. The school was founded in 1851 and was the first high school in the Diocese of Brooklyn (1853), but today is run independently by the Christian Brothers in the Lasallian educational tradition.

== History ==
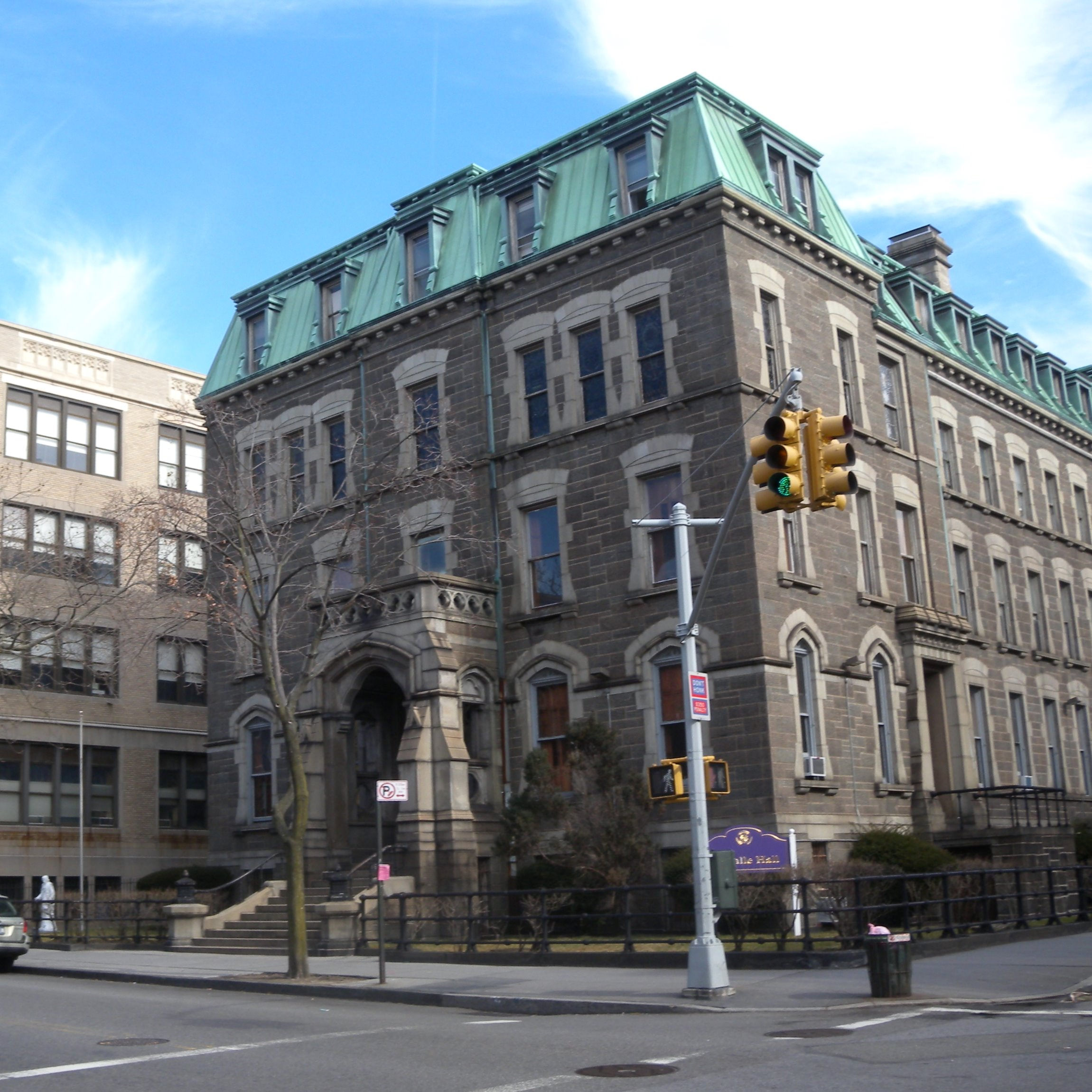
La Salle Hall at Clermont and Greene Avenues, the former residence of Bishop John Loughlin and Christian Brother faculty and staff members

In 1851, the De La Salle Christian Brothers assumed direction of the boys' section of what was then known as the St. James School on Jay Street in Brooklyn, the parochial school of St. James' Church. This was the first Catholic school in the Diocese of Brooklyn.

In 1926, St. James became one of three diocesan high schools for boys. In 1933 the school moved to Clermont Avenue, and was renamed Bishop Loughlin Memorial High after the Very Reverend John Loughlin, the first Roman Catholic Bishop of Brooklyn, who served from 1853 to 1891.

In 1933, the high school on Jay Street was closed and the Brothers and students transferred to the present campus of Bishop Loughlin Memorial High School. The new school was built on land originally intended for the diocesan cathedral bounded by Clermont, Greene, Lafayette, and Vanderbilt Avenues. The cornerstone of the school building erected in 1851 is now enshrined by the cafeteria entrance of the present building. The first Senior Prom was held in 1934 and the first edition of the Loughlinite, the school yearbook, appeared in 1938.

As a diocesan high school, Loughlin opened its doors to the people of the entire diocese, which included all of Long Island at that time. It became coeducational in 1973, following the closure of a nearby diocesan girls' high school.

== Location ==
Bishop Loughlin Memorial High School is located in the neighborhood of Fort Greene, Brooklyn, in New York City, also home to the Brooklyn Academy of Music, the Mark Morris Dance Company and several other arts and cultural organizations.

== Academics and facilities ==
La Salle Hall, originally home to staff and De La Salle brothers who taught at the school, was converted into a dormitory in 2006. The boarding program is only open to male students and was initiated to provide a stable environment for motivated boys whose performance at school has been affected by absent parents, abusive homes, homelessness or drug- and gang-dominated neighborhoods. The program is run in cooperation with the organization Boys Hope Girls Hope.

In 2016, Loughlin launched a new STEM program in partnership with Project Lead The Way (PLTW), a national nonprofit organization that partners with Brooklyn Tech, among other institutions.

== Athletics ==
Loughlin offers sports programs for both girls and boys, with 16 different sports, including rugby, soccer, and lacrosse, and a basketball team. The boys' freshman basketball team won city championships in 2017 and 2016, and the boys' varsity team won the Brooklyn/Queens Diocesan championship in 2016. Alumnus Keith Williams, class of 2017, played for the Cincinnati Bearcats in the NCAA Division 1 in 2017, and Mike Boynton, class of 2001, became the head basketball coach at Oklahoma State that year. Won the New York State Championship in Basketball in 1983, led by St John's University's all time assist leaders Mark Jackson.

Loughlin had a 4x4 track victory at the 2016 Millrose Games and a qualification for Nationals. Their track & field teams have won 21 Penn Relays high school championships.

The school also has coed teams in handball, indoor and outdoor track, cross country, and bowling. Their varsity bowling team won championships in 2014 and 2015. Loughlin also offers baseball, softball, volleyball, and cheerleading. In partnership with St. Francis College, their water polo team was the first high school team to win the Yale Invitational Tournament.

== Notable alumni ==
- Sam Belnavis, class of 1957, automobile racing executive
- Mike Boynton, class of 2000, head basketball coach at Oklahoma State University
- Khadeen Carrington (born 1995), Israeli-Trinidadian-American basketball player for Hapoel Jerusalem of the Israeli Basketball Premier League
- Tom Carroll, class of 1954, professional Major League baseball player
- Justin Champagnie (born 2001), NBA basketball player
- Julian Champagnie (born 2001), NBA basketball player
- Doug E. Doug (born 1970), actor
- Devin Ebanks (born 1989), pro basketball player currently in the Greek Basket League
- Rudy Giuliani, class of 1961, mayor of New York City, 1994–2002; U.S. Attorney for the Southern District of New York under President Reagan, 1983–89
- Ronald Holmberg, class of 1956, professional tennis player and coach
- Mark Jackson, class of 1983, professional NBA basketball player, 2011–14 head coach of Golden State Warriors
- Rev. Clinton M. Miller, leader of Brown Memorial Baptist Church in Clinton Hill
- Pete Naton, class of 1949, professional Major League baseball player
- The Notorious B.I.G. (1972–1997), rapper
- Basil Pennington, Trappist priest, leading spiritual writer
- Andre Riddick (born 1973), basketball player
- Arthur F. Ryan, class of 1959, retired CEO and chairman, Prudential Financial
- Vincent Schiavelli, actor, food writer
- Sherrod Small (born 1973), stand-up comedian
- Alvin Young, class of 1995, professional basketball player
