= Scott Fedor =

American disability advocate

Scott Wiley Fedor (born March 3, 1976) is an American motivational speaker, author, and disability advocate.

At the age of 33, he sustained a broken neck which left him paralyzed after a diving accident. His story was chronicled in the book, Head Strong: How a Broken Neck Strengthened My Spirit.

== Early life and education ==
Fedor was born and raised in Cleveland, Ohio. He attended Saint Ignatius High School and then Lehigh University in Bethlehem, Pennsylvania, where he graduated with a Bachelor of Science in finance and a minor in Mandarin Chinese. Fedor later earned a Master of Business Administration in marketing from the Ross School of Business at the University of Michigan.

== Injury and recovery ==
On July 3, 2009, Fedor sustained a complete spinal cord injury (SCI) when he broke his neck after he dove off a cottage pier into shallow water at Coldwater Lake in Michigan. He broke his C1-C6 vertebrae upon impact and severed his spinal cord at the C3 level. Fedor floated face down in the water, unable to breathe or move, and ultimately drowned before he was rescued by others.

He was transported by air ambulance to Bronson Methodist Hospital in Kalamazoo, Michigan where doctors determined that Fedor was paralyzed from the neck down. He was placed on a ventilator to allow him to breathe, since he was unable to do so on his own. Scott was told he would never walk again and would need the ventilator for the rest of his life. Because of this, Michigan Death with Dignity laws required Fedor be given the option to end his life. After a few weeks he was transferred to Cleveland's MetroHealth Medical Center, one of fourteen SCI Model Care System hospitals in the country.

Months after his injury, Fedor became the 250th person to be implanted with a diaphragmatic pacer device that allowed him to breathe without the use of a ventilator. He was eventually able to learn to breathe on his own without the diaphragmatic pacer device.

Fedor eventually became the fourteenth person in the world to be implanted with a Spinal Cough Assist System that allowed him to cough on his own and clear any secretions that might lead to pneumonia.

In 2010 Fedor worked to help change Ohio laws regarding the types of animals an individual can own and subsequently Helping Hands, a Massachusetts-based organization that trains and places helper monkeys with individuals with spinal cord injuries and limited mobility since 1979, matched Fedor with a capuchin monkey named Melanie. Melanie has her own following on Instagram. Fedor is one of the higher-injured recipients who Helping Hands has placed a service monkey with.

== Speaking and writing ==
As a result of his injury, Fedor became a motivational speaker. In 2015 he gave the keynote address at ADA Cleveland for the 25th anniversary of the Americans with Disabilities Act. Fedor has spoken at conferences and organizations across the United States. He routinely speaks to Fortune 500 corporations, colleges, high schools, and faith-based organizations. He speaks on the topics of navigating change, the power of a positive attitude, perseverance through difficult times, and faith in the face of adversity.

In October 2013, Boys Hope Girls Hope recognized Fedor with its Rising Pillar of Hope Award.

His articles have been published in various media outlets across the country, including U.S. News & World Report.

Fedor is the author of Head Strong: How a Broken Neck Strengthened My Spirit. The book was published by Coyote Crest in July 2019 on the tenth anniversary of his spinal cord injury. In July 2023, The Awakening, a science fiction novella that Fedor originally wrote in high school, was published through Coyote Crest.

== Advocacy ==
In 2011, Fedor founded Getting Back Up, a nonprofit organization that provides individuals with spinal cord injuries funding for exercise-based recovery programs and adaptable products. He is an advocate member of The Adversity 2 Advocacy Alliance, a nonprofit organization dedicated to promoting and fostering the power of turning personal adversity into service to others with similar challenges. Fedor serves on the board of directors for Linking Employment, Abilities and Potential (LEAP), a nonprofit organization whose mission is to advance participation and equality in society for people with disabilities.

== Professional career ==
At the time of his injury, Fedor was a vice president for Halex, a Scott Fetzer Company and Berkshire Hathaway subsidiary. Prior to Halex, Fedor worked at Trex, Newell Rubbermaid, and Aptiv (formally Delphi Automotive).

== Personal life ==
Scott Fedor married Kristy Costell on June 9, 2007. After his injury the couple had their marriage dissolved.
