= Michael Murphy (sports executive) =

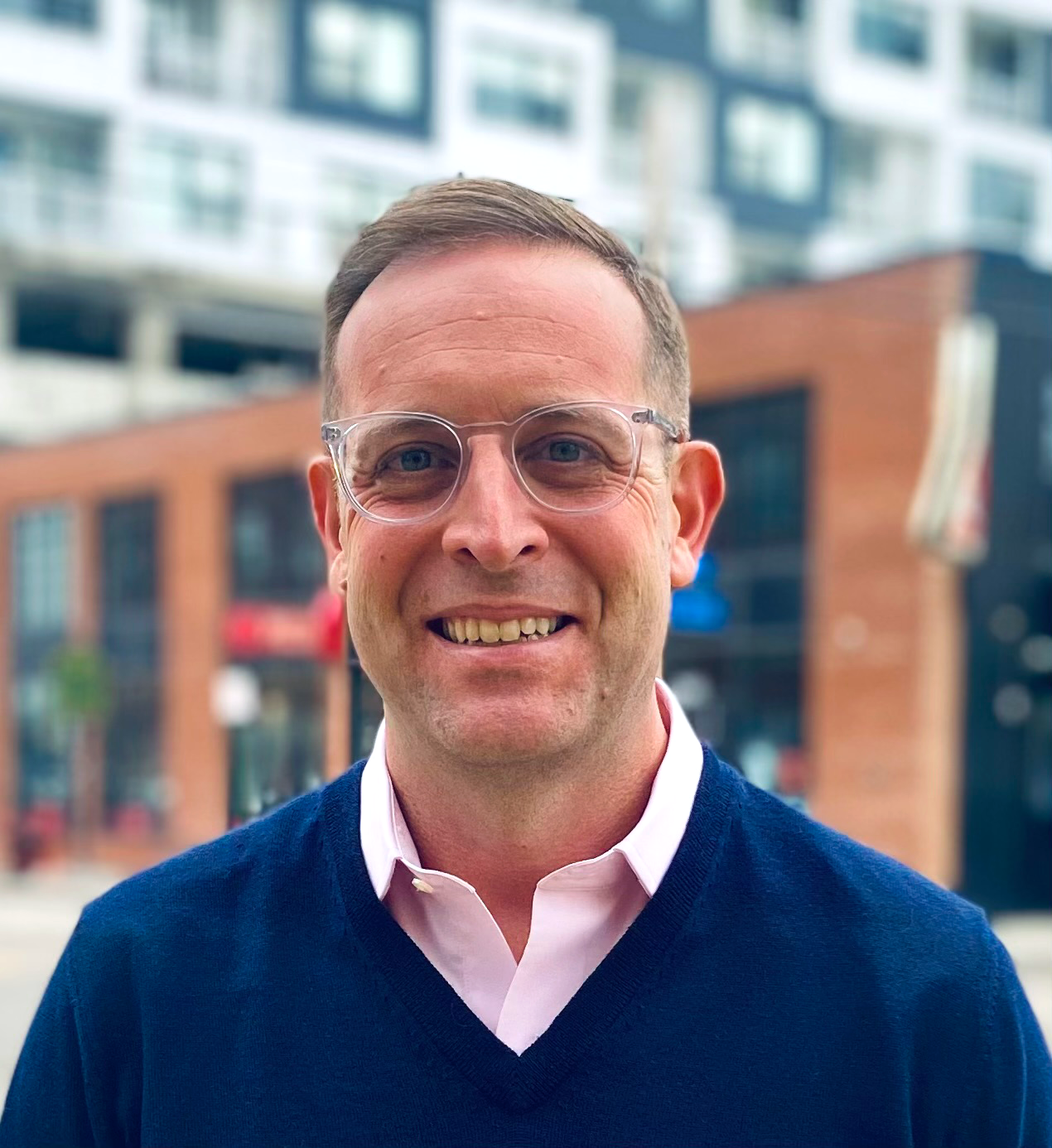
- Murphy in 2024
- Born: 1977 (age 48–49); University Heights, Ohio
- Education: College of the Holy Cross (BA); University of Akron (JD)
- Title: CEO & Co-Founder of Cleveland Soccer Group
- Website: https://www.clevelandprosoccer.com/

Michael Murphy is an American sports executive. He is the CEO and co-founder of Cleveland Pro Soccer, the ownership group of Cleveland's MLS NEXT Pro soccer team and prospective NWSL team.

== Early life and education ==
Murphy was born and raised inUniversity Heights, Ohio. He graduated from St. Ignatius High School, a Jesuit high school in Cleveland, in 1996. He then graduated from the College of the Holy Cross in Worcester, Massachusetts, with a Bachelor of Arts in 2000 and earned a Juris Doctor (J.D.) from the University of Akron School of Law in 2003.

== Military service ==
Murphy was commissioned as an Army Officer in 2000. He was a Captain in the U.S. Army, where he served on active duty as a Judge Advocate from 2004-2008. In 2005, Murphy deployed as a member of the Aviation Brigade, 3rd Infantry Division in support of Operation Iraqi Freedom, where he was awarded the Bronze Star Medal.

== Career ==
=== Gravitas Ventures ===
Murphy joined Gravitas Ventures in 2007 as SVP of Business Affairs, and became President in 2009. In 2019, Gravitas Ventures moved its headquarters to Cleveland to "cement the city's impact on the entertainment industry."

Murphy remained President of Gravitas Ventures throughout the company's sales in 2017 and 2021.

=== Cleveland Pro Soccer ===
Murphy left Gravitas Ventures in 2022 to co-found the sports ownership group Cleveland Pro Soccer with Nolan Gallagher. He currently serves as CEO.

In an interview with Front Office Sports, Murphy and Gallagher explained that the idea of bringing professional outdoor soccer to Cleveland came up in 2021 when they recognized that Cleveland was the only top-20 market without professional outdoor soccer teams.

==== MLS NEXT Pro ====
On November 21, 2022, Cleveland Pro Soccer announced its new independent club would join the MLS NEXT Pro soccer league in 2025. In Feb. 2024, Murphy told Cleveland Scene "there's a good chance the team's debut is delayed from 2025 until a stadium is built, which could take up to two years from when ground is broken." The team's name, colors and crest will be also revealed at a later date.

==== National Women's Soccer League ====
In October 2023, Cleveland Pro Soccer announced the group was preparing to present a bid for the 16th NWSL expansion team. The team would be the first and only professional women's soccer team in the state of Ohio. As of April 2024, 12,000 fans had made ticket pledges to support the bid for an NWSL team in Cleveland. As of November 2024, 15,000 season ticket pledges have been made.

In an interview with Cleveland Magazine, Murphy said, "Fandom is just going to increase significantly with the World Cup [...] So that Cleveland and Northeast Ohio really has a seat at the table as the whole world and the whole country is talking about this, that we are in the game, so to speak, and not on the sidelines anymore. We think the economic impact will be significant".

==== New stadium efforts ====
In an interview with Front Office Sports, Murphy said a stadium plan would be important for attracting an NWSL team to the city. In February 2024, the Ohio House of Representatives earmarked funding for "Cleveland Women's Soccer Stadium." Murphy has stated that the stadium will seat between 12,500 to 13,000 fans, and the project will cost an estimated $150 million.

In May 2024, Cleveland Soccer Group released renderings of the stadium. In September 2024, Cleveland Soccer Group released updated renderings for the soccer-specific stadium and announced a partnership with Cleveland Metroparks with which CSG acquired land for the prospective stadium site.

== Personal life ==
Murphy grew up and lives on the east side of Cleveland. He coaches track, basketball and soccer at St. Dominic’s School. A major supporter of Cleveland State University men’s and women’s basketball, Murphy believes sports have the power to transform the identity of the institution and the city.

=== Community involvement ===
Murphy is a member of the Cleveland Chapter of Young Presidents' Organization (YPO), a member of the U.S. Soccer Development Council, on the board of Boys Hope Girls Hope of Northeast Ohio and on the advisory council for Play Gap (formerly Northeast Ohio Women's Sports Alliance).
