= Nolan Gallagher =

American sports executive

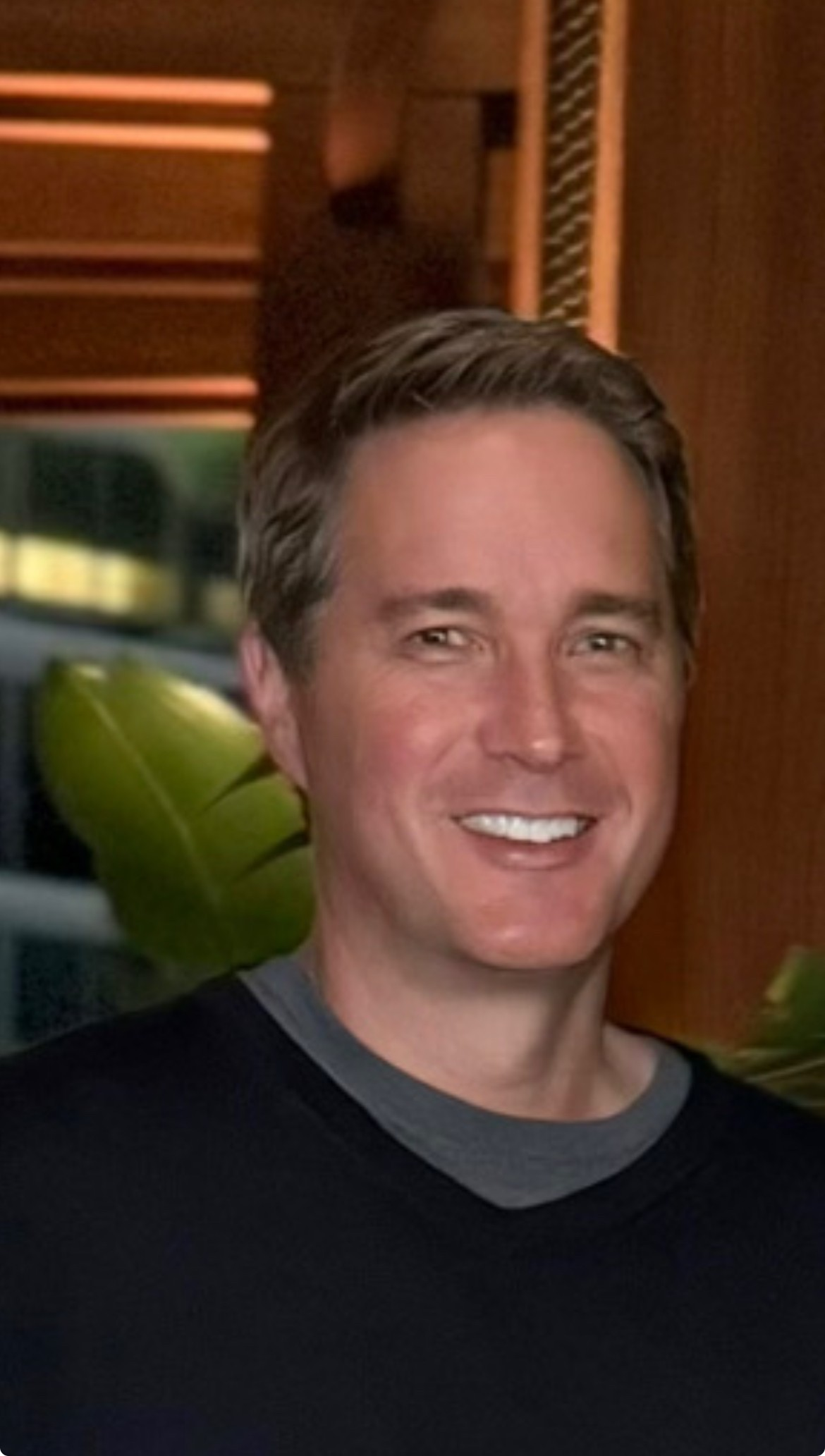
- Nolan Gallagher in 2024
- Born: Cleveland, Ohio
- Education: B.S. Boston College, M.B.A. USC Marshall School of Business
- Organization: Cleveland Soccer Group | Cleveland Pro Soccer
- Title: Co-Founder
- Website: https://www.clevelandprosoccer.com/

Nolan Gallagher is an American sports executive. He is president and co-founder of Cleveland Pro Soccer, the ownership group of Cleveland's MLS NEXT Pro soccer team and prospective NWSL team.

== Career ==
=== Gravitas Ventures ===
Nolan Gallagher founded Gravitas Ventures, an independent film global distribution company, in Los Angeles in 2006. Gallagher remained CEO of Gravitas Ventures throughout the company's acquisitions in 2017 and 2021. He stepped down as CEO in March 2023 to co-found and launch Cleveland Pro Soccer with Michael Murphy.

=== Cleveland Professional Soccer ===
Gallagher and Michael Murphy co-founded Cleveland Professional Soccer in 2022. In an interview with Front Office Sports, Gallagher said the idea of bringing professional outdoor soccer to Cleveland came up in 2021, when he and co-founder Murphy recognized that Cleveland was the only top-20 market without professional outdoor soccer teams.

In 2022, the group announced an MLS NEXT Pro team would be coming to Cleveland, and they also announced their intention to bring a National Women's Soccer League team to the city.

== Awards & Recognition ==
Gallagher was named one of Variety's Hollywood New Leaders in 2011. Throughout his career in entertainment, he spoke on a number of industry panels, including at the Toronto International Film Festival and SXSW Film Festival. USC Marshall School of Business Lloyd Greif Center of Entrepreneurial Studies named Gallagher its 2020 Alumni Entrepreneur of the Year.

== Community Involvement ==
Nolan is a Board Member for the Greater Cleveland Sports Commission, a member of the Leadership Cleveland Class of 2024, a member of the Cleveland Chapter of Young Presidents’ Organization (YPO) and on the Cleveland Clinic Children’s Leadership Council.
