= There Is a Monster =

- Official release poster
- Directed by: Mike Taylor
- Screenplay by: Mike Taylor
- Produced by: Mike Taylor
- Starring: Joey Collins; Ena O'Rourke
- Edited by: Millie de Medici
- Music by: JP Wogaman II
- Distributed by: Gravitas Ventures
- Release date: January 30, 2024 (VOD)
- Running time: 82 minutes
- Country: United States
- Language: English

There Is a Monster is a 2024 American horror film directed by Mike Taylor and starring Joey Collins, Ena O'Rourke, Jesse Milliner, MerryRose Howley. The film debuted on January 30, 2024, on VOD.

== Plot ==
Jack is a successful photographer. One day he thinks he sees something in the shadows of his studio, but blames it on the tequila he had the night before. Another day, while getting ready for bed, he's shocked to see something outside his bedroom window. The "monster". A frantic search outside with his wife Carol turns up nothing. But later the monster hovers over him as he sleeps, and the next day his speech isn't quite right. More attacks occur and he blames the monster for his troubles. He's the only one who sees the monster, no one else. He goes to see his doctor, but the doctor can't figure out what's going on with him and thinks maybe he's hallucinating. His wife and best friend wonder if maybe he's losing his mind. But the damage being done to his body by the monster is very real.

== Cast ==
- Joey Collins as Jack
- Ena O'Rourke as Carol
- Jesse Milliner as Billy
- MerryRose Howley as Suzy
- Kelly Schwartz as Tricia
- Marcellus Shepard as David
- Tim Nicholson as the Psychiatrist
- Laurent Amzallag as the Monster
- Steve Teller as the Creative Director

== Reception ==
Terry Sherwood of "FilmThreat" stated, "True psychological horror is very tough to make a reality for an audience. Material such as the Robert Wise directed The Haunting, The Innocents with Deborah Kerr, and today's films like The Babadook get lost in the maelstrom of jump scares and gore. One of the greatest powers many Monsters hold is the power of disbelief or denial that they exist until it is too late. Taking the psychological impact of a subtle belief that is devastating, adding a dose of denial, and turning it slightly on its head, you have Mike Taylor Written and directed There is a Monster." MontiLee Stormer of Movie Reelist stated, "There Is a Monster is as simple a film as you can get. There is no flashy CGI and the effects are basic and practical. This isn't a bad thing, as it allows the story and characters to be the focus. 'There is a Monster' could have gone in a number of outrageous directions, but it would have taken away from the low current pull of betrayal of one's own body and cheapened the singular horror of being locked in. It's an effective film with solid direction, showing that horror and terror are the things that drive your fear, no matter what it is." Nathaniel Muir of AIPT Comics commented, "Ultimately, There Is a Monster tries to do more than is necessary. A revelation at the end tries to make sense of everything, but it feels too contrived. As a whole, the movie is never actively bad, but it ends up taking itself too seriously. This makes sense considering its inspiration, but it also takes away from what is otherwise a run of the mill thriller."
