= Arthur F. Ryan =

American business executive

- Born: April 23, 1943
- Died: July 27, 2026 (aged 83)

Arthur F. Ryan (1942-2026) was an American businessman who became CEO of Prudential Insurance in 1994, the first CEO selected from outside the firm. He was inducted into the New Jersey Hall of Fame in 2018.

== Early years ==
Arthur Ryan was born in Brooklyn, New York and was raised on Long Island. He attended Bishop Loughlin Memorial High School. He went on to attend Providence College in 1963, where he received his BA in Mathematics. Ryan served in the Army for two years after college.

== Early career ==
Ryan worked for Control Data Corporation from 1965-1972 and then Chase Manhattan Bank from 1972-1994. In 1984, he was named an Executive Vice President at Chase and in 1990, he became President and CEO.

== Prudential Insurance ==
In 1994, Ryan became CEO of Prudential Insurance. After he took charge of Prudential, Ryan asked New Jersey to launch a full investigation of the company resulting in $35 million in fines and $410 million to $1 billion for victimized policy holders.

While at Prudential Ryan was a champion of the city of Newark and was instrumental in many projects downtown, particularly the New Jersey Performing Arts Center and Prudential Center arena. He was a strong supporter of Essex County's projects in Branch Brook Park and Turtle Back Zoo.

Ryan retired from Prudential in 2008.

== Philanthropy & other roles ==
Arthur Ryan has provided funds to Providence College's School of Business and in 2015 a building was named "The Arthur and Patricia Ryan Center for Business Studies".

Ryan was on the board of Providence College, Regeneron Pharmaceuticals, and the New York–Presbyterian Hospital, and co-chair of the board of the New Jersey Performing Arts Center and Achieve Inc..

== Personal life ==
Ryan was married to his wife Patricia, who died in 2018, and had four children.
