= Forest City Cleveland =

Men's soccer club based in Cleveland, Ohio

- Founded: November 21, 2022; 3 years ago
- Owner: Cleveland Soccer Group
- League: MLS Next Pro
- Website: forestcitycle.com

Forest City Cleveland is a professional men's soccer club based in Cleveland, Ohio. It is owned by Cleveland Soccer Group, which was founded by Michael Murphy. The team plans to commence play in MLS Next Pro, in the third tier of the United States league system, in the 2027 season. Cleveland Soccer Group also owns Cleveland Astra, a women's team that plans to commence play in WPSL Pro, a second-tier league.

== History ==
Gallagher and Murphy, who met as classmates at Cleveland's St. Ignatius High School, founded Gravitas Ventures in 2006 in Los Angeles. Under their leadership, Gravitas became a global-rights theatrical film distribution company, releasing more than 3,000 video-on-demand (VOD) films and winning awards and notice from industry organizations like the Film Independent Spirit Awards, the Academy of Motion Pictures Arts & Sciences and numerous film festivals. In 2019 they moved the firm to Cleveland to “…further economic momentum for media and entertainment in their hometown.” In 2021, they sold Gravitas to Anthem Sports & Entertainment Co., a multi-platform media conglomerate from Toronto, for $73 million.

In 2022, they co-founded Cleveland Professional Soccer with Murphy as CEO, and Gallagher president of the sports team ownership group.

On March 31, 2023, Gallagher stepped down as Gravitas CEO to focus on the soccer team.

In an interview with Front Office Sports, Gallagher said the idea of bringing professional outdoor soccer to Cleveland came up in 2021, when he and Murphy recognized that Cleveland was the only top-20 market without professional outdoor soccer teams.

=== MLS Next Pro Team ===
On November 21, 2022, MLS Next Pro announced that a new independent club, Cleveland Pro Soccer, in Cleveland would join the league as early as 2025. In April 2024, Cleveland Scene's Vince Grzegorek reported that the MLS Next Pro team's debut would likely be delayed (from 2025) as the ownership group finalized plans for a soccer-specific stadium in Cleveland.

On March 10, 2026, MLS Next Pro announced that Cleveland's club would be called Forest City Cleveland, joining the league in the 2027 season.

=== NWSL expansion bid ===
Cleveland Pro Soccer presented a bid for the 15th NWSL expansion team. Cleveland was among four finalist teams, including Boston, San Francisco and Tampa. The expansion team was eventually granted to NWSL Boston in December 2022.

NWSL commissioner Jessica Berman announced in November 2023 that the league would add a 16th team by 2026.

In October 2023, Cleveland Pro Soccer announced the group was preparing to present a bid for the 16th NWSL expansion team. The team would be the first and only professional women's soccer team in the state of Ohio. Cleveland's potential as a home for both a MLS (Next) and NWSL team is enhanced by its unique sports profile. Like two of the other NWSL cities (Louisville, Kentucky and Cary, North Carolina), Cleveland does not have an MLS team; the closest team is the Columbus Crew, two hours away. Additionally Cleveland has the smallest population of any city with an MLB (Guardians), NFL (Browns) and NBA (Cavaliers) franchise. The success of the record-setting 2024 NCAA Women's Final Four in Cleveland demonstrated the growing popularity of women's sports. Gallagher and Murphy report that – with no team, no logo, no name and no stadium – they already had 13,000 pledges to purchase season tickets, demonstrating potential support for a team.

== Stadium ==
In an interview with Front Office Sports, co-founders Gallagher and Murphy said a stadium plan would be important for attracting an NWSL team to the city. In February 2024, the Ohio House of Representatives earmarked funding for "Cleveland Women's Soccer Stadium".

Gallagher and Murphy are seeking $90 million in government investment from city, county and state sources via admission tax and public revenue bonds, to build a new stadium, seating 13,000, in downtown Cleveland. They propose investing $193 million on their own for the stadium, practice facilities and on both the NWSL and MLS Next teams. The stadium would also host high school and college events as well as act as a concert venue on as many as 60 occasions per year. The structure will be the first public/private stadium in the US that focuses on women's sports, according to Murphy.

== Club crest and colors ==
The club's crest is a hexagonal shape inspired by the Art Deco geometry of Cleveland's historic architecture and depicts a tree with twelve leaves to represent the eleven players on the pitch and the Cleveland community. The roots of the tree form the shape of the Lake Erie shoreline of northern Ohio. The team's colors are referred to as Forest City Green, Lake Erie Midnight, and Golden Era.

== See also ==
- MLS Next Pro
- NWSL
- Cleveland Crunch
- Cleveland Force
- Cleveland Stokers
- Cleveland SC
- Cleveland City Stars
- Cleveland Stars/Cobras
- AFC Cleveland
