= Camping Trip (film) =

- Promotional poster
- Directed by: Leonardo Fuica; Demian Fuica
- Written by: Leonardo Fuica
- Starring: Leonardo Fuica; Caitlin Cameron; Alex Gravenstein; Hannah Forest Briand
- Release date: August 16, 2022
- Running time: 115 minutes
- Country: Canada
- Language: English

Camping Trip is a 2022 Canadian crime thriller drama film written by Leonardo Fuica, directed by Leonardo Fuica and Demian Fuica and starring Leonardo Fuica, Caitlin Cameron, Alex Gravenstein and Hannah Forest Briand.

== Cast ==
- Leonardo Fuica as Enzo
- Caitlin Cameron as Polly
- Alex Gravenstein as Ace
- Hannah Forest Briand as Coco

== Release ==
The film was released digitally on August 16, 2022.

== Reception ==
The film has a 20% rating on Rotten Tomatoes based on 10 reviews. Abhishek Sharma of Film Threat scored the film a 4 out of 10. Phil Hoad of The Guardian awarded the film two stars out of five.
