= Gravitas Ventures =

Film distribution company

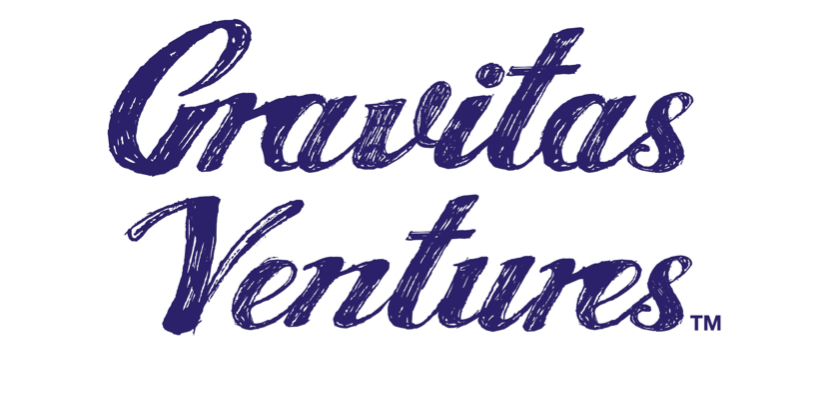
- Type: Subsidiary
- Industry: Media and entertainment
- Founded: 2006; 20 years ago, in Los Angeles, California, U.S.
- Founder: Nolan Gallagher
- Headquarters: Cleveland, Ohio, U.S.
- Area served: Worldwide
- Key people: Bill Guentzler (Senior Vice President, Acquisitions & Operations); Jason Woods (Vice President, Finance); Sophia Fields (Vice President, Operations); Danielle Gasher (Vice President, Acquisitions & International Sales); Kellie Mutch (Vice President, Partner Management)
- Parent: Shout! Studios
- Website: gravitasventures.com

Gravitas Ventures is an American film distribution company owned by Shout! Studios. The company was founded by Nolan Gallagher in Los Angeles in 2006, and moved its headquarters from Los Angeles to Cleveland in 2019. It focuses on the distribution of independent feature films and documentaries.

Home media releases of its films are handled as a distribution partner by Studio Distribution Services, a joint-venture between Universal Pictures and Warner Bros. Home Entertainment.

== History ==
Gravitas Ventures was founded in Los Angeles, California, by Nolan Gallagher in 2006. Michael Murphy joined as President and a fellow owner in 2007. The company has offered films to theaters through VOD, and streaming services, such as its own "Gravitas Movies" platform. Gravitas has been recognized as one of the biggest content providers to independent VOD services. The Los Angeles Business Journal recognized the company as the #3 fastest-growing private company in 2012, where it was #4 fastest-growing in 2011. In 2019 the company moved its headquarters to Cleveland, Ohio. In 2021, Gravitas-distributed film The Mole Agent was nominated for an Academy Award for Best Documentary.

In 2017, the content division of the German broadcast company ProSiebenSat.1, Red Arrow Entertainment, purchased a majority position in Gravitas, with an agreement to move to complete ownership in the future. Gravitas remains independent, but works in cooperation with Red Arrow International, the company's distribution group. Red Arrow management said the combination of content generation, distribution and capacity to finance and own projects was motivation for the purchase. They planned to make “significant investments” in global film and television projects.

In 2020, Murphy was recognized as a Hero in Home Entertainment by Media Play News.

On November 16, 2021, Gravitas was acquired by Canadian media company Anthem Sports & Entertainment for $73 million in a cash and stock deal. In April 2025, Anthem sold the company to Shout! Studios, with Gravitas and Shout! continuing to operate as separate brands.

== Select filmography ==
Gravitas mostly distributes movies through digital channels, though some films get released in theatrical venues nationwide. The COVID-19 pandemic, and subsequent lockdowns measures which resulted in closing of theaters that spring. This would delay the release of several films; such as The Secret: Dare to Dream, which would eventually be released to streaming and VOD platforms in July 2020.

Other streaming releases have included Our Friend (2019) and Queen Bees (2021).

On January 21, 2022, the company released The King's Daughter exclusively to over 1,000 theaters.

=== 2010s ===
Release date	Film title	Notes
March 23, 2012	October Baby	
February 18, 2014	Don't Pass Me By	
March 21, 2014	Stay	
July 18, 2014	Among Ravens	
August 1, 2014	Shock Value	
September 5, 2014	The Longest Week	
February 6, 2015	Lovesick	
February 13, 2015	Da Sweet Blood of Jesus	
May 29, 2015	I Believe in Unicorns	
July 1, 2016	Buddymoon	
August 26, 2016	Ace the Case	
September 23, 2016	Total Frat Movie	
December 9, 2016	Slash	
June 2, 2017	All About the Money	
June 16, 2017	Score: A Film Music Documentary	
July 14, 2017	Battle Scars	
September 15, 2017	Easy Living	
November 3, 2017	Bad Match	
November 17, 2017	Almost Friends	
December 12, 2017	Thrill Ride	
January 12, 2018	Abe & Phil's Last Poker Game	
April 2018	Desolation	
June 1, 2018	All Summers End	
June 5, 2018	Apostasy	
July 20, 2018	Broken Star	
July 27, 2018	Snapshots	
August 10, 2018	Along Came the Devil	
August 31, 2018	An Actor Prepares	
September 28, 2018	At First Light	
October 5, 2018	Bayou Caviar	
October 25, 2018	The Bill Murray Stories: Life Lessons Learned from a Mythical Man	
November 9, 2018	Lez Bomb	
January 4, 2019	Being Rose	
January 11, 2019	Against the Clock	
May 24, 2019	Assimilate	
August 2, 2019	Airplane Mode	
August 16, 2019	Already Gone	
September 14, 2019	5 Years Apart	
November 15, 2019	Line of Descent	
December 6, 2019	The Mandela Effect	
December 20, 2019	Santa Fake	

=== 2020s ===
Release date	Film title	Notes
January 31, 2020	Coda	
March 6, 2020	Becoming	
March 10, 2020	I Hate the Man in My Basement	
March 13, 2020	Lost Transmissions	
April 17, 2020	Bad Therapy	
April 24, 2020	Braking for Whales	
May 26, 2020	I Will Make You Mine	
May 29, 2020	End of Sentence	
June 30, 2020	Skyman	
July 17, 2020	Easy Does It	
July 31, 2020	The Secret: Dare to Dream	
August 11, 2020	The Dark End of the Street	
August 28, 2020	Sadak 2	
September 25, 2020	All Roads to Pearla	
September 25, 2020	Foster Boy	
October 9, 2020	Faith Based	
October 13, 2020	Criminal Audition	
October 30, 2020	Blackjack: The Jackie Ryan Story	
November 27, 2020	Princess of the Row	
December 4, 2020	Elyse	
December 15, 2020	Paint	
December 18, 2020	Bad Impulse	
January 8, 2021	Grizzly II: Revenge	
February 19, 2021	The Violent Heart	
March 12, 2021	Insight	
March 23, 2021	One and the Same	
March 26, 2021	Spiked	
May 28, 2021	Welcome Matt	
June 4, 2021	Chasing Wonders	
July 30, 2021	Fully Realized Humans	
August 13, 2021	Charming the Hearts of Men	
September 21, 2021	The Killing of Kenneth Chamberlain	
September 24, 2021	Lone Wolf	
November 24, 2021	The Shuroo Process	
November 26, 2021	An Intrusion	
December 17, 2021	Last Words	
January 21, 2022	The King's Daughter	
February 1, 2022	Home	
March 22, 2022	The Institute	
July 1, 2022	Most Guys Are Losers	
August 12, 2022	Mack & Rita	
August 16, 2022	Camping Trip	
October 21, 2022	Where Are You	
December 2, 2022	What Remains	
February 17, 2023	The Integrity of Joseph Chambers	
February 24, 2023	Who Are You People	
March 7, 2023	ReBroken	
June 2, 2023	Padre Pio	
June 9, 2023	Heroes of the Golden Masks	
August 29, 2023	Welcome to Redville	
August 30, 2023	Slotherhouse	
December 5, 2023	Fireline	
January 2, 2024	The Mummy Murders	
January 4, 2024	DarkGame	
January 30, 2024	There Is a Monster	
March 19, 2024	Bardejov	
March 26, 2024	Handle With Care: The Legend of the Notic Streetball Crew	
March 26, 2024	Snow Valley	
June 14, 2024	Bad Behaviour	
June 18, 2024	The Present	
July 9, 2024	Exposure	
August 5, 2024	Trust in Love	
August 6, 2024	The Mouse Trap	
September 24, 2024	Paradox Effect	
October 22, 2024	To Fall in Love	
December 17, 2024	Glue Trap	
January 28, 2025	Regarding Us	
February 26, 2025	Adult Best Friends	
March 14, 2025	Endless Calls for Fame	
March 28, 2025	Layla	
April 25, 2025	Die Like A Man	
May 13, 2025	The Lost Princess	
