= Boys Hope Girls Hope =

US-based non-profit organization

- Founded: 1977
- Founder: Paul Sheridan, SJ
- Type: Charitable
- Purpose: Youth development; college access and success
- Location: St. Louis, Missouri, U.S.
- Website: boyshopegirlshope.org

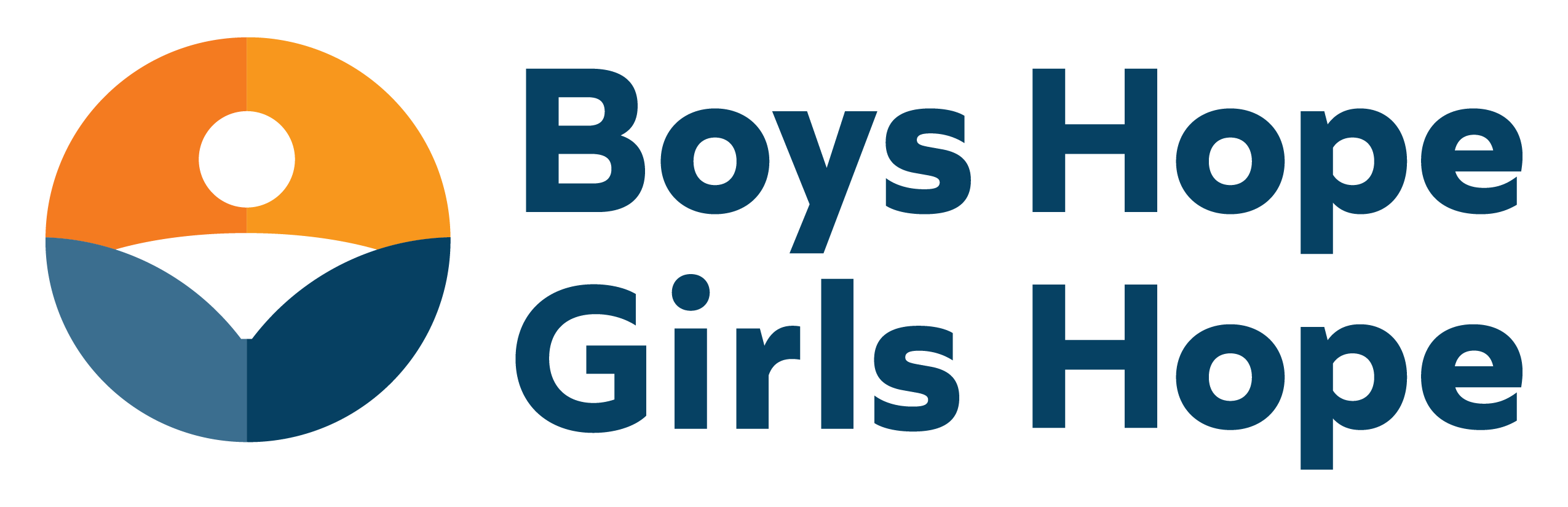
Boys Hope Girls Hope logo introduced in 2019

Boys Hope Girls Hope is an international charitable organization founded in 1977. Its mission is "to nurture and guide motivated young people in need to become well-educated, career-ready men and women for others." The program is long-term, ranging from middle school through high school, to college graduation and career launch. Participation in the program is voluntary. Young people are identified for application through referrals, and are selected to participate based on need and motivation. Participants are referred to as “scholars” and are enrolled in strong schools, often private, and provided academic, social-emotional, spiritual, and life skills and support. In addition, scholars participate in regular community service projects to promote becoming "persons for others," which is a Jesuit-inspired value of developing character through service-learning related to social justice and civic responsibility.

The Boys Hope Girls Hope program offers its scholars two pathways, residential or academy, and continues to provide guidance and financial support to those in college. Each Boys Hope Girls Hope residential group home serves six to twelve young people and partners with families. Academy programs are currently available in around half of the affiliates. The New York and Guatemala affiliates have expanded residential boarding operations. Network-wide, Boys Hope Girls Hope serves approximately 1,200 young people through its residential and academy pathways and in college. The organization also leads an alumni community of its graduates who serve as speakers, advocates, volunteer mentors and board members. Boys Hope Girls Hope affiliates operate in 14 cities across the United States, in Guatemala and Mexico. Boys Hope Girls Hope's Network Headquarters is located in St. Louis, Missouri.
